= Muggable Mary, Street Cop =

1982 film by Sandor Stern

- Genre: Drama
- Based on: Muggable Mary by Mary Glatzle with Evelyn Fiore
- Teleplay by: Sandor Stern
- Directed by: Sandor Stern
- Starring: Karen Valentine
- Music by: Earle Hagen
- Country of origin: United States
- Original language: English

Production
- Executive producer: Bernard Oseransky
- Producer: Neil T. Maffeo
- Cinematography: Ron Lautore
- Editor: Ina Massari
- Running time: 95 minutes
- Production company: CBS Entertainment Production

Original release
- Network: CBS
- Release: February 25, 1982

Muggable Mary, Street Cop (also styled as Muggable Mary: Street Cop) is a 1982 American drama television film written and directed by Sandor Stern. It is inspired by the 1980 book Muggable Mary by Mary Glatzle with Evelyn Fiore, which details Glatzle's real-life experiences as a detective in the New York City Police Department's Street Crimes Unit, where she served as an undercover decoy in over five hundred operations during the peak of New York City's mugging epidemic. It stars Karen Valentine as Glatzle, Michael Pearlman as her son Eric, John Getz as her colleague and love interest Dan Waters, and Vincent Gardenia as her supervisor Maggio.

The film premiered on CBS on February 25, 1982, as a CBS Special Movie Presentation. Valentine earned widespread critical acclaim for her performance, which marked her first time playing a real-life person and a police officer, as well as her transition to more serious dramatic roles.

== Plot ==
Mary Glatzle is an unemployed single mother who lives in New York City with her eight-year-old son Eric, who was born with hydrocephalus and is partially blind in one eye. Her father wanted her to place him in an institution, but she refused and still resents him. About a year after Eric was born, she and her husband divorced; he now lives in Denver with his new family.

Eric is a bright and active boy, but he has had several surgeries and must have more. So when Mary is invited to become a police officer in response to an application she submitted to the New York City Police Department (NYPD) five years ago, she accepts to take advantage of the good medical benefits. Eric, however, opposes her decision because he fears she will be killed.

Mary survives the rigors of her police academy training, including those imposed by her relentless judo instructor, Frank Reineke. She pushes through with the emotional support of fellow cadet Donna Metzger. Donna encourages her to go out with another cadet, Dan Waters, who flirtatiously calls her "Peanut" because of her small stature.

Mary is assigned to a precinct house in Manhattan as a matron supervising arrestees. On her first day she helps her new colleague, Kathy Thomas, restrain a violent prisoner. The stresses of her job are compounded by her tense relationship with her father and her fear that Eric hates her, as she confesses to her friend. Kathy convinces Mary to accept a special assignment posing as a prostitute. Realizing that she has a talent for decoy work, she joins the Street Crimes Unit and becomes a mugging decoy. On their first operation together, Mary, Dan, and Joe track a rapist. The incident frightens, but also excites, her.

Meanwhile, Eric, who has been playing baseball without Mary's permission, is injured in the face during a game and is sent to the hospital. Mary tells him he could have permanently damaged his eye and demands that he promise not to play baseball again. Their conflict intensifies, and Eric decides to accept his father's invitation to spend the summer in Denver.

Three months later, after several successful operations, Dan and Joe give Mary the name "Muggable Mary" in a celebration at a bar. Dan spontaneously kisses Mary, who slaps him and storms out. After a brief argument, they spend the night together and begin dating.

Subsequently, Joe is killed by a woman who has just murdered her father. Mary confronts the woman, only to freeze when a gun is pointed at her. Dan fatally shoots the woman to save Mary's life. A distraught Mary tells her supervisor Maggio that she cannot go out on the street again.

Eric returns from Denver, where he spent a happy summer with his father and learned to ride a horse. He tells Mary that his father is adding him to his medical plan, so she can quit her job. She subsequently learns that a psychopathic killer/rapist in Central Park has slashed Donna to death. Maggio pleads with her to help catch him, but she insists on quitting.

Mary and Eric go horseback riding in the park. During a break, she glances at the front page of a newspaper and sees that the killer has struck again. While she is preoccupied, Eric rides away on his horse. She panics, but he circles back safely. She tells him, "You trained to ride a horse; I trained to be a cop."

Mary informs Maggio that she agrees to be a decoy to catch the killer and asks for Dan, whom she is no longer dating, as a backup; her other partner is Vince. On the night of the operation, Mary knocks on Eric's bedroom to tell him she is leaving; he coldly says goodbye to her through the closed door. However, as she is about to drive away, he runs to her car, asks if he can wait up for her, and says he hopes she catches the killer. In the park, Dan gives Mary a protective leather band to wear around her neck; however, the radios the team relies on are not working properly. As she passes under the 81st Street bridge walking a dog, the killer suddenly jumps down from the structure, grabs her from behind, and puts a knife to her throat. She fends him off and then fatally shoots him. Dan and Vince run to her aid, and she tells a visibly upset Dan that her training from Frank and his leather band saved her life.

Dan drives Mary home. She invites him to come by next Sunday to meet Eric, implying that she is considering rekindling their romance. When she enters her home, the babysitter sees her arm in a sling and asks her what happened. She replies, "I fell off my horse," and Eric runs to embraces her.

== Cast ==
=== Main cast ===
- Karen Valentine as Mary Glatzle
- John Getz as Dan Waters
- Anne DeSalvo as Mary's friend
- Robert Christian as Joe Bell
- Michael Pearlman as Eric Glatzle
- Vincent Gardenia (as Vince Gardenia) as Maggio

=== Other cast ===
- Beej Johnson as Donna Metzger
- Alan North as Mary's father
- Anna Maria Horsford as Kathy Thomas
- Dan Lauria as Vince Palucci
- John Corcoran as Frank Reineke

== Production ==
Muggable Mary: Street Cop is based on the book Muggable Mary by Mary Glatzle with Evelyn Fiore, in which she recounted her real-life experiences a plainclothes mugging decoy in the NYPD. Born in 1942, Glatzle worked as a bookkeeper for several years before becoming an NYPD officer in 1969. She initially supervised arrestees as a matron at a Manhattan precinct house. Then she joined the department's Street Crime Unit (SCU), which formed in 1971 to combat the city's epidemic of muggings. An innovative but controversial program that deployed plainclothes officers as decoys in high-crime areas, the SCU recruited highly trained officers of different physical types like Glatzle, who was 5 feet 2 inches tall and 100 pounds. As she wrote, "We have to be a diversified bunch. We're supposed to fade into the street picture, and in this city that has to be a mix of the whole human works. Women. Every shade of white, brown, black, yellow, red, beige."

Part of the first wave of recruits, Glatzle and her backup teams apprehended muggers, rapists, and other criminals, with Glatzle disguised as the decoy. She started to gain media attention for her work as "Muggable Mary" as early as 1972 and became a folk hero. New York City Mayor Abraham Beame presented her with the city's certificate of appreciation in 1975. By the time she published her book in 1980, she had participated in over five hundred decoy operations; during this time, she was mugged, shot at, and threatened with rape. She was promoted to Detective First Class in 1979. Her book told the story of the city's mugging epidemic from the side of law enforcement, in contrast to James Willwerth's 1974 book Jones: Portrait of a Mugger. The SCU was disbanded in 2002 in the aftermath of the Amadou Diallo killing in 1999. It was reactivated in 2015 but shut down again after the murder of George Floyd.

Valentine recalled that producer Joel T. Maffeo, the former head of production at Lorimar, was given a copy of Glatzle's book at a reunion. He liked it and subsequently hired Sandor Stern, a former physician who was also a screenwriter who had written numerous episodes of police dramas for television as well as the hit film, The Amityville Horror, to draft the screenplay and direct. When Valentine's agent suggested to Maffeo that she could play Mary, he was skeptical at first.

At the time, Valentine was best known for her Emmy Award–winning role as student teacher Alice Johnson in the hit sitcom Room 222, which aired on ABC from 1969 to 1974. She was subsequently typecast as a young ingenue. As she told an interviewer, "My character was so fumbling and clutzy, people forgot that there could be many other sides to me, so I've tried to balance my choice of characters a bit more." Although she tried to modify her image in made-for-television films like The Daughters of Joshua Cabe, Coffee, Tea or Me?, and The Girl Who Came Gift-Wrapped, she could not shed her persona of youthful innocence. For this reason, in 1979, she decided to avoid television for three years to focus on theater, appearing in plays like Born Yesterday, The Goodbye Girl, and Romantic Comedy to demonstrate that she could play roles for adult women.

After talking to Valentine, Maffeo became convinced that she could play Mary. Nevertheless, despite her credentials, CBS insisted that she read for the role. Though she was nervous and somewhat irritated, she performed two scenes, including an emotional one in which she had to cry, for a group of executives, and then bluntly asked them if she had the job or not, but they did not say yes until later in the day. In October 1981 it was publicly announced that Valentine was starring in the film.

Mary was the first real-life person and the first police officer that Valentine had portrayed. To prepare for the role, she met with Glatzle to better understand her personality. She studied Glatzle's accent, mannerisms, and demeanor to develop her characterization. She also attempted to tamp down her own natural exuberance. However, instead of impersonating her, she aimed to capture Glatzle's essence. She described Glatzle as a woman who "takes the bull by the horn and does her job .... But there are many more layers to her character. She is fallible. She is vulnerable. She is scared at the same time that she shows a lot of courage. When she is in a dangerous situation, she is no superwoman, but a vulnerable human being who digs in her heels and pulls off her job." Glatzle and her son Eric observed part of the filming, including the scenes shot in the gymnasium where Mary practices judo.

Filming was scheduled to begin on October 26, 1981, for four weeks in New York. Most of the filming took place on the Lower East Side. While Stern's script follows the broad outlines of Glatzle's book, it makes modifications for dramatic effect, including the addition of fictional characters and episodes. For example, the encounter with the Central Park killer/rapist who murders Mary's friend Donna, the film's dramatic climax, is based on Glatzle's real encounter with Bernard Deveaux, a 23-year-old man who raped multiple women in Van Cortlandt Park in the Bronx, but it diverges from her account. Specifically, none of Glatzle's friends were victims, and she did not shoot and kill the man; however, she specifically requested the members of her backup team for this operation, and they experienced problems with their radios. In addition, the script places much more emphasis on Mary's personal life, especially her conflicts with her son Eric and her rocky relationships with her father and her love interest Dan, than does Glatzle, who focuses on her experiences in the SCU. In fact, while Eric is based on Glatzle's real-life son, Dan is an invented character.

== Broadcast ==
Muggable Mary, Street Cop premiered on CBS as a CBS Special Movie Presentation on February 25, 1982. It was rebroadcast on April 27, 1983, and then aired repeatedly through the 2000s. In 1984, CBS sold a package of programming, including the film, to China Central Television (CCTV) for broadcast in Communist China. Wang Feng, the director of CCTV, selected 64 hours of programming, including football, music, news, nature, and culture shows, "to promote understanding between the Chinese and American people." Muggable Mary: Street Cop was one of only seven made-for-television films included.

Valentine suggested that the film might spawn a weekly series, but ultimately it did not. She also noted she had made six pilots up to that time, of which only one was broadcast.

== Reception ==
=== Ratings ===
Muggable Mary: Street Cop was the fourteenth most-watched program of the week ending February 28, 1982, with a 21.4 rating and 34 share. It tied for the nineteenth most-watched made-for-television film of the 1981–1982 season, out of 268 films.

=== Reviews ===
Muggable Mary: Street Cop received almost universally positive reviews, and most critics singled out Valentine's performance for special praise. James Brown of the Los Angeles Times described the film as "a well-crafted, expertly performed drama." He further remarked that Stern juggled the conflicts in the narrative "masterfully, keeping his film on a realistic course where lesser talents might have opted for formula cops and robbers. ... Good work all the way around." He also commended Valentine's performance, asserting that the film "provides something of a breakthrough for Karen Valentine ..., who for years seemed in a rut of playing the eternal ingenue, here delivers a strong, utterly convincing incarnation of a very tough lady."

Gail Williams of The Hollywood Reporter also praised the film: "Add 'Muggable Mary: Street Cop' to the growing list of TV efforts that portray policepeople with sensitivity and compassion." She lauded Valentine's performance: "Karen Valentine may not have a completely credible accent ..., but she does deliver a persuasive and compellingly restrained performance." She also notes that the film "gives Valentine ample opportunity to stretch beyond the bouncy 'Room 222' range she's most noted for previously, and stretch she does."

Lee Winfrey in the Philadelphia Inquirer remarked that "Stern's workmanlike script flashes with sharp shots and crisp action. ... The climax of the show is Mary's encounter in Central Park with a ski-masked knife-carrying rapist who has killed four of his victims. It is one of the best-played action sequences on TV this season." He also declared that "Valentine has been astutely cast as Mary. ... Miss Valentine is the perfect combination of cuddly vulnerability, pert determination and level-headed intelligence necessary to show all the colors of this role. It is impossible not to root for Mary Glatzle as she is played by Miss Valentine."

Tom Shales, the influential television critic for the Washington Post, praised the first half of the film but declared that Mary's reaction to Joe's murder, which he described as "selfish shock that she might have been the one killed," was a dramatic miscalculation that undermined the rest of the story. However, he described Valentine's performance in glowing terms: "Either all perked out, or resolved to prove herself a serious actress, Valentine brings warmth, strength and moxie to the role .... Much about the film ... is too pat and tidy, but Valentine glorifies it into something approaching honesty. ... For now, it is encouraging to see Karen Valentine with her new-found rough edges showing. Rough edges can be beautiful and, in this case, are."

John J. O'Connor of the New York Times remarked that the film focused more on personal drama than exploring the thornier issues implicated by the SCU, such as entrapment, and suggested that there was likely little resemblance between Mary and Glatzle. However, he too, commended both Valentine's and Getz's portrayals: "Valentine contributes an impressive performance, projecting the kind of unaffected maturity that should put to rest forever the pert ingenue images that have dogged her since the series days of 'Room 222.' Mr. Getz manages to be charming even while revealing the more troubling side of a character decidedly too excited by his dangerous work."

A critic for Variety gave the film a mixed review, commenting that the scenes of Mary's relationship with her son were less compelling than those showing her as a police officer. However, this critic commended Stern's direction, observing that the street scenes displayed a sense of naturalism reminiscent of early Kojak and Serpico. Pearlman's and especially Valentine's performances were also lauded: "Valentine ... shows her talent as an actress. Mary Glatzle in this instance was likable and all too human. The woman's determination comes across clearly, and Valentine, despite some intricate psychological developments with a male cop, presents a heroine of some stature."

Finally, in a rare negative review, Rick Groen dismissed the film in The Globe and Mail, but praised Valentine, remarking that she has "forsaken that Room 222 cuteness for a rough accent and a convincing intensity. There's definitely an actress lurking within that petite frame. Probably one in search of a better property."

== Home media ==
Muggable Mary: Street Cop has not been officially released on DVD. It occasionally may be found on video-sharing platforms like YouTube.

== Themes and analysis ==
Although portrayals of female undercover police officers in television are rare before Muggable Mary: Street Cop, precedents extend back to the 1950s. In the groundbreaking 1957–1958 television series Decoy, Beverly Garland plays Patricia "Casey" Jones, an undercover female officer with the NYPD. Female police officers Eve Whitfield (Barbara Anderson) and Fran Belding (Elizabeth Baur) often went undercover in the 1967–1975 police drama Ironside. In the first episode of the television series Hawaii Five-O, which aired in September 1968, female officer Joyce Weber (Patricia Smith) puts herself at risk by going undercover to help Detective Steve McGarrett (Jack Lord) catch a couple who have been murdering wealthy tourists. The 1968–1973 television series The Mod Squad features three countercultural youths, including Peggy Lipton as Julie Barnes, who become undercover police officers in Los Angeles to avoid incarceration. In the 1974–1978 television series Police Woman, Sergeant Pepper Anderson (Angie Dickinson) of the Los Angeles Police Department, often goes undercover. In addition, in the 1981 film Nighthawks, Sylvester Stallone played Detective Sergeant Deke DaSilva and Billy Dee Williams portrayed Sergeant Matthew Fox, both plainclothes officers in the SCU. In one scene in this film, three armed men attack a woman, who is actually DaSilva in disguise.

Muggable Mary: Street Cop exemplifies a shift in the representation of female police officers and private detectives on television from the 1970s to the 1980s. In 1970s series such as Police Woman, Get Christie Love!, and Charlie's Angels, these figures are portrayed not only as courageous and competent, but also as beautiful and glamorous. While this trend continued through the 1980s with shows like Partners in Crime, Lady Blue, and MacGruder & Loud, programs like Hill Street Blues and Cagney & Lacey, and to a lesser extent Hunter and Miami Vice, mark the emergence of more complex portrayals of female police officers. As scholar Jonathan Nichols-Pethick argues, in the 1980s, "Women and minorities were regularly included in casts, especially ensemble casts, in keeping with changes in the structure of police departments across the country. But these characters also brought with them a different range of sensibilities and social experiences against which crime could be understood. Furthermore, the emotional lives of characters became increasingly central to the narrative." Cagney & Lacey, for example, which stars Sharon Gless as Christine Cagney and Tyne Daly as Mary Beth Lacey, features richly etched characters who are working women navigating challenges both at home and on the job, and their emotional lives are woven into the storylines. Similarly, in her role as Mary Glatzle, Valentine portrayed a multidimensional woman who is both vulnerable and strong and who attempts to balance the often conflicting demands of her roles as mother and police officer.

The film is also significant because it features one of Valentine's most critically acclaimed performances, which demonstrated to critics that she was capable of portraying the dramatic adult roles that she had been seeking for several years. Nevertheless, although she worked consistently through the 1980s, she still was not offered the types of projects that actresses like Sally Field, who also had to fight the perception that she was too "cute" to perform adult roles, was. As she told an interviewer in 1982, "They called me to NBC the other day and there I was, reintroducing myself to the Old Guard. It's always the same executives in Hollywood; they just change networks. As I sat there, I thought, 'Don't you know me by now? Anyway, you're going to have to sit there, and if I have to talk, I'll talk; and if I have to read, I'll read. Because I've got news for you: I'm not quitting."
