= Karen (1975 TV series) =

- Genre: Sitcom
- Created by: Gene Reynolds; Larry Gelbart
- Starring: Karen Valentine; Charles Lane; Dena Dietrich; Oliver Clark; Alix Elias; Will Seltzer; Aldine King
- Country of origin: United States
- Original language: English
- No. of seasons: 1
- No. of episodes: 13

Production
- Camera setup: Multi-camera
- Running time: 25 minutes
- Production company: 20th Century-Fox Television

Original release
- Network: ABC
- Release: January 30 – May 8, 1975

Karen is an American sitcom that aired on ABC from January 30 to June 19, 1975, for 13 episodes. It stars Karen Valentine as Karen Angelo, an employee at a citizens' lobbying organization called Open America in Washington, DC. A mid-season replacement, it was canceled after four months due to low ratings. It was developed by Gene Reynolds and Larry Gelbart, the executive producers of M*A*S*H at the time. Like that series, it is partly dramatic and partly comedic and addresses political issues topical in the post-Watergate era, as well as Karen Angelo's life as a single woman.

== Plot ==
Karen Angelo (Karen Valentine) is an idealistic single woman in her late twenties who moves to Washington, DC, to work for a congressman she supported during his campaign. After he assigns her primarily secretarial tasks, however, she accepts a job at a citizens' lobbying organization called Open America. Her gruff boss is Dale Busch (Denver Pyle in the first episode and Charles Lane in the subsequent ones). Dena Madison (Dena Dietrich) is the organization's longtime office manager, a woman with a cynical and caustic sense of humor who frequently spars with her. Adam Cooperman (Will Seltzer) is a volunteer who works at the organization. Karen's roommate at her modest home at 1460 Cambridge Street in Georgetown is Cissy Peterson (Aldine King), a Black woman who works at the FBI and is not a crusader like Karen. Her neighbors include oversexed married couple Cheryl Siegle (Alix Elias) and Jerry Siegle (Oliver Clark), a law student putting himself through school by working as a bartender.

== Cast ==
Regular cast

- Karen Valentine as Karen Angelo
- Denver Pyle as Dale Busch (episode 1)
- Charles Lane as Dale Busch (episodes 2–13)
- Dena Dietrich as Dena Madison
- Aldine King as Cissy Peterson
- Alix Elias as Cheryl Siegle
- Oliver Clark as Jerry Siegle
- Will Seltzer as Adam Cooperman
- Edward Winter as Senator Robert Hartford

Notable guest cast

- Frank Aletter
- William Christopher
- Bert Convy
- David Doyle
- Marty Feldman
- Dwayne Hickman
- David Huddleston
- Ruth McDevitt
- Karen Morrow
- Dick Patterson
- Ronnie Schell
- Fred Willard

== Production ==
Karen Valentine was known in the 1970s for playing spunky, earnest, relentlessly optimistic characters. She became famous after she landed her breakout role as student teacher Alice Johnson on the sitcom Room 222, which aired on ABC from September 1969 to January 1974. She won an Emmy Award for Outstanding Performance by an Actress in a Supporting Role in Comedy in 1970 and was nominated in the same category in 1971. Confident in her star potential, ABC filmed two pilots for two different sitcoms starring the actress in 1973 and 1974, but did not develop either one into a series. During and immediately after Room 222, Valentine starred in a handful of popular made-for-television films and appeared frequently on talk, variety, and game shows, including as a semiregular on The Hollywood Squares.

In 1974, determined to find a suitable vehicle for the actress after it cancelled Room 222, ABC approached producers Gene Reynolds and Larry Gelbart without Valentine's knowledge. Reynolds had served as the executive producer of Room 222 and had cast Valentine in the series. He and Gelbart were then serving as the executive producers of the CBS sitcom M*A*S*H for 20th Century-Fox, which Gelbart had developed. Valentine stated that the pair had been interested in working with her since Room 222. Carl Kleinschmitt, who created the sitcom Funny Face starring Sandy Duncan and also wrote a couple of episodes of M*A*S*H, was brought on as producer. ABC was so confident in the show that it ordered 13 episodes. In May, Barry Diller, the network's vice president in charge of prime-time television, announced that Karen's premiere was scheduled for January 1975. Given the past successes of Valentine, Reynolds, and Gelbart, ABC anticipated that the show would be one of the "hotter situation-comedy prospects being readied for second-season duty."

Reynolds and Gelbart collaboratively developed the show's premise. The fictional organization Open America was based on Common Cause. Founded in 1970 by John W. Gardner, a Republican who served in President Lyndon B. Johnson’s cabinet, Common Cause is a nonpartisan citizens' lobbying organization. It is dedicated to government accountability, election reform, and strengthening democratic institutions. Just as he had performed considerable research on contemporary schools for Room 222, Reynolds conducted extensive research on citizens' lobbying groups as he developed Karen. In Washington, DC, he consulted with Common Cause and members of the staff of Rep. John E. Moss, who had drafted a bill establishing a consumer protection agency. He also took a political science class at UCLA. Valentine herself attended a meeting of Common Cause in Los Angeles. After the series premiered, Gelbart noted that many types of people were drawn to organizations like Open America: "Not only young people want to be involved, … but people of all ages from all walks of life. In Karen we will have many volunteers in the office of Open America including young people, a retired Navy captain, a grandmother and a 50-year-old hippie. These people are interested in their country and want to do something to help it run smoothly. Karen is comedy with content." Valentine herself commented that "there is a lot of fighting for the little guy by Open America against big bureaucracies. I like that David-and-Goliath aspect of the show, and I this format gives me a chance to be dramatic as well as comic."

Filming of Karen, a one-camera show, began in November 1974. Reynolds filmed background and exterior shots in Washington, DC, and Gelbert developed the script. Crew members from M*A*S*H, which was on hiatus, worked on the show. Casting was largely completed by December but was in flux for weeks. For example, in the first episode, Denver Pyle plays Karen Angelo's boss Dale Busch, but he is subsequently replaced by Charles Lane. Also in the first episode, one of Karen's roommates is Ernie Stone (Joseph Stern), a law student working as a bartender. However, he is transformed into a character named Jerry Siegle (Oliver Clark), also a law student working as a bartender, who is now married to Cheryl Siegle (Alix Elias). In an appearance on The Tonight Show, Valentine said that the producers originally wanted her to have a platonic male roommate but dropped the character after ABC expressed concerns.

Reynolds and Gelbart conceived the show as a "dramedy" in the vein of Room 222 and M*A*S*H anchored by Valentine. The actress told a journalist: "What pleases me about this show is that we are going for character comedy, not one-liners. It will be a realistic, intelligent show, but with a great deal of humor. Naturally, since I'm new at my job I'm going to make mistakes, but I'm playing an intelligent young woman and not some dummy." Another journalist commented that she "has been searching for a 'now' character who isn't a Woman's Libber or a young housewife. … Something in the middle seemed more like it, and Reynolds' idea of the Common Cause worker rang the bell." Reynolds stated that both Karen Valentine and Karen Angelo "are very contemporary, vital and most importantly have a zest for life. They are what is happening today—young women turned on by something other than themselves—who want to be involved." Valentine herself described her character as "an extension of me. She's upbeat, full of drive, wants to do well. She is paid a nominal salary as a volunteer for Open America." She also said that her character was more grown-up than Alice Johnson in Room 222 and that she was not playing the comedy relief this time.

Karen premiered on January 30, 1975, at 8:30 p.m., following Barney Miller at 8 p.m. and preceding The Streets of San Francisco at 9 p.m. Its competition was the second half of the hit family drama The Waltons on CBS and the new sitcom The Bob Crane Show on NBC. The opening titles show Karen Angelo riding her bicycle across Washington, DC, passing by iconic monuments like the Lincoln Memorial. Referencing George C. Scott's monologue at the beginning of the 1970 film Patton, the opening scene of the premiere episode portrays Karen Angelo marching forward from the back in front of a screen-sized American flag and then delivering a monologue. After this sequence, the television host Stephanie Edwards, whose morning show AM America had recently premiered on ABC, interviews Open America director Dale Busch and office manager Dena Madison—a device to establish the premise for the series. Later in the episode, Karen coerces a congressional committee to open its session to the public.

However, Karen was beset with problems. Some critics thought that Valentine was miscast, although others praised her performance. Alix Elias, who played Cheryl Siegle in the show, believed that the producers were unable to define the character of Karen Angelo clearly. She also suggested the producers' visions for the show may not have aligned: "Karen was a series already going when I went into it. … They decided to beef up the house situation and downplay the office." A critic had the same view, observing that the show had two situations—one at home, which focused on Karen Angelo's personal life and the other at the office, which focused on political issues—that did not gel together. The show's producer Carl Kleinschmitt commented: "It didn't work on a comedy level and it didn't expand anybody's knowledge of how Washington worked so it was just a failure on many levels. This was a show that probably needed another 13 weeks or a year to find its legs. We fiddled the characters. We changed casting. We never got a clear idea of how funny or serious it should be. Poor Karen, who's very good at what she does, was never sure what she would be doing next week. It went from one extreme to the other and I don't think we ever got a handle on it. As it turned out, nobody watched it anyway."

By early February 1975, media outlets were already predicting that Karen was destined for cancellation because of its poor ratings. On May 2, when it announced its new fall schedule, ABC confirmed that the show had been cancelled. Shortly after its cancellation, Gelbart commented: "We did Karen because the network was anxious to get Karen Valentine on in something, and they asked us to do it. What can I say? We shouldn't have done it.'" Years later he also observed: "I guess we heard cash registers ringing more than inspiration in our ears."

== Episodes ==
No.	Title	Directed by	Written by	Original release date	Prod. code
1	"Karen"	Gene Reynolds	Larry Gelbart & Carl Kleinschmitt	January 30, 1975	901
Karen prepares for an appearance before a House subcommittee in government reorganization.
2	"Them"	Hy Averback	Simon Muntner	February 6, 1975	902
Karen discovers that her home is being bugged and suspects that the office of Open America is as well.
3	"The Visitors"	Jerry Paris	Carl Kleinschmitt	February 13, 1975	906
Karen's high school friend and her husband are visiting from California and Karen is in for a big surprise.
4	"Love and Other Issues"	John Erman	John D. Hess	February 20, 1975	907
A dashing public relations man wins Karen's heart until she realizes that his motives are suspect.
5	"Whistle Blowing"	Hy Averback	Simon Muntner	February 27, 1975	905
An employee of a large company is on the verge of exposing his firm's shady practices through conversations with Karen, but is getting cold feet because of potential reprisals.
6	"Hartford Revisited"	Gene Reynolds	Richard Baer	March 6, 1975	908
Congressman Hartford asks Karen to marry him, which puts the uncertain Karen in a tight situation.
7	"Busch's Breakup"	John Erman	Karyl Miller	March 13, 1975	910
Dale has a fight with his wife and stays with Karen, who has to play marriage counselor and deal with his eccentricities.
8	"I Gave at the Office"	Gene Reynolds	Simon Muntner	March 20, 1975	903
Karen has to decide between two men who are seeking her affection.
9	"What Are Friends For?"	Jerry Paris	Simon Muntner	March 27, 1975	909
Karen comes down with an illness, but her home becomes a madhouse as all her friends try to offer help.
10	"Capitol Capers"	Gene Reynolds	John D. Hess	April 10, 1975	913
Karen heads to the Pentagon to obtain information on a specific government contract.
11	"A Day in the Life"	John Erman	Rick Mittleman	April 17, 1975	912
Karen and Congressman Blakemore face off against each other over consumer protection when they appear on a late-night talk show.
12	"The Karen Report"	Mel Ferber	Carl Kleinschmitt	May 1, 1975	911
Karen has to do background work on Congressman Hartford, but the discoveries she makes startle even him.
13	"Dena Might"	Hy Averback	Simon Muntner	May 8, 1975	904
After dating for 10 years, Dena finally receives a marriage proposal from her boyfriend Barney, who's finally decided to divorce his wife. However, Dena is uncertain and asks Karen for advice.

== Reception ==
=== Ratings ===
The premiere episode of Karen had a rating of 13.0 and a share of 19. For the 1974–1975 season as a whole, the show ranked at 71 out of 84 shows (by contrast, M*A*S*H ranked at 5), with an average rating of 14.5.

=== Reviews ===
Reviews of Karen were mixed. The Hollywood Reporter praised the show: "'Karen' is a show that has a terrific premise and the presence of Karen Valentine. The first episode … was well written … and … showed some imagination, an awareness of today's times, and intelligent humor. … Gene Reynolds, who directed the initial episode, and Gelbart must physically be involved with this show. They can't just lend their names and leave it to Carl Kleinschmitt who has a habit of getting the 'cutes.' Don't desert Karen, guys, because you'll ruin the series."

Variety was more critical: "The debut show had telltale signs of cutesy-pie all through it, presumably the elements its makers will try to eliminate. … Blurred view of the series cannot conceal its potential assets, mainly Valentine, a performer viewers have proven they will watch … . Drawbacks are the lack of comic people to bounce things off of, perhaps story lines as well … , plus the apparent misconception that Valentine is strong enough to carry the series single-handedly (an error producer Carl Kleinschmitt previously made with Sandy Duncan). Series prospects are dim unless radical changes occur."

The Los Angeles Times declared: "The trick is to balance the humor with enough sting so it hurts. Gelbart and Reynolds are masters at the irreverent wisecrack in MASH." The Pittsburgh Press echoed this sentiment. It expected the show to be more sophisticated given that Reynolds and Gelbart were the executive producers of M*A*S*H, but noted that instead the show "got its comedy from cute jokes and double entendres about the government, the people, and the leaders of both. Let's face it, folks, the U.S. government just isn't cute."

In a lengthy review, the New York Times stated that the show had promise, but that Valentine was miscast: "'Karen' is really quite witty. A good idea, good writers and a good director got together and had fun. The political humor—although it seems directed primarily to that saving remnant of McGovern voters inside and outside the state of Massachusetts—scores consistently." It continued: "The problem, I'm afraid, is Miss Valentine. … Every time Miss Valentine wins a skirmish with the armies of the night, she seems to have won because she's cute. Oh, she does her homework, teaching us something about government in the process; but the larger, lingering impression is one of surprise. She does not threaten; she squeaks. … Thus, while the program is puffed up with excellent intentions, it inadvertently condescends. … An actress of Diana Rigg's steely intelligence would be more appropriate in these circumstances; as it is, the spirit of Disney overwhelms the issues."

In a page-long review in TV Guide, Cleveland Amory also gave the show a mixed reception: "that premiere had some good stuff in it … . It also had some awfully silly stuff. … This show has good intentions, but it also has a severe case of the cutes. … Valentine is pretty, and she has her moments—even if it sometimes seems that her role is a size too large for her. As for the others, Charles Lane is crotchety-funny and dena Dietrich … is perhaps the best of all. In short, a recovery is possible—but it will take major surgery."

== Release ==
Karen aired on ABC from January 30 to June 19, 1975. It was never syndicated. The cable network TV Land aired two episodes on January 17, 1998, when it was airing Room 222. The show has not been released on DVD or made available on streaming platforms. The UCLA Film & Television Archive in Los Angeles has copies of a few episodes.

== Themes and analysis ==
In the early 1970s, as the Vietnam War dragged on and the Watergate scandal, which culminated with President Richard M. Nixon's resignation on August 9, 1974, erupted, many Americans grew cynical and lost faith in government institutions. During the post-Watergate era, Congress passed a wave of reforms to strengthen ethical standards for government officials, restore public accountability, and increase transparency. Reynolds and Gelbart referred directly to this political context as they developed the premise of Karen—specifically by making her an idealistic employee of Open America. Kleinschmitt remarked that Reynolds in particular wanted to make a show about politics in the aftermath of Nixon's resignation. Reynolds himself told one journalist: "We won't reflect the daily news, but we'll try to keep the show topical in relation to events in Washington." Similarly, Valentine commented: "I really think it is a fabulous idea for a show because we can take up issues in an entertainment format." For example, in Karen Angelo's monologue at the beginning of the premiere episode, she remarks that "America has not had a king since … August 1974." Later in the episode, when she expresses her fear of testifying before a congressional subcommittee because of her inexperience, Dena Madison tells her: "You should feel right at home; plenty of congressmen aren't ready either."

While Reynolds and Gelbart attempted to model Karen after sitcoms like Room 222 and M*A*S*H by combining comedy with social commentary, their efforts were only partly successful. As one critic observed, balancing Karen Angelo's role as a citizens' advocate with her innate optimism was a challenging task: "This is difficult to do particularly in the post-Watergate cynicism that has afflicted much of the nation when Washington, D.C., is mentioned." Furthermore, as the show progressed, it became less focused on political issues and more focused on Karen Angelo's personal life. The scholar Katherine J. Lehman observes that Karen Angelo "is more politicized at her sitcom's outset. … Ultimately, Karen's conflicts tend to revolve less around national politics than whether she should date an employee of a corporate public relations firm that is antagonistic to Open America, or how she should deal with a friend's husband who works for the timber industry. Like the heroines before her, she voices her political principles but also tries to make peace with less enlightened men."

Karen is also memorable as one of the first network sitcoms set in the political milieu of Washington, DC. Subsequent ones include All's Fair, Murphy Brown, Women of the House, DAG, and 1600 Penn.

== For further reading ==
- Amory, Cleveland. "Review: Karen." TV Guide, April 26, 1975: 14.
- Cameron, Sue. "Coast to Coast." The Hollywood Reporter, October 29, 1974, 6.
- Diehl, Digby. "Karen Valentine of Karen." TV Guide, March 15, 1975: 20–24.
- Hyatt, Wesley. Short-Lived Television Series, 1948–1978, 232–233. Jefferson, NC: McFarland & Company, Inc., Publishers, 2003.
- "Karen (1975)." Television Obscurities.
- Laurent, Lawrence. "Optimism Will Keep 'Karen' on the Air." St. Petersburg Times, February 6, 1975, 30-D.
- Lehman, Katherine J. Those Girls: Single Women in Sixties and Seventies Popular Culture. Lawrence: University Press of Kansas, 2011 (ebook ed.).
- Leszczak, Bob. Single Season Sitcoms, 1948–1979: A Complete Guide, 99–100. Jefferson, NC: McFarland & Company, Inc., Publishers, 2012.
- Lewellen, Scott. Funny You Should Ask: Oral Histories of Classic Sitcome Storytellers, 337–338. Jefferson, NC: McFarland & Company, Inc., Publishers, 2013 (ebook ed.).
- Vrooman, Gayle. "Karen Valentine Plays Karen on ABC-TV Tuesday Evenings." St. Joseph News-Press, February 22, 1975, 2.
