= Spelling-Goldberg Productions =

American television production company

- Type: Subsidiary
- Industry: Television production
- Founded: May 1, 1972; 54 years ago
- Founder: Aaron Spelling; Leonard Goldberg
- Defunct: May 1986
- Fate: Folded into Columbia Pictures Television
- Products: Family; Starsky & Hutch; T. J. Hooker; S.W.A.T. Charlie's Angels; Fantasy Island; Hart to Hart
- Owner: The Coca-Cola Company (1982–1986)
- Parent: Columbia Pictures (1982–1983); CPT Holdings (1983–1986)

Spelling-Goldberg Productions was an American television production company established on May 1, 1972 by Aaron Spelling and Screen Gems' top TV executive Leonard Goldberg. They produced series during the 1970s including Family, Starsky & Hutch, T. J. Hooker, S.W.A.T., Charlie's Angels, Fantasy Island, and Hart to Hart. Spelling's other companies, Aaron Spelling Productions (later known as Spelling Entertainment and Spelling Television) and Thomas-Spelling Productions, co-existed at the same time period and produced other well-known shows. A majority of the series produced by Spelling-Goldberg originally aired on ABC.

== History ==
In 1973, Spelling-Goldberg struck a deal with Metromedia Producers Corporation to distribute the post-1973 output for off-net syndication, including TV movies and the new Chopper One. It was involved in a lawsuit with Worldvision Enterprises (previously ABC Films), the very first distributor of The Rookies; following the lawsuit, domestic syndication of The Rookies would be contracted out to Viacom Enterprises, which would distribute the program through the 1990s.

Spelling and Goldberg eventually decided to part ways, and in mid-June 1977, the studio sold domestic distribution rights to the following series to Columbia Pictures Television: S.W.A.T., Starsky & Hutch, Charlie's Angels and Family. On May 7, 1982, the company was sold to Columbia Pictures for more than $40 million, and by May 1986, Spelling-Goldberg ceased its remaining active operations. Thus, Sony Pictures Television currently owns most of the entire Spelling-Goldberg library (including series produced in association with predecessor Columbia Pictures Television).

== List of programs ==
=== TV shows ===
All series are currently owned and distributed by Sony Pictures Television and were previously distributed by its predecessors such as Columbia Pictures Television and Columbia TriStar Television (except for The Rookies, itself previously distributed by Viacom Enterprises). Some programs were previously distributed outside the United States through Metromedia Producers Corporation and that company's successor, 20th Television.

- The Rookies (1972–1976)
- Chopper One (1974)
- S.W.A.T. (1975–1976)
- Starsky & Hutch (1975–1979)
- Charlie's Angels (1976–1981)
- Family (1976–1980)
- Fantasy Island (1977–1984, produced in association with Columbia Pictures Television)
- Hart to Hart (1979–1984)
- T. J. Hooker (1982–1986)

=== Made for TV movies ===
==== For The ABC Movie of the Week ====
- The Daughters of Joshua Cabe (1972)
- No Place to Run (1972)
- Say Goodbye, Maggie Cole (1972)
- The Bounty Man (1972)
- Home for the Holidays (1972)
- A Cold Night's Death (1973)
- Snatched (1973)
- The Great American Beauty Contest (1973)
- The Bait (1973)
- The Letters (1973)
- Satan's School for Girls (1973)
- Hijack (1973)
- Letters from Three Lovers (1973)
- The Affair (1973)
- The Girl Who Came Gift-Wrapped (1974)
- The Death Squad (1974)
- Cry Panic (1974)
- Savages (1974)
- Death Sentence (1974)
- Hit Lady (1974)
- Death Cruise (1974)
- Only with Married Men (1974)
- The Daughters of Joshua Cable Return (1975)

==== For The ABC [Insert Day] Night Movie ====
See The ABC Monday Night Movie and The ABC Sunday Night Movie

- Murder on Flight 502 (1975)
- The Legend of Valentino (1975)
- One of My Wives is Missing (1976)
- Charlie's Angels (1976)
- The New Daughters of Joshua Cabe (1976)
- Death at Love House (1976)
- 33 Hours in the Life of God (1976)
- The Sad and Lonely Sundays (1976)
- The Boy in the Plastic Bubble (1976)
- Little Ladies of the Night (1977)
- Beach Patrol (1979)

=== Others ===
- Stone (1973 failed pilot starring Robert Hooke)
- California Split (1974 theatrical film released by Columbia Pictures)
- Where's the Fire? (1975 comedy pilot)
- Baby Blue Marine (1976 theatrical film released by Columbia Pictures)

== See also ==
- Spelling Television
- Columbia Pictures Television
- Metromedia Producers Corporation
