= The Fireman's Ball (1974 film) =

- Genre: Comedy
- Starring: Fred Grandy; Ted Knight; Johnny Brown; David Ketchum
- Country of origin: United States
- Original language: English

Production
- Executive producers: Leonard Goldberg; Aaron Spelling
- Running time: 30 minutes
- Production company: Spelling-Goldberg Productions

Original release
- Network: American Broadcasting Company
- Release: June 9, 1974

The Fireman's Ball is a 1974 American TV movie.

== Cast ==
- Fred Grandy
- Ted Knight
- Johnny Brown
- David Ketchum
