= Many, Many Monkeys =

- The Twilight Zone episode
- Episode no.: Season 3 Episode 26
- Directed by: Ryszard Bugajski
- Written by: William Froug
- Original air date: March 18, 1989

Guest appearances
- Karen Valentine as Claire Hendricks; Jackie Burroughs as Mrs. Reed; Ken Pogue as Dr. Friedman; Jan Filips as Dr. Peterson; Norah Grant as Susan; John Gardiner as Mr. Reed

Episode chronology
← Previous "Rendezvous in a Dark Place"	Next → "Love is Blind"

"Many, Many Monkeys" is an episode of the television series The Twilight Zone, first broadcast in 1989. The episode was written in 1964 for the final season of the original The Twilight Zone series by producer William Froug, but though CBS bought the script, they chose not to use it. Froug believed that they found it "too grotesque." It remained shelved for more than twenty years until it was made as an episode in the third and final season of the 1980s Twilight Zone revival. The episode is a medical drama centering on an epidemic which causes people to go blind.

== Plot ==
Shortly after entering a hospital emergency room, Mrs. Reed goes blind from cataracts. While Nurse Claire Hendricks is visiting her hospital room, Mrs. Reed tells her that they are two of a kind. Uninterested in her cryptic remarks, Claire leaves. Mr. Reed is brought to the hospital, having been abandoned by Mrs. Reed after he started going blind.

The spontaneous cataract development proves to be an epidemic. Claire, despite her incredible workload, visits with Mrs. Reed again. Mrs. Reed again says they are alike and claims the blindness is divine retribution on a human race that has become indifferent to suffering, like monkeys—see no evil, speak no evil, etc.

A report surfaces that an explosion at a biological research laboratory released several unstable forms of bacteria into the atmosphere just hours before the outbreak. Claire tells Dr. Peterson that she is nonetheless now convinced that Mrs. Reed is right, and she feels that she herself has become unfeeling towards her patients and to her own husband. Dr. Peterson argues that she has only maintained the professional distance necessary to do her job, but she is unconvinced. After talking to him, Claire succumbs to blindness.

A surgery is developed to remove the cataracts. Dr. Peterson asks Mrs. Reed to visit Claire and cheer her. Though she has not yet had the surgery, Mrs. Reed is hopeful and convinced that the discovery of the bacteria proves she was wrong. However, Claire argues that the presence of a scientific explanation for the epidemic does not mean it is not divine retribution, and that if they treat themselves with surgery, the same affliction will strike them down in another form. Concerned, Mrs. Reed asks Dr. Peterson if Claire will have the surgery. He says "An operation isn't the answer in her case", as Claire's eyes are clear and her blindness is psychosomatic.
