= Money on the Side =

1982 American made-for-television film

- Genre: Drama
- Teleplay by: Eugene Price; Robert L. Collins
- Story by: Mort Fine
- Directed by: Robert L. Collins
- Starring: Karen Valentine; Jamie Lee Curtis; Linda Purl; Christopher Lloyd
- Music by: Richard Bellis
- Country of origin: United States
- Original language: English

Production
- Executive producers: Allen S. Epstein; Jim Green
- Producer: Hal Landers
- Cinematography: Fred J. Koenekamp
- Editor: Donald R. Rode
- Running time: 100 minutes
- Production companies: Columbia Pictures Television; Green/Epstein Productions

Original release
- Network: ABC
- Release: September 29, 1982

Money on the Side is a 1982 American made-for-television drama film starring Karen Valentine, Jamie Lee Curtis, and Linda Purl.

== Plot ==
Janice Vernon is married to traveling salesman Nelson, and has a son with special needs. The couple are experiencing severe financial hardships, and Janice lists her home for sale by Karen's Gordon's realty firm. When her house doesn't sell, Karen offers Janice a way to become a prostitute. Janice feels she can't do it, but eventually the need for money overcomes her feelings and she begins working as an "escort" for Karen. Michelle Jamison is a highly educated secretary who likes the thrill of hooking. She sees it as being in control. Her estranged husband has a drinking problem, and she uses some of the money she earns as a prostitute to fix her car after her husband wrecks it while driving drunk. Annie Gilson is studying for her real estate license with Karen Gordon, and is also saving her money to buy a house. She is married and has a young daughter, but her abusive husband has no idea she turns tricks on the side.

The three women become friends as they work together. The police are aware of Karen's firm being a front for her escort business, and eventually she is arrested, along with her working girls. Annie, afraid of what will happen when her loved ones find out, commits suicide by hanging herself in jail. Janice tries to explain to her husband that she did what she felt she had to do. She tells him, "we're just people," but he still leaves her.

== Cast ==
- Karen Valentine as Janice Vernon
- Jamie Lee Curtis as Michelle Jamison
- Linda Purl as Annie Gilson
- Christopher Lloyd as Sergeant Stampone
- Richard Masur as Nelson Vernon
- Gary Graham as Jack Gilson
- Edward Edwards as Paul
- John Bennett Perry as Tom Westmore
- Joe Lambie as Chip Jamison
- Susan Flannery as Karen Gordon
- Arthur Rosenberg as Mason Hutchons
- Lee de Broux as Claude
- Terry Burns as Louis
- John H. Fields as Judge Evans
- Sarina C. Grant as Nina
- Pat Studstill as cowboy
- Kenneth Washington as Detective White
- Adele Rosse as Mrs. Gersh
- Mary McDonnell as Terri
- Micole Mercurio as Donna Pallizzano
- Paul Brennan as Russell
- Eric Milota as Scottie
- Francesca P. Roberts as clerk

== Production ==
Money on the Side was produced by Hal Landers, with executive producers Allen Epstein and Jim Green. The film was directed by Robert Collins, who wrote the script with Eugene Price, based on a story written by Mort Fine. In promotional blurbs, the story was described as true, with the screenplay being based on interviews.

Richard Bellis composed the music. Grady Hunt designed the costumes. Ross Bellah and William L. Campbell served as art directors.

Filming began in July 1982. Fred J. Koenekamp directed photography, with Donald R. Rode editing.

== Themes ==
Green and Epstein stated that one of the themes of the film is the restricted opportunities for women to earn extra income in times of economic hardship. Linda Purl stated that the film makes clear that prostitution is not a solution but also avoids moralizing.

== Release ==
The film premiered on ABC September 29, 1982.

== Reception ==
Fred Rothenberg, reviewing for the Associated Press, commended the film for its lack of "cheap, sordid exhibitionism". Rothenberg praised the script, particularly noting how it demonstrates the different motives each of the three women have for pursuing prostitution. Rothenberg stated that ABC's presentation was "responsible", noting that the film has neither sex scenes nor violence, and is clear in not portraying sex work as glamorous.

Leslie Halliwell described it as being "of no particular social or entertainment value". Steven H. Scheuer, conversely, called it "offbeat and interesting".

=== Audience reception ===
Money on the Side ranked number ten in the Nielsen ratings the first week it aired.
