= Death Sentence (1974 film) =

1974 American made-for-television film

- Genre: Crime; Mystery; Thriller
- Based on: After the Trial by Eric Roman
- Teleplay by: John Neufeld
- Directed by: E.W. Swackhamer
- Starring: Cloris Leachman; Laurence Luckinbill; Nick Nolte; Alan Oppenheimer
- Music by: Laurence Rosenthal
- Country of origin: United States
- Original language: English

Production
- Producers: Aaron Spelling; Leonard Goldberg
- Cinematography: Tim Southcott
- Editor: Leon Carrere
- Running time: 74 minutes
- Production companies: Spelling-Goldberg Productions; 20th Century Fox Television

Original release
- Network: ABC
- Release: October 2, 1974

Death Sentence (also titled Murder One) is a 1974 American made-for-television crime film directed by E.W. Swackhamer and starring Cloris Leachman and Laurence Luckinbill. It is based on the 1968 novel After the Trial by Eric Roman.

== Plot ==
A juror in a murder case begins to believe that the man on trial is innocent of the crime, and then discovers that the real killer is actually her own husband.

== Cast ==
- Cloris Leachman as Susan Davies
- Laurence Luckinbill as Don Davies
- Nick Nolte as John Healy
- Alan Oppenheimer as Lubell
- William Schallert as Tanner
- Yvonne Wilder as Elaine Croft
- Herb Voland as Lowell Hayes
- Hope Summers as Emily Boylan
- Peter Hobbs as Judge
- Doreen Lang as Mrs. Cottard
- Murray MacLeod as Martin Gorman
- Bing Russell as Trooper
- Meg Wyllie as Mae Sinclair
- Lew Brown as Mr. Bowman
- C.J. Hincks as Marilyn Healy
- Vernon Weddle as Hayden
- Robert Cleaves as Dr. Braun
- Jack Collins as Willis Wright
- Dick Winslow as Barman
- Pat Patterson as Jury Guard
- Morgan Englund as Bobby
- Dinah Englund as Pru

== See also ==
- List of American films of 1974
