= Little Ladies of the Night =

1977 American television film

- Genre: Drama
- Written by: Hal Sitowitz
- Directed by: Marvin J. Chomsky
- Starring: David Soul; Louis Gossett Jr.; Linda Purl
- Music by: Jerry Fielding
- Country of origin: United States
- Original language: English

Production
- Executive producers: Leonard Goldberg; Aaron Spelling
- Producer: Hal Sitowitz
- Production location: Los Angeles
- Cinematography: Dennis Dalzell
- Editor: George W. Brooks
- Running time: 100 minutes
- Production company: Spelling-Goldberg Productions

Original release
- Network: ABC
- Release: January 16, 1977

Little Ladies of the Night is a 1977 American made-for-television drama film starring David Soul, Louis Gossett Jr. and Linda Purl. When it was broadcast, it became the highest-rated TV movie of all time.

== Plot ==
Pretty young Hailey Atkins runs away from oblivious father Frank and jealous stepmother Marilyn, eventually arriving in Los Angeles. Ending up on Hollywood Boulevard, she is "befriended" by prostitute Maureen, who eventually "turns out" Hailey as part of Maureen's pimp "Comfort"'s "stable". Hailey comes to the attention of ex-pimp and current Los Angeles Police detective Kyle York, whose sister was murdered while working the streets a few years ago, and his partner Officer Russ Garfield, who are both working to help underage girls working in prostitution. Refused help from her own family, deep down Hailey wants to go straight, but has great difficulty escaping "Comfort" and has nowhere else to go.

== Cast ==
- David Soul as Lyle York
- Louis Gossett Jr. as Russ Garfield
- Linda Purl as Hailey Atkins
- Clifton Davis as Comfort
- Carolyn Jones as Marilyn Atkins
- Paul Burke as Frank Atkins
- Lana Wood as Maureen
- Kathleen Quinlan as Karen Brodwick
- Vic Tayback as Finch
- Katherine Helmond as Miss Colby
- Dorothy Malone as Maggie
- Bibi Osterwald as Matron

== Production ==
The film was one of a series of TV movies about teen prostitutes which followed Taxi Driver, another being Dawn: Portrait of a Teenage Runaway.

== Reception ==
The Los Angeles Times thought it had "wavering credibility". It was the highest-rated program of its night, with a 36.9 rating and 53 share, seen by 26,270,000 households. ABC claimed this made it the highest-rated TV movie of all time as it surpassed the 36.5 average rating for Helter Skelter (although the second part of Helter Skelter had a higher rating of 37.5). The rating for a made-for-TV movie was only bettered by 1983's The Day After.

At the time of its broadcast, it was the twelfth-highest-rated movie to air on network television.
