= Leonard Goldberg =

American film and television producer (1934–2019)

- Born: January 24, 1934; New York City, New York, U.S.
- Died: December 4, 2019 (aged 85); Los Angeles, California, U.S.
- Occupations: Film producer Television producer
- Spouse: Wendy J. Howard (m. 1972)
- Children: 1, 2 stepsons including John

Leonard J. Goldberg (January 24, 1934 – December 4, 2019) was an American film and television producer. He had his own production company, Panda Productions (formerly Mandy Films, and earlier Daydream Productions when he was working with Jerry Weintraub). He served as head of programming for ABC, and was president of 20th Century Fox. Goldberg was also the executive producer of the CBS series Blue Bloods.

== Early life and education ==
Goldberg was born on January 24, 1934, to a Jewish family, the son of Jean (née Smith) and William Goldberg. He was a graduate of New Utrecht High School in Brooklyn and the Wharton School at the University of Pennsylvania where he received a B.S. in economics in 1955.

== Career ==
As a producer, he was responsible for producing several television films, including the Peabody Award–winning Brian's Song (1971) and The Boy in the Plastic Bubble (1976); the latter helping to launch John Travolta's movie career. He also produced a string of hit television series while in partnership with Aaron Spelling; the best-known being Charlie's Angels, Hart to Hart, Starsky & Hutch, Fantasy Island and Family. He produced the Oscar-nominated movie WarGames (1983) as well as the comedy The Bad News Bears in Breaking Training (1977). He also partnered with producer Jerry Weintraub in the late 1970s, working on the television show When the Whistle Blows, and had development contracts with ABC and Universal Pictures. In 1981, he received an agreement with MGM/UA Entertainment Co. to produce and distribute TV shows as well as feature films under the Mandy Productions (later Mandy Films) company. He subsequently left MGM in 1984 to sign with Paramount Pictures to produce films and TV shows.

He also produced the Emmy Award–winning television film Something About Amelia, which aired on ABC in 1984. It was one of the highest-rated television films of the year, watched by around 60–70 million people.

Goldberg served as president of 20th Century Fox from 1987 to 1989, during which time the studio produced such films as Broadcast News, Big, Die Hard, Wall Street and Working Girl. Under his own banner, Goldberg produced the successful motion picture features WarGames, Sleeping with the Enemy, Double Jeopardy and the Charlie's Angels films series. He also produced Unknown, starring Liam Neeson, Diane Kruger, January Jones and Frank Langella, released in theaters in February 2011. After he left 20th Century Fox in 1989, he moved to The Walt Disney Studios to serve as a film producer, before going back to Fox to sign a feature film production contract. In the late 1990s, he worked at Universal Studios as a film producer.

He has a star on the Hollywood Walk of Fame at 6901 Hollywood Boulevard and was inducted into the Academy of Television Arts and Sciences Hall of Fame in 2007. He was a member of Wilshire Boulevard Temple.

Goldberg served on the CBS Board of Directors from 2007 to 2018.

== Personal life and death ==
In 1972, he married Wendy Howard. He had one daughter, Amanda Erin Goldberg and two stepsons, Richard Mirisch and Beverly Hills City Councilmember John A. Mirisch.

Goldberg died at Cedars-Sinai Medical Center in Los Angeles on December 4, 2019, as a result of injuries sustained in a fall. He was 85 years old. The series finale of Blue Bloods was dedicated to his memory.

== Filmography ==
He was a producer in all films unless otherwise noted.

=== Film ===
Year	Film	Credit	Notes
1974	California Split	Executive producer	
1976	Baby Blue Marine		
1977	The Bad News Bears in Breaking Training		
1981	All Night Long		
1983	WarGames	Executive producer	
1986	SpaceCamp	Executive producer	
1991	Sleeping with the Enemy		
1992	The Distinguished Gentleman		
1993	Aspen Extreme		
1999	Double Jeopardy		
2000	Charlie's Angels		
2003	Charlie's Angels: Full Throttle		
2011	Unknown		
2019	Charlie's Angels	Executive producer	Final film as a producer

As an actor

Year	Film	Role	Notes
2007	The Underdog's Tale	Hank	Direct-to-video

=== Television ===
Year	Title	Credit	Notes
1972	The Daughters of Joshua Cabe	Executive producer	Television film
1972	No Place to Run	Executive producer	Television film
1972	Say Goodbye, Maggie Cole		Television film
1972	The Bounty Man		Television film
1972	Home for the Holidays	Executive producer	Television film
1972	Every Man Needs One	Executive producer	Television film
1973	A Cold Night's Death	Executive producer	Television film
1973	Snatched	Executive producer	Television film
1973	The Great American Beauty Contest	Executive producer	Television film
1973	The Letters	Executive producer	Television film
1973	The Bait	Executive producer	Television film
1973	Satan's School for Girls		Television film
1973	Hijack		Television film
1973	Letters from Three Lovers		Television film
1973	The Affair	Executive producer	Television film
1974	The Death Squad		Television film
1974	Firehouse	Executive producer	
1974	Chopper One	Executive producer	
1974	The Girl Who Came Gift-Wrapped		Television film
1974	Cry Panic		Television film
1974	Savages		Television film
1974	Death Sentence		Television film
1974	Hit Lady		Television film
1974	Death Cruise		Television film
1974	Only with Married Men	Executive producer	Television film
1974	The Fireman's Ball	Executive producer	Television film
1975	The Daughters of Joshua Cabe Return	Executive producer	Television film
1975	The Fireman's Ball	Executive producer	Television pilot
1975	Murder on Flight 502	Executive producer	Television film
1975	The Legend of Valentino		Television film
1976	One of My Wives Is Missing	Executive producer	Television film
1976	The New Daughters of Joshua Cabe	Executive producer	Television film
1976	Death at Love House	Executive producer	Television film
1976	33 Hours in the Life of God		Television film
1976	The Sad and Lonely Sundays	Executive producer	Television film
1976	The Boy in the Plastic Bubble	Executive producer	Television film
1972−76	The Rookies	Executive producer	
1975−76	S.W.A.T.	Executive producer	
1977	Little Ladies of the Night	Executive producer	Television film
1977	Delta County, U.S.A.	Executive producer	Television film
1979	Beach Patrol	Executive producer	Television film
1975−79	Starsky & Hutch	Executive producer	
1980	When the Whistle Blows	Executive producer	
1980	Blue Jeans	Executive producer	Television film
1976−80	Family	Executive producer	
1981	This House Possessed	Executive producer	Television film
1976−81	Charlie's Angels	Executive producer	
1982	Fantasies	Executive producer	Television film
1982	Paper Dolls	Executive producer	Television film
1983	Deadly Lessons	Executive producer	Television film
1982−83	Gavilan	Executive producer	
1984	Something About Amelia	Executive producer	Television film
1984	Sins of the Past	Executive producer	Television film
1984	Paper Dolls	Executive producer	
1977−84	Fantasy Island	Executive producer	
1979−84	Hart to Hart	Executive producer	
1985	Royal Match	Executive producer	Television film
1985	Beverly Hills Cowgirl Blues		Television film
1986	Alex: The Life of a Child	Executive producer	Television film
1982−86	T. J. Hooker	Executive producer	
1987	Home	Executive producer	Television film
1988	The Cavanaughs	Executive producer	
1993	Class of '96	Executive producer	
1999	Love Letters	Executive producer	Television film
2000	Runaway Virus	Executive producer	Television film
2002	Critical Assembly	Executive producer	Television film
2009	Limelight	Executive producer	Television film
2011	Charlie's Angels	Executive producer	
2018	Untitled Paul Attanasio Project	Executive producer	Television pilot
2010−20	Blue Bloods	Executive producer	

Thanks

Year	Title	Role
2019	Blue Bloods	In loving memory of our founder and mentor

Business positions
Preceded by Edgar J. Scherick	Vice President, Programs ABC; 1966–1969	Succeeded by Martin Starger
