= Death at Love House =

1976 American made-for-television film

- Genre: Horror; Mystery
- Written by: James Barnett
- Directed by: E.W. Swackhamer
- Starring: Robert Wagner; Kate Jackson; Sylvia Sidney; Marianna Hill
- Music by: Laurence Rosenthal
- Country of origin: United States
- Original language: English

Production
- Executive producers: Aaron Spelling; Leonard Goldberg
- Producer: Hal Sitowitz
- Cinematography: Dennis Dalzell
- Editor: John Woodcock
- Running time: 74 minutes
- Production company: Spelling-Goldberg Productions

Original release
- Network: ABC
- Release: September 3, 1976

Death at Love House (a.k.a. The Shrine of Lorna Love) is a 1976 American made-for-television horror film directed by E.W. Swackhamer and starring Robert Wagner, Kate Jackson, Sylvia Sidney and Marianna Hill. The film aired on the ABC network on September 3, 1976.

== Plot ==
While on a tour in Hollywood, a young couple, Joel and Donna Gregory, arrive at the house of Lorna Love, an infamous actress who died in 1935. There, they meet with housekeeper Clara Josephs and agent Oscar Payne, to investigate the mystery behind Lorna and finish a book that they are writing on the actress, an interest that came out of the discovery that Joel's father was her lover. While staying at the mansion, unusual incidents occur. The couple notice a portrait of Lorna, painted by Joel's father, and shortly after, Donna catches a 1930s-dressed woman at the center-located shrine in the garden, wherein Lorna's embalmed body rests on permanent display.

At their first night, they are visited by film director Conan Carroll, who directed Lorna in her first breakthrough film Gone of Desire. Conan claims that Lorna ruined his life, and that Joel Sr. was the only person ever to walk away from her, after telling her that she had no soul. He wants to exit the mansion, leaving Joel and Donna with even more questions. As Conan leaves, he is attacked by a creature, falls in the fountain and drowns following a heart attack. While processing this information, Donna finds a blade that was commonly used in witchcraft and one of her photos torn apart. Joel, meanwhile, tries to find out more on a locked room, and learns through Clara that it was Joel Sr. and Lorna's bedroom.

Joel and Donna visit aged actress Denise Christian, a former rival of Lorna at a set for a commercial. Lorna tried to blackball her at every studio as soon as Denise became as big of a star as her. Denise first met Joel Sr. at the studio - where Joel Sr. was working in the art department - and Lorna stole him from her just to bug Denise. Denise eventually reveals that Lorna contacted a healer for eternal beauty and youth, and could not sleep ever since: after Joel Sr. smashed all the mirrors and left, she lived in the spiritual world of the healer, "Father Eternal Fire."

At the mansion, Joel finds a book about witch spells, and becomes obsessed with Lorna, fantasizing about her. Meanwhile, the same man who scared Conan tries to murder Donna through carbon monoxide poisoning in a locked bathroom, and Joel and Clara appear in time to save her. Donna initially insists on leaving, but decides to support Joel, who explains that he is near discovering Lorna's secrets and thus cannot leave yet. They next meet with Marcella Geffenhart, Lorna's self-proclaimed best friend. She tells them about "Father Eternal Fire", a spiritual man, though refuses to elaborate on the witchcraft blade that Donna found. Donna later claims that Marcella is the woman who ran past Lorna's shrine on the first day of their arrival. She wants to continue meeting with Marcella. Joel forbids her from doing so, explaining that Lorna deserves to have secrets.

That evening – in an obsessed rage - Joel breaks into Lorna's bedroom and reads about details of Joel Sr.'s affair with her. Donna, meanwhile, has again spotted the woman from day one and reaches out to Joel for help. The next morning, Donna meets with Oscar, who reveals that part of the healer's activities involved fire, and that Joel is not safe in the mansion. Donna hurries to save Joel, and finds a terrified Marcella at the mansion along with the blade cut through a photo of her. While looking around, she finds a rubber mask, a gray-hair wig and dress hanging on a hook, and realizes that "Clara Josephs" is actually a very much alive (and psychotic) Lorna Love. She rushes to save Joel, who does not recognize her and instead turns to Clara/Lorna. While under her spell, Joel kisses her at the shrine and fire breaks out. Donna goes in to save Joel, and leaves Clara/Lorna to burn to death. The supposed body of Lorna in the shrine melts in the fire, revealing it to have been a wax figure all along. The mansion is closed for good and the Gregorys leave to return home.

== Cast ==
- Robert Wagner as Joel Gregory (Jr. & Sr.)
- Kate Jackson as Donna Gregory
- Sylvia Sidney as Clara Josephs
- Marianna Hill as Lorna Love
- Joan Blondell as Marcella Geffenhart
- John Carradine as Conan Carroll
- Dorothy Lamour as Denise Christian
- Bill Macy as Oscar Payne
- Joseph Bernard as Bus Driver
- John A. Zee as Eric Herman
- Robert Gibbons as Director
- Al Hansen as Policeman
- Crofton Hardester as Actor in Film
