= The Death Squad (film) =

1974 American television film by Harry Falk

- Genre: Crime; Drama
- Written by: James D. Buchanan; Ronald Austin
- Directed by: Harry Falk
- Starring: Robert Forster; Michelle Phillips; Claude Akins; Mark Goddard; Melvyn Douglas
- Music by: Dave Grusin
- Country of origin: United States
- Original language: English

Production
- Producers: Leonard Goldberg; Aaron Spelling
- Cinematography: Tim Southcott
- Editor: Stefan Arnsten
- Running time: 74 minutes
- Production companies: Spelling-Goldberg Productions; 20th Century Fox Television

Original release
- Network: ABC
- Release: January 8, 1974

The Death Squad is a 1974 American made-for-television crime drama film directed by Harry Falk and starring Robert Forster, Michelle Phillips, Claude Akins, Mark Goddard and Melvyn Douglas.

== Plot ==
A cop goes after a group of police who have turned vigilante.

== Cast ==
- Robert Forster as Eric Benoit
- Michelle Phillips as Joyce Kreski
- Claude Akins as Connie Brennan
- Mark Goddard as Allen Duke
- Melvyn Douglas as Captain Earl Kreski
- Dennis Patrick as The Commissioner
- George Murdock as Vern Acker
- Stephen Young as Lieutenant Andrece
- Kenneth Tobey as Hartman (credited as Ken Tobey)
- Bert Remsen as The Chief
- Jesse Vint as Harmon
- Janis Hansen as Dispatcher
- Nate Esformes as Pela
- Regis Cordic as Judge
- Sidney Clute as Driver
- Jean Byron as Commissioner's (credited as Jeane Bryon)
- Julie Cobb as Sharon
- Claire Brennen as Max, The Waitress
- Nick Dennis as Greek
- Mel Scott as Officer
- Ian Scott as Gunman
- Trish Mahoney as Woman
- Bubby Garion as Staley
- Sally Frei as Girl

== Reception ==
The Los Angeles Times says the subject matter was explored "sincerely but not well" and was hampered by "a vastly overpopulated and needlessly complicated plot." However it said it had a "sturdy, driving thriller structure and excellent telling dialogue" and "Harry Falk has directed with plenty of punch" and Forster gives "perhaps his best performance to date."

== See also ==
- List of American films of 1974
