= Snatched (1973 film) =

1973 film by Sutton Roley

- Genre: Crime; Drama; Thriller
- Teleplay by: Rick Husky
- Story by: Sandra Bruzzese
- Directed by: Sutton Roley
- Starring: Howard Duff; Leslie Nielsen; Sheree North; Barbara Parkins; Robert Reed; John Saxon; Tisha Sterling; Anthony Zerbe
- Music by: Randy Edelman
- Country of origin: United States
- Original language: English

Production
- Executive producers: Aaron Spelling; Leonard Goldberg
- Producer: Tony Thomas
- Cinematography: Leonard J. South
- Editor: Howard Kunin
- Running time: 74 minutes
- Production companies: ABC Circle Films; Spelling-Goldberg Productions

Original release
- Network: ABC
- Release: January 31, 1973

Snatched is a 1973 American made-for-television crime film directed by Sutton Roley and starring Howard Duff, Leslie Nielsen, Sheree North, Barbara Parkins, Robert Reed, John Saxon, Tisha Sterling and Anthony Zerbe. It was broadcast on the anthology film series ABC Movie of the Week.

== Plot ==
Kim, Barbara, and Robin are the wives of three wealthy men. This makes them the target of a gang of kidnappers who demand a $3 million ransom from their husbands. They have just 36 hours to pay up, or else. But this kidnapping has its own complications. For example, one of the wives, Kim, is a diabetic who needs her insulin medication or she will die soon. Moreover, one husband refuses to pay because his much younger wife, Robin, publicly flaunts her sex with other men.

Also, as the viewer discovers midway through the story, there is an unseen mastermind at work behind the caper; surprisingly, he is working in league with one of the kidnap victims. Their plan calls for them to kill the kidnappers and collect the ransom for themselves. From there, they are to take separate flights to Europe, where they will share their new-found wealth.

Their clever ruse nearly succeeds too, if not for the actions of the intrepid husband who volunteers to deliver the ransom. He is almost slain along with the kidnappers, but he successfully feigns death before disposing of the mastermind and recovering the cash. On rescuing the women, however, he learns that Kim, the diabetic, has died. He further discovers that it was his wife who helped plan and carry out the kidnapping.

== Cast ==
- Howard Duff as Duncan Wood
- Leslie Nielsen as Bill Sutter
- Sheree North as Kim Sutter
- Barbara Parkins as Barbara Maxvill
- Robert Reed as Frank McCloy
- John Saxon as Paul Maxvill
- Tisha Sterling as Robin Wood
- Anthony Zerbe as Boone
- Richard Davalos as Whit
- Frank McRae as Cheech
- Bart La Rae as Russell (as Bart LaRae)
- Howard Platt as First Detective
- John Gilgreen as Second Detective

== See also ==
- List of American films of 1973
