= Hijack (1973 film) =

1973 film by Leonard Horn

- Genre: Action; Drama; Thriller
- Teleplay by: Michael Kelly; James D. Buchanan; Ronald Austin
- Story by: Michael Kelly
- Directed by: Leonard Horn
- Starring: David Janssen; Keenan Wynn; Lee Purcell
- Music by: Jack Elliott; Allyn Ferguson
- Country of origin: United States
- Original language: English

Production
- Producers: Leonard Goldberg; Aaron Spelling
- Production location: Los Angeles
- Cinematography: Archie R. Dalzell
- Editor: Leon Carrere
- Running time: 74 minutes
- Production companies: Spelling-Goldberg Productions; 20th Century Fox Television

Original release
- Network: ABC
- Release: September 26, 1973

Hijack is a 1973 American made-for-television action drama thriller film directed by Leonard Horn and starring David Janssen, Keenan Wynn and Lee Purcell.

== Plot ==
Two desperate truck drivers, Jake and Donny, accept an assignment by a man named Kleiner to transport a "super important" cargo for $6,000. The men don't know what's in the cargo, but they find out that another group of men is willing to kill for the haul. Throughout the trip, Jake and Donny are repeatedly attacked by the mercenaries, but the pair always manages to get past them, while also gradually eliminating the crooks one by one. When they finally reach their destination, the enraged Jake breaks the lock on the trailer door and they find out that the trailer is loaded with nothing but burlap sacks filled with sand. Kleiner reveals that the truck had merely been a decoy to cause the mercs to direct their attention to the wrong vehicle; the actual secret cargo had been quietly shipped the night before.

== Cast ==
- David Janssen as Jake Wilkenson
- Keenan Wynn as Donny McDonald
- Lee Purcell as Eileen Noonan
- Jeanette Nolan as Mrs. Briscoe
- William Schallert as Frank Kleiner
- Tom Tully as Mr. Noonan
- Ron Feinberg as Bearded Man (as Ronald Feinberg)
- William Mims Highway Patrol Captain
- John A. Zee as Man With Glasses
- Dallas Mitchell as Houston Dispatcher
- Morris Buchanan as L.A. Dispatcher
- Jim Burk as First Cowboy
- Walter Wyatt as Second Cowboy (as Walt Wyatt)
- James W. Gavin as Helicopter Pilot
- Robert Golden as Weigh Station Officer

== Production ==
It was filmed in the Antelope Valley of California.

== Reception ==
The Los Angeles Times said "if you miss it don't worry about it. You've probably seen it before."

== See also ==
- List of American films of 1973
