= The Girl Who Came Gift-Wrapped =

- Genre: Comedy
- Written by: Susan Silver
- Directed by: Bruce Bilson
- Starring: Karen Valentine; Richard Long; Tom Bosley; Louise Sorel; Farrah Fawcett; Dave Madden
- Music by: Jack Elliott; Allyn Ferguson
- Country of origin: United States
- Original language: English

Production
- Producers: Aaron Spelling; Leonard Goldberg
- Production locations: 20th Century Fox Studios - 10201 Pico Blvd., Century City, Los Angeles, California
- Cinematography: Tim Southcott
- Editor: John Woodcock
- Running time: 74 minutes
- Production company: Spelling-Goldberg Productions

Original release
- Network: ABC
- Release: January 29, 1974

The Girl Who Came Gift-Wrapped is an American made-for-television romantic comedy starring Karen Valentine, Richard Long, Tom Bosley, Farrah Fawcett, Dave Madden, Reta Shaw, and Louise Sorel. Directed by Bruce Bilson and written by Susan Silver, it aired as the ABC Tuesday Movie of the Week on January 29, 1974 and was repeated on January 1, 1975. Talkative, enthusiastic, small-town dreamer Sandy Benson, played by Valentine, is given as a "birthday present" to sophisticated men's magazine publisher Michael Green, portrayed by Long, for the night of his fortieth birthday. Sandy falls in love with and is determined to marry him, but Michael cannot commit himself to one woman, even though he feels that something is missing in his life. The film addresses the social changes precipitated by the contemporary sexual revolution, including promiscuity, cohabitation, and women's liberation, in a light-hearted manner. Ultimately, however, it is a traditional love story that culminates in the marriage of the romantic leads.

== Plot ==
Michael Green (Richard Long) is the publisher of For the Man Who Has Everything, a successful men's magazine similar to Playboy. However, his focus on the publication has come at the expense of his unfinished novel. A wealthy and handsome Hugh Hefner type, he has had many girlfriends, but has not committed to any of them, including his ultracompetent secretary, Sylvia (Louise Sorel). Now, on his fortieth birthday, he is questioning the decisions he has made in both his professional and his personal life because he feels that something is missing.

Michael returns home that night after spending the evening by himself getting drunk. A young woman dressed in a pink bikini and white go-go boots and wrapped in a green bow rings his doorbell. She introduces herself as Sandy Brown (Karen Valentine), his "birthday present" for the night from his colleague Harold (Tom Bosley); it is implied that she is a call girl. In fact, she is Sandy Benson, a 21-year-old recent college graduate from Kenosha, Wisconsin, who majored in archaeology and has moved to Los Angeles after breaking up with her boyfriend to learn about life, embark on a career, and find a husband. Michael offers her something to eat, but she faints of hunger in the kitchen first. After she awakens, she reveals her true identity and says she has never done anything like this before. Talkative, enthusiastic, and determined to pursue her dreams, she and Michael stay up all night conversing without any physical intimacy. The next morning his gruff and disapproving housekeeper Cora (Reta Shaw) finds her in his bed after he has left for the office. Sandy and Michael meet for lunch, and she asks him if he would be her friend and teach her to write. Agreeing, he offers to let her prepare an article for the magazine, and she becomes convinced that he is the man she wants to marry.

A few days later, Sandy tells Michael she is returning to Kenosha because she cannot find a job and has been evicted from her apartment. He invites her to move in with him as a platonic roommate. Much to Cora's irritation, she starts to make herself at home, buying plants for the house and adopting a dog she names Pumpkin. She eventually lands a position as a junior copywriter at an advertising agency. She falls deeper in love with Michael, and he appears to reciprocate, but cannot make a commitment. Later, she and Sylvia devise a plan to convince him to propose, in which she pretends to date other men in order to make him jealous. Meanwhile, he continues to see his latest girlfriend, Patti (Farrah Fawcett), who is upset that Sandy is living with him.

On Sandy's birthday, when her date does not show up, Michael offers to take his place, and they have a wonderful day at the marina and the beach. That evening she confesses that she cancelled the date so that they could be together, and it is implied that they consummate their relationship. The next morning Michael, troubled that he is falling in love, explains to Sandy that he is wrong for her, but she ignores what he says. They start living together as a couple rather than roommates, but the fact that Sandy wants to be married, while Michael does not, creates tension.

A few weeks later a beautiful female employee who has her eyes on Michael brings a memo to him at his house. Coming home from a writing class, Sandy walks in on them as they are having drinks and assumes that something is going on. Michael tells her that nothing happened, but something could have happened if he had not been expecting her. He reiterates that he feels tied down and does not want to be married; he then suggests that they take a break in their relationship. Sandy replies that she is old-fashioned and wants a husband, kids, and a home together—with him. But, she insists: "You don't even know how to say, 'I love you.' … You say, 'love ya.' That's different. That's with a small 'l.' You don't know how to say it with a big 'L,' like in 'I Love You.'" She then storms out with Pumpkin. A couple of days later, Sylvia tells Michael that Sandy is moving back to Kenosha that very day. He follows her in a chartered plane. After a brief conversation in front of her house, he agrees to marry her. She tells him: "Now you’re the man who really has everything."

== Cast ==
- Karen Valentine as Sandy Brown / Sandy Benson
- Richard Long as Michael Green
- Tom Bosley as Harold
- Farrah Fawcett as Patti
- Dave Madden as Stanley
- Reta Shaw as Miss Cora Markin
- Louise Sorel as Sylvia

== Production ==
The ABC Movie of the Week premiered on September 23, 1969. The ABC Tuesday Movie of the Week aired from 1969 to 1975, and the ABC Wednesday Movie of the Week aired from 1972 to 1975. ABC bought the films from various production companies, including Spelling-Goldberg Productions, for $435,000 each in 1974. Most are 90 minutes long, and they range from films that address social issues like rape and alcoholism, to action, suspense, horror, and romantic comedy. Many of these films respond to the contemporary sexual revolution, dealing with themes like women's liberation, promiscuity, prostitution, and divorce. However, when they portray sexual themes, they typically do so in a light-hearted or even exploitative manner. Aaron Spelling directed that references to sex in his projects should be suggestive, not explicit.

In October 1973, it was reported that Valentine would star in an ABC Movie of the Week titled The Man Who Has Everything (later retitled The Girl Who Came Gift-Wrapped) to be produced by Spelling-Goldberg Productions, directed by Bruce Bilson, and written by Susan Silver. Filming was scheduled to begin on October 24 at 20th Century Fox Studios. The other major cast members, including Long, Bosley, and Madden, starred in current or former ABC sitcoms, and Fawcett had appeared in several Spelling-Goldberg projects.

In the early 1970s, Valentine was a popular television actress. She achieved widespread fame as student teacher Alice Johnson in the ABC sitcom Room 222, which premiered in September 1969. During the series, she appeared in three made-for-television films, playing characters more sophisticated than Alice but still innocent. In Gidget Grows Up (1969), she plays the iconic character Gidget, who has an affair with a man much older than she is. In The Daughters of Joshua Cabe (1972), she plays an imprisoned con artist skilled with a gun who is paroled to impersonate one of the daughters of a man trying to save his Wyoming Territory homestead. And in Coffee, Tea or Me? (1973), which aired on September 11, 1973, she plays a flight attendant with two husbands, one in London and the other in Los Angeles.

For Valentine, the role of Sandy constituted what one journalist describes as a "change of image." At the time, she had what another called a "goody-goody reputation": "That voice with the perfect mid-California twang, the cherubic round face, the youthful, perky, not-quite-sexy shape, even a surname synonymous with heart-shaped candies and cupids." Valentine believed that the role offered her the possibility of breaking free of this image. As she told a reporter at the time, "this is the biggest step I've made …. I'm playing the romantic lead. She's a 22-year-old girl having an affair with a man 39. That's very different from little Alice Johnson that I played for five years. I'm very aggressive in this picture. The girl sets out to get the guy and moves right into his house." She later acknowledged, however, that this effort was not entirely successful: "It seems amazing that neither this [Coffee, Tea or Me?] nor 'The Girl Who Came Gift-wrapped' offended anyone, despite some spicy content. Darn it, I guess some of Alice Johnson is in all of the parts I play." In an article trying to make sense of why certain recent television programs incited viewer protests and others did not, another journalist confirms that despite the film's risqué premise, there was not a murmur of protest about it. And in a 1982 profile, Valentine expresses her dismay at never being able to shed her reputation for being cute—a word that she hated.

Just as Valentine's career was rising rapidly during this period, so was scriptwriter Silver's. Women had written television comedies since the 1950s; for example, Gertrude Berg, Madelyn Pugh, Louella MacFarlane, Peggy Chantler Dick, and Treva Silverman, among others, had written for notable sitcoms in the 1950s and 1960s. Nevertheless, the profession was still overwhelmingly male in the early 1970s. Silver was one of the most prominent of the relatively few female television comedy writers of the time, and she has observed that at first she had to deal with producers who were sexist, dismissive, or rude. Initially, she wrote with Iris Rainer, but after striking out her own, she became one of the first writers for The Mary Tyler Moore Show. She also wrote for Room 222, The Partridge Family, Funny Face, and other popular sitcoms. Her first ABC Movie of the Week was The Couple Takes a Wife, which aired on December 5, 1972; it was a ratings and critical success. That same year James L. Brooks, the cocreater and co–executive producer of The Mary Tyler Moore Show, described her as the brightest writer to enter the profession the previous year. His colleague Allan Burns observed that she was in the right place and the right time because she embraced comedy that was based on amusing situations and character nuances rather than one-line jokes.

In her memoir, Silver states that Leonard Goldberg of Spelling-Goldberg Productions gave her the idea for the film. As she developed the script, she drew on aspects of her own life. For example, she was from Milwaukee, Wisconsin; and Sandy was from Kenosha; she moved from her hometown to Los Angeles to become a writer, and so did Sandy. Even certain dialogue, such as the distinction Sandy makes between "love ya" and "I Love You" was inspired by Silver's real experience with her boyfriend Arthur Silver, whom she later married. Her dog was even named Pumpkin, the name that Sandy gave to her adopted pet.

The Girl Who Came Gift-Wrapped was first broadcast on ABC from 8:30 to 10 p.m. on Tuesday, January 29, 1974, as the ABC Tuesday Movie of the Week. Airing opposite Hawaii Five-O and Shaft on CBS and the NBC Tuesday Mystery Movie, which featured an episode of The Snoop Sisters, on NBC, it soundly defeated its competition. It was repeated on Wednesday, January 1, 1975, at 8:30 p.m. The film then aired occasionally on American television through the 1990s, initially distributed by Metromedia Producers Corp., which had acquired the distribution rights to certain Spelling-Goldberg Productions properties in 1973.

== Reception ==
=== Ratings ===
The Girl Who Came Gift-Wrapped received high ratings. For the week ending February 3, 1974, it ranked fifth with a 27.1 rating and 40 share—the second time that season that a made-for-television film starring Valentine received a 40 share or better. It ultimately ranked as the ninth most highly rated made-for-television film and the twentieth most highly rated feature film broadcast on television during the 1973–1974 season.

=== Reviews ===
Reviews of The Girl Who Came Gift-Wrapped were tepid to negative. Critics generally agreed that the film's premise was promising, but that its execution was predictable. In addition, they typically praised Valentine's performance, but expressed annoyance at the fact that her character is so talkative. The entertainment journalist Sue Cameron, a personal friend and supporter of Silver's, wrote the most complimentary review for The Hollywood Reporter. She described the film as "the old 50s myth of a girl setting a trap to 'get her man.' Considering its premise, Susan Silver's writing was as clever as it could be. Taken on surface value it really is a fairy tale story of a girl who captures Prince Charming, but that really doesn't happen to anyone, and certainly not in the 70s." She also praised Valentine's performance as excellent.

Writing for the Los Angeles Times, Kevin Thomas was much more critical: "There's no reason to quibble with writer Susan Silver's premise. It's just that both its development and Miss Valentine's chipmunk-chirrupy character are so irritatingly coy. Bruce Bilson's direction serves only to intensify the film's insufferability." He is especially critical of Valentine: "Batting away her big brown eyes, Miss Valentine quickly becomes tiresome and so does this Spelling/Goldberg production. Long is pleasant, but any sympathy he creates for the publisher's quandary, that of a man becoming aware of his mortality and need to settle down yet resisting giving up his freedom, is demolished by the incessant yakkety-yakking of Miss Valentine."

In a short syndicated review, the Philadelphia Daily News and other newspapers dismissed the film as "a piece of fluff. If you're a Karen Valentine fan then you'll like this tale of a girl who never stops talking and her involvement with Richard Long. He is a men's magazine publisher who is very bored and upset because he has just turned 40 and his dreams no longer are fulfilling. This starts out to make some trenchant comments but they are soon lost in a predictable romance. Louise Sorel is delightful as Long's secretary."

The Windsor Star also found the film disappointing: "It was too bad that cute Karen Valentine wasn't served so well with her telemovie Tuesday …. The idea was appealing. Richard Long was the publisher, and he deserves better too. Susan Silver's screenplay was coy where it should have been sexy and silly when it should have been caustic. Bruce Bilson, who won an Emmy for Get Smart, directed in wishy-washy fashion."

== Home media ==
The Girl Who Came Gift-Wrapped has not been officially released on DVD. It has been included on streaming platforms, such as Amazon Prime Video, and it also appears periodically on YouTube.

== Themes and analysis ==
The Girl Who Came Gift-Wrapped attempts to cleave together a traditional love story culminating in marriage with the "New Morality" of the sexual revolution, a term used in the film itself. The influence of the sexual revolution permeates the script. Michael is a promiscuous single playboy, and Harold hires a call girl for him as a birthday gift. In addition, Sandy describes herself as a young woman who refuses to conform to the conventional life path of women in her hometown. As Silver observed, "as for my consciousness raising, I did try to present some striving to be liberated in the script. Karen's character was partly based on my Midwest innocence, as afraid of the big bad world as I was. My favorite line: 'The whole world's working on a new morality, and in Kenosha, they still refer to Ingrid Bergman as 'that woman.'"

Ultimately, Sandy and Michael begin living together without being married or engaged—a controversial subject for television at the time. As she tells him, "In my hometown, people went together, got pinned, got engaged, and then got married. But we don't fit into a category my mother could cope with—you know, living together." In line with Spelling's directive, however, the sexual dimension of their relationship is implied, and never shown. Furthermore, their status as an unmarried cohabitating couple is only temporary. At the film's end, Sandy reiterates to Michael that she is old-fashioned and wants to be married, and Michael finally says "I love you" and agrees to become her husband. She exemplifies the archetype of the dual liberated woman and old-fashioned girl-next-door pioneered by Mary Richards in The Mary Tyler Moore Show and emulated in subsequent sitcoms and made-for-television films. An unsold sitcom pilot that Silver and actress Jo Ann Pflug created in the 1970s was more radical: It focused on a single woman who wanted to live with, and not marry, her boyfriend, despite the opposition of her family.
