= Beach Patrol (film) =

1979 film by Bob Kelljan

- Genre: Crime; Drama
- Written by: Ronald Austin; James D. Buchanan; Rick Edelstein
- Directed by: Bob Kelljan
- Starring: Robin Strand; Jonathan Frakes; Christie DeLisle
- Music by: Barry De Vorzon
- Country of origin: United States
- Original language: English

Production
- Executive producers: Aaron Spelling; Leonard Goldberg
- Producer: Philip D. Fehrle
- Cinematography: Archie R. Dalzell
- Editor: Jack Harnish
- Running time: 75 minutes
- Production company: Spelling-Goldberg Productions

Original release
- Network: ABC
- Release: April 30, 1979

Beach Patrol is a 1979 American made-for-television crime drama film originally aired on ABC. It stars Robin Strand, Jonathan Frakes, and Christie DeLisle.

The film was a pilot for a television series that did not sell but which still screened as a standalone film.

== Cast ==
- Robin Strand as Russ Patrick
- Jonathan Frakes as Marty Green
- Christine DeLisle as Jan Plummer
- Rick Hill as Earl 'Hack' Hackman
- Michael Gregory as Sgt. Lou Markowski
- Paul Burke as Wes Dobbs
- Michael V. Gazzo as Banker
- Panchito Gómez as Wild boy
- Mimi Maynard as Wanda
- Princess O'Mahoney as Tall girl
- Lillian Adams as Older lady
- Bella Bruck as Older lady
- X Brands as Officer
- Georgie Paul as Nurse
- Susanne Severeid as Surfer girl
