= Wedding Daze (2004 film) =

2004 American television film

- DVD cover
- Written by: Marc Hershon
- Directed by: Georg Stanford Brown
- Starring: John Larroquette; Karen Valentine; French Stewart; Marina Black; Kelly Overton
- Theme music composer: Roger Bellon
- Country of origin: United States
- Original language: English

Production
- Producers: Brian Gordon; Erik Olson
- Cinematography: Dane Peterson
- Editor: Thomas A. Krueger
- Running time: 88 minutes

Original release
- Network: Hallmark Channel
- Release: September 6, 2004

Wedding Daze is a 2004 comedy television film starring John Larroquette, Karen Valentine, Marina Black, Kelly Overton, Jaime Ray Newman, Sebastian Tillinger, James Waterson, Justin Baldoni and French Stewart. It aired on the Hallmark Channel on September 6, 2004.

== Plot ==
Jack and Audrey Landry are a middle-aged couple with three daughters: Nora, Teri, and Dahlia (or Dolly). The eldest, Nora, is a supermodel based in Italy, who rarely comes home. Teri is an independent businesswoman who lives with her boyfriend Bryan. Dahlia, the youngest, lives at home with her parents, and changes her "look" often. Nora's ex-boyfriend Sam works for Jack and is very close to the family.

Their peaceful lives are disrupted when Nora breaks her leg in a car accident in Italy, and has to return home to recover. Teri discovers that Bryan has been cheating on her and promptly moves back in with her parents. For the first time in several years, all three girls are back under the Landrys' roof. Shortly after, Guillermo arrives and introduces himself as Nora's boyfriend. Guillermo explains that he has come to ask Jack and Audrey for Nora's hand in marriage. They agree and Nora accepts Guillermo's proposal. Audrey, Nora, Teri and Dolly quickly consume themselves in wedding plans while an unenthusiastic Jack watches the rising expenses.

Teri finds out that she has lost her job, but a handsome co-worker, Lyle, who has also been laid off, invites her to join a start-up marketing a technology he has developed. They begin to like each other. When Teri receives a bouquet from Bryan begging her to come back, Lyle realizes how he truly feels about Teri and spontaneously asks her to marry him. Teri accepts, and suddenly the Landrys become "a two wedding family." Lyle suggests that both weddings happening on the same day. To Jack's surprise, Nora and Teri agree. The plans, which had already been laid out, are now in upheaval.

If this was not enough, Dolly and Sam realize that they had been falling in love with each other for years and soon decide to get married as well. And so Jack and Audrey get ready to give away all their daughters on the same day. Finally the wedding day arrives and numerous things start to go wrong, starting with the priest going missing, the cakes destroyed and, Jack getting locked on the balcony. Eventually all three get married.

== Cast ==
- John Larroquette as Jack Landry, husband of Audrey Landry with three daughters. Owns a company that works out names for companies
- Karen Valentine as Audrey Landry, wife of Jack Landry with three daughters
- Marina Black: Nora Landry, a model, eldest daughter, set to marry Guillermo Valerio
- Justin Baldoni as Guillermo Valerio, an Italian photographer, set to marry Nora Landry
- Jaime Ray Newman as Teri Landry, middle child of Jack and Audrey Landry, set to marry Lyle Mills
- James Waterston as Lyle Mills, a technological engineer, set to marry Teri Landry
- Kelly Overton as Dahlia Landry, youngest child, set to marry Sam Reilly
- Sebastian Tillinger as Sam Reilly, works with Jack at his company. Set to marry Dahlia Landry

French Stewart, Marc Hershon, Robert Trebor, Bryan Chesters, Jill Jaress, Barry Livingston and Larry Anderson also appear in the film with minor roles.
