= Karen Valentine =

American actress (born 1947)

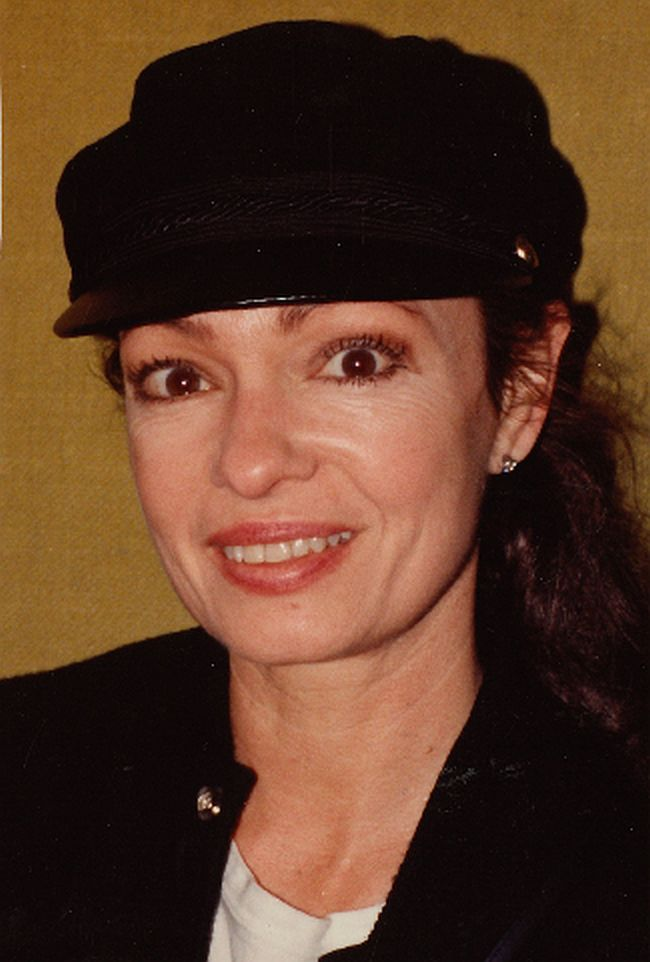
- Valentine in 1995
- Born: Karen Lynne Valentine; May 25, 1947 (age 79); Sebastopol, California, U.S.
- Occupation: Actress
- Years active: 1963–2004
- Known for: Role of Alice Johnson in Room 222; Hot Lead and Cold Feet; The North Avenue Irregulars; Hollywood Squares
- Spouses: Mac McLaughlin (m. 1969–1973) Gary Lewis Verna (m. 1977)
- Awards: Primetime Emmy Award for Outstanding Supporting Actress in a Comedy Series

Karen Valentine (born May 25, 1947) is an American actress. She is best known for her role as young idealistic schoolteacher Alice Johnson in the ABC comedy drama series Room 222 from 1969 to 1974, for which she won the Primetime Emmy Award for Outstanding Supporting Actress in a Comedy Series in 1970, and received a Golden Globe Award nomination in 1971. She later starred in her own short-lived sitcom Karen (1975), and played leading roles in the Disney films Hot Lead and Cold Feet (1978) and The North Avenue Irregulars (1979).

== Early life ==
Valentine was born in Sebastopol, California, on May 25, 1947. She is of Portuguese heritage, and her grandfather changed the family name to Valentin before her birth. She attended Birmingham High School and Analy High School, graduating with the class of 1965. Valentine was crowned 1964 Miss Sonoma County.

== Career ==
Valentine performed "Blame It on the Bossa Nova" on The Ed Sullivan Show on November 10, 1963. This lip-sync performance to Eydie Gormé's hit song was a reprise of her talent performance from the Miss Teenage America pageant.

In 1966–1967, she started her television career as "The Resident Dream Girl" on Chuck Barris's The Dream Girl of 1967, replacing Beverly Adams from the first weekday broadcast opposite hosts Dick Stewart and Wink Martindale, and during that time, she appeared on another Chuck Barris show, The Dating Game.

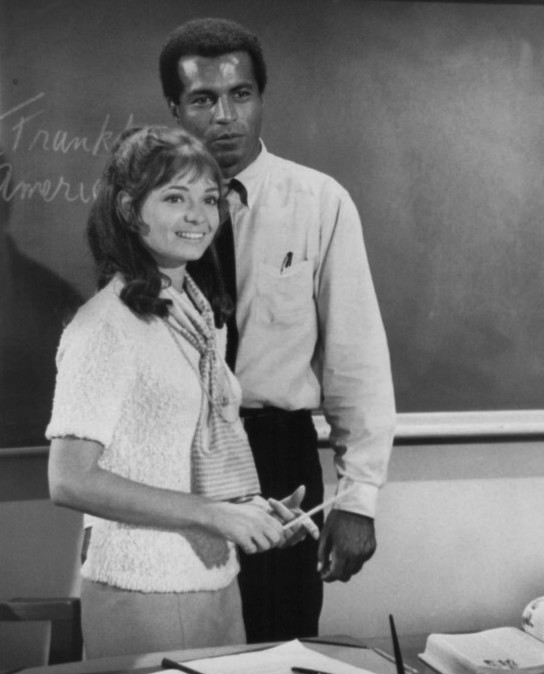
Valentine with Lloyd Haynes in Room 222 (1970)

In 1969, Valentine played Gidget in the 1969 film Gidget Grows Up. In 1969, Valentine won her breakthrough role as Alice Johnson, a student teacher who then becomes a full teacher, on the ABC television series Room 222 with Lloyd Haynes, Denise Nicholas, and Michael Constantine. She was discovered by Gene Reynolds, the director of Room 222, who saw her fumbling in her audition and realized she was funny. She was nominated twice for an Emmy and once for a Golden Globe, winning an Emmy in 1970 for Outstanding Actress in a Supporting Role.

In 1974, an unsold sitcom pilot, The Karen Valentine Program never aired. In 1975, Valentine starred in her own television series, Karen. She played the title role in the critically acclaimed true story Muggable Mary, Street Cop (1982). Valentine appeared in many other movies for television including The Daughters of Joshua Cabe (1972); Coffee, Tea or Me? (1973); The Girl Who Came Gift-Wrapped (1974); Murder at the World Series (1977); Go West, Young Girl (1978); Money on the Side and Skeezer (1982). Valentine was a semi-regular on The Hollywood Squares from 1971 to 1977 on both NBC-TV and in syndication, often trading quips with Paul Lynde. She guest-starred on many series, including Starsky & Hutch; Baretta; Cybill; and Murder, She Wrote; as well as multiple episodes of The Love Boat and Love, American Style. She had a starring role in the 25th episode of the third season of the 1985 revival of The Twilight Zone, entitled "Many, Many Monkeys".

Her feature films include Forever Young, Forever Free (1975); Hot Lead and Cold Feet (1978); The North Avenue Irregulars; (1979) and The Power Within (1995). She also has had many leading roles in made-for-television movies.

Valentine has continued to work in television and on stage. She co-starred with John Larroquette in a 2004 Hallmark Channel TV movie, Wedding Daze. She has starred on stage in many productions, including Romantic Comedy on Broadway and National Tour, Breaking Legs Off-Broadway and National Tour, and the Los Angeles production of Steel Magnolias.

== Filmography ==
=== Film ===
| Year | Film | Role | Notes |
|---|---|---|---|
| 1975 | Forever Young, Forever Free | Carol Anne | Alternate Release Title: e'Lollipop |
| 1978 | Hot Lead and Cold Feet | Jenny | Disney Film |
| 1979 | The North Avenue Irregulars | Jane | Disney Film |
| 1995 | The Power Within | Clyda Dryer | Alternate Release Title: Los Annilos del Poder (Spain); Alternate Release Title: Le Pouvoir de vaincre (France) |

=== Television ===
| Year | Title | Role | Notes |
|---|---|---|---|
| 1966-1967 | Dream Girl of '67 | Self - Hostess | (as The Resident Dream Girl); 170 episodes |
| 1969 | My Friend Tony | | Episode: The Shortest Courtship |
| 1969 | Gidget Grows Up | Gidget Lawrence | ABC Movie of the Week |
| 1970 | 22nd Primetime Emmy Awards | Herself - Winner | TV Special; Emmy Award Winner |
| 1971 | The Bold Ones: The New Doctors | Gayle Ritter | Episode: Tender Predator |
| 1971 | 23rd Primetime Emmy Awards | Herself - Presenter | TV Special |
| 1971 | Rowan & Martin's Laugh-In | Guest Performer | Episode: Karen Valentine |
| 1970-1972 | Love, American Style | Pat Stark / Jane / Alice Graff / Marty Feniman | Episode: (segment "Love and the Coed Dorm"); Episode: (segment "Love and the Elopement"); Episode: (segment "Love and the Four-Sided Triangle"); Episode: (segment "Love and the Scroungers") |
| 1972 | Owen Marshall, Counselor at Law | Donna Cohen | Episode: Murder in the Abstract |
| 1972 | The Daughters of Joshua Cabe | Charity | ABC Movie of the Week |
| 1973 | The Karen Valentine Show | Karen Scott | TV Special |
| 1973 | Coffee, Tea or Me? | Carol Burnham / Carol Byrnes | TV Movie |
| 1969-1974 | Room 222 | Alice Johnson | 113 episodes |
| 1974 | The Girl Who Came Gift-Wrapped | Sandy Brown / Sandy Benson | ABC Movie of the Week |
| 1975 | Karen | Karen Angelo | 13 episodes |
| 1971-1975 | The Mike Douglas Show | Herself | 10 episodes |
| 1975 | Baretta | Holly | Episode: A Bite in the Apple |
| 1976 | The Love Boat | Ellen Carmichael | TV Movie |
| 1976 | Having Babies | Beth Paterno | TV Movie |
| 1977 | McMillan | Sergeant Maureen Rupert | Episode: Dark Sunrise |
| 1970-1977 | The Hollywood Squares | Self - Panelist | 263 episodes |
| 1977 | The Sonny & Cher Show | Guest performer | One episode January 2, 1977 |
| 1977 | Murder at the World Series | Lois Marshall | TV Movie |
| 1975-1977 | Dinah! | Herself | 7 episodes |
| 1977 | Starsky & Hutch | Diana Harmon | Episode: Fatal Charm |
| 1978 | Fantasy Island | Janet Fleming | Episode: Return to Fantasy Island |
| 1978 | The Love Boat | Taffy Martino | Episode: The Eyes of Love / Masquerade / Hollywood Royalty / The Caper S1 E15 |
| 1979 | America 2100 | Dr. Karen Harland | TV Movie |
| 1979 | Eischied | Margaret Manning | Episode: Only the Pretty Girls Die: Part 1 Episode: Only the Pretty Girls Die: Part 2 |
| 1982 | Muggable Mary, Street Cop | Mary Glatzle | TV Movie |
| 1982 | Goodbye Doesn't Mean Forever | Paula McFadden | TV Movie |
| 1982 | Adams House | Chris Bennett | TV Movie |
| 1982 | Skeezer | Carrie Jessup | TV Movie |
| 1982 | Money on the Side | Janice Vernon | TV Movie |
| 1983 | Illusions | Linda Dobbins | TV Movie |
| 1983 | Jane Doe | Victoria Schaffer | TV Movie |
| 1983 | A Girl's Life | Gay Brooks | TV Movie |
| 1984 | Children in the Crossfire | Pam Chandler | TV Movie |
| 1984 | He's Fired, She's Hired | Annabelle Grier | TV Movie |
| 1986 | The Disney Sunday Movie | Meg Taylor | Episode: A Fighting Choice |
| 1987 | The New Mike Hammer | Sister Amelia | Episode: Who Killed Sister Lorna |
| 1987 | Hotel | Rebecca Lloyd | Episode: Hotel Second Thoughts |
| 1988 | She's the Sheriff | Rosalind | Episode: Hair |
| 1988 | Murder, She Wrote | Ellen Cosgrove | Episode: Murder Through the Looking Glass |
| 1988 | Perfect People | Margo | TV Movie |
| 1989 | The Twilight Zone | Claire Hendricks | Episode: Many, Many Monkeys |
| 1990 | Hurricane Sam | Jeanie Kelvin | TV Movie |
| 1990 | Monsters | Victoria | Episode: The Young and the Headless |
| 1991 | CBS Schoolbreak Special | Donna Stern | Episode: The Emancipation of Lizzie Stern |
| 1994 | The Untouchables | Pascualina Petucci | Episode: Til Death Do Us Part |
| 1996 | Cybill | Wanda | Episode: Three Women and a Dummy |
| 2000 | Family Law | Karen Anderson Bell | Episode: Affairs of the State |
| 2004 | Wedding Daze | Audrey Landry | TV Movie |
| 2009 | GSN Live | Self | 2 episodes |
| 2009 | Whatever Happened To? | Self | Episode: Cutie Pies |

== Soundtrack ==
| Year | Production | Notes |
|---|---|---|
| 1975 | Monsanto Night Presents Johnny Mathis in the Canadian Rockies | TV Special performer: "I'm Old-Fashioned", "Put a Little Love in Your Heart", "Buttons and Bows", "Canadian Sunset" and "Banff". |
| 1976 | The Sonny and Cher Show | TV series performer: "The Channel 86 Cutesy News Theme", "TV-themes medley" (uncredited) |

== Theater ==
| Year | Title | Role | Notes |
|---|---|---|---|
| 1980 | Romantic Comedy | Phoebe Craddock | Broadway; September 16, 1980 - October 18, 1980 |
| 1992 | Breaking Legs | Angie | Off-Broadway; September 29, 1992 - October 31, 1992 |

== Awards and nominations ==
| Year | Association | Category | Production | Result |
|---|---|---|---|---|
| 1970 | Emmy Awards | Outstanding Performance by an Actress in a Supporting Role in Comedy | as Alice Johnson in Room 222 | Won |
| 1971 | Emmy Awards | Outstanding Performance by an Actress in a Supporting Role in Comedy | as Alice Johnson in Room 222 | Nominated |
| 1971 | Golden Globe Awards | Best Supporting Actress - Television | Room 222 as Miss Alice Johnson | Nominated |
| 2003 | TV Land Awards | Classic TV Teacher of the Year | Room 222 | Nominated |
