= Death Cruise =

1974 film by Ralph Senensky

- Genre: Mystery
- Written by: Jack B. Sowards
- Directed by: Ralph Senensky
- Starring: Richard Long; Polly Bergen; Edward Albert; Kate Jackson; Celeste Holm; Tom Bosley; Michael Constantine; Cesare Danova
- Music by: Pete Rugolo
- Country of origin: United States
- Original language: English

Production
- Producers: Aaron Spelling; Leonard Goldberg
- Cinematography: Tim Southcott
- Editor: John Woodcock
- Running time: 74 minutes
- Production companies: Spelling-Goldberg Productions; 20th Century Fox Television

Original release
- Network: ABC
- Release: October 30, 1974

Death Cruise is a 1974 American made-for-television mystery film starring Richard Long, Polly Bergen, Edward Albert, Kate Jackson, Celeste Holm, Tom Bosley, Michael Constantine and Cesare Danova. It was directed by Ralph Senensky and aired as the ABC Movie of the Week on October 30, 1974.

== Plot ==
The Carters (Richard Long, Polly Bergen) and two other couples win tickets to a luxury Caribbean cruise. When each of the winners start turning up dead, it soon becomes apparent that the contest was just a trick to begin a killing game. It is up to the ship's doctor, Doctor Burke (Michael Constantine) to figure out what the connection between all these individuals is before more bodies start to turn up.

== Cast ==
- Richard Long as Jerry Carter
- Polly Bergen as Sylvia Carter
- Edward Albert as James Radney
- Kate Jackson as Mary Frances Radney
- Celeste Holm as Elizabeth Mason
- Tom Bosley as David Mason
- Michael Constantine as Dr. Burke
- Cesare Danova as Captain Vettori
- Amzie Strickland as Lynn
- Alain Patrick as Barrere
- Maurice Sherbanee as Room Steward
- Wesley Gale as Hotel Clerk (credited as West Gale)
- Marc De Vries as Deck Steward

== Production ==
Much of the film was shot aboard the RMS Queen Mary in Long Beach, California.

== See also ==
- List of American films of 1974
