= The Bounty Man =

1972 film by John Llewellyn Moxey

- Genre: Western
- Written by: Jim Byrnes
- Directed by: John Llewellyn Moxey
- Starring: Clint Walker; Richard Basehart; John Ericson; Margot Kidder
- Music by: The Orphanage
- Country of origin: United States
- Original language: English

Production
- Producers: Aaron Spelling; Leonard Goldberg
- Cinematography: Ralph Woolsey
- Editor: Art Seid
- Running time: 74 minutes
- Production companies: ABC Circle Films; Spelling-Goldberg Productions

Original release
- Network: ABC
- Release: October 31, 1972

The Bounty Man is a 1972 American made-for-television Western film directed by John Llewellyn Moxey and starring Clint Walker, Richard Basehart, John Ericson and Margot Kidder. It was broadcast as an ABC Movie of the Week.

== Plot ==
A bounty hunter goes after a wanted man but contends with rival bounty hunters who want the reward for themselves, including his old rival.

== Cast ==
- Clint Walker as Kincaid
- Richard Basehart as Angus Keough
- John Ericson as Billy Riddle
- Margot Kidder as Mae
- Gene Evans as Tom Brady
- Arthur Hunnicutt as Sheriff
- Rex Holman as Driskill
- Wayne Sutherlin as Tully
- Paul Harper as Hargus
- Dennis Cross as Rufus
- Vince St. Cyr as Santana
- Glenn R. Wilder as Gault
- Hal Needham as Pike
- Rita Conde as Hargus' Woman
- Robert Swan as 1st Bartender
- Duke Cigrang as 2nd Bartender

== See also ==
- List of American films of 1972
