= Cry Panic =

1974 television film by James Goldstone

- Genre: Mystery; Thriller
- Written by: Jack B. Sowards
- Directed by: James Goldstone
- Starring: John Forsythe; Earl Holliman; Ralph Meeker; Norman Alden; Claudia McNeil; Anne Francis
- Music by: Ken Lauber
- Country of origin: United States
- Original language: English

Production
- Producers: Leonard Goldberg; Aaron Spelling
- Cinematography: Tim Southcott
- Editor: Folmar Blangsted
- Running time: 74 minutes
- Production companies: Spelling-Goldberg Productions; 20th Century Fox Television

Original release
- Network: ABC
- Release: February 6, 1974

Cry Panic is a 1974 American made-for-television mystery film directed by James Goldstone and starring John Forsythe, Earl Holliman, Ralph Meeker, Norman Alden, Claudia McNeil and Anne Francis. It was premiered as the ABC Movie of the Week on February 6, 1974, and was co-produced by Aaron Spelling and Leonard Goldberg.

== Plot ==
A man accidentally runs over and kills a pedestrian outside a small town. He begins to suspect that the locals, including the sheriff, are keeping secrets about the victim.

== Cast ==
- John Forsythe as Dennis Ryder
- Earl Holliman as Sheriff Ross Cabot
- Ralph Meeker as Chuck Braswell
- Norman Alden as Doc Potter
- Claudia McNeil as Ethel Hanson
- Anne Francis as Julie
- Eddie Firestone as Dozier
- Harry Basch as Jackson
- Gene Tyburn as Lipscombe
- Jason Wingreen as Woody
- Royce D. Applegate as Grady (as Royce Applegate)
- Wesley Lau as Joe Red
- Jason Ledger as Stacey
- Pitt Herbert as Mailman

== See also ==
- List of American films of 1974
