= Murder at the World Series =

1977 film by Andrew V. McLaglen

- Genre: Drama; Mystery; Sport
- Written by: Cy Chermak
- Directed by: Andrew V. McLaglen
- Starring: Lynda Day George; Murray Hamilton; Karen Valentine; Michael Parks
- Music by: John Cacavas
- Country of origin: United States
- Original language: English

Production
- Producer: Cy Chermak
- Production locations: Astrodome; Houston, Texas
- Cinematography: Richard C. Glouner
- Editors: Richard A. Harris; John F. Link
- Running time: 100 minutes
- Production company: ABC Circle Films

Original release
- Network: ABC
- Release: March 20, 1977

Murder at the World Series is a 1977 American TV movie starring Lynda Day George, Murray Hamilton, and Karen Valentine and directed by Andrew V. McLaglen.

== Plot ==
A psychopath, once rejected for membership of the Houston Astros, plans revenge by staging a series of kidnappings while the team plays in the World Series against the Oakland A's.

== Cast ==
- Lynda Day George as Margot Mannering
- Murray Hamilton as Harvey Murkison
- Karen Valentine as Lois Marshall
- Gerald S. O'Loughlin as Moe Gold
- Michael Parks as Larry Marshall
- Janet Leigh as Karen Weese
- Hugh O'Brian as The Governor
- Nancy Kelly as Alice Dakso
- Johnny Seven as Detective Severino
- Tamara Dobson as Lisa
- Joseph Wiseman as Sam Druckman
- Bruce Boxleitner as Cisco
- Larry Mahan as Gary Vawn
- Cooper Huckabee as Frank Gresham
- Lisa Hartman as Stewardess
- Maggie Wellman as Kathy
- Cynthia Avila as Jane Torres
- Monica Gayle as Barbara Gresham
- Dick Enberg as Radio Announcer

== See also ==
- List of baseball films
