= Susan Flannery =

American actress (b. 1939)

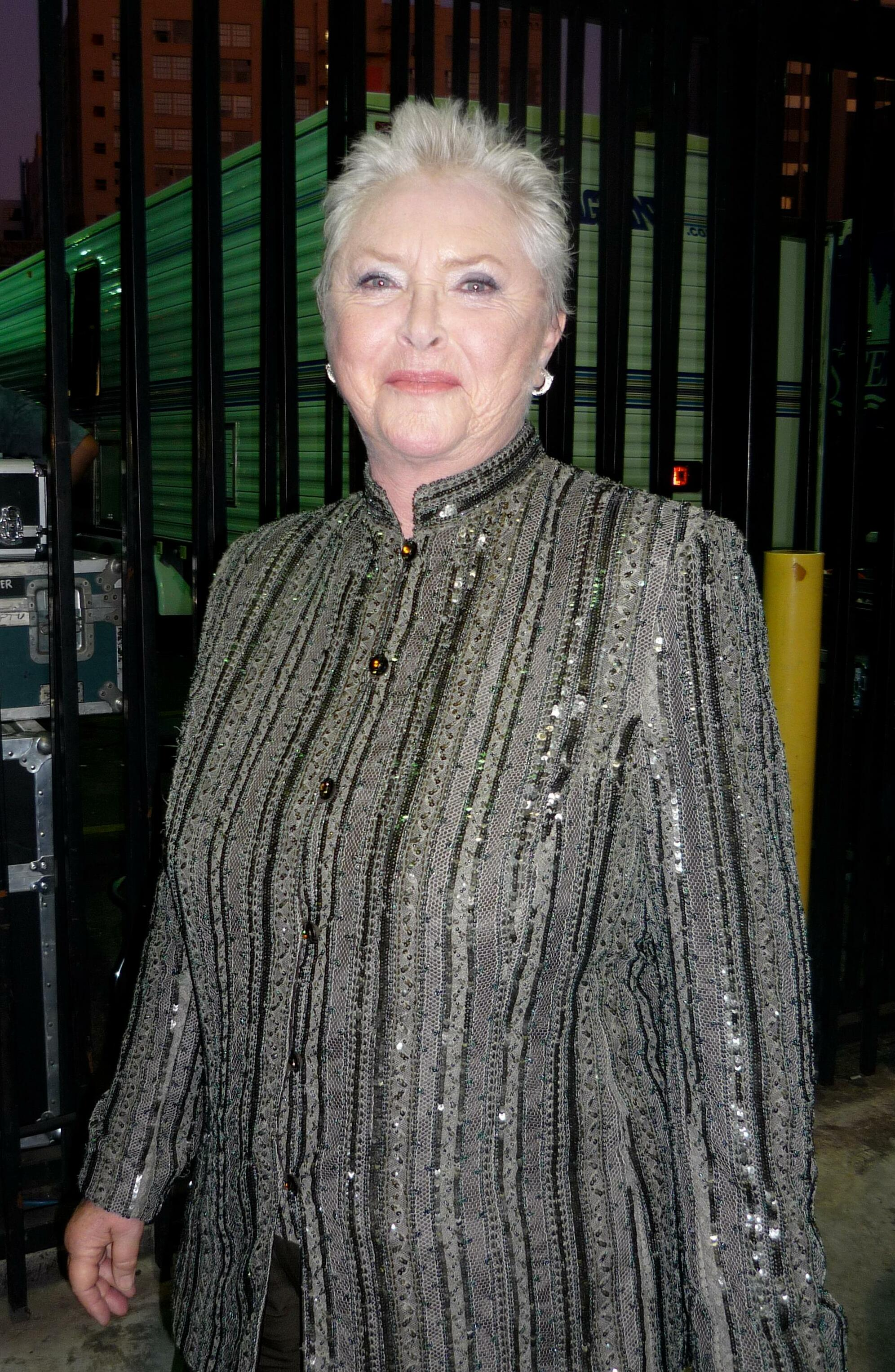
- Flannery at the 39th Daytime Emmy Awards, 2009
- Born: July 31, 1939 (age 87); Jersey City, New Jersey, U.S.
- Education: Stephens College (BA)
- Occupations: Actress, director
- Years active: 1963–2018
- Known for: Laura Horton on Days of Our Lives; Stephanie Forrester on The Bold and the Beautiful
- Children: 1

Susan Flannery (born July 31, 1939) is an American actress and director. She made her screen debut appearing in the 1965 Western film Guns of Diablo and later appeared in some television series. From 1966 to 1975, Flannery starred as Laura Horton on the NBC daytime soap opera, Days of Our Lives for which she received her first Daytime Emmy Award for Outstanding Lead Actress in a Drama Series.

Flannery received Golden Globe Award for New Star of the Year – Actress for her performance in the 1974 disaster film, The Towering Inferno. For her starring role in the 1976 miniseries The Moneychangers, she received Primetime Emmy Award nomination for Outstanding Lead Actress in a Limited Series. Flannery later acted on prime-time shows and made-for-television movies, before returning to daytime with the role of Stephanie Forrester on the CBS soap opera, The Bold and the Beautiful (1987–2012, 2018), receiving three Daytime Emmy Awards for Outstanding Lead Actress in a Drama Series in 2000, 2002 and 2003.

== Early life ==
Flannery was born in Jersey City, New Jersey, on July 31, 1939, and attended high school in Manhattan. She received her BA degree from Stephens College, a women's college in Columbia, Missouri, in 1962.

== Career ==
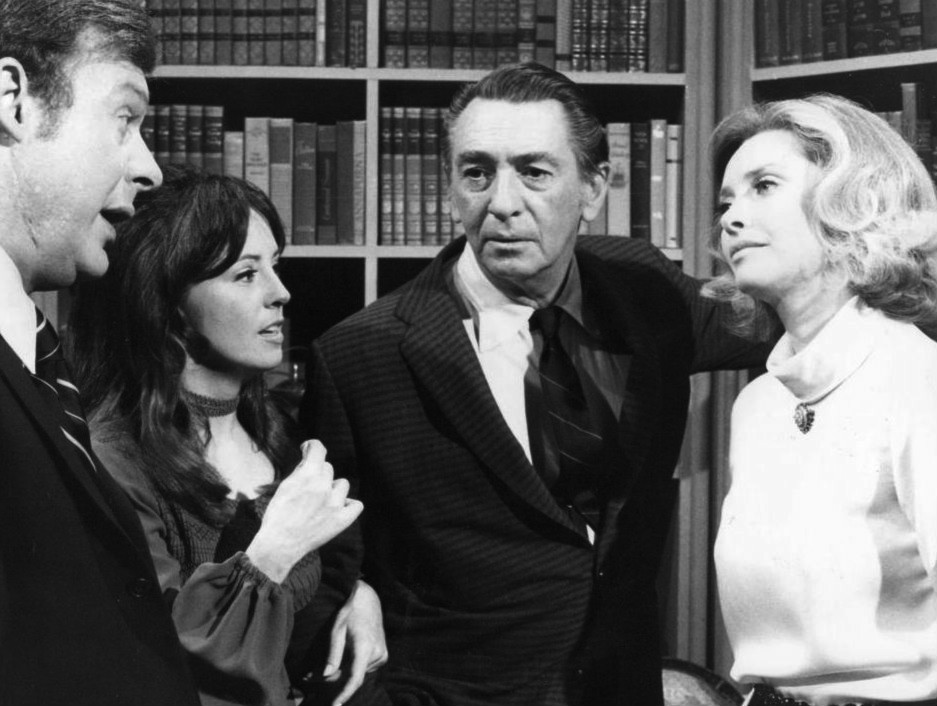
Cast 1971 photo of Days of Our Lives (L-R): Edward Mallory, Denise Alexander, Macdonald Carey and Susan Flannery

Flannery made her television debut appearing in an episode of Burke's Law in 1963. The following year she made her big screen debut playing a supporting role in the Western film Guns of Diablo. She made guest appearances on prime time dramas Slattery's People, Death Valley Days, Ben Casey, The Felony Squad and most notable three-episode act on Voyage to the Bottom of the Sea. In 1966, Flannery was cast as Dr. Laura Spencer Horton on the NBC daytime soap opera, Days of Our Lives, where she met writer William J. Bell (who later cast her in The Bold and the Beautiful in 1987). She played the role until 1975, winning her first Daytime Emmy Award for Outstanding Lead Actress in a Drama Series for her final year on the soap.

In 1974, Flannery starred in the disaster film The Towering Inferno directed by John Guillermin and starring Paul Newman and Steve McQueen. The film received generally positive reviews from critics, and earned around $203.3 million, making it the highest-grossing film of 1974. For her performance, Flannery won Golden Globe Award for New Star of the Year – Actress. The following year, she starred in the comedy film The Gumball Rally. Also that year, Flannery starred alongside Kirk Douglas, Joan Collins and Christopher Plummer in the NBC miniseries, The Moneychangers. For this role, she received Primetime Emmy Award nomination for Outstanding Lead Actress in a Limited Series. She starred in an episode "A Nightmare for a Nightingale" of British anthology series Thriller in 1976 and was lead actress in the 1979 miniseries Women in White based on novel by Frank G. Slaughter. Also in 1979 she played the leading role in the made-for-television romantic drama, Anatomy of a Seduction. In 1981, Flannery joined the cast of CBS prime time soap opera, Dallas, playing Leslie Stewart appearing in 11 episodes during the fourth season. She later appeared in the made-for-television movies Money on the Side (1982) and Shaft of Love (1983).

Flannery became best known worldwide for portraying Stephanie Douglas Forrester on the CBS soap opera The Bold and the Beautiful (1987–2012). She was one of the original cast members of the series, only two of whom still appear (Katherine Kelly Lang and John McCook). She received nine Daytime Emmy Award nominations for Outstanding Lead Actress in a Drama Series, winning in 2000, 2002, and 2003. Flannery was also a regular director on the show and was twice nominated for a Directors Guild of America Award for her work. After 25 years, she decided to leave the show in 2012. In her final storyline, Stephanie Forrester died from lung cancer. Flannery came in at #1 in the Top 50 Soap Actresses of All Time list on published by We Love Soaps TV in 2010. Flannery took an active role in the American Federation of Television and Radio Artists (AFTRA), and advocated for securing cable rights and foreign residuals for actors when their work appears in other media. Her efforts have had a positive impact on how The Bold and the Beautiful actors (and other soap actors) are paid when the show is televised in countries outside the United States.

Flannery appeared in two episodes of ABC's situation comedy Hope & Faith in 2004 with other well-known actors from rival soaps. Flannery also appeared as a special guest on Good News Week. She appeared in a special episode of Wheel of Fortune with Deidre Hall (Marlena, Days of Our Lives) and Peter Bergman (Jack, The Young and the Restless) in 2006. Flannery also directed the October 13, 2008, episode of Guiding Light. From 2010 to 2014 she directed 36 episodes of Venice: The Series and in 2017 directed an episode of The Fosters.

== Personal life ==
Flannery has an adopted daughter, Blaise.

Gay rights activist Rita Mae Brown socialized with Flannery in Los Angeles in the mid-1970s. They met through Fannie Flagg, a comedy writer, actress and game show personality who was their mutual friend. Flagg and Flannery had a close relationship for eight years. Brown wrote the following about Flannery in her 1997 memoir Rita Will:

She'd been a star in a long-running TV program and had left to take a prominent role in a film. Almost white-blonde, with a heart-shaped face, blue eyes, and a great figure, she appeared every inch a woman ready to become a major movie star. She had looks, talent, and drive. What she lacked was the ability to kiss ass. Just when her career should have rocketed, it began to drop to Earth. Approaching forty added to the tension.

She is a fundamentally honest person, a decent one.

Word got about [directors and screenwriters] that she was difficult. That was amended to "difficult dyke." It wasn't too long before she languished in her beautiful shared Montecito, California home wondering what the hell had happened.

Were Susan at the same career fulcrum today [in 1996], she'd have a fifty-fifty chance of swinging up. In the mid-seventies, she had no chance. Today she's back on television [in supporting roles and character parts].

Because she didn't marry to play the game, she might as well have announced that she was gay. Other people announced it for her. She kept silent but stiff-armed any attempts to create a bogus heterosexual life. She and Fannie [Flagg] had been together for eight years. The cracks in their relationship widened under the pressure. Many of Susan and Fannie's friends knew they were lovers, but many didn't. The isolation, under the circumstances, had to have been extremely painful for Susan.

My heart went out to her. After my initial visit [to their Montecito home], the three of us palled around together. The more I knew Susan, the more I liked her.

If there had been a way for the three of us to live together, I would have tried it because I grew to respect Susan and value her for the generous and kind person she is. Like her Irish forebears, she engaged her crisis with good humor and the hope that she'd learn something.

== Filmography ==
Film
| Year | Title | Role | Notes |
|---|---|---|---|
| 1965 | Guns of Diablo | Molly | |
| 1967 | The Gnome-Mobile | Airline Stewardess | Uncredited |
| 1974 | The Towering Inferno | Lorrie | |
| 1976 | The Gumball Rally | Alice | |

Television
| Year | Title | Role | Notes |
|---|---|---|---|
| 1963 | Burke's Law | Lily's Secretary | Episode: "Who Killed Harris Crown?" |
| 1964 | Slattery's People | Nancy Rossman | Episode: "Question: What Are You Doing Out There, Waldo?" |
| 1964 | Voyage to the Bottom of the Sea | Katie/The Sister | 3 episodes |
| 1965 | Death Valley Days | Jenny Hardy | Episode: "Birthright" |
| 1965 | Ben Casey | Elinor Cabot | Episode: "A Nightingale Named Nathan" |
| 1966–75 | Days of Our Lives | Laura Spencer Horton | Contract role |
| 1966 | The Felony Squad | Stewardess | Episode: "The Immaculate Killer" |
| 1966 | The Time Tunnel | Louise Neal | Episode: "The Day the Sky Fell In" |
| 1966 | The Green Hornet | Janet Prescott | Episode: "Trouble for Prince Charming" |
| 1976 | The Moneychangers | Margot Bracken | TV miniseries |
| 1976 | Thriller | Anna Cartell | Episode: "A Nightmare for a Nightingale" |
| 1978 | Anatomy of a Seduction | Maggie Kane | TV movie |
| 1979 | Women in White | Dr. Rebecca Dalton | TV miniseries |
| 1981 | Dallas | Leslie Stewart | Also starring (season 4) |
| 1982 | Money on the Side | Karen Gordon | TV movie |
| 1983 | Shaft of Love | Dr. Rose | TV movie |
| 1987–2012, 2018 | The Bold and the Beautiful | Stephanie Forrester | Starring role |
| 1993 | The Young and the Restless | Stephanie Forrester | 2 episodes |
| 2004 | Hope & Faith | Laura Levisetti | Episodes: "Daytime Emmys: Parts 1 & 2" |

== Awards and nominations ==
List of awards and nominations for Susan Flannery
| Year | Award | Category | Work | Result | Ref. |
|---|---|---|---|---|---|
| 1975 | Golden Globe Awards | New Star of the Year – Actress | The Towering Inferno | Won | |
| 1975 | Daytime Emmy Award | Outstanding Lead Actress in a Drama Series | Days Of Our Lives | Won | |
| 1977 | Primetime Emmy Award | Outstanding Lead Actress in a Limited Series | Arthur Hailey's the Moneychangers | Nominated | |
| 1989 | Soap Opera Digest Award | Outstanding Villainess | The Bold and the Beautiful | Nominated | |
| 1991 | Soap Opera Update — MVP Award | Best Actress | The Bold and the Beautiful | Won | |
| 1991 | Soap Opera Digest Award | Outstanding Villainess | The Bold and the Beautiful | Nominated | |
| 1993 | Soap Opera Digest Award | Outstanding Lead Actress | The Bold and the Beautiful | Nominated | |
| 1994 | Soap Opera Digest Award | Outstanding Lead Actress | The Bold and the Beautiful | Nominated | |
| 1995 | Directors Guild of America Award | Outstanding Directing in Daytime Drama (Episode #2167) | The Bold and the Beautiful | Nominated | |
| 1997 | Directors Guild of America Award | Outstanding Directing in Daytime Drama (Episode #2580) | The Bold and the Beautiful | Nominated | |
| 2000 | Daytime Emmy Award | Outstanding Lead Actress in a Drama Series | The Bold and the Beautiful | Won | |
| 2000 | Soap Opera Digest Award | Outstanding Lead Actress | The Bold and the Beautiful | Nominated | |
| 2001 | Daytime Emmy Award | Outstanding Lead Actress in a Drama Series | The Bold and the Beautiful | Nominated | |
| 2001 | Soap Opera Digest Award | Outstanding Lead Actress | The Bold and the Beautiful | Nominated | |
| 2002 | Daytime Emmy Award | Outstanding Lead Actress in a Drama Series | The Bold and the Beautiful | Won | |
| 2002 | Soap Opera Digest Award | Outstanding Lead Actress | The Bold and the Beautiful | Nominated | |
| 2003 | Daytime Emmy Award | Outstanding Lead Actress in a Drama Series | The Bold and the Beautiful | Won | |
| 2005 | Daytime Emmy Award | Outstanding Lead Actress in a Drama Series | The Bold and the Beautiful | Nominated | |
| 2006 | Daytime Emmy Award | Outstanding Lead Actress in a Drama Series | The Bold and the Beautiful | Nominated | |
| 2009 | Daytime Emmy Award | Outstanding Lead Actress in a Drama Series | The Bold and the Beautiful | Nominated | |
| 2011 | Daytime Emmy Award | Outstanding Lead Actress in a Drama Series | The Bold and the Beautiful | Nominated | |
| 2013 | Daytime Emmy Award | Outstanding Lead Actress in a Drama Series | The Bold and the Beautiful | Nominated | |
