= The North Avenue Irregulars =

1979 film by Bruce Bilson

- Theatrical release poster
- Directed by: Bruce Bilson
- Written by: Don Tait
- Produced by: Ron Miller
- Starring: Edward Herrmann; Barbara Harris; Susan Clark; Karen Valentine; Michael Constantine; Cloris Leachman; Patsy Kelly; Douglas Fowley; Virginia Capers; Ruth Buzzi
- Cinematography: Leonard J. South
- Edited by: Gordon D. Brenner
- Music by: Richard Bowden; Robert F. Brunner
- Production company: Walt Disney Productions
- Distributed by: Buena Vista Distribution
- Release date: February 9, 1979
- Running time: 100 minutes
- Country: United States
- Language: English

The North Avenue Irregulars is a 1979 American comedy crime film produced by Walt Disney Productions, distributed by Buena Vista Distribution Company and starring Edward Herrmann, Barbara Harris, Cloris Leachman, Karen Valentine and Susan Clark. Don Tait wrote the screenplay, which was loosely based on the Rev. Albert Fay Hill's memoir of fighting the mob in New Rochelle, New York in the 1960s. The film was released as Hill's Angels in the United Kingdom.

== Plot ==
Reverend Michael Hill and his two children arrive in New Campton, a fictional town in California. He is there to serve as the new minister at the North Avenue Presbyterian Church. The secretary and music director for the church, Anne, is wary of the changes Hill intends to implement. He wants the congregation to become involved in the church's activities. He asks Mrs. Rose Rafferty to handle the church's sinking fund, which consisted of $1,206 ($5,622 in 2025 dollars). It turns out being an awful mistake, because she has a husband who is a reckless gambler.

On his first Sunday, Reverend Hill learns from Mrs. Rafferty that her husband Delaney bet all the sinking fund money on a horse race. Hill delivers a sermon less than 15 seconds long, then rapidly escorts Mrs. Rafferty out the church as astonished worshipers watch. She leads him to the bookie, hidden behind a dry-cleaning shop owned by Sam the Tailor, and meets Harry the Hat, who recommends that Hill let the bet ride. Hill's horse, Sundae Treat, loses and he is thrown out of the betting parlor. Hill summons the police, but the booking joint has been skillfully removed.

That evening, Reverend Hill delivers a tirade against the organized crime in the city during a local television broadcast. He is chastised by his presbytery superiors for the tirade, and is urged to go out and build church membership in the area. His only success is with a rock band called Strawberry Shortcake, whom he recruits to "jazz up" the music at church. Anne resigns as music director. Then, two treasury agents for the US government arrive: Marvin Fogleman and Tom Voohries. They want Hill to help them close down the gambling racket by recruiting some men from the church to place bets that the agents will watch. Hill cannot find any men to help, but he forms the idea to recruit women. Five women from his congregation attempt to place bets in the company of the Treasury agents, which results in clumsy disaster.

The team changes tactics to try to go after the "bank" that the gangsters use, tailing the mob's deliverymen through town while Hill coordinates using a map at the church office. Two gangsters subsequently appear at the church during services and identify one of the women, Claire Porter. They report that to their crime boss Max Roca who advises them to threaten intimidation.

Anne discovers the operation, even as Reverend Hill defends the Irregulars as keeping the gangsters off balance. Anne resigns from the secretary position, and soon after, the gangsters firebomb the church. Hill is shocked at the gangsters' act, and seems ready to capitulate, but to his surprise, Anne wants to join the fight. Resolved, they continue to hammer the gangsters' movements around town. Meanwhile, Hill receives word that the pulpit has been declared vacant and North Avenue Presbyterian Church will be discontinued as a church entity. Dr. Victor Fulton, a representative from presbytery, arrives to discuss the closure with Hill. Anne picks up two more presbytery representatives at the airport, Dr. Rheems and Reverend Wainwright. However, while bringing them to the church, she recognizes one of the mob's deliverymen and realizes she may be able to find the bank. She tracks the deliveryman to an isolated compound. Within minutes, all the Irregulars besiege the location as the gangsters attempt a frantic escape with their bank. A demolition derby ensues, the crooks are stopped, and the evidence is seized.

The following Sunday, Hill's congregation gathers outside the ravaged church while he delivers news of the indictments against the mob and of the closing of the church. However, Dr. Fulton steps in to proclaim that North Avenue Presbyterian Church will be rebuilt. The youthful band starts the music again as everyone rejoices.

== Cast ==
- Edward Herrmann as Rev. Michael Hill
- Barbara Harris as Mrs. Vickie Sims / Kiddie Car
- Karen Valentine as Jane / June Bride
- Susan Clark as Anne Woods, the Church Secretary / Rookie
- Cloris Leachman as Claire Porter / Phantom Fox
- Douglas Fowley as Mr. Delaney Rafferty / Blarney Stone
- Patsy Kelly as Mrs. Rose Rafferty / Blarney Stone
- Virginia Capers as Cleo Jackson / Clunker
- Herb Voland as Dr. Fulton
- Ivor Francis as Rev. Wainwright
- Ruth Buzzi as Dr. Rheems
- Michael Constantine as Marv Fogleman
- Melora Hardin as Carmel Hill
- Bobby Rolofson as Dean Hill
- Dena Dietrich as Mrs. Carlisle
- Dick Fuchs as Howard Carlisle
- Steve Franken as Tom Voories
- Cliff Osmond as Big Chin
- Carl Ballantine as Sam the Tailor
- Alan Hale, Jr. as Harry the Hat
- Frank Campanella as Max Roca

== Production ==
In 1969, Walt Disney Productions purchased the rights to the 1968 novel The North Avenue Irregulars: A Suburb Battles the Mafia by Reverend Albert Fay Hill. Screenwriter Don Tait adapted the story in 1977. The film was shot at Disney Studios in Burbank, California and at 42 locations in the Los Angeles area, including neighborhoods within Burbank, Long Beach, Pasadena and Newhall. Fourteen new automobiles costing $155,000 were destroyed for the climactic demolition sequence.
