= Only with Married Men =

1974 film by Jerry Paris

- Genre: Comedy
- Written by: Jerry Davis
- Directed by: Jerry Paris
- Starring: David Birney; Michele Lee
- Music by: Jack Elliott; Allyn Ferguson
- Country of origin: United States
- Original language: English

Production
- Executive producers: Aaron Spelling; Leonard Goldberg
- Producer: Jerry Davis
- Cinematography: Tim Southcott
- Editor: John Woodcock
- Running time: 74 minutes
- Production company: Spelling-Goldberg Productions

Original release
- Network: ABC
- Release: December 4, 1974

Only with Married Men is a 1974 American made-for-television comedy film directed by Jerry Paris.

== Plot ==
A woman decides to only date married men. A man falls in love with her and pretends to be married to woo her.

== Cast ==
- David Birney as Dave Andrews
- Michele Lee as Jill Garrett
- John Astin as Dr Harvey Osterman
- Judy Carne as Marge West
- Dom DeLuise as Murray West
- Gavin MacLeod as Jordan Robbins
- Dan Tobin as Alan Tolan
- Simone Griffeth as Tina
- Yolanda Galardo as Sheila Osterman

== Reception ==
The Los Angeles Times called it "witless".
