= Will Seltzer =

American actor

Will Seltzer is an American actor who had supporting roles in films such as Baby Blue Marine (1976), Citizen's Band (1977), The Chicken Chronicles (1977), The One and Only (1978), More American Graffiti (1979), Johnny Dangerously (1984), The Allnighter (1987) and The Wizard (1989). In addition, he made a guest appearance for several episodes as Davey Jessup on the Mary Hartman, Mary Hartman show. He also appeared in the miniseries Once an Eagle (1976), an episode of Barney Miller in 1977 and again in 1982.

Seltzer also auditioned for the part of Luke Skywalker in Star Wars, and, according to Fred Roos, he was George Lucas's second choice for the role behind Mark Hamill.

He currently resides in West Coxsackie, New York with his wife and two children.
