= The Oath (1976 TV series) =

American anthology TV series

The Oath is an American TV anthology series. It consisted of two films, 33 Hours in the Life of God and Sad and Lonely Sundays. The series did not proceed but the two episodes aired as stand alone movies.

== 33 Hours in the Life of God ==
33 Hours in the Life of God is a 1976 American TV movie. It was directed by Glenn Jordan.

It screened alongside Sad and Lonely Sundays.

=== Plot ===
33 hours in the life of a top surgeon.

=== Cast ===
- Hal Holbrook as Dr Simon Abbott
- Carol Rossen as Alison Abbott
- Hume Cronyn as Dr Paul Jaffe
- Louise Latham as Nurse Levitt

=== Reception ===
The Los Angeles Times called it "old fashioned and predictable".

== The Sad and Lonely Sundays ==
The Sad and Lonely Sundays is a 1976 American TV movie. It was a sequel to 33 Hours in the Life of God and was based on a script by Rod Serling.

=== Cast ===
- Jack Albertson as Dr George Sorenson
- Will Geer as Lucas Wembly
- Ed Flanders as Dr Frankman
- Eddie Firestone as Dr Bainbridge
- Doreen Lang as Hester
- Dorothy Tristan as Gloria Evans
- Jeff Corey as Dean Miller
- Dori Brenner as Sandy
- Bert Remsen as Mort Cooper
