= The Daughters of Joshua Cabe =

1972 film by Philip Leacock

- Genre: Western
- Written by: Paul Savage
- Directed by: Philip Leacock
- Starring: Buddy Ebsen
- Music by: Jeff Alexander
- Country of origin: United States
- Original language: English

Production
- Executive producers: Aaron Spelling; Leonard Goldberg
- Producer: Richard E. Lyons
- Cinematography: Archie R. Dalzell (as Arch Dalzell)
- Editor: Art Seid
- Running time: 74 minutes
- Production company: Spelling-Goldberg Productions

Original release
- Network: ABC
- Release: September 13, 1972

The Daughters of Joshua Cabe is an American made-for-television comedy western that premiered on the ABC Wednesday Movie of the Week on September 13, 1972. It was directed by Philip Leacock and written by Paul Savage. Joshua Cabe (Buddy Ebsen) is an aging fur trapper who lives in a remote valley in Wyoming Territory. After his wife died 20 years ago, he sent his three young daughters to live with his sister in St. Louis and has not seen them since. Now, in 1887, to keep his land under a new homesteading law, he recruits Mae (Lesley Ann Warren), a prostitute, Charity (Karen Valentine), a con artist, and Ada (Sandra Dee), a pickpocket, to pose as his daughters and file a land claim with him. By defending Joshua against his rival Amos Wetheral (Leif Erickson), the three city women help Joshua save his land and find the fresh start in life they were looking for.

== Plot ==
Joshua Cabe (Buddy Ebsen) is an aging fur trapper living in a remote valley in Wyoming Territory, a four-hour wagon ride from the town of Colton. Twenty years ago, in 1867, his city-born wife, Martha, passed away at age 25—a victim of the harsh frontier life; Josh still feels responsible for her death. Before she died, he built a comfortable cabin for her and their three young daughters and promised he would never leave the land, where she is now buried. He then sent their daughters to St. Louis to be raised by his sister, Lavinia. He has not seen them since, and his last letter from them arrived several years ago. Unable to bring himself to live in the cabin, he shares a dark and dilapidated soddy (sod house) with Uncle Bitterroot (Jack Elam).

On his birthday, Josh rides into town with Bitterroot to get supplies and see if has received any letters from his daughters. Bitterroot tells him that Amos Wetheral (Leif Erickson) and his four sons—Blue (Don Stroud), Cole (Michael Anderson Jr.), Deke (Paul Koslo), and Billy Jack (William Katt)—are in town. Amos wants Josh's land, and his sons burned down Josh's barn in an effort to drive him off of it. At Collier's Trading Post, the storekeeper, Codge (Henry Jones), tells Josh that he has no letters. Amos's sons come in and threaten Josh. Then Amos himself arrives and informs Josh that a new homestead law has been enacted. Under the law, old-timers like themselves are entitled to file claims on two sections of land, plus two more for each of their kin. The filing deadline is in only four weeks, and claimants must reside on their land for at least one year. Amos intends to file claims on Josh's land. Concerned that the Wetherals could come to possess the entire valley, Josh resolves to travel to St. Louis to bring back his daughters so that they can file a claim with him.

In St. Louis, Josh traces his daughter Katie to Saint James Hospital, run by the Sisters of Charity. While there, he learns that Katie has become a nun, now known as Sister Mary Robert. Katie tells him that his other two daughters have married and moved to New York. Realizing that they are no longer his, he decides not to tell her the true reason for his visit. He then goes to a saloon. At the next table, a "soiled dove" (prostitute) named Mae (Lesley Ann Warren) is assaulted by her pimp, and Josh comes to her aid. She discreetly offers him sexual favors in return, but to her surprise, he declines. Instead, he conceives an audacious plan to save his land. He proposes to rescue Mae and two other women in precarious situations by bringing them to Wyoming Territory for a fresh start as his "daughters." In addition to helping the women, this plan will enable him to file a claim covering the entire valley. Mae agrees. With the help of the Mother Superior at Sister Mary Robert's convent, Josh recruits two more "scrubs". Charity (Karen Valentine) is a con artist in Glenville Women's Prison who is eligible for parole, and Ada (Sandra Dee) is a pickpocket whom Josh saves from arrest in a dress shop. At the last minute, Mae, coerced by her pimp, almost backs out. The pimp threatens Josh, Charity, and Ada with a knife, and after they frighten him away, she decides to join them. At the train station, Josh's three new daughters begin bickering like real sisters.

The group makes the arduous journey to Wyoming Territory by train, stagecoach, and wagon. After they arrive in Colton, Bitterroot meets them, and they stop at the trading post to buy supplies. Because he has no money, Josh asks Codge to put the bill on his tab as usual, but Amos has pressured Codge to refuse his request. Ada, however, pickpockets Amos and pays the bill with his money. Josh, Bitterroot, and the three daughters then proceed to the valley. They arrive to the sight of the soddy in ruins: Amos's sons have destroyed it. Although Josh had kept the cabin empty in Martha's memory, he proposes that the new household move into it. The women make it habitable and then undertake a host of other chores, the most ambitious of which is building a dam over a stream to control the spring floods. Touched by their dedication, Josh proposes to leave the land to them after he dies, even though they have not expressed any interest in staying there permanently, which Charity notes.

As Josh and his daughters are finishing construction of the dam, Amos's sons trigger a stampede. The rampaging cattle destroy the structure and almost trample Josh and Charity to death. The near-tragedy makes Josh realize that he has exposed his daughters to unacceptable risk. He tells them that he is taking them back to St. Louis even though they want to stay because, as Charity says, this land is worth fighting for. They ride to town, where the daughters will stay in a hotel for a couple of days before the stagecoach departs. At the trading post, Blue and Deke intercept a letter to Josh from Sister Mary Robert and learn that Mae, Charity, and Ada are not really his daughters. Blue implies to Mae that her intimacy could buy his discretion regarding Josh's secret, sparing Josh from public ruin. Charity and Ada see Blue take Mae to a nearby livery stable and become suspicious. In the stable, Blue begins to seduce Mae, but Mae grabs his gun. Then Bitterroot and Ada burst in, and Bitterroot and Blue begin fighting. Deke arrives and points his gun at Bitterroot. Before he can fire, Josh and Charity enter, and Josh shoots Deke, injuring him.

Shortly thereafter, Cole tells Josh and Bitterroot that Amos wants them to meet on the main street of town in five minutes to settle their conflicts. Amos secretly orders Blue to lie in wait; even though Blue wants to defuse the situation rather than fight, he complies. Meanwhile, Josh orders his daughters to take shelter in the trading post. Charity, however, insists that the three women must help Josh and Bitterroot. Without Josh's knowledge, they borrow guns from the trading post and then position themselves like snipers. Just before the showdown begins, Charity spots Blue training his pistol on Josh and Bitterroot. She shoots him with her pistol, and then Ada fires her rifle at Amos, Cole, and Billy Jack. Mae follows suit with her rifle. Together, the three women disable, but do not kill, all of the Wetheral men except for Billy Jack. Charity then accosts Amos and proclaims, "I say nobody takes our land from us," implying that the three women intend to stay, and demands, "What do you say?" The scene switches to a shot of Josh, Bitterroot, Mae, Charity, and Ada leaving the land office with their deed to the land, finally giving them legal title to the valley. They then return home, the three daughters bickering as usual.

== Cast ==
- Buddy Ebsen as Joshua Cabe
- Karen Valentine as Charity
- Lesley Anne Warren as Mae (as Lesley Warren)
- Sandra Dee as Ada
- Don Stroud as Blue Wetheral
- Henry Jones as Codge Collier
- Jack Elam as Bitterroot
- Leif Erickson as Amos Wetheral
- Michael Anderson Jr. as Cole Wetheral
- Paul Koslo as Deke Wetheral
- Julie Mannix as Sister Mary Robert
- Ron Soble as Arnie
- William Katt as Billy Jack (as Bill Katt)
- Claudia Bryar as Warden Tippet
- Eve McVeagh as Mother Superior
- Erin O'Brien-Moore as Matron
- Jon Locke as Plainclothesman
- Sharon Douglas as Saleslady
- Doodles Weaver as Telegraphman

== Production ==
Originally airing on ABC on Wednesday, September 13, 1972, The Daughters of Joshua Cabe is the inaugural episode of the ABC Wednesday Movie of the Week. The ABC Movie of the Week premiered on September 23, 1969. The Tuesday edition aired from 1969 to 1975, and the Wednesday edition aired from 1972 to 1975. ABC bought the films from various production companies, including Spelling-Goldberg Productions, formed by producers Aaron Spelling and Leonard Goldberg. Most are 90 minutes long, and they range from films that address social issues like rape and alcoholism, to westerns, action, suspense, horror, and romantic comedy. In addition to The Daughters of Joshua Cabe, the westerns include The Over-the-Hill Gang (1969), The Over-the-Hill Gang Rides Again (1970), Alias Smith and Jones (1971), The Trackers (1971), Kung Fu (1972), and Pioneer Woman (1973), among many others.

Like other movies of the week, The Daughters of Joshua Cabe was produced as a pilot. Although it was not developed into a series, two sequels with entirely new casts were produced: The Daughters of Joshua Cabe Return, which aired on January 28, 1975, and The New Daughters of Joshua Cabe, which aired on May 29, 1976. Paul Savage, who wrote the script, had written many westerns and won a Writers Guild of America award for his work on Gunsmoke, on which he had served as executive story consultant. Some of the sets were repurposed from the 1969 film Hello, Dolly!, with turn-of-the century New York being transformed into late-nineteenth-century St. Louis; in addition, the costumes and hairstyles worn by the three female leads were based on styles seen in catalogues published by St. Louis stores during the latter era.

The cast features a mix of veterans and newcomers. In March 1972, Spelling stated that the film would star Walter Brennan as Joshua Cabe, although it is unclear whether he was being serious. In May it was announced that Ebsen — who had recently concluded his long run as Jed Clampett on The Beverly Hillbillies, which was cancelled in spring 1971 — had been signed for the role. Erickson and Elam were familiar faces from classic westerns. Dee had been a popular star in the late 1950s and early 1960s, but as her film career faded, she was motivated to explore television. She told a reporter: "I cried when it was over …. We had a ball. It was unusual for three girls to get along as well as we did. All three of us ended on a perfect note of friendship." Valentine was an up-and-coming actress appearing as student teacher Alice Johnson in ABC's hit sitcom Room 222, for which she won an Emmy Award. Lesley Ann Warren was a young actress and singer who was a regular on Mission Impossible during the 1971–1972 season and had guest starred in several other series.

The premiere of The Daughters of Joshua Cabe aired opposite the NBC Mystery Movie, which that night featured the first episode of the mystery series Banacek starring George Peppard, on NBC and the season opener of The Carol Burnett Show and the first half of Medical Center on CBS. In 1977, Time-Life TV acquired first-run domestic syndication rights to the film and to other made-for-television films from ABC.

== Reception ==
=== Ratings ===
The Daughters of Joshua Cabe received high ratings. For the week ending September 17, 1972, it was the fifth most highly rated program of the week. For the 1972–1973 season, it was the 11th most highly rated made-for-television film (25.0 rating; 38 share). It was also the 27th most highly rated feature film.

=== Reviews ===
The Daughters of Joshua Cabe received mixed reviews. One of the most extensive and positive ones was published in Variety: "A slick, old-fashioned western with a neat women's angle, 'Daughters of Joshua Cabe' was a well-paced and stylishly directed pseudo-movie that managed to be diverting for the 90-minute course. It won't win any prizes, but it was sturdy and expertly crafted video fare." The cast was also praised: "Able performances by the gals, Karen Valentine, Sandra Dee and Lesley Warren, helped to make it work. Ebsen was perfect casting as Cabe, but it was Jack Elam as his pal and sidekick who brought a human dimension to the cardboard characterizations and won the acting honors."

The Los Angeles Times was more negative. While it declared that the film's "prime virtue" is "the amiable pairing of those two old pros Buddy Ebsen and Jack Elam", it did not mention the performances of the three female leads. Moreover, it described the film as "aw-shucks hokum, badly contrived and broadly but capably played by Ebsen and Elam. It's a pity that this highly synthetic comedy-drama doesn't at least allow Stroud and Koslo a chance to be more than stock meanies, for they are among the most gifted young actors in Hollywood today."

Similarly, the Boston Globe derided the film as "a painless, lethargic trifle." It continues: "There was supposed to be comedic overtones to this broad tale but it just failed to generate the kind of life and spirit it was supposed to arouse. Perhaps the girls were at fault, Lesley Warren, Sandra Dee and Karen Valentine, because Buddy Ebsen did a competent job as the determined widower and Jack Elam was simply grand as his faithful sidekick. This was just a middling entry for the new midweek movie and may make it hard for that film slot to get a foothold."

== Home media ==
The Daughters of Joshua Cabe was released on DVD by KL Studio Classics (Kino Lorber Studio Classics) in 2019.

== Themes and analysis ==
The Daughters of Joshua Cabe is set in Wyoming Territory and St. Louis in the late 1880s. The homestead law referenced in the film, by which homesteaders are entitled to file claims on two sections of land, plus two more for each of their relatives, is not historically accurate. The most important homesteading law under which individuals established title to public land in the territory was the federal Homestead Act of 1862, which went into effect on January 1, 1863. This law authorized individuals to file a claim to a quarter section of federal public land (160 acres). A claimant had to be the head of a family, a person over age 21, or a person who had satisfied a specified military service requirement. Free and clear title to the land was granted after the claimant had resided on it for five years and made improvements on it. The Homestead Act played an important role in the settlement of the West by U.S. citizens and the establishment of homesteads, farms, ranches, and eventually communities.

In the 1870s, cattle ranchers in the territory relied almost solely on the free use of public land, and by June 30, 1880, only one-seventh of land in the territory had been surveyed. According to records of the General Land Office, there were less than 400 filings made on public lands in the territory in the 1870s, but almost 11,000 in the 1880s as land acquisition practices changed dramatically. Nevertheless, as the film implies, life in Wyoming was difficult. As one scholar stated, "It was indubitably a hard life in Wyoming—'hell on women and horses' and death on cattle."

The Daughters of Joshua Cabe is a comedy western, a subgenre that had existed since the silent film era. In the 1960s, a host of comedy westerns, such as The Ballad of Josie (1967) and Support Your Local Sheriff! (1969), was released. This subgenre proved to be successful on the ABC Movie of the Week. In fact, the first film that Spelling made for the series was a comedy western titled The Over-the-Hill Gang, which was so popular that it spawned a sequel. The Daughters of Joshua Cabe exemplifies a type of comedy western in which the comedy stems largely from the "fish-out-of-water" concept, in which individuals unfamiliar with the social conditions of the West are transplanted onto the rugged frontier with humorous results. It's also an early example of a trend in 1970s television in which women characters, usually portrayed by attractive actresses, became action heroines—a trend reflected in series such as Police Woman, The Bionic Woman, and Charlie's Angels, which was produced by Spelling-Goldberg Productions.

== See also ==
- List of American films of 1972
