= List of television films produced for American Broadcasting Company =

This is a list of television films produced for American Broadcasting Company (ABC). Many of these films were made as television pilots, four of them were United Nations television film series.

== 1950s ==
- Portrait of Gina (1958)
- Girl on the Run (October 10, 1958)

== 1960s ==
Title	Premiere date
Carol for Another Christmas	December 28, 1964
Who Has Seen the Wind?	February 19, 1965
Once Upon a Tractor	September 9, 1965
Hercules and the Princess of Troy	September 12, 1965
The Wild Weird World of Dr. Goldfoot	November 18, 1965
The Dangerous Christmas of Red Riding Hood	November 28, 1965
Scalplock	April 10, 1966
The Poppy Is Also a Flower	April 22, 1966
The Cliff Dwellers	August 28, 1966
Noon Wine	November 23, 1966
The Dangerous Days of Kiowa Jones	December 25, 1966
Return of the Gunfighter	January 29, 1967
Carousel	May 7, 1967
Dial M for Murder	November 15, 1967
The Strange Case of Dr. Jekyll and Mr. Hyde	January 7, 1968
A Hatful of Rain	March 3, 1968
Kiss Me Kate	March 23, 1968
Shadow on the Land	December 4, 1968
Marcus Welby, M.D.	March 23, 1969
Arsenic and Old Lace	April 7, 1969
Seven in Darkness	September 23, 1969
The Immortal	September 30, 1969
The Over-the-Hill Gang	October 7, 1969
Wake Me When the War Is Over	October 14, 1969
The Monk	October 21, 1969
The Young Lawyers	October 28, 1969
The Pigeon	November 4, 1969
The Spy Killer	November 11, 1969
The Ballad of Andy Crocker	November 18, 1969
In Name Only	November 25, 1969
Three's a Crowd	December 2, 1969
Daughter of the Mind	December 9, 1969
The Silent Gun	December 16, 1969
Honeymoon with a Stranger	December 23, 1969
Gidget Grows Up	December 30, 1969

== 1970s ==
=== 1970 ===
Title	Premiere date
Black Water Gold	January 6, 1970
House on Greenapple Road	January 11, 1970
Foreign Exchange	January 13, 1970
Carter's Army	January 27, 1970
Along Came a Spider	February 3, 1970
The Challenge	February 10, 1970
The Journey of Robert F. Kennedy	February 17, 1970
Quarantined	February 24, 1970
Mister Jerico	March 3, 1970
Dial Hot Line	March 8, 1970
The Love War	March 10, 1970
The Young Country	March 17, 1970
How Awful About Allan	September 22, 1970
Night Slaves	September 29, 1970
But I Don't Want to Get Married!	October 6, 1970
The Old Man Who Cried Wolf	October 13, 1970
Wild Women	October 20, 1970
The House That Would Not Die	October 27, 1970
Tribes	November 10, 1970
The Over-the-Hill Gang Rides Again	November 17, 1970
Crowhaven Farm	November 24, 1970
Run, Simon, Run	December 1, 1970
Weekend of Terror	December 8, 1970
The Man Who Wanted to Live Forever	December 15, 1970

=== 1971 ===
Title	Premiere date
Alias Smith and Jones	January 5, 1971
Assault on the Wayne	January 12, 1971
Dr. Cook's Garden	January 19, 1971
The Feminist and the Fuzz	January 26, 1971
The Point!	February 2, 1971
Love Hate Love	February 9, 1971
Maybe I'll Come Home in the Spring	February 16, 1971
Longstreet	February 23, 1971
Incident in San Francisco	February 28, 1971
Yuma	March 2, 1971
River of Gold	March 9, 1971
In Search of America	March 23, 1971
Cannon	March 26, 1971
The Sheriff	March 30, 1971
Escape	April 6, 1971
The City	May 17, 1971
Owen Marshall, Counselor at Law	September 12, 1971
The Forgotten Man	September 14, 1971
The Birdmen	September 18, 1971
Congratulations, It's a Boy!	September 21, 1971
The Deadly Dream	September 23, 1971
Five Desperate Women	September 28, 1971
Sweet, Sweet Rachel	October 2, 1971
The Last Child	October 5, 1971
Thief	October 9, 1971
A Taste of Evil	October 12, 1971
In Broad Daylight	October 16, 1971
Suddenly Single	October 19, 1971
Death Takes a Holiday	October 23, 1971
The Death of Me Yet	October 26, 1971
A Little Game	October 30, 1971
Two on a Bench	November 2, 1971
Revenge!	November 6, 1971
Do Not Fold, Spindle or Mutilate	November 9, 1971
Duel	November 13, 1971
Mr. and Mrs. Bo Jo Jones	November 16, 1971
The Reluctant Heroes	November 23, 1971
The Failing of Raymond	November 27, 1971
Earth II	November 28, 1971
Brian's Song	November 30, 1971
The Devil and Miss Sarah	December 4, 1971
If Tomorrow Comes	December 7, 1971
See the Man Run	December 11, 1971
The Trackers	December 14, 1971
What's a Nice Girl Like You...?	December 18, 1971

=== 1972 ===
Title	Premiere date
Gidget Gets Married	January 4, 1972
The Astronaut	January 8, 1972
The Bravos	January 9, 1972
The Night Stalker	January 11, 1972
Madame Sin	January 15, 1972
Getting Away from It All	January 18, 1972
The People	January 22, 1972
Women in Chains	January 25, 1972
The Screaming Woman	January 29, 1972
Hardcase	February 1, 1972
When Michael Calls	February 5, 1972
Second Chance	February 8, 1972
The Hound of the Baskervilles	February 9, 1972
Call Her Mom	February 15, 1972
Adventures of Nick Carter	February 20, 1972
Kung Fu	February 22, 1972
Two for the Money	February 26, 1972
The Eyes of Charles Sand	February 29, 1972
A Very Missing Person	March 4, 1972
Fireball Forward	March 5, 1972
The Delphi Bureau: The Merchant of Death Assignment	March 6, 1972
The Rookies	March 7, 1972
Jigsaw: Man on the Move	March 26, 1972
The New Healers	March 27, 1972
Assignment: Munich	April 30, 1972
The Brady Kids on Mysterious Island	September 9, 1972
The Longest Night	September 12, 1972
The Daughters of Joshua Cabe	September 13, 1972
Yogi's Ark Lark	September 16, 1972
The Streets of San Francisco	September 16, 1972
No Place to Run	September 19, 1972
Haunts of the Very Rich	September 20, 1972
Mad, Mad, Mad Monsters	September 23, 1972
Moon of the Wolf	September 26, 1972
Say Goodbye, Maggie Cole	September 27, 1972
Nanny and the Professor	September 30, 1972
Playmates	October 3, 1972
Rolling Man	October 4, 1972
Popeye Meets the Man Who Hated Laughter	October 7, 1972
Night of Terror	October 10, 1972
Lieutenant Schuster's Wife	October 11, 1972
Willie Mays and the Say-Hey Kid	October 14, 1972
Goodnight, My Love	October 17, 1972
A Great American Tragedy	October 18, 1972
Oliver and the Artful Dodger	October 21–28, 1972
Short Walk to Daylight	October 24, 1972
Family Flight	October 25, 1972
The Bounty Man	October 31, 1972
That Certain Summer	November 1, 1972
The Adventures of Robin Hoodnik	November 4, 1972
The Crooked Hearts	November 8, 1972
Lassie and the Spirit of Thunder Mountain	November 11, 1972
The Victim	November 14, 1972
Gidget Makes the Wrong Connection	November 18, 1972
All My Darling Daughters	November 22, 1972
The Banana Splits in Hocus Pocus Park	November 25, 1972
Home for the Holidays	November 28, 1972
The Heist	November 29, 1972
Tabitha and Adam and the Clown Family	December 2, 1972
The Couple Takes a Wife	December 5, 1972
The Red Baron	December 9, 1972
Pursuit	December 12, 1972
Every Man Needs One	December 13, 1972
Daffy Duck and Porky Pig Meet the Groovie Goolies	December 16, 1972
The Weekend Nun	December 20, 1972

=== 1973 ===
Title	Premiere date
Firehouse	January 2, 1973
Luvcast U.S.A.	January 6, 1973
The Devil's Daughter	January 9, 1973
That Girl in Wonderland	January 13, 1973
Trouble Comes to Town	January 10, 1973
The Night Strangler	January 16, 1973
Frankenstein	January 16, 1973
Female Artillery	January 17, 1973
Go Ask Alice	January 24, 1973
A Cold Night's Death	January 30, 1973
Snatched	January 31, 1973
Divorce His, Divorce Hers	February 6–7, 1973
The Great American Beauty Contest	February 13, 1973
The Girls of Huntington House	February 14, 1973
A Brand New Life	February 20, 1973
And No One Could Save Her	February 21, 1973
The Connection	February 23, 1973
You'll Never See Me Again	February 28, 1973
The Letters	March 6, 1973
The Six Million Dollar Man	March 7, 1973
The Bait	March 13, 1973
Class of '63	March 14, 1973
Beg, Borrow or Steal	March 20, 1973
Toma	March 21, 1973
The Gift of Terror	April 5, 1973
The Picture of Dorian Gray	April 23, 1973
The Man Without a Country	April 24, 1973
Lost in Space	September 8, 1973
Deliver Us From Evil	September 11, 1973
She Lives!	September 12, 1973
Dying Room Only	September 18, 1973
Satan's School for Girls	September 19, 1973
Smile When You Say 'I Do'	September 25, 1973
Hijack	September 26, 1973
Runaway!	September 29, 1973
Isn't It Shocking?	October 2, 1973
Letters from Three Lovers	October 3, 1973
The Alpha Caper	October 6, 1973
The Merchant of Venice	October 7, 1973
Shirts/Skins	October 9, 1973
Don't Be Afraid of the Dark	October 10, 1973
Double Indemnity	October 13, 1973
The Third Girl from the Left	October 16, 1973
The Man Who Could Talk to Kids	October 17, 1973
The Six Million Dollar Man: Wine, Women, and War	October 20, 1973
The President's Plane Is Missing	October 23, 1973
The Mini-Munsters	October 27, 1973
Money to Burn	October 27, 1973
Ordeal	October 30, 1973
Guess Who's Sleeping in My Bed?	October 31, 1973
Linda	November 3, 1973
The Girl Most Likely To...	November 6, 1973
My Darling Daughters' Anniversary	November 7, 1973
The Death Race	November 10, 1973
Trapped	November 14, 1973
Nanny and the Professor and the Phantom of the Circus	November 17, 1973
The Six Million Dollar Man: The Solid Gold Kidnapping	November 17, 1973
The Affair	November 20, 1973
Scream, Pretty Peggy	November 24, 1973
Cry Rape!	November 27, 1973
Outrage	November 28, 1973
A Summer Without Boys	December 4, 1973
Blood Sport	December 5, 1973
Maneater	December 8, 1973
The Cat Creature	December 11, 1973
Message to My Daughter	December 12, 1973
The Glass Menagerie	December 16, 1973
What Are Best Friends For?	December 18, 1973
Pioneer Woman	December 19, 1973
A Dream for Christmas	December 24, 1973

=== 1974 ===
Title	Premiere date
Indict and Convict	January 6, 1974
F. Scott Fitzgerald and 'The Last of the Belles'	January 7, 1974
The Death Squad	January 8, 1974
Shootout in a One-Dog Town	January 9, 1974
Mrs. Sundance	January 15, 1974
Scream of the Wolf	January 16, 1974
Skyway to Death	January 19, 1974
Get Christie Love!	January 22, 1974
Pray for the Wildcats	January 23, 1974
Heatwave!	January 26, 1974
The Girl Who Came Gift-Wrapped	January 29, 1974
Killdozer!	February 2, 1974
Smile, Jenny, You're Dead	February 3, 1974
Can Ellen Be Saved?	February 5, 1974
Cry Panic!	February 6, 1974
The Elevator	February 9, 1974
I Love You, Goodbye	February 12, 1974
The Morning After	February 13, 1974
Live Again, Die Again	February 16, 1974
Hitchhike!	February 23, 1974
Killer Bees	February 26, 1974
Unwed Father	February 27, 1974
Houston, We've Got a Problem	March 2, 1974
The Stranger Who Looks Like Me	March 6, 1974
Mousey	March 9, 1974
Wonder Woman	March 12, 1974
The Hanged Man	March 13, 1974
Men of the Dragon	March 20, 1974
A Cry in the Wilderness	March 26, 1974
The Gun and the Pulpit	April 3, 1974
The Story of Jacob and Joseph	April 7, 1974
Melvin Purvis: G-Man	April 9, 1974
Murder or Mercy?	April 10, 1974
Thursday's Game	April 14, 1974
Winter Kill	April 15, 1974
The Turn of the Screw	April 15, 1974
The Last Angry Man	April 16, 1974
Nakia	April 17, 1974
The Chadwick Family	April 17, 1974
Planet Earth	April 23, 1974
The Story of Pretty Boy Floyd	May 7, 1974
Hurricane	September 10, 1974
Savages	September 11, 1974
The Sex Symbol	September 17, 1974
The Day the Earth Moved	September 18, 1974
The Great Niagara	September 24, 1974
The California Kid	September 25, 1974
The Stranger Within	October 1, 1974
Death Sentence	October 2, 1974
Hit Lady	October 8, 1974
Locusts	October 9, 1974
Trapped Beneath the Sea	October 22, 1974
Bad Ronald	October 23, 1974
The Mark of Zorro	October 29, 1974
Death Cruise	October 30, 1974
The Great Ice Rip-Off	November 6, 1974
All the Kind Strangers	November 12, 1974
Screamer	November 12, 1974
The Gun	November 13, 1974
It Couldn't Happen to a Nicer Guy	November 19, 1974
Panic on the 5:22	November 20, 1974
Reflections of Murder	November 24, 1974
The Godchild	November 26, 1974
Betrayal	December 3, 1974
Only with Married Men	December 4, 1974
The Tribe	December 11, 1974
Roll, Freddy, Roll!	December 17, 1974
Judge Dee and the Monastery Murders	December 29, 1974

=== 1975 ===
Title	Premiere date
Antony and Cleopatra	January 4, 1975
Ceremonies in Dark Old Men	January 6, 1975
Let's Switch!	January 7, 1975
The Missing Are Deadly	January 8, 1975
Satan's Triangle	January 14, 1975
The Hatfields and the McCoys	January 15, 1975
The Abduction of Saint Anne	January 21, 1975
The Honorable Sam Houston	January 22, 1975
The Daughters of Joshua Cabe Return	January 28, 1975
Death Be Not Proud	February 4, 1975
All Together Now	February 5, 1975
The Legend of Lizzie Borden	February 10, 1975
The Trial of Chaplain Jensen	February 11, 1975
A Cry for Help	February 12, 1975
The Family Nobody Wanted	February 19, 1975
Hustling	February 22, 1975
You Lie So Deep, My Love	February 25, 1975
Someone I Touched	February 26, 1975
Trilogy of Terror	March 4, 1975
The Desperate Miles	March 5, 1975
Love Among the Ruins	March 6, 1975
Search for the Gods	March 9, 1975
Huckleberry Finn	March 25, 1975
The Nurse Killer	March 31, 1975
Dead Man on the Run	April 2, 1975
I Will Fight No More Forever	April 14, 1975
The Swiss Family Robinson	April 15, 1975
Returning Home	April 29, 1975
Starsky & Hutch	April 30, 1975
Matt Helm	May 7, 1975
The First 36 Hours of Dr. Durant	May 13, 1975
Promise Him Anything	May 14, 1975
Friendly Persuasion	May 18, 1975
A Moon for the Misbegotten	May 27, 1975
My Father's House	June 1, 1975
Man on the Outside	June 29, 1975
Strange New World	July 13, 1975
Mobile Two	September 2, 1975
The Kansas City Massacre	September 19, 1975
Katherine	October 5, 1975
Sweet Hostage	October 10, 1975
The Night That Panicked America	October 31, 1975
The New Original Wonder Woman	November 7, 1975
Hey, I'm Alive	November 7, 1975
Murder on Flight 502	November 21, 1975
The Legend of Valentino	November 23, 1975

=== 1976 ===
Title	Premiere date
Collision Course: Truman vs. MacArthur	January 4, 1976
Eleanor and Franklin	January 11–12, 1976
The Macahans	January 19, 1976
Louis Armstrong – Chicago Style	January 25, 1976
Griffin and Phoenix	February 27, 1976
Young Pioneers	March 1, 1976
One of My Wives Is Missing	March 5, 1976
Dead on Target	March 17, 1976
Time Travelers	March 19, 1976
Most Wanted	March 21, 1976
Charlie's Angels	March 21, 1976
The Killer Who Wouldn't Die	April 4, 1976
The Story of David	April 9, 1976
Twin Detectives	May 1, 1976
Future Cop	May 1, 1976
Kiss Me, Kill Me	May 8, 1976
Brenda Starr	May 8, 1976
Return to Earth	May 14, 1976
Panache	May 15, 1976
High Risk	May 15, 1976
F. Scott Fitzgerald in Hollywood	May 16, 1976
The New Daughters of Joshua Cabe	May 29, 1976
Death at Love House	September 3, 1976
Bridger	September 10, 1976
Street Killing	September 12, 1976
The Love Boat	September 17, 1976
Wanted: The Sundance Woman	October 1, 1976
The Great Houdini	October 8, 1976
Having Babies	October 17, 1976
Look What's Happened to Rosemary's Baby	October 29, 1976
Nightmare in Badham County	November 5, 1976
21 Hours at Munich	November 7, 1976
The Boy in the Plastic Bubble	November 12, 1976
Revenge for a Rape	November 19, 1976
Smash-Up on Interstate 5	December 3, 1976
Victory at Entebbe	December 13, 1976
Young Pioneers' Christmas	December 17, 1976

=== 1977 ===
Title	Premiere date
Green Eyes	January 3, 1977
Fantasy Island	January 14, 1977
Little Ladies of the Night	January 16, 1977
The Love Boat II	January 21, 1977
The Last Dinosaur	February 11, 1977
Secrets	February 20, 1977
SST: Death Flight	February 25, 1977
Dog and Cat	March 5, 1977
Eleanor and Franklin: The White House Years	March 13, 1977
Murder at the World Series	March 20, 1977
Roger & Harry: The Mitera Target	May 2, 1977
The New Love Boat	May 5, 1977
Delta County, U.S.A.	May 20, 1977
Lucan	May 22, 1977
Good Against Evil	May 22, 1977
The Quinns	July 1, 1977
Curse of the Black Widow	September 16, 1977
Young Joe, the Forgotten Kennedy	September 18, 1977
The Trial of Lee Harvey Oswald	September 30, 1977
Black Market Baby	October 7, 1977
Having Babies II	October 28, 1977
Telethon	November 6, 1977
Intimate Strangers	November 11, 1977
Mary White	November 18, 1977
It Happened at Lakewood Manor	December 2, 1977
The Gathering	December 4, 1977
Captains Courageous	December 4, 1977
It Happened One Christmas	December 11, 1977

=== 1978 ===
Title	Premiere date
Breaking Up	January 2, 1978
Superdome	January 9, 1978
Return to Fantasy Island	January 20, 1978
The Bermuda Depths	January 27, 1978
Night Cries	January 29, 1978
Cruise Into Terror	February 3, 1978
The Initiation of Sarah	February 6, 1978
Three on a Date	February 17, 1978
Wild and Wooly	February 20, 1978
Dr. Scorpion	February 24, 1978
Having Babies III	March 3, 1978
Keefer	March 16, 1978
Doctors' Private Lives	March 20, 1978
Cindy	March 24, 1978
The Two-Five	April 14, 1978
Stickin' Together	April 14, 1978
Go West, Young Girl	April 27, 1978
With This Ring	May 5, 1978
Leave Yesterday Behind	May 14, 1978
True Grit: A Further Adventure	May 19, 1978
Kate Bliss and the Ticker Tape Kid	May 26, 1978
The Last Tenant	June 25, 1978
The New Maverick	September 3, 1978
Battlestar Galactica	September 17, 1978
The Users	October 1, 1978
A Guide for the Married Woman	October 13, 1978
More Than Friends	October 20, 1978
Crash	October 29, 1978
How to Pick Up Girls!	November 3, 1978
The Gift of Love	December 8, 1978
Long Journey Back	December 15, 1978
Who Are the DeBolts? And Where Did They Get Nineteen Kids?	December 17, 1978
The Nativity	December 17, 1978

=== 1979 ===
Title	Premiere date
Dallas Cowboy Cheerleaders	January 14, 1979
A Last Cry for Help	January 19, 1979
Salvage	January 20, 1979
The Girls in the Office	February 2, 1979
Elvis	February 11, 1979
The Child Stealer	March 9, 1979
The Ordeal of Patty Hearst	March 14, 1979
The Cracker Factory	March 16, 1979
The Jericho Mile	March 18, 1979
Like Normal People	April 13, 1979
The Billion Dollar Threat	April 15, 1979
Friendly Fire	April 22, 1979
Samurai	April 30, 1979
Beach Patrol	April 30, 1979
The Power Within	May 11, 1979
The Night Rider	May 11, 1979
The Return of the Mod Squad	May 18, 1979
Love's Savage Fury	May 20, 1979
A Vacation in Hell	May 21, 1979
Hot Rod	May 25, 1979
The House on Garibaldi Street	May 28, 1979
Hollow Image	June 24, 1979
The Return of Charlie Chan	July 17, 1979
Hart to Hart	August 25, 1979
Diary of a Teenage Hitchhiker	September 21, 1979
S.O.S. Titanic	September 23, 1979
Before and After	October 5, 1979
Vampire	October 7, 1979
The Death of Ocean View Park	October 19, 1979
Marciano	October 21, 1979
Disaster on the Coastliner	October 28, 1979
Topper	November 9, 1979
Love for Rent	November 11, 1979
Birth of the Beatles	November 23, 1979
When She Was Bad...	November 25, 1979
Valentine	December 7, 1979
An American Christmas Carol	December 16, 1979

== 1980s ==
=== 1980 ===
Title	Premiere date
Dan August: Once Is Never Enough	January 1, 1980
Stunts Unlimited	January 4, 1980
Dan August: The Jealousy Factor	February 4, 1980
Amber Waves	March 9, 1980
Where the Ladies Go	March 14, 1980
Waikiki	April 21, 1980
The Return of the King	May 11, 1980
The Hustler of Muscle Beach	May 16, 1980
Mysteries of the Sea	May 18, 1980
Reward	May 23, 1980
Dan August: The Trouble with Women	June 1, 1980
Turnover Smith	June 8, 1980
Trouble in High Timber Country	June 27, 1980
Casino	August 1, 1980
The Women's Room	September 14, 1980
A Family of Strangers	September 24, 1980
Dan August: The Lady Killers	November 10, 1980
The Babysitter	November 28, 1980
Dan August: Murder, My Friend	November 30, 1980
The Night the City Screamed	December 14, 1980
A Time for Miracles	December 21, 1980
The Shadow Box	December 28, 1980

=== 1981 ===
Title	Premiere date
A Whale for the Killing	February 1, 1981
This House Possessed	February 6, 1981
The Intruder Within	February 20, 1981
Midnight Offerings	February 27, 1981
Miracle on Ice	March 1, 1981
Crazy Times	April 10, 1981
The Phoenix	April 26, 1981
Sixty Years of Seduction	May 4, 1981
The Best Little Girl in the World	May 11, 1981
She's in the Army Now	May 15, 1981
Freedom	May 18, 1981
Code Red	September 20, 1981
Golden Gate	September 25, 1981
Jacqueline Bouvier Kennedy	October 14, 1981
The Day the Loving Stopped	October 16, 1981
A Long Way Home	December 6, 1981
Summer Solstice	December 30, 1981

=== 1982 ===
Title	Premiere date
Fantasies	January 18, 1982
My Body, My Child	April 12, 1982
Mae West	May 2, 1982
The Letter	May 3, 1982
Inside the Third Reich	May 9, 1982
Dreams Don't Die	May 21, 1982
In the Custody of Strangers	May 26, 1982
Benny's Place	May 31, 1982
The Renegades	August 11, 1982
For Lovers Only	October 15, 1982
Desire, the Vampire	November 15, 1982
Don't Go to Sleep	December 10, 1982
The Wild Women of Chastity Gulch	October 31, 1982
Victims	January 11, 1982

=== 1983 ===
Title	Premiere date
Malibu	January 23–24, 1983
Confessions of a Married Man	January 31, 1983
Who Will Love My Children?	February 14, 1983
Grace Kelly	February 21, 1983
Starflight: The Plane That Couldn't Land	February 27, 1983
Deadly Lessons	March 7, 1983
The Face of Rage	March 20, 1983
Intimate Agony	March 21, 1983
Ryan's Four	April 5–27, 1983
Legs	May 2, 1983
Travis McGee	May 18, 1983
The Sins of Dorian Gray	May 27, 1983
The Last Ninja	July 7, 1983
Shooting Stars	July 28, 1983
Making of a Male Model	October 9, 1983
A Killer in the Family	October 30, 1983
The Day After	November 20, 1983
Heart of Steel	December 4, 1983
Through Naked Eyes	December 11, 1983

=== 1984 ===
Title	Premiere date
Something About Amelia	January 9, 1984
Amazons	January 29, 1984
When She Says No	January 30, 1984
My Mother's Secret Life	February 5, 1984
Lace	February 26–27, 1984
A Streetcar Named Desire	March 4, 1984
Best Kept Secrets	March 26, 1984
Sins of the Past	April 2, 1984
The Dollmaker	May 13, 1984
Ernie Kovacs: Between the Laughter	May 14, 1984
The Return of Marcus Welby, M.D.	May 16, 1984
The Mystic Warrior	May 20, 1984
Spraggue	June 29, 1984
Heartsounds	September 30, 1984
The Three Wishes of Billy Grier	November 1, 1984
Caravan of Courage: An Ewok Adventure	November 25, 1984
The Night They Saved Christmas	December 13, 1984

=== 1985 ===
Title	Premiere date
The Hearst and Davies Affair	January 14, 1985
Starcrossed	January 31, 1985
Consenting Adult	February 4, 1985
The Bad Seed	February 7, 1985
Surviving: A Family in Crisis	February 10, 1985
Challenge of a Lifetime	February 14, 1985
Deadly Messages	February 21, 1985
A Bunny's Tale	February 25, 1985
Kicks	March 11, 1985
This Wife for Hire	March 18, 1985
California Girls	March 24, 1985
Love Lives On	April 1, 1985
Enormous Changes at the Last Minute	April 11, 1985
Lady Blue	April 15, 1985
Embassy	April 21,1985
Lace II	May 5–6, 1985
Letting Go	May 11, 1985
A Death in California	May 12, 1985
Deadly Intentions	May 19, 1985
Generation	May 24, 1985
International Airport	May 25, 1985
The Rape of Richard Beck	May 27, 1985
Gidget's Summer Reunion	June 1, 1985
Command 5	August 7, 1985
In Like Flynn	August 14, 1985
J.O.E. and the Colonel	September 11, 1985
Toughlove	October 13, 1985
The Midnight Hour	November 1, 1985
The Blue Yonder	November 17, 1985
The Execution of Raymond Graham	November 17, 1985
Ewoks: The Battle for Endor	November 24, 1985

=== 1986 ===
Title	Premiere date
The Defiant Ones	January 5, 1986
Shattered Spirits	January 6, 1986
The Right of the People	January 13, 1986
Club Med	January 19, 1986
Prince of Bel Air	January 20, 1986
Help Wanted: Kids	February 2, 1986
The Gladiator	February 3, 1986
Time Flyer	February 9, 1986
Harem	February 9, 1986
The Last Electric Knight	February 16, 1986
2½ Dads	February 16, 1986
Choices	February 17, 1986
The Girl Who Spelled Freedom	February 23, 1986
The Children of Times Square	March 3, 1986
The Richest Cat in the World	March 9, 1986
Between Two Women	March 10, 1986
Pleasures	March 31, 1986
Charley Hannah	April 5, 1986
I-Man	April 6, 1986
My Two Loves	April 7, 1986
A Fighting Choice	April 13, 1986
Mr. Boogedy	April 20, 1986
Alex: The Life of a Child	April 23, 1986
Young Again	May 11, 1986
Convicted	May 12, 1986
Fuzzbucket	May 18, 1986
The Deacon Street Deer	May 18, 1986
Brotherhood of Justice	May 18, 1986
Casebusters	May 25, 1986
My Town	May 25, 1986
Northstar	August 10, 1986
Dark Mansions	August 23, 1986
Hero in the Family	September 28, 1986
Little Spies	October 5, 1986
The B.R.A.T. Patrol	October 26, 1986
The Leftovers	November 16, 1986
The Thanksgiving Promise	November 23, 1986
Fluppy Dogs	November 27, 1986
Sunday Drive	November 30, 1986
The Christmas Star	December 14, 1986
A Smoky Mountain Christmas	December 14, 1986

=== 1987 ===
Title	Premiere date
Out on a Limb	January 18, 1987
Double Switch	January 25, 1987
You Ruined My Life	February 1, 1987
The Liberators	February 8, 1987
The Last Fling	February 9, 1987
Love Among Thieves	February 23, 1987
The Betty Ford Story	March 2, 1987
Bigfoot	March 8, 1987
Young Harry Houdini	March 15, 1987
Fight for Life	March 23, 1987
Double Agent	March 29, 1987
Destination America	April 3, 1987
Sworn to Silence	April 6, 1987
Bride of Boogedy	April 12, 1987
Infidelity	April 13, 1987
Harry's Hong Kong	May 8, 1987
Basements	May 12, 1987
Island Sons	May 15, 1987
Celebration Family	May 24, 1987
Cracked Up	May 26, 1987
Riviera	May 31, 1987
The Man Who Fell to Earth	August 23, 1987
Bluffing It	September 13, 1987
Desperate	September 19, 1987
The Return of the Shaggy Dog	November 1–8, 1987
Student Exchange	November 29, 1987
Plaza Suite	December 3, 1987

=== 1988 ===
Title	Premiere date
Evil in Clear River	January 11, 1988
Stranger on My Land	January 17, 1988
Earth Star Voyager	January 17–24, 1988
What Price Victory	January 18, 1988
A Father's Revenge	January 24, 1988
Weekend War	February 1, 1988
Rock 'n' Roll Mom	February 7, 1988
Elvis and Me	February 7, 1988
Perfect People	February 29, 1988
14 Going on 30	March 6–13, 1988
Longarm	March 6, 1988
God Bless the Child	March 21, 1988
Nitti: The Enforcer	April 17, 1988
The Town Bully	April 24, 1988
Little Girl Lost	April 25, 1988
Onassis: The Richest Man in the World	May 1, 1988
Splash, Too	May 1–8, 1988
Justin Case	May 15, 1988
Meet the Munceys	May 22, 1988
Baby M	May 22, 1988
Omnibus	May 26, 1988
Deadline: Madrid	September 1, 1988
David	October 25, 1988
Ladykillers	November 9, 1988
Disaster at Silo 7	November 27, 1988
My First Love	December 4, 1988
Roots: The Gift	December 11, 1988

=== 1989 ===
Title	Premiere date
Passion and Paradise	February 19–21, 1989
Get Smart, Again!	February 26, 1989
The Penthouse	March 5, 1989
The Women of Brewster Place	March 19–20, 1989
Peter Gunn	April 23, 1989
The Preppie Murder	September 24, 1989
I Love You Perfect	October 8, 1989
Kojak: Ariana	November 4, 1989
Small Sacrifices	November 12–14, 1989
Blind Witness	November 26, 1989
Kojak: Fatal Flaw	November 30, 1989
The Shell Seekers	December 3, 1989
My Brother's Wife	December 17, 1989

== 1990s ==
=== 1990 ===
Title	Premiere date
Kojak: Flowers for Matty	January 4, 1990
Rock Hudson	January 8, 1990
Jury Duty: The Comedy	January 14, 1990
Unspeakable Acts	January 15, 1990
Jekyll & Hyde	January 21, 1990
Rich Men, Single Women	January 29, 1990
Kojak: It's Always Something	February 3, 1990
Anything to Survive	February 5, 1990
Challenger	February 25, 1990
Daughter of the Streets	February 26, 1990
A Son's Promise	March 5, 1990
Love and Lies	March 18, 1990
Kojak: None so Blind	April 7, 1990
Summer Dreams: The Story of the Beach Boys	April 29, 1990
Burning Bridges	May 6, 1990
The Knife and Gun Club	July 30, 1990
Project: Tinman	July 30, 1990
When You Remember Me	October 7, 1990
In Defense of a Married Man	October 14, 1990
The Bride in Black	October 21, 1990
The Last Best Year	November 4, 1990
Call Me Anna	November 11, 1990
She'll Take Romance	November 25, 1990

=== 1991 ===
Title	Premiere date
Danger Team	1991
Dillinger	January 6, 1991
Under Cover	January 7, 1991
Held Hostage: The Sis and Jerry Levin Story	January 13, 1991
The Whereabouts of Jenny	January 14, 1991
The Last to Go	January 21, 1991
Tagteam	January 26, 1991
Deadly Intentions... Again?	February 11, 1991
What Ever Happened to Baby Jane?	February 17, 1991
Fire: Trapped on the 37th Floor	February 18, 1991
Columbo: Caution! Murder Can Be Hazardous to Your Health	February 20, 1991
Earth Angel	March 4, 1991
Lucky Day	March 11, 1991
Stop at Nothing	March 12, 1991
The Boys	April 15, 1991
The Perfect Tribute	April 21, 1991
Night of the Hunter	May 5, 1991
Our Sons	May 19, 1991
Plymouth	May 26, 1991
The Hit Man	June 29, 1991
Finding the Way Home	August 26, 1991
To Save a Child	September 8, 1991
Marilyn and Me	September 22, 1991
Keeping Secrets	September 29, 1991
The Heroes of Desert Storm	October 6, 1991
Captive	October 18, 1991
Dynasty: The Reunion	October 20–22, 1991
Stranger in the Family	October 27, 1991
False Arrest	November 3–6, 1991
Wife, Mother, Murderer	November 10, 1991
Backfield in Motion	November 13, 1991
The Woman Who Sinned	November 17, 1991
The Entertainers	November 21, 1991
Dead and Alive: The Race for Gus Farace	November 24, 1991
Yes Virginia, There Is a Santa Claus	December 8, 1991

=== 1992 ===
Title	Premiere date
Survive the Savage Sea	January 6, 1992
She Woke Up	January 19, 1992
Bed of Lies	January 20, 1992
The Broken Cord	February 3, 1992
Columbo: No Time to Die	February 15, 1992
Crash Landing: The Rescue of Flight 232	February 24, 1992
Those Secrets	March 16, 1992
Broadway Bound	March 23, 1992
Something to Live for: The Alison Gertz Story	March 29, 1992
Seduction: Three Tales from the 'Inner Sanctum'	April 5, 1992
Stay the Night	April 26–27, 1992
Stormy Weathers	May 4, 1992
Sexual Advances	May 10, 1992
Criminal Behavior	May 11, 1992
Calendar Girl, Cop, Killer? The Bambi Bembenek Story	May 18, 1992
Ladykiller	July 5, 1992
A Murderous Affair: The Carolyn Warmus Story	September 13, 1992
Somebody's Daughter	September 20, 1992
Obsessed	September 27, 1992
Casino	October 1992
Exclusive	October 4, 1992
Overexposed	October 11, 1992
Willing to Kill: The Texas Cheerleader Story	November 8, 1992
The Jacksons: An American Dream	November 15–18, 1992
To Grandmother's House We Go	December 6, 1992
Charles and Diana: Unhappily Ever After	December 13, 1992
Lincoln	December 26, 1992

=== 1993 ===
Title	Premiere date
The Amy Fisher Story	January 3, 1993
Dead Before Dawn	January 10, 1993
Kiss of a Killer	February 1, 1993
I Yabba-Dabba Do!	February 7, 1993
Firestorm: 72 Hours in Oakland	February 7, 1993
Gregory K	February 8, 1993
Ordeal in the Arctic	February 15, 1993
Between Love and Hate	February 22, 1993
Not in My Family	February 28, 1993
They've Taken Our Children: The Chowchilla Kidnapping	March 1, 1993
Lies and Lullabies	March 14, 1993
For Their Own Good	April 5, 1993
Class of '61	April 12, 1993
The Woman Who Loved Elvis	April 18, 1993
Doorways	April 21, 1993
Murder in the Heartland	May 3, 1993
Deadly Relations	May 22, 1993
Torch Song	May 23, 1993
The Last P.O.W.? The Bobby Garwood Story	June 28, 1993
Shameful Secrets	October 10, 1993
A Stranger in the Mirror	October 24, 1993
Double, Double, Toil and Trouble	October 30, 1993
Hart to Hart Returns	November 5, 1993
A Mother's Revenge	November 14, 1993
There Are No Children Here	November 28, 1993
Hollyrock-a-Bye Baby	December 5, 1993
Desperate Rescue: The Allison Wilcox Story	December 5, 1993
The Only Way Out	December 19, 1993

=== 1994 ===
Title	Premiere date
Out of Darkness	January 16, 1994
Betrayed by Love	January 17, 1994
My Name Is Kate	January 24, 1994
Lies of the Heart: The Story of Laurie Kellogg	January 31, 1994
Hart to Hart: Home Is Where the Hart Is	February 18, 1994
One More Mountain	March 6, 1994
Hart to Hart: Crimes of the Heart	March 25, 1994
The Yarn Princess	March 27, 1994
Beyond Obsession	April 4, 1994
Texas	April 16–18, 1994
A Passion for Justice: The Hazel Brannon Smith Story	April 17, 1994
Ride with the Wind	April 18, 1994
Getting Out	April 25, 1994
A Place for Annie	May 1, 1994
Columbo: Undercover	May 2, 1994
Hart to Hart: Old Friends Never Die	May 6, 1994
MacGyver: Lost Treasure of Atlantis	May 14, 1994
One of Her Own	May 16, 1994
Couples	July 2, 1994
Running Delilah	August 29, 1994
Boys Will Be Boys	September 15, 1994
Where Are My Children?	September 18, 1994
For the Love of Nancy	October 2, 1994
Summertime Switch	October 8, 1994
Nowhere to Hide	October 9, 1994
Father and Scout	October 15, 1994
Without Consent	October 16, 1994
Against Their Will	October 30, 1994
The Shaggy Dog	November 12, 1994
How the West Was Fun	November 19, 1994
A Flintstones Christmas Carol	November 21, 1994
MacGyver: Trail to Doomsday	November 24, 1994
Someone Else's Child	December 4, 1994
Don't Drink the Water	December 18, 1994

=== 1995 ===
Title	Premiere date
A Dangerous Affair	January 1, 1995
See Jane Run	January 8, 1995
Fighting for My Daughter	January 9, 1995
Death in Small Doses	January 16, 1995
Texas Justice	February 12–13, 1995
The Computer Wore Tennis Shoes	February 18, 1995
Falling from the Sky: Flight 174	February 20, 1995
Hart to Hart: Secrets of the Hart	March 6, 1995
Abandoned and Deceived	March 20, 1995
The Great Elephant Escape	March 25, 1995
Sleep, Baby, Sleep	March 26, 1995
A Horse for Danny	April 8, 1995
Spring Fling!	April 15, 1995
Escape to Witch Mountain	April 29, 1995
Freaky Friday	May 6, 1995
Columbo: Strange Bedfellows	May 8, 1995
She Stood Alone: The Tailhook Scandal	May 22, 1995
Secrets	May 25, 1995
Johnny's Girl	May 27, 1995
The Man Who Wouldn't Die	May 29, 1995
The Ranger, the Cook and a Hole in the Sky	June 15, 1995
Derby	June 17, 1995
Past the Bleachers	June 22, 1995
The Stranger Beside Me	September 17, 1995
The Great Mom Swap	September 23, 1995
Trial by Fire	October 1, 1995
Picture Perfect	October 14, 1995
The Surrogate	October 22, 1995
The Barefoot Executive	November 11, 1995
Annie: A Royal Adventure!	November 18, 1995
Bye Bye Birdie	December 3, 1995
Never Say Never: The Deidre Hall Story	December 10, 1995
Dare to Love	December 17, 1995

=== 1996 ===
Title	Premiere date
Have You Seen My Son	January 8, 1996
Legend of the Ruby Silver	January 13, 1996
Kiss and Tell	January 15, 1996
The Man Next Door	January 18, 1996
Innocent Victims	January 21–22, 1996
The Canterville Ghost	January 27, 1996
Hijacked: Flight 285	February 4, 1996
No One Could Protect Her	February 11, 1996
Project ALF	February 17, 1996
A Case for Life	February 18, 1996
A Kidnapping in the Family	February 26, 1996
Dalva	March 3, 1996
Forgotten Sins	March 7, 1996
Frequent Flyer	March 10, 1996
In the Blink of an Eye	March 24, 1996
Radiant City	March 31, 1996
Bermuda Triangle	April 4, 1996
Brothers of the Frontier	April 6, 1996
All She Ever Wanted	April 14, 1996
Encino Woman	April 20, 1996
She Woke Up Pregnant	April 28, 1996
Angel Flight Down	April 29, 1996
Wiseguy	May 2, 1996
An Unfinished Affair	May 5, 1996
My Son Is Innocent	May 6, 1996
Two Mothers for Zachary	September 22, 1996
A Loss of Innocence	September 24, 1996
Sudden Terror: The Hijacking of School Bus #17	October 13, 1996
Talk to Me	October 20, 1996
To Brave Alaska	November 3, 1996
For Hope	November 17, 1996
Loch Ness	November 23, 1996
Dying to Be Perfect: The Ellen Hart Pena Story	November 24, 1996
Suddenly	December 1, 1996
To Love, Honor and Deceive	December 15, 1996
The Christmas Tree	December 22, 1996
Breaking Through	December 30, 1996

=== 1997 ===
Title	Premiere date
Echo	January 5, 1997
Badge of Betrayal	January 6, 1997
Close to Danger	January 13, 1997
All Lies End in Murder	January 19, 1997
Tell Me No Secrets	January 20, 1997
Beverly Hills Family Robinson	January 25, 1997
Seduction in a Small Town	February 9, 1997
Payback	February 10, 1997
...First Do No Harm	February 16, 1997
Volcano: Fire on the Mountain	February 23, 1997
The Apocalypse Watch	March 2–3, 1997
Alibi	March 16, 1997
Lies He Told	March 17, 1997
Out of Nowhere	March 23, 1997
About Us: The Dignity of Children	March 29, 1997
When Secrets Kill	April 6, 1997
Mother Knows Best	April 13, 1997
A Deadly Vision	April 21, 1997
Tidal Wave: No Escape	May 5, 1997
20,000 Leagues Under the Sea	May 11–12, 1997
Detention: The Siege at Johnson High	May 19, 1997
Crowned and Dangerous	September 21, 1997
Two Came Back	September 28, 1997
Toothless	October 5, 1997
The Advocate's Devil	October 5, 1997
Unwed Father	October 12, 1997
Bad to the Bone	October 19, 1997
Tower of Terror	October 26, 1997
The Devil's Child	October 26, 1997
Cinderella	November 2, 1997
Before Women Had Wings	November 2, 1997
Into Thin Air: Death on Everest	November 9, 1997
Oliver Twist	November 16, 1997
Medusa's Child	November 16–20, 1997
Dead by Midnight	November 23, 1997
The Love Bug	November 30, 1997
Forbidden Territory: Stanley's Search for Livingstone	December 7, 1997
Holiday in Your Heart	December 14, 1997
Flash	December 21, 1997

=== 1998 ===
Title	Premiere date
Principal Takes a Holiday	January 4, 1998
Outrage	January 4, 1998
I Know What You Did	January 11, 1998
On the Line	January 15, 1998
Nightmare Street	January 18, 1998
The Taking of Pelham One Two Three	February 1, 1998
Target Earth	February 5, 1998
Bad As I Wanna Be: The Dennis Rodman Story	February 8, 1998
The Garbage Picking Field Goal Kicking Philadelphia Phenomenon	February 15, 1998
Virtual Obsession	February 26, 1998
Blood on Her Hands	March 22, 1998
Nobody Lives Forever	March 26, 1998
Safety Patrol	March 29, 1998
Tempting Fate	April 5, 1998
My Date with the President's Daughter	April 19, 1998
Mind Games	April 19, 1998
Miracle at Midnight	May 17, 1998
Creature	May 17–18, 1998
Ice	July 22, 2000
Sabrina Goes to Rome	October 4, 1998
Don't Look Down	October 29, 1998
David and Lisa	November 1, 1998
A Knight in Camelot	November 8, 1998
Rear Window	November 22, 1998
Murder She Purred: A Mrs. Murphy Mystery	December 13, 1998

=== 1999 ===
Title	Premiere date
Selma, Lord, Selma	January 17, 1999
Murder at Devil's Glen	January 18, 1999
A Saintly Switch	January 24, 1999
My Last Love	January 25, 1999
NetForce	February 1–4, 1999
Storm of the Century	February 14–18, 1999
And the Beat Goes On: The Sonny and Cher Story	February 22, 1999
Mind Prey	March 22, 1999
Love Letters	April 12, 1999
Swing Vote	April 19, 1999
Our Guys: Outrage at Glen Ridge	May 10, 1999
Double Platinum	May 16, 1999
Half a Dozen Babies	May 17, 1999
Cleopatra	May 23–24, 1999
A.T.F.	September 6, 1999
Sabrina Down Under	September 26, 1999
Annie	November 7, 1999
Come On Get Happy: The Partridge Family Story	November 13, 1999
Tuesdays with Morrie	December 5, 1999
Switching Goals	December 12, 1999

== 2000s ==
=== 2000 ===
Title	Premiere date
King of the World	January 10, 2000
The Loretta Claiborne Story	January 16, 2000
Mary and Rhoda	February 7, 2000
The Beach Boys: An American Family	February 27 –28, 2000
Life-Size	March 5, 2000
Model Behavior	March 12, 2000
Satan's School for Girls	March 13, 2000
A Tale of Two Bunnies	March 20, 2000
The Audrey Hepburn Story	March 27, 2000
Mail to the Chief	April 2, 2000
Angels in the Infield	April 9, 2000
Trapped in a Purple Haze	April 17, 2000
The Miracle Maker	April 23, 2000
The Three Stooges	2000
Arabian Nights	April 30 – May 1, 2000
Geppetto	May 7, 2000
The Pooch and the Pauper	July 16, 2000
The Growing Pains Movie	November 5, 2000
The Miracle Worker	November 12, 2000
Santa Who?	November 19, 2000
Shooting War: World War II Combat Cameramen	December 7, 2000

=== 2001 ===
- Inside the Osmonds (February 5, 2001)
- These Old Broads (February 12, 2001)
- Life with Judy Garland: Me and My Shadows (February 25 – 26, 2001)
- Amy & Isabelle (March 4, 2001)
- Princess of Thieves (March 11, 2001)
- Columbo: Murder with Too Many Notes (March 12, 2001)
- South Pacific (March 26, 2001)
- Final Jeopardy (April 9, 2001)
- When Billie Beat Bobby (April 16, 2001)
- Ladies and the Champ (April 22, 2001)
- Kiss My Act (2001)
- Child Star: The Shirley Temple Story (May 13, 2001)
- Anne Frank: The Whole Story (May 20 – 21, 2001)
- Walt: The Man Behind the Myth (September 16, 2001)
- The Facts of Life Reunion (November 18, 2001)
- Brian's Song (December 2, 2001)

=== 2002 ===
Title	Premiere date
Confessions of an Ugly Stepsister	March 10, 2002
Snow White: The Fairest of Them All	March 17, 2002
Gilda Radner: It's Always Something	April 29, 2002
Prince William	September 29, 2002
Home Alone 4: Taking Back the House	November 3, 2002
Mr. St. Nick	November 17, 2002
The Pennsylvania Miners' Story	November 24, 2002
Nancy Drew	December 15, 2002

=== 2003 ===
- Then Came Jones (2003)
- The Street Lawyer (2003)
- 111 Gramercy Park (2003)
- Sounder (January 19, 2003)
- Columbo: Columbo Likes the Nightlife (January 30, 2003)
- The Music Man (February 16, 2003)
- Eloise at the Plaza (April 27, 2003)
- The Partners (May 1, 2003)
- The Challenge (November 15, 2003)
- The Diary of Ellen Rimbauer (May 12, 2003)
- Phenomenon II (November 1, 2003)
- Eloise at Christmastime (November 22, 2003)

=== 2004 ===
Title	Premiere date
The Mystery of Natalie Wood	February 4 – March 1, 2004
Growing Pains: Return of the Seavers	October 16, 2004
The Five People You Meet in Heaven	December 5, 2004

=== 2005 ===
Title	Premiere date
Dynasty: The Making of a Guilty Pleasure	January 2, 2005
Their Eyes Were Watching God	March 6, 2005
The Muppets' Wizard of Oz	May 20, 2005

=== 2006 ===
Title	Premiere date
Fatal Contact: Bird Flu in America	May 9, 2006
Stephen King's Desperation	May 23, 2006

== See also ==
- List of films produced by American Broadcasting Company
- List of production companies owned by the American Broadcasting Company
- American Broadcasting-Paramount Theatres
- Television film
- Disney anthology television series (list of episodes)
- The ABC Sunday Night Movie
- ABC Movie of the Week
- The ABC Saturday Superstar Movie
- ABC Afterschool Special
- ABC Theater
- ABC Weekend Special
- The ABC Mystery Movie (list of episodes)
- ABC Saturday Movie of the Week
