= Greg Prange =

American film editor, television director and producer

- Born: Gregory Prange
- Occupations: Film editor, television director and producer
- Years active: 1977–present

Gregory Prange is an American film editor, television director and producer. He did production work on One Tree Hill and Dawson's Creek.

== Career ==
Prange has held positions on One Tree Hill, Dawson's Creek, Dying to Belong, French Silk and various other director and editorial roles.

== Personal life ==
Greg Prange is the father of Ian Prange whose ex-partner was Hilarie Burton. Both Burton and Prange are heavily connected to the One Tree Hill TV series.

== Awards and nominations ==
Prange was nominated for an ALMA Award in 2001 for Outstanding Director of a Drama Series. The nomination was for his directing role in Dawson's Creek. He also received a nomination for a Primetime Emmy Award in 1988 for Outstanding Editing for a Miniseries or a Special - Single Camera Production. The Emmy nomination was for To Heal a Nation and was shared with Millie Moore.

== Filmography ==
Selected filmography

=== Director ===
| Year | Title | Notes |
|---|---|---|
| 1984 | Invitation to Hell | second unit director |
| 1984 | Obsessive Love | second unit director |
| 1985 | Wildside | second unit director, Episode "Until the Fat Lady Sings" |
| 1986 | Airwolf | Episode "Desperate Monday" |
| 1986 | One More Saturday Night | second unit director |
| 1992 | Going to Extremes | Episode "Sexual Perversity in Jantique" |
| 1996 | Flipper | Episode "Surf Gang" |
| 1999-2003 | Dawson's Creek | 16 episodes |
| 2003–2012 | One Tree Hill | 31 episodes |
| 2013 | Necessary Roughness | Episode "Sucker Punch" |
| 2015–2016 | Rizzoli & Isles | 6 episodes |
| 2017 | Criminal Minds: Beyond Borders | Episode "Pretty Like Me" |
| 2017 | No Tomorrow | Episode "No Time Like the Present" |
| 2017-2018 | Salvation | Episodes "The Wormwood Prophecy" and "Let the Chips Fall" |
| 2017-2018 | Valor | Episodes "About-Face" and "Costs of War" |
| 2019 | The Gifted | Episode "eneMy of My eneMy" |

=== Producer ===
- Young Americans
- Fantasy Island

=== Editor ===
| Year | Title | Notes |
|---|---|---|
| 1977 | Tabitha | Episode "The Pilot" |
| 1978-1979 | How The West Was Won | 14 episodes |
| 1979 | The Gift | |
| 1980 | Fantasy Island | Episode "Eagleman/Children of Mentu" |
| 1980 | Act of Love | |
| 1981 | Cagney & Lacey | Episode "Pilot" |
| 1982 | Marian Rose White | |
| 1983 | Baby Sister | |
| 1983 | Night Partners | |
| 1984 | Invitation to Hell | |
| 1984 | The Bear | additional editor |
| 1984 | The Three Wishes of Billy Grier | |
| 1984 | I Married a Centerfold | |
| 1985 | Romance on the Orient Express | post-production supervisor |
| 1985 | Wildside | supervising editor |
| 1986 | Armed and Dangerous | |
| 1986 | One More Saturday Night | |
| 1986 | Eye of the Tiger | |
| 1987 | Roses Are for the Rich | |
| 1988 | To Heal a Nation | |
| 1990 | The Great Los Angeles Earthquake | |
