= Hit Lady =

1974 television film directed by Tracy Keenan Wynn

- Promotional ad for Hit lady
- Genre: Action; Drama; Thriller
- Written by: Yvette Mimieux
- Directed by: Tracy Keenan Wynn
- Starring: Yvette Mimieux
- Music by: George Aliceson Tipton
- Country of origin: United States
- Original language: English

Production
- Producers: Leonard Goldberg; Aaron Spelling
- Production locations: 20th Century Fox Studios - 10201 Pico Blvd., Century City, Los Angeles
- Cinematography: Tim Southcott
- Editor: Sidney Levin
- Running time: 72 minutes
- Production company: Spelling-Goldberg Productions

Original release
- Network: ABC
- Release: October 8, 1974

Hit Lady is a 1974 made-for-TV film which aired on October 8, 1974. Starring Yvette Mimieux as artist and assassin Angela de Vries, it was written by Mimieux and directed by Tracy Keenan Wynn.

== Plot ==
A seductive woman shows up at a ranch party and takes a ride with the rancher. But she's actually Angela, an assassin, and he is her latest assignment, a minor drug lord. Returning home after the kill, she resumes her cover as a professional artist. Her photographer boyfriend Doug arrives but their reunion is interrupted by an urgent phone call.

The next day, she goes to the penthouse of Roarke, her employer. He demands that she fulfill one more contract hit, on union leader Jeffrey Baine. She wants $125,000 for this, her final job.

She goes to Doug's apartment, where they argue about money. She wants to give him money to help launch his photography career, but he refuses.

Angela stakes out and researches Baine in order to learn his weaknesses. She goes to a musical recital that Baine is attending and he invites her to dinner. They dance through the night afterward. In the morning, Baine's security chief Eddy wants to run a check on Angela.

Roarke and Angela meet again and she realizes that Roarke will never let her free.

Angela continues to make Baine fall in love with her to set up the kill. Doug calls to be with her, but when she says she's going out of town, he becomes suspicious. Angela and Baine go to a lakeside resort after ditching his chauffeur. With Baine's disappearance and Angela's address not checking out, Eddie is concerned. He searches Angela's house and finds multiple passports as well as her dossier on Baine.

Angela and Baine take a rowboat out on a lake, then she pushes him overboard. Baine can't swim and pleads for help. After some hesitation, she jumps in and rescues him, realizing that she no longer wants to kill.

Returning home, she sees Eddie's car parked outside. She calls Roarke for help as she can't leave the country without a passport. When she arrives for the pickup, Roarke's man tries to kill her. She manages to escape and goes to Roarke's penthouse, where she kills him without a word.

At the airport, she calls Doug and asks him to meet her at a hotel in Cozumel. He's puzzled but agrees. She spends idyllic days at the hotel before Doug arrives. She confesses her true profession. Doug is disbelieving and shocked.

The following day on the beach, Doug reveals that he's actually another of Roarke's proteges, and she is his assignment. She tells him Roarke is dead and there's no need to kill her, but he doesn't believe her. He shoots her as she tries to flee, then leaves her body on the sand.

== Cast ==
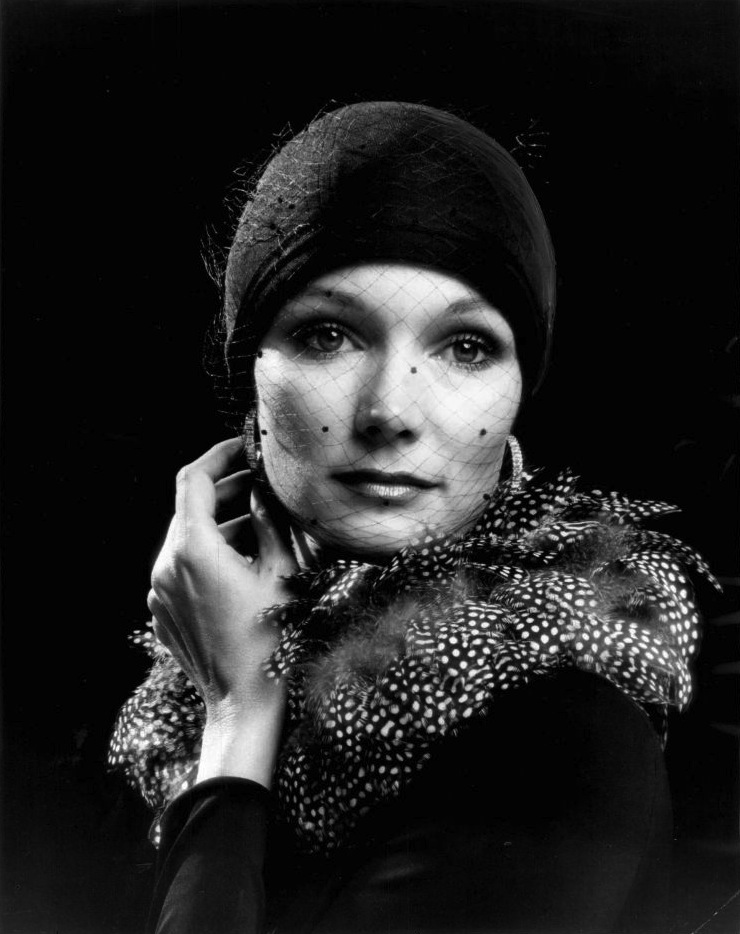
Yvette Mimieux in a publicity photo for the film

- Yvette Mimieux as Angela de Vries
- Joseph Campanella as Jeffrey Baine
- Clu Gulager as Roarke
- Dack Rambo as Doug Reynolds
- Keenan Wynn as Buddy McCormack
- Roy Jenson as Eddie
- Paul George as Webb
- Del Monroe as Hansen

== Production ==
Hit Lady was written by Mimieux, and directed by Tracy Keenan Wynn.

=== Development ===
By the early 1970s Mimieux was well established as an actor but was unhappy with the roles offered to female actors. "The women they [male screenwriters] write are all one dimensional," she said. "They have no complexity in their lives. It's all surface. There's nothing to play. They're either sex objects or vanilla pudding."

Mimieux had been writing for several years prior to this film, mostly journalism and short stories. She had the idea for a story about a Pirandello-like theme, "the study of a woman, the difference between what she appears to be and what she is: appearance vs reality." Mimieux says the more she thought about the character "the more I wanted to play her. Here was the kind of nifty, multifaceted part I'd been looking for. So instead of a short story, I wrote it as a film."

She wrote a thriller called Counterpoint about a female killer who used her attractive appearance to get close to her victims. She said the character was "not... a good housewife or sex object. The character I wrote is like an onion, layers upon layers, multi-facted, interesting, desirable, manipulative... It's about what people are saying to each other and what they mean."

Mimieux had appeared in two TV movies, Black Noon and Death Takes a Holiday, so took her script to producers Aaron Spelling and Leonard Goldberg who submitted it to ABC as a TV movie. The network wanted some changes. "I created a totally amoral creature who killed people like you'd swat a fly, with no remorse, no regret," said Mimieux. "That was a little too strong for the network. So they made me soften her." They also insisted the script be retitled from Counterpoint to Hit Lady.

Tracy Keenan Wynn was the son of Keenan Wynn and grandson of Ed Wynn. He had developed a strong reputation as a screenwriter, his credits including The Longest Yard, The Glass House and The Autobiography of Miss Jane Pittman. This allowed him to make his directorial debut with this film. His father Keenan made a cameo appearance as he wanted to be the first actor ever directed by his son. (It would be the only film he ever directed.)

== Broadcast and reception ==
Hit Lady first aired on ABC on October 8, 1974 as part of its ABC Movie of the Week anthology series. It was one of the highest-rated and most talked about TV movies of 1974.

The Los Angeles Times called it a "tightly structured, richly textured melodrama".

The movie was repeated in June 1975.
