= Ransom for Alice! =

1977 American television film

- Genre: Drama; Thriller; Western
- Written by: Jim Byrnes
- Directed by: David Lowell Rich
- Starring: Gil Gerard; Yvette Mimieux
- Music by: David Rose
- Country of origin: United States
- Original language: English

Production
- Producer: Franklin Barton
- Cinematography: Jacques R. Marquette
- Editor: Sam E. Waxman
- Running time: 78 minutes
- Production company: Universal Television

Original release
- Network: NBC
- Release: June 2, 1977

Ransom for Alice! is a 1977 American Western television film directed by David Lowell Rich and starring Gil Gerard and Yvette Mimieux.

The Los Angeles Times called it "pleasant rather than riveting".

== Plot ==
In 1890s Seattle, a deputy marshal and his female partner set out to bust up a ring that kidnaps teenage girls and sells them into prostitution.

== Cast ==
- Gil Gerard as Clint Kirby
- Yvette Mimieux as Jenny Cullen
- Charles Napier as Pete Phelan
- Laurie Prange as Alice Halliday
- Barnard Hughes as Jess Halliday
- Gavin MacLeod as Yankee Sullivan
- Gene Barry as Harry Darew
- Harris Yulin as Isaac Pratt
- Mills Watson as Toby
- John Durren as Johnson
- Robert Hogan as Whitaker Halliday
- Marc Vahanian as Nick Vithanian
- Anthony James as James
- Virginia Wood as Mrs. Purcell
- Tony Burton as Fish Man
- Kory Lynn as Young Girl
- Claude Johnson as Sergeant Malloy
- Larry Watson as Guard #1
- Barbara Sanford as Hooker #2
