= Lynn Loring =

American actress and producer (1943–2023)

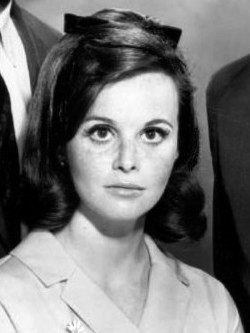
- Loring in a 1965 publicity photo for The F.B.I.
- Born: Lynn Eileen Zimring; July 14, 1943; Manhattan, New York, U.S.
- Died: December 23, 2023 (aged 80); Tarzana, California, U.S.
- Occupations: Actress, producer
- Years active: 1951–93
- Spouse(s): Roy Thinnes (m. 1967; div. 1984) Michael Bergman (m. 1988)
- Children: 2

Lynn Loring (born Lynn Eileen Zimring; July 14, 1943 – December 23, 2023) was an American actress and television and film producer.

== Career ==
Born Lynn Eileen Zimring in Manhattan, Loring began acting with a role on the anthology series Studio One on CBS. In 1951, at the age of seven, she played Patti Barron in the television soap opera Search for Tomorrow. She remained in the role for 10 years, until she graduated from high school in 1961, after which she explored other opportunities, including appearances in films including Splendor in the Grass (1961) and Pressure Point (1962). She played the title character's daughter in The Jean Carroll Show (1953) on ABC. In 1962, she also played beatnik Edwina "Eddie" Kegel, the romantic interest of Maynard G. Krebs in two episodes of The Many Loves of Dobie Gillis.

In 1963, she portrayed Patty Walker, a girl who, due to her wanting to study drama in London, lived with the family of her father's wartime best friend, while the friend's daughter lived with Patty's family in New York, in the comedy series Fair Exchange. Also in 1963, she guest starred as Maybelle in the "Pa Hack's Brood" episode of Gunsmoke. Loring played Susan Foster in the 1964 episode "The Case of the Paper Bullets" on Perry Mason. Also in 1964, she played Filene in the "Memo from Purgatory" episode of The Alfred Hitchcock Hour as well as Bonnie Daniels in the "Behind the Locked Door" episode of the same series. In 1965, she played the hellion outlaw Maybelle Williams in "Judgement in Heaven", the Christmas episode of the Western series The Big Valley.

Loring played Barbara Erskine, the daughter of Inspector Lewis Erskine (Efrem Zimbalist Jr.), during the first season (1965-1966) of The F.B.I. In 1966, she played an artist Carma Vasquez in "The Night of the Flaming Ghost" episode of The Wild Wild West and guest-starred as Laurie Ferguson in "Something Hurt, Something Wild", the first episode of the eighth season of Bonanza. In 1967, she guest-starred in two episodes of The Man from U.N.C.L.E., "The Deadly Smorgasboard Affair" and "The Test-Tube Killer Affair". Other television work included playing Betty Anderson Harrington in Return to Peyton Place, as well as roles on Wagon Train, The Eleventh Hour, Daniel Boone, Bonanza, and The Mod Squad. In 1970, she guest-starred in Season 2, Episode 3, entitled "The Shadow of a Dead Man" on Lancer, having previously guest starred in the Season 1 episode, "Foley".

In 1975, she discontinued acting in favor of a career in production, of both made-for-TV movies and feature films, such as Mr. Mom (1983). In 1979, Loring worked as the casting director for a TV movie, Raid on Coffeyville. She shifted into producing, and for several years had an initially fruitful partnership with Aaron Spelling. In the late 1980s, she was named president of MGM/UA Television Productions.

== Personal life and death ==
Loring was married to actor Roy Thinnes from 1967 to 1984, when they divorced. They have a son, Christopher Dylan Thinnes, and a daughter, Casey-Leigh Thinnes. In 1967, Loring appeared with Thinnes in the episode "Panic" of The Invaders. Thinnes and Loring played husband and wife in both the 1969 feature film Journey to the Far Side of the Sun (original title: Doppelgänger), and in the 1971 TV movie Black Noon. They also appeared together in the TV horror film The Horror at 37,000 Feet (1973).

Loring wed Michael Bergman, an attorney, in 1988. She died at the Providence Cedars-Sinai Tarzana Medical Center in Tarzana, California, on December 23, 2023, at the age of 80.

== Filmography ==
Year	Title	Role	Notes
1961	Splendor in the Grass	Carolyn	
1962	Pressure Point	Jewish Girl	
1964	Daniel Boone	Tekawitha McLeod	Season 1 Episode 2
1964	The Alfred Hitchcock Hour	Bonnie Daniels / Filene	Season 2 Episode 22 & Season 3 Episode 10
1969	Doppelgänger	Sharon Ross	
1971	Black Noon	Lorna Keyes	TV movie
1973	The Horror at 37,000 Feet	Manya	TV movie
1975	The Kansas City Massacre	Vi Morland	TV movie
