= Roy Thinnes =

American actor (born 1938)

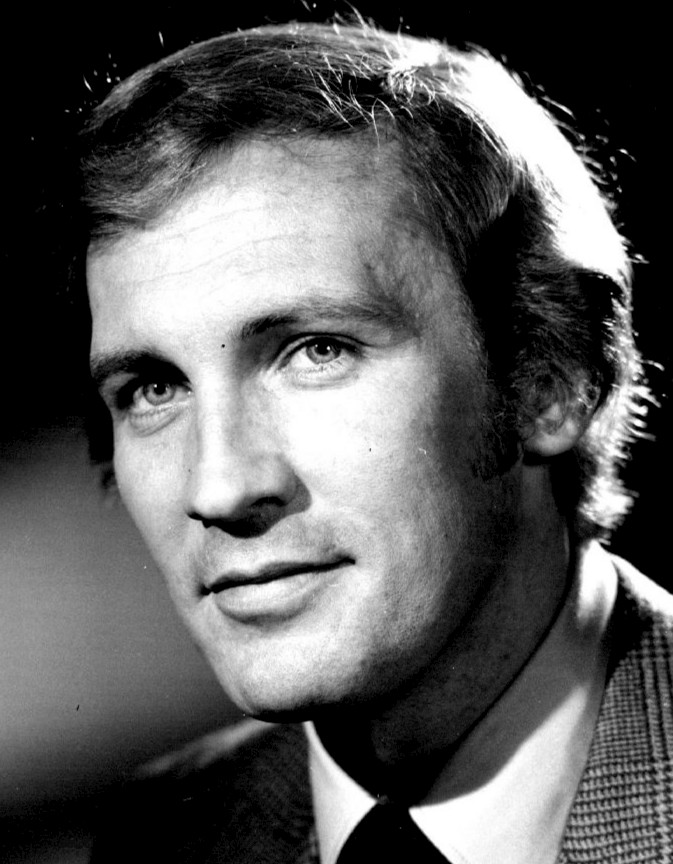
- Thinnes in 1971
- Born: April 6, 1938 (age 88); Chicago, Illinois, U.S.
- Occupation: Actor
- Years active: 1957–2007
- Spouses: Barbara Ainslee (m. 1962; div. 1967) Lynn Loring (m. 1967; div. 1984) Katherine Smythe (m. 1987; div. 2001) Stephanie Batailler (m. 2005)
- Children: 5

Roy Thinnes (/ˈθɪnɛs/; born April 6, 1938) is an American former television and film actor best known for his portrayal of lonely hero David Vincent in the ABC 1967–68 television series The Invaders.

He starred in the 1969 British science fiction film Doppelgänger (a.k.a. Journey to the Far Side of the Sun outside Britain), and also played Manhattan District Attorney Alfred Wentworth in the pilot episode of Law & Order.

== Biography ==
Thinnes was born in Chicago of German descent. After serving in the United States Army as a military policeman, he relocated to California and attended Los Angeles City College.

== Career ==
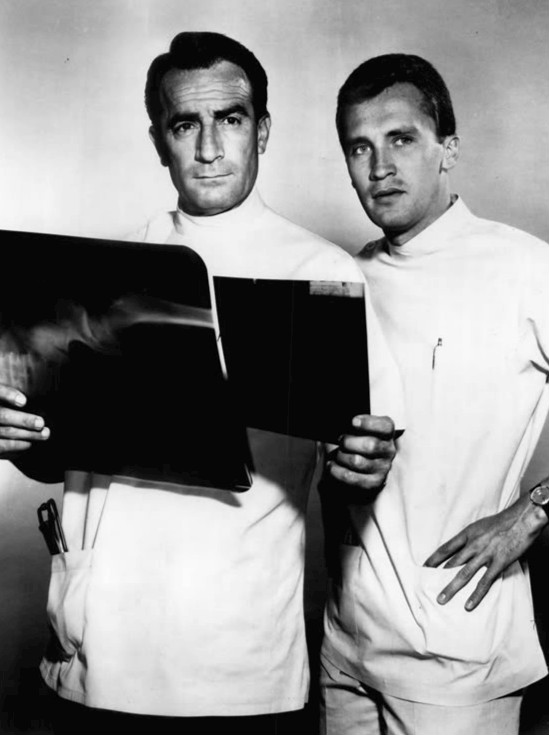
Thinnes as Phil Brewer with John Beradino in General Hospital, 1964

=== Early roles ===
His first primetime role was in "A Fist of Five", a 1962 episode of Quinn Martin's The Untouchables, as a brother of an ex-policeman (played by Lee Marvin). Later that year he appeared in a small role as a cowboy named "Harry" on James Arness's TV Western Gunsmoke ("False Front" - S8E15).

He appeared on General Hospital as the "philandering Dr. Phil Brewer" from 1963 to 1965, which was later described as "Thinnes' big break."

In 1964, he guested twice in episodes "Murder by Scandal" and the "Lost Lady Blues" of the 13-episode CBS drama The Reporter. Thinnes guest starred on another Quinn Martin series, Twelve O'Clock High produced by 20th Century Fox Television, becoming a casualty of war while commanding a B-17 bomber on a dangerous mission.

Later he co-starred as Ben Quick in the short-lived 1965-66 20th Century Fox Television series The Long Hot Summer, which ran on ABC. During its run he received around 1,500 letters per week and appeared on the cover of TV Guide.

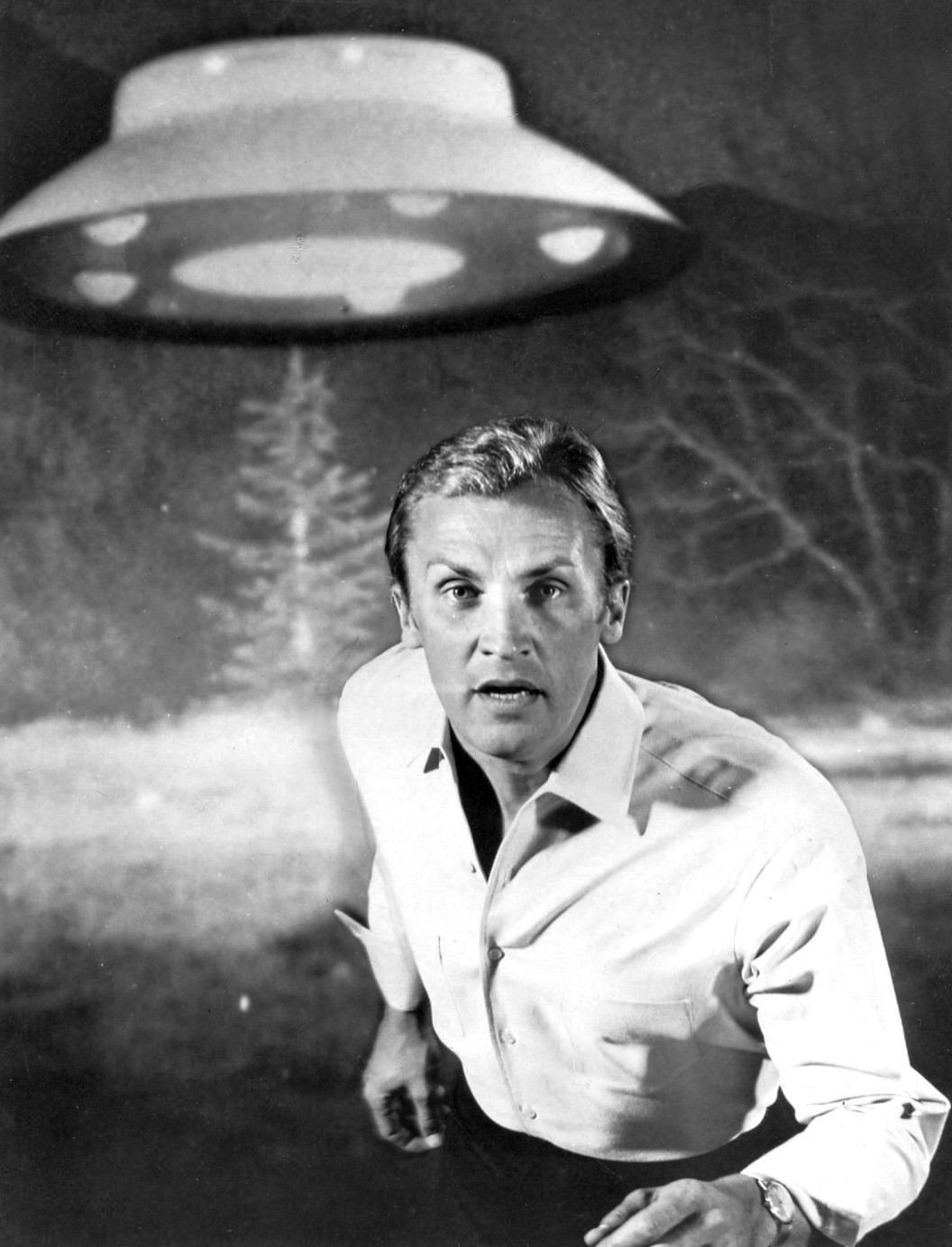
Roy Thinnes in The Invaders, 1966

=== The Invaders ===
During 1967 and 1968, Thinnes starred in The Invaders, a TV series in which he portrayed an architect named David Vincent who accidentally witnessed the arrival of aliens from another planet. Vincent waged a seemingly hopeless one-man campaign against them. The series became a cult classic, leading to other 'aliens vs earthlings' films and TV shows.

His then-future second wife, actress Lynn Loring, appeared in the show's 14th episode, "The Panic".

Decades after the unexpected cancellation of the original series, he returned in 1995 as a much older David Vincent, as part of the TV mini-series revival The Invaders (starring Scott Bakula), and a decade later provided audio commentary for the official DVD releases of The Invaders.

The Washington Post noted in 2008 that, although The Invaders "ran for just two seasons ... in 2004, TV Guide placed main character David Vincent at #6 on its 25 Greatest Sci-Fi Legends list."

In 2019, American basic-cable network MeTV began running weekly reruns of The Invaders as part of its popular "Red-Eye Sci-Fi Saturday Night" overnight late Saturday evening and early Sunday morning sci-fi TV series programming schedule.

=== Post-Invaders ===
In another short-lived series, Thinnes had the lead role on The Psychiatrist as Dr. James Whitman.

Manhunter (in which Thinnes tracks a bank robbery suspect) is a TV film that was broadcast on British TV in 1972 (with The Man Hunter as its title) but was not shown on American TV until 1976. A similar title ("The Manhunter"), but with a different plot, was used for a 1974-filmed TV movie. He played writer and investigator of the supernatural David Norliss in 1973's The Norliss Tapes, a pilot for an unproduced TV series, and portrayed a suspicious schoolmaster in the TV movie Satan's School for Girls.

He appeared in the disaster films Airport 1975 as the co-pilot, and The Hindenburg as a sadistic SS captain. Thinnes was cast in Alfred Hitchcock's 1976 film Family Plot in the role of nefarious jeweler Arthur Adamson when Hitchcock's first choice, William Devane, was unavailable. Thinnes had already shot several scenes for the film when Devane suddenly became available. Hitchcock fired Thinnes and re-shot all of his scenes. He confronted Hitchcock in a restaurant and asked the director why he was fired. Flabbergasted, Hitchcock simply looked at Thinnes until the actor left. Some shots of Thinnes as the character (from behind) remain in the film.

Thinnes appeared in the 1979 miniseries From Here to Eternity as Captain Dana Holmes.

During the 1982–1983 season, Thinnes appeared as Nick Hogan in 35 episodes of Falcon Crest. He later played Roger Collins in the 1991 revival of TV's Dark Shadows. He appeared on One Life to Live as Alex Crown from 1984 to 1985, and as Sloan Carpenter from 1992 to 1995. He also played a lead role in "The Final Chapter," the first episode of the 1977 series Quinn Martin's Tales of the Unexpected (known in the United Kingdom as Twist in the Tale), and in "The Crystal Scarab", a first-season episode of Poltergeist: The Legacy in 1996. Thinnes was once considered by Paramount for the part of Jean-Luc Picard in Star Trek: The Next Generation.

He appeared in the 1988 pilot episode of Law & Order, "Everybody's Favorite Bagman", as district attorney Alfred Wentworth. By the time the show was picked up in 1990, however, Thinnes was contractually obligated to Dark Shadows, and so his character was replaced with district attorney Adam Schiff, played by Steven Hill. Thinnes made two appearances in The X-Files as Jeremiah Smith, an alien rebel with healing and shape-shifting abilities.

Twice Thinnes appeared on the ABC soap opera One Life to Live playing two different characters. From 1984 to 1985, he played the role of "Alex Crown" and from 1992 to 1995, he played the role of "Gen. Sloan Carpenter". During both of his stints on the show, his characters became a father-in-law to the same character, Cassie Callison.

In 2005, Thinnes co-starred as Dr. Theophile Peyron in the movie The Eyes of Van Gogh about Vincent van Gogh (played by Alexander Barnett, who also wrote and directed) and his voluntary stay in an insane asylum. The movie focuses on Van Gogh's relationships with Dr. Peyron, as well as fellow expressionist Paul Gauguin, and his brother, Theo.

== Personal life ==
He was married to actress Lynn Loring from 1967 to 1984. Loring gave birth to their son Christopher Dylan Thinnes on Feb. 12 1969, and in 1974 gave birth to their daughter Casey Thinnes.

Thinnes's third wife, actress Catherine Smythe, is the mother of two of his five children.

In 2005, Thinnes married film editor Stephanie Batailler.

== Filmography ==
=== Film ===
Year	Title	Role	Notes
1959	The FBI Story	Party Guest	Uncredited
1969	Journey to the Far Side of the Sun	Colonel Glen Ross	
1973	Charley One-Eye	The Indian	
1974	Airport 1975	Urias	
1975	The Hindenburg	SS/Gestapo Hauptsturmführer Martin Vogel	
1987	Mind Benders	Principal Borden	
1989	Rush Week	Dean Grail	
2001	A Beautiful Mind	Governor	
2005	The Eyes of Van Gogh	Dr. Peyron	
2006	Undone		
2006	Spectropia	Franklin DeMott	
2007	Broken English	Peter Andrews	

=== Television ===
Year	Title	Role	Notes
1957	Cavalcade of America	Mickey Hubbard	Episode: "Chicago 2-1-2"
1958	Peter Gunn	Roy Davidson	Episode: "The Man with the Scar"
1959	Steve Canyon	Officer Weber	Episode: "Room 313"
1962	The Untouchables	Denny Brannon	Episode: "A Fist of Five"
1962	Gunsmoke	Harry	Episode: "False Front"
1963	Ripcord	Radioman	Episode: "Semper Paratus Any Time"
1963	The Untouchables	Red Thomas	Episode: "An Eye for an Eye"
1963	The Eleventh Hour	David Dunlear	Episode: "Something Crazy's Going on in the Back Room"
1963	Death Valley Days	Jim	Episode: "Shadow of Violence"
1963	Gunsmoke	Ab Singleton	Episode: "Jeb"
1963–1965	General Hospital	Dr. Phil Brewer	Series regular
1964	The Reporter	Roberts	Episode: "Murder by Scandal"
1964	The Reporter	Detective Lieutenant Lee Roberts	Episode: "The Lost Lady Blues"
1965–1966	The Long, Hot Summer	Ben Quick	Main cast 26 episodes
1965	12 O'Clock High	Maj. Jake Hays	Episode: "In Search of My Enemies"
1966	The F.B.I.	Larry Drake	Episode: "The Escape"
1966	12 O'Clock High	Capt. Paul Pridie	Episode: "A Distant Cry"
1966	The Fugitive	Carl Crandall	Episode: "Wine is a Traitor"
1967–1968	The Invaders	David Vincent	Lead role 43 episodes
1970	The Other Man	Johnny Brant	TV movie
1970–1971	The Psychiatrist	Dr. James Whitman	Lead role Seven episodes
1971	Black Noon	Reverend John Keyes	TV movie
1972	The Manhunter	David Farrow	TV movie
1973	The Horror at 37,000 Feet	Alan O'Neill	TV movie
1973	The Norliss Tapes	David Norliss	TV movie
1973	Satan's School for Girls	Dr. Joseph Clampett	TV movie
1973	Death Race	Arnold McMillan	TV movie
1977	Quinn Martin's Tales of the Unexpected	Frank Harris	Episode: "The Final Chapter"
1977	Secrets	Herb Fleming	TV movie
1977	Code Name: Diamond Head	Johnny Paul	TV movie
1978	Battlestar Galactica	Croft	Two episodes
1979	From Here to Eternity	Capt. Dana Holmes	Miniseries
1979	Supertrain	Senator J. J. Phillips/Eddie Barnes	Episode: "Hail to the Chief"
1979	The Return of Mod Squad	Dan	TV movie
1979	Stone	Detective Cliff Bell	Episode: "Pilot"
1980	From Here to Eternity	Capt. Dana Holmes	Main cast 11 episodes
1981	Freedom	Michael	TV movie
1981	Scruples	Bennett Hall	TV movie
1981	Sizzle	Wheeler	TV movie
1982–1983	Falcon Crest	Nick Hogan	Recurring role 20 episodes
1984	Hotel	John White	Episode: "Memories"
1984	The Love Boat	Buzz McClaine	Episode: "Country Blues/A Matter of Taste/Frat Brothers Forever"
1984–1985	One Life to Live	Alex Crown	Series regular
1985	Murder, She Wrote	Lt. Ted Misko	Episode: "Dead Heat"
1986	Highway to Heaven	Howard Sellers	Episode: "Oh Lucky Man"
1987	1st & Ten	Teddy Schrader	Recurring role Six episodes
1987	Murder, She Wrote	Sheriff Howard Landry	Episode: "Trouble in Eden"
1987	The Law & Harry McGraw	George Bellamy	Episode: "State of Art"
1989	Dark Holiday	Jimmy	TV movie
1990	Blue Bayou	Barry Fontenot	TV movie
1990	War of the Worlds	Van Order	Episode: "Video Messiah"
1990	Law & Order	D.A. Alfred Wentworth	Episode: "Everybody's Favorite Bagman"
1991	An Inconvenient Woman	Sims Lord	Miniseries
1991	Murder, She Wrote	J.K. Davern	Episode: "The Taxman Cometh"
1991	Dark Shadows	Roger Collins/Rev. Trask	Main cast 12 episodes
1991	P.S. I Luv U	Larry Benton	Episode: "The Honeymooners"
1992	Lady Against the Odds	P.L. Storrs	TV movie
1992	FBI: The Untold Stories	Agent Jim Theisen	Episode; "D.B. Cooper/The McCoy Hijacking"
1992	Stormy Weathers	Andrew Chase	TV movie
1992–1995	One Life to Live	Gen. Sloan Carpenter	Series regular
1995	Walker, Texas Ranger	Col. Dayton	Episode: "Case Closed"
1995	The Invaders	David Vincent	Miniseries
1996	Terminal	John Cabot	TV movie
1996–2001	The X-Files	Jeremiah Smith	Recurring role Three episodes
1996	Poltergeist: The Legacy	Clayton Wallace	Episode: "The Crystal Scarab"
1996	Touched by an Angel	Senator Guy Hammond	Episode: "Secret Service"
1997	Law & Order	Victor Panatti	Episode: "Terminal"
1997	Players	Logan Cates	Episode: "Con Job"
1999	Law & Order	Mr Kushner	Episode: "Ramparts"
2000	The Sopranos	Dr. Baumgartner	Episode: "House Arrest"
2000	D.C.	Fred Hamilton	Episode: "Guns and Roses"
2000	Bar Hopping	Man with Cassandra	TV movie
2001	Law & Order: Criminal Intent	Sheridan Beckworth	Episode: "The Faithful"
2002	Oz	Leader of Aryan Brotherhood	Episode: "Good Intentions"
2002	Law & Order: Special Victims Unit	Curtis Johansen	Episode: "Greed"
2006	Conviction	Ralph Hanlon	Episode: "Deliverance"
