= Monkeys, Go Home! =

1967 film directed by Andrew V. McLaglen

- Theatrical release poster
- Directed by: Andrew V. McLaglen
- Screenplay by: Maurice Tombragel
- Based on: The Monkeys by G.K. Wilkinson
- Produced by: Walt Disney
- Starring: Maurice Chevalier; Yvette Mimieux; Dean Jones
- Cinematography: William E. Snyder
- Edited by: Marsh Hendry
- Music by: Robert F. Brunner
- Production company: Walt Disney Productions
- Distributed by: Buena Vista Distribution
- Release date: February 8, 1967 (San Francisco)
- Running time: 101 minutes
- Country: United States
- Language: English
- Box office: $3,000,000 (US/ Canada)

Monkeys, Go Home! is a 1967 American comedy film directed by Andrew V. McLaglen and produced by Walt Disney Productions. Based on the novel The Monkeys by G.K. Wilkinson, the film was written by Maurice Tombragel, and stars Maurice Chevalier, Dean Jones, and Yvette Mimieux. Aside from contributing to the soundtrack of Disney's animated film The Aristocats (1970), this was Chevalier's final film role.

Released on February 8, 1967, this was the first feature-length film released by Walt Disney Productions since its namesake founder's death nearly two months earlier.

== Plot ==
Hank Dussard (Jones), the new owner of an olive grove in Provence, France, brings in trained chimpanzee labor, which upsets the local labor leaders who conspire to bankrupt him, first by preventing the only regional buyer of olives from purchasing monkey-picked olives, then by producing a (probably fraudulent) cousin who by dint of her relationship would own half the farm, half the olives, and half the monkeys.

Maria Riserau (Mimieux), an attractive neighbor who works in a local perfume factory, is attracted to Dussard and manages to scare away the "cousin" by convincing her that the chimpanzees are ghosts, haunting the farmhouse.

Championed by kindly Father Sylvain (Chevalier), Dussard wins the support of the townspeople by offering to have the chimps pick all the olives on every farm for free, thus increasing their profits. This plan fails when the chimps, who are all female, are distracted by a male chimpanzee purchased by the perfume-workers. The townspeople forgive Dussard his failure and he pairs up with Riserau as the credit roll.

== Cast ==
- Maurice Chevalier as Father Sylvain
- Dean Jones as Hank Dussard
- Yvette Mimieux as Maria Riserau
- Bernard Woringer as Marcel Cartucci
- Clément Harari as Emile Paurilis
- Yvonne Constant as Yolande Angelli
- Marcel Hillaire as Mayor Gaston Lou
- Jules Munshin as Monsieur Piastillio
- Alan Carney as Grocer
- Maurice Marsac as Fontanino
- Darleen Carr as Sidoni Riserau

== Reception ==
Vincent Canby of The New York Times called it "another of those bland little confections turned out regularly by the Disney studio". Arthur D. Murphy of Variety declared it "an amusing comedy-romance" with "the usual professional Disney blend of children, animals, humor and charm". Kevin Thomas of the Los Angeles Times called it "a typical Disney family film". The Monthly Film Bulletin wrote: "Olive farming certainly provides an unusual background, but otherwise all is innocuous, extrovertly cheerful and good-humoured—and very dull."
