= Disaster on the Coastliner =

1979 American television film

- a movie poster showing helicopters and two men climbing on the Amtrak EMD F40PH locomotive.
- Genre: Action; Drama
- Written by: David Ambrose
- Directed by: Richard C. Sarafian
- Starring: Lloyd Bridges; Raymond Burr; Robert Fuller; Pat Hingle; E. G. Marshall; Yvette Mimieux; William Shatner; Paul L. Smith
- Theme music composer: Gerald Fried
- Country of origin: United States
- Original language: English

Production
- Producer: Frank von Zerneck
- Production locations: East Lyme, Connecticut; Groton, Connecticut
- Cinematography: Fred J. Koenekamp
- Editor: Robert Florio
- Running time: 96 minutes
- Production companies: Filmways Television; Moonlight Productions

Original release
- Network: ABC
- Release: October 28, 1979

Disaster on the Coastliner is a 1979 American made-for-television action drama film. It was directed by Richard C. Sarafian and starred Lloyd Bridges, Raymond Burr, Robert Fuller, Pat Hingle, E. G. Marshall, Yvette Mimieux, William Shatner, and Paul L. Smith. It originally aired on The ABC Sunday Night Movie on October 28, 1979.

== Plot ==
A disgruntled railroad employee attempts to cause a collision between two passenger trains.

== Cast ==
- Lloyd Bridges as Al Mitchell
- Raymond Burr as Estes Hill
- Robert Fuller as Matt Leigh
- Pat Hingle as John Marsh
- E. G. Marshall as Roy Snyder
- Yvette Mimieux as Paula Harvey
- William Shatner as Stuart Peters
- Paul L. Smith as Jim Waterman / Victor Prescott
- Lane Smith as John Carlson
- Sandy McPeak as Hennessey
- Michael Pataki as Tate
- Peter Jason as LeBoux
- John Brady as Locomotive Engineer
- Dago Dimster as Davy

== Production ==
The film was shot on a railway line in Connecticut. At his own suggestion William Shatner did his own stunts, including standing on top of a moving F40PH. Years later Shatner called the stunt "the most truly dangerous stunt I ever did" and couldn't imagine "what [he] was thinking" in suggesting it. Shatner compared it to the work he'd done in Kingdom of the Spiders, and wondered which was worse: "standing on top of a speeding locomotive without any kind of safety cable or gluing tarantulas to your face?" Jack Sessums worked on the miniature effects and had his work profiled in TV Guide.

== Release ==
Disaster on the Coastliner premiered on The ABC Sunday Night Movie on October 28, 1979. Although no DVD or VHS has been released in America, the movie's current owner, Metro-Goldwyn-Mayer, has made the movie available for streaming on Amazon Prime Video and Paramount plus in the United States. The movie aired on July 27, 2025 on FETV's Sunday Movie Matinee.

== See also ==
List of television films produced for American Broadcasting Company
