= Invitation to Hell (1984 film) =

- Promotional poster
- Genre: Horror; Sci-fi; Thriller
- Written by: Richard Rothstein
- Directed by: Wes Craven
- Starring: Robert Urich; Joanna Cassidy; Susan Lucci; Joe Regalbuto; Kevin McCarthy
- Theme music composer: Sylvester Levay
- Country of origin: United States
- Original language: English

Production
- Executive producer: Frank von Zerneck
- Producer: Robert M. Sertner
- Cinematography: Dean Cundey
- Editors: Ann E. Mills; Gregory Prange
- Running time: 95 minutes
- Production company: Moonlight Productions

Original release
- Network: ABC
- Release: May 24, 1984

Invitation to Hell is a 1984 American made-for-television supernatural horror film directed by Wes Craven, and starring Robert Urich, Joanna Cassidy, and Susan Lucci. Its plot follows a family who are pressured to join a mysterious country club in their new Southern California community. It was nominated for a Primetime Emmy for Art Direction in 1984.

== Plot ==
Matt Winslow moves with his wife, Patricia, and children, Chrissy and Robert, to an upper-middle class suburban neighborhood in Southern California from the midwest. Matt, an engineer, has taken a new job at Micro-DigiTech, a successful but secretive technology corporation housed in a large, windowed skyscraper near town. His new project entails a thermally-reinforced state-of-the-art space suit. Upon arriving, they are met by their friends, Mary and Tom Peterson, who also live in the community.

The Winslows are soon met by Jessica Jones, a local insurance agent and director of the Steaming Springs Country Club. At work, Grace, the secretary, attempts to give Matt a binder of secret information, and is replaced by a new secretary mere days later. Matt receives increasing pressure from his boss and peers to join the Steaming Springs club, which Tom and his family have already joined. The overt pressure to become members perturbs Matt, while Patricia suggests that they join, as it may help ensure Matt's professional success.

Patricia decides to join the club herself along with Chrissy and Robert; the three are admitted by Jessica in a ceremony in which they enter a mysterious mist-filled room, described by Jessica as "the spring." Matt receives a phone call from Grace's husband, Walt, a veterinarian, who informs Matt that Patricia brought the family's dog Albert to him, claiming it was violent and suffering from a brain tumor, and wanting it euthanized. After finding the dog had no medical problems, Walt kept the dog, lying to the insistent Patricia that he would euthanize it.

When Matt confronts Patricia—now donning a glamorous outfit similar to that of Jessica—about her attempt to have Albert euthanized, she grows manic and pleads with Matt to spend more time with her and the children. Matt is notably disturbed by his family's change in behavior, including that of the children. Later, Matt learns from Walt that Grace died in a mysterious car accident. On Halloween, while a party is occurring at the country club, Matt manages to break into the "spring," and uses a thermometer to find that the room is inhumanly hot. A security guard subsequently attacks him, but Matt kills him by electrocution.

Returning home, Matt finds Chrissy in a violent state; he locks her in a closet, but is attacked by an equally vicious Robert. Patricia appears and attacks Matt with a golf club, but he incapacitates her. Matt returns to DigiTech to retrieve his space suit, but is confronted by Tom, who threatens him with a pistol. Matt kills Tom using a laser gun built into the arm of the space suit.

Matt arrives at the party dressed in the space suit, which conceals his face; he presents himself as Tom, altering his voice. Jessica is immediately suspicious, and follows Matt as he sneaks into the spring. Using a flamethrower function of the suit, Matt encircles Jessica in fire before entering the spring. Inside, he finds the temperature rising to excesses of 2,000 degrees Fahrenheit; he soon realizes he has entered hell. Matt leaps from a precipice toward a cityscape below, where he finds himself in an alternate dimension that is a doppelgänger for Steaming Springs. In his house, he finds Patricia madly playing piano. Jessica informs Matt that his entire family is locked within a force field and cannot leave. Matt defiantly removes his suit and enters the force fields surrounding his family, which he is able to do as his actions are out of pure love; this enrages Jessica, who explodes in a beam of light.

Matt and his family awaken in their house, back on earth. Outside, the streets are filled with sirens, and neighbors inform them that the country club has burned to the ground. The family watch from the street as smoke rises from the hillside.

== Cast ==
- Robert Urich as Matthew "Matt" Winslow
- Joanna Cassidy as Patricia "Pat" Winslow
- Susan Lucci as Jessica Jones
- Joe Regalbuto as Tom Peterson
- Kevin McCarthy as Mr. Thompson
- Michael Berryman as Valet
- Patty McCormack as Mary Peterson
- Soleil Moon Frye as Chrissy Winslow
- Barret Oliver as Robert Winslow
- Bill Erwin as Walt Henderson
- Virginia Vincent as Grace Henderson
- Nicholas Worth as Sheriff
- Lois Hamilton as Miss Winter

== Production ==
Filming took place in Southern California, including Westlake Village, Simi Valley, Woodland Hills, and Culver City.
