= Death Takes a Holiday =

1934 US pre-Code romantic drama film by Mitchell Leisen

- Theatrical release poster
- Directed by: Mitchell Leisen
- Screenplay by: Maxwell Anderson; Gladys Lehman
- Based on: Death Takes a Holiday by Walter Ferris; La morte in vacanza by Alberto Casella
- Produced by: E. Lloyd Sheldon; Emanuel Cohen
- Starring: Fredric March; Evelyn Venable; Guy Standing; Katharine Alexander; Gail Patrick; Kent Taylor; Helen Westley; Henry Travers; Kathleen Howard
- Cinematography: Charles Lang
- Music by: Bernhard Kaun; John Leipold; Milan Roder
- Production company: Paramount Pictures
- Distributed by: Paramount Pictures
- Release date: February 23, 1934
- Running time: 79 minutes
- Country: United States
- Language: English

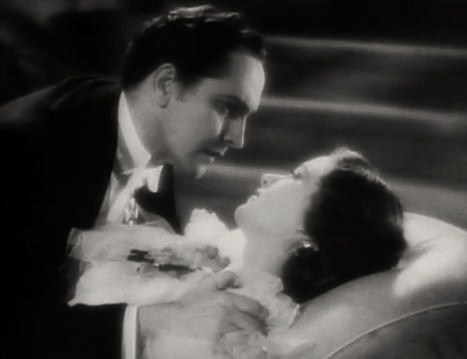
Fredric March and Evelyn Venable

Death Takes a Holiday is a 1934 American pre-Code romantic drama film directed by Mitchell Leisen and starring Fredric March, Evelyn Venable and Guy Standing. It is based on the 1924 Italian play La morte in vacanza by Alberto Casella (1891–1957), as adapted in English for Broadway in 1929 by Walter Ferris. The film received generally positive reviews from critics.

== Plot ==
After years of questioning why people fear him, Death takes on human form as Prince Sirki for three days so that he can mingle among mortals and find an answer. He finds a host in Duke Lambert after revealing himself and his intentions to the Duke, and he takes up temporary residence in the Duke's villa. However, Death falls in love with the beautiful young Grazia. As he does so, Duke Lambert, the father of Grazia's mortal lover Corrado, begs him to give Grazia up and leave her among the living.

Death is torn between seeking his own happiness or sacrificing it so that Grazia may live. After listening to the pleas from the Duke and his houseguests, Death finally decides to let Grazia live and returns to his true self, a black shadow. As he prepares to depart, Grazia chooses to go with him, telling him that she knew all along who he really was. Death then proclaims that love is greater than illusion and is as strong as death. He puts his arm around Grazia, and they both disappear in a flash of light.

== Cast ==
- Fredric March as Prince Sirki/Death
- Evelyn Venable as Grazia
- Guy Standing as Duke Lambert
- Katherine Alexander as Alda
- Gail Patrick as Rhoda
- Helen Westley as Stephanie
- Kathleen Howard as Princess Maria
- Kent Taylor as Corrado
- Henry Travers as Baron Cesarea
- G. P. Huntley, Jr. as Eric
- Otto Hoffman as Fedele
- Hector Sarno as Pietro (uncredited)

== Releases ==
The theatrical premiere of the film was on February 23, 1934, at the Paramount Theatre in New York City. The home video releases have been:

- Death Takes a Holiday (VHS). Universal Studios. March 8, 1999.
- Death Takes a Holiday (DVD). Universal Studios. January 9, 2007. (as part of the Meet Joe Black Ultimate Edition)
- Death Takes a Holiday (DVD). Universal Studios. January 11, 2010.
- Death Takes a Holiday (Blu-Ray). Kino Lorber. July 23, 2019.

== Reception ==
On the review aggregator site Rotten Tomatoes, Death Takes a Holiday has a 78% approval rating based on 9 reviews, with an average rating of 6.80/10.

Time called the film "thoughtful and delicately morbid", while Mordaunt Hall for The New York Times wrote that "it is an impressive picture, each scene of which calls for close attention".

Richard Watts, Jr, for the New York Herald Tribune, described it as "An interesting, frequently striking and occasionally beautiful dramatic fantasy", while the Chicago Daily Tribune said that March was "completely submerged in probably the greatest role he has ever played." Variety called it "the kind of story and picture that beckons the thinker, and for this reason is likely to have greater appeal among the intelligentsia." It praised March's performance as "skillful". John Mosher of The New Yorker wrote that the film was "nicely done", although he suggested it was "a little obnoxious with all its talk of being in love with death."

The New York Times initially listed the film among those that "failed completely" at the box office. Yet one month later the same author in the Times described the movie as a "gratifying success" for Paramount that "gave new life to the stockholders".

== Remakes and adaptations ==
- A one-hour radio adaptation of the film aired on Cecil B. DeMille's Lux Radio Theatre on March 22, 1937, starring Fredric March reprising his role as Death and his wife, actress Florence Eldridge, as Grazia.
- Universal Studios, which acquired the rights to the film in 1962 following a merger with then-owners MCA, made a 1971 television production featuring Yvette Mimieux, Monte Markham, Myrna Loy, Melvyn Douglas and Bert Convy. Loy related in her biography that the production was marred by a decline in filming production standards; she described a frustrated Douglas storming off the set and returning to his home in New York when a tour guide interrupted the filming of one of his dramatic scenes to point out Rock Hudson's dressing room.
- The film was remade by Universal again in 1998 as Meet Joe Black starring Brad Pitt, Claire Forlani and Anthony Hopkins.
- It was adapted into a musical by Maury Yeston with the book by Peter Stone and Thomas Meehan. It began previews Off-Broadway on June 10, and officially opened on July 21, 2011, in a limited engagement through September 4, 2011, at the Laura Pels Theatre at the Harold & Miriam Steinberg Center for Theatre in a production by Roundabout Theatre Company.
- A May 2006 episode of the television drama Medium also builds on the concept of death portrayed as a man. The season 2 episode is similarly titled, being called "Death Takes a Policy".

== See also ==
- National Recovery Administration (NRA), the logo displayed at start of film
