= Fred J. Koenekamp =

American cinematographer (1922–2017)

- Born: Frederick James Koenekamp; November 11, 1922; Los Angeles, California, U.S.
- Died: May 31, 2017 (aged 94); Bonita Springs, Florida U.S.
- Education: University of Southern California
- Years active: 1953–1999
- Father: H. F. Koenekamp

Frederick James Koenekamp, ASC (November 11, 1922 – May 31, 2017) was an American cinematographer.

He worked in television and feature films from the 1960s, earning two Primetime Emmy Awards for his work on The Man from U.N.C.L.E. (1964–67).

Koenekamp won an Academy Award for Best Cinematography for The Towering Inferno (1974), along with Joseph Biroc, with additional nominations for Patton (1970) and Islands in the Stream (1977).

== Early life and education ==
Fred J. Koenekamp was the son of Hans Frederick "H. F." Koenekamp, a cinematographer and special effects artist. Hans was the cameraman of Mack Sennett and his career worked with the likes of Charlie Chaplin, Gloria Swanson and the Keystone Cops. Hans would later receive the ASC Presidents Award in 1991. On occasion, as a young boy, Fred would go with his father on the weekends to visit the studios which he worked in. He took particular interest in the Camera and Special Effects Department at Warner Bros.

Despite this background in film, Koenekamp developed a much greater interest in aviation and enrolled in the commercial aviation program at the University of Southern California. When World War II broke out, Koenekamp enlisted in the Navy and served in the South Pacific for three and a half years. Koenekamp would resume his education after the end of the war.

== Career ==
At the age of 23, Fred received a phone call from Herb Aller, head of the cameraman's union, and was offered a job as a film loader at RKO Pictures. It was during this time in which Fred developed a fascination with the picture business.

During this time, Bill Ellington, head of the camera department at RKO, and Ted Winchester, an associate at RKO, began to mentor Fred and during their spare time in the loading rooms, would teach Fred how to operate and take care of cameras.

The first five years of Koenekemp's career were fairly tumultuous and Fred found himself unemployed and employed again on several occasions. In 1953, Koenekamp received an offer from Bill Ellington to return to RKO to work on several 3D film setups and tests. As business began to pick up at RKO once again, Koenekamp received his first job as an assistant cameraman on Underwater! starring Jane Russell and directed by John Sturges. Koenekamp found himself in Hawaii for seven weeks and developed a skill for underwater photography.

As a result of his experience with underwater photography, Koenekamp found himself at MGM working as an assistant cameraman on a project with Esther Williams. This would initiate Koenekamp's 14-year stint at MGM.

After five years working as an assistant cameraman at MGM, Koenekamp became an operator. His first film as an operator was The Brothers Karamazov, a film adapted and directed by Richard Brooks. Moving from assistant cameraman to operator, Koenekamp described the increase in responsibilities as a daunting task. It was during this time in which Koenekamp learned how to light scenes, compose shots, and work with a director. At MGM, Fred developed close working relations with Robert Surtees, ASC and Milton Krasner, ASC. Koenekamp worked with Surtees as a technician on Raintree County, the first film shot with Panavision 70.

Koenekamp became an operator for Gunsmoke as business began to slow down at MGM. When the series wrapped, Fred found himself a four-year stint working on The Man from U.N.C.L.E. and earned himself two Emmy nominations for his work on the 1964–65 and 1965–66 seasons. Koenekamp would receive his first credit as a cinematographer for 1966's The Spy with My Face, a big screen adaptation of The Man from U.N.C.L.E. Within the next three years, Koenekamp worked on four more features with MGM—Doctor, You've Got to Be Kidding!, with Sandra Dee and George Hamilton; Stay Away, Joe (1968) and Live a Little, Love a Little, and Heaven with a Gun, with Glenn Ford. Koenekamp would then move on to work with Warner Bros. on The Great Bank Robbery.

In the midst of working on The Great Bank Robbery, Koenekamp received a call from his agent regarding interviewing with director Franklin J. Schaffner for Patton (1970). A week later, Fred received a call informing him that he was selected to be the cinematographer for the film. Patton shot in several locations including England, Greece, North Africa and Spain, and while shooting, Koenekamp developed a very close working relation with Franklin J. Schaffner. It was for Patton which Koenekamp received his first Academy Award for Best Cinematography nomination.

Koenekamp worked with Fox and director John Guillermin for 1974 action-drama disaster film The Towering Inferno. Fred worked with cinematographer Joseph Biroc on the film, and the two would win their first Academy Award for Best Cinematography. Koenekamp and Biroc would go on to work on four more features together.

Koenekamp reunited with Franklin J. Schaffner to work on Islands in the Stream and received his third Academy award nomination.

Throughout his career as a cinematographer, Koenekamp preferred to work with the same crew. He had three assistants—Mike Benson, Ed Morey and Chuck Arnold, all of which he eventually made operators. All three would eventually become cinematographers as well.

Koenekamp retired at the age of 67 as a result of his displeasure with the quality of the films he was working on. His last film was Flight of the Intruder (1991).

== Death ==
Koenekamp died, at the age of 94, on May 31, 2017, and was buried at Eternal Valley Memorial Park in Santa Clarita, California.

== Filmography ==
=== Film ===
Year	Title	Director	Notes
1965	The Spy with My Face	John Newland	
1966	One of Our Spies Is Missing	E. Darrell Hallenbeck	
1966	One Spy Too Many	Joseph Sargent	
1967	The Spy in the Green Hat	Joseph Sargent	
1967	The Karate Killers	Barry Shear	
1967	Doctor, You've Got to Be Kidding!	Peter Tewksbury	
1967	The Helicopter Spies	Boris Sagal	
1968	Sol Madrid	Brian G. Hutton	
1968	Stay Away, Joe	Peter Tewksbury	
1968	Live a Little, Love a Little	Norman Taurog	
1969	Heaven with a Gun	Lee H. Katzin	
1969	The Great Bank Robbery	Hy Averback	
1970	Patton	Franklin J. Schaffner	
1970	Beyond the Valley of the Dolls	Russ Meyer	
1970	Flap	Carol Reed	
1971	Billy Jack	Tom Laughlin	With John M. Stephens
1971	Skin Game	Paul Bogart	
1971	Happy Birthday, Wanda June	Mark Robson	
1972	Stand Up and Be Counted	Jackie Cooper	
1972	The Magnificent Seven Ride!	George McCowan	
1972	Kansas City Bomber	Jerrold Freedman	
1972	Rage	George C. Scott	
1973	Harry in Your Pocket	Bruce Geller	
1973	Papillon	Franklin J. Schaffner	
1974	Uptown Saturday Night	Sidney Poitier	
1974	The Towering Inferno	John Guillermin	With Joseph Biroc
1975	The Wild McCullochs	Max Baer Jr.	
1975	Posse	Kirk Douglas	
1975	Doc Savage: The Man of Bronze	Michael Anderson	
1975	White Line Fever	Jonathan Kaplan	
1976	Embryo	Ralph Nelson	
1977	Fun with Dick and Jane	Ted Kotcheff	
1977	Islands in the Stream	Franklin J. Schaffner	
1977	The Domino Principle	Stanley Kramer	With Ernest Laszlo
1977	The Other Side of Midnight	Charles Jarrott	
1977	The Bad News Bears in Breaking Training	Michael Pressman	
1978	The Swarm	Irwin Allen	
1979	Love and Bullets	Stuart Rosenberg	
1979	The Champ	Franco Zeffirelli	
1979	The Amityville Horror	Stuart Rosenberg	
1980	When Time Ran Out	James Goldstone	
1980	The Hunter	Buzz Kulik	
1980	First Family	Buck Henry	
1981	Carbon Copy	Michael Schultz	
1981	First Monday in October	Ronald Neame	
1982	Wrong Is Right	Richard Brooks	
1982	Yes, Giorgio	Franklin J. Schaffner	
1982	It Came from Hollywood	Malcolm Leo; Andrew Solt	Documentary film
1983	Two of a Kind	John Herzfeld	
1984	The Adventures of Buckaroo; Banzai Across the 8th Dimension	W. D. Richter	Replaced Jordan Cronenweth
1986	Stewardess School	Ken Blancato	Credited as "Anton Ken Krawczyk"
1989	Listen to Me	Douglas Day Stewart	
1989	Welcome Home	Franklin J. Schaffner	
1991	Flight of the Intruder	John Milius	

=== Television ===
Year	Title	Director	Notes
1963-1964	The Lieutenant		28 episodes
1964-1967	The Man from U.N.C.L.E.		90 episodes
1965	The Outer Limits	Felix E. Feist	Episode "The Probe"
1966	Jericho	Richard Donner	Episode "Upbeat and Underground"
1968	Mission: Impossible	Leonard Horn; Robert Totten	Episodes "Trial by Fury" and "Recovery"
1972-1973	Kung Fu	Jerry Thorpe	3 episodes
1973	Adam's Rib	Peter H. Hunt	Episode "Illegal Aid"
1973	Hawkins	Jud Taylor; Paul Wendkos	3 episodes
1979	Salvage 1	Lee Philips	Pilot episode
1982	Tales of the Gold Monkey	Ray Austin	2 episodes
1983	Whiz Kids	Corey Allen	Episode "Programmed for Murder"
1985	Alice in Wonderland	Harry Harris	Miniseries
1986-1987	Walt Disney's Wonderful World of Color	Mollie Miller; Beau Bridges; David Greenwalt; Mike Vejar; Stuart Gillard	5 episodes
1989	Hard Time on Planet Earth	Robert Mandel	Episode "Stranger in a Strange Land"

TV movies

Year	Title	Director
1968	Shadow on the Land	Richard C. Sarafian
1970	Night Chase	Jack Starrett
1971	In Search of America	Paul Bogart
1971	The Deadly Hunt	John Newland
1971	Crosscurrent	Jerry Thorpe
1975	The Runaway Barge	Boris Sagal
1975	Conspiracy of Terror	John Llewellyn Moxey
1979	Disaster on the Coastliner	Richard C. Sarafian
1982	Money on the Side	Robert L. Collins
1983	Return of the Man from U.N.C.L.E.	Ray Austin
1983	Summer Girl	Robert Michael Lewis
1984	Flight 90: Disaster on the Potomac	Robert Michael Lewis
1984	Summer Fantasy	Noel Nosseck
1984	Obsessive Love	Steven Hilliard Stern
1984	City Killer	Robert Michael Lewis
1984	The Vegas Strip War	George Englund
1984	A Touch of Scandal	Iván Nagy
1985	Not My Kid	Michael Tuchner
1985	The Other Lover	Robert Ellis Miller
1985	Amos	Michael Tuchner
1986	Pleasures	Sharron Miller
1986	News at Eleven	Mike Robe
1987	Student Exchange	Mollie Miller
1988	14 Going on 30	Paul Schneider
1988	Splash, Too	Greg Antonacci

== Awards and nominations ==
Year	Award	Category	Title	Result	Ref.
1970	Academy Awards	Best Cinematography	Patton	Nominated	
1974	Academy Awards	Best Cinematography	The Towering Inferno (with Joseph Biroc)	Won	
1977	Academy Awards	Best Cinematography	Islands in the Stream	Nominated	
2005	American Society of Cinematographers	Lifetime Achievement Award	—N/a	Won	
1974	British Academy Film Awards	Best Cinematography	The Towering Inferno	Nominated	
1965	Primetime Emmy Awards	Outstanding Cinematography for a Series	The Man from U.N.C.L.E.	Nominated	
1966	Primetime Emmy Awards	Outstanding Cinematography for a Series	The Man from U.N.C.L.E.	Nominated	
1970	Laurel Awards	Best Cinematographer	Patton	Won	
