= The Legend of Valentino =

1975 television film directed by Melville Shavelson

- Genre: Biography; Drama
- Written by: Melville Shavelson
- Directed by: Melville Shavelson
- Starring: Franco Nero
- Music by: Charles Fox
- Country of origin: United States
- Original language: English

Production
- Producers: Shelly Hull; Leonard Goldberg; Aaron Spelling
- Production locations: 20th Century Fox Studios - 10201 Pico Blvd., Century City, Los Angeles, California
- Cinematography: Archie R. Dalzell
- Editor: John Woodcock
- Running time: 100 minutes
- Production company: Spelling-Goldberg Productions

Original release
- Network: ABC
- Release: November 23, 1975

The Legend of Valentino is a 1975 American made-for-television biographical film written and directed by Melville Shavelson. It deals with real life events about the actor and sex symbol of the 1920s Rudolph Valentino.

It was broadcast by ABC on November 23, 1975.

Not to be confused with the 1961 documentary film "The Legend of Valentino".

== Cast ==
- Franco Nero as Rudolph Valentino
- Suzanne Pleshette as June Mathis
- Judd Hirsch as Jack Auerbach
- Lesley Ann Warren as Laura Lorraine (as Lesley Warren)
- Milton Berle as Jesse L. Lasky
- Yvette Mimieux as Natacha Rambova
- Harold J. Stone as Sam Baldwin
- Alicia Bond as Nazimova
- Constance Forslund as Silent Star
- Brenda Venus as Constance Carr

== Reception ==
It was the 16th highest rated show of the week when it aired.
