= Black Noon =

1971 TV film

- Release poster
- Genre: Horror; Western
- Written by: Andrew J. Fenady
- Directed by: Bernard L. Kowalski
- Starring: Roy Thinnes; Yvette Mimieux
- Music by: George Duning
- Country of origin: United States
- Original language: English

Production
- Producer: Andrew J. Fenady
- Cinematography: Keith C. Smith
- Editor: Dann Cahn
- Running time: 74 minutes
- Production companies: Andrew J. Fenady Productions; Screen Gems

Original release
- Network: CBS
- Release: November 5, 1971

Black Noon is a 1971 American horror Western television film. It was written and produced by Andrew J. Fenady and directed by Bernard L. Kowalski. The film originally aired on November 5, 1971, as part of CBS's The CBS Friday Night Movies, and was shown repeatedly in 1982.

== Plot ==
In the opening scene, an orange tabby cat runs to a beautiful woman in white, and they watch together as a church burns before them.

The scene then moves to the desert, where Reverend John Keyes (Roy Thinnes) and his wife Lorna (Lynn Loring) are stranded, and lie dying beside their disabled wagon. Three strangers, Caleb (Ray Milland), Joseph (Hank Worden) and Deliverance (Yvette Mimieux) come to their rescue, carrying them to the town of San Melas. The people of San Melas have suffered a number of recent misfortunes, and see the Reverend as a gift from heaven. Caleb takes the Keyes into his home, and introduces them to his daughter Deliverance, who is mute, and his friend Joseph.

Later, while they are discussing the town's problems, a man dressed all in black, Noon, (Henry Silva) arrives, and takes the last of his share of the local goldmine, which has now gone dry. He lassos Joseph and tries to drag him, but Keyes grabs the rope and keeps the old man from being killed. Despite the fact that there is no gold left, Noon threatens the town that he'll be back.

They ask the Reverend to preach a sermon that Sunday. Their church burned down some time ago, but the arrange an outdoor spot where the town gathers. During the sermon, Ethan (Buddy Foster) a boy who had been unable to walk without crutches, is healed. While Keyes doesn't take credit, his pride is evident.

In the night, Keyes dreams he is chased by a man, shirtless and bloodied, with a desperate look on his face.

The town wants the Reverend to stay, and they begin building a church where he can preach, and offer him a new house and more money than he could make elsewhere.

Meanwhile, his wife, Lorna, is not recovering from her ordeal in the desert. She seems to be getting weaker and weaker. We see Deliverance making a candle in the image of Lorna, and the first hints of witchcraft begin.

While the town is working on the church, Noon returns, and attempts to take Deliverance with him. He throws one of his guns to the ground, daring anyone to take him on, but no one does. As he walks back to his horse with Deliverance in tow, Keyes picks up the discarded gun and shoots Noon in the back. Deliverance speaks her first words in many years as she says "Thank you."

Shades of witchcraft become stronger as Lorna hears chanting outside her window in the night, and sees robed figures wearing animal masks. When she approaches, they disappear, but she finds the corpse of an owl in a tree stump. She faints and is found in the morning, causing another delay.

The townsfolk consider Keyes their savior and again try to convince him to stay. Though it's clear he wants to, Lorna insists they leave the next day.

Noon has been buried without ceremony, Caleb saying he thought Keyes should move on, and they'll get the next reverend to say something over the grave. That evening, Keyes goes out in the night and kneels by Noon's grave to say a prayer over him. Deliverance joins him at the graveyard, and he finally succumbs to her charms.

The church is complete, and though he's leaving soon, Keyes gives the inaugural sermon. He intended to talk about the ten commandments, but instead, he confesses his sins to the congregation. Each confession is met with more and more laughter from the town.

Keyes goes to get Lorna so they can leave, but as soon as she gets up, she collapses. Caleb tells him he'll have to stay a while longer. Several people are gathered around the bed, included the previously dead Noon. They grin as he asks "Who are you people?" Deliverance says she is Lilith, beloved of Adam before Eve. They explain that Keyes wasn't lost—they changed the road signs. The eclipse approaches, and they need someone presumed pure, but at last corrupted, for their own ceremony. Everything was put on to corrupt the Reverend more and more. Joseph shows Keyes a picture of the last reverend they corrupted, and it is the man from his dreams, who had been trying to warn him.

We next see Keyes hanging upside-down in the new church, townsfolk rushing out as they set it alight. They stand outside and chant while the church burns.

In the final scene, a family is stranded by the road with their station-wagon, and Caleb, Joseph, and Deliverance come by in their truck to help. As they drive away with the station wagon in tow, we see in the rear view mirror that the town of San Melas is actually nas SALEM backwards.

== Cast ==
- Roy Thinnes as Reverend John Keyes
- Yvette Mimieux as Deliverance
- Ray Milland as Caleb Hobbs
- Gloria Grahame as Bethia
- Lynn Loring as Lorna Keyes (as Lyn Loring)
- Henry Silva as Noon
- Hank Worden as Joseph
- William Bryant as Jacob (as Bill Bryant)
- Stan Barrett as Man in Mirror
- Joshua Bryant as Towhead
- Jennifer Bryant as Towhead
- Charles McCready as Towhead
- Leif Garrett as Towhead
- David S. Cass Sr. as Man (as Dave Cass)
- Suzan Sheppard as Wife
- Bobby Eilbacher as Boy
- Buddy Foster as Ethan

== Reception ==
Jerry Beigel wrote in the Los Angeles Times about the premiere stating that the film's release would have been more fitting a week earlier, before Halloween.

== See also ==
- List of American films of 1971
