= Yvette Mimieux =

American actress (1942–2022)

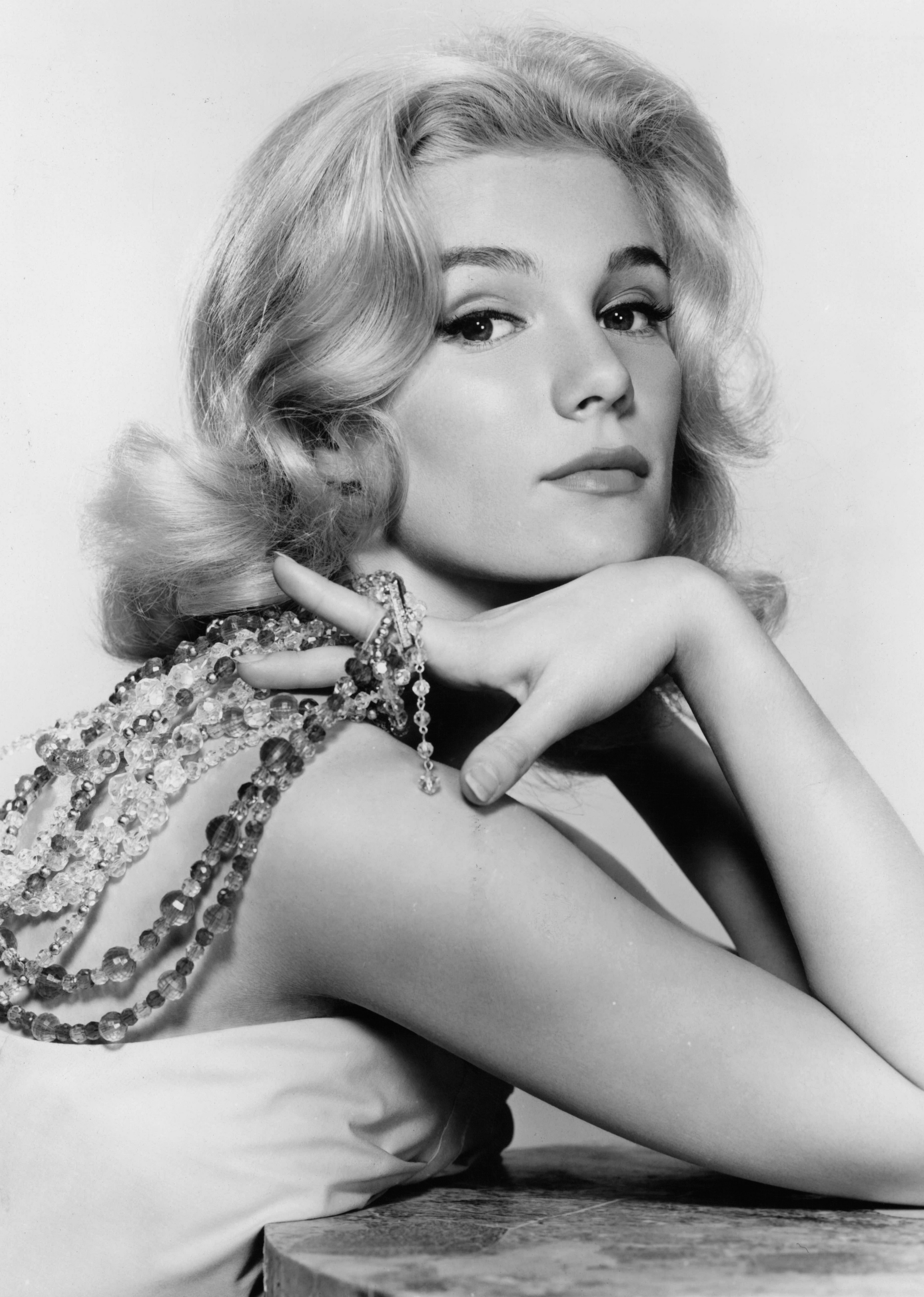
- Publicity still (1961)
- Born: Yvette Carmen Mimieux; January 8, 1942; Los Angeles, California, U.S.
- Died: January 18, 2022 (aged 80) (Note: Confliction over Mimieux's date of death appeared in the reporting. News of her death was first reported by Deadline Hollywood, phrasing it as "she was found dead on Tuesday morning" (January 18). Her representative Michelle Bega spoke directly to The New York Times, People Magazine and The Washington Post and gave the date of death as Monday night (January 17) with each source wording this differently. Tuesday was cited as the date of death by Variety without a statement from Bega. Ultimately, her obituary notice issued via the Neptune Society put her date of death as the 18th.); Los Angeles, California, U.S.
- Occupations: Actress; writer
- Years active: 1956–1992
- Known for: The Time Machine; Platinum High School; The Most Deadly Game; Where the Boys Are
- Spouses: Evan Harland Engber (m. 1959; div. 1961); Stanley Donen (m. 1972; div. 1985); Howard Ruby (m. 1986)

Yvette Carmen Mimieux (January 8, 1942 – January 18, 2022) was an American film and television actress who was a major star of the 1960s and 1970s. Her breakout role was in The Time Machine (1960). She was nominated for three Golden Globe Awards and a Photoplay Award during the course of her career.

== Early life ==
Mimieux was born in Los Angeles on January 8, 1942, to René Mimieux (1900–1975), who was half French and half German, and Maria Montemayor (1910–2000), who was Mexican. Mimieux had two siblings: a sister, Gloria, and a brother, Edouardo.

Her career was launched after talent manager Jim Byron happened to meet her and suggested she become an actress. Her first acting appearances were in episodes of the television shows Yancy Derringer and One Step Beyond, both in 1959, at the age of 17.

== Career ==
=== MGM ===
Mimieux appeared in George Pal's film version of H. G. Wells's 1895 novel The Time Machine (1960) starring Rod Taylor, in which she played the character Weena. It was made for MGM, which put her under long-term contract. Her first film was Platinum High School (1960), a low-budget teen crime drama produced by Albert Zugsmith for MGM starring Mickey Rooney and released two months before The Time Machine. Her performance in Platinum High School earned her a 1960 Golden Globe Awards nomination for "New Star Of The Year - Actress".

Mimieux guest-starred in an episode of Mr Lucky, then was one of several leads in the highly popular teen comedy-drama Where the Boys Are (1960), along with Dolores Hart, Paula Prentiss, and Connie Francis. MGM put Mimieux in the ingénue role in The Four Horsemen of the Apocalypse (1961), an expensive flop. Arthur Freed wanted to team her and George Hamilton in a remake of The Clock, but it was not made.

Mimieux had a central role in the romantic drama Light in the Piazza (1962), playing a mentally disabled girl. The film paired her romantically with Hamilton. The film lost money, but was well regarded critically. She later said: "I suppose I have a soulful quality. I was often cast as a wounded person, the 'sensitive' role."

In 1962, Mimieux was slated for a role in A Summer Affair at MGM, but it was not made.

Mimieux had a small part in Pal's The Wonderful World of the Brothers Grimm (1962), another commercial disappointment. Later that year, she appeared in Diamond Head (1963) with Charlton Heston. Mimieux went to United Artists for Toys in the Attic, based on the play by Lillian Hellman and co-starring Geraldine Page and Dean Martin. At MGM, Mimieux guest-starred on two episodes of Dr. Kildare alongside Richard Chamberlain in 1964. She played a surfer suffering from epilepsy, a performance that was much acclaimed and led to a 1965 Golden Globe nomination for "Best Actress In A Television Series".

Mimieux made a cameo as herself in Looking for Love (1964) starring Connie Francis, her costar from Where the Boys Are. She also played Richard Chamberlain's wife in Joy in the Morning (1965), a romantic melodrama.

=== Post-MGM ===
Mimieux was in a Western with Max von Sydow for 20th Century Fox, The Reward (1965); the Disney comedy Monkeys, Go Home! (1967); and the heist film The Caper of the Golden Bulls (1967).

Mimieux did The Desperate Hours (1967) for TV and was reunited with Rod Taylor in the MGM war movie Dark of the Sun (1968). In 1968, she narrated a classical music concert at the Hollywood Bowl.

In 1968, Mimieux was top-billed in the sex comedy Three in the Attic, a hit for AIP starring Christopher Jones, and then appeared in the critically acclaimed 1969 movie The Picasso Summer alongside Albert Finney. In 1970, she was the female lead in The Delta Factor, an action film co-starring Christopher George.

=== Television ===
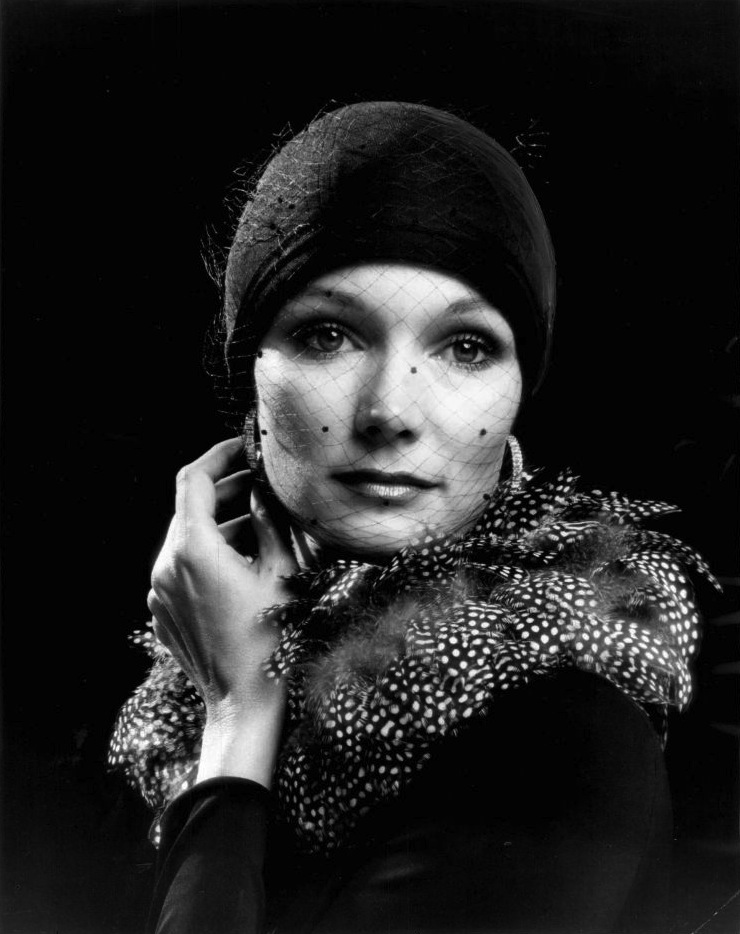
Mimieux in Hit Lady (1974)

Mimieux had one of the leads in The Most Deadly Game (1970–1971), a short-lived television series from Aaron Spelling. She replaced Inger Stevens, who had been slated to star,— but died one month before production began. For this role, Mimieux was nominated for the 1971 Golden Globe Award for Best Television Actress — Drama Series.

Around 1971, Mimieux had a business selling Haitian products and studied archaeology; she traveled several months of each year. After making the television movies Death Takes a Holiday (1971) and Black Noon (1971), she sued her agent for not providing her with movie work despite having taken her money.

Mimieux played the head stewardess in MGM's hostage thriller Skyjacked (1972), starring Charlton Heston and James Brolin and was in the Fox science-fiction film The Neptune Factor (1973).

By the early 1970s, Mimieux was unhappy with the roles offered to actresses:

The women they [male screenwriters] write are all one-dimensional. They have no complexity in their lives. It's all surface. There's nothing to play. They're either sex objects or vanilla pudding.

Mimieux had been writing for several years before this film, mostly journalism and short stories. She had the idea for a story about a Pirandello-like theme:

the study of a woman, the difference between what she appears to be and what she is: appearance vs reality...[the more I thought about the character] the more I wanted to play her. Here was the kind of nifty, multifaceted part I'd been looking for. So instead of a short story, I wrote it as a film.

Mimieux wrote a thriller, which she took to producers Aaron Spelling and Leonard Goldberg, who then produced it for ABC as a television film. It aired as Hit Lady (1974), in which Mimieux played the title character.

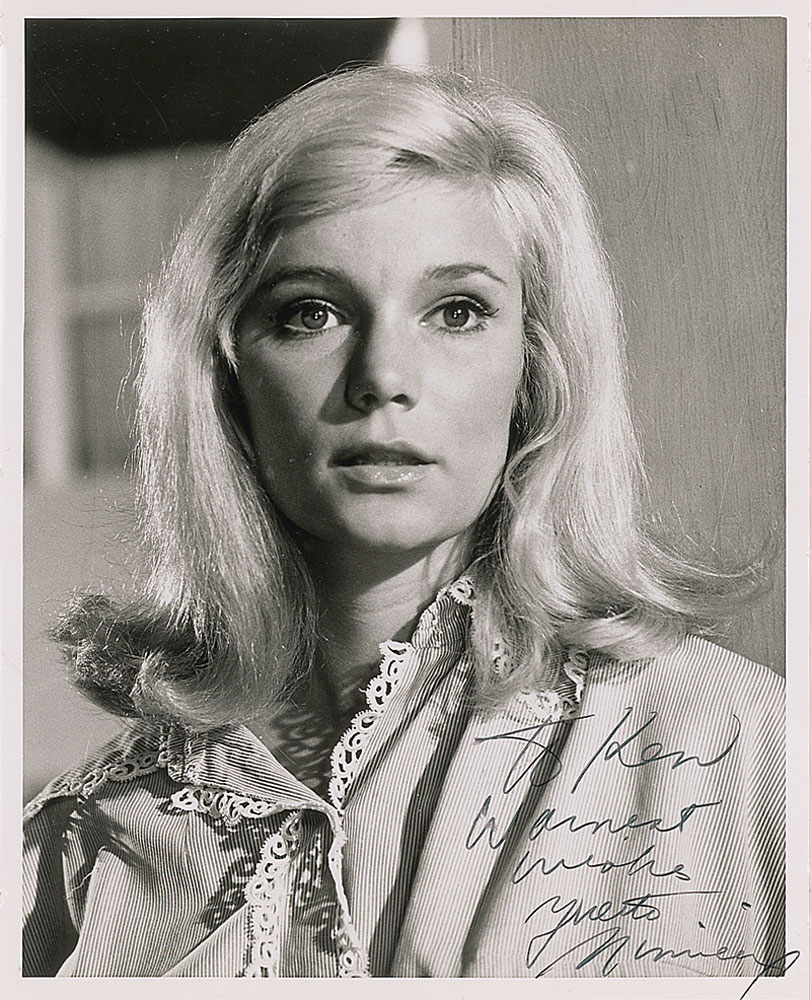
Mimieux in c. 1975

In 1975, Mimieux starred in The Legend of Valentino (as Rudolph Valentino's second wife, Natacha Rambova), and in the Canadian thriller Journey into Fear, a remake of a 1943 Orson Welles movie. In 1976, Mimieux made a pilot for a television sitcom based on Bell, Book and Candle, but it was not picked up.

=== Later movies ===
Mimieux played a falsely imprisoned woman pursued by corrupt law enforcement in the crime drama Jackson County Jail (1976) with Tommy Lee Jones and Robert Carradine for New World Pictures, which was a box-office hit.

Mimieux appeared in such horror-oriented TV movies as Snowbeast (1977), Devil Dog: The Hound of Hell (1978), and Disaster on the Coastliner (1979). She also appeared in the TV movies Ransom for Alice! (1977) and Outside Chance (1978).

Later, she co-starred in the first PG-rated Walt Disney Productions feature, the science fiction film The Black Hole (1979). She had the lead in Circle of Power (1981).

Mimieux appeared in the TV movie Forbidden Love (1982) and Night Partners (1983) and guest-starred on The Love Boat and Lime Street. She made Obsessive Love (1984), a television film about a female stalker which she co-wrote and co-produced:

There are few enough films going these days, and there are three or four women who are offered all the good parts. Of course I could play a lot of awful parts that are too depressing to contemplate.... [Television] is not the love affair I have with film, but television can be a playground for interesting ideas. I love wild, baroque, slightly excessive theatrical ideas, and because television needs so much material, there's a chance to get some of those odd ideas done.

Mimieux had the lead in the short-lived TV series Berrenger's (1985) and a supporting role in the TV movie The Fifth Missile (1986). She guest-starred in a TV movie Perry Mason: The Case of the Desperate Deception (1990). Her last film was a supporting role in Lady Boss (1992).

== Personal life and death ==
At age 17, Mimieux wed Evan Harland Engber on December 19, 1959, but kept the marriage secret for almost two years. She was married for a second time to film director Stanley Donen from 1972 until their divorce in 1985. Her last marriage was to Howard F. Ruby, chairman emeritus and co-founder of Oakwood Worldwide, the owner of the Oakwood Apartments complexes.

Mimieux died 10 days after her 80th birthday at her home in Los Angeles on January 18, 2022.

== Filmography ==
- A Certain Smile (1958) — (uncredited)
- Platinum High School (1960) — Lorinda Nibley
- The Time Machine (1960) — Weena
- Where the Boys Are (1960) — Melanie Tolman
- The Four Horsemen of the Apocalypse (1962) — Chi Chi Desnoyers
- Light in the Piazza (1962) — Clara Johnson
- The Wonderful World of the Brothers Grimm (1962) — The Princess ("The Dancing Princess")
- Diamond Head (1962) — Sloane Howland
- Toys in the Attic (1963) — Lily Berniers
- Looking for Love (1964) — Yvette Mimieux
- Joy in the Morning (1965) — Annie Brown née McGairy
- The Reward (1965) — Sylvia
- Monkeys, Go Home! (1967) — Maria Riserau
- The Caper of the Golden Bulls (1967) — Grace Harvey
- Dark of the Sun (1968) — Claire
- Three in the Attic (1968) — Tobey Clinton
- The Picasso Summer (1969) — Alice Smith
- The Delta Factor (1970) — Kim Stacy
- Skyjacked (1972) — Angela Thacher
- The Neptune Factor (1973) — Dr. Leah Jansen
- Journey Into Fear (1975) — Josette
- Jackson County Jail (1976) — Dinah Hunter
- The Black Hole (1979) — Dr. Kate McCrae
- Circle of Power (1981) — Bianca Ray
- The Fascination (1985)
- The Fantasy Film Worlds of George Pal (1985, documentary) — Weena (in The Time Machine) (archive footage)

== Television work ==
- Yancy Derringer (1959, Episode: "Collector's Item") — Ricky
- Alcoa Presents One Step Beyond (1960, Episode: "The Clown") — Nonnie Regan
- Mr. Lucky (1960, Episode: "Stacked Deck") — Margot
- Dr. Kildare (1964, 2 episodes) — Pat Holmes
- The Desperate Hours (1967, TV movie) — Cindy Hilliard
- The Most Deadly Game (1970–1971) — Vanessa Smith
- Death Takes a Holiday (1971, TV movie) — Peggy Chapman
- Black Noon (1971, TV movie) — Deliverance
- Hit Lady (1974, TV movie) — Angela de Vries
- The Legend of Valentino (1975, TV movie) — Natacha Rambova
- Bell, Book and Candle (1976, TV movie) — Gillian Holroyd
- Snowbeast (1977, TV movie) — Ellen Seberg
- Ransom for Alice! (1977, TV movie) — Jenny Cullen
- Devil Dog: The Hound of Hell (1978, TV movie) — Betty Barry
- Outside Chance (1978, TV movie) — Dinah Hunter
- Disaster on the Coastliner (1979, TV movie) — Paula Harvey
- Forbidden Love (1982, TV movie) — Joanna Bittan
- Night Partners (1983, TV movie) — Elizabeth McGuire
- The Love Boat (1984, Episode: "Hong Kong Affair") — Leni Martek
- Obsessive Love (1984, TV movie) — Linda Foster
- Berrenger's (1985, canceled after 12 episodes) — Shane Bradley
- The Fifth Missile (1986, TV movie) — Cheryl Leary
- Perry Mason: The Case of the Desperate Deception (1990, TV movie) — Danielle Altmann
- Lady Boss (1992, TV Series) — Deena Swanson (final appearance)

== Recordings ==
- The Wonderful World of the Brothers Grimm 1962 (MGM Records), as The Dancing Princess
- Baudelaire's Flowers of Evil (Les Fleurs Du Mal) 1968 (Connoisseur Society), reading excerpts of Cyril Scott's 1909 translation with music by Ali Akbar Khan
