= Obsessive Love (film) =

1984 TV movie

- Genre: Drama film
- Written by: Iris Friedman; Yvette Mimieux; Petru Popescu
- Directed by: Steven Hilliard Stern
- Starring: Yvette Mimieux; Simon MacCorkindale; Constance McCashin; Kin Shriner; Jill Jacobson
- Music by: Terri Fricon
- Country of origin: United States
- Original language: English

Production
- Executive producer: Frank von Zerneck
- Cinematography: Fred Koenekamp
- Editors: Daniel P. Hanley; Mike Hill
- Running time: 96 minutes
- Production companies: Incorporated Television Company; MoonLight Productions II; Onza

Original release
- Network: CBS
- Release: October 2, 1984

Obsessive Love is a 1984 made-for-TV movie starring Yvette Mimieux, who co-wrote the story and produced the film as well.

== Plot ==
A reserved woman goes to Hollywood meets and entices a soap opera star into an unhealthily idealistic relationship.

== Cast ==
- Yvette Mimieux as Linda Foster
- Simon MacCorkindale as Glenn Stevens
- Constance McCashin as Jackie Stevens
- Kin Shriner as Garreth
- Jill Jacobson as DeeDee
- Allan Miller as Sedgely
- Louise Latham as Mrs. Foster
- Jonathan Goldsmith Alex
- Lainie Kazan as Margaret Chase
- Jerry Supiran as Bobby Stevens
- Robert DoQui as Douglas
- Troy Evans as Studio Guard

== Production ==
"There are few enough films going these days," she said, "and there are three or four women who are offered all the good parts. Of course I could play a lot of awful parts that are too depressing to contemplate.... [Television is] not the love affair I have with film, but television can be a playground for interesting ideas. I love wild, baroque, slightly excessive theatrical ideas, and because television needs so much material, there's a chance to get some of those odd ideas done."

The film was Mimieux's idea. She based it on John Hinckley and thought it would be interesting if the sexes were reversed.

Mimieux said the network "felt people wouldn't believe me as this woman. They said to me, 'She's a loner, and she shouldn't be attractive.' I asked them, 'Are you saying that only unattractive people can be crazy or lonely or have unfulfilled lives?'" She also pushed against over explaining her character's condition. "I prefer simply looking at the character, following her, seeing her intensity, her passion, her single-mindedness and her intelligence. To do a thumbnail psychological sketch was not what I wanted. That's the kind of thing they love to do on television so everybody understands everything, but in life we don't always understand everything. Even an analyst may not understand the person after years of analysis."

== Critical response ==
John J. O'Connor of The New York Times wrote: "As noted, Miss Mimieux is not limiting her talents on this project to acting. She worked closely with the script writers Petru Popescu and Iris Friedman and, with Robert M. Sertner, was the co-producer. The burden of responsibility is unmistakable."
