= The Three Wishes of Billy Grier =

- Genre: Drama
- Written by: Corey Blechman
- Directed by: Corey Blechman
- Starring: Ralph Macchio; Betty Buckley; Season Hubley; Hal Holbrook
- Music by: Brad Fiedel
- Country of origin: United States
- Original language: English

Production
- Executive producer: Gerald I. Isenberg
- Producer: Jay Benson
- Cinematography: Frank Stanley
- Editor: Gregory Prange
- Running time: 100 minutes
- Production company: I & C Productions

Original release
- Network: ABC
- Release: November 1, 1984

The Three Wishes of Billy Grier is a 1984 American made-for-television drama film starring Ralph Macchio and directed by Corey Blechman. It was originally broadcast on ABC on November 1, 1984.

While this movie is a fictional work, it is prefaced by a note accounting that a condition such as the main character's does exist, and that the film imagines the life of such a victim.

== Plot ==
Ralph Macchio plays Billy Grier, the 15-year-old victim of a rare degenerative disease that speeds up the aging process. After Billy suddenly becomes ill, a series of tests are run, with the diagnosis tragic. A team of doctors tell Billy and his mother Nancy (Betty Buckley) that there is no cure for his condition and that he will die of old age related natural causes decades before his time. Shortly after this, Billy breaks down following a rage-filled rant where he destroys almost everything in his bedroom.

With only a few months left to live, Billy hopes to realize three goals: He wants to play his saxophone in a jazz band; have sex with a woman for the first time, and find his long estranged father one last time.

Due to the sensitive nature of his parents' relationship and to protect her from his degenerative condition, Billy chooses not to tell Nancy about his wishes, setting out on his own to see his wishes fulfilled.

Billy finds the key to two of his wishes when he meets Phyllis (Season Hubley), a sassy young woman with dreams of her own, one of which is to open a beauty salon. The two set out to work together and realize their dreams. Phyllis makes his first come true when they walk into a jazz club and she encourages him to play his saxophone. Billy plays well enough to awe the customers into stopping their conversations and listen to him play.

As time passes, Billy realizes he cannot keep his secret from Phyllis any longer. He tells her one evening that he wishes to have sex with her, a request she denies, though not entirely in opposition to the idea.

Billy helps Phyllis realize her own dream when she applies for a loan to open her beauty salon, introducing him (by the name Bill) as her friend and associate, when questioned about her business acumen. Billy balks during a moment alone with Phyllis, stating that he knows nothing at all about business, and believes Phyllis to be using him. However, the bank officer, after seeing Billy's obvious signs of aging, is convinced that he's a credible partner with experience, which minimizes the risk of giving Phyllis the loan, which is then approved.

Throughout all of this is a subplot involving Nancy, who discovers that her son is gone and believes he has left to go and die alone. She becomes depressed and despondent, totally cutting herself off from the outside world. When utility workers come to shut off her gas for non-payment, she flatly tells them to do what they have to do. A moment later, she comes to her senses and writes them a check to pay off her back balance. This begins the process of her getting on with her life and realizing that she may never see her son alive again.

Phyllis helps Billy realize another dream, as she has sex with him for the very first time. The following morning, Billy gets up early to leave, wishing to spare Phyllis from his impending doom. A tearful Phyllis is already up waiting for him, not wanting him to be alone in his current condition. She relents after Billy explains to her that he intends to go back home and straighten things out with his mother.

On his way back, Billy stops at a diner, where he suddenly falls ill and ducks behind the building to throw up. The diner's fry cook assists him — it is his father, who has been living a hand-to-mouth existence and suffers from alcoholism. Billy's father does not recognize his son nor does Billy disclose his relationship to the man.

Billy returns home and passes Nancy on an airport escalator, however she fails to recognize him. However, her eye catches a glimpse of her son, now in his advanced stages of aging. After a moment she recognizes her son and rushes into his arms.

The movie ends with Nancy and Billy at a camping village, making the most of their last remaining days together.

== Cast ==
- Ralph Macchio as Billy Grier
- Betty Buckley as Nancy Grier
- Hal Holbrook as Grandpa Grier
- Season Hubley as Phyllis
- Jeffrey Tambor as Dr. Lindsey
- Lawrence Pressman as Frank
- Conchata Ferrell as Dr. Gardner
- Ed Lauter as Mr. Grier
- Viveca Lindfors as Dr. Rice
- Laura Dern as Crissy
- Betty Phillips as Mary Whitelaw
- Meredith Bain Woodward as Mrs. Patrick (as Meredith Woodward)
- Janet Wright as Woman in Bar
- Bill Murdoch as Scott
- Lillian Carlson as Manager of Hotel
- Stephen E. Miller as Gas Man
- Shelley Fisher Piano Player

== Sources ==
- Review: The New York Times
