= Stormy Weathers (film) =

1992 film by Will Mackenzie

- Genre: Action; Adventure; Crime
- Written by: Stephan Blom-Cooper; V. Phipps-Wilson; Gerald Ayres
- Directed by: Will Mackenzie
- Starring: Cybill Shepherd
- Music by: David Bell
- Country of origin: United States
- Original language: English

Production
- Executive producers: Steven Haft; Cybill Shepherd; Marcia Nasatir
- Producer: Vahan Moosekian
- Cinematography: Robert Draper
- Editor: Neil Mandelberg
- Running time: 95 minutes
- Production companies: Haft / Nasatir Company; River Siren Productions Inc. TriStar Television

Original release
- Network: ABC
- Release: May 4, 1992

Stormy Weathers is a 1992 American action adventure television film directed by Will Mackenzie and starring Cybill Shepherd. The film premiered on May 4, 1992 on ABC.

== Plot ==
An Italian aristocrat hires detective Samantha Weathers (Cybill Shepherd) to uncover the details of an old inheritance issue. The more she looks, the more complicated the case becomes.

Her investigation into the disappearance of the aristocrat’s older brother reveals an underhand plot involving drug smuggling, radical politics, murder and corruption in high places.

== Cast ==
- Cybill Shepherd as Samantha Weathers
- Robert Beltran as Gio
- Charlie Schlatter as Squirrel
- Kurt Fuller as Ernie Horshack
- Diane Salinger as "Bogey"
- Roy Thinnes as Andrew Chase
- Mimi Kuzyk as Gloria Chase
- Kene Holiday as Rashid (credited as Kene Holliday)
- Philip Baker Hall as Dr. Comden
- Tony Lo Bianco as Lieutenant Frank Orozco
- Al Fann as Cecil Wilkes
- Ethel Ayler as Clara Wilkes
- Arthur Malet as Pidge
- Lilyan Chauvin as Mrs. Comden
