= Shadow on the Land =

- Also known as: United States: It Can't Happen Here
- Genre: Science fiction; Thriller
- Created by: Sidney Sheldon
- Based on: It Can't Happen Here by Sinclair Lewis
- Screenplay by: Nedrick Young
- Directed by: Richard C. Sarafian
- Starring: Jackie Cooper; John Forsythe; Gene Hackman; Carol Lynley; Janice Rule; Marc Strange
- Composer: Sol Kaplan
- Country of origin: United States
- Original language: English

Production
- Producers: Matthew Rapf; Sheldon Schrager
- Cinematography: Fred J. Koenekamp
- Editor: Henry Batista
- Running time: 100 minutes
- Production company: Screen Gems

Original release
- Network: ABC
- Release: December 4, 1968

Shadow on the Land, also known as United States: It Can't Happen Here, is a 1968 television film which aired on ABC. It was adapted from the 1935 Sinclair Lewis novel It Can't Happen Here by Nedrick Young, and directed by Richard C. Sarafian. The plot involves a president creating a fascist, totalitarian regime in the United States, and a resistance movement forming against it.

== Cast ==
- Marc Strange as Major Shepherd McCloud
- Jackie Cooper as Lieutenant Colonel Andy Davis
- John Forsythe as General Wendell Bruce
- Gene Hackman as Reverend Thomas Davis
- Carol Lynley as Abigail "Abby" Tyler
- Janice Rule as Captain Everett
- Michael Margotta as Timothy Willing (credited as Mike Margotta)
- Scott Thomas as Felting
- Myron Healey as General Hempstead
- Frederic Downs as Drucker
- Jonathan Goldsmith as Lieutenant Allen (credited as Johnathan Lippe)
- Bill Walker as Arnold
- Mickey Sholdar as Paul
- Sandy McPeak as Ben (credited as Sandy Kevin)
- Ken Swofford as private
- Kay Stewart as Sergeant O'Hara
- Paulene Myers as Webber
- Paul Sorensen as Bricker

== Production ==
The film was shot in four weeks, and had a $1 million budget.
