= Death Takes a Holiday (1971 film) =

1971 film by Robert Butler

- Genre: Drama; Fantasy; Romance
- Based on: play by Alberto Casella
- Written by: Walter Ferris
- Teleplay by: Rita Lakin
- Directed by: Robert Butler
- Starring: Yvette Mimieux; Monte Markham; Myrna Loy; Bert Convy; Melvyn Douglas
- Music by: Laurindo Almeida
- Country of origin: United States
- Original language: English

Production
- Producer: George Eckstein
- Cinematography: Michael D. Margulies (as Michael Margulies)
- Editor: Michael Economou
- Running time: 74 minutes
- Production company: Universal Television

Original release
- Network: ABC
- Release: October 23, 1971

Death Takes a Holiday is a 1971 American made-for-television drama fantasy romance film directed by Robert Butler and starring Yvette Mimieux, Monte Markham, Bert Convy and Melvyn Douglas.

It was a remake of Death Takes a Holiday. The Los Angeles Times called it a "rare and elegant treat".

== Plot ==
Death takes a human form and visits Earth to find out why humans want so desperately to cling to life. He unexpectedly falls in love with a beautiful young woman.

== Cast ==
- Yvette Mimieux as Peggy Chapman
- Monte Markham as David Smith
- Myrna Loy as Selena Chapman
- Bert Convy as John Cummings
- Melvyn Douglas as Judge Earl Chapman

== See also ==
- List of American films of 1971
