= Night Partners =

1983 film

Night Partners is a 1983 American TV movie by director Noel Nosseck starring Yvette Mimieux and Diana Canova. It was based on a true story about a project to help victims of crime in Arizona.
