= Coffee, Tea or Me? (film) =

- Genre: Comedy
- Written by: Stanley Ralph Ross; Norman Panama; Albert E. Lewin
- Story by: Stanley Ralph Ross
- Directed by: Norman Panama
- Theme music composer: Morton Stevens
- Country of origin: United States
- Original language: English

Production
- Producer: Mark Carliner
- Production locations: London; CBS Studio Center
- Cinematography: William T. Cline
- Editor: Bud S. Isaacs
- Running time: 74 min.
- Production company: CBS Television Network

Original release
- Network: CBS
- Release: September 11, 1973

Coffee, Tea or Me? is an American made-for-television film that first aired as the season premiere of The New CBS Tuesday Night Movies on CBS on September 11, 1973. Starring Karen Valentine, John Davidson, Michael Anderson Jr., and Louise Lasser, it is a romantic comedy about a good-natured airline stewardess who has two husbands—one in Los Angeles and one in London. When she learns that she is pregnant but does not know who the father is, her two lives converge with comic results. The film is inspired by the best-selling 1967 book Coffee, Tea or Me?: The Uninhibited Memoirs of Two Airline Stewardesses, purportedly by Trudy Baker and Rachel Jones but actually by the ghostwriter Donald Bain. However, it has virtually no relation to this publication and instead more closely recalls the 1953 film The Captain's Paradise. It exemplifies the fascination with the sexual lives of stewardesses in the United States in the late 1960s and early 1970s. Although it was a ratings success, it was panned by both liberal and conservative critics.

== Plot ==
Carol (Karen Valentine) is a stewardess for Global American Airlines who flies the Los Angeles to London route. In the film's opening scene, she rushes to Heathrow Airport to catch her flight to Los Angeles with her friend and fellow stewardess, Susan Edmonds (Louise Lasser). This scene is followed by an animated title and credits sequence humorously portraying the indignities that Carol and Susan are subjected to as stewardesses, scored to a song with the same theme. Subsequent animated sequences bridge the London-based and the Los Angeles–based scenes.

Carol lives in Los Angeles with her American husband Dennis Burnham (John Davidson), a medical student who decided to become a doctor after he lost his job in the aerospace industry. Carol and Dennis have been happily married for three years. She is supporting him financially until he graduates.

Carol also has a British husband in London, Tommy Byrnes (Michael Anderson Jr.), a despondent artist she agreed to marry six months ago to stop him from jumping off the Tower Bridge. At their home, Tommy tells Carol that an art dealer in San Francisco has bought several of his paintings and promised him a solo exhibition at his gallery. She replies that he might not need her anymore because his career prospects are improving, but he ignores her.

Later, Susan sees Carol and Tommy kissing at a boutique on King's Road. On a flight to Los Angeles, Carol confesses to Susan that she has two husbands. She explains: "That's when I made this terrible discovery. … A girl like me, from a nice family, honest, moral, and absolutely, totally sincere, can be happily married to two men at the same time." She insists that nothing could go wrong because they both need her, are 6,000 miles apart, and will never meet.

At home in Los Angeles, on her third anniversary with Dennis, Carol receives a telegram from Tommy, who asks her to meet him at the Shelby Hotel in San Francisco that day. However, she tells Dennis that the telegram says that her Aunt Clarissa has died and that she must go to San Francisco immediately for the funeral. She then rushes out to catch a flight.

In San Francisco, Carol and Tommy return to the hotel after attending his exhibition opening. Tommy says that he wishes to visit Los Angeles and that he wants her to quit her job now that his career has taken off. He then goes to the reception desk to cash some traveler's checks. Coincidentally, Dennis shows up at the same time looking for Carol. He books a suite on the seventh floor—the same floor as Tommy's suite. Tommy asks the desk clerk for a recommendation for a lobster restaurant, and Dennis tells him that the hotel has the best lobster in town; the two men do not realize both are married to the same woman. Tommy arranges to have a lobster dinner with Carol served in his suite.

Carol runs into Dennis on the seventh floor. He tells her that he received a $5,000 scholarship and that he wants her to quit her job so that he can finally take care of her after she has been so supportive of him. He, too, arranges to have a lobster dinner with Carol served in his suite. Carol is now in a dilemma because she is expected to dine and then spend the night with both men. Taking advantage of Dennis's absorption in a football game on television, she shuttles between the two suites, much to the confusion of the waiter (Lou Jacobi) serving dinner to both parties. She slips a tranquilizer in Tommy's wine glass. After he passes out, she and the waiter put him to bed, and she leaves him a note saying she was called for an emergency flight to Honolulu.

A month later, Susan tells Carol that she is worried about her and encourages her to see a doctor (George Coulouris), who determines that Carol is pregnant. Carol thinks Dennis is the father, but is not sure. Susan maintains that she will have to break up with either Dennis or Tommy, but Carol replies that both need her. Susan advises her not to tell either man she is pregnant, but to feel them out to see which one wants to be a father. Tommy is excited about the possibility; Dennis is more hesitant because of the expense but admits that if she becomes pregnant, he would be happy.

Because Carol does not want to hurt either man by revealing her secret, she decides to write letters to each one saying that she is leaving him with no explanation. After he reads his letter, Dennis desperately tries to locate Carol. He tracks her London address to Tommy's home. Dennis and Tommy talk, and they discover they are both married to a stewardess from Global American Airlines, but still do not realize that she is Carol. As Dennis is leaving, Tommy receives his letter.

Dennis and Tommy separately board the same flight back to Los Angeles and are seated in the same row. They notice they both have a letter from Carol and remember they had met at the Shelby Hotel. They finally realize they are married to the same woman. They force Susan, one of the stewardesses on the flight, to reveal Carol's secret. She tells them everything, except that Carol is pregnant.

After the flight lands, Dennis and Tommy race to Susan's apartment, where Carol is residing, but Susan arrives first. Carol is planning to fly to Montreal that evening to stay with her Aunt Clarissa until the baby is born, when she will give the baby up for adoption. Susan bursts in and tells Carol they must leave immediately because Dennis and Tommy met on the plane and she told them everything. Carol responds that she has decided to tell the men the truth—that she wants a father for her baby. She also declares that Dennis is the man she really wants.

Dennis and Tommy arrive and angrily confront Carol. She reveals that she is pregnant but does not know who the father is. When the two men start arguing, she becomes upset by their insensitivity to her. She tearfully tells them she has been very devoted to them both and then storms out of the apartment to catch her flight to Montreal. Susan scolds the two men and urges them to go after her. On the plane, the stewardess offers Carol something to drink. Carol says, "I know, coffee, tea, …." Then Dennis arrives and finishes her sentence with "or me," and they embrace.

== Cast ==
- Karen Valentine as Carol Burnham-Byrnes
- John Davidson as Dennis Burnham
- Michael Anderson Jr. as Tommy Byrnes
- Louise Lasser as Susan Edmonds
- Lou Jacobi as Waiter
- Erica Hagen as Lisa Benton
- George Coulouris as Doctor
- Nora Marlowe as Mrs Fitzgerald
- Kenneth Tobey as Captain
- James Sikking as Businessman

== Production ==
=== Development ===
Coffee, Tea or Me? is inspired by the 1967 book Coffee, Tea or Me?: The Uninhibited Memoirs of Two Airline Stewardesses, purportedly by Trudy Baker and Rachel Jones. Both women, however, are the fictional creations of the true author, Donald Bain. At the time, he was a public relations employee for American Airlines. He subsequently embarked on a lucrative career as the ghostwriter of numerous novels, including a later series of mysteries credited to the fictional detective Jessica Fletcher of Murder, She Wrote. Bain penned the book after meeting two real stewardesses, Jo Ann Blaisdell and Melva Hicks, who recounted to him their experiences in the profession. They posed as Trudy and Rachel, respectively, in promotional appearances, even though Bain was publicly identified as the book's author as early as 1971. He later told the full story of his ruse in his autobiography.

In 1968, Frank McCarthy at 20th Century-Fox optioned the film rights to the book, but he allowed the option to lapse. Subsequently, Robert Aldrich picked up the option for his independent production company, Associates & Aldrich. Aldrich was a renowned director whose recent films up to that time included What Ever Happened to Baby Jane?, Hush … Hush, Sweet Charlotte, and The Dirty Dozen. ABC Films agreed to produce the film he envisioned. He lined up Alexandra Hay, a young actress he was promoting, to star. He also commissioned a screenplay from the writer Theodore J. Flicker that emphasized the book's more sensationalistic aspects: "Ted Flicker did a very funny, very dirty script. We had our girl as the only hostess who was a virgin, who was trying not to be a virgin. In other words, we took the Doris Day formula of all those successful Pillow Talk movies and inverted it. Instead of the only girl in the office who was retaining her virginity, her friends were trying to get her laid, and something always happened to interfere." However, ABC refused to produce the project. As a result, Aldrich reacquired the film, budgeted at $1.9 million. Then, he, too, allowed his option to lapse.

In January 1972, Bain and his agent met with the producer Mark Carliner, who proposed to produce the film with CBS Television. Carliner knew Bain from a short promotional film he made about a couple from the Midwest who fly to New York for a vacation when Bain was working at American Airlines, which financed the film. He agreed to hire Bain to write the screenplay, and the deal moved forward. While Carliner was pleased with Bain's script, CBS was not and insisted that he replace Bain. He approached the screenwriter Stanley Ralph Ross. Ross recalled that Carliner told him the previous screenplay had not worked out and asked him if he had a story that related to the film's title. Almost immediately, Ross, who had not read the book, proposed a story based on an incident involving his former agent. The agent was married to a stewardess, whom Ross once saw on King's Road in London with another man. The premise of a woman juggling two husbands also recalls the plot of the 1953 comedy film, The Captain's Paradise, which stars Alec Guinness as a ferry captain with a wife in Gibraltar and a lover in Spanish Morocco.

Carliner liked the idea, and Ross proceeded to write the script in collaboration with the film's director, Norman Panama, who had directed a string of successful comedic films, and Albert E. Lewin, who had written for numerous hit sitcoms. Except for the animated title and credits sequence, the final script bears no relation to the book (although on Dennis's and Tommy's flight to Los Angeles, the following announcement is heard: "This is your stewardess Rachel Jones. Trudy Baker will be your stewardess in the forward section. …"). In addition, it is much tamer than the script that Aldrich commissioned. As Aldrich remarked, "CBS bought it and they went back to the straight title and the more mundane situation about stewardesses' lives." The only suggestive scene is one in which Dennis, who is shirtless, is in bed studying for an exam on female anatomy. Carol leans over him, kisses him, and says "it's not all printed in books." In the next scene, she comes to the defense of a fellow stewardess after a lascivious businessman (James B. Sikking) makes an unwelcome advance.

CBS approved the script, and the film went into production. Bain asserts that CBS had proceeded without his knowledge on the basis of an oral agreement with his agent. While he considered taking legal action against the network, he ultimately decided to end the dispute by accepting the $12,500 fee his agent had negotiated, which he shared with the agent, Blaisdell, and Hicks.

Valentine was signed to the film in December 1972. Davidson (who costarred with her in "Love and the Scroungers," from the February 4, 1972 episode of Love American Style), Anderson (who costarred with her in The Daughters of Joshua Cabe, a made-for-television film that first aired on September 13, 1972), and the other major cast members were signed by January 1973. Critic Cecil Smith observed that casting the actress, who had achieved fame as the wholesome substitute teacher Alice Johnson on ABC's hit sitcom Room 222, was surprising. Valentine told Smith that she had never read the book because she had heard it was too salacious for her tastes, but she accepted the role because she liked the script: "While it's not Gidget, it's not all that naughty. In fact, it's pretty mild by standards these days. I gather it has almost nothing to do with the book except it's about a stewardess who flies the Los Angeles–London run. … And has a husband in each city." She adds that the film is "all in the best of taste." She was also interested in changing her image as Room 222 was winding down. In her next made-for-television film, The Girl Who Came Gift-Wrapped, she played a young woman who is given to a Hugh Hefner–type playboy as a "present" for the night of his fortieth birthday. In 1975 Valentine remarked that neither film "offended anyone, despite some spicy content. Darn it, I guess some of Alice Johnson is in all of the parts I play."

=== Filming ===
Filming of Coffee, Tea or Me?, which took place in Los Angeles and London, began in January 1973. Levitow/Hanson Films, an animation production company established in 1972 by the legendary animator Abe Levitow and Dave Hanson, created the animated sequences. These brilliantly colored sequences feature an anthropomorphic jet whose face reacts to the events in the narrative. Displaying the film's closest connection to the book, which includes bawdy cartoons by Bill Wenzel, an artist who drew for men's magazines, the comical title and credits sequence features animated versions of Carol and Susan being leered at and slapped on their rears by male passengers, in addition to being subjected to other indignities. Three songs, with music by Morton Stevens and lyrics by Hermine Hilton, performed by a chorus of female singers, also provide commentary on the action. For example, the second song proclaims, "Whatcha doin' girl? Whatcha doin' now? Kinda looks like you're fooling with love and you're gonna get caught somehow. … Can't love one if you love two. That's too many for you."

== Broadcast ==
Coffee, Tea or Me? was broadcasr as the season premiere episode of The New CBS Tuesday Night Movies on Tuesday, September 11, 1973, from 9:30 to 11 p.m. It aired opposite the last part of the ABC Tuesday Movie of the Week (the made-for-televsion film Deliver Us from Evil) and Marcus Welby, M.D. on ABC and the made-for-television film Drive Hard, Drive Fast on NBC. It was repeated on Friday, May 24, 1974. In 1979, Trident Television Associates Inc. acquired domestic distribution rights to the film, and it aired periodically on American television through the 1990s.

== Reception ==
=== Ratings ===
For the week ending September 16, 1973, Coffee, Tea or Me? was the sixth most-watched program of the week, with a rating of 25.7 and a share of 43. It was tied with The Execution of Private Slovik as the thirteenth most-watched made-for-television movie of the 1973–1974 season.

=== Reviews ===
Although Coffee, Tea or Me? was a ratings success, critics panned it.

In the Hollywood Reporter, Sue Cameron condemns the film for what she describes as its dated and sexist script. She declares that it "is one of the most insulting, idiotic pieces of film ever made for any medium. It is incredible to me that in this day and age this kind of stuff can actually get on television." She questions Valentine's decision to accept the role because her character sets back womanhood: "She also has no sense of self-worth. She doesn't know why she married either man, and no one realizes that in today's times she didn't have to get married at all. Not only that but she becomes pregnant and not once does anyone think about abortion or any logical action" (the U.S. Supreme Court had issued its decision legalizing abortion in Roe v. Wade on January 22, 1973). She does, however, state that Davidson and Anderson do their best and that Lasser is the film's one bright spot.

By contrast, in her review for the Daily News, Kay Gardella criticizes the film as an example of the New Morality. She observes that Carol never examines the moral implications of her decision to marry two men: "Throughout this film, a lightweight, repetitious comedy that is forced to rely heavily on animated bridges for its action, Carol, the young lady, is never once really conscience-stricken about her dual life." She continues: "What fascinates us about the plot is that at no point is the legal matter of bigamy discussed nor does Carol ever face up to the question of morality in her situation. What we're being told is that if it was good enough for Alec Guinness in 'Captain's Paradise' and other men throughout the ages it's okay for women, too." Similarly, in his review for the Philadelphia Inquirer, Harry Harris argues that the film exemplifies the rampant permissiveness of the new television season and remarks that its "resolution—at least for those brought up on the old dictum that crime (except in real life) doesn't pay—is a real eyebrow-escalator."

The reviewer for Variety focuses his critique on the film's lack of aesthetic merit. He describes it as a ludicrous work that "was 'Gidget Gets With Child in Either London and/or Los Angeles.' … Not since the networks' new season of 'relevance' … has a theme seemed so beyond the grasp of the medium." In his long summary of the film, he mocks both the plot and the characters. Similarly, in a brief review in the Los Angeles Times, Cecil Smith describes the film as "disappointingly trite" and "just plain lousy." While he praises the performances of Davidson, Anderson, and especially Lasser, he writes: "There's little they or Ms. Valentine can do with this creaky material. There's one sequence in which both husbands turn up at a San Francisco hotel in suites on opposite sides of a hall with Karen darting from one to the other that was the sort of bedroom farce that I thought went out with hoop skirts. Not even a fine old farceur like Lou Jacobi could help."

== Home media ==
Coffee, Tea or Me? has not been released officially on DVD. The film occasionally appears on video-sharing platforms such as YouTube.

== Themes and analysis ==
During the 1960s and 1970s, the cultural fascination with stewardesses reached its zenith in the United States. Stewardesses were typically portrayed as glamorous icons of the Jet Age who exuded sexual appeal, rather than as professionals whose primary job was to ensure passengers' safety. As the scholar Kathleen Barry argues, "In the late 1960s and early 1970s commercial expressions of the sexual revolution had cast stewardesses in a newly provocative role. In airline advertisements and popular novels and films, the 'swinging stewardess' represented a male, heterosexual vision of a new era in which women eagerly embraced opportunities for overt flirtation and sexual adventures." Many of the airlines encouraged this tendency by requiring stewardesses to wear hot pants and other revealing uniforms and featuring them in advertising campaigns with provocative slogans like National Airlines's "I'm Cheryl—Fly Me."

The mass media reinforced this image. Films on stewardesses became progressively more suggestive, from Come Fly with Me (1963) to Boeing, Boeing (1965), The Stewardesses (1969), The Swingin' Stewardesses (1971), and Fly Me (1973). On television, sitcoms and variety shows coyly alluded to the stereotype of the sexually alluring stewardess. The book Coffee, Tea or Me? spawned three sequels and numerous imitators. Published in 1972, the second sequel is a sexually explicit guide to the New Morality of the 1970s that encourages liberated women to make their own lifestyle choices: "We offer only one suggestion before you read our book: Today's New Morality means nothing more than your freedom to do whatever it is that makes you happy, secure and satisfied."

In the film Coffee, Tea or Me?, Carol makes just such a choice. She is a stewardess who makes the unconventional decision to marry two men, and she is happily married to both until she is forced to settle on one after she becomes pregnant and her two lives converge. However, the film is tamer than more sensationalistic portrayals of stewardesses' lives in the early 1970s. In addition, it ends conventionally with Carol choosing one man: Dennis. As the song played over the closing credits states, "And now you're playing your part just like a gentle girl should. Can't love one if you love two. That's too many for you. ... Better keep it just him and you for the rendezvousing." Nevertheless, the film faced criticism from both sides of the political spectrum. Liberal critics argued that Carol was far from liberated, viewing her as a woman who naively believes she must marry two men out of duty and that she must give birth to her baby. Meanwhile, conservative critics insisted that she embodied the dangerous permissiveness of the New Morality.
