= Boeing Boeing =

Boeing Boeing may refer to:

- Boeing-Boeing (play), written by playwright Marc Camoletti
- Boeing Boeing (1965 film), an American film adaptation, starring Jerry Lewis and Tony Curtis
- Boeing Boeing (1985 film), a Malayalam film adaptation, directed by Priyadarshan, starring Mohanlal and Mukesh

== See also ==
- Boing Boing, an Internet publishing entity, magazine, and group blog
