= Chris Condon =

American inventor, cinematographer and entrepreneur (1923–2010)

Chris J. Condon (1923 – December 19, 2010), born Christo Dimitri Koudounis, was the inventor of the 3D film system used by his company StereoVision, a cinematographer, and founder of Sierra Pacific Airlines.

== Life and career ==
He was born in North Chicago, Illinois. During World War II, he received four Bronze Battle Stars while working as combat crew and as a cinematographer on B-24 and A-26 aircraft in the Pacific. Upon his death in 2010, he was buried at Riverside National Cemetery in Riverside, California.

After the war, he worked at Douglas Aircraft as a trainee before starting his own business in 1947, Century Precision Optics Company of North Hollywood, California. With the company, he developed the Tele-Athenar telephoto lens which was used by Walt Disney photographers in the True Life Adventures series.

In 1953, he received his first patent for a 3D projection system. The system replaced the previous method of using two cameras. His invention was inspired by the film House of Wax.

He taught at Columbia College Hollywood from 1958 to 1960.

He co-wrote the American Cinematographer Manual for the American Society of Cinematographers with Joseph V. Mascelli in 1963.

In 1969, he and his partner Allan Silliphant received a patent for the world's first single-camera 3-D motion picture lens and formed the company Magnavision, which later became StereoVision Entertainment. After the success of soft X, eventually the 3D movie The Stewardesses was R rated.

In 1970, he and Silliphant founded Trans Sierra Airlines, later known as Sierra Pacific Airlines. The airline continued to operate under several newer owners with a fleet of Convair prop-jets and Boeing 737 jets.

In 1972, he received a patent for a special widescreen 3-D camera lens for modern 35mm and 70mm reflex motion picture cameras.

During the 1970s, his lenses were used in Andy Warhol's Frankenstein, Dynasty, and Fantastic Invasion of Planet Earth.

== Credits ==
- The Stewardesses (filmed in Stereovision 3D) (1969)
- The Volcano Creature (co-producer)
- The CIA Girls of Capitol Hill (co-producer)
- Mr. Howard's Crazy Airline (co-producer)
- The Wild Ride (co-producer and director of 3D photography)
- The Volcano Creature and Surfer Girls (co-producer and director of 3D photography)
- Magda The Gypsy Fortune Teller co-produced with Gary Tomsic and Herb Liteman (filmed in Stereovision 3D) (1999)
- Jaws 3-D (Cinematographer and Chief 3-D Consultant) 1983
