= Sierra Pacific Airlines =

Airline of the United States

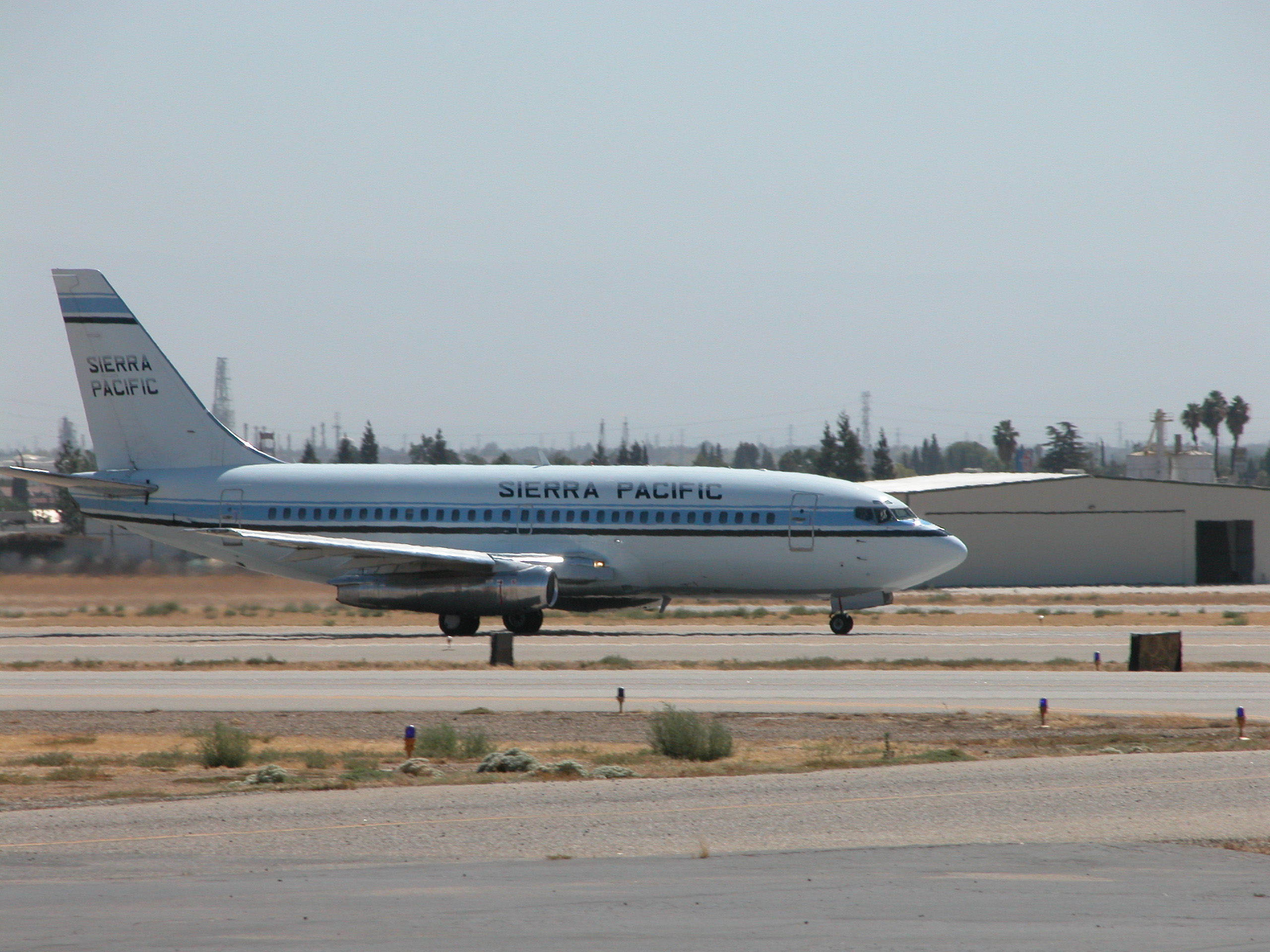
- 737-200 of Sierra Pacific
IATA	ICAO	Call sign
SI	SPA	SIERRA PACIFIC
- Founded: 1970; 56 years ago (as Trans Sierra Airlines in California); 1971; 55 years ago(renamed Sierra Pacific Airlines)
- AOC #: SPAA024B
- Hubs: Tucson International Airport
- Secondary hubs: Yuma International Airport
- Fleet size: 2
- Parent company: Sierra Pacific Group
- Headquarters: Tucson, Arizona, United States
- Key people: Gar Thorsrud
- Founder: Chris Condon, Allan Silliphant

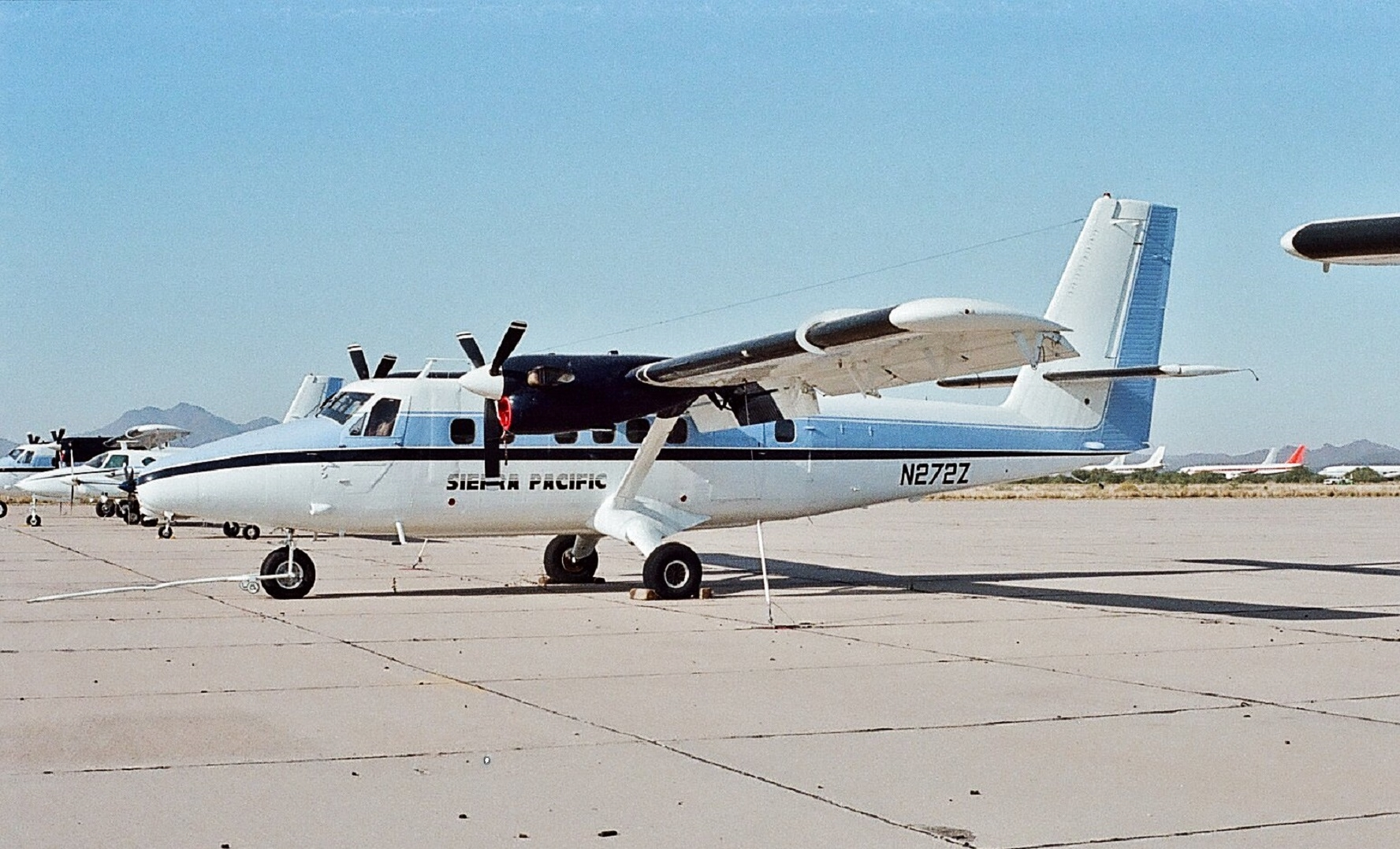
de Havilland Canada DHC-6-300 Twin Otter of Sierra Pacific Airlines at Marana/Pinal, 1982

Sierra Pacific Airlines is an American charter airline based in Tucson, Arizona, United States. It operates passenger charters and sub-charters for other airlines, as well as for the United States Forest Service, United States Military and the United States Marshals Service with jet aircraft. Sierra Pacific also previously operated scheduled passenger service in the western U.S. with prop and turboprop aircraft.

== History ==
The airline was initially founded as Trans Sierra Airlines in 1970 by Chris Condon and Allan Silliphant with profits from their box office hit soft X and later R rated 3D film The Stewardesses. It was renamed Sierra Pacific Airlines when the FAA granted permission to operate aircraft weighing over 12,500 lbs. in 1971. Using Aspen Airways as an aspirational model, the original aircraft were one four-passenger, normally aspirated twin engine Piper Aztec, two eight-passenger turbo-charged twin engine Cessna 402s, followed by the 1973 post ski season introduction of a 44-passenger Convair 440 twin radial engine airliner. The aircraft were operated out of Hollywood Burbank Airport in southern California. Destinations served included Burbank (BUR), Las Vegas (LAS), Los Angeles (LAX), Fresno (FAT), Bishop (BIH), Mammoth Lakes (MMH) and San Jose (SJC). In 1973, Sierra Pacific was purchased by Mammoth Mountain Ski Area. During the winter ski season of 1975–1976, the airline was flying nonstop service from Mammoth Lakes to Los Angeles, Las Vegas and Fresno with direct, one stop service to Burbank with 50 passenger seat Convair 580 turboprops and 19 passenger seat Handley Page Jetstream turboprops.

Sierra Pacific also flew de Havilland Canada DHC-6 Twin Otter aircraft as a scheduled intrastate State of California Public Utilities Commission airline while also having interstate CAB exemption to cross state lines.

In April 1978, Mammoth Mountain agreed to sell Sierra Pacific to Tucson-based Mountain West Aviation, whose president was Gar Thorsrud. The deal was finalized in July.

It is wholly owned by the Sierra Pacific Group.

From November, 1986 through September, 1988, Sierra Pacific operated two Convair 580 aircraft for Trans-Colorado Airlines which in turn was operating as Continental Express on behalf of Continental Airlines. The aircraft flew scheduled Continental Express flights from Denver to several cities in Colorado, Idaho and Wyoming. During a brief period in the spring of 1987, the Convairs also flew from Albuquerque to Farmington, NM and Tucson, AZ. The Convair 580's were painted in full Continental Airlines colors.

Until his death in November 2014, the long-time President of Sierra Pacific was Garfield Thorsrud, the founder of Mountain West Aviation. Thorsrud was a smokejumper early in his career and later served in the CIA, including with Intermountain Aviation.

== Fleet ==
As of August 2025, Sierra Pacific Airlines operates the following aircraft:

Sierra Pacific Airlines fleet
Aircraft	In fleet	Orders	Notes
Boeing 737-500	2	—	
Total	2	—	

Aircraft types operated by Sierra Pacific in the past included the Cessna 402 twin prop, the Convair 440 twin engine propliner, the Convair 580 turboprop, the de Havilland Canada DHC-6 Twin Otter turboprop and the Handley Page Jetstream (model HP.137) turboprop as well as the Boeing 737-200 jetliner.

== Destinations in 1976 ==
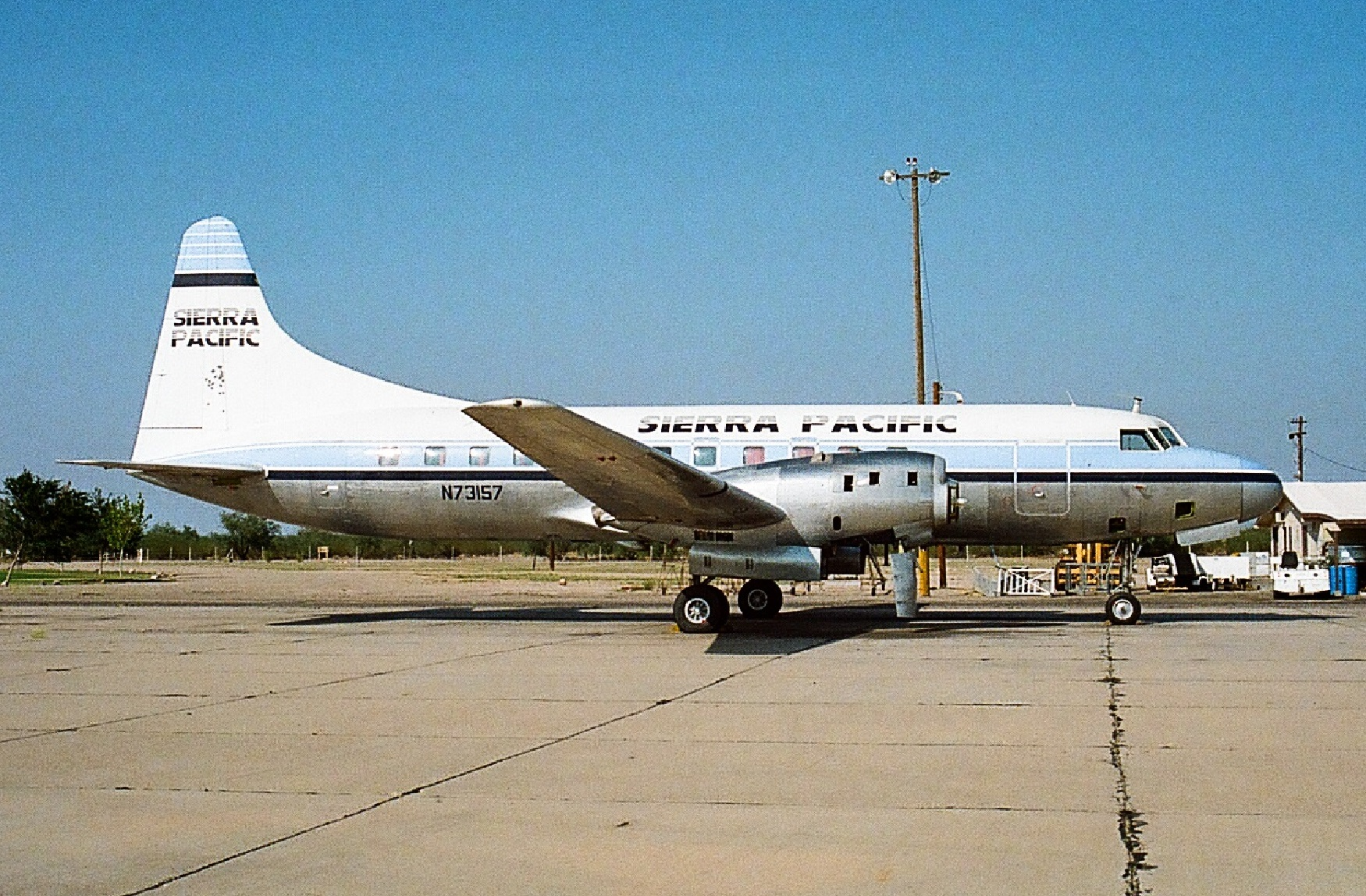
Convair CV-580 at Marana/Pinal, 1987

According to its November 22, 1976, system timetable, Sierra Pacific was operating scheduled passenger service flown with Convair 580 and Handley Page Jetstream turboprop aircraft to the following destinations:

- Bishop, CA (BIH)
- Fresno, CA (FAT)
- Los Angeles (LAX)
- Mammoth Lakes, CA (MMH)
- Reno, NV (RNO)

The airline also served Burbank, CA (BUR) and Las Vegas, NV (LAS) earlier in 1976.

== Accidents ==
- March 13, 1974 – Sierra Pacific Convair 440 N-4819C crashed into mountains shortly after takeoff from Bishop, California, killing all on board, four crew and 32 passengers. A film crew for Wolper Productions filming a Bell Telephone Hour special about Ice Age Neanderthal cavemen filmed at Mammoth Mountain Ski Area, was killed, though David L. Wolper was not on board. The filmed segment was recovered in the tail section wreckage and was broadcast as the television documentary Primal Man. The National Transportation Safety Board was unable to determine a probable cause. It was dark but clear, both captain and first officer had flown from Bishop before, including in the dark, so were aware of the high terrain, and the investigation was unable to find any mechanical reason.
