= Sierra Pacific Airlines Flight 802 =

March 1974 plane crash near Bishop, California

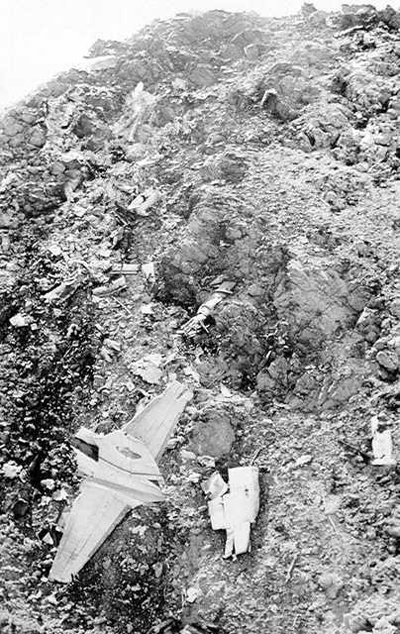
- Wreckage of N4819C, the Convair CV-440 involved in the crash

Accident
- Date: March 13, 1974
- Summary: Controlled flight into terrain, cause undetermined
- Site: 5.2 mi SE of Eastern Sierra Regional Airport (Bishop Airport), Inyo County, California, United States; 37°19′57″N 118°21′43″W

Aircraft
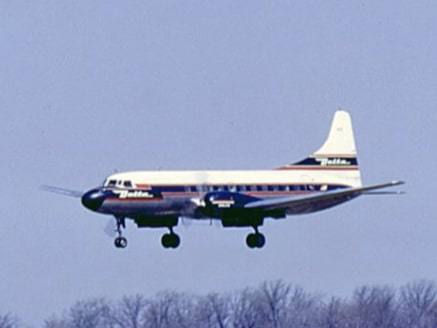
- N4819C, the aircraft involved while still in service with Delta Air Lines in 1968
- Aircraft type: Convair CV-440 Metropolitan
- Operator: Sierra Pacific Airlines
- Registration: N4819C
- Flight origin: Eastern Sierra Regional Airport, Inyo County, California
- Destination: Hollywood Burbank Airport, Burbank, California
- Occupants: 36
- Passengers: 32
- Crew: 4
- Fatalities: 36
- Survivors: 0

Sierra Pacific Airlines Flight 802 was a charter flight from Bishop, California to Burbank, California that crashed into the White Mountains on the evening of March 13, 1974. The aircraft, carrying a movie production crew, crashed for undetermined reasons, killing all 36 occupants on board. To this day, the crash remains one of only three aviation accidents to be unsolved by the National Transportation Safety Board (NTSB), and it stands as the fourth-deadliest crash of a Convair CV-440 to date.

== Background ==
=== Aircraft ===
The aircraft involved in the crash was a Convair 340/440-38, registered as N4189C. It was purchased by Sierra Pacific Airlines from Aspen Airways on November 11, 1973. Its first flight was in 1953 and it had accrued 41,112 flight hours prior to the accident flight. Its last major inspection was on January 31, 1974. The plane was fitted with two Pratt & Whitney R-2800 Double Wasp engines. The plane did not have a flight data recorder (FDR) nor a cockpit voice recorder (CVR) installed, nor was it required to.

=== Flight crew ===
Captain Albert J. Evans (age 50) had been employed by Sierra Pacific Airlines since September 9, 1973. He had 9,902 flight hours, 1,742 of which were on Convair 240/340/440 aircraft. He also held ratings on the Douglas DC-3 and Martin 202/404. He had flown into Bishop eight times before the accident. Three of those trips were conducted at night and three were in the 90 days preceding the accident.

First officer Paul T. Dennis (age 26) had been employed by Sierra Pacific Airlines since October 15, 1973. He had 2,845 flight hours, 2,500 of which were on Convair 340/440 aircraft. He had flown into Bishop five times in the previous 90 days, one of which was at night. Dennis had been ill with the flu for the four days prior to reporting for duty on the morning of March 13.

There was an observer pilot on board, Howard R. West (age 45). He was a pilot-in-command trainee with Sierra Pacific Airlines. He held ratings on Convair 240/340/440 aircraft. He had 8,831 flight hours, 5,992 of which were in Convair aircraft. West had occupied the jumpseat five times before the day of the accident, but had not flown into Bishop before the evening of March 13.

There was one flight attendant, Mary Joanne Parker (age 19). She had been employed by Sierra Pacific Airlines since November 14, 1973.

== Accident ==
=== Background ===
The flight was chartered by Wolper Productions, owned by David L. Wolper, to transport actors and a film crew from Mammoth Lakes to Burbank. The crew was shooting an episode entitled "The Struggle for Survival" for the television special "Primal Man." Filming occurred from March 11–13 at the Mammoth Mountain Ski Area and Sierra Pacific Airlines was chartered to return the film crew to Burbank for filming in Malibu on the morning of March 15.

The plane used for the charter, N4819C, a Convair CV-440 Metropolitan, was scheduled for a passenger flight from Burbank to Mammoth Yosemite Airport at 3:45 p.m. on March 13 before performing the charter flight. However, a blown fuse in the generator on N4819C caused delays. By 5:30 p.m., the fuse had been fixed, but because of the late hour, a night takeoff would have been necessary from the Mammoth airport. The airport was restricted to daylight operations only, so Flight 802 was rescheduled to pick up the film crew at Eastern Sierra Regional Airport, 45 miles south of Mammoth Lakes.

=== Accident sequence ===
At 7:10 p.m., the flight crew contacted the Tonapah Flight Service Station (FSS) to cancel their visual flight rules (VFR) plan and file an instrument flight rules (IFR) plan for the trip from Bishop to Burbank with an estimated departure time of 8:00 p.m. The plane landed in Bishop from Burbank at 7:20 p.m. There were no reported issues with the plane. The baggage and film equipment were loaded onto the plane and loading was supervised by the observer pilot, Howard R. West.

Flight 802 departed the gate at 8:20 p.m and departed from runway 12 shortly after. At 8:21 p.m., the crew requested for their IFR clearance to be activated. The Tonapah FSS advised that they would have to call back with the clearance. At 8:24 p.m., the pilots reported to Tonapah FSS that they were "climbing VFR over Bishop, awaiting clearance." At 8:28:40 p.m., the Tonapah FSS specialist tried to radio the flight, but could not make contact. Repeated attempts to contact the flight were unsuccessful. At 8:36 p.m., the manager of Eastern Sierra Regional Airport called Tonapah FSS and requested the status of Flight 802, noting that they had received reports of an explosion and fire in the White Mountains east of the airport. The FSS specialist concluded an accident had occurred. The plane had struck the northern slope of a mountain ridge 5.2 miles from the airport at an elevation of about 6,100 ft.

Ground witnesses observed the plane shortly before it crashed. The plane was seen to be proceeding in a southerly direction parallel to the mountain range. The engines were maintaining a smooth and steady sound and the plane appeared to be gradually climbing. There were no witnesses present to observe the initial takeoff or initial climb-out. All witnesses noted that it was a very dark night, that there was no moon, and that the mountains were not discernible from the night sky.

Mike Antonio, a pilot for the Western Helicopter Company, and Dr. Dave Sheldon, a doctor, flew to the scene of the crash. Antonio and Sheldon found the plane to be obliterated. The two spent 30 minutes looking for survivors, but none were to be found. Officials from the Federal Aviation Authority (FAA), the Inyo County coroner's office, and the Federal Bureau of Investigation (FBI) helped move the bodies to a makeshift mortuary in Bishop for identification.

== Investigation ==
All occupants of the plane died from traumatic injuries. Autopsies were performed on the crew, and toxicological tests revealed no evidence of drugs, carbon monoxide, or alcohol. The first officer's stomach was completely empty. Investigators deemed the accident unsurvivable. There was no evidence of any malfunction of aircraft structures or systems prior to impact.

Exactly when the plane took off and crashed is unclear. Investigators determined that the plane could have been airborne for no more than 6 minutes (from 8:22 p.m. to 8:28 p.m.). There existed no specific climb-out procedures from Eastern Sierra Regional Airport in the Sierra Pacific Airlines' operation manual, but many company pilots stated that an initial right turn towards Bishop and away from the mountains was typical.

The airport had no distance measuring equipment (DME) at the time of the crash. Because of the mountainous terrain near the airport, the IFR climb-out procedure required a visual climb to 8,000 ft within 2 nautical miles of the airport. Because there was no DME equipment at the airport, pilots had to remain vigilant with these instructions to stay clear of the terrain. The pilots carried out a VFR climb-out because of the 30 mile visibility conditions of the night, even though it was extremely dark. If the actual visibility had been 2 nautical miles or less, an IFR departure would have been required.

It is unclear why the crew decided to fly east towards the mountainous terrain instead of staying west towards the town of Bishop in the valley. It is believed that the excellent visibility (darkness notwithstanding) created a degree of crew complacency in adherence to the distance restriction from the airport during the climb.

It is possible that a distraction occurred which drew the crew's attention away from the aircraft during the climb. However, because there were no mechanical issues with the plane, no logical reason for this laxity could be found. The first officer's previous illness, empty stomach, and fatigue may have caused his performance to be degraded. The observer-pilot may also have provided a distraction for the captain and the first officer.

=== Findings ===
1. The aircraft was certified and maintained properly.

2. The crew members were certified and qualified properly.

3. The aircraft weight and balance were within prescribed limits.

4. The flight departed runway 12 and advised the Tonapah FSS that they were climbing under visual flight rules while awaiting IFR clearance.

5. There was no company prescribed VFR departure procedure for Bishop Airport.

6. The flight maintained a right-turn pattern around the airport.

7. The aircraft struck a mountain side at an elevation of 6,100 feet and 5.2 statute miles southeast of the Bishop Airport.

8. Both engines were developing near maximum continuous power at impact.

9. There was no malfunction with the aircraft or its components.

10. The accident occurred during the hours of darkness before moon rise.

11. The mountains to the east of Bishop were not discernible against the sky.

12. The captain and the first officer had flown into the Bishop Airport on several occasions within the 6-month period preceding the accident.

13. The first officer was most probably in a fatigued condition as a result of the after effects of the flu virus, a long duty day, and a lack of food.

=== Probable cause and recommendations ===
The NTSB was "unable to determine the probable cause of this accident. The reason why the flight crew did not maintain a safe distance from hazardous terrain during night visual flight conditions could not be established."

The NTSB put forth the following recommendations to the Federal Aviation Administration (FAA):

1. Install a DME, cochanneled and collocated with the Bishop VOR.

2. Study the feasibility of an IFR climb procedure to the northwest of the Bishop VOR using a designated radial and the DME.

3. Require that all nighttime departures and arrivals at the Bishop Airport be conducted in accordance with the prescribed IFR procedures.

== Notable fatalities ==
- Janos Prohaska, a Hungarian-American actor and stunt performer, and his son, Robert Prohaska
- Rolf J. Miller, an Emmy-nominated make-up artist for his work on Bewitched in 1971

== See also ==
- List of accidents and incidents involving the Convair CV-240 family
