= Coffee, Tea or Me? =

1967 book by Donald Bain

Coffee, Tea or Me? — The Uninhibited Memoirs of Two Airline Stewardesses
- Bantam Books first paperback edition
- Author: "Trudy Baker & Rachel Jones", Donald Bain
- Illustrator: Bill Wenzel
- Language: English language
- Genre: Novel
- Publisher: Bartholomew House
- Publication date: 1967
- Publication place: United States
- Media type: Print (hardback & paperback)
- ISBN: 0-14-200351-4
- OCLC: 51728805
- Dewey Decimal: 387.7/42/0922 21
- LC Class: HD6073.A43 B34 2003

Coffee, Tea or Me? is a book of purported memoirs by the fictitious stewardesses Trudy Baker and Rachel Jones, written by the initially uncredited Donald Bain and first published in 1967. The book depicts the anecdotal lives of two lusty young stewardesses, and was originally presented as factual.

== Publishing history ==
Donald Bain revealed in his 2002 memoir Every Midget Has an Uncle Sam Costume: Writing for a Living that he wrote Coffee, Tea or Me? and three sequels while employed as a New York City–based American Airlines public relations person. The publisher hired two Eastern Airlines stewardesses to pose as the authors for book tours and television appearances. As The New York Times columnist Joe Sharkey described in 2010,

An editor at a publishing house introduced him to two Eastern Airlines stewardesses who thought they together might be able to write a book about their escapades. The editor thought Don might want to be the ghostwriter for the two women. But when Don sat down with them, they didn't have much to offer besides a few anecdotes. "I realized they didn't have enough to sustain a book, and I was going to have to use an awful lot of my own imagination," he told me then. Nevertheless, he was inspired by the idea. So he created a "memoir" out of whole cloth. The book shot onto the best-seller list, and the two stewardesses were delighted to go on the road to publicize it as the authors—even though their real names were not on the cover. Bedazzled by fame, "one of them legally changed her real name to the one I had given her on the book," Bain told me.

Bain himself said, "I wrote it in 1966 while working in public relations for American Airlines, and it went on to spawn an entire genre of wacky comedies, including three direct sequels. All in all, the four books sold more than five million copies worldwide, and became my annuity for almost 17 years."

The first edition hardcover was published in October 1967 by Bartholomew House, an imprint of Bartell Media Corporation, with a second printing in December, and a third in January 1968. Bantam Books, at that time a subsidiary of Grosset & Dunlap, released a paperback edition in November 1968, and had reached its tenth printing by January 1969. Bain was uncredited other than in a dedication, until the 2003 edition, in which he was credited beneath the Baker and Jones byline as "with Donald Bain."

The Penguin Group, the publisher as of the 21st century, describes the book as "adult fiction".

== Style and content ==
Written in the first person voice of Trudy Baker, with Bain's name appearing as a dedication between the list of chapters and the foreword, the book describes a kind of glamorous lifestyle from the stewardess' point of view, working for two years for an unnamed American carrier out of a New York crew base during the golden age of airline travel.

It is written to emphasize the sexy parts of the job, although difficult experiences are also recounted, and reflects the shifts in society and culture then underway. Illustrations by men's-magazine cartoonist Bill Wenzel depict the flight attendants and female passengers as busty sexpots.

The book contains period references to television shows such as Batman and lists of celebrities the authors claim to have carried on their flights, as well as an incidental description of the airline introducing Boeing 727 service. Other equipment mentioned includes the Boeing 707 and the smaller BAC 111. People's names are fictitious, excepting the famous, and there is no way to gauge the accuracy of any of the accounts.

== Sequels and spinoffs ==
Capitalizing on the success of the publication, Bain wrote three sequels: The Coffee Tea or Me Girls' Round-the-World Diary (1969), The Coffee, Tea or Me Girls Lay It on the Line (1972) and The Coffee, Tea or Me Girls Get Away from It All (1974). A TV film of the same title, loosely based on Coffee, Tea or Me? was made in 1973.

The Jaggerz' #2 hit "The Rapper" from 1970 contains the line "Come up to my place for some coffee, or tea, or me." The phrase is also mentioned in the 1978 Skyhooks song "Women in Uniform" and the 1988 film Working Girl.

The book's title lent itself to a 2002 documentary of the same name, with the subtitle The Surprising Story of the Underestimated Trolley Dolly, which interviewed air hostesses who worked in the New Zealand airline industry in the 1960s and 1970s.

== See also ==
- Boeing-Boeing, 1962 play
  - Boeing Boeing, 1965 film version of the play
- Come Fly with Me, 1963 film
- The Stewardesses, 1969 film
