= Macfadden Communications Group =

American publisher

- Founded: 1898; 128 years ago
- Founder: Bernarr Macfadden
- Country of origin: United States
- Headquarters location: New York City, New York, U.S.
- Publication types: Magazines
- Official website: www.macfad.com

Macfadden Communications Group is a publisher of business magazines. It has a historical link with a company started in 1898 by Bernarr Macfadden that was one of the largest magazine publishers of the twentieth century.

== History ==
=== Macfadden Publications ===
Physical Culture, Bernarr Macfadden's first magazine though the company Macfadden Publications (originally The Macfadden Company, Inc.), was based on Macfadden's interest in bodybuilding. The launch of True Story in 1919 made the company very successful. Other well-known magazines, such as Photoplay and True Detective, soon followed. Macfadden also launched the tabloid New York Evening Graphic. Bernarr Macfadden withdrew from his leadership roles with the company in 1941.

=== Macfadden-Bartell ===
In 1961, the Bartell Broadcasting Corporation bought a controlling share in Macfadden and merged with the company, forming Macfadden-Bartell. Bartell owned WADO New York, WOKY Milwaukee, and KCBQ San Diego. A share in Bartell was acquired by Downe Communications in 1967, with full control in 1969. Between 1969 and 1974 Downe was acquired by Charter Company. Bartell was fully acquired by Downe in 1976, and Downe was fully acquired by Charter in 1978.

Downe purchased the newspaper supplement Family Weekly in 1966, and the Ladies' Home Journal and The American Home from the Curtis Publishing Company in 1968.

=== Macfadden Group ===
Macfadden's women's magazines were spun off in 1975, and sold to the unit president, Peter J. Callahan. These magazines were:

- True Story
- Photoplay
- TV-Radio Mirror
- True Confessions
- Motion Picture
- True Romance
- True Experience
- True Love

Us was purchased in 1980, and sold in 1986. In the mid-eighties, Macfadden bought the Ideal Publishing Company, which published Teen Beat and other fan magazines, from Filmways. MacFadden acquired a stake in what would become American Media in 1989 when it bought a stake in the National Enquirer.

=== Sterling/Macfadden ===
In 1991, the Macfadden consumer magazines were spun off and merged with Sterling's Magazines. Sterling's published fan magazines such as Tiger Beat, as well as the music magazine Metal Edge. The merger was finalized in October 1992. In 1998, the conglomerate's line of youth music publications was sold to Primedia (now Rent Group); the rest were bought by Dorchester Media in 2004.

==== Teen Magazines ====
- Right On!
- Teen Beat
- 16 Magazine
- Tiger Beat
- Teen

=== Macfadden Holdings ===
The trade magazines Chief Executive and Discount Merchandiser, as well as the company's stake in American Media, remained a separate company. American Media was sold in 1999 to the investment group Evercore Partners. The Macfadden trade titles were sold to VNU the same year.

=== Present day ===
The executives of Macfadden Business Communications started a new company using the Macfadden name. It is a publisher of business-to-business magazines.

No publications of Macfadden Communications Group have updated since early January, 2025.

== Historical publications ==
=== Magazines ===
Sources:

- Physical Culture
- True Story (1919–2004)
- Brain Power (1922–24) (also titled National Pictorial Brain Power Magazine)
- True Experiences (1922-
- True Romances (1923-
- Love and Romance (1923-
- Muscle Builder (1924-
- True Detective (1924–1971)
- Master Detective (1930-
- Famous Detective Cases
- True Love
- True Love Stories (1924-
- True Marriage Stories (1924-
- Modern Marriage
- Own Your Own Home
- Your Faith
- Your Home
- Dream World (also titled Dream World: Love and Romance)
- Ghost Stories (1926–32) (under Harold Hersey's control 1930–32)
- Macfadden's Fiction Lovers' Magazine (1923–1925)
  - known as Metropolitan Magazine (1895–1923) before purchase by Macfadden
- Midnight (also titled Midnight Mysteries)
- The Dance Magazine
- Climax: Exciting Stories for Men
- Photoplay (1934–1980)
- Secrets (1936-
- Personal Romances (1937-
- Movie Mirror
- Radio Mirror (19xx-1948)
  - renamed Radio and Television Mirror by no later than January 1941
  - renamed TV Radio Mirror (1949–1977)
- Saga: Adventure Stories for Men (195x-198x)
- True Confessions (1963–1992)
- Motion Picture Magazine (1911–1977)
- Sport (1946–1975)
- Intimate Stories (1948-
- Revealing Romances (1949-
- Pageant (1961–1977)
- Liberty (1931–1950)
- Home Furnishings News (2006–2014) also known as HFN
- Dance Magazine (2001–2016)
- Dance Spirit (2006–2016)
- Dance Teacher (2006–2016)
- Pointe (2006–2016)
- Dance Retailer News (2006–2016)
- Grocery Headquarters (2004–2017)

=== Newspapers ===
- New York Graphic (1924–1932)
- Philadelphia Daily News (1925–1932)
- Detroit Daily
- Detroit Mirror (? – 1931)

=== Teck Publishing Corporation (1931–1938) ===
- Amazing Stories
- Radio News
- Wild West Stories & Complete Novel Magazine

== Bartholomew House imprint ==
Macfadden also published a few hardcover books through the years, under the imprint Bartholomew House. Initially a way to group together stories from Macfadden's magazines into a book (as in Great Western Heroes, Great Pioneer Heroes), the imprint expanded into first editions of new material after the purchase by the Bartell Group (Coffee, Tea or Me?, "Say ... Didn’t You Used to Be George Murphy?").

- 1950 - Magic Cook Book: The Key to Kitchen Economy, prepared by the Food Editors of True Story Magazine
- 1957 - Great Western Heroes: Six True Stories of the Men Who Tamed the West, edited by Rafer Brent
- 1958 - Great Pioneer Heroes: True Stories of the Men Who Made America, edited by Rafer Brent
- 1966 - Ecstasy and Me: My Life as a Woman by Hedy Lamarr (ghostwritten by Leo Guild and Cy Rice)
- 1967 - Coffee, Tea or Me?: The Uninhibited Memoirs of Two Airline Stewardesses by Trudy Baker and Rachel Jones (ghostwritten by Donald Bain)
- 1968 - The CanniBal$: a Novel About Television's Savage Chieftains by Keefe Brasselle
- 1969 - Mannequin: My Life as a Model by Carolyn Kenmore (ghostwritten by William Dufty)
- 1970 - "Say ... Didn’t You Used to Be George Murphy?" by George Murphy (with Victor Lasky)

== Current publications ==
- Pet Business (purchased in 2000)
