= KBIH =

KBIH may refer to:

- Eastern Sierra Regional Airport (ICAO code KBIH)
- KBIH-LP, a low-power radio station (94.1 FM) licensed to serve Houston, Texas, United States
