= Come Fly with Me (film) =

1963 British comedy film by Henry Levin

- Directed by: Henry Levin
- Written by: William Roberts
- Story by: William Roberts
- Based on: Girl on a Wing; 1960 novel by Bernard Glemser
- Produced by: Anatole de Grunwald
- Starring: Dolores Hart; Hugh O'Brian; Karlheinz Böhm; Pamela Tiffin; Lois Nettleton; Dawn Addams; Karl Malden
- Cinematography: Oswald Morris
- Edited by: Frank Clarke
- Music by: Lyn Murray
- Distributed by: Metro-Goldwyn-Mayer
- Release dates: 27 March 1963 (U.S.); 18 April 1963 (UK)
- Running time: 109 min.
- Country: United Kingdom
- Language: English

Come Fly with Me is a 1963 British Jet Age romantic comedy film directed by Henry Levin and released by MGM. Featuring an ensemble cast of Dolores Hart, Hugh O'Brian, Karlheinz Böhm, Pamela Tiffin, Karl Malden, and Lois Nettleton, it is based on Bernard Glemser's 1960 chick-lit novel Girl on a Wing, which was published again in 1969 under the title The Fly Girls. It follows three young international air hostesses looking for romance and excitement, weaving abundant soap opera elements into its tale of opportunity for glamorous travel and adventures with men that came with being an airline hostess.

It was the last feature film of Dolores Hart.

== Plot ==
On her first day on the New York-Paris route with Polar-Atlantic international airlines, accident-prone stewardess Carol Brewster locks herself in a restroom and delays departure. Flustered, Carol forgets to check the cockpit, locking the pilots out of the plane. Flight engineer Teddy Shepherd plays a practical joke on her that keeps Carol busy rushing back and forth flushing toilets "to relieve the plane's hydrostatic pressure" until copilot Ray Winsley reveals the joke.

Carol tells Donna Stewart that she is attracted to Ray; Donna aspires to affluence, which excludes airline personnel. Ray invites Carol to dinner, canceling the date when he gets a message from a persistent married girlfriend, Katie Rinard.

A suave foreign passenger responds to Donna's routine "may I tempt you?" with a hackneyed line. Donna thanks him cooly but wishes him better luck next time; her attitude changes when another attendant refers to him as "Baron Von Elzingen".

Walter Lucas intercedes when an obnoxious drunken passenger persistently hits on Hilda Bergstrom (Bergie). She accepts his invitation to dine but is appalled to learn that Carol and Donna have urged an economy class passenger to take her to a chic, expensive restaurant. Learning Bergie formerly was a waitress, Walter says Bergie reminds him of his late his wife, who died four months ago, who had been a waitress. He is traveling to cope with grief. Sensing unrealistic expectations, Bergie cuts the date short.

When Katie's husband comes to the hotel looking for her, Carol warns Ray and Katie, then curls up on the bed in Katie's place. The husband knocks Ray down, then sees Carol, apologizes, and leaves. Ray thanks Carol for her help, but Carol is disappointed in his shabby "values". Ray gets demoted to flying backwater air charters for the airline because of his misadventures with love.

Landing on a Paris flight, the Baron notices police and leaves his gold cigarette case on his seat with a note for Donna to meet him at a cafe. He is using Donna as a "mule" to unknowingly smuggle stolen diamonds, concealed in the case. When Donna returns his cigarette case, the Baron surreptitiously slips it to an accomplice. Wishing to continue to use Donna, he gives her an "heirloom" necklace. When Donna is reluctant to accept, he suggests she thank him by bringing back a carton of his favorite cigarettes. Still unaware, Donna makes trips back and forth to Vienna transporting concealed diamonds.

At the hotel in Paris, the three stewardesses are led to a luxury suite, which Donna lords over the others as the Baron's lavishing on her. Walter admits he sprung for it, and Bergie chastises him for wasting money he cannot afford. He admits that he has $40 million. (Note: $40 million then is worth ten times that in the 2020s.) Now fearing that he is looking for a "joyride" instead of a wife, Bergie chases him out.

Reinstated in his old job, Ray consoles a crying child traveling alone by taking him to the cockpit to "fly the airplane." Carol encourages the passengers to fill out cards to praise Ray to the airline. The airline is skeptical of blatant solicitation.

In a change of heart, the Baron insists to his overlord that he is through using Donna as his mule. Donna is apprehended at airport customs and charged with smuggling stolen diamonds. Temporarily released by the police as a cat's paw, she meets the Baron at an out-of-the-way cafe. He tries to placate her with money for a good attorney, but she refuses it, then returns the necklace he gifted her. Leaving in disgust, she sees a police car staking them out and believes the Baron is giving himself up. She kisses him goodbye using his preferred farewell, "Auf Wiedersehen". (Note: In English, it can be translated as "until we see each other again".) Before her flight can leave Vienna, an emissary of the Baron returns the necklace with the message "Auf Wiedersehen."

On board, the women discover that the plane is empty – but for Walter in economy class. The destination is wherever Bergie wants to go, as long as she would like. Carol goes to the cockpit, but before she can deliver another lecture to Ray on "values" he straps her into a jump seat, gags her, and offers her a marriage proposal.

== Cast ==
- Dolores Hart as Donna Stuart
- Hugh O'Brian as First Officer Ray Winsley (Co-Pilot)
- Karlheinz Böhm as Baron Franz Von Elzingen (credited as Karl Boehm)
- Pamela Tiffin as Carol Brewster
- Karl Malden as Walter Lucas
- Lois Nettleton as Hilda "Bergie" Bergstrom
- Dawn Addams as Katie Rinard
- Victor Rietti as Passenger (cameo)
- John Crawford as Pilot
- Andrew Cruickshank as Cardwell
- James Dobson as Flight Engineer Teddy Shepard
- Robert Easton as Navigator
- Maurice Marsac as Monsieur Rinard
- Lois Maxwell as Gwen Sandley
- Richard Wattis as Oliver Garson
- Guido Wieland as Vienna Policeman

== Production ==
The film was one of a series of MGM follow ups to Where the Boys Are. It was based on a 1960 novel by Bernard Glemser, Girl on a Wing, though the source material was significantly shortened, with two principal characters omitted. Henry Levin was signed to direct in April 1962. Ann-Margret, originally announced among the cast members, was later dropped when her character was written out. Mariette Hartley was initially given the role of Bergie, but pulled out of the project following a misdiagnosis of hepatitis. In preparation for their roles, Hart and Tiffin took courses at New York's Grace Downs Airline School.

Filming started in June 1962. The film was known in production as Champagne Flight, The Friendliest Girls in the World and Girl on a Wing.

The film was shot in Panavision and Metrocolor during 1962 in New York City, Paris, Versailles, Vienna, and the Woerthersee with studio interiors shot at MGM British Studios in Borehamwood, England. The shoot took 12 weeks.

It filmed at the same time as Follow the Boys.

It premiered in the United States on 27 March 1963.

Glemsser wrote a follow-up novel in 1972, titled The Super-Jet Girls. It was not made into a film.

== Critical reception ==
Variety gave the film a mixed review, writing, "Sometimes one performance can save a picture and in Come Fly with Me it's an engaging and infectious one by Pamela Tiffin. The production has other things going for it like an attractive cast, slick pictorial values and smart, stylish direction by Henry Levin, but at the base of all this sheer sheen lies a frail, frivolous and featherweight storyline that, in trying to take itself too seriously, flies into dramatic air pockets and crosscurrents that threaten to send the entire aircraft into a tailspin."

== See also ==
- Boeing-Boeing, 1962 play
  - Boeing Boeing, 1965 film version of the play
- Coffee, Tea or Me?, 1967 novel
- The Stewardesses, 1969 film
- Flying High, 1978 TV series
- The Crew, 1995 TV series
- View from the Top, 2003 film
- Pan Am, 2011 TV series
