= Bill Wenzel =

American cartoonist (1918–1987)

Page of Wenzel original art. Cigarette girl: "$1.00 a pack ... $100 if you pick them up at my place after 2 a.m."

William Michael Wenzel (January 22, 1918 – May 12, 1987) was an American cartoonist best known as a widely published good girl artist for men's magazines.

== Biography ==
Bill Wenzel was born in Irvington, New Jersey and grew up in nearby Union Township. His parents were from Hungary. In 1941 Wenzel was drafted into the Army.

His bawdy cartoon spot illustrations were published over the course of several decades, from such publications as Judge in the 1940s to Sex to Sexty in the 1960s and 1970s, and particularly for the Humorama division of publisher Martin Goodman's variously titled corporations. Wenzel's work, which featured busty, big-eyed, yet innocently risque young women, was published in such magazines and digests as Gaze, Joker, Jest, Comedy, and Stare. Most captions were written by the artist himself. In 1967 Wenzel drew illustrations for the book Coffee, Tea or Me? that, according to the author Donald Bain, "contributed significantly to the book's success".

In 1979, after having lived almost 30 years in Atlantic Highlands, New Jersey, Wenzel and his family moved to Naples, Florida, where he died in 1987 of lung cancer.
