= True Detective (magazine) =

American true crime magazine

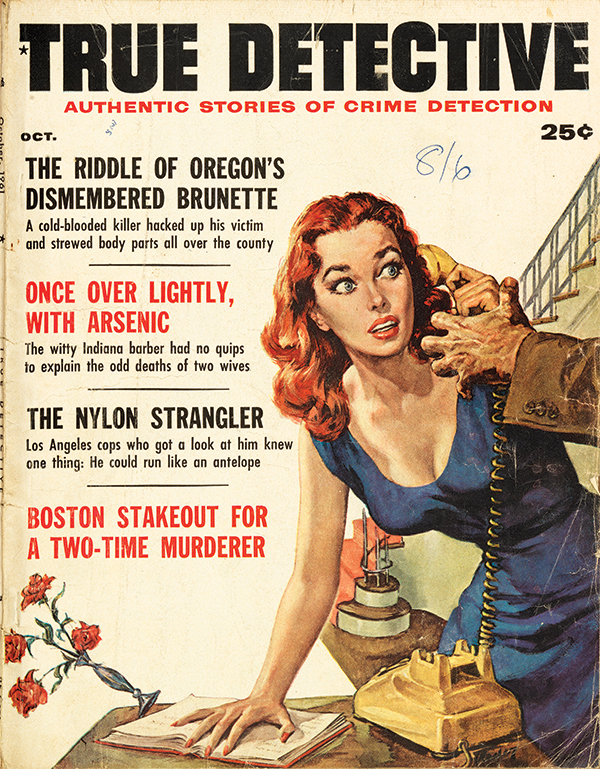
- Cover of the October 1961 issue of True Detective
- Categories: Crime stories
- Publisher: Macfadden Publications (1924–1971); Rees Communications (1971–1995); Globe Communications (1995)
- Founder: Bernarr Macfadden
- Founded: 1924
- Language: English
- ISSN: 0041-350X

True Detective (originally True Detective Mysteries) was an American true crime magazine published from 1924 to 1995. It initiated the true crime magazine genre, and during its peak from the 1940s to the early 1960s it sold millions of copies and spawned numerous imitators. For most of its run, it was published by Macfadden Publications.

== History ==
True Detective Mysteries was founded in 1924 by publisher Bernarr Macfadden. It initially focused on mystery fiction, with a mix of non-fiction crime stories. In the 1930s, Macfadden realized the popularity of the non-fiction pieces and gradually phased out fiction. As such, True Detective Mysteries became the first true crime magazine. In 1941, Macfadden changed the name to True Detective, emphasizing the magazine's move away from mystery fiction.

True Detective's non-fiction stories retained some of the tone and style of noir fiction and mystery writing, laying the ground for subsequent true crime genre conventions. The magazine had few ambitions to purvey serious literature, although it did publish early work by respected writers like Dashiell Hammett, Jim Thompson, and Ann Rule, among others. It appealed to the same working class audience as its pulp fiction competitors and became a massive hit, evidently selling around 2 million copies per month in the 1930s and '40s. Its success inspired many imitators. MacFadden created a sister publication, Master Detective, and around 200 other true crime magazines emerged by the 1960s. Within the genre, True Detective was regarded as the standard bearer of quality and reliability.

The pulp magazine industry declined in the 1960s, out-competed by television and increasingly cheap paperback books. Many magazines went out of business. True Detective continued publication, though with increasingly sensational and sexualized content and declining quality. By the 1980s, it was one of only 11 true crime magazines still in print. The magazine went through several publishers; in 1995, it was bought out by Globe Communications, which shuttered the magazine. After the American magazine shut down, British publishers continued True Detective under a new format, with an increased focus on Australian, European, and historical crimes.

== Radio ==
Various radio series based on the magazine have run over several decades. The CBS radio network briefly ran the first radio version from May 16, 1929 to May 8, 1930. This was followed by a long association at various times and forms on the Mutual radio network, from September 8, 1936 until June 2, 1958. During a gap in the late 1930s the series was instead syndicated in a transcribed form.

== Bibliography ==
- Murley, Jean (2005). The Rise of True Crime: 20th-Century Murder and American Popular Culture. ABC-CLIO. ISBN 1573567728.
