= Gar Thorsrud =

American smokejumper (1928–2014)

- Born: February 20, 1928; Montana, United States
- Died: November 23, 2014 (aged 84)
- Education: University of Montana
- Occupation: Smokejumper
- Employer: Sierra Pacific Airlines
- Organization: Central Intelligence Agency

Garfield Thorsrud (February 20, 1928 – November 23, 2014) was a Montana pilot and smoke jumper who was initially contracted by the Central Intelligence Agency to fly aircraft for the Tibetan insertion operation, encrypted STBARNUM, in the early 1950s.

== Biography ==
Thorsrud was one of the first eight smokejumpers recruited out of the University of Montana by the Central Intelligence Agency in Spring 1951.He was subsequently offered a staff position in Special Operating Group and, together with Major (later Brigadier General) Heinie Aderholt—who had been seconded to the Agency from the US Air Force—stood up a separate paramilitary air wing—later formalized as Air Branch. SOG/Air Branch (and Thorsrud) subsequently played a major role in virtually every Agency covert action in the Third World during the cold war and beyond. In 1956, Thorsrud established an air operations base carved out of the jungle in a western pacific location and from there he oversaw air delivery of men and supplies to support President Eisenhower's program to de-stabilize the Sukarno regime in Indonesia. Gar was assigned President and CEO of Intermountain Aviation, a covert aviation maintenance company, based out of Marana Air Park (now Pinal Air Park), near Tucson, AZ about 1960.

He recruited a number of former Smokejumpers and other witting "agency" employees, and a larger number of unwitting employees who were not told of their CIA connection. In order to maintain their aviation cover business, Intermountain regularly repaired and maintained the aviation interests of other businesses and persons. Gar contracted with Hugh Hefner in the 1960s to repair and paint the famous jet-black Playboy Bunny DC-9 airplane. Later he negotiated a deal with the Big-3 auto makers to ship car parts between auto factories across the eastern U.S. in agency C-46 aircraft, allthewhile funneling millions from the auto makers into the covert company's bank accounts.

When the Soviets abandoned an arctic weather and listening station in the mid-1960s, after the ice pack it was built on broke adrift, Thorsrud organized the air assets from Intermountain Aviation for Operation Cold Feet, a remarkable joint CIA-US Navy operation that put 2 officers on the floating ice flow to recover a treasure trove of documents, instruments and equipment abandoned there by the Soviets. Thorsrud then successfully extracted the two officers by means of a "cow catcher" attached to a converted B-17 bomber that snagged a line attached to an inflated balloon and connected to the men by harness. This incredible feat in the arctic slowly leaked out and became the basis for the spy thriller film "Ice Station Zebra." During the early years of China operations, Air Branch assumed control of several private Asian cargo airlines and turned them into CIA proprietary companies. These included Civil Air Transport (CAT), purchased from its founder General Claire Chennault, as well as Air America, and lesser known air proprietaries such as BirdAir, and Southern Air Transport. Thorsrud was in charge of running CIA air operations during the April 1961 invasion of Cochinos Bay, Cuba.

Thorsrud later founded Mountain West Aviation in 1975 which in turn became Sierra Pacific Airlines.

== Personal life ==
He had three children with his wife Audrey, who continues to live in the Tucson area. Tributes to Gar and Intermountain Aviation hang on the walls of CIA headquarters in Langley, VA.
