= Sex to Sexty =

American humor magazine

Sex to Sexty was a sexually oriented humor magazine published in Arlington, Texas, by John W. Newbern, Jr. and Peggy Rodebaugh, with art direction (and cartoons, covers, etc.) by Lowell Davis (later to become known as a creator of bucolic art)), under the respective pseudonyms of Richard or Dick Rodman, Goose Reardon, and Pierre Davis.

The content was a mixture of risqué anecdotes; limericks (some by Gershon Legman) and other short humorous sexual poetry; and cartoons, the latter initially by Davis but soon expanding to include artists such as veteran good girl artists Bill Ward and Bill Wenzel. It ran from 1964 to 1983.

The magazine's publisher, SRI Publishing Co., also published novelty records and gag books under the Sex to Sexty title.

== Critical reception ==
The first serious discussion of the magazine was published by Taschen in 2008, titled, Sex to Sexty: The Most Vulgar Magazine Ever Made! ISBN 9783822852231 edited by Dian Hanson, with a preface by artist Mike Kelley.
