= Nee Tata Naa Birla =

- Poster
- Directed by: Nagendra Magadi
- Based on: Boeing Boeing by Priyadarshan
- Produced by: D. Ravikumar
- Starring: V. Ravichandran; Jaggesh; Pooja Gandhi; Jennifer Kotwal; Urvashi; Nikita Thukral; Keerthi Chawla
- Cinematography: Ramesh Babu
- Edited by: Lakshman Reddy
- Music by: Gurukiran
- Production company: Mother India Movie Tone
- Release date: 27 June 2008
- Running time: 152 minutes
- Country: India
- Language: Kannada

Nee Tata Naa Birla (transl. You are Tata, I am Birla) is a 2008 Indian Kannada-language comedy film directed and scripted by Nagendra Magadi. The film has an ensemble cast including V. Ravichandran, Jaggesh, Pooja Gandhi, Jennifer Kotwal, Nikita Thukral and Keerthi Chawla in the leading roles. It is based on the 1985 Malayalam movie Boeing Boeing.

The film revolves around two con men (Ravichandran and Jaggesh) who are experts at stealing from the rich and giving it to the poor. In this process, they are approached by a well known don who gives them a deal of wooing two young girls, who work for the bank. The assignment is to get the code numbers from both the girls and loot the money from the bank. The film takes on the comical track about how the men succeed in their assignment and how they face their real families.

== Cast ==
- V. Ravichandran as Ravi
- Jaggesh as Jaggu
- Jennifer Kotwal as Teju
- Pooja Gandhi as Pooja
- Keerthi Chawla
- Nikita Thukral
- Urvashi as Draupadi (Cook)
- Doddanna
- Rajan P. Dev
- Sadhu Kokila
- Satyajith
- Karibasavaiah
- Jyothi Rana
- Rekha Das
- Sundar Raj
- Kuri Prathap
- Harish Rai

== Soundtrack ==
The music was composed by Gurukiran and lyrics written by V. Manohar and Hrudaya Shiva. A total of 5 tracks have been composed for the film and the audio rights brought by Skanda Audio.

Track listing
No.	Title	Lyrics	Singer(s)	Length
1.	"Yardo Duddu"	V. Manohar	Karthik, Chaitra H. G.	04:35
2.	"Mutthu Kodala"	Hrudaya Shiva	Rajesh Krishnan, K. S. Chithra	04:34
3.	"Sakha Sakhi"	V. Manohar	Gurukiran, Chaitra H. G.	04:18
4.	"Yavva Yavva"	V. Manohar	Usha Uthup, Malgudi Subha, Gurukiran	04:03
5.	"Nee Tata Naa Birla"	V. Manohar	Hemanth Kumar, Gurukiran, Shamitha Malnad	04:31

== Reception ==
=== Critical response ===
R. G. Vijayasarathy of Rediff.com scored the film at 1.5 out of 5 stars and wrote "Ravichandran's comedy timing is always perfect, and he shines in here too though the same cannot be said of a repetitious Jaggesh. Jennifer and Pooja Gandhi are seen mostly in song and dance sequences. The other girls just come and go. Only a fan of Ravichandran and Jaggesh will call this even a time pass film". Sify wrote "The theme is absolutely worn out and comedy scenes are shabby. Director Nagendra Magadi Pandu also known for comedy flicks has consumed a lot of time to tell the same old story. The novelty is missing in this film. Every scene in the film is predictable".
