= Boeing Boeing (1985 film) =

- Theatrical release poster
- Directed by: Priyadarshan
- Written by: Priyadarshan; Sreenivasan (dialogue)
- Based on: Boeing Boeing
- Produced by: Thiruppathi Chettiyar
- Starring: Mohanlal; Mukesh; M. G. Soman; Jagathy Sreekumar; Lizy; Sukumari; Menaka; Maniyanpilla Raju; Sankaradi
- Cinematography: S. Kumar
- Edited by: K. Sankunni
- Music by: Reghu Kumar; K. J. Joy (score)
- Production company: Evershine Productions
- Distributed by: Evershine Release
- Release date: 1 September 1985
- Running time: 150 minutes
- Country: India
- Language: Malayalam

Boeing Boeing is a 1985 Indian Malayalam-language romantic comedy film written and directed by Priyadarshan. This is based on the 1960 French play of the same name by Marc Camoletti. The plot follows Shyam (Mohanlal) who is dating three flight attendants at the same time, and the scenario gets complicated with the arrival of his friend Anilkumar (Mukesh) along with other obstructions.

The film is regarded as one of the best comedy films in Malayalam cinema. The film was a blockbuster and remains one of the cult classic comic capers in Malayalam cinema. It was remade in Telugu as Chilakkottudu (1997) and in Kannada as Nee Tata Naa Birla. Priyadarshan remade it in Hindi in 2005 as Garam Masala. The Mohanlal and Mukesh duo became popular after this film.

== Synopsis ==
Shyam is a silver-tongued but essentially likeable weasel. He's a flirt, engaged to Sreekutty. He doesn't have much luck with women or his career, but when a bunch of opportunists seem to pop into his life with all kinds of dreamy offers, he bites. Suddenly, he finds himself stirring an ambitious fiancée soup, dating three air hostesses introduced to him by Lambodharan, and driving cars he doesn't own with the help of his friend, driver Kuttappan. He rises to the occasion admirably. Even as he meticulously takes down flight schedules and itinerary details, he finds himself flummoxed on many a turn, where he lies magnificently through his teeth. Soon, he's 'in the zone', a complete player, addicted to the thrills of infidelity and everyone is a co-conspirator. Anil is a smarmy stud with an exuberant lack of scruples. While managing to wangle his way to a promotion, a Mumbai trip, he looks up to Shyam. Despite the obvious rivalry, Anil decides to move in as an acolyte. Shyam is a pro, and wants Anil out of his life, but has to begrudgingly admit that he's a huge help with the ladies. Anil acts unflappable with others around but grovels in front of Shyam to let him stay. Beneath the egos and competition, however, it's pretty visible that these two like each other. Another one stirring the broth is Mrs. Dick aka Dickammayi, a moody chef whose husband eloped and married her sister. She has been warned about women in the house but is unaware that her domestic duties would involve shuffling pictures in and out of photo frames and making three different kinds of dinner on the same night. Justifiably, she often flies off the handle and vainly demands a never-forthcoming raise.

Eventually, Shyam and Anil are devastated by the air hostess-surfing game they play. They barely manage to disengage from a lethal imbroglio and look set to quit while they're still ahead. Both men are exhausted, downbeat, and seemingly resigned to their fate. Elena, one of the three air hostesses starts feeling a soft corner for Anil, and they decide to lead a life together. Shyam and Anil size each other up and sigh wearily, and just when they're going to throw in the towel, they solemnly make their decision. 'One for you, two for me,' Shyam mutters. Anil, equally cool, nods and seals the deal. But the commotion doesn't end there. The other two air hostesses find out that they have been cheated. In the end, both Shyam and Anil realize their mistakes, and Shyam decides to marry his "murapennu", Sreekutty.

== Cast ==
- Mohanlal as Shyam
- Mukesh as Anilkumar
- Lissy as Eleena (1st Cabin-Crew)
- Madhuri as Padma (2nd air-hostess)
- Ashwini as Indhu (3rd air-hostess)
- Menaka as Sreekutty
- Jagathy Sreekumar as O. P. Olassa
- Sukumari as Dick Ammayi
- Maniyanpilla Raju as Kuttappan
- M. G. Soman as Lambodharan Pillai
- Sankaradi as M. T. E. Damodaran
- K. P. A. C. Sunny as Sreekandan Nair
- Oduvil Unnikrishnan as Ramankutty Shop Owner
- Bobby Kottarakkara as (Tea Shop Owner)
- Kaduvakulam Antony as Fake father
- Manavalan Joseph as Father of Sreekutty
- Priya as item number "Boeing Boeing"
- Vallathol Unnikrishnan as Priest
- Shankar as Man at the Restaurant (cameo)
- K J Thomas (Babu) as Ettuveetil Raghavan Pillai

Kottayam Santha gave voice (dubbed) for all the female lead characters in the film.

== Soundtrack ==
The music was composed by Raghu Kumar and the lyrics were written by Mankombu Gopalakrishnan. The film was scored by K. J. Joy.

Song	Singers	Lyrics
Oru Punnaaram	K. J. Yesudas, KS Chithra, Unni Menon	Mankombu Gopalakrishnan
Thozhukai	K. J. Yesudas	Mankombu Gopalakrishnan

== See also ==
- Boeing Boeing (1965 film)
- Chilakkottudu
- Garam Masala (2005 film)
- Nee Tata Naa Birla
