= Boeing-Boeing (play) =

1960 play by Marc Camoletti

- Original language: French
- Written by: Marc Camoletti
- Subject: "It all boils down to juggling timetables and a reliable maid who never forgets to change the photographs."
- Genre: Comedy; farce
- Setting: Bernard's apartment, Paris, France

Premiere
- Date: 10 December 1960
- Place: Comédie-Caumartin, Paris

Boeing-Boeing is a farce written by the French playwright Marc Camoletti. The English-language adaptation, translated by Beverley Cross, was first staged in London at the Apollo Theatre in 1962 and transferred to the Duchess Theatre in 1965, running for seven years. In 1991, the play was listed in the Guinness Book of Records as the most performed French play throughout the world.

== Synopsis ==
The play is set in the 1960s, and centres on bachelor Bernard, who has a flat in Paris, and three airline stewardesses all engaged to him without knowing about each other. Bernard's life gets bumpy when his friend Robert comes to stay, and complications such as weather and a new, speedier Boeing jet disrupt his careful planning. Soon, all three stewardesses are in the city simultaneously and catastrophe looms.

== Characters ==
- Bernard: a Parisian architect and lothario (turned into an American who resides in Paris in the most recent Broadway production)
- Berthe: Bernard's French housekeeper
- Robert: Bernard's old school chum (from Wisconsin)
- Jaqueline (or Gabriella): the French fiancée (or the Italian fiancée) and air hostess
- Janet (or Gloria): the American fiancée and air hostess
- Judith (or Gretchen): the German fiancée and air hostess

== Productions ==
The English version of the play was first staged in London's West End at the Apollo Theatre in 1962 with David Tomlinson in the lead role and then transferred to the Duchess Theatre in 1965, running for seven years. After a year in the play, Tomlinson was replaced by Leslie Phillips, who played in it for two years. He was then replaced by Nicholas Parsons, who played in it for 15 months.

The play was produced on Broadway at the Cort Theatre from February 2, 1965, closing on February 20, 1965, after 23 performances. Directed by Jack Minster, the cast included Ian Carmichael, Susan Carr, Diana Millay, and Gerald Harper.

The play was also on in Blackpool at the South Pier during 1967, and featured Vicki Woolf, Dandy Nichols, Hugh Lloyd, Ann Sidney, and Christina Taylor.

In 1978, the play was produced in Kansas City, featuring Jerry Mathers and Tony Dow of Leave It to Beaver.

The play was adapted by W!LD RICE production in Singapore in 2002. It was directed by Glen Goei; Glen and the company revisited, modernized, and relocated this comedy to Asia and the present day, whilst keeping faithful to the text and the spirit of the play. The three air hostesses's nationalities were changed to Singapore, Hong Kong, and Japan. The show starred Lim Yu-Beng, Pam Oei, Emma Yong, Chermaine Ang, Sean Yeo, and Mae Paner-Rosa.

Boeing-Boeing was revived in London in February 2007 at the Comedy Theatre in a production directed by Matthew Warchus. Once again, the play proved to be a hit with critics and audiences alike. The original cast of the production featured Roger Allam as Bernard, Frances de la Tour as Bertha, Mark Rylance as Robert, and Tamzin Outhwaite, Daisy Beaumont, and Michelle Gomez as Bernard's three fiancées, Gloria, Gabriella, and Gretchen. This production received two Olivier Award nominations, for Best Revival and Best Actor (Mark Rylance), but won neither. Elena Roger later took on the role of Gabriella.

Warchus also directed the 2008 Broadway revival, which started previews on April 19, 2008, and opened on May 4 at the Longacre Theatre to good reviews. The cast featured Christine Baranski as Berthe, Mark Rylance, reprising his role as Robert, Bradley Whitford as Bernard, Gina Gershon as Gabriella, Mary McCormack as Gretchen, and Kathryn Hahn as Gloria. The curtain call of this revival was choreographed by Kathleen Marshall with original music by Claire van Kampen. The production closed on January 4, 2009, after 279 performances and 17 previews. A 45-week North American tour began in fall 2009. The production won the Best Revival of a Play and Rylance won the Tony Award for Best Leading Actor. The production was nominated for several other Tony Awards including: Best Featured Actress (Mary McCormack), Best Director (Matthew Warchus), Best Costume Design (Rob Howell) and Best Sound Design (Simon Baker). The production won the Drama Desk Award for Outstanding Revival of a Play, and Mark Rylance won for lead actor in a play.

=== 2007 West End revival ===
Dates	Bernard	Berthe	Robert	Gabriella	Gloria	Gretchen
Feb-May 2007	Roger Allam	Frances de la Tour	Mark Rylance	Daisy Beaumont	Tamzin Outhwaite	Michelle Gomez
May-Jun 2007	Roger Allam	Patricia Hodge	Mark Rylance	Daisy Beaumont	Amy Nuttall	Michelle Gomez
Jun-Oct 2007	Adrian Dunbar	Rhea Perlman	Neil Stuke	Elena Roger	Amy Nuttall	Doon Mackichan
Oct 2007-Jan 2008	Kevin McNally	Jean Marsh	Neil Stuke	Elena Roger	Jennifer Ellison	Tracy-Ann Oberman
UK Tour Dec 2008-Apr 2009	Martin Marquez	Susie Blake	John Marquez	Thaila Zucchi	Sarah Jayne Dunn	Josephine Butler

=== 2008 Broadway ===
Dates	Bernard	Berthe	Robert	Gabriella	Gloria	Gretchen
April 2008	Bradley Whitford	Christine Baranski	Mark Rylance	Gina Gershon	Kathryn Hahn	Mary McCormack
Sept 9, 2008	Greg Germann	Christine Baranski	Mark Rylance	Gina Gershon	Kathryn Hahn	Missi Pyle
Oct. 7, 2008	Greg Germann	Christine Baranski	Mark Rylance	Rebecca Gayheart	Paige Davis	Missi Pyle

== Adaptations ==
- Boeing Boeing (1965 film), American film adapted by Edward Anhalt with John Rich directing, stars Jerry Lewis, Tony Curtis and Thelma Ritter, released by Paramount Pictures
- Moutarada Gharamia, 1968 Egyptian film starring Fouad el-Mohandes, Shwikar and Abdel Moneim Madbouly.
- Boeing Boeing (1985 film), Malayalam film adaptation by Priyadarshan starring Mohanlal, Mukesh, and M. G. Soman
- Chilakkottudu, Telugu film adaption by E. V. V. Satyanarayana starring Jagapathi Babu and Rajendra Prasad
- Garam Masala (2005 film), Hindi film adaptation by Priyadarshan starring Akshay Kumar, John Abraham, and Paresh Rawal
- Nee Tata Naa Birla, Kannada film adaptation.

== Awards and nominations ==
=== 2008 Broadway revival ===
Year	Award	Category	Nominee	Result
2008	Tony Award	Best Revival of a Play		Won
2008	Tony Award	Best Actor in a Play	Mark Rylance	Won
2008	Tony Award	Best Featured Actress in a Play	Mary McCormack	Nominated
2008	Tony Award	Best Costume Design of a Play	Rob Howell	Nominated
2008	Tony Award	Best Sound Design of a Play	Simon Baker	Nominated
2008	Tony Award	Best Direction of a Play	Matthew Warchus	Nominated
2008	Drama Desk Award	Outstanding Revival of a Play		Won
2008	Drama Desk Award	Outstanding Actor in a Play	Mark Rylance	Won
2008	Drama Desk Award	Outstanding Direction of a Play	Matthew Warchus	Nominated
2008	Theatre World Award		Mark Rylance	Won
