= Chilakkottudu =

1997 film by E. V. V. Satyanarayana

- Movie Poster
- Directed by: E. V. V. Satyanarayana
- Written by: Satyanand (dialogues)
- Screenplay by: E. V. V. Satyanarayana
- Story by: Sai Krupa Productions Unit
- Produced by: M. Balaji Nagalingam
- Starring: Jagapathi Babu; Rajendra Prasad; Ramya Krishna; Madhu Bala; Gautami; Kasthuri; Indraja
- Cinematography: Adusumilli Vijay Kumar
- Edited by: Sai Nagababu
- Music by: Koti
- Production company: Sai Krupa Productions
- Release date: 4 January 1997
- Running time: 143 minutes
- Country: India
- Language: Telugu

Chilakkottudu (transl. Parrot's Bite) is a 1997 Indian Telugu-language comedy film, produced by M. Balaji Nagalingam under the Sai Krupa Productions banner and directed by E. V. V. Satyanarayana. The film stars Jagapati Babu, Rajendra Prasad, Madhubala, Gautami, Kasthuri, Indraja, with music composed by Koti. The film was a remake of the Malayalam film Boeing Boeing and was a box office success.

== Plot ==
The film begins with Jagapati, a tomcat who holds a photo studio jointly with his best friend, Prasad. Once, he rolls to a photo section for a cute girl, Indraja, daughter of a factionist Kadapa Kota, whom he entices. Afterward, Jagapati goes on to Bombay, where he attracts another beauty, Bombay Papa. Soon upon his arrival, he dashes three air hostesses, Madhu, Gautami, & Kasturi, at an airport and is covetous of them. Hence, Prasad makes his acquaintance with trafficker Brahmanandam. The two counterfeit Jagapati as a tycoon and entrap the three. Presently, they rent a villa of a drunkard AVS without his knowledge by handling the watchman Relangi Ramana Reddy. Now that Jagapati starts his game, the three air hostesses become frequenters of the house. Jagapati & Prasad hide & seek with them, keeping them in 3 different rooms, which ends hilariously.

Besides, Kadapa Kota focuses on his political career, for he conducts a vow to be calm & patient for three months. Knowing it, his opponent Ashok Kumar makes several attempts to destroy him but to no avail. Parallelly, destiny makes the three air hostesses buddies who schedule a get-together with their fiance. Being unbeknownst, Jagapati reaches therein. On the verge of being caught, Indraja abducts Jagapati, and they consummate. At one time, Brahmanandam speaks volumes regarding air hostesses in the aircraft code language. Overhearing it, CBI officers Mallikarjuna Rao & Leg misconstrue them as terrorists who are behind and join as servants in the house.

Meanwhile, AVS realizes the hoodwinking of each of them, but fortuitously, he loses his memory, and they turn him into a watchman. Further, the Kota threshold is successfully about to be completed in a few minutes. At that moment, he is conscious that Indraja is pregnant, outbursts, and spoils the mission. Thus, he proceeds to seek vengeance against Jagapati. At the same time, Gauthami lands and kisses Prasad in confusion when he falls for her. Jagapati, being aware, first confronts Prasad, but then he says to quit her for him. The four beauties get here, and the truth breaks out when they all flare up. At last, Jagapati tries to abscond, getting a lift from Bombay Papa, who apprehends him by Police. Finally, the movie ends with CBI Officers seizing Prasad & Brahmanandam.

== Cast ==
- Jagapathi Babu as Jagapathi Babu
- Rajendra Prasad as Rajendra Prasad
- Ramya Krishna as Bombay Papa (Cameo appearance)
- Madhu Bala as Madhu
- Gautami as Gautami
- Kasthuri as Kasturi
- Indraja as Indraja
- Kota Srinivasa Rao as Cuddapah Kotaiah
- Brahmanandam as Broker Brahmanandam
- M. S. Narayana as Auto Driver
- Venu Madhav as Taxi Driver
- Chalapathi Rao as Inspector Chalapati
- A.V.S. as House Owner
- Mallikarjuna Rao as Mallikarjuna Rao
- Gundu Hanumantha Rao as Tea Seller Hanumantu
- Ironleg Sastri as Leg
- Junior Relangi as Watchman Relangi Ramana Reddy
- Jenny as pastor
- Y. Vijaya as Julie
- K. Ashok Kumar as Minister
- Jeeva as Jeeva
- Narsing Yadav as Kota's Henchman
- Kallu Krishna Rao as Sage
- E. V. V. Satyanarayana as himself (Cameo)

== Soundtrack ==
Chilakkottudu

Film score by Koti
- Released: 1997
- Genre: Soundtrack
- Length: 37:13
- Label: TA Sound Track
- Producer: Koti

Koti chronology
Chelikadu (1997)	Chilakkottudu (1997)	Collector Garu (1997)

The music for the film was composed by Koti, and released by the TA Sound Track Audio Company.

No.	Title	Lyrics	Singer(s)	Length
1.	"Andave Andamaa"	Bhuvana Chandra	S. P. Balasubrahmanyam, Chitra	3:59
2.	"Balegundi Chuudu"	Sirivennela Sitarama Sastry	S. P. Balasubrahmanyam, Chitra	4:40
3.	"Bamchik Bamchik"	Samavedam Shanmukha Sarma	S. P. Balasubrahmanyam, Chitra	4:33
4.	"Chamanti Pubanti"	Samavedam Shanmukha Sarma	S. P. Balasubrahmanyam, Chitra	4:54
5.	"Muddukori Vacchindamma"	Samavedam Shanmukha Sarma	S. P. Balasubrahmanyam, Chitra	5:22
6.	"Nacchade Roudi Pilladu"	Bhuvana Chandra	S. P. Balasubrahmanyam, Chitra	4:05
7.	"Pacchi Pacchi Prayam"	Veturi	S. P. Balasubrahmanyam, Chitra	5:34
8.	"Adaraho Andama"	Sirivennela Sitarama Sastry	S. P. Balasubrahmanyam, Chitra	4:06
Total length:				37:13
