= American Cinematographer Manual =

Filmmaking manual

- 10th Edition
- Language: English
- Subject: Filmmaking, Cinematography
- Publisher: American Cinematographer
- Publication place: United States
- ISBN: 978-1467568319

The American Cinematographer Manual is a filmmaking manual published by the American Society of Cinematographers. Covering lighting, lenses, and film emulsions, it is considered “an authoritative technical reference manual for cinematographers.” The manual also defines the cinematography profession.

== Publishing history ==
The first version was published in 1935 by Jackson J. Rose as The American Cinematographer Hand Book and Reference Guide. That handbook went through nine editions (1935, '38, '39, '42, '46, '47, '50, '53, '56) before it evolved into the American Cinematographer Manual. The first edition of the Manual was published in 1960. The book is now in its tenth edition (2015). The eleventh edition was announced on January 14, 2022 to be available in late March 2022.

- 1960 October, First Edition (blue cover), ed. Joseph V. Mascelli, 484 pages.
- 1966 September, Second Edition (maroon cover), ed. Joseph V. Mascelli, 628 pages.
- 1969, Third Edition (brown cover), ed. Arthur C. Miller and Walter Strenge, 652 pages.
- 1973, Fourth Edition (black cover), ed. Charles G. Clarke and Walter Strenge, 658 pages.
- 1980, Fifth Edition (black cover), ed. Charles G. Clarke, 628 pages.
- 1986, Sixth Edition (red cover), ed. Fred H. Detmers, 440 pages.
- 1993, Seventh Edition (green cover, paperback), ed. Dr. Rod Ryan, 618 pages.
- 2001, Eighth Edition (blue cover), ed. Rob Hummel, 972 pages.
- 2004, Ninth Edition (black cover), ed. Stephen H. Burum, ASC, 919 pages.
- 2013, Tenth Edition, revised 2015 (maroon cover, paperback), ed. Michael Goi, ASC. 2 volumes: vol. 1, 504 pages; vol. 2, 582 pages.
- 2023, Eleventh Edition (green cover, hardbound), ed. M. David Mullen, ASC, Rob Hummel, ASC associate member, 685 pages.

== Awards ==
In 2002, the Academy of Motion Picture Arts & Sciences presented an Award of Commendation to the American Society of Cinematographers for its ongoing publication of the American Cinematographer Manual. Richard Edlund, chair of the Scientific and Technical Awards Committee, said, "Over the years, the ASC has continued to provide commentary on up-to-date technologies from leading experts in the field of cinematography."
