= Eastern Sierra Regional Airport =

Airport in the United States

Eastern Sierra Regional Airport Bishop Army Airfield
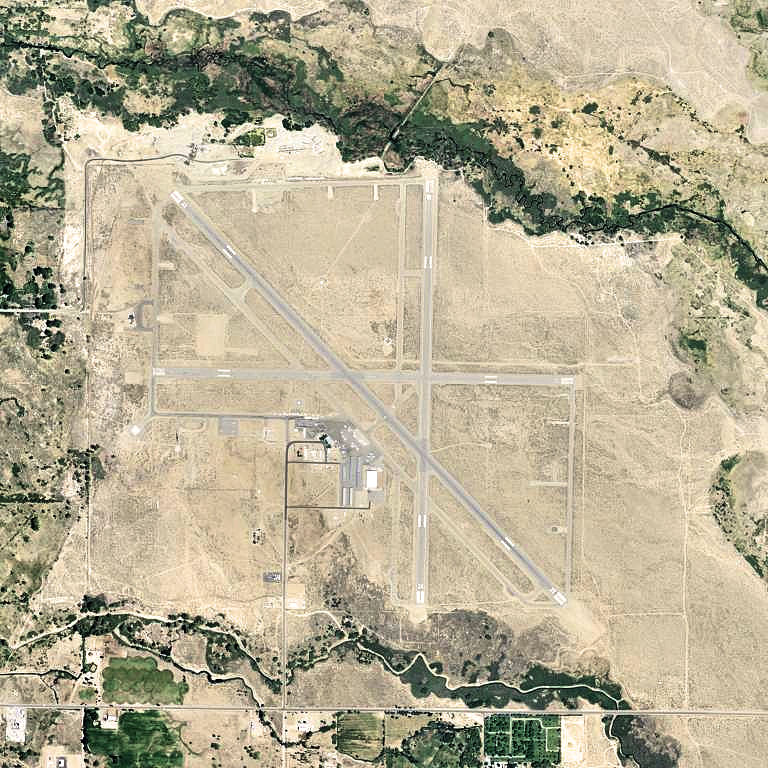
- USGS aerial photo, 2006
- IATA: BIH; ICAO: KBIH; FAA LID: BIH; WMO: 72480

Summary
- Airport type: Public
- Owner: City of Los Angeles; Department of Water and Power
- Operator: Inyo County
- Serves: Bishop, California
- Location: Inyo County, east of Bishop
- Elevation AMSL: 4,124 ft (1,257 m)
- Coordinates: 37°22′23″N 118°21′49″W
- Website: Official website

Map
- Location BIH (the United States)

Runways
Direction	Length		Surface
Direction	ft	m	Surface
8/26	5,567	1,697	Asphalt
12/30	7,498	2,285	Asphalt
17/35	5,600	1,707	Asphalt

Helipads
Number	Length		Surface
Number	ft	m	Surface
H1	40	12	Asphalt
H2	100	30	Asphalt

Statistics (2022)
- Aircraft operations (year ending 8/22/2022): 12,500
- Based aircraft: 39
- Source: Federal Aviation Administration

Eastern Sierra Regional Airport (IATA: BIH, ICAO: KBIH, FAA LID: BIH) is two miles east of Bishop, in Inyo County, California, United States. The land is leased from the Los Angeles Department of Water and Power. The airport is owned and operated by Inyo County.

== Facilities ==
The airport covers 830 acres (340 ha) at an elevation of 4,124 ft (1,257 m). It has three asphalt runways: 8/26 is 5,567 by 100 ft (1,697 by 30 m); 12/30 is 7,498 by 100 ft (2,285 by 30 m); 17/35 is 5,600 by 100 ft (1,707 by 30 m). It has two helipads: H1 is 40 by 40 ft (12 by 12 m) and H2 is 100 by 100 ft (30 by 30 m).

In the year ending August 22, 2022 the airport had 12,500 aircraft operations, average 34 per day: 84% general aviation, 8% commercial, 6% military, and 2% air taxi. 39 aircraft were then based at the airport: 35 single-engine, 2 multi-engine, 1 jet and 1 ultra-light.

== Airlines and destinations ==
=== Passenger ===
Effective December 19, 2021, SkyWest Airlines, operating as United Express, began nonstop service to the airport using Bombardier CRJ700 and Embraer ERJ 175 regional jets. Daily flights to San Francisco and Denver commenced in December 2022. The new service replaced United Express flights to nearby Mammoth Yosemite Airport and marked the return of scheduled passenger service to Eastern Sierra Regional Airport and the city of Bishop.

Airlines	Destinations
United Express	San Francisco; Seasonal: Denver

=== Top destinations ===
Busiest domestic routes out of BIH (May 2025 – April 2026)
Rank	City	Passengers	Carriers
1	Denver, CO	7,840	United
2	San Francisco, CA	7,770	United

=== Cargo ===
Airlines	Destinations
FedEx Feeder operated by West Air	Ontario
Ameriflight	Inyokern, Ontario, Tonopah

== Historical military use ==
The airfield opened in April 1940 on 897.22 acres (363.09 ha) subleased from Inyo County. During World War II it was known as Bishop Army Airfield and was a sub-base to Muroc Army Airfield in 1942 and 1943 for Fourth Air Force. The site was used for aircraft flight and ordnance delivery training. In 1943 it was reassigned to Tonopah Army Airfield, Nevada. Aircraft maintenance and ordnance storage were also done.

After the end of World War II, Bishop AAF was turned over to Air Technical Service Command as a storage airfield. On 2 May 1949, the Army cancelled its initial lease of 897.22 acres (363.09 ha) with Inyo County for Bishop Airport under the War Assets Administration's Peacetime Reduction Mission, and the base was declared excess to requirements and returned to civil control.

The U.S. Air Force subleased runway use rights and a heliport area of 4.76 acres (1.93 ha) known as the Bishop Test Site from Inyo County from 15 November 1965 to 19 June 1971 and from 25 November 1980 to 30 September 1985. The Air Force used the heliport area and runway for performance testing of helicopters and other aircraft. The U.S. DoD facilities included runway expansion, fuel facilities, utilities, buildings, aircraft maintenance, hospital and barracks.

Today, the airport is owned by the City of Los Angeles, California and is leased to Inyo County.

== Historical airline service ==
Trans Sierra Airlines, a commuter air carrier, was serving the airport in 1971 with two daily flights to Los Angeles (LAX) and two daily flights to San Jose (SJC) operated with Cessna 402 twin prop aircraft. Trans Sierra then changed its name to Sierra Pacific Airlines, which during the mid-1970s was operating direct service to Burbank (BUR) in the Los Angeles area and also to Las Vegas (LAS) via an intermediate stop at the nearby Mammoth Yosemite Airport as well as nonstop service to Fresno (FAT) with Handley Page Jetstream commuter propjets. In 1980 and 1981, Air Sierra was operating nonstop flights to Fresno with Piper Navajo twin prop aircraft. Also in 1981, Wings West Airlines was operating direct flights to Santa Monica (SMO) and Sacramento (SMF) via an intermediate stop at Mammoth Lakes Yosemite Airport as well as nonstop service to Oakland (OAK) with Cessna 402 twin prop aircraft. In 1983, Mojave Airlines was operating flights to Los Angeles (LAX), San Diego (SAN), Ontario (ONT), Inyokern (IYK) and Fox Field (WJF) in Lancaster with Beechcraft C99 commuter turboprops. By 1988, Alpha Air was providing commuter airline service with Beechcraft 1900C propjets direct to Los Angeles (LAX) and Oakland (OAK) as well as nonstop service to San Jose (SJC).

== Accidents and incidents ==
- On March 13, 1974 a David L. Wolper Productions crew filming a National Geographic history of Australopithecus at Mammoth Mountain Ski Area was killed when Sierra Pacific Airlines Flight 802, a Convair 440, crashed shortly after takeoff from the airport, killing all 36 on board including 31 Wolper crew members (but not Wolper himself). The filmed segment was recovered in the wreckage and was broadcast on the television show Primal Man. The U.S. National Transportation Safety Board never determined the cause of the accident, and the resort sold the airline.
- On August 11, 2002, Galen Rowell, his wife Barbara Cushman Rowell, pilot Tom Reid, and Reid's friend Carol McAffee were killed when an Aero Commander 690 crashed on a night approach into Eastern Sierra Regional Airport.

== See also ==
- California World War II Army Airfields
- National Landmark of Soaring
