= American Society of Cinematographers =

Cinematography organization

- Abbreviation: ASC
- Formation: January 8, 1919; 107 years ago
- Type: Professional Organization
- Purpose: Advancing the art and science of cinematography and bringing cinematographers together to exchange ideas, discuss techniques and promote the motion picture as an art form.
- Headquarters: Hollywood, California
- Members: 440
- Official language: English
- Key people: Shelly Johnson - President
- Main organ: Board
- Website: theasc.com

The American Society of Cinematographers (ASC), founded in Hollywood in 1919, is a cultural, educational, and professional organization that is neither a labor union nor a guild. The society was organized to advance the science and art of cinematography and gather a wide range of cinematographers to discuss techniques and ideas and to advocate for motion pictures as a type of art form. Currently, the president of the ASC is Mandy Walker.

Members use the post-nominal letters "ASC". On the 1920 film titled Sand!, cinematographer Joseph H. August, who was an original member of the ASC, became the first individual to have the "ASC" appear after his name on the onscreen credit.

Only cinematographers and special effect supervisors can become ASC members. Basic requirements include being a director of photography for a minimum five out of the last eight years, having a high professional reputation and being recommended by three active or retired ASC members.

== History ==
In the beginning of cinema, directors and photographers in the United States had a similar problem: they had "big, ugly white streaks" that resulted from static electricity discharged from the cameras. Two separate groups in the United States worked together to find a solution to this problem. The two groups were the Cinema Camera Club and the Static Club of America.

A precursor to the ASC, the Cinema Camera Club in New York City was founded in 1913 by Arthur Miller, Phil Rosen, and Frank Kugler. Arthur and his brother, William Miller, both filmmakers in New York City, worked together and established a union for cinematography workers called the Motion Picture Industry Union. Miller left to work in Hollywood, California, one year after the Motion Picture Industry Union was formed.

In 1918, Phil Rosen asked the president of the Cinema Camera Club of California, Charles Rosher, whether he could help reorganize the association by creating a national organization with "membership by invitation and a strong educational component". This reorganisation and the setup of the bylaws occurred on December 21, 1918. The ASC was officially authorized by the State of California on January 8, 1919.

In 2014, the ASC admitted its first member with no background in live action feature film, Pixar's Sharon Calahan, who had worked entirely in computer animation. The society started the ASC Master Class education program in the same year (2014). This program allows members of the ASC and other professionals to teach students from all walks of life on various subjects including composition, lighting, angles, creating mood among other techniques of visual storytelling.

In 2017, John Bailey, an ASC member, was elected as the president of the Academy of Motion Picture Arts and Sciences, making him the first cinematographer to take up such a position.

== Publications ==
In the 1920s, the ASC began printing a four-page newsletter titled The American Cinematographer in 1920. According to the ASC, "The American Cinematographer covers the technology and artistry of visual storytelling, offering print and digital editions." Within this publication, a wide range of cinematographer and technical information was produced through a variety of means such as interviews, articles, blogs and podcasts.

Other than the magazine, the ASC also publishes the American Cinematographer Manual. The first edition was published in 1935 by Jackson J. Rose as The American Cinematographer Hand Book and Reference Guide. The Hand Book evolved from the Cinematographic Annual only published twice, in 1930 and 1931. Rose's handbook went through nine editions by the middle of the 1950s, and it was from this book that the modern American Cinematographer Manual originated. The first edition of the new manual was published in 1960 and is now in its 11th edition, published in 2022.

== Founding members ==
- Phil Rosen
- Homer Scott
- William C. Foster
- L. D. Clawson
- Eugene Gaudio
- Tony Gaudio
- Walter L. Griffin
- Roy H. Klaffki
- Charles Rosher
- Victor Milner
- Joe August
- Arthur Edeson
- Fred LeRoy Granville
- J. D. Jennings
- Robert S. Newhard
- L. Guy Willy

== Award categories ==
=== Cinema ===
- Theatrical Feature Film
- Spotlight Award
- Non-Fiction Filmmaking^{[a]}

=== Television ===
- Episode of a One-Hour Regular Series
- Episode of a Half-Hour Series
- Limited or Anthology Series or Motion Picture Made for Television
- Episode of a One-Hour Commercial Television Series^{[a]}

=== Other media ===
- Documentary Award
- Music Video Award

=== Non-competitive awards ===
- Award of Distinction
- Board of the Governors Award
- Honorary Membership
- International Award
- Lifetime Achievement Award
- President's Award
- Television Career Achievement Award

==== Notes ====
- ^{^[a]} signifies a retired category

== See also ==
- List of presidents of American Society of Cinematographers
- British Society of Cinematographers
- Canadian Society of Cinematographers
