= Mammoth Yosemite Airport =

Regional airport in Mono County, California

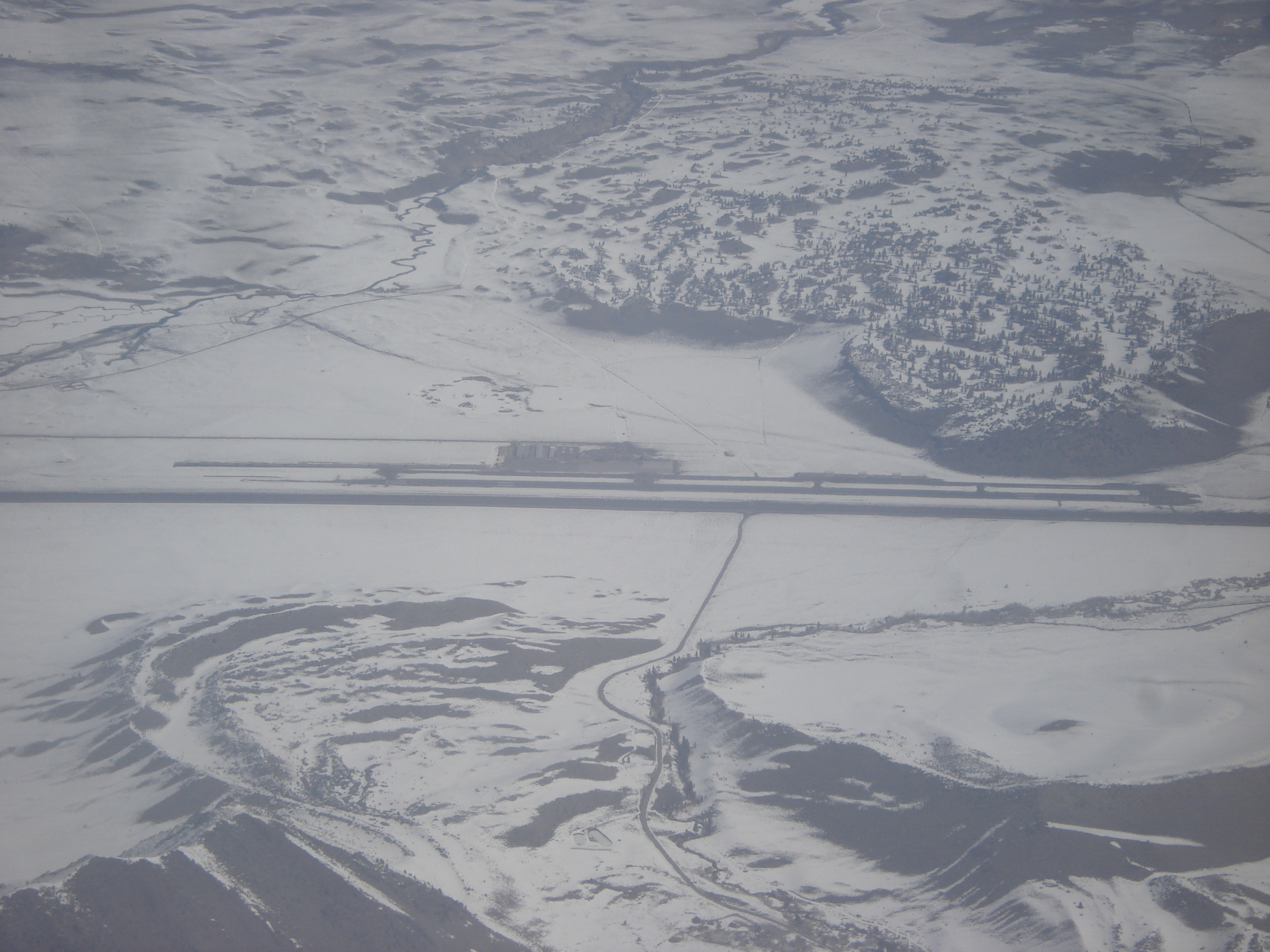
- Aerial view, March 2010
- IATA: MMH; ICAO: KMMH; FAA LID: MMH

Summary
- Airport type: Public
- Owner: Town of Mammoth Lakes
- Serves: Mammoth Lakes, California
- Elevation AMSL: 7,135 ft (2,175 m)
- Coordinates: 37°37′27″N 118°50′20″W
- Website: Official website

Map
- Location in California

Runways
| Direction | Length | | Surface |
| Direction | ft | m | Surface |
|---|---|---|---|
| 9/27 | 7,000 | 2,134 | Asphalt |

Statistics (2015)
- Aircraft operations: 6,280
- Based aircraft: 7
- Source: Federal Aviation Administration

Mammoth Yosemite Airport (IATA: MMH, ICAO: KMMH, FAA LID: MMH) is a town-owned public airport seven miles (11 km; 6.1 nmi) east of Mammoth Lakes, in Mono County, California, United States. Also known as Mammoth Lakes Airport or Mammoth–June Lake Airport, it is mainly used for general aviation, but has scheduled passenger flights operated by one airline which primarily serves the airport on a seasonal basis during the winter ski season. Additional scheduled passenger service for the Mammoth area is seasonally available at the nearby Eastern Sierra Regional Airport located in Bishop, CA.

The airport had 665 passenger boardings (enplanements) in calendar year 2008, 6,157 enplanements in 2009, and 19,814 in 2010. The National Plan of Integrated Airport Systems for 2011–2015 categorized it as a general aviation airport. However, the report for 2015–2019 upgraded this status to that of a primary/non-hub commercial airport.

== Facilities ==
The airport covers 230 acres (93 ha) at an elevation of 7,135 feet (2,175 m). Its one runway, 9/27, is 7,000 by 100 feet (2,134 by 30 m) asphalt.

In 2010 the airport had 8,285 aircraft operations, average 22 per day: 68% general aviation, 20% air taxi, 12% airline, and <1% military. Three aircraft were then based at this airport, all single-engine.

Mammoth Yosemite Airport has a terminal development master plan that will expand operations and will be able to accommodate bigger aircraft. The new terminal facilities will include a new terminal building itself, an airline parking apron, a deicing apron, access roads, automobile parking facilities, maintenance facilities, and airport offices.

== Historical airline service ==
United Airlines served the airport beginning in December 2010, via United Express. Initially service was only provided during winter months. In 2010 this became a year-round service. In December 2021, all of the United Express service moved to nearby Eastern Sierra Regional Airport in Bishop, California, as the airline made a decision that MMH could no longer support scheduled commercial flights because of poor operational reliability primarily due to weather issues.

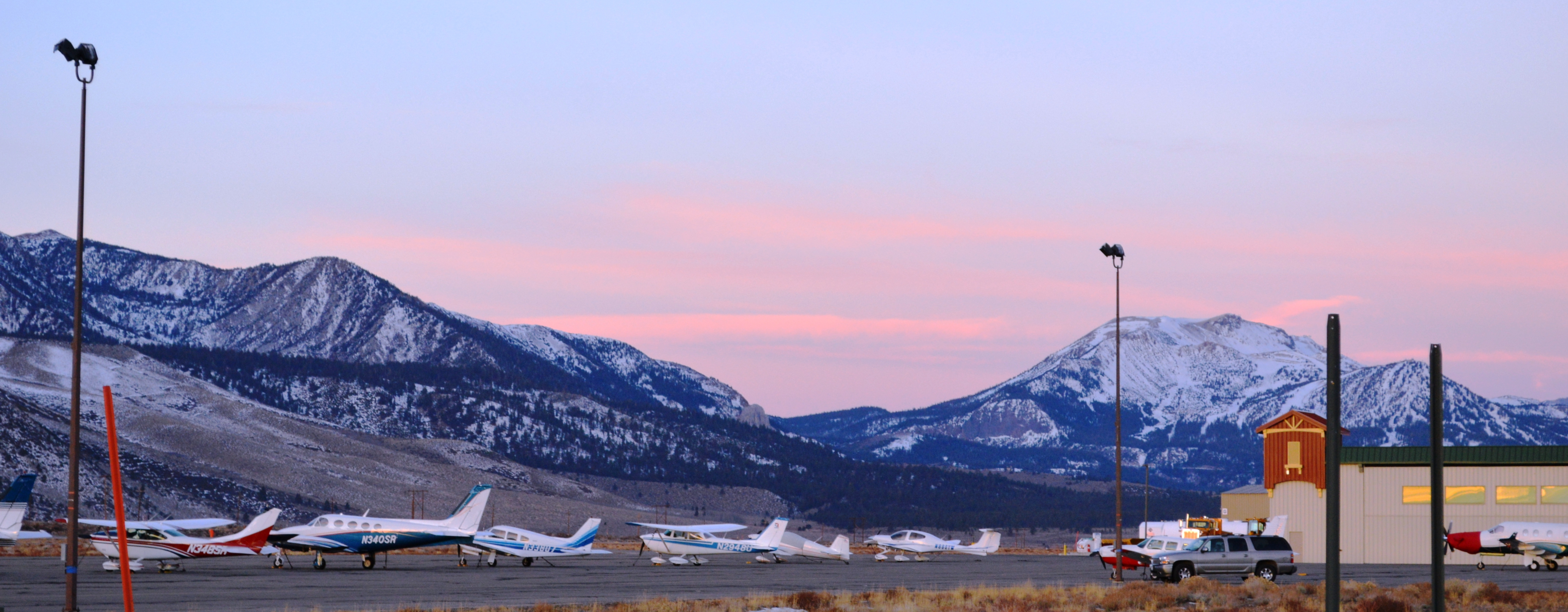
View from the airport, December 2013, with Mammoth Mountain in the background

== Airlines and destinations ==
| Airlines | Destinations | Refs |
|---|---|---|
| Advanced Air | Seasonal: Los Angeles/Hawthorne, San Diego/Carlsbad | |

Advanced Air operates Dornier 328JET regional jet aircraft provided by Taos Air on its new seasonal service. Previous passenger flights operated by Horizon Air on behalf of its corporate parent Alaska Airlines as well as seasonal United Express service operated by SkyWest Airlines on behalf of United Airlines in addition to service operated by JSX have all been either discontinued or realigned to the new air carrier.

== Statistics ==
Busiest domestic routes from MMH (May 2025 – April 2026)
| Rank | Airport | Passengers | Carriers |
|---|---|---|---|
| 1 | Carlsbad, California | 1,710 | Advanced Air |
| 2 | Hawthorne, California | 1,470 | Advanced Air |

=== Airline market share ===
Largest airlines at MMH (May 2025 – April 2026)
| Rank | Airline | Passengers | Percent of market share |
|---|---|---|---|
| 1 | Advanced Air | 6,410 | 100.00% |
