= Boeing Boeing (1965 film) =

1965 American film by John Rich

- Film poster by Jack Rickard
- Directed by: John Rich
- Screenplay by: Edward Anhalt
- Based on: Boeing-Boeing by Marc Camoletti
- Produced by: Hal B. Wallis
- Starring: Tony Curtis; Jerry Lewis; Thelma Ritter; Christiane Schmidtmer; Dany Saval; Suzanna Leigh
- Cinematography: Lucien Ballard
- Edited by: Warren Low; Archie Marshek
- Music by: Neal Hefti
- Distributed by: Paramount Pictures
- Release date: December 22, 1965
- Running time: 102 minutes
- Country: United States
- Languages: English; French; German
- Box office: $3 million (est. US/ Canada rentals); 1,128,519 admissions (France)

Boeing Boeing (Note: The on screen title of the film appears as Boeing (707) Boeing (707)) is a 1965 American bedroom farce comedy film based on the 1960 French play Boeing-Boeing. It stars Tony Curtis and Jerry Lewis. Released on December 22, 1965, it was the last film that Lewis made for Paramount Pictures, which had produced all of his films since My Friend Irma (1949).

== Plot ==
Bernard Lawrence is an American journalist stationed in Paris. A playboy, he has devised an ingenious system for juggling three girlfriends: he dates flight attendants who are assigned to international routes on non-intersecting flight schedules so that only one is in the country at any given time. He has their routes detailed with such precision that he can drop off his British United Airways girlfriend for her outgoing flight and pick up his inbound Lufthansa girlfriend on the same trip to the airport, while his Air France girlfriend is in a holding pattern elsewhere.

With help from his long-suffering housekeeper Bertha, who swaps the appropriate photos and food in and out of the apartment to match the incoming girlfriend, Lawrence keeps the women unaware of each other's presence in the apartment. They regard Lawrence's flat as their "home" during their Paris layovers.

Bernard is so happy with his life in Paris that he intends to turn down an imminent promotion that would require him to move to New York City. But his life is turned upside down when his girlfriends' airlines begin putting new, state-of-the-art jet aircraft into service. These faster airplanes change all of the existing route schedules and allow flight attendants to spend more time in Paris. Most alarming for Bernard, his three girlfriends will now all be in Paris at the same time.

Robert Reed, a fellow journalist and an old acquaintance, complicates Bernard's life even further when he arrives in town and is unable to find a hotel room. He insists on staying in Bernard's apartment for a few days. When he sees Bernard's living situation, he schemes to take over Bernard's apartment, girls, housekeeper and job while manipulating Bernard into taking the new job in New York.

== Cast ==
- Tony Curtis: Bernard Lawrence
- Jerry Lewis: Robert Reed
- Dany Saval: Jacqueline Grieux (Air France stewardess)
- Christiane Schmidtmer: Lise Bruner (Lufthansa stewardess)
- Suzanna Leigh: Vicky Hawkins (British United stewardess)
- Thelma Ritter: Bertha
- Lomax Study: Pierre

== Production ==
Director John Rich was under contract to Hal Wallis who assigned him to the film. The director saw the play in London and "realized at once that it was a giant European hit because its driving issue was satirically poking fun at American sexual proclivities in the jet age. I felt that a film based on this theme would do extremely well in foreign markets but probably wouldn't be received happily by U.S. audiences. Wallis disagreed with my comments."

According to Rich, Wallis insisted on casting Tony Curtis and Jerry Lewis in the leads. Rich liked Curtis but would have preferred Jack Lemmon or Dick Van Dyke instead of Lewis, who he felt would fall "back on familiary schtick rather than aiming for honesty."

Boeing Boeing was filmed from April 8 to June 30, 1965. Rich says initially Lewis misbehaved but the director threatened him and they forged a capable working relationship after that.

As Curtis and Lewis both wanted top billing, their names at the beginning of the film spin around in a circle with an airplane nacelle behind them. For the film's trailer, the animation was repeated and neither name was spoken aloud. On the film's posters, the names made an "X", with Lewis' name going up from the bottom left and Curtis' name going down from the upper left.

The film is one of the first times where audiences were able to hear Lewis speak with his normal voice throughout. It was a departure from the clownish style of visual comedy his fans had become accustomed to.

== Reception ==
Writing in The New York Times, critic Howard Thompson called the film a "strictly one-gag frolic" and "just middling, passable nonsense."

== Home media ==
The film was released on DVD and Blu-ray disc on February 14, 2012.

== Legacy ==
The film was selected by Quentin Tarantino for the first Quentin Tarantino Film Fest in Austin, Texas in 1996.

It was remade in Malayalam in 1985 with the same title. There are also numerous other adaptations of the same 1960 French play which inspired this film.

Garam Masala is a 2005 remake of Priyadarshan's 1985 Malayalam comedy.

== See also ==
- List of American films of 1965
- Come Fly with Me, 1963 film
- Coffee, Tea or Me?, 1967 novel
- The Stewardesses, 1969 film

== Sources ==
- Rich, John (2006). Warm Up the Snake: A Hollywood memoir. University of Michigan Press. ISBN 978-0-472-11578-5.
