= The Stewardesses =

1969 film by Alf Silliman Jr.

- Advertisement
- Directed by: Alf Silliman Jr.
- Written by: Alf Silliman Jr.
- Produced by: Christopher Bell
- Starring: Christina Hart; Monica Gayle; Paula Erickson; Donna Stanley; Michael Garrett
- Cinematography: Christopher Bell
- Music by: James Navas
- Distributed by: Sherpix
- Release date: July 25, 1969
- Running time: 75 minutes (1969 version); 83 minutes (1971 version); 93 minutes (Restored version)
- Country: United States
- Language: English
- Budget: $100,000
- Box office: $25 million

The Stewardesses is a 1969 American 3D softcore comedy film written and directed by Allan Silliphant (credited onscreen as Alf Silliman Jr.) and starring Christina Hart, Monica Gayle, Paula Erickson and Donna Stanley.

Produced on a budget of just over $100,000, the film grossed $26 million over its theatrical run. In budget-relative terms it remains the most profitable 3D film ever released. Originally self-rated "X", in 1971 the film was re-edited with newly shot scenes to receive an "R" rating from the Motion Picture Association of America to qualify for a wide general release.

== Plot ==
A single eventful night in the lives of a crew of Los Angeles-based, trans-Pacific stewardesses. The leading character is killed in a 30-story suicide leap, and the others simply "party," using drugs and engaging in various sexual encounters. One of the girls befriends and beds a returning Vietnam combat soldier.

== Production and development ==
The film was initially a 35mm 3D softcore "skin-flick" with minimal production values and a very basic plot. Since it was grossing extremely well in specialty "adult theaters," in 1971 Silliphant and executive producer Louis Sher decided to repackage their film into a regular R-rated, general release 3D feature film, with a more complex, conventional storyline with reduced nudity and simulated sex activity. New scenes were shot in both Los Angeles and Hawaii to "open up" the picture, including dialogue and characters on a newer passenger plane interior and cockpit.

The self-imposed X rating was a draw in the early stages, attracting viewers to relatively small theaters showing the 3D film. In the last year, with the official R rating, it was possible to show the film more widely, even in 70mm 3D, in houses like the 4,300-seat Boston Music Hall. The film ran for three years and was presented in just over 800 theaters. It outsold some higher budget movies in larger theaters. The film also played in at least 30 overseas markets.

The film is also notable in that it may be the only film to be extensively re-shot, edited and updated as it played in theaters, according to Silliphant. Probably four versions of the evolving film were played over the three years that the film was in active distribution.

Writer, producer, director, and 3D technologist Allan Silliphant was the younger half-brother of Academy Award-winning writer and producer Stirling Silliphant. Co-producer and cinematographer Chris Condon, who had founded Century Precision Optics, built innovative, relatively lightweight and portable single-strip 3D cameras. Theater owner Louis Sher was the executive producer, and used his Art Theater Guild theaters to display the film coast to coast. Specially trained 3D technicians would be sent to each and every theater to install the special equipment, and to teach the projectionists how to keep it running.

== 3D stereo technology ==
The film was shot in 35 mm color and projected in a new, single-strip, side-by-side polarized format called StereoVision. The image was compressed horizontally in printing, then expanded with an integrated anamorphic "unsqueezing" lens for projection. Unlike some prior technologies it was impossible for the two film images to go out of sync, because they were side by side on the same strip of film. All showings used sturdier plastic-framed polarized glasses, rather than the familiar paper ones of the 1950s. Silliphant was the original president of StereoVision International Inc., and was the co-inventor of the basic process.

In 1972, the film was blown up to side-by-side 70 mm 3D, which removed the requirement for anamorphics due to the wider frame.

== Marketing history ==
The film was uniquely marketed in that it never used a promotional trailer but with many billboards, radio spots, and always an impressive "road show" treatment on the marquee of the theater. In several cases, the film ran for over a year in the same theater. The ad campaign would state "47th great week," or whatever was the local "hold-over" figure. It was the number-one film in the United States for three weeks in September and October 1971.

By 1975 it had earned theatrical rentals of $6,878,450 in the 25 metropolitan areas in the United States and Canada surveyed by Variety. In 2024-adjusted dollars, the domestic film rentals exceeded $117 million. Having grossed around 260 times its budget, it is, in relative terms, one of the all-time film financial successes.

It has been argued the film's success led to the "nurse" cycle at New World Pictures starting with The Student Nurses (1970).

== Home video ==
In the early days of video, Caballero Control Corporation released a re-edited version of The Stewardesses on VHS and Betamax tape formats, which are now out of print. In creating this XXX version, Caballero edited hardcore insert shots into the film and re-released it, with the tagline "From 3D to 3XXX" on the tape cover. Although being a non-official XXX version of the film, the original theatrical release credits for The Stewardesses remained intact for this release.

In 2009, the 3D and 2D versions of The Stewardesses became available on DVD. Marking 40 years since its theatrical release, the 2-DVD set also includes 2 pairs of 3D glasses and bonus features.

In 2016, the film was released by Kino Lorber on Blu-ray.

== See also ==
- Come Fly with Me, 1963 film
- Boeing Boeing, 1965 film version of the 1962 play
- Coffee, Tea or Me?, 1967 novel
- Fly Me, 1973 film
- The Naughty Stewardesses, 1975 film, released in January
- Blazing Stewardesses, 1975 film, released in June
- List of 3D films
