= Donald Bain (writer) =

American author and ghostwriter

- Born: Donald Sutherland Bain; March 6, 1935
- Died: October 21, 2017 (aged 82)
- Occupations: Author; ghostwriter

Donald Sutherland Bain (March 6, 1935 – October 21, 2017) was an American author and ghostwriter, having written over 115 books in his 40-year career.

== Early life and education ==
Bain was a native of Mineola, New York and graduated from Purdue University in 1957 where he studied speech and drama. While there, he earned his pilot's license through the Air Force ROTC.

== Bibliography ==
=== The Coffee, Tea or Me? series ===
byline: Trudy Baker and Rachel Jones

- Coffee, Tea or Me? (1967)
- The Coffee Tea or Me Girls’ Round-the-World Diary (1970)
- The Coffee Tea or Me Girls Lay It on the Line (1972)
- The Coffee Tea or Me Girls Get Away From it All (1974)

=== The Murder, She Wrote series ===
byline: Jessica Fletcher and Donald Bain

A spin-off book series based on the Murder, She Wrote American crime drama television series starring Angela Lansbury as mystery writer and amateur detective Jessica Fletcher.

- Gin and Daggers (1st edition) (1989)
- Manhattans and Murder (1994)
- Rum and Razors (1995)
- Brandy and Bullets (1995)
- Martinis and Mayhem (1995)
- A Deadly Judgment (1996)
- A Palette for Murder (1996)
- The Highland Fling Murders (1997)
- Murder on the QE2 (1997)
- Murder in Moscow (1998)
- A Little Yuletide Murder (1998)
- Murder at the Powderhorn Ranch (1999)
- Knock 'em Dead (1999)
- Gin and Daggers (2nd edition) (2000)
- Trick or Treachery (2000)
- Blood on the Vine (2001)
- Murder in a Minor Key (2001)
- Provence - to Die for (2002)
- You Bet Your Life (2002)
- Majoring in Murder (2003)
- Destination Murder (2003)
- Dying to Retire (2004)
- A Vote for Murder (2004)
- The Maine Mutiny (2005)
- Margaritas and Murder (2005)
- A Question of Murder (2006)
- Three Strikes and You're Dead (2006)
- Coffee, Tea, or Murder? (2007)
- Panning For Murder (2007)
- Murder on Parade (2008)
- A Slaying in Savannah (2008)
- Madison Avenue Shoot (2009)
- A Fatal Feast (2009)
- Nashville Noir (2010)
- The Queen's Jewels (2010)
- Skating on Thin Ice (2011)
- The Fine Art of Murder (2011)
- Trouble at High Tide (2012)
- Domestic Malice (2012)
- Prescription For Murder (2013)
- Close-Up On Murder (2013)
- Aloha Betrayed (2014)
- Death of a Blue Blood (2014)
- Killer in the Kitchen (2015)
- The Ghost and Mrs. Fletcher (2015)
- Design for Murder (2016)
- Hook, Line, and Murder (2016)
- A Date with Murder (2018) written with Jon Land

=== Comedic novels ===
- Tender Loving Care – byline: Joni Moura & Jackie Sutherland (1969)
- Girlpower – byline: Kathy Cole & Donna Bain (1971)
- How to Make a Good Airline Stewardess – byline: Cornelius Wohl & Bill Wenzel (1972)
- If It Moves, Kiss It – byline: Joni Moura & Jackie Sutherland (1973)
- We Gave at the Office – byline: Laura Mills & Pauline Burlick (1977)
- Fly Me - byline: Cornelius Wohl & Bill Wenzel (1974)
- Teachers Pet – byline: Janet McMillan & Mitzi Sims (1975)
- The Casting Couch and Me – byline: Joan Wood (1975)
- Wall Street & Broad – byline: Teri Palmer (1976)

=== The J.D. Hardin western series ===
byline: J.D. Hardin

- Bloody Sands
- The Spirit & the Flesh
- Death Flotilla
- The Lone Star Massacre
- Raider’s Revenge
- Raider’s Hell
- Apache Gold
- Bibles, Bullets & Brides
- Death Lode

=== Other novels ===
- The Airport Affair (1975) – byline: David Toma & Jack Pearl
- The Affair of the Unhappy Hooker (1976) – byline: David Toma & Jack Pearl
- Sado Cop (1976) – byline: Nick Vasile
- A Member of the Family (1993) – byline: Nick Vasile
- Raven (1987) – byline: Mike Lundy
- Baby Farm (1987) – byline: Mike Lundy
- Daughter of the Sand (1978) – byline: Pamela South
- The Eagle & the Serpent (1982) – byline: Lee Jackson
- Texas Lily (1987) – byline: Stephanie Blake

=== Biographies and autobiographies ===
- Murder HE Wrote: A Successful Writer's Life (2006) (Autobiography)

=== Other books ===
- The Racing Flag (1965) – byline: Bloys Britt & Bill France
- Veronica (1969) – byline: Veronica Lake (her autobiography, whose ghostwriter he was)
- The Case Against Private Aviation (1969) – byline: Donald Bain
- Long John Nebel (1974) – byline: Donald Bain
- The Control of Candy Jones (1976) – byline: Donald Bain
- Club Tropique (1978) – byline: Donald Bain
- War in Illinois (1978) – byline: Donald Bain
- Charlie & the Shawneetown Dame (2004) – byline: Donald Bain
- Caviar, Caviar, Caviar (1981) – byline: Gerald M. Stein & Donald Bain
- The "Girls" in the Newsroom (1983) – byline: Marjorie Margolies
- The World’s Best Bartenders’ Guide (1998)– byline: Joseph Scott & Donald Bain
- Margaret Truman's Experiment in Murder (2012)
- Margaret Truman's Undiplomatic Murder (2014)
- Margaret Truman's Internship In Murder (2015)
- Margaret Truman's Deadly Medicine (2016)
- Margaret Truman's Allied in Danger (2017)

=== Unacknowledged books ===
A ghostwriter is often required to be anonymous as a part of the contract to write the book. Some sources claim Bain is the author of most of the mystery novels attributed to Margaret Truman. While Bain initially denied this, he wrote a column in the March 14, 2014 issue of Publishers Weekly and finally acknowledged writing "27 novels in the Margaret Truman Capital Crimes series (mostly bylined by Truman, my close collaborator – my name is on only the most recent entries, released after her death)."

== Personal life ==
Bain died of congestive heart failure on October 21, 2017, in White Plains, New York at the age of 82.

== See also ==
- United States novelists
- American literature
