= Lawrence of Arabia (soundtrack) =

1962 soundtrack album by Maurice Jarre

Lawrence of Arabia (Original Motion Picture Soundtrack)

Soundtrack album by Maurice Jarre
- Released: 1962
- Studio: Shepperton Studios
- Length: 33:21
- Label: Colpix Records

Lawrence of Arabia (Original Motion Picture Soundtrack) is the soundtrack album composed by Maurice Jarre for the 1962 film Lawrence of Arabia. The soundtrack garnered critical acclaim and won the Academy Award for Best Music Score—Substantially Original in 1963.

== Background ==
When choosing a composer for the film, director David Lean assumed that Malcolm Arnold—who had scored Lean's 1957 film The Bridge on the River Kwai—would compose for Lawrence of Arabia. When producer Sam Spiegel screened a rough draft of the film for Arnold and composer William Walton, however, the composers reportedly disliked the film, calling it "terrible" and "a travelogue that would require hours of music".

Spiegel then engaged Broadway composer Richard Rodgers to compose the film's soundtrack and young French composer Maurice Jarre—who had recently scored Sundays and Cybèle—to orchestrate it. Reportedly, Rodgers did not review any footage to compose themes for the film, and Lean and Spiegel were both extremely dissatisfied with his work, with Lean calling it "rubbish" and "nonsense". Jarre, meanwhile, had composed a piece called "The Theme from Lawrence of Arabia", which Lean liked so much that he asked Jarre to score the entire film.

== Production ==
Jarre had six weeks to compose the film's soundtrack. Because of the tight schedule, instead of orchestrating his own film music as he was accustomed to, he invited Gerard Schurmann to orchestrate. Jarre had originally brought Adrian Boult on to conduct; however, as Boult had no experience pacing the tempo of music to fit the action onscreen, Jarre conducted. Spiegel, wanting to keep as many prestigious names on board as possible, insisted that Boult's name still be listed in the film credits as having conducted. Jarre, however, is listed as the conductor on the record.

The soundtrack was performed by the London Philharmonic Orchestra, which consisted of 60 strings, 11 percussionists, two grand pianos, two harps, and three ondes Martenots. It was recorded at Shepperton Studios.

As in The Bridge on the River Kwai, which employed Kenneth Alford's "Colonel Bogey March", Lean wished to incorporate another Alford march in Lawrence of Arabia: "The Voice of the Guns". The march is used in the overture as well as in fragmentary motifs throughout the film.

== Legacy and accolades ==
Professional ratings
Review scores
Source	Rating
AllMusic	link

At the 35th Academy Awards, the soundtrack won the Academy Award for Best Music Score—Substantially Original. At the 6th Annual Grammy Awards, it was nominated for the Grammy Award for Best Original Score from a Motion Picture or Television Show and the Grammy Award for Best Instrumental Theme.

The score is considered to be one of the greatest scores of all time, ranking third on the AFI's 100 Years of Film Scores list in 2005. In 2013, it ranked sixth on the ABC Classic FM Classic 100 Music in the Movies.

Russian figure skater and Olympic gold medalist Alina Zagitova used the overture from the film's soundtrack for her free skate during the 2019–20 figure skating season.

== Track listing ==
Side 1
No.	Title	Length
1.	"Overture (Intro: 'The Voice of the Guns')"	4:14
2.	"Main Title"	1:54
3.	"Miracle"	3:08
4.	"Nefud Mirage"	2:20
5.	"Rescue of Gasim and Bringing Gasim into Camp"	5:46

Side 2
No.	Title	Length
1.	"Arrival at Auda's Camp"	2:01
2.	"The Voice of the Guns"	1:58
3.	"Continuation of the Miracle"	2:13
4.	"Suns Anvil"	3:04
5.	"Lawrence & Body Guard"	2:04
6.	"That Is the Desert"	2:51
7.	"End Title"	1:05
Total length:		33:21
