= Rapture (1965 film) =

1965 French film by John Guillermin

- Theatrical release poster
- Directed by: John Guillermin
- Screenplay by: Stanley Mann
- Based on: Rapture in My Rags by Phyllis Hastings
- Produced by: Christian Ferry
- Starring: Melvyn Douglas; Patricia Gozzi; Dean Stockwell; Gunnel Lindblom
- Cinematography: Marcel Grignon
- Edited by: Max Benedict; Françoise Diot
- Music by: Georges Delerue
- Production company: Panoramic Productions
- Distributed by: 20th Century Fox; International Classics
- Release dates: 25 August 1965 (Paris); 8 November 1965 (United States)
- Running time: 104 minutes
- Countries: France; United States
- Languages: French; English
- Box office: $1,310,000

Rapture (French: La fleur de l'âge) is a 1965 drama film directed by John Guillermin, and starring Melvyn Douglas, Patricia Gozzi, and Dean Stockwell. It was written by Stanley Mann based on the 1954 novel Rapture in My Rags by Phyliss Hastings.

It is reportedly Guillermin's own favorite among his films. His widow Mary Martindale said it "was the only film he directed that wholly satisfied his vision as an artist."

== Plot ==
Young teenager Agnes Larbaud, her retired widower father, Frederick and their caretaker Karen, live in an old house on the Brittany coast in France. Agnes, who is immature and perhaps backward, has been removed from school and lives an isolated and childlike life. While walking home from church, they witness a prison bus crash. The convicts attempt to flee and are shot at by the guards. One convict, Joseph, knocks down a guard and injures him before escaping.

Agnes finds Joseph in their shed. In her imagination, she thinks that she has created him from a scarecrow, and her creation belongs to her. She does not tell the police about him. The family hide him and he stays for a while. The gendarme dies and the police believe the family know something about the fugitive. He and Karen become close but Agnes catches them kissing and attacks Karen, who leaves.

Joseph leaves separately, refusing to go with Karen, but Agnes follows him and he brings her home. A relationship develops and, after, Frederick objects, they leave together for a town. However, she struggles to manage a household and returns home. The police question her about her absence. She says nothing but Joseph, following her home, is seen, chased and killed.

== Cast ==
- Melvyn Douglas as Frederick Larbaud
- Patricia Gozzi as Agnes Larbaud
- Dean Stockwell as Joseph
- Gunnel Lindblom as Karen
- Murray Evans as Young Gendarme
- Sylvia Kay as Genevieve
- Ellen Pollock as Landlady
- Peter Sallis as Armand
- Chris Sandford as Albert
- Leslie Sands as First Gendarme

== Production ==
=== Development ===
The film was based on the novel Rapture in My Rags by Phyllis Hastings published in 1954. The New York Times called it "a touching story". The Los Angeles Times called it "a tremendously worthwhile experience".

The book became a best seller in England. In 1957, film rights were bought by André Hakim, the son in law of Daryl F. Zanuck of 20th Century Fox, where Hakim had a production deal. Hakim beat out Carol Reed and Hecht-Hill-Lancaster who both wanted the novel. Hastings said he wanted Audrey Hepburn and Yul Brynner to play the leads. In March 1963, Zanuck listed the film on the slate of 20th Century Fox projects for that year, with a tentative start date of September 10.

=== Shooting ===
Filming began September 1964 in France. It was directed by John Guillermin who signed a four-picture deal with Fox.

Serge Bourguignon, who had directed Patricia Gozzi in Sundays and Cybele later said Zanuck wanted him to direct the film "but I didn't want to do it. He said, "Well, you can do it with the same style," but I refused. So they hired Guillermin, who is a very good director, but Patricia didn't get along with him at all.

Dean Stockwell later recalled:

Rapture could have been interesting but didn’t turn out to be that interesting. It was a little film with a girl named Patricia Gozzi who had a great deal of success in a film prior to this one. I don’t think she went on to a career after that. But I had a hell of a time working in France, I loved it! The director, John Guillermin, was kind of a maniac. He’s known to be a maniac, and he is! I got along with him pretty well, though. But, I don’t think it was a good film.

== Reception ==
=== Critical ===
The Monthly Film Bulletin wrote: "This sentimental tear-jerker would appear to have been designed as a vehicle for Patricia Gozzi, and the basic situation has certain resemblances with Sundays and Cybèle, though the influence seems to be more the silent Swedish cinema. The atmosphere of repressed and confused sexuality is very clumsily conveyed, with symbolism thickly laid on and would-be lyrical photography that merely calls attention to itself. The oddly assorted cast seem unable to adjust to one another; and though Dean Stockwell comes off reasonably well, Patricia Gozzi lacks the experience to make her admittedly unbelievable role in any way convincing."

Time magazine called the film a "penumbral play of love against loneliness" that "boost[s] the artistic stock of English director John Guillermin" and "clinch[es] the reputation of France's 15-year-old Patricia Gozzi".

The Los Angeles Times called it "a beautifully made movie of nuances".

=== Box office ===
According to Fox records, the film needed to earn $2,500,000 in rentals to break even and made $1,310,000, meaning it made a loss.

== See also ==
- List of American films of 1965
