= Hung Up (film) =

- Film poster
- Directed by: Édouard Luntz
- Written by: Jean Duvignaud
- Produced by: Christian Ferry; André Hakim; Darryl F. Zanuck
- Starring: Patricia Gozzi; Calvin Lockhart
- Cinematography: Jean Badal
- Edited by: Colette Kouchner; Suzanne Sandberg
- Music by: Baden Powell
- Production companies: Darryl F. Zanuck Productions; Les Films du Siècle; Les Productions Fox Europa
- Distributed by: Twentieth Century Fox
- Release date: 10 May 1973
- Countries: France; United Kingdom; United States
- Languages: French; English

Hung Up (French: Le grabuge) is a 1973 French film directed by Édouard Luntz. The film stars Patricia Gozzi, Julie Dassin, Jany Holt, and Calvin Lockhart.

The film was Gozzi's final film.

== Plot ==
A young woman in a loveless marriage escapes her dull reality by dreaming of living a life involving smuggling and hijacking ships at night. She has visions of being kidnapped by Pablo, the leader of a gang of smugglers, and eventually falls in love with her kidnapper.
