= Lawrence of Arabia (film) =

1962 film directed by David Lean

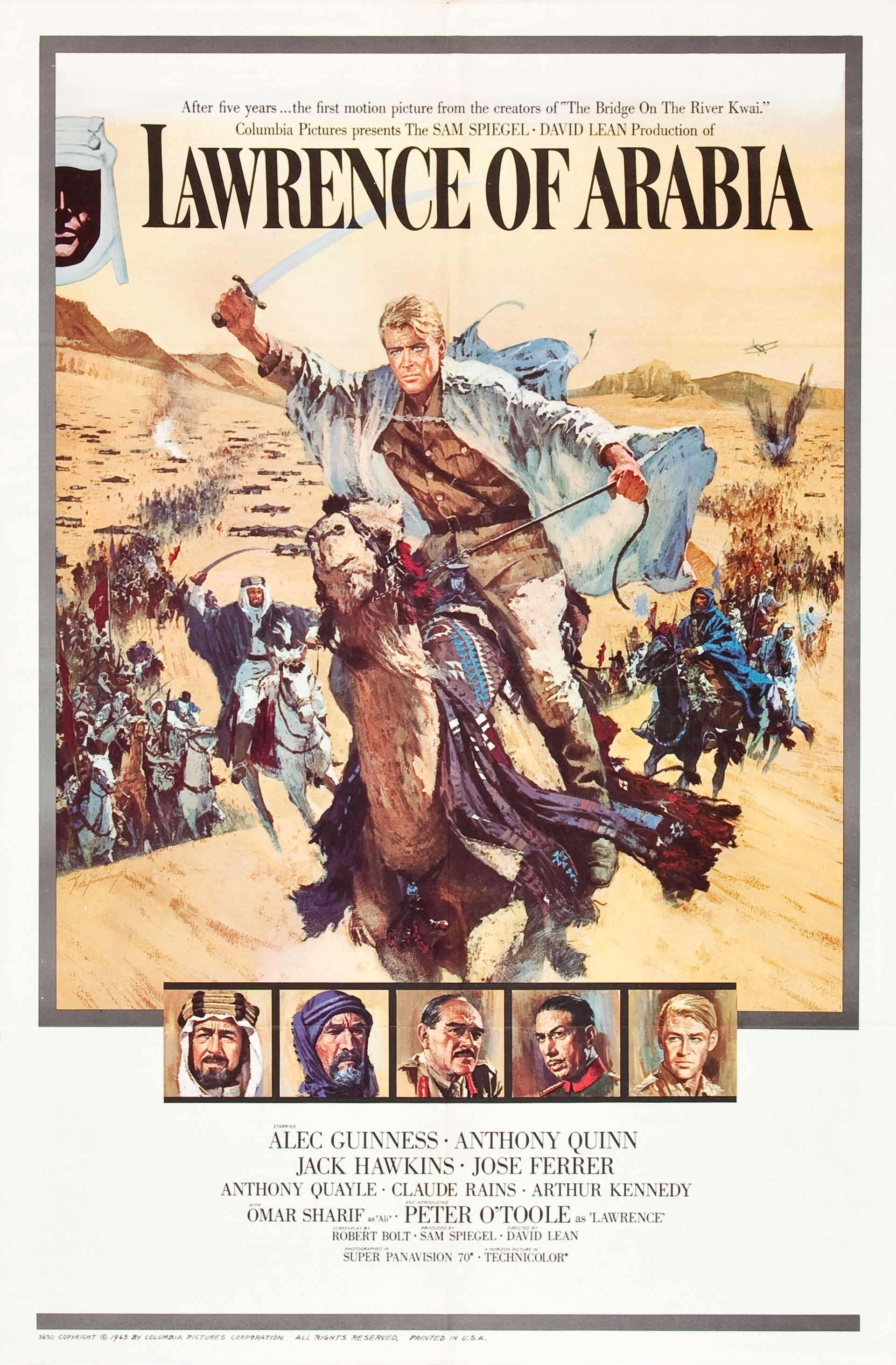
- Theatrical release poster by Howard Terpning
- Directed by: David Lean
- Screenplay by: Robert Bolt; Michael Wilson
- Produced by: Sam Spiegel
- Starring: Alec Guinness; Anthony Quinn; Jack Hawkins; José Ferrer; Anthony Quayle; Claude Rains; Arthur Kennedy; Omar Sharif; Peter O'Toole
- Cinematography: Freddie A. Young
- Edited by: Anne V. Coates
- Music by: Maurice Jarre
- Production company: Horizon Pictures
- Distributed by: Columbia Pictures
- Release date: 16 December 1962
- Running time: 222 minutes
- Countries: United Kingdom; United States
- Language: English
- Budget: $15 million
- Box office: $70 million

Lawrence of Arabia is a 1962 epic biographical drama film directed by David Lean and produced by Sam Spiegel through the latter's British company Horizon Pictures and distributed by Columbia Pictures. It is based on the life of T. E. Lawrence and his 1926 book Seven Pillars of Wisdom (also known as Revolt in the Desert). Lawrence of Arabia introduces Peter O'Toole as Lawrence, with Alec Guinness playing Prince Faisal. It also stars Jack Hawkins, Anthony Quinn, Omar Sharif, Anthony Quayle, Claude Rains, Jose Ferrer and Arthur Kennedy. The screenplay was written by Robert Bolt and Michael Wilson.

Lawrence of Arabia depicts Lawrence's experiences in the Ottoman provinces of Hejaz and Syria during the First World War, in particular his attacks on Aqaba and Damascus and his involvement in the Arab National Council. Its themes include Lawrence's emotional struggles with the violence inherent in war, his identity, and his divided allegiance between Britain and his new-found comrades within the Arabian desert tribes.

In 1963, Lawrence of Arabia was nominated for ten Oscars at the 35th Academy Awards, winning seven, including Best Picture and Best Director. It also won the Golden Globe Award for Best Motion Picture – Drama and the BAFTA Awards for Best Film and Outstanding British Film. The dramatic score by Maurice Jarre and the Super Panavision 70 cinematography by Freddie Young also won praise from critics.

Lawrence of Arabia is widely regarded as one of the greatest films ever made. In 1991, it was deemed "culturally, historically, or aesthetically significant" by the United States Library of Congress and selected for preservation in the National Film Registry. Although primarily a British production, it was eligible due to Columbia Pictures involvement in financing and making the production, as well as helping get the film released. In 1998, the American Film Institute placed Lawrence of Arabia fifth on their list of the greatest American films; in 2007, they placed it seventh on an updated list. The British Film Institute named Lawrence of Arabia the third-greatest British film in 1999. In 2004, it was voted the best British film in The Sunday Telegraph's poll of Britain's leading filmmakers.

== Plot ==
T. E. Lawrence dies in a motorcycle accident in 1935. At a memorial service at St Paul's Cathedral, it becomes clear that several influential Britons disliked him.

During the First World War, Lawrence is a misfit British Army lieutenant, notable for his effrontery and education. Mr. Dryden of the Arab Bureau sends him to meet with Colonel Harry Brighton, who advises Prince Feisal in his revolt against the Turks. Lawrence is outraged when his guide is killed by Sherif Ali ibn el Kharish for drinking from the latter's well. Lawrence accuses Ali of being a barbarian and is dismayed to learn that the latter is Feisal's advisor.

Relations between the British and the Arabs are tense. While the British will supply guns to the Arabs, they will not provide artillery, which would make Feisal an independent force. Feisal is impressed by Lawrence's familiarity with the Quran and his honesty about British interests in Arabia.

Lawrence violates Brighton's orders by convincing Feisal to launch a surprise attack on Aqaba to improve his supply lines. Ali protests, as Aqaba is protected from land attacks by the Nefud Desert and the local Turkish enforcer, Howeitat tribal leader Auda Abu Tayi. Feisal gives Lawrence just fifty men. Lawrence hires teenage orphans Daud and Farraj as his attendants.

During the march to Aqaba, Lawrence wins over Feisal's men by returning to the desert to rescue Gasim. The grateful Arabs give Lawrence traditional clothing. Lawrence convinces Auda to switch sides by promising him a Turkish gold hoard at Aqaba. En route, Lawrence is shaken when he must execute Gasim to prevent a conflict between Feisal's men and Auda's.

Lawrence and Auda capture Aqaba, but there is no gold. To placate Auda, Lawrence agrees to ask his superiors in Cairo for more money. Daud is drowned by quicksand along the way.

In Cairo, Lawrence perplexes the British officers with his Arab clothes and his insistence that Farraj be treated with the same respect as a British officer. General Edmund Allenby promotes Lawrence to major and backs the Arabs with arms and money. Lawrence asks Allenby whether the Arabs are correct that the British seek to dominate Arabia and demands artillery for Feisal's army. Allenby lies to him on both counts.

Lawrence launches a guerrilla war against the Turks. The American media romanticise Lawrence's exploits and make him famous, as American journalist Jackson Bentley is looking to highlight the "more adventurous aspects" of war to help draw the United States into the fight. Ali urges Lawrence to slow down, but the latter ignores him. Farraj is injured during a raid, and Lawrence kills him to save him from the Turks, who torture their captives.

The Turks capture Lawrence while he scouts Deraa. The Turkish Bey orders him stripped, ogled, prodded and beaten—and, it is implied, raped. (Note: This is apparently based on an actual story Lawrence told in 1919.) Ali rescues him, but the experience leaves Lawrence shaken and humbled.

Dryden informs Lawrence about the Sykes–Picot Agreement, which will partition the Middle East between Britain and France. Allenby urges Lawrence to return to Arabia to support the "big push" on Damascus. Lawrence feels betrayed but complies. He recruits an army with little interest in Arab liberation. Lawrence hopes that if the Arabs can take Damascus before the British, they will be able to demand an independent Arab state.

Lawrence's army sights a column of retreating Turkish soldiers who have just massacred the residents of Tafas. One of Lawrence's men is from Tafas and demands that the Arab army take no prisoners. Ali insists on proceeding to Damascus, but the man charges alone and is killed. Lawrence takes up his battle cry, and the Arabs massacre the Turks.

The Arabs beat the British to Damascus. Lawrence advises them to run the city without British support, but the tribesmen bicker constantly, the public utilities fail, and the understaffed hospitals barely function. Feisal discards Lawrence's dream of Arab independence in exchange for British support.

Lawrence returns to the British Army. The British promote Lawrence to colonel and order him back to Britain. As he leaves Damascus, he looks longingly at the departing Arabs before his car is passed by a motorcyclist.

== Cast ==
- Peter O'Toole as T. E. Lawrence. Albert Finney was a virtual unknown at the time but he was Lean's first choice to play Lawrence. Finney underwent a successful screen test but turned down the part as he did not want to sign a long-term contract with producer Sam Spiegel. Marlon Brando was also offered the part, while Anthony Perkins and Montgomery Clift were briefly considered before O'Toole was cast. Spiegel disliked Clift, having worked with him on Suddenly, Last Summer (1959). Alec Guinness had played Lawrence in the play Ross and was briefly considered for the part, but Lean and Spiegel thought him too old. Lean had seen O'Toole in The Day They Robbed the Bank of England (1960) and was bowled over by his screen test, proclaiming, "This is Lawrence!" Spiegel eventually acceded to Lean's choice. Pictures of Lawrence suggest also that O'Toole bore some resemblance to him, though at 6 feet 2 inches (1.88 m) tall O'Toole was significantly taller than Lawrence. O'Toole's looks prompted a different reaction from Noël Coward, who quipped after seeing the première of the film, "If you had been any prettier, the film would have been called Florence of Arabia".
- Alec Guinness as Prince Faisal ("Feisal" in the credits). Faisal was originally to be portrayed by Laurence Olivier. Guinness had performed in other David Lean films, and he got the part when Olivier dropped out. Guinness was made up to look as much like the real Faisal as possible; he recorded in his diaries that while shooting in Jordan he met several people who had known Faisal who actually mistook him for the late prince. Guinness said in interviews that he developed his Arab accent from a conversation that he had with Omar Sharif.
- Anthony Quinn as Auda Abu Tayi. Quinn got very much into his role; he spent hours applying his own makeup, using a photograph of the real Auda to make himself look as much like him as he could. One anecdote has Quinn arriving on set for the first time in full costume, whereupon Lean mistook him for a native and asked his assistant to ring Quinn and notify him that they were replacing him with the new arrival.
- Jack Hawkins as General Edmund Allenby. Spiegel pushed Lean to cast Cary Grant or Laurence Olivier (who was engaged at the Chichester Festival Theatre and declined). Lean convinced him to choose Hawkins because of his work for them on The Bridge on the River Kwai (1957). Hawkins shaved his head for the role and reportedly clashed with Lean several times during filming. Guinness recounted that Hawkins was reprimanded by Lean for celebrating the end of a day's filming with an impromptu dance. Hawkins became close friends with O'Toole during filming, and the two often improvised dialogue during takes, to Lean's dismay.
- Omar Sharif as Sherif Ali ibn el Kharish. The role was offered to many actors before Sharif was cast. Horst Buchholz was the first choice but had already signed on for the film One, Two, Three. Alain Delon had a successful screen test but ultimately declined because of the brown contact lenses he would have had to wear. Maurice Ronet and Indian actor Dilip Kumar were also considered. Sharif, who was already a major star in the Middle East, was originally cast as Lawrence's guide Tafas, but when other actors proved unsuitable, Sharif was given the part of Ali. An amalgamation of numerous Arab leaders, particularly Faisal's cousin Sharif Nassir, who led the Harith forces in the attack on Aqaba, this character was created largely because Lawrence did not serve with any single Arab leader, aside from Auda, throughout the majority of the war.
- José Ferrer as the Turkish Bey. Ferrer was initially dissatisfied with the small size of his part and accepted the role only on the condition of being paid $25,000 (more than O'Toole and Sharif combined) plus a Porsche. Afterwards, Ferrer considered this his best film performance, saying in an interview: "If I was to be judged by any one film performance, it would be my five minutes in Lawrence". Peter O'Toole once said that he learned more about screen acting from Ferrer than he could in any acting class. According to Lawrence in Seven Pillars of Wisdom, this was General Hajim Bey (in Turkish, Hacim Muhiddin Bey), though the film does not name him. Biographers including Jeremy Wilson and John Mack have argued that Lawrence's account is to be believed; others including Michael Asher and Lawrence James argue that contemporary evidence suggests that Lawrence never went to Deraa at this time and that the story is invented.
- Anthony Quayle as Colonel Harry Brighton. Quayle, a veteran of military roles, was cast after Jack Hawkins, the original choice, was shifted to the part of Allenby. Quayle and Lean argued over how to portray the character, with Lean feeling Brighton to be an honourable character, while Quayle thought him an idiot. He is in essence a composite of all of the British officers who served in the Middle East with Lawrence, most notably Lieutenant Colonel S. F. Newcombe (in Michael Wilson's original script, the character was named Colonel Newcombe before Robert Bolt changed it). Like Brighton in the film, Newcombe was Lawrence's predecessor as liaison to the Arab Revolt; he and many of his men were captured by the Turks in 1916, but Newcombe escaped. Brighton was created to represent how ordinary British soldiers would feel about a man like Lawrence: impressed by his accomplishments but repulsed by his affected manner.
- Claude Rains as Mr Dryden. Like Sherif Ali and Colonel Brighton, Dryden was an amalgamation of several historical figures, primarily Ronald Storrs, a member of the Arab Bureau, but also David Hogarth, an archaeologist friend of Lawrence; Henry McMahon, the High Commissioner of Egypt who negotiated the McMahon–Hussein Correspondence which began the Arab Revolt, and Mark Sykes, who helped draw up the Sykes–Picot Agreement, which partitioned the post-war Middle East. Robert Bolt stated that the character was created to "represent the civilian and political wing of British interests, to balance Allenby's military objectives".
- Arthur Kennedy as Jackson Bentley. In the early days of the production, when the Bentley character had a more prominent role, Kirk Douglas was considered for the part; Douglas expressed interest but demanded a star salary and the highest billing after O'Toole and thus was turned down by Spiegel. Later, Edmond O'Brien was cast in the part. O'Brien filmed the Jerusalem scene and (according to Omar Sharif) Bentley's political discussion with Ali, but he suffered a heart attack on location and had to be replaced at the last moment by Kennedy, who was recommended to Lean by Anthony Quinn. The character was based on famed American journalist Lowell Thomas, whose reports helped make Lawrence famous. Thomas was a young man at the time who spent only weeks at most with Lawrence in the field, unlike Bentley, who is a middle-aged man present for all of Lawrence's later campaigns. Bentley was the narrator in Wilson's original script, but Bolt reduced his role significantly in the final treatment.
- Donald Wolfit as General Archibald Murray. He releases Lawrence to Mr Dryden.
- I. S. Johar as Gasim. Johar was a well-known Indian actor who occasionally appeared in international productions.
- Gamil Ratib as Majid. Ratib was a veteran Egyptian actor. His English was not considered good enough, so he was dubbed by an uncredited Robert Rietti in the final edit.
- Michel Ray as Farraj. At the time, Ray was a rising Anglo-Brazilian actor who had appeared in several films, including Irving Rapper's The Brave One (1956) and Anthony Mann's The Tin Star (1957).
- John Dimech as Daud
- Zia Mohyeddin as Tafas. Mohyeddin, one of Pakistan's best-known actors, played a character based on Lawrence's actual guide, Sheikh Obeid el-Rashid of the Hazimi branch of the Beni Salem, whom Lawrence referred to as Tafas several times in Seven Pillars.
- Howard Marion-Crawford as the medical officer. He was cast at the last minute during the filming of the Damascus scenes in Seville. The character was based on an officer mentioned in an incident in Seven Pillars of Wisdom. Lawrence's meeting the officer again while in British uniform was an invention of the script.
- Jack Gwillim as the club secretary. Gwillim was recommended to Lean for the film by close friend Quayle.
- Hugh Miller as the RAMC colonel. He worked on several of Lean's films as a dialogue coach and was one of several members of the film crew to be given bit parts (see below).
- Peter Burton as a Damascus sheik (uncredited)
- Kenneth Fortescue as Allenby's aide (uncredited)
- Harry Fowler as Corporal William Potter (uncredited)
- Jack Hedley as a reporter (uncredited)
- Ian MacNaughton as Corporal Michael George Hartley, Lawrence's companion in O'Toole's first scene (uncredited)
- Henry Oscar as Silliam, Faisal's servant (uncredited)
- Norman Rossington as Corporal Jenkins (uncredited)
- John Ruddock as Elder Harith (uncredited)
- Fernando Sancho as the Turkish sergeant (uncredited)
- Stuart Saunders as the regimental sergeant major (uncredited)
- Bryan Pringle as the driver of the car which takes Lawrence away at the end of the film (uncredited)

The crew consisted of over 200 people. Including cast and extras, over 1,000 people worked on the film. Members of the crew portrayed minor characters. First assistant director Roy Stevens played the truck driver who transports Lawrence and Farraj to the Cairo HQ at the end of Act I; the sergeant who stops Lawrence and Farraj ("Where do you think you're going to, Mustapha?") is construction assistant Fred Bennett, and screenwriter Robert Bolt has a wordless cameo as one of the officers watching Allenby and Lawrence confer in the courtyard (he is smoking a pipe). Steve Birtles, the film's gaffer, played the motorcyclist at the Suez Canal; Lean is rumoured to have provided the cyclist's voice shouting "Who are you?" Continuity supervisor Barbara Cole appeared as one of the nurses in the Damascus hospital scene.

It may be the longest theatrical film with no female speaking roles. Women appear in crowd scenes or as extras.

== Historical accuracy ==
Most of the film's characters are based on historical figures but to varying degrees. Some scenes were heavily fictionalised, such as the Battle of Aqaba, and those dealing with the Arab Council since the council remained more or less in power in Syria until France deposed Faisal in 1920. Little background is provided on the history of the region, the First World War, and the Arab Revolt, probably because of Bolt's increased focus on Lawrence (Wilson's draft script had a broader, more politicised version of events). The second half of the film focuses on Lawrence's disillusionment as his attempts to convert battlefield victories into the basis for an independent Arab state fail.

The film's timeline inaccurately depicts the chronology of the Arab Revolt and First World War, as well as the geography of the Hejaz region. Bentley's meeting with Faisal in which he mentions that the United States has not yet entered the war is in late 1917 after the fall of Aqaba, months after the American entry into the war. Lawrence's involvement in the Arab Revolt prior to the attack on Aqaba is absent, as are his involvement in the seizures of Yenbo and Wejh. The rescue and the execution of Gasim are based on two incidents that were conflated for dramatic reasons.

The film shows Lawrence representing the Allied cause in the Hejaz almost alone, with Colonel Brighton (Anthony Quayle) as the only British officer there to assist him. In fact, there were numerous British officers such as colonels Cyril Wilson, Stewart Newcombe, and Pierce C. Joyce, all of whom arrived before Lawrence began serving in Arabia. There was a French military mission led by Colonel Édouard Brémond serving in the Hejaz but it is not mentioned in the film. The film shows Lawrence as the originator of the attacks on the Hejaz railway. The first attacks began in early January 1917, led by officers such as Newcombe. The first successful attack on the Hejaz railway with a locomotive-destroying "Garland mine" was led by Major Herbert Garland in February 1917, a month before Lawrence's first attack.

The film shows the Hashemite forces consisting of Bedouin guerrillas, but the core of the Hashemite force was the regular Arab Army recruited from Ottoman Arab prisoners of war. They wore British-style uniforms with keffiyehs and fought in conventional battles. The film makes no mention of the Sharifian Army and leaves the viewer with the impression that the Hashemite forces were composed exclusively of Bedouin irregulars.

=== Representation of Lawrence ===
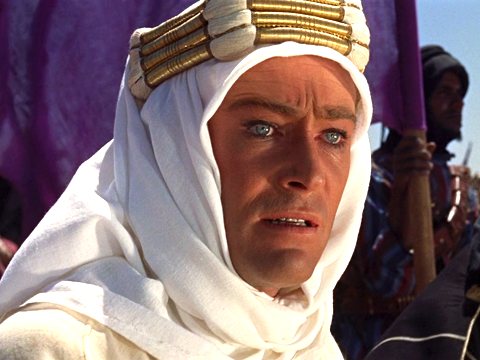
Peter O'Toole as T. E. Lawrence

Many complaints about the film's accuracy concern the characterisation of Lawrence. The perceived problems with the portrayal begin with the differences in his physical appearance — the 6 ft 2 in (1.88 m) Peter O'Toole was almost 9 in (23 cm) taller than the 5 ft 5 in (1.65 m) Lawrence — and extended to his behaviour.

The screenwriters depict Lawrence as an egotist. It is not clear to what degree Lawrence sought or shunned attention, as evidenced by his use of various assumed names after the war. Even during the war, Lowell Thomas wrote in With Lawrence in Arabia that he could take pictures of him only by tricking him, although Lawrence later agreed to pose for several photos for Thomas's stage show. Thomas's famous comment that Lawrence "had a genius for backing into the limelight" suggests that his extraordinary actions prevented him from being as private as he would have liked, or may suggest that Lawrence made a pretence of avoiding the limelight but subtly placed himself at centre stage. Others point to Lawrence's writings to support the argument that he was egotistical.

Lawrence's sexual orientation remains a controversial topic among historians. Bolt's primary source was ostensibly Seven Pillars, but the film's portrayal seems informed by Richard Aldington's Biographical Inquiry (1955), which posited Lawrence as a "pathological liar and exhibitionist" as well as a homosexual. That is opposed to his portrayal in Ross as a "physically and spiritually broken recluse". Historians like B. H. Liddell Hart disputed the film's depiction of Lawrence as an active participant in the attack and slaughter of the retreating Turkish columns who had committed the Tafas massacre, but most current biographers accept the film's portrayal as reasonably accurate.

The film shows that Lawrence spoke and read Arabic, could quote the Quran and was reasonably knowledgeable about the region. It barely mentions his archaeological travels from 1911 to 1914 in Syria and Arabia and ignores his espionage work, including a pre-war topographical survey of the Sinai Peninsula and his attempts to negotiate the release of British prisoners at Kut, Mesopotamia, in 1916. Lawrence is made aware of the Sykes–Picot Agreement very late in the story and is shown to be appalled by it, but he may well have known about it much earlier while he fought with the Arabs.

Lawrence's biographers have a mixed reaction towards the film. The authorised biographer Jeremy Wilson noted that the film has "undoubtedly influenced the perceptions of some subsequent biographers", such as the depiction of the film's Ali being a real rather than a composite character and the highlighting of the Deraa incident. The film's historical inaccuracies, in Wilson's view, are more questionable than should be allowed under normal dramatic licence. Liddell Hart criticised the film and engaged Bolt in a lengthy correspondence over its portrayal of Lawrence.

According to Sonoma State University associate professor Ajay Gehlawat, the portrayal of Lawrence also qualifies as a cinematic white saviour.

=== Representation of other characters ===
The film portrays Allenby as cynical and manipulative with a superior attitude to Lawrence, but there is much evidence that Allenby and Lawrence liked and respected each other. Lawrence once said that Allenby was "an admiration of mine" and later that he was "physically large and confident and morally so great that the comprehension of our littleness came slow to him". The fictional Allenby's words at Lawrence's funeral in the film stand in contrast to the real Allenby's remarks upon Lawrence's death,

I have lost a good friend and a valued comrade. Lawrence was under my command, but, after acquainting him with my strategical plan, I gave him a free hand. His co-operation was marked by the utmost loyalty, and I never had anything but praise for his work, which, indeed, was invaluable throughout the campaign."

Allenby spoke highly of him numerous times and much to Lawrence's delight publicly endorsed the accuracy of Seven Pillars of Wisdom. Although Allenby manipulated Lawrence during the war, their relationship lasted for years afterwards, indicating that in real life they were friendly, if not close. The Allenby family was particularly upset by the Damascus scenes, in which Allenby coldly allows the town to fall into chaos as the Arab Council collapses.

Murray was initially sceptical of the Arab Revolt's potential but thought highly of Lawrence's abilities as an intelligence officer. It was largely through Lawrence's persuasion that Murray came to support the revolt. The intense dislike shown toward Lawrence in the film is the opposite of Murray's real feelings, but Lawrence seemed not to hold Murray in any high regard.

The depiction of Auda Abu Tayi as a man interested only in loot and money is at odds with the historical record. Although Auda at first joined the revolt for monetary reasons, he became a steadfast supporter of Arab independence, notably after Aqaba's capture. Despite repeated bribery attempts by the Turks, he took their money but remained loyal to the revolt and went so far as to knock out his false teeth, which were Turkish-made. He was present with Lawrence from the beginning of the Aqaba expedition and helped to plan it, along with Lawrence and Prince Faisal. Faisal was not the middle-aged man depicted, as he was in his early thirties. Faisal and Lawrence respected each other's capabilities and intelligence and worked well together.

The reactions of those who knew Lawrence and the other characters cast doubt on the film's veracity. The most vehement critic of its accuracy was Professor A. W. Lawrence, T. E. Lawrence's younger brother and literary executor, who had sold the rights to Seven Pillars of Wisdom to Spiegel for £25,000 and went on a campaign in the United States and Britain to denounce the film. He said, "I should not have recognised my own brother". In one pointed talk show appearance, he remarked that he had found the film "pretentious and false" and that his brother was "one of the nicest, kindest and most exhilarating people I've known. He often appeared cheerful when he was unhappy". Later, he said to The New York Times, "[The film is] a psychological recipe. Take an ounce of narcissism, a pound of exhibitionism, a pint of sadism, a gallon of blood-lust and a sprinkle of other aberrations and stir well." Lowell Thomas was critical of the portrayal of Lawrence and of most of the film's characters and believed that the train attack scenes were the only reasonably accurate aspect of the film. Criticisms were not restricted to Lawrence. Allenby's family lodged a formal complaint against Columbia about his portrayal. Descendants of Auda Abu Tayi and Sharif Nassir (upon whom the film's Ali was partially based) went further by suing Columbia. The Auda case went on for almost 10 years before it was dropped.

The film has its defenders. Biographer Michael Korda, the author of Hero: The Life and Legend of Lawrence of Arabia, offers a different opinion. The film is neither "the full story of Lawrence's life or a completely accurate account of the two years he spent fighting with the Arabs". Korda said that criticising its inaccuracy "misses the point". "The object was to produce, not a faithful docudrama that would educate the audience, but a hit picture". Stephen E. Tabachnick goes further than Korda by arguing that the film's portrayal of Lawrence is "appropriate and true to the text of Seven Pillars of Wisdom". David Murphy, historian and author of the 2008 book The Arab Revolt, wrote that although the film was flawed with inaccuracies and omissions, "it was a truly epic movie and is rightly seen as a classic".

== Production ==
=== Background and pre-production ===
Previous films about T. E. Lawrence had been planned but had not been made. In the 1940s, Alexander Korda was interested in filming Seven Pillars of Wisdom with Laurence Olivier, Leslie Howard, or Robert Donat as Lawrence, but had to pull out owing to financial difficulties. David Lean had been approached to direct a 1952 version for the Rank Organisation, but the project fell through. At the same time as pre-production of the film, Terence Rattigan was developing his play Ross which centred primarily on Lawrence's alleged homosexuality. Ross had begun as a screenplay but was re-written for the stage when the film project fell through. Sam Spiegel grew furious and attempted to have the play suppressed, which helped to gain publicity for the film. Dirk Bogarde had accepted the role in Ross; he described the cancellation of the project as "my bitterest disappointment". Alec Guinness played the role on stage.

Lean and Sam Spiegel had worked together on The Bridge on the River Kwai and decided to collaborate again. For a time, Lean was interested in a biopic of Gandhi, with Alec Guinness to play the title role and Emeric Pressburger writing the screenplay. He eventually lost interest in the project, despite extensive pre-production work, including location scouting in India and a meeting with Jawaharlal Nehru. Lean then returned his attention to T. E. Lawrence. Columbia Pictures had an interest in a Lawrence project dating back to the early 1950s, and the project got underway when Spiegel convinced a reluctant A. W. Lawrence to sell the rights to Seven Pillars of Wisdom for £22,500.

Michael Wilson wrote the original draft of the screenplay. Lean was dissatisfied with Wilson's work, primarily because his treatment focused on the historical and political aspects of the Arab Revolt. Spiegel hired Robert Bolt to re-write the script to make it a character study of Lawrence. Many of the characters and scenes are Wilson's invention, but virtually all of the dialogue in the finished film was written by Bolt.

Lean reportedly watched John Ford's 1956 film The Searchers to help him develop ideas as to how to shoot the film. Several scenes directly recall Ford's film, most notably Ali's entrance at the well and the composition of many of the desert scenes and the dramatic exit from Wadi Rum. Lean biographer Kevin Brownlow noted a physical similarity between Wadi Rum and Ford's Monument Valley.

In an interview with The Washington Post in 1989, Lean said that Lawrence and Ali were written as being in a gay relationship. When asked about whether the film was "pervasively homoerotic", Lean responded:

Yes. Of course it is. Throughout. I'll never forget standing there in the desert once, with some of these tough Arab buggers, some of the toughest we had, and I suddenly thought, "He's making eyes at me!" And he was! So it does pervade it, the whole story, and certainly Lawrence was very if not entirely homosexual. We thought we were being very daring at the time: Lawrence and Omar, Lawrence and the Arab boys.

Lean also compared Ali and Lawrence's romance in the film to the relationship of the two main characters in his 1945 film Brief Encounter.

=== Filming ===
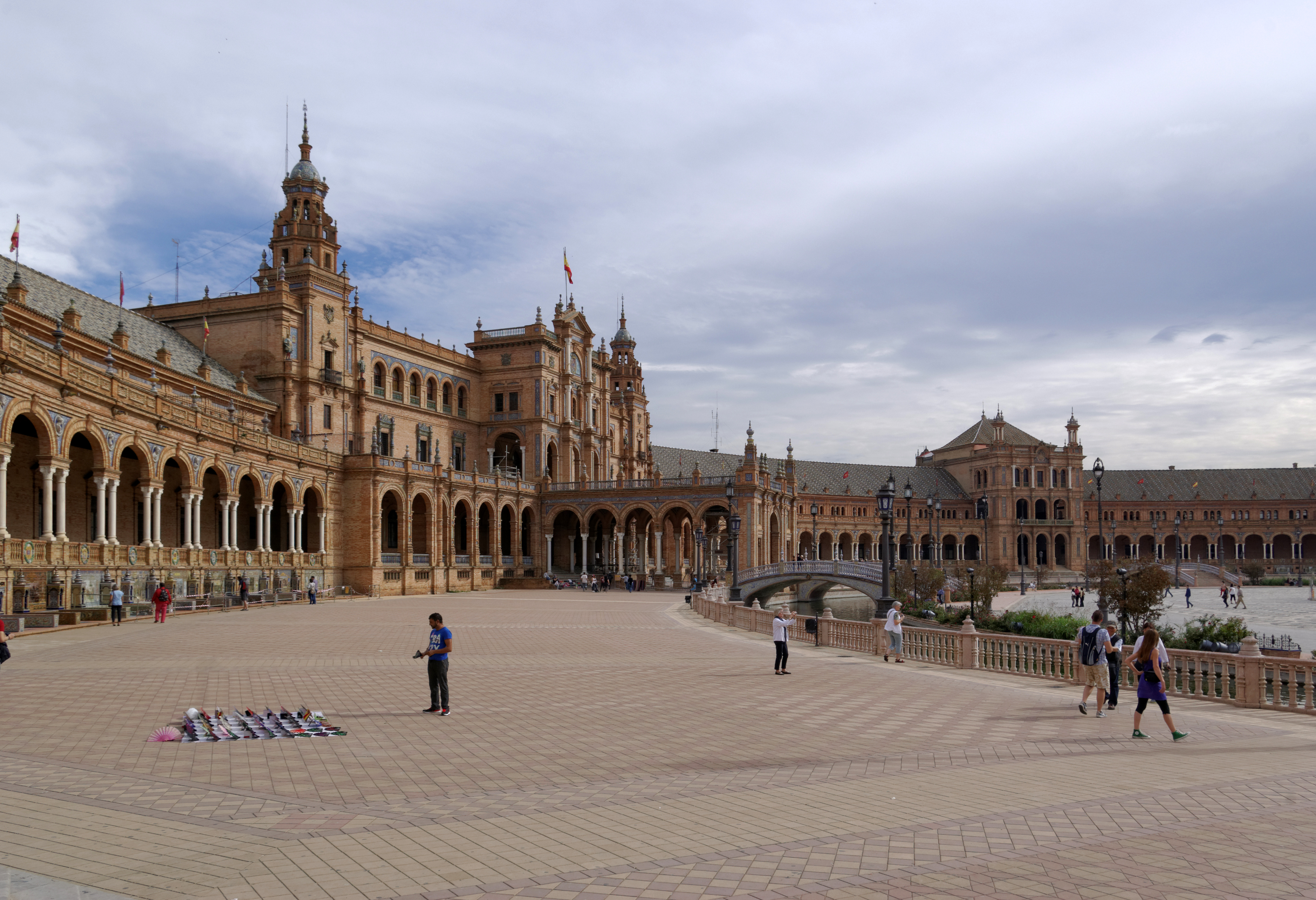
The Plaza de España, Seville appeared as Britain's Egyptian Expeditionary Force Headquarters in Cairo, which included the officers' club.

The film was made by Horizon Pictures and Columbia Pictures. Horizon Pictures were the main leading studio behind the making of the film while Columbia Pictures gave significant financial backing for the production and provided distribution of the release. Principal photography began on 15 May 1961 and ended on 21 September 1962. The desert scenes were shot in Jordan and Morocco and Almería and Doñana in Spain. It was originally to be filmed entirely in Jordan; the government of King Hussein was extremely helpful in providing logistical assistance, location scouting, transport and extras. Hussein visited the set several times during production and maintained cordial relationships with cast and crew. The only tension occurred when Jordanian officials learned that English actor Henry Oscar did not speak Arabic but would be filmed reciting the Quran. Permission was granted only on condition that an imam be present to ensure that there were no misquotations.

Lean planned to film in Aqaba and the archaeological site at Petra, which Lawrence had been fond of as a place of study. The production had to be moved to Spain due to cost and outbreaks of illness among the cast and crew before these scenes could be shot. The attack on Aqaba was reconstructed in a dried river bed in Playa del Algarrobico, southern Spain (at 37°1′25″N 1°52′53″W); it consisted of more than 300 buildings and was meticulously based on the town's appearance in 1917. The execution of Gasim, the train attacks, and Deraa exteriors were filmed in the Almería region, with some of the filming being delayed because of a flash flood. The Sierra Nevada mountains filled in for Azraq, Lawrence's winter quarters. The city of Seville was used to represent Cairo, Jerusalem and Damascus, with the appearance of Casa de Pilatos as Jerusalem British headquarters, the Alcázar of Seville as Damascus' town hall courtyard, the Plaza de América, the Casino from Teatro Lope de Vega (Seville) for the final Arab Council meeting, the basement of the Peruvian pavilion, Seville as both match and Bey's torture scenes and the Plaza de España as British headquarters in Cairo. All of the interiors were shot in Spain, including Lawrence's first meeting with Faisal and the scene in Auda's tent. The Tafas massacre was filmed in Ouarzazate, Morocco, with Moroccan soldiers substituting for the Turkish army; Lean could not film as much as he wanted because the soldiers were uncooperative and impatient.

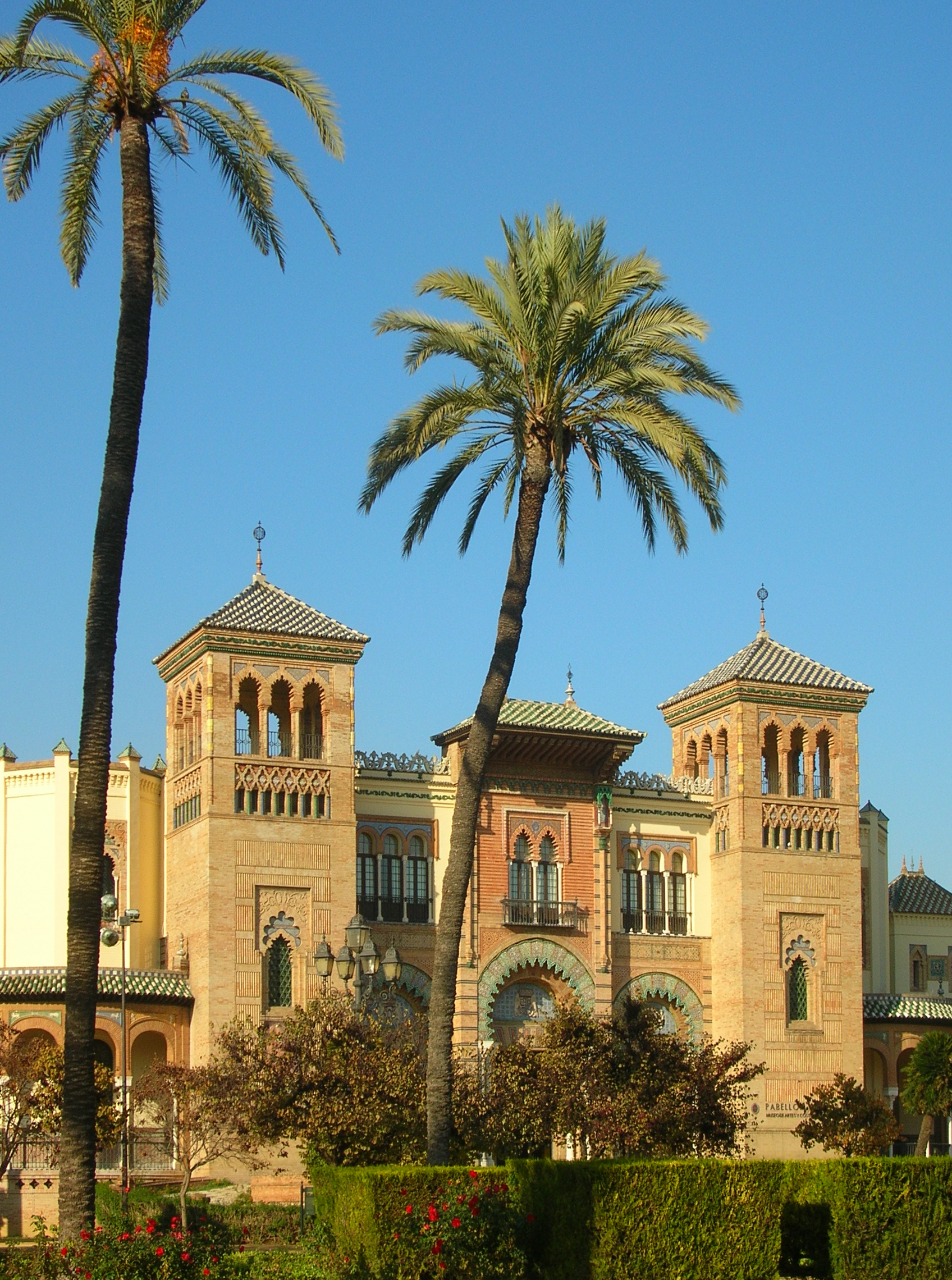
The Mudéjar pavilion of the Parque de María Luisa in Seville appeared as Damascus.

O'Toole was not used to riding camels and found the saddle to be uncomfortable. During a break in filming, he bought a piece of foam rubber at a market and added it to his saddle. Many of the extras copied the idea and sheets of the foam can be seen on many of the horse and camel saddles. The Bedouin nicknamed O'Toole Abu-'Isfanj (أبو إسفنج), meaning "Father of the Sponge". During the filming of the Aqaba scene, O'Toole was nearly killed when he fell from his camel, but it stood over him, preventing the extras' horses from trampling him. Coincidentally, a very similar mishap befell the real Lawrence at the Battle of Abu El Lissal in 1917.

Super Panavision technology was used to shoot the film, meaning that spherical lenses were used instead of anamorphic ones, and the image was exposed on a 65 mm negative, then printed onto a 70 mm positive to leave room for the soundtracks. Rapid cutting was more disturbing on the wide screen, so film makers had to apply longer and more fluid takes. Shooting such a wide ratio produced some unwanted effects during projection, such as a peculiar "flutter" effect, a blurring of certain parts of the image. To avoid the problem, the director often had to modify blocking, giving the actor a more diagonal movement, where the flutter was less likely to occur. Lean was asked whether he could handle CinemaScope: "If one had an eye for composition, there would be no problem." O'Toole did not share Lawrence's love of the desert and stated in an interview "I loathe it".

=== Music ===
The film score was composed by Maurice Jarre, little known at the time and selected only after both William Walton and Malcolm Arnold had proved unavailable. Jarre was given just six weeks to compose two hours of orchestral music for Lawrence. The score was performed by the London Philharmonic Orchestra. Sir Adrian Boult is listed as the conductor of the score in the film's credits, but he could not conduct most of the score, due in part to his failure to adapt to the intricate timings of each cue, and Jarre replaced him as the conductor. The score went on to garner Jarre his first Academy Award for Music Score—Substantially Original, and it is now considered one of the greatest scores of all time, ranking number three on the American Film Institute's top twenty-five film scores.

Producer Sam Spiegel wanted to create a score with two themes to show the 'Eastern' and British side for the film. It was intended for Soviet composer Aram Khachaturian to create one half and British composer Benjamin Britten to write the other.

Kenneth Alford's march The Voice of the Guns (1917) is prominently featured on the soundtrack.

A complete recording of the score was not released until 2010 when Tadlow Music produced a CD of the music, with Nic Raine conducting the City of Prague Philharmonic Orchestra from scores reconstructed by Leigh Phillips.

== Release ==
=== Theatrical run ===
The film premiered at the Odeon Leicester Square in London on 10 December 1962 and was released in the United States on 16 December 1962.

Jordan banned the film for what was felt to be a disrespectful portrayal of Arab culture. Egypt, Omar Sharif's home country, was the only Arab nation to give the film a wide release, where it became a success through the endorsement of President Gamal Abdel Nasser, who appreciated the film's depiction of Arab nationalism.

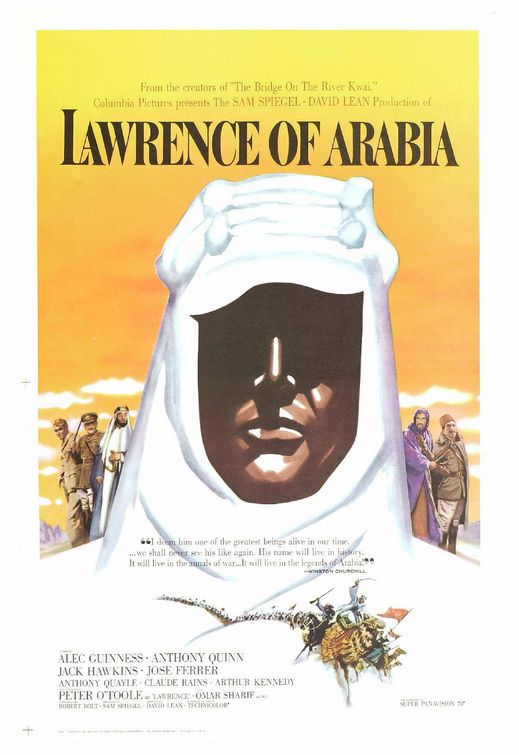
Theatrical poster from 1962 during the film's release

Lawrence of Arabia is slightly more than one minute longer than Gone With the Wind and is, therefore, the longest movie ever to win a Best Picture Oscar.

In January 1963, Lawrence of Arabia was released in a version edited by 20 minutes. In the United States, the film was released in five key cities—New York, Los Angeles, Philadelphia, Boston, and Miami Beach. By February 1963, the film expanded into six more reserved-seating engagements. From 9 October 1963 it started to open at 1,000 theatres in the United States on a non-reserved seat basis.

When it was re-released in 1971, an even shorter cut of 187 minutes was presented. The first round of cuts was made at the direction and even insistence of David Lean, to assuage criticisms of the film's length and increase the number of showings per day; however, during the 1989 restoration, he passed blame for the cuts onto deceased producer Sam Spiegel. In addition, a 1966 print was used for initial television and video releases which accidentally altered a few scenes by reversing the image.

The film was screened out of competition at the 1989 Cannes Film Festival and at the 2012 Karlovy Vary International Film Festival.

Lawrence of Arabia was re-released theatrically in 2002 to celebrate the film's fortieth anniversary.

=== Restored director's cut ===
A restored version was undertaken by Robert A. Harris and Jim Painten under the supervision of David Lean. It was released in 1989 with a 216-minute length (plus overture, intermission and exit music). Most of the cut scenes were dialogue sequences, particularly those involving General Allenby and his staff. Two scenes were excised —Brighton's briefing of Allenby in Jerusalem before the Deraa scene and the British staff meeting in the field tent—and the Allenby-briefing scene has still not been entirely restored. Much of the missing dialogue involves Lawrence's writing of poetry and verse, alluded to by Allenby in particular, saying "the last poetry general we had was Wellington". The opening of Act II existed in only fragmented form, where Faisal is interviewed by Bentley, as well as the later scene in Jerusalem where Allenby convinces Lawrence not to resign. Both scenes were restored to the 1989 re-release. Some of the more graphic shots of the Tafas massacre scene were also restored, such as the lengthy panning shot of the corpses in Tafas and Lawrence shooting a surrendering Turkish soldier.

Most of the missing footage is of minimal import, supplementing existing scenes. One scene is an extended version of the Deraa torture sequence, which makes Lawrence's torture more overt. Other scripted scenes exist, including a conversation between Auda and Lawrence immediately after the fall of Aqaba, a brief scene of Turkish officers noting the extent of Lawrence's campaign and the battle of Petra (later reworked into the first train attack) but these scenes were probably not filmed. Living actors dubbed their dialogue and Jack Hawkins's dialogue was dubbed by Charles Gray, who had provided Hawkins' voice for several films after Hawkins developed throat cancer in the late 1960s. Reasons for the cuts of various scenes can be found in Lean's notes to Sam Spiegel, Robert Bolt and Anne V. Coates. The film runs 227 minutes (216 minutes of proper film plus 11 minutes of overture, intermission, and exit music) in the most recent director's cut available on Blu-ray Disc and DVD.

=== Home media ===
The initial home video release of the film was in pan and scan and lacked the full vertical height. After the film was restored in 1989, The Criterion Collection issued Laserdisc editions in two speed formats, CAV (Constant Angular Velocity) and CLV (Constant Linear Velocity). RCA/Columbia Pictures also issued a movie-only widescreen release of this restoration on Laserdisc.

Lawrence of Arabia has been released in five different DVD editions, including an initial release as a two-disc set (2001), followed by a shorter single disc edition (2002), a high resolution version of the director's cut with restored scenes (2003) issued as part of the Superbit series, as part of the Columbia Best Pictures collection (2008), and in a fully restored special edition of the director's cut (2008).

Martin Scorsese and Steven Spielberg helped restore a version of the film for a DVD release in 2000.

=== New restoration, Blu-ray, and theatrical re-release ===
An 8K scan/4K intermediate digital restoration was made for Blu-ray and theatrical re-release during 2012 by Sony Pictures to celebrate the film's 50th anniversary. The Blu-ray edition of the film was released in the United Kingdom on 10 September 2012 and in the United States on 13 November 2012.

According to Grover Crisp, executive VP of restoration at Sony Pictures, the new 8K scan has such high resolution that it showed a series of fine concentric lines in a pattern "reminiscent of a fingerprint" near the top of the frame. This was caused by the film emulsion melting and cracking in the desert heat during production. Sony had to hire a third party to minimise or eliminate the rippling artefacts in the new restored version. The digital restoration was done by Sony Colorworks DI, Prasad Studios, and MTI Film.

A 4K digitally restored version of the film was screened at the 2012 Cannes Film Festival, at the 2012 Karlovy Vary International Film Festival, at the V Janela Internacional de Cinema in Recife, Brazil, and at the 2013 Cinequest Film & Creativity Festival in San Jose, California.

In 2020, Sony Pictures reissued the film on a multi-film 4K UHD Blu-Ray release called the Columbia Classics 4K UltraHD Collection, which included other historically significant films from their library such as Dr. Strangelove (1964) and Mr. Smith Goes to Washington (1939). In honour of the film's 60th anniversary, the film was re-released in an individual four-disc steelbook set by Sony Pictures, with the same substantial collection of special features as the corrected bonus disc for the Columbia Classics release.

== Reception ==
=== Box office ===
During its initial theatrical run, the film earned $15 million in box office rentals in the United States and Canada. In the United Kingdom, the film set a record by selling over 1 million tickets from 13 theatres in six months. The film went on to gross $70 million worldwide, including $37.5 million in North America and $32.5 million in other territories.

=== Critical reaction ===
Bosley Crowther of The New York Times called the film "vast, awe-inspiring, beautiful with ever-changing hues, exhausting and barren of humanity". He further wrote Lawrence's characterisation was lost within the spectacle, writing the film "reduces a legendary figure to conventional movie-hero size amidst magnificent and exotic scenery but a conventional lot of action-film cliches". Similarly, Variety wrote that the film was "a sweepingly produced, directed and lensed job. Authentic desert locations, a stellar cast and an intriguing subject combine to put this into the blockbuster league." However, it later noted Bolt's screenplay "does not tell the audience anything much new about Lawrence of Arabia nor does it offer any opinion or theory about the character of this man or the motivation for his actions". Philip K. Scheuer of the Los Angeles Times wrote, "It is also one of the most magnificent pictures, if not the most magnificent, and one of the most exasperating ... The awesome majesty of the landscapes in Jordan and elsewhere, the mass movements of Bedouins and British and Turks with, of course, the ever-present camels, sweep against the eye long after one has lost the ability to exclaim in astonishment over them. And all this is Technicolor and Super Panavision 70, the finest process, under F. A. Young as director of photography. Maurice Jarre composed a score to match."

A review in Time magazine felt that while Lawrence of Arabia "falls far short of Kwai in dramatic impact, it nevertheless presents a vivid and intelligent spectacle". It further praised O'Toole's performance, writing he "continually dominates the screen, and he dominates it with professional skill, Irish charm and smashing good looks". Chicago Tribune wrote the photography was "no less than superb" and felt the script "is taut and expressive and the musical score deftly attuned to the tale. Director David Lean has molded his massive material with skill, but personally I felt the film was too long, the running time is 221 minutes, or 20 minutes short of 4 hours and in the latter part, unnecessarily bloody." A review in Newsweek praised the film as "an admirably serious film ... The size, the scope, the fantastical scale of his personality and his achievement is triumphantly there." It also praised the ensemble cast as "all as good as they ought to be. And Peter O'Toole is not only good; he is an unnerving look-alike of the real Lawrence. He is reliably unreliable, steadily mercurial."

In 1998, the American Film Institute (AFI) ranked Lawrence of Arabia in fifth place in their list of 100 Years...100 Movies. In 2006, AFI ranked the film #30 on its list of most inspiring movies. In 2007, it was ranked in seventh place in their updated list and listed as the first of the greatest American films of the "epic" genre. In 1991, the film was deemed "culturally, historically, or aesthetically significant" by the Library of Congress and selected for preservation in the United States National Film Registry. In 1999, the film placed third in the British Film Institute's poll of the best British films of the 20th century. In 2001, the magazine Total Film called it "as shockingly beautiful and hugely intelligent as any film ever made" and that despite "the odd historical liberty here and there", "as a movie - - not a textbook - - it's faultless."

It was ranked in the top ten films of all time in the 2002 Sight and Sound directors' poll. In 2004, it was voted the best British film of all time by over 200 respondents in The Sunday Telegraph poll of Britain's leading filmmakers. O'Toole's performance is often considered one of the greatest in cinema history, topping lists from Entertainment Weekly and Première. T. E. Lawrence, portrayed by O'Toole, was selected as the tenth-greatest hero in cinema history by the American Film Institute. In 2006, Writers Guild of America ranked its screenplay 14th in WGA's list of 101 Greatest Screenplays. In 2012, the Motion Picture Editors Guild listed the film as the seventh best-edited of all time based on a survey of its membership. In March 2024, Robbie Collin of The Telegraph ranked Lawrence of Arabia as the greatest biographical film of all time.

Lawrence of Arabia is currently one of the highest-rated films on Metacritic; it holds a perfect 100 rating based on eight reviews for the 40th anniversary re-release. It has a 93% approval rating on Rotten Tomatoes based on 132 reviews, with an average rating of 9.30/10. Its critical consensus reads, "The epic of all epics, Lawrence of Arabia cements director David Lean's status in the film-making pantheon with nearly four hours of grand scope, brilliant performances, and beautiful cinematography."

The Japanese filmmaker Akira Kurosawa cited this movie as one of his 100 favourite films.

== Awards ==
Award	Category	Nominee(s)	Result	Ref.
Academy Awards	Best Picture	Sam Spiegel	Won	
Academy Awards	Best Director	David Lean	Won	
Academy Awards	Best Actor	Peter O'Toole	Nominated	
Academy Awards	Best Supporting Actor	Omar Sharif	Nominated	
Academy Awards	Best Adapted Screenplay	Robert Bolt and Michael Wilson	Nominated	
Academy Awards	Best Art Direction – Color	Art Direction: John Box and John Stoll; Set Decoration: Dario Simoni	Won	
Academy Awards	Best Cinematography – Color	Freddie Young	Won	
Academy Awards	Best Film Editing	Anne V. Coates	Won	
Academy Awards	Best Music Score – Substantially Original	Maurice Jarre	Won	
Academy Awards	Best Sound	John Cox	Won	
American Cinema Editors Awards	Best Edited Feature Film	Anne V. Coates	Nominated	
British Academy Film Awards	Best Film from any Source		Won	
British Academy Film Awards	Best British Film		Won	
British Academy Film Awards	Best British Actor	Peter O'Toole	Won	
British Academy Film Awards	Best Foreign Actor	Anthony Quinn	Nominated	
British Academy Film Awards	Best British Screenplay	Robert Bolt	Won	
British Society of Cinematographers Awards	Best Cinematography in a Theatrical Feature Film	Freddie Young	Won	
David di Donatello Awards	Best Foreign Production	Sam Spiegel	Won	
David di Donatello Awards	Best Foreign Actor	Peter O'Toole	Won (Note: Tied with Fredric March for Seven Days in May.)	
Directors Guild of America Awards	Outstanding Directorial Achievement in Motion Pictures	David Lean	Won	
Golden Globe Awards	Best Motion Picture – Drama		Won	
Golden Globe Awards	Best Actor in a Motion Picture – Drama	Peter O'Toole	Nominated	
Golden Globe Awards	Best Actor in a Motion Picture – Drama	Anthony Quinn	Nominated	
Golden Globe Awards	Best Supporting Actor – Motion Picture	Omar Sharif	Won	
Golden Globe Awards	Best Director – Motion Picture	David Lean	Won	
Golden Globe Awards	Most Promising Newcomer – Male	Peter O'Toole	Won	
Golden Globe Awards	Most Promising Newcomer – Male	Omar Sharif	Won	
Golden Globe Awards	Best Cinematography – Color	Freddie Young	Won	
Grammy Awards	Best Original Score from a Motion Picture or Television Show	Lawrence of Arabia – Maurice Jarre	Nominated	
Grammy Awards	Best Instrumental Theme	Lawrence of Arabia – Maurice Jarre	Nominated	
International Film Music Critics Association Awards	Best Archival Release of an Existing Score	Maurice Jarre, Nic Raine, Jim Fitzpatrick, and Frank K. DeWald	Nominated	
Kinema Junpo Awards	Best Foreign Language Film	David Lean	Won	
Laurel Awards	Top Road Show		Won	
Laurel Awards	Top Male Dramatic Performance	Peter O'Toole	Nominated	
Laurel Awards	Top Male Supporting Performance	Omar Sharif	Nominated	
Laurel Awards	Top Song	Maurice Jarre (for the "Theme Song")	Nominated	
Nastro d'Argento	Best Foreign Director	David Lean	Won	
National Board of Review Awards	Top Ten Films		4th Place	
National Board of Review Awards	Best Director	David Lean	Won	
National Film Preservation Board	National Film Registry		Inducted	
Online Film & Television Association Awards	Film Hall of Fame: Productions		Inducted	
Producers Guild of America Awards	PGA Hall of Fame – Motion Pictures	Sam Spiegel	Won	
Saturn Awards	Best DVD or Blu-ray Special Edition Release	Lawrence of Arabia: 50th Anniversary Collector's Edition	Nominated	
Writers' Guild of Great Britain Awards	Best British Dramatic Screenplay	Robert Bolt and Michael Wilson	Won	

== Legacy ==
Its visual style has influenced many directors, including George Lucas, Sam Peckinpah, Stanley Kubrick, Martin Scorsese, Ridley Scott, Brian De Palma, Oliver Stone, Denis Villeneuve, and Steven Spielberg, who called the film a "miracle". Spielberg further considered it his favourite film of all time and the one that inspired him to become a filmmaker, crediting the film, which he saw four times in four successive weeks upon its release, with understanding "It was the first time seeing a movie, I realized there are themes that aren't narrative story themes, there are themes that are character themes, that are personal themes. [...] and I realized there was no going back. It was what I was going to do."

Film director Kathryn Bigelow also considers it one of her favourite films, saying it inspired her to film The Hurt Locker in Jordan. Lawrence of Arabia also inspired numerous other adventure, science fiction and fantasy stories in modern popular culture, including Frank Herbert's Dune franchise, George Lucas's Star Wars franchise, James Cameron's Avatar franchise, Ridley Scott's Prometheus (2012), and George Miller's Mad Max: Fury Road (2015). Director Denis Villeneuve has called Lawrence a "perfect movie", strongly influencing his Dune trilogy.

== Later film ==
In 1990, the made-for-television film A Dangerous Man: Lawrence After Arabia was aired. It depicts events in the lives of Lawrence and Faisal subsequent to Lawrence of Arabia and featured Ralph Fiennes as Lawrence and Alexander Siddig as Prince Faisal.

== See also ==
- BFI Top 100 British films
- List of films considered the best

== Sources ==
- Brownlow, Kevin (1996). David Lean: A Biography. Richard Cohen Books. ISBN 978-1-86066-042-9.
- Caton, Steven Charles (1999). Lawrence of Arabia: a film's anthropology. Berkeley: University of California Press. doi:10.1525/california/9780520210820.003.0007. ISBN 978-0-520-91989-1.
- Jackson, Kevin (2007). Lawrence of Arabia (BFI Film Classics). British Film Institute. ISBN 978-1-84457-178-9.
- Morris, L. Robert; Raskin, Lawrence (1992). Lawrence of Arabia: The 30th Anniversary Pictorial History. New York: Anchor Books. ISBN 978-0-385-42479-0.
- Murphy, David (2008). The Arab Revolt: 1916–1918. London: Osprey Publishing. ISBN 978-1-84603-339-1.
- Phillips, Gene D. (2006). Beyond the Epic: The Life and Films of David Lean. Lexington: University Press of Kentucky. ISBN 978-0-8131-2415-5.
- Turner, Adrian (1994). The Making of David Lean's Lawrence of Arabia. Dragon's World Ltd. ISBN 978-1-85028-211-2.
