= The Reward (1965 film) =

1965 film by Serge Bourguignon

- Directed by: Serge Bourguignon
- Screenplay by: Serge Bourguignon; Oscar Millard
- Based on: The Reward; 1955 novel by Michael Barrett
- Produced by: Aaron Rosenberg
- Starring: Max von Sydow; Yvette Mimieux; Efrem Zimbalist Jr. Gilbert Roland
- Cinematography: Joseph MacDonald
- Edited by: Robert L. Simpson
- Music by: Elmer Bernstein
- Production company: Arcola Pictures
- Distributed by: 20th Century Fox
- Release date: September 15, 1965
- Running time: 91 minutes
- Country: United States
- Language: English

The Reward is a 1965 American Western film directed by Serge Bourguignon and starring Max von Sydow, Yvette Mimieux, Efrem Zimbalist Jr. and Gilbert Roland. based on a novel by Michael Barrett.

== Plot ==
El Paso crop duster Scott Svenson accidentally flies his plane into a shallow pipe hidden just below the dirt landing area across the Mexican border. The disturbed pipe causes a water tower to collapse. By chance he spots a friend, Frank Bryant, in a car with a woman.

Svenson then notices Bryant's face on a $50,000 reward poster. Since he must pay for the damage to the tower, Svenson offers to assist a local law enforcement official, Capt. Carbajal, in tracking down and capturing Bryant, whereupon they would split the reward.

A posse is formed that includes Sgt. Lopez and two other men, Joaquin and young Luis, who dreams of becoming a bullfighter. Bryant and the woman, Sylvia, are tracked down, but Lopez—learning of the reward shortly after Bryant's apprehension—now wants a percentage of the reward for his efforts. And as soon as Joaquin makes a decision to help Bryant and the woman escape, Lopez kills both Bryant and Joaquin.

Luis tries to round up the posse's remaining horses, but dies in the attempt. Carbajal then is stricken with malaria and turns seriously ill. There is little left to do for Svenson and the woman except try to get back to town safely on foot.

== Cast ==
- Max von Sydow as Svenson Swenson
- Yvette Mimieux as Sylvia
- Efrem Zimbalist, Jr. as Frank Bryant
- Gilbert Roland as Captain Carbajal
- Emilio Fernández as Sergeant Lopez (credited as Emilio Fermandez)
- Nino Castelnuovo as Luis
- Henry Silva as Joaquin
- Rodolfo Acosta as Patron
- Julian Rivero as "El Viejo"

== Production ==
The film was made for $2,685,000.

== Reception ==
Variety wrote:

The reward for a fugitive and its effects on a group thrown together by fate comprise the theme of this moody, somewhat uneven, desert meller. Some good acting and excellent production values bolster a plot that fizzes out in final reel.

At SixtiesCinema.com, Tom Lisanti wrote:

The ending fails to provide a satisfying wrap-up, leaving the survivors still lost in the desert. Needless to say, the film was reviled by the critics and bombed at the box office. Despite (Yvette) Mimieux's high hopes for the picture, it did nothing for her career. In fact, the critic from The New Yorker called her "the poor man's Carol Lynley." Ouch!

According to Fox records, the film needed to earn $4,400,000 in rentals to break even and only made $1,615,000.

== See also ==
- List of American films of 1965
