= Arab National Council =

1920s alliance of Arabian tribes

The Arab National Council was an alliance of once warring Arabian tribes formed after the victorious uprising against nearly 400 years of Ottoman rule over Syria. T. E. Lawrence was instrumental in establishing this provisional Arab government under King Faisal. Faisal's rule as king, however, came to an abrupt end in 1920, after the battle of Maysaloun, when the French Forces of General Gouraud, under the command of General Mariano Goybet, entered Damascus, destroying Lawrence's dream of being lauded for laying the foundations of an independent Arabian rule over Syria. The council disbanded in the 1930s.

== See also ==
- Arab Kingdom of Syria
- Arab League
- Arab nationalism
- Arab Revolt
- Lawrence of Arabia (film)
- Sykes–Picot Agreement
