= Two Weeks in September =

1967 British-French film by Serge Bourguignon

- Directed by: Serge Bourguignon
- Written by: Vahé Katcha; Pascal Jardin; Serge Bourguignon; Sean Graham (English adpt)
- Produced by: Francis Cosne; Kenneth Harper
- Starring: Brigitte Bardot; Laurent Terzieff; Jean Rochefort; James Robertson Justice; Georgina Ward
- Cinematography: Edmond Séchan
- Edited by: Jean Ravel
- Music by: Michel Magne
- Production companies: Films du Quadrangle; Francos Films; Kenwood Films; Les Films Pomereu
- Distributed by: Rank Film Distributors
- Release dates: 7 June 1967 (France); 26 October 1967 (UK)
- Running time: 95 minutes
- Countries: France; United Kingdom
- Languages: French; English
- Budget: 7 million francs
- Box office: 691,609 admissions (France)

Two Weeks in September (French title: À coeur joie; also known as Joy-hearted) is a 1967 British-French drama film directed by Serge Bourguignon and starring Brigitte Bardot, Laurent Terzieff, Jean Rochefort and James Robertson Justice.

== Plot ==
Model Cecile spends two weeks away from her older lover Philippe and is tempted by a younger man.

== Cast ==
- Brigitte Bardot as Cécile
- Laurent Terzieff as Vincent
- Jean Rochefort as Philippe
- James Robertson Justice as McClintock
- Mike Sarne as Dickinson
- Georgina Ward as Patricia
- Carole Lebel as Monique
- Annie Nicolas as Chantal
- Murray Head as Dickinson's assistant

== Production ==
The film was the sixth in a series of movies financed jointly by the Rank Organization and the NFFC. British companies provided 30% of the budget; French companies provided 70%. It was shot at the Billancourt Studios in Paris and on location around London. Scenes for the film were also shot on the beach at Tyninghame in East Lothian in September 1966. The principal cast stayed at the Open Arms in Dirleton.

== Soundtrack ==
The soundtrack features two songs in English, "Do You Want to Marry Me?" and "I Must Tell You Why", with music by Michel Magne and vocals sung by David Gilmour, working as a session musician with his band Jokers Wild, before he joined Pink Floyd.

== Reception ==
=== Critical ===
The Monthly Film Bulletin wrote: "Supremely ludicrous amalgam of all the clichés of women's magazine fiction, flashily photographed, and directed by Serge Bourguignon at a snail's pace and in a style that fully matches the inanities of the plot. The dialogue (rendered in Franglais) produces some of the best unconsciously funny lines for a long time, none better perhaps than kilted Scottish laird James Robertson Justices embarrassed explanation to the young lovers in his ruined castle that his tape-recorder is only supposed to be set off by a certain frequency emitted by birds – "And it would appear, madam, that you made exactly the same noise." There's a fashion photographer who tells his models to "hate me a little", a photographic session amid the pink deckchairs of a London park, and a whole succession of close-ups of Bardot in various stages of undress, including one of her in a bubble bath opining that "happiness is just drops of water". It might almost be a parody. But a film which signals a passionate love scene on a bed of straw in a ruined castle by a cut to waves pounding on a beach is obviously in deadly earnest."

"Two hours wasted" said the Los Angeles Times. Filmink praised "the star power of Bardot" but added "it's not one of her better movies."

The film received very poor reviews overall.

=== Box office ===
The film was a box office disappointment.

== Notes ==
- Petrie, Duncan James (2016). "Resisting Hollywood Dominance in Sixties British Cinema : The NFFC/Rank Joint Financing Initiative" (PDF). Historical Journal of Film, Radio and Television.
