= National Board of Review Awards 1962 =

Annual film awards

34th National Board of Review Awards

December 21, 1962

The 34th National Board of Review Awards were announced on December 21, 1962.

== Top ten films ==
1. The Longest Day
2. Billy Budd
3. The Miracle Worker
4. Lawrence of Arabia
5. Long Day's Journey into Night
6. Whistle Down the Wind
7. Requiem for a Heavyweight
8. A Taste of Honey
9. Birdman of Alcatraz
10. War Hunt

== Top foreign films ==
1. Sundays and Cybele
2. Barabbas
3. Divorce, Italian Style
4. The Naked Island
5. Through a Glass Darkly

== Winners ==
- Best Film: The Longest Day
- Best Foreign Film: Sundays and Cybele
- Best Actor: Jason Robards (Long Day's Journey Into Night, Tender is the Night)
- Best Actress: Anne Bancroft (The Miracle Worker)
- Best Supporting Actor: Burgess Meredith (Advise and Consent)
- Best Supporting Actress: Angela Lansbury (The Manchurian Candidate, All Fall Down)
- Best Director: David Lean (Lawrence of Arabia)
