= The Great Little Army =

British military march

- March by Kenneth J. Alford
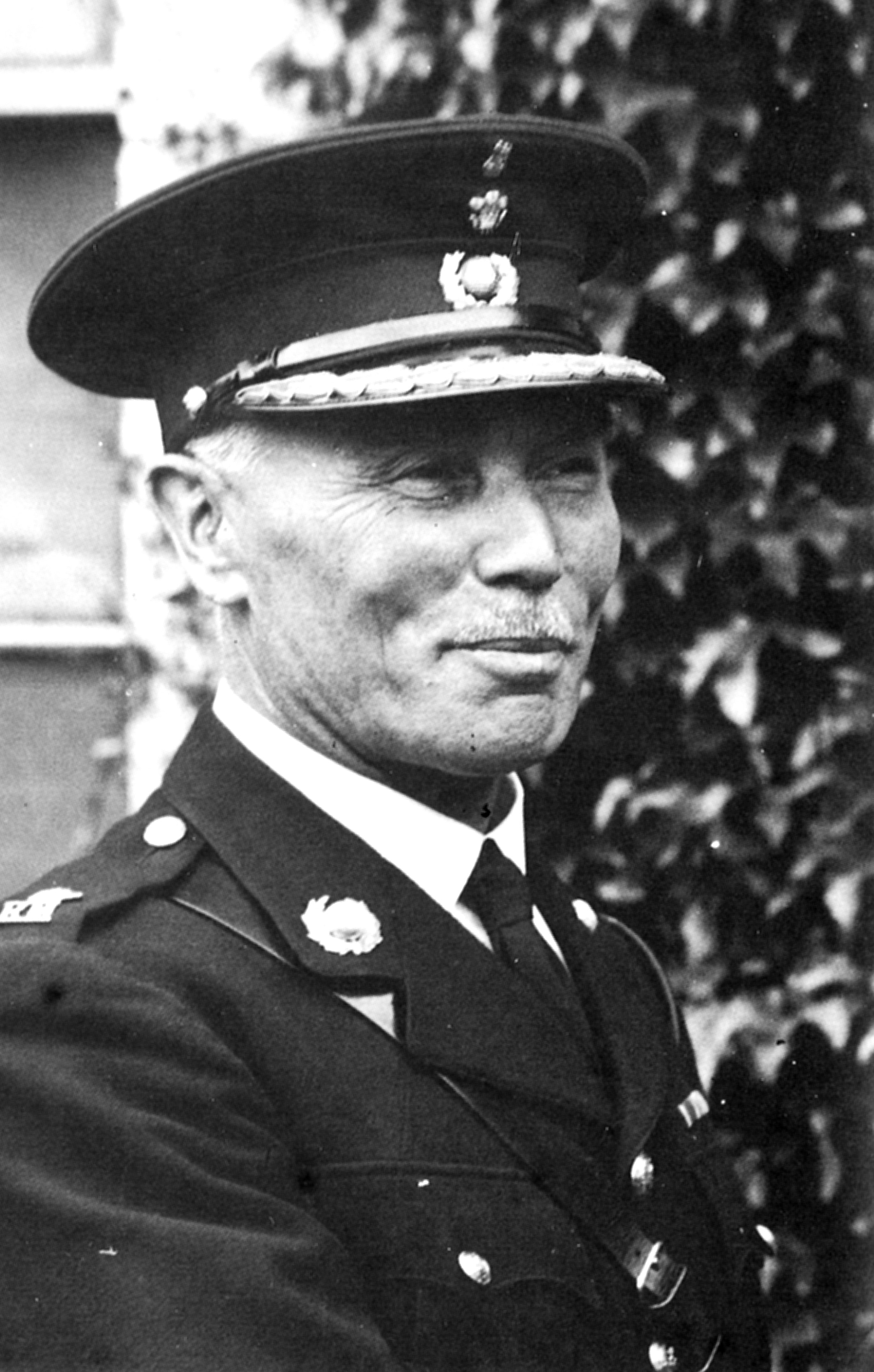
- Kenneth J. Alford
- Composed: 1916

"The Great Little Army" is a British military march that was composed by Kenneth J. Alford in 1916. Alford (real name Frederick Joseph Ricketts) was a bandmaster of the British Army/Royal Marines, who in the last position he was appointed to directed the Band of HM Royal Marines, Plymouth. It was written to honour British and Allied victories won on the Western Front. The title relates to the Kaiser supposedly referring to the British army as 'a contemptible little army'. The phrase was actually devised at the British War Office by Sir Frederick Maurice to be attributed to the Kaiser as propaganda.

The march is currently employed by various units in the British Army as a march past. The Canadian Army made the march the authorised march-past in quick time in 2013, replacing "Celer Paratus Callidus" ("Quick, Clever and Ready"). Colleen McGrann, spokeswoman for the Canadian Army explained that "Celer Paratus Callidus" was "neither particularly tuneful or easily recognizable" and that "The Great Little Army" "seemed appropriate in both name and tune".

The march is also the regimental quick march for the 2nd Battalion, Royal New Zealand Infantry Regiment and the Special Mobile Force of Mauritius.
