= The Picasso Summer =

1969 Hollywood drama film

- Directed by: Serge Bourguignon; Robert Sallin
- Written by: Ray Bradbury (alt Douglas Spaulding); Edwin Boyd
- Produced by: Bruce Campbell; Wes Herschensohn
- Starring: Albert Finney; Yvette Mimieux; Luis Miguel Dominguín
- Cinematography: Vilmos Zsigmond
- Edited by: William Paul Dornisch
- Music by: Michel Legrand
- Distributed by: Warner Bros.-Seven Arts
- Release date: August 8, 1969
- Running time: 90 minutes
- Country: United States
- Language: English
- Budget: $1.5 million

The Picasso Summer is a 1969 drama starring Albert Finney and Yvette Mimieux. The screenplay was written by Ray Bradbury (using the pseudonym of Douglas Spaulding) based upon his 1957 short story "In a Season of Calm Weather."

The original director was Serge Bourguignon, whose rough cut was rejected by Warner Bros. Pictures. Another director, Robert Sallin, was hired to reshoot some scenes and the changed ending. Even with the reworked scenes, the film was never released to theaters in the United States. It was sold for distribution to television networks and stations with Sallin receiving credit as the director.

Future Academy Award winner Vilmos Zsigmond was the cinematographer.

== Plot ==
George Smith is a bored young San Francisco architect who is depressed after finishing a project to which he felt that his contribution was of little consequence. After George and his wife Alice attend a vacuous party, George reassesses his life. He admires Pablo Picasso, an artist who pursues his dreams with abandon. George suddenly feels an overwhelming urge to meet Picasso and takes Alice along on a sudden trip to France. They arrive in the south of France and arrive at the gate of his villa only to be told that Picasso does not see visitors.

After a dismal dinner, George retreats to a bar while Alice returns to the hotel. The next morning, George returns with a Frenchman whom he has befriended, and they are both inebriated. However, George's obsessive quest has begun to bother Alice. She refuses to accompany him to Spain to find a famous matador friend of Picasso who may be able to arrange an introduction. George has an adventure in Spain with the matador while Alice wanders about the French town alone. She meets a blind painter and his wife, who invite her home for dinner and give her one of his paintings.

George returns, thoroughly disappointed that his great quest has come to nothing. He apologizes to Alice for taking her on such a miserable vacation. They take one last swim at the beach before walking off into the sunset, failing to notice Picasso, who is at the same beach with his family and standing a few hundred yards away, drawing fantastic figures in the sand.

== Cast ==
- Albert Finney as George Smith
- Yvette Mimieux as Alice Smith
- Luis Miguel Dominguín as himself (the bullfighter)
- Theo Marcuse as The Host
- Jim Connell as The Artist
- Sopwith Camel as The Band at the Party
- Peter Madden as Blind Man
- Tutte Lemkow as Drunk
- Graham Stark as Postman
- Marty Ingels as man at Party
- Bee Duffell as German Tourist

== Music ==
The score was composed by Michel Legrand, and features the theme "Summer Me, Winter Me". It appears in its instrumental form on the soundtrack album (coupled with Legrand's music for Summer of '42). However, in its vocal setting, with words by Alan and Marilyn Bergman, it has been recorded by many artists, including Barbra Streisand, Sarah Vaughan, Frank Sinatra, Johnny Mathis, Kiri Te Kanawa, and Morgana King.

== See also ==
- List of American films of 1969
