= Patricia Gozzi =

French actress (born 1950)

- Born: 12 April 1950 (age 76); Paris, France
- Occupation: Actress

Patricia Gozzi (born 12 April 1950) is a French actress. She is best known for her starring roles in Sundays and Cybèle and Rapture.

Hung Up was Gozzi's final film.

== Filmography ==
Year	Title	Role	Notes
1960	Recourse in Grace	Denise	
1961	Quai Notre-Dame	Fortunée	
1961	Léon Morin, Priest	France	
1962	Sundays and Cybele	Françoise / Cybèle	
1965	Rapture	Agnes Larbaud	
1970	A Hostage	Teresa	TV movie
1973	Hung Up	Dina	
