= Kenneth J. Alford =

English composer (1881–1945)

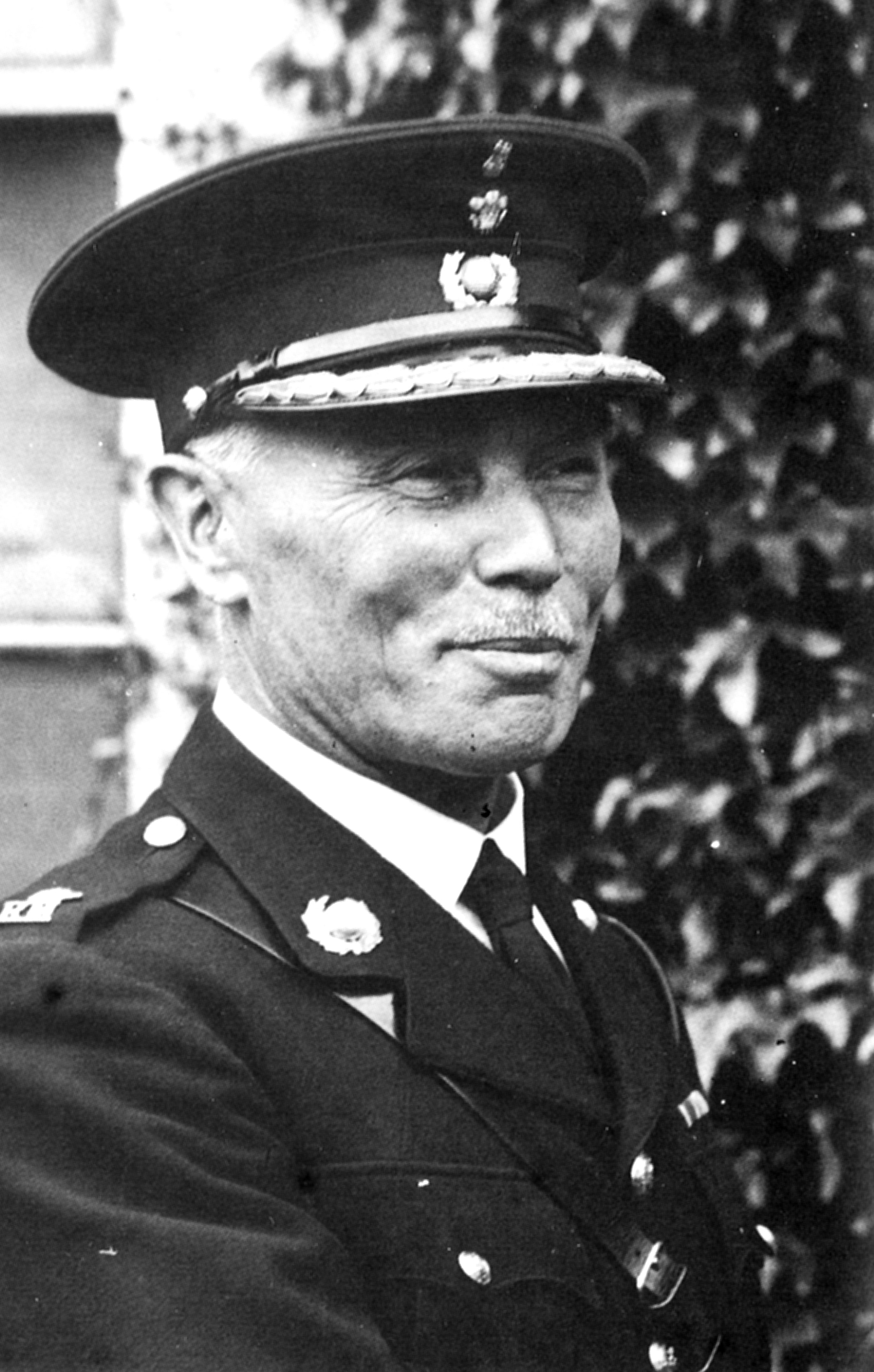
- Born: Frederick Joseph Ricketts; 21 February 1881; Ratcliff, London, England
- Died: 15 May 1945 (aged 64); Reigate, Surrey, England
- Occupations: Bandmaster, composer, arranger
- Known for: British March King
- Spouse: Annie Louisa Holmes (m. 1907)
- Children: 6
- Military career
- Allegiance: United Kingdom
- Branch: British Army (until 1927); Royal Navy; Royal Marines
- Service years: 1895–1944
- Unit: Royal Irish Regiment

Frederick Joseph Ricketts (21 February 1881 – 15 May 1945) was an English composer of marches for band. Under the pen name Kenneth J. Alford, he composed marches which are considered to be great examples of the art. He was a bandmaster in the British Army, and Royal Marines director of music. Conductor Vivian Dunn called him "The British March King". Alford's frequent use of the saxophone contributed to its permanent inclusion in military bands. His best known work is the "Colonel Bogey March".

== Early life and education ==
Ricketts was born on 21 February 1881, the fourth child of Robert and Louisa (née Alford) Ricketts in the Thameside hamlet of Ratcliff, within the parish of Shadwell in London's East End. Born within the sound of Bow Bells (the Church of St. Mary-le-Bow in Cheapside), Ricketts had Cockney birthright. His London ancestry can be traced back to the early 18th century: his father was a coal merchant in Ratcliff on the north side of the Thames near Limehouse. On 9 December 1884, a fifth child, Randolph Robjent, was born to the Ricketts family, who, like his elder brother, was to become well known in military musical circles, under the pseudonym Leo Stanley. Ricketts's father died when he was seven and his mother when he was fourteen.

His early musical training had been on playing the piano and organ and working as a church chorister in the parish church of St. Paul's, which still stands today. As a boy living in London's East End he would often hear street musicians and bands, including German bands and early Salvation Army bands. Fascinated by the sound of instruments, the orphaned Ricketts determined that the best course for his future would be to join an army band.

== Enlistment ==
Ricketts joined the Royal Irish Regiment in 1895. He was enlisted as a Band Boy. It is generally believed that he lied about his age in order to be accepted, giving 5 March 1880 as the date of his birth. In 1895, Ricketts' true age would have been 14, certainly from 21 February. After the 1876 investigation into the status of Boy Soldiers, the Army's regulations had become more clearly defined. Boys were enlisted from the age of fourteen as musicians, drummers, tailors, shoemakers, artificers, or clerks. It would hardly seem necessary for Ricketts to have added a year to his age but throughout his military service, the adopted date was listed as his birth date. Well-liked, ambitious, and a good student with natural ability, he was proficient enough on cornet within very few months and taken into the regimental band. The band went on postings with the regiment, first to Limerick in Ireland, then to India.

Ricketts used every spare moment to learn to play all the instruments in the band. He was very popular with the regular soldiers because of his piano-playing ability in the various messes, as he was promoted. His first composition at the age of 15 was "For Service Overseas", which has never been published. As he concluded seven years of man-service, in 1903, the Colonel Commanding the Royal Irish Regiment, and his bandmaster, Mr. J. Phillips, recommended Ricketts for entry into the Student Bandmaster Course at the Royal Military School of Music, (Kneller Hall) in Twickenham, Middlesex. As it was then unusual for a 23-year-old musician to be nominated for Kneller Hall, it is believed that this is proof of his skill.

== Royal Military School of Music ==
Ricketts' two-year course at Kneller Hall began in the summer of 1904. Studies there were rigorous: the first year consisted of a firm grounding in harmony, counterpoint, instrumentation, aural training, composition and arranging, carried out by a graduated senior student. Along with these studies, Student Bandmasters were required to learn the basics and pass playing tests on the five woodwind and five brass instruments normally found in the military band. Moreover, there were various band practices, public summer concerts, plus strict military discipline. The teachers in year two were highly qualified professors in each field, often from the Royal College of Music, or working professionals. This year culminated by sitting competitions in arranging, composition (concert band and brass band), conducting, and church service (conducting and composing organ preludes and psalms). All graduate Student Bandmasters then waited for their "tips" –- their appointments as Warrant Officer Class 1 Bandmasters to one of the line bands. Normally, those who placed highest in the examinations were the first to be appointed, but if there was a top line band which would lose its present bandmaster in several months' time or even a year, then the Director of Music might hold back the graduate who he felt should have that band. Ricketts excelled at Kneller Hall, but did not win the March Competition. The student who did was W.V. Richards with a March titled Namur, the name of a battle honour of the Royal Irish Regiment (Richards was from the Royal Irish Regiment), published in 1908.

Graduating in 1906, so highly was he regarded that Ricketts stayed on at Kneller Hall as chapel organist and assistant to the Director of Music, Lieutenant (later Lieutenant Colonel) Arthur Stretton, for two years. Though the post of School Bandmaster was not initiated until 1949, Ricketts may well have acted in a similar capacity during those two years. In 1929, Kneller Hall introduced an advanced certificate for already qualified bandmasters (though they had to sit another stringent set of exams to obtain it), but it was retroactively awarded to those who were deemed to have previously demonstrated achievement of the higher standard, or had been commissioned prior to 1929. Ricketts was one of those to receive the award, allowing him to use the letters "psm" (pass, school of music) after his name as a military qualification. (It was widely felt among British Bandmasters that the psm exam was also a screen by which those who did not fit the mould for becoming commissioned Directors of Music could be discretely failed on a subject, making them ineligible.)

Ricketts' younger brother, Randolph, attended the one-year pupil's course at Kneller Hall, for advanced training on his instrument, and entered the Student Bandmaster course in 1900. He graduated in 1913 and became bandmaster of the 2nd Battalion, Essex Regiment, where he served until 1925. In 1926, he moved to the Band of the Royal Corps of Signals, remaining with this group until his retirement in 1938. He composed marches and other band music under the pen name Leo R. Stanley.

== Bandmaster ==
Colonel Bogey March
In 1914, Alford composed "Colonel Bogey March", which is the authorized march of The King's Own Calgary Regiment (RCAC) of the Canadian Forces. This version is performed by the United States Navy Band.

In 1908, Ricketts was finally given his own band. He was posted as bandmaster to the Band of the 2nd Battalion of the Argyll and Sutherland Highlanders, joining them in the Orange River Colony (formerly the Orange Free State) in what is now the Republic of South Africa. The colonel asked him to write a new regimental march for the Argylls, and he responded with "The Thin Red Line", based on two bars of the regiment's bugle call. The title and term originated in a journalist's description (a "thin red streak tipped with a line of steel") of the appearance of the red-coated Argylls (under their alternate name of the 93rd Highland Regiment) as they stood before – and repelled – a vastly superior force of Russian cavalry at the Battle of Balaclava during the Crimean War. This march was not published for general use until 1925.

Ricketts had a desire to compose music. The problem was that it was frowned upon for commissioned officers and warrant officers class 1 to be engaged in commercial activities in the civilian world. The answer for Ricketts was to compose and publish under a pen name. The pseudonym Kenneth J. Alford was constructed from his eldest son's name (Kenneth), his own middle name (Joseph) and his mother's maiden name (Alford). The first march written under the new pen name was "Holyrood". In July 1911, the 2nd Battalion and Band of the Argylls were in Edinburgh, performing guard duties at the Palace of Holyroodhouse (the Edinburgh residence of the Monarch) during the coronation-year visit to the Scottish capital of King George V and Queen Mary. Moved to commemorate the occasion, Ricketts sketched the march on the back of an envelope during one of the interminable waits these duties entail. It was published in 1912 by Hawkes and Son of London, the first to bear the Alford sobriquet.

== First World War ==
A few weeks before the start of World War I, the 2nd Battalion of the Argylls and the Band were stationed at Fort George in north-east Scotland, nine miles from Inverness. It was here that Ricketts composed his most famous march, "Colonel Bogey". While there are several speculations of how the march was begun, the most accepted is probably from a note written by Ricketts' widow to the publishers in 1958.

"While playing golf on the Fort George course, one of the members whistled the first two notes (B flat and G) instead of calling 'Fore!', and with impish spontaneity was answered by my husband with the next few notes. There was little sauntering—Moray Firth's stiff breezes encouraged a good crisp stride. These little scraps of whistling appeared to 'catch on' with the golfers, and from that beginning the Quick March was built up". Was the original whistler the colonel? We'll probably never know for certain, but the title Colonel Bogey gives us a clue.

Shortly after hostilities began in August, the adult musicians of most line bands were pressed into service as stretcher bearers and medical orderlies. Ricketts and the Band Boys of the Argylls were posted to the 3rd Battalion (Reserve) in Edinburgh for the duration. During the war Ricketts wrote several marches dedicated to the fighting forces: "The Great Little Army" (1916), "On The Quarter Deck", "The Middy", and "The Voice of the Guns" (1917), and "The Vanished Army" (1919) which was subtitled "They Never Die". By the end of the war the Band Boys had matured into a group considered by many to be the finest regimental band in the British Army. Ricketts was given the unusual honour of being Mentioned in Despatches for Commendable Service.

The 1920s were perhaps the high point for the 2nd Battalion Band. Under Ricketts, they had become a popular fixture in London parks, seaside holiday resorts and everywhere else they performed. In 1925 the Band undertook a six-month tour to New Zealand, where it was the resident band for the New Zealand and South Seas Exhibition. It was there that Ricketts wrote "Dunedin" (published 1928), and returning to the United Kingdom aboard the New Zealand Shipping Company's S.S. Remuera via the Panama Canal, Ricketts was moved to compose the march "Old Panama" (published 1929). Such was his popularity with the public that when in 1927 Bandmaster Ricketts handed the baton over to his successor, Charles Smart Beat, 15,000 people turned up to wish him well. (Charles Beat was the father of Lieutenant Colonel Duncan Beat, Director of Music of the Scots Guards Band, 1974–1982, and later Director of Music at Kneller Hall, 1982–1988.)

== From Army to Navy ==
In 1921, Ricketts' mentor at Kneller Hall, Lieutenant Colonel Arthur Stretton, announced his retirement from the army and as Director of Music at KH. Since Ricketts had sufficient years of service that he could have retired, he was also free to accept any musical appointments, either civilian or military, that were offered. Both Colonel Stretton and senior army officials, impressed by Ricketts' service record and compositions, felt that he was the best candidate to succeed Stretton, and he was invited to apply for the position. For reasons best known to himself, Ricketts declined.

A possibly contributing factor has emerged: it would seem that Ricketts had held a desire for some time to conduct a band in the Royal Marines, though he held this in confidence. Consequently, in the same year, 1921, when the Royal Marines announced a vacancy for bandmastership of the Band of the Plymouth Division, Ricketts applied, turning down the Kneller Hall application. He was interviewed, and later informed that he was the successful candidateut there but there was a complication: the sitting bandmaster of the RM Plymouth Division Band, P.S.G. O'Donnell, had applied to become the director of the Grenadier Guards' Band, vacant because of retirement. O'Donnell had the support of the Prince of Wales, for whom he had acted as band director on two royal tours. Assuming O'Donnell's appointment to the Grenadiers was a mere formality, the Marines had advertised the presumed upcoming vacancy for the Plymouth Division Band, for which Ricketts was approved.

Then an objection was raised by a senior army bandmaster, quoting a piece of military legislation which stated that a member of the Senior Service (Royal Navy and Royal Marines) could not be commissioned into the Army. The objection was upheld, O'Donnell was blocked from the Grenadier Guards, and Ricketts' appointment was cancelled. The Kneller Hall vacancy had been filled by Captain Hector Adkins, so Ricketts remained with the Argyll and Sutherland Highlanders for another six years. To make the conductors of the Royal Marines Bands more satisfied in their positions, in June 1921 King George V decreed that all Royal Marine conductors would be commissioned as directors of music. This was a further incentive for Ricketts to bide his time.

But this 1921 incident reveals much about the character of Ricketts. If he had accepted the army's invitation to apply for Kneller Hall, he would have been assured of an immediate commission in the rank of lieutenant, and eventual promotions upward to lieutenant colonel. Such was his dedication to staying with a band that he was willing to forgo the position and prestige that would have come with the appointment to Kneller Hall, instead preferring to accept a position with the Royal Marines as a bandmaster in the rank of Warrant Officer Class 1, exactly the same rank he had held through his 19 years with the Argyll and Sutherland Highlanders. It would appear that for Ricketts service with a band meant more than promotion or position.

In 1927, a Royal Marine vacancy occurred, and Ricketts again applied, was approved, and commissioned a lieutenant in the Royal Marines Band Service on 4 July 1927. He was posted to the Royal Marine Depot, Deal. When the headquarters of the Band Service was transferred to Deal in 1930, Ricketts was posted to the Band of the Plymouth Division, Royal Marines, the principal band of the Royal Marines. Under Ricketts' direction, this band became world-famous, traveling to Paris and Canada. Before and during World War II they made a series of 78 RPM recordings of Alford marches, which EMI reissued on an LP in 1970, and now available on CD. It was titled "The British March King - Alford conducts Alford".

From 1935 to 1939, Ricketts conducted the Plymouth Band on a one-hour biweekly BBC Radio programme, and the band was in constant demand to visit military camps and war production factories throughout the Second World War. The workload at that time put a temporary hiatus to his composing, but he resumed in 1941 with "By Land and Sea" and "Army of the Nile", and in 1942 with "Eagle Squadron" dedicated to the Americans who were flying with the Royal Air Force. It was to be his final march.

Ricketts was promoted to Brevet Major on 31 December 1938 (an acting rank without the pay grade), and confirmed as a full Major on 4 July 1942.

== Personal life ==
While on staff at the Royal Military School of Music, Kneller Hall (1906–1908), Ricketts married Annie Louisa Holmes at the Parish Church of All Saints, Tooting Graveney, south London, on 5 September 1907. Annie (Nan) Holmes came from a musical background, her brother being a partner in the London music publishing house of Walsh, Holmes and Company. Ricketts met his bride-to-be over the counter of the firm's shop in Charing Cross Road while buying sheet music. Nan was his greatest fan, often stopping what she was doing (including sleeping) to play an idea on the piano for him or give an opinion on two options for a musical theme. They had six children, Kenneth (born March 1909), Leo (April 1911), Sheila (May 1913), Paula (October 1916), Gordon (October 1918), and José (October 1922).

== Death ==
From 1907 until 1930 Ricketts had never spent more than two years in one place, and this made his 14-year stay in Plymouth all the more pleasant. He became well known and well liked as leader of the Band of the Royal Marines. Ricketts retired from the Royal Marines on 1 June 1944 because of ill health and died at his home in Reigate, Surrey, on 15 May 1945, after an operation for cancer. He had given almost 50 years of distinguished service to the Crown.

== Legacy ==
Alford's marches have been favourably compared to those of John Philip Sousa, both having a thorough grounding in classical music. Although he is best known for his marches, he wrote many other pieces –- hymns, fantasias, humoresques, xylophone solos, and duets. He often combined well-known tunes with new compositions or juxtaposed one with another. His championing of the saxophone played its part in getting the instrument accepted in military bands, and he is also credited with the first arrangements for bagpipes with military band. Like Sousa, he had a remarkable memory and tended to conduct without scores. He had the ear of 'top brass' and could use it to protect the band, something which was much appreciated.

A memorial book was presented by a colleague to the Regimental Museum of the Argyll and Sutherland Highlanders called "A Collection of the Works of F.J. Ricketts". The Royal Marines Commando Training Centre at Lympstone, Devon, is named "Ricketts Hall", and the centenary of his birth in 1981 was marked by a series of concerts at the Albert Hall and in Plymouth—the latter triggering a three-column article in the Daily Telegraph.

Ricketts was not honoured by the British Establishment, either by being admitted to the Order of the British Empire or the Royal Victorian Order, the personal order of the Monarch, yet he alone established British military music, causing it to be recognized throughout the world.

== List of marches ==
- The Thin Red Line (1908) – named after his regiment's nickname, acquired in the Crimean War, when "the thin red streak tipped with a line of steel" of the 93rd (Sutherland Highlanders) Regiment of Foot held back the Russian advance. Not published and available to the public until 1925.
- Holyrood (1912) – named after the Palace of Holyroodhouse in Edinburgh, commemorating the coronation year visit of King George V and Queen Mary. This march is now the quick march of the RAF Regiment.
- The Vedette (1912) – A vedette is a mounted sentry placed in advance of the outposts, a term probably familiar to Ricketts from his time in India but unfamiliar today.
- Colonel Bogey (1914) – Whistled notes on a golf course, possibly by the colonel, developed into his most famous march.
- The Great Little Army (1916) – commemorating the World War I British soldiers who bore the brunt of everything that was thrown at them, called by the enemy "The Contemptible Little Army". Recording courtesy of the John Horn High School Wind Symphony.
- On the Quarter Deck (1917)
- The Middy (1917) – Both this and the previous march were written to commemorate the naval Battle of Jutland in 1916.
- The Voice of the Guns (1917) – meant initially to honour British artillery in World War I (hence the name), later it became widely adopted by the British army as a whole. Not to be confused with the poem of the same name by Gilbert Frankau (1916). Featured prominently in the film Lawrence of Arabia (1962).
- The Vanished Army (1918) – dedicated to the memory of the first 100,000 soldiers who perished in World War I. Subtitled "They Never Die".
- The Mad Major (1921) – Major Graham Seton Hutchinson was the Mad Major, whose war exploits had won him the Military Cross and a DSO.
- Cavalry of the Clouds (1923) - A salute to the fledgling Royal Air Force.
- Dunedin (1928) – named for the Dunedin Exhibition of 1925/26 in New Zealand.
- Old Panama (1929) – Ricketts returned from Dunedin by way of the Panama Canal
- HM Jollies (1929) – "HM Jollies" is a nickname for the Royal Marines. The march contains snippets of "The Sailor's Hornpipe", "Heart of Oak", "A Life on the Ocean Wave", and "Rule Britannia".
- The Standard of St George (1930) – Inspired by watching Trooping the Colour at Horse Guards Parade. This march was actually featured in the concert programs of the Band of the Royal Marines Depot, Deal, before it was published. The writing of this march is unique in that it does not start with an introduction; the strong first section bursts forth with a telling fanfare figure, below which is a tremendous bass foundation of sustained power for the whole of 32 bars.
- By Land and Sea (1941) – This march was modeled on Alford's entry into a competition in 1934 for an official slow march for the Royal Marines. The title is the anglicized version of the Royal Marines motto "Per Mare Per Terram" and was written for the Plymouth Division, R.M. which includes a portion of the regimental quick march "A Life on the Ocean Wave" and the Royal Marines Bugle Calls. By Land and Sea is a magnificent example of the art of military ceremonial music.
- Army of the Nile (1941) – dedicated to General Wavell for halting the advance of the Axis powers in Egypt Recording courtesy John Horn High School Wind Symphony
- Eagle Squadron (1942) – The Eagle Squadron was composed of American pilots in the RAF before America joined in the war. It then transferred to the USAAF. The march quotes The Star-Spangled Banner, Dixie, and The Royal Air Force March Past.

== Other published works ==
- Valse Riviera (1912)
- Thoughts – waltz (1917)
- A Musical Switch – humoresque (1921)
- The Two Imps – xylophone duet (1923)
- The Lightning Switch – fantasy (1924)
- Mac and Mac – xylophone duet (1928)
- Wedded Whimsies – humorous fantasy for piano solo (1932)
- The Smithy – pastoral fantasy 1933
- The Two Dons – xylophone duet (1933)
- Colonel Bogey on Parade – march fantasy (1939)
- The Hunt – rhapsody (1940)
- Lillibullero (1942) – A march attributed to Henry Purcell, though he probably "borrowed" it. Lillibullero is the official Regimental March of the Royal Electrical and Mechanical Engineers (REME). This Corps was established during the Second World War and so the BBC's official wartime use of Lillibullero may well have played a part in its selection by REME. It was also the unofficial marching song of the wartime Royal Marine Commandos. Ricketts' arrangement was used as a signature tune of the BBC radio program about the Commandos, Into Battle.
- A Life on the Ocean Wave (1944) – In 1882, the Deputy Adjutant General Royal Marines requested that the Bandmaster of each Royal Marine Division (Portsmouth, Plymouth, Chatham) submit an arrangement for a new regimental march for the corps, if possible based on a naval song. Jacob Kappey, the Bandmaster of the Chatham Division, submitted an arrangement of "A Life on the Ocean Wave", a ballad by Henry Russell, with an eight bar trio from "The Sea" by Sigismund Neukomm. It was authorised for use as the regimental quick march of the Corps of Royal Marines in 1882. It was re-arranged by Major Ricketts in 1944.

== Unpublished works ==
Classical and operatic arrangements

- Mefistofele (Boito)
- A Midsummer Night's Dream (Mendelssohn)
- Capriccio Italien (Tchaikovsky)
- Carmen (Bizet)
- Madam Butterfly (Puccini)
- Samson and Delilah (Saint-Saëns)
- Orpheus in the Underworld (Offenbach)
- Symphony in E Minor 'From the New World', 4th movement (Dvořák)
- Rigoletto (Verdi)
- Faust (Gounod)
- Trumpet Voluntary and Air (Clarke)
- Festival March from Tannhäuser (Wagner)
- Tales of Hoffmann (Offenbach)
- Il Trovatore (Verdi)
- Ride of the Valkyries (Wagner)
- Lohengrin (Wagner)
- Symphonie Pathétique, two movements (Tchaikovsky)
- Hungarian Rhapsody No. 2 (Liszt)
- Minuet in G (Schubert)
- Aida (Verdi)
- Lucia di Lammermoor (Donizetti)
- Largo (Handel)

Miscellaneous works

- August Bank Holiday 1914 (Alford)
- Bill the Bosun from the 'Drowsy Dustman Suite' (F. White arr. Alford))
- For Service Overseas – March (Ricketts)
- Ancient Scottish Melodies (traditional arr. Alford)
- Negro Melodies (traditional arr. Alford)
- Nursery Rhymes and Carols (traditional arr. Alford)
- Old English Airs (traditional arr. Alford)
- Ceremonial March on Purcell's Works (Purcell arr. Alford)
- Londonderry Air – Saxophone Quartet (traditional arr. Alford)
- Old English Air – Saxophone Quartet (traditional arr. Alford)
- Air on the G String – Saxophone Quartet (J.S. Bach arr. Alford)
- Bonnie Wee Thing – Cornet Solo (Alford)
- Walt Disney's Silly Symphony (various composers arr. Alford)
- Fantasia for Dunedin, New Zealand (Alford)
