= Serge Bourguignon =

French film director and screenwriter

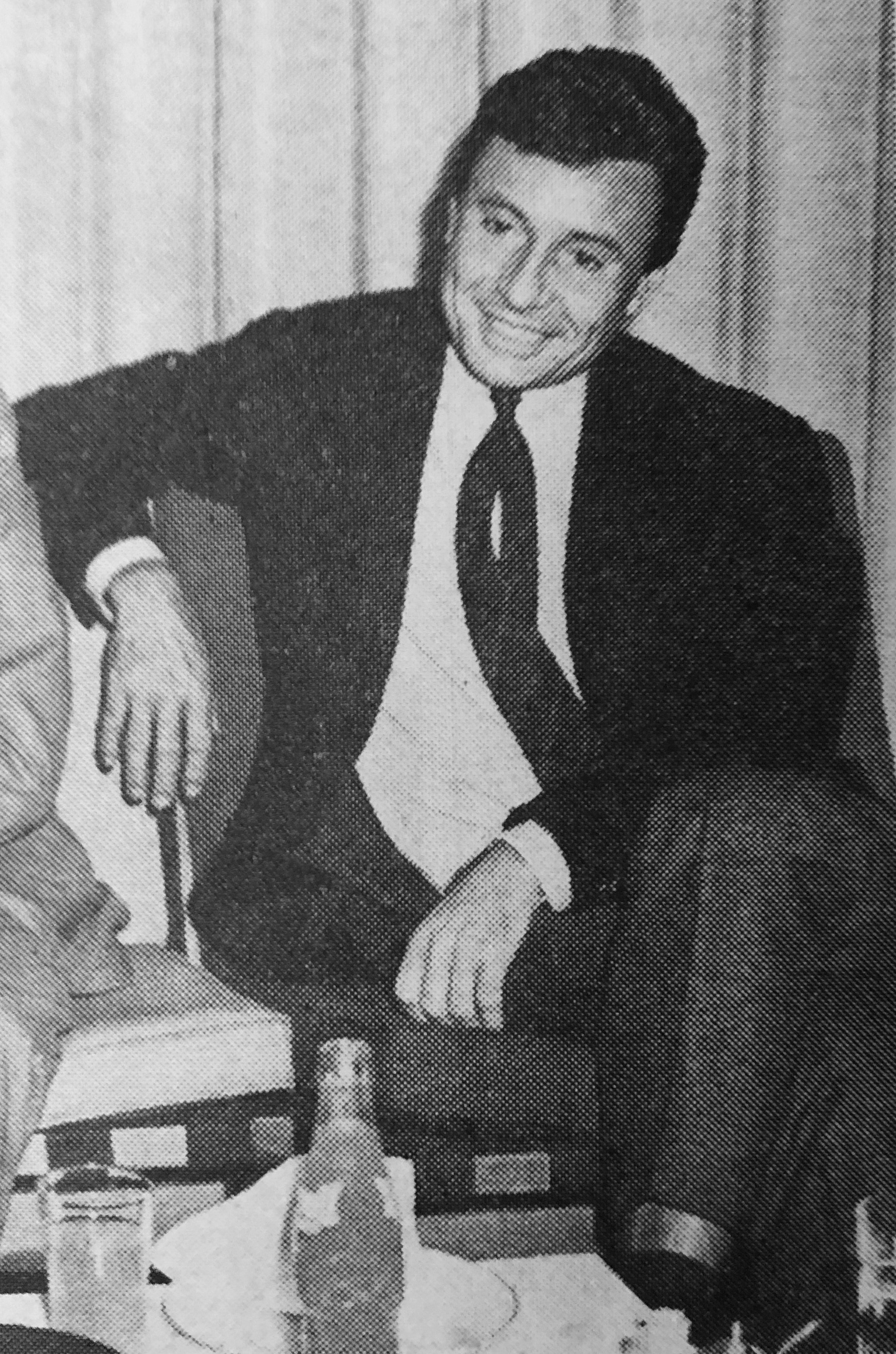
- Bourguignon in 1963
- Born: 3 September 1928 (age 98); Maignelay-Montigny, Oise, Picardy, France
- Occupation: Film director
- Years active: 1951 – 1992

Serge Bourguignon (French: [sɛʁʒ buʁɡiɲɔ̃]; born 3 September 1928) is a French film director and screenwriter. His film Sundays and Cybele won the Academy Award for Best Foreign Language Film of 1962.

== Biography ==
Serge Bourguignon directed several geographical documentaries in Asia, including one on Sikkim during an expedition to the heart of the Himalayas, followed by short films. Notably, his short film Le Sourire won the Short Film Palme d'or at the 1960 Cannes Film Festival.

In 1962, he directed Sundays and Cybele (Les Dimanches de Ville d'Avray), based on a novel by Bernard Eschasseriaux. The film won the Academy Award for Best Foreign Language Film in 1963.

During his era, Serge Bourguignon was snubbed by the French New Wave. According to film critic Michel Aubriant,

he had proclaimed often enough that he did not belong to any school or chapel, that he had earned his stripes traveling through India and Malaysia with a camera in hand, and that the storms in Parisian inkwells left him indifferent

. In the same article, the young filmmaker explained his American success by the fact that audiences saw,

after so many works by young French filmmakers stamped with an amateur spirit, a film that showed a certain respect for the craft

Following this success in the United States, Hollywood came calling. He reportedly turned down 24 directing offers, including Reflections in a Golden Eye and Planet of the Apes. He accepted a project with Natalie Wood titled *Cassandra at the Wedding*, but the agent of the West Side Story star feared that the film would harm the actress's image, as the screenplay detailed an ambiguous relationship between two twin sisters. Bourguignon then decided to direct The Reward (La Récompense) in Death Valley National Park, starring Max von Sydow and Yvette Mimieux, a film he had wanted to make for several years.

Brigitte Bardot, a major star at the time, approached him to direct Two Weeks in September (À cœur joie), shot in Scotland in 1966 alongside Laurent Terzieff, Jean Rochefort, and James Robertson Justice. Despite the film's qualities, when Two Weeks in September was released in 1967, the press focused more on Brigitte Bardot's private life than on the movie itself.

The filmmaker is also frequently credited as the director of the 1969 film The Picasso Summer. However, Robert Sallin was actually brought in to direct after Bourguignon left midway through filming due to a deep disagreement with the producers. Consequently, his name does not appear in the film's credits. Furthermore, Bourguignon had a long-term relationship with actress Yvette Mimieux, whom he had directed on screen.

== Filmography ==
| Year | Title | Credit | Recognitions |
|---|---|---|---|
| 1992 | Impressions d'Extrême-océan | Director | TV Miniseries |
| 1989 | The Fascination | Director | |
| 1978 | Mon royaume pour un cheval | Director | Documentary |
| 1969 | The Picasso Summer | Director (Replaced by Robert Salin) | No U.S. theatrical release. Television premiere in 1972. |
| 1967 | Two Weeks in September | Director | A British/French coproduction. |
| 1965 | The Reward | Director | |
| 1962 | Sundays and Cybele | Director | |
| 1961 | Étoile de mer | Director | Short |
| 1959 | Escale | Director | Short |
| 1959 | Le montreur d'ombres | Director | Short |
| 1957 | Jeune Patriarche | Director | Short |
| 1956 | Sikkim, terre secrète | Director | Documentary |
| 1956–1970 | Le magazine des explorateurs | Director | TV Documentary Series (multiple episodes) |
| 1954 | Bornéo | Director | Short |
| 1953 | Médecins des sols | Director | Short |
