= Sundays and Cybèle =

1962 film

- French theatrical release poster
- Directed by: Serge Bourguignon
- Screenplay by: Serge Bourguignon; Antoine Tudal; Bernard Eschassériaux
- Based on: Les dimanches de Ville d'Avray a 1958 novel by Bernard Eschassériaux
- Produced by: Romain Pinès
- Starring: Hardy Krüger; Nicole Courcel; Patricia Gozzi
- Cinematography: Henri Decaë
- Edited by: Léonide Azar
- Music by: Maurice Jarre
- Distributed by: Columbia Films
- Release date: 12 November 1962
- Running time: 111 minutes
- Country: France
- Language: French

Sundays and Cybèle is a 1962 French drama film in Franscope, directed by Serge Bourguignon. Its original French title is Cybèle ou Les dimanches de Ville d'Avray (Cybèle or Sundays in Ville d'Avray), referring to the Ville-d'Avray suburb of Paris. The film tells the tragic story of a neglected young girl who is befriended by an innocent, but psychologically damaged, veteran of the French Indochina War. Bourguignon wrote the screenplay with Antoine Tudal, and he and Bernard Eschasseriaux, the author of the novel upon which the film is based, are credited with the dialogue.

== Plot ==
Pierre is a pilot who was shot down in the French Indochina War, and his crashing plane may have killed a young Vietnamese girl. Now physically recovered, he lives in an apartment in the Ville-d'Avray suburb of Paris with Madeleine, who was one of his nurses during his initial recuperation, but struggles to return Madeleine's romantic feelings for him, as he has been left childlike and suffers from amnesia and vertigo. He spends time with Carlos, a friend of Madeleine, helping the artist with his projects.

One evening while waiting for Madeleine in the train station, Pierre is approached by a man who asks for directions to St. Marguerite's boarding school, where he is taking his 11-year-old daughter, though she does not want to go. After discovering her father does not intend to ever return to see her, Pierre decides to visit St. Marguerite's the following Sunday, where, posing as the girl's father to the nuns, he takes her for a walk. The girl tells Pierre that the nuns renamed her "Françoise" because her given name is not Christian, but playfully says she will not tell Pierre her real name until he gets her a metal sculpture of a rooster from the spire of a local church. Having already been abandoned by her mother and rejected by her grandmother, she is despondent to learn her father has abandoned her, and initially wants to come live with Pierre, but settles for convincing him to take her away from St. Marguerite's on Sundays once she learns he already lives with Madeleine. Sorry for the girl, but also feeling a kinship with another lost soul, Pierre agrees to the plan, and they begin to spend their Sundays in the park.

Madeleine works on Sundays, and Pierre does not tell her about his relationship with the girl, but other locals begin to take note of the odd pair. The girl says she wants to marry Pierre when she turns 18, and he is jealous of not only her admiration for a handsome horseman, but even her time spent playing with other children in the park, which leads to Pierre slapping a boy. When Madeleine surprises Pierre one Sunday by getting off work so they can spend the day with some friends, Pierre is unable to let the girl know he will not see her. He is distracted at lunch, and, overstimulated, ends up starting a brawl at a fair.

Shortly before Christmas, Madeleine learns from neighbors how Pierre has been spending his Sundays. Carlos is certain Pierre is not a danger to the girl, but Madeleine is not and follows Pierre on his next outing. What she sees reassures her that the relationship is innocent enough.

On Christmas evening, Pierre breaks in the door of Carlos' apartment to steal a Christmas tree for his celebration—complete with champagne—with the girl at a broken-down shed in the park. His present from the girl is her real name: Cybèle. Pierre leaves to get the metal rooster from the church, and, up on the steeple, he finds his vertigo has gone away.

Meanwhile, Carlos calls Madeleine about his door and tree. Worried, she calls Bernard, a doctor at the hospital where she works who is a friend and also has a crush on her, for advice. She does not want to call St. Marguerite's, but, when Bernard arrives to keep her company, he says that, fearing for Cybèle's safety, he has alerted both the nuns and the police. An anxious wait by the phone ends when the police call to say that Pierre and Cybèle have been found, and Pierre is dead.

When Madeleine, Bernard, and Carlos get to the shed in the park, they see Pierre's body and hear an officer saying what a "miracle" it is that the police found Cybèle in time to protect her from Pierre, who was discovered walking toward Cybèle holding the dagger that he and she used to listen to spirits in trees and that he had just used to unscrew the metal rooster. Cybèle cries out in anguish at having lost her only friend, and the closest thing she had to a guardian. Her last words are: "Now I am no one".

== Cast ==
- Hardy Krüger as Pierre, a former military pilot suffering from amnesia
- Nicole Courcel as Madeleine, Pierre's girlfriend and a nurse
- Patricia Gozzi as Cybèle, an 11-year-old abandoned by her father at St. Marguerite's boarding school, where she is renamed "Françoise"
- Daniel Ivernel as Carlos, Madeleine's friend and an artist
- André Oumansky as Bernard, a doctor who has a crush on Madeleine
- Michel de Ré as Fiacre, Bernard's recently-married friend and a pharmacist
- Anne-Marie Coffinet as Françoise, Bernard's date
- René Clermont as the mailman on a bicycle
- Malka Ribovska as Madame Athena, the fortuneteller at the fair
- Jocelyne Loiseau as Sister Marie des Anges, a young nun at St. Marguerite's
- Renée Duchateau as the grocer's wife
- Martine Ferrière as Christiane, Charles' mother
- Albert Hugues as the owner of the café
- Gilbert Edard as Cybèle's father
- Denise Péron as Sister Opportune, a nun at St. Marguerite's
- Bibiane Stern as Carmela, Carlos' wife
- Lisette Le Bon as Monique, Fiacre's new wife
- Paul Bonifas as the grocer
- Alain Bouvette as the employee at the Ville d'Avray subway station (uncredited)
- Dominique Maurin as Charles, the boy who Pierre slaps in the park (uncredited)

Serge Bourguignon and writer Antoine Tudal make uncredited cameo appearances in the film as, respectively, the man on the horse and the painter in the park.

== Production ==
The film director Serge Bourguignon was also asked to direct the film Rapture with Patricia Gozzi, but he said that he didn't want to do it.

== Reception ==
=== Critical response ===
On the review aggregator website Rotten Tomatoes, 55% of 11 critics' reviews of the film are positive, with an average rating of 6.3/10.

=== Awards and nominations ===
Sundays and Cybele won the award for Best Foreign Language Film at the 35th Academy Awards, held in 1963; it was nominated for Best Adapted Screenplay and Best Adapted Score the following year.

Award	Category	Recipient and nominees	Result
35th Academy Awards	Best Foreign Language Film	France	Won
36th Academy Awards	Best Writing, Screenplay Based on Material from Another Medium	Serge Bourguignon; Antoine Tudal	Nominated
36th Academy Awards	Best Scoring of Music—Adaptation or Treatment	Maurice Jarre	Nominated
Blue Ribbon Awards	Best Foreign Language Film	Serge Bourguignon	Won
Golden Globes	Samuel Goldwyn International Award		Won
National Board of Review	Best Foreign Language Film	France	Won

== See also ==
- List of submissions to the 35th Academy Awards for Best Foreign Language Film
- List of French submissions for the Academy Award for Best Foreign Language Film
