= The Voice of the Guns =

This is not to be confused with the poem by Gilbert Frankau.

The Voice of the Guns (1917) is a British military march composed by Kenneth Alford during World War I. It was written as a tribute to British artillerymen serving in the war but later became widely adopted throughout the British Army.

The piece is generally arranged for a full marching band or orchestra, though piano and organ versions have also been composed. Maurice Jarre's score used an arrangement for piccolos (in lieu of fifes) with drums within his overture for Lawrence of Arabia, and he also rearranged the piece for a military band, assembled from the London Philharmonic Orchestra, which segues in an out of fragmentary motifs from the Lawrence theme, later during the film. It is to be remarked that Jarre's arrangement of the march is quite different from the original, and it does not utilize the original 6-bar introduction.

The song starts out with three brief musical phrases, followed by a segue into the main triumphant, fast-moving marching theme which remains throughout the rest of the piece. The full version of the piece generally lasts about three minutes, though longer and shorter arrangements have also been made.

An arrangement of it was famously used in David Lean's film Lawrence of Arabia (1962), to represent the military power of the British Empire. Its most notable use in the film occurs during the scene when Lawrence (Peter O'Toole) and General Allenby (Jack Hawkins) discuss strategy while descending the stairs of the British army headquarters in Cairo.

Today the piece remains a popular selection for marching bands and orchestras. In 1983 the quick march of the Royal Artillery, "British Grenadiers" (in use by the regiment since 1762) was extended, by Lt. Col. Stanley Patch, to include the Trio section from "The Voice Of The Guns", in honour of the Royal Artillery's Captain General, Her Majesty Queen Elizabeth II. The tune British Grenadiers used by the Royal Artillery bands differs from that of the Grenadier Guards only by having different horn parts; other than that they are identical.
