= Michael Varrati =

American screenwriter

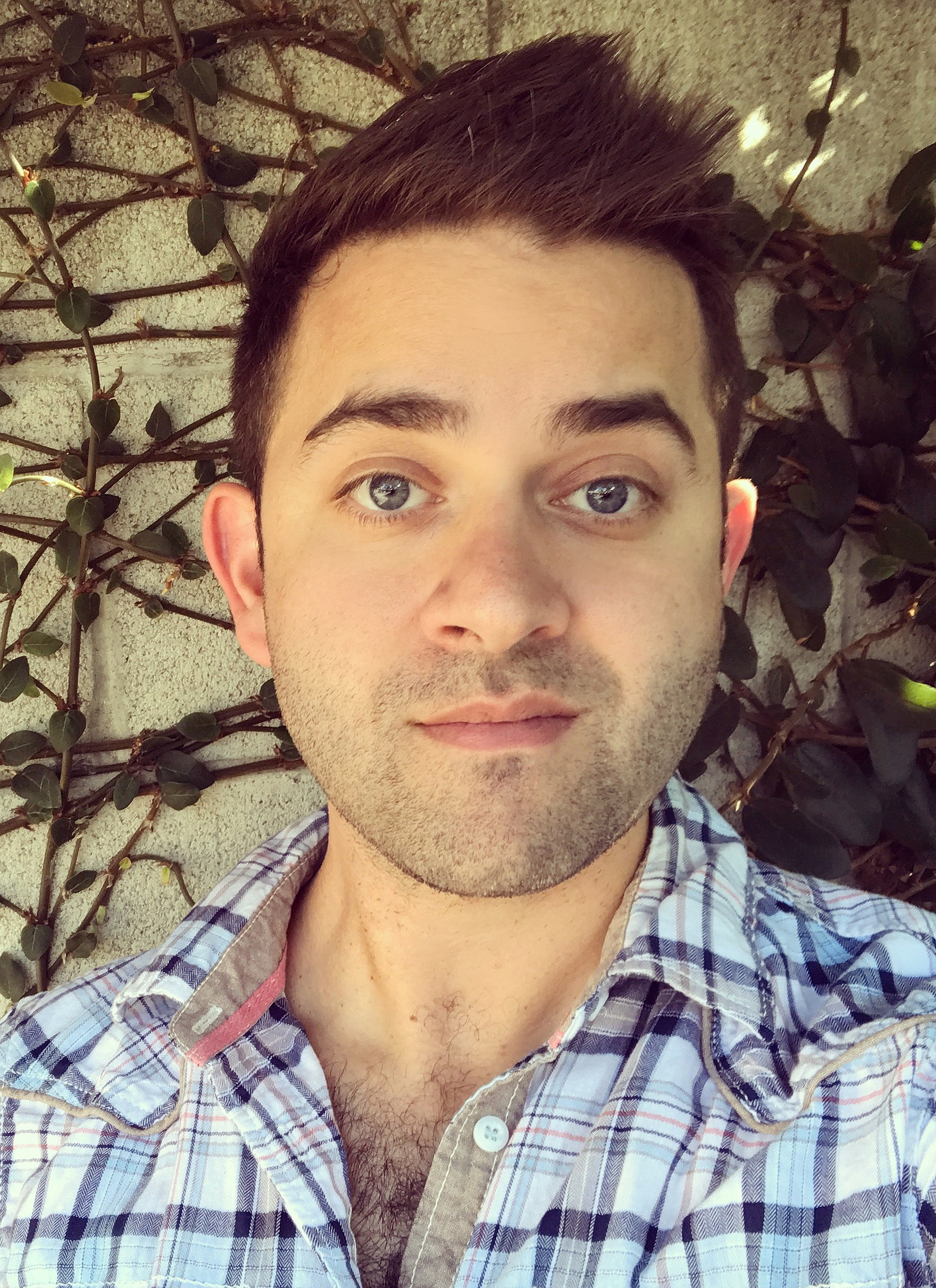
- Michael Varrati
- Born: United States
- Occupations: Filmmaker, screenwriter, columnist, actor
- Notable work: Tales of Poe; The Boulet Brothers' Dragula

Michael Varrati is an American filmmaker, screenwriter, columnist, and actor known primarily for his work within the horror genre and the world of TV movies. Outside of his film work, Varrati writes and speaks about pop culture and the horror genre as it relates to the LGBTQ experience, including at San Diego Comic-Con, and as the host of the queer horror discussion podcast Dead for Filth.

Some of Varrati's notable works include There's a Zombie Outside, Tales of Poe, the screenlife horror Unusual Attachment, episodes of the podcasts Darkest Night and Deadly Manners, and serving as a writer/director of the series The Boulet Brothers' Dragula. In 2014, Agents of Geek named Varrati one of the "9 Must-Follow Geeks on Twitter."

== Early career, column work, and Peaches Christ ==
Born in New Mexico, Varrati was interested in writing fairly early on in his life. Citing exposure to the works of Stephen King and the films shown on USA Up All Night as early influences, Varrati has stated he always knew some aspect of his work would be geared toward the horror genre.

While attending Kent State University in Ohio, Varrati studied acting for the camera under Rohn Thomas. Although primarily identifying as a writer, Varrati would cite this and influencing him to act. Shortly after his time at Kent, Varrati began writing and conducting interviews for the horror film magazine Ultra Violent.

In 2008, while working on a now defunct book project, Varrati connected with San Francisco–based drag performer Peaches Christ (stage name for Joshua Grannell), hoping to interview her for the book. Instead, the two became friends, and when Christ took her directorial debut movie All About Evil on the road, she invited Varrati along to help document the experience. Writing a travelogue from the road for Peaches’ site, Varrati eventually began doing a regular column. In 2016, the two reunited to co-produce an event for the 25th Anniversary of Vegas in Space for the Frameline Film Festival.

Varrati has also been a contributor to The Huffington Post, Tubefilter, and Vice.

== Tales of Poe ==
While acting on the film, Razor Days, Varrati reconnected with the film's director of photography, Bart Mastronardi, whom he had previously met. The duo decided to collaborate on a segment for an anthology of modern adaptations of Edgar Allan Poe stories. Shot over the course of several years, Tales of Poe featured three adaptations of Poe stories: The Tell-Tale Heart (written & directed by Mastronardi), The Cask of Amontillado (written & directed by Alan Rowe Kelly), and Dreams, which was written by Varrati and directed by Mastronardi.

The Dreams segment, written by Varrati was noted for casting past scream queens Adrienne King, Amy Steel, and Caroline Williams. The segment was reviewed positively by Decay magazine as "an excellent exhibition of experimental Horror filmmaking." Varrati has said that the segment allowed him "give life to an existential crisis" on film and cites filmmakers Derek Jarman and Jean Cocteau as influential. Tales of Poe premiered on August 20, 2014, at the Egyptian Theatre in Hollywood.

== The Sins of Dracula and Flesh for the Inferno ==
While making Tales of Poe, Varrati began collaborating with Richard Griffin on a short about gay aliens titled Crash Site, and later worked on a feature film: The Sins of Dracula. The Sins of Dracula is a horror comedy about a community theater troupe who must stop the newly risen Count Dracula. The film satirizes Christian scare films of the early 80s. Released on October 26, 2014, The Sins of Dracula was called a "modern classic" by Horror Society.

Griffin and Varrati would collaborate again a year later on Flesh for the Inferno, an Italian horror homage about demon nuns who attack a church youth group. Praised as a "dark, gory horror film with edge," Flesh for the Inferno was named "Best Independent Horror Film of 2015" by Horror Society. Griffin and Varrati have also collaborated on the short film Hearty Treats and a faux-trailer They Stole the Pope’s Blood. Additionally, Varrati contributed writing to Griffin's horror comedy Seven Dorms of Death.

== Christmas movies and TV thrillers ==
In 2015, Varrati co-wrote the script for A Christmas Reunion, a holiday film starring Denise Richards and Patrick Muldoon that debuted on the Ion Network. In 2016, Varrati wrote another holiday film, A Christmas in Vermont, starring Chevy Chase, Morgan Fairchild, and Howard Hesseman that also appeared on Ion. That same year, Varrati would also create the original story for Broadcasting Christmas, which was adapted by playwright Topher Payne for the Hallmark Channel and starred Melissa Joan Hart and Dean Cain. In 2020, Varrati returned to the genre, writing the original script for the Canadian-produced Christmas with a Crown and co-writing the Mar Vista Entertainment produced A Christmas Mission.

In an interview with The Wall Street Journal, Varrati spoke about the fact that he was able to write both horror and holiday fare, saying that he felt both kinds of story were important, as they catered to different needs of the audience.

Varrati has also written a number of thrillers and genre adjacent pieces for TV networks, including the Lifetime original movie The Wrong Stepmother, produced by Vivica A. Fox, the 2019 Lifetime thriller The Twisted Nanny (alternatively titled in some markets as The Nightmare House), and the disaster movie End of the World. In 2021, Varrati also provided the original story for the Vivica Fox-starring horror movie Aquarium of the Dead, which was adapted to screen by writer Marc Gottlieb.

== Directorial work and June Gloom Productions ==
While working as a producer and writer on the series I’m Fine, Varrati met series creator Brandon Kirby and together started June Gloom Productions to produce their own work and that of queer filmmakers. Through June Gloom, Varrati has written and directedThe Office is Mine, queer slasher A Halloween Trick, and the isolation horror film What’s Left Inside, which made its North American Premiere at Outfest in 2021.

Fairly early into the COVID-19 pandemic, Varrati released Unusual Attachment, shot entirely remotely as a screenlife/found footage narrative about a man who runs into unspeakable horrors while using online dating sites. Later in the pandemic, Brandon Kirby and Michael Varrati would use this remote shooting technique to co-create a queer drama miniseries titled So Far, So Close for the Dekkoo streaming platform. Outside of June Gloom, Varrati wrote and directed a segment of the international holiday horror anthology film Deathcember and wrote and directed on the series The Boulet Brothers' Dragula.

== The LGBTQ+ Horror Panel ==
Since 2013, Varrati has served as the host and curator of the "Queer Fear" panel at San Diego Comic Con. The panel has garnered attention over the years for its in-depth discussion of LGBTQ+ issues and its high-profile guests (which have included Bryan Fuller, Jeffrey Reddick, Guinevere Turner, and more). Throughout the year, Varrati will also host variants on the panel and has written numerous pieces pertaining to its topic.

In 2021, Varrati hosted a virtual version of the Queer Horror panel due to Comic-Con's in-person events being postponed by the ongoing COVID pandemic.

== Dead for Filth and Midnight Mass ==
Motivated by the annual discussions being had at the LGBTQ+ Horror Panel at Comic-Con, Varrati created Dead for Filth, a streaming audio series that debuted in August 2017. Originally produced by Revry Dead for Filth was a weekly, in-depth interview podcast. During its run, Dead for Filth was named by The Advocate as one of "12 LGBTQ Podcasts You Should Be Listening To" and by NBC as an LGBTQ Podcast "To Know."

In 2021, Varrati returned to the podcast space to co-host a new series, Midnight Mass, with Peaches Christ. Inspired and named for Peaches Christ's long-running cult movie series in San Francisco, Midnight Mass is weekly discussion into the nature and devoted fanbase of cult cinema.

== Other work ==
Varrati has twice collaborated with filmmaker JT Seaton on short film projects that have played at various festivals. The first of which was a comedic time travel short titled Then and Again that starred Sleepaway Camp’s Jonathan Tiersten, and the second was a dark fairy tale titled In Darkest Slumber.

Varrati reunited with his Tales of Poe collaborators Bart Mastronardi and Alan Rowe Kelly in 2015 to work with filmmaker Billy Clift on a short film biopic about the life of Hollywood actor Montgomery Clift, titled Monty. With an original script by Varrati, the film was shot by Mastronardi, directed by Clift, and premiered at the Cinema Diverse Film Festival in Palm Springs in 2016.

In late 2016, Nightmarish Conjurings named Mystery Phone, a short written by Varrati and directed by Ama Lea, as one of the best horror shorts of the year. Varrati and Ama Lea would later work together again on the lesbian vampire short From Hell, She Rises, which was also directed by Lea.

Also in 2016, Varrati wrote a number of pop culture oriented videos for Frederator Studios’ (creators of Adventure Time) YouTube channel.

In 2017, Varrati joined the writing team of the narrative horror podcast Darkest Night starring Lee Pace, Denis O’Hare, and RuPaul. Shortly thereafter, he also became one of the writers for the murder mystery audio series Deadly Manners, starring Kristen Bell, Anna Chlumsky, and LeVar Burton.

In October 2018, Varrati wrote and served as the on-camera host of Skybound's History of Fright, a multi-part digital series about the history of horror icons and subgenres. The series ran on Skybound's GammaRay Channel.

In October 2020, Varrati wrote and directed the Halloween Special episode of the narrative audio series It Listens from the Radio.

As an actor, Varrati has appeared in numerous independent horror films and has worked with such notable filmmakers as Lloyd Kaufman, Mike Mendez, and Stuart Gordon.

== Current and upcoming work ==
Peaches Christ has revealed in several interviews that she and Varrati are currently co-writing a feature film script together, which will serve as a follow-up to her directorial debut.
