= Slices of Life =

Slices of Life may refer to:

- Slices of Life (1985 film), a French comedy-sci fi film
- Slices of Life (2010 film), an American horror film

== See also ==
- A Slice of Life (disambiguation)
