= Eagle in a Cage =

Eagle in a Cage may refer to:

- Eagle in a Cage (Hallmark Hall of Fame), a 1965 episode of the TV series Hallmark Hall of Fame
- Eagle in a Cage (film), a 1971 American-British historical drama film, based on the above
