= Inherit the Wind =

Inherit the Wind may refer to:

- Inherit the Wind (play), a 1955 play by Jerome Lawrence and Robert Edwin Lee
- Inherit the Wind (1960 film), directed by Stanley Kramer; starring Spencer Tracy, Fredric March, and Gene Kelly
- Inherit the Wind (Hallmark Hall of Fame), an episode of the TV series Hallmark Hall of Fame starring Melvyn Douglas and Ed Begley
- Inherit the Wind (1988 film), a television film starring Jason Robards, Kirk Douglas, and Darren McGavin
- Inherit the Wind (1999 film), a television film starring Jack Lemmon, George C. Scott, and Beau Bridges
- "Inherit the Wind" (Bunheads), a 2012 television episode
- "Inherit the Wind" (Roseanne), a 1989 television episode
