= Slices of Life (2010 film) =

- Theatrical release poster
- Directed by: Anthony G Sumner
- Written by: Anthony G Sumner; Eric Richter; Alan Rowe Kelly
- Produced by: Anthony G Sumner; Eric Richter
- Starring: Kaylee Williams; Toya Turner; Deneen Melody; Jack Guasta
- Cinematography: Eric Richter
- Edited by: Anthony G Sumner; Eric Richter
- Music by: Gene Hodsdon
- Production company: Tinycore Pictures LLC
- Release date: October 23, 2010
- Country: United States
- Language: English

Slices of Life is a 2010 independent horror anthology film directed by Anthony G Sumner and written by Sumner, Eric Richter and Alan Rowe Kelly, which explores the terror of everyday life. Four years in the making, the film completed production in 2010.

== Plot ==
"Sexual parasites, disembowelment, zombies, serial killers, demon children, violent vixens, rabid office workers, aliens, mummies, skeleton warriors, vampires, werewolves, dragons, medusa, beasts, giants, robots, cyclops' and angry embryos all spring to life from the flesh covered sketch books featured in Anthony G. Sumner’s (Gallery of Fear) Slices of Life.

Mira (Kaylee Williams) awakens in front of a seedy roadside motel with amnesia. She searches for clues to her identity in the pages of three bound sketchbooks, in which each book represents a different aspect of everyday life, maybe her life.

WORK LIFE
A lowly clerk at a nano technology firm unleashes a deadly virus at the office headquarters, giving new meaning to the term corporate zombie.

HOME LIFE
As local girls begin to disappear, a young pregnant woman is haunted by visions of evil demonic children hell bent on stealing her unborn fetus.

SEX LIFE
A young brother and sister on the run from a sexually abusive home life, take refuge in a countryside Victorian manor- only to discover the monsters hidden in this house have been looking for a new home.

Convinced that the characters from these books are roaming around the motel, Mira’s reality begins to crumble. Are these visions real or is she going insane? Desperate, Mira turns to the motel caretakers (Marv Blauvelt and Helene Alter-Dyche), only to discover the true evil bound in the flesh covered books and the destiny they hold for her.
At home… at work… at play… terror is never far away."

== Cast ==
| Cast | Character |
|---|---|
| Kaylee Williams | Mira (segment "Sketcher") |
| Jack Guasta | William Robert Moss (segment "W.O.R.M") |
| Toya Turner | Vonda (segment "Amber Alert") |
| Deneen Melody | Susan Ballard (segment "Pink Snapper") |
| Marv Blauvelt | Tiny (segment "Sketcher") |
| Thurston Hill | Lamont (segment "Amber Alert") |
| Galen Schloming | Eric Ballard (segment "Pink Snapper") |
| Judith Lesser | Elizabeth Nadasdy (segment "Pink Snapper") |
| Bruce Varner | Edgar Nadasdy (segment "Pink Snapper") |
| Helene Alter-Dyche | Irma (segment "Sketcher") |
| Alan Rowe Kelly | Web Cam Vamp (segment "W.O.R.M") |
| Holly Fishburn | Newscaster |
| Ivory Tiffin | Temp (segment "W.O.R.M") |
| Jamia Vinci | Ally (segment "Amber Alert") |
| Mike Tracy | Jack Ballard (segment "Pink Snapper") |
| Kate Roberts | Rebecca (segment "Amber Alert") |
| Eva Rodriguez | Webcam girl (segment "W.O.R.M") |
| Christopher Karbo | Prankster (segment "W.O.R.M") |
| Samantha Jones | Webcam girl / twin (segment "W.O.R.M") |
| Lauree Enos | Know it all (segment "W.O.R.M") |
| Debbie Roberts | Louise (segment "Amber Alert") |
| George Wyhinny | Climber (segment "W.O.R.M") |
| Rachel Evans | Martyr (segment "W.O.R.M") |
| Laurie Ramirez | College web advisor (segment "W.O.R.M") |
| Claire Ryan | Laurie (segment "Pink Snapper") |
| Alexandra K. Jones | Webcam girl / twin (segment "W.O.R.M") |
| Debbie Di Verde | Ball Breaker (segment "W.O.R.M") |
| Ryan Young | Camera man (segment "W.O.R.M") |
| Paul Mackey | Grocery Store Shopper (segment "Amber Alert") |
| Kristin Francis | Grocery Store Shopper (segment "Amber Alert") |
| Becky Adorable | Webcam girl (segment "W.O.R.M") |
| Keith Ehrenberg | Biohazard Man (segment "W.O.R.M") |
| Frank Pendleton | Kiss Ass (segment "W.O.R.M") |
| Mitchell Forde | Biohazard man / Zombie (segment "W.O.R.M") |
| Tom Sumner | Grocery Store Shopper (segment "Amber Alert") |
| George Albergo | George (segment "W.O.R.M") |
| Veronica Francis | Dead Girl 3 (segment "Amber Alert") |
| Steven Francis | Grocery Store Shopper (segment "Amber Alert") |
| Matt Schoon | Biohazard man (segment "W.O.R.M") |
| Mary Bridget Gentleman | Webcam girl (segment "W.O.R.M") |
| Gary Ferguson | Boss (segment "W.O.R.M") |
| Cathy Partipilo | Webcam girl (segment "W.O.R.M") |
| Maxwell Burnham | Male Corpse in Tub (segment "Pink Snapper") |
| Devon Elizabeth | Gossip (segment "W.O.R.M") |
| Nicole Vinci | Cee Cee (segment "Amber Alert") |
| Monica Avila | Webcam girl (segment "W.O.R.M") |
| Patty Sumner | Grocery Store Shopper (segment "Amber Alert") |
| Isabella Francis | Dead Girl 1 (segment "Amber Alert") |
| Jamie Vinci | Grocery Store Boy (segment "Amber Alert") |
| Sara Siegel | Flirt (segment "W.O.R.M") |
| Tina Cunningham | Webcam girl (segment "W.O.R.M") |
| Byron Samuel | Back Stabber (segment "W.O.R.M") |
| Kenyatta McClure | Grocery Store Mom (segment "Amber Alert") |
| Kristine Burdi | Nurse (segment "Pink Snapper") |
| Bianca Banich | Dead Girl 2 (segment "Amber Alert") |
| Corey Williamson | Grocery Store Shopper (segment "Amber Alert") |

== Production ==
The segment titled W.O.R.M. (Work Life), was completed in 2007. It has been featured in many festivals and has won several awards. The Home Life segment (Amber Alert) was finished in 2008 and Sex Life (Pink Snapper) was completed in 2009. The wrap-around segment finished production in 2010. The overall feature is in the final stages of post-production, getting finishing touches to the score by composer Gene Hodsdon and 5.1 stereo mix by Sean Sutton.

As of October 2010, Production of the feature film Slices of Life has completed final post production. Slices of Life premiered at the Portage Theater in Chicago on October 23, 2010 as part of the 2010 Horror Society Film Festival.

== Awards and reviews ==
The W.O.R.M. segment won the following awards while it toured festivals in 2007:

- Stephen King Award for Best Film at the Silver Screams Film Festival in Houston, TX
- Best Special Effects at the Dark Carnival Film Festival in Bloomington, IN
- Audience Choice at the Chicago International REEL Shorts Festival Film Festival in Chicago, IL

The teaser trailer for the full film was applauded in the review by Christopher Stipp of Slash Films on April 23, 2010. Stipp said "Director and co-writer Anthony G. Sumner, along with writers Alan Rowe Kelly and Eric Richter, brings a story that feels more like a compendium than it does one single film. Feeling like a cross between Freddy’s Nightmares, Monsters, and Tales from the Darkside, the trailer just roars right out of the gate with nothing more than a close-up of a phonograph being used and a lovely young fräulein splayed out on some grass, the camera turning slowly. It’s haunting and I love it because we’re given zero information about what’s going on in front of us. No interstitial, no voiceover, nothing to indicate what it is we’re seeing.
I appreciate that this trailer is able to get me excited in much the same way the idea of Trick 'r Treat did when it came out. I have a fondness for short story horror and this movie looks like it can capture that same sensibility if it can be as good as this trailer is."
