= Pamela Franklin =

British actress (born 1950)

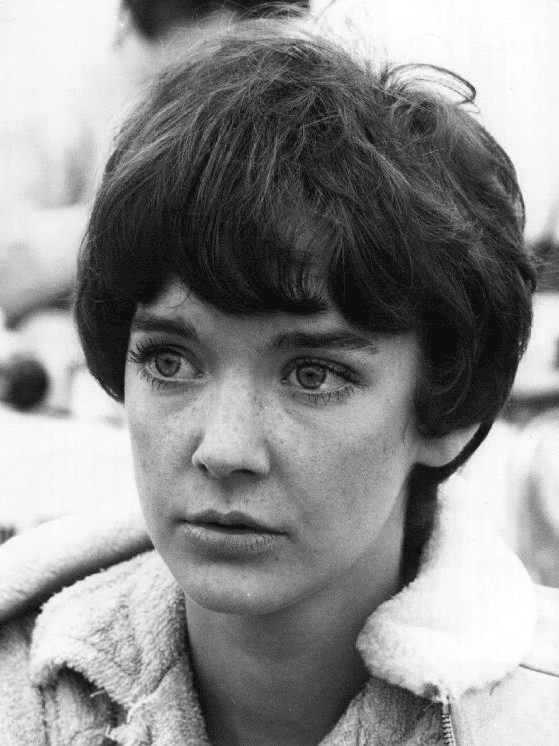
- Franklin in 1973
- Born: 3 February 1950 (age 76); Yokohama, Japan
- Education: Elmhurst Ballet School
- Occupation: Actress
- Years active: 1961–1981
- Known for: The Prime of Miss Jean Brodie; The Legend of Hell House; The Nanny
- Spouse: Harvey Jason (m. 1970)
- Children: 2
- Awards: National Board of Review Award for Best Supporting Actress

Pamela Franklin (born 3 February 1950) is a retired British actress. She is best known for her role as Sandy in the film The Prime of Miss Jean Brodie (1969), for which she received the National Board of Review Award for Best Supporting Actress and was nominated for the BAFTA Award in the same category.

Franklin made her acting debut at the age of 11 in the film The Innocents (1961). She later established herself as a scream queen in the 1970s by appearing in the films Necromancy (1972) and The Legend of Hell House (1973).

== Early life ==
Franklin, who had three brothers, was born in Yokohama, Japan, and spent her early years in East Asia, where her father was an importer/exporter. The family lived in Japan, Hong Kong, Australia, and Ceylon before returning to the United Kingdom. When she was eight she was sent to the Elmhurst School of Ballet in the UK.

== Early career ==
Franklin made her film debut at age 11 in The Innocents (1961), and her TV debut in the Walt Disney's Wonderful World of Color's The Horse Without a Head (1963).

Franklin played opposite William Holden and Trevor Howard in the British film The Lion (1962) and co-starred with Luke Halpin in Flipper's New Adventure (1963) as a wealthy industrialist's daughter. In 1963, Franklin was voted 10th place for the Laurel Awards Top New Female Personality. She was 14 when she appeared in The Third Secret (1964), in which she played a troubled young daughter. In 1966, she had a lead role in the BBC TV series Quick Before They Catch Us.

== Later career in film and television ==
Franklin received favourable notices for her portrayal of an unusually worldly teenager in the suspense film The Nanny (1965) starring Bette Davis. She also received an Emmy nomination for her supporting role in the TV movie Eagle in a Cage (also 1965) in which she again acted opposite Trevor Howard. She acted with Dirk Bogarde, who played her father in Our Mother's House (1967), a film that was nominated for the Golden Lion at the Venice Film Festival. Not long afterwards, Franklin played opposite Marlon Brando and Rita Moreno in The Night of the Following Day (1969) as the kidnap victim in the crime thriller. This was her first "adult" role, with one scene showing her topless. She appeared with Michele Dotrice in the horror thriller And Soon the Darkness (1970), a film that was remade in 2010.

For her role as Sandy in The Prime of Miss Jean Brodie (1969), Franklin won the National Board of Review award for Best Supporting Actress. The film featured a strong cast, including Maggie Smith, who won an Academy Award for Best Actress. In the same year, she starred with a young John Hurt in the John Huston movie Sinful Davey, which was not successful and failed to boost her career.

In 1971, she starred in the penultimate episode of Green Acres, titled "Hawaiian Honeymoon". The episode was a backdoor pilot for the proposed sitcom titled Pam, which would have featured Franklin and Don Porter as a father and daughter operating the Moana Rexford hotel in Hawaii. The pilot was not picked up.

As an adult, Franklin became somewhat typecast in horror films after her performances in the popular occult thrillers Necromancy (1972) and The Legend of Hell House (1973) opposite Roddy McDowall. This was followed with the television horror movie Satan's School for Girls (1973). Her last film role was in The Food of the Gods (1976), although she made television appearances until 1981, including an episode of Police Story, in which she became physically ill playing a rape victim.

Franklin made other television appearances, including Cannon, The Love Boat, Fantasy Island, The Six Million Dollar Man, Hawaii Five-O, Barnaby Jones, Vega$, and Trapper John, M.D.. She played the title character in "Jenny Wilde is Drowning", an episode of The Name of the Game, starring Tony Franciosa. Her character was an aspiring actress trying to succeed in Hollywood.

== Personal life ==
Franklin met British actor Harvey Jason, 10 years her senior, on the set of Necromancy. Although the film was not released until 1972, the couple married in 1970, settled near Hollywood and had two sons. Her husband and one of their sons, Louis, co-own a bookstore in West Hollywood.

On the commentary track for the 2014 Region A Blu-ray release of The Legend of Hell House released by Scream Factory, Franklin notes that she was pregnant with her second child while filming The Food of the Gods and that she was ready for a change of career, although she enjoyed making the film and living on the island location. She also claimed working in television in the United States was a mistake at the time, as it limited her career and producers only saw her as a TV actor from then on.

== Filmography ==
- The Innocents (1961)
- The Lion (1962)
- Walt Disney's Wonderful World of Color: The Horse Without A Head (1963) (Two Episodes)
- Flipper's New Adventure (1964)
- See How They Run (1964) (TV)
- A Tiger Walks (1964)
- The Third Secret (1964)
- Eagle in a Cage (1965) (TV)
- The Nanny (1965)
- Quick Before They Catch Us (1966) TV lead role as "Kate"
- Our Mother's House (1967)
- The Night of the Following Day (1968)
- David Copperfield (1969) (TV)
- The Prime of Miss Jean Brodie (1969)
- Sinful Davey (1969)
- Strange Report (1969) (TV) episode "Report 5055: Cult Murder Shrieks Out"
- Medical Center (1970–74) (TV) several guest appearances
- The Name of the Game (1970) (TV) episode "Jenny Wilde is Drowning"
- And Soon the Darkness (1970)
- Green Acres (1971) (TV) episode "Hawaiian Honeymoon" pilot/spin-off attempt
- Cannon (1972, 1974) (TV) episodes "The Predators" and "Where's Jennifer?"
- Necromancy (1972)
- Bonanza (1972) episode "First Love" as Kelly Edwards
- Ace Eli and Rodger of the Skies (1973)
- Circle of Fear (1973) (TV) episode "Half a Death"
- Intertect (1973) (TV)
- The Legend of Hell House (1973)
- The Letters (1973) (TV)
- Satan's School for Girls (1973) (TV)
- Love Story (1973) (TV) episode "Mirabelle's Summer" as Mirabelle Terhune
- The Streets of San Francisco (1974) (TV) episode "Crossfire" as Peggy Dunnigan
- The Magician (1974) (TV) episode "The Illusion of the Fatal Arrow" as Linda, a Psychic
- The Six Million Dollar Man (1974) (TV) episode "Operation Firefly" as Susan Abbott
- Mannix (1974) (TV) episode "A Fine Day for Dying" as Jenny Cole
- Barnaby Jones (1975, 1980) (TV) episodes "Murder Once Removed" and "Focus on Fear"
- Crossfire (1975) (TV)
- Insight (1975) (TV) episode "Somewhere Before"
- Thriller (1975) (TV) episodes "Screamer" and "Won't Write Home Mom, I'm Dead"
- The Food of the Gods (1976)
- Eleanor and Franklin (1976) (TV)
- Hawaii Five-O (1977) (TV) episode "To Die in Paradise" as Bobbie Jo Bell
- The Love Boat (1977) (TV) episode "Dear Beverly/The Strike/Special Delivery" as Gail Smith
- Police Woman (1978) (TV) episode "Battered Teachers" as Karen Vaughn
- Fantasy Island (1978) (TV) episodes "Reunion/Anniversary" and "Let the Good Times Roll/Nightmare/the Tiger"
- The Hardy Boys/Nancy Drew Mysteries (1978) (TV) episodes "Defection to Paradise: Part 1 " and "Defection to Paradise: Part 2" as Marla
- Fantasy Island (1979) (TV) episode "Tattoo: the Love God/Magnolia Blossoms" (1979)
- Fantasy Island (1981) (TV) episode "The Chateau/White Lightning"
- Vega$ (TV) episode "The Killing"

== Awards and nominations ==
| Year | Award | Category | Work | Result | Ref. |
|---|---|---|---|---|---|
| 1963 | Laurel Awards | Top New Female Personality | —N/a | 10th place | |
| 1966 | Primetime Emmy Awards | Outstanding Performance by an Actress in a Supporting Role in a Drama | Hallmark Hall of Fame (Episode: "Eagle in a Cage") | Nominated | |
| 1970 | National Board of Review Awards | Best Supporting Actress | The Prime of Miss Jean Brodie | Won | |
| 1970 | British Academy Film Awards | Best Supporting Actress | The Prime of Miss Jean Brodie | Nominated | |
