= The Powers of Matthew Star =

American sci-fi television series (1982–1983)

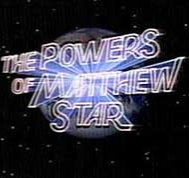
- Title screen
- Genre: Science fiction
- Created by: Steven E. de Souza
- Developed by: Daniel Wilson; Harve Bennett; Robert Earll; Allan Balter
- Written by: David Carren; Steven E. de Souza; Gregory S. Dinallo; Gil Grant; William Mageean; Richard Christian Matheson; Bruce Shelly; Thomas E. Szollosi
- Directed by: Barry Crane; Guy Magar; Leslie H. Martinson; Ron Satlof
- Starring: Peter Barton; Louis Gossett Jr. Amy Steel; Chip Frye; Michael Fairman; John Crawford; James Karen
- Composers: Michel Rubini and Denny Jaeger (1982); Johnny Harris (1983)
- Country of origin: United States
- Original language: English
- No. of seasons: 1
- No. of episodes: 22

Production
- Executive producers: Harve Bennett (1982); Bruce Lansbury (1983)
- Producers: Harve Bennett; Steven E. de Souza; Daniel Wilson
- Cinematography: Héctor R. Figueroa
- Running time: 60 minutes
- Production companies: Daniel Wilson Productions; Harve Bennett Productions (1982–83); Paramount Television

Original release
- Network: NBC
- Release: September 17, 1982 – April 15, 1983

The Powers of Matthew Star is an American science fiction television series that aired on NBC on Friday evenings from September 17, 1982 until April 8, 1983. It starred Peter Barton as the title character, the alien prince Matthew "E'Hawke" Star of the planet Quadris, who used his powers to fight crime. Also starring were Amy Steel as Pam Elliot, Matthew’s girlfriend at Crestridge High; and Louis Gossett Jr. as Walt "D'Hai" Shepherd, Matthew’s guardian.

In 2002, The Powers of Matthew Star was ranked #22 on the list of TV Guide's "50 Worst TV Shows of All Time".

On June 7, 2020, the program began airing in syndication on Sundays at 6:00 a.m. as part of MeTV's Super SciFi Saturday Night block.

== Series history ==
The show was created by Steven E. de Souza, and developed by Daniel Wilson, Harve Bennett, Robert Earll, and Allan Balter. Wilson, Bennett and Bruce Lansbury were the executive producers. Star Trek actors worked behind the scenes in a few episodes: Leonard Nimoy directed the episode "Triangle", and Walter Koenig wrote the episode "Mother".

The series underwent numerous title changes during development. These included Starr Knight, Star Prince, Knight Star, The Powers of David Star, The Powers of Daniel Star, and finally The Powers of Matthew Star. The original pilot (Starr Knight) was to deal with teenager David Star, who lived with the school janitor, Max (Gerald S. O'Loughlin). Max had a secret he was not sharing with David, who had no idea that he and Max were from another planet. As his powers began to surface, David started to understand who he was. Hot on their trail was the FBI. The original pilot was aired as the last episode of the series. As an example of one of the late title changes of the series, the Canadian issue of TV Guide's 1981 Fall Preview issue listed it as The Powers of Daniel Star with a full-page photo and paragraph, whereas US versions gave the series a half-page blurb with the correct title The Powers of Matthew Star. To add to the confusion, the actual writeup in the Canadian issues correctly referred to "Matthew Star," meaning they did get the memo of the latest name change but failed to update the header at the top of the page.

The program, originally slated to debut on January 3, 1982 with the new title and storyline, was delayed when on November 12, 1981, Peter Barton fell backward onto pyrotechnics (specifically a magnesium flare) and was badly burned, while co-star Louis Gossett Jr., tied to a chair, had fallen on top of Barton but managed to rescue him. After a month in the hospital, Barton was released, recovering at home while the show's production was shut down for four months. The series resumed shooting in early March, 1982.

The series was cancelled after one season.

== Plot ==
=== Introduction ===
D'Hai/Walt Shepherd's (Louis Gossett Jr.) dialogue over the opening theme tells the tale of E'Hawke/Matthew Star (Peter Barton):

Quadris, twelve light years across the galaxy from Earth. It was home for us until an intergalactic armada conquered it. I fought by the royal family's side, but in vain – even their remarkable powers weren't enough. The crown prince and I escaped to the nearest planet on which we could survive and further his powers in order to someday return to free his people. Here on Earth, the prince is known as Matthew Star. He's a typical American teenager. He has friends – people who love him – and me, his guardian. I'm the only one who knows how special he is. Life for us is a series of joys and dangers. Enemy assassins constantly come to destroy us. Alone, we must survive.

Louis Gossett Jr. and Peter Barton

=== First half of series ===
The first half of the series' run dealt with Matthew Star attending Crestridge High School and trying to survive his teenage years while dodging assassins, all under the watchful eye of his guardian, Walt Shepherd, who stayed nearby as a science teacher at the school. Those in their lives who had no idea about the truth were Matthew's girlfriend Pam Elliot (Amy Steel), his friend Bob Alexander (Chip Frye), and the merry principal, Mr. Heller (Michael Fairman).

General Tucker (John Crawford), a U.S. Air Force officer specializing in extraterrestrial investigations, had tracked the two of them across the country as they evaded alien agents intent on exterminating them. From time to time, he enlisted their specialized aid in solving monumental problems.

The first dozen episodes dealt with the daily troubles of high school students, although in the episode "The Triangle," a chance trip to the Bermuda Triangle resulted in the discovery of Quadrian messengers, who told the pair that the king had been executed. E'Hawke/Matthew was crowned the new king in a torch-lit cave.

In the episode "Mother," a strange carnival gypsy is revealed to be Matthew's mother, Nadra, who had been traveling the galaxy and hiding from assassins. This reunion was bittersweet; due to Nadra's health problems, she was forced to leave Crestridge for an undisclosed location at a higher elevation.

Finally, in the "Fugitives" episode, Walt, trying to elude a nosy doctor, comes into contact with a substance in the hospital that causes him to have a deadly allergic reaction. At the same time, Matthew is being booked into jail and needs Walt to bail him out. At the last minute, Matthew manages to save Walt as he has done many times throughout the series.

Matthew's powers during this season were mainly telekinetic, being able to move objects with the power of his mind. This power was illustrated in the opening credits as moving a book back into a slot on a bookshelf. In episodes, he used telekinesis to manipulate a football, and raise rocks that had buried an experimental Air Force flying unit and then its simulation. The opening title suggests that members of his family had other powers that probably expanded after achieving physical maturity (and with practice).

=== Second half of series ===
The series took a sudden turn from a dramatic adventure series to a by-the-book adventure series, with Walt and Matthew having to deal with government assignments. Major Wymore (James Karen) replaced General Tucker (John Crawford) and met with the Quadrians in all sorts of strange locations, where he briefed them on the missions. Gone were Pam and Bob and references to the high school. Matthew was being portrayed as older, and not much was said about their true mission, which was returning to Quadris to take back their world from the enemy.

Matthew had previously used the nickname "Shep" for his guardian, but with the sudden format change, Matthew started calling him Walt.

In the gap between episodes 12 and 13, Matthew apparently developed or perfected additional powers, including separating his intelligence into an "astral," a simulation of his current appearance that could walk through walls (as in astral projection). Another power was transmutation of objects.

=== Enemies of Quadris ===
The name of the Marauder species that attacked Quadris is unrevealed. They seem human, but tend to explode when they hit water. These "human replicants" may just be service drones working for a real enemy, an image of which may have been seen in the first pilot (when "Matthew" was "David"). Why the Marauders would invade Quadris but not Earth is not known. However, it may have to do with powers the Quadrians possess. They do seem to have incredible strength, and the Marauder in the second pilot, played by Judson Scott, mentioned someone named "Olan," who gave them chemicals to feel pleasure; the character Olan is never revealed.

== Main cast ==
- Peter Barton – Matthew Star/E'Hawke
- Louis Gossett Jr. – Walt Shepherd/D'Hai
- Amy Steel – Pamela Elliot
- Chip Frye – Bob Alexander
- Michael Fairman – Principal Heller
- John Crawford – General Tucker
- James Karen – Major Wymore

== Production credits ==
- Created by Steven E. De Souza
- Executive Producers: Daniel Wilson, Harve Bennett, and Bruce Lansbury
- Developed by Robert Earll and Allan Balter

== Episode list ==
No. overall	No. in season 1	Directed by	Written by	Original release date	Guest(s)
1	"Jackal"	Ron Satlof	Robert Earll & Allan Balter	September 17, 1982	
On the run from their enemies who have conquered their home planet, Quadris, and the US Government, Matthew Star, the crown prince, along with his guardian, Walt Shepherd, relocate and try to hide in plain sight. On his first day at his new school, Matt meets Pam. After their cover is blown, they decide to stay and fight. Guest stars: Judson Scott (Float), Maylo McCaslin (Cindy During), Adrienne Grant (Nan), Justin Mastro (Richard Lopez), Michael Fairman (Mr. Heller), Susan Ruttan (Bus Driver), Terrence Beasor (Sergeant), Jessica Hoyt (Airwoman), and Thom Ford (Student #1).
2	"Accused"	Ron Satlof	Gregory S. Dinallo	September 24, 1982	
On Earth there are people who look identical to the aliens of Quadris. Walt's duplicate murders a police officer and Walt takes the blame. It is up to Matt to prove his guardian is innocent. Guest stars: John Aprea (Howard Crawford), Carmen Argenziano (Brancato), Philip Hamilton (Man), Lynn Hamilton (Judge Condon), Stuart Pankin (Bill Chambers), Thomas Byrd (Tom), Margaret Avery (April), Fred Lerner (Bret), Chuck Hicks (Sarkis), Terry Burns (Williams), Vincent (Milana Guard #1) (as Vincent Duke Milana), Dick Durock (Smith), Jerry Martin (Ticket Agent), Ken Phillips (Engineer) (as Kenneth Phillips), and Martin Dolciamore (Operator).
3	"Daredevil"	Bruce Bilson	Jeffrey Alan Scott	October 1, 1982	
The high school is being used as the location of a horror movie and Pam is a part of the cast. Matt's old friend has a job as a stuntman on the film. Matt tries to save his friend from risking his life while taking dangerous risks. Guest stars: Bill Daily (Frank Trenton), Paul Regina (Pete), Michael Fairman (Mr. Heller), Kaz Garas (Burt Garner), Verda Bridges (Girl #1) (as Verda Marie Bridges), Ralph Steadman (Crewman), Kimberly Sands (Cheerleader #2), and Corinne Bohrer (Cheerleader).
4	"Genius"	Bob Claver	Tom Greene	October 8, 1982	
Matt must get close to nerdy classmate, Monica, after she unknowingly creates a dangerous paint that explodes in high temperatures. Guest stars: Earl Boen (Mr. Hansley), Fay DeWitt (Mrs. Kraft) (as Fay De Witt), David Wysocki (Jerry) (as David Wallace), Margaret Fitzgerald (Monica Kraft), Alan North (Mr. Kraft), Michael Fairman (Mr. Heller), Larry Carroll (Weatherman), Beans Morocco Security Guard (as Dan Barrows), Reid Cruickshanks (Construction Foreman), Ernie Fuentes (Gardener), and Randy Lowell (Computer Operator) (as Randolph Dreyfuss).
5	"Prediction"	Guy Magar	Richard Christian Matheson & Thomas Szollosi	October 15, 1982	
6	"Italian Caper"	Guy Magar	James Miller	October 29, 1982	
7	"Winning"	Ron Satlof	Gregory S. Dinallo	November 5, 1982	
8	"Endurance a.k.a. Survival"	Paul Krasny	Ruel Fischmann	November 12, 1982	
9	"The Triangle"	Leonard Nimoy	Richard Christian Matheson & Thomas Szollosi	November 19, 1982	
10	"Mother"	Ron Satlof	Walter Koenig	November 26, 1982	
11	"Experiment"	Gunnar Hellström	Richard Christian Matheson & Thomas Szollosi	December 10, 1982	
12	"Fugitives"	Jeffrey Hayden	Judy Burns	December 17, 1982	
13	"Matthew Star, D.O.A."	Leslie H. Martinson	Bruce Shelly	January 21, 1983	
14	"The Racer's Edge"	Corey Allen	Luciano Comici	January 28, 1983	
15	"Dead Man's Hand"	Vincent McEveety	David Bennett Carren	February 11, 1983	
16	"36 Hours"	Barry Crane	S : William Mageen & Gil Grant; T : David Bennett Carren	February 18, 1983	
17	"The Quadrian Caper"	Guy Magar	Bruce Shelly	February 25, 1983	
18	"Brain Drain"	Leslie H. Martinson	S : William Mageen & Gil Grant; T : George McIldowie	March 4, 1983	
19	"The Great Waldo Shepherd"	Barry Crane	S : Gil Grant & William Mageen; T : Bill Taube	March 11, 1983	
20	"Road Rebels"	Barbara Peeters	Mark Jones	March 25, 1983	
21	"Swords & Quests"	Louis Gossett Jr.	Lee Sheldon	April 8, 1983	
22	"Starr Knight"	Ivan Nagy	Steven E. de Souza	April 15, 1983	

== US TV ratings ==
Season	Episodes	Start date	End date	Nielsen rank	Nielsen rating
1982–83	22	September 17, 1982	April 15, 1983	86	N/A

== Home media ==
In 2018, Visual Entertainment Inc. (VEI) released the complete series on DVD.

In June 2020, the series began airing in reruns on MeTV.

== See also ==
- Benji, Zax and the Alien Prince
- Sym-Bionic Titan
