= Tales of Poe =

- Theatrical release poster
- Directed by: Bart Mastronardi; Alan Rowe Kelly
- Written by: Bart Mastronardi; Michael Varrati; Alan Rowe Kelly
- Produced by: Alan Rowe Kelly
- Starring: Bette Cassatt; Zoë Daelman Chlanda; Colin Cunliffe; Lesleh Donaldson; Desiree Gould; Randy Jones; Alan Rowe Kelly; Adrienne King; Brewster McCall; Debbie Rochon; Amy Steel; Caroline Williams
- Edited by: Alan Rowe Kelly
- Music by: Tom Burns
- Production companies: Mastropieces; Southpaw Pictures
- Distributed by: Wild Eye Releasing
- Release date: 2014
- Running time: 120 minutes
- Country: United States
- Language: English
- Box office: $5,527

Tales of Poe is a 2014 anthology film directed by independent filmmakers Bart Mastronardi and Alan Rowe Kelly and distributed by Wild Eye Releasing. As of February 2019, the film has grossed over $5k from video sales.

== Synopsis ==
Based on the classic works of Edgar Allan Poe, Tales of Poe is a series of three chilling stories adapted for the screen and based on Poe's "The Tell-Tale Heart", "The Cask of Amontillado", and one of his more obscure poems "Dreams". Bart Mastronardi wrote and directed his award-winning The Tell Tale Heart starring horror star Debbie Rochon and changes the genders from the original story to female in this macabre story that takes place in a mental asylum. Alan Rowe Kelly wrote, directed and stars in an updated adaptation of The Cask with co-stars Randy Jones and Brewster McCall in a love triangle gone awry in a Giallo styled film of murder, deceit and revenge. The third tale, Dreams, is directed by Bart Mastronardi from an original screenplay by Michael Varrati. Dreams focuses on the surreal and trippy journey of a young woman (Bette Cassatt) trapped between the worlds of life and death from her hospital bed. Other key players in Tales of Poe are genre staples Adrienne King, Amy Steel, Caroline Williams, Andrew Glaszek, Jerry Murdock, Susan Adriensen, Zoë Daelman Chlanda, Cartier Williams, Douglas Rowan, Amy Lynn Best, Carl Burrows, Haley Turner, Lesleh Donaldson, Desiree Gould, Joe Quick, David Marancik, Mike Watt, Tom Lanier and Michael Varrati.

== Cast ==
- Amy Steel as Mother of Dreams/Poetic Narrator
- Adrienne King as Queen of Dreams/Private Nurse
- Caroline Williams as Angel of Dreams
- Debbie Rochon as The Narrator
- Randy Jones as Fortunato Montresor
- Desiree Gould as Nurse Malliard
- Alan Rowe Kelly as Peggy Lamar/Gogo Montresor
- Bette Cassatt as The Dreamer
- Zoë Daelman Chlanda as Sarah Whitman
- Colin Cunliffe as The Suitor
- Lesleh Donaldson as Evelyn Dyck/Woman in Black
- Brewster McCall as Marco Lechresi/Demon of Dreams
- Joe Zaso as Gravedigger
- Michael Varrati as Dr. Tarr

== Awards ==
- Best Actress Debbie Rochon, Best Short Bart Mastronardi, Best Editing Alan Rowe Kelly for The Tell Tale Heart at 2011 Buffalo Screams Horror Film Festival
- Best Actress Debbie Rochon, Best Actor Alan Rowe Kelly, Audience Choice Bart Mastronardi for The Tell Tale Heart at 2012 Macabre Faire Film Festival

== Release ==
The film was released on DVD and Digital HD on October 11, 2016.
