= For All Time =

- Genre: Drama; Sci-Fi
- Based on: "A Stop at Willoughby" by Rod Serling
- Written by: Vivienne Radkoff
- Directed by: Steven Schachter
- Starring: Mark Harmon; Mary McDonnell; Catherine Hicks
- Music by: Mader
- Country of origin: United States
- Original language: English

Production
- Executive producer: David A. Rosemont
- Producer: Susan Zachary
- Cinematography: Edward J. Pei
- Editor: Paul Dixon
- Running time: 84 minutes
- Production company: Rosemont Productions International

Original release
- Network: CBS
- Release: October 18, 2000

For All Time is a 2000 American television science fiction drama film starring Mark Harmon, Mary McDonnell, and Catherine Hicks. It was based on The Twilight Zone episode "A Stop at Willoughby" written by Rod Serling. The teleplay was by Vivienne Radkoff and it was directed by Steven Schachter. The film aired on CBS on October 18, 2000.

As of December 2025, the movie is available to stream on YouTube.

== Plot summary ==
Charles Lattimer is an everyday man facing middle age and a marriage to Kristen coming to an end. He stumbles across a time slip that occurs on one of his regular train rides, as the train goes through a tunnel. Coming across an antique watch, he learns it allows him to get off the train during the time slip, whereupon he finds himself back in the 1890s. Before long he finds a new love, and a new purpose there. The watch gets broken and complications occur when the portal back to the past starts to close, leading him to a decision that could leave him stranded out of his own time.

== Cast ==
- Mark Harmon as Charles Lattimer
- Mary McDonnell as Laura Brown
- Catherine Hicks as Kristen
- Philip Casnoff as Al Glasser
- Bill Cobbs as Proprietor / Conductor
- Brittany Tiplady as Mary Brown
- Ed Evanko as Marshall Latham

== Awards and nominations ==
Nominated for the Golden Reel Award in 2001.

- Best Sound Editing - Television Movies and Specials (including Mini-Series) - Music
- Best Sound Editing - Television Movies and Specials - Effects & Foley
