= Shea Farrell =

American actor and producer

- Born: Edward Leo Farrell III; October 21, 1957 (age 68); Cornwall, New York, U.S.
- Occupations: Actor, producer
- Years active: 1982–present
- Spouse(s): Ronda Pierson (1982–90; divorced); Kristena Farrell (1991–99; divorced); 2 children

Edward Leo "Shea" Farrell III is an American actor and producer best known for playing Mark Danning in Aaron Spelling's series, Hotel.

Shea Farrell was born October 21, 1957, in Cornwall, New York, to Edward Leo, Jr. and Mary Rose (née Drummey) Farrell. He attended Portsmouth Abbey School in Portsmouth, Rhode Island. He originally planned to be a professional football player.

Shea switched from acting to production work in 1997. He worked on The Practice, Ally McBeal, Boston Public and Boston Legal, all produced by David E. Kelley. He now works in films and on television as an assistant director and unit production manager. He has been a Unit Production Manager at Sony Entertainment's New Media Division/Crackle.com since 2008.

== Filmography ==
=== As actor ===
- 1982: Capitol (Television series): Matt McCandless No. 1 (1982) (original cast)
- 1983: Hotel (TV): Mark Danning
- 1984 "The Love Boat" S8 E13 as Noel Kane in the Christmas-themed vignette "Noel's Christmas Carol"
- 1987: The Law and Harry McGraw (TV series): Steve Lacey (1987–1988)
- 1989: Major League: Tolbert
- 1990: Back to Hannibal: The Return of Tom Sawyer and Huckleberry Finn (TV): Lyle Newman
- 1993: The Untouchables (TV series): Agent Sean Quinlan (1994)
- 1995: While You Were Sleeping: Ashley's Husband
- 1995: Murder, She Wrote: Reed Harding
- 1995: Mord ist ihr (Staffel 12, Episode 11)
- 1996: Deadly Charades: Guy Sharp
- 1996: Same River Twice: Stan
- 1996: Mr. Wrong: James
- 1998: Tycus (video game): Lt. Garrison
- 1999: Valerie Flake: Thrusting Guy
- 2006: Where There's a Will (TV): Older Doctor

=== As producer ===
- 1998: Ally McBeal
- 2009: Phil Cobb's Dinner for Four (post-production)
