= The Butterfly Room =

- Directed by: Jonathan Zarantonello
- Starring: Barbara Steele; Ray Wise; Erica Leerhsen; Heather Langenkamp
- Music by: Pivio and Aldo De Scalzi
- Release date: 2012
- Countries: United States; Italy
- Language: English
- Box office: $698,253

The Butterfly Room is a 2012 American-Italian thriller-horror film directed by Jonathan Zarantonello. It is based on Zarantonello's novel Alice dalle 4 alle 5 (Alice from 4 to 5). The film won the Denis-de-Rougemont Youth Award at the 2012 Neuchâtel International Fantastic Film Festival. The storyline revolves around Ann (Barbara Steele), a reclusive and butterfly-obsessed elderly lady who develops a disturbing relationship with a mysterious young girl, years after destroying the relationship with her daughter Dorothy (Heather Langenkamp). Ray Wise, Adrienne King, Camille Keaton, and P.J. Soles also make appearances, as well as James Karen in his final film role; Karen died six years after the film's release.

== Plot ==
The film centers around Ann, an introverted unfriendly woman who lives in an apartment building with her neighbour, a single mother named Claudia and her daughter Julie. Ann has an obsession with pinning butterflies and has a room in her apartment devoted to it. At the beginning of the film, Ann walks past a workman balancing dangerously on a ladder whilst trimming a tree. She kicks the ladder out from beneath him. The workman's boss, Nick, runs out and apologises - having not seen that Ann was responsible. Julie has been locked out by her irresponsible mother. Ann invites her inside her apartment to pass the time until her mother arrives home.

Julie's mother, Claudia arrives home and invites Ann to dinner to thank her for looking after Julie. The workman arrives at Ann's house to apologise and do some repairs. He explains that he thought she may have kicked his ladder because he had previously seen her scolding a young girl in the corridor of the apartment building. Ann says she had not noticed he was there. Ann asks if he could quickly help her move something in the butterfly room. Just as the door opens she lunges from the corner and sprays him in the face with acid she bought from the taxidermy shop.

This is followed by a flashback sequence, the first being the scene where she scolds the young girl. We then see a time decal of the month previous where she meets the girl in a mall. She sees the girl by herself crying and goes over to check on her. The girl, whose name is Alice, explains that the money she had been given to buy a doll has been stolen. Ann pities Alice and buys her a doll. Alice asks for Ann's address and says she will repay her later. As she walks away, Alice throws the doll in a trashcan. The film then flashes forward to Alice visiting Ann. She gives Ann a portrait she drew of her, Ann returns the gesture by gifting a pinned blue butterfly. Alice sees a handmade ornament with Dorothy inscribed on it. Ann explains that Dorothy is her deceased daughter. Alice looks around the apartment and sees that there are some French books on Ann's shelf. When she leaves, Alice asks Ann if she can keep the money she was supposed to repay her for the doll and explains her mother is disabled. Ann agrees to give Alice the money and offers to tutor Alice in French. Alice agrees to come back.

Ann enters a rundown apartment block. Ann picks up a blue framed butterfly, showing that the apartment is where Alice lives. Ann packs some of Alice's clothes and leaves. In the elevator, Ann hits the emergency stop button and opens a small trap door. There is a body underneath the lift. Ann appears to be preserving the body. Someone then calls the lift, Ann panics and drops the carpet over the open trapdoor. Later Ann has dinner with Claudia and Julie. When Julie goes to bed, Claudia discusses her relationship with her "office manager" and announces her pregnancy to Ann. She then ask Ann to watch Julie over the weekend. In a flashback sequence, Ann discovers Alice with another woman at the mall. She then discovers the doll she bought for her on display in a store. Back in the present, Nick asks Ann if she has seen the workman who went to her apartment and she says she had to ask him to leave because of how rude he was. When Ann is standing outside the school, she starts talking to a boy named William. A woman then yells at Ann to stay away from her son.

Ann is shown stalking Alice in a flashback scene. The girl is on her way to accompany another lonely woman named Olga. Ann then goes to Alice's apartment and meets her mother pretending to be Olga. Her mother is revealed to be a prostitute who pretends to be one-legged for the special desires of her "Devotee" customers, customers who prefer women missing limbs. She leaves because she is on her way to a client and gives her the key to the apartment. Ann then proceeds to push the woman down the elevator that stopped in between floors, killing her. In the present day, Nick is fixing Ann's window before he confronts her about demolishing the wall in her apartment. He then offers to have workers tear down the wall for her illegally for money after he moves a dresser in front of the butterfly room for her. Ann, after seeing Alice with Olga, follows them into the bathroom. Ann then kills Olga.

As Ann is talking to Julie in the present day, she is confronted by Dorothy, the mother of William, outside of her apartment. Dorothy states that she will not let Ann harm Julie because she knows what Ann is capable of. It is revealed that Dorothy is Ann's estranged daughter. The next day Claudia talks about the abortion she plans to have which upsets Ann. Claudia then enters the butterfly room to get Julie. As Claudia picks Julie up from school, Dorothy warns her of Ann. She reveals that Ann almost drowned her as a child, traumatizing her. Dorothy then gives Claudia her phone number in case something happens. Claudia then confronts Ann telling her to leave her daughter alone. She then pushes Ann down and as she is leaving, Ann kills her. As Julie is looking for her mother in Ann's apartment, she discovers a disfigured corpse of a man before finding Alice's corpse in the butterfly room. Julie accidentally redials Dorothy's number who hears Ann taunting Julie. Dorothy hits Ann with her car as she chases Julie onto the street. The film ends with Julie celebrating her birthday. She was adopted by Dorothy. When William yells at his mother, Dorothy stares off into the camera.

== Cast ==
- Barbara Steele as Ann
- Ray Wise as Nick
- Erica Leerhsen as Claudia
- Heather Langenkamp as Dorothy
- Camille Keaton as Olga
- Adrienne King as Rachel
- P. J. Soles as Lauren
- Ellery Sprayberry as Julie
- Julia Putnam as Alice
- Elea Oberon as Monika (as Emma Bering)
- James Karen as Sales Clerk

== Production ==
Langenkamp was approached to play the role of Dorothy while attending a horror convention when Zarantonello gave her a script for the film. Impressed after reading it, she ultimately signed on to the film and described shooting it as a positive experience. In an interview with Dread Central, when asked about the conception of the film Zarantonello stated:

"Well, the idea [for the movie] was to portray a mother and to make it as universal as possible. For example, there is a line in the movie that says, 'It was so much better when you were younger; you were so much cuter when you were a kid.' And this is a line that Barbara says and that all the ladies in the movie say. So the idea was to portray, definitely, a killer as an unusual character but with some traits that may be common to mothers in general. And, as a matter of fact, at the end, when there’s the close-up with Heather and her daughter, yeah, of course she may have inherited something from her mother. She says the same line even when she touches the hair of her son, Matthew, 'You were so much cuter when you were younger.' So, once again, the same line… I was hoping that they would show us that motherhood sometimes cannot be that sweet and kind thing that we’re all used to, especially in the movies."

== Reception ==
The film has been met with generally mixed reviews. While film critic Kim Newman of Screen Daily criticized the film for delving into areas of camp which he found to undercut the effect of horror, Newman praised both the performances of Langenkamp and Putnam.

Staci Layne Wilson of Dread Central stated, "Directed deftly on a little budget but with big love by Jonathan Zarantonello, The Butterfly Room succeeds as a slow-burn and moody psychological thriller reminiscent of the best of the 1970s (though it is not a giallo, in spite of some of the press’ fervent wishes). The fact it is shot on location in beautiful, historic Los Angeles only adds to the atmosphere and authenticity."

Frank Scheck of The Hollywood Reporter gave a much more mixed review saying, "The Butterfly Room is too ineptly executed to make it little more than a camp curiosity. Despite its plethora of would-be shocking moments, the film provides little in the way of genuine scares, although director Zarantonello does provide a visually effective climax. Suffice it to say that Ann’s collection includes something more than winged insects."
