= James Daly (actor) =

American actor (1918–1978)

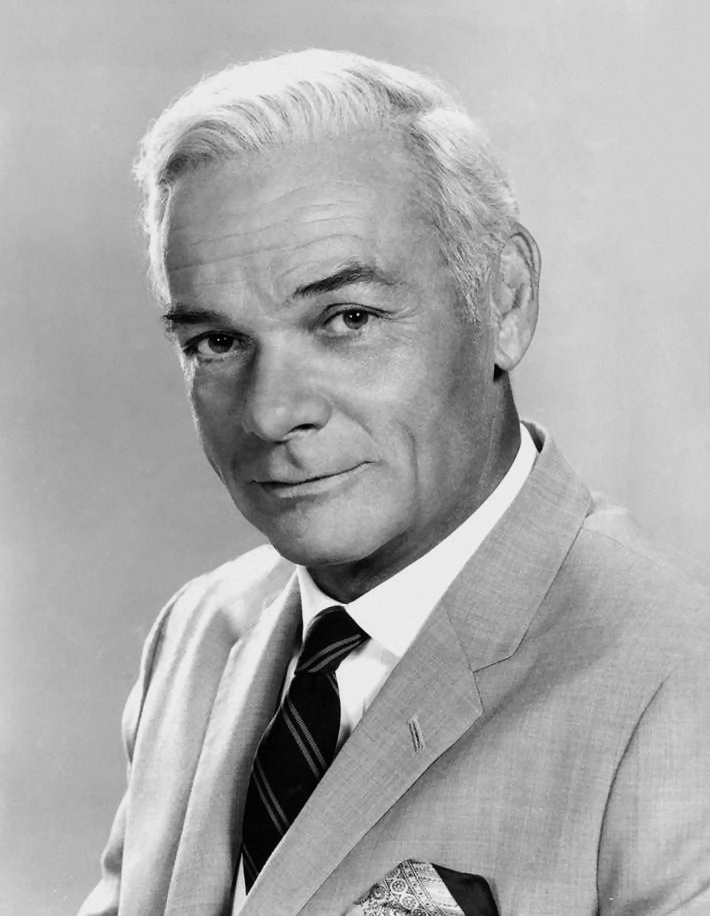
- Daly in Medical Center, 1975
- Born: James Firman Daly; October 23, 1918; Wisconsin Rapids, Wisconsin, U.S.
- Died: July 3, 1978 (aged 59); Nyack, New York, U.S.
- Education: Cornell College
- Occupation: Actor
- Years active: 1946–1978
- Television: Medical Center, Twelve O'Clock High
- Spouse: Hope Newell (m. 1942; div. 1965)
- Children: 4, including Tyne and Tim Daly
- Relatives: Sam Daly (grandson)

James Firman Daly (October 23, 1918 – July 3, 1978) was an American actor. Recognized for his work on stage and screen, he is perhaps best known for his role as Paul Lochner in the hospital drama series Medical Center, in which he played Chad Everett's superior.

== Early life ==
Daly was born in Wisconsin Rapids in Wood County in central Wisconsin, to Dorothy Ethelbert (Hogan) Mullen, who later worked for the Central Intelligence Agency, and Percifer Charles Daly, a fuel merchant. During the 1930s, Daly studied drama and acted in shows before serving in three branches of the armed forces, including six months as an infantryman in the U.S. Army, two months as a cadet in the Army Air Corps, and more than four years in the Navy as an ensign during World War II.

Daly attended the University of Wisconsin, Iowa State University, and Carroll College before receiving a degree from Cornell College in Mount Vernon, Iowa. Cornell College later presented him with an honorary Doctor of Fine Arts degree.

== Career ==
Daly was an accomplished stage actor, starting out in 1946 as Gary Merrill's understudy in Born Yesterday. His starring roles on Broadway included Archibald MacLeish's Pulitzer Prize–winning J.B. and Tennessee Williams' Period of Adjustment.

Between 1953 and 1954, Daly appeared in the third season of Foreign Intrigue as the main character Michael Powers.

He guest-starred on many television series, including Appointment with Adventure (two episodes), Breaking Point, Mission: Impossible ("Shock"), DuPont Cavalcade Theater ("One Day at a Time" 1955) portraying Bill Wilson the co-founder of Alcoholics Anonymous, The Twilight Zone ("A Stop at Willoughby"), The Tenderfoot (1964) for Walt Disney's Wonderful World of Color, The Road West (1966 episode "The Gunfighter"), Custer, Gunsmoke (1967 episode "The Favor"), Combat!, The Fugitive, The Virginian, and Twelve O'Clock High. He portrayed Mr. Flint (an apparently immortal human) in the Star Trek episode "Requiem for Methuselah" (1969).

In 1968, he appeared in the movie Planet of the Apes. He was a series regular on Medical Center on CBS between 1969 and 1976 portraying Dr. Paul Lochner.

In 1958, Daly signed a contract with the R.J. Reynolds Tobacco Company to do television commercials for Camel cigarettes. He served as the Camel representative for seven years, being flown by Reynolds throughout the United States to be filmed smoking a Camel cigarette at various locations.

In addition to his acting career, Daly was one of the hosts on NBC Radio's weekend Monitor program in 1963–1964.

Daly's last screen role was as Mr. Boyce in the mini-series Roots: The Next Generations.

== Personal life ==
Two of Daly's children, Tyne Daly and Tim Daly, and his grandson, Sam Daly, are actors. Tyne appeared on Daly's TV series, Foreign Intrigue, as a child. She also played Jennifer Lochner, Paul Lochner's adult daughter, on Medical Center in the 1970 season one episode "Moment of Decision". The elder Daly and his daughter both guest-starred separately in the original Mission: Impossible TV series. Tim appeared as a child with his father in Henrik Ibsen's play An Enemy of the People. Daly had two other children: daughters Mary Glynn and Pegeen Michael.

According to his son Tim Daly, during an interview on CBS News Sunday Morning, James Daly came out to Tim as gay a decade after divorcing his wife Hope. His struggle to come to terms with his sexual orientation nearly put a rift between him and his family. As homosexuality was still considered a mental illness until the early 1970s, he and his wife tried and failed at "curing" him. After their divorce, Daly decided to limit his contact with his children out of fear that they would end up mentally ill themselves.

== Death ==
Daly died on July 3, 1978, of heart failure in Nyack, New York, two years after Medical Center ended, and while he was preparing to star in the play Equus in Tarrytown, New York. His ashes were scattered into the Atlantic Ocean.

== Selected acting credits ==
=== Film ===
Year	Title	Role	Notes
1950	The Sleeping City	Interne	Uncredited
1955	The Court-Martial of Billy Mitchell	Lt. Col. Herbert White	
1957	The Young Stranger	Thomas 'Tom' Ditmar	
1960	I Aim at the Stars	U.S. Major William Taggert	
1968	Planet of the Apes	Honorius	
1968	Code Name: Red Roses	Major Mike Liston	
1969	The Big Bounce	Ray Ritchie	
1969	The Five Man Army	Augustus	
1971	The Resurrection of Zachary Wheeler	Dr. Redding	
1972	Wild in the Sky	The President	

=== Television ===
Year	Title	Role	Notes
1953-1954	Foreign Intrigue	Michael Powers	Season 3, main role
1954	Westinghouse Studio One	Major Gaylord	Episode: "The Strike"
1955	DuPont Cavalcade Theater	Bill Wilson	Episode: "One Day at a Time"
1955-1957	Omnibus	General Robert E. Lee	Episodes: "Henry Adams", "Uncle Tom's Cabin", "The Birth of Modern Times", "The Court Martial of Billy Mitchell", "TV/Radio Workshop of the Ford Foundation", "The Fine Art of Murder" and "Lee at Gettysburg"
1960	The Twilight Zone	Gart Williams	Episode: "A Stop at Willoughby"
1961–1967	Hallmark Hall of Fame	Barabbas, Owen Wister, Dr. O'Meara, and Dunois	Episodes: "Give Us Barabbas", "The Magnificent Yankee", "Eagle in a Cage" and "Saint Joan"; Primetime Emmy Award for Outstanding Performance by an Actor in a Supporting Role in a Drama for "Eagle in a Cage" (1966)
1965	Dr. Kildare	Morgan Bannion	Episodes: "With Hellfire and Thunder" and "Daily Flights to Olympus"
1966	An Enemy of the People	Dr. Thomas Stockmann	American Playhouse production
1966	The Fugitive	Michael Ballinger and Arthur Brame	Episodes: "Running Scared" and "The Evil Men Do"
1967	Mission: Impossible	Carl Wilson / Josef Gort	Episode: "Shock"
1967	Combat!	Capt. Cole	Episode: "Encounter"
1967	Mission: Impossible	Alfred Belzig	Episode: "The Bank"
1967	The Invaders	Alan Landers	Episode: "Beachhead"
1968	The Invaders	General Samuel ConCannon	Episodes: "The Peacemaker"
1969	Star Trek	Flint	Episode: "Requiem for Methuselah"
1969–1976	Medical Center	Dr. Paul Lochner	Series regular
1970	Ironside	Judge McIntire	Episode: "People Against Judge McIntire"

=== Theatre ===
Year	Production	Role	Notes
1946–1949	Born Yesterday		as Replacement and/or Understudy
1947	Virginia Reel	Hobe Kelvin	
1949	Man and Superman	Hector Malone, Jr.	
1951	Billy Budd	Talbot	
1951	Mary Rose	Harry	
1951–1952	Saint Joan	Robert de Baudricourt	
1953	The Merchant of Venice	Gratiano	
1956	Miss Julie / The Stronger	Jean	Off-Broadway
1958	Handful of Fire	Manuel	
1958–1959	J.B.		as Replacement
1960–1961	Period of Adjustment	Ralph Bates	
1963	The Advocate	Warren Curtis	
1963	Jenny Kissed Me by Jean Kerr "Who's Afraid of Virginia Woolf?" Co-starring with Colleen Dewhurst 1965		Performances: Bucks County Playhouse and New Hope, Pennsylvania
1964	The White House	George Washington, James Monroe, Martin Van Buren, William Henry Harrison, James Buchanan, Andrew Johnson, Grover Cleveland, and Theodore Roosevelt	

== Awards and nominations ==
Year	Award	Category	Nominated work	Result	Ref.
1966	Primetime Emmy Awards	Outstanding Performance by an Actor in a Supporting Role in a Drama	Hallmark Hall of Fame (Episode: "Eagle in a Cage")	Won	
1951	Theatre World Awards	—N/a	Major Barbara	Won	
