= Women of San Quentin =

- Genre: Drama
- Written by: Larry Cohen
- Screenplay by: Mark Rodgers
- Story by: Mark Rodgers
- Directed by: William A. Graham
- Starring: Stella Stevens; Debbie Allen; Hector Elizondo; Amy Steel; Rosanna DeSoto
- Theme music composer: John Cacavas
- Country of origin: United States
- Original language: English

Production
- Executive producer: David Gerber
- Producers: Stephen Cragg; R. W. Goodwin
- Production location: Canon City, Colorado
- Cinematography: Robert Steadman
- Editor: Ronald J. Fagan
- Running time: 100 minutes
- Production companies: David Gerber Productions; MGM/UA Television

Original release
- Network: NBC
- Release: October 23, 1983

Women of San Quentin is a 1983 TV movie about female prison guards at San Quentin Prison. It was directed by William A. Graham and stars Stella Stevens and Debbie Allen.

It was based on a story by Larry Cohen. He had gone to San Quentin to research a different project and was intrigued by finding a female guard there. He sold it to television but says it was rewritten and changed from the story he originally conceived.

== Premise ==
A young female prison guard finds out her first assignment is to San Quentin, one of the toughest prisons in the country.

== Cast ==
- Stella Stevens as Lieutenant Janet Alexander
- Debbie Allen as Carol Freeman
- Hector Elizondo as Captain Mike Reyes
- Amy Steel as Liz Larson
- Rosanna DeSoto as Adela Reynoso
- Gregg Henry as Williams
- William Allen Young as Larry Jennings
- Yaphet Kotto as Sergeant Therman Patterson
- Rockne Tarkington as William "Big William"
- James Gammon as Officer
- Ernie Hudson as Charles Wilson
- William Sanderson as "Countee"
- Marco Rodriguez as Ray Ortiz
- Tracee Lyles as Marion
- Jenny Gago as Gloria
- Ahmed Nurradin as Anthony DeHaven
- Bob Minor as J.W. Powers
