= Tycus =

- Directed by: John Putch
- Screenplay by: Kevin Goetz; Michael Goetz
- Produced by: Ashok Amritraj; Andrew Stevens
- Starring: Dennis Hopper; Peter Onorati; Finola Hughes; Chick Vennera
- Cinematography: Ross Berryman
- Edited by: David Lloyd
- Music by: Alexander Baker; Clair Marlo
- Production company: Paramount Home Entertainment
- Distributed by: Phoenician Entertainment
- Release date: August 8, 1998 (United States)
- Running time: 94 minutes
- Country: United States
- Language: English

Tycus is a 1998 American science fiction drama film directed by John Putch and starring Dennis Hopper, Peter Onorati, Finola Hughes, Chick Vennera and Amy Steel. It was released direct-to-video in 1999, in the United Kingdom, France, United States and other western countries.

== Plot summary ==
In 1989, astronomer Dr. Peter Crawford discovers a comet on a collision with Earth. He reports his findings to the council, but they refuse to listen to him. Ten years later the comet, now called Tycus, is rapidly closing on the Earth. But Tycus is not on a collision course with the Earth; Tycus is going to impact the moon. If Tycus does impact the moon, it will be shattered and the fragments will be pulled in by Earth's gravity.

Dr. Crawford begins the construction of a vast city located under the Sierra Mountains. His city would provide a safe haven for a few people who would become the beginning of the new age after the catastrophe. A young reporter, Jake Lowe, is investigating the building site when he finds out that only a few people get to inhabit the city. So he requests to Dr. Crawford that he and his pregnant wife be allowed entrance into the city because he discovered the city's existence. Dr. Crawford agrees as he also wants his wife and daughter in the city. At the same time, a nuclear missile fails to do anything to stop Tycus.

They plan to fly Crawford's jet to Los Angeles, now in a state of chaos as news of the comet is made public. Jake finds his wife and gets her to the rendezvous point. Unfortunately, someone has already taken the jet so Jake, his wife, and Crawford's family use a pick-up truck to reach the city. Tycus then smashes into the moon, shattering it.

As the fragments approach, Crawford's group sees a group of people desperately waiting for the doors to the city to open. Crawford activates the elevator and walks towards the door. After they all entered the elevator, Crawford is grabbed by the group of people and he is forced to stay behind. The elevator descends into the underground city.

The debris starts to rain down to Earth. The fragments obliterate every major city in the world, cause massive disasters like tsunamis, and much of the human race is wiped out.

In the year 2029, after the Earth has recovered from the disaster, a young woman, implied to be Jake's daughter, tells a group of people sitting in the Sierra Mountains of an ancient world where highways and buildings covered the Earth's surface; she tells of Dr. Crawford, who first discovered the little dot in the sky and how that little dot would lead to the downfall of mankind. As the story continues, She tells of how thousands of moons reminds the survivors of the New Age and we are shown that the pieces left of the moon have formed an asteroid belt around the Earth.

== Cast ==
- Dennis Hopper as Dr. Peter Crawford
- Peter Onorati as Jake Lowe
- Finola Hughes as Amy Lowe
- Chick Vennera as Chick Vennera
- Blake Clark as Commander Scott
- Art LaFleur as Shyler
- Bert Remsen as Randall Barnett
- Robert Romanus as Sam
- Shea Farrell as Lieutenant Garrison
- Elyssa Davalos as Crying Woman
- Eric Stromer as Phillers
- Tommy Hinkley as Pilot
- Amy Steel as Mother
- Dean Scofield as Studious Man
- John Putch as Amtorg Driver
