= I'll Bury You Tomorrow =

- I'll Bury You Tomorrow DVD cover
- Directed by: Alan Rowe Kelly
- Written by: Alan Rowe Kelly
- Produced by: Anthony Ancona; Tom Cadawas; Alan Rowe Kelly; Gary and Jack Malick
- Starring: Zoë Daelman Chlanda; Bill Corry; Katherine O'Sullivan
- Cinematography: Tom Cadawas; Gary Malick
- Edited by: Harry Douglas; Jack Malick
- Music by: Tom Burns
- Production company: Heretic Films
- Release dates: June 17, 2002 (Garrett Mountain Reservation, West Paterson, New Jersey)
- Running time: 119 minutes
- Country: United States

I'll Bury You Tomorrow is a 2002 low-budget independent horror film written and directed by Alan Rowe Kelly produced by New Millennium Pictures, starring Zoë Daelman Chlanda, Bill Corry, and Katherine O'Sullivan. The film premiered in West Paterson, New Jersey on June 17, 2002 and was released in DVD format on January 31, 2006.

I'll Bury You Tomorrow was filmed at Garrett Mountain Reservation in West Paterson, New Jersey.

== Plot ==
Dolores Finley (Zoë Daelman Chlanda) is a deranged young woman that appears suddenly and asks to work at Beech's Funeral Home, the local mortuary for the dying rural town of Port Oram. The Beechs find her work and Dolores begins her job, but soon shows that she is a necrophiliac. However Nettie Beech (Katherine O'Sullivan) sees her dead daughter in Dolores and opts to try to keep her around at all costs.

== Cast ==
- Zoë Daelman Chlanda as Dolores Finley
- Bill Corry as Percival Beech
- Katherine O'Sullivan as Nettie Beech
- Jerry Murdock as Jake Geraldi
- Kristen Overdurf as Ellen Gallagher
- Renee West as Tina Clark
- Alan Rowe Kelly as Corey Nichols
- P.J. Mehaffey as Eddie Gallagher
- Michael Valentino as Train station attendant
- Tina Kay as Mrs. Clark
- Sandra Schaller as Sandra Clark
- Karenann Sinocchi as Edwina Wilkes
- Austin Sears as Dr. Gross
- Rick Zahn as Client / Lt. Scallpone
- Mia Demarco as Shana, the stripper

== Reception and legacy ==
Critical reception has been polarized. Bloody Disgusting gave I'll Bury You Tomorrow three and a half skulls, calling the film "a fun and fierce look back at what was right about horror in the seventies". The review from DVD Verdict was more negative and they stated that they "really tried to like" the film but that "it is deficient in too many areas". JoBlo's Arrow in the Head reviewer also panned the film overall, criticizing it for being "painfully executed" and that it was "the cinematic equivalent of a cheese-grater to the nuts".

The film was mentioned in relation to a court case related to necrophilia, where one of the defendants stated that he had wanted to recreate one of the film's scenes where the main character was dancing with a corpse.
