= A Stop at Willoughby =

- The Twilight Zone episode
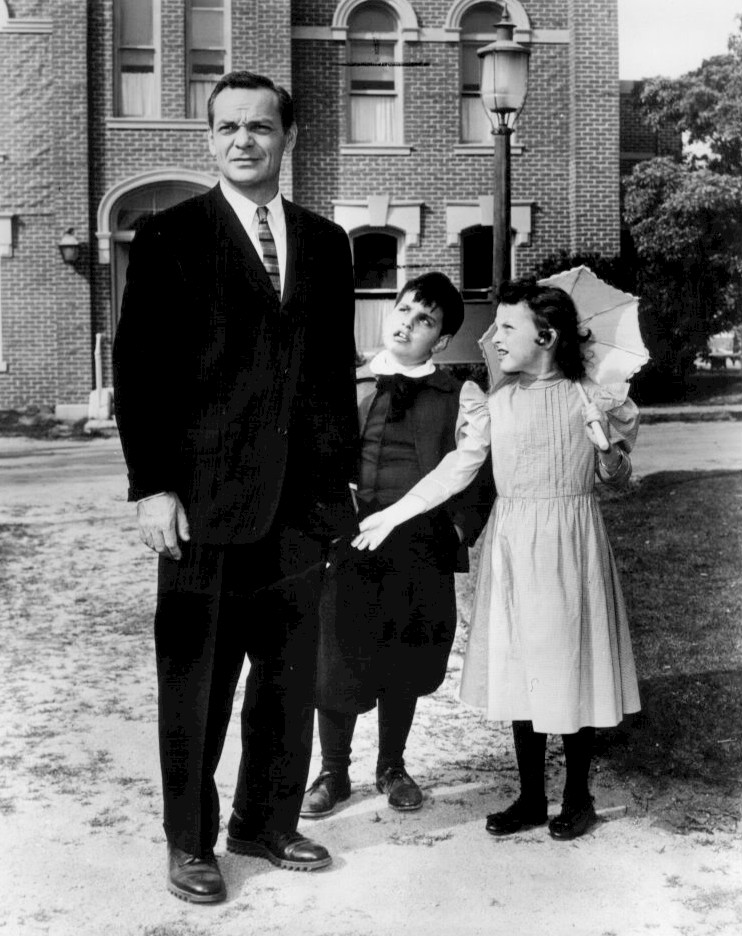
- James Daly in "A Stop at Willoughby"
- Episode no.: Season 1 Episode 30
- Directed by: Robert Parrish
- Written by: Rod Serling
- Production code: 173-3629
- Original air date: May 6, 1960

Guest appearances
- James Daly as Gart Williams; Howard Smith as Oliver Misrell; Patricia Donahue as Jane Williams; Jason Wingreen as Train conductor; Mavis Neal Palmer as Helen; James Maloney as 1888 Conductor; Billy Booth as Short Boy; Ryan Hayes as Engineer

Episode chronology
← Previous "Nightmare as a Child"	Next → "The Chaser"
- The Twilight Zone (1959 TV series, season 1)

"A Stop at Willoughby" is episode 30 of the American television anthology series The Twilight Zone. Rod Serling cited this as his favorite story from the first season of the series.

== Opening narration ==
This is Gart Williams, age 38, a man protected by a suit of armor all held together by one bolt. Just a moment ago, someone removed the bolt, and Mr. Williams' protection fell away from him, and left him a naked target. He's been cannonaded this afternoon by all the enemies of his life. His insecurity has shelled him, his sensitivity has straddled him with humiliation, his deep-rooted disquiet about his own worth has zeroed in on him, landed on target, and blown him apart. Mr. Gart Williams, ad agency exec, who in just a moment, will move into the Twilight Zone—in a desperate search for survival.

== Plot ==
1960 advertising executive Gart Williams is exasperated with his career. His overbearing boss lectures him about the "push-push-push" nature of the business. Williams dozes off on the train during his daily commute.

He wakes to find he is now alone in a stationary 19th-century railway car on a bright summer day instead of a snowy November evening. Looking out the window, he discovers that the train is in a town called Willoughby, and it is July 1888. He learns that this is a "peaceful, restful town, where a man can slow down to a walk and live his life full measure." Jerked awake into the real world, he asks the conductor about Willoughby; the conductor replies that there has never been such a station.

At home he drinks and explains to his wife that he has come to a breaking point with his career and life. She stops him and asks if he has wrecked his career. He tells her about his dream of Willoughby but she bemoans her "miserable tragic error" to have married such a man.

Williams again dozes off on the train and returns to Willoughby. As he is about to get off the train carrying his briefcase, the train begins to roll, returning him to the present. He promises himself to get off at Willoughby next time.

Experiencing a breakdown at work he calls his wife for help, but she dismisses him as hysterical. He again dozes on the train and finds himself in Willoughby. As the conductor warmly beckons him, Williams intentionally leaves his briefcase as he disembarks. The inhabitants welcome him by name and he tells them he is glad to be there and will join their idyllic life.

The swinging pendulum of the station clock fades into the swinging lantern of a railroad engineer, standing over Williams' body. The 1960 conductor explains that Williams "shouted something about Willoughby", before jumping from the train to his death. Williams' body is loaded onto a hearse, the back door of which closes to reveal the name of the funeral home: Willoughby & Son.

== Closing narration ==
Willoughby? Maybe it's wishful thinking nestled in a hidden part of a man's mind, or maybe it's the last stop in the vast design of things—or perhaps, for a man like Mr. Gart Williams, who climbed on a world that went by too fast, it's a place around the bend where he could jump off. Willoughby? Whatever it is, it comes with sunlight and serenity, and is a part of The Twilight Zone.

== Production notes ==
The "Stamford" and "Westport/Saugatuck" stops called out by the conductor in the episode do exist: the New Haven Railroad) stopped at the Stamford station and the Westport & Saugatuck station, both in Connecticut; Rod Serling once lived in Westport.

"Beautiful Dreamer", a song first published in 1864 and still popular in the 1880s and beyond, can be heard being played by a band. "Oh! Susanna", published in 1848 and among the most popular American songs ever written, is also heard.

== Reception ==
R. L. Stine cited "A Stop at Willoughby" as his favorite episode of The Twilight Zone.

== In popular culture ==
Willoughby, Ohio, calls its annual neighborhood festival "Last Stop: Willoughby" in honor of the episode.

The 2000 TV movie For All Time, was based on this episode.

In North Conway, New Hampshire, a memorial brick is inscribed "Next Stop Willoughby!" (https://rodserling.com/bonnie-weinsteins-tribute-to-rod-serling/)

Matthew Weiner, creator of the TV series Mad Men, acknowledged the influence of The Twilight Zone on his work, and how Don Draper's life had many superficial similarities to the main character of this episode. Weiner said they also paid homage to the episode in The Sopranos, when Tony Soprano leaves behind his life in his briefcase.

In the TV series The Marvelous Mrs. Maisel, Abe Weissman describes the Willoughby episode to his wife and daughter as they tour Midge's apartment.

In the 2016 Richard Linklater film Everybody Wants Some!!, the college-age character played by Wyatt Russell is named "Willoughby". He is revealed to be a 30-year-old man who has refused to grow up and who continues to travel the country trying to play for college baseball teams. Willoughby has a nearly complete collection of Twilight Zone episodes on tape and reveals that he knows almost all of them by heart, citing the name and episode number of "Eye of the Beholder" to another character.

== See also ==
- List of The Twilight Zone (1959 TV series) episodes

== Works cited ==
- Roberts, Joe (May 3, 2025). "R.L. Stine's Favorite Twilight Zone Episode Is A Classic". /Film. Archived from the original on May 6, 2025.
