= Necromancy (film) =

1972 horror film directed by Bert I. Gordon

- Directed by: Bert I. Gordon
- Written by: Bert I. Gordon; Gail March
- Produced by: Sidney L. Caplan; Gail March; Jeffrey M. Sneller
- Starring: Orson Welles; Pamela Franklin
- Cinematography: Winton C. Hoch
- Edited by: John B. Woelz
- Music by: Fred Karger; Robert J. Walsh
- Distributed by: Cinerama Releasing Corporation
- Release dates: September 20, 1972 (Detroit, Michigan); October 18, 1972 (Philadelphia)
- Running time: 83 minutes
- Country: United States
- Language: English

Necromancy (stylized as NEC'RO•MAN'CY) is a 1972 American supernatural horror film directed by Bert I. Gordon and starring Orson Welles, Pamela Franklin, Michael Ontkean, and Lee Purcell. The plot follows Cato, an enigmatic cult leader in a small California town who attempts to harness the powers of a local woman to resurrect his dead son. The film was re-released in 1983 under the title The Witching in an alternate cut.

== Plot ==
After Los Angeles housewife Lori Brandon suffers a stillbirth, her husband Frank obtains a job working in the advertising division of a toy company in the northern California community of Lilith. En route, they witness a violent car accident in which an oncoming vehicle swerves off an embankment, killing the female driver Jennie. When their car later runs out of gasoline, Frank walks toward town, and Lori waits at the car. She wanders into a field and finds a gravestone beneath a tree; there, she has a bizarre vision of a young boy's funeral.

Upon arriving in Lilith, Lori and Frank have dinner with his new boss, the eccentric Mr. Cato, who vaguely explains that Frank's job at the company will involve magic, and gives Lori a grimoire as a gift. Priscilla, another of Cato's employees, refers to Cato's dead son Timothy, whom he believes is merely "resting". Lori also discovers the house Frank and she have moved into had previously been rented by Jennie, the woman who died in the car accident.

Lori becomes increasingly unnerved when she observes the power Cato exerts over the small town, owning all of its businesses and maintaining influence over its exclusively young residents, all of whom appear to have interests in the occult. Cato informs Lori of his pursuit of necromancy, the act of bringing the dead back to life, the one power he claims to have been unable to obtain; he also explains to her he believes she holds the key between life and death, and can help him achieve the revival of his dead son Timothy.

Lori and Frank are invited to a party, whereupon arriving she discovers it is a formal anointment into the town's coven, but she refuses. The following day, she witnesses an apparition of Timothy, which lures her into the basement of her home, where she is attacked by a horde of rats. Later, she is confronted by Priscilla and Dr. Jay, another cult leader, who inform her she is to take the place of Timothy during a necromancy ceremony. Terrified, Lori attempts to locate Frank when he does not return home from work. She phones Nancy, one of Cato's associates. Nancy is in the midst of having sex with Frank. Nancy lies to Lori, telling her Frank went back to Los Angeles.

Priscilla calls Lori and tells her she wishes to leave Lilith with her, and claims to have confidential information about Frank; however, Lori finds her drowned in a creek in the woods before she is supposed to meet with her. After a series of hallucinations, Lori stumbles upon the necromancy ceremony at Timothy's grave, and is buried alive in exchange for his return.

Lori suddenly awakens, and realizes the events she has experienced were only a nightmare. Frank consoles her, but she soon realizes she is experiencing déjà vu, as they discuss their impending drive to Lilith. She realizes her nightmare was, in fact, a premonition of events to come.

== Cast ==
- Orson Welles as Mr. Cato
- Pamela Franklin as Lori Brandon
- Lee Purcell as Priscilla
- Michael Ontkean as Frank Brandon
- Harvey Jason as Dr. Jay
- Lisa James as Georgette
- Susan Bernard as Nancy
- Teddy Quinn as Timothy Carey
- Barbara Peckinpaugh as Jennie
- Brinke Stevens as Cult Member

== Production ==
Filming took place in Los Gatos, California, in 1970, under the working titles A Life for a Life and The Toy Factory. Orson Welles biographer Josh Karp suggested in his book Orson Welles's Last Movie: The Making of The Other Side of the Wind that Welles took the part in the film merely for the pay. The two young British actors, Pamela Franklin and Harvey Jason, met on set and married the same year.

== Release ==
During postproduction in the summer of 1971, Bert I. Gordon and Valiant Productions filed a lawsuit against the film's production company, Premiere Pictures, to regain creative control of the film. A superior court judge allotted Gordon 21 days to produce a recut version of the film in alignment with his original vision, which he was ordered to then give to Premiere, which was legally prevented from making any alterations.

The film was released theatrically in the United States by Cinerama Releasing Corporation in the fall of 1972. (Note: Per a newspaper archive search, the earliest release of the film occurred at the Allen Park Drive-In in Detroit, Michigan on September 20, 1972.) In some locations, it was advertised as The Devil God.

Over a decade after its original release, in 1983, the film was re-released in an altered cut bearing the title The Witching.

=== Critical response ===
Kevin Thomas of the Los Angeles Times referred to the film as a "so-so occult thriller ... Necromancy's production values are as solid as its plotting is full of holes," though he conceded the film is "technically very well made for its budget–but not very thought out." Lawrence DeVine of the Detroit Free Press wrote of the film: "Idle hands are Orson Welles' workshop as Welles lends approximately four percent of his immense talent to the role of one Mr. Cato ... Will Burt I. Gordon, who wrote, produced and directed this cauldron of corn, ever work again in Hollywood? Who cares?" William B. Collins of The Philadelphia Inquirer noted some "redeeming touches of humor," but ultimately summarized: "It wouldn't be so bad if Necromancy... succeeded in raising the dead. All it does, though, is capture the smell." Lloyd Ebert of Florida Today observed that, at his screening, the film had apparently been truncated from its original PG rating, and as a result suffered from having "no logical progression."

Writing for The Morning Herald, Ed Sullivan noted that Welles's performance in the film was "great". Joe Baltake of The Philadelphia Evening News called it "an awful film–despite the presence of impressive Orson Welles and dependable Pamela Franklin ... In the area of thrills and chills, Necromancy is pitifully malnourished. What's worse, it isn't even funny." The Courier-Journal's Gregg Swem noted that Welles appears "disinterested in his role. Most of his lines come across as mumbled incantations ... [The] script is weak. The direction is uninspired."

In 2017, Melissa Garza of Scared Stiff Reviews noted that the film's psychedelic elements "both age the film and take the viewer out of the moment. The special effects, though minimal, are quite awful. Still, the good far outweighs the bad," also remarking the performances as "fantastic". The same year, the publication CVLT Nation named Necromancy the 17th-best occult film of all time.

== Home media ==
The film was released on VHS in the U.S. as The Witching by both Paragon Video Productions and Magnum Entertainment in 1983. It was released as Necromancy on DVD by Video International on February 11, 2008. The film was released again on DVD by Pegasus Entertainment on November 18, 2002. On July 7, 2016, Code Red DVD released the film on Blu-ray in a limited edition of 1,000 copies.

== Bibliography ==
- Karp, Josh (2015). Orson Welles's Last Movie: The Making of The Other Side of the Wind. London: Macmillan. ISBN 978-1-250-00708-7.
