= Walk Like a Man (1987 film) =

- Theatrical release poster
- Directed by: Melvin Frank
- Written by: Robert Klane
- Produced by: Leonard C. Kroll
- Starring: Howie Mandel; Christopher Lloyd; Cloris Leachman; Ronny Cox; Colleen Camp; Amy Steel
- Cinematography: Victor J. Kemper
- Edited by: Bill Butler; Stephen Butler
- Music by: Lee Holdridge
- Production company: Metro-Goldwyn-Mayer
- Distributed by: MGM/UA
- Release date: April 17, 1987
- Running time: 86 minutes
- Country: United States
- Language: English
- Box office: $460,608

Walk Like a Man is a 1987 American comedy film directed by Melvin Frank and starring Howie Mandel, Christopher Lloyd, Amy Steel, and Cloris Leachman. The plot concerns a young man who finally returns to his high-society family after having been raised by wolves. It was released to theaters on April 17, 1987.

== Plot ==
Henry Shand goes to Alaska to search for gold and find his fortune. While there, his spoiled brat of a son, Reggie, gets mad that he has to work for money. What further angers him is that he has to share the dogsled with his 2-year-old brother Robert, nicknamed "Bobo". Reggie decides to take matters into his own hands and pushes the toddler off the sled, leaving him to die in the wintery Klondike wilderness.

Some 20 years later, Henry has died, giving Reggie a large inheritance of thirty million dollars. Reggie foolishly spends it within a year, causing his new bride, Rhonda, to become an angry alcoholic, as they have gone broke and had to move back in with Reggie's mother, Margaret. Margaret has gone insane since Bobo's disappearance and Henry's death, and has now spent much of the family's fortune on buying homes for stray cats.

Meanwhile, a biologist named Penny arrives from Alaska, claiming to have found Bobo alive and well. They discover that Bobo has been raised by timber wolves, causing him to sniff everyone's butts, greet people by licking their faces, run on all fours, eat with his mouth rather than using flatware, growl and bark, chew on shoes, and run through fresh cement while chasing cats or fire trucks.

Reggie decides to manipulate Bobo into signing over his inheritance to him to pay off gambling debts. Reggie tells Penny that she can use Bobo for wolf research, but first, she must teach him to walk, talk, read, and write. Penny gives Bobo a shave and a haircut, but getting him to act like a human proves to be difficult, and Bobo continues to cause problems unknowingly. Things get even worse when Bobo goes out in public, wreaking havoc in a shopping mall by entering dressing rooms, unwittingly trying on clothes, and walking out of stores with them.

As Bobo behaves more like a person than a dog, Penny falls in love with him. Reggie wants her to speed up the training of his savage sibling, as the people he owes money to enjoy their cash quickly. Penny stands up for Bobo in court, having discovered Reggie's scheme. Bobo refuses to sign, and Reggie frantically engages in canine behavior—growling, barking, chewing on a squeaky toy—in an attempt to demonstrate how Bobo was acting, making him look asinine to the judge, who dismisses the case. Bobo and Penny kiss outside, but Bobo stops to chase a fire engine.

== Cast ==
- Howie Mandel as Robert "Bobo" Shand
- Christopher Lloyd as Henry Shand (in a flashback)/Reggie Shand
- Cloris Leachman as Margaret Shand
- Colleen Camp as Rhonda Shand
- Amy Steel as Penny
- Stephen Elliott as Walter Welmont
- George DiCenzo as Bob (Bub) Downs
- John McLiam as H.P. Truman
- Earl Boen as Jack Mollins
- Howard Platt as Fred Land
- Millie Slavin as Essie Welmont
- William Bogert as A.J. (Al) Brown
- Carmen Filpi as Butler
- Isabel Cooley as Judge / Bystander
- Asa Lorre as Bobby Shand (Bobo as a boy)
- Jeremy Gosch as Young Reggie
- Phil Baron as Teddy Ruxpin

== Production ==
The wolves in this film were trained by uncredited employees of Steve Earl Martin's Frazier Park, California-based Working Wildlife cinematic and television animal sanctuary. Walk Like a Man was an independent film, produced by Mandel and distributed by Metro-Goldwyn-Mayer. The movie's budget is unknown; however, the film was a box office bomb, with a total gross of only $460,608. This was the final film directed by veteran Melvin Frank (The Court Jester; Li'l Abner; A Touch of Class).

== Home video ==
The film was released on VHS in late 1987, and on DVD on March 2, 2004.
