= Inherit the Wind (Hallmark Hall of Fame) =

1965 film by George Schaefer

- Hallmark Hall of Fame episode
- Episode no.: Season 15; Episode 2
- Directed by: George Schaefer
- Teleplay by: Robert Hartung
- Based on: Inherit the Wind; 1955 play by: Jerome Lawrence; Robert E. Lee
- Original air date: November 18, 1965
- Running time: 90 minutes

Guest appearances
- Melvyn Douglas; Ed Begley

Episode chronology
← Previous "Eagle in a Cage"	Next → "Amahl and the Night Visitors"

Inherit the Wind is the November 18, 1965 episode of the American television series Hallmark Hall of Fame directed by George Schaefer. A videotaped adaptation of the 1955 play of the same name, it shortened the text of the original 1955 play which was written as a parable fictionalizing the 1925 Scopes "Monkey" Trial as a means of discussing the 1950s McCarthy trials.

== Cast ==
- Melvyn Douglas as Henry Drummond
- Ed Begley as Matthew Harrison Brady
- Murray Hamilton as E. K. Hornbeck
- John Randolph as Rev. Brown
- Burt Brinckerhoff as Bert Cates
- Diane Baker as Rachel Brown
- Adrienne King as Melinda

== Awards and nominations ==
Year	Award	Category	Nominee(s)	Result	Ref.
1966	Primetime Emmy Awards	Outstanding Dramatic Program	George Schaefer	Nominated	
1966	Primetime Emmy Awards	Outstanding Single Performance by an Actor in a Leading Role in a Drama	Ed Begley	Nominated	
1966	Primetime Emmy Awards	Outstanding Single Performance by an Actor in a Leading Role in a Drama	Melvyn Douglas	Nominated	
1966	Primetime Emmy Awards	Outstanding Performance by an Actress in a Supporting Role in a Drama	Diane Baker	Nominated	
1966	Primetime Emmy Awards	Outstanding Directorial Achievement in Drama	George Schaefer	Nominated	
1966	Primetime Emmy Awards	Individual Achievements in Art Direction and Allied Crafts – Makeup	Bob O'Bradovich	Nominated	
1966	Primetime Emmy Awards	Individual Achievements in Electronic Production – Technical Directors	O. Tamburri	Won	
1966	Primetime Emmy Awards	Special Classification of Individual Achievements	Robert Hartung	Nominated	

== See also ==
- List of American films of 1965
- Trial movies
