= All American Bully =

- Directed by: Jason Hawkins
- Written by: Jason Hawkins
- Starring: Adrienne King; Daren Ackerman; Alexander Fraser; Alicia Rose
- Production company: Gravestone Entertainment
- Release date: June 23, 2015
- Running time: 90 minutes
- Country: United States
- Language: English

All American Bully is an American horror thriller film directed and written by Jason Hawkins. It stars Adrienne King, Daren Ackerman, Alexander Fraser, and Alicia Rose.

== Premise ==
Devon, Garrett, and Becky are a group of friends who are considered outcasts. Devon becomes the target of a homophobic assault by a group of classmates, led by his former friend John. The assault is recorded and released online. Without much support from his family or the high school faculty, Devon is left to decide whether he’s going to let the bullying continue or put an end to it by standing up for himself. Becky encourages him to take action, leading to Devon plotting revenge, creating a viral video of his own, leading to more violence.

== Cast ==
- Adrienne King as Principal Kane
- Daren Ackerman as John Brooks
- Alexander Fraser as Devon Manning
- Alicia Rose as Becky
- Dara Davey as Shelly Mulgrove
- Patrick Ford as Mr. Taylor

== Reception ==
The film has been criticized for its violent content with some critics saying that the graphic nature of the film overshadows the message the film was trying to convey. Grace Montgomery stated that "Although it seems like it's trying to make a statement about social media and bullying, most of what the film has to say is lost under the horrifying violence that has no resolution." Justin Hamelin praised the film saying that "All American Bully does not simplify the terrible epidemic of bullying in our society these days, nor does it glorify the damage done either by the antagonist or to the victims. It is a reserved and respectful approach to a problem that desperately needs to stop. Perhaps the best compliment I can give this film is that it should be considered for discussion amongst high school classes across the country and while there is a very upsetting scene that I had trouble getting through towards the end of the film, this is the harsh reality we live in and by spreading awareness of the issues at hand, we can hopefully work towards a society where bullying becomes the exception, as opposed to the expected."
