= Amy Steel =

American actress (born 1960)

- Born: May 3, 1960 (age 66); Philadelphia,Pennsylvania U.S.
- Occupation: Actress
- Years active: 1980–2004, 2009, 2013, 2014, 2021–present
- Known for: Friday the 13th Part 2; The Powers of Matthew Star; Guiding Light; April Fool's Day; Walk Like a Man
- Children: 2

Amy Steel (born May 3, 1960) is a former American actress. Steel is best known for portraying the heroine Ginny Field in the slasher film Friday the 13th Part 2 (1981) and Kit in the black comedy April Fool's Day (1986).

Steel began her career with story arcs in the soap operas Guiding Light (1980) and All My Children (1980). Outside of Friday the 13th Part 2 and April Fool’s Day, Steel had notable roles in the comedy films Fat Chance (1981) and Walk Like a Man (1987). On television, Steel had a main role on the NBC science fiction series The Powers of Matthew Star (1982-83), in addition to several guest appearances on other series such as Family Ties (1982), Quantum Leap (1990), Home Improvement (1994), American Gothic (1996), and Millennium (1997).

In the early 2000s, citing difficulty securing substantial roles as she aged, Steel retired from acting and began a career as a therapist.

== Career ==
=== Film ===
Steel made her film debut in Manuel Summers little-seen comedy film Fat Chance (1981). The film revolves around the characters Michael and Mary, both of whom are overweight and communicate through letters, sending each other photographs of people claiming to be themselves—Mary’s picture she sends is of Allison (portrayed by Steel in a supporting role), the granddaughter of her employer. Steel had her breakthrough role in Steve Miner’s slasher film Friday the 13th Part 2 (1981) as aspiring child psychologist Ginny Field. Steel had two days of shooting in the daytime and the rest at night. The shoot was exhausting for her to the point of her stating: "I hope I never have to do another horror film the rest of my life." In a review for IGN, film critic Eric Goldman wrote: "The lead character, Ginny (the likable Amy Steel), is one of the most appealing in the entire series." The film was a box office success, grossing $21,722,776 worldwide (equivalent to $88,375,752 in 2026). For the sequel, Friday the 13th Part III (1982), Miner envisioned making Ginny the series protagonist; having spent a lot of time developing variant Ginny-centric storylines such as one placing her in a psychiatric hospital to another taking place on a college campus where she actively goes on a pursuit to find Jason after he kills her roommate. Steel turned down a sequel offer because her agent was pushing her for higher-budget roles, and she was exhausted from the second film. In retrospect, Steel has stated she regrets not doing the film as she likes the way Ginny was written.

Steel's next feature role was Kit in Fred Walton's hybrid black comedy mystery film April Fool's Day (1986) which she described as a different shooting experience compared to Friday. Steel portrayed Penny, an environmental scientist, in Melvin Frank's comedy film Walk Like a Man (1987), starring alongside Howie Mandel and Christopher Lloyd. The film grossed $460k ($1 million inflated). In a review for Reel Film Reviews, David Nusair, who gave the film itself a negative review, highlighted Steel’s performance: "scream queen Steel is effective as Bobo's love interest."

I think it would be really cool to come back as Ginny again. The funny thing is that I've never been asked since Part 3. But I think it's time to see Ginny again in a Friday the 13th movie. She has some unfinished business.

— Steel on the possibility of returning to the Friday the 13th series

In 1996, Steel had a guest appearance as Christie, a pregnant woman, in the CBS cult horror series American Gothic (1996) episode "Rebirth", starring opposite Sarah Paulson.

In 2014, Steel made her first acting appearance in 11 years in the anthology horror film Tales of Poe. She starred alongside Adrienne King and Caroline Williams. In 2021, Steel appeared as Dr. Ginny Field in the medium-length horror film Jason Rising: A Friday the 13th Fan Film — in a voice role cameo.

=== Television ===
Steel began her career with guest roles on the CBS soap opera Guiding Light alongside fellow Friday the 13th star Kevin Bacon, as Trudy Wilson from 1980 to 1981, and as Peggy Warner on All My Children in 1980. In 1982, Steel had guest roles on the television series Seven Brides for Seven Brothers (1982) as Allison Freleng, Family Ties (1982) as Stephanie Brooks (Michael J. Fox's character's first sexual encounter), CHiPs as Kelly Monahan, The A-Team (1983) as Kathy Ludlam, before being cast as Pam Elliott in the sci-fi series The Powers of Matthew Star alongside Peter Barton, who went on to appear in Friday the 13th: The Final Chapter. The series lasted until 1983. She was subsequently cast in the television films Women of San Quentin (1983) as Liz Larson and First Steps (1985) as Nan Davis. From 1983 to 1984, Steel portrayed Sharon on the short lived television series For Love and Honor.

In 1985, she had a guest appearance in Stir Crazy as Lisa Grant. The following year, Steel was cast in the television thriller film The Red Spider. In 1987, and again in 1989, Steel a guest roles in Jake and the Fatman. Steel later had a small role as a neighbor in David Greene’s ABC thriller film Whatever Happened to Baby Jane? (1991), a television remake of the 1962 film of the same name. The same year, she guest starred on China Beach and Walter & Emily. In 1992, Steel was cast in the television film Perry Mason: The Case of the Reckless Romeo. The same year, she was cast in the horror film Play Nice.

In 1994, Steel guest starred on Viper, Home Improvement and Diagnosis: Murder before being cast in the television films Ray Alexander: A Taste for Justice and The Innocent. In 1995, she was cast in the television series The Commish and the television film Damaged and Deceived. In 1996, she guest starred on American Gothic and Chicago Hope. The following year, she portrayed Dr. Liz Michaels in an episode of Millennium. In 1999, Steel was cast in the films Valerie Flake and Tycus. The following year, she portrayed Commander Samantha Woodling in a guest appearance on JAG.

In 2003, Steel was cast as Claire Goodman Isenberg in the television film A Time to Remember. After this role, Steel took an extensive break from acting and became a psychotherapist.

== Personal life ==
During the filming of the 1985 television film First Steps, Steel developed a friendship with Nan Davis. In an interview, Steel said:

"We have a good relationship, we don't fret if we don't talk for a month. The filming ended last May, and we've seen each other two or three times since then. We get on the phone and it's as if we've not been out of touch at all."

== Filmography ==
=== Film ===
Year	Title	Role	Notes
1981	Fat Chance	Alison	
1981	Friday the 13th Part 2	Ginny Field	
1983	Exposed	Party Guest	Cameo
1986	April Fool's Day	Kit Graham	
1987	Walk Like a Man	Penny	
1992	Play Nice	Nancy	
1999	Valerie Flake	Denise	
1999	Tycus	Little Girl's Mother	Direct-to-video film
2013	Crystal Lake Memories: The Complete History of Friday the 13th	Herself	Documentary film
2014	Tales of Poe	Mother of Dreams / Poetic Narrator	
2021	Jason Rising: A Friday the 13th Fan Film	Dr. Ginny Field	Voice role

=== Television ===
Year	Title	Role	Notes
1980	All My Children	Peggy Warner	Recurring role
1980–1981	Guiding Light	Trudy Wilson	Recurring role
1982	Seven Brides for Seven Brothers	Allison Frelang	1 episode
1982–1983	The Powers of Matthew Star	Pam Elliott	Main role
1982	Family Ties	Stephanie Brooks	1 episode
1983	CHiPs	Kelly Monahan	1 episode
1983	The A-Team	Kathy Ludlam	1 episode
1983	Women of San Quentin	Liz Larson	Television film
1983–1984	For Love and Honor	Sharon	12 episodes
1985	Stir Crazy	Lisa Grant	1 episode
1985	First Steps	Nan Davis	Television film
1987–1989	Jake and the Fatman	Samantha Shay / Mia Delaine	2 episodes
1987	Home Fires	Cathy Ash	Television film
1987	The Red Spider	Kate O'Day	Television film
1990	Father Dowling Mysteries	Murphy	1 episode
1990	Quantum Leap	Maggie Spontini	1 episode
1991	China Beach	Maria Koloski	1 episode
1991	Walter & Emily	Ginny	1 episode
1991	What Ever Happened to Baby Jane?	Connie Trotter	Television film
1992	Perry Mason: The Case of the Reckless Romeo	Roxanne Shields	Television film
1993	Space Rangers	Sarah Boon	1 episode
1993	Time Trax	Laura Darrow	1 episode
1994	Viper	Lisa Hinkle	1 episode
1994	Home Improvement	Eve	1 episode
1994	Diagnosis: Murder	Jenny Morley	1 episode
1994	Ray Alexander: A Taste for Justice	Dr. Gail Baker	Television film
1994	The Innocent	Molly	Television film
1995	The Commish	Rhonda Shonick	1 episode
1995	Abandoned and Deceived	N/A	Television film
1996	American Gothic	Christie	1 episode
1996	Chicago Hope	Lisa Erickson	1 episode
1997	Millennium	Dr. Liz Michaels	Episode: "A Single Blade of Grass"
2000	JAG	Commander Samantha Woodling	Edisode: "Promises"
2003	A Time to Remember	Claire Goodman Isenberg	Television film
2009	His Name Was Jason: 30 Years of Friday the 13th	Herself	Television documentary

=== Web ===
Year	Title	Role	Notes	Ref.
2026	Friday the 13th: Camp Crystal Legacy	Herself	2 episodes; documentary web series	
