= 18th Primetime Emmy Awards =

1966 American television programming awards

- Date: May 22, 1966
- Location: Hollywood Palladium, Los Angeles, California
- Presented by: Academy of Television Arts and Sciences
- Hosted by: Danny Kaye; Bill Cosby

Highlights
- Most awards: The Dick Van Dyke Show (4)
- Most nominations: The Dick Van Dyke Show (8)
- Outstanding Comedy Series: The Dick Van Dyke Show
- Outstanding Dramatic Series: The Fugitive
- Outstanding Dramatic Program: The Ages of Man
- Outstanding Musical Program: Frank Sinatra: A Man and His Music
- Outstanding Variety Series: The Andy Williams Show

Television/radio coverage
- Network: CBS

The 18th Emmy Awards, later known as the 18th Primetime Emmy Awards, were handed out on May 22, 1966, at the Hollywood Palladium. The ceremony was hosted by Danny Kaye and Bill Cosby. 24 awards were presented.

The top show of the night was The Dick Van Dyke Show, which won its fourth consecutive top series award, and achieved four major wins. The ceremony returned to a more traditional format, after experimenting the previous year.

== Winners and nominees ==
Winners are listed in bold and series' networks are in parentheses.

=== Programs ===
Programs
**Outstanding Comedy Series**: **The Dick Van Dyke Show (CBS)**; Batman (ABC); Bewitched (ABC); Get Smart (NBC); Hogan's Heroes (CBS)	**Outstanding Dramatic Series**: **The Fugitive (ABC)**; Bonanza (NBC); I Spy (NBC); The Man from U.N.C.L.E. (NBC); Slattery's People (CBS)
**Outstanding Variety Series**: **The Andy Williams Show (NBC)**; The Danny Kaye Show (CBS); The Hollywood Palace (ABC); The Red Skelton Show (CBS); The Tonight Show Starring Johnny Carson (NBC)	**Outstanding Musical Program**: **Frank Sinatra: A Man and His Music (NBC)**; The Bell Telephone Hour (NBC); The Bolshoi Ballet (Syndicated); Color Me Barbra (CBS); New York Philharmonic Young People's Concerts with Leonard Bernstein (CBS)
**Outstanding Variety Special**: **Chrysler Presents The Bob Hope Christmas Special (NBC)**; An Evening with Carol Channing (CBS); Jimmy Durante Meets the Lively Arts (ABC); The Julie Andrews Show (NBC); The Swinging World of Sammy Davis, Jr. (Syndicated)	**Outstanding Children's Program**: **A Charlie Brown Christmas (CBS)**; Captain Kangaroo (CBS); Discovery (ABC); NBC Children's Theatre: "The World of Stuart Little" (NBC); Walt Disney's Wonderful World of Color: "Further Adventures of Gallagher" (NBC)
**Achievements in Daytime Programming - Programs**: **Camera Three (CBS)**; **Mutual of Omaha's Wild Kingdom (NBC)**; Today (NBC)	**Outstanding Dramatic Program**: **The Ages of Man (CBS)**; Hallmark Hall of Fame: "Eagle in a Cage" (NBC); Hallmark Hall of Fame: "Inherit the Wind" (NBC); Slattery's People: "Rally 'Round Your Own Flag, Mister" (CBS)

=== Acting ===
==== Lead performances ====
Lead performances
**Outstanding Continued Performance by an Actor in a Leading Role in a Comedy Series**: **Dick Van Dyke as Rob Petrie in The Dick Van Dyke Show (CBS)**; Don Adams as Maxwell Smart in Get Smart (NBC); Bob Crane as Col. Robert E. Hogan in Hogan's Heroes (CBS)	**Outstanding Continued Performance by an Actress in a Leading Role in a Comedy Series**: **Mary Tyler Moore as Laura Petrie in The Dick Van Dyke Show (CBS)**; Lucille Ball as Lucy Carmichael in The Lucy Show (CBS); Elizabeth Montgomery as Samantha Stephens in Bewitched (ABC)
**Outstanding Continued Performance by an Actor in a Leading Role in a Dramatic Series**: **Bill Cosby as Alexander Scott in I Spy (NBC)**; Richard Crenna as James Slattery in Slattery's People (CBS); Robert Culp as Kelly Robinson in I Spy (NBC); David Janssen as Dr. Richard Kimble in The Fugitive (ABC); David McCallum as Illya Kuryakin in The Man from U.N.C.L.E. (NBC)	**Outstanding Continued Performance by an Actress in a Leading Role in a Dramatic Series**: **Barbara Stanwyck as Victoria Barkley in The Big Valley (ABC)**; Anne Francis as Honey West in Honey West (ABC); Barbara Parkins as Betty Anderson Cord in Peyton Place (ABC)

==== Supporting performances ====
Supporting performances
**Outstanding Performance by an Actor in a Supporting Role in a Comedy**: **Don Knotts as Barney Fife in The Andy Griffith Show (CBS) (Episode: "The Return of Barney Fife")**; Morey Amsterdam as Buddy Sorrell in The Dick Van Dyke Show (CBS); Frank Gorshin as The Riddler in Batman (ABC) (Episode: "Hi Diddle Riddle"); Werner Klemperer as Col. Wilhelm Klink in Hogan's Heroes (CBS)	**Outstanding Performance by an Actress in a Supporting Role in a Comedy**: **Alice Pearce as Gladys Kravitz in Bewitched (ABC)**; Rose Marie as Sally Rogers in The Dick Van Dyke Show (CBS); Agnes Moorehead as Endora in Bewitched (ABC)
**Outstanding Performance by an Actor in a Supporting Role in a Drama**: **James Daly as Dr. O'Meara in Hallmark Hall of Fame (NBC) (Episode: "Eagle in a Cage")**; David Burns as The Great McGonigle in The Trials of O'Brien (CBS); Leo G. Carroll as Alexander Waverly in The Man from U.N.C.L.E. (NBC)	**Outstanding Performance by an Actress in a Supporting Role in a Drama**: **Lee Grant as Stella Chernak in Peyton Place (ABC)**; Diane Baker as Rachel Brown in Hallmark Hall of Fame (NBC) (Episode: "Inherit the Wind"); Pamela Franklin as Betsy Balcombe in Hallmark Hall of Fame (NBC) (Episode: "Eagle in a Cage"); Jeanette Nolan as Helen Robinson in I Spy (NBC) (Episode: "The Conquest of Maude Murdock")

==== Single performances ====
Single performances
**Outstanding Single Performance by an Actor in a Leading Role in a Drama**: **Cliff Robertson as Quincey Parke in Bob Hope Presents the Chrysler Theatre (NBC): "The Game"**; Ed Begley as Matthew Harrison Brady in Hallmark Hall of Fame (NBC): "Inherit the Wind"; Melvyn Douglas as Henry Drummond in Hallmark Hall of Fame (NBC): "Inherit the Wind"; Trevor Howard as Napoleon in Hallmark Hall of Fame (NBC): "Eagle in a Cage"; Christopher Plummer as Hamlet in Hamlet at Elsinore (Syndicated)	**Outstanding Single Performance by an Actress in a Leading Role in a Drama**: **Simone Signoret as Sara Lescault in Bob Hope Presents the Chrysler Theatre (NBC): "A Small Rebellion"**; Eartha Kitt as Angel in I Spy (NBC): "The Loser"; Margaret Leighton as Chris Becker in Dr. Kildare (NBC): "A Life for a Life"; Shelley Winters as Edith in Bob Hope Presents the Chrysler Theatre (NBC): "Back to Back"

=== Directing ===
Directing
**Outstanding Directorial Achievement in Comedy**: **Bewitched (ABC) – William Asher**; The Dick Van Dyke Show (CBS) – Jerry Paris; Get Smart (NBC): "Diplomat's Daughter" – Paul Bogart	**Outstanding Directorial Achievement in Drama**: **Bob Hope Presents the Chrysler Theatre (NBC): "The Game" – Sydney Pollack**; Hallmark Hall of Fame (NBC): "Eagle in a Cage" – George Schaefer; Hallmark Hall of Fame (NBC): "Inherit the Wind" – George Schaefer; I Spy (NBC) – Sheldon Leonard
**Outstanding Directorial Achievement in Variety or Music**: **The Julie Andrews Show (NBC) – Alan Handley**; The Andy Williams Show (NBC) – Bob Henry; Color Me Barbra (CBS) – Dwight Hemion; The Dean Martin Comedy Hour (NBC) – Greg Garrison; Frank Sinatra: A Man and His Music (NBC) – Dwight Hemion

=== Writing ===
Writing
**Outstanding Writing Achievement in Comedy**: **The Dick Van Dyke Show (CBS): "Coast to Coast Big Mouth" – Bill Persky and Sam Denoff**; The Dick Van Dyke Show (CBS): "The Ugliest Dog in the World" – Bill Persky and Sam Denoff; Get Smart (NBC): "Mr. Big" – Mel Brooks and Buck Henry	**Outstanding Writing Achievement in Drama**: **Hallmark Hall of Fame (NBC): "Eagle in a Cage" – Millard Lampell**; Bob Hope Presents the Chrysler Theatre (NBC): "The Game" – S. Lee Pogostin; I Spy (NBC): "A Cup of Kindness" – Morton S. Fine and David Friedkin
**Outstanding Writing Achievement in Variety**: **An Evening with Carol Channing (CBS) – Al Gordon, Hal Goldman and Sheldon Keller**; The Danny Kaye Show (CBS) – Ernest Chambers, Pat McCormick, Ron Friedman, Larry Tucker, Paul Mazursky, Billy Barnes, Bernard Rothman, Norman Barasch and Carroll Moore; The Julie Andrews Show (CBS) – Bill Persky and Sam Denoff

== Most major nominations ==
Networks with multiple major nominations (Note: "Major" constitutes the categories listed above: Program, Acting, Directing, and Writing. Does not include the technical categories.)
Network	Number of Nominations
NBC	45
CBS	29
ABC	15

Programs with multiple major nominations
Program	Category	Network	Number of Nominations
The Dick Van Dyke Show	Comedy	CBS	8
I Spy	Drama	NBC	7
Eagle in a Cage	Special	NBC	6
Bewitched	Comedy	ABC	5
Bob Hope Presents the Chrysler Theatre	Drama	NBC	5
Inherit the Wind	Special	NBC	5
Get Smart	Comedy	NBC	4
Hogan's Heroes	Comedy	CBS	3
The Julie Andrews Show	Variety	CBS	3
The Man from U.N.C.L.E.	Drama	NBC	3
Slattery's People	Drama	CBS	3
The Andy Williams Show	Variety	NBC	2
Batman	Comedy	ABC	2
Color Me Barbra	Music	CBS	2
The Danny Kaye Show	Variety	CBS	2
An Evening with Carol Channing	Variety	CBS	2
Frank Sinatra: A Man and His Music	Music	NBC	2
The Fugitive	Drama	ABC	2
Peyton Place	Drama	ABC	2

== Most major awards ==
Networks with multiple major awards
Network	Number of Awards
NBC	45
CBS	9
ABC	5

Programs with multiple major awards
Program	Category	Network	Number of Awards
The Dick Van Dyke Show	Comedy	CBS	4
Bob Hope Presents the Chrysler Theatre	Drama	NBC	3
Bewitched	Comedy	ABC	2
Eagle in a Cage	Special	NBC	2
