= Vindication (film) =

- Directed by: Bart Mastronardi
- Written by: Bart Mastronardi
- Produced by: Bart Mastronardi
- Starring: Keith Fraser
- Cinematography: Bart Mastronardi
- Edited by: Stolis Hadjicharalambous
- Music by: William Archiello
- Distributed by: Mastropiece Productions
- Release date: 2008
- Country: United States
- Language: English

Vindication is independent film maker Bart Mastronardi's feature length psychological horror film, based on his award-winning short. The film is a morality tale about a young man whose experience guilt after surviving a suicide attempt.

== Plot ==
At the age of twenty Nicolas Bertram is a first year Art student at college whose career appears to be on the right track, but Nicolas' life has been filled with the guilt of unfortunate events. With no money and barely able to pay for college, Nicolas eases his guilt as a cutter; someone who leaves slashes of razor marks on his body due to emotional pain. His only friend that he confides in is his roommate, Michel Rodriguez, a young gay man majoring in Art with Nicolas. Michel tells Nicolas of his own father who beat him for being gay, but informs Nicolas that the guilt Nicolas holds onto will show no mercy unless Nicolas learns to accept it and move on in his life. After class Nicolas decides to visit his father for some help but doesn't receive a warm welcome from his dad. After leaving his father's place Nicolas returns to his apartment, out of an act of despair Nicolas decides to end his life by slitting his wrist in his bathtub. Only Nicolas survives his bloody suicidal attempt releasing the guilt inside of him to manifest into reality, which directs Nicolas to finally come out to live the life he was destined to live. Nicolas' very own conscious manifests into reality calling itself Kon'Shens, who tells Nicolas to listen to the apparitions as they will appear to him and give Nicolas' directions on his new path. Each apparition directs and reminds Nicolas to realize guilt will continue to show no mercy unless he accepts the truth of who he is in life. Nicolas knows he must vindicate himself on this horrific journey, which leads to a trail of blood, murder, madness and mayhem.

== Cast ==
Cast	Character
Keith Fraser	Nicolas Bertram
Henry Boriello	Photographer
Zoe Daelman Chlanda	Cassandra Bertram
Michael Coyne	Officer McCain
Patrick Cronen	Darren
William Archiello	Mark McBride
Michael Gingold	Dr. on Gurney
Jeff Lupus	Bud
William Hammerer	Dr. On Gurney
Alan Rowe Kelly	Urbane
Petar Krsikapa	Slash Victim / Dr.
Miguel Lopez	Michel
Marc Masters	Dante
Jerry Murdock	William Bertram
Maryam Murdock	Nurse
Christopher J. Otis	Time Keeper
Richard Thor Wenzel	Dereck

== Production ==
"The cast and crew deserve so much of the credit for making Vindication as they have stuck with me through the whole process. That is a lot to ask of people for no or little money, but as production grew it just kept getting better as did the movie itself," explains Bart. Working on an ultra low budget of less than $200,000 VINDICATION prides itself on being filmed with an independent spirit of filmmaking as it is a movie of finding one's path of self-discovery and accepting oneself, which just happens to be told within the horror genre. For Nicolas Bertram his path of accepting himself is both painful and horrifying, and as with all great tragedies this journey of self-discovery it is a process that is something far greater in than Nicolas ever imagined himself to be. VINDICATION is a visual horror movie influenced by great pieces of tragedy, theater, literature, and great movies and, of course, classic horror films. Bart directed his focus on making sure that VINDICATION is more of a chilling personal story for the movie's tragic protagonist, Nicolas Bertram, through utilizing the cinematic elements of film making: story, music, sound, cinematography, editing and acting. "All great movies, especially the horror genre, have always been about that roller coaster ride of building up the emotions through those elements," Bart says, "so by utilizing the elements of film making and placing them within the horror genre created the chilling world of Nicolas Bertram in VINDICATION."

== Post-production and distribution ==
In April 2010 Vindication was released for distribution by R-Squared Films.

Vindication played at the June 2009 NYC Fangoria magazine Weekend of Horror Convention at the Jacob Javits Center.

== Reception ==
"Eloquent, original and deeply felt, Vindication is a triumph. The film delivers shock after shock, horror upon horror, creating scenes that are intensely beautiful and immensely bloody at the same time. Writer/Director Bart Mastronardi has made a film with brains, balls and beauty, which has dug deep for characters we care for; played with an extraordinary cast of new faces with passion and power. This is a taste of what a real horror movie looks and feels like." -Clive Barker

== See also ==
- List of horror films of 2006
