= Bart Mastronardi =

American film director

- Bart Mastronardi
- Born: 23 May 1972 (age 54); Queens, New York, U.S.
- Occupations: Film director, screenwriter, cinematographer, producer, photographer
- Website: bartmastronardiphotography.com

Bart Mastronardi is an American director, screenwriter, cinematographer, producer, photographer. He resides in New York City, teaching camera, lighting, and directing at the New York Film Academy. His debut featureVindication received positive coverage in Fangoria magazine.

His feature film Tales of Poe, released in 2014, won the Audience Choice Award at the Screams in the Dark Festival held in Omaha, Nebraska.

== Filmography ==
| Year | Film | Director | Cinematographer | Producer | Writer | Actor | Notes |
|---|---|---|---|---|---|---|---|
| 2006 | Vindication | Yes | Yes | | Yes | Yes | played Demon |
| 2007 | Ding Dong Date (short) | | Yes | | | | |
| 2007 | The Blood Shed | | Yes | | | | |
| 2008 | Pink Eye | | Yes | | | | 2nd unit Cinematographer |
| 2009 | Crossed | | Yes | | | | |
| 2009 | Experiment 7 | | | | | Yes | played Plaid Mutant |
| 2009 | Contact (short) | | | Yes | | Yes | Co-Producer |
| 2011 | The Sadist | | | | | Yes | played Mental Patient |
| 2012 | Razor Days | | Yes | | | | |
| 2013 | Gallery of Fear | | Yes | Yes | | | |
| 2014 | Tales of Poe | Yes | Yes | Yes | Yes | | post-production |
