= Slice of life (disambiguation) =

Slice of life is a genre of art depicting mundane experiences.

Slice of life may also refer to:

== Film and television ==
=== Film ===
- A Slice of Life (1914 film), an American silent film
- A Slice of Life (1954 film), an Italian-French comedy film
- A Slice of Life (1983 film), an Australian comedy film
- Slice of Life: The American Dream. In Former Pizza Huts, a 2024 documentary feature film by Matthew Salleh and Rose Tucker

=== TV ===
- "The Slice of Life", an episode of Roseanne aired in 1989
- "Slice of Life" (My Little Pony: Friendship Is Magic), a television episode aired in 2015

== Other uses ==
- "Slice of Life" (song), by Bauhaus
- "A Slice of Life" (short story), by P. G. Wodehouse
