= Eagle in a Cage (Hallmark Hall of Fame) =

- Hallmark Hall of Fame episode
- Pamela Franklin and Trevor Howard in Eagle in a Cage
- Episode no.: Season 15; Episode 1
- Directed by: George Schaefer
- Written by: Millard Lampell
- Original air date: October 20, 1965

Guest appearances
- Trevor Howard as Napoleon; James Daly as Dr. O'Meara; Pamela Franklin as Betsy Balcombe

Episode chronology
← Previous "Holy Terror"	Next → "Inherit the Wind"

"Eagle in a Cage" was an American television movie broadcast on October 20, 1965, as part of the television series, Hallmark Hall of Fame. It told the story of Napoleon at Saint Helena.

Millard Lampell was the writer and George Schaefer the producer and director. Trevor Howard starred as Napoleon. The production was nominated for six Emmy Awards and won two: Lampell for Outstanding Writing for a Drama Series, and James Daly for Outstanding Supporting Actor in a Drama Series.

== Plot ==
The movie tells the story of Napoleon during his exile by Great Britain to the island of Saint Helena. After his efforts to escape are unsuccessful, Napoleon (played by Trevor Howard) writes his memoir and befriends a local girl Betsy Balcombe (played by Pamela Franklin).

== Cast ==
The cast included:

- Trevor Howard as Napoleon
- James Daly as Dr. O'Meara
- George Rose as Cipriani
- Pamela Franklin as Betsy Balcombe
- Richard Waring as Bertrand
- William Smithers as Gourgaud
- Basil Langton as Sir Hudson Lowe
- Jacqueline Bertrand as Mme. Bertrand
- Frederic Warriner as Las Cases
- Guy Spaull as Lord Keith
- Norman Barrs as The Sentry

== Production ==
The movie was broadcast on October 20, 1965, as the season opener of the 15th season of the television series, Hallmark Hall of Fame. Millard Lampell was the writer and George Schaefer the producer and director.

The production was nominated in six categories at the 18th Primetime Emmy Awards. Lampell won the Emmy for Outstanding Writing Achievement in Drama, and James Daly won for Outstanding Performance by an Actor in a Supporting Role in a Drama. The remaining nominations were: Outstanding Dramatic Program, Outstanding Performance by an Actor in a Leading Role for Trevor Howard, Outstanding Performance by an Actress in a Supporting Role for Pamela Franklin, and Outstanding Directorial Achievement in Drama for Schaefer.
