= Emmy Award for Outstanding Drama Series =

Emmy Award for Outstanding Drama Series may refer to the following Emmy Awards:

- Primetime Emmy Award for Outstanding Drama Series
- Daytime Emmy Award for Outstanding Drama Series
- International Emmy Award for Best Drama Series
