= Alan Rowe Kelly =

American director

- Born: 13 January 1959 (age 67); Dover, New Jersey, U.S.
- Occupations: Film director, screenwriter, actor, producer

Alan Rowe Kelly (born January 13, 1959) is an American independent film actor, director, writer and producer, specializing in horror films.

== Biography ==
Kelly was born in Dover, New Jersey. After attending New York City art schools, Kelly commenced his career as an art director in the cosmetics field before becoming a makeup artist and hair stylist in Manhattan's fashion/advertising industry, working behind the camera for fashion magazines, catalogs, television commercials and infomercials.

In 1999, Kelly began directing, producing and writing screenplays for horror movies, entering the independent horror scene with his award-winning debut film I'll Bury You Tomorrow (2002). In 2006, Kelly founded SouthPaw Pictures, a film production company based in Paterson, New Jersey. His other directing credits include Gallery of Fear (2013), The Blood Shed (2007) and Tales of Poe (2013). He portrays female characters in these and other films, such as Vindication (2006), Satan Hates You (2010) and Razor Days (2012).

Kelly has been a longtime resident of Wharton, New Jersey, and wrote a history of the borough together with his mother.

== Bibliography ==
- Wharton (Arcadia Press) – Charlotte Kelly & Alan Rowe Kelly

== Awards ==
- 2002 Telluride Indiefest Best Horror Feature for I'll Bury You Tomorrow.
- 2002 New York International Independent Film and Video Festival Best Horror Feature for I'll Bury You Tomorrow.
- 2007 Dark Carnival Film Festival Best Feature for The Blood Shed.
- 2009 Terror Film Festival Best Actor for A Far Cry from Home/Gallery of Fear.
- 2009 Long Island Gay & Lesbian Film Festival Jury Award for Most Exciting New Filmmaker – A Far Cry from Home/Gallery of Fear.
- 2010 Terror Film Festival Best Supporting Actor for Bart Mastronardi's Vindication.
- 2010 Dark Carnival Film Festival Best Supporting Actor for Hypochondriac/Psycho Street.
- 2012 Terror Film Festival Best Actor in Something Just.
