= Deadly Manners =

Mystery podcast by AMC and Paragon

Deadly Manners is a 2017 fiction podcast produced by AMC Networks and The Paragon Collective starring RuPaul, LeVar Burton, Anna Chlumsky, and Kristen Bell.

== Background ==
The podcast debuted on October 13, 2017. The podcast was produced by AMC Networks in partnership with The Paragon Collective and available on SundanceNow as well as Shudder. The podcast was directed by Alex Aldea and created by Ali Garfinkel. The podcast stars Anna Chlumsky and Kristen Bell. The podcast introduction is performed by RuPaul. LeVar Burton is the narrator of the podcast. The podcast is a ten episode series. The podcast uses stereophonic sound so that sound effects can change from one earbud or headphone to the other. The podcast drew inspiration from the movies Clue and Death Becomes Her. The podcast is set in 1954 during a dinner party that gets snowed in and each of the guests start getting murdered one at a time.

== Reception ==
Sean Keeley wrote in The Comeback that the podcast was "well-produced and a lot of fun." Chelsea Tatham wrote in the Tampa Bay Times that the podcast's "audio quality [is] scary great." The podcast received two out of five microphones from Podcast Magazine because the show leaned so heavily on narration rather than acting.
