= Darkest Night (podcast) =

Horror podcast by Paragon and Shudder

Darkest Night is a horror and science fiction podcast hosted by Lee Pace produced by the Paragon Collective and AMC's streaming service Shudder. The podcast debuted in 2016 and ended in 2018 and used binaural recording to create 3D audio effects. The show follows the experiences of a research assistant at a company experimenting with recreating the memories of the dead.

== Background ==
The show is about an assistant working at the Roth-Lobdow Center for Advanced Research on Project Cyclops, which involves experiencing the last few moments of a dead subject. Lee Pace does the narrations throughout the podcast. The podcast debuted at the end of October 2016 as a production of the Paragon Collective and AMC's streaming service Shudder. The show ended in 2018. The podcast is both a horror podcast and also a science fiction podcast. The show used binaural recording to create 3D audio effects.

== Reception ==
According to TechCrunch, the show received over 4.5 million downloads by the end of September 2017. According to the Daily Utah Chronicle, the podcast had a 4.5 out of 5 stars on Apple Podcasts in February 2018. Megan Summers wrote in Screen Rant that the show is "horror audio drama at its best." Simon Hill wrote in Wired that the show was a "memorably thrilling ride." Freddy McConnell commented on episode number six entitled "Horns Limo Service," saying that the episode "has stomach-turning sound effects and brilliantly blunt forensic pathologist chat." In her Podcast Magazine review, Michele Pariza Wacek criticized the podcast for the use of narration because the narration was an unexplained component of the show that interrupted the flow of the story. Chelsea Tatham wrote in the Tampa Bay Times that the podcast "feels like a television show for your ears."
