= Gallery of Fear =

- Directed by: Alan Rowe Kelly; Anthony G. Summer
- Screenplay by: Alan Rowe Kelly
- Based on: "Gallery of Fear" by Doug Smith
- Starring: Debbie Rochon; Raine Brown; Susan Adriensen
- Distributed by: Southpaw Pictures; Tiny Core Pictures
- Release date: 2013
- Country: United States
- Language: English

Gallery of Fear is a 2013 horror anthology film, directed by Alan Rowe Kelly and Anthony G. Summer. Kelly also wrote the screenplay for the film based on a story by Doug Smith. The film stars Debbie Rochon, Raine Brown and Susan Adriensen.

The film was distributed by Southpaw Pictures and Tiny Core Pictures.

== Plot ==
A four-part horror anthology. The four segments are "Critics Choice," "By Her Hand, She Draws You Down," "Down the Drain" and "A Far Cry from Home."
