= Adrienne King =

American actress (born 1955/1956)

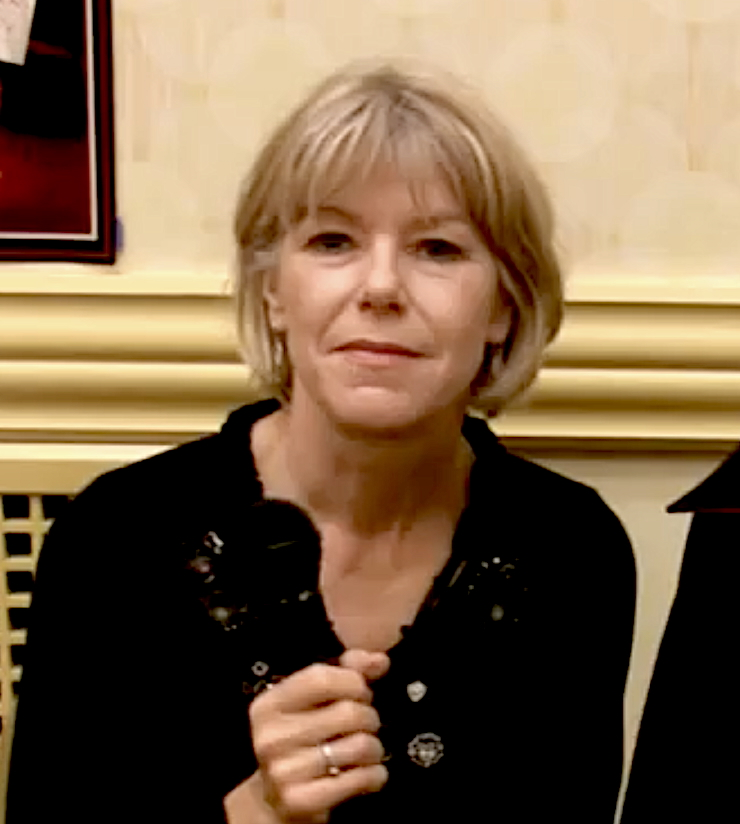
- King in 2009
- Born: July 21, during the mid-1950s (age 70–71); Oyster Bay, New York, U.S.
- Education: Fashion Institute of Technology; Royal Academy of Dramatic Art
- Occupations: Actress; artist; winemaker
- Years active: 1965–present
- Spouse: Richard Hassanein (m. 1987)
- Website: adrienneking.com

Adrienne King (born July 21, c. 1955–1956 (Note: King has publicly acknowledged her birthday is July 21, but sources vary regarding her birth year, with some sources indicating 1960. Per the autobiography on her official website, King writes that she was nine years old when she appeared in the television film Inherit the Wind, released in 1965, while a March 2018 article in The Columbus Dispatch dates King as 62 years old at that time; this would indicate a birth year of approximately 1955 or 1956.)) is an American actress, visual artist, and winemaker. She is known for her portrayal of Alice Hardy in the slasher film Friday the 13th (1980) and its sequel, Friday the 13th Part 2 (1981). Born and raised in Oyster Bay, New York, King was placed in commercials by her mother beginning at six months old, and worked as a child actor in her early years. She made her film debut in the television film Inherit the Wind (1965), followed by uncredited appearances in Between the Lines (1977), Saturday Night Fever (1977), and Hair (1979).

After starring in Friday the 13th and Friday the 13th Part 2, King retreated from acting when she became the target of a stalker who harassed her over the course of a year, eventually breaking into her home. She relocated to London in 1984 and studied at the Royal Academy of Dramatic Art before returning to the United States and working for three decades as an ADR looper on numerous studio films, as well as on seven seasons of the soap opera Melrose Place. Simultaneously, King continued developing her skills as a visual artist.

In 2010, she returned to acting in the low-budget horror film Psychic Experiment. King followed this with roles in The Butterfly Room (2012), Tales of Poe (2014), Killer Therapy (2019), and the Friday the 13th fan film Jason Rising (2021). In 2023, King was attached to the forthcoming Peacock series, Crystal Lake, a prequel series to the original 1980 film, but did not appear in the finished show.

King has also had ventures in art and winemaking: In 2010, she began working as a wine purveyor after partnering with Valley View Vineyards in Oregon's Rogue Valley, curating and selling Crystal Lake Wines themed after Friday the 13th, as well as selling her own paintings. In 2021, she provided voice narration for the audiobook version of Grady Hendrix's novel The Final Girl Support Group (2021).

== Early life ==
King was born July 21 in the mid-1950s in Oyster Bay, Long Island, New York. Her mother, who was originally from Liverpool, England, put her into acting at 6 months old in commercials alongside her brother and sister, something she describes as her not having much control over. Her first appearance was in a commercial for Ivory soap. King was raised Catholic and attended a Catholic school.

== Career ==
=== 1965–1979: Early work ===
In 1965, around age nine, King appeared in the television film Inherit the Wind in a supporting role. Beginning in ninth grade, she began auditioning for films in New York City: "As long as I kept my grades up, everyone was cool with it," she recalled.

She soon began training under Bill Esper, a student of acting instructor Sanford Meisner. She began to obtain parts in soap operas, Off-off-Broadway productions, and in several television commercials most notably Burger King advertising. Additionally, she worked as a dancer in the films Saturday Night Fever (1977) and Hair (1979). She also had a small supporting role in the comedy film Between the Lines (1977). During this time, she studied and graduated from New York's Fashion Institute of Technology with a degree in fine arts.

=== 1980–2008: Friday the 13th and aftermath ===
In 1979, while King was appearing in a commercial for Burger King, she was referred to producer Sean S. Cunningham through a mutual friend for a role in his directorial debut, the horror film Friday the 13th. Cunningham, impressed by King's naturalistic acting, felt she embodied the qualities of the film's lead heroine, Alice Hardy, and cast her in the film. Friday the 13th was a major box-office success, grossing nearly $60 million worldwide. The following year, she reprised her role as Alice Hardy in the sequel Friday the 13th Part 2, in which the character meets her demise during the film's opening sequence. King's character of Alice has been retrospectively assessed as a "standardization" of the "final girl" template in slasher films following the Laurie Strode character in Halloween (1978).

After the release of Friday the 13th and during the shooting of Friday the 13th Part 2, King was repeatedly harassed by a male stalker, which led her to recede from the public. Her last on-camera screen appearance at that time was a commercial for Downy which she filmed in 1983. Subsequently, King was hired as a stunt performer and background actor for the Ivan Reitman film Ghostbusters (1984), having been acquainted with the stunt coordinator Cliff Cudney.

She subsequently relocated to London in 1984, where she enrolled for a summer program at the Royal Academy of Dramatic Art, studying voice and dance. Upon finishing her studies, she returned to the United States, settling in Los Angeles. Reluctant to appear onscreen, King reemerged doing voice acting and ADR work, first for Mel Gibson's The Man Without a Face, and the Lasse Hallström-directed drama What's Eating Gilbert Grape? (both 1993). She continued to provide voice work for numerous Hollywood productions throughout the 1990s, including Philadelphia (1993), The Pelican Brief (1993), Wolf (1994), Cameron Crowe's Jerry Maguire (1996), and James Cameron's Titanic (1997). She would later state: "Voiceover work saved me. There's no question it came all around full circle, and I'm a better, more compassionate and stronger actor and artist."

In 2008, King was inducted into the Horror Hall of Fame at the Phoenix Film Festival.

=== 2009–present: Film and other ventures ===
In 2008, she signed on to the science fiction horror film under the title Walking Distance, which would later be retitled Psychic Experiment, marking her first onscreen film appearance in 25 years since her work as an extra in Ghostbusters in 1984. King described her role as a strong female lead and liked the script but was dissatisfied with the edited film. However, the experience on the set of this film made her realize that she missed acting. In 2012, she starred in the Welsh Christmas horror film Silent Night, Bloody Night: The Homecoming, an unofficial sequel to the American horror film Silent Night, Bloody Night (1972) and The Butterfly Room. In 2018, King portrayed Jackie Winters, an investigative reporter, in the horror film William Froste and Theresa in the short film Admonition.

Beginning in 2010, King also worked as a winemaker and wine company coordinator for Valley View Vineyards in southern Oregon. She has sold her own line of Friday the 13th-themed wines through the company, called Crystal Lake Wines, as well as paintings. In 2011, she had a supporting role in the independent horror film All American Bully, released in 2015.

In 2021, King reprised her role as Alice Hardy in the medium-length horror fan film Jason Rising. The same year, she recorded the voice narration for the audiobook version of The Final Girl Support Group by Grady Hendrix.

On October 31, 2022, a Friday the 13th prequel series was announced, titled Crystal Lake. At the time, it was to be written and executive produced by Bryan Fuller and Victor Miller, along with executive producers Marc Toberoff and Rob Barsamian, with A24 serving as the studio behind the series for the streaming service Peacock. In January 2023, King was attached to the project in a recurring undisclosed role. Writing for the series was slated to begin in late January 2023 with Kevin Williamson writing one episode for season one. On May 6, 2024, unconfirmed reports indicated that the series was no longer happening; however the following day, Bloody Disgusting confirmed that it was, with retooling of the project taking place behind-the-scenes.

== Personal life ==
After the success of Friday the 13th, King was pursued by a male stalker who managed to learn areas she frequented, where she exercised, and ate lunch. The man took Polaroid photographs of King that he would slip under the door of her New York City apartment, and at one point, broke into her apartment and defaced her artwork. On one occasion, the man confronted her in her apartment and held a gun to her head. The assailant was apprehended and spent some time imprisoned, but the incident traumatized King, prompting her to leave the public eye for many years. Reflecting on the incident in a 2016 interview, King said:

It kind of changed the game for me, because instead of thinking of my next move I was thinking about staying alive. Back in 1980, it was quite the endeavour. Think about it: there were no cellphones, very few video cameras around. I was getting Polaroids under my door of what I had been doing the night before. Of course, having no laws against stalking at the time—not until [1990] when poor Rebecca Schaeffer was killed by one of her fans—I was basically [dealing with this] alone.

King married Robert Tuckman on November 29, 1981. She later married Richard Hassanein, founder of United Film Distributors, in 1987. Since 2005, she has resided with her husband in Oregon's Rogue Valley.

== Filmography ==
=== Film ===
Year	Title	Role	Notes	Ref.
1965	Inherit the Wind	Melinda	Television film	
1977	Between the Lines	Young Lady	Uncredited	
1977	Saturday Night Fever	Dancer	Uncredited	
1979	Hair	Dancer	Uncredited	
1980	Friday the 13th	Alice Hardy		
1981	Friday the 13th Part 2	Alice Hardy		
1984	Friday the 13th: The Final Chapter	Alice Hardy	Archive footage	
1984	Ghostbusters	Extra	Stunt performer; uncredited	
1993	The Man Without a Face		Voice looping	
1993	Sleepless in Seattle		ADR	
1993	The Age of Innocence		Voice looping	
1993	The Good Son		Voice looping	
1993	Carlito's Way		ADR	
1993	The Pelican Brief		Voice looping	
1993	What's Eating Gilbert Grape		Voice looping	
1993	Philadelphia		Voice looping	
1994	The Paper		ADR	
1994	Wolf		Voice looping	
1994	Imaginary Crimes		ADR	
1995	Outbreak		ADR, voice looping	
1995	While You Were Sleeping		ADR	
1995	Indictment: The McMartin Trial		ADR	
1995	Nixon		ADR, voice looping	
1996	Jerry Maguire		Voice looping	
1997	Murder at 1600		ADR, voice looping	
1997	Titanic		ADR, voice looping	
1997	MouseHunt		Voice looping	
2000	Almost Famous		Voice looping	
2001	James Dean		Voice looping	
2010	Psychic Experiment	Louise Strack		
2011	All American Bully	Principal Kane		
2012	The Butterfly Room	Rachel		
2012	Gabby's Wish	Angela		
2013	Silent Night, Bloody Night: The Homecoming	The Stranger	Voice role	
2013	This Is the End		Voice looping; uncredited	
2014	Tales of Poe	Queen of Dreams / Private Nurse		
2018	Admonition	Theresa	Short film	
2018	William Froste	Jackie Winters		
2019	Killer Therapy	Mrs. Perkins		
2021	Jason Rising	Alice Hardy	Fan film	
2022	The Dead Girl in Apartment 03	Detective Richards		

=== Television ===
Year	Title	Role	Notes	Ref.
1992–1999	Melrose Place		Voice looping; 7 seasons	

== Sources ==
- Bracke, Peter (2006). Crystal Lake Memories: The Complete History of Friday the 13th. London, England: Titan Books. ISBN 978-1-845-76343-5.
- Grove, David (2005). Making Friday the 13th: The Legend of Camp Blood. Godalming, England: FAB Press. ISBN 978-1-903-25431-8.
- Kerswell, Justin (March 18, 2012). "Episode 31: Friday the 13th – Adrienne King Interview Segment". The Hysteria Continues! (Podcast). Event occurs at 1:20:39–2:08:09 – via YouTube.
- Norman, Jason (2014). Welcome to Our Nightmares: Behind the Scene with Today's Horror Actors. Jefferson, North Carolina: McFarland & Company. ISBN 978-0-786-47986-3.
- Petridis, Sotiris (2019). Anatomy of the Slasher Film: A Theoretical Analysis. Jefferson, North Carolina: McFarland & Company. ISBN 978-1-476-67431-5.
- Williams, Tony (2015). "Trying to Survive on the Darker Side: 1980s Family Horror". In Grant, Barry Keith (ed.). The Dread of Difference: Gender and the Horror Film. Austin, Texas: University of Texas Press. ISBN 978-1-477-30242-2.
