= Monster-Mania Con =

Horror film fan convention in the United States

- Status: Active
- Genre: Horror film
- Venue: DoubleTree Hotel; Greater Philadelphia Expo Center; Hilton Hotel
- Locations: Cherry Hill, New Jersey; Oaks, Pennsylvania; Baltimore, Maryland
- Country: United States
- Inaugurated: September 26, 2003; 23 years ago
- Organizer: Dave Hagan Enterprises
- Website: monstermania.net

Monster-Mania Con is a semi-annual horror film and memorabilia fan convention held in the United States, operating since 2003. It is focused on guest panels, where attendees of the convention can meet actors, primarily ones who have acted in horror films. It is a three-day event held at the DoubleTree Hotel (formerly Crowne Plaza and later Cherry Hill Hotel) in Cherry Hill, New Jersey, Hilton Baltimore Inner Harbor Hotel in Baltimore, Maryland, and Greater Philadelphia Expo Center in Oaks, Pennsylvania.

== History ==
During a car ride, Dave Hagan and his son created the idea of a horror convention. By the end of the ride, the two had come up with the main structure for Monster-Mania. Monster-Mania was founded in 1999 by Dave Hagan through Dave Hagan Enterprises, dedicated to his father, who introduced Dave to horror movies. Monster-Mania's first convention was held in 2003, in Clarion Hotel and Conference Center in Cherry Hill, New Jersey. The show's lineup included Doug Bradley, Caroline Munro, Ben Chapman, Veronica Carlson, amongst many others.

Monster-Mania Con was cancelled in 2020 due to the COVID-19 pandemic, and was hosted outdoors in Oaks, Pennsylvania on May 22, 2021.

After thirteen years of hosting the convention in Hunt Valley, Maryland, Monster-Mania was forced to relocate due to the closure of the Delta Marriott Hotel. Proceeding this, Monster-Mania relocated to the Hilton Baltimore Inner Harbor Hotel in Baltimore, Maryland.

== Events ==
Monster-Mania Con's is focused on guest panels, where one can meet actors primarily from horror-related media (e.g. Nick Castle, the actor who first portrayed Michael Myers in the Halloween franchise). There are also vendors, film presentations, previews, photo ops, music performances, and Q&As with select guests, along with an auction for Yorkie dogs.

== Locations and dates ==
No.	Dates	Location	Guests	Notes
1	September 26–28, 2003	Clarion Hotel and Conference Center; Cherry Hill, NJ	The Chiodo Brothers, Betsy Palmer, Doug Bradley, Kane Hodder, Ben Chapman, Julie Adams, Hazel Court, Caroline Munro, Veronica Carlson, Yvonne Monlaur, James O'Barr, Linnea Quigley, Debbie Rochon, Joe Bob Briggs, Bill Hinzman, Vincent DiFate, Doreen Zawislak, Don Reese, Carpathian, Neil Vokes, Ed Long & Damien Glonek, Ted A. Bohus, Jason Henderson, Bella Morte, Bouchard, Dunaway, & Smith, After & Forever, Steve Gostelow, Ghoul-A-Go-Go	Dedicated to Peter Cushing and Joseph Zawislak
2	August 27–29, 2004	Hilton Hotel; Cherry Hill, NJ	Robert Englund, Ken Kirzinger, Candace Hilligoss, Roger Corman, Robert Quarry, Ricou Browning, Ben Chapman, Tony Todd, C.J. Graham, Sid Haig, Dick Warlock, Gunnar Hansen, Alex Vincent, Danielle Harris, Betsy Palmer, Lisa Wilcox, Ingrid Pitt, Caroline Munro, Hazel Court, Verne Troyer, Deana, Sharon Ceccatti Hill & Clayton Hill, Robert Tinnell, Todd Livingston, & Neil Vokes, Don Reese, Ted Bohus, Vincent DiFate, Carpathian and the Patient Creatures, Ed Long & Damien Glonek, Alexxus Young, Bouchard, Dunaway, & Smith	Dedicated to Vincent Price and Joseph Zawislak
3	May 20–22, 2005	Hilton Hotel; Cherry Hill, NJ	Robert Englund, Heather Langenkamp, John Saxon, Amanda Wyss, Lisa Wilcox, Dee Snider, Kelly Stables, Angus Scrimm, Cassandra Peterson, Doug Bradley, The Chiodo Brothers, Ellen Sandweiss, Sarah York, Betsy Baker, Hal Delrich, Tom Sullivan, Andrew Bryniarski, Bill Johnson, Janet Ann Gallow, Sid Haig, Michael Berryman, Ari Lehman, Betsy Palmer, Mick Foley, Jasmin St. Claire, Wendy Kremer, Christa Campbell, Alex Vincent, Deana, James O'Barr, Alexxus Young, Don Reese, Vincent DiFate, Damian Maffei, Tim Sullivan, Joe Knetter, Mike Wolfer	
4	August 27–29, 2005	Hilton Hotel; Cherry Hill, NJ	Wes Craven, Sean S. Cunningham, R. Lee Ermey, Chris Sarandon, Adrienne Barbeau, Jonathan Breck, Miko Hughes, Sid Haig & Bill Moseley, Butch Patrick, Bill Hinzman, Kyra Schon, Victoria Sanchez, C.J. Graham, Vincent DiFate, James O'Barr, Alex Vincent, Leonard Lies, Mike Wolfer, Alexxus Young, Joe Knetter, Deanna, Troma Films, Debbie Rochon, Jasmine St. Claire, Dick Warlock, Jim Winburn, Tom Morga, Don Shanks, Chris Durand, George Wilbur, Brad Loree, Nancy Loomis, Charles Cyphers, Danielle Harris, Pamela Susan Shoop, Leo Rossi, Lance Warlock	
5	May 19–21, 2006	Hilton Hotel; Cherry Hill, NJ	Lance Henriksen, George A. Romero, Diamond Dallas Page, Sid Haig, Bill Moseley, Doug Bradley, Nicholas Vince, Simon Bamford, Barbie Wilde, Ashley Laurence, Peter Atkins, Gary J. Tunnicliffe, Kane, Jeffrey Combs, Richard Brooker, David Naughton, Jennifer Baxter, Greg Nicotero, Andrew Divoff, Charles Band, Eileen Dietz, Tony Todd, Tim Thomerson, Vincent DiFate, Ricou Browning, Alex Vincent, Howard Sherman (aka Sherman Howard), Joe Knetter	
6	August 25–27, 2006	Crowne Plaza; Cherry Hill, NJ	Shawnee Smith, Robert Englund, Eddie Furlong, Roddy Piper, Ernie Hudson, Brooke McCarter, Billy Wirth, Jamison Newlander, Chance Michael Corbitt, Jennifer Rubin, Rodney Eastman, Ken Sagoes, Linnea Quigley, Don Calfa, Beverly Randolph, Ari Lehman, Steve Dash (aka Steve Daskewisz), Richard Brooker, Ted White, Dick Wieand, C.J. Graham, Kane Hodder, Ken Kirzinger, Betsy Palmer, Adrienne King, Dana Kimmell, Kimberly Beck, Lar Park Lincoln, Erin Gray, Larry Zerner, Kevin Spirtas, Corey Feldman, Courtney Gains, Leslie Easterbrook, Angela Bettis, Yvonne Monlaur, Vincent DiFate, Michael Berryman, Mike Wolfer, Ronee Blakley	
7	February 16–18, 2007	Crowne Plaza; Cherry Hill, NJ	Tobin Bell, Leigh Whannell, Shawnee Smith, Noam Jenkins, Debra McCabe, Tim Burd, J. Larose, Barry Flatman, Tony Nappo, Crispin Glover, Fred Dekker, Duncan Regehr, Andre Gower, Ashley Bank, Ryan Lambert, Tom Woodruff Jr., Tom Noonan, William Forsythe, Sid Haig, Bill Moseley, Kane Hodder, Tom Savini, Warrington Gillette, Darcy Demoss, Jack Marks, Emily Perkins, Gunnar Hansen, Ian Whyte, Tom Woodruff Jr., Patricia Quinn, Bud Davis, Caroline Munro, Tom Atkins, Vincent DiFate, Conard Brooks, Scott L. Schwartz, Judy Sowinski, The Iron Sheik, Lou Albano, Afa the Wild Samoan, Alex Vincent, Mike Wolfer, April Monique Burril, Alexxus Young, Dave Tango, Steve Gonsalves, Brian Harnois	
8	May 18–20, 2007	Crowne Plaza; Cherry Hill, NJ	Matthew Lillard, Tyler Mane, Brad Dourif, Chris Durand, P.J. Soles, Amy Steel, Andrew Bryniarski, Cerina Vincent, Barbara Nedeljakova, Steve Dash (aka Steve Daskewisz), Courtney Gains, Lisa Wilcox, Jeff Fahey, Electra & Elise Avellan, Vincent DiFate, Lloyd Kaufman, Charlie Band, Mike Wolfer, Melissa Bacelar, Dave Tango, Donna Lacroix, Steve Gonsalves, Brian Harnois, Scott Reiniger, David Emge, Ken Foree, Gaylen Ross, Gary Klar, Eugene Clark, Bill Moseley, William Forsythe, Sid Haig, Michael Berryman, Priscilla Barnes, Ken Foree, Tyler Mane,	
9	August 24–26, 2007	Crowne Plaza; Cherry Hill, NJ	Karen Black, Angus Scrimm, Reggie Bannister, Stephen Geoffreys, Tony Todd, Warwick Davis, Danny Trejo, E.G. Daily, Tom Savini, Judah Friedlander, Droz, John Dugan, C.J. Graham, David Harris, Gary Klar, Harry Manfredini, Chris Sarandon, Catherine Hicks, Alex Vincent, Amanda Bearse, Sid Haig, Bill Moseley, Michael Berryman, Tommy Lee Wallace, George P. Wilbur, Don Shanks, Daeg Faerch, Chris Durand, Tony Moran, Brad Loree, Brian Andrews, Danielle Harris, John Michael Graham, Hanna Hall, Eric Preston	
10	March 14–16, 2008	Crowne Plaza; Cherry Hill, NJ	JoBeth Williams, Corey Feldman, Malcolm McDowell, Heather Langenkamp, Jason Mewes, Amanda Plummer, Daeg Faerch, Susie Feldman, Roddy Piper, Ricou Browning, Tom Savini, Megan Franich, Bill Moseley, Sid Haig, Tony Moran, Thomas G. Waites, John Morghen, Butch Patrick, Rick Domeier, Jennifer Rhodes, Ira Heiden, Gunnar Hansen, Teri McMinn, Edwin Neal, Allen Danzinger, Marilyn Burns, John Dugan, Matthew Ashford, Nick G. Miller	Dedicated to Ben Chapman
11	August 22–24, 2008	Crowne Plaza; Cherry Hill, NJ	Robert Englund, Corey Feldman, Corey Haim, Heather Langenkamp, Lisa Wilcox, Andras Jones, Brooke Theiss, Toy Newkirk, Ken Sagoes, Rodney Eastman, Penelope Sudrow, Lin Shaye, Tyler Mane, Jeffrey Combs, A. Michael Baldwin, Jason Mewes, Ellie Cornell, Danielle Harris, John Kassir, Derek Mears, Kane Hodder, Coralina Cataldi-Tassoni, Keir Dullea, Tom Savini, Jake Busey, Susie Feldman, C. J. Graham, Jamison Newlander, Brooke McCarter, Billy Wirth, Chance Michael Corbitt, Gerard McMahon	
12	March 13–15, 2009	Crowne Plaza; Cherry Hill, NJ	Alice Cooper, Fairuza Balk Lance Henriksen, Walter Phelan, Caroline Williams, Chris Carnel, Dennis Dunaway, Michael Bruce, Neal Smith, Rochelle Davis, Ken Haeser, Buzz Hasson, Scott Jackson, Steve Gonsalves, Brian Harnois, Dave Tango, Thommy Hutson, Anthony Masi, Tobe Hooper, Craig Singer, Lloyd Kaufman, Kristina Klebe, Reggie Bannister, Kat Lester, Don Coscarelli, Bill Thornbury, Betsy Palmer, Derek Mears, America Olivio, Steve Dash, Travis Van Winkle, Arlen Escarpeta, Amy Steel, John Furey, Stu Charno, John Otrin, Jensen Daggett, VC Dupree, C.J. Graham, Camilla and Carey More, Judie Aronson, Richard Brooker, Robbi Morgan	
N/A	June 12-14, 2009	Crowne Plaza; Cromwell, CT	Robert Englund, Heather Langenkamp, Bruce Campbell, John Saxon, Ronee Blakely, Amanda Wyss, Jsu Garcia, Tuesday Knight, Robert Rusler, Marshall Bell, Charles Fleischer, Betsy Baker, Ellen Sandweiss, Sarah York, Derek Mears, Tony Moran, Chris Sarandon, Sid Haig, Betsy Palmer, Richard Brooker, C.J. Graham, Jason Mewes, Ricou Browning, Michael Bruce, Neal Smith, G Tom Mac	Non-main show
13	August 21–23, 2009	Crowne Plaza; Cherry Hill, NJ	John Astin, Adam West, John Landis, Michael Biehn, Barbara Steele, Kelly LeBrock, Paul DeAngelo, Karen Fields, Jonathan Tiersten, Robert Hiltzik, Frank Saladino, Desiree Gould, Michael Berryman, James Duvall, Fred Dekker, Lisa Loring, Felix Silla, George Steele, Nikolai Volkoff, Tony Moran, Will Sandin, P.J. Soles, The Iron Sheik, David Naughton, Belinda Balaski, Dick Miller, Katharine Isabelle, Dee Wallace Stone, Derek Mears, Travis Van Winkle, Miguel A. Núñez Jr., Debi Sue Voorhees, Shavar Ross, Danny Steinmann, Carol Locatell, Ron Sloan	
14	March 12-14, 2010	Crowne Plaza; Cherry Hill, NJ	Malcolm McDowell, Eric Roberts, Mark Patton, Dario Argento, Doug Bradley, Gary Busey, Jake Busey, Spencer Wilding, Thom Matthews, Bruce Abbott, Kane Hodder, Bill Moseley, Kim Myers, Meg Foster, William Katt, Terrance Zdunich, Corbin Bernsen, Al Snow, Greg Valentine, Derek Graf, Chris Carnel, Jeannine Taylor, Spider One, Jeff Zornow, Scott Jackson, Ken Haeser, Buzz Hasson, Raine Brown, Charles Band, Joe Zaso, Bryan Norton, Neil Affleck, Al Humphreys, Lori Haller, Paul Kelman, Peter Cowper, Helene Udy, Tom Kovacs, Rob Stein, Jim Murchison, Damian Maffei, Joe Unger, Jay Woelfel	
15	August 20-22, 2010	Crowne Plaza; Cherry Hill, NJ	John Carpenter, Sean Patrick Flanery, Norman Reedus, David Della Rocco, Barbara Steele, Julian Sands, Felissa Rose, Dick Warlock, Udo Kier, Amelia Kinkade, Shon Greenblatt, Brad Greenquist, Denise Crosby, Dale Midkiff, Andrew Hubatsek, Miko Hughes, Lisa Wilcox, Danny Hassel, Beatrice Boepple, Erika Anderson, Kelly Jo Minter, Joe Seely, Marta Kober, Bill Randolph, Betsy Russel, Jake McKinnon, Michael Gordon, Tiffany Helm, Tom Fridley, William Forsyhre, Ty Mitchell, David Kagen, Amy Steel, Lloyd Kaufman, Erin Gray, Brian Andrews, Alex Vincent, Jeff Zornow, Ken Haeser, Buzz Hasson, Scott Jackson, Rob Dimension, Combat Zone Wrestling	
16	September 17-19, 2010	Marriott Hotel; Hunt Valley, MD	Robert Englund, Sean Patrick Flanery, Norman Reedus, David Della Rocco, Heather Langenkamp, John Saxon, Ken Sagoes, Ira Heiden, Jennifer Rubin, Rodney Eastman, Brooke Bundy, Melanie Kinnaman, Thom Matthews, Alan Trautman, Beverly Randolph, Brian Peck, Miguel A. Núñez Jr., Jewel Shepard, Don Calfa, Josh Philbin, Linnea Quigley, Melinda Clarke, Linda Blair, Tom Morga, Kane Hodder, Harvey Spencer Stephens, Ted White, Charles Herbert, Derek McKinnon, Monique Dupree, Charles Band, Jeff Zornow, Scott Jackson, Joe Zaso, Raine Brown, Bryan Norton	
17	March 11-13, 2011	Crowne Plaza; Cherry Hill, NJ	Nick Castle, Ace Frehley, Laurie Holden, Jon Bernthal, Steven Yeun, Dina Meyer, Fred Williamson, Lance Guest, Catherine Mary Stewart, Tommy Lee Wallace, R.A. Mihailoff, Jenny Wright, Melinda Clarke, David Hedison, James Darren, Roy Thinnes, John Amplas, Ricky Dean Logan, Jill Schoelen, Alvin Alexis, Kevin Tenney, Jill Terashita, Allison Barron, Courtney Gains, John Franklin, Allan Hyde, Doug Bradley, Kane Hodder, Karen "Stella" Scioli, Jeff Zornow, Scott Jackson, Ken Haeser, Buzz Hasson, Lloyd Kaufman, Debbie Rochon	
18	June 3-5, 2011	Marriott Hotel; Hunt Valley, MD	Sean S. Cunningham, Ari Lehman, Steve Dash, Richard Brooker, Dick Wieand, Johnny Hock, Kane Hodder, Ken Kirzinger, Paula Shaw, Doug Tait, Adrienne King, Jeannine Taylor, Ron Millkie, Amy Steel, John Furey, Lauren-Marie Taylor, Marta Kober, Bill Randolph, Russell Todd, Dana Kimmell, Catherine Parks, Kimberly Beck, Peter Barton, Erich Anderson, Judie Aronson, Melanie Kinnaman, Miguel A. Núñez Jr., Lar Park Jackson, Angus Scrimm, Lance Henriksen, Danny Steinman, Jeff Zornow, Scott Jackson, Rob Dimension	
19	August 19–21, 2011	Crowne Plaza; Cherry Hill, NJ	Cary Elwes, Sam Trammell, Michael Masse, Laurence Mason, Rochelle Davis, Adrian Kali Turner, Addy Miller, Andrew Rothenberg, Casper Van Dien, Lance Henriksen, Billy Bryan, Tony Cecere, Ernie Hudson, William Atherton, Tony Todd, Ted Raimi, Bob Elmore, Joe Turkel, Kristina Klebe, Sam J. Jones, Gil Gerard, Erin Gray, Nick Mennell, Chris Sarandon, William Ragsdale, Danielle Harris, Lloyd Kaufman, Michael McCleary, Eddie Furlong, Glen Hetrick, Paula Shaw, Jeff Zornow, Scott Jackson, Steve Gonsalves, Dave Tango, Roxsy Tyler, Tom Detrik, Nathan Baesel, Richard J. Walters, Boyd Banks, Alex Vincent, Rob Dimension	
20	September 16-18, 2011	Marriott Hotel; Hunt Valley, MD		
21	March 9-11, 2012	Crowne Plaza; Cherry Hill, NJ		
22	August 17–19, 2012	Crowne Plaza; Cherry Hill, NJ		
23	September 28–30, 2012	Hunt Valley Inn; Hunt Valley, MD		
24	March 8–10, 2013	Crowne Plaza; Cherry Hill, NJ		
25	August 16–18, 2013	Crowne Plaza; Cherry Hill, NJ		
26	September 27-29, 2013	Hunt Valley Inn; Hunt Valley, MD		
27	March 7–9, 2014	Crowne Plaza; Cherry Hill, NJ		
28	August 15–17, 2014	Crowne Plaza; Cherry Hill, NJ		
29	October 3–5, 2014	Hunt Valley Inn; Hunt Valley, MD		
30	March 13–15, 2015	Crowne Plaza; Cherry Hill, NJ		
31	July 31–August 2, 2015	Crowne Plaza; Cherry Hill, NJ		
32	October 2–4, 2015	Hunt Valley Inn; Hunt Valley, MD		
33	March 11–13, 2016	Crowne Plaza; Cherry Hill, NJ		
34	August 12–14, 2016	Crowne Plaza; Cherry Hill, NJ		
35	September 30–October 2, 2016	Hunt Valley Inn; Hunt Valley, MD		
36	March 10–12, 2017	Crowne Plaza; Cherry Hill, NJ		
37	August 18–20, 2017	Crowne Plaza; Cherry Hill, NJ		
38	September 29–October 1, 2017	Delta Hotels; Hunt Valley, MD		
39	March 9–11, 2018	Crowne Plaza; Cherry Hill, NJ		
40	August 17–19, 2018	Crowne Plaza; Cherry Hill, NJ		
41	September 28–30, 2018	Delta Hotels; Hunt Valley, MD		
42	March 8–10, 2019	Crowne Plaza; Cherry Hill, NJ		
43	August 16–18, 2019	Crowne Plaza; Cherry Hill, NJ		
44	October 4–6, 2019	Delta Hotels; Hunt Valley, MD		
45	August 21–23, 2020	Crowne Plaza; Cherry Hill, NJ		Cancelled due to COVID-19
N/A	May 22–23, 2021	Greater Philadelphia Expo Center; Oaks, PA		Non-main show. Hosted outdoors.
46	August 13–15, 2021	Crowne Plaza; Cherry Hill, NJ		
47	September 24–26, 2021	Delta Hotels; Hunt Valley, MD		
48	October 22–24, 2021	Greater Philadelphia Expo Center; Oaks, PA		
49	March 11–13, 2022	Cherry Hill Hotel; Cherry Hill, NJ		
50	August 12–14, 2022	Cherry Hill Hotel; Cherry Hill, NJ		
51	September 30–October 2, 2022	Delta Hotels; Hunt Valley, MD		
52	November 11–13, 2022	Greater Philadelphia Expo Center; Oaks, PA		
53	March 10–12, 2023	Doubletree Hotel; Cherry Hill, NJ		
54	April 14–16, 2023	Delta Hotels; Hunt Valley, MD		
55	August 4–6, 2023	Doubletree Hotel; Cherry Hill, NJ		
56	October 13–15, 2023	Delta Hotels; Hunt Valley, MD		Final show at Delta Hotels in Hunt Valley due to the building's closure
57	November 10–12, 2023	Greater Philadelphia Expo Center; Oaks, PA		
