= Alfie Wise =

American film and television actor (1942–2025)

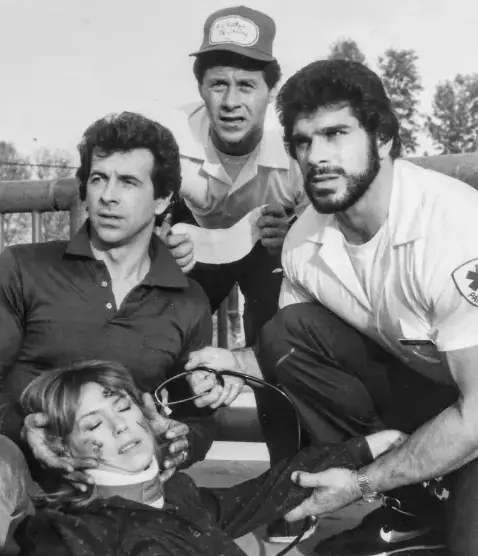
- Wise (center) with James Naughton, Lou Ferrigno and Katia Christine in Trauma Center, 1983
- Born: Ralph Louis Wise Jr. November 17, 1942; Altoona, Pennsylvania, U.S.
- Died: July 22, 2025 (aged 82); Palm Beach, Florida, U.S.
- Education: Pennsylvania State University
- Occupations: Film and television actor
- Years active: 1972–2000
- Spouse: Stephanie Bliss

Ralph Louis Wise Jr. (November 17, 1942 – July 22, 2025) was an American film and television actor.

== Life and career ==
Wise was born in Altoona, Pennsylvania, the son of Ralph Sr. and Miss Wise. He attended Keith Jr. High School and Altoona Area High School, graduating in 1960. After graduating, he attended Pennsylvania State University and served in the United States Navy. He began his screen career in 1972, appearing in the television film Call Her Mom. In the same year, he appeared in the CBS sitcom television series The Sandy Duncan Show.

Later in his career, in 1983, Wise starred as paramedic Sidney Pacelli in the ABC medical drama television series Trauma Center, starring along with James Naughton, Jack Bannon, Lou Ferrigno, Wendie Malick, Jayne Modean, Bill Randolph, Arlen Dean Snyder, Eileen Heckart and Dorian Harewood. He guest-starred in television programs including Mary Hartman, Mary Hartman, The Jeffersons and Tour of Duty, and played the recurring role of the wealthy computer wiz neighbor Oliver Wardell in the ABC detective drama television series B.L. Stryker. He also appeared in films such as Hooper, Hot Stuff, Smokey and the Bandit, Starting Over, City Heat, Paternity, Stroker Ace and The Cannonball Run, all films co-starring opposite Burt Reynolds. During his screen career, in 1985, he played the inhibited wimp Charlie Baker in the stage play The Foreigner.

Wise retired from acting in 2000, last appearing in the CBBC television series S Club 7 in Miami.

== Personal life and death ==
Wise was married to Stephanie Bliss. Their marriage lasted until Wise's death in 2025.

Wise died on July 22, 2025, at the Thomas H. Corey Veteran Affairs Medical Center in Palm Beach, Florida, at the age of 82.
