= Gorney =

Gorney is a surname. Notable people with the surname include:

- Jay Gorney (1894–1990), Polish-American songwriter
- Walt Gorney (1912–2004), Austrian-American actor
- Karen Lynn Gorney (born 1945), American actress
