= Where the Boys Are '84 =

1984 film by Hy Averback

- Theatrical release poster
- Directed by: Hy Averback
- Written by: Stu Krieger; Jeff Burkhart
- Based on: Where the Boys Are; 1960 novel by Glendon Swarthout
- Produced by: Allan Carr
- Starring: Lisa Hartman; Russell Todd; Lorna Luft; Wendy Schaal; Howard McGillin; Lynn-Holly Johnson; Alana Stewart; Christopher McDonald; Daniel McDonald
- Cinematography: James A. Contner
- Edited by: Bobbie Shapiro; Mel Shapiro
- Music by: Sylvester Levay
- Production company: ITC Productions
- Distributed by: Tri-Star Pictures
- Release date: April 6, 1984
- Running time: 95 minutes
- Country: United States
- Language: English
- Box office: $10,530,000 (USA) (sub-total)

Where the Boys Are '84 (onscreen title: Where the Boys Are) is a 1984 American sex comedy film that was directed by Hyman Jack "Hy" Averback (the last film he ever directed) and starred Lisa Hartman, Lorna Luft, Wendy Schaal, and Lynn-Holly Johnson. A remake of the 1960 film Where the Boys Are, it was produced by Allan Carr. It was the first film released by Tri-Star Pictures.

== Plot ==
Four female students from snowbound Penmore College in the Northeast head to Fort Lauderdale, Florida for spring break: Carole Singer is taking a vacation from her steady boyfriend Chip and winds up as a contender in a 'Hot Bod Contest'; Jennie Cooper is courted by both rich classical pianist Camden Roxbury III, and devil-may-care rocker Scott Nash; Sandra Roxbury is looking for 'Mr. Right'; and Laurie Jameson, a sex crazed nymphomaniac, who dreams of a night of unbridled passion with a real 'He-Man', ends up getting her wish, through an unexpected source.

During the week-long festivities, the young women meet Sandra's snobbish aunt Barbara Roxbury and her friend Maggie and get to sample much of Fort Lauderdale's nightlife. They are also invited to a formal party at Barbara's house, which ends up being crashed by hundreds of spring breakers.

== Cast ==
- Lisa Hartman as Jennie Cooper
- Russell Todd as Scott Nash
- Lorna Luft as Carole Singer
- Wendy Schaal as Sandra Roxbury
- Lynn-Holly Johnson as Laurie Jameson
- Howard McGillin as Chip
- Louise Sorel as Barbara Roxbury
- Alana Stewart as Maggie
- Christopher McDonald as Tony
- Daniel McDonald as Camden Roxbury III
- Jude Cole as Jude
- George Coutoupis as Ray
- Asher Brauner as Officer Ernie Grasso
- Frank Zagarino as Conan
- Dara Sedaka as Christine Lawson
- Barry Marder as Rappaport

== Production ==
Posters and advertising material presented the film's title as Where the Boys Are '84, the onscreen title is simply Where the Boys Are.

In an interview on the DVD, Wendy Schaal remembered it as a fun production with a party atmosphere, thanks to producer Allan Carr who was known for his parties. Schaal admitted they were smoking real marijuana in the beach funeral scene. Russell Todd's singing was dubbed by Peter Beckett, vocalist with Player and Little River Band.

Touted as a more "realistic" version of the popular 1960 film Where the Boys Are, with nudity and drug references, the date rape storyline of the original does not appear in this version. Where the Boys Are '84 was filmed from May 16 to June 26, 1983, at the following Florida locations: Royal Palm Yacht and Country Club in Boca Raton; Lauderdale Beach Hotel, Bootleggers and City Limits Nightclub in Fort Lauderdale and Young Circle Bandshell in Hollywood.

== Release ==
Where the Boys Are '84 was produced independently by ITC Productions and was distributed by Tri-Star Pictures after Universal Pictures rejected it. On April 3, 1984, it was screened at the National Theater in New York City with Allan Carr and the principal cast attending the premiere, as well as the post-premiere party at Studio 54.

The film was released nationwide on April 6, 1984, and was both a box office and critical flop. It ranked No. 5 at the US box office grossing $3.6 million on its opening weekend. Its total domestic gross was $10.5 million.

== Reception ==
Metacritic, which uses a weighted average, assigned the film a score of 10 out of 100, based on 5 critics, indicating "overwhelming dislike". Janet Maslin, writing for The New York Times, called the film "dumb, vulgar and mostly humorless." Roger Ebert, writing for The Chicago Sun-Times, reported, "It isn't a sequel and isn't a remake and isn't, in fact, much of anything." Reel Film Reviews' David Nusair wrote: "There's ultimately not a whole lot within Where the Boys Are worth embracing or getting excited about..."

== Accolades ==
Award	Category	Recipient	Result	Ref.
Golden Raspberry Awards	Worst Picture	Allan Carr	Nominated	
Golden Raspberry Awards	Worst Supporting Actress	Lynn-Holly Johnson	Won	
Golden Raspberry Awards	Worst Screenplay	Stu Krieger and Jeff Burkhart	Nominated	
Golden Raspberry Awards	Worst Musical Score	Sylvester Levay	Nominated	
Golden Raspberry Awards	Worst New Star	Russell Todd	Nominated	

== Soundtrack ==
Where the Boys Are '84: Music from the Motion Picture Soundtrack

Soundtrack album by various artists
- Released: April 1984
- Recorded: 1983
- Genre: Pop rock
- Label: RCA Records
- Producers: Denis Pregnolato; Louis St. Louis; Sylvester Levay; Sparks; Steve Smith

Singles from Where the Boys Are '84
- 1. "Where the Boys Are" Released: April 1984

Where the Boys Are '84: Music from the Motion Picture Soundtrack was released in April 1984 on vinyl and cassette tape by RCA Records. The soundtrack features ten songs, all of which appear in various scenes throughout the film. The title track cover version by Lisa Hartman was released as a single with the B-side "Hot Nights" by Jude Cole, however, it failed to chart. Lorna Luft recorded a disco version of "Where the Boys Are" released concurrently with the film although it was not a soundtrack item: produced by Joel Diamond, this version - credited mononymously to Lorna - featured background vocals by members of Village People.

Side A

1. "Hot Nights" – performed by Jude Cole
2. "Seven Day Heaven" – performed by Shandi
3. "Mini-Skirted" – performed by Sparks
4. "Be-Bop-a-Lula" – performed by The Rockats
5. "Jenny" – performed by Peter Beckett

Side B

1. "Where the Boys Are" – performed by Lisa Hartman
2. "Woman's Wise" – performed by The Rockats
3. "Girls Night Out" – performed by Toronto
4. "Slippin' & Slidin'" – performed by Phil Seymour
5. "All Fired Up" – performed by Rick Derringer

== Home media ==
The film was released on VHS by 20th Century Fox offshoot Key Video. The DVD release was marred by copyright disagreement between Tri-Star and ITC Productions. On February 6, 2018, Scorpion Releasing issued a remastered version of the film on Blu-ray, with DTS-HD Master Audio 2.0.

== See also ==
Spring Break, a 1983 film with a similar setting and tone
