= Penn & Teller Get Killed =

1989 film by Arthur Penn

- Theatrical release poster
- Directed by: Arthur Penn
- Written by: Penn Jillette; Teller
- Produced by: Timothy Marx; Arthur Penn
- Starring: Penn Jillette; Teller; Caitlin Clarke
- Cinematography: Jan Weincke
- Edited by: Jeffrey Wolf
- Music by: Paul Chihara
- Production company: Lorimar Film Entertainment
- Distributed by: Warner Bros.
- Release date: September 22, 1989
- Running time: 89 minutes
- Country: United States
- Language: English
- Budget: $8 million

Penn & Teller Get Killed is a 1989 black comedy film directed by Arthur Penn, starring the magicians Penn & Teller, who play themselves in a satirical account of what the audience would perhaps imagine them doing in their daily lives. Most of the action involves Penn and Teller playing practical jokes on each other and Penn's girlfriend, Carlotta (Caitlin Clarke). The final joke, as the title implies, has serious consequences for all three. It was the last theatrical film directed by Arthur Penn, and received mostly negative reviews from critics.

== Plot ==
Penn and Teller appear on a television show where Penn jokingly comments that he wishes someone were trying to kill him. Soon after, the magicians are off to a scheduled show in Atlantic City. At the airport, a religious zealot mockingly confronts Penn about his comments from the television show the night before. Teller and Carlotta play a prank on Penn while going through security and Penn gets back at Teller by planting a toy gun on him while at the airport.

After exposing fraudulent psychic surgery to Carlotta's wealthy Uncle Ernesto, Penn and Teller are kidnapped by angry Filipinos wishing revenge for damaging their reputation. Immediately before being brutally tortured, the situation is revealed to Penn as a birthday prank played by Teller, Carlotta and Uncle Ernesto.

Soon after, while leaving the theatre from their nightly performance, someone opens fire on Penn, shooting him in the arm. Teller is accused of hiring an assassin as a joke, but as time goes on it becomes clear that Teller is not part of the joke. Teller purchases a gun for self-defense and femme fatale Officer MacNamara vows to keep Penn safe from snipers.

Officer MacNamara announces that a nameless villain, a supposed vehement Penn & Teller fan who dresses and acts like Penn, has been arrested. Penn and Teller get to tour his bizarre apartment turned Penn & Teller shrine. Teller innocuously disposes of his gun in a trashcan of the apartment. Shortly after MacNamara departs, Penn is stabbed in the stomach by an assailant on the street. Penn rushes off to the hospital where, once Teller is out of sight, he appears perfectly fine. Teller proceeds to pursue the would-be assassin in a peculiar chase scene back to the apartment.

The madman, dressed as Penn, forces Teller to enact a Penn & Teller routine with him, hanging in gravity boots in front of a camera. He then uses duct tape to secure the hapless Teller to the gravity boot rig. Officer MacNamara returns and the assassin leaves to finish off Penn. MacNamara confesses to Teller her contempt of Penn and Teller. The confused Teller is able to grab the gun from the wastebasket and threatens MacNamara with it. He hears a voice behind him and as the individual grabs him, he shoots the individual only to realize it's Penn, who appears to fall over dead.

MacNamara laughs, thinking that it's a new joke. She then reveals herself as Carlotta. The implications of what has just happened suddenly catch up with them: The whole event had been a joke on Teller who turned everything around on the players. Teller, breaking silence for the first time, immediately thinks they switched the gun for a replica, but then realizes the gun he was holding is real and he just killed his partner. Teller turns the gun on himself.

Carlotta, stricken with grief, throws herself out the window. Upon returning to his apartment and finding everyone dead, the "hired assassin", realizing he'll certainly be implicated in the deaths, shoots himself. Others who come into the apartment and find the carnage shoot themselves. Gunshots are heard in the distance, while the Bee Gees song "I Started a Joke" plays in the background. In a voice-over, Penn explains this is the definitive end of it all.

== Cast ==
- Penn Jillette as himself
- Teller as himself
- Caitlin Clarke as Carlotta
- Celia McGuire as Officer McNamara
- David Patrick Kelly as The Fan
- Leonardo Cimino as Ernesto
- Bill Randolph as Floor Director
- Jon Cryer as Frat Boy
- Christopher Durang as Jesus Freak
- Tom Sizemore as Mugger
- James Randi as Rope Holder

== Reception ==
Quentin Tarantino has said that this film exemplifies the poor quality of directors' final movies.
