= Friday the 13th Part 2 =

1981 film by Steve Miner

- Theatrical release poster (Note: An advanced teaser poster bearing only the film's title was swiftly distributed to theaters after Paramount Pictures worried the original poster design spoiled the revelation of Jason Voorhees as the villain. A key art variation of the original design was subsequently issued as a final one-sheet, featuring a blackened silhouette image of a figure holding an axe. In the original version of this poster, the silhouette contained an image of Jason Voorhees attacking a woman in a boat on a lake.)
- Directed by: Steve Miner
- Written by: Ron Kurz
- Based on: Characters by Victor Miller
- Produced by: Steve Miner
- Starring: Adrienne King; Amy Steel; John Furey
- Cinematography: Peter Stein
- Edited by: Susan E. Cunningham
- Music by: Harry Manfredini
- Production company: Georgetown Productions Inc.
- Distributed by: Paramount Pictures
- Release date: May 1, 1981
- Running time: 87 minutes
- Country: United States
- Language: English
- Budget: $1.25 million
- Box office: $21.7 million

Friday the 13th Part 2 (Note: Though the film has sometimes been marketed with Roman numerals, its onscreen title is presented as Friday the 13th Part 2.) is a 1981 American slasher film produced and directed by Steve Miner in his directorial debut, written by Ron Kurz, and starring Adrienne King, Amy Steel, and John Furey. It is the sequel to Friday the 13th (1980), and the second installment in the Friday the 13th franchise. King, Betsy Palmer, and Walt Gorney reprise their respective roles from the first film as Alice Hardy, Pamela Voorhees, and Crazy Ralph. Taking place five years after the first film, Friday the 13th Part 2 follows a similar premise, with an unknown stalker killing a group of camp counselors at a training camp near Crystal Lake. The film marks the debut of Jason Voorhees as the series' main antagonist.

Originally, Friday the 13th Part 2 was intended to be an anthology film based on the Friday the 13th superstition. However, after the popularity of the original film's surprise ending, the filmmakers opted to continue the story and mythology surrounding Camp Crystal Lake, a trend that would be repeated in every film in the franchise.

Like the original film, Friday the 13th Part 2 faced opposition from the Motion Picture Association of America, who noted its "accumulative violence" as problematic, resulting in numerous cuts being made to allow an R rating. The film opened theatrically in New York, Los Angeles, and San Francisco on May 1, 1981. Friday the 13th Part 2 received negative reviews, and was less financially successful than the first film, grossing $21.7 million in the U.S. on a budget of $1.25 million. A direct sequel, Friday the 13th Part III, was released the following year.

== Plot ==
Two months after the murders at Camp Crystal Lake, (Note: As depicted in Friday the 13th (1980)) sole survivor Alice Hardy is recovering from her traumatic experience. In her apartment, when Alice opens the refrigerator to get her cat some food, she finds the severed head of Pamela Voorhees and is murdered with an ice pick to her temple by an unknown intruder.

In 1984, Paul Holt has opened a school for camp counselors on the shore of Crystal Lake. The camp is attended by Paul's assistant Ginny Field, Sandra, her boyfriend Jeff, Scott, Terry, the paraplegic Mark, Vickie, Ted, and many other trainees. Around the campfire that night, Paul tells the counselors the legend of Jason Voorhees, a boy who drowned at Camp Crystal Lake in 1957, sending his vengeful mother Pamela on two killing sprees in 1958 and 1980, until Alice eventually killed her in self-defense. According to the legend, Jason survived and is now living in the woods near Crystal Lake; enraged at Pamela's death, he will kill anyone he comes across. As Paul finishes the story, a man with a spear scares everyone, but it turns out to be Ted wearing a mask. Paul reassures everyone that Jason is dead and that Camp Crystal Lake is now condemned and off-limits.

That night, Crazy Ralph wanders onto the property and watches Ginny and Paul make out before being garroted from behind a tree by an unseen killer. The following day, Jeff and Sandra sneak off to Camp Crystal Lake, where they find a dog carcass, but they are caught by Deputy Winslow and return to the camp. Later, Winslow spots a man wearing a burlap sack mask running across the road. Winslow chases him into the woods and finds a shack. The man kills Winslow with a hammer claw.

Back at camp, Paul offers the others one last night in town before the training begins. Six of them stay behind, including Jeff and Sandra, who are forced to remain as punishment for sneaking off. At the bar, Ginny muses that if Jason were still alive and had witnessed Pamela's death, it may have left him with no distinction between life and death, or right and wrong. Paul dismisses the idea, proclaiming that Jason is nothing but an urban legend. Meanwhile, the assailant appears at the camp and kills the counselors, one by one. Scott has his throat slit with a machete while caught in a rope trap, and Terry is killed upon finding Scott's dead body. Mark has a machete slammed into his face and falls down a flight of stairs. The killer then moves upstairs and impales Jeff and Sandra with a spear as they have sex, then fatally stabs Vickie with a kitchen knife.

Ted stays behind at the bar while Ginny and Paul return to find the place in disarray. In the dark, the killer ambushes Paul and chases Ginny throughout the camp and into the woods, where she comes across the shack. After barricading herself inside, she finds an altar with Pamela Voorhees' severed head on it, surrounded by a pile of bodies which include Alice, Terry, and Winslow. Realizing that Jason Voorhees is the killer, Ginny puts on Pamela's sweater and tries to convince Jason that she is his mother psychologically. The ruse briefly works until Jason sees Pamela's head on the altar and breaks out of the trance. Paul suddenly returns and tries to save Ginny, but Jason incapacitates him. Just as Jason is about to kill Paul with a pickaxe, Ginny picks up a machete and slams it down into Jason's shoulder, seemingly killing him.

Paul and Ginny return to the cabin and hear someone outside. Thinking that Jason has followed them, they open the door, only to find Terry's dog, Muffin. Just as they sigh in relief, an unmasked Jason bursts through the window from behind and grabs Ginny. She then awakens to being loaded into an ambulance and calls out for Paul, who is nowhere to be seen, leaving his fate unknown. Back in the shack, Pamela's head remains on the altar, but Jason is nowhere to be found.

== Cast ==
- Amy Steel as Ginny Field
- John Furey as Paul Holt
- Adrienne King as Alice Hardy
- Kirsten Baker as Terry McCarthy
- Lauren-Marie Taylor as Vickie Perry
- Stu Charno as Ted Bowen
- Warrington Gillette as Jason Voorhees (unmasked)
  - Steve Daskewisz as Jason Voorhees (masked)
- Walt Gorney as Crazy Ralph
- Marta Kober as Sandra Dier
- Tom McBride as Mark Jarvis
- Bill Randolph as Jeff Dunsberry
- Russell Todd as Scott Cheney
- Betsy Palmer as Pamela Voorhees
- Cliff Cudney as Max
- Jack Marks as Deputy Winslow

== Production ==
=== Development ===
Following the success of Friday the 13th in 1980, Paramount Pictures began plans to make a sequel. First acquiring the worldwide distribution rights, Frank Mancuso, Sr. stated, "We wanted it to be an event, where teenagers would flock to the theaters on that Friday night to see the latest episode." The initial ideas for a sequel involved the Friday the 13th title being used for a series of films, released once a year, that would not have direct continuity with one another but be a separate "scary movie" in their own right. Phil Scuderi—one of three owners of Esquire Theaters, along with Steve Minasian and Bob Barsamian, who produced the original film—insisted that the sequel have Jason Voorhees, Pamela (Betsy Palmer)'s son, even though his appearance in the original film was only meant to be a joke.

Steve Miner, associate producer on the first film, believed in the idea and would go on to direct the first two sequels and the thirteenth film Jason (2027). At the time Friday the 13th Part 2 went into development, Cunningham opted not to direct as he was directing A Stranger Is Watching (1982). Miner would use many of the same crew members from the first film while working on the sequels. Cunningham had mixed feelings about the entire Friday the 13th enterprise that he outlined for film critic and author Stephen Hunter in an interview for a book Hunter wrote on violent films. Hunter stated that Cunningham "wasn't particularly proud" of his work on these films, and Cunningham bluntly said that the only thing that seemed to reach a teenaged audience at that time involved high levels of gore and graphic violence.

=== Casting ===
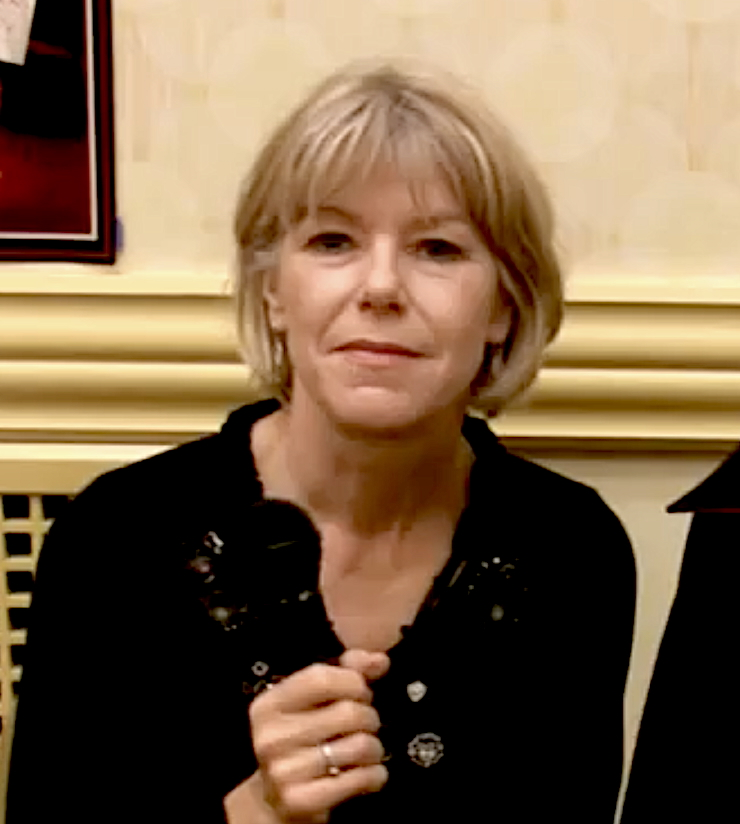
Adrienne King (pictured in 2009) reprises her role of Alice Hardy

Adrienne King was pursued by an obsessed fan after the success of the original Friday the 13th and purportedly wished her role as Alice Hardy to be as small as possible, though in the documentary Crystal Lake Memories: The Complete History of Friday the 13th, it was stated that King's agent had asked for a higher salary, which the studio could not afford.

The film's heroine, Ginny Field, is played by Amy Steel, who won the part through an audition. "At the time of [making the film], it was before the genre really picked up so I didn't give it a lot of credit or take it seriously. For me, it was just another audition because I had no idea what it would end up meaning after all this time. When I played Ginny, I was really young and different from a lot of the people working at the time so that came out in my character. I was naturally suspicious of cocky guys at that age, and you see a lot of that when I'm on screen with Paul (John Furey). I tried to put so much behind the actual words in the script just so she felt almost unreachable, to Paul and to audiences. I wanted her to have some power."

Gina Gershon was offered an unspecified role, but turned it down due to a "exploitive" topless scene.

Actor Warrington Gillette played Jason unmasked at the end of the film. Stuntman Steve Daskewisz (also known as Steve Dash) was credited as Jason Stunt Double but played the masked Jason throughout the rest of the film.

=== Filming ===
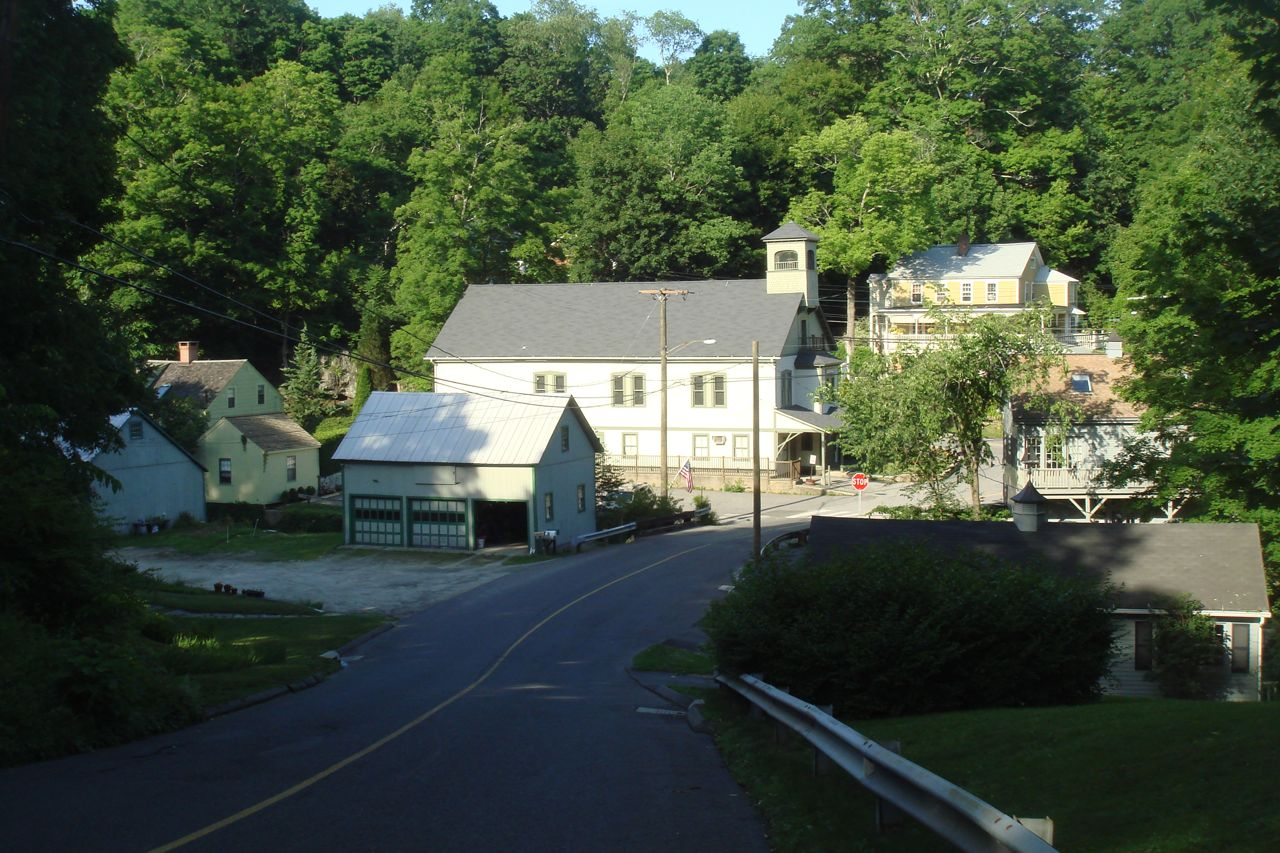
The village of New Preston, Connecticut was one of the filming locations

Principal photography of Friday the 13th Part 2 in September 1980, and finished in November 1980. Filming took place in Connecticut, primarily in New Preston and Kent, as well as at Kent Falls State Park. The opening scene of the film featuring Alice in her apartment was filmed inside a Torrington residence, while the exterior shots of the apartment were shot in a neighborhood in central Waterbury. The Waterbury residence remained until 2018, when it was razed to make way for a parking lot.

The establishing scene featuring Sandra and Jeff driving toward the camp was shot in New Preston, while the central Packanack Lodge setting was filmed at a private children's camp on North Spectacle Pond near Kent. The cast and crew stayed on location at the camp, living on the premises in cabins, which executive producer Frank Mancuso Jr. described as "barracks"-like. Some lakeside sequences were shot on Lake Waramaug. The roadhouse tavern visited by some of the characters was the old Lake Waramaug Casino in New Preston, which was destroyed in a fire in 1982.

The use of the burlap sack hood worn by Jason (Steve Daskewisz) bears similarity to that used by the villain in the 1976 film The Town That Dreaded Sundown.

Several of the film's actors suffered injuries during filming: Daskewisz was rushed to the emergency room during filming after Amy Steel accidentally cut his hand with a machete. Steel explained, "The timing was wrong, and he didn't turn his pickaxe properly, and the machete hit his finger." Daskewisz received thirteen stitches on his middle finger. Daskiewisz suffered another injury on set after falling onto the pickaxe he was using, breaking several ribs. During one take of Alice being killed by Jason, the ice pick prop failed to properly retract, injuring King.

The scene where Steel's character Ginny gets grabbed from behind by an unmasked Jason in the climax took three takes to shoot it right. Steel was tense and frightened during filming of the scene.

Rumors sparked that John Furey left before the film wrapped, as his character Paul does not appear in the final scene. In truth, his character was not intended to have appeared. Furey stated, "I was there for the whole production," which director Miner verified, commenting: "John was a total professional and he did everything that was asked of him. If the ending was vague, it was the film's fault, not his."

=== Special effects ===
Special effects artist Tom Savini was asked to work on the film but declined because he was already working on another project, Midnight (1982). In addition, he was not receptive to the concept of Jason as the killer in the film. Savini was then replaced by Stan Winston. Winston, however, had a scheduling conflict and had to drop out of the project.

The make-up effects were ultimately handled by Carl Fullerton. Fullerton designed the "look" for the adult Jason Voorhees and went with long red hair and a beard while following the facial deformities established in the original film in the make-up designed by Tom Savini for Jason as a child. Fullerton's look for the adult Jason was abandoned in the sequel, Friday the 13th Part III, despite the fact that the film took place the following day and was helmed by the same director, Steve Miner. Some fans have theorized that the sequence showing Jason with a beard and long hair reflects a "dream" rather than a reality because the following sequel picks up with the events showing his face having not happened, and therefore what was represented was Ginny's guess at what he looked like under the burlap sack rather than what he actually looked like, which would excuse the break in continuity.

=== Post-production ===
Despite Cunningham's lack of involvement, his wife, Susan, was hired to edit the film. Like its predecessor, Friday the 13th Part 2 had difficulty receiving an R rating from the Motion Picture Association of America (MPAA). Upon reviewing the film, the Classification and Rating Administration (CARA) warned Paul Hagger, an executive at Paramount, that the "accumulation of violence throughout the film" may still lead to an X rating even if substantial cuts were made.

A total of forty-eight seconds had to be cut from the film in order to avoid an X rating. This film received a deluxe DVD release in February 2009, but the edited footage was not included. Most noted by censors was the murder scene of Jeff Dunsberry (Bill Randolph) and Sandra Dier (Marta Kober), who are impaled by a spear while having sex in a bed (a scene many have compared to a scene in Mario Bava's A Bay of Blood), which the censors found particularly graphic. In September 2020, it was announced that the uncut footage had been located by Samuelson Studios and was included as an extra on the upcoming box set release from Scream Factory.

After Paramount discovered actress Marta Kober was only 16, a scene showing her with full frontal nudity was completely deleted. In September 2020, cult horror movie distributor Scream Factory announced in conjunction with Samuelson Studios that cut footage from the film, including Marta Kober's full frontal nude scene had been found on a VHS owned by FX artist Carl Fullerton, who had saved the footage for his own portfolio. Fullerton lent the VHS to Scream Factory, who included it on the Friday the 13th Blu-Ray Collection: Deluxe Edition, though it did not include Kober's underage nudity.

Originally, the film was supposed to end with Pamela Voorhees' head opening her eyes and smiling towards the camera. This scene was filmed using actress Connie Hogan performing in makeup as Pamela's stunt head. However, Miner removed the scene from the final cut after it was ultimately decided that it would make the film's conclusion too "unserious." Footage of this alternate ending remains unreleased.

== Music ==
Friday the 13th Part 2

Soundtrack album by Harry Manfredini
- Released: January 13, 2012 (La-La Land); June 2015 (Waxwork)
- Recorded: 1981
- Genre: Film score
- Length: 42:57
- Labels: Gramavision; La-La Land; Waxwork
- Producers: Harry Manfredini; Jay Yuenger; Neil S. Bulk

In 1982, Gramavision Records released an LP album of selected pieces of Harry Manfredini's scores from the first three Friday the 13th films. On January 13, 2012, La-La Land Records released a limited edition 6-CD boxset containing Manfredini's scores from the first six films. It sold out in less than 24 hours. Waxwork Records released the score, composed by Harry Manfredini, on vinyl in summer 2015. The score would be reissued on CD on October 10, 2017, alongside Part 3 as a two-disc set, using the same 2012 master.

On January 13, 2023, La-La Land Records released an expanded "Ultimate Cut" edition of the score, featuring a new remaster sourced from the original master tapes, which were considered lost at the time of the 2012 box set’s creation, as well as music cues not used or heard in the final film.

== Release ==
Friday the 13th Part II was released theatrically in North America on May 1, 1981, playing on 1,350 screens. The film was released internationally in Argentina on October 29, 1981, and in Sweden on November 2, 1981. In France, the film was released on January 13, 1982.

=== Marketing ===
Spiros Angelikas was commissioned to design the film's official one-sheet poster. Angelikas' original design was modeled after the one-sheet for the first film, featuring a silhouette of a figure holding an axe, with an image of Jason attacking a woman in a boat on Crystal Lake. Though Paramount was pleased with the design, they opted not to use it as they felt it spoiled the reveal of Jason Voorhees as the film's villain.

An advanced teaser poster solely featuring the film's title against a black background was instead distributed to theaters, followed by a revised final version of Angelikas' original design, which eliminated the image of Jason attacking the woman on the lake.

=== Home media ===
Friday the 13th Part 2 was released on VHS and Betamax by Paramount Home Video in 1981. Paramount reissued the VHS again in 1994. The film was first released on DVD by Paramount on October 19, 1999, in a standard widescreen release featuring the theatrical trailer as the sole bonus feature.

In 2009, Paramount issued a "deluxe edition" of the film on both DVD and Blu-ray, which included several documentary featurettes along with the theatrical trailer. In 2011, it was released in a four-disc DVD collection along with the first, third, and fourth films in the series. It was again included in two Blu-ray sets: Friday the 13th: The Complete Collection, released in 2013, and Friday the 13th: The Ultimate Collection, in 2011 with a roughly 3/4 size replica of Jason's mask and glossy cardstock booklet (this collection was re-released in 2018 in a plastic multi-disc case). In October 2020, Shout! Factory released a 40th Anniversary box set on Blu-ray, which includes a 4K scan of Part 2 from its original camera negative and also includes the long lost uncut footage.

In 2024, the film was released on Blu-ray in 4K UHD in the United States on October 1 as part of Paramount Scares: Volume 2 collection, while a single edition was released in the United Kingdom on October 7. Paramount Home Entertainment issued a standalone 4K UHD edition on February 3, 2026 in celebration of the film's 45th anniversary.

== Reception ==
=== Box office ===
Friday the 13th Part 2 earned $6,429,784 during its opening weekend in North America, out-grossing the first film's weekend box office total. It would ultimately gross $21.7 million on a budget of $1.25 million. Though a financial success, the sequel's 7,813,948 admissions only accounted for 53% of the original film's 14,778,662 tickets sold. It was the 35th highest-grossing film of 1981, facing strong competition from such high-profile horror releases as Omen III: The Final Conflict, The Evil Dead, The Howling, My Bloody Valentine, Happy Birthday to Me, Graduation Day, Halloween II, and The Burning.

=== Critical response ===
==== Contemporary ====
Roger Ebert of the Chicago Sun-Times wrote that Friday the 13th Part 2 is "a cross between the Mad Slasher and Dead teenager genres; about two dozen movies a year feature a mad killer going berserk, and they're all about as bad as this one. Some have a little more plot, some have a little less. It doesn't matter." He finished his 1/2-star review of Part 2 by writing "this review will suffice for the Friday the 13th film of your choice." The New York Times's John Corry was also unimpressed by the film, noting: "Friday the 13th Part II will frighten you, at least for moments, although it will be a close-run thing whether it will be fright, nausea or simple distaste that gets to you first," adding that it "exists for no other purpose than to shock." Helen Verongos of The Clarion-Ledger similarly wrote: "Friday the 13th Part 2 obviously does not pretend to be any more than it is, a cheap—dimestore cheap—thriller aimed at the adolescent market... It is designed to be predictable enough to make the average fourth-grader feel sharp-witted."

The Dayton Journal Herald's Terry Lawson deemed the film a "special effects freak show for an audience immune to violence," and "exploitative and gratuitous." Jacqi Tully of the Arizona Daily Star praised the film's special effects, noting Jason as "effectively disgusting sight," and ultimately summarizing: "Gross is a pretty good way to describe it. Scary, bloody and violent come to mind, too. Also very effective." Howard Pousner of The Atlanta Constitution was less laudatory, deeming the return of the Jason Voorhees character as a "ludicrous arrangement... before you know it, eight more people have been murdered in virtually every manner: a neck sliced by barbed wire, a skull smashed, a jugular macheteed sic, a heart speared, et al."

==== Retrospective ====
On the review aggregator website Rotten Tomatoes, 28% of 106 critics' reviews are positive, with an average rating of 4.6/10. The website's consensus reads: "Mistaking an escalating body count for effective horror, Friday the 13th Part 2 recycles the original's lack of suspense and overkill of gory effects to diminished results." Metacritic, which uses a weighted average, assigned the film a score of 26 out of 100, based on 100 critics, indicating "generally unfavorable" reviews.

When reviewing the film's Blu-ray release, David Harley of Bloody Disgusting said, "It doesn't exactly stray far from the formula of the original film — neither do most of the other sequels — but Friday The 13th Part II still stands as an iconic and important entry in the series due to the introduction of Jason as the antagonist of the series and the usage of Italian horror films as an inspiration for its death scenes — most notably, the spear copulation death from Mario Bava's A Bay of Blood." Scott Meslow of The Week described it as a transitional film that blended elements of the original film and those to come later in the series.

Jeremiah Kipp, reviewing the film for Slant Magazine in 2009, commented on the film's visual elements favorably, writing: "The gore set pieces are handled in workmanlike fashion, with POV shots and heavy breathing slowly building up to a false scare (with a cat or best friend jumping out), followed by a mortifying glimpse of sadistic killing. By now, everyone knows what to expect from this kind of movie, but what’s surprising is how the low-budget rawness, cheap film stock bubbling over with grain, and washed-out lighting schemes give the film a kind of base in reality."

Time Out gave a mixed assessment in a 2012 review, noting: "This first sequel to Friday the 13th opens with mild panache when a summary recapitulation of the story so far ends with the sole survivor of the previous massacre being unexpectedly despatched by a new killer (the grief-crazed woman's supposedly dead son). The script then jumps five years, assembles a new set of victims at the summer camp, and repeats the gory carnage as before."

== Related works ==
=== Sequel ===
The character of Ginny was originally intended to return for Friday the 13th Part III (1982), with a preliminary screenplay featuring the character returning to college after surviving Jason's killing spree. After finding Paul's corpse inside her dormitory, she and Ted Bowen (Stu Charno, reprising his role) prepared to track down Voorhees. At the time, Steel turned down the role due to her involvement in other projects, resulting in significant script changes. Steel recalled: "They really wanted me for Part III. They didn't have a script, but they were just going to show me some sort of outline. Then my agents got involved, and I don't know if it was a money issue or a script issue, but I didn't do it."

After these concepts were scrapped, a new screenplay was written by Martin Kitrosser and Carol Watson, featuring a new cast of characters and an entirely different plot.

=== Novelization ===
A novelization based on the screenplay of Ron Kurz was published in 1988: Hawke, Simon, Friday the 13th Part II: A Novel, New American Library, New York, 1988, ISBN 0-451-15337-5

== Sources ==
- Albright, Brian (2012). Regional Horror Films, 1958-1990. Jefferson, North Carolina: McFarland & Company. ISBN 978-0-786-47227-7.
- Bracke, Peter (2006). Crystal Lake Memories. London, England: Titan Books. ISBN 978-1-845-76343-5.
- Grove, David (2005). Making Friday the 13th: The Legend of Camp Blood. Godalming, England: FAB Press. ISBN 978-1-903-25431-8.
- Farrands, Daniel (2013). Crystal Lake Memories: The Complete History of Friday the 13th (Documentary). Image Entertainment.
- Kendrick, James (2009). Hollywood Bloodshed: Violence in 1980s American Cinema. Carbondale, Illinois: Southern Illinois University Press. ISBN 978-0-809-32888-8.
