= Donald Symington =

American actor (1925-2013)

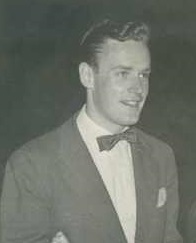
- Symington in 1950
- Born: Donald Leith Symington; August 30, 1925; Baltimore, Maryland, U.S.
- Died: July 24, 2013 (aged 87); Towson, Maryland, U.S.
- Occupation: Actor
- Spouse(s): Leslie Paul; 3 children
- Relatives: J. Fife Symington Jr. (brother)

Donald Leith Symington (August 30, 1925 – July 24, 2013) was an American stage, film and television actor. He appeared in such movies and television shows as Annie Hall (as the title character's father), Spring Break, and Fantasy Island.

== Partial filmography ==
Year	Title	Role	Notes
1970	Diary of a Mad Housewife	Pediatrician	
1972	Trick Baby	Morrison	
1973	From the Mixed-Up Files of Mrs. Basil E. Frankweiler	Museum Director	
1976	The Front	Congressman	
1977	Annie Hall	Dad Hall	
1979	Bloodline	Henley	
1981	Wolfen	Lawyer	
1982	Hanky Panky	Manager in Club	
1983	Spring Break	Ernest Dalby	
1992	Swans Crossing	Ralph	
1995	Mighty Aphrodite	Amanda's Father	
1999	Man of the Century	Reverend Sheehan	
