= Walt Gorney =

American actor

- Born: Walter J. Gorney; April 12, 1912; Vienna, Austria-Hungary (Now Austria)
- Died: March 5, 2004 (aged 91); New York City, U.S.
- Occupation: Actor

Walter J. Gorney (April 12, 1912 – March 5, 2004) was an Austrian-American actor. He was best known for his role as "Crazy" Ralph in the 1980s slasher films Friday the 13th (1980) and Friday the 13th Part 2 (1981). He returned to the series in Friday the 13th Part VII: The New Blood (1988) as the narrator.

His other film credits include Heavy Traffic (1973), King Kong (1976), and Day of the Animals (1977).

Walter's character Ralph was parodied by Robert Donner in the 1983 film Hysterical.

Gorney died in New York City on March 5, 2004, aged 91.

== Filmography ==
Year	Title	Role	Notes
1973	Heavy Traffic	Bum	Uncredited
1973	Cops and Robbers	Wino	
1976	King Kong	Subway Driver	Uncredited
1977	Day of the Animals	Sam	Uncredited
1978	Nunzio		
1980	Friday the 13th	Crazy Ralph	
1981	Friday the 13th Part 2	Crazy Ralph	
1981	Endless Love	Passerby	
1983	Trading Places	Duke Domestic	
1983	Easy Money	Monahan's Security Guard	
1984	Nothing Lasts Forever	Stage Manager	
1986	Seize the Day	Panhandler	
1988	Friday the 13th Part VII: The New Blood	Narrator	Voice role; uncredited
