= James Stacy =

American actor (1936–2016)

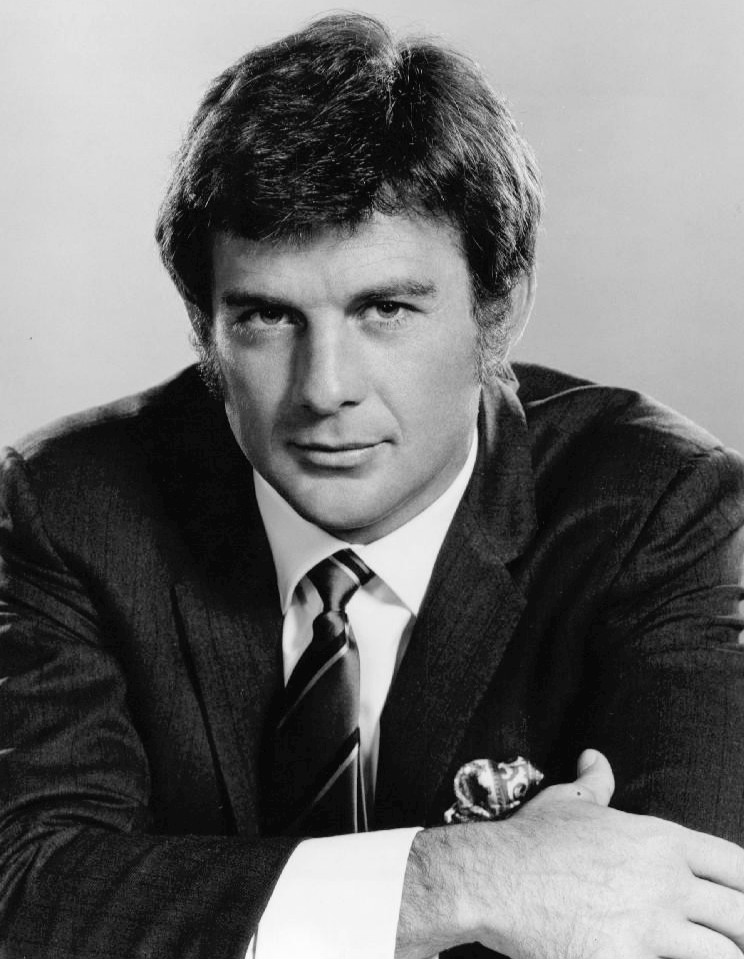
- Stacy in 1968
- Born: Maurice William Elias; December 23, 1936; Los Angeles, California, U.S.
- Died: September 9, 2016 (aged 79); Ventura, California, U.S.
- Other names: Jim Stacey; Jim Stacy
- Occupation: Actor
- Years active: 1956–1992
- Spouses: Connie Stevens (m. 1963; div. 1966); Kim Darby (m. 1968; div. 1969)
- Partner: Antigoni Tsamparlis (2000–2016; his death)
- Children: 1

Maurice William Elias (December 23, 1936 – September 9, 2016), known professionally as James Stacy, was an American film and television actor who starred in the late 1960s TV western Lancer.

In 1973, Stacy was hit by a drunk driver while riding his motorcycle, resulting in his left leg being severed. His left arm, nearly severed in the accident, was later amputated in the hospital. His girlfriend died in the crash. He returned to acting in 1975 before retiring in 1992. He largely disappeared from the public eye after being convicted of child molestation in 1995.

== Early life ==
Stacy was born Maurice William Elias on December 23, 1936, in Los Angeles to an Scotch-Irish American waitress and a Lebanese American bookmaker.

== Career ==
Stacy made his film debut in the romantic drama Sayonara in 1957, and his television debut in Highway Patrol. He had a recurring role as "Fred" in The Adventures of Ozzie and Harriet from 1958 to 1963. During the 1960s he made guest appearances in television shows, including 5 episodes of Gunsmoke, Hazel, The Donna Reed Show, Have Gun - Will Travel, Combat!, and Perry Mason in the 1964 episode "The Case of the Simple Simon" and the series finale "The Case of the Final Fade-out" in 1966.

Stacy is perhaps best remembered as a star of the western series Lancer, along with Andrew Duggan, Wayne Maunder, and Paul Brinegar. Lancer aired on CBS from 1968 to 1970. Stacy played the character "Johnny Madrid Lancer", a former gunslinger, the son of Duggan's character, Murdoch Lancer. Stacy also acted in several motion pictures from the 1950s through the 1970s, including a minor part in the musical South Pacific.

=== Motorcycle accident ===
On September 27, 1973, Stacy was taking his girlfriend, Clara Ann "Paeai-Pai" Cox, for a ride on his motorcycle in the Hollywood Hills when a drunk driver struck them. Cox was killed and Stacy lost his left arm and leg. Stacy's ex-wife, actress and singer Connie Stevens, organized a 1974 celebrity gala to raise money for his expenses. The gala, whose attendees included Frank Sinatra and Barbra Streisand, raised $118,000 ($770,000 today). In 1976, Stacy won a $1.9 million lawsuit ($10.8 million today) against the bar that had served the drunk driver.

=== Comeback ===
After his recovery, Stacy appeared in roles created to accommodate his disability. His comeback film was the 1975 Kirk Douglas Western Posse, where he played newspaper editor Harold Hellman, a part Douglas had written for him. In 1977, Stacy starred in the TV movie Just a Little Inconvenience as a double-amputee Vietnam veteran. It earned him his first Primetime Emmy Award nomination for Outstanding Lead Actor in a Drama or Comedy Special. In 1980, he starred in and produced the TV movie My Kidnapper, My Love. His brother, Louie Elias, a character actor and stuntman, wrote the screenplay, based on the novel by Oscar Saul, to accommodate Stacy's disability. Elias was also the associate producer. Stacy also played Ed, the Bartender in the Disney film Something Wicked This Way Comes.

Stacy's other TV appearances included Hotel, Cagney & Lacey (for which he was nominated for a second Primetime Emmy for Outstanding Guest Performer in a Drama Series) and Highway to Heaven. His last TV role was in five 1990 episodes of the cop series Wiseguy, as Ed Rogosheske. He made his final appearance as a guest star on the sitcom series Roseanne in 1991, in the episode "Communicable Theater".

== Personal life ==
=== Marriages ===
Stacy was married twice. He married actress and singer Connie Stevens on October 12, 1963, in Hollywood. They were divorced in November 1966. His second marriage was to actress Kim Darby in 1968. They had a daughter, Heather, and divorced in 1969.

=== Arrest and conviction ===
In November 1995, Stacy pleaded no contest to a charge of molesting an 11-year-old girl. On December 7, 1995, he failed to appear for sentencing in Ventura County Superior Court and was arrested the next day in a Honolulu, Hawaii hospital after he fled California. He attempted suicide by jumping off a cliff. After recovering, he waived extradition and returned to California. On March 5, 1996, he received a six-year prison sentence. The prosecutor said she believed Stacy might have been eligible for probation for the molestation, but his post-arrest behavior, coupled with two arrests in June 1995 for prowling at the homes of other girls, led her to seek a prison sentence. He served his sentence at the California Institution for Men in Chino, California.

== Death ==
On September 9, 2016, Stacy died of anaphylactic shock in Ventura, California after being administered an antibiotic injection at the office of Dr. Cedric Emery. He was 79.

== Portrayal ==
Stacy is portrayed by Timothy Olyphant in the 2019 Quentin Tarantino film Once Upon a Time in Hollywood starring Leonardo DiCaprio and Brad Pitt. Olyphant is set to reprise his role in the sequel The Further Mis-Adventures of Cliff Booth.

== Filmography ==
Year	Title	Role	Notes
1957	Sayonara	Reporter	Uncredited
1958	Lafayette Escadrille	Alan Nichols	Uncredited
1958	South Pacific	Sailor / Seabee	Credited as Jim Stacey, Uncredited
1961	Like Father, Like Son	Art	Credited as Jim Stacey
1963	Summer Magic	Charles Bryant	
1965	Winter A-Go-Go	Danny Frazer	
1965	A Swingin' Summer	Mickey	
1969	Flareup	Joe Brodnek	
1975	Posse	Harold Hellman	
1982	Double Exposure	B.J. Wilde	Alternative title: Model Killer
1983	Something Wicked This Way Comes	Ed, the Bartender	
1991	F/X2	Cyborg	Alternative title: F/X 2: The Deadly Art of Illusion

Television
Year	Title	Role	Notes
1956–1963	The Adventures of Ozzie and Harriet	Fred	19 episodes
1957	Highway Patrol	Young Man in Car	Episode: "Female Hitchhiker"
1962	Shannon	Cracker Coe	Episode: "The Jungle Kid"
1962	Have Gun – Will Travel	Johnny Tully	Episode: "Man in an Hourglass"
1962	The Donna Reed Show	Danny; Sandy; Steve Calahan	3 episodes
1962	Cheyenne	Luther James	Episode: "Showdown at Oxbend"
1963	Hazel		Episode: "The Baby Came C.O.D."
1964–1966	Perry Mason	Scott Everett; Barry Conrad	2 episodes
1964–1973	Gunsmoke	Various roles	5 episodes
1965	Mister Roberts		Episode: "Just Getting There Is Half the Fun"
1966	And Baby Makes Three	Dr. Peter Cooper	unsold TV pilot
1966	The Monroes	Perry Hutchins	Episode: "Ride with Terror"
1966	Combat!	Farley	Episode: "The Bankroll"
1968	Premiere	Andrew Bass	Episode: "The Freebooters" (unsold pilot)
1968	Cimarron Strip	Joe Bravo	Episode: "The Judgment"
1968–1970	Lancer	Johnny Madrid Lancer	51 episodes
1971	Paper Man	Jerry	TV movie
1972	Love, American Style		Segment: "Love and the Alibi"
1972	Heat of Anger	Gus Pride	TV movie
1972	Medical Center	Neil	Episode: "Cycle of Peril"
1972	The Streets of San Francisco	Peter Forrest	Episode: "Whose Little Boy Are You?"
1972	Marcus Welby, M.D.	Phil Darrow	Episode: "Jason Be Nimble, Jason Be Quick"
1972	Owen Marshall: Counselor at Law		Episode: "Starting Over Again"
1973	Ordeal	Andy Folsom	TV movie
1977	Just a Little Inconvenience	Kenny Briggs	TV movie
1980	My Kidnapper, My Love	Denny	TV movie
1981	An Ozzie and Harriet Christmas	Self	TV special on KTLA in Los Angeles
1985	Hotel	Jeremy Hale	Episode: "Saving Grace"
1986	Cagney & Lacey	Ted Peters	Episode: "The Gimp"
1987	Highway to Heaven	Joe Mason	Episode: "The Hero"
1990	Wiseguy	Ed Rogosheske	5 episodes
1990	Matters of the Heart	Glen Harper	TV movie
1991		Himself	Episode: "Communicable Theater"
