= The Idolmaker =

1980 musical film directed by Taylor Hackford

- Theatrical release poster
- Directed by: Taylor Hackford
- Written by: Edward di Lorenzo
- Produced by: Gene Kirkwood; Howard W. Koch Jr.
- Starring: Ray Sharkey; Peter Gallagher; Paul Land; Joe Pantoliano; Tovah Feldshuh
- Cinematography: Adam Holender
- Edited by: Neil Travis
- Music by: Jeff Barry
- Production company: Koch-Kirkwood Productions
- Distributed by: United Artists
- Release date: November 14, 1980
- Running time: 117 minutes
- Country: United States
- Language: English
- Box office: $2.6 million

The Idolmaker is a 1980 American musical drama directed by Taylor Hackford in his feature directorial debut, written by Edward di Lorenzo, and starring Ray Sharkey, Peter Gallagher, Paul Land, Tovah Feldshuh and Joe Pantoliano. Loosely based on the life of rock promoter/producer Bob Marcucci, whose discoveries included Frankie Avalon and Fabian and who served as a technical advisor for the production, the film marked the screen debuts of both Gallagher and Land.

The film was released on November 14, 1980 to generally positive reviews and grossed over $2.6 million at the box office. Sharkey would win a Golden Globe for his performance in this film.

== Plot ==
In the Bronx in 1959, waiter and aspiring singer-songwriter Vincent "Vinnie" Vacarri is informed by his best friend and piano accompanist, Gino "G.G." Pilato, of their upcoming time slot at a recording studio, while working at his family's restaurant. After fighting with the mobster who owns the studio, he later tells his mother he lacks the necessary looks and charisma to be a singer. Inspired by observing his friend Tomaso DeLorusso charismatically playing saxophone at a New Jersey nightclub, Vinnie convinces him that he is destined to be a headline act. Over the next few months, he molds him into a singer under the name "Tommy Dee" and produces a record with him. In order to promote Tommy by starting a record company, he reluctantly asks his father Frank for a $10,000 loan, criticizing him for selfishly abandoning his family for money and women.

Vinnie presses Tommy's records, and eventually Tommy successfully performs his debut single "Here Is My Love" on disc jockey Walt Bennett's show. Afterward, Walt pretends Tommy's song is mediocre until Vinnie bribes him into putting Tommy’s record in rotation. Later, Vinnie convinces Teen Scene magazine editor Brenda Roberts to feature Tommy on the magazine's upcoming cover. Sometime later, Tommy performs his follow-up single "Sweet Little Lover" on the television show National Bandstand, ignoring the rehearsed choreography and spontaneously interacting with the female audience. While celebrating his new success at the family restaurant, Vinnie becomes intoxicated, berates a clumsy waiter, and complains that Tommy will not follow his advice to study acting, frightening an overly concerned Brenda.

Sometime later, Vinnie gives his father a check to repay part of the loan, who warns him to remain humble and protect his investment while simultaneously advising him to draw up a contract with Tommy and recruit more clients. Later, Vinnie meets with Phil Delano, an agent from I.A.A., a large talent agency, and agrees to find Tommy a movie role. Meanwhile, following his father's advice, he transforms busboy Guido Bevaloqua into a singer named "Caesare" and assuages a jealous Tommy when he sees Vinnie grooming Caesare instead of joining him on tour. Later, Vinnie arranges a tryout for Caesare at a small club. In the dressing room, Tommy's advice to Caesare to smoke to calm his nerves sickens Caesare. On stage, he nervously runs off before finishing the first song. As Caesare vomits in the alley, Vinnie reassures him that he will not let him down. Afterwards, Vinnie creatively markets Caesare by splashing his photograph across town. As both continue rehearsals, an abandoned Tommy expresses a desire to obtain the part in a television series that Vinnie denied him and threatens to fire him. At Caesare's next concert, girls attack him on stage while he is performing his debut single "Baby", ripping his clothing, but once more security is added, he successfully finishes his performance.

Instead of allowing Caesare to tour, Vinnie places him in seclusion to increase his mystique. After five months, a restless Caesare borrows Gino's car to spend a romantic evening with Teen Scene reporter Ellen Fields. While he is returning, a cop gives him a ticket for driving while intoxicated and running a red light. To prevent the misdemeanor from being publicized, Vinnie gives the officer concert tickets and threatens to drop Caesare as an act. When Vinnie hands Brenda a report, revealing that Ellen, her best reporter, has had similar relationships prior to her fling with Caesare, Brenda warns that Ellen's dismissal will upset Caesare. However, Vinnie claims that because he will be on tour, Teen Scene can cover the story exclusively. The tour begins in Memphis, Tennessee, but in the theater, Brenda criticizes Vinnie for being manipulative and reminds him she will cover his acts without special favors. After winning over the Memphis audience with his Elvis-inspired song "However Dark the Night", Caesare opts to switch management and signs with Phil Delano, with Gino following him.

Returning to his old neighborhood, Vinnie is unmotivated until his mother finally inspires him to return to the restaurant. Months later, he invites Brenda to witness him perform, but she declines. One night, Brenda encounters him on stage performing his own self-written composition "I Believe It Can Be Done", approvingly nodding at him.

== Cast ==
- Ray Sharkey as Vincent "Vinnie" Vacarri
- Peter Gallagher as Guido Bevaloqua/Caesare
- Tovah Feldshuh as Brenda Roberts
- Joe Pantoliano as Gino "G.G." Pilato
- Paul Land as Tomaso "Tommy Dee" DeLorusso
- Maureen McCormick as Ellen Fields
- John Aprea as Mario Vacarri

== Production ==
Marcucci approached producer Gene Kirkwood with the idea for the film. In the original script, the singers were more sympathetic and the producer less so. Production began in March 1980 in Los Angeles.

== Reception ==
=== Critical response ===
The movie was released into theaters on November 14, 1980. Critical reception was generally positive. The New York Times' Janet Maslin wrote that the movie was a "modest, interesting, well-acted movie, more lively than it is exciting," praising the acting while criticizing the soundtrack. The Chicago Sun Times' Roger Ebert praised the film's acting, singling out Sharkey's performance saying the film was "a well-crafted movie that works, that entertains, and that pulls us through its pretty standard material with the magnetism of the Ray Sharkey performance." Additionally, on the TV show Sneak Previews, Ebert gave the film a thumbs up, while his co-host Gene Siskel gave it a thumbs down, criticizing Sharkey's performance as overacting. The Los Angeles Times' Kevin Thomas wrote the film was "some gritty, satirical commentary on the pop music scene of decades past but is hampered by an ending that seems self-dramatizing fantasy made real. Ray Sharkey, however, is impressive in the title role."

The movie earned $318,403 on opening weekend, and grossed a domestic total of $2,625,716, appearing in 171 theaters. Sharkey blamed the low earnings on poor marketing on the part of United Artists, saying he thought the film suffered due to "bad marketing, very poor marketing. It's not about idols - it's about an idolmaker. But you open up the paper and see an idol, which doesn't appeal to the people who really think about what movies they're going to see." Sharkey would win the Golden Globe for Best Actor in a Musical/Comedy for his performance.

The film was a favorite of the singer Prince, and served as an inspiration for him to create other bands separate from himself under a pseudonym, such as The Time and Vanity 6.

== Soundtrack ==
The film features an original music score by Jeff Barry and choreography by Deney Terrio.

Track listing for the soundtrack

1. "Here Is My Love" (Jesse Frederick)
2. "Ooo-Wee Baby" (Darlene Love)
3. "Come and Get It" (Nino Tempo)
4. "Sweet Little Lover" (Jesse Frederick)
5. "I Can't Tell" (Colleen Fitzpatrick)
6. "However Dark the Night" (Peter Gallagher)
7. "Baby" (Peter Gallagher)
8. "I Know Where You're Going" (Nino Tempo)
9. "A Boy and a Girl" (The Sweet Inspirations and The London Fog)
10. "I Believe It Can Be Done" (Ray Sharkey)
11. "I Believe It Can Be Done" (Instrumental) (Nino Tempo)

=== Charts ===
Chart (1981)	Peak position
Australia (Kent Music Report)	37

== Home media ==
On August 27, 2013, Shout! Factory released The Idolmaker on Blu-ray.

== Lawsuit ==
Fabian Forte, a teen idol of the late 1950s and early 1960s, thought the film to be defamatory. The filmmakers claimed that the film was not a true story, and pointed to a disclaimer in the film explaining this. Forte filed a $64 million lawsuit against the film, alleging defamation and invasion of privacy, pointing to scenes from the film that mirrored his life. Having served as the inspiration for the character of Guido/Caesare, Forte claimed the film made him look like "a totally manufactured singer, a mere pretty face without any singing ability or acting talent." Bob Marcucci argued that the film wasn't based on Forte's life, but the fact that the film's main character Vincent Vaccari was based on Marcucci's own life complicated this argument. The case was settled out of court, requiring Forte, his wife, and family to receive apologies in The Hollywood Reporter and Variety, and Marcucci's 7.5% ownership of the film passed to Forte.

== Potential remakes ==
In 2014, Variety reported that a remake of the film was in the works, with Craig Brewer to direct, and Justin Timberlake to produce (along with the two producers of the original film, Hawk Koch and Gene Kirkwood). The remake never materialized.

In March 2025, it was announced that Sam Wrench would be directing a forthcoming remake of the film.

== Awards and nominations ==
Golden Globes 1980, USA
Award	Person
Golden Globe for Best Actor in a Musical/Comedy	Ray Sharkey
Nominated:
Golden Globe for Best Motion Picture in a Musical/Comedy	Howard W. Koch Jr., Gene Kirkwood

Preceded by Peter Sellers	Golden Globes Best Actor in a Comedy/Musical; 1980	Succeeded by Dudley Moore
