= Just a Little Inconvenience =

- Genre: Drama
- Written by: Allan Balter; Theodore J. Flicker
- Directed by: Theodore J. Flicker
- Starring: Lee Majors; James Stacy; Barbara Hershey; Jim Davis
- Music by: Jimmie Haskell
- Country of origin: United States
- Original language: English

Production
- Executive producer: Lee Majors
- Producer: Allan Balter
- Production locations: Sunshine Village Ski Area, Banff National Park, Alberta, Canada
- Cinematography: Duke Callaghan
- Editor: Bernard J. Small
- Running time: 100 min.
- Production companies: Fawcett-Majors Productions; Universal Television

Original release
- Network: NBC
- Release: October 2, 1977

Just a Little Inconvenience is a 1977 American made-for-television post-war drama film written and directed by Theodore J. Flicker and starring Lee Majors, James Stacy and Barbara Hershey.

For his performance as a double-amputee Vietnam veteran, Stacy got a Primetime Emmy Award nomination for Outstanding Lead Actor in a Drama or Comedy Special. The film also earned a nomination for a Golden Globe for Best Motion Picture Made for TV.

== Plot ==
Frank Logan, a Vietnam War veteran, attempts to rehabilitate his friend, Kenny Briggs, who had lost an arm and a leg during the war. Logan teaches Briggs how to ski, and Briggs begins to see his double amputations as "just a little inconvenience."

== Cast ==
- Lee Majors as Frank Logan
- James Stacy as Kenny Briggs
- Barbara Hershey as Nikki Klausing
- Jim Davis as Dave Erickson
- Charles Cioffi as Maj. Bloom
- Lane Bradbury as B-Girl
- John Furey as Bartender
- Bob Hastings as Harry
- Frank Parker as Bill
