= Pia Grønning =

Danish actress (born 1949)

- Born: 2 November 1949 (age 76); Denmark
- Occupation: Actress
- Years active: 1970–

Pia Grønning (born 2 November 1949) is a Danish film actress who performed in Hollywood movies.

Grønning's first appearance in a Danish movie was Mariage collectif in 1970. She also appeared in The Twilight Zone episode, "Dead Woman's Shoes" as Susan Montgomery. She starred in Hosekraemmeren in 1970 in Denmark. She also appeared in Two Jakes in 1990 and in Wild Turkey in 2003, both Hollywood movies.

== Filmography ==
Year	Title	Role	Notes
1970	Tintomara	Tintomara	
1971	Collective Marriage	Maria	
1971	Hosekræmmeren	Cecil	
1974	19 Red Roses	Bitten Hjort	
1981	Model	Herself	Documentary
1990	The Two Jakes	Dr. Elsa Branchauer	
