= Backfield in Motion (film) =

American TV film

- Screenplay by: Gene O'Neill; Noreen Tobin; Janet Brownell
- Story by: Gene O'Neill; Noreen Tobin
- Directed by: Richard Michaels
- Starring: Roseanne Barr; Tom Arnold; Colleen Camp; Conchata Ferrell; Carolyn Mignini; Johnny Galecki
- Composer: Cliff Eidelman
- Country of origin: United States
- Original language: English

Production
- Producers: Bill Borden; Barry Rosenbush
- Cinematography: Mark Irwin
- Editor: Andrew Cohen
- Running time: 94 minutes
- Production companies: Think Entertainment; The Avnet/Kerner Company

Original release
- Network: ABC
- Release: November 13, 1991

Backfield in Motion is a 1991 American comedy film directed by Richard Michaels and written by Gene O'Neill, Noreen Tobin and Janet Brownell. The film stars Roseanne Barr, Tom Arnold, Colleen Camp, Conchata Ferrell, Carolyn Mignini and Johnny Galecki. The film premiered on ABC on November 13, 1991.

== Plot ==
Roseanne Barr plays a widowed mother/real estate agent who moves to an upstate California town so obsessed with football that she organizes a "mothers-versus-sons" football game.

== Cast ==
- Roseanne Barr as Nancy Seavers
- Tom Arnold as Howard Peterman
- Colleen Camp as Laurie
- Conchata Ferrell as Ann Bedowski
- Carolyn Mignini as Sheila
- Johnny Galecki as Tim Seavers
- Kevin Scannell as Joe Dooley Sr.
- Olivia Burnette as Betsy Dooley
- Mike Pniewski as Jimmy Cox
- Loyda Ramos as Sally
- Jayne Modean as Faith
- Brandon Crane as Andy
- Robert Noble as Harry
- Sean Murray as Joe Jr.
- Scott Ferguson as Boz
- Teresa Ganzel as Joanne
- Jessie Jones as Ms. Marsh
- Danny Gonzalez as Derek
- Patrick LaBrecque as Freddie
- Scott Wilkinson as Ray
- Alexander Folk as Mr. Brooks
