= Ara Gallant =

American photographer (1932–1990)

- Born: Ira Gallantz; 1932; The Bronx, New York, U.S.
- Died: 1990 (aged 58); Las Vegas, Nevada, U.S.
- Occupations: Hair stylist, photographer
- Years active: 1960s–1990

Ara Gallant (1932–1990) was an American hairstylist who was noted for perfecting the "flying hair" technique while working for Vogue in the 1960s. He later became a fashion photographer.

== Early life ==
Gallant was born Ira Gallantz in the Bronx, New York into a Russian Jewish family. He had a brother who was murdered in the 1980s. Gallant, who was openly gay, eventually began styling hair. He later admitted "I hated it [hair styling]. But I was good at it... I had always thought to be talented at something, you had to like it.”

Gallant began his career at Bergdorf Goodman as a hairstylist, and eventually became one of New York City's top colorists. He later changed his name to "Ara Gallant" because he felt it sounded "more exotic".

== Career ==
In the 1960s, Gallant started working for Vogue as a hairstylist. Gallant was the first hairstylist to be paid to solely style hair by a magazine. He worked with many notable photographers including Richard Avedon (with whom he frequently collaborated earning the pair the nickname "Aradon") and Irving Penn. He also worked with many supermodels of that era including Twiggy, Jean Shrimpton, Veruschka, Margaux Hemingway and Penelope Tree. One of his notable collaborations with Avedon is a 1968 portrait of Twiggy with "flying hair", a visual gimmick mastered by Gallant. Gallant's work was eventually featured on twenty-six covers of Vogue. Throughout his career, he worked with many celebrities including Elizabeth Taylor, Warren Beatty, Marisa Berenson, Iman, Mick Jagger, Cher, Sophia Loren, Anjelica Huston and Drew Barrymore. He also worked for many magazines including Vogue, Interview, Playboy and Rolling Stone.

In the 1970s, Gallant became a photographer. His main muse was the Dutch model, Apollonia van Ravenstein. In the late 1970s, Gallant succeeded Sari Marks as Staff Photographer for the fashion magazine Ambiance. He also worked with fashion designer Diane Von Furstenberg. During this period, Gallant became a fixture in the nightclub scene and frequented Studio 54. His personal style became as well known as his hair styling and photographic work. Gallant wore only black from head to toe, sported chiseled sideburns and frequently lined his eyes with kohl. He also wore high heeled cowboy boots and a Japanese schoolboys' hat which was covered with gold charms. Model Lauren Hutton later said of Gallant, "He was the first leather queen in New York City or any place in the world that I had ever seen and I had never seen anyone as unusual as him." Gallant regularly held dinner parties at his West End Avenue apartment attended by his celebrity friends including Anjelica Huston and Jack Nicholson. Gallant's apartment became well known for its unusual and modern decor; all the windows were shuttered, the walls of the living room were painted with black, glossy paint and the white linoleum were made to resemble a river of blood with splashes of red paint. Gallant's mirrored dining room with glass tables was featured in an issue of House & Garden.

By the early 1980s, drug use and personal issues had begun to take its toll on Gallant's life and career. He was deeply affected by the murder of his brother and encountered trouble with the IRS for failing to pay income tax. Gallant was forced to sell his West End Avenue apartment. He then decided to move to Los Angeles to pursue a career in screenwriting.

== Later years and death ==
After moving to Los Angeles, Gallant had trouble securing work in the film industry. He began abusing cocaine and eventually entered rehab. After completing rehab, Gallant relapsed and ran out of money.

While staying in a Las Vegas hotel in 1990, Gallant committed suicide.

== In popular culture ==
In 2010, Italian publisher Damiani Editore released Ara Gallant edited by David Wills, a photography book featuring photos showcasing Gallant's work as a hairstylist and portraits Gallant took when he worked as a photographer. Ara Gallant also features interviews with Gallant's friends and associates including Penelope Tree, Steven Meisel, Polly Mellen and Anjelica Huston (who also wrote the foreword).
