= Tintomara (film) =

1970 Swedish-Danish drama film by Hans Abramson

Tintomara is a 1970 Swedish-Danish drama film directed by Hans Abramson and starring Pia Grønning, Britt Ekland and Eva Dahlbeck. It is based on the novel Drottningens juvelsmycke by Jonas Love Almqvist. It features one of Swedish literature's most enduringly popular characters, the intersex Tintomara.

== Cast ==
- Eva Dahlbeck as Baroness
- Britt Ekland as Adolfine
- Monica Ekman as Amanda
- Pia Grønning as Tintomara
- Torben Hundal as Ankarström
- Jørgen Kiil as Uncle
- Bill Öhrström as Clas Henrik
- Hardy Rafn as Priest
- Bruno Wintzell as Ferdinand
