= Paul Land =

American actor (1956–2007)

Paul Callandrillo (January 31, 1956 – December 30, 2007), better known as Paul Land, was an American actor who was best known for his roles in the movies The Idolmaker and Spring Break. Land came from a large family (13 children total), and 1 of his brothers was former professional basketball player Dan Callandrillo.

Land was born in Hoboken, New Jersey. He served in the United States Army, became a roofer, and then a model after being discovered at a party, which led to a French TV commercial for Perrier. He appeared to have a bright future ahead of him with his acting career after The Idolmaker was released in 1980 - even appearing on American Bandstand, during which Dick Clark praised Land as "an amazing guy" and that "he pulled it off beautifully" regarding his role in the film as singer Tommy Dee (a character modeled after early rock n' roll singer Frankie Avalon). In the same appearance, Clark said Land was "Not only a talented guy, but you have that secret, magic ingredient that all of the star-makers look for."

While reviewing the film, Roger Ebert pointed out "Land does a good job of playing the movie's first rock singer, a spoiled, egotistical creation renamed 'Tommy Dee'" and The New York Times said "Paul Land makes a wonderfully sullen Tommy Dee and, like Peter Gallagher in Caesare's role, traces the evolution of his character's stardom in meticulous detail." In the movie, Land's character sings 2 songs, "Here Is My Love" and "Sweet Little Lover", but the actor himself did not sing the songs (they were sung by TV and film composer Jesse Frederick).

On July 7, 1981, Land married Michelle Dimitri (daughter of international fashion designer Piero Dimitri) at St. Patrick's Cathedral (Manhattan).

Despite the early praise (and additional roles in the movies Spring Break and Wild Orchid, the TV movie Private Sessions, and the TV show Riptide), by the early 1990s Land had left acting to start his own successful construction business in New Jersey under his real name, Paul Callandrillo. He died in North Bergen, New Jersey on December 30, 2007, at the age of 51 from cancer.

When Spring Break was issued on DVD in 2009, some of the actors recorded a commentary to go along with the film, which was dedicated to Land.

== Filmography ==
| Year | Title | Role | Notes |
|---|---|---|---|
| 1980 | The Idolmaker | Tommy Dee | |
| 1983 | Spring Break | Stu | |
| 1989 | Wild Orchid | Big Sailor | Final film role |
