= Russell Todd =

American actor (born 1958)

- Born: Russell Todd Goldberg; March 14, 1958 (age 68); Albany, New York, U.S.
- Occupation: Actor
- Years active: 1980–present

Russell Todd Goldberg (born March 14, 1958) is an American film and television actor.

== Early life and career ==
Todd graduated from Troy High School in 1976 and later attended Syracuse University where he studied filmmaking but dropped out in his junior year. After leaving college, Todd worked as a model for the Zoli Agency, where he appeared in Frederick Wiseman's 1981 documentary Model, before moving on to an acting career. He studied acting at the Neighborhood Playhouse.

His film and television acting career includes parts in the films Friday the 13th Part 2, Where the Boys Are '84, Chopping Mall, He Knows You're Alone and roles in television series including High Mountain Rangers Another World, The Bold and the Beautiful and The Young and the Restless.

He left acting in 1997 to run an agency for steadicam operators and "A" and "B" camera operators.

He reunited with various cast members from the Friday the 13th films to take part in the documentaries His Name Was Jason: 30 Years of Friday the 13th (2009) and Crystal Lake Memories: The Complete History of Friday the 13th (2013).

Todd returned to acting in 2025 with several film, TV, and podcast projects.

== Filmography ==
=== Film ===
Year	Title	Role	Notes	Refs.
1980	He Knows You're Alone	Boy in Car		
1981	Model	Himself	Documentary film	
1981	Friday the 13th Part 2	Scott		
1984	Where the Boys Are '84	Scott Nash		
1986	Chopping Mall	Rick Stanton	Alternate title: Killbots	
1990	Sweet Murder	Dell Davis		
1990	Face the Edge	Nick	Alternate title: One Last Run	
1990	Border Shootout	Clay Jordan	Alternate title: Law at Randado	
1996	Club V.R.	Tam	Direct-to-video film	
2004	Scottish Instinct	Russell Todd	Short film	
2013	Crystal Lake Memories: The Complete History of Friday the 13th	Himself	Documentary film	
TBA	Stiletto	The Mysterious Man		

=== Television ===
Year	Title	Role	Notes	Refs.
1985–86	Riptide	Tony Guirilini	Episodes: "Arrivederci, Baby", "The Pirate and the Princess"	
1986	Capitol	Jordy Clegg #2		
1986	Throb	James	Episode: "Wedding Bell Blue"	
1987	Jake and the Fatman	Sean Thompson	Episode: "Brother, Can You Spare a Dime?"	
1988	High Mountain Rangers	Jim "Flash" Cutler	Main cast; 12 episodes	
1989	Jesse Hawkes	Jim "Flash" Cutler	Episode: "Pilot"	
1990–93	Another World	Jamie Frame	Main cast; 24 episodes	
1993	The Young and the Restless	Brad Carlton	Replacement role; 10 episodes	
1995	The Bold and the Beautiful	Jerry Birn	Episode: "#1.2111"	
2009	His Name Was Jason: 30 Years of Friday the 13th	Himself	Documentary film	
