= Trauma Center (TV series) =

American medical drama television series

- Genre: Medical drama
- Starring: James Naughton; Lou Ferrigno; Dorian Harewood; Wendie Malick; Alfie Wise
- Composer: James Di Pasquale
- Country of origin: United States
- Original language: English
- No. of seasons: 1
- No. of episodes: 13 (3 unaired)

Production
- Running time: 60 minutes
- Production companies: Glen A. Larson Productions; Jeremac Productions; 20th Century Fox Television

Original release
- Network: ABC
- Release: September 22 – December 8, 1983

Trauma Center is an American medical drama that aired on ABC from September 22, 1983 to December 8, 1983.

In the run-up to the 1983–84 fall season, the series was promoted on-air and in the Fall Preview issue of TV Guide as Medstar, but was changed to Trauma Center prior to the first air-date.

== Premise ==
The series followed the staff at Medstar Trauma Center, a special unit of the fictional McKee Hospital in Los Angeles County who dealt with numerous life-threatening medical incidents in each episode. The show also focused on two ambulance paramedics who often had to undertake unusual or dangerous actions in order to rescue injured people before delivering them to the Trauma Center.

== Cast ==
- James Naughton as Dr. Michael 'Cutter' Royce
- Dorian Harewood as Dr. Nate 'Skate' Baylor
- Wendie Malick as Dr. Brigitte Blaine
- Bill Randolph as Dr. 'Beaver' Bouvier
- Eileen Heckart as Amy Decker, R.N.
- Arlen Dean Snyder as Dr. Charles Sternhouser
- Alfie Wise as paramedic Sidney 'Hatter' Pacelli
- Lou Ferrigno as paramedic John Six
- Jack Bannon as pilot Buck Williams
- Jayne Modean as Nurse Hooter

== US television ratings ==
Season	Episodes	Start date	End date	Nielsen rank	Nielsen rating	Tied with
1983–1984	10	September 22, 1983	December 8, 1983	80	11.8	N/A

== Episodes ==
No.	Title	Original release date
1	"Trauma Center"	September 22, 1983
2	"Notes About Courage"	September 29, 1983
This is a crossover begun in The Fall Guy. The episode is called "Trauma", which aired on September 28, 1983.
3	"No Easy Days"	October 6, 1983
4	"Breakthrough"	October 13, 1983
5	"No More Heroes"	October 20, 1983
6	"Turnaround"	October 27, 1983
7	"Trail's End"	November 10, 1983
8	"Shock Waves"	November 17, 1983
9	"Silent Sounds"	November 24, 1983
10	"Out of Control"	December 8, 1983
11	"Line of Fire"	N/A
12	"Win or Lose"	N/A
13	"Smash-Up"	N/A
