= Model (film) =

1981 documentary film by Frederick Wiseman

- Theatrical release poster with models Apollonia van Ravenstein, Sara Kapp, and Pat Cleveland posing in furs
- Directed by: Frederick Wiseman
- Produced by: Frederick Wiseman
- Cinematography: John Davey
- Edited by: Frederick Wiseman
- Distributed by: Zipporah Films
- Release date: September 16, 1981 (U.S.)
- Running time: 130 minutes
- Country: United States
- Language: English

Model (Note: The title references both the film's subject and Wiseman's template for filmmaking.) is a 1981 American documentary film directed by Frederick Wiseman. The film examines the modeling industry in New York City. It was Wiseman's ninth documentary for WNET, a New York PBS station.

The film follows the Zoli modeling agency, owned by Zoltan "Zoli" Rendessy. The film shows Zoli himself, his employees, models, clients, and photographers.

== Synopsis ==
Like all of Wiseman's films, Model has no narrator. The film opens with a cityscape of lower Manhattan, showing the World Trade Center. The film intercuts fashion sequences (runway shows, photo shoots, a pantyhose commercial), Manhattan street scenes (roller skaters, an ambulance, "pedestrians who often look livelier than the models"), and shots of mannequins in store windows.

The agency screens aspiring models and connects them with clients, in the process reducing them to labels and stereotypes, including the young executive, the all-American girl, the sophisticate, the streetsmart, and the Avon look. Zoli tells one female aspirant who is 5 ft 6.5 in (168.9 cm) tall that the height is "too short for what we do... It's a problem," but in the following scene, a woman only 0.75 in (1.9 cm) taller is told, "I think we have some possibilities here."

The film's longest sequence, running nearly 30 minutes, is the making of a television commercial for Evan-Picone pantyhose. The director instructs the male and female model to run into each other repeatedly. For the same commercial, model Apollonia van Ravenstein's leg is photographed over 79 takes to create a four-second "peacock effect." The film shows the completed 30-second commercial.

The film ends with an Oscar de la Renta runway show with twirling fashion models, followed by a closing shot of the Manhattan skyline at night.

== Cast ==
- Alva Chinn
- Pat Cleveland
- Pia Grønning
- Sara Kapp
- Apollonia van Ravenstein
- Zoltan "Zoli" Rendessy
- Russell Todd
- Andy Warhol
- Renauld White

== Production ==
The film was shot in 1979 and 1980 on black-and-white film. Wiseman selected the Zoli agency simply because "the idea of a model agency appealed to me ... and [Zoli] agreed."

Wiseman did not research the modeling industry before filming, and described the editing process as discovery: "It is all a surprise since I know very little about the subject before I begin shooting. The idea is that the film should at least in part show what I learned as a consequence of the shoot and the long period of editing."

== Release ==
The film was broadcast on PBS on September 16, 1981.

== Reception ==
The film shows modeling as "monotonous, lacking autonomy, and devoid of internal satisfaction", and as "a grind of rejections and retakes." Novelist William T. Vollmann had expected the film to be glamorous and was surprised by its monotony. The film examines how institutional routines become repetitive, drawing parallels to military operations.

Model reflects Wiseman's increasing political consciousness, contrasting the constructed imagery of advertising with the imperfections of the real world. Before filming the pantyhose commercial, the New York City streets are cleaned. Wiseman films another documentary crew shooting a shower interview with a male model, revealing that the model is wearing underwear. A street demonstration that appears to be a feminist protest is revealed to be the filming of a commercial. The Zoli agency serves as a lens into the broader workings of advertising, marketing, and retail.
