= Apollonia van Ravenstein =

Dutch model and actress (born 1954)

- Born: 12 August 1954 (age 72); Geldrop, Netherlands
- Occupations: Model; actress
- Years active: 1969–1990s
- Spouse: Edward van Zaane
- Relatives: Anna Cleveland (niece)

Apollonia van Ravenstein (born 12 August 1954) is a Dutch retired model and actress. She attained success in the 1970s as a fashion model and appeared on the cover of various Vogue magazines. As an actress, she had roles in the films Seraphita's Diary (1982), Nothing Lasts Forever (1984), and Flodder (1986), and appears prominently as herself in the documentary Model (1981). In the late 1990s, she began working as a hostess on luxury cruise ships of the Holland America Line.

== Early life ==
Apollonia van Ravenstein was born in Geldrop, Netherlands, on 12 August 1954. She began her career at the age of 15 posing for a pantyhose collection in her hometown. Her brother Theo encouraged her to pursue a modeling career and arranged an appointment with Corine Rottschäfer's modeling agency in Amsterdam.

== Career ==
=== Modeling ===
She became one of the most sought-after models of the 1970s, modeling for Halston and Diane von Fürstenberg. She appeared on multiple Vogue magazine covers, including British Vogue (15 October 1971, December 1971 and January 1972) and Vogue Italia (June 1972). In 1972, van Ravenstein signed an exclusive contract with American Vogue and she appeared on the cover of the 1 November 1972 issue. She appeared on the cover of Interview magazine's June 1973 issue.

She also had modeling contracts with photographers Norman Parkinson, Irving Penn, and Richard Avedon. Parkinson called her the "maddest, funniest, hardest-working model who ever earned a fortune." She was the muse of photographer Ara Gallant and they often partied together. She often modeled with Pat Cleveland, who married her brother Paul van Ravenstein in 1982.

She appeared in a pictorial for Playboy magazine in June 1978 and in the Sports Illustrated Swimsuit Issue in 1979. In 1982, van Ravenstein was photographed by pop artist Andy Warhol at the Factory.

=== Acting ===
In the 1980s, van Ravenstein had roles in the films Seraphita's Diary (1982), Nothing Lasts Forever (1984), and Flodder (1986). She also appeared in Anton Corbijn's 1986 music video "Golden Earrings Quiet Eyes."

=== Later career ===
After retiring from modeling and acting, she began working as a hostess for Holland America Line luxury cruise ships in the late 1990s. In 2026, van Ravenstein was photographed by Inez & Vinoodh for the April cover of Vogue Nederland.

== Personal life ==
She was a close friend of actress Anjelica Huston and they often modeled together in London and New York. She dated actor Jack Nicholson, who called her "Apples only," prior to his relationship with Huston. Nicholson and van Ravenstein had a one-night stand while he was dating Huston, which inspired Joni Mitchell's song "People's Parties" from the 1974 album Court and Spark. She also dated singer Mick Jagger who called her "Apples."

She is married to captain Edward van Zaane.
