= Steve Daskewisz =

American actor and stunt double

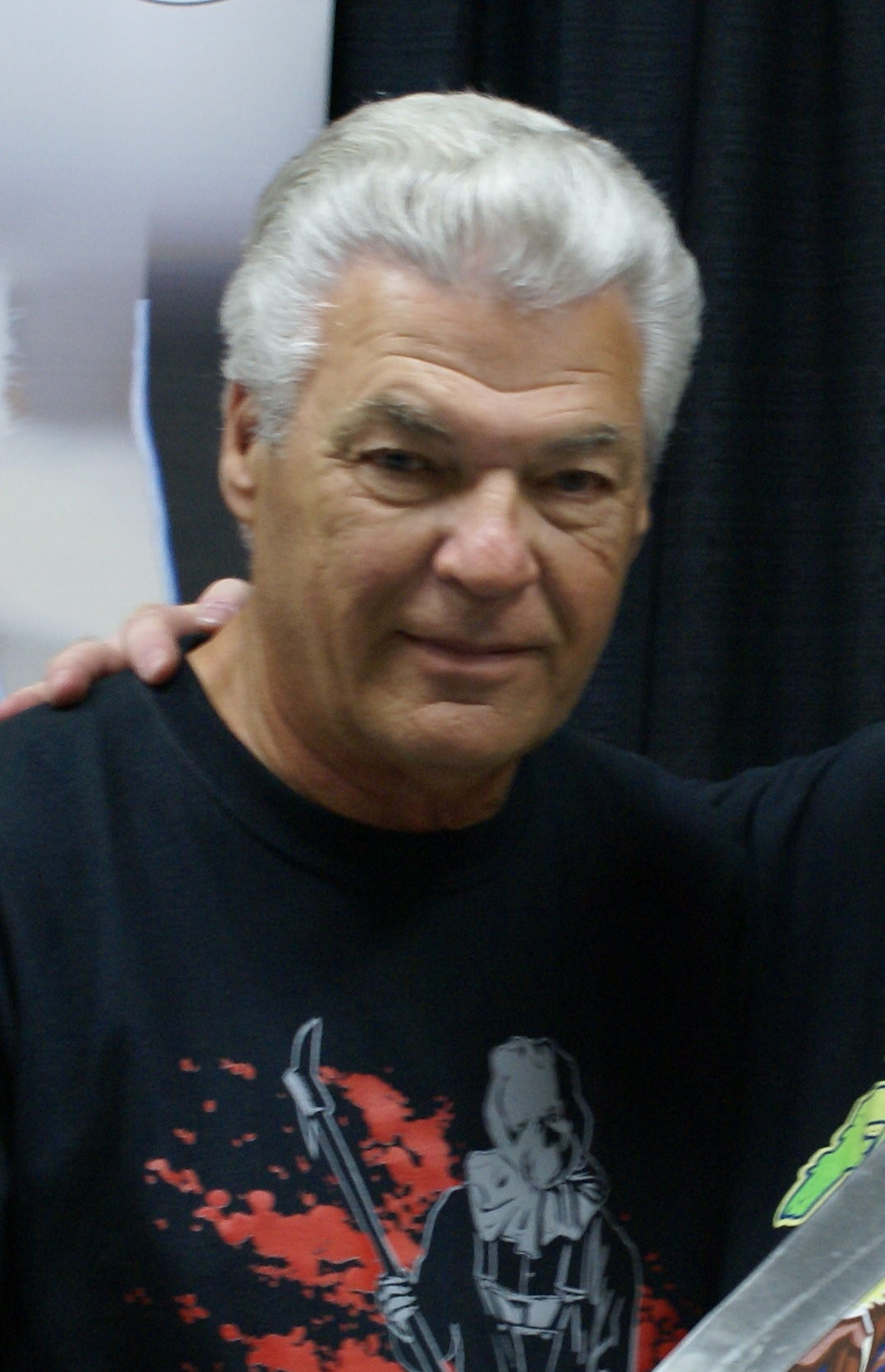
- Steve Dash at Full Moon Tattoo & Horror 2013
- Born: March 14, 1944
- Died: December 18, 2018 (aged 74)
- Other names: Steve Dash
- Occupation(s): Actor, stuntman
- Years active: 1977–2018

Steve Daskewisz (March 14, 1944 – December 18, 2018), also known as Steve Dash or Steve Daskawisz, was an American actor and stunt double from New York City, New York. Dash was known for his role as a stunt double for the serial killer Jason Voorhees in the film Friday the 13th Part 2.

== Life and career ==
A former cop, Dash began working as a stuntman and actor beginning in 1977. He had small roles in Wolfen and The Jazz Singer. That led to work on Sylvester Stallone's Nighthawks, where he met Cliff Cudney. Cudney hired him to replace Warrington Gillette, who was originally scheduled to play Jason in Friday the 13th Part 2. Daskewisz died on December 18, 2018, at the age of 74 due to diabetes-related complications.

== Filmography ==
Film performances
Year	Title	Role	Notes
1980	The Jazz Singer	Policeman	
1981	Nighthawks	ATAC Man #1	
1981	Ms. 45	Policeman	
1981	Friday the 13th Part 2	Jason Voorhees (masked)	
1981	Rivkin: Bounty Hunter	Policeman	
1981	Rent Control	Policeman	
1982	Alone In The Dark	Dr. Barkin	
1982	One Down, Two To Go	Policeman	
2005	13 Tazameti	Joey G	
2009	Julie & Julia	Hotel Guest	Uncredited
2009	His Name Was Jason: 30 Years of Friday the 13th	Himself	Documentary film
2010	Mr. Hush	Mac	
2011	Hemo	Neighbor	
2012	My Friends	Chuck	
2013	Crystal Lake Memories: The Complete History of Friday the 13th	Himself	Documentary film
