= Nothing Lasts Forever (film) =

1984 film

- Directed by: Tom Schiller
- Written by: Tom Schiller
- Produced by: Lorne Michaels
- Starring: Zach Galligan; Lauren Tom; Mort Sahl; Anita Ellis; Sam Jaffe; Bill Murray; Imogene Coca; Dan Aykroyd; Eddie Fisher; Rosemary De Angelis; Apollonia van Ravenstein; Paul Rogers; Calvert DeForest
- Cinematography: Fred Schuler
- Edited by: Kathleen Dougherty; Margot Francis
- Music by: Howard Shore
- Production company: Metro-Goldwyn-Mayer
- Distributed by: MGM/UA Classics
- Running time: 82 minutes
- Country: United States
- Language: English
- Budget: $3 million

Nothing Lasts Forever is a 1984 American science fiction comedy-drama film written and directed by Tom Schiller, and starring Zach Galligan and Lauren Tom, with a supporting ensemble cast including Bill Murray, Dan Aykroyd, Sam Jaffe, Imogene Coca, Eddie Fisher and Mort Sahl. John Belushi was slated to appear, but he died six weeks before production began.

Shortly before its announced release date of September 1984, Metro-Goldwyn-Mayer shelved it. The film has never been officially released theatrically or on home media in the United States, though it was eventually broadcast on Turner Classic Movies. It was once uploaded onto YouTube, but was taken down at the insistence of Turner Entertainment Co., the copyright owner of the pre-1986 Metro-Goldwyn-Mayer film library.

Production, through interviews with Tom Schiller, Lorne Michaels, Zach Galligan, Lauren Tom, Bill Murray and others involved, is chronicled in the book Nothing Lost Forever: The Films of Tom Schiller by Michael Streeter (BearManor Media, 2005).

== Plot ==
The film opens to Adam Beckett, a pianist reluctantly performing Chopin to an audience in Carnegie Hall. When Beckett is asked to play an encore, he gives away that he is not actually playing, but using a player piano. The outraged crowd storms the stage and wraps Beckett with the piano rolls.

Adam awakens on a train in Europe and realizes it was a nightmare. He is accosted by a Swedish architect, to whom he explains his stymied dreams of becoming an artist. After encouragement from him, Adam resolves to return to America to follow his dream. Upon returning, he discovers that the Port Authority has taken control of New York and is restricting entry into the city.

Upon failing a drawing test at the Port Authority, Adam is forced to work in a menial job under a trigger-happy boss. He has to watch traffic before it enters the Holland tunnel and prevent vehicles from entering with faulty parts, such as a headlight out.

Feeling he won't be creative living under his aunt and uncle's roof, Adam moves to a hotel. He is given a room whose last occupant disappeared mysteriously, leaving all of his belongings behind, including several paintings.

At work Adam meets Mara, a fellow aspiring artist. He tags along with her to SoHo and she takes it upon herself to expose them to lots of different art forms to determine which most appeals to each of them.

His kindness to a tramp leads him to be taken into an underground network where he is first cleansed by fire, then discovers that the city's tramps are controlling the destiny of all the cities in the world. They instruct him to travel to the Moon on a mission.

When Adam returns above ground he goes immediately to Mara's, but she is indifferent to him. Upset, he hurries to the city bus bound for the Moon.

In transit, the bus has different levels, one for dancing, one for dinner. Adam is the youngest by far, and one of the older ladies tells him they all have chips implanted in the back of their necks. It causes them to say Miami rather than Moon when they speak of the trip.

Upon arrival the bus is greeted by the Moon Maidens and Eloy, meant to be Adam's true love, who tells him it's too dangerous to talk. Adam jumps off the shuttle heading to the shopping at Moon-o-Rama and Eloy picks him up with a buggy to take him out of Consumerzone.

Adam awakens in an alley. He's told he must hurry to his concert in Carnegie Hall. After playing Chopin's polonaise no. 53 he receives a standing ovation. He looks up and sees Eloy waving to him from a box.

== Cast ==
- Zach Galligan as Adam Beckett
- Apollonia van Ravenstein as Mara Hofmeier
- Lauren Tom as Eloy
- Sam Jaffe as Father Knickerbocker
- Paul Rogers as Hugo
- Bill Murray as Ted Breughel
- Imogene Coca as Daisy Schackman
- Dan Aykroyd as Buck Heller
- Mort Sahl as Uncle Mort
- Anita Ellis as Aunt Anita
- Eddie Fisher as Himself
- Jan Triska as Swedish Architect
- Rosemary De Angelis as Helen Flagella
- Clarice Taylor as Lu
- John Garson as Maurice Blaget / Conductor
- Bert Wood as Hotelier
- Michael Kimak as Mr. Boyle
- King Donovan as Lunartini Husband
- Dortha Duckworth as Lunartini Wife
- Avon Long as Alphacruiser Steward
- Andrea Coles as Freida Shimkus
- Tiger Haynes as Mr. Brown
- Dr. Bronner as Himself
- Leora Dana as Joyce
- Erick Avari as Toulouse Lautrec
- Lawrence Tierney as Carriage Driver
- Peter Aykroyd as Musician (uncredited)
- Bob Balaban as Guy With Sunglasses In Espresso Bar (uncredited)
- Tom Schiller as Mara's Friend (uncredited)

== Release ==
Shortly before the scheduled release date, Metro-Goldwyn-Mayer announced Nothing Lasts Forever was being postponed. MGM never gave the film a national theatrical release. The only theatrical screening it had was at Harkins Cinema in Thomas Mall in Phoenix, Arizona in September 1984. The film has also never been available on home video in any format in the United States. In a 2019 interview with The Skinny, Schiller recalled that MGM executives were expecting the final product to mirror Animal House or Caddyshack. According to Schiller, when MGM executives watched the final print, they told him, "It's an art film." Additionally, according to a 2021 post mortem in ScreenRant, a disastrous test screening led MGM executives to fear the film was not commercially viable. More seriously, Schiller made liberal use of clips from a number of classic movies, raising concerns of potential copyright violations.

However, the film has been broadcast on TV networks, on BBC2 in the UK in 1994 as part of the Moviedrome strand, in Italy under the title "Niente dura per sempre", in Germany under the title "Alles ist vergänglich" and on Dutch television network RTL 5 in November 1993. Warner Bros., which now owns the rights to the pre-May 1986 MGM film library (via Turner Entertainment Co.), stated in 2003 and again in February 2006, that it hoped to release the film on DVD, but could not do so due to unspecified legal issues. Bill Murray and Dan Aykroyd have both agreed to take part in DVD special features, should the film finally be released.

In 2011, the film was leaked onto YouTube.

The film made its American television debut on Turner Classic Movies on January 4, 2015 as part of their "TCM Underground" programming block.

== Screenings ==
Murray and Schiller held a screening of the film on April 13, 2004, at the BAM Cinematek in Brooklyn, New York. On September 6, 2005, Murray, Schiller and Zach Galligan attended another screening, this time at Lincoln Center's Walter Reade Theater. The screening was followed by a Q&A session and a book signing of Nothing Lost Forever: The Films of Tom Schiller. The film was next screened on November 12, 2005, at the St. Louis International Film Festival. On January 28, 2006, Schiller introduced a screening at the Eastman House's Dryden Theatre in Rochester, New York. Schiller was again present for an August 22, 2007 screening at the Cinema Arts Center of Huntington, New York. The film was shown on November 6, 2009, at Olympia's Capitol Theater as part of the opening night of the Olympia Film Festival. On April 1, 2010, it screened in Los Angeles, California at Grauman's Egyptian Theatre in Hollywood as part of the American Cinematheque's acknowledgment of "criminally unknown" films, with Schiller attending and answering questions. On September 27, 2014, Schiller attended a screening of the film, followed by a Q&A at Sunray Cinema in Jacksonville, Florida.
