= Chris Durand =

American actor

Christopher Durand
- Born: Christopher Alan Durand; 7 June 1963 (age 62); New Haven, Connecticut, U.S.
- Occupations: Actor, writer, producer, stuntman
- Years active: 1989–present
- Height: 6 ft 2 in (1.88 m)

Christopher Alan Durand (born 7 June 1963), known as Chris Durand, is an American film and television actor and stuntman, who began his career in 1989.

A native of Anaheim, Orange County, California, Durand has performed stunts in over fifty films and television shows. He was a stunt performer in the television series Team Knight Rider, and The Crow (1994), among others. He played the masked serial killer Michael Myers in Halloween H20: 20 Years Later (1998). He played a multitude of demons on the television show Angel, like the demon henchman in "She", Ghostface in Scream 2 (1997), and one of the main zombies in "Resident Evil: Extinction". He can be seen as the mini-gunner in Captain America: The Winter Soldier (2014), and he also appeared in Armageddon (1998).

Durand wrote, produced, and directed the one-woman show My September. In 2002 he produced the musical Icons: The Gay and Lesbian History of the World, Vol. I, starring actor/comedian Jade Esteban Estrada. He also produced the independent film Radio America written and directed by Christopher Showerman.

He has a degree in archaeology from UCLA.
