= Spring Break (film) =

1983 film directed by Sean S. Cunningham

- Theatrical release poster
- Directed by: Sean S. Cunningham
- Written by: David Smilow
- Produced by: Sean S. Cunningham
- Starring: David Knell; Perry Lang; Paul Land; Steve Bassett
- Cinematography: Steven Poster
- Edited by: Susan Cunningham
- Music by: Harry Manfredini
- Distributed by: Columbia Pictures
- Release date: March 25, 1983
- Running time: 102 minutes
- Country: United States
- Language: English
- Budget: $4.5 million
- Box office: $24,071,666

Spring Break is a 1983 American sex comedy film directed and produced by Sean S. Cunningham. It stars David Knell, Perry Lang, Paul Land and Steve Bassett. The film follows two sets of two college guys spending a spring break together in Fort Lauderdale, Florida.

== Plot ==
Two nerds, Nelson (David Knell) and Adam (Perry Lang), are looking forward to their first spring break and book a room at an inexpensive hotel called the Breeze and Seas in Fort Lauderdale, Florida. They meet cool guys Stu (Paul Land) and O.T. (Steve Bassett) from Brooklyn, New York, when the four of them are accidentally booked into the same room. With no other places available in town, they agree to share the room. Amidst the partying, a man named Eddie (Richard B. Shull) is trying to shut down the hotel with the aim of then buying it himself.

Nelson's greedy and overbearing step-father, Ernest (Donald Symington), is running for political office. He becomes livid when he learns Nelson has shirked his assigned campaign duties. He and Nelson's widowed mother go to Florida with the intention of bringing him home. When they arrive in their yacht, Ernest hires Eddie to find his step-son.

Nelson, Adam, Stu and O.T. become fast friends while drinking, partying and taking in the local night life. O.T. and Stu have better luck with women than Nelson and Adam, but the younger boys are undeterred. One night, the four guys go to a bar holding a wet T-shirt contest. Nelson meets a girl named Susie (Jayne Modean) and accompanies her back to her hotel. She asks him to get her a soda from the lobby, but when he forgets her room number the staff throws him out.

The next day, Nelson finds Susie and explains what happened to him. He invites her to a party that night, which she accepts. Eddie, lurking nearby, manages to overhear this. Nelson and Susie meet up at the party, but have to leave when Eddie shows up with henchmen employed by Ernest. Nelson and Susie retreat to the beach, where they have sex.

Eddie finds the couple the next morning and takes Nelson to his step-father. Nelson is severely scolded and locked up in the yacht. Eddie, having been paid enough by Ernest to buy the Breeze and Seas Hotel, bribes the local building commissioner to shut the place down.

After being found and alerted by Susie, O.T. sneaks onto the yacht and frees Nelson. The four guys, Susie and a crowd of other spring breakers head to the hotel, where they get into a beer and whipped cream fight with Eddie and his henchmen. Ernest shows up and tries to throw his weight around, but Nelson gets the building inspector to admit he was bribed to shut down the hotel and stands up to Ernest and lets him know that he will no longer tolerate his domineering ways. Nelson's mother decides to divorce Ernest and he is then arrested for attempted kidnapping by the police.

With spring break over and the hotel saved, everyone says good-bye and takes a group photo to remember their adventures.

== Cast ==
- David Knell as Nelson
- Perry Lang as Adam
- Paul Land as Stu
- Steve Bassett as O.T.
- Jayne Modean as Susie
- Corinne Wahl as Joan
- Donald Symington as Ernest Dalby
- Mimi Cozzens as May Dalby
- Richard B. Shull as Eddie
- Jessica James as Geri
- Daniel Faraldo as Eesh
- Fred Buch as Ames
- Jeff Garlin as "Gut Gut"

The cast also includes Tammy Lynn Leppert in an uncredited bit part as a participant in a boxing match. Reportedly, she is also the bikini model used on the film poster. Leppert disappeared at the age of 18 from Cocoa Beach, Florida, on July 6, 1983, under mysterious circumstances and has not been seen since.

== Production ==
Victor Miller, who wrote Friday the 13th for Cunningham, said the director wanted to emulate the success of Porky's. Miller wrote a few drafts of the script but Cunningham wanted to bring in another writer, which ended the friendship between Miller and Cunningham.

== Soundtrack ==
The soundtrack for the film was issued on vinyl LP and released by Warner Brothers.

Side 1:

1. "Spring Break" by Cheap Trick
2. "One of These Days" by Gerald McMahon (Gerard McMahon)
3. "True Lovin' Woman" by Jack Mack and the Heart Attack
4. "Kids These Days" by The Dreamers
5. "Do It to You" by Hot Date

Side 2:

1. "Me and the Boys" by NRBQ
2. "Hooray for the City" by Jack Mack and the Heart Attack
3. "Friends" by Hot Date
4. "Hit the Beach" by Big Spender

The film's theme song and title track "Spring Break" by Cheap Trick was released as a single with the B-side "Get Ready". However, it failed to chart.

"Caught Up in You" by 38 Special is featured in the movie, but does not appear on the soundtrack.

== Reception ==
On the review aggregator website Rotten Tomatoes, 20% of 10 critics' reviews are positive, with an average rating of 3.5/10.
