= John Furey =

American actor (born 1951)

- Born: April 13, 1951 (age 75); U.S.
- Occupation: Actor
- Years active: 1976–present

John Furey (born April 13, 1951) is an American actor who has starred in film and on television. His film credits include Friday the 13th Part 2 (1981), Black Thunder (1998) and Land of the Free (1998). Outside of film, Furey has starred on several television series such as Queer as Folk (2001–05).

== Career ==
In 1976, Furey made his acting debut on the television series The Blue Knight. The following year, he had guest roles in the television series Eight Is Enough and Rafferty, and starred in the television film Just a Little Inconvenience. In 1978, Furey had guest starred on Emergency!, Logan's Run, and CHiPs. In 1980, Furey portrayed Chuck in Island Claws and guest starred as Stewart in The Waltons.

In 1981, Furey portrayed Paul Holt in Friday the 13th Part 2. In 1983, Furey guest starred on Cheers and Hotel. The following year, Furey guest starred on Remington Steele. In 1985, Furey portrayed Stewart on Murder, She Wrote and Winston March III on Brothers. After several television guest appearances in the mid 1980s, Furey returned to film in 1989's Mutant on the Bounty.

Furey appeared on the soap opera All My Children as Lee Hawkins in 1998. From 2001-2005, Furey guest starred as Craig Taylor on Queer as Folk.

== Personal life ==
Furey is married to actress Denise Galik. His sister, Kathleen Furey, is an actress/casting director who teaches teen acting courses in many places on Long Island, New York.

== Filmography ==
=== Film ===
Year	Title	Role	Notes
1980	Island Claws	Chuck	
1981	Friday the 13th Part 2	Paul Holt	
1989	Mutant on the Bounty	Dag	
1995	The Skateboard Kid II	Raymond Curtis	
1996	The Wolves	Connors	
1998	Black Thunder	Moore	
1998	Land of the Free	Agent Luckenbill	
2003	The Galíndez File	Norman Radcliffe	
2003	Alien Tracker	Dr. Russ Connelly	Video
2006	Scarlet Moon	Jesus Christ	
2013	Crystal Lake Memories: The Complete History of Friday the 13th	Himself	Documentary film

=== Television ===
Year	Title	Role	Notes
1976	The Blue Knight	First Party Guest	Episode: "Upward Mobility"
1977	Eight Is Enough	First Poker Player	Episode: "Is There a Doctor in the House?"
1977	Just a Little Inconvenience	Bartender	Television film
1977	Rafferty		Episode: "The Epidemic"
1978	Emergency!	Paramedic Charlie, Squad *110, LACoFD	Episode: "The Steel Inferno"
1978	Logan's Run	Philip	Episode: "Turnabout"
1978	CHiPs	Sonny	Episode: "Flashback!"
1980	The Waltons	Stewart	Episode: "The Furlough"
1980	Lou Grant	Geoffrey McAdams	Episode: "Nightside"
1983	Cheers	Larry	Episode: "The Boys in the Bar"
1983	The Renegades	Harold Primus	Episode: "Back to School"
1983	Bay City Blues	Guy Francis	3 episodes
1983–1988	Hotel	Wayne Holtz / Roy Iverson Jr.	2 episodes
1984	Remington Steele	Walter Muller	Episode: "Molten Steele"
1985	Murder, She Wrote	Stewart	Episode: "Tough Guys Don't Die"
1985	Brothers	Winston March III	Episode: "Happy Birthday, Baby Brother"
1986	T.J. Hooker	Charles A. Rolph	Episode: "The Obsession"
1986	The Paper Chase	Ted	Episode: "A Wounded Hart"
1986	Adam's Apple	Jeff Chapman	Television film
1987	Designing Women	Trevor	Episode: "Cruising"
1987	L.A. Law	Mr. Lewis	Episode: "Auld L'Anxiety"
1988	Hooperman	Deputy DA	Episode: "Surprise Party"
1988	Who's the Boss?	Judge Matthew Hamilton	Episode: "Yankee-Doodle Micelli"
1990	Jake and the Fatman	Ned Redding	Episode: "One More for the Road"
1990	Father Dowling Mysteries	Mark Tannen	Episode: "The Movie Mystery"
1990	Over My Dead Body	Dane Chalmers	Episode: "Obits and Piece"
1990	Guess Who's Coming for Christmas?	Michael	Television film
1991	Matlock	Matt Grayson	Episode: "The Parents"
1996	Baywatch Nights	Rhett Collins	Episode: "Takeover"
1996	An Unfinished Affair	Detective Wright	Television film
1996	ER	Jason Lucas	Episode: "John Carter, M.D."
1996	Women: Stories of Passion	John	Episode: "For the Sake of Science"
1997, 2003	JAG	Cmdr. Sachs	2 episodes
1998	Pensacola: Wings of Gold	Professor Albert Kerwood	Episode: "Company Town"
1998	All My Children	Lee Hawkins	10 episodes
1998	NYPD Blue	Dave Houston	Episode: "Czech Bouncer"
2000	Walker, Texas Ranger	Dennis Franklin	Episode: "Justice Delayed"
2000	Family Law	Milt Rescher	Episode: "Metamorphosis"
2000	The Pretender	Ted Wright	Episode: "Con Man"
2000	Earth: Final Conflict	Lt. Roberts	Episode: "Phantom Companion"
2001	And Never Let Her Go	Louis Capano	Television film
2001	Rough Air: Danger on Flight 534	Detective Kevin Muldoon	Television film
2001–2005	Queer as Folk	Craig Taylor	4 episodes
2002	A Killing Spring	Reed Gallagher	Television film
2002	Tracker	Dr. Russ Connelly	2 episodes
2003	Blue Murder	Brent Crowley	Episode: "Lady Killers"
2003	Law & Order: Criminal Intent	Michael Koehler	Episode: "Sound Bodies"
2004	The Guardian	Brent Ford	Episode: "Remember"
2005	Judging Amy	George St. Clair	Episode: "You Don't Know Me"
2005	CSI: Crime Scene Investigation	Councilman Gabe Miller	Episode: "Big Middle"
2006	A Little Thing Called Murder	Lt. Harold Evans	Television film
2006	Flight 93	Cleveland Controller #1	Television film
2006	Monk	Dennis	Episode: "Mr. Monk and the Class Reunion"
2006	A Daughter's Conviction	Det. Gibson	Television film
2008	As the World Turns	Mayor	Episode: "#1.13338"
2009	His Name Was Jason: 30 Years of Friday the 13th	Himself	Documentary film
2011	The Mentalist	Smarmy Man	Episode: "Every Rose Has Its Thorn"
2011	Days of Our Lives	Rob	8 episodes
2012	Harry's Law	Doctor (Expert Witness)	Episode: "The Contest"
2012–2013	Switched at Birth	Sgt. Breims	2 episodes
2013	Enlightened	Howell	Episode: "Higher Power"
