= Jayne Modean =

American model and actress (born 1957)

- Occupations: Actress, model
- Years active: 1974–1991
- Spouse: Dave Coulier (m. 1990; div. 1992)
- Children: 1

Jayne Modean is an American model and actress who got her break as a fashion model in the late 1970s, appearing on four Seventeen covers in 1977. She was the featured cover model on the February 1981 Inside Sports annual swimsuit issue.

== Career ==
In 1974, then 16-year-old Modean represented her hometown of Clifton, New Jersey, competing as Miss Teenage Clifton in the Miss Teenage America pageant, where she was selected for a Poise and Appearance award, winning a $500 scholarship.

She appeared in several feature films, including Spring Break (1983) and House II: The Second Story (1987), and a number of TV shows, including Werewolf, Cheers (1987) Full House (1990), Trauma Center (1983), Street Hawk, and The Fall Guy.

== Personal life ==
Modean married comedian Dave Coulier in 1990, and they had a son before divorcing in 1992.

== Filmography ==
=== Film ===
Year	Title	Role	Notes
1983	Spring Break	Susie	
1987	House II: The Second Story	Rochelle	
1987	Less than Zero	Cindy	

=== Television ===
Year	Title	Role	Notes
1983	The Fall Guy	Hooter	Episode: "Trauma"
1983	Trauma Center	Nurse Hooter	13 episodes
1985	Street Hawk	Sandy McCoy	Episode: "Pilot"
1985	Another World	Miss Applesauce	Episode #1.5359
1986	Comedy Factory	Terry Bishop	Episode: "Man About Town"
1987	Scarecrow and Mrs. King	Laura Mayfield	Episode: "One Flew East"
1987	Werewolf	Blonde Woman	Episode: "Nightmare at the Braine Hotel"
1987	Cheers	Tracy	Episode: "Christmas Cheers"
1989	Hard Time on Planet Earth	Lieutenant Arlene Michaels	Episode: "All That You Can Be"
1989	Not Necessarily the News	—N/a	2 episodes
1990	Full House	Adult Michelle	Episode: "Those Better Not Be the Days"
1991	Backfield in Motion	Faith	Television film
