= Zoli Agency =

Modeling agency based in New York City

- Industry: Modeling agency
- Founded: 1971
- Founder: Zoltan "Zoli" Rendessy
- Headquarters: New York City, U.S.

The Zoli Agency was a modeling agency based in New York City, particularly notable in the 1970s and 1980s. In 1981, the documentary filmmaker Frederick Wiseman released the film Model, which was filmed in part at the Zoli Agency. It was screened on PBS.

== History ==
The agency was established by a Budapest-born Hungarian designer named Zoltan "Zoli" Rendessy in 1971, as Zoli Management Inc. It was originally more geared towards male models, and was known as one of the elite male modeling agencies in the 1970s. The agency quickly made a name for itself as specializing in "fresh new faces, especially the freaky, funky, far-out varieties," as an article in People magazine put it.

The agency had a considerable number of celebrities on their books, including Jay Johnson, Veruschka (signed 1975), Geena Davis (signed 1979), Andy Warhol (signed in 1981), Louise Robey, Vanity, and Dolph Lundgren (signed 1983), although his modeling for the company was short-lived as he was described as "a bit too tall and muscular for a model's size 40".

In 1982, Rendessy died of lymphoma, having willed the agency to a group of senior employees, including Barbara Lantz, Victoria Pribble, who were majority shareholders, and Tom Laspina. In 1983, Laspina sued Lantz and Pribble over share of ownership and left the company. Later that year the agency opened an office in Hollywood to represent their clients in the movie industry. This effort was not successful and was ended in 1985.

In 1989, the modeling agency expanded to Miami Beach for the launch of Zoli South.

Zoli Management Inc. was dissolved on December 31, 2001.

== See also ==
- List of modeling agencies
