= Sarah York =

American pen pal

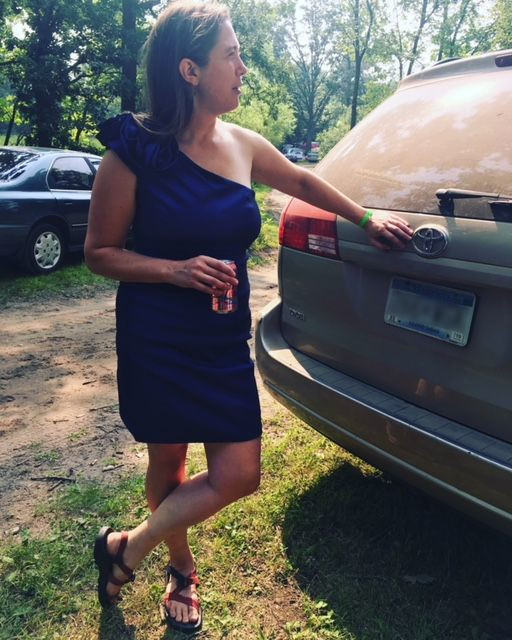
Sarah York in 2018

Sarah York (born 1978) is an American woman who, at age 10, became the pen pal of Manuel Noriega, the then-de facto ruler of Panama. She began writing to him after her father jokingly suggested it because she liked the general's hat. The correspondence led to an invitation for York's family to visit Panama, which they accepted, seeing it as a once-in-a-lifetime opportunity.

== Overview ==
York and her mother were toured through Panama from October 5 to October 11, 1988, escorted by a military guard. York, who was 10, was interviewed constantly during her visit and became the main item on the Panamanian news. The mayor of Panama City awarded her an honorary key to the city.

Upon her initial return home to Negaunee, Michigan, York was praised by her school and community. The story was then covered in national media, and the family was derided and ridiculed for befriending an enemy of the United States.

Nevertheless, York visited Noriega in Panama again the following year in October 1989, just two months before the United States invasion of Panama. Unlike the previous trip, her second visit was planned as a family vacation and was not at the invitation of Noriega. Accompanied by her father, York visited the country October 8 through October 17, meeting Noriega while there. Her parents were criticized for allowing her to visit Panama, and for encouraging her friendship with Noriega, then a highly controversial figure. After her second trip, an editorial in the local newspaper, The Mining Journal, criticized their return trip in the wake of the coup, in contrast to the previous reception a year earlier.

York has since lived on a self-sufficient farm in remote rural Wisconsin, and was interviewed by the radio show This American Life in 2003. Her story was used as the basis for a song, "Pineapple Girl" by the indie rock group, Mister Heavenly, on their 2011 album, Out of Love. She has a bachelor's degree in Latin American and Iberian Studies and Creative Writing from Bard College and a Masters of Education from St. Mary's University of Minnesota. Since 2020, she has taught Spanish at Perpich Arts High School in Golden Valley, Minnesota.

== See also ==
- Samantha Smith
- Dear Dictator
