= Bill Randolph =

American actor (born 1953)

- Born: October 11, 1953 (age 73); Detroit, Michigan

Bill Randolph (born October 11, 1953) is an American actor who has starred in films and appeared on television.

== Early life ==
Randolph attended Lincoln High School where he acted in school plays. Afterwards, he attended Allan Hancock College and studied at its PCCA theater training program. Subsequently, he graduated from SUNY Purchase with a bachelor's degree in fine arts.

== Career ==
He starred with Mercedes Hall (mother of Anthony Michael Hall) in Lanny Meyer and Arthur Morey's social protest disco musical St. Joan of the Microphone, which played in New York City parks and festivals, including the Lincoln Center Outdoor Festival, in the summer of 1977. He created the role of the club heart-throb, Supersonic Phil Harmonic.

On Broadway, he starred in the long-running play Gemini for two years.

Randolph's first feature film was the horror movie Dressed to Kill (1980), but he is best known for his role in the 1981 horror movie Friday the 13th Part 2 as Jeffrey. He also starred in the 1989 movie Penn & Teller Get Killed, and his most recent movie appearance was in the 1991 film Guilty as Charged.

He made guest appearances on TV shows such as Hill Street Blues and As the World Turns. Randolph starred in the short lived TV series Comedy Zone in 1984, and in the series Trauma Center.

Randolph retired from acting in the early 1990s to pursue a more steady career as a graphic designer and would work for the New York Daily News.

== Filmography ==
Film and Television
Year	Title	Role	Notes
1980	Dressed to Kill	Chase Cabbie	Feature film
1981	Friday the 13th Part 2	Jeff	Feature film
1983	Hill Street Blues	Dennis Kinney	Episode: "Life in the Minors"
1983	The First Time	Rick	Feature film
1983	Trauma Center	Dr. 'Beaver' Bouvier	Main cast (13 episodes)
1985	Double Negative	Alec Ealing	Short film
1988	Switching Channels	Eric	Feature film
1989	Penn & Teller Get Killed	Floor Director	Feature film
1991	Guilty as Charged	Joey	Feature film
1999	As the World Turns	Arthur	1 episode
2009	His Name Was Jason: 30 Years of Friday the 13th	Himself	Documentary film
2013	Crystal Lake Memories: The Complete History of Friday the 13th	Himself	Documentary film
