= Diana Barrows =

American actress

- Occupation(s): actress, singer, dancer
- Years active: 1986–2008
- Website: dianabarrows.com

Diana Barrows is an American film and television actress, singer and dancer.

== Filmography ==
- Rags to Riches (1987) (TV series) – (1 episode)
- Addicted to His Love (1988) (TV) – Marcy Brennan
- Friday the 13th Part VII: The New Blood (1988) – Maddy Paulson
- Charles in Charge (1988) (TV series) – Pushy Co-ed (1 episode)
- Freddy's Nightmares (1988) (TV series) – Diane (1 episode)
- She's Out of Control (1989) – Lisa
- My Mom's a Werewolf (1989) – Stacey Pubah
- The Favorite (1989) – Fanny
- Knots Landing (1989) (TV series) – Lisa (1 episode)
- Empty Nest (1990) (TV series) – Student No. 1 (1 episode)
- The Adventures of Ford Fairlane (1990) – Sorority Girl
- The End of Innocence (1990) – Arlene
- ProStars (1991–1992) (TV series) (voice) – Denise
- Space Case (1992) – Breezix
- Un homme (1997) (TV) – Margaret
- Does God Exist? (2007) (TV) – Burton's wife
- Naked Killer (2008) – Charlotte
- His Name Was Jason: 30 Years of Friday the 13th (2009) (Documentary film) – Herself
- Crystal Lake Memories: The Complete History of Friday the 13th (2013) (Documentary film) – Herself
