= Friday the 13th Part VIII: Jason Takes Manhattan =

1989 film by Rob Hedden

- Theatrical release poster
- Directed by: Rob Hedden
- Written by: Rob Hedden
- Based on: Characters by Victor Miller
- Produced by: Randolph Cheveldave
- Starring: Jensen Daggett; Scott Reeves; Barbara Bingham; Peter Mark Richman; Martin Cummins; Gordon Currie; Alex Diakun; V.C. Dupree; Saffron Henderson; Kelly Hu; Sharlene Martin; Warren Munson; Kane Hodder
- Cinematography: Bryan England
- Edited by: Steve Mirkovich
- Music by: Fred Mollin
- Production companies: Horror, Inc.
- Distributed by: Paramount Pictures
- Release date: July 28, 1989
- Running time: 100 minutes
- Countries: Canada; United States
- Language: English
- Budget: $5.1–5.5 million
- Box office: $14.3 million

Friday the 13th Part VIII: Jason Takes Manhattan is a 1989 Canadian-American slasher film written and directed by Rob Hedden. The eighth installment in the Friday the 13th franchise and a sequel to Friday the 13th Part VII: The New Blood (1988), it stars Jensen Daggett, Scott Reeves, Peter Mark Richman, and Kane Hodder reprising his role as Jason Voorhees from the previous film. Set one year after the events of The New Blood, the film follows Jason as he stalks a group of teenagers on a boat to New York City. It was the final film in the series to be distributed by Paramount Pictures in the United States until 2009, with the subsequent Friday the 13th installments being distributed by New Line Cinema.

Filming took place primarily in Vancouver, British Columbia, with additional photography in New York City's Times Square and in Los Angeles. At the time of its production, Jason Takes Manhattan was the most expensive film in the series, with a budget of over $5 million. It received substantial attention for its initial marketing campaign, featuring Jason Voorhees slashing through the "I Love New York" logo with a knife, which was later retracted after the New York City tourism committee filed a complaint against Paramount.

Released on July 28, 1989, Jason Takes Manhattan grossed $14.3 million at the domestic box office, making it the poorest-performing film in the Friday the 13th series to date. The film received overwhelmingly negative reviews by critics and fans for its plot and humor, as well as a failure to live up to its premise. The next installment in the series, Jason Goes to Hell: The Final Friday, was released in 1993.

== Plot ==
While aboard a houseboat on Crystal Lake, teenager Jim tells his girlfriend Suzi the legend of Jason Voorhees, before playing a prank on her with a hockey mask, similar to Jason's old mask, and a prop knife. The boat's anchor damages some underwater cables that shock and revive Jason, who was dragged down there by the spirit of Tina Shepard's father. (Note: As depicted in Friday the 13th Part VII: The New Blood (1988).) He sneaks on board, takes the mask, and kills Jim with a speargun before impaling Suzi.

The next morning, the SS Lazarus is ready to set sail for New York City with a graduating senior class from Lakeview High School, chaperoned by biology teacher Dr. Charles McCulloch and English teacher Colleen Van Deusen. Colleen brings Charles's niece Rennie Wickham along for the trip despite her aquaphobia, much to his chagrin. Jason sneaks on board and kills rock star-wannabe J.J. with her guitar. That night, a young boxer who lost his match to champion Julius is killed by Jason in the ship's sauna. Rennie, searching for her pet Border Collie Toby, discovers malevolent queen bee and crowned prom queen Tamara Mason and her friend Eva doing drugs. Charles nearly catches them moments later, and Tamara pushes Rennie overboard, believing she told on them. She then uses video student Wayne Webber to record Charles in a compromising situation with her but rejects Wayne's advances afterward. Jason kills Tamara with a shard of a broken mirror after she showers.

Rennie sees visions of a young Jason in different forms throughout the ship. Jason kills Admiral Robertson and his first mate Jim. Rennie's boyfriend and Captain Robertson's son, Sean, discover them and tell the others before calling for an emergency. Eva finds Tamara's body and flees. Jason chases Eva into the disco room, where he strangles her to death on the dance floor. The students agree to search for Jason while Charles decides that the deckhand is responsible. However, the deckhand is found with a fire axe in his back. Jason tosses student Miles Wolfe into the radio transmitter tower to his death, and Julius is knocked overboard. In the hold of the ship, Wayne comes upon J.J.'s body and is thrown into an electrical box by Jason. Wayne's corpse catches fire and causes the ship to take on water. With the other students that were left in the disco room seemingly dead, Charles, Colleen, Rennie, and Sean escape aboard a life raft and discover that Toby and Julius are still alive. The five then row away as the Lazarus sinks.

They row to New York City, where Jason stalks them through the streets. Rennie is kidnapped by Homes and Jojo, a pair of drug addicts, and the group splits up to find help. Julius fights Jason on a rooftop but becomes exhausted after Jason does not go down after a series of punches, and then gets decapitated by a single punch from Jason. Rennie escapes from Jason when he kills the punks that kidnapped her. She runs into Sean, and they reunite with the teachers and the NYPD before Jason kills the officer who is helping them. Rennie crashes a police car after a vision of Jason distracts her. Colleen is incinerated in the car when it explodes, and it is revealed that Charles is responsible for Rennie's fear of water, having pushed her into the lake as a child. They leave him behind, and Jason drowns him in a barrel of toxic waste.

Jason chases Rennie and Sean into the subway, where Sean incapacitates Jason by pushing him onto the third rail. When Jason revives, he chases them through Times Square to a diner and then into the sewers, where they encounter a worker. He warns them that the sewers will be flooded with toxic waste at midnight. Jason appears and kills the worker before knocking Sean unconscious. Rennie throws a vat of toxic waste into Jason's face, causing his skin to melt away. She and Sean climb a ladder as Jason staggers after them. The sewers flood, and Jason is reminded of his childhood drowning and vomits water. The wastewater overcomes Jason, washing his body away. When the water recedes, Rennie once again sees her vision of Jason as an unconscious child for the final time, finally conquering her longtime fear. Sean and Rennie return to the street, reuniting with Rennie's dog Toby in Times Square.

== Cast ==
- Kane Hodder as Jason
- Todd Caldecott as Jim Miller
- Tiffany Paulsen as Suzi Donaldson
- Jensen Daggett as Rennie Wickham
- Warren Munson as SS Lazarus Admiral Robertson
- Scott Reeves as Sean Robertson
- Jim Carlson as SS Lazarus first mate
- Alex Diakun as SS Lazarus deck hand
- Barbara Bingham as Colleen Van Deusen
- Peter Mark Richman as Dr. Charles McCulloch
- Martin Cummins as Wayne Webber
- Gordon Currie as Miles Wolfe
- V.C. Dupree as Julius Gaw
- Kelly Hu as Eva Watanabe
- Saffron Henderson as J.J. Jarrett
- Sharlene Martin as Tamara Mason
- Sam Sarkar as Homes
- Michael Benyaer as Jojo

In addition, Amber Pawlick and Timothy Burr Mirkovich appear as young Rennie and young Jason, respectively. Fred Henderson appears as Chief Petty Officer Jim Carlson, David Jacox appears as a boxer, Roger Barnes appears as an Irish NYPD officer and David Longworth appears as a sanitation engineer. Ken Kirzinger, who would go on to portray Jason Voorhees in Freddy vs. Jason (2003), appears uncredited in this film as the Times Square diner cook who confronts Jason. Kirzinger served as a stunt coordinator for this film, and doubles as Jason Voorhees in two short stunts.

== Production ==
=== Development ===
After the disappointing box-office gross of Friday the 13th Part VII: The New Blood (1988), director John Carl Buechler began developing a follow-up which reprised the character of Tina Shepard again facing off against Jason Voorhees after her release from an insane asylum. Meanwhile, Lar Park Lincoln, who had portrayed Tina Shepard, co-wrote (with her husband Michael Lincoln) an alternative screenplay which had Tina working as a psychologist for troubled girls. Lincoln's co-star in The New Blood, Kevin Spirtas, also wrote a screenplay which recast the events of The New Blood into a long dream, with his character Nick Rogers as the killer. Paramount, however, opted to assign the project of a follow-up to writer-director Rob Hedden, marking his debut feature.

A former employee of Universal Studios, Hedden strove to devise a screenplay in which the antagonist, Jason Voorhees, would travel outside of the setting of Camp Crystal Lake, the primary location of the previous seven films. "The biggest thing we could do with Jason is to get him out of that stupid lake where he's been hanging out," Hedden said. One of Hedden's original ideas was to set the film solely aboard a cruise ship with Jason hiding in the lower levels, described by Hedden as "a little bit of Das Boot and a little bit of Aliens, with a claustrophobic feeling storm at sea and that sort of stuff." The alternate concept was to place Voorhees in a large city, such as New York. Hedden commented: "Everything about New York was going to be completely exploited and milked. There was going to be a tremendous scene on the Brooklyn Bridge. A boxing match in Madison Square Garden. Jason would go through department stores. He'd go through Times Square. He'd go into a Broadway play. He'd even crawl onto the top of the Statue of Liberty and dive off."

Ultimately, after receiving approval from Paramount Pictures of both concepts, Hedden decided to combine them, with the first act of the film occurring aboard a ship, and the second on the streets of Manhattan. This decision was mainly due to budgetary restrictions from Paramount, as filming exclusively in New York City cost more than the studio was willing to spend. In addition to the shift in setting, Hedden stated he wanted to examine the character of Jason Voorhees as a child, which appears in the film in the form of hallucinations experienced by Rennie Wickham, the heroine. To conceal the fact that it was a Friday the 13th film, the initial working script circulated under the working title Ashes to Ashes.

=== Casting ===
Actress Jensen Daggett was cast as the lead of Rennie Wickham, beating out Elizabeth Berkley, Dedee Pfeiffer and Pamela Anderson for the role. Lisa Wilcox was offered a role in the film but turned it down. Scott Reeves was cast in the role of Sean Robertson at the last minute, after the producers felt the previously cast actor had no sexual chemistry with Daggett. The film marked the feature debut of actress Kelly Hu. Peter Mark Richman was cast in the film as Charles McCulloch, the students' teacher and Rennie's uncle.

=== Filming ===
The film was shot in April 1989 at seven locations in the United States, though the primary filming locations were in British Columbia, Canada, particularly Vancouver. The alleyway scenes were shot in Vancouver. After filming wrapped in Los Angeles, the rest of the film was shot on location in New York City, including Times Square. The Times Square sequences were shot while pedestrian onlookers observed the scenes, and attracted numerous Friday the 13th fans. Kane Hodder, who portrayed Jason, recalled pointing at one fan in-between takes, after which she fainted. According to Hedden, the cost of production in New York City was not feasible given the film's budget, which is why large portions of it were shot elsewhere. The budget for the film was estimated at $5 million ($11.7 million in 2025). (Note: One source states the budget as $5.5 million, while another states $5.1 million.) At the time, it was the most expensive film produced in the series.

== Music ==
Friday the 13th Part VIII: Jason Takes Manhattan

Soundtrack album by Fred Mollin
- Released: March 27, 2021 (La-La Land)
- Recorded: 1989
- Genre: Film score
- Length: 1:07:05
- Label: La-La Land

The film's musical score was composed by Fred Mollin, who worked with longtime Friday the 13th series composer Harry Manfredini on the previous installment. Friday the 13th Part VIII: Jason Takes Manhattan was the first film in the series not to feature Manfredini credited on the score. On September 27, 2005, BSX records released a limited edition CD of Fred Mollin's Friday the 13th Part VII and VIII scores.

The song "The Darkest Side of the Night" performed by Metropolis plays over the opening and ending credits to the film. Rob Hedden specifically wanted them to write a song reminiscent of Robert Plant. The song would not see an official release until the year 1999 on the album The Power of the Night.

The song "Broken Dream" which J.J. Jarrett (Saffron Henderson) jams along to on her electric guitar was written by Mollin and Stan Meissner and features Terri Crawford on vocals. The instrumental "J.J's Blues" was written by Meissner. The two songs remain popular among fans and when a fan inquired to Meissner about whether they can be released he responded that no complete versions of the songs were ever recorded as they were never intended for release outside the film. Despite this, fans noted that a longer instrumental version of the track plays during the club scene in "Dark Knight", the first episode of Forever Knight in 1992. Meissner's claim was ultimately proven false as in 2021, La-La Land Records included the full track on their release of the Friday the 13th Part VIII soundtrack which included a previously unheard chorus and lead guitar parts.

== Marketing ==
In promotion for the film, Paramount Pictures began an advertising campaign featuring Jason slashing through the "I Love New York" logo, which was featured on the original movie poster. Though the poster was distributed, it was later replaced after Vincent Tese of the New York state economic development committee filed a complaint against Paramount Pictures for unauthorized use of the "I Love New York" logo. Paramount issued a replacement poster, which featured an image of Jason looming over the New York City skyline.

In the months leading up to the film's release, its title was alternately known as Friday the 13th Part VIII: Terror in Times Square.

== Reception ==
=== Box office ===
Friday the 13th Part VIII: Jason Takes Manhattan was released on July 28, 1989, in the United States. The film entered the box office at number 5 for the weekend with earnings of $6.2 million. The film faced strong competition at the time of its release from high-profile genre fare such as A Nightmare on Elm Street 5: The Dream Child, Halloween 5: The Revenge of Michael Myers and Fright Night Part 2, and was considered one of the biggest disappointments at the summer box office. Ultimately, it would go on to gross a total of $14.3 million at the U.S. box office, making it the poorest-performing film in the franchise and ranking at number 70 on the list of the year's Top 100 earners.

=== Critical response ===
On the review aggregator website Rotten Tomatoes, Friday the 13th Part VIII: Jason Takes Manhattan holds an approval rating of 8% based on 84 reviews and an average rating of 2.3/10. The site's critics consensus reads: "Jason Takes Manhattan, but not before slicing his way through a ship-based, overly slick retread of previous Friday the 13th installments that verges on self-parody." On Metacritic, the film has a weighted average score of 14 out of 100, based on 10 critics, indicating "overwhelming dislike". Audiences polled by CinemaScore gave the film an average grade of "C+" on an A+ to F scale.

Chris Willman of the Los Angeles Times commended the film's "funny ad campaign", but deemed the film "a real dunghill" that missed the satirical potential of having Jason's evil being dwarfed by real life evils. He called the script "as witless and willfully imbecilic as any of the preceding seven". The New York Daily News criticized the film for "grossly underutilizing its promising premise" but said that it "should please Friday fanatics and shapes up as a marginally watchable fright item for the genre's more demanding fans." Desmond Ryan of the Asbury Park Press wrote: "Common sense should tell you to skip this film" and called the characters very stupid. The Philadelphia Daily News's Gary Thompson called the film "gory and conventional" but praised the "change of scenery and occasional dashes of humor", which make it a better than average entry in the series.

Malcolm Johnson of the Hartford Courant deemed the film a "snoozer" and criticized its humor. Although he said younger fans who sneak in to the theater may enjoy the humor, he felt non-fans would find it a "clumsy reworking of the formula". Mike Dembs of the Detroit Free Press awarded the film a zero-star rating and called it "the worst of the bunch", and a disappointment even for fans. The Atlanta Constitution's Eleanor Ringel wrote that the film "isn't in the least bit scary and is only intermittently gory. It is, however, often quite funny, intentionally or not." She also criticized the film because a significant portion of it took place aboard a boat as opposed to in Manhattan, a sentiment echoed by Betsy Sherman of The Boston Globe, who wrote that the film "should have been called Jason Takes a Cruise". Film critic Leonard Maltin awarded the film two out of four stars, and called it the best in the series. Maltin complimented the film's imaginative direction, but criticized the film's runtime.

Adam Marcus, who directed the sequel Jason Goes to Hell: The Final Friday, said the franchise's premise had become untenable after a hundred teenagers had died at Camp Crystal Lake. He felt sending Jason out in search of new victims in New York City was a good idea, but result was a film that insulted the audience by putting Jason on a boat for most of the film's runtime. On his commentary track for the film in the box set, director Rob Hedden acknowledges the faults and agrees that more of the film should have been set in Manhattan, citing budgetary and schedule problems.

=== Legacy ===
In 2007, Entertainment Weekly labeled Jason Takes Manhattan the eighth-worst sequel ever made. In 2018, Scott Meslow of GQ wrote that the film was among the "most stylish" in the Friday the 13th series and said that it was "actually a pretty good" sequel despite the misleading title. He also liked the idea of setting the film on a boat, which he thought made the film more claustrophobic. When Jason arrives in Manhattan, he was amused by Jason being dismissed by New Yorkers as "just another weirdo walking the streets". Paramount Pictures producer Chad Villella said the creative team behind Scream VI (2023), including directors Matt Bettinelli-Olpin and Tyler Gillett, studied Jason Takes Manhattan before starting shooting the sixth Scream installment, which also takes place in New York City. The Scream filmmakers wanted to achieve the atmosphere of feeling alone even when surrounded by millions of people, despite the protagonists no longer being present at Woodsboro.

In the sixth episode titled "Kill Them, Mommy" from the prequel television series Crystal Lake, Pamela Voorhees is carrying a burlap sack of supplies with the name SS Lazarus (a reference from the ship's name in the film), to Jason's fortress in the forest.

== Home media ==
Paramount Home Video initially released the film on VHS on February 15, 1990. The company re-released the film on VHS on September 28, 1994. A standard DVD without bonus materials was released by Paramount on September 3, 2002. In October 2004, a box set, Crystal Lake to Manhattan, was released, featuring Jason Takes Manhattan alongside the previous seven Friday the 13th films. This release featured an audio commentary with writer-director Hedden. A standalone "deluxe edition" DVD was subsequently released in September 2009, featuring Hedden's commentary, a making-of documentary, a gag reel, and deleted sequences.

Paramount issued a double-feature Blu-ray on September 8, 2015, featuring the film paired with its predecessor, Friday the 13th Part VII: The New Blood. Jason Takes Manhattan was subsequently included in two separate Blu-ray sets: First in 2013's Friday the 13th: The Complete Collection, which included every film in the series, along with the 2009 reboot; and again in 2018 in The Ultimate Collection, which included the first eight Paramount-owned films only.

== Sources ==
- Bracke, Peter (2006). Crystal Lake Memories. United Kingdom: Titan Books. ISBN 1-84576-343-2.
- Harper, Jim (2004). Legacy of Blood: A Comprehensive Guide to Slasher Movies. United Kingdom: Critical Vision. ISBN 978-1-900-48639-2.
- Maltin, Leonard (2013). Leonard Maltin's Movie Guide: 2014 Edition : the Modern Era. New York: Plume Books. ISBN 978-0-14-218055-6.
