= On the Cover =

On the Cover may refer to:

- On the Cover, a 2009 album by MxPx
- On the Cover, a 2004 game show broadcast by Ion Television
