= List of Freddy's Nightmares episodes =

Freddy's Nightmares is a television series spin-off of the successful film series A Nightmare on Elm Street. In the United States, the first episode of the series originally aired on October 8, 1988. The series ran for two seasons, ending on March 12, 1990, after 44 episodes.

The series has had a limited release on VHS in the United States, United Kingdom, Australia, Brazil, Italy, and the Netherlands. In the United States, the series was released on September 11, 1991, in five volumes, with one episode per volume. The UK released eight volumes, with two episodes per volume. The other countries released the same episodes as that of the UK release. The UK released a two volume DVD set on June 9, 2003.

== Series overview ==
| Season | Episodes | Originally released | |
| Season | Episodes | First released | Last released |
|---|---|---|---|
| 1 | 22 | October 8, 1988 | May 27, 1989 |
| 2 | 22 | October 9, 1989 | March 5, 1990 |

== Episodes ==
With the exception of the pilot, all of the episodes carried two separate storylines. The first half hour would be devoted to one story, while the last half hour would be devoted to a second storyline.

=== Season 1 (1988–89) ===
| No. overall | No. in season | Title | Directed by | Written by | Original release date |
|---|---|---|---|---|---|
| 1 | 1 | "No More Mr. Nice Guy" | Tobe Hooper | Rhet Topham, Michael De Luca, and David Erhman | October 8, 1988 |
Freddy Krueger has slain many children and teenagers, and is currently on the loose, but after a police officer catches Freddy trying to kill his daughters, Freddy is arrested. During the trial, the judge unfortunately discovers Freddy was never read his rights, so the judge must let him go, but it does not end there.
| 2 | 2 | "It's a Miserable Life" | Tom McLoughlin | Michael De Luca and Paul Rosselli | October 15, 1988 |
A fast food employee (John Cameron Mitchell) hates his life, but when someone robs the restaurant, his life gets a little more interesting. Meanwhile, his girlfriend (Lar Park Lincoln) is tormented by hospital staff after she was shot.
| 3 | 3 | "Killer Instinct" | Mick Garris | Allen B. Ury | October 22, 1988 |
A runner (Yvette Nipar) accidentally kills her rival (Lori Petty) by using a magical charm she stole from her that lets whatever she is imagining happen.
| 4 | 4 | "Freddy's Tricks and Treats" | Ken Wiederhorn | A. L. Katz and Gil Adler | October 29, 1988 |
A college student (Mariska Hargitay) is tormented by Freddy after he hears that she does not believe in him.
| 5 | 5 | "Judy Miller, Come on Down" | Tom DeSimone | Jack Temchin and Michael De Luca | November 5, 1988 |
Judy Miller (Siobhan E. McCafferty) wins big money on a game show, which solves life's little nightmares while creating newer, more tragic nightmares. The episode features Susan Oliver as the maid (and Judy Miller's future self), and marks the final appearance of Oliver before her death in 1990.
| 6 | 6 | "Saturday Night Special" | Lisa Gottlieb | James Nathan and Don Bohlinger | November 12, 1988 |
Two nobodies yearn for perfection. Gordon (Scott Burkholder) fantasizes a dream date with a sex goddess, Lana (Shari Shattuck). Meanwhile, Lana's low self-esteem roommate Mary (Molly Cleater / Joyce Hyser) undergoes a radical transformation.
| 7 | 7 | "Sister's Keeper" | Ken Wiederhorn | Jeff Freilich and Michael De Luca | November 19, 1988 |
In this sequel to the pilot episode, the twin daughters of the cop who killed Freddy are now being haunted by Freddy so the twins plot to find a way to get Krueger out of their dreams for good.
| 8 | 8 | "Mother's Day" | Michael Lange | David Ehrman | November 26, 1988 |
When Billy's (Byron Thames) mother and new stepfather go on their honeymoon, he meets neighbor Barbara (Jill Whitlow) who convinces him to throw a party that proves to be fatal. Meanwhile, a radio psychologist (Elizabeth Savage) finds herself in hot water when she gives her callers bad advice.
| 9 | 9 | "Rebel Without a Car" | John Lafia | Christopher Trumbo | December 10, 1988 |
Alex (Craig Hurley) finds an abandoned muscle car to be his "ticket out of Springwood". Instead he keeps envisioning the fate of the previous owner. Connie (Katie Barberi) is determined to belong to a sorority, but the initiation process puts her through her own private Hell.
| 10 | 10 | "The Bride Wore Red" | George Kaczender | Howard Lakin Green | December 17, 1988 |
Jessica (Diane Franklin) is a newlywed with deep-seated fears of infidelity and divorce brought on by her cheating, domineering father. She becomes an avenging angel who seduces and exposes cheating husbands, but the disintegration of her parents' marriage drives her insane.
| 11 | 11 | "Do Dreams Bleed?" | Dwight Little | Michael De Luca | January 7, 1989 |
A man has dreams that depict information about a local killer, "The Springwood Chopper". In the second part, everyone believes the Chopper is behind bars, but the real killer may still be on the loose.
| 12 | 12 | "The End of the World" | Jonathan Betuel | James Cappe | January 14, 1989 |
A woman discovers she can change events that happened to her in her childhood, altering her life. Soon she is discovered by the CIA and they use her to prevent a nuclear disaster. Guest starring George Lazenby.
| 13 | 13 | "Deadline" | Michael Lange | Jill Donner | January 28, 1989 |
A washed-up newspaper editor is given a story of a lifetime, but finds out the paper tells the future, and sees an article about him committing suicide. Emily has seemingly met the man of her dreams in Johnny, but he may not be who he seems.
| 14 | 14 | "Black Tickets" | George Kaczender | Howard Lakin | February 4, 1989 |
Rick (Brad Pitt) and Miranda are teenage lovers who leave Springwood. Their car stalls so they check into a hotel, but the hotel is run by sadistic hicks. Also Miranda might be pregnant but is trying to hold down her job while coming to terms with potentially being a mother.
| 15 | 15 | "School Daze" | Michael Klein | David Ehrman | February 11, 1989 |
Steve Dart, a student at Springwood High School, decides to take it easy to escape stress. When he is called to the principal's office he starts having nightmares and soon discovers the high school's shocking secret. In the second half, Matt is a young Springwood High School student whose SATs are coming up soon. He begins to have strange nightmares and illusions of his life if he fails his SATs.
| 16 | 16 | "Cabin Fever" | Robert Englund | Rhet Topham | February 18, 1989 |
An airline heir discovers he is on a flight to Hell. A flight attendant thinks she has found Mr. Right.
| 17 | 17 | "Love Stinks" | John Lafia | Jeff Freilich and Michael De Luca | February 25, 1989 |
After teenager Adam is coerced into cheating on Laura (Tamara Glynn) with Loni, a girl he meets at a party, he finds that she is looking for a more permanent relationship. Meanwhile, Adam's friend Max is forced to abandon his planned summer trip and take a job in a pizza place working under his creepy, tyrannical uncle (Jeffrey Combs).
| 18 | 18 | "The Art of Death" | Ken Wiederhorn | Michael De Luca and Ken Wiederhorn | March 11, 1989 |
A young artist's comic is brought to life; a claustrophobic woman is tormented by her roommate's friend.
| 19 | 19 | "Missing Persons" | Jeff Freilich | Jeff Freilich | May 6, 1989 |
A college student (Eva LaRue) with past weight problems goes back to her childhood house to babysit two children who love junk food; a man (Timothy Bottoms) soon regrets his wish of spending a day in the life of another person.
| 20 | 20 | "The Light at the End of the Tunnel" | Jonathan Betuel | James Cappe and Jonathan Betuel | May 13, 1989 |
A man tries to overcome his fear of the dark after getting a job in the sewer; a pornographic store owner becomes trapped in his nightmares.
| 21 | 21 | "Identity Crisis" | David K. Calloway | Rebecca J. Pogrow | May 20, 1989 |
An ex-hippie (Jeff Conaway) who still values peace and love above all else gets crosswise with his son and his money-obsessed boss; a teen (Kimberley Kates) who shares nothing with her mother asks pointblank if she was adopted and does not receive the answer she was looking for.
| 22 | 22 | "Safe Sex" | Jerry Olson | David J. Schow | May 27, 1989 |
A teenager is in love with a goth girl who is obsessed with Freddy Krueger and soon enough the teenager is plagued with dreams involving Freddy. In the second half, the goth girl is tormented by the man of her dreams.

=== Season 2 (1989–90) ===
| No. overall | No. in season | Title | Directed by | Written by | Original release date |
|---|---|---|---|---|---|
| 23 | 1 | "Dream Come True" | George Kaczender | Tom Blomquist | October 9, 1989 |
A therapist who tries to help a boy suffering from repeated nightmares about Freddy Krueger winds up dreaming about the killer as well. Meanwhile, a cameraman who wants to settle the question of Freddy's existence for good gets drawn into his own news story.
| 24 | 2 | "Heartbreak Hotel" | William Malone | Jonathan Glassner | October 16, 1989 |
A tabloid reporter learns that the stories he has been fabricating are coming true when he is sent into the field to write about an Elvis sighting; an amnesiac whose memory is returning in bits and pieces worries that he may have killed someone.
| 25 | 3 | "Welcome to Springwood" | Ken Wiederhorn | A. L. Katz and Gilbert Adler | October 23, 1989 |
Doug and Roxanne move to Springwood, but while Doug's at work, Roxanne begins to unpack and discovers that a mix-up with the movers has left their house filled with someone else's possessions – in the boxes she finds bloody knives and shredded dresses. Meanwhile, Emily discovers a stack of 19th century love letters hidden behind a panel in her new home, and she begins to envision the relationships of the authors.
| 26 | 4 | "Photo Finish" | Tom DeSimone | Jonathan Glassner | October 30, 1989 |
A photographer (Patty McCormack) who is anxious to get her career back on track gets some unexpected help on her latest photo shoots from Freddy, who is terrorizing her models. Meanwhile, three FBI agents come to Springwood to investigate a family homicide, but Freddy has some surprises in store for them.
| 27 | 5 | "Memory Overload" | Don Weis | Michael Kirschenbaum | November 6, 1989 |
Professor Windom is a man with a drinking problem. But he has to get over his fears, and quickly, as a former student of his is in a lot of trouble and needs his help. Barbara starts getting stressed out when her computer starts talking to her and believes she is going to be in trouble with the cops for tax evasion. Unwittingly, she jumps into her computer to stop a certain file from being saved.
| 28 | 6 | "Lucky Stiff" | William Malone | David Braff | November 13, 1989 |
A recent widow (Mary Crosby) comes to the realization that her late husband (David L. Lander) purchased a winning lottery ticket, so she goes to great lengths to recover it – and keep the winnings for herself. Meanwhile, a grave digger (Tracey Walter) resorts to blackmail to land the woman of his dreams.
| 29 | 7 | "Silence Is Golden" | Chuck Braverman | Jonathan Glassner | November 20, 1989 |
After accidentally assaulting a mime, obnoxious radio disc jockey Rick Rake is tormented by the clown. Meanwhile, it turns out that the mime is also a burglar who learns that the last people he robbed were also killed.
| 30 | 8 | "Bloodlines" | James Quinn | Gilbert Adler and A. L. Katz | November 27, 1989 |
An escaped convict (Marc Alaimo) returns home to retrieve the money he hid from a bank robbery, and discovers his son is bitter and his wife (Sheree North) has lost her mind. Later, a couple (Chris Nash and Ruth de Sosa) illegally adopts a baby, but as the little girl (Irina Cashen) grows, her new parents come to the realization that she may be evil.
| 31 | 9 | "Monkey Dreams" | Robert Englund | Michael Kirschenbaum | December 4, 1989 |
In this follow-up to "Memory Overload", a gambling-addict lab researcher must race to complete his work before his bookie's enforcers show up to collect. In the second half, another researcher has nightmares about his treatment of a chimpanzee test subject.
| 32 | 10 | "Do You Know Where Your Kids Are?" | Bill Froelich | Wayne Rice | December 11, 1989 |
In this follow-up to "Bloodlines", teenager Lisa (Suzanne Tara) agrees to swap babysitting duties with her friend, Heidi (Julie St. Claire) as a favor. She discovers that a relative who is locked in the family's cellar wants revenge - even invading her dreams to get it.
| 33 | 11 | "Dreams That Kill" | Tom De Simone | Tom Blomquist | December 18, 1989 |
In this sequel to "Dream Come True", Charlie Nichels, the new host of Springwood Confidential, receives a warning from Freddy not to proceed with his latest show topic: "Dreams That Kill." Meanwhile, a doctor performs an experimental brain matter transplantation surgery on a patient that results in the man awakening with another man's personality—and dreams.
| 34 | 12 | "It's My Party and You'll Die If I Want You To" | Tom DeSimone | Jonathan Glassner and David Braff | December 25, 1989 |
In this sequel to "Photo Finish", a fake psychic (Gwen Banta) gets possessed by Freddy during a trance and Krueger, using the psychic's body, starts killing people off. The second half is about Freddy crashing his class reunion to seek revenge on a girl who stood him up at the prom.
| 35 | 13 | "What You Don't Know Can Kill You" | Ken Wiederhorn | Jonathan Glassner | January 8, 1990 |
A lecherous psychiatrist who hypnotizes and seduces his female patients is caught in the act by a colleague, so he hatches a devious plot to get out of doing time. Meanwhile, a dyslexic man who accidentally murdered the psychiatrist under a trance is convinced by his girlfriend to undergo surgery to alter his appearance, but the face they choose also belongs to a mobster.
| 36 | 14 | "Easy Come, Easy Go" | William Malone | David Braff | January 15, 1990 |
In this follow-up to "Lucky Stiff", Greta, who has already murdered to avoid sharing her first husband's lottery winnings, devises a plan to rub out her current husband. Later, Greta finds out a deep, dark family secret when her sister Peggy drops in with her new husband for a surprise visit.
| 37 | 15 | "Prime Cut" | David Calloway | Michael Kirschenbaum | January 22, 1990 |
During a camping trip, a female tracker's strange behavior leads the men to believe that she may be a vampire. Later, plane crash survivors are forced to eat the corpses of the dead to survive. As the fiancee of one survivor desperately searches for the wreckage, an escaped convict also wanders through the mountains.
| 38 | 16 | "Interior Loft" | Ken Wiederhorn | David Braff | January 29, 1990 |
After Kim leaves her job to pursue her dream of writing a novel, her husband, David, convinces her to make an erotic recording on a 976 number to bring in extra cash. But Kim starts to have a mental breakdown when an obsessed caller begins murdering. Meanwhile, after reading Kim's manuscript, David wonders if Kim has herself assumed the murderous, sexually deviant personality of the heroine of her novel.
| 39 | 17 | "Interior Loft – Later" | Ken Wiederhorn | Jonathan Glassner | February 5, 1990 |
In this follow-up to "Interior Loft", an artist (Robert F. Lyons) fakes his own death to both increase the value of his work and avoid prosecution for the accidental death of one of his models. Trapped in his apartment, he becomes stir crazy and accuses his wife (Fabiana Udenio) of having an affair. Later, two ladies (Leslie Bega, Tory Polone) reluctantly agree to let a guy (Dean Fortunato) move into their loft, and he quickly begins playing them both.
| 40 | 18 | "Funhouse" | Gilbert Adler | Al Katz and Gilbert Adler | February 12, 1990 |
In this follow-up to "Welcome to Springwood", a couple moves into a house that is allegedly haunted, but after a few strange occurrences, the wife realizes who the ghost is. Later another couple moves into the house and form a most unusual relationship with the moving man.
| 41 | 19 | "A Family Affair" | Keith Samples | David Braff | February 19, 1990 |
In this follow-up to "Silence is Golden", Paul scorns his lover, Claire, making him resort to drastic measures to ensure his family never learns of their affair. Later, a guilt-ridden man who is trying to reconcile with his son learns that it is not possible to cheat death.
| 42 | 20 | "Dust to Dust" | Jonathan Glassner | Bill Froehlich, David Braff, and Jonathan Glassner | February 26, 1990 |
In this follow-up to "Prime Cut", three recovering cannibals have an unfortunate relapse and wind up eating an intruder who is being afflicted with a strange disease.
| 43 | 21 | "Prisoner of Love" | Richard T. Schor | Richard BeBan | March 5, 1990 |
A priest who is giving the last rites to a woman on death row is seduced, and he plans an unimaginable escape from the death house with a tragic ending. Violet Rodriguez tries to escape the same way as the other prisoner tried, hopefully with better results.
| 44 | 22 | "Life Sentence" | Anita W. Addison | David Zuckerman | March 12, 1990 |
In this follow-up to "Prisoner of Love", Andy Caulfield is a prisoner who is about to get parole, until he is faced with a prison counselor who also happens to be a relative of one of his victims. The second half centers on Warden Hendler, who is using prisoners as guinea pigs to test a new drug for extracting vital information, until the experiment backfires with drastic results.
