= Stan Meissner =

Canadian songwriter and singer

- Born: Stanley Allan Meissner; August 28, 1956 (age 70); Toronto, Ontario, Canada
- Genres: Pop rock
- Occupation: Singer-songwriter
- Instruments: Vocals, drums, guitar, keyboards
- Website: stanmeissner.com

Stan Meissner (born August 28, 1956) is a Canadian composer, singer, and songwriter.

Stan Meissner's career includes both hits in Canada and internationally abroad. Having been a composer and songwriter for nearly 50 years, he has written and composed music for many international acts, artists and tv-series.

== Career ==
As a singer, Stan Meissner has released three CDs: Dangerous Games (1984), Windows to Light (1986) and Undertow (1992) on A&M and Duke Street/Universal garnering several top 10 hits in Canada.

As a songwriter, his songs have been recorded by Celine Dion, Eddie Money, Ricochet, LeeAnn Womack, Farmer's Daughter, Rita Coolidge, BJ Thomas, Alias, Ben Orr (The Cars), Darby Mills, Lee Aaron, Carl Dixon, Toronto and Lara Fabian. In addition, Meissner has written music for several TV shows and films including Beverly Hills 90210, Hang Time, Forever Knight, Tekwar, Sweating Bullets/Tropical Heat, Little Criminals (CBC), Phenom, Tales from the Crypt, A&E Biography, Amy Fisher: My Story, My Secret Identity, Friday the 13th Parts 7 & 8, Friday the 13th: The Series, Ghoulies 3, Life Goes On, Shining Time Station, The Berenstain Bears and Timothy Goes to School.

Stan Meissner is also the creative force behind the duo Metropolis with Peter Fredette. The Metropolis debut CD included the hit "The Darkest Side of the Night", which was featured as the title track in Friday the 13th Part VIII: Jason Takes Manhattan.

Stan Meissner is the past president of SOCAN, having served as the president and chairman of the board of directors (2012–2018), and having previously served as Treasurer (2003–2012) and President of the SOCAN Foundation (2006–2012). He is also the chairman of the board of directors of the Canadian Songwriters Hall of Fame (2012–present), and he has served as president of the Songwriters Association of Canada (2000–2006). He has been very active in the songwriting community, working as a tireless advocate to further a more positive environment for creators in Canada and around the world.

== Discography ==
=== Studio albums ===
- Dangerous Games (1984)
- Windows to Light (1986)
- Undertow (1992)

=== with Metropolis ===
- The Power of the Night (1999)

=== Singles ===
- "I Need Your Love" / "Walking in the Dark" (A&M, 1984)
- "Hide the Night Away" / "Walk Out of My Life" (A&M, 1984)
- "Once Over" / "Once Over" (A&M, 1984)
- "One Chance" / "Coming out of Nowhere" (A&M, 1985)
- "I Want Everything" / "Surrender to You" (A&M, 1986)
- "Can't Break Away from You" / "I Need Your Love" (A&M, 1986)
- "River of Fire" (Duke Street 1992)
- "It's No Secret" (Duke Street 1992)
- "Someone Like You" (Duke Street 1993)
- "The Lucky One" (Duke Street 1993)

== Awards ==
Meissner's work has earned him numerous gold and multi-platinum records, as well as a Gemini Award, two JUNO nominations, Canadian Music Publishers Association Award, British Columbia Country Music Association ‘Songwriter of the Year’ Award, and a SOCAN #1 Award.

- Gemini Award recipient for music on CBC's 'It's Only Rock And Roll'
- B.C. Country Music Association 'Songwriter of the Year' – 1999
- Juno Award nominee 'Songwriter of the Year' – 2000
- Juno Award nominee 'Most Promising Male Vocalist' −1986
- Socan No. 1 Award for writing 'Leila' (1995 – sung by Lara Fabian)
- Socan Airplay Award for 'Il Suffit D'une Eclair' (1994 – sung by Lara Fabian)
- Socan Airplay Award for 'Leila' (1995 – sung by Lara Fabian)
- Canadian Music Publishers Award for 'One Chance' (among the top Canadian hits of 1987–1988)
- Multiple RIAA and CRIA Gold and Platinum Records
