= 13 Fanboy =

- Film poster
- Directed by: Deborah Voorhees
- Screenplay by: Joel Paul Reisig; Derborah Voorhees
- Produced by: Joel Paul Reisig; Deborah Voorhees
- Starring: Dee Wallace; Hayley Greenbauer; Deborah Voorhees; Kane Hodder; Judie Aronson; Lar Park Lincoln; Corey Feldman; Tracie Savage; CJ Graham; Jennifer Banko
- Cinematography: Ben Meredith; Daniel Zollinger
- Edited by: Riley C. Morris; Deborah Voorhees
- Music by: Tamer Ciray
- Production company: Voorhees Films
- Distributed by: Deskpop Entertainment
- Release date: October 22, 2021
- Running time: 101 minutes
- Country: United States
- Language: English
- Box office: $11,572

13 Fanboy is a 2021 American meta-slasher film directed by Deborah Voorhees and written and produced by her and Joel Paul Reisig. The film focuses on numerous actors that starred in a popular slasher film franchise who find themselves as the target of an obsessed fan that wants to replicate their death scenes in real life. It stars Hayley Greenbauer as Kelsie Voorhees, with Dee Wallace, Deborah Voorhees, C.J. Graham, Kane Hodder, Corey Feldman, Lar Park Lincoln, Judie Aronson, and Tracie Savage as fictionalized versions of themselves.

The film was conceived during the notable Friday the 13th lawsuit that prevented further films to be made. Although featuring an ensemble cast of Friday the 13th actors, it is wholly disparate in terms of tone and style and has no connections to the mythology of the Jason Voorhees saga.

The film was released in select drive-in theaters and video-on-demand on October 22, 2021.

== Synopsis ==
After witnessing the murder of her grandmother Deborah Voorhees, a famous Friday the 13th actress, Kelsie Voorhees is left traumatized as a child. When other Friday the 13th actresses begin to fall victim to the killer, an adult Kelsie finds herself as the target of the deranged fan that wants to replicate the horror franchise's death scenes in real life after risking her life to save her grandmother's best friend Dee Wallace.

== Cast ==
- Dee Wallace as herself
- Hayley Greenbauer as Kelsie Voorhees
  - Poppy Gillett as the young Kelsie Voorhees
- Deborah Voorhees as herself: Deborah had a supporting role as Tina in Friday the 13th: A New Beginning (1985).
- C.J. Graham as himself: Graham portrayed Jason Voorhees in Friday the 13th Part VI: Jason Lives (1986).
- Kane Hodder as himself: Hodder portrayed numerous incarnations of the murderous Jason Voorhees in the Friday the 13th franchise.
- Judie Aronson as herself: Aronson portrayed Samantha in Friday the 13th: The Final Chapter (1984).
- Drew Leighty as Chris: Leighty portrayed Kyle McCleod in Never Hike Alone: A Friday the 13th Fan Film (2017).
- Lar Park Lincoln as herself: Lincoln portrayed Tina Shepard in Friday the 13th Part VII: The New Blood (1988).
- Tracie Savage as herself: Savage portrayed Debbie in Friday the 13th Part III (1982).
- Ron Sloan as himself: Sloan portrayed Junior in Friday the 13th: A New Beginning (1985).
- Corey Feldman as Mike Merryman: Feldman portrayed the younger version of recurring hero Tommy Jarvis.
- Jennifer Banko as herself: Banko portrayed Young Tina in Friday the 13th Part VII: The New Blood (1988).
- Tiffany Helm as herself: Helm portrayed Violet Moraine in Friday the 13th: A New Beginning (1985).

== Release ==
13 Fanboy was originally scheduled for release in 2020, but was pushed back due to the COVID-19 pandemic. The film was later released in theaters and VOD on October 22, 2021. It was released on DVD on March 8, 2022 by Mill Creek Entertainment.
