= The Power of the Night =

Studio album by Metropolis
- Released: October 20, 1999
- Studio: Wychwood Studio, Toronto
- Genre: Hard rock; AOR
- Length: 48:59
- Label: MTM Music Group; SPV
- Producer: Stan Meissner

The Power of the Night is the only album by hard rock group Metropolis. The album was released on October 20, 1999 through MTM Music Group. The song "The Darkest Side of the Night" was originally featured in the 1989 film Friday the 13th Part VIII: Jason Takes Manhattan.

== Track listing ==
All songs written by Peter Fredette and Stan Meissner, except where noted.

No.	Title	Writer(s)	Length
1.	"Wild & Blue"		4:08
2.	"The Darkest Side of the Night"	Mollin and Meissner	4:55
3.	"Never Look Back"		3:43
4.	"Walk Through the Fire"		3:54
5.	"Restless Moon"		5:09
6.	"A Million Miles Away"		4:33
7.	"Whatever It Is"		4:00
8.	"The Eyes of Love"	McTaggart, Fredette and Meissner	5:12
9.	"The Best Is Good Enough"		4:33
10.	"Runnin' After a Dream"		3:37
11.	"The Power of the Night"		5:19
Total length:			48:59

Japan bonus track
No.	Title	Writer(s)	Length
12.	"Love and Desire"	Meissner	3:55
Total length:			52:54

== Personnel ==
Credits adapted from AllMusic:

Metropolis

- Peter Fredette – bass, vocals
- Stan Meissner – drums, guitar, keyboards, vocals, producer

Additional personnel

- Nick Blagona – mastering
- Patrick Duffy – art direction, design
- Rob Waymen – photography
