= Robert LaSardo =

American actor

- Born: September 20, 1963 (age 63); Brooklyn, New York, U.S.
- Occupation: Actor
- Years active: 1987–present

Robert LaSardo (born September 20, 1963) is an American character actor.

== Early life ==
LaSardo was born in Brooklyn, New York City, and is of Puerto Rican and Italian-American descent. He began his career studying at the High School of Performing Arts in New York City where he became an honors student, before attending the Stella Adler Studio of Acting. He spent four years in the U.S. Navy. For two of those years, he handled Navy attack dogs in the Aleutian Islands. LaSardo was stationed on Adak Island, in the middle of the Aleutian chain, with LaSardo saying that the weather was "atrocious", and that alcoholism and depression was rife among others serving there. As part of the Navy, he would also go on to spend time in Africa, Australia, Fiji, Indonesia, the Philippines, and Saudi Arabia.

== Career ==
LaSardo started his acting career in 1987 with the independent film China Girl by Abel Ferrara. He was cast in the 1990 Steven Seagal film Hard to Kill, and LaSardo claimed that Seagal took a liking to him, helping him get cast in his next project Out for Justice. After several smaller roles he appeared in such TV series as The X-Files, CSI: Miami, Nip/Tuck and Femme Fatales, most often playing bad guys, in particular drug dealers or gang leaders. He also appeared in feature films as bad guys in several movies, including Waterworld, Death Race and The Mule.

Robert Lasardo as Hector ‘The Grim Reaper’ Grimm, in Death Race (2008).

In 2024, LaSardo wrote, directed, executive produced, and starred in the independent drama American Trash. The film marked his feature directorial debut and represented a departure from the crime and action roles for which he had become known. In the film, he portrays a military veteran struggling with post-traumatic stress disorder, environmental concerns, grief, and personal redemption. American Trash was noted as a personal project for LaSardo, who also received writing and producer credits.

Rotten Tomato critic Bee Delores (B-Sides & Badlands) praised the film, stating “Robert LaSardo delivers one of his most captivating films to date, permitting himself to dig deeper than he ever has before.”

In addition to acting, LaSardo has worked as a producer and screenwriter on several independent film projects, expanding his career beyond performing into filmmaking.

He has appeared often in independent horror movies, such as in The Human Centipede 3 (Final Sequence), Autopsy, and Parlor. In 2020, he appeared in Hope for the Holidays with Sally Kirkland.

In December 2021, it was reported that LaSardo had been cast in The Legend of Jack and Diane, a feature film described as a female-led revenge thriller written and directed by Bruce Bellocchi, starring Tom Sizemore, Lydia Zelmac, David Tomlinson and Carlo Mendez. Filming began in Los Angeles on January 17, 2022.

In 2022, it was announced that LaSardo would star in the horror film Camp Pleasant Lake alongside Jonathan Lipnicki.

In 2026, LaSardo appeared in the independent horror series Zombie Me, a psychological horror web series that began in 2026 and features him in the role of Blake Harrison. The series is produced as an independent online project and is distributed through its official website and associated digital platforms.

== Personal life ==
LaSardo lives with his family in California.

Due to his work in the Navy, he supports USA Cares, an organization that supports families of soldiers.

== Filmography ==
=== Films ===
Year	Title	Role	Notes
1987	China Girl	Carlo Forza	
1988	Moving	Perry	
1988	Short Circuit 2	'Spooky'	
1988	Ich und Er	Tony	
1989	Rooftops	'Blade'	
1989	True Blood	Luis	
1989	Renegades	Skinhead	
1989	Penn & Teller Get Killed	1st Mugger	
1990	Hard to Kill	Punk	
1990	King of New York	Italian Guard	
1991	Out for Justice	Bochi	
1994	Jimmy Hollywood	ATM Robber	
1994	Léon: The Professional	Client #1	
1994	Blood Run	'Spike'	TV movie
1994	Drop Zone	'Deputy Dog'	
1995	Waterworld	'Smitty'	
1995	Last Man Standing	Kazz	
1995	National Lampoon's Favorite Deadly Sins	Robber #2	TV movie
1996	Livers Ain't Cheap	Eric Fidel	
1996	One Tough Bastard	Tattoist	
1996	Tiger Heart	Paulo	
1997	Nightwatch	Pub Thug	
1997	Double Tap	Agent Rodriguez	
1997	Under Oath	Angelo Castillo	
1997	Gang Related	DEA Agent Sarkasian	
1998	Love Kills	Diesel	
1998	Carnival of Souls	Candyman	
1998	Crossfire	Leo	
1998	Strangeland	Matt Myers	
1998	Running Woman	Manuel	
1999	Wishmaster 2: Evil Never Dies	Gries	Video
1999	In Too Deep	Felipe Batista	
1999	Blue Streak	Twitchy Suspect	
2000	Mercy Streets	TJ	
2001	Bubble Boy	Skinny Biker	
2002	Pandemonium	Rico	Video
2002	Four Faces of God	Tony	Short
2003	In Hell	Usup	
2004	Latin Dragon	Paco	
2005	Dirty	Roland	
2007	Half Past Dead 2	Rivera	Video
2007	Never Down]	Rico	
2008	Death Race	Hector 'The Grim Reaper' Grimm	
2008	Autopsy	Scott	
2008	Tortured	Mo	Video
2010	The Wrath of Cain	Redfoot	
2011	Poolboy: Drowning Out the Fury	Spider	
2011	Double Tap	First Team	
2012	Junkie	Nicky	
2012	Tomorrow You're Gone	Ornay Corale	
2014	A Certain Justice	Magico	
2015	Jurassic City	Corporal Ignacio	
2015	Parlor	'The Artist'	
2015	The Human Centipede 3 (Final Sequence)	Inmate #297	
2016	Everlasting	Rocky	
2016	Time	Coach	Short
2016	Nightblade	Julio	
2016	Calico Skies	Macarena	
2017	Secrets of Deception	Jose	
2017	Henri: For the Sake of Love and Justice	Sheriff Duncan	
2017	Psych: The Movie	'El Proveedor'	TV movie
2017	Blood Circus	Deke	
2017	Jason's Letter	Hector	
2018	Cynthia	Pete	
2018	Silencer	Lazarus	
2018	Almost Home	Juan-Carlo	
2018	The Mule	Emilio	
2019	Riviera	David	Short
2019	Lake of Shadows	Cruz Lopez	
2020	Sky Sharks	Father Rodriguez	
2020	Attack of the Unknown	Hades	
2020	Home Stay	Diego Forza	
2020	Hope for the Holidays	Mouse Sanchez	
2020	Steele Justice	Hitman	
2021	14 Ghosts	Barin Daniels	
2021	The Shipment	Spyder	
2021	American Desert	Mike	
2021	The Pizza Joint	Shorty	
2021	Mind Games	Bruce	
2022	Damon's Revenge	Victor	
2022	When George Got Murdered	Derek Chauvin (voice)	
2022	Da First	Huncho	
2022	Project Skyquake	Scott	
2022	Numbers	#6 Jose Mendez	
2022	Of the Devil	Surgeon	
2022	Free Dead or Alive	Jose	
2022	Section Eight	Fresh	
2022	Bridge of the Doomed	General Vasquez	
2022	Tommyknockers	Lucky	
2022	Amber Road	Hades	
2022	Bleach	El Jefe	
2022	The Squad: Rise of the Chicano Squad	The Scientist	
2022	An Awful Thing Has Gone and Happened	Ramsey	
2023	Johnny & Clyde	Candlestick	
2023	Blood Harvest	Jeremiah	
2023	The Legend of Jack and Diane	Cesar	
2023	MobKing	Julio García	
2023	Old Man Jackson	Officer Romero	
2023	Buckle Up	Edgar	
2023	Maze of Fate	Tony	
2023	Bloodthirst	Vampire Master	
2023	Woods Witch	Conrad	
2024	Baba Yaga	Edgar	
2024	Jason Voorhees: Origins	Mars Griffin	Video
2024	Camp Pleasant Lake	Angel	
2024	The Donor	Pancho	Short
2024	Arena Wars	Perez	
2024	Sleepy	Smiley	
2024	American Trash	Milles	
2024	Love Me Dead	Gregg	
2024	Desert Fiends	Romero	
2024	Sunlight	Roddy	
2024	Hostage	Arooka	
2025	Mundije	CIA Agent	
2025	Final Days: Tales from the End Times	LaRouche	
2025	Hollywood Grit	Navarro	
2025	The Final Frame	The Professor	
2025	Clown Motel: 3 Ways to Hell	El Jefe	
2025	A Gunfighter's Deal	Clay Hood	
2025	Vanished	Mickey	

=== Television ===
Year	Title	Role	Notes
1989–90	China Beach	Cpl. Jesus 'Answer Man' Zappara	Recurring Cast: Season 3
1991	Law & Order	Garage Attendant	Episode: "Renunciation"
1993	Harry and the Hendersons	Sol	Episode: "Them Bones"
1993	Dream On	Tattoo Artist	Episode: "Portrait by the Artist on the Young Man"
1993	NYPD Blue	Luis Hernandez	Recurring Cast: Season 1
1994	Renegade	Scott Zane	Episode: "Murderer's Row: Part 1 & 2"
1995	Renegade	Felipe	Episode: "Most Wanted"
1996	High Tide	Jake	Episode: "Code Name: Scorpion"
1996	Pacific Blue	Adam Beckwith	Episode: "Pilot"
1996	Nash Bridges	Baby Boy Doe	Episode: "Skirt Chasers"
1997	The Sentinel	Muscle Guy	Episode: "Blind Man's Bluff"
1997	Renegade	Víctor	Episode: "The Maltese Indian"
1997	Murder One	Osvaldo Cesarus	Recurring Cast: Season 2
1997	Murder One: Diary of a Serial Killer	Osvaldo Cesarus	Main Cast
1998	L.A. Doctors	Torres	Episode: "Fear of Flying"
1999	NYPD Blue	Freddie Ascención	Episode: "Show & Tell"
1999	Martial Law	Héctor Flores	Recurring Cast: Season 1
1999	V.I.P.	Car Mechanic	Episode: "Valma and Louise"
2000	The X-Files	'Cissy' Alvarez	Episode: "The Amazing Maleeni"
2000	Pacific Blue	Adam Beckwith	Episode: "Kidnapped"
2000	Nash Bridges	Doyle	Episode: "Jackpot: Part 1"
2000	18 Wheels of Justice	Ray Murphy	Episode: "The Road to Hell"
2000	V.I.P.	New World Order Leader	Episode: "V.I.P., R.I.P."
2001	The Lone Gunmen	Lowry	Episode: "Maximum Byers"
2001	18 Wheels of Justice	Sammy	Episode: "The Interrogation"
2001	Dead Last	Sanchez Ramirez	Episode: "The Problem with Corruption"
2001	UC: Undercover	-	Episode: "The Siege"
2001	Philly	Diego Flores	Episode: "Fork You Very Much"
2001	NYPD Blue	Kiki	Episode: "Johnny Got His Gold"
2002	V.I.P.	Prison Inmate	Episode: "True Val Story"
2002	The Shield	Joe 'Jo-Jo' Rizal	Episode: "Two Days of Blood"
2002	Fastlane	Owen 'Shadow' Little	Episode: "Things Done Changed"
2003	Touched by an Angel	Lionel	Episode: "As It Is in Heaven"
2003	Boomtown	Pope	Episode: "Execution"
2003	NYPD Blue	Hector Acevedo	Episode: "Shear Stupidity"
2003–10	Nip/Tuck	Escobar Gallardo	Recurring Cast: Season 1, 4; Guest: Season 2, 6
2004	Cold Case	Jesús Torres	Episode: "Hubris"
2005	Judging Amy	Gary Helms	Episode: "Happy Birthday"
2005	Eyes	Santo	Episode: "Shots"
2005	Blind Justice	Johnny Currea	Episode: "Doggone"
2005	Wanted	Silvio Machado	Episode: "Pilot"
2005	Sex, Love & Secrets	Arturo	Recurring Cast
2005	Ghost Whisperer	Julian Borgia	Recurring Cast: Season 1
2005–07	General Hospital	Manny Ruiz/Mateo Ruiz	Regular Cast
2006	Bones	Miguel Villeda	Episode: "The Woman in the Garden"
2006	Mind of Mencia	Paulie	Episode: "The Serranos"
2006–11	CSI: Miami	Memmo Fierro	Recurring Cast: Season 4 & 9, Guest: Season 10
2007	Shark	Hector Hernandez	Episode: "For Whom the Skel Rolls"
2007	Life	Buscando Maldito	Episode: "Let Her Go"
2008	CSI: Crime Scene Investigation	Emilio Alvarado	Episode: "Grissom's Divine Comedy"
2008	The Cleaner	Jack	Episode: "Here Comes the Boom"
2010	Chase	Eduardo 'El Lobo' Lopez	Episode: "Repo"
2011	Criminal Minds: Suspect Behavior	Thomas Luca	Episode: "Strays"
2011	Femme Fatales	Laz Swan	Episode: "Bad Medicine"
2011–12	In Plain Sight	Carlos Ramirez	Guest Cast: Season 4-5
2013	Bad Samaritans	Doug	Main Cast
2013	Back in the Game	Blade	Episode: "Stay In or Bail Out"
2020	Dave	Don Quixote	Episode: "Jail"
2023–24	The Horrorverse	Mars Griffin	Recurring Cast
2026	Zombie Me	Blake Harrison	Recurring cast; online series

== Books by LaSardo ==
- 2014 Life Sentence: A true story about love, lunacy and fame, CreateSpace Independent Publishing Platform, ISBN 978-1496125354
- 2015 Playing With Fire, Glover Lane Press, ISBN 978-0615506920
- 2017 Gabriel's Trial, CreateSpace Independent Publishing Platform, ISBN 978-0615506920
