= Calico Skies (film) =

2016 American thriller drama film by Valerio Esposito

- Directed by: Valerio Esposito
- Written by: Valerio Esposito
- Produced by: Valerio Esposito; Cristina Fanti
- Starring: Tom Sizemore; Christina Bennett Lind; Vincent Pastore; Kiowa Gordon; Charlotte De Bruyne; Robert LaSardo
- Cinematography: Martim Vian
- Edited by: Federico Conforti
- Music by: Alberto Bof
- Production company: Hot Tub Films
- Distributed by: Freestyle Releasing
- Release dates: November 13, 2016 (Mannheim-Heidelberg International Film Festival); August 15, 2018 (VOD)
- Running time: 89 minutes
- Countries: United States; Italy
- Language: English

Calico Skies is a 2016 American thriller drama film directed by Valerio Esposito, starring Tom Sizemore, Christina Bennett Lind, Vincent Pastore, Kiowa Gordon, Charlotte De Bruyne and Robert LaSardo.

== Cast ==
- Tom Sizemore as Phoenix
- Christina Bennett Lind as Ariel
- Vincent Pastore as Vincenzo
- Kiowa Gordon as Bamboo
- Charlotte De Bruyne as Charlotte
- Robert LaSardo as Macarena
- Luigi Iacuzio as Luigi

== Reception ==
Paul Parcellin of Film Threat gave the film a score of 7 out of 10 and wrote that while "Sizemore inhabits his role as a loner so deftly that most of his interactions with secondary characters feel under-written and are less engaging than his solo time on screen", the "struggles, humanity and neurotic tendencies of his infectious character keep this strange tale of regret and doomed hope for salvation alive in the darkness of the desert’s blazing sunlight."

Peter Martin of ScreenAnarchy wrote that while it is "worthwhile" to "watch Tom Sizemore in a lead role", his character "ultimately becomes frustrating as the central character because none of the few other characters rise up to balance his inaction with any meaningful responses until very late in the narrative."
