= Judie Aronson =

American actress

- Born: June 1964 (age 61); Los Angeles, California, U.S.
- Education: Grant High School
- Occupations: Actress, entrepreneur, pilates studio owner
- Years active: 1983–present

Judith Aronson (born in June 1964) is an American actress who has appeared in many films and television shows.

== Career ==
Born in June 1964, and raised in Los Angeles, Aronson is one of five daughters born to Diane Fern (née Weinberg) and Hillel Samuel Aronson. She is also the granddaughter of Russian-born Rabbi David Aronson, former President of the Rabbinical Assembly of America and author, in 1945, of The Jewish Way of Life. She attended Grant High School.

Aronson's first film role was in the 1984 horror film Friday the 13th: The Final Chapter as Samantha. In 1985, she appeared in the hit comedy movie Weird Science as Hilly and in the action movie American Ninja. She briefly retired from acting in film and television after the 2005 film Kiss Kiss Bang Bang before returning in 2013 to appear in the documentary Crystal Lake Memories: The Complete History of Friday the 13th.

Aronson played Sara Duncan on the short-lived series Pursuit of Happiness (1987–88). She has also made numerous guest appearances on such television shows as Sledge Hammer!, The Powers of Matthew Star, Simon & Simon, Midnight Caller, Full House, Beverly Hills, 90210, Las Vegas, Charles in Charge and Law & Order: Criminal Intent. She made an appearance in the 1990 music video, "(Can't Live Without Your) Love and Affection", by Nelson.

In addition to her acting career, Aronson is also an entrepreneur. She owned a Curio Shoppe and currently runs Pilates studios in the Los Angeles area.

== Filmography ==
=== Film ===
Year	Title	Role	Notes
1984	Friday the 13th: The Final Chapter	Samantha Lane	
1985	Weird Science	Hilly	
1985	American Ninja	Patricia Hickock	
1988	One Fine Night	Bonnie	Short
1989	After Midnight	Jennifer	Segment: "A Night on the Town"
1990	The Sleeping Car	Kim	
1990	Cool Blue	Cathy	
1992	Desert Kickboxer	Claudia Valenti	
2000	Lisa Picard Is Famous	Liz	
2000	Deep Core	Lilly	
2001	Hannibal	News Reporter	
2005	Kiss Kiss Bang Bang	Gift Bag Girl	
2006	We Fight to Be Free	Emily Chamberlayne	Short
2016	The Secret of 40	Marie	Short
2021	13 Fanboy	Herself	

=== Television ===
Year	Title	Role	Notes
1983	The Powers of Matthew Star	Lisa Wellman	Episode: "Dead Man's Hand"
1983	Simon & Simon	Ronda	2 episodes
1984	Things Are Looking Up	Randi White	TV film
1986	Sledge Hammer!	Francine Flambo	Episode: "Under the Gun"
1986	Dads	Shana	Episode: "The Thing on Allan's Nose"
1987	Mr. Belvedere	Linda	Episode: "The Mogul"
1987	Full House	Raven	Episode: "Our Very First Night"
1987–1988	Pursuit of Happiness	Sara Duncan	Main role (10 episodes)
1989	The New Leave It to Beaver	Jennifer	Episode: "Road Trip"
1989	Charles in Charge	Luanne	Episode: "Poetic License"
1989	Sister Kate	Brenda	Episode: "April in Paris"
1990	Growing Pains	Cindy	Episode: "The Return of the Triangle"
1991	Midnight Caller	Cassie Douglas	2 episodes
1991	Life Goes On	Phoebe	Episode: "Sweet 16"
1991	Teech	Gina	Episode: "Pizza My Heart"
1991–1998	Beverly Hills, 90210	Shelly	3 episodes
1993	Roc	Nancy	Episode: "Ebony and Ivory"
1996	Silk Stalkings	Medical Examiner	Episode: "Playing Doctor"
1996	Simon	Jackie	Episode: "Simon Goes to the Dogs"
1996	Night Stand with Dick Dietrick	Maggie	Episode: "UFO Mother Show"
1997	High Tide	Courteney Robbins	2 episodes
2001	100 Centre Street	Ms. Seidenman	Episode: "And Justice for Some"
2001	Law & Order: Criminal Intent	Valerie Kelmer	Episode: "The Good Doctor"
2004	Las Vegas	Cheryl Bullock	Episode: "Montecito Lancers"
2009	His Name Was Jason: 30 Years of Friday the 13th	Herself	Documentary film
