= Sara Fabel =

Finnish artist

- Born: 14 October 1986 (age 40); Espoo, Finland
- Occupations: Actress, Model, Illustrator, Tattoo artist
- Website: www.sarafabel.com

Sara Fabel (born Sari Katriina Virtanen) is a Finnish model, illustrator, tattoo artist, and actress.

== Early life ==
Fabel grew up in Helsinki, Finland and studied art education at Aalto University (then known as Helsinki University of Art and Design). As part of her studies, she joined an exchange program with Griffith University in Brisbane, Australia. She covered photography and animation during her exchange year. After returning to Finland, Fabel taught part-time and freelanced as an illustrator and model. In 2006 Fabel began working as a traveling artist.

== Career ==
Fabel began promoting her artwork and modeling through social media platforms such as Facebook, Tumblr and Instagram. By the end of 2010, she had developed a fan base around her art and modelling. Fabel started traveling, creating contacts with international photographers and artists and becoming involved in artist collaborations and campaigns. In 2013, after moving to the United States, Sara Fabel retired from modeling and took a lead role in the film Anarchy Parlor. From 2013 onwards, Fabel has been focusing on her art.

=== Film ===
- 2013 Fabel was cast in the horror film Anarchy Parlor as Uta, the tattoo artist's apprentice.

=== Publications ===
Sara Fabel has been featured in multiple international publications, the majority based in Australia and the United States.

While residing in New Zealand, Fabel collaborated with local and international artists and photographers. One of these collaborations was T.J. Scott's In the Tub art book. Fabel's career developed as she was frequently published in tattoo industry publications such as Front, Issue 154, 2011 Picture top 50 hottest tattooed females, Inked, Tattoos Downunder, Custom Tattooz, Tattoo Society and a double cover collectors' edition of Bound by Ink.

Fabel has also had multiple features in fashion, street art and fine art publications including Acclaim, Diesel – Only the brave, Culture magazine (Australia), Me Naiset (Finland), Reykjavik Boulevard (Iceland) and Sinical (International).

=== Charity work ===
Sara Fabel has been active in fundraising for cancer awareness with T.J. Scott In the Tub projects, as well as working with Peter Coulson, an Australian fine art photographer. Coulson's book In My Pants the Book received Australian government funding towards cancer awareness.

Sara Fabel has used her social media following to promote awareness of domestic animal abuse issues such as declawing. In 2015 Fabel was selected as the face of More Than a Cone, a fundraising project for animal shelters.

==== Associated artists ====
- Kevin Llewellyn Modelling collaboration featured in Kat Von D's Wonderland gallery.
- Mike Giant

== Hell has NO fury ==
Hell has NO fury is Sara Fabel's brand (Clothing, art) that promotes self-awareness along with Atheistic and Agnostic belief system.
