= The Princess Academy =

- Directed by: Bruce A. Block
- Written by: Sandra Weintraub
- Story by: Fred Weintraub
- Produced by: Sandra Weintraub
- Starring: Lar Park-Lincoln; Lu Leonard; Eva Gabor
- Cinematography: Kent L. Wakeford
- Edited by: Martin Cohen
- Music by: Roger Bellon
- Distributed by: Empire Pictures; Lightning Video
- Release date: April 1987
- Running time: 90 minutes
- Countries: France; United States; Yugoslavia
- Language: English

The Princess Academy is a 1987 independent film comedy directed by Bruce A. Block and written by Sandra Weintraub. It was filmed entirely in Yugoslavia near Zagreb and at Yadran Studios.

== Plot ==
Cindy Cathcart (Lar Park-Lincoln) is a student out of place at an exclusive Swiss finishing school, Von Pupsin Academy. A poor orphan, Cindy is attending on a scholarship, and is resented by her snobby peers as well as Fraulein Stinkenschmidt (Lu Leonard). She soon finds allies: her British roommate, an outgoing Texan, Lulu Belle (Britt Helfer), an Italian Mafiosi's daughter, Isabella (Barbara Rousek), and most crucial, the school's headmistress, Countess Von Pupsin (Eva Gabor).

== Cast ==
- Lar Park-Lincoln as Cindy Cathcart
- Eva Gabor as Countess Von Pupsin
- Lu Leonard as Fraulein Stinkenschmidt
- Richard Paul as Drago
- Carole Davis as Sonia
- Bader Howar as Sarah
- Barbara Rousek as Isabella "Izzie"
- Britt Helfer as Lulu Belle
- Nathalie Tarkowski as Colette
- Shelley Pielou as Hillary Haverstock
- Yolande Palfrey as Pamela Lenox
- Robin Lermitte as Alexander "Alex" Snivelroe
- Eric Viellard as Pierre
- Igor Serdar as Sonny
- Jeremy Booker as William "Willy" Cavendish
- Kader Boukhanef as Samir

== Release ==
The film was given a theatrical release in April 1987. After its theatrical run, the film was released on videocassette by Lightning Video. The film has yet to be released on DVD or Blu-ray.
