= Medicine Ball (TV series) =

American medical drama television series

- Genre: Medical drama
- Created by: Kerry Lenhart; John J. Sakmar
- Starring: Jensen Daggett; Darryl Fong; Sam McMurray; Harrison Pruett; Jeffrey D. Sams
- Country of origin: United States
- Original language: English
- No. of seasons: 1
- No. of episodes: 9

Production
- Running time: 60 minutes
- Production companies: Lakeside Productions; Crystal Beach Entertainment; Warner Bros. Television

Original release
- Network: Fox
- Release: March 13 – May 15, 1995

Medicine Ball is an American medical drama television series that aired from March 13 until May 15, 1995 on Fox.

== Premise ==
Medical drama set at a hospital in Seattle where a group of young doctors are about to begin their residencies.

== Cast ==
- Jensen Daggett as Katie Cooper
- Harrison Pruett as Harley Spencer
- Donal Logue as Danny Macklin
- Kai Soremekun as Nia James
- Darryl Fong as Max Chang
- Jeffrey D. Sams as Clate Baker
- Vincent Ventresca as Tom Powell
- Timothy Omundson as Patrick Yeats
- Sam McMurray as Douglas McGill

== Episodes ==
No.	Title	Directed by	Written by	Original release date
1	"Pilot"	Unknown	Unknown	March 13, 1995
On her first day on the job, Katie clashes with her supervisor. Danny loses his first patient. Harley Spencer tries to correct the misdiagnosis of an older doctor.
2	"Wizard of Bras"	Unknown	Unknown	March 20, 1995
A patient suggests an alternative treatment. Tom and Danny do volunteer work at a college.
3	"Life's Ebola Cherries"	Unknown	Unknown	April 3, 1995
Harley and a patient are trapped in a sealed room because of a deadly virus they may have contracted. Max wins a day with baseball player Ken Griffey Jr.
4	"Heart and Sole"	Unknown	Unknown	April 10, 1995
A transplant is postponed because of a donor who isn't who they thought he was. A dwarf wants nothing to do with the birth of his son, because he will grow to full size.
5	"Smoke Gets in Your Thighs"	Unknown	Unknown	April 17, 1995
Elizabeth gets in an auto accident. A patient believes Patrick is Jesus Christ.
6	"Sex, Lies and Adhesive Tape"	Unknown	Unknown	April 24, 1995
Clate and Harley have trouble arranging a heart transplant. Max has to deal with the death of Elizabeth.
7	"Hot Lips and Major Burns"	Unknown	Unknown	May 1, 1995
The doctors have to treat two burn victims. A widow demands an apology after Danny doesn't tell her immediately about the death of her spouse.
8	"Blind Man's Bluff"	Unknown	Unknown	May 8, 1995
A blind man has surgery to restore his vision, but the doctors learn that he may lose his sight again. Nia wants clate to cancel a date with a patient.
9	"Night of the I Wanna"	Unknown	Unknown	May 15, 1995
Clate's sister wants her son back. A surgeon is injured in a train wreck.

== Court case ==
A dispute over the actor's union contract on the show led to the U.S. Supreme Court Case, Marquez v. Screen Actors Guild Inc.
