= ProStars =

American animated television series

- "ProStars, it's all about helping kids".
- Genre: Animation
- Created by: Andy Heyward; Douglas Booth
- Developed by: Rob Humphrey; Jim Peterson
- Written by: Douglas Booth
- Starring: Michael Jordan; Bo Jackson; Wayne Gretzky
- Voices of: Dorian Harewood; Dave Fennoy; Townsend Coleman; Susan Silo; Diana Barrows
- Composer: Eric Allaman
- Countries of origin: United States; Italy
- Original language: English
- No. of seasons: 1
- No. of episodes: 13

Production
- Executive producer: Andy Heyward
- Producer: Kevin O'Donnell
- Running time: 22 minutes
- Production companies: DIC Animation City; Reteitalia S.p.A.

Original release
- Network: NBC (U.S.); Telecinco (Spain)
- Release: September 14 – December 7, 1991

ProStars is an animated series that aired on NBC from September 14 to December 7, 1991. Three professional athletes from that era appear in the show in live action and as fictional superhero characters: Michael Jordan, Bo Jackson, and Wayne Gretzky.

The series was produced by DIC Animation City and Reteitalia, S.p.A., in association with Spanish network Telecinco.

== Overview ==
=== Synopsis ===
Originally intended to air on ESPN, the show centers on Michael Jordan, Bo Jackson and Wayne Gretzky fighting crime, helping children, and often protecting the environment as well. These three were chosen to represent the pinnacle of all four major American professional sports in the early 1990s. While Jordan and Gretzky are broadly associated with their respective sports, Jackson was included since he could represent both football and baseball and was a high-profile celebrity off the field as well. A reference to his "Bo Knows" Nike ad-campaign was worked into almost every episode.

=== Live-action sequences ===
The stars appear in live-action sequences before the show, in which they would tell kids about the upcoming episode, and often answer questions from kids at the conclusion. Normally this is done solely by Gretzky and Jackson, often in separate sound stages and edited to appear as if talking to each other. Jordan's filmed bits were almost always one line or two, and not part of the skits before the episode. Most of the live-action parts by the athletes dealt with things such as morality. In one episode they explained about ghosts, stating that even they get scared sometimes, and that fear is a normal human emotion. In an episode with robot athletes, they explained how such an idea will never come to reality, as it goes against the dedication men put into their sport. During the animated segments of ProStars, their animated counterparts were voiced by voice actors instead of their actual selves.

=== Theme music ===
When the show first came out, the original theme song, "We Are ProStars", was an homage to the song "We Will Rock You", by the rock group, Queen. In later episodes, the song was slowed down, and the chorus was reduced to "ProStars! Show staaaars!" The lyrics also reference the "Bo Knows" ad campaign, including the line "Bo knows everything".

== Characters ==
Each character on ProStars has one stand-out character trait, especially the ProStars themselves:

- Michael Jordan (voiced by Dorian Harewood) is the leader of the troupe. He is exceptionally smart and talented with complicated contraptions, and he encourages children to study mathematics and the sciences.
- Bo Jackson (voiced by Dave Fennoy) provides the proverbial "muscle" for the heroes. He is immensely strong, and has a bit of a mean streak. His strength often approaches superhuman levels, such as in the series opening, when he uses a gigantic tree trunk like a club against a logging robot.
- Wayne Gretzky (voiced by Townsend Coleman) is often focused on food, and is often the comic relief, but at certain times he shows a serious side, such as when the Stanley Cup was stolen, as it was something he had earned.
- Mom (voiced by Susan Silo) is a quasi-Yiddish and Jewish mother stereotype, and is the Q to the ProStars' James Bond. She constantly invents wacky gadgets loosely based on sports equipment for the heroes to use. The ProStars spend all their free time in Mom's Gym, and possibly live there as well, also serving as the ProStars' "headquarters".
- Denise (voiced by Diana Barrows) is an attractive young apprentice to Mom. She wants to "help" the ProStars, yet she rarely makes an impact. She is kind of a groupie.
- The Neighbor is a hapless African-American man who wears glasses and happens to live in the same neighborhood as the ProStars' headquarters. By sheer misfortune, he happens to fall victim to the malfunctions of the ProStars' machines, such as when he is buried in snow after their climate machine goes awry. In another episode, he takes a vacation to the Himalayas, and he enjoys the isolation and confidence that he is far away from any mishaps the ProStars could unleash, only to find the ProStars are also in the area stopping a villain there.

=== Villains ===
In nearly every episode the ProStars would get a message by teleconference from a child explaining the situation such as a little boy from an island in the South Seas who said his village's treasures were being stolen by Short John Silver.

Most of the villains were standard cartoon fare and had often done villainous acts akin to cartoons of the early 1990s (such as Captain Planet and Free Willy), namely environmental irresponsibility such as strip mining, coastal pollution, or deforestation of the rainforest.

Other times, a villain might hold a child for ransom, such as a mad scientist named Dr. Lobe who demanded the ProStars play his line of robot athletes in order to release a little girl he kidnapped. Episodes also touched upon kids in gangs, where an Australian village is being held captive by Gargantus' motorcycle gang and a little girl's brother joins the gang thinking they are macho to which Michael Jordan tells the little girl she cannot stop loving or having faith in her brother. One episode dealt with the larceny of the Stanley Cup committed by Clockwork Delaronge (which is a personal issue for Wayne Gretzky as his name is carved on it four times) and he tells kids of the history and prestige of the award.

== Voice cast ==
- Dorian Harewood - Michael Jordan
- Dave Fennoy - Bo Jackson
- Townsend Coleman - Wayne Gretzky
- Susan Silo - Mom
- Diana Barrows - Denise

=== Additional voices ===
- Charlie Adler - Froggy (ep. 8)
- Marv Albert - Himself (eps. 1, 9, and 12)
- Jack Angel -
- Bill Callaway -
- Brian Cummings - Doug (ep. 10)
- Jim Cummings - Short John Sliver (ep. 2)
- Debi Derryberry -
- Pat Fraley - Buster (ep. 5)
- Mike Fratello - Himself (Ep. 12)
- Ben Ryan Ganger -
- Ellen Gerstell -
- Dan Gilvezan -
- Edan Gross -
- Whitby Hertford -
- Dana Hill - Keith (ep. 8)
- Jerry Houser -
- Robert Ito - Emperor (ep. 8)
- Richard Karron -
- Art Kimbro -
- David Lander -
- Katie Leigh -
- Sherry Lynn -
- Tress MacNeille - Carlotta (ep. 4), Ice Mancuso (ep. 5)
- Candi Milo -
- Robert Morse -
- Rob Paulsen - Captain Nemo Ipanema (Ep. 6)
- Hal Rayle -
- Neil Ross -
- Ron Rubin - Clockwork Delorange (ep. 1)
- Justin Shenkarow - Tommy (Ep. 10)
- R. J. Williams - Jimmy Hanks (Ep. 1), Concession Salesperson (Ep. 3)

== Crew ==
- Marsha Goodman - casting director
- Ginny McSwain - voice director
- Cary Silver - talent coordinator

== Episodes ==
1. "The Slugger Returns" - The ProStars come to the aid of Jimmy Hanks when his father "Slugger" Hanks is captured by a mad scientist named Clockwork Delaronge who is using remote-controlled robots including one of dead baseball star Cleets Robinson as part of a plot to capture the Commissioner of Baseball.
2. "Short John's Revenge" - A pirate supervillain named Short John Sliver sails into an idyllic Caribbean Island, imprisons the inhabitants, and steals the ancient pirate treasure they had discovered.
3. "The Perbots of Dr. Lobe" - A mad scientist named Dr. Lobe proposes a competition to the ProStars to compete against his Perbots for the fate of a girl named Jill.
4. "Knightmare Riders" - The ProStars travel to Scotland to save a community from the Ghost Riders of Sir Vitus. This is a cover-up by the evil Carlotta to drive away the golfers so that she can excavate the Golden Throne of Sir Vitus.
5. "Valley of the Snow Falcon" - Ice Mancuso, an unscrupulous real estate developer, intends to excavate diamonds at a sacred kingdom in the Himalayas. With the help of a young princess and a mysterious Snow Falcon, the ProStars jump into action to save the kingdom.
6. "Brazil Nuts" - Captain Nemo Ipanema is destroying the Brazilian rainforest as a side to his mining operation designed to secure the world's supply of Amazonite for his own egomaniacal use.
7. "Block Busters" - Paulie Sludger, a corrupt businessman, frightens a block center population with the intent of purchasing the neighborhood for his toxic waste dumping operation.
8. "Gargantus and the Highway of Doom" - A girl named Sheila calls the ProStars to Australia when Gargantus and his motorcycle gang are terrorizing an Australian village and forcing the inhabitants to build his castle. The worst part of it is that her brother Keith has joined up with Gargantus.
9. "Rustler's Rodeo" - Dusty Boots intends to win the prize money for a rodeo contest and pay off the debt owed by his family so that he can buy back the family ranch, but a gangster named Rattlesnake Rick, who intends to buy out the ranch for himself for its oil adjacent reserves has complicated matters by kidnapping Dusty's horse.
10. "Roll to Victory" - When a local basketball charity is at risk of being closed down due to cheap shot tactics by the Pontiac Hoods led by Doug, it is up to the ProStars to stop them.
11. "A Bite of the Big Apple" - Rob's stepsister Jenny has run away to New York City. The Prostars find her easily, but convincing her to come back home is the hard part. Things go particularly awry when Jenny and her friend Tracy get mixed up with a gang of pickpockets led by The King.
12. "Clockwork Catastrophe" - Clockwork Delaronge has returned. This time, he has stolen the famous Stanley Cup. To make matters even worse, Delaronge has also kidnapped Mom. It is up to the ProStars to skate into action and get them both back.
13. "The Final Cut" - In this clip episode, Mom challenges the ProStars on their efficiency, prompting them to prove her wrong by showing her their past adventures.

== Home media ==
DIC Video originally released three single VHS tapes of the series in 1991 containing the episodes "Knightmare Riders", "Short John's Revenge" and "The Slugger's Return". In the same year, BMG Kidz, through the DIC Toon-Time Video series, released three single VHS tapes with the episodes "Roll to Victory", "The Perbots of Dr. Lobe" and "The Valley of the Snow Falcon".

In October 2003, Sterling Entertainment Group released a DVD called "Slam Dunkin' with the Airman", containing the episodes "Gargantus and the Highway of Doom", "Knightmare Riders" and "Roll to Victory". This DVD was reissued by NCircle Entertainment in 2007. These sets went out of print in 2012.

As of today, NCircle has yet to release the complete series or even release the episodes separate on DVD or digital for reasons beyond WildBrain's control. (Note: Michael Jordan, Bo Jackson, and Wayne Gretzky are trademarked by themselves. Sports footage is owned by the National Basketball Association, Major League Baseball, and National Hockey League.)
