= Debi Sue Voorhees =

American actress (born 1961)

Deborah Voorhees
- Born: Deborah Sue Voorhees; July 28, 1961 (age 65); Amarillo, Texas, U.S.
- Other names: Debi Sue Voorhees; Deborah Voorhees
- Occupations: Actress; film director; writer
- Height: 5 ft 6 in (1.68 m)
- Website: deborahvoorhees1961.blogspot.com

Deborah Sue Voorhees (born July 28, 1961) is an American director, actress and writer. She is best known for her role as Tina in the 1985 movie Friday the 13th: A New Beginning. Voorhees directed and portrays a fictionalized version of herself in the horror film 13 Fanboy.

== Biography ==
Voorhees was born July 28, 1961, in Amarillo, Texas. Prior to acting she was a Playboy Bunny at the Dallas Playboy Club from 1980 to 1982. It was through this job that she attracted the attention of Playboy magazine. Voorhees attended the 50th anniversary reunion of the Playboy Club in 2011.

From 1982 until 1986 she had several minor roles in movies and television series which included a seven episode role on the show Dallas from 1982 until 1985.

Sharing the same last name as the main antagonist of the series, Jason Voorhees, helped her get an audition for the Friday the 13th Part 5: A New Beginning horror film. She has said of being involved with the Friday the 13th movie series: "I look back on Friday the 13th with fondness....it is kind of neat that so many people do really enjoy them (the film series)."

She has also appeared in the 2009 documentary His Name Was Jason: 30 Years of Friday the 13th and the 2013 documentary Crystal Lake Memories: The Complete History of Friday the 13th.

She is also a writer and has worked for The Dallas Morning News and others over her fifteen+ year career. She has written a novel, Memoirs Of A Hit Man, and composed a comic memoir titled Diary of a Mad School Teacher.

In 2012 Voorhees wrote, directed, and appeared in the independent comedy film Billy Shakespeare, this was Voorhees' writing and directorial debut. The film was produced by her production company Voorhees Films. Voorhees directed and portrays a fictionalized version of herself in the horror film 13 Fanboy.

== Filmography ==
=== Film ===
- Innocent Prey (1984) – Hooker
- Avenging Angel (1985) – Roxie
- Friday the 13th: A New Beginning (1985) – Tina
- Appointment with Fear (1985) – Ruth
- Crystal Lake Memories: The Complete History of Friday the 13th (2013) - Herself (documentary film)
- Billy Shakespeare (2014) – Witch II
- 13 Fanboy (2021) - Herself

=== Television ===
- Dallas, in various episodes (1982-1985) – Caroline / Waitress
- Riptide, in the episode "A Matter of Policy" (1986) – Tippy
- His Name Was Jason: 30 Years of Friday the 13th (2009) - Herself (documentary film)

=== Web ===
- Friday the 13th: Camp Crystal Legacy (2026) – Herself, documentary web series; episode: "Part IV: The Women of Crystal Lake"
