= Sky Sharks =

- Directed by: Marc Fehse
- Written by: Marc Fehse; A.D. Morel; Carsten Fehse
- Starring: Robert LaSardo; Cary-Hiroyuki Tagawa; Lynn Lowry; Lar Park Lincoln; Nick Principe; Michaela Schaffrath; Charles Rettinghaus
- Production company: Capelight Pictures
- Distributed by: Dark Sky Films; MPI Media Group
- Release date: August 2020 (London FrightFest)
- Running time: 102 minutes
- Country: Germany
- Languages: English; German; Spanish; Russian; Japanese; French

Sky Sharks is a 2020 German science fiction comedy horror film directed by Marc Fehse and starring Robert LaSardo, Cary-Hiroyuki Tagawa, Lynn Lowry, Lar Park Lincoln, Nick Principe, Michaela Schaffrath and Charles Rettinghaus.

== Plot ==
During an expedition in Antarctica, a geological team accidentally discovers a Nazi laboratory from World War II that was kept hidden in the depths of the ice. A terrible secret weapon is hidden in the lab: an army of genetically modified sharks piloted by superhuman Nazi zombies. When they are awakened, they take to the skies, with terrible consequences for everything that crosses their path. An elite military group of four fallen US soldiers in Vietnam faces the threat to save the Earth from destruction.

== Cast ==
- Tony Todd as Major General Frost
- Lynn Lowry as Mother Mary
- Mick Garris as Dr. Gage Creed
- Barbara Nedeljáková as Angelique Richter
- Eva Habermann as Diabla Richter
- Cary-Hiroyuki Tagawa as Michael Morel
- Robert LaSardo as Father Rodriguez
- Nick Principe as Hans Leiber
- Lar Park Lincoln as Sidney Scott
- Oliver Kalkofe as Hermann Göring
- Naomi Grossman as Natalie Rochefort
- Dave Sheridan (uncredited) as Kifo Mleta
- Amanda Bearse as Marjorie Phelps
- Yan Birch as Godfrey Graves
- Travis Love as Pierre Colbert
- Désirée Giorgetti as Tracy
- J. Larose as Martin Keele
- Kurando Mitsutake as Dr. Katsube's Interpreter
- Michaela Schaffrath as Heidi Lönz
- Charles Rettinghaus as Stewart Rainer Wein

== Release ==
The film premiered at the London FrightFest Film Festival in August 2020. It was released on DVD, Blu-ray and digital platforms on February 2, 2021.

== Reception ==
The film has a 50% rating on Rotten Tomatoes based on six reviews.

Martin Unsworth of Starburst awarded the film three stars and wrote, "Like the bastard son of Iron Sky and Dead Snow, Sky Sharks has Nazis at its heart, but in a way that allows the audience to have a little fun."
