= Bloodthirst (2023 film) =

Film directed by Michael Su

- Poster
- Directed by: Michael Su
- Screenplay by: Adrian Milnes
- Story by: Massimiliano Cerchi
- Produced by: Sonny Mahal; Michael Mahal
- Starring: Costas Mandylor; Tara Reid; Robert LaSardo
- Cinematography: Michael Su
- Edited by: Lea Vrabelova; Gregory Solis
- Music by: Scott Glasgow
- Production company: Mahal Empire
- Distributed by: Lionsgate Home Entertainment
- Release date: October 31, 2023
- Running time: 88 minutes
- Country: United States
- Language: English

Bloodthirst is a 2023 American independent action horror film directed by Michael Su and written by Adrian Milnes and Massimiliano Cerchi. The film stars Costas Mandylor, Tara Reid and Robert LaSardo.

== Cast ==
- Costas Mandylor as John Shepard
- Tara Reid as Vampire Queen
- Robert LaSardo as Vampire Master
- Tatiana Sokolova as Destias
- Sarah French as Brooke Thompson
- Elissa Dowling as Elena Thompson
- Eileen Dietz as Peggy Sue

== Production ==
Sonny and Michael Mahal of Mahal Empire Productions announced via their Crowdfunding campaign in January 2020, that they were searching to fund their newest vampire thriller Bloodthirst, written by Adrian Milnes and Massimiliano Cerchi. Tara Reid, Robert LaSardo and Costas Mandylor were confirmed in leading roles and Michael Su was hired as director.

== Release ==
The film was announced to be releasing in October 2023.

== Reception ==
Flickering Myth praised the film for its clever use of a small budget, and described the film as being "Mad Max meets From Dusk till Dawn".
