= Parlor (film) =

Parlorza
- Directed by: Devon Downs; Kenny Gage
- Written by: Devon Downs; Kenny Gage
- Produced by: Andrew Pagana; Thomas Mahoney
- Starring: Robert LaSardo; Claire Garvey; Jordan James Smith Sara Fabel
- Cinematography: James
- Edited by: Ralph Jean-Pierre
- Music by: Adrianna Krikl
- Distributed by: Gravitas Ventures
- Release dates: October 14, 2014 (Screamfest Horror Film Festival); June 19, 2015
- Running time: 96 minutes
- Country: United States
- Language: English

Parlor (also known as Anarchy Parlor and Killer Ink) is a 2014 American horror film and the directorial debut of Devon Downs and Kenny Gage, both of whom also wrote the film's script. It had its world premiere on October 14, 2014 at the Screamfest Horror Film Festival and was shot over a 20-day period in Vilnius, Lithuania.

== Plot ==
College friends Amy, Brock, Jesse, Stephanie, Kevin, and Kelly vacation in Vilnius, Lithuania. While exploring a strange club, Amy finds an intriguing series of portraits belonging to the Cuzas family. Brock meets a sexually aggressive tattoo artist’s apprentice named Uta and convinces Amy to accompany him to the parlor so that she can get a tattoo to commemorate her trip.

Uta seduces Brock in the parlor’s basement, which is actually a dungeon, and ultimately takes Brock prisoner. Upstairs, Amy connects with The Artist while discussing meanings behind tattoo art. The Artist then drugs Amy’s drink and takes her prisoner. Restrained on a slab in the dungeon, Amy is forced to watch as The Artist flays Brock’s back and removes his skin for use as a canvas.

The other four friends realize that Brock and Amy are missing the following day and begin searching local tattoo parlors. Jesse assaults a gang of street youths when one of them makes a presumably rude comment. The group finds The Artist’s parlor, but he tells them that Brock and Amy left the night before. Kevin, Stephanie, and Kelly insist on contacting police and continuing their search. Convinced that their friends are fine, Jesse refuses to spend any more time on the endeavor and goes off on his own to a strip club.

Kelly eventually deduces that a tattoo she saw hanging on the parlor’s wall is the same one that was on Brock’s arm. She, Stephanie, and Kevin return to the parlor and are taken prisoner. Because her skin is impure due to a birthmark, The Artist gives Stephanie to Uta to practice flaying. The Artist then instructs Uta to leave Amy unharmed before taking his leave. Uta botches the flaying and kills Stephanie. Kevin is tortured, although his final fate is left in the air.

The Artist arrives at a wealthy benefactor’s mansion and delivers a portrait painted on human skin. Kelly escapes the parlor and runs for help, but ends up chased by the street youths Jesse assaulted earlier. The gang corners Kelly in an alleyway and prepares to attack when The Artist arrives and shoots everybody, including Kelly.

Jesse brings a stripper named Zala to the tattoo parlor. Zala has her clit pierced by Uta and the two women end up fighting until Zala is captured and later tortured.

When Jesse discovers that Amy is The Artist’s captive, he tries to shut down The Artist’s operation. It is revealed that Jesse is part of the Cuzas line and his father insisted that he have a portrait of himself done on human skin as part of their family tradition. Jesse only meant for Brock to be murdered, but not his other friends.

Her brainwashing nearly complete, The Artist releases Amy. Amy kills both Uta and Jesse and takes up a position at The Artist’s side as his new apprentice.

== Cast ==
- Robert LaSardo as 'The Artist'
- Jordan James Smith as Jesse
- Tiffany DeMarco as Amy
- Sara Fabel as Uta
- Ben Whalen as Brock
- Claire Garvey as Kelly
- Anthony Del Negro as Kevin
- Beth Humphreys as Stephanie
- Joey Fisher as Zala
- Gracie Finlan as Amber
- Nik Goldman as Marek
- Gabija Urniežiūtė as Anya

== Release ==
=== Home media ===
The film was released on DVD and Blu-ray by FilmRise on June 1, 2016.

== Reception ==
Parlor received mixed from critics upon its release

Jake Dee joblo.com ANARCHY PARLOR is of a higher quality than you might think at first blush. Perhaps I feel stronger about that than most having enjoyed it more than I should, but really, extending past the cool storyline and curvy plot-turns, the best thing about the film is how it elicits a sense of halcyon horror glory. It feels like an old-school 80s stalk-and-slash/trap-and-torture joint: a fun vibe, unique location, a dearth of clothing, huge boobies, massive bloodshed, an unpredictable finale and a bar-raising villainous turn by a longtime acting vet. I’m not even a tattoo guy, but here’s one PARLOR I can staunchly stand behind..

Frank Scheck from The Hollywood Reporter gave the film a negative review, stating that the film was, "wholly generic, with its one-note characterizations, profanity-laden dialogue and generally amateurish performances relegating it to strictly bargain-basement status". Garry Goldstein of The Los Angeles Times panned the film, criticizing the film's dialogue, lack of tension and character development, uneven pacing, and performances. Moviepilot gave high praise for LaSardo's acting in Parlor and stated that while the film was similar in various ways to other torture porn horror films, that viewers should "Just enjoy it for what it is, which is a gruesome, gory, blackly funny movie that finds perverse glee in taking all the overused cliches of splatter films and turning them upside-down." Ain't It Cool News was more mixed in their review and they remarked that "Robert Lasardo's Artist is a great centerpiece for the film to hang on, and there are moments of both gore and suspense that are clear evidence of Downs and Gage's talent behind the camera. But the tattoo-centric plot and the lame, oversexed dialogue of the teens give the film a sense of "bro-ness" that conflicts with the joys of its no-bullshit scares, and that's a shame, 'cause when they hit, they do tend to leave a mark." Fangoria mostly panned the film, praising LaSardo and Fabel while writing overall "Sure the premise is intriguing, the villains are vile (in a good way!), and the setting is darkly magical… but those they aren’t enough to elevate the poor acting, atrocious dialogue and ugly, nasty violence."
