= Jensen Daggett =

American film and television actress (b. 1969)

- Born: June 24, 1969 (age 57); Connecticut, U.S.
- Occupation: Actress
- Years active: 1989–2011

External image
- Daggett as Maggie Reynolds in Major League: Back to the Minors (1998).

Jensen Daggett (born June 24, 1969) is an American film and television actress. She has appeared in the films Friday the 13th Part VIII: Jason Takes Manhattan (1989) and Major League: Back to the Minors (1998). She had a recurring role as Nancy Taylor in Home Improvement.

== Life and career ==
Jensen Daggett was born June 24, 1969, in Connecticut. Her grandparents were both child actors who met in Hollywood in their youth, and retired from performing before she was born.

After studying theater at Agoura High School in Agoura Hills, California, Daggett moved to Los Angeles after her eighteenth birthday to study at the Stella Adler Conservatory for Acting in Hollywood. At 18 years old, her first acting role was in The Fabulous Baker Boys. Soon after, she portrayed Rennie Wickham in Friday the 13th Part VIII: Jason Takes Manhattan (both 1989).

She also performed in several dozen television episodes before leaving acting in 1999 to raise her two sons. Some of her best-known roles were as Nancy Taylor, sister-in-law of Tim Taylor (wife of Tim's younger brother, Marty) on Home Improvement and Charlie in The Single Guy playing Jonathan Silverman's girlfriend. She also starred as Dr. Katie Cooper on the short-lived series Medicine Ball, a medical drama about doctors in a Seattle hospital.

In 2003, she appeared as herself in an episode of the HGTV Canada show, Weekend Warriors, in which she remodeled her Connecticut home.

After retiring from acting, Daggett pursued a career as a green building home designer and renovator.

== Filmography ==
Year	Title	Role	Notes	Ref.
1989	Friday the 13th Part VIII: Jason Takes Manhattan	Rennie Wickham		
1992	The Opposite Sex and How to Live with Them	Cheerleader		
1992	Majority Rule	Lucy	Television film	
1993	Spies	Karen Prescott	Television film	
1993	Dead Before Dawn	Dana	Television film	
1996	Project: ALF	Dr. Melissa Hill	Television film	
1997	Asteroid	Dr. Valerie Brennan	Television film	
1998	Major League: Back to the Minors	Maggie Reynolds		
1998	Telling You	Susan		
2009	His Name Was Jason: 30 Years of Friday the 13th	Herself	Documentary film	
2013	Crystal Lake Memories: The Complete History of Friday the 13th	Herself	Documentary film	

=== Television ===
Year	Title	Role	Notes	Ref.
1990	21 Jump Street	Ashley	Episode: "Awomp-Bomp-Aloobomb, Alomp Bamboom"	
1991	China Beach	Jennifer Robert	Episode: "Hello Goodbye"	
1992	Melrose Place	Marcy Garrett	Episode: "Friends and Lovers"	
1993	Step by Step	Bonnie	Episode: "The Marrying Dude"	
1993	The Adventures of Brisco County, Jr.	Charlotte Ketchum	Episode: "Brisco for the Defense"	
1994	Matlock	Sarah Eldridge	Episode: "The Godfather"	
1995	Medicine Ball	Dr. Katie Cooper	9 episodes	
1995	Home Improvement	Nancy Taylor	Recurring role	
1995	Strange Luck	Sarah Coughlin	Episode: "Last Chance"	
1995–1996	The Single Guy	Charlie McCarthy	6 episodes	
1996–1997	L.A. Firefighters	Dr. Janey Markle	4 episodes	
1999	Will & Grace	Grace Actor	Episode: "The Big Vent"	
1999	Get Real	Dr. Serena Wolff	Episode: "Passages"	
2003	Weekend Warriors	Herself	Episode: "Jensen Daggett's New Old Kitchen"	
2011	The Cynical Life of Harper Hall	Dani Stone	2 episodes	

== Sources ==
- Emert, Matt; Murdock, Tim (December 1, 2025). Friday the 13th: Jason Takes Manhattan - Interview with Jensen Daggett. Happy Horror Time (podcast) – via YouTube.
