= Lar Park Lincoln =

American actress (1961–2025)

- Lar Park Lincoln ca. mid 2010s
- Born: Laurie Jill Park; May 12, 1961; Dallas, Texas, U.S.
- Died: April 22, 2025 (aged 63); Dallas, Texas, U.S.
- Occupation: Actress
- Years active: 1985–2025
- Spouse: Michael Lincoln (m. 1981; died 1995)
- Children: 2

Laurie Jill "Lar" Park Lincoln (née Park; May 12, 1961 – April 22, 2025) was an American actress. She appeared in the 1987 film House II: The Second Story as Kate, the 1988 horror film Friday the 13th Part VII: The New Blood as Tina Shepard, and a 1988 episode of the anthology horror series Freddy's Nightmares as Karyn. Park Lincoln appeared in the television series Knots Landing from 1987 to 1991.

== Life and career ==
Lar Park Lincoln was born in Dallas, Texas on May 12, 1961. She made her acting debut appearing in the 1985 made-for-television movie Children of the Night and in 1987 played the leading role in the independent comedy film, The Princess Academy. Also in 1987, she appeared in the comedy horror House II: The Second Story and following year starred as Tina Shepard in the slasher film, Friday the 13th Part VII: The New Blood, the seventh installment in the Friday the 13th franchise. She also guest-starred on television series including Hunter, Outlaws, Highway to Heaven, Freddy's Nightmares, and Tour of Duty.

In 1987, Park Lincoln was cast as Linda Fairgate, the daughter-in-law to Karen Fairgate (played by series star Michele Lee) in the CBS prime time soap opera, Knots Landing. She first appeared in the two episodes of show's ninth season, before returning with bigger role as of season eleven to thirteenth. In 1988, Park also played Sally’s Friend in eight episodes of season 10 of Knots Landing. After leaving the series in 1991, she guest-starred on Murder, She Wrote, Space: Above and Beyond, and Beverly Hills, 90210.

Park Lincoln returned to acting in the mid-2000s, appearing in the Lifetime movie Inspector Mom: Kidnapped in Ten Easy Steps and low-budget productions. Her notable credits include comedy horror film Sky Sharks (2020), meta-slasher film 13 Fanboy (2021) where she plays a fictionalized version of herself being stalked and hunted by an obsessed Friday the 13th fan, and Rose Blood: A Friday the 13th Fan Film (2021), the unofficial fan film continuing the story of Tina Shepard, her character from Friday the 13th Part VII: The New Blood, for which she was nominated for a FANtastic Horror Film Festival Award for Best Actress in a Feature Film.

== Personal life and death ==
Park Lincoln was married to Michael Martin Lincoln on December 5, 1981, and remained married until his death on December 4, 1995. She had two children and was living near Dallas, Texas.

Park Lincoln battled breast cancer from 2008, and by 2012, had gone through numerous surgeries. She died of breast cancer on April 22, 2025, at the age of 63. Actors Audition Studios, which Park Lincoln founded, issued a statement: "Over her 45-year career, Lar left an unforgettable mark on Hollywood through her dynamic performances and dedication to mentoring aspiring actors."

== Filmography ==
=== Film ===
Year	Title	Role	Notes
1987	The Princess Academy	Cindy Cathcart	
1987	House II: The Second Story	Kate	
1988	Friday the 13th Part VII: The New Blood	Tina Shepard	
1990	Fatal Charm	Sandy	
2009	From The Dark	Gail Miller	
2009	Gravestoned	Monica	
2013	Crystal Lake Memories: The Complete History of Friday the 13th	Herself	Documentary film
2020	Sky Sharks	Sidney Scott	
2020	Expulsion	Shara Fanning	
2021	13 Fanboy	Herself	
2021	Autumn Road	Kennedy	
2021	Rose Blood: A Friday the 13th Fan Film	Tina Shepard	
2022	Ghost Party	Victoria	
2023	Young Bolsheviks	Mayor	
2025	Bad B*tch	Rowena	Posthumous release

=== Television ===
Year	Title	Role	Notes
1985	Children of the Night	Valerie	Television film
1986	Heart of the City	Tracy	Episode: "Busted"
1987	Hunter	Angela Holly Hobarts	Episode: "Bad Company"
1987	Outlaws	Grady Bennett	Episode: "Pursued"
1987	Ohara	Cindy	Episode: "The Sparrow"
1987	Highway to Heaven	Denise Kelly	Episode: "In with the 'In' Crowd"
1987–1991	Knots Landing	Linda Fairgate	Recurring role (seasons 11–12), 48 episodes
1988	Freddy's Nightmares	Karyn	Episode: "It's a Miserable Life"
1989	Tour of Duty	Abigail Curtis	Episode: "Nightmare"
1992	Murder, She Wrote	Caroline Pryce	Episode: "Incident in Lot 7"
1995	Space: Above and Beyond	Bowman	Episode: "Ray Butts"
1995	Beverly Hills, 90210	Tammy Kane	Episode: "Fortunate Son"
2005	City of Justice	Susan Foley	Episode: "The Burns of Revenge"
2007	Inspector Mom: Kidnapped in Ten Easy Steps	Regina Von Hoffman	Television film
2009	His Name Was Jason: 30 Years of Friday the 13th	Herself	Documentary film
2013	Crystal Lake Memories: The Complete History of Friday the 13th	Herself	Documentary film
