= Freddy's Nightmares =

American horror anthology television series

- Also known as: Freddy's Nightmares: A Nightmare on Elm Street: The Series; A Nightmare on Elm Street: Freddy's Nightmares
- Genre: Horror; Anthology
- Created by: Wes Craven (Note: Character created by)
- Presented by: Robert Englund
- Theme music composer: Nicholas Pike
- Composers: Peter Bernstein; Junior Homrich; Gary S. Scott; Randy Tico; Thomas Chase Jones; Steve Rucker
- Country of origin: United States
- Original language: English
- No. of seasons: 2
- No. of episodes: 44 (list of episodes)

Production
- Executive producers: Jeff Freilich; Robert Shaye; Scott A. Stone
- Producer: Gilbert Adler
- Camera setup: Single-camera
- Running time: 44–46 minutes
- Production companies: Stone Television; New Line Television

Original release
- Network: Syndication
- Release: October 8, 1988 – March 12, 1990

Freddy's Nightmares (also known as A Nightmare on Elm Street: The Series) is an American horror anthology television series that aired in syndication from October 8, 1988, until March 12, 1990. A spin-off from the A Nightmare on Elm Street film series, each episode is introduced by Freddy Krueger (played by Robert Englund, as in the films) and features two different stories. Eight episodes throughout the series feature Freddy Krueger as the main antagonist. The pilot episode, directed by Tobe Hooper, begins with Krueger's prosecution on child-murder charges.

The series was produced by New Line Television, and Stone Television. It was originally distributed by Lorimar-Telepictures. After Lorimar-Telepictures was acquired by Warner Bros. Television in 1989, Warner Bros. assumed syndication rights. In 1996, Warner Bros. acquired New Line Cinema holding both production and distribution rights.

== Premise ==
Due to the murderous nature of Freddy Krueger, New Line Cinema opted not to develop a television series with a regular cast of characters interacting with Krueger continuously, as he would inevitably kill most of them, leaving no one left. Instead, the producers created an anthology series, featuring a new cast of actors for each episode.

Each episode tells a different story with dark or grim themes, set in the town of Springwood, Ohio, specifically on Elm Street, the same setting as the A Nightmare on Elm Street films. Although the Freddy Krueger character occasionally plays a role in the plot, most of the stories do not involve him directly. However, it is often hinted that Krueger indirectly influenced the desolate nature of the plotlines.

Similar to the Crypt Keeper in Tales from the Crypt, Krueger's primary function is to host the series. He appears in regular bumper segments, offering ominous or slapstick reactions to the episode's events, culminating in a quick and usually eerie epilogue at the end.

One unique element of the series is its two-tier story approach. Most episodes feature two different stories, each occupying the first and second halves of the episode. The second story usually builds on a character who played a minor or supporting role in the first.

Several episodes throughout the second season form mini-arcs, where the events of one episode are followed up and/or referenced in a later episode. For example, the episode "Interior Loft" was given a direct sequel, "Interior Loft-Later," and "Lucky Stiff" was followed up with "Easy Come, Easy Go."

Torrance High School was used as the filming location for Springwood High School, predating its use in later horror series like Buffy the Vampire Slayer.

== Cast ==
The only actor from the film series retained for the TV series was Robert Englund, as Freddy Krueger.

Some of the featured actors who went on to later become notable were:

- Rosalind Allen
- Robin Antin
- Shiri Appleby
- Sarah Buxton
- Bill Camp
- Kyle Chandler
- Morris Chestnut
- Clifton Collins Jr.
- Raymond Cruz
- Richard Eden
- Mariska Hargitay
- Penny Johnson Jerald
- Eva LaRue
- Phill Lewis
- John Cameron Mitchell
- Bill Moseley
- Yvette Nipar
- Lori Petty
- Brad Pitt
- Tim Russ
- Richard Speight Jr.
- Glynn Turman

Other notable guest stars featured in the series were:

- Marc Alaimo
- Sandahl Bergman
- Timothy Bottoms
- Jeffrey Combs
- Jeff Conaway
- Mary Crosby
- Burr DeBenning
- Ellen Albertini Dow
- Tony Dow
- Diane Franklin
- Richard Gautier
- Kip Gilman
- Tamara Glynn
- Bob Goen
- Wings Hauser
- Tiffany Helm
- Mark Herrier
- Joyce Hyser
- Jill Jacobson
- David Lander
- George Lazenby
- Lar Park Lincoln
- Dick Miller
- Susan Oliver
- Philip Proctor
- Paul Regina
- Martha Smith
- Jay Thomas
- Glen Vernon
- Tracey Walter
- Jill Whitlow

== Episodes ==
With the exception of the pilot, and the first season's seventh episode "Sister's Keeper", all of the episodes carried two separate storylines. The first half hour would be devoted to one story, while the last half hour would be devoted to a second storyline.

=== Series overview ===
Season	Episodes	Originally released	
Season	Episodes	First released	Last released
1	22	October 8, 1988	May 27, 1989
2	22	October 9, 1989	March 12, 1990

== Home media ==
=== VHS ===
In the US, five VHS tapes were released by Warner Home Video in September 1991. Each tape featured one episode. The episodes released were:

- "No More Mr. Nice Guy"
- "Lucky Stiff"
- "It's My Party and You'll Die If I Want You To"
- "Dreams That Kill"
- "Freddy's Tricks and Treats"

In the UK, eight VHS tapes were released by Braveworld Ltd., originally in 1989 as rental-only tapes and then again in 1993 to the sell-through market. Each tape features two episodes. The tapes released were:

- The Nightmare Begins Again: "No More Mr. Nice Guy" and "Killer Instinct"
- Freddy's Nightmares 2: "Sister's Keeper" and "Freddy's Tricks and Treats"
- Rock Me, Freddy: "Judy Miller, Come on Down" and "The Bride Wore Red"
- Saturday Nightmare Fever: "The End Of The World" and "Saturday Night Special"
- Do Dreams Bleed?: "Do Dreams Bleed" and "Rebel Without a Car"
- Freddy's Mother's Day: "Mother's Day" and "Black Tickets"
- Safe Sex: "Safe Sex" and "Deadline"
- It's a Miserable Life: "It's a Miserable Life" and "Love Stinks"

In Germany, eight VHS tapes were released by Virgin Video, originally in 1989 as rental-only tapes. Each tape features two episodes.

- Freddy - Wie alles begann: "No More Mr. Nice Guy" and "Killer Instinct"
- Schere, Tupfer, Kralle...: "Freddy's Tricks and Treats" and "It's a Miserable Life"
- Saturday Nightmare Fever: "Saturday Night Special" and "Judy Miller, Come On Down"
- Freddy's Muttertag: "Sister's Keeper" and "Mother's Day"
- Rock me Freddy: "Rebel Without a Car" and "The Bride Wore Red"
- Blutige Träume: "Do Dreams Bleed" and "Out To Lunch" aka "The End Of The World"
- Freddy's Killerinstinkt: "Deadline" and "Black Tickets"
- Freddy's Höhenkoller: "School Daze" and "Cabin Fever"

=== DVD & Blu-ray ===
In 2003, Volume 1 (the first 3 episodes) was released on Region 2 DVD in Ireland and the UK, by Warner Home Video. Volume 2 and Volume 3 was also planned to be released later in future years to come, however, Warner canceled the releases due to poor sales.

In 2011, a Blu-ray collection of the original seven A Nightmare on Elm Street films was released in the US. The set included a DVD with special features, which included two episodes of the show ("It's a Miserable Life" and "Killer Instinct").

In 2022, 16 German-dubbed episodes were published in Germany by Pidax.

== Syndication ==
The series originally aired in syndication across the United States. Due to its violent and sexual content, episodes were often heavily edited before being broadcast. A notable example is the season 1 finale, "Safe Sex," which had eight minutes of explicit footage removed.

In 2006, AOL partnered with Warner Bros. Television to make Freddy's Nightmares available on its new broadband service, In2TV.

NBCUniversal's horror-themed cable channel, Chiller, aired monthly marathons of Freddy's Nightmares. Both seasons were shown consecutively with commercial breaks, but the channel stopped airing the series on March 31, 2011.

In the UK, Sky and Virgin Media customers could watch the entire first series on Zone Horror, airing one episode per night at 8 PM, starting June 8, 2009.

In Sweden, TV4 Guld aired the show weekly from 2010 to 2012.

El Rey Network began airing the series on November 3, 2015.

As of February 15, 2022, the series became available on Screambox, a streaming service focused on horror content.

As of 2024, Freddy's Nightmares is not available on Warner Bros. Discovery's streaming service, Max. Instead, it is now streaming on Tubi, a free, ad-supported platform owned by Fox Corporation.

== Reception ==
Mark Pellegrini of Adventures in Poor Taste gave the show an overall rating of 6 out of 10. In his review, he explains that only 8 out of the 44 episodes focus on Freddy Krueger, which influenced his rating. Among these, "Photo Finish" received the highest praise, while "Safe Sex" was deemed the weakest. The episode "No More Mr. Nice Guy" was seen as paying homage to the first five Nightmare on Elm Street films. However, he notes that the scene where Freddy is burned alive, depicted in this episode, is shown differently in Freddy vs. Jason and Freddy's Dead: The Final Nightmare, both of which came out after the episode premiered.

John Kenneth Muir in his book Terror Television (2001) placed Freddy's Nightmares as the worst of the horror television programs between 1970 and 1999. Muir found the series having uninteresting stories and that its production was so low that it appeared to be homemade, and that it wasted the talents of Englund.

== Legacy ==
The genesis of the series and its impact were later revisited in the 2010 documentary Never Sleep Again: The Elm Street Legacy, which features interviews with a number of the show's writers, directors and other parties involved like original Elm Street director Wes Craven and New Line producer Bob Shaye. The Blu-ray release of the documentary includes outtakes from the series as well as footage that was deleted due to it being too graphic for television.

== Sources ==
- Muir, John Kenneth (2001). Terror Television: American Series, 1970-1999. McFarland & Company, Inc. ISBN 0-7864-0890-1.
