= List of programs broadcast by Ion Television =

This is a list of programs broadcast by Ion Television, both past and present.

== Current programming ==
Note: Titles are listed in alphabetical order followed by the year of debut in parentheses.

=== Syndicated programming ===
==== Drama ====
- Blue Bloods (2014)
- Chicago Fire (2021)
- Chicago P.D. (2019)
- FBI (2023)
- Law & Order: Special Victims Unit (2015)
- NCIS (2008–2010; 2022)
- S.W.A.T. (2026)

=== Sports programming ===
==== Events ====
- Women's National Basketball Association (2023)
- National Women's Soccer League (2024)

=== Children's programming ===
Title	Premiere date
Xploration Awesome Planet	January 1, 2021

== Original Christmas movies ==
Title	Year
Christmas Town	2008
A Golden Christmas	2009
Christmas Mail	2010
12 Wishes of Christmas	2011
A Holiday Heist	2011
A Golden Christmas 2: The Second Tail	2011
A Christmas Kiss	2011
Anything But Christmas	2012
A Golden Christmas 3	2012
Christmas Twister	2012
My Santa	2013
Holiday Road Trip	2013
Christmas Belle	2013
A Christmas Mystery	2014
Merry Ex-Mas	2014
A Christmas Kiss II	2014
A Perfect Christmas List	2014
Back To Christmas	2014
A Prince for Christmas	2015
Merry Kissmas	2015
A Christmas Truce	2015
A Christmas in Vermont	2016
A Firehouse Christmas	2016
A Cinderella Christmas	2016
A Husband For Christmas	2016
Snowdance	2017
The Spruce and The Pines	2017
Runaway Christmas Bride	2017
A Royal Christmas Ball	2017
A Christmas Cruise	2017
A Wedding for Christmas	2018
Christmas Cupid's Arrow	2018
A Snow White Christmas	2018
Rent-an-Elf	2018
Country Christmas Album	2018
A Christmas in Royal Fashion	2018
A Christmas Princess	2019
Christmas Matchmakers	2019
Best Christmas Ball Ever!	2019
A Beauty & the Beast Christmas	2019
12 Pups of Christmas	2019
Christmas Crush	2019
A Royal Christmas Engagement	2020
Christmas Together	2020
Beaus of Holly	2020
The Christmas Sitters	2020
Christmas Down Under	2021
A Christmas Witness	2021
The Christmas Thief	2021
A New Lease On Christmas	2021
The Case of the Christmas Diamond	2022
Dognapped: Hound for the Holidays	2022
The Search for Secret Santa	2022
A Prince and Pauper Christmas	2022

== Former programming ==
=== Original programming ===
==== Comedy ====
- World Cup Comedy (2004–2005)

==== Drama ====
- Body and Soul (2002–2003)
- Chicken Soup for the Soul (1999–2000)
- Doc (2001–2004)
- Flipper: The New Adventures (1998–2000)
- Hope Island (1999–2000)
- Just Cause (2002–2003)
- Little Men (1998–1999)
- Mysterious Ways (2000–2002)
- Palmetto Pointe (2005)
- Ponderosa (2001–2002)
- Sue Thomas: F.B.Eye (2002–2005)
- Young Blades (2005)

==== Unscripted programming ====
- America's Most Talented Kid (2004–2005)
- Animal Tails (2003–2004)
- Animals Are People Too (1999)
- Candid Camera (2001–2004)
- Cold Turkey (2004–2005)
- Destination Stardom (1999–2000)
- Ed McMahon's Next Big Star (2001–2002)
- Encounters With the Unexplained (2000–2002)
- Xtreme Fakeovers (2005)
- It's a Miracle (1998–2004)
- Lie Detector (2005)
- Masters of Illusion (2000)
- Miracle Pets (2000–2005)
- Model Citizens (2004)
- Second Verdict (2004)
- Totally Pets (2003–2004)
- Treasures in Your Home (1999–2000)

==== Game shows ====
- Balderdash (2004–2005)
- Beat the Clock (2002–2003)
- Dirty Rotten Cheater (2003)
- Genesis (2000)
- Hollywood Showdown (2000)
- On the Cover (2004)
- Opportunity Knocks (2002–2003)
- The Reel to Reel Picture Show (1998)
- Shop 'til You Drop (2000–2005)
- Supermarket Sweep (2000–2003)
- Twenty-One (2000)

==== Talk and how-to programming ====
- The Emeril Lagasse Show (2010)
- Great Day America (1998–1999)
- Woman's Day (1999)

==== Religious programming ====
- Faith Under Fire (2004–2005)

==== Sports programming ====
===== Events =====
- BodogFight (2007)
- Champions Tour Golf
- Conference USA College Football (2005–2007)
- FLW Bass Fishing
- Paralympic Games (2000)
- Real Pro Wrestling (2005–2006)
- United States Track and Field Olympic Trials (2000)
- Women's United Soccer Association (2002–2003)

===== Programs =====
- NFL Films Game of the Week (2007)
- WWE Main Event (2012–2014)

==== Canadian co-productions ====
- Twice in a Lifetime (1999–2001)
- The Border (2009–2010)
- Durham County (2007–2010)
- Flashpoint (2011–2017)
- The Guard (2008–2009)
- Private Eyes (2018–2021)
- The Listener (2012)
- Saving Hope (2016)

==== Specials ====
- 12-12-12: The Concert for Sandy Relief (December 12, 2012) (Note: The concert was cut short to reshow the WWE Main Event.)
- GMA Dove Awards
- Mrs. America Pageant (2002)
- Mrs. World Pageant (2001)

==== Children's programming (Qubo) ====
- My Friend Rabbit
- Turbo Dogs
- Shelldon

=== Acquired programming ===
==== Children's programming (Qubo) ====
- 3-2-1 Penguins!
- Animal Science (2018–2026)
- Babar
- The Choo Choo Bob Show (2015–2017)
- Dive Olly Dive (2015–2016)
- Doki (2015–2016; 2016–2017)
- Dragon
- Finding Stuff Out (2020; 2021)
- Giver (2018–2019)
- Guess with Jess (2014–2015)
- Harry and His Bucket Full of Dinosaurs (2014–2015)
- Jacob Two-Two
- Jane and the Dragon
- Look Kool (2018–2019)
- The Magic School Bus
- Pearlie
- Postman Pat (2007–2008)
- Raggs (2016–2017)
- Safari Tracks (2019–2020)
- Science Max (2021–2025)
- Timothy Goes to School (2014–2015)
- VeggieTales (2006–2009)
- Willa's Wild Life
- Zoo Clues (2017–2018; 2019–2020)
- The Zula Patrol

=== Syndicated programming ===
==== Children's programming ====
- The Adventures of Super Mario Bros. 3 (1998–1999)
- The Adventures of Swiss Family Robinson (1998–1999)
- Archie's Weird Mysteries (1999–2000)
- California Dreams (2001)
- The Get Along Gang (1998–1999)
- Hurricanes (1998)
- Inquiring Minds (1998–1999)
- Just Deal (2001)
- Starcom: The U.S. Space Force (1998)
- Super Mario World (1998–1999)
- Sylvanian Families (1998–1999)
- The Toothbrush Family (1998)
- Where on Earth Is Carmen Sandiego? (1999–2000)
- Zak Tales (1998)

==== Comedy ====
- Alice (2007–2008)
- Amen (2006–2007)
- Bosom Buddies (2002–2007)
- Dave's World (1998–1999, 2001–2002, 2006–2007)
- Designing Women (2007–2008)
- The Drew Carey Show (2007–2009)
- The Facts of Life (2007–2010)
- George Lopez (2011–2012)
- Green Acres (2006–2007)
- Growing Pains (2006–2007)
- Hangin' with Mr. Cooper (2008–2009)
- Here's Lucy (2008–2009)
- The Hogan Family (2008–2009)
- Mama's Family (2006–2008)
- Married... with Children (2012–2014)
- M*A*S*H (2008–2010)
- The Monkees (2006)
- My Name Is Earl (2009–2013)
- Perfect Strangers (2007)
- Pushing Daisies (2008)
- Reba (2009)
- The Steve Harvey Show (2008–2009)
- The Wayans Bros. (2008)
- Welcome Back, Kotter (2006–2007)
- Who's the Boss? (2007–2008)
- The Wonder Years (2007)

==== Drama ====
- The 10th Kingdom (miniseries, 2000)
- Battlestar Galactica (2007)
- Baywatch (2008)
- The Big Valley (1998–2001)
- Blue Skies (1998–1999)
- Bonanza (1998–2007)
- Bones (2023–2026)
- Boston Legal (2008–2009)
- Bull (2024–2026)
- Burn Notice (2013–2017)
- Charlie's Angels (2006–2007)
- Christy (1998–2001)
- Cold Case (2012–2015)
- Criminal Minds (2009–2021; 2022–2025)
- Criminal Minds: Suspect Behavior (2015)
- CSI: Crime Scene Investigation (2018–2019)
- CSI: Miami (2020–2021)
- The Dead Zone (2008)
- Diagnosis: Murder (1998–2007)
- Dr. Quinn, Medicine Woman (1999–2000)
- Early Edition (2003–2006)
- Eight Is Enough (1998–2001)
- ER (2008–2009)
- Father Dowling Mysteries (1998–2000)
- Ghost Whisperer (2009–2016)
- Hawaii Five-0 (2021–2026)
- Highway to Heaven (1998–2000)
- House (2012–2013)
- I'll Fly Away (1998–1999)
- Kojak (2007)
- Kung Fu (2007)
- Law & Order (2015–2021)
- Law & Order: Criminal Intent (2012–2020)
- Leverage (2012–2019; 2022–2023)
- Leverage: Redemption (2022–2023)
- Life Goes On (1998–2000)
- The Love Boat (1998–1999)
- MacGyver (2022–2023)
- Magnum P.I. (2024–2026)
- Medical Center (1998–1999)
- Medium (2009–2012)
- Monk (2011–2014)
- NCIS: Los Angeles (2017–2026)
- NCIS: New Orleans (2021–2025)
- Numb3rs (2012–2017)
- Our House (2000–2001)
- Promised Land (2001–2002)
- Psych (2011–2018)
- Quantum Leap (2008–2009)
- Remington Steele (2000–2002)
- Rookie Blue (2014–2015)
- Scarecrow and Mrs. King (2000–2002)
- Shark (2010)
- Touched by an Angel (1998–2002)
- White Collar (2013–2014)
- Without a Trace (2009–2014)

==== Unscripted programming ====
- America's Funniest Home Videos (2003–2005, reruns of the Bob Saget run from Seasons 1 to 5)
- Jack Hanna's Animal Adventures (1998–2000)
- Moral Court (2007)
- The People's Court (Wapner version)
- Texas Justice (2010)

==== Religion ====
- Programming from The Worship Network (1998–2005; aired on a subchannel of Ion-owned stations until 2010)

==== Game shows ====
- Born Lucky (1999–2000)
- Family Feud (2008–2010, episodes hosted by John O'Hurley)
- Pyramid (2004–2006, episodes of the version hosted by Donny Osmond)
- Shop 'til You Drop (1999–2000, reruns of the Family Channel and Lifetime versions)
- Supermarket Sweep (1999, reruns of the Lifetime version)
- Weakest Link (2001–2003)

==== News and information ====
- 48 Hours
- Local NBC News, CBS News, ABC News, and Fox News primetime news broadcasts and/or rebroadcasts (select stations, 2000–2005)
- MoneyWatchTV.com (2000–2001)
- WeatherVision (2000–2005)

== See also ==
- Ion Media
