= Friday the 13th Part VII: The New Blood =

1988 film by John Carl Buechler

- Theatrical release poster
- Directed by: John Carl Buechler
- Written by: Manuel Fidello; Daryl Haney
- Based on: Characters by Victor Miller
- Produced by: Iain Paterson
- Starring: Lar Park Lincoln; Kevin Blair; Susan Blu; Terry Kiser; Susan Jennifer Sullivan; Elizabeth Kaitan; Jon Renfield; Jeff Bennett; Heidi Kozak; Diana Barrows; Larry Cox; Craig Thomas; Diane Almeida; Kane Hodder
- Cinematography: Paul Elliott
- Edited by: Maureen O'Connell; Martin Jay Sadoff; Barry Zetlin
- Music by: Harry Manfredini; Fred Mollin
- Production companies: Friday Four, Inc.
- Distributed by: Paramount Pictures
- Release date: May 13, 1988
- Running time: 88 minutes
- Country: United States
- Language: English
- Budget: $2.8 million
- Box office: $19.2 million

Friday the 13th Part VII: The New Blood is a 1988 American supernatural slasher film directed by John Carl Buechler and starring Lar Park Lincoln, Kevin Blair, Susan Blu, Terry Kiser, and Kane Hodder in his first appearance as Jason Voorhees, a role he would reprise in three subsequent films. It is a sequel to Friday the 13th Part VI: Jason Lives (1986) and the seventh installment in the Friday the 13th franchise. Set seven years after the events of the previous film, the plot follows a psychokinetic teenage girl (Lincoln) who unwittingly releases Jason from his tomb at the bottom of Crystal Lake, allowing him to go on another killing spree in the area.

The New Blood was intended to have a higher standard of quality than that of the previous installments, with high-profile directors being considered to helm the project. Paramount Pictures sought a partnership with New Line Cinema to create a crossover film between the Friday the 13th and Nightmare on Elm Street series which would not come to fruition until New Line bought the rights to the franchise, releasing Freddy vs. Jason in 2003. After several failed concepts, screenwriter Daryl Haney suggested an idea akin to "Jason vs. Carrie", in which Jason would battle a teenage girl with psychokinetic abilities.

The film was released on May 13, 1988, to mostly negative reviews from critics, and grossed $19.2 million at the U.S. box office on a budget of $2.8 million. It was followed by Friday the 13th Part VIII: Jason Takes Manhattan the following year.

== Plot ==
After witnessing her alcoholic father John physically abusing her mother Amanda, a young Tina Shepard attempts to escape the chaos at home and heads out onto Crystal Lake in a boat. When John follows her in an attempt to stop her, Tina's dormant telekinetic abilities emerge, and she accidentally destroys the dock John is standing on, causing him to fall into the lake and drown.

Years later, a teenage Tina is still struggling with remorse surrounding John's death. Amanda takes her to the same lakeside residence as part of her treatment from her psychiatrist, Dr. Crews. He begins a series of experiments (verbal assaults) designed to agitate Tina's mental state, forcing her powers to become more pronounced. While Dr. Crews claims to be treating Tina, in reality, he is only trying to exploit her psychic powers. After a particularly upsetting session with Dr. Crews, Tina runs from the cabin and to the dock thinking about John's death. While thinking about him, she wishes he would come back. Her powers unwittingly awaken mass murderer Jason Voorhees, who had been chained to the bottom of Crystal Lake by Tommy Jarvis seven years prior, (Note: As depicted in Friday the 13th Part VI: Jason Lives) and he emerges from the water to commit another killing spree.

Next door to the Shepard residence is a group of teens who are throwing a birthday party for their friend Michael Rogers. The group includes Michael's cousin Nick, preppy Russell and his girlfriend Sandra, Ben and his girlfriend Kate, science-fiction writer Eddie, stoner David, perky Robin, shy Maddy, and snobby socialite Melissa. Nick, who has arrived just for the party, becomes attracted to Tina, much to Melissa's chagrin. Melissa attempts to break up Nick and Tina, even going as far as kissing Eddie to make Nick jealous, but her schemes are to no avail – other than making Eddie feel spurned thereafter. Tina tells Nick about Jason and has a vision of him murdering Michael. Meanwhile, Jason kills Michael and his girlfriend Jane McDowell, later murdering Dan Carter and Judy Williams, another couple camping in the woods, as well.

When Tina goes off with Nick to find Amanda, Jason proceeds to kill the other teens one by one. Russell and Sandra go to the lake for a swim. While Sandra goes skinny-dipping, Russell is killed with an axe to his face. Sandra discovers his body before she is pulled under the water and drowned. Maddy goes looking for David but Jason drops down Russell's body, sending her running into a nearby barn where Jason pursues and kills her with a sickle, kills Ben by crushing his skull and then kills Kate by driving a party horn into her eye. Inside the house, Jason stabs David and slices Eddie's neck open. Upstairs, Robin finds David's severed head and is defenestrated to her death. When Jason attacks Dr. Crews, he saves himself by using Amanda as a human shield, but Jason eventually kills him with a brushcutter. Tina finds Amanda's body shortly afterward and uses her powers to electrocute Jason and crash part of the house down onto him. When Nick and Tina try to tell Melissa what happened, she thinks that they are crazy and tries to leave, but Jason kills her with an axe to the face.

Nick tries to fight off Jason, but he is quickly subdued. Tina unleashes her powers, breaking Jason's mask and exposing his disfigured and decomposed face. As the battle rages on, the Shepard lakeside cabin is destroyed by an explosive fire and the attack continues on the dock. Although Tina is unable to kill Jason, she focuses and summons the spirit of her father, who rises from the lake and drags Jason back down with him into the depths of Crystal Lake, chaining the serial killer once more.

The following morning, Tina and Nick are taken away in an ambulance. A firefighter finds Jason's broken mask in the wreckage, and the screen fades to black as Jason's whispers can be heard in the distance.

== Cast ==
- Lar Park Lincoln as Tina Shepard
  - Jennifer Banko as Young Tina Shepard
- Kevin Blair as Nick Rogers
- Susan Blu as Amanda Shepard
- Terry Kiser as Dr. Chris Crews
- Susan Jennifer Sullivan as Melissa Paur
- Elizabeth Kaitan as Robin Peterson
- Jon Renfield as David Peabody
- Jeff Bennett as Eddie McCarlo
- Heidi Kozak as Sandra Casey
- Diana Barrows as Maddy Paulson
- Larry Cox as Russell Bowen
- Craig Thomas as Ben MacNeal
- Diane Almeida as Kate Pataki
- Kane Hodder as Jason Voorhees
- William Butler as Michael Rogers
- Staci Greason as Jane McDowell
- Debora Kessler as Judy Williams
- Michael Schroeder as Dan Carter
- John Otrin as John Shepard
- John Carl Buechler as Firefighter (uncredited)
- Walt Gorney as Narrator (uncredited)

== Production ==
=== Conception ===
After the previous installment, Friday the 13th Part VI: Jason Lives, which reintroduced the Jason Voorhees character, Part VII was originally intended to be a crossover film between Jason Voorhees and Freddy Krueger. With each Friday the 13th sequel, the box office profits were diminishing, with the films in the Nightmare on Elm Street series grossing nearly twice the amount of the Friday films. Paramount Pictures proposed the crossover idea to New Line Cinema, the rival company who held the rights to the Elm Street films, with Paramount controlling domestic distribution and New Line controlling international distribution. The idea was abandoned after the two companies failed to come to an agreement, with the concept only coming to fruition after New Line purchased the rights to the Friday the 13th franchise, releasing Freddy vs. Jason in 2003.

One of the concepts for Part VII was conceived by associate producer Barbara Sachs, and was noted as being similar to the plot of Jaws, wherein a corporate land developer covers up the previous Jason Voorhees massacres in order to profitably build condos on Crystal Lake. Executive producer Frank Mancuso Jr. resisted the idea, and screenwriter Daryl Haney stated "There's always a teenage girl who's left to battle Jason by herself. What if the girl had telekinetic powers?" Sachs, who considered the "Jason vs. Carrie" concept to be "an interesting idea", wanted the installment to be more respectable than the previous entries in the series. Haney stated that "She wanted it to be unlike any other Friday the 13th movie. She wanted it to win an Academy Award". Several high-profile directors were considered for the job, including Italian filmmaker Federico Fellini.

=== Development ===
The film's original working title was Birthday Bash, chosen to conceal its identity as a Friday the 13th film. The entire production of this film was scheduled, completed, and released within seven months. Shooting took place from October to November 1987 in Baldwin County, Alabama, at Byrnes Lake off SR 225, and in nearby Mobile in February 1988.

This film marks the first of four appearances by Kane Hodder as Jason, the only actor to ever reprise the role. Although C. J. Graham, who had portrayed Jason in Part VI, was initially considered, Hodder was ultimately chosen based on his work in the film Prison, for which The New Blood's director, John Carl Buechler, had worked on as the special effects make-up artist. In that movie, Hodder filmed a scene in which his character Charlie Forsythe, a prisoner executed in the electric chair, rises from the grave; Hodder himself had suggested to Buechler that he have maggots coming out of his mouth during the scene to heighten the effect of decomposition, and went on to film the sequence with live maggots spilling out of his mouth. Buechler remembered Hodder's commitment to the part when casting The New Blood, and chose Hodder over Graham. Graham expressed disappointment, as he had hoped to reprise the role of Jason and make himself synonymous with the character, as Boris Karloff had with Frankenstein's monster, but ultimately expressed satisfaction with Hodder's portrayal and said that he bore no ill will about not being asked to return. Hodder would go on to make cinematic history for the longest uninterrupted onscreen controlled burn in Hollywood history. For the scene in which Tina Shepard (Lar Park Lincoln) causes a furnace to shoot flames at Jason, Hodder was actually set on fire by an apparatus rigged so that the ignition could be captured on film (as opposed to being edited in later with trick photography). Hodder was on fire for a full forty seconds, a record at the time.

=== Post-production ===
Though one contemporary critic noted that the film is "nearly devoid of blood and gore by '80s slasher standards", several explicit scenes of gore were cut in order to avoid an X rating.

== Music ==
Friday the 13th Part VII: The New Blood

Soundtrack album by Harry Manfredini and Fred Mollin
- Released: October 30, 2020 (La-La Land)
- Recorded: 1988
- Genre: Film score
- Length: 78:22
- Label: La-La Land

On September 27, 2005, BSX Records released a limited edition CD of Fred Mollin's Friday the 13th Part VII and Friday the 13th Part VIII: Jason Takes Manhattan scores. A vinyl release of the soundtrack including the complete Fred Mollin cues, along with material by Harry Manfredini was released by Waxwork Records in July 2020 and on CD by La-La Land Records in the United States on October 30, 2020.

== Home media ==
A standard DVD without bonus materials was released by Paramount on September 3, 2002. "The Deluxe" DVD Edition was released September 15, 2009. Paramount and Warner Brothers co-released the Friday the 13th: The Complete Collection Blu-ray box set on September 13, 2013, featuring each of the twelve films. Paramount re-released the film in another box set titled, Friday the 13th: The Ultimate Collection in February 2018; the box set features only the first eight films of the franchise.

== Reception ==
=== Box office ===
Friday the 13th Part VII: The New Blood opened on Friday, May 13, 1988 in 1,796 theaters, debuting at number 1 and earning $8.2 million in its opening weekend. Ultimately, the film would go on to gross a total of $19.1 million at the U.S. box office with 4,664,234 admissions, placing it at number 53 on the list of the year's top earners and continuing the series' decline in sales.

=== Critical response ===
Friday the 13th Part VII: The New Blood was not screened in advance for critics. On the review aggregator website Rotten Tomatoes, the film holds an approval rating of 21% based on 75 reviews, with an average rating of 3.2/10. The site's critics consensus reads: "Offering fleeting novelty amid formula killings and gratuitous exploitation, Friday the 13th Part VII: The New Blood tries and fails to take the series in any genuinely new direction." On Metacritic, it has a weighted average score of 13 out of 100, based on nine critics, indicating "overwhelming dislike." Audiences polled by CinemaScore gave the film an average grade of "B" on an A+ to F scale.

Gene Siskel gave the film one star in the Chicago Tribune, citing its weak finale and predictable killings, as well as a perceived misogynistic subtext to the entire Friday the 13th series. Steve Davis's review in The Austin Chronicle, written entirely in verse, characterized the repetitive plotline of the series as tiresome and implausible, with campers repeatedly coming to Crystal Lake despite the repeated slaughter of visitors. He gave it a bomb. Susy Flory of The Santa Clarita Valley Signal wrote: "It's Hollywood's idea of every teenager's dream—a bunch of lovely, nubile young girls, a rustic cabin in the woods, a stash of marijuana, and, gore galore courtesy of a zombie superhuman psycho killer." The Star-Gazette's Amnon Kabatchnik wrote that the film is "geared to appeal to the viewers' baser instincts, horrific moments of graphic mutilation are interwoven with nude-and-sex sequences," adding: "The offbeat Tina is reminiscent of Stephen King's Carrie, but unlike Sissy Spacek, Lar Park Lincoln is unable to flesh out a human dimension. Cult devotees of the series probably won't care."

The film is mentioned in the novels American Psycho by Bret Easton Ellis and The Time Traveler's Wife by Audrey Niffenegger.
