= Satan's School for Girls =

Satan's School for Girls may refer to:

- Satan's School for Girls (1973 film), TV movie
- Satan's School for Girls (2000 film), remake
