= Russell Wiggins (actor) =

American actor (born 1945)

- Born: May 15, 1945 (age 80); Tyler, Texas, US
- Other names: Russell C Wiggins; Russell Garland Wiggins
- Occupation: Actor
- Years active: 1955–1988

Russell Wiggins (born May 15, 1945) is an actor who was active from the 1950s through the 1980s. He acted primarily on television, with roles in shows including Gunsmoke (1973) (1974), Marcus Welby, MD (1972), and Buck Rogers in the 25th Century (1979). He appeared opposite Kate Jackson in the 1972 movie Limbo.

He has appeared under the names Russell Wiggins, Russell C Wiggins, Russell Wiggens, and Russell Garland Wiggins.

== Filmography ==
=== Television ===
Russell Wiggins appeared a variety of popular television series during the Silver Age of television, including Gunsmoke, Adam-12, Marcus Welby, M.D., and Ironside. Most of his appearance are listed in the table below:

Television appearances by Russell Wiggins
TV Show	Year	Episode	Role
The Bold Ones: The New Doctors	1971	The Convicts (S3:E5)	Wilbur¹
Alias Smith and Jones	1971	The Posse That Wouldn't Quit (S2:E5)	Hank Smithers¹
O'Hara, U.S. Treasury	1971	Operation: Moonshine (S1:E12)	Pete Harper
Adam-12	1972	The Parole Violator (S4:E17)	Bill Morry
Ironside	1972	Five Days in the Death of Sgt. Brown - Part 1 (S6:E1)	Richard Wells
The Bold Ones: The New Doctors	1972	Five Days In The Death Of Sgt. Brown, Part 2 (S4:E1)	Richard Wells
Marcus Welby, M.D.	1972	The Wednesday Game (S4:E7)	Terry Michaels
Medical Center	1972	Gladiator (S4:E12)	Don
Emergency!	1972	Musical Mania (S2:E11)	Boyd Clements
Adam-12	1972	Hot Spell (S5:E12)	Jerry Bannerman
The Screaming Woman	1972	(TV movie)	Harry Sands²
Banacek	1972	Detour to Nowhere (S1:E10)	Earl Lewis²
Ironside	1973	House of Terror (S7:E6)	Dave Warren
Owen Marshall, Counselor at Law	1973	Final Semester (S2:E22)	Barry Meadows
Gunsmoke	1973	The Deadly Innocent (S19:E13)	Billy
Kojak	1974	Mojo (S1:E20)	Marty
Hec Ramsey	1974	Dead Heat (S1:E8)	Neil Munson
Gunsmoke	1974	A Town In Chains (S20:E2)	Pryor
Get Christie Love	1974	Emperor Of Death Street (S1:E3)	cowboy
Petrocelli	1974	A Very Lonely Lady (S1:E10)	Albert Deigh
Adam-12	1975	Lady's Night (S7:E16)	Andrews
Harry O	1976	Book Of Changes (S2:E15)	Peter Wesler
Police Story	1978	River of Promises (S5:E3)	Tack
Pearl (miniseries)	1978	Parts 1-3	soldier
Project UFO	1979	Sighting 4024: The Scoutmaster Incident (S2:E10)	Andy McMurtry
How The West Was Won	1979	Luke (S3:E9)	Alan Thompson
Buck Rogers In The 25th Century	1981	The Golden Man (S2:E5)	Relcos
Bret Maverick	1981	Anything For A Friend (S1:E3)	Doc Vetter

¹As Russell Garland Wiggins
²As Russell C Wiggins

=== Films ===
Movie appearances by Russell Wiggins
Movie	Year	Role	Comments
Limbo	1972	Alan Weber	Love interest for Kate Jackson's character
Nightfall	1988	Zol	as Russell Garland Wiggins
