= List of Big Wolf on Campus episodes =

The following is a list of episodes from the television series, Big Wolf on Campus. During the course of the series, 65 episodes of Big Wolf on Campus aired over three seasons, between April 2, 1999, and April 7, 2002.

== Series overview ==
Season	Episodes	Originally released	
Season	Episodes	First released	Last released
1	22	April 2, 1999	September 24, 1999
2	22	March 18, 2000	October 7, 2000
3	21	October 26, 2001	April 7, 2002

== Episodes ==
=== Season 1 (1999) ===
No. overall	No. in season	Title	Directed by	Written by	Original release date
1	1	"Pilot"	Peter Svatek	Peter Knight & Christopher Briggs	April 2, 1999
On an annual camp out with some friends the weekend before his senior year, Tommy Dawkins is attacked by a wolf. Little does he know that the wolf that attacked him is in reality a werewolf and that night is going to change his life forever.
2	2	"The Bookmobile"	Carl Goldstein	Gregory Thompson & Aron Abrams	April 9, 1999
Once every 70 years, a window of transference opens that offers Tommy a chance to pass his curse to another person. Merton volunteers, but that same day a bookmobile shows up in Pleasantville and people start disappearing.
3	3	"Butch Comes to Shove"	Érik Canuel	Dan Kopelman	16 April 1999
When a character from a 1950s educational film gets sick of the rules, he decides to leave the movie for Pleasantville. While there, Butch decides to find someone to bring back to his black-and-white world--and Stacey is at the top of his list.
4	4	"Cat Woman"	Peter Svatek	Michael MacKenzie	30 April 1999
An exotic new foreign exchange student, Carole LeFevre, begins attending Pleasantville High. Tommy thinks that she has a certain Je ne sais quoi but he fails to realize quite how much they have in common. Stacey finds herself jealous of Carole and Tommy's chemistry.
5	5	"Witch College"	Érik Canuel	Dana Reston	7 May 1999
A college sorority has their eyes set on Stacey and Tommy could not be happier until she starts acting like a real "witch". Merton is convinced that they are sorority cyborgs but he's a bit off the mark.
6	6	"The Pleasantville Strangler"	Érik Canuel	Michael Shipley & Jim Bernstein	14 May 1999
The actions of Hugo and Merton inadvertently release the Pleasantville Strangler, a long-dead serial killer whose spirit is able to body-hop, and he's gunning for Tommy.
7	7	"Stage Fright"	Carl Goldstein	Rick Nyholm	May 21, 1999
A crazed cable man named Santini visits Pleasantville, and transports those who use pirated cable into the TV shows they watch.
8	8	"That Swamp Thing You Do"	Carl Goldstein	Kirk Savell	28 May 1999
Twenty-five years ago, a hippie teacher fell into a toxic swamp, and mutated into a monster. Now, he's back, searching for his old fiancée.
9	9	"Muffy the Werewolf Slayer"	Peter Svatek	Jim Bernstein & Michael Shipley	June 4, 1999
When a new girl, Vesper, starts to leech information from Merton on who the Pleasantville Werewolf is, Tommy must also deal with a soul-sucking door-to-door salesman.
10	10	"Stalk Like An Egyptian"	Peter Svatek	Jonathan Goldstein	June 11, 1999
When Tommy and Merton unknowingly resurrect an old mummy on a school field-trip, the dead mummy becomes a teenage boy, and is out to make Stacey his queen, forever...
11	11	"Flugelhoff!"	Mark Jean	Dan Kopelman	18 June 1999
A lycanthropist called Flugelhoff arrives in Pleasantville claiming that he can cure Tommy of his curse.
12	12	"Invisible Merton"	Jimmy Kaufman	Joseph Mallozzi & Paul Mullie	25 June 1999
Merton's old nemesis, Alistair Black, comes to Pleasantville, not only taking over Merton's role as president of the Gothic Fantasy Guild, but also casting a spell on Merton, rendering him invisible. Meanwhile, Tommy has to deal with a psychiatrist.
13	13	"The Wolf is Out There"	Mark Soulard	Jeff Rothpan	2 July 1999
Tommy's wolfish side begins to influence his appetite, and the fried chicken he devours to satisfy it begins to influence his waistline. But Tommy's battle of the bulge is nothing compared to the war on the Pleasantville Werewolf, and when the mayor offers a huge cash reward for his capture, Tim and Travis lead a group determined to hunt the beast.
14	14	"Interview with a Werewolf"	Mark Jean	David Hamburg & Mitchell Goldsmith	9 July 1999
A florist sets Merton up on a date with her niece. However, the florist does not have a niece, and when Merton unknowingly goes out with the florist, she sucks the life out of him, turning him into an old man.
15	15	"Fangs for the Memories"	Peter Svatek	Peter Knight & Christopher Briggs	23 July 1999
Tommy decides to donate blood, but he and Merton must retrieve it from the blood bank after learning that his werewolf curse can be transferred by blood. But the problem becomes more complicated when they must deal with a group of vampires who raid blood banks.
16	16	"Time and Again"	Jimmy Kaufman	Michael Shipley & Jim Bernstein	30 July 1999
A chronomancer gives Merton a watch that can reverse time. Merton is thrilled to have the chance to reverse his mistakes, but it turns out that each use of the watch drains some of his intelligence. Tommy has to find a way to save Merton before he becomes a complete moron.
17	17	"Big Bad Wolf"	Adam Weissman	Michael Shipley & Jim Bernstein	6 August 1999
Tommy's life is in jeopardy when he and Merton speak an Indian chant that unknowingly brings Tommy's dark side to life.
18	18	"Scary Terri"	Adam Weissman	Ari Posner	13 August 1999
Tommy is in the crosshairs of a psychic young outcast named Terri after she mistakes his friendship for affection, and then sees him with Stacey.
19	19	"Hair Today, Gone Tomorrow"	Peter Svatek	Mark Torgove & Paul Kaplan	20 August 1999
A new substitute teacher claims to be the werewolf that bit Tommy. While Tommy looks up to Mr. Dunleavy, Mr. Dunleavy tries to bring out the bad side of Tommy.
20	20	"The Exor-Sis"	Peter Svatek	Rick Parks & Scott Jackson	27 August 1999
Merton's sister, Becky, has been assigned a locker that opens a portal to the netherworld.
21	21	"Don't Fear the Reaper"	Peter D. Marshall	Rick Nyholm	3 September 1999
Tommy saves a man from the Grim Reaper, and the Reaper now has his sights on Tommy.
22	22	"Game Over"	Érik Canuel	Sam Wendel	September 24, 1999
Tommy breaks the high score on an arcade game that mysteriously freezes as he reaches the next level. This serves to release the game's antagonist, Dirk Strykem, who has decided to destroy Tommy and Merton.

=== Season 2 (2000) ===
No. overall	No. in season	Title	Directed by	Written by	Original release date
23	1	"Hello Nasty"	Jimmy Kaufman	Peter Knight	18 March 2000
Tommy, Merton, and their new companion, Lori, find themselves battling against the ghost of a football player who is behind the football team's 61-year-old curse.
24	2	"Frank Stein"	Mark Jean	Robert L. Baird & Kelly Senecal	25 March 2000
While participating in a quiz bowl, Merton is interviewed by a strange man, who wants to take Merton's brain and use it inside his creation.
25	3	"Commie Dawkins"	Jimmy Kaufman	Michael Bornhorst	1 April 2000
When Tommy and Merton enter a wormhole that lets them travel through time, a Russian man enters and changes the outcome of the Cold War, which leads to the collapse of the United States and worldwide enforcement of communism. Meanwhile, Tommy must decide whether or not to warn his past self of the werewolf attack that will change his life.
26	4	"The Girl Who Spied Wolf"	Jim Beaudin	Robert L. Baird & Kelly Senecal	8 April 2000
At the same time that Lori discovers Tommy's true identity, a group of werewolves called the Evil Werewolf Syndicate decides to force Tommy to join them.
27	5	"Apocalypse Soon"	Mark Jean	David Feeney & Brian Gewirtz	15 April 2000
A traveling pro-wrestler named Dr. Apocalypse comes to town. He has racked up 665 wins--but the six hundred and sixty-sixth could cause the end of the world. To save the universe, Tommy, Merton, and Lori have to prevent Dr. Apocalypse's next victory.
28	6	"The Sandman Cometh"	Jean Beaudin	Arnold Rudnick & Rich Hosek	22 April 2000
Tommy and Merton are put up against the villainous Sandman, who enslaves sleeping people in an attempt to get them to touch a special sand that will put them to sleep forever.
29	7	"The Geek Shall Inherit the Earth"	Larry McLean	David Feeney & Brian Gewirtz	6 May 2000
Tommy and Merton defeat who they believe is a demon trying to attack an innocent teenager, only to learn that the demon is a demon hunter and the innocent teenager is a demon.
30	8	"Imaginary Fiend"	Larry McLean	Paul Mullie & Joseph Mallozzi	13 May 2000
While donating items to a toy drive, Merton and Tommy unwittingly release Merton's old imaginary friend, Vince, from Merton's old toy chest. Merton doesn't want an imaginary friend anymore, causing Vince to set out to destroy the Pleasantville Trio.
31	9	"101 Damnations"	Jimmy Kaufman	Paul Mullie & Joseph Mallozzi	20 May 2000
Tommy finds a stray puppy and is then found by Tim and Travis, who are still hunting for the Pleasantville Werewolf. While dealing with that, Tommy fails to realize that his new puppy is Cerebrus, the three-headed hound of Hades.
32	10	"Mind Over Merton"	Jimmy Kaufman	Barry Julien	3 June 2000
Merton creates an intelligence potion after a MENSA-like society for geniuses rejects him, but Tim and Travis soon get their hands on the potion and become smart enough to figure out who the Pleasantville Werewolf is.
33	11	"Blame It on the Haim"	Peter D. Marshall	David Wolkove & Sandy Brown	10 June 2000
Corey Haim (as himself) comes to town to shoot a made-for-video vampire film, but the Pleasantville Trio soon comes to believe Corey himself is a real vampire...
34	12	"Pleased to Eat You"	Peter D. Marshall	Jonathan Goldstein	17 June 2000
When Tommy stops hanging out with Merton in an attempt to win the title of Homecoming King, a group of black-clad teenagers take a liking to the lonely Goth, and offer him a place in their gang. But when they give Merton a nectar that makes him balloon to an obese size, Lori and Tommy realize that the teens' interest in Merton is more like a hunger...
35	13	"The Manchurian Werewolf: Part 1"	Érik Canuel	Robert L. Baird	15 July 2000
Part one of two. Tommy is brainwashed by the returned Evil Werewolf Syndicate and their pizzas, and our mind-controlled werewolf soon bites Lori.
36	14	"Manchu: Part Deux"	Érik Canuel	Robert L. Baird	22 July 2000
Conclusion. Tommy and Merton must find a way to inject Lori with wolfsbane before the full moon, or she'll be a werewolf forever.
37	15	"Mr. Roboto"	Carl Goldstein	Story by : Pang-Ni Landrum & Maggie Bandur; Teleplay by : Matthew Salsberg	29 July 2000
A cyborg disguised as the new school guidance counselor begins to implant mind-controlling devices into the brains of the Pleasantville High students.
38	16	"Rob: Zombie"	Carl Goldstein	Michael Benson & Marc Abrams	5 August 2000
Lori tricks Merton into reviving her dead boyfriend Rob, at the same time Tommy copes with Lori breaking up with him.
39	17	"Fear and Loathing in Pleasantville"	Jimmy Kaufman	Michael Shipley & Jim Bernstein	19 August 2000
A demon that feeds on horror visits Pleasantville, putting its residents into frightening scenarios until they die of shock.
40	18	"Faltered States"	Jimmy Kaufman	Michael Benson & Marc Abrams	26 August 2000
To impress a girl at school, Merton gets a job as a test-subject at a laboratory, which has some literally ugly consequences when Merton is turned into a caveman through sensory deprivation and strange chemical injections.
41	19	"Butch is Back"	Mark Jean	Dan Kopelman	2 September 2000
Lori finds herself in a theatrical prison as Merton unwittingly releases Butch again while watching another film.
42	20	"Voodoo Child"	Mark Jean	Michael Benson & Marc Abrams	8 September 2000
The new school nurse St. Jacques, noticing Merton's supernatural knowledge and darker qualities, offers to let him become a voodoo apprentice.
43	21	"She Will, She Will Rock You"	Adam Weissman	Barry Julien & Mathew Salsberg	9 September 2000
Merton finds himself frozen in stone by a transfer student who is actually Medusa.
44	22	"Clip Show: The Kiss of Death"	Adam Weissman	Peter Knight	7 October 2000
Death returns to capture Tommy, but in a last attempt to save him, Tommy, Merton and Lori go over all the good things the group has done over the past two seasons.

=== Season 3 (2001–02) ===
No. overall	No. in season	Title	Directed by	Written by	Original release date
45	1	"Stone Free"	Daniel Grou	Robert L. Baird	October 26, 2001
Tommy and Lori must save Merton who had become a stone golem, but the spell to revert Merton to normal makes him weak and blind.
46	2	"Everybody Fang Chung Tonight"	Daniel Grou	Christopher Briggs	November 2, 2001
Merton hosts a radio show that attracts a young vampire who falls in love with Merton. Unfortunately, she and her fellow vampire feed on werewolf blood.
47	3	"I Dream of Becky"	Érik Canuel	Beth Seriff & Geoff Tarson	November 9, 2001
When Becky unwittingly releases a genie from a lamp, he agrees to grant her three wishes. Little does Becky know that those wishes don't come for free.
48	4	"Stormy Weather"	Érik Canuel	Marc Abrams & Michael Benson	November 16, 2001
Merton creates a superhero club, but his first candidate's talents do not impress Tommy and Lori who are suspicious of his intentions.
49	5	"Hellection"	Carl Goldstein	Lars Guignard	November 23, 2001
Tommy loses the class president election to a girl named Hillary, who made a deal with a demonic teacher to win.
50	6	"Being Tommy Dawkins"	Carl Goldstein	Matthew Salsberg	November 30, 2001
While trying to escape from an ex-convict who wants him dead, Merton finds a portal which allows him to enter Tommy's body.
51	7	"Save the Last Trance"	Érik Canuel	Ron Nelson	December 7, 2001
Merton has a new girlfriend who happens to be a witch.
52	8	"Anti-Claus is Coming to Town"	Érik Canuel	Rick Nyholm	December 14, 2001
Tommy, Merton and Lori must help Santa Claus defeat an evil impersonator out to ruin Christmas.
53	9	"N'Sipid"	Carl Goldstein	Barry Julien	January 11, 2002
Becky is kidnapped by aliens posing as a bubblegum pop boy band.
54	10	"Very Pale Rider"	Carl Goldstein	Barry Julien	January 18, 2002
Merton is transported into SerpenQuest, his favorite role-playing game.
55	11	"Play it Again, Samurai"	Daniel Grou	Barry Julien	January 25, 2002
Merton falls in love with a 900-year-old Japanese princess who has been cursed by a jealous samurai. Meanwhile, Tommy is ordered to do community service at the Hungry Bucket.
56	12	"Dances Without Wolves"	Daniel Grou	Barry Julien	February 1, 2002
Tommy's wish to be normal is finally granted when he ends up in a parallel timeline where he hurt his knee and never became a werewolf. Because of this, Chuck, Tommy's rival, replaced him and became an evil werewolf. Tommy must defeat him, without his powers, but this won't be easy as Merton and Lori do not recognize him.
57	13	"Baby on Board"	Érik Canuel	Robert L. Baird & Dan Gerson	February 10, 2002
Merton is impregnated by an alien.
58	14	"The Boy Who Tried Wolf"	Érik Canuel	Louis Pearson	February 17, 2002
A werewolf hunter comes to town. At the same time, Tommy accidentally bites Merton who becomes an eventually evil werewolf.
59	15	"The Mertonator"	Mark Jean	Michael Shipley & Jim Bernstein	February 24, 2002
Tommy is pursued by a killer cyborg from the future who looks like Merton.
60	16	"What's Vlud Got to Do with It?"	Mark Jean	Christopher Briggs	March 3, 2002
The princess of Lycanthea, a tropical island kingdom of werewolves, falls in love with Tommy.
61	17	"There's Something About Lori"	Adam Weissman	Barry Julien	March 10, 2002
A mysterious figure known as The Phantom of the Factory mistakes Lori for his beloved who perished over seventy years ago.
62	18	"Switch Me Baby One More Time"	Adam Weissman	Matthew Salsberg	March 17, 2002
Lori swaps her body with a girl who is jealous of her.
63	19	"What's the Story, Morning Corey"	Érik Canuel	Christopher Briggs	March 24, 2002
Corey Feldman, who was a good friend of Corey Haim (who Tommy destroyed in the second season to save Lori) visits Pleasantville.
64	20	"Thanks"	Érik Canuel	Christopher Briggs & Peter Knight	March 31, 2002
Tommy and Merton end up in a very deadly situation with the same girl as they prepare to leave for college.
65	21	"A Clip Show: The Sum of All Fears"	Érik Canuel	Matthew Salsberg	April 7, 2002
Another clip show episode.
