= Martha Smith =

American model and actress (born 1952)

- Born: Martha Anne Smith; October 16, 1952 (age 74); Cleveland, Ohio, U.S.
- Education: Michigan State University
- Occupations: Actress; model; real estate broker
- Years active: 1973–present
- Spouses: Noel Blanc (m. 1977; div. 1986) Keith England (m. 2000)

Martha Anne Smith (born October 16, 1952) is an American actress, television personality, real estate broker, and former model, probably best-known for her role as Barbara "Babs" Jansen in the comedy film National Lampoon's Animal House (1978).

== Early life and education ==
Smith was born on October 16, 1952, in Cleveland, Ohio, and raised in Farmington, Michigan. She was an honor student and received recognition in "Who's Who of American Students."

At age 17, Smith enrolled at Michigan State University to study psychology. Her older sister was already working as a model with a Detroit agency. When Smith needed credentials for a trip showing clothing in Mexico, she contacted the same agency and was signed immediately. She became an in-demand model whose travel demands eventually forced her to abandon her university studies.

According to her July 1973 Playboy biography, Smith harboured ambitions beyond modelling: "My dream is to do it all, write the script, direct, be totally involved with the production of a film." At age 20, she was already shooting 16mm documentaries around Detroit and writing script outlines.

== Career ==
=== Modeling ===
In July 1973, Smith was selected as Playboy magazine's Playmate of the Month at age 20. Her centerfold feature was photographed by Pompeo Posar. The accompanying bio revealed her aspirations to become a filmmaker, stating she was already producing small films in Detroit and considering film school in California.

The photo shoots and press junkets led Smith to California and the Universal Studios Contract Department, where she began studying acting under the mentorship of actress Beverly Garland.

=== Television ===
Smith began her career acting in television commercials. In 1976, she had small roles in several television series, including Quincy, M.E.; Charlie's Angels; Happy Days; and Taxi.

As a television actress, Smith is best known for her role as Agent Francine Desmond, part of the regular cast on the CBS adventure series Scarecrow and Mrs. King. She appeared in all four seasons from 1983 to 1987, alongside Kate Jackson and Bruce Boxleitner. In 1982, she was cast as Sandy Horton on the NBC soap opera series Days of Our Lives.

Smith also guest-starred as Walt Driscoll's wife on Dallas, and as Swamp Thing's wife (Linda Holland) on the 1990 series Swamp Thing, from DC Comics.

Smith had guest appearances on several 1980s and 1990s American television game shows, including The $25,000 Pyramid, The $100,000 Pyramid with Dick Clark, Super Password, Celebrity Hot Potato, Body Language, and The New Hollywood Squares.

=== Motion pictures ===
Smith's first acting role in a feature-length film was in National Lampoon's Animal House, directed by John Landis and released in 1978, as sorority girl Barbara "Babs" Jansen. According to Smith, she had auditioned for a series regular role on General Hospital the same week and made it to the screen test, but forgot her lines. "I was devastated," she recalled in a 2008 interview. "It meant I would have to do that silly college comedy Animal House instead of General Hospital. Which, of course, would never amount to anything."

During filming in Eugene, Oregon from October to December 1977, director Landis maintained high energy on set and sent postcards to the cast's motel mailboxes announcing "We are making a classic movie!" The film became a massive commercial success, earning $141.6 million on a $3 million budget—a 47-fold return on investment. It was the second-highest grossing film of 1978 (after Grease) and the highest-grossing comedy of the 1970s decade.

In 2008, Smith recalled her experience working on the comedy classic: "Having just returned from the Chicago reunion event at Hollywood Boulevard, I can say it's never ceased to astonish me just how deeply this movie has carved itself into the American psyche. It's hard to know which is more impressive: the AFI Top 100 Funniest Films List, the induction into the Library of Congress National Film Registry or my personal favorite accolade – the parody issue of Mad Magazine."

After the turn of the 21st century, Smith's acting appearances became more sporadic. Among her later film appearances were in the 2006 film Loveless in Los Angeles, a romantic comedy movie that took place behind the scenes of a reality dating show, and a featured role, that of Kitty Carloff, in the 2009 film The Seduction of Dr. Fugazzi, which also starred Faye Dunaway.

In 2018, forty years after Animal House, Smith reprised her role as Babs Jansen in the Netflix biographical film A Futile and Stupid Gesture (about National Lampoon co-founder Doug Kenney), appearing as a Universal Studios tour guide—a meta-reference to her character's ending in the original film. That same year, she appeared at the TCM Classic Film Festival on April 29 for the Animal House 40th anniversary reunion panel alongside director John Landis and cast members.

=== Real estate career ===
Smith began a real estate career in 1995 and became a full-time real estate broker/agent for Keller Williams Realty, serving a select, high-end clientele, largely in the Beverly Hills and Hollywood Hills areas. She has operated as an exclusive, service-oriented boutique-style real estate service agent within the broader framework of the Keller Williams branded environment.

Smith appeared on the HGTV real estate television series Selling LA one of Keller Williams's brokers. The third episode of the first season described her as having "an A-list Rolodex of busy clients, including legendary drummer Matt Sorum, former member of the hard rock band Guns N' Roses and member of the supergroup Velvet Revolver".

Her professional recognitions include the Gold Circle Award for Top Production and Keller Williams Agent of the Month (2011), Platinum Award for Top Production placing in the Top 15 out of approximately 350 agents (2012), and Global Realtor designation with IRES (2012). In 2023, she was ranked #3 Top Sales Agent of the Month in March and #9 Top Closed Volume Individual Agent out of over 700 agents for the year. As of 2025, at age 73, she remains active in the Los Angeles real estate market.

== Personal life ==
Smith was raised in Farmington, Michigan, and attended Michigan State University, where she acquired fluency in French and Italian.

Smith has been married twice. Her first marriage was to Noel Blanc, son of legendary voice actor Mel Blanc, on May 15, 1977. The marriage lasted nine years, ending in divorce in 1986.

On May 7, 2000, Smith married musician Keith England, formerly of The Allman Brothers Band, Montrose, and The Tubes. They met while performing together in a cabaret act in 1999. The couple resides in Beverly Hills, California and, as of 2025, have been married for 25 years. Smith has no children from either marriage.

Miki Garcia	Cyndi Wood	Bonnie Large	Julie Woodson	Anulka Dziubinska	Ruthy Ross
Martha Smith	Phyllis Coleman	Geri Glass	Valerie Lane	Monica Tidwell	Christine Maddox
