= List of Scarecrow and Mrs. King episodes =

The episodes of the American television series Scarecrow and Mrs. King premiered on CBS October 3, 1983 where it ran for four seasons and 88 episodes until its conclusion on May 28, 1987. The series follows the working relationship and eventual romance between housewife Amanda King (Kate Jackson) and top secret agent Lee Stetson (Bruce Boxleitner), codenamed "Scarecrow".

== Series overview ==
| Season | Episodes | Originally released | |
| Season | Episodes | First released | Last released |
|---|---|---|---|
| 1 | 21 | October 3, 1983 | May 7, 1984 |
| 2 | 23 | October 1, 1984 | May 13, 1985 |
| 3 | 22 | September 23, 1985 | May 12, 1986 |
| 4 | 22 | September 19, 1986 | May 28, 1987 |

== Episodes ==
=== Season 1 (1983–84) ===
| No. overall | No. in season | Title | Directed by | Written by | Original release date |
|---|---|---|---|---|---|
| 1 | 1 | "The First Time" | Rod Holcomb | Eugenie Ross-Leming and Brad Buckner | October 3, 1983 |
Divorced suburban mom Amanda King is given a package at a train station and told to hand it to the man in the red hat. Boarding the train, she finds a car filled with men in red fezzes, so she takes the box home. With this chance meeting she becomes involved with the handsome operative Lee Stetson, codenamed "Scarecrow", and the secret U.S. agency he works for.
| 2 | 2 | "There Goes the Neighborhood" | Rod Holcomb | Eugenie Ross-Leming and Brad Buckner | October 10, 1983 |
Lee and Amanda pose as a married suburban couple in order to investigate an international arms smuggling ring.
| 3 | 3 | "If Thoughts Could Kill" | James Frawley | Eugenie Ross-Leming and Brad Buckner | October 17, 1983 |
In a hospital for a routine physical, Lee is slowly brainwashed by a former Agency physician.
| 4 | 4 | "Magic Bus" | Mike Vejar | Eugenie Ross-Leming and Brad Buckner | October 24, 1983 |
After a specially designed RV is stolen, Lee and Amanda try to infiltrate the survivalist group responsible for the theft.
| 5 | 5 | "The ACM Kid" | John Llewellyn Moxey | Gregory S. Dinallo | October 31, 1983 |
The Agency must protect a 12-year-old computer whiz from Soviet agents.
| 6 | 6 | "Always Look a Gift Horse in the Mouth" | Corey Allen | Peter Lefcourt | November 7, 1983 |
When a visiting royal couple from the Middle East is targeted by assassins, Lee has to guard the husband and Amanda is asked to befriend the wife.
| 7 | 7 | "Service Above and Beyond" | James Frawley | Peter Lefcourt | November 14, 1983 |
Amanda poses as a wealthy jet-setter to attract the attention of a fast food chain owner who may be selling military secrets to the Soviets.
| 8 | 8 | "Saved by the Bells" | Winrich Kolbe | Joel Steiger and Stu Kreisman | November 28, 1983 |
Enemy agents targeting Lee accidentally kidnap Amanda in his place, demanding the release of their agent in return for Amanda.
| 9 | 9 | "Sudden Death" | Nicholas Sgarro | Tom Sawyer and Del Reisman | December 5, 1983 |
Lee and Amanda pose as a football player and a sports writer to prevent a football team owner from assassinating a foreign leader.
| 10 | 10 | "The Long Christmas Eve" | James Frawley | Peter Lefcourt | December 19, 1983 |
On Christmas Eve, Amanda is asked to pretend to be the long lost daughter of a turncoat to try and convince him to stay with the US. But the man in question is sought by two trained KGB thugs and they get trapped in the turncoat's cabin.
| 11 | 11 | "Remembrance of Things Past" | Sigmund Neufeld, Jr. | Eugenie Ross-Leming and Brad Buckner | January 9, 1984 |
After several agents are murdered and Lee is marked as the next victim, he fakes his death to track down the killer- and only Amanda and Billy know the truth.
| 12 | 12 | "Lost and Found" | James Frawley | Eugenie Ross-Leming and Brad Buckner | January 16, 1984 |
Helping a defecting ESP expert brings Lee in contact with the expert's wife, Lee's former love interest.
| 13 | 13 | "I Am Not Now, Nor Have I Ever Been... a Spy" | Nicholas Sgarro | Peter Lefcourt | January 30, 1984 |
A case of amnesia causes Amanda to forget vital information about terrorists.
| 14 | 14 | "Dead Ringer" | William Wiard | Juanita Bartlett | February 6, 1984 |
Amanda agrees to help the Agency with a defecting Hungarian, who looks exactly like Francine.
| 15 | 15 | "The Mole" | Russ Mayberry | Cliff Gould | February 13, 1984 |
After failing repeatedly to catch a Bulgarian spy, Lee and Amanda are enlisted by "Blue Leader" to rule out a possible mole inside the Agency.
| 16 | 16 | "Savior" | William Wiard | Marshall Goldberg | February 27, 1984 |
Lee appears to have left the Agency to work for an arms smuggler, who is trying to steal the latest top-secret US missile.
| 17 | 17 | "The Artful Dodger" | Christian I. Nyby, II | Pamela Chais | March 5, 1984 |
An international jewel thief is breaking into military bases and stealing plans for the missile defense system, and Amanda is his unwitting accomplice.
| 18 | 18 | "Filming Raul" | Oz Scott | Rudolph Borchert | March 19, 1984 |
A parking lot attendant films an attempted kidnapping on an Agency courier, which puts him in the targets of enemy agents.
| 19 | 19 | "Fearless Dotty" | Christian I. Nyby, II | Timothy Burns | March 26, 1984 |
When at a used bookstore Dotty accidentally receives a book containing military secrets which turns her into the target of agents trying to get it back.
| 20 | 20 | "Weekend" | Cliff Bole | Rudolph Borchert | April 23, 1984 |
Lee and Amanda pose as newlyweds at a posh resort to prevent a kidnapping.
| 21 | 21 | "Waiting for Godorsky" | William Wiard | Rudolph Borchert | May 7, 1984 |
Amanda befriends a kind, elderly lady - who turns out to be a very important Russian Princess targeted by assassins before she can testify in front of a Congressional panel.

=== Season 2 (1984–85) ===
| No. overall | No. in season | Title | Directed by | Written by | Original release date |
|---|---|---|---|---|---|
| 22 | 1 | "To Catch a Mongoose" | Rod Holcomb | S : Rudolph Borchert; T : Mark Lisson, Bill Froehlich and Stephen Hattman | October 1, 1984 |
Amanda is brought to London to identify an old high school classmate the Agency believes is The Mongoose, a Carlos-type killer.
| 23 | 2 | "The Times They Are a Changin'" | William Wiard | Mark Lisson and Bill Froehlich | October 8, 1984 |
Lee and Amanda must procure the safe return of a sixties radical, now hooked up with terrorists in Munich, and stop the assassination of an unidentified top American.
| 24 | 3 | "Double Agent" | John Patterson | Robert Bielak | October 15, 1984 |
An disgruntled ex-spy turned writer threatens to expose U.S. agents, including Amanda, in a tell-all book.
| 25 | 4 | "The Legend of Das Geisterschloss" | Cliff Bole | Stephen Hattman | October 22, 1984 |
In Austria, Lee and Amanda must save the life of an important English agent (Jean Stapleton) and break up a top secret eavesdropping post which has been stealing secrets from Western allies.
| 26 | 5 | "Charity Begins at Home" | Cliff Bole | Rudolph Borchert and Marshall Goldberg | October 29, 1984 |
Lee and Amanda uncover a scheme to sell a secret formula that would control the price and supply of crops, enabling the owner of the formula to reap vast profits on speculation.
| 27 | 6 | "Brunettes Are In" | Christian I. Nyby II | Bill Froelich and Mark Lisson | November 12, 1984 |
Amanda is kidnapped by a white-slavery operation while she's on a courier assignment for Lee and the agency.
| 28 | 7 | "Our Man in Tegernsee" | William Wiard | Juanita Bartlett | November 19, 1984 |
When Amanda is arrested in Germany for passing bogus currency, Lee pursues the counterfeiters with the help of a disgruntled local agent.
| 29 | 8 | "Affair at Bromfield Hall" | William Wiard | Juanita Bartlett | November 26, 1984 |
When Lee and Amanda go to London to investigate a major security leak Amanda is drawn into a sex scandal designed to lure Lee to his death.
| 30 | 9 | "A Class Act" | Richard Compton | Shel Willens | December 3, 1984 |
Lee poses as a new recruit while Amanda gets some official Agency training at a week-long Station One session, which unmasks an Eastern bloc assassin who is out to kill her.
| 31 | 10 | "Playing Possum" | Paul Krasny | Rudolph Borchert | December 10, 1984 |
When a breach of security shuts down the Agency, Lee and Amanda pair up with a top Soviet agent to thwart a crazed Russian's attempt to set off a nuclear bomb in Washington, D.C.
| 32 | 11 | "The Three Faces of Emily" | Ivan Dixon | Stephen Hattman | December 31, 1984 |
British agent Lady Emily Farnsworth (Jean Stapleton) helps Lee nab a man responsible for selling stolen secret plans for a futuristic fighter plane developed by the two countries.
| 33 | 12 | "Ship of Spies" | Michael Hiatt | Robert Bielak | January 7, 1985 |
When Lee and Amanda go on a cruise and pose as an engaged couple to investigate the disappearance of an informant, they discover a plot to smuggle gold and fund a revolution. Nominated for Emmy Outstanding Achievement in Costuming for a Series
| 34 | 13 | "Spiderweb" | Harry Harris | S : March Kessler; T : Juanita Bartlett and Stephen Hattman | January 14, 1985 |
An ultra-secret operation to deliver and debrief three important Communist defectors is jeopardized by a security leak within the Agency that points squarely toward Amanda.
| 35 | 14 | "A Little Sex, a Little Scandal" | Vincent McEveety | Mark Lisson and Bill Froehlich | February 4, 1985 |
Amanda's candidacy for Arlington Mother of the Year is complicated when she witnesses the murder of a congressional aide involved in a call girl/blackmail ring.
| 36 | 15 | "A Relative Situation" | Bob Sweeney | Joan Brooker and Nancy Eddo | February 11, 1985 |
Amanda and Lee help the uncle who raised him by uncovering an Air Force officer conspiring to sell top-secret military equipment to an enemy power.
| 37 | 16 | "Life of the Party" | Will Mackenzie | Stephen Hattman | February 18, 1985 |
Amanda and Francine pose as maids to help Lee in the daring capture of a crime syndicate kingpin and some shakedown artists.
| 38 | 17 | "Odds on a Dead Pigeon" | Bob Sweeney | Juanita Bartlett | February 25, 1985 |
In order to kill Lee, a ruthless killer becomes Amanda's look-alike.
| 39 | 18 | "Car Wars" | Alf Kjellin | Stephen Hattman and Steve Feke | March 11, 1985 |
While her car is in the shop, Amanda borrows one from the Agency impound lot and inadvertently becomes the target of a deadly international syndicate.
| 40 | 19 | "DOA: Delirious on Arrival" | Winrich Kolbe | S : Nelson Costello; T : Robert Bielak | March 18, 1985 |
Amanda ingests a mysterious drug intended for Lee and undergoes a startling transformation in which her personality becomes the opposite of her normal self. Nominated for Emmy Outstanding Cinematography for a Series.
| 41 | 20 | "You Only Die Twice" | Bruce Bilson | S : Gina Goldman; T : Stephen Hattman, Mark Lisson and Bill Froehlich | April 1, 1985 |
An agent in Washington mistakenly uses Amanda's identity during a sensitive investigation. When she is killed Amanda is declared dead, and proving she's alive could be fatal.
| 42 | 21 | "Burn Out" | Sigmund Neufeld Jr. | Lisa Seidman | April 8, 1985 |
Stress and overwork seem to have taken their toll on Lee, whose burnout removes him from field duty for a desk job -- and gets him involved with subversives who give him a deadly assignment: kill Amanda King.
| 43 | 22 | "Murder Between Friends" | Bob Sweeney | Mark Lisson and Bill Froehlich | May 6, 1985 |
Lee and Amanda save an East African leader from a hit squad.
| 44 | 23 | "Vigilante Mothers" | John Patterson | Rudolph Borchert | May 13, 1985 |
A newly formed environmental group from Amanda’s neighborhood inadvertently crosses paths with a suave criminal who plans to steal a deadly bio-weapon from the chemical lab where one of Amanda’s neighbors works.

=== Season 3 (1985–86) ===
| No. overall | No. in season | Title | Directed by | Written by | Original release date | Prod. code |
|---|---|---|---|---|---|---|
| 45 | 1 | "A Lovely Little Affair" | Harvey Laidman | Kathleen A. Shelley | September 23, 1985 | 185744 |
Amanda enjoys her assignment to follow a charming and distinguished art restorer (Ben Murphy), who is in Washington, DC, on special assignment.
| 46 | 2 | "We're Off to See the Wizard" | James Fargo | Whitney Wherrett Roberson | September 30, 1985 | 185743 |
A series of murders seem to point to Lee, who worked with -- or dated -- all of the victims. This episode won a 1986 Emmy Award for "Outstanding Achievement in Music Composition for a Series (Dramatic Underscore)"
| 47 | 3 | "Over the Limit" | Alan Cooke | Tom Ropelewski | October 7, 1985 | 185742 |
Amanda attempts to exonerate the female head of a political action group fighting for the rights of independent fishermen.
| 48 | 4 | "Tail of the Dancing Weasel" | Virgil W. Vogel | George Geiger | October 14, 1985 | 185745 |
After a valuable letter from President Eisenhower is stolen from State Department files, Amanda is asked to spy on Lee by a retired triple agent.
| 49 | 5 | "Welcome to America, Mr. Brand" | Winrich Kolbe | Robert W. Gilmer | October 21, 1985 | 185741 |
Amanda babysits a vacationing British accountant, a clumsy James Bond-wannabe who claims he has stumbled onto evidence that reveals the identity of a Soviet spy. Nominated for Emmy Outstanding Achievement in Costuming for a Series
| 50 | 6 | "Sour Grapes" | Winrich Kolbe | Lee Maddux | October 28, 1985 | 185746 |
Amanda and Lee investigate after three top-ranking government officials are found dead from heroin-laced wine.
| 51 | 7 | "Utopia Now" | Burt Brinckerhoff | Robert Bielak | November 4, 1985 | 185747 |
Amanda and Lee take to the backwoods of Virginia to spy on an outspoken tax protester who may have more than political reform on his agenda.
| 52 | 8 | "Reach for the Sky" | James Frawley | Ron Landry & Tom Biener | November 11, 1985 | 185748 |
When an old banker friend of Billy's is killed he leaves to investigate something called 'Cyclops', Lee and Amanda investigate, and Francine gets stressed doing Billy's job.
| 53 | 9 | "J. Edgar's Ghost" | Winrich Kolbe | David Brown | November 18, 1985 | 185749 |
A former agent who preys on lonely women to get access to classified government documents seems to have stumbled upon the famed secret files of the late FBI director J. Edgar Hoover.
| 54 | 10 | "Flight to Freedom" | James Fargo | Barry Gold | November 25, 1985 | 185750 |
Lee and Amanda must find and save a war correspondent who has evidence that can topple a Latin American dictator and ruin the career of an American ambassador.
| 55 | 11 | "The Wrong Way Home" | Winrich Kolbe & Harvey Laidman | George Geiger | December 2, 1985 | 185751 |
When Amanda's ex-husband comes back to DC he is accused of murdering the Estocian Prime Minister and Lee has to investigate.
| 56 | 12 | "Fast Food for Thought" | Ron Satlof | Robert W. Gilmer | December 16, 1985 | 185752 |
Posing as brother and sister, Amanda and Lee go undercover at a fast food chain to foil a poisoning plot.
| 57 | 13 | "One Bear Dances, One Bear Doesn't" | Sigmund Neufeld, Jr. | Whitney Wherrett Roberson | January 6, 1986 | 185753 |
Dotty (Beverly Garland) falls for a Russian scientist the Agency is hiding in Amanda's neighborhood.
| 58 | 14 | "Playing for Keeps" | Harvey Laidman | Lee Maddux | January 13, 1986 | 185754 |
Lee and Francine protect a spoiled tennis player whose VIP father is being threatened by Soviet agents.
| 59 | 15 | "The Pharaoh's Engineer" | Kate Jackson | Jaison Starkes | January 20, 1986 | 185755 |
Lee and Amanda deal with several disappearances at an Agency retirement home that may be linked to an old, highly classified mission.
| 60 | 16 | "The Triumvirate" | James Fargo | Robert Bielak | February 10, 1986 | 185756 |
Amanda accidentally receives the wrong Agency pay check -- this one is for a hired assassin.
| 61 | 17 | "The Eyes Have It" | Harvey Laidman | Lynne Kelsey | February 17, 1986 | 185757 |
After a car accident, a hospitalized Lee won't relax until his missing contact lens, which contains a valuable microdot, is found.
| 62 | 18 | "Wrong Number" | Burt Brinckerhoff | David Brown | March 3, 1986 | 185758 |
Francine is kidnapped in Kabul to force a trade for an American mathematician with a KGB doppelganger.
| 63 | 19 | "The Boy Who Could Be King" | Sidney Hayers | Lee Maddux & David Brown | March 10, 1986 | 185759 |
Lee and Amanda prevent two thugs from killing a trumpet-playing monarch whose kingdom includes a rare strategic metal.
| 64 | 20 | "Dead Men Leave No Trails" | Harvey Laidman | Whitney Wherrett Roberson | March 31, 1986 | 185760 |
When Amanda is involved in a fender bender she accidentally reveals a supposedly dead terrorist as living and preparing to strike at an Embassy gathering.
| 65 | 21 | "Three Little Spies" | Oz Scott | Tom Chehak | April 7, 1986 | 185761 |
Lee and Amanda work with rival Russian and Chinese agents to retrieve nine stolen nuclear detonators headed for Pakistan.
| 66 | 22 | "All the World's a Stage" | Sidney Hayers | Richard Raskind | May 12, 1986 | 185762 |
Lee and Amanda investigate a playwright who, in order to get his play "Parisian Intrigue" produced at a local theater, is being forced by the KGB to obtain classified information from his scientist girlfriend about a strategic US arms program.

=== Season 4 (1986–87) ===
| No. overall | No. in season | Title | Directed by | Written by | Original release date |
|---|---|---|---|---|---|
| 67 | 1 | "Stemwinder: Part 1" | Burt Brinckerhoff | Robert W. Gilmer and George Geiger | September 19, 1986 |
During highly tense war-games a vengeful Soviet spy brands Lee and Amanda as traitors, forcing them to become fugitives.
| 68 | 2 | "Stemwinder: Part 2" | Burt Brinckerhoff | Robert W. Gilmer and George Geiger | September 26, 1986 |
Lee and Amanda are in hiding, looking for Alexi and Sonja, while the Agency looks for them.
| 69 | 3 | "Unfinished Business" | Kate Jackson | Lynne Kelsey | October 3, 1986 |
Lee tries to learn the truth about his parents' mysterious past, and in the process uncovers a plot to assassinate a presidential candidate from a small country.
| 70 | 4 | "No Thanks for the Memory" | Harvey Laidman | Lee Maddux | October 10, 1986 |
A reluctant KGB agent with a gifted memory desperately wants to defect to the United States.
| 71 | 5 | "It's in the Water" | Harvey Laidman | Tom Chehak | October 17, 1986 |
Lee and Amanda must stop a hired assassin from poisoning the Washington, D.C. water supply.
| 72 | 6 | "Night Crawler" | Harvey Laidman | George Geiger | October 31, 1986 |
While captives of a vicious Middle Eastern terrorist--their death imminent--Lee proposes marriage to Amanda. But will she have time to answer him?
| 73 | 7 | "Billy's Lost Weekend" | Christopher Hibler | Tom Chehak | November 7, 1986 |
When Billy forgets an entire weekend early retirement seems like a very real possibility and insanity his only explanation.
| 74 | 8 | "Photo Finish" | Cliff Bole | David Brown | November 14, 1986 |
When an old photograph links her to a student protest, threatening her status at the Agency, Amanda and Lee set out to prove her innocence.
| 75 | 9 | "The Man Who Died Twice" | Sidney Hayers | Cynthia Benjamin | November 21, 1986 |
Lee and Amanda must solve a mystery if they are to save the lives of a Chinese trade envoy. On the personal side, they wonder if a life together would expose them to additional danger.
| 76 | 10 | "Need to Know" | Dennis C. Duckwall | Nancy Eddo and Joan Brooker | December 5, 1986 |
Amanda and Lee must stop a maniacal newspaper magnate who is using his considerable power as a ploy to destroy the nation's security.
| 77 | 11 | "Santa's Got a Brand New Bag" | Sidney Hayers | Lloyd Pye | December 19, 1986 |
A calm Christmas Eve turns deadly when a disgruntled toy maker, who believes much more than children's toys are being made at the company where he once worked, enlists Lee and Amanda's help.
| 78 | 12 | "Any Number Can Play" | Harvey Laidman | Lynne Kelsey | January 2, 1987 |
When Dotty (Beverly Garland) becomes enamored of a mysteriously debonair man, a bizarre interplay of murder and international intrigue ensues.
| 79 | 13 | "Promises to Keep" | Sidney Hayers | David Brown and Lynne Kelsey and Lee Maddux | January 9, 1987 |
Lee and Amanda's friend TP, the enigmatic smart guy, is accused of aiding drug lords, but the truth is much more complicated- and far more personal.
| 80 | 14 | "Rumors of My Death" | Burt Brinckerhoff | Tom Chehak | January 23, 1987 |
A skeleton identified as Lee Stetson is discovered in a demolished building, exposing a phoney passport ring.
| 81 | 15 | "Bad Timing" | Harry Mastrogeorge | Robert W. Gilmer | February 6, 1987 |
When the Russians inject Lee with a lethal drug that leaves him with just hours to live, he and Amanda must find the antidote before time runs out.
| 82 | 16 | "Do You Take This Spy?" | Burt Brinckerhoff | Robert W. Gilmer and Tom Chehak and George Geiger | February 13, 1987 |
A million dollar art heist and a murder get in the way of Amanda and Lee's wedding.
| 83 | 17 | "Mission of Gold" | Dennis C. Duckwall | Lynne Kelsey | February 20, 1987 |
Their honeymoon turns tragic when Amanda is critically shot in a battle over gold doubloons.
| 84 | 18 | "One Flew East" | Sigmund Neufeld | David Brown | February 27, 1987 |
The Agency is blamed for the kidnapping of a famous poet and vocal critic of the United States. Lee and Amanda are charged to find him and exonerate the Agency.
| 85 | 19 | "All That Glitters" | Sascha Schneider | D.C. Black | May 7, 1987 |
Lee investigates when priceless jewels, stolen along with a top-secret spy list during the invasion of Grenada, are among the birthday gifts given to his former girlfriend.
| 86 | 20 | "Suitable for Framing" | Harvey Laidman | Whitney Wherrett Roberson | May 14, 1987 |
Francine and Lee fall victim to a KGB plan to humiliate the Agency.
| 87 | 21 | "A Matter of Choice" | Burt Brinckerhoff | David Brown and Lynne Kelsey and Lee Maddux | May 21, 1987 |
When a prison escapee who murdered two Agency contacts resurfaces at the same time as Francine's former lover--who wants to rekindle their romance--Lee suspects duplicity and works to prove a link.
| 88 | 22 | "The Khrushchev List" | Oz Scott | Lee Maddux | May 28, 1987 |
