= Big Wolf on Campus =

Canadian TV series (1999–2002)

- Opening title
- Genre: Supernatural fiction Comedy; Superhero
- Created by: Peter A. Knight; Chris Briggs
- Starring: Brandon Quinn; Danny Smith; Rachelle Lefèvre; Aimée Castle
- Theme music composer: Danny Smith
- Opening theme: "Just a Phase" performed by Danny Smith
- Composers: James Gelfand (S1); Simon Carpentier (S2–3)
- Country of origin: Canada
- Original language: English
- No. of seasons: 3
- No. of episodes: 65 (list of episodes)

Production
- Executive producers: Robin Spry; Paul Painter (S1–2); Peter Pearson (S1–2); Michael Yudin (S1); Lance H. Robbins; Abbie Charette (S3); Jacques Pettigrew (S3); Marie Claude-Beauchamp (S3); Peter A. Knight
- Producer: Christian Gagne (S2–3)
- Cinematography: Louis de Ernsted (S1); John Dyer (S2–3)
- Running time: 22 minutes
- Production companies: Telescene (seasons 1–2); CinéGroupe (season 3); Saban Entertainment

Original release
- Network: YTV; Fox Family
- Release: April 2, 1999 – April 7, 2002

Big Wolf on Campus is a Canadian television series created by Peter A. Knight and Christopher Briggs that ran from 1999 to 2002. The central plot revolves around a teenage boy named Thomas "Tommy" P. Dawkins, who was bitten by a werewolf during a camping trip in the woods a week before his senior year of high school. After the bite transforms him into a werewolf, he fights against vampires, werecats, ghosts, zombies, and other supernatural entities to keep his hometown of Pleasantville safe - even though almost everyone in Pleasantville believes that their protector, dubbed the "Pleasantville Werewolf", is dangerous.

== Overview ==
Thomas "Tommy" P. Dawkins is a teenager who is bitten by a werewolf during a camping trip. After returning to his home town of Pleasantville, of which his father is the mayor, there are sightings of the "Pleasantville Werewolf". The first person to find out that Tommy is the Pleasantville Werewolf is Tommy's goth friend Merton J. Dingle, a keen expert of the supernatural. Together, they battle other paranormal creatures that come into their town. Despite Tommy's best efforts to protect Pleasantville, almost everybody sees him as a dangerous monster, including twin brothers Tim and Travis Eckert who are obsessed with hunting the werewolf down.

In the first season, Tommy's love interest is Stacy Hanson, and most of the other characters are completely unaware of Tommy's secret. They date at some points but due to Tommy's vigilante lifestyle as a lycanthrope, his transformations interfere with their relationship. At the end of the first season, Stacy leaves for college after graduation.

Some of the antagonists in the series take a toll on Tommy, such as the werewolf who bit him. Tommy also stands against a Werewolf Syndicate who intends on using Tommy to create other werewolves, as they are unable to since they are not Alphas like Tommy.

Taking Stacy's place as Tommy's love interest is Lori Baxter, a former Catholic school girl who was expelled for vandalism. Lori is an expert fighter who realizes Tommy's secret and later befriends Tommy and Merton and joins them in fighting evil.

Along with Tommy's relationships, some of the drama they struggle with is Merton being temporarily cursed by Medusa, as well as their frequent encounters with the Syndicate. At some point Merton and Lori, on two occasions, are turned into werewolves themselves. Merton is accidentally bitten while doing dental work on Tommy, and becomes excited at the notion of becoming a werewolf, and Lori is bitten by Tommy after he is brainwashed during an encounter with the Syndicate, which results in a takeover. Both are cured before becoming permanent werewolves, but Tommy, despite his own attempts at being cured, is unsuccessful in finding a cure as he is a full werewolf. Despite this, he accepts that being a werewolf is his fate; though an unwanted one.

== Episodes ==
Season	Episodes	Originally released	
Season	Episodes	First released	Last released
1	22	April 2, 1999	September 24, 1999
2	22	March 18, 2000	October 7, 2000
3	21	October 26, 2001	April 7, 2002

== Cast and characters ==
- Thomas "Tommy" P. Dawkins / "Pleasantville Werewolf" (portrayed by Brandon Quinn) - Tommy is a senior in high school and the main character of "Big Wolf on Campus". He was one of the most popular kids in the school and is the captain of the football team. His mother is the head reporter of Pleasantville news while his father is the Mayor of Pleasantville and he also has his couch potato brother named Dean. He has two love interests, Stacy Hanson in the first season and then Lori Baxter in the second. During a camping trip on the night before senior year, he is bitten by a werewolf known as Mr. Dunleavy, whom he meets in "Hair Today, Gone Tomorrow". He befriends social outcast Merton Dingle after Merton offers to help him with his lycanthropy. In the first season, his "wolfing out" made his relationship with Stacy Hanson difficult because he always had to leave to fight bad guys. In the second season, Stacy left for college early and his new love interest was Lori Baxter, who finds out about his secret after he has to save her from the Werewolf Syndicate. A recurring theme in the series is how he wants to get rid of his lycanthropy to no avail.
- Merton J. Dingle (portrayed by Danny Smith) - Merton is Tommy's best friend who helps him with his werewolf problem. He is a social outcast and a goth who is often the subject of bullying, especially by Tim and Travis. Tommy Dawkins and Lori Baxter are his only friends. He has converted his basement into what he calls his "lair", in which he, Tommy and later on, Lori use as their meeting place. He has a younger sister, Becky, with whom he has a rivalry and who often calls him "a freaker", and tries to act like he doesn't exist. He is very protective of her, however, but this often annoys his sister. At the same time, she showed appreciation of Merton when he cheered her up after a potential date stood her up without explanation. He is often the comic relief of the show with his quirky personality and his often cowardly behavior, but sometimes he has been shown to have courage by risking himself to save Tommy, such as when he leapt in front of Tommy and was turned to stone by Medusa instead of Tommy. He wishes that he were a werewolf too, often asking Tommy to pass on his lycanthropy to him, and even becoming a werewolf temporarily when he accidentally pricked his finger on one of Tommy's fangs during a dental exam. He has an encyclopedic knowledge of all things to do with mythology and movies, often giving movie references to everything. He is a budding screenwriter and often tries to write screenplays, and even got one sent to Corey Haim, who came to Pleasantville once himself. Merton has had many love interests throughout the series, with the main one being Lori Baxter in the second season, sometimes fighting with Tommy over her. He is very loyal to Tommy, but there was a recurring joke in the series in that he would attempt to make deals with enemies, though Tommy ends up defeating them afterward.
- Stacey Hanson (portrayed by Rachelle Lefevre) - Stacey Hanson is Tommy's love interest in Season one. She is the captain of the cheerleading squad and the most popular girl in school and is said to have dated seniors since the sixth grade. She has given Tommy several chances, but most of their dates are often ruined by Tommy "wolfing out", which she takes for him just ditching her. She left for college at the end of the first season, because Rachelle Lefèvre (who played Stacey) was doing the same thing.
- Lauren "Lori" Baxter (portrayed by Aimée Castle) - Lauren "Lori" Baxter is Tommy's friend and sometime sweetheart who debuts in season two. She transferred from Pleasantville Catholic for vandalizing a tribute to the school's football star which was wrecked during a one on one scrimmage between Tommy and the ghost of that star. She is a kickboxer and often uses her fighting skills to help Tommy beat the bad guys. Both Tommy and Merton like her, but she often picks Tommy over Merton. She is the only other person apart from Merton who knows that Tommy is a werewolf. She becomes a werewolf herself temporarily when she is bitten by Tommy, who was under the spell of the Syndicate, but was turned back into a human by Merton.

=== Other characters ===
- Tim and Travis Eckert / "T'N'T" (portrayed by Domenic Di Rosa and Rob deLeeuw) - Tim and Travis Eckert are two bullies at Tommy's school who are large and unintelligent, to the point where they have been juniors for six years. Although they admire Tommy, they are abusive toward Merton. They often try to capture "The Pleasantville Werewolf", not knowing that they're actually chasing Tommy.
- Dean Dawkins (portrayed by Jack Mosshammer) - Dean is Tommy's older brother. He is two years out of college, unemployed, and still lives with his parents. Dean is almost always found at home, sitting in a recliner and watching television.
- Sally Dawkins (portrayed by Jane Wheeler) - Sally is Tommy and Dean's mother. She's a local reporter in Pleasantville.
- Bob Dawkins (portrayed by Alan Fawcett) - Bob is Tommy and Dean's father and Sally's husband. He is the wealthy and influential mayor of Pleasantville.
- Becky Dingle (portrayed by Natalie Vansier) - Becky is Merton's younger sister. She often refers to him as "freaker". In one of her notable appearances, she is possessed by the serial killer "The Pleasantville Strangler".
- Hugo Bostwick (portrayed by Richard Jutras) - Hugo is the eccentric security guard at Pleasantville High School. The character was dropped after season one.
- Death (portrayed by Lawrence Bayne) - Death is an unstoppable force that mercilessly claims his victims' souls and takes them to the afterlife.
- Sandman (performed by Andy Jones) - The Sandman is a monster made of sandbags who enslaves anyone sleeping in an attempt to trap in nightmares.
- The Werewolf Syndicate Leader (portrayed by Marc Fiorini) - The unnamed leader of an organization of werewolves and primary antagonist of the series that attempts to use Tommy to create more. He attempts so by brainwashing Tommy but is nearly overthrown by a lycanthropic Lori. The Werewolf Syndicate Leader is killed along with the rest of the syndicate when they encounter a vampire that fed on werewolf blood.
- Gil (portrayed by Barry Julien) - Gil is the son of the Syndicate leader. He isn't evil and has a happy go lucky personality. He is shown to be afraid of his father, but regardless he attempts to take up his seat in the Syndicate after his father's death.
- "High Priestess" (portrayed by Sylvia Stewart) - An unnamed high priestess who convinces Merton to pay her to clear up his "skin condition" in the episode "Invisible Merton".

== Production ==
- Originally, Brandon Quinn had more extreme werewolf make-up. He had an allergic reaction to the glue and the look had to be altered.
- Danny Smith, who played Merton J. Dingle wrote, produced, and sang the show's theme song. During the show, Merton tries writing a song, and actually writes the show's theme (albeit with one or two words changed).

=== Recurring gags ===
- When he's left alone with a bad guy, Merton often asks the villain what it's like to be what they are, e.g. "So, you're a soul stealing agent of the dark dominion, what's that like?" or "So, you're a cybernetic creation who turned on his creator, what's that like?" To which they will often reply with an answer like "it puts food on the table."
- Merton making a movie reference, then instead of talking about the movie itself, he would talk about either how the film was received or what he felt when he watched it. Tommy usually hits him and says "In the movie!" e.g. "This is like The Purple Rose of Cairo, Woody Allen's Oscar-nominated tale of longing and betrayal." "Yeah? What happened?" "The Academy snubbed him, it's all so political." "What happened in the movie!?" This was the most recognizable gag in the show. Merton made a reference to The Terminator but Tommy and Lori had already seen it. Even when Tommy was under a trance, he still hit Merton, and when they're in a parallel dimension, it is Tommy who makes the movie reference.
- Tommy's hero worship of John Elway, having an annual speech on him and also having an autographed rookie card of him.
- Merton trying to make a deal with his enemies when it looks like Tommy has lost.
- Merton saying someone has a rash in order to humiliate them, usually Tommy or Becky.
- Sometimes the villains call Tommy a dog-man, then Tommy always says werewolf.
- The syndicate leader often explains how evil werewolves are when Gil will usually spoil the drama with a perky or innocent comment.

== See also ==
- I Was a Teenage Werewolf
- Teen Wolf
- Teen Wolf the cartoon television series
- Teen Wolf (2011 TV series)
