= George P. Cosmatos =

Greek-Italian film director and screenwriter (1941–2005)

- Cosmatos in 1997
- Born: George Pan Cosmatos; 4 January 1941; Florence, Italy
- Died: 19 April 2005 (aged 64); Victoria, British Columbia, Canada
- Education: London Film School
- Occupation: Film director
- Years active: 1960–1997
- Spouse: Birgitta Ljungberg Cosmatos (m. 1960; died 1997)
- Children: Panos Cosmatos

George Pan Cosmatos (4 January 1941 – 19 April 2005) was a Greek-Italian film director and screenwriter. Following early success in his home country with drama films such as Massacre in Rome with Richard Burton (based on the real-life Ardeatine massacre), Cosmatos retooled his career towards mainstream "blockbuster" action and adventure films, including The Cassandra Crossing and Escape to Athena, both of which were British-Italian co-productions. After relocating to North America, he directed the horror film Of Unknown Origin. This was followed by some of his best-known work, including the action films Rambo: First Blood Part II and Cobra (both of which star Sylvester Stallone), the science-fiction horror film Leviathan, and the critically acclaimed Western movie Tombstone.

== Early life ==
Cosmatos was born to a Greek family in Florence, Italy, and grew up in Egypt and Cyprus. He is said to have spoken six languages. After studying film at the London Film School, where he met his future wife, Swedish sculptor and artist Birgitta Ljungberg, when they both were 17, he became assistant director to Otto Preminger on Exodus (1960), based on Leon Uris's novel about the birth of Israel. In 1960, he married Birgitta, born in Haverö, Ånge municipality in Medelpad, 26 July 1941. Thereafter he worked on Zorba the Greek (1964), in which Cosmatos had a small part as Boy with Acne. On 1 Feb. 1974, the couple had their first and only child, Panos Cosmatos, born in Rome. In the early 1980s, the family moved to Victoria, British Columbia.

== Career ==
Cosmatos found success in Italy for directing the films Rappresaglia (1973) with Marcello Mastroianni and The Cassandra Crossing (1976) with Sophia Loren. In 1979, he made the British World War II adventure film Escape to Athena, starring an all-star ensemble cast including Roger Moore, David Niven, Telly Savalas, Elliott Gould and Claudia Cardinale. He made his North American directorial debut with the Canadian horror film Of Unknown Origin. He then directed the box-office hit Rambo: First Blood Part II starring Sylvester Stallone, and Cobra, another Stallone film, in 1986. On 8 August 1986, Cosmatos agreed with De Laurentiis Entertainment Group to direct four films, but none would be made. In 1989, he directed the science-fiction horror film Leviathan, starring Peter Weller, Richard Crenna, Ernie Hudson and Amanda Pays, with special effects designed by Stan Winston.

Late in his career, Cosmatos received more praise for Tombstone, a 1993 Western movie about Doc Holliday and Wyatt Earp. This film was particularly praised for the exceptional performance of Val Kilmer as Doc Holliday. Kurt Russell, who played Wyatt Earp, said Stallone recommended Cosmatos to him after the removal of the first director, writer Kevin Jarre, but Cosmatos had also worked with Tombstone executive producer Andrew G. Vajna before on Rambo: First Blood Part II.

On 6 July 1997, his wife Birgitta died (she is buried where she was born), and Cosmatos's career came to a halt. Outside of his film career, Cosmatos was a collector of rare books, focusing mainly on 19th–20th century English literature and signed & inscribed works. His library was sold through Sotheby's.

George Pan Cosmatos died of lung cancer on 19 April 2005, at his home in Victoria, British Columbia at the age of 64. He was survived by his son, Panos Cosmatos, who has said that his independently released surreal film Beyond the Black Rainbow was funded primarily by royalties from his father's film Tombstone.

== Filmography ==
- Sin (1971)
- Massacre in Rome (1973)
- The Cassandra Crossing (1976)
- Escape to Athena (1979)
- Of Unknown Origin (1983)
- Rambo: First Blood Part II (1985)
- Cobra (1986)
- Leviathan (1989)
- Tombstone (1993)
- Shadow Conspiracy (1997)
