= The Screaming Woman =

- Title card
- Genre: Horror; Thriller
- Based on: A short story by Ray Bradbury
- Written by: Merwin Gerard
- Directed by: Jack Smight
- Starring: Olivia de Havilland; Ed Nelson; Laraine Stephens; Joseph Cotten
- Music by: John Williams
- Country of origin: United States
- Original language: English

Production
- Producer: William Frye
- Cinematography: Sam Leavitt
- Editor: Robert F. Shugrue
- Running time: 74 minutes
- Production company: Universal Television

Original release
- Network: ABC
- Release: January 29, 1972

The Screaming Woman is a 1972 American made-for-television horror-thriller film starring Olivia de Havilland and directed by Jack Smight. It is loosely based on a short story by Ray Bradbury (which in turn was based on his 1948 radio play for the CBS show Suspense) with a script written by Merwin Gerard. The film was produced by Universal Television and originally aired as an ABC Movie of the Week on 29 January 1972. It features John Williams's final score for a TV movie.

== Plot ==
De Havilland plays Laura Wynant, a wealthy former mental patient who has travelled to her country estate to recuperate. While there, she discovers, when hearing faint calls for help, that a woman has been buried alive on her property. Laura tries to inform others of what she has found but nobody believes her, and her family begins to suspect a relapse in her mental condition. Because her hands are nearly crippled by arthritis, she is not able to dig the woman up herself. She tricks a local boy into assisting her by telling him she is digging for a lost earring, but when he is scared by the cries of the buried woman she is forced to tell him the truth, which results in a confrontation with the lad's angry father. While going door-to-door to seek help she encounters the buried woman's husband, who had buried her after striking her on the head with a shovel and thought her dead. Laura is confined to her home under doctor's orders but, in a fit of desperation, experiences enough recovery from the arthritis to provide strength in her hands. She begins to dig up the buried woman, who is still alive. Just then the murderous husband arrives on the scene, intending to bury his wife's body thoroughly. He comes up behind Laura and is about to strike her with the shovel when the buried woman grabs Laura's hand and pulls herself up out of the ground. The husband is petrified, giving the authorities just enough time to arrive on the scene and save Laura and the buried woman.

== Cast ==
- Olivia de Havilland as Laura Wynant
- Ed Nelson as Carl Nesbitt
- Laraine Stephens as Caroline Wynant
- Joseph Cotten as George Tresvant
- Walter Pidgeon as Dr. Amos Larkin
- Charles Knox Robinson as Howard Wynant
- Alexandra Hay as Evie Carson
- Lonny Chapman as Police Sergeant
- Charles Drake as Ken Bronson
- Russell Wiggins as Harry Sands
- Gene Andrusco as David
- Joyce Cunningham as Bernice Wilson
- Jan Arvan as Martin, the Servant
- Ray Montgomery as Ted Wilson
- John Alderman as Slater

== Television debuts ==
The film was first shown in the United States on 29 January 1972, in Great Britain on 2 January 1973 (Granada region), and in Sweden on 23 June 1973.

== Other adaptations ==
A television adaptation more faithful to the source material was broadcast as "The Screaming Woman", episode 5 of season 1 of The Ray Bradbury Theater, on 22 February 1986.

A parody of the story appears in the Simpsons in the episode "Simpsons Wicked This Way Comes" with Bart discovering the screaming but no one believing him.
