= Bumpety Boo =

1985 television anime

- Promotional image featuring the main characters

へーい!ブンブー (Hey! Bumboo)
- Genre: Adventure
- Anime television series
- Directed by: Eiji Okabe; Kenjiro Yoshida
- Produced by: Shoji Sato
- Written by: Asami Watanane; Keiko Mukuroji; Hiroshi Ohnogi; Kenjirō Yoshida; Mami Watanabe; Naoko Miyake; Niisan Takahashi; Nobuyuki Isshiki
- Music by: Nobuyoshi Koshibe
- Studio: Nippon Animation
- Original network: NHK General TV
- Original run: April 8, 1985 – April 3, 1986
- Episodes: 130

Bumpety Boo (へーい!ブンブー, Hēi! Bumbū; Hey! Bumboo) is an anime children's television series produced by the Nippon Animation company from 1985 to 1986. The series consists of 130 7-minute segments, distributed as 43 half-hour episodes.

== Synopsis ==
The show follows the adventures of a young boy named Ken, who has always dreamed of owning a car, and Bumpety Boo, a talking yellow car who hatched from an egg in the first episode, as they travel the world in search for Bumpety Boo's mother. Bumpety Boo, the fun-loving car, makes friends with Ken. Teaming up seems like a natural thing, but Bumpety Boo does not count on Ken's adventurous eight-year-old spirit. Throughout the series, Professor Honky-Tonk tries to steal Bumpety Boo from Ken.

During their expedition, they have great adventures and help a lot of people they encounter on their way. They also encounter other talking cars. Bumpety Boo usually races them and always wins because of his strength and speed, which he receives after he smells flowers. At the end of the series, the group finds his mother.

== Regional releases ==
In 1989, Saban Entertainment had episodes of the show dubbed in English for North American audiences. In the early 1990s, Celebrity Home Entertainment's Just For Kids Division had these English dubbed episodes released on several VHS tapes. The show was aired for free on television in Australia in the mid 90s. The anime was dubbed to Arabic in Kuwait by end of the 1980s and was called Bombo (بومبو).

== Cast ==
=== Japanese cast ===
- Masako Nozawa - Bumboo
- Chika Sakamoto - Ken
- Kenichi Ogata - Dr. Monkey
- Yōko Asagami - Helena

=== English cast ===
- Julian Bailey - Ken
- Aimée Castle - Helena
- Brendan Stitchman
- Vlasta Vrána
- Dean Hagopian
- Rick Jones
- Pauline Little
- Matthew Mackay
- Ethan Tobman
- Jeremy Steinberg
- Elliott Mitmaker
- Walter Massey
- Bronwen Mantel
- A.J. Henderson
