= Scarecrow and Mrs. King =

American television series (1983–1987)

- Created by: Brad Buckner; Eugenie Ross-Leming
- Starring: Kate Jackson; Bruce Boxleitner; Beverly Garland; Mel Stewart; Martha Smith; Greg Morton; Paul Stout; Sam Melville
- Composer: Arthur B. Rubinstein
- Country of origin: United States
- No. of seasons: 4
- No. of episodes: 88 (list of episodes)

Production
- Running time: 47-48 min.
- Production companies: Shoot the Moon Enterprises; B&E Enterprises (episodes 1–11); Warner Bros. Television

Original release
- Network: CBS
- Release: October 3, 1983 – May 28, 1987

Scarecrow and Mrs. King is an American television series that aired from October 3, 1983, to May 28, 1987, on CBS. The music underscore was composed by Arthur B. Rubinstein.

The show starred Kate Jackson and Bruce Boxleitner, as divorced housewife Amanda King and top-level "Agency" operative Lee Stetson, respectively, who begin an unusual partnership and eventual romance after encountering one another in a train station.

== Plot ==
Amanda King is a divorced housewife who lives with her mother, Dotty, and her young sons, Philip and Jamie.

One morning, Agency operative Lee Stetson, code-named "Scarecrow", hands her a package while he is being pursued. He instructs her to "give it to the man in the red hat", but she is unable to complete the assignment, as there are many men in red fezzes in the train car at the time. Scarecrow later has to track her down to recover the package, inadvertently getting her involved with his case. When Stetson is captured by his pursuers and marked for elimination, King ends up solving the secret behind the package, finding and rescuing Stetson, and even taking down their opponents, thereby getting introduced to the Agency.

Inquisitive, King seeks to learn more about the organization and ends up working for them, first in an office role and later receiving training to become a full agent, while keeping her new job a secret from her family. She works under Stetson's boss, Billy Melrose, and with dismissive fellow agent Francine Desmond. Stetson and King work together even though he is initially reluctant to work with the "rookie" but eventually they become a good team.

The pair travel to places like Germany and England and help each other as they pose as other people, sometimes posing as husband and wife. Escapades involving cruise ships and getting "married" are some of their assignments, and the KGB or other enemies of the United States are always involved. Amanda's ex-husband, Joe King, is still friendly with Amanda and is later suspected of murder.

Stetson and King develop a friendship that turns into a romantic relationship. While many suitors for King and Stetson appear, in the end they stay with each other. Stetson professes his love for King before going into hiding from the Agency, and he then proposes after her kidnapping. However, because of concerns for the safety of King's family, they must keep the marriage secret from their employer, friends, and families.

== Cast ==
=== Main cast ===
- Kate Jackson as Amanda King
- Bruce Boxleitner as Lee Stetson ("Scarecrow")
- Beverly Garland as Dotty West (Amanda's mother)
- Paul Stout as Philip King (Amanda's son)
- Greg Morton as Jamie King (Amanda's son)
- Mel Stewart as Billy Melrose
- Martha Smith as Francine Desmond

=== Guest cast ===
- Hildegard Knef, Russian princess targeted by assassins, 1.21, "Waiting for Godorsky" (credited as Hildegard Neff)
- Jean Stapleton, British spy Lady Emily Farnsworth, two episodes, 2.4, "The Legend of Das Geisterschloss", and 2.11, "The Three Faces of Emily"
- Raleigh Bond, T.P. Aquinas, eleven episodes
- Howard Duff, Captain Harry Thornton, two episodes, 3.4, "Tail of the Dancing Weasel", and 4.22, "The Khrushchev List"
- James Cromwell, Gregory, two episodes, 3.4, "Tail of the Dancing Weasel", and 3.18, "Wrong Number"
- Thomas Babson, King's boyfriend, three episodes, 1.1, "The First Time", 1.5, "The ACM Kid", and 2.16, "Life of the Party"
- John Saxon, Dirk Fredericks, two episodes, 1.1, "The First Time", and 1.8, "Saved by the Bells"
- John Rhys-Davies, Lord Bromfield, episode 2.8, "Affair at Bromfield Hall"
- Ian Wolfe, Rupert Simpson, episode 3.15, "The Pharaoh's Engineer"
- Yakov Smirnoff, Bela Pravik, episode 1.9, "Sudden Death"
- Jerry Hardin, John C. Crandall, episode 1.9, "Sudden Death"
- Michael Alldredge, Coach Leopold, episode 1.9, "Sudden Death"

== Episodes ==
Season	Episodes	Originally released	
Season	Episodes	First released	Last released
1	21	October 3, 1983	May 7, 1984
2	23	October 1, 1984	May 13, 1985
3	22	September 23, 1985	May 12, 1986
4	22	September 19, 1986	May 28, 1987

== Release ==
The TV series aired weekly on CBS from October 3, 1983 until May 28, 1987, airing reruns until September 10, 1987.

== Home media ==
Warner Home Video has released all four seasons on DVD in Region 1.

From 2023 to 2026, the entire series was available for online viewing through Amazon Prime Video, The Roku Channel and Tubi.

DVD name	Ep No.	Release date
The Complete First Season	21	March 9, 2010
The Complete Second Season	23	March 22, 2011
The Complete Third Season	22	March 20, 2012
The Complete Fourth and Final Season	22	January 22, 2013

== Reception ==
Scarecrow and Mrs. King won a 1986 Emmy Award for Outstanding Music Composition for a Series (Dramatic Underscore). In 1985, Kate Jackson was nominated for Best Performance by an Actress in a TV Series, in addition to two nominations for Costuming. It was also nominated for a Golden Globe Award in 1985 for Outstanding Cinematography for a Series.

Scarecrow and Mrs. King was the 20th-most-watched program (18.3) and (17.1) in both the 1983–84 and 1984-85 television seasons. After coming in 28th in 1985-86 (17.4), CBS moved the show to Friday nights, where it finished 41st (14.6) in its final season.
