= Aimée Castle =

Canadian actress

- Born: Montreal, Quebec, Canada
- Other name: Aimee Castle
- Occupation: Actress
- Years active: 1983–2002; 2012–present
- Children: 1
- Relatives: Maggie Castle (sister)

Aimée Castle is a Canadian actress known for her role as Lori Baxter on the TV series Big Wolf on Campus, Robyn Hood on Back to Sherwood, Satan's School for Girls, as well as numerous voice acting work such as in Hitman: Absolution, Grand Theft Auto V, Final Fantasy Type-0 HD and Lego Star Wars: The Force Awakens.

== Early life ==
Castle is from Montreal, Quebec, Canada. She is a Dawson College graduate and studied journalism at Ryerson University.

== Career ==
Castle began acting at the age of five as a birthday party child in the Warner Bros. Pictures film Of Unknown Origin starring Peter Weller.

She made appearances in television and movies such as Are You Afraid of the Dark?, the lead role of Robyn Hood in Back to Sherwood, Teen Sorcery, Laserhawk, Satan's School for Girls, Student Bodies, Mr. Headmistress and An American Affair as well as the voice of Helena in the English version of the children's anime television series Bumpety Boo.

She played Lori Baxter in Big Wolf on Campus.

== Personal life ==
Aimée is the older sister of actress Maggie Castle, and has a daughter named Emma. She is an avid fan of the Montreal Canadiens.

== Filmography ==
- Of Unknown Origin (1983) – Birthday Party Child
- Bumpety Boo (1985) – Helena (voice)
- Bouli (1989) – Additional Voices
- Mindfield (1989) – Little Girl
- Gold and Paper (1990) – Maureen Thompson
- Scanners III: The Takeover (1992) – Young Helena
- Love and Human Remains (1993) – Bernie's Drug Dealer
- Papa Beaver's Storytime (1993) – Additional Voices
- Are You Afraid of the Dark? (1995) – Greta
- An American Affair (1997) – Prostitute
- Laserhawk (1997) – Tracy Altergot
- Mr. Headmistress (1998) – Wendy
- When He Didn't Come Home (1998) – Becky
- Back to Sherwood (1998) – Robyn Hood
- Student Bodies (1999) – Girl
- The Secret Path (1999) – Lydia
- Teen Sorcery (1999) – Franny
- Satan's School for Girls (2000) – Courtney
- Big Wolf on Campus (2000–2002) – Lori Baxter
- Dice (2001) – Shelby Scott
- Mona the Vampire (2001) – Additional Voices
- Ice Age: Continental Drift (2012) – Additional Voices
- Hitman: Absolution (2012) – Additional Voices
- Grand Theft Auto V (2013) – Local Population
- Final Fantasy Type-0 HD (2015) – Qun'mi Tru'e
- Lego Jurassic World (2015)
- Star Ocean: Integrity and Faithlessness (2016) – Fiore Brunelli
- Lego Star Wars: The Force Awakens (2016) – Stormtrooper
- Judgment (2019) – Saori Shirosaki
- The Loud House (2020) – Ms. Borutski (voice)
- American Dad (20??)
