= Armed and Innocent =

- Genre: Drama; Thriller
- Written by: Danielle Hill
- Directed by: Jack Bender
- Starring: Andrew Starnes; Kate Jackson; Gerald McRaney
- Music by: Dennis McCarthy
- Country of origin: United States
- Original language: English

Production
- Executive producer: Barney Cohen
- Producer: Jack Bender
- Editor: Jack Bender
- Running time: 120 minutes
- Production companies: Gillian Productions; Republic Pictures
- Budget: Approximately $700,000

Original release
- Network: CBS
- Release: January 4, 1994

Armed and Innocent is an American crime/thriller made-for-TV film, directed by Jack Bender and starring Andrew Starnes, Gerald McRaney and Kate Jackson. Released in 1994, it was loosely based on actual events.

== Plot ==
An 11-year-old boy, Chris Holland, is left at home alone after school. When three intruders invade their home, Chris uses a .22 rifle to shoot and kill two of them. The third intruder Ricky, who escaped, plots with their now imprisoned former leader Earl, to get revenge.

Chris is traumatized by the realization that he killed two people and has difficulty coping with his home and school life. His father, Bobby Lee, worsens Chris's situation by his distant and macho behavior, assuming that his son should feel like a hero and not suffer from the incident. Chris's mother Patsy, after being told by the police that they cannot find Ricky, moves the family to a new house.

When Earl gets out of jail near the end of the film, he picks up Ricky, and they seek revenge by confronting Chris and his family in the front yard of their new house.

== Background ==
The film is based on the true story of William Todd Knight, an eleven year old boy who shot and killed intruders Danny Ray Abernathy and Broadus Petty at his house in Spartanburg County in March 1988.

== Home media ==
The film was released on VHS in Region 2 in the PAL format. It also had a Region 0, NTSC formatted DVD which was released in Japan. This does contain the English version of the film, with optional Japanese subtitles.
