= Back to Sherwood =

British-Canadian television series

- Countries of origin: United Kingdom; Canada
- No. of episodes: 13

Production
- Running time: 30 minutes

Original release
- Release: 2 September – 25 November 1998

Back to Sherwood is a television series that originally aired on CBC Television in 1998. Created by Ellis Iddon and Phil Meagher of Winklemania Productions (UK). The theme music was also written and performed by Ellis Iddon and Phil Meagher.

== Plot overview ==
When Robyn Hood finds a magical amulet, she finds that she can go back in time to the medieval ages in England when she puts it on. In the past, she learns that Robin Hood and Maid Marian have been captured and trapped by magical means by a sorceress in league with the Sheriff of Nottingham. As their descendant, Robyn and her own group of merry teens must save her ancestors and protect Sherwood.

== Cast ==
- Alexa Dubreuil as Joan Little
- Alexa Devine as Joan Little
- Aimée Castle as Robyn Hood
- Larry Day as Guy of Gisbourne
- Angela Galuppo as Tanya
- Anik Matern as Brenan the witch

== Episodes ==
- S1.E1 ∙ Into the Woods ∙ September 2, 1998
- S1.E2 ∙ The Sherwood All-Stars ∙ September 9, 1998
- S1.E3 ∙ The King's Gift ∙ September 16, 1998
- S1.E4 ∙ A Bagful of Goodies ∙ September 23, 1998
- S1.E5 ∙ Brenan's Assassin ∙ September 30, 1998
- S1.E6 ∙ Ancestors ∙ October 7, 1998
- S1.E7 ∙ The Holy Relic ∙ October 14, 1998
- S1.E8 ∙ Scribblers ∙ October 21, 1998
- S1.E9 ∙ Rebellion ∙ October 28, 1998
- S1.E10 ∙ Smoke and Mirrors ∙ November 4, 1998
- S1.E11 ∙ Joust in Time ∙ November 11, 1998
- S1.E12 ∙ All That Glitters ∙ November 18, 1998
- S1.E13 ∙ Bird in Hand ∙ November 25, 1998

== Reception ==
Back to Sherwood currently stands at a 7.6 based on 33 reviews on IMDb.
