= Of Unknown Origin =

1983 film by George P. Cosmatos

- Theatrical release poster
- Directed by: George P. Cosmatos
- Screenplay by: Brian Taggert
- Based on: The Visitor by Chauncey G. Parker III
- Produced by: Claude Héroux
- Starring: Peter Weller; Jennifer Dale; Lawrence Dane; Kenneth Welsh; Louis Del Grande; Shannon Tweed
- Cinematography: René Verzier
- Edited by: Roberto Silvi; Hubert de La Bouillerie
- Music by: Kenneth Wannberg
- Production companies: Les Productions Mutuelles; Famous Players; Canadian Film Development Corporation
- Distributed by: Mutual Productions (Canada); Warner Bros. Pictures (United States)
- Release dates: September 30, 1983 (Fresno, California); November 23, 1983 (United States); November 25, 1983 (Canada)
- Running time: 89 minutes
- Countries: Canada (Note: Sources vary about the film's country of origin. The British Film Institute lists the film as a Canadian production, while the American Film Institute lists the film as a Canadian-United States co-production.); United States
- Language: English
- Box office: $1.1 million (United States)

Of Unknown Origin is a 1983 psychological horror film directed by George P. Cosmatos in his North American film debut, and starring Peter Weller, Jennifer Dale, Lawrence Dane, Kenneth Welsh, Louis Del Grande, and Shannon Tweed in her film debut. Based on the novel The Visitor by Chauncey G. Parker III, it focuses on a mild-mannered Manhattan banker who becomes increasingly obsessive and destructive in his attempts to kill a rat loose in his renovated brownstone. The film's title refers to the misconception (repeated in the film) that rats have no known origin.

A co-production between Canada and the United States, the film was primarily shot in Montreal, with some additional shooting taking place in New York City. The film was released theatrically on November 23, 1983, by Warner Bros. Pictures. It received generally positive reviews from critics, with much praise for Weller's leading performance.

== Plot ==
Bart Hughes, a mild-mannered investment banker in New York City, moves with his wife Meg and their son Peter into a brownstone he helped to renovate. Meg's wealthy father Milton invites the family to a vacation in Vermont, but Bart declines, preferring to work on a project that should get him a promotion. Shortly after Meg and Peter leave, Bart learns that the project has been assigned to another employee, James Hall. Bart is outraged, until his boss, Eliot Riverton, assigns him the important task of writing a reorganization plan for the company's branch offices, due in two weeks. Eliot also invites Bart to join him at a dinner party for the bank's Los Angeles branch manager the following Thursday.

That evening, Bart discovers a leak from the dishwasher that floods his kitchen floor. Clete, the superintendent of a neighboring apartment building, determines that the hole in the drainage hose was caused by a rat. He also informs Bart that rats can survive almost anything, including an atomic explosion, and warns that the females are twice as vicious as their male counterparts. Bart sets traps for the critter that evening, but when he examines them the next day, the bait has been removed and the traps are badly damaged. He spends his lunch break at the library researching rat behavior, and although he is horrified by the revelations, he shares them at the dinner party that evening, ruining the appetites of the other guests.

Unable to find an exterminator on short notice, Bart seeks help from a hardware salesman, who recommends the use of poison. Meanwhile, the rat creeps through the house, leaving behind a path of destruction. Bart wakes in the middle of the night and is terrified by the sight of the rat inside the toilet bowl. He flushes the toilet, but the animal survives and makes its way back into the house. The next evening, Bart searches for his nemesis in the basement, and finds a litter of newborn rat pups; confirming the rat is indeed female. When Bart kills the pups, he narrowly escapes the mother rat's retaliation.

At the office, Eliot compliments Bart on the quality of his work, but asks if the tight deadline is causing him stress. Bart assures Eliot that his troubles are not work-related, and they will soon be under control. After work, Bart shares a taxicab with his secretary, Lorrie Wells, and invites her into his home. Lorrie expresses admiration for Bart's handiwork, then asks if his recent troubles are related to his marriage. Bart responds by kissing Lorrie, but she is distracted by the sound of the scurrying rat and is anxious to leave. Afterward, Bart notices a stray cat outside the front door and takes it in; hoping it will eliminate the invader. Days later, when he discovers the cat brutally slaughtered, Bart makes another unsuccessful attempt to hire an exterminator. He telephones Meg, begging for her return, but she has no desire to shorten her vacation.

The next morning, Bart enters the basement, armed with a baseball bat; but quickly retreats, realizing he is no match for the creature. Bart is further daunted upon finding the report he has been preparing for the last week, chewed to pieces. Unshaven and disheveled, Bart approaches Eliot in the lobby of the office building, and declares that his first priority is to address his troubles at home. Eliot asks only that Bart not allow the other employees to see him in his current condition.

Bart injures his hand while retrieving a rattrap, and drinks whiskey in the bathtub until he falls asleep. He dreams of a happy reunion with his family, interrupted by the rat attacking Meg, and Peter accidentally ingesting poison. As Bart regains consciousness, the creature descends from the ceiling, forcing him to take refuge on a hammock suspended above the bedroom floor. Meg attempts to reach him by telephone, as does Eliot, but neither is successful; as the rat has severed the line. Donning leg and arm pads, and reinforcing his baseball bat with nails and the jaws of broken rattraps, Bart enters the basement to face his nemesis. He swings wildly at the rat, rupturing pipes and flooding the basement. Bart continues his pursuit as the rat enters a scale model of the house, which he pummels with the bat until the creature is dead. He walks through his vandalized living room to the front door, as Meg and Peter return home. When Meg inquires about the damage to their home, Bart replies, "I had a party."

== Cast ==
- Peter Weller as Bart Hughes
- Jennifer Dale as Lorrie Wells
- Lawrence Dane as Eliot Riverton
- Kenneth Welsh as James Hall
- Maury Chaykin as Dan Errol
- Louis Del Grande as Clete
- Shannon Tweed as Meg Hughes
- Keith Knight as Hardware Salesman
- Jimmy Tapp as Milton
- Leif Anderson as Peter Hughes
- Gayle Garfinkle as Janis Wyckoff
- Bronwen Mantel as Florence Riverton
- Earl Pennington as Thompson
- Amber T. Chase as Audra
- Aimée Castle as Girl At Birthday Party

== Production ==
=== Development ===
The screenplay is based on the novel The Visitor by Chauncey G. Parker III, which focuses on a rat that takes control of banker Bart Hughes' home. Screenwriter Brian Taggert was hired by executive producer Pierre David to adapt the novel for the screen. Taggert had previously written the slasher film Visiting Hours (1982) for David, and had been hired for that project after producer and assistant Denise Di Novi saw one of Taggert's plays being performed in Los Angeles.

Taggert based the character of Bart Hughes on his own stepfather, whom he described as being obsessed with cleanliness and order. He devised the title based on a Webster's Dictionary definition of "rat", which denoted the species as being of "unknown origin."

Director George P. Cosmatos was impressed by the novel's cinematic potential, and traced the motion picture rights to David. Of Unknown Origin would be Cosmatos' North American film debut, after a decade of working in Europe.

=== Casting ===
Cosmatos convinced Peter Weller to star in the film, which he pitched as a survival story. "Both stories parallel each other," Weller said. "The ambition of the guy with his job draws comparisons to the guy who is trying to kill this rat at the expense of his house. The theme of it all is to survive at all costs." For tax purposes, most of the other cast members were Canadian. The film marked the acting debuts of both Shannon Tweed and Aimée Castle.

=== Filming ===
Principal photography began in Montreal on November 10, 1982, with a few days of location shooting in New York City. The interior scenes were shot on a soundstage set recreating a Manhattan brownstone, designed by Anne Pritchard. The film was shot largely in sequence, so that the set could be systematically "maimed" as the story progressed. Filming was completed on December 23, 1982.

== Release ==
Of Unknown Origin was given a limited regional release by Warner Bros. Pictures in Fresno, California, beginning September 30, 1983. Its release expanded to New York City, Los Angeles, and other metropolitan areas on November 23, 1983, the week of Thanksgiving in the United States. The film premiered in Canada the same week, opening on November 25, 1983.

=== Home media ===
Warner Home Video released Of Unknown Origin on VHS in 1984, and issued a DVD in 2003. Scream Factory released the film on Blu-ray for the first time on May 22, 2018, featuring a new 2K scan from an interpositive element.

Vinegar Syndrome released a 4K UHD Blu-ray edition on August 25, 2026.

== Reception ==
=== Box office ===
During its opening November 23, 1983 weekend in the United States, the film earned $540,446. It ultimately grossed $1,080,470 in the United States.

=== Critical response ===
Vincent Canby of The New York Times had nothing but disdain for the movie, but lightly praised Weller's performance and opens his review: "Peter Weller, one of our best young stage and screen actors, is not at all bad in a rather terrible, Canadian suspense-horror film mysteriously titled Of Unknown Origin." Kevin Thomas of the Los Angeles Times praised the film, describing it as "a visual tour de force... Of Unknown Origin is just fast, taut and darkly comic enough not to seem preposterous. Instead, it takes on the credibility of a nightmare. As a result, it is amazingly well sustained." Michael D. Reid of the Times Colonist praised the film as a "provocative thriller" that will "appeal to movie-goers who like a good scare and a mental challenge. It gleams with considerable class and polish." LA Weekly critic F. X. Feeney lauded the film's dark sense of humor and observed a "sly intelligence at work" in the screenplay.

The Globe and Mail's Stephen Godfrey drew comparisons to Straw Dogs (1971) but was ultimately unimpressed by the film, finding it ineffective as a horror movie.

According to the film website JoBlo, writer Stephen King has named Of Unknown Origin one of his favorite horror films.

As of July 2026, the film holds a 63% approval rating on the review aggregator website Rotten Tomatoes, based on eight critical reviews. On Metacritic, it has a weighted average score of 51 out of 100 based on four critics, indicating "mixed or average" reviews.

=== Accolades ===
Award/association	Year	Category	Recipient(s) and nominee(s)	Result	Ref.
Paris International Festival of Fantastic and Science-Fiction Film	1983	Grand Prix	George P. Cosmatos	Won	
Paris International Festival of Fantastic and Science-Fiction Film	1983	Best Actor	Peter Weller	Won	

== See also ==
- List of films featuring home invasions

== Sources ==
- Muir, John Kenneth (2010). Horror Films of the 1980s. Jefferson, North Carolina: McFarland & Company. ISBN 978-0-786-45501-0.
