= Satan's School for Girls (1973 film) =

- DVD cover
- Genre: Crime; Horror; Mystery; Drama
- Written by: Arthur A. Ross
- Directed by: David Lowell Rich
- Starring: Pamela Franklin; Kate Jackson; Lloyd Bochner; Jamie Smith Jackson; Roy Thinnes; Jo Van Fleet; Cheryl Ladd
- Music by: Laurence Rosenthal
- Country of origin: United States
- Original language: English

Production
- Executive producer: Peter Dunne
- Producers: Aaron Spelling; Leonard Goldberg
- Production locations: The Rock Store - 30354 Mulholland Highway, Cornell, California; King Gillette Ranch, Malibu Creek State Park - Mulholland Highway, Calabasas, California; 20th Century Fox Studios
- Cinematography: Tim Southcott
- Editors: Brian Brunette; Allan Jacobs
- Running time: 74 minutes
- Production companies: Spelling-Goldberg Productions; Renaissance Content Group (Current distribution only)

Original release
- Network: ABC
- Release: September 19, 1973

Satan's School for Girls is a 1973 American made-for-television horror film directed by David Lowell Rich, and produced by Aaron Spelling under its production company Spelling-Goldberg Productions. The film premiered on ABC on September 19, 1973. The film has been named as one of the most memorable television movies of the 1970s.

== Plot ==
A mysterious person seems to be chasing student Martha Sayers (Terry Lumley), who drives to her sister's lakeside house in Los Angeles. The same day, the police and Martha's sister Elizabeth (Pamela Franklin) find her hanged in the living room. The police rule her death as an unmotivated suicide, but Elizabeth refuses to believe this and investigates further. She decides to visit the exclusive academy that Martha attended, The Salem Academy for Women, despite warnings from Martha's roommate, Lucy Dembrow (Gwynne Gilford). Under the assumed name of Elizabeth Morgan, she enrolls at the college, where she is welcomed by her classmates Roberta Lockhart (Kate Jackson), Debbie Jones (Jamie Smith Jackson) and Jody Keller (Cheryl Ladd).

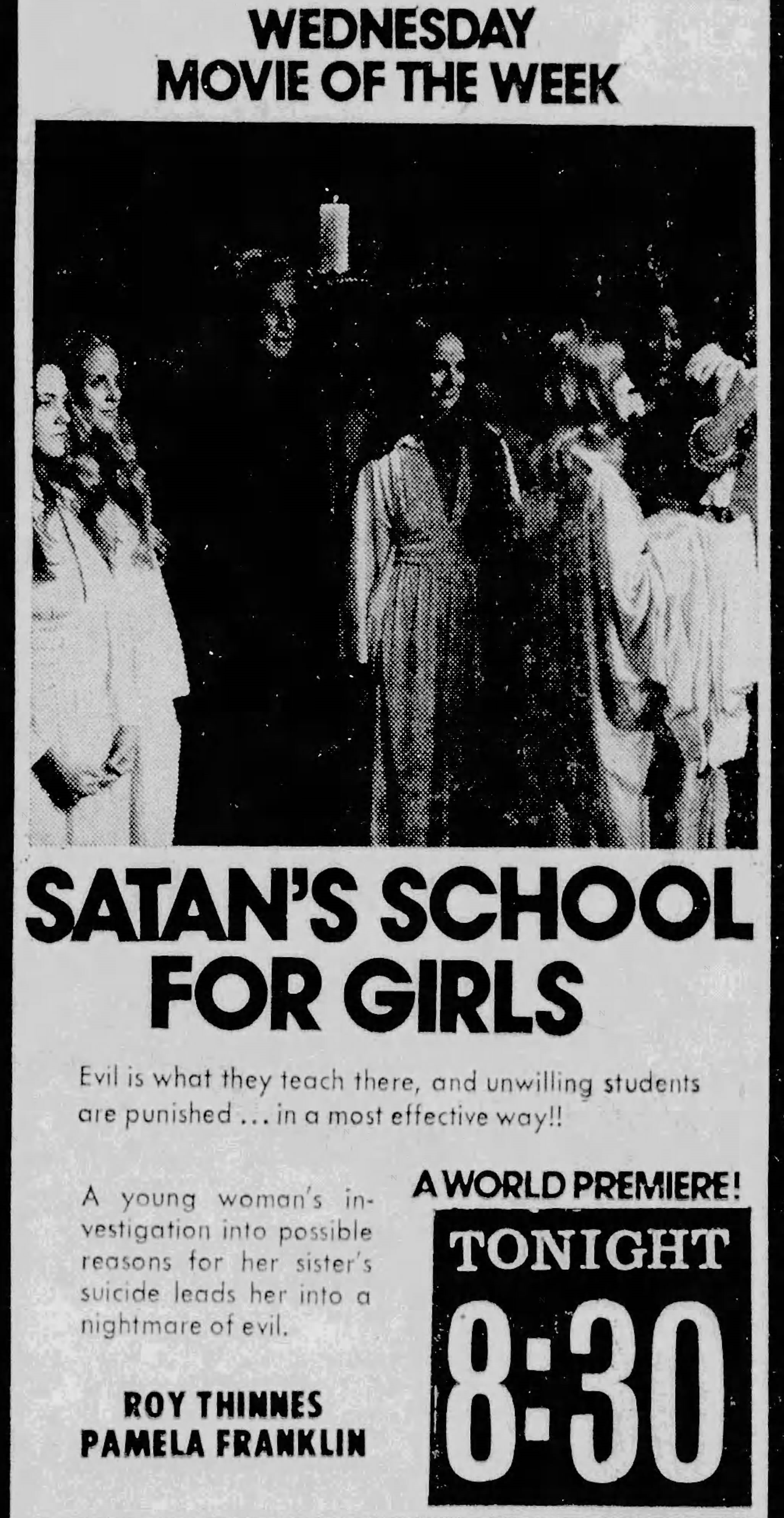
Newspaper advertisement, September 19, 1973

Elizabeth notes several strange occurrences, but postpones further investigation. Debbie has an outburst in class. The feared headmistress, Mrs. Jessica Williams (Jo Van Fleet), is worried about the influence of "the new girl". When Lucy commits suicide, Elizabeth resumes her investigation. She becomes intrigued with a painting of Martha in a dungeon-like room. Debbie, who painted it, is terrified of the painting and claims she invented the background, but Elizabeth finds an identical setting in a cellar on campus. When she is startled by a man with a straight razor, Elizabeth flees.

The next night, Elizabeth returns to the cellar with Roberta, who is now suspicious as well. They locate a hidden room in which they find the dead body of Debbie, who earlier that evening had tried to leave the campus. Elizabeth suspects that Professor Delacroix (Lloyd Bochner) is responsible, considering his eccentric and mildly sadistic behavior. Elizabeth bursts into his office, finding him in a deranged state with a gun in his hand. He fears something supernatural is stalking him, and he jumps through the window. After running for some time, he ends up mired in a swamp, where he is beaten with sticks by several students including Jody.

Meanwhile, the otherwise popular Dr. Joseph Clampett (Roy Thinnes) reveals to Williams that he is responsible for all the murders. He orders the headmistress to evacuate the school. Elizabeth and Roberta are unaware of the evacuation. They discover the body of Delacroix, who has been brutally murdered. Elizabeth and Roberta turn to Williams for help, but she has gone insane.

When they are unsuccessful in calling the police, Elizabeth and Roberta go to the cellar to find a gun. Instead, they find Clampett leading a Satanic cult. His followers (including Jody) believe that he is Satan incarnate, and Roberta reveals herself as his loyal servant. Elizabeth is able to escape when she sets the school on fire, and she takes Williams with her. However, the other girls stay behind. The entire building is engulfed in flames. Clampett supernaturally survives the fire and is shown outdoors, then mysteriously disappears, leaving only a patch of charred grass where he stood.

== Cast ==
- Pamela Franklin as Elizabeth Sayers/Elizabeth Morgan
- Kate Jackson as Roberta Lockhart
- Lloyd Bochner as Professor Delacroix
- Jamie Smith Jackson as Debbie Jones
- Roy Thinnes as Dr. Joseph Clampett
- Jo Van Fleet as Mrs. Jessica Williams
- Cheryl Ladd as Jody Keller
- Terry Lumley as Martha Sayers
- Gwynne Gilford as Lucy Dembrow

== Reception ==
In Black Gate, Thomas Parker wrote:

God help me, I love this wretched movie, which is inept in every possible way and only occasionally reaches the level of laughably bad. You can watch it on YouTube if you dare; I paid good money for a DVD of it, which sits on a sulphur-smelling shelf right next to my copies of Trilogy of Terror, The Night Stalker, Killdozer, The Stranger Within, Haunts of the Very Rich...

== Remake ==
A remake with the same title was released in 2000 with Kate Jackson appearing again, this time as the headmistress.

== See also ==
- List of American films of 1973
