= Limbo (1972 film) =

1972 film by Mark Robson

- Directed by: Mark Robson
- Written by: Joan Micklin Silver(original story, initial screenplay); James Bridges
- Starring: Kate Jackson
- Cinematography: Charles F. Wheeler
- Edited by: Dorothy Spencer
- Music by: Anita Kerr
- Production companies: Omaha; Orange; The Filmkers Group
- Distributed by: Universal Pictures
- Release date: November 1972
- Running time: 112 minutes
- Country: United States
- Language: English

Limbo is a 1972 American drama film directed by Mark Robson, about three wives whose husbands are missing in action in Vietnam. It stars Kate Jackson, Kathleen Nolan and Katherine Justice. It is based on a story by Joan Micklin Silver inspired by interviews Silver conducted with actual POW and MIA wives, which was serialized in McCall's magazine. Silver shares screenplay credit with James Bridges.

== Plot ==
Three women in Florida have husbands serving in Vietnam who are reported missing in action.

Mary Kay Beull has four children, the eldest of whom treats her with increasing hostility as she develops a friendship with Phil Garrett, a school teacher. Sharon Dornbeck is married to a pilot in the Air Force and has received a telegram reporting that he has been killed. Sandy Lawton was wed just two weeks before her lieutenant husband went off to Vietnam.

The three women travel to Paris together to attend a Vietnam peace conference. To their shock, a film is shown there depicting the atrocities committed by American soldiers against Vietnamese civilians. A horrified Mary Kay becomes an anti-war advocate, even testifying before a committee in Washington, D.C.

Mary Kay and Sharon's husbands are ultimately confirmed to be dead. Sandy's, however, is released in a weakened condition from a prisoner-of-war camp and she eagerly awaits his return home.

== Cast ==
- Kathleen Nolan as Mary Kay Beull
- Katherine Justice as Sharon Dornbeck
- Kate Jackson as Sandy Lawton
- Stuart Margolin as Phil Garrett

== See also ==
- List of American films of 1972
