= Satan's School for Girls (2000 film) =

- Genre: Drama; Horror
- Written by: Jennifer Maisel
- Directed by: Christopher Leitch
- Starring: Shannen Doherty; Julie Benz; Daniel Cosgrove; Taraji P. Henson; Kate Jackson
- Music by: Peter Manning Robinson
- Country of origin: United States
- Original language: English

Production
- Executive producers: Aaron Spelling; E. Duke Vincent
- Producers: Robert Berger; Murray Shostak
- Cinematography: Sergei Kozlov
- Editor: John Duffy
- Running time: 87 minutes
- Production company: Spelling Television

Original release
- Network: ABC
- Release: March 13, 2000

Satan's School for Girls is a 2000 American made-for-television horror film directed by Christopher Leitch and starring Shannen Doherty, Julie Benz, Daniel Cosgrove and Kate Jackson. The film premiered on ABC on March 13, 2000. It is a remake of a 1973 ABC Movie of the Week of the same name.

== Plot ==
The TV movie is about a woman, Beth Hammersmith, who attends Fallbridge College for Girls under the name Karen Oxford, to find out why her sister, who attended the college, is believed to have committed suicide. Once she is enrolled, she soon discovers a Satanic cult of witches, who call themselves "The Five", who want Beth to join the cult. The Dean is played by Kate Jackson, who portrayed the character of Roberta Lockhart in the original 1973 film.

== Cast ==
- Shannen Doherty as Beth Hammersmith/Karen Oxford
- Julie Benz as Alison Kingsley
- Daniel Cosgrove as Mark Lantch
- Richard Joseph Paul as Nick Delacroix
- Taraji P. Henson as Paige
- Aimée Castle as Courtney
- Mandy Schaffer as Hillary
- Victoria Sanchez as Lisa Bagley
- Kate Jackson as The Dean
- Irene Contogiorgis as Jenny Hammersmith
- Alan Fawcett as Ruben
- Jessica Goldapple as Kim
- Christian Paul as T.J.
- Adam MacDonald as Blake
- Jonathan Stark as Mr. Hammersmith

== Production ==
The film was directed by Christopher Leitch and is a remake of the 1973 version. The movie was also filmed in the city of Montreal, Quebec and the John Abbott College was used for the movie's campus.

== Release ==
The film first aired on March 13, 2000 on ABC.
