= Peter Marshall (footballer, born 1954) =

Australian rules footballer

Personal information
- Full name: Peter Marshall
- Born: 9 December 1954 (age 71)
- Original team: Preston
- Height: 171 cm (5 ft 7 in)
- Weight: 68 kg (150 lb)

Playing career^{1}
| Years | Club | Games (Goals) |
| 1977 | Collingwood | 4 (1) |
- ^{1} Playing statistics correct to the end of 1977.

Peter Marshall (born 9 December 1954) is a former Australian rules footballer who played with Collingwood in the Victorian Football League (VFL).
