= Kate Jackson =

American actress (born 1948)

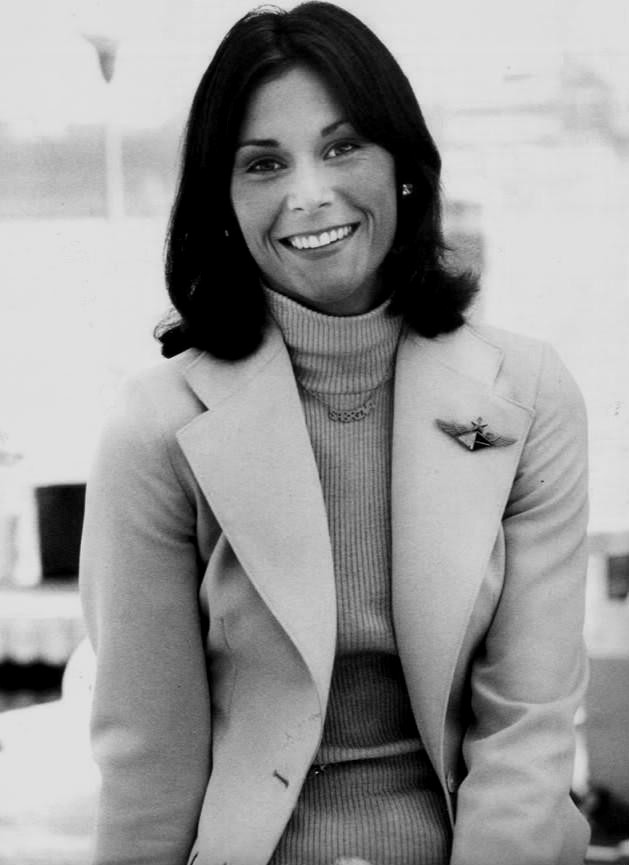
- Jackson in 1976
- Born: Lucy Kate Jackson; October 29, 1948 (age 77); Birmingham, Alabama, U.S.
- Education: University of Mississippi (withdrawn); Birmingham–Southern College (withdrawn); American Academy of Dramatic Arts
- Occupations: Actress; producer; director
- Years active: 1969–2007
- Known for: Charlie's Angels; Scarecrow and Mrs. King; Dark Shadows
- Spouses: Andrew Stevens (m. 1978; div. 1981); David Greenwald (m. 1982; div. 1984); Tom Hart (m. 1991; div. 1993)
- Partner: Edward Albert (mid-1970s)
- Children: 1

Lucy Kate Jackson (born October 29, 1948) is an American actress and television producer, known for her television roles as Sabrina Duncan in the series Charlie's Angels (1976–1979) and Amanda King in the series Scarecrow and Mrs. King (1983–1987). Her film roles include Making Love (1982) and Loverboy (1989). She is a three-time Emmy Award nominee and four-time Golden Globe Award nominee, and Photoplay award winner for Favorite TV Actress in 1978.

Jackson began her career in the late 1960s in summer stock, before landing major television roles in Dark Shadows (1970–1971) and The Rookies (1972–1976). She also appeared in the film Night of Dark Shadows (1971). The huge success of her role as Sabrina Duncan on Charlie's Angels saw her appear on the front cover of Time magazine, alongside co-stars Farrah Fawcett and Jaclyn Smith, while her role as Mrs. King won her Germany's Bravo Golden Otto Award for Best Female TV Star three times (1986–1988). She then continued to star in numerous television films, including Quiet Killer (1992), Empty Cradle (1993) and Satan's School for Girls (2000), a remake of the 1973 TV film of the same name in which she also starred.

== Early life ==
Kate Jackson was born in Birmingham, Alabama, the daughter of Ruth (née Shepherd) and Hogan Jackson, a business executive. She attended The Brooke Hill School for Girls while residing in Mountain Brook. Jackson went on to enroll at the University of Mississippi as a history major where she was a member of the Delta Rho chapter of the Kappa Kappa Gamma sorority. Halfway through her sophomore year, she transferred to Birmingham–Southern College, a liberal arts college, taking classes in speech and history of the theatre. At the end of the academic year, Jackson became an apprentice at the Stowe Playhouse in Stowe, Vermont, and then moved to New York City to study acting at the American Academy of Dramatic Arts.

== Career ==
Initially, Jackson worked as an NBC page and tour guide at the network's Rockefeller Center before landing a role as the mysterious, silent ghost Daphne Harridge on the 1960s supernatural daytime soap opera Dark Shadows. In 1971, Jackson had a starring role as Tracy Collins in Night of Dark Shadows, the second feature film based on the daytime serial. This film was more loosely based on the series than the first feature film House of Dark Shadows from the previous year, and it did not fare as well at the box office. The same year, she appeared in two episodes of the short-lived sitcom The Jimmy Stewart Show.

Jackson then appeared as nurse Jill Danko for four seasons on the 1970s crime drama The Rookies. A supporting cast member, Jackson filled her free time by studying directing and editing. She also appeared in several TV films during this period. Jackson's performance was well received in the 1972 independent film Limbo, one of the first theatrical films to address the Vietnam War and the wives of soldiers who were POWs, MIA or killed in action. She also appeared in Death Scream, a 1975 television dramatization of the circumstances surrounding the 1964 murder of Kitty Genovese.

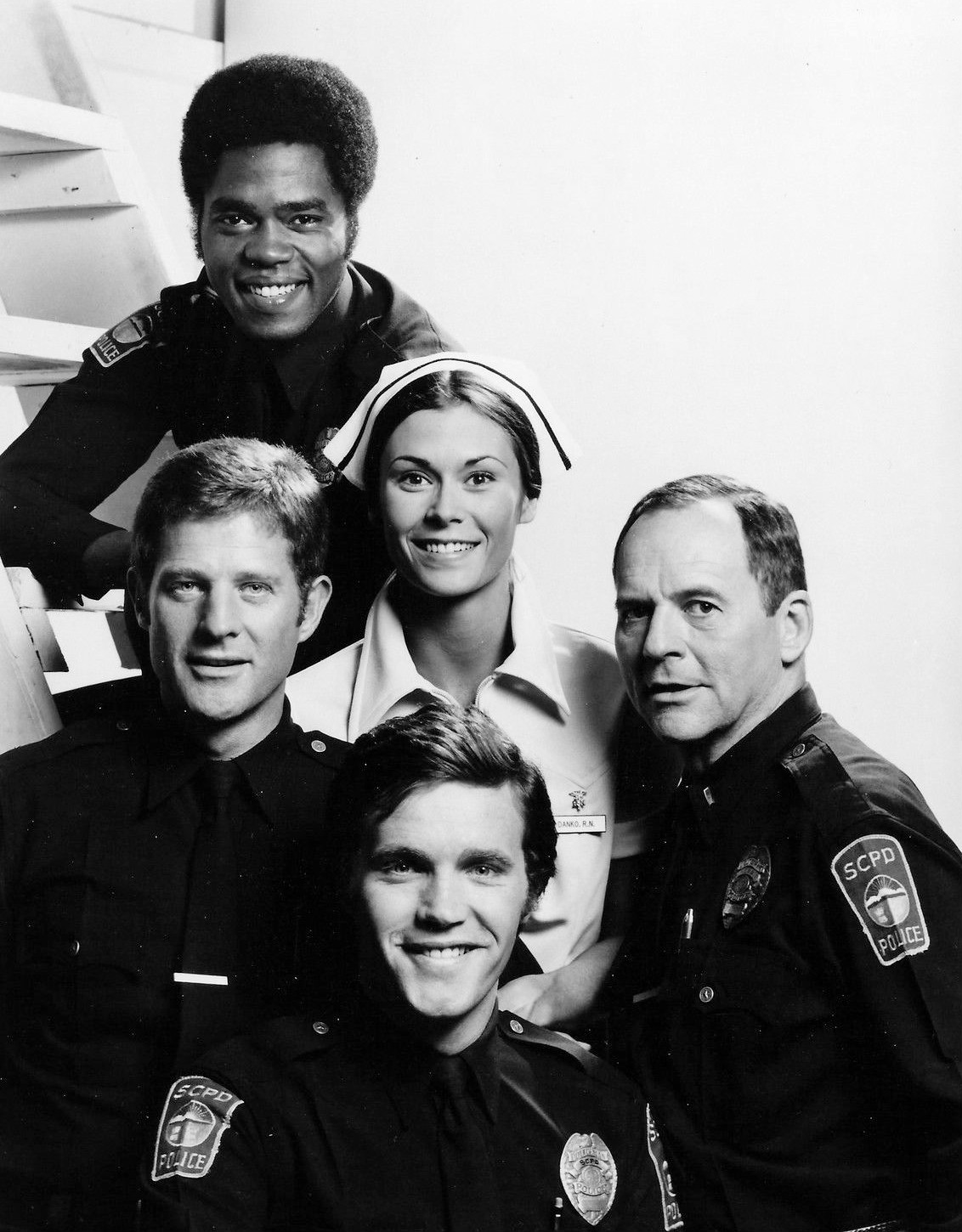
Cast photo of The Rookies. Clockwise from the top: Georg Stanford Brown (Terry Webster), Kate Jackson (Jill Danko), Gerald S. O'Loughlin (Eddie Ryker), Bruce Fairbairn (Chris Owens) and Sam Melville (Mike Danko) in 1975

In 1975, Jackson met with Rookies producers Aaron Spelling and Leonard Goldberg to discuss her contractual obligation to star in another television series for Spelling-Goldberg Productions upon that show's cancellation. Goldberg told her of a series that was available—because "every network has passed on it," The Alley Cats. Spelling said that when he told Jackson the title of the series had to be changed and asked her what she would like to call it, she replied "Charlie's Angels," pointing to a picture of three female angels on the wall behind Spelling. Jackson was originally cast as Kelly Garrett (which ultimately went to her co-star Jaclyn Smith), but decided upon Sabrina Duncan instead. The huge success of the show saw Jackson, Smith and Farrah Fawcett-Majors (who played Jill Munroe) appear on the front cover of Time magazine. The show aired as a television film on March 21, 1976, before debuting as a series on September 22, 1976. Because Jackson was considered the star of Charlie's Angels following her experience and four years on The Rookies, her original role of Kelly Garrett was featured prominently in the pilot film.

Jackson hosted the thirteenth episode of season four of Saturday Night Live which aired in February 1979. During her monologue, she referred to being an NBC page ten years earlier where she led tours of the studio. At the beginning of the third season of Charlie's Angels, Jackson was offered the Meryl Streep role of Joanna Stern Kramer in the feature film Kramer vs. Kramer (1979), but was forced to turn it down because Spelling told her that the show's shooting schedule could not be rearranged to give her time to do the film. At the end of the third season, Jackson left the show saying, "I served it well and it served me well, now it's time to go." Spelling cast Shelley Hack as her replacement Tiffany Welles (Hack was replaced by Tanya Roberts for the fifth and final season).

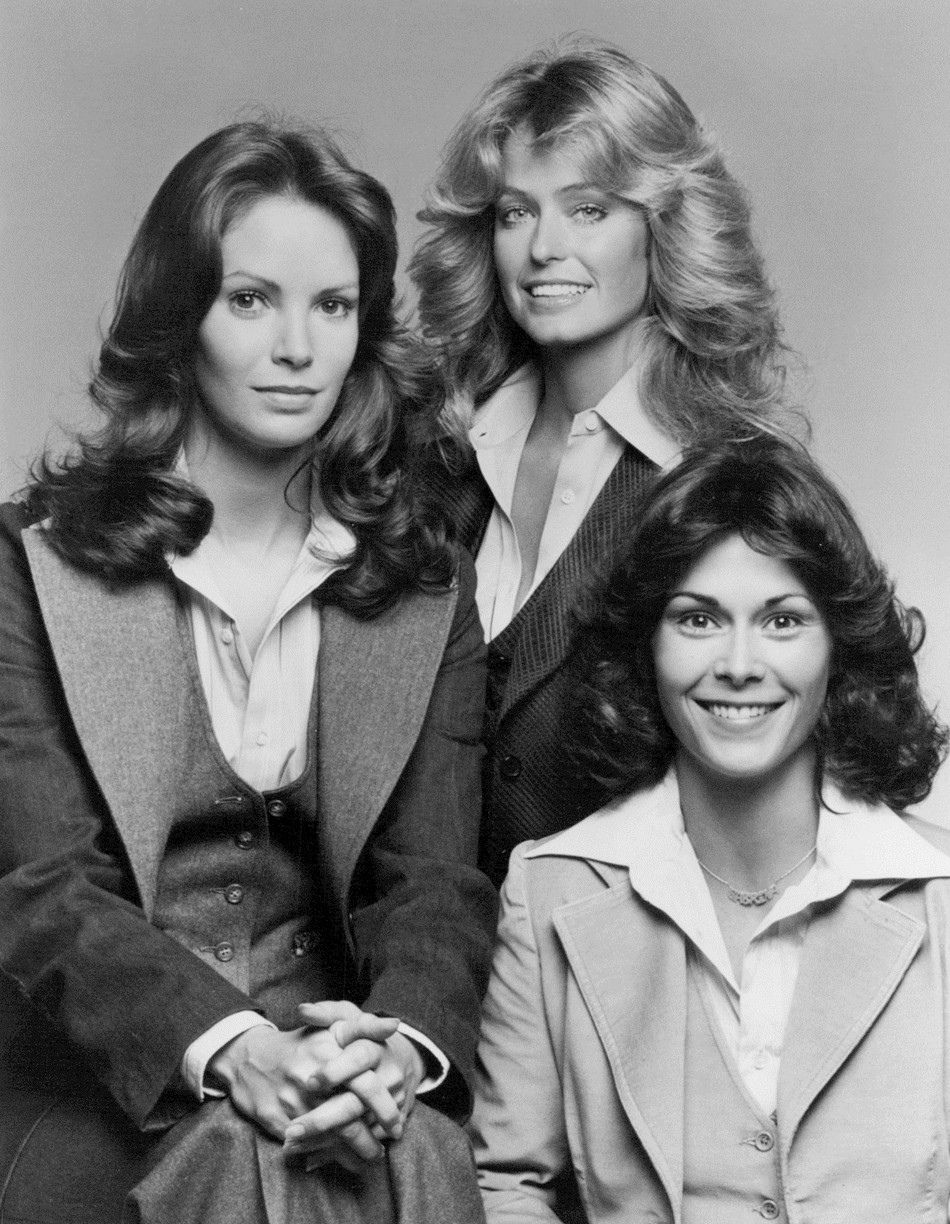
Charlie's Angels publicity photo (L-R): Jaclyn Smith, Farrah Fawcett and Kate Jackson in 1976

Jackson starred alongside Harry Hamlin and her Rookies co-star Michael Ontkean in the feature film Making Love (1982), directed by Arthur Hiller. It was a film some considered to be ahead of its time, and attempted to deal sensitively with the topic of homosexuality. However, it received tepid reviews and did poorly at the box office.

In 1983, Jackson had a starring role in Scarecrow and Mrs. King, a one-hour action drama in which she played housewife Amanda King opposite Bruce Boxleitner's spy Lee Stetson, code-named "Scarecrow." Jackson also co-produced the series with Warner Brothers Television through her production company, Shoot the Moon Enterprises. During this time she developed an interest in directing. Scarecrow and Mrs. King aired for four seasons from 1983 to 1987.

During filming of the show's fourth season, in January 1987, Jackson had a mammogram for the first time, which found a small malignant tumor. Her series' producer—the only person she told about the diagnosis—rescheduled her work on the show. She checked in to a hospital under an alias to have a lumpectomy. Jackson returned to the series a week later, working with the aid of painkillers through five weeks of radiation treatments.

After undergoing breast cancer treatment, Jackson followed up on Scarecrow and Mrs. King by taking on the main role in Baby Boom, a 1988 TV sitcom version of a 1987 film of the same name. The series lasted less than one season, canceled with episodes left unaired.

In 1989, Jackson starred in the film Loverboy, directed by Joan Micklin Silver.

In September 1989, another mammogram indicated residual breast cancer that the previous operation had missed. Jackson had a partial mastectomy and reconstructive surgery. Jackson's Charlie's Angels colleague Jaclyn Smith made statements indicating her support of Jackson.

In 1995, Jackson was diagnosed as having been born with an atrial septal defect that had previously gone undetected. Jackson underwent open-heart surgery to correct the defect.

Jackson spoke publicly about breast cancer and heart health and received the Power of Love Award in 2003 from the American Heart Association for raising awareness among the public regarding those issues.

In 2004, the television film Behind the Camera: The Unauthorized Story of Charlie's Angels aired, with actress Lauren Stamile portraying Jackson. In August 2006, Jackson, Farrah Fawcett and Jaclyn Smith, the three original Angels, made a surprise appearance together at the 58th Primetime Emmy Awards in a tribute to the recently deceased Angels creator Aaron Spelling.

In 2007, Jackson played Elizabeth Prentiss, the mother of FBI agent Emily Prentiss (Paget Brewster) on Criminal Minds, her last acting role to date. In August 2008, she was a guest judge on an episode of Jaclyn Smith's Bravo reality series Shear Genius, presiding over a hairdressing competition to update the original Charlie's Angels trio's signature hairdos.

On August 3, 2010, Gallery Books announced a contract with Jackson to publish her memoirs. The book, expected in 2011, has been repeatedly delayed, with the last update reporting a scheduled release for two days before 2021.

She has not appeared in film or television since 2009. However, during a Charlie's Angels panel at PaleyFest in 2026 she expressed an interest in returning to acting.

== Personal life ==
Jackson lived with actor Edward Albert in the mid-1970s. She was then linked romantically to actors Nick Nolte and Warren Beatty. After a six-month courtship, Jackson married actor Andrew Stevens (the son of actress Stella Stevens) in August 1978. The couple divorced in 1981. After her divorce from Stevens, Jackson said, "I felt as if my ex-husband drove up to my bank account with a Brink's truck." Jackson was then linked with actor Gary Pendergast and screenwriter Tom Mankiewicz. She married New York businessman David Greenwald in 1982, and they formed Shoot The Moon Productions together, the company that produced Jackson's series Scarecrow and Mrs. King. The couple divorced in 1984.

After the divorce, Jackson was frequently seen with dermatologist Arnold Klein. While recovering from her second bout with breast cancer and on vacation in Aspen, Colorado, in 1989, Jackson met Tom Hart, the owner of a Utah ski lodge, and the pair married in 1991. The couple lived both in Los Angeles and Park City, Utah. Jackson and Hart divorced in 1993. In 1995, Jackson adopted a son.

In May 2010, Jackson sued her financial advisor, Richard B. Francis, claiming his actions cost her more than $3 million ($4.4 million today) and brought her to financial ruin. The parties reached an undisclosed settlement in December 2010.

In August 2023, after many years out of the public eye, Jackson appeared as a guest at a wedding hosted by Jaclyn Smith for Smith's son Gaston in Los Angeles.

== Filmography ==
=== Film ===
Year	Title	Role
1971	Night of Dark Shadows	Tracy Collins
1972	Limbo	Sandy Lawton
1977	Thunder and Lightning	Nancy Sue Hunnicutt
1981	Dirty Tricks	Karen Polly Bishop
1982	Making Love	Claire Elliot
1989	Loverboy	Diane Bodek
1999	Error in Judgment	Shelley
2004	Larceny	Mom
2004	No Regrets	Suzanne Kennerly

=== Television films ===
Year	Title	Role	Notes
1972	The New Healers	Nurse Michelle Johnson	
1972	Movin' On	Cory	
1973	Satan's School for Girls	Roberta Lockhart	
1974	Killer Bees	Victoria Wells	
1974	Death Cruise	Mary Frances Radney	
1975	Death Scream	Carol	
1976	Death at Love House	Donna Gregory	
1979	Topper	Marion Kerby	
1981	Inmates: A Love Story	Jane Mount	
1981	Thin Ice	Linda Rivers	
1983	Listen to Your Heart	Frannie Greene	
1990	The Stranger Within	Mare Blackburn	
1992	Quiet Killer	Dr. Nora Hart	
1992	Homewrecker	Lucy	Voice
1993	Adrift	Katie Nast	
1993	Empty Cradle	Rita Donohue	
1994	Armed and Innocent	Patsy Holland	
1994	Justice in a Small Town	Sandra Clayton	
1995	The Silence of Adultery	Dr. Rachel Lindsey	
1996	The Cold Heart of a Killer	Jessie Arnold	
1996	A Kidnapping in the Family	DeDe Cooper	
1996	Panic in the Skies!	Laurie Ann Pickett	
1997	What Happened to Bobby Earl?	Rose Earl	
1998	Sweet Deception	Kit Gallagher	
2000	Satan's School for Girls	The Dean	
2001	A Mother's Testimony	Sharon Carlson	
2003	Miracle Dogs	Terri Logan	
2006	A Daughter's Conviction	Maureen Hansen	

=== Television series ===
Year	Title	Role	Notes
1970–1971	Dark Shadows	Daphne Harridge / Daphne Harridge Collins (PT)	Main role; 71 episodes
1971	The Jimmy Stewart Show	Janice Morton	2 episodes
1972	Bonanza	Ellen	Episode: "One Ace Too Many"
1972–1976	The Rookies	Jill Danko	92 episodes
1976–1979	Charlie's Angels	Sabrina Duncan	Main role; 73 episodes Nominated - Golden Globe Award for Best Actress – Television Series Drama; Nominated - Primetime Emmy Award for Outstanding Lead Actress in a Drama Series
1977	James at 15	Robin	Episode: "Pilot"; Nominated - Primetime Emmy Award for Outstanding Guest Actress in a Drama Series
1977	The San Pedro Beach Bums	Herself	Episode: "Angels and the Bums"
1979	Saturday Night Live	Herself (guest host)	Episode: "Kate Jackson/Delbert McClinton"
1983–1987	Scarecrow and Mrs. King	Amanda King	Main role Nominated - Golden Globe Award for Best Actress – Television Series Drama
1988–1989	Baby Boom	J.C. Wiatt	13 episodes
1992	The Boys of Twilight	Miss Dutton	Episode: "Pilot"
1993	Arly Hanks	Arly Hanks	Unsold TV pilot
1997	Ally McBeal	Barbara Cooker	Episode: "The Kiss"
1997	Dead Man's Gun	Katherine Morrison	Episode: "Death Warrant"
1999	Twice in a Lifetime	Julie Smith / Mildred	Episode: "Double Exposure"
1999	Batman Beyond	Bombshell	Voice, episode: "Mind Games"
2000	Chicken Soup for the Soul	Prof. Foley	Episode: "Making the Grade"
2002	The Zeta Project	Bombshell	Voice, episode: "Ro's Gift"
2002	Sabrina, the Teenage Witch	Candy King	Episode: "It's a Hot, Hot, Hot Hot Christmas"
2004	Third Watch	Jan Martin	2 episodes
2006	Family Guy	Amanda King	Voice, episode: "Deep Throats"
2006	American Dad!	Herself	Voice, episode: "Tears of a Clooney"
2007	Criminal Minds	Ambassador Elizabeth Prentiss	Episode: "Honor Among Thieves"
