= ABC Movie of the Week =

American TV anthology series (1969–75)

- Title card
- Country of origin: United States
- Original language: English

Production
- Running time: 90 minutes including commercials; 71–74 minutes excluding commercials

Original release
- Network: ABC
- Release: September 23, 1969 – May 14, 1975

The ABC Movie of the Week is an American weekly television anthology series featuring made-for-TV movies that aired on the ABC network in various permutations from 1969 to 1975.

== History ==
In the 1960s, movie studios viewed television as a second-rate medium but also as a threat to their theatrical revenue, so they charged high fees for the privilege to broadcast their films. The networks experimented with having films made specifically for TV to lower expenses. NBC created the first weekly umbrella for such films with their World Premiere Movie in 1966, running in a two-hour time slot.

Until the late 1960s, ABC ran a distant third behind rivals CBS and NBC, leading to jokes about it coming in fourth among the three networks or about its acronym meaning "Almost Broadcasting Company". Desperation and a looser corporate structure allowed ABC to consider plans that the other two networks would not. Barry Diller, then a junior executive at ABC and later a co-founder of the Fox network, is often cited as the creator of the Movie of the Week (MotW), although the concept was actually originated by producer Roy Huggins. Huggins reasoned that many older theatrical films ran shorter than 90 minutes so requiring a 120-minute time slot was unnecessary. His proposal was rejected by NBC and CBS but became the subject of a cover story in the March 21, 1968 issue of Variety magazine. ABC executives read the article and contacted Huggins, who did not want to sell the idea but could produce the series through Universal, where he was under contract. Universal demanded a larger budget than ABC wanted to spend, as well as the exclusive right to produce all future TV movies for ABC, conditions that pushed ABC to control production on their own, purchasing films from various studios and production companies. As the Variety article had effectively placed the concept into the public domain, ABC continued to develop it without Huggins' permission or involvement. ABC consoled Huggins by allowing him to produce several films, including The Young Country, precursor to Alias Smith and Jones. Michael Karol repeated the claim in his book The ABC Movie of the Week Companion: A Loving Tribute to the Classic Series that the Movie of the Week was Diller's idea, but this was based on hearsay.

The cover of the 2005 edition of The ABC Movie of the Week Companion shows the Zuni fetish doll from Trilogy of Terror (1975)

The shorter format allowed a smaller budget than two-hour TV movies. At $350,000 per film, it was less than half the budget of NBC's World Premiere movies. It featured the work of producers like Aaron Spelling, David Wolper and Harve Bennett (all of whom later developed hit series of their own), and was produced by different production companies such as Bing Crosby Productions and the network's own ABC Circle Films. Spelling was particularly prolific, producing films under his own credit as well as through Spelling-Goldberg Productions and Thomas-Spelling Productions (partly owned by Danny Thomas).

The MotW provided ABC with a ratings hit and, along with Monday Night Football, helped establish the network as a legitimate competitor to rivals CBS and NBC. The films themselves varied in quality and were often escapist or sensationalistic in nature (suspense, horror and melodrama were staples), but some were critically well received. For example, Duel (1971), based on a Richard Matheson short story from Playboy, was director Steven Spielberg's first feature film, catapulting his career and enabling him to move from television to theatrical films.

ABC earned four Emmys, a Peabody Award and citations from the NAACP and American Cancer Society for an airing of Brian's Song in 1972. The 1971–72 season of the series finished as the fifth highest rated series of the year.

The series was documented by Michael Karol in his 2005 book, The ABC Movie of the Week Companion: A Loving Tribute to the Classic Series, which was updated in 2008 (ISBN 1-60528-023-2), and by Michael McKenna in The ABC Movie of the Week: Big Movies for the Small Screen.

== Time slots ==
The MotW originally aired on Tuesday nights at 8:30 pm Eastern/7:30 pm Central. Established series The Mod Squad acted as a lead-in from 7:30 to 8:30, bringing the younger demographic. The shorter running time of the film freed the 10 p.m. time slot for a full 60-minute program, initially Marcus Welby, M.D. during the first season. Starting earlier at 8:30 could also prevent viewers from switching to competing movies at 9:00. Beginning with the 1971 season, ABC added a second MotW on Saturday night and adjusted the titles of the shows to Movie of the Week and Movie of the Weekend. The following season, the Saturday installment was moved to Wednesday night, and the titles were adjusted to Tuesday Movie of the Week and Wednesday Movie of the Week.

During the 1973–74 season, ABC added a third movie to its schedule on Saturday nights, this time titled the ABC Suspense Movie, and usually consisting of thriller, mystery and horror type films (some of which were reruns of movies which had originally aired as Movies of the Week).

== Title sequence ==
The title sequence was designed by Harry Marks and animated by Douglas Trumbull using the slit-scan process that he had created for 2001: A Space Odyssey.

The accompanying theme music was an orchestral version of "Nikki", a song composed by Burt Bacharach and named for his daughter. The theme was chosen by Marks and arranged by Harry Betts.

Over the music was narration voiced by Dick Tufeld. "The Movie of the Week. Presenting the world premiere of an original motion picture produced especially for ABC (or 'for the Movie of the Week' in some seasons)." That would be followed by a promotional teaser for the movie.

The opening for Movie of the Weekend featured footage of a silhouetted "rotating cameraman" operating a 35 mm movie camera (). This footage would later be utilized as the opening of ABC's New York City television station WABC-TV's various movie umbrellas beginning around 1972–73, including and especially its weekday afternoon movie showcase The 4:30 Movie.

== TV series pilots ==
The series was often used as a platform to show pilots for possible series for the network. It allowed the network to air pilots that it had already commissioned and paid for but had not ordered as regular series. As well, pilots that had already been sold as ongoing series or were being tested such as Kung Fu, The Six Million Dollar Man, Starsky & Hutch, Longstreet, Toma, Alias Smith and Jones and Get Christie Love! premiered here and returned on the regular schedule after minor to major alterations to the premise and/or cast. Other programs are sometimes mistakenly believed to have aired under the Movie of the Week banner. Marcus Welby, M.D., for example, premiered after Seven in Darkness and was the lead-out for the Tuesday installment. Still others, like Earth II and Robert Conrad's version of Nick Carter were actually shown on other movie series, such as The ABC Sunday Night Movie.

== Actors ==
Most of the actors in non-recurring roles appeared only once or twice in the series. Notable exceptions who appeared in three or more films as different characters include Doug McClure, Darren McGavin, Dennis Weaver, Clint Walker, Earl Holliman, Leonard Nimoy, Robert Culp, Barbara Eden, Larry Hagman, Elizabeth Montgomery, Donna Mills, Ed Nelson, Ken Berry, Connie Stevens, Lee Majors, James Brolin, Lloyd Bridges, Cloris Leachman, Ricardo Montalbán, Richard Anderson, Lesley Anne Warren, Janet Leigh, John Marley, Kay Lenz, William Schallert, Ted Bessell, Karen Valentine, Ben Murphy, Lee Grant, Barra Grant, Myrna Loy, Carl Betz, Henry Jones, Farrah Fawcett, Dina Merrill, Stefanie Powers, Jessica Walter, Kathleen Quinlan and William Windom.

Many of the telefilms had actors credited as guest stars, special guest stars and "special appearance by", even if the movie was not a pilot for a series. Death Race and The Weekend Nun billed their lead actors as special guest stars. In the unique case of Assault on the Wayne, all of the first-billed cast members were credited as guest stars.

== End ==
The series proper ended in 1975 as ABC's ratings collapsed that season. Analysts laid part of the blame on ABC's overreliance on the MotW, which had suffered from ratings fatigue and a perceived drop in quality despite some notable films. The latter was symptomized by an increased number of pilots as well as remakes and variations of established intellectual properties, such as The Swiss Family Robinson, The Mark of Zorro, The Hatfields and the McCoys and Matt Helm. After that, ABC's made-for-TV movies were aired either as stand-alone specials or shown in time slots that included both original and theatrical movie presentations, notably the ABC Friday Night Movie and the ABC Sunday Night Movie. The Tuesday Movie of the Week would later be incorporated as part of ABC Late Night, a replacement of ABC's Wide World of Entertainment that ran from 1976 to 1982; the late-night version would mainly feature repeats of movies, both made for television and traditional theatrical releases, that were previously seen on ABC and other networks. ABC continued to premiere new TV films on Sunday nights in prime time until 2005.

During the 1970s, ABC's local owned-and-operated stations (in a few of the nation's biggest cities; at the time, they all broadcast on channel 7) featured The 4:30 Movie on weekday afternoons (the actual time varied by city, but generally after ABC's morning/midday game shows and soap operas); it featured mainly major Hollywood theatrical releases, but some installments of the Movie of the Week were also rebroadcast here.

In the mid-1970s, a number of the films were rebroadcast on The CBS Late Movie.

== Filmography ==
=== Nielsen ratings ===
Season	Episodes	First aired	Last aired	Rank	Nielsen rating
1	25	September 23, 1969	March 17, 1970	#22	20.9
2	25	September 22, 1970	April 6, 1971	#6	25.1
3	44	September 14, 1971	March 7, 1972	#5	25.5
4	47	September 12, 1972	March 21, 1973	#17 (Tuesday) #22 (Wednesday)	21.4 (Tue) 20.0 (Wed)
5	70	September 11, 1973	May 7, 1974	#21 (Tuesday) #48 (Wednesday) #72 (Saturday)	21.0 (Tue) 17.2 (Wed) 12.9 (Sat)
6	43	September 10, 1974	May 14, 1975	#47 (Tuesday) #38 (Wednesday)	17.6 (Tue) 18.7 (Wed)

=== Cast notes ===
to lists below

*	Credited as guest star
**	Credited as special guest star
***	Credited as "special appearance by"

=== Season 1: 1969–70 ===
No.	Movie	Title	Genre	Air date	Weekday
1	1.01	Seven in Darkness	Drama	September 23, 1969	Tuesday
Seven survivors of a plane crash, all of them blind, must make their way out of the wilderness without any help. Starring: Milton Berle, Dina Merrill, Barry Nelson, Arthur O'Connell, Alejandro Rey, Lesley Ann Warren
2	1.02	The Immortal	Science fiction	September 30, 1969	Tuesday
A man flees from a dying billionaire after his blood is found to provide almost miraculous healing and life extension properties. Starring: Christopher George, Carol Lynley*, Barry Sullivan*, Jessica Walter*, Ralph Bellamy* Pilot for the 1970-71 TV series of the same name; nominated for one Emmy Award.
3	1.03	The Over-the-Hill Gang	Western-comedy	October 7, 1969	Tuesday
Four elderly Texas Rangers come out of retirement to oust the corrupt crime boss mayor of a frontier town. Starring: Walter Brennan, Pat O'Brien*, Edgar Buchanan*, Chill Wills*, Edward Andrews*, Jack Elam*, Andy Devine*, Gypsy Rose Lee*, Ricky Nelson* Unsold pilot; followed by The Over-the-Hill Gang Rides Again (2.08)
4	1.04	Wake Me When the War Is Over	Comedy	October 14, 1969	Tuesday
A German baroness hides a bumbling Air Force airman during World War II, then stages an ongoing "war" to keep him from learning that the war has ended. Starring: Ken Berry, Eva Gabor, Werner Klemperer, Jim Backus**, Danielle De Metz
5	1.05	The Monk	Mystery/Action	October 21, 1969	Tuesday
Unlicensed private investigator Gus Monk is entangled in a scheme involving a Mob-connected lawyer who claims his boss is out to kill him. Starring: George Maharis, Janet Leigh, Rick Jason, Carl Betz*, Jack Albertson**, Raymond St. Jacques***, William Smithers, Jack Soo, Mary Wickes Unsold pilot. Story by Blake Edwards, based on characters he created.
6	1.06	The Young Lawyers	Legal drama	October 28, 1969	Tuesday
A Boston attorney leaves to take control of a legal aid program staffed by students. Their first case is to defend two Black men accused of robbing and beating a cab driver. Starring: Jason Evers, Judy Pace, Zalman King, Tom Fielding, Anjanette Comer*, Keenan Wynn*, James Shigeta*, Richard Pryor*, Dick Bass*, Michael Parks**, George Macready***, Louise Latham***, Barry Atwater***, Georg Stanford Brown*** Partly recast and returned as a series in the 1970-71 TV season.
7	1.07	The Pigeon	Crime thriller	November 4, 1969	Tuesday
A private investigator tries to protect a woman and her mother who are secretly hiding from the Mob. Starring: Sammy Davis, Jr., Dorothy Malone, Victoria Vetri, Ricardo Montalbán**, Pat Boone***, Roy Glenn, Patsy Kelly, Norman Alden
8	1.08	The Spy Killer	Espionage thriller	November 11, 1969	Tuesday
Former government assassin turned private investigator John Smith finds himself caught in a web of deceit involving a notebook containing a list of names of spies. Starring: Robert Horton, Jill St. John, Sebastian Cabot, Lee Montague, Eleanor Summerfield, Barbara Shelley Unsold pilot. Screenplay by and produced by Jimmy Sangster, based on his novel, Private I. Filmed at Pinewood Studios and on location in London. The three main characters were reworked into another pilot, Foreign Exchange (1.17).
9	1.09	The Ballad of Andy Crocker	Drama	November 18, 1969	Tuesday
A Vietnam veteran returning home finds that he has lost his girlfriend, his business and his sense of purpose. Starring: Lee Majors, Joey Heatherton, Jimmy Dean*, Bobby Hatfield*, Marvin Gaye*, Agnes Moorhead**, Pat Hingle** Unsold pilot.
10	1.10	In Name Only	Romantic Comedy Anthology	November 25, 1969	Tuesday
Struggling wedding consultants desperately try to get three couples legally married after finding out they accidentally had an actor officiate the original weddings. Starring: Michael Callan, Ann Prentiss, Eve Arden**, Ruth Buzzi**, Christopher Connelly,** Bill Daily**, Elinor Donahue**, Herb Edelman**, Paul Ford,** Elsa Lanchester** Produced and directed by E.W. Swackhamer. Written by Bernard Slade.
11	1.11	Three's a Crowd	Romantic comedy	December 2, 1969	Tuesday
Believing his wife died, a man remarries, but when she returns years later, the accidental bigamist tries to keep his secret from both wives. Starring: Larry Hagman, E. J. Peaker, Jessica Walter, Harvey Korman, Farrah Fawcett, Norman Fell
12	1.12	Daughter of the Mind	Thriller	December 9, 1969	Tuesday
At the request of a colleague, a psychologist/ESP researcher investigates a leading cybernetic expert's claim that he has seen and spoken with his young daughter, Mary, who died 13 weeks before. Starring: Don Murray, Ray Milland, Gene Tierney, Pamelyn Ferdin, Ed Asner, John Carradine Based on the book The Hand of Mary Constable (1964) by Paul Gallico.
13	1.13	The Silent Gun	Western	December 16, 1969	Tuesday
After nearly shooting an innocent, a famed gunslinger gives up violence but has to find a way to save a frontier town. Starring: Lloyd Bridges, John Beck, Ed Begley, Sr., Edd Byrnes, Pernell Roberts, Susan Howard Based on a concept by Bob Kane.
14	1.14	Honeymoon with a Stranger	Thriller	December 23, 1969	Tuesday
An American woman honeymooning in Spain suspects foul play when her wealthy husband disappears, but when the police investigate, a stranger appears, claiming to be the man. Starring: Janet Leigh, Rossano Brazzi, Cesare Danova, Eric Braeden, Barbara Steele
15	1.15	Gidget Grows Up	Comedy	December 30, 1969	Tuesday
After breaking up with Moondoggie, Gidget becomes a United Nations tour guide and begins a love affair with an older Australian agriculture consultant. Starring: Karen Valentine, Edward Mulhare, Paul Peterson, Warner Anderson**, Bob Cummings**, Nina Foch**, Paul Lynde** Unsold pilot; followed by Gidget Gets Married (3.27).
16	1.16	Black Water Gold	Adventure/drama	January 6, 1970	Tuesday
Independent scholars try to find a long lost Spanish galleon while an unscrupulous, wealthy thief shadows them to get the treasure for himself. Starring: Keir Dullea, Bradford Dillman, France Nuyen, Aron Kincaid, Lana Wood, Jacques Aubuchon, Paul Hampton, Ricardo Montalbán** Produced, directed and story by Alan Landsburg. Filmed on location in the Bahamas.
17	1.17	Foreign Exchange	Espionage thriller	January 13, 1970	Tuesday
Former government agent turned private investigator John Smith agrees to participate in a scheme to be captured by the Soviets and exchanged for a double agent that the West wants to plant high in the KGB. Starring: Robert Horton, Jill St. John, Sebastian Cabot, Eric Pohlmann, Dudley Foster, Eleanor Summerfield Unsold pilot. Screenplay by and produced by Jimmy Sangster, based on his novel, Foreign Exchange. Filmed at Pinewood Studios and on location in London. This is a soft reboot of The Spy Killer (1.08) with the events of the earlier pilot completely ignored. John Smith is reintroduced as a traditional spy rather than a counterintelligence assassin.
18	1.18	Carter's Army	Action	January 27, 1970	Tuesday
A racist commando must lead an all-African-American squad of misfits on a secret mission in Nazi Germany. Starring: Stephen Boyd, Robert Hooks, Susan Oliver, Roosevelt Grier**, Moses Gunn**, Richard Pryor**, Billy Dee Williams**, Glynn Turman**, Paul Stewart** Also known as Black Brigade.
19	1.19	Along Came a Spider	Revenge	February 3, 1970	Tuesday
An archeologist creates a fake identity for herself and stages "her" murder in a complicated ploy to frame a physics professor who she believes killed her husband and stole his research. Starring: Suzanne Pleshette, Ed Nelson, Andrew Prine, Brooke Bundy, Richard Anderson
20	1.20	The Challenge	Drama	February 10, 1970	Tuesday
A disgraced U.S. soldier and big game hunter is recruited to fight a one-on-one war of "surrogates" against his Asian counterpart, the nations vying to win salvage rights to a sunken nuclear-armed satellite. Starring: Darren McGavin, Mako, Broderick Crawford, James Whitmore**, Skip Homeier, Sam Elliott
21	1.21	The Unfinished Journey of Robert Kennedy	Documentary	February 17, 1970	Tuesday
A documentary tracing the political life and career of Robert F. Kennedy. Starring: John Huston (narrator) Written by Arthur M. Schlesinger Jr. The only non-fiction documentary aired as a Movie of the Week
22	1.22	Quarantined	Medical drama	February 24, 1970	Tuesday
Conflict and crises at a hospital run by a medical patriarch and his three sons – all doctors – including a cholera outbreak and a movie star with kidney failure. Starring: Gary Collins, John Dehner, Susan Howard, Gordon Pinsent, Dan Ferrone, Wally Cox*, Sam Jaffe*, Terry Moore*, Sharon Farrell** Unsold pilot.
23	1.23	Mister Jerico	Heist	March 3, 1970	Tuesday
Suave con artist Dudley Jerico and his sidekick scheme to steal a $2 million diamond from a tycoon, but they find they have competition. Starring: Patrick Macnee, Connie Stevens, Herbert Lom, Marty Allen Unsold pilot. Location filming in Malta with studio filming at Elstree Studios. Theme song sung by Lulu.
24	1.24	The Love War	Science fiction/action	March 10, 1970	Tuesday
Teams of benevolent and hostile aliens compete in a contest for dominion of Earth, but one falls in love with a woman he meets on a bus. Starring: Lloyd Bridges, Angie Dickinson**, Daniel J. Travanti (as Dan Travanty), Harry Basch
25	1.25	The Young Country	Western	March 17, 1970	Tuesday
Double-crosses abound as various people try to get $38,000 that was embezzled from a Santa Fe bank. Starring: Roger Davis, Pete Duel, Walter Brennan, Joan Hackett, Wally Cox Character names were reused with a new premise to create the movie Alias Smith and Jones (2.13).

=== Season 2: 1970–71 ===
No.	Mov	Title	Genre	Air date	Weekday
26	2.01	How Awful About Allan	Thriller	September 22, 1970	Tuesday
A man blinded by guilt comes home to live with his sister, but a mysterious boarder may be trying to kill him. Starring: Anthony Perkins, Julie Harris, Joan Hackett, Kent Smith, Robert H. Harris Based on a novel by Henry Farrell.
27	2.02	Night Slaves	Science fiction	September 29, 1970	Tuesday
A man with a steel plate in his skull sees everyone else in a town he is visiting leave in a trance-like state every night. Starring: James Franciscus, Lee Grant, Leslie Nielsen**, Tisha Sterling. Based on a novel by Jerry Sohl.
28	2.03	But I Don't Want to Get Married!	Romantic comedy	October 6, 1970	Tuesday
A recent widower with two sons finds himself juggling several women at once. Starring: Herschel Bernardi, Brandon Cruz, Harry Morgan, Nanette Fabray, Jerry Paris, Shirley Jones**
29	2.04	The Old Man Who Cried Wolf	Mystery	October 13, 1970	Tuesday
An elderly man sees a close friend beaten to death, but all witnesses contradict him, the police won't believe him and his son suspects him of paranoia. Starring: Edward G. Robinson, Diane Baker, Ruth Roman, Percy Rodrigues, Sam Jaffe, Martin Balsam**, Edward Asner, Martin E. Brooks, Virginia Christine
30	2.05	Wild Women	Western	October 20, 1970	Tuesday
With war with Mexico looming, a secret mission to deliver weapons and map a new supply route is run on a wagon train with disguised Army engineers and boisterous female Army prisoners posing as their wives. Starring: Hugh O'Brian, Anne Francis, Marilyn Maxwell, Marie Windsor, Sherry Jackson Unsold pilot.
31	2.06	The House That Would Not Die	Horror	October 27, 1970	Tuesday
A woman who has inherited an old Georgetown manor learns that her family property is a breeding ground for the supernatural. Starring: Barbara Stanwyck, Richard Egan, Michael Anderson Jr., Kitty Winn Based on the novel Ammie Come Home by Barbara Michaels.
32	2.07	Tribes	Drama	November 10, 1970	Tuesday
A Marine drill instructor comes to respect a pacifistic hippie draftee. Starring: Darren McGavin, Jan-Michael Vincent, Earl Holliman Directed by Emmy Award winner Joseph Sargent.
33	2.08	The Over-the-Hill Gang Rides Again	Western/comedy	November 17, 1970	Tuesday
Three of the gang reunite to help a geriatric comrade, especially after he becomes marshal of Waco and has to face down bank robbers. Starring: Walter Brennan, Edgar Buchanan, Chill Wills, Andy Devine, Fred Astaire**, Parley Baer, Walter Burke, Lana Wood Unsold pilot; the sequel to The Over-the-Hill Gang (1.03).
34	2.09	Crowhaven Farm	Thriller	November 24, 1970	Tuesday
After inheriting a farm near Salem, a woman learns that she is being targeted for revenge by a coven of witches for the actions of her previous incarnation. Starring: Hope Lange, Paul Burke, Lloyd Bochner, John Carradine, Cyril Delevanti, Milton Selzer, Patricia Barry
35	2.10	Run, Simon, Run	Revenge tragedy	December 1, 1970	Tuesday
A Papago man just released from prison seeks revenge on the former partner who murdered his brother and framed him for the crime after the three men found turquoise. Starring: Burt Reynolds, Inger Stevens, Royal Dano, James Best, Rodolfo Acosta, Eddie Little Sky, Don Dubbins
36	2.11	Weekend of Terror	Thriller	December 8, 1970	Tuesday
Kidnappers accidentally kill their victim before they can collect the ransom, then abduct three nuns from a car to stand-in to convince the victim's father that she is still alive. Starring: Robert Conrad, Lee Majors, Lois Nettleton, Carol Lynley, Jane Wyatt
37	2.12	The Man Who Wanted to Live Forever	Thriller	December 15, 1970	Tuesday
A heart surgeon hired to do research by an ailing magnate finds his benefactor wants to steal human hearts to keep on living ... including his own. Starring: Stuart Whitman, Sandy Dennis, Burl Ives**
38	2.13	Alias Smith and Jones	Western	January 5, 1971	Tuesday
Two notorious outlaws work to earn amnesty, but their former gang has other plans for the bank where they are employed. Starring: Pete Duel, Ben Murphy, Forrest Tucker, Susan Saint James, James Drury, Jeanette Nolan, Earl Holliman** Reuses character names from The Young Country (1.25). Pilot for the 1971-73 TV series of the same name that premiered two weeks later.
39	2.14	Assault on the Wayne	Thriller	January 12, 1971	Tuesday
Cold War intrigue with traitors trying to steal top secret anti-ballistic missile controls being tested on a U.S. nuclear submarine. Starring: Leonard Nimoy*, Joseph Cotten*, William Windom*, Keenan Wynn*, Lloyd Haynes*, Dewey Martin*, Malachi Throne, Ron Masak Reuses submarine footage from Ice Station Zebra, a theatrical film which Ron Masak also appeared in.
40	2.15	Dr. Cook's Garden	Thriller	January 19, 1971	Tuesday
A medical intern visiting his home town comes to believe his mentor, the town's doctor, is murdering troublesome residents with poison. Starring: Bing Crosby, Frank Converse, Blythe Danner**, Barnard Hughes, Bethel Leslie Directed by Ted Post.
41	2.16	The Feminist and the Fuzz	Romantic comedy	January 26, 1971	Tuesday
A feminist pediatrician and a chivalrous cop butt heads as roommates in San Francisco. Starring: Barbara Eden, David Hartman, Julie Newmar**, Jo Anne Worley, Farrah Fawcett**, Harry Morgan**, John McGiver**, Herb Edelman**
42	2.17	The Point!	Animated Musical	February 2, 1971	Tuesday
A bedtime story about a round-headed boy facing intolerance in a society where everything and everyone has a point. Starring the voices of: Dustin Hoffman (first broadcast), Alan Thicke (third broadcast), Mike Lookinland, Paul Frees, Lennie Weinrib, Bill Martin, Buddy Foster, Joan Gerber Personal project for Harry Nilsson, who wrote the fable and the songs, co-wrote the story and was one of the producers.
43	2.18	Love Hate Love	Thriller	February 9, 1971	Tuesday
A former fashion model is stalked by a relentless, violent playboy she had a fling with before her wedding. Starring: Ryan O'Neal, Lesley Ann Warren, Peter Haskell, Henry Jones, Jeff Donnell, Jack Mullaney, Stanley Adams
44	2.19	Maybe I'll Come Home in the Spring	Drama	February 16, 1971	Tuesday
A young woman returns to her parents' suburban home after a year of living with hippies and discovers her younger sister is following in her footsteps, wanting the idealistic hippie life. Starring: Sally Field, Eleanor Parker, Jackie Cooper, Lane Bradbury, David Carradine Title song sung by Linda Ronstadt.
45	2.20	Longstreet	Mystery	February 23, 1971	Tuesday
Insurance investigator Mike Longstreet searches for the culprit who bombed his home, killing his wife and leaving him blind. Starring: James Franciscus, Martine Beswick*, Bradford Dillman*, John McIntire*, Jeanette Nolan*, Barry Russo Pilot for the 1971-72 TV series of the same name that premiered on CBS the following season. Stirling Silliphant was the writer and executive producer. Produced and directed by Joseph Sargent.
46	2.21	Yuma	Western	March 2, 1971	Tuesday
Yuma's new marshal finds himself facing a vengeful rancher, as well as a scheme to steal supplies meant for Indian reservations. Starring: Clint Walker, Barry Sullivan, Edgar Buchanan, Kathryn Hays, Morgan Woodward, Robert Phillips, Miguel Alejandro
47	2.22	River of Gold	Action adventure	March 9, 1971	Tuesday
Unsold pilot about beach bums searching for buried treasure. Starring: Suzanne Pleshette, Dack Rambo, Ray Milland, Roger Davis, Melissa Newman
48	2.23	In Search of America	Drama	March 23, 1971	Tuesday
A college dropout convinces his parents and grandmother to join him in an old bus converted into a motorhome on a journey of self-discovery to a hippie music festival, where he falls in love with gravely ill girl. Starring: Carl Betz, Vera Miles, Jeff Bridges, Ruth McDevitt, Michael Anderson, Jr.*, Howard Duff*, Kim Hunter*, Renne Jarrett*, Sal Mineo*, Tyne Daly Unsold pilot.
49	2.24	The Sheriff	Crime drama	March 30, 1971	Tuesday
An African American sheriff tries to prove that a racist raped a young black girl. Starring: Ossie Davis, Kaz Garas, Kyle Johnson, John Marley*, Edward Binns*, Lynda Day George*, Ruby Dee*, Moses Gunn*, Ross Martin*, Brenda Sykes* Unsold pilot.
50	2.25	Escape	Action/science fiction	April 6, 1971	Tuesday
A famed escape artist has to find a kidnapped scientist who has developed a biological agent that can turn humanity into mindless slaves. Starring: Christopher George, Avery Schreiber, Marlyn Mason*, William Windom*, John Vernon*, William Schallert*, Gloria Grahame* Unsold pilot. Produced by Bruce Lansbury, who would create the similar TV series The Magician for CBS in 1973-74.

=== Season 3: 1971–72 ===
No.	Mov	Title	Genre	Air date	Weekday
51	3.01	The Forgotten Man	Drama	September 14, 1971	Tuesday
A Vietnam War POW, returning home after five years of captivity and interrogation, finds that his wife has remarried, his whole world has changed and he is beginning to suffer PTSD flashbacks. Starring: Dennis Weaver, Anne Francis, Lois Nettleton, Pamelyn Ferdin, Percy Rodriguez, Andrew Duggan, James Hong
52	3.02	The Birdmen	Action adventure	September 18, 1971	Saturday
An OSS officer tasked with smuggling a nuclear physicist out of Nazi Germany plots to fly themselves out of a POW camp located in a mountain castle using a handbuilt glider. Starring: Doug McClure, Rene Auberjonois, Richard Basehart, Max Baer Jr., Chuck Connors, Tom Skerritt Fictionalized story based on the account of the Colditz Cock. Released as a feature film overseas as Escape of the Birdmen.
53	3.03	Congratulations, It's a Boy!	Comedy	September 21, 1971	Tuesday
A swinging bachelor has to grow up after a young adult illegitimate son that he did not know about shows up and wants to spend time with him. Starring: Bill Bixby, Diane Baker, Jack Albertson*, Ann Sothern*, Karen Jensen, Darrell Larson, Jeff Donnell, Tom Bosley, Robert H. Harris, Judy Strangis
54	3.04	The Deadly Dream	Suspense	September 25, 1971	Saturday
An overworked researcher questions reality when people, places and events from a recurring dream where he is pursued and persecuted for an unknown crime start appearing in the real world. Starring: Lloyd Bridges, Janet Leigh, Leif Erickson, Carl Betz, Don Stroud, Richard Jaeckel
55	3.05	Five Desperate Women	Thriller	September 28, 1971	Tuesday
Former girls' school classmates having a reunion on a private island realize that either of the male staffers may be a murderous escaped convict. Starring: Robert Conrad**, Anjanette Comer, Bradford Dillman, Joan Hackett, Denise Nicholas, Stefanie Powers, Julie Sommars
56	3.06	Sweet, Sweet Rachel	Thriller	October 2, 1971	Saturday
An ESP researcher investigates mysterious happenings surrounding a widow to find out if she is being gaslighted by someone with psychic powers. Starring: Alex Dreier, Stefanie Powers**, Pat Hingle, Louise Latham, Steve Ihnat, Brenda Scott, Chris Robinson Concept heavily reworked and recast to create the 1972 TV series The Sixth Sense.
57	3.07	The Last Child	Drama	October 5, 1971	Tuesday
In an overpopulated future U.S. with a one-child policy, an expectant couple who had previously lost a newborn try to flee to Canada with the help of a former US senator. Starring: Michael Cole, Harry Guardino, Janet Margolin, Edward Asner, Van Heflin**, Barbara Babcock
58	3.08	Thief	Drama	October 9, 1971	Saturday
An urbane burglar struggles to raise money to cover his gambling debts and regain custody of his son. Starring: Richard Crenna, Angie Dickinson, Cameron Mitchell, Hurd Hatfield, Robert Webber**
59	3.09	A Taste of Evil	Thriller	October 12, 1971	Tuesday
After years in a psychiatric hospital, an heiress returns to her family mansion and realizes that someone is deliberately trying to drive her insane. Starring: Barbara Stanwyck, Barbara Parkins, Roddy McDowall, William Windom, Arthur O'Connell
60	3.10	In Broad Daylight	Thriller	October 16, 1971	Saturday
A blinded movie star disguises himself as a sighted man in order to murder his cheating wife and frame her lover for the crime. Starring: Richard Boone, Suzanne Pleshette, John Marley, Stella Stevens**, Fred Beir, Whit Bissell
61	3.11	Suddenly Single	Drama	October 19, 1971	Tuesday
A newly divorced middle-aged man finds himself torn between two women, a young free spirit and a mature real estate agent. Starring: Hal Holbrook, Barbara Rush, Margot Kidder, Agnes Moorehead, Michael Constantine, Harvey Korman, Cloris Leachman
62	3.12	Death Takes a Holiday	Drama	October 23, 1971	Saturday
Death takes human form and falls in love with a woman who was supposed to die, so people stop dying. Starring: Yvette Mimieux, Monte Markham, Myrna Loy, Bert Convy, Melvyn Douglas First remake of the 1934 film; followed by Meet Joe Black in 1998.
63	3.13	The Death of Me Yet	Drama	October 27, 1971	Wednesday
A KGB sleeper agent who adopted a new identity finds himself and his wife in jeopardy when his former superior discovers that he is still alive. Starring: Doug McClure, Richard Basehart*, Darren McGavin**, Rosemary Forsyth, Meg Foster, Dana Elcar
64	3.14	A Little Game	Thriller	October 30, 1971	Saturday
An angry and hostile boy, returning home from military school for the holidays, clashes with his stepfather and sparks suspicions that he killed a schoolmate. Starring: Ed Nelson, Diane Baker, Katy Jurado, Howard Duff, Mark Gruner, Christopher Shea
65	3.15	Two on a Bench	Comedy	November 2, 1971	Tuesday
Two young people – one buttoned-down and the other free-spirited – are detained together for a day as suspects after they unwittingly encounter a traitorous scientist passing secrets on a park bench. Starring: Patty Duke, Ted Bessell, Andrew Duggan, John Astin, Alice Ghostley Terry Carter, Dick Balduzzi
66	3.16	Revenge!	Thriller	November 6, 1971	Saturday
A deranged and vengeful mother imprisons in her basement the man that she believes is responsible for seducing her daughter. Starring: Shelley Winters, Bradford Dillman, Stuart Whitman, Roger Perry, Gary Clarke
67	3.17	Do Not Fold, Spindle or Mutilate	Thriller	November 9, 1971	Tuesday
Four elderly women create a fake profile at a computer dating service as a prank, but "she" attracts a murderous stalker. Starring: Helen Hayes, Myrna Loy, Mildred Natwick, Sylvia Sidney, Vince Edwards, John Beradino
68	3.18	Duel	Thriller	November 13, 1971	Saturday
A driver finds himself inexplicably targeted and harassed by a truck and its mysterious, unseen driver. Starring: Dennis Weaver Steven Spielberg's feature-length film directorial debut.
69	3.19	Mr. and Mrs. Bo Jo Jones	Drama	November 16, 1971	Tuesday
Facing an unexpected pregnancy, a teenage couple gets married over the objections of their families, one well-off and one middle class. Starring: Desi Arnaz Jr., Christopher Norris, Dan Dailey*, Dina Merrill*, Tom Bosley*, Lynn Carlin*, Susan Strasberg*, Jessie Royce Landis**, Larry Wilcox, Nicholas Hammond Based on the novel by Ann Head.
70	3.20	The Reluctant Heroes	War drama	November 23, 1971	Tuesday
An Army historian uses his knowledge of historical tactics and languages to lead a unit under attack at a mountain observation post during the Korean War. Starring: Ken Berry, Jim Hutton, Trini Lopez, Don Marshall, Ralph Meeker, Cameron Mitchell, Warren Oates, Soon-Tek Oh
71	3.21	The Failing of Raymond	Suspense	November 27, 1971	Saturday
An escaped mental patient stalks the English literature teacher who he blames for failing him in high school. Starring: Jane Wyman, Dean Stockwell, Dana Andrews**, Paul Henreid, Tim O'Connor, Priscilla Pointer
72	3.22	Brian's Song	Drama	November 30, 1971	Tuesday
Dramatization of professional football player Brian Piccolo's friendship with teammate Gale Sayers and Piccolo's battle with cancer. Starring: James Caan, Billy Dee Williams, Jack Warden, Shelley Fabares Eight Emmy nominations, four wins.
73	3.23	The Devil and Miss Sarah	Western	December 4, 1971	Saturday
A settler couple – the wife having second sight – is tormented by an outlaw prisoner they're escorting, who is also imbued with the gift and a silver tongue. Starring: Gene Barry, Janice Rule, James Drury, Slim Pickens, Donald Moffat
74	3.24	If Tomorrow Comes	Drama	December 7, 1971	Tuesday
An American girl marries a Japanese American just before the attack on Pearl Harbor. Starring: Patty Duke, Frank Michael Liu, Anne Baxter, James Whitmore, Mako, Pat Hingle Originally promoted as The Glass Hammer.
75	3.25	See the Man Run	Heist	December 11, 1971	Saturday
After a kidnapper dials the wrong number and calls his phone, a B movie actor secretly impersonates the victim's father in order to steal a cut of the ransom. Starring: Robert Culp, Angie Dickinson, Eddie Albert, June Allyson Music by David Shire.
76	3.26	The Trackers	Western	December 14, 1971	Tuesday
An African American U.S. Marshal helps a homesteader track his daughter's abductors, but faces racism at every turn. Starring: Sammy Davis Jr., Ernest Borgnine**, Jim Davis Sammy Davis Jr. was an executive producer on this film.
77	3.27	What's a Nice Girl Like You...?	Comedy	December 18, 1971	Saturday
Kidnappers force a Bronx woman to impersonate a socialite in order to bilk a senile old man out of a fortune. Starring: Brenda Vaccaro, Jack Warden, Roddy McDowall, Jo Anne Worley, Vincent Price, Edmond O'Brien Written by Howard Fast and directed by Jerry Paris.
78	3.28	Gidget Gets Married	Comedy	January 4, 1972	Tuesday
Moondoggie gets a job at a defense contractor, but Gidget, bored as a new wife, starts a rebellion against the rigid social structure in the planned community owned by his employer. Starring: Monie Ellis, Michael Burns, Don Ameche**, Joan Bennett**, Corinne Camacho**, MacDonald Carey**, Elinor Donahue**, Paul Lynde**, Roger Perry** Unsold pilot; the sequel to Gidget Grows Up (1.15); produced and directed by E. W. Swackhamer.
79	3.29	The Astronaut	Drama	January 8, 1972	Saturday
When the first astronaut on Mars mysteriously dies, the space agency tries to save the program by hiring an impersonator to fool the President, the public – and his wife. Starring: Jackie Cooper, Monte Markham, Susan Clark**, Richard Anderson, Robert Lansing, James Sikking Produced by Harve Bennett, who would later hire Richard Anderson to co-star on The Six Million Dollar Man and Monte Markham to guest star on the same TV series as the Seven Million Dollar Man.
80	3.30	The Night Stalker	Horror	January 11, 1972	Tuesday
Newspaper reporter Carl Kolchak tries to convince the authorities in Las Vegas that a series of murders was committed by a vampire. Starring: Darren McGavin, Simon Oakland, Carol Lynley, Claude Akins Not officially a pilot; but followed by The Night Strangler (4.29) and Kolchak: The Night Stalker.
81	3.31	Madame Sin	Spy thriller	January 15, 1972	Saturday
A wealthy villainess with a brainwashing device plans to steal a Polaris submarine, with help from a disgruntled American agent she recruited. Starring: Bette Davis, Robert Wagner, Denholm Elliott, Gordon Jackson, Dudley Sutton, Catherine Schell Filmed on location on the Isle of Mull. Studio filming at Pinewood Studios. Robert Wagner was executive producer.
82	3.32	Getting Away from It All	Comedy	January 18, 1972	Tuesday
Two New York City couples pursue imagined bliss by buying and moving to a small, rustic island near Maine. Starring: Larry Hagman, Barbara Feldon, Gary Collins, E. J. Peaker, Vivian Vance*, Jim Backus*, Burgess Meredith*
83	3.33	The People	Science fiction	January 22, 1972	Saturday
A teacher hired by an insular, Amish-like farming community finds the residents have unusual powers of the mind. Starring: Kim Darby, William Shatner, Diane Varsi, Dan O'Herlihy
84	3.34	Women in Chains	Drama	January 25, 1972	Tuesday
Parole officer goes undercover in women's prison to expose a brutal prison guard. Starring: Lois Nettleton, Jessica Walter, Ida Lupino, Belinda Montgomery, BarBara Luna, Judy Strangis
85	3.35	The Screaming Woman	Thriller	January 29, 1972	Saturday
A former mental patient is haunted by the cries of a woman that she believes is buried alive on her property. Starring: Olivia de Havilland, Ed Nelson, Joseph Cotten, Walter Pidgeon Based on a short story by Ray Bradbury.
86	3.36	Hardcase	Western	February 1, 1972	Tuesday
A soldier presumed dead who returns from the Moro Rebellion kidnaps the Mexican Revolutionary leader who married his wife, seeking ransom and revenge. Starring: Clint Walker, Stefanie Powers, Pedro Armendáriz Jr., Alex Karras First live action feature film production by Hanna-Barbera.
87	3.37	When Michael Calls	Thriller	February 5, 1972	Saturday
A woman begins receiving phone calls from her supposedly dead nephew Michael and begins to wonder if Michael is really dead, or if she is losing touch with reality. Starring: Ben Gazzara, Elizabeth Ashley, Michael Douglas, Marian Waldman, Al Waxman
88	3.88	Second Chance	Drama	February 8, 1972	Tuesday
A world-weary stockbroker buys a ghost town and invites people who want a second chance in life to populate it. Starring: Brian Keith, Elizabeth Ashley, Kenneth Mars, William Windom, Avery Schreiber, Rosey Grier, Juliet Prowse** Unsold pilot.
89	3.39	The Hound of the Baskervilles	Mystery	February 9, 1972	Wednesday
Sherlock Holmes investigates a supposed curse stalking the heir to Baskerville Hall. Starring: Stewart Granger, Bernard Fox, William Shatner and Jane Merrow. First pilot for the unsold anthology series Great Detectives.
90	3.40	Call Her Mom	Comedy	February 15, 1972	Tuesday
Facing expulsion for lacking a house mother, the rowdy APE fraternity hires a feisty young waitress for the job. Starring: Connie Stevens, Charles Nelson Reilly*, Jim Hutton*, Van Johnson* Unsold pilot.
91	3.41	Kung Fu	Western	February 22, 1972	Tuesday
A fugitive Shaolin priest in the Old West tries to help oppressed coolies forced to lay railroad tracks under inhumane conditions. Starring: David Carradine, Keye Luke, Philip Ahn, Barry Sullivan*, Albert Salmi*, Wayne Maunder*, Benson Fong, James Hong, Robert Ito, Radames Pera Pilot for the 1972-75 TV series of the same name premiering in the fall season.
92	3.42	Two for the Money	Mystery	February 26, 1972	Saturday
Two ex-cops starting out as private eyes take their first case – to find a wily young man who murdered a family twelve years earlier then vanished without a trace. Starring: Robert Hooks, Stephen Brooks, Walter Brennan*, Catherine Burns*, Neville Brand*, Shelley Fabares*, Anne Revere*, Mercedes McCambridge**, Richard Dreyfuss Unsold pilot.
93	3.43	The Eyes of Charles Sand	Occult thriller	February 29, 1972	Tuesday
After his uncle's death, a businessman learns the family trait of clairvoyance has been passed to him, while an heiress who believes her brother is dead seeks his help. Starring: Peter Haskell, Barbara Rush*, Sharon Farrell*, Bradford Dillman*, Adam West*, Joan Bennett* Unsold pilot.
94	3.44	A Very Missing Person	Mystery	March 4, 1972	Saturday
Amateur sleuth Hildegarde Withers helps the police search for a missing girl, then becomes involved in an investigation of the murder of the girl's cult leader. Starring: Eve Arden, James Gregory, Julie Newmar*, Ray Danton, Pat Morita, Skye Aubrey Unsold pilot. Based on the novel Hildegarde Withers Makes the Scene, published a year earlier. Filmed on location in New York City.
95	3.45	The Rookies	Crime drama	March 7, 1972	Tuesday
Pilot for the 1972-76 TV series of the same name premiering in the fall season. Starring: Michael Ontkean, Darren McGavin, Georg Stanford Brown, Cameron Mitchell, Paul Burke, Sam Melville

=== Season 4: 1972–73 ===
No.	Mov	Title	Genre	Air date	Weekday
95	4.01	The Longest Night	Crime drama	September 12, 1972	Tuesday
A wealthy father and the FBI urgently try to save his kidnapped daughter, buried in a box with only a seven day supply of air. Starring: David Janssen, James Farentino, Phyllis Thaxter, Skye Aubrey, Mike Farrell, Sallie Shockley, Joel Fabiani, Richard Anderson, Jason Bernard (uncredited) Based on the true story of the kidnapping of Barbara Mackle in 1968.
96	4.02	The Daughters of Joshua Cabe	Western	September 13, 1972	Wednesday
A farmer convinces a prostitute, a con artist and a pickpocket to pose as his daughters in order to fend off a rival who is trying to steal his land using the homesteading law. Starring: Buddy Ebsen, Karen Valentine, Lesley Ann Warren, Sandra Dee**, Jack Elam, Leif Erickson**, Don Stroud, Henry Jones First pilot for an unsold series, followed by The Daughters of Joshua Cabe Return (6.29).
97	4.03	No Place to Run	Drama	September 19, 1972	Tuesday
An adopted boy's parents are killed, and to keep him from returning to the state's custody, he and his grandfather run away. Starring: Herschel Bernardi, Scott Jacoby, Stefanie Powers, Larry Hagman, Neville Brand, Tom Bosley, Kay Medford
98	4.04	Haunts of the Very Rich	Folk horror	September 20, 1972	Wednesday
Visitors at a mysterious luxury resort begin to suspect that they're actually in Hell when conditions inexorably deteriorate. Starring: Lloyd Bridges, Cloris Leachman, Edward Asner, Anne Francis, Tony Bill, Donna Mills, Robert Reed, Moses Gunn
99	4.05	Moon of the Wolf	Mystery/horror	September 26, 1972	Tuesday
In Louisiana bayou country, a sheriff faces murders committed with supernatural strength, possibly by a werewolf. Starring: David Janssen, Barbara Rush, Bradford Dillman, John Beradino, Geoffrey Lewis
100	4.06	Say Goodbye, Maggie Cole	Medical drama	September 27, 1972	Wednesday
A recently widowed research doctor joins a Chicago clinic to try to escape her grief, where she befriends a young girl dying of leukemia. Starring: Susan Hayward, Darren McGavin, Michael Constantine, Michele Nichols, Dane Clark**, Beverly Garland**, Jeanette Nolan**, Richard Anderson Theme song sung by Dusty Springfield.
101	4.07	Playmates	Comedy	October 3, 1972	Tuesday
Two divorced men meet and become friends but unwittingly begin dating each other's ex-wives. Starring: Alan Alda, Connie Stevens, Barbara Feldon, Doug McClure
102	4.08	Rolling Man	Drama	October 4, 1972	Wednesday
A man's tortured journey as he tries to find his young sons after spending a stint in prison. Starring: Dennis Weaver, Don Stroud, Donna Mills, Jimmy Dean, Slim Pickens, Agnes Moorehead, Sheree North Directorial debut of Peter Hyams. Coincidentally, Donna Mills and Agnes Moorehead would also appear six days later in the next Movie of the Week.
103	4.09	Night of Terror	Thriller	October 10, 1972	Tuesday
A woman is paralyzed and pursued by enforcers for a crime syndicate who are looking for an unknown item left in her possession. Starring: Donna Mills, Martin Balsam, Chuck Connors, Agnes Moorehead, Catherine Burns Directed by Jeannot Szwarc. Produced by Thomas Miller and Edward Milkis, who would go on to produce successful sitcoms for ABC.
104	4.10	Lieutenant Schuster's Wife	Crime drama	October 11, 1972	Wednesday
When an NYPD lieutenant is murdered and accused of corruption, his widow is determined to find out who set him up and to clear his name. Starring: Lee Grant, Jack Warden, Don Galloway, Nehemiah Persoff, Eartha Kitt, Paul Burke** Produced and co-written by Steven Bochco.
105	4.11	Goodnight, My Love	Mystery	October 17, 1972	Tuesday
A mysterious blonde hires a dwarf and his private-eye partner to find her missing boyfriend in 1946 Los Angeles. Starring: Richard Boone, Barbara Bain, Michael Dunn, Victor Buono, Gianni Russo Written and directed by Peter Hyams.
106	4.12	A Great American Tragedy	Drama	October 18, 1972	Wednesday
The travails and frustrations of a desperate, middle-aged aerospace professional downsized in a tight job market. Starring: George Kennedy, Vera Miles, William Windom, James Woods, Kevin McCarthy*, Robert Mandan
107	4.13	Short Walk to Daylight	Disaster	October 24, 1972	Tuesday
After an earthquake in New York City collapses a subway tunnel, survivors from a subway train try to find a way out. Starring: James Brolin, Don Mitchell, James McEachin, Abbey Lincoln, Brooke Bundy, Laurette Spang
108	4.14	Family Flight	Drama/disaster	October 25, 1972	Wednesday
A family in a small plane downed in Baja California during a storm struggles to fix the plane, clear a runway and fly back to civilization. Starring: Rod Taylor, Dina Merrill, Kristoffer Tabori, Janet Margolin Produced by Harve Bennett, who would incorporate parts of the plot and footage into "Pilot Error", a 1974 episode of The Six Million Dollar Man, a TV series for which he was executive producer.
109	4.15	The Bounty Man	Western	October 31, 1972	Tuesday
A bounty hunter bringing in a notorious outlaw has to fend off a rival hunter's gang, who also want the bounty. Starring: Clint Walker, Richard Basehart, John Ericson, Margot Kidder*, Gene Evans
110	4.16	That Certain Summer	Drama	November 1, 1972	Wednesday
Seminal film dealing with homosexuality; seven Emmy nominations, one win. Starring: Hal Holbrook, Martin Sheen, Joe Don Baker, Scott Jacoby, Hope Lange
111	4.17	The Crooked Hearts	Comedy/mystery	November 8, 1972	Wednesday
Two elderly swindlers unwittingly target each other through a dating service, and one may be a lonely hearts killer. Starring: Douglas Fairbanks Jr., Rosalind Russell, Ross Martin, Michael Murphy, Maureen O'Sullivan
112	4.18	The Victim	Thriller	November 14, 1972	Tuesday
A wealthy woman is trapped during a storm in a house with no electricity or phone. A killer has murdered her sister, stuffed the body in the basement, and is now after her. Starring: Elizabeth Montgomery, Eileen Heckart, George Maharis, Jess Walton
113	4.19	All My Darling Daughters	Comedy/drama	November 22, 1972	Wednesday
A judge has to deal with his four daughters, his four future sons-in-law and four weddings all on the same day. Starring: Robert Young, Raymond Massey, Eve Arden, Sharon Gless, Judy Strangis, Darleen Carr, Darrell Larson Unsold pilot; followed by My Darling Daughters' Anniversary (5.23).
114	4.20	Home for the Holidays	Thriller	November 28, 1972	Tuesday
An aging father is convinced that his second wife is trying to poison him and he summons his four daughters home for protection. Starring: Sally Field, Eleanor Parker, Julie Harris, Jessica Walter, Jill Haworth, Walter Brennan
115	4.21	The Heist	Crime drama	November 29, 1972	Wednesday
An armored car guard who is forced to help rob his own company must convince the police that he is innocent. Starring: Christopher George, Elizabeth Ashley, Howard Duff, Norman Fell, Cliff Osmond, Robert Mandan, Michael Bell
116	4.22	The Couple Takes a Wife	Romantic comedy	December 5, 1972	Tuesday
Marital woes ensue when a busy working couple hires a sexy, young, multi-talented woman as a "wife" to manage their household and children. Starring: Bill Bixby, Paula Prentiss, Myrna Loy, Valerie Perrine**, Robert Goulet**, Nanette Fabray**, Larry Storch** Directed by Jerry Paris.
117	4.23	Pursuit	Thriller	December 12, 1972	Tuesday
A cunning political extremist plays cat and mouse with a federal agent after stealing a powerful nerve gas to kill the President at a political convention. Starring: Ben Gazzara, E.G. Marshall, William Windom, Joseph Wiseman, Jim McMullan, Martin Sheen Michael Crichton's debut as a film director; based on Crichton's novel Binary. Originally promoted by ABC under the title, Explosion!
118	4.24	Every Man Needs One	Romantic comedy	December 13, 1972	Wednesday
A chauvinistic architect facing legal action for sexual discrimination agrees to hire a female architect for 30 days. Starring: Connie Stevens, Ken Berry**, Gail Fisher*, Steve Franken*, Henry Gibson*, Jerry Paris*, Louise Sorel*, Nancy Walker* (voice only), Carol Wayne*, Stanley Adams Produced and directed by Jerry Paris
119	4.25	The Weekend Nun	Drama	December 20, 1972	Wednesday
A cloistered nun has her eyes opened when she enters the outside world to work as a juvenile probation officer during the week. Starring: Joanna Pettet**, Vic Morrow*, Ann Sothern*, James Gregory*, Beverly Garland*, Kay Lenz Unsold pilot. Directed by Jeannot Szwarc. Produced by Thomas Miller and Edward Milkis, who would go on to produce successful sitcoms for ABC. Inspired by the motivational teachings of former nun Joyce Duco. Kay Lenz's professional debut.
120	4.26	Firehouse	Drama	January 2, 1973	Tuesday
A newly-hired Black firefighter faces a serial arsonist and racism from a colleague. Starring: Richard Roundtree, Andrew Duggan, Richard Jaeckel, Val Avery, Sheila Frazier, Vince Edwards** Pilot for the 1974 TV series of the same name. Filmed and set in New York City while the series was relocated to Los Angeles.
121	4.27	The Devil's Daughter	Horror	January 9, 1973	Tuesday
A young woman is told by a satanic cult that she is the daughter of Satan and was conceived to be betrothed to a demon. Starring: Shelley Winters, Belinda Montgomery*, Robert Foxworth*, Jonathan Frid*, Martha Scott*, Joseph Cotten**, Ian Wolfe Directed by Jeannot Szwarc. Produced by Thomas Miller and Edward Milkis, who would go on to produce successful sitcoms for ABC.
122	4.28	Trouble Comes to Town	Drama	January 10, 1973	Wednesday
A Southern sheriff brings into his home a black juvenile delinquent, who is the son of the man who saved his life during the Korean War. Starring: Lloyd Bridges, Pat Hingle, Hari Rhodes, Austin Stoker, Morris Buchanan, James Wheaton, Sheree North, Joseph Bottoms
123	4.29	The Night Strangler	Horror	January 16, 1973	Tuesday
Carl Kolchak investigates killings in Seattle that seem to be tied to an immortal who needs blood for an elixir to rejuvenate himself every 21 years. Starring: Darren McGavin, Simon Oakland, Jo Ann Pflug, Richard Anderson, Scott Brady, Wally Cox, Margaret Hamilton, John Carradine Not officially a pilot; the sequel to The Night Stalker (3.29), followed by the 1974-75 TV series Kolchak: The Night Stalker.
124	4.30	Female Artillery	Western	January 17, 1973	Wednesday
A thief fleeing his former gang helps a wagon train of women and children fight them off. Starring: Dennis Weaver, Ida Lupino, Sally Ann Howes, Linda Evans, Albert Salmi, Nina Foch
125	4.31	Go Ask Alice	Drama	January 24, 1973	Wednesday
Alice is a 15-year-old girl who develops a drug addiction and runs away from home on a journey of self-destructive escapism. Attributed to "Anonymous", the original 1971 book was written in diary form, and was originally presented as being an edited version of the authentic diary of the unnamed teenage protagonist. The movie is faithful to the book and uses the 'diary-entries' as the voice-over narrative. Starring: Jamie Smith-Jackson, William Shatner, Ruth Roman, Jennifer Edwards, Mackenzie Phillips, Andy Griffith Once believed to be a genuine found manuscript, the original book is now regarded as the product of author Beatrice Sparks.
126	4.32	A Cold Night's Death	Thriller	January 30, 1973	Tuesday
Two scientists doing research on monkeys at a remote, snowbound research laboratory where a lone colleague had mysteriously died face strange happenings of their own. Starring: Robert Culp, Eli Wallach**, Michael Gwynne Made with the cooperation of White Mountain Research Center.
127	4.33	Snatched	Crime drama	January 31, 1973	Wednesday
Three business executives' wives are held for ransom, including an insulin-dependent diabetic and a conspirator. Starring: Leslie Nielsen, Howard Duff, John Saxon, Sheree North, Barbara Parkins, Tisha Sterling, Robert Reed, Anthony Zerbe
128	4.34	Divorce His	Drama	February 6, 1973	Tuesday
Rashomon-style story with dueling accounts of events leading to a divorce. The first half is from the husband's perspective. Star vehicle for Elizabeth Taylor and Richard Burton. Also starring: Carrie Nye, Barry Foster, Gabriele Ferzetti, Ronald Radd, Thomas Baptiste, Rudolph Walker, Eva Griffith
129	4.35	Divorce Hers	Drama	February 7, 1973	Wednesday
Continuing from Divorce His the night before. The second half is from the wife's perspective.
130	4.36	The Great American Beauty Contest	Drama	February 13, 1973	Tuesday
Behind the scenes melodrama unfolds for both contestants and officials at the "Miss American Beauty" pageant. Starring: Eleanor Parker, Bob Cummings, Jo Anna Cameron, Farrah Fawcett, Christopher Norris, Larry Wilcox
131	4.37	The Girls of Huntington House	Drama	February 14, 1973	Wednesday
A teacher at a school for unwed mothers takes a personal interest in her students. Starring: Shirley Jones, Mercedes McCambridge, Pamela Sue Martin, William Windom, Sissy Spacek Based on the novel by Blossom Elfman.
132	4.38	A Brand New Life	Drama	February 20, 1973	Tuesday
After 18 years of marriage, a middle-aged couple are surprised to find that they are expecting their first child. Starring: Cloris Leachman, Martin Balsam, Marge Redmond, Gene Nelson, Mildred Dunnock
133	4.39	And No One Could Save Her	Mystery	February 21, 1973	Wednesday
A woman searches for her husband, who boarded a plane for Ireland and disappeared. Starring: Lee Remick, Frank Grimes, Milo O'Shea, Liam Redmond, Shelagh Fraser, Robert Lang
134	4.40	The Connection	Crime drama	February 27, 1973	Tuesday
Unsold pilot about an out-of-work newspaper reporter who becomes involved with jewel thieves. Starring: Charles Durning, Ronny Cox, Dennis Cole, Zohra Lampert, Heather MacRae, Dana Wynter
135	4.41	You'll Never See Me Again	Thriller	February 28, 1973	Wednesday
A woman storms out after a quarrel and her husband desperately searches for her while the police suspect him of killing her. Starring: David Hartman, Jane Wyatt, Ralph Meeker, Jess Walton, Joseph Campanella** Based on a short story by Cornell Woolrich.
136	4.42	The Letters	Drama	March 6, 1973	Tuesday
Stories of lives changed when mail is lost for a year. A cheating husband writes a breakup letter to his wife before reconciling. A wealthy woman writes her sister about her newfound happiness before she's murdered by the treacherous pianist they competed for. A wrongly accused man chased off by his girlfriend's mother dies after writing of his intent to clear his name. Starring: John Forsythe, Pamela Franklin, Ida Lupino, Dina Merrill, Ben Murphy, Leslie Nielsen, Jane Powell, Barbara Stanwyck, Lesley Ann Warren, Henry Jones First unsold pilot for an anthology series from Aaron Spelling, similar to his The Love Boat and Fantasy Island shows; followed by Letters from Three Lovers (5.09).
137	4.43	The Six Million Dollar Man	Science fiction	March 7, 1973	Wednesday
Former astronaut Steve Austin is critically injured in the crash of an experimental aircraft and is given bionic body parts as replacements. Starring: Lee Majors, Darren McGavin**, Martin Balsam**, Barbara Anderson First of three TV movies which would lead to the 1973-78 TV series The Six Million Dollar Man.
138	4.44	The Bait	Crime drama	March 13, 1973	Tuesday
A female police detective volunteers to act as a lure to trap a serial rapist-murderer. Starring: Donna Mills, Michael Constantine, William Devane, Noam Pitlik, Thalmus Rasulala, June Lockhart Unsold pilot; based on Dorothy Uhnak's first novel; her third novel, The Ledger, was adapted to become Get Christie Love! (5.44).
139	4.45	Class of '63	Drama	March 14, 1973	Wednesday
A college reunion is the setting for a messy love triangle between a successful executive, his wife and her egotistical former boyfriend. Starring: James Brolin, Joan Hackett, Cliff Gorman** Rare producing credit for renowned casting director Lynn Stalmaster.
140	4.46	Beg, Borrow or Steal	Heist	March 20, 1973	Tuesday
Three embittered disabled men - a paraplegic, a double amputee and a blind man - plot to steal priceless jewels off a gold statue in a museum. Starring: Mike Connors, Kent McCord, Michael Cole**, Joel Fabiani, Russell Johnson Suspenseful teleplay written by Paul Playdon, who wrote many similar scripts for the 1966-73 TV series Mission: Impossible
141	4.47	Toma	Crime drama	March 21, 1973	Wednesday
Pilot for the 1973-74 TV series of the same name premiering on October 4. Starring: Tony Musante, Susan Strasberg, Simon Oakland, Philip Michael Thomas, Abe Vigoda, Nicholas Colasanto

=== Season 5: 1973–74 ===
No.	Mov	Title	Genre	Air date	Weekday
142	5.01	Deliver Us from Evil	Drama	September 11, 1973	Tuesday
Six backpackers in the northern Rockies kill a parachuting skyjacker and decide to keep the $600,000 ransom, but they gradually fall prey to the brutal conditions of the wilderness. Starring: George Kennedy, Jan-Michael Vincent, Bradford Dillman, Charles Aidman, Jim Davis, Jack Weston** Mostly filmed on location at Mount Hood National Forest.
143	5.02	She Lives!	Drama	September 12, 1973	Wednesday
A college couple desperately seek out methods of treatment after the woman is diagnosed with Hodgkin lymphoma. Starring: Desi Arnaz, Jr., Season Hubley, Anthony Zerbe**, Michael Margotta, Jack Soo, Jay Robinson The movie featured the song "Time in a Bottle" by Jim Croce; his death in a plane crash eight days after the movie premiered eventually drove ABC Records to release it as a single, which subsequently reached #1 on the U.S. music charts.
144	5.03	Dying Room Only	Thriller	September 18, 1973	Tuesday
At an isolated diner, a woman returns from the restroom to find her husband missing and nobody willing to give her an explanation. Starring: Cloris Leachman, Ross Martin**, Ned Beatty, Louise Latham, Dabney Coleman
145	5.04	Satan's School for Girls	Horror	September 19, 1973	Wednesday
A young woman investigating her sister's suicide at a private girls' school finds herself battling a Satanic cult. Starring: Pamela Franklin, Kate Jackson, Lloyd Bochner, Roy Thinnes, Cheryl Ladd
146	5.05	Smile When You Say 'I Do'	Comedy	September 25, 1973	Tuesday
Documentary by Candid Camera producer/host Allen Funt; comedic compilation of Funt's signature practical jokes and hidden-camera experiments, all focused entirely on the theme of marriage.
147	5.06	Hijack!	Thriller	September 26, 1973	Wednesday
Two long-haul truckers carrying a secret load for a defense contractor must contend with a mysterious and murderous group who wants to steal their cargo. Starring: David Janssen, Keenan Wynn, Lee Purcell, William Schallert
148	5.07	Runaway!	Disaster	September 29, 1973	Saturday
A train with nonfunctional brakes coming down a mountain from a ski resort careens toward the end of the line. Starring: Ben Johnson, Ben Murphy, Darleen Carr, Ed Nelson, Martin Milner**, Vera Miles***
149	5.08	Isn't It Shocking?	Comedy/mystery	October 2, 1973	Tuesday
A small-town sheriff is confronted with an ingenious killer when elderly citizens begin to die mysteriously. Starring: Alan Alda, Louise Lasser, Edmond O'Brien, Ruth Gordon, Will Geer
150	5.09	Letters from Three Lovers	Drama	October 3, 1973	Wednesday
Tales of lives changed when letters are delayed for a year. A young woman writes to her jailed boyfriend about her continued devotion, who had pushed her away after he was sent to prison. A busy executive's wife begins a monthly affair at a hotel, and her companion is supposed to mail a letter if he cannot attend. Two office workers in the same building mistake each other for wealthy people in Palm Beach, with the man writing a confessional letter declaring his unworthiness and begging her forgiveness. Starring: June Allyson, Ken Berry, Juliet Mills, Belinda J. Montgomery, Martin Sheen, Robert Sterling, Barry Sullivan, Lyle Waggoner, Henry Jones Second unsold pilot for an anthology series from Aaron Spelling, similar to his The Love Boat and Fantasy Island shows; follows The Letters (4.42).
151	5.10	The Alpha Caper	Heist	October 6, 1973	Saturday
A parole officer facing mandatory retirement recruits three of his parolees to steal gold bullion from an armored truck. Starring: Henry Fonda, Leonard Nimoy, James McEachin, Larry Hagman**, Elena Verdugo, John Marley, Vic Tayback, James Sikking Unsold pilot; a rare TV appearance by Henry Fonda.
152	5.11	Shirts/Skins	Comedy	October 9, 1973	Tuesday
Sports comedy following six high-strung, stressed-out businessmen who turn their contentious weekly YMCA basketball games into a chaotic city-wide, ego-driven game of extreme hide-and-seek. Starring: Bill Bixby, Rene Auberjonois, Leonard Frey, Doug McClure, McLean Stevenson, Ron Glass, Loretta Swit, Robert Walden
153	5.12	Don't Be Afraid of the Dark	Horror	October 10, 1973	Wednesday
A young housewife accidentally sets free three goblin-like creatures from within a sealed fireplace in the Victorian mansion she has inherited from her late grandmother. The creatures begin terrorizing her, then reveal that whoever frees them must become one of them. Starring: Kim Darby, Jim Hutton, William Demarest, Pedro Armendáriz, Barbara Anderson
154	5.13	Double Indemnity	Crime Drama	October 13, 1973	Saturday
A scheming wife lures an insurance investigator into helping her to murder her husband and then declare it an accident. The investigator's boss, not knowing his man is involved in it, suspects murder and sets out to prove it. Starring: Richard Crenna, Lee J. Cobb, Robert Webber, Samantha Eggar, Kathleen Cody Adaptation of the 1944 film noir of the same name.
155	5.14	The Third Girl from the Left	Drama	October 16, 1973	Tuesday
An aging chorus girl finally comes to the realization that her long-running affair with a nightclub comic has no future. She soon begins to notice that a good-looking (and much younger) delivery boy is paying a lot of attention to her. Starring: Kim Novak, Tony Curtis, Barbi Benton, George Furth, Michael Brandon, Anne Ramsey
156	5.15	The Man Who Could Talk to Kids	Drama	October 17, 1973	Wednesday
When an emotionally-disturbed young boy shuts out all of his family and friends, a counselor tries to help bring him and his family together again. Starring: Peter Boyle, Scott Jacoby, Tyne Daly, Collin Wilcox Paxton, Denise Nickerson, Dudley Knight, Robert Reed
157	5.16	Wine, Women and War	Action/science fiction	October 20, 1973	Saturday
Reluctant secret agent Steve Austin pursues a black market arms dealer who is offering stolen nuclear missiles to hostile nations. Starring: Lee Majors, Richard Anderson, Alan Oppenheimer, Britt Ekland*, Eric Braeden*, Earl Holliman*, David McCallum**, Michele Carey Sequel to The Six Million Dollar Man, followed by The Solid Gold Kidnapping (5.26).
158	5.17	The President's Plane Is Missing	Political drama	October 23, 1973	Tuesday
A news agency reporter suspects a conspiracy when Air Force One crashes during an international crisis, but the President's body is not found. Starring: Peter Graves, Buddy Ebsen, Arthur Kennedy, Rip Torn, Louise Sorel, Joseph Campanella Based on the novel by Robert J. Serling.
159	5.18	Money to Burn	Heist	October 27, 1973	Saturday
A small group consisting of inmate, ex-cons and family schemes to swap newly counterfeited money for genuine bills marked for incineration. Starring: E.G. Marshall, Mildred Natwick, Alejandro Rey*, David Doyle*, Charles McGraw*, Cleavon Little** Also released as Mint Condition.
160	5.19	Ordeal	Drama	October 30, 1973	Tuesday
When a grating millionaire is injured in the desert, his long-suffering wife and their guide plot to let him die, but he discovers a fierce will to live. Starring: Arthur Hill, Diana Muldaur, James Stacy, Macdonald Carey**, Michael Ansara
161	5.20	Guess Who's Sleeping in My Bed?	Comedy	October 31, 1973	Wednesday
A woman's life is upended when her childish ex-husband moves back in, with his second wife and baby in tow. Starring: Barbara Eden, Dean Jones, Kenneth Mars, Susanne Benton, Reta Shaw, Todd Lookinland, Diana Herbert
162	5.21	Linda	Mystery	November 3, 1973	Saturday
An engineer struggles to prove his innocence in a small town after his wife and her lover frame him for murder. Starring: Stella Stevens, Ed Nelson, John McIntire, John Saxon** Based on a novel by John D. MacDonald
163	5.22	The Girl Most Likely To...	Black comedy	November 6, 1973	Tuesday
A brilliant but homely college girl who becomes beautiful after a car crash and reconstructive surgery creatively murders people who had wronged her. Starring: Stockard Channing, Ed Asner**, Jim Backus**, Joe Flynn**, Chuck McCann**, Fred Grandy, Ruth McDevitt, Warren Berlinger, Larry Wilcox Story by Joan Rivers, who also co-wrote the teleplay.
164	5.23	My Darling Daughters' Anniversary	Comedy	November 7, 1973	Wednesday
In this sequel, the daughters' anniversary present is the news that their widowed father is about to get remarried. Starring: Robert Young, Raymond Massey, Ruth Hussey, Sharon Gless, Darleen Carr, Judy Strangis Unsold pilot; the sequel to All My Darling Daughters (4.19).
165	5.24	Death Race	War/Action	November 10, 1973	Saturday
Two American pilots in a P-40 with a damaged wing are pursued across the desert by an obsessed Nazi general in a commandeered Panzer tank. Starring: Doug McClure**, Roy Thinnes, Lloyd Bridges, Eric Braeden, Ivor Barry Also known as State of Division.
166	5.25	Trapped	Suspense	November 14, 1973	Wednesday
A man trapped overnight in a department store must fight to survive vicious guard dogs patrolling the store. Starring: James Brolin, Susan Clark, Earl Holliman, Robert Hooks**
167	5.26	The Solid Gold Kidnapping	Action/science fiction	November 17, 1973	Saturday
Bionic man Steve Austin is assigned to find an important treaty negotiator who has been kidnapped for $1 billion in gold bullion. Starring: Lee Majors, Richard Anderson, Alan Oppenheimer, Elizabeth Ashley*, Terry Carter*, John Vernon**, Maurice Evans**, Luciana Paluzzi**, Leif Erickson** Preceded by The Six Million Dollar Man and Wine, Women and War.
168	5.27	The Affair	Romance drama	November 20, 1973	Tuesday
Divorcee becomes involved with beautiful disabled songwriter; their relationship proves to be too much for them both. Starring: Natalie Wood, Robert Wagner, Jamie Smith-Jackson, Bruce Davison, Frances Reid
169	5.28	Scream, Pretty Peggy	Horror	November 24, 1973	Saturday
A sculptor hires a young college girl to take care of his mother and his supposedly insane sister. Starring: Bette Davis, Ted Bessell, Sian Barbara Allen, Christiane Schmidtmer
170	5.29	Cry Rape!	Drama	November 27, 1973	Tuesday
A man who is arrested for rape swears it wasn't him but somebody who looks just like him, but the victim insists it was him. Starring: Andrea Marcovicci, Peter Coffield, Greg Mullavey, Joseph Sirola, Whit Bissell
171	5.30	Outrage	Drama	November 28, 1973	Wednesday
A doctor in an idyllic suburb takes extreme action when nobody wants to stand up to uncontrollable young residents terrorizing the community. Starring: Robert Culp, Marlyn Mason, Beah Richards, Jacqueline Scott, Ramon Bieri, Mark Lenard, Nicholas Hammond Based on a true story.
172	5.31	A Summer Without Boys	Drama	December 4, 1973	Tuesday
A teenager competes with her mother for a young man at a mountain resort one summer during World War II. Starring: Kay Lenz, Barbara Bain, Michael Moriarty, Bruno Kirby, Mildred Dunnock, Debralee Scott, Michael Lembeck
173	5.32	Blood Sport	Drama	December 5, 1973	Wednesday
A high school athlete is torn between his father, who wants him to get a football scholarship, and his coach, who wants a winning season. Starring: Ben Johnson, Gary Busey, Larry Hagman, David Doyle, Jan Clayton, William Lucking
174	5.33	Maneater	Thriller	December 8, 1973	Saturday
Two couples on a camping trip are hunted by two tigers set upon them by a crazed animal trainer. Starring: Ben Gazzara. Sheree North, Richard Basehart, Laurette Spang Directed by Vince Edwards.
175	5.34	The Cat Creature	Horror	December 11, 1973	Tuesday
An Egyptology professor helps investigate feline-tinged deaths that stalk everyone who comes in contact with a cursed amulet. Starring: Meredith Baxter, David Hedison, Gale Sondergaard, John Carradine*, Keye Luke*, Stuart Whitman** Teleplay credit and story co-credit to Robert Bloch.
176	5.35	Message to My Daughter	Drama	December 12, 1973	Wednesday
A confused teenager discovers a stack of tapes recorded years earlier by her dying mother and starts listening. Starring: Kitty Winn, Martin Sheen, Bonnie Bedelia, Mark Slade, King Moody, Neva Patterson
177	5.36	What Are Best Friends For?	Comedy	December 18, 1973	Tuesday
Muted comedy about a couple trying to get their newly divorced friend to get over his cheating ex-wife. Starring: Ted Bessell, Larry Hagman, Lee Grant, Barbara Feldon**
178	5.37	Pioneer Woman	Drama/Western	December 19, 1973	Wednesday
Despite some initial hesitations, a family from the Eastern USA decides to try their luck by settling in the harsh and dangerous West in 1867. Starring: Joanna Pettet, William Shatner, David Janssen, Helen Hunt, Lance LeGault
179	5.38	Indict and Convict	Crime Drama	January 6, 1974	Sunday
A prosecutor must try his friend, a deputy district attorney, who has been charged with murdering his wife and her lover. Starring: Harry Guardino, William Shatner, Ed Flanders, Susan Howard, George Grizzard, Reni Santoni, Eli Wallach, Myrna Loy, Ruta Lee
180	5.39	The Death Squad	Crime drama	January 8, 1974	Tuesday
A disgraced cop is reinstated and recruited to infiltrate a "death squad" within the department that is killing criminals who escaped justice on technicalities. Starring: Robert Forster, Michelle Phillips, Claude Akins, Mark Goddard, Melvyn Douglas**
181	5.40	Shootout in a One-Dog Town	Western	January 9, 1974	Wednesday
After a courier is murdered by a vicious gang, a banker in a tiny town struggles to defend the $200,000 he left in the bank's vault. Starring: Richard Crenna, Stefanie Powers, Jack Elam, Arthur O'Connell, Michael Ansara, Dub Taylor, Gene Evans, Michael Anderson, Jr., Richard Egan** Second live action feature film production by Hanna-Barbera.
182	5.41	Mrs. Sundance	Western	January 15, 1974	Tuesday
A Pinkerton detective leaks a rumor that the Sundance Kid was not killed in Bolivia in order to lure Etta Place out of hiding so that she can lead him to the Wild Bunch. Starring: Elizabeth Montgomery, Robert Foxworth, L. Q. Jones
183	5.42	Scream of the Wolf	Thriller	January 16, 1974	Wednesday
A big-game hunter comes out of retirement to help track down a killer wolf, and begins to suspect that it isn't a wolf but an animal that can take human form. Starring: Peter Graves, Clint Walker, Jo Ann Pflug, Philip Carey, Lee Paul
184	5.43	Skyway to Death	Disaster	January 19, 1974	Saturday
A disgruntled former employee's sabotage strands a group of passengers in an aerial tram high above a mountain as high winds approach. Starring: Bobby Sherman, Ross Martin, Stefanie Powers, Tige Andrews, John Astin**, Joseph Campanella, Ruth McDevitt, Severn Darden Exteriors filmed at the Palm Springs Aerial Tramway.
185	5.44	Get Christie Love!	Crime drama	January 22, 1974	Tuesday
A female police detective has to convince a drug kingpin's girlfriend to turn over a ledger that details his plans and contacts. Starring: Teresa Graves, Harry Guardino, Louise Sorel, Paul Stevens Early TV blaxploitation. Pilot for the 1974-75 TV series of the same name. Based on the novel, The Ledger by Dorothy Uhnak.
186	5.45	Pray for the Wildcats	Thriller	January 23, 1974	Wednesday
A sociopathic business executive forces a team of advertising agency employees to embark on a dangerous and chaotic dirt-bike trip to the Baja California desert in order to compete for his business. Starring: Andy Griffith, Angie Dickinson, William Shatner, Marjoe Gortner, Robert Reed, Janet Margolin, Lorraine Gary, John Barbour The film has since attained cult movie status due to the edgy casting of TV-dad Andy Griffith as the sociopath.
187	5.46	Heatwave!	Drama	January 26, 1974	Saturday
Complications upon problems as a young, expectant couple try to escape a brutal heat wave by fleeing to a cabin in the countryside. Starring: Ben Murphy, Bonnie Bedelia, Lew Ayres, David Huddleston*, John Anderson*, Robert Hogan, Dana Elcar
188	5.47	The Girl Who Came Gift-Wrapped	Romantic comedy	January 29, 1974	Tuesday
A men's magazine publisher experiencing a midlife crisis falls in love with a naive Wisconsin girl sent to him as a gag "gift" for his birthday. Starring: Richard Long**, Karen Valentine, Louise Sorel, Tom Bosley, Dave Madden, Reta Shaw, Farrah Fawcett Richard Long's penultimate role, before Death Cruise (6.14).
189	5.48	Killdozer	Science fiction/horror	February 2, 1974	Saturday
An extraterrestrial force from a meteorite possesses a bulldozer and starts killing a construction crew working on a remote island. Starring: Clint Walker, Carl Betz, Neville Brand, James Wainwright**, Robert Urich
190	5.49	Can Ellen Be Saved?	Drama	February 5, 1974	Tuesday
A young girl in search of spiritual enlightenment joins a religious cult, and becomes the focus of a struggle between her family and the group. Starring: Katherine Cannon, Leslie Nielsen, Michael Parks, John Saxon, Louise Fletcher, William Katt, Kathleen Quinlan
191	5.50	Cry Panic!	Mystery	February 6, 1974	Wednesday
A driver who accidentally hits a man on a dark road finds himself ensnared in a small town's conspiracy to hide the victim's death. Starring: John Forsyth, Earl Holliman, Ralph Meeker, Norman Alden, Claudia McNeil, Anne Francis**
192	5.51	The Elevator	Disaster	February 9, 1974	Saturday
Tensions rise as a group of people, including a claustrophobic armed robber, are trapped in an overloaded elevator in a skyscraper after hours. Starring: James Farentino, Roddy McDowell, Craig Stevens, Don Stroud, Teresa Wright, Myrna Loy**, Carol Lynley**, Arlene Golonka**, Barry Livingston
193	5.52	I Love You, Goodbye	Drama	February 12, 1974	Tuesday
Suburban wife and mother leaves her family to seek her own identity after resenting the societal pressures placed on her. Starring: Hope Lange, Earl Holliman, Michael Murphy, Patricia Smith, Stephen R. Hudis, Milt Kogan, Hanna Landy
194	5.53	The Morning After	Drama	February 13, 1974	Wednesday
A successful public relations writer develops a serious drinking problem that threatens his marriage and his life. Starring: Dick Van Dyke, Lynn Carlin, Don Porter, Linda Lavin, Joshua Bryant
195	5.54	Live Again, Die Again	Thriller	February 16, 1974	Saturday
A young woman is the first person to be revived from cryogenic suspension, but someone wants to ensure that her resurrection is brief. Starring: Cliff Potts, Walter Pidgeon, Donna Mills, Mike Farrell, Geraldine Page**, Vera Miles**
196	5.55	Hitchhike!	Thriller	February 23, 1974	Saturday
A woman driving to San Francisco picks up a hitchhiker, unaware that he had just murdered his stepmother. Starring: Cloris Leachman, Michael Brandon, Henry Darrow, Cameron Mitchell, Sherry Jackson
197	5.56	Killer Bees	Horror	February 26, 1974	Tuesday
A man takes his girlfriend home to his disapproving mother, who has unusual control over a swarm of "killer bees" that reside in her vineyard. Starring: Gloria Swanson, Kate Jackson, Edward Albert, Craig Stevens**, John Getz Kate Jackson and Edward Albert would play another romantic couple in another Movie of the Week, Death Cruise (6.14) airing later in 1974.
198	5.57	Unwed Father	Drama	February 27, 1974	Wednesday
A teenage boy fathers a child with his girlfriend, who intends to place their baby with adoptive parents. He objects and fights his parents, his girlfriend, his girlfriend's parents and the court system in an attempt to get custody of his child. Starring: Joseph Bottoms, Kay Lenz, Beverly Garland, Kim Hunter, Joseph Campanella, William H. Bassett
199	5.58	Houston, We've Got a Problem	Drama	March 2, 1974	Saturday
Fictional tales about family and health problems besetting flight controllers at Mission Control as they labor to bring Apollo 13 home safely. Starring: Robert Culp, Clu Gulager, Gary Collins*, Sandra Dee**, Ed Nelson***, Steve Franken
200	5.59	The Stranger Who Looks Like Me	Drama	March 6, 1974	Wednesday
A young adopted woman tries to find her birth parents, with help from a fellow adoptee she meets at a support group. Starring: Beau Bridges, Meredith Baxter, Walter Brooke, Neva Patterson, Whitney Blake**
201	5.60	Mousey	Thriller	March 9, 1974	Saturday
A schoolteacher, frustrated by his ex-wife's refusal to let him see his surrogate son and his own reputation for meekness, becomes an increasingly unhinged and violent stalker. Starring: Kirk Douglas, Jean Seberg, John Vernon, Sam Wanamaker Also known as Cat and Mouse. Star vehicle for Kirk Douglas. Douglas's son Michael would later star in Falling Down, a movie with a similar plot about an estranged father pushed over the edge. Filmed at Pinewood Studios and on location in Montreal.
202	5.61	Wonder Woman	Action	March 12, 1974	Tuesday
Wonder Woman races to recover a secret list of American agents from a criminal mastermind. Starring: Cathy Lee Crosby, Ricardo Montalbán**, Andrew Prine* Unsold pilot; not related to the 1975-79 TV series of the same name.
203	5.62	The Hanged Man	Western	March 13, 1974	Wednesday
A gunfighter who miraculously returned to life after his execution helps a young widow keep her land from a ruthless silver baron. Starring: Steve Forrest, Dean Jagger**, Will Geer **, Sharon Acker*, Brendon Boone*, Rafael Campos*, Barbara Luna*, Cameron Mitchell*
204	5.63	Men of the Dragon	Action	March 20, 1974	Wednesday
An American kung fu master and his Chinese blood brother search for his sister, kidnapped by human traffickers in Hong Kong. Starring: Jared Martin, Katie Saylor, Robert Ito, Joseph Wiseman** An American-produced chopsocky movie filmed on location in Hong Kong.
204	5.63	A Cry in the Wilderness	Drama	March 26, 1974	Tuesday
Suspecting rabies from a skunk bite, a farmer chains himself in his barn to protect his wife and son, making them promise not to release him, but he doesn't know that a flash flood is coming. Starring: George Kennedy, Joanna Pettet, Lee Montgomery, Collin Wilcox-Horne
206	5.65	The Gun and the Pulpit	Western	April 3, 1974	Wednesday
A headstrong gunslinger assumes the identity of a murdered preacher and convinces a town to stand up against a crime boss. Starring: Marjoe Gortner, Slim Pickens, David Huddleston, Geoffrey Lewis, Pamela Sue Martin, Estelle Parsons**, Jeff Corey Paul Junger Witt was the executive producer.
207	5.66	Melvin Purvis: G-Man	Action Drama	April 9, 1974	Wednesday
Sensationalized story of FBI agent Melvin Purvis's pursuit of Machine Gun Kelly. Starring: Dale Robertson, Harris Yulin, Margaret Blye*, Matt Clark, Elliott Street, John Karlen, David Canary, Steve Kanaly, Woodrow Parfrey, Dick Sargent** Paul Junger Witt was the executive producer.
208	5.67	Murder or Mercy?	Drama	April 10, 1974	Wednesday
An attorney comes out of retirement to defend a prominent doctor, who has been accused of the mercy killing of his wife. Starring: Bradford Dillman, Melvyn Douglas, Mildred Dunnock, Robert Webber, Denver Pyle, David Birney, Bettye Ackerman
209	5.68	The Last Angry Man	Drama	April 16, 1974	Tuesday
An idealistic but irascible doctor in 1936 Brooklyn fights the frustrations of the medical profession and the world. Starring: Pat Hingle, Lynn Carlin, Paul Jabara, Tracy Bogart, Sorrell Booke, Andrew Duggan*, John Hillerman
210	5.69	Nakia	Drama	April 17, 1974	Wednesday
Pilot for series premiering in the fall; the title character is a Navajo police officer in New Mexico. Starring: Robert Forster, Arthur Kennedy, Gloria DeHaven, Taylor Lacher, Victor Jory First of two Movies of the Week this night.
211	5.70	The Chadwick Family	Drama	April 17, 1974	Wednesday
A father finds himself taking care of a "family" that in addition to his son and three daughters, also consists of two sons-in-law and his youngest daughter's Chinese boyfriend. Starring: Fred MacMurray, Kathleen Maguire, Darleen Carr, Barry Bostwick, Jane Actman, Frank Michael Liu, Lara Parker, John Larch Unsold pilot. Second of two Movies of the Week this night.
212	5.71	Planet Earth	Science fiction	April 23, 1974	Tuesday
20th-century man Dylan Hunt, awakened from suspended animation in a post-apocalyptic world, visits a female-dominated society to find a missing surgeon. Starring: John Saxon, Janet Margolin, Ted Cassidy, Diana Muldaur* Second unsold pilot for a Gene Roddenberry concept; a reboot of his 1973 pilot Genesis II on CBS. Another unsold pilot without Roddenberry's involvement followed in 1975, Strange New World, also on ABC but not a Movie of the Week. That final reboot reused the PAX name, a plot point of prolonged suspended animation and had John Saxon return as lead actor, but had a completely different premise and backstory.
213	5.72	The Story of Pretty Boy Floyd	Drama	May 7, 1974	Tuesday
Historic account of the famous bank-robber Charles Arthur Floyd, "the Robin Hood of the Cookson Hills"--here portrayed as a decent man who has a strong sense of family and duty. Starring: Martin Sheen, Kim Darby, Michael Parks, Abe Vigoda, Ellen Corby, Joe Estevez, Ford Rainey, Steven Keats

=== Season 6: 1974–75 ===
No.	Mov	Title	Genre	Air date	Weekday
214	6.01	Hurricane	Disaster	September 10, 1974	Tuesday
Two hurricane hunters track a huge, violent hurricane that is bearing down on a Gulf Coast town. Starring: Larry Hagman, Martin Milner, Jessica Walter, Barry Sullivan, Michael Learned, Frank Sutton, Will Geer, Lonny Chapman, Barry Livingston, Jim Antonio, Patrick Duffy
215	6.02	Savages	Suspense	September 11, 1974	Wednesday
A sadistic hunter recklessly kills a prospector, then torments his young hunting guide and tries to frame him for the crime. Starring: Andy Griffith, Sam Bottoms, Noah Beery, James Best, Randy Boone, Jim Antonio, Jim Chandler Based on the novel Death Watch by Robb White.
216	6.03	The Sex Symbol	Drama	September 17, 1974	Tuesday
Fictional biography of a Marilyn Monroe-like movie star. Starring: Connie Stevens, Shelley Winters, Milton Selzer, Madlyn Rhue, Nehemiah Persoff
217	6.04	The Day the Earth Moved	Disaster	September 18, 1974	Wednesday
Aerial photographers race to save the residents of a tiny town when their photos indicate an earthquake is imminent. Starring: Jackie Cooper, Cleavon Little, Stella Stevens**, William Windom Bobby Sherman was one of the producers.
218	6.05	The Great Niagara	Drama	September 24, 1974	Tuesday
In Depression era Canada, a man who once survived the plunge over Niagara Falls wants his sons to follow in his footsteps. Starring: Richard Boone, Michael Sacks, Randy Quaid, Jennifer Salt, Burt Young Filmed on location in Niagara Falls, Ontario.
219	6.06	The California Kid	Drama	September 25, 1974	Wednesday
When a sailor's car is pushed over a cliff by a sadistic sheriff at a speed trap, his hot rodder brother comes to town to investigate and to get revenge. Starring: Martin Sheen, Vic Morrow, Michelle Phillips, Nick Nolte, Stuart Margolin Produced by Howie Horwitz.
220	6.07	The Stranger Within	Science fiction	October 1, 1974	Tuesday
An expectant mother begins to suspect that her actions and emotions are being controlled by her unborn baby. Starring: Barbara Eden, George Grizzard, Joyce Van Patten, David Doyle, Nehemiah Persoff
221	6.08	Death Sentence	Thriller	October 2, 1974	Wednesday
A juror in a murder case begins to believe that the man on trial is innocent of the crime, and then discovers that the real killer is actually her own husband. Starring: Cloris Leachman, Laurence Luckinbill, Nick Nolte, Alan Oppenheimer, William Schallert Based on the 1968 novel After the Trial by Eric Roman.
222	6.09	Hit Lady	Suspense	October 8, 1974	Tuesday
A seductive assassin wants to leave her lethal profession behind and goes on the run with her lover. Starring: Yvette Mimieux, Joseph Campanella, Clu Gulager, Dack Rambo, Keenan Wynn Written by Yvette Mimieux.
223	6.10	Locusts	Drama	October 9, 1974	Wednesday
During World War II, a young Navy pilot who washed out of training returns to his farming community, where he's shunned by his father and neighbors and faces an impending locust swarm. Starring: Ben Johnson, Ron Howard, Katherine Helmond, Lisa Gerritsen
224	6.11	Trapped Beneath the Sea	Disaster	October 22, 1974	Tuesday
Fictional Coast Guard inquest into the failed rescue of four men trapped in a civilian research submersible entangled in a sunken wreck. Starring: Lee J. Cobb, Joshua Bryant*, Paul Michael Glaser*, Barra Grant*, Warren Kemmerling*, Cliff Potts*, Laurie Prange*, Martin Balsam**, Howard K. Smith (voiceover narration) Inspired by the Johnson Sea Link accident.
225	6.12	Bad Ronald	Thriller	October 23, 1974	Wednesday
Ronald's ill mother builds a hiding place inside their house to fool the police after he accidentally kills a neighborhood girl, but when she unexpectedly dies, Ronald spies on the family who moves into the house. Starring: Scott Jacoby, Pippa Scott, John Larch, Dabney Coleman, Kim Hunter, Lisa Eilbacher, Cindy Eilbacher, Cindy Fisher, John Fiedler
226	6.13	The Mark of Zorro	Adventure	October 29, 1974	Tuesday
Don Diego, returning from Madrid, secretly takes up the mantle of Zorro after finding that his father has been usurped as alcalde of Los Angeles by an oppressive despot. Starring: Frank Langella, Ricardo Montalbán, Gilbert Roland, Louise Sorel, Robert Middleton, Anne Archer, Yvonne De Carlo Unsold pilot, remake of The Mark of Zorro, with the teleplay adapted from John Taintor Foote's screenplay and music adapted from Alfred Newman's score.
227	6.14	Death Cruise	Drama/mystery	October 30, 1974	Wednesday
Three couples given free tickets to a Caribbean cruise experience marital problems before they are murdered one by one. Starring: Richard Long, Polly Bergen, Edward Albert, Kate Jackson, Tom Bosley, Celeste Holm, Michael Constantine, Cesare Danova Produced by Aaron Spelling, with the non-mystery aspects very similar to his later 1977-86 TV series The Love Boat; Richard Long's final role before his sudden death.
228	6.15	The Great Ice Rip-Off	Caper	November 6, 1974	Wednesday
A gang of thieves separately pull diamond heists along the West Coast and gradually assemble on a Greyhound bus with their spoils, but they have to contend with a dogged retired cop on board who is obsessed with the case and beginning to see a pattern. Starring: Lee J. Cobb, Gig Young, Matt Clark, Robert Walden, Geoffrey Lewis, Grayson Hall**
229	6.16	All the Kind Strangers	Thriller	November 12, 1974	Tuesday
A photojournalist finds himself a captive of an orphaned family in a remote farmhouse who want new parents. Starring: Stacy Keach, Samantha Eggar, John Savage, Robby Benson
230	6.17	The Gun	Drama	November 13, 1974	Wednesday
A pistol passes from frightened homeowner to potential workplace shooter, barrio family, theater robbery, police disposal and, finally, a child's accident. Starring: Stephen Elliot, David Huffman, John Sylvester White, Mariclare Costello Anthology of stories about a single firearm.
231	6.18	It Couldn't Happen to a Nicer Guy	Comedy	November 19, 1974	Tuesday
A middle-aged family man hitchhiking home is abducted and molested by a beautiful young woman, then finds himself disbelieved and ridiculed. Starring: Paul Sorvino, Michael Learned, Adam Arkin, Bob Dishy, Jo Anna Cameron, Graham Jarvis
232	6.19	Panic on the 5:22	Crime drama	November 20, 1974	Wednesday
Three armed men rob a private lounge car full of wealthy passengers on a Metro-North commuter train. Starring: Bernie Casey, Lynda Day George, Andrew Duggan, Dana Elcar, Laurence Luckinbill, James Sloyan, Robert Walden, Eduard Franz, Reni Santoni, Linden Chiles, Robert Mandan, Ina Balin Produced by Quinn Martin.
233	6.20	The Godchild	Western	November 26, 1974	Tuesday
Remake of 3 Godfathers; three Union POWs fleeing across the desert to escape both their Confederate pursuers and rampaging Apaches come across a dying woman and her infant child. They promise the woman that they will take care of the child and get it to safety, even though none of them knows anything whatsoever about children or babies. Starring: Jack Palance, Jack Warden, Ed Lauter, Keith Carradine, Jesse Vint, Fionnula Flanagan
234	6.21	Betrayal	Crime thriller	December 3, 1974	Tuesday
A lonely widow hires a young woman as her companion. What she doesn't know is that the woman and her boyfriend are extortionists, who are planning on making her their next victim, then killing her when they get her money. Starring: Amanda Blake, Tisha Sterling, Dick Haymes, Sam Groom, Britt Leach
235	6.22	Only with Married Men	Comedy	December 4, 1974	Wednesday
A girl decides that she will only date married men, and she runs into a bachelor who tells women that he is married in order to avoid long-term commitments. Starring: David Birney, Michele Lee, John Astin, Judy Carne, Dom DeLuise, Gavin MacLeod
236	6.23	The Tribe	Historical drama	December 11, 1974	Wednesday
A Cro-Magnon clan struggles against misfortune, sparse prey and hostile Neanderthals. Starring: Victor French, Warren Vanders, Henry Wilcoxon, Adriana Shaw, Stewart Moss Music by David Shire.
237	6.24	Roll, Freddy, Roll!	Comedy	December 17, 1974	Tuesday
A mild-mannered father tries to regain the admiration of his young son by setting the Guinness world endurance record on roller skates. Starring: Tim Conway, Barra Grant, Jan Murray, Scott Brady, Robert Hogan, Henry Jones, Ruta Lee Written and produced by Bill Persky and Sam Denoff (That Girl).
238	6.25	Let's Switch!	Comedy	January 7, 1975	Tuesday
A harried housewife and a frazzled women's magazine editor-in-chief swap careers and families for a week to experience how the other half lives. Starring: Barbara Eden, Barbara Feldon, Barra Grant, Penny Marshall, Joyce Van Patten, Richard Schaal, Pat Harrington, Ron Glass
239	6.26	The Missing Are Deadly	Thriller	January 8, 1975	Wednesday
A teenage boy steals a lab mouse from his father's virology institute to get attention, not knowing it is infected with contagious, deadly bacteria. Starring: Ed Nelson, Leonard Nimoy, Gary Morgan, Kathleen Quinlan, Marjorie Lord, José Ferrer**
240	6.27	Satan's Triangle	Horror	January 14, 1975	Tuesday
A Coast Guard team answering a distress call in the Bermuda Triangle finds a sole survivor on a boat and possibly demonic forces at work. Starring: Kim Novak, Doug McClure, Alejandro Rey, Ed Lauter, Jim Davis, Michael Conrad
241	6.28	The Hatfields and the McCoys	Western/drama	January 15, 1975	Wednesday
Condensed but relatively faithful retelling of the legendary Hatfield–McCoy feud. Starring: Jack Palance, Steve Forrest, Richard Hatch, Karen Lamm, James Keach, Robert Carradine, John Calvin, Gerrit Graham, Morgan Woodward
242	6.29	The Abduction of Saint Anne	Drama	January 21, 1975	Tuesday
A cynical detective and a Roman Catholic bishop team up to investigate the reported miraculous powers of a seventeen-year-old girl being held captive in the house of her father, an ailing mobster-kingpin. Starring: Robert Wagner, Kathleen Quinlan, Lloyd Nolan, E.G. Marshall, William Windom, Ruth McDevitt, A Martinez, Milton Selzer, James Gregory, Martha Scott, Victor Mohica
243	6.30	The Daughters of Joshua Cabe Return	Western	January 28, 1975	Tuesday
The "daughters" settle down to life on the Cabe farm, but the real father of one of the women – a treacherous deserter – arrives with a scheme to use her. Starring: Dan Dailey, Dub Taylor, Ronne Troup, Christina Hart, Brooke Adams, Kathleen Freeman, Carl Betz** Second unsold pilot for a TV series; the first of two sequels to The Daughters of Joshua Cabe (4.02), followed by The New Daughters of Joshua Cabe (which, unlike the other two movies, was not an ABC Movie of the Week).
244	6.31	All Together Now	Drama	February 5, 1975	Wednesday
Four orphaned children have 30 days to prove that they can remain together as a family without adult supervision. Starring: John Rubinstein, Glynnis O'Connor, Brad Savage, Helen Hunt, Dori Brenner, Bill Macy, Jane Withers
245	6.32	The Trial of Chaplain Jensen	Drama	February 11, 1975	Tuesday
The story of the only Naval chaplain and officer ever court-martialed on charges of adultery after accusations by two Navy wives. Starring: James Franciscus, Joanna Miles, Lynda Day George, Dorothy Tristan, Harris Yulin, Charles Durning** Based on the autobiographical account by Andrew Jensen, with Martin Abramson.
246	6.33	A Cry for Help	Drama	February 12, 1975	Wednesday
A cynical radio talk-show host who insults his audience changes his behaviour when he receives a call from a suicidal teenage girl. Starring: Robert Culp, Elayne Heilveil, Ken Swofford, Julius Harris, Michael Lerner
247	6.34	The Family Nobody Wanted	Drama	February 19, 1975	Wednesday
A minister and his wife take in poor and troubled children that nobody else wants, and soon they find themselves with a family of more than a dozen kids. Starring: Shirley Jones, James Olson, Katherine Helmond, Woodrow Parfrey, Beeson Carroll, Claudia Bryar, Ann Doran, C. Lindsay Workman
248	6.35	You Lie So Deep, My Love	Drama	February 25, 1975	Tuesday
A disturbed man wants his girlfriend's love and his wife's money, and will stop at nothing to get them, even murder. Starring: Don Galloway, Barbara Anderson, Angel Tompkins, Walter Pidgeon, Anne Schedeen, Russell Johnson, Virginia Gregg.
249	6.36	Someone I Touched	Drama	February 26, 1975	Wednesday
A woman discovers she is pregnant, while also learning her husband was unfaithful and contracted syphilis. The infection spreads to Laura and puts their unborn child at risk, forcing the couple to face the emotional and medical fallout. Starring: Cloris Leachman, James Olson, Andrew Robinson, Glynnis O'Connor, Lenka Peterson, Kenneth Mars
250	6.37	Trilogy of Terror	Horror	March 4, 1975	Tuesday
Self-contained anthology with Karen Black in three unrelated roles. Followed by two sequels, Dead of Night (1977) and, years later, Trilogy of Terror II (1996) (neither of which, unlike the first movie, was an ABC Movie of the Week). The first two movies were unsold pilots for a horror anthology TV series to be called Dead of Night.
251	6.38	The Desperate Miles	Drama	March 5, 1975	Wednesday
A disabled Vietnam vet sets out to prove that disabled people don't have to be helpless by starting a 180-mile trip in a wheelchair. On the way he finds his life is endangered by a deranged truck driver. Starring: Tony Musante, Joanna Pettet, Jeanette Nolan, Lynn Loring, John Larch
252	6.39	Dead Man on the Run	Drama	April 2, 1975	Wednesday
A federal agent links his colleague's murder to an assassination cover-up in New Orleans. Starring: Peter Graves, Katherine Justice, Pernell Roberts, John Anderson, Diana Douglas
253	6.40	The Swiss Family Robinson	Historical drama	April 15, 1975	Tuesday
The shipwrecked Robinsons are endangered when a greedy Englishman leads a pirate expedition to the island, in search of a priceless golden idol. Starring: Martin Milner, Pat Delaney, Michael-James Wixted, Eric Olsen, Cindy Fisher, Cameron Mitchell, John Vernon*, George DiCenzo, John Crawford Pilot for Irwin Allen's 1975-76 TV series The Swiss Family Robinson, wherein two of the children were recast.
254	6.41	Returning Home	Drama	April 29, 1975	Tuesday
The story of three returning World War II veterans, and how they try to cope with returning to civilian life. Starring Dabney Coleman, Tom Selleck, James R. Miller, Whitney Blake, Joan Goodfellow, Sherry Jackson, Laurie Walters, James A. Watson Jr. Remake of The Best Years of Our Lives.
255	6.42	Starsky & Hutch	Police drama	April 30, 1975	Wednesday
Two unorthodox LAPD detectives set out to find a pair of hit men responsible for the murders of two teenage lovers. Starring: Paul Michael Glaser, David Soul, Michael Lerner, Michael Conrad Pilot for the 1975-79 TV series of the same name premiering in September.
256	6.43	Matt Helm	Mystery	May 7, 1975	Wednesday
Matt Helm, a former secret agent, now a private investigator, is hired to protect a beautiful film star and gets involved with gun runners. Starring: Anthony Franciosa, Ann Turkel, Laraine Stephens, Patrick Macnee, John Vernon Pilot for the 1975-76 TV series of the same name premiering in September.
257	6.42	The First 36 Hours of Dr. Durant	Drama	May 13, 1975	Tuesday
A young doctor fresh out of medical school takes a job at a big-city hospital, and on his first day finds himself making life-and-death decisions. Starring: Scott Hylands, Alex Henteloff, Renne Jarrett, Dana Andrews, David Doyle, Katherine Helmond, Peter Donat, Karen Carlson, Dennis Patrick, Lawrence Pressman
258	6.44	Promise Him Anything	Comedy	May 14, 1975	Wednesday
A young bachelor uses a computer dating service and gets matched with a woman whose profile claims "anything goes." When he meets her and discovers she does not live up to that description, he sues her for breach of contract. Starring: Frederic Forrest, Meg Foster, William Schallert, Tom Ewell, Eddie Albert, Joyce Jameson, Aldo Ray

== See also ==
- List of television films produced for American Broadcasting Company
- The New CBS Tuesday Night Movies - CBS's weekly television movie program
