= Some Will, Some Won't =

1970 British film by Duncan Wood

- British theatrical poster
- Directed by: Duncan Wood
- Written by: Geoffrey Jones; Lewis Schwarz
- Based on: Laughter in Paradise screenplay by Jack Davies & Michael Pertwee
- Produced by: Giulio Zampi
- Starring: Ronnie Corbett; Thora Hird; Michael Hordern; Barbara Murray; Leslie Phillips
- Cinematography: Harry Waxman
- Edited by: Gerry Hambling
- Music by: Howard Blake
- Production companies: Associated British Productions Ltd. Giulio Zampi Productions (as Transocean)
- Distributed by: Warner-Pathé Distributors (UK)
- Release date: April 1970 (UK)
- Running time: 87 minutes
- Country: United Kingdom
- Language: English

Some Will, Some Won't is a 1970 British comedy film directed by Duncan Wood, starring an ensemble British cast including Michael Hordern, Ronnie Corbett, Dennis Price, Leslie Phillips and Arthur Lowe. It is a remake of Laughter in Paradise (1951). It was written by Geoffrey Jones and Lewis Schwarz.

In Henry Russell's will, four family members are left £150,000 on condition they do the bizarre tasks Russell has set out for them.

== Plot ==
In his will, eccentric practical joker Henry Russell leaves his four relatives £150,000 each, but with stipulations designed to make each of them step completely out of character, and prove themselves as human beings. Bossy Agnes Russell must work as a maid for a month, Herbert must overcome his natural shyness and rob a bank, woman chasing bachelor Simon has to marry the first single woman he speaks to, and crime writer Denniston is asked to commit a crime and be sent to jail for a month. When the four individuals report back to the executor, their lives are transformed for the better. But Henry still has one more surprise up his sleeve.

== Cast ==
- Ronnie Corbett as Herbert Russell
- Thora Hird as Agnes Russell
- Michael Hordern as Denniston Russell
- Barbara Murray as Lucille Grayson
- Leslie Phillips as Simon Russell
- Wilfrid Brambell as Henry Russell
- Dennis Price as Benson
- James Robertson Justice as Sir Charles Robson
- Sheila Steafel as Sheila Wilcott
- Eleanor Summerfield as Elizabeth Robson
- Arthur Lowe as Police Sergeant
- Harold Goodwin as Williams
- Noel Howlett as Endicott, solicitor
- Diana King as Mrs. Craik
- Stephen Lewis as Police Constable Arthur
- Norman Mitchell as policeman
- John Nettleton as Wagstaff
- Brian Oulton as Mr. Dale
- Frank Thornton as hotel manager
- David Lander as Ricci
- Claire Davenport as blowzy woman
- Robin Tolhurst as Lettie
- Vicki Woolf as Janine

== Production ==
Laughter in Paradise (1951) was produced by Mario Zampi and edited by his son Giulio. In the late 1960s Associated British decided to remake the film, with Giulo Zampi producing (Mario Zampi died in 1963). The movie was supervised by Nat Cohen's unit, Anglo-Amalgamated. When Associated British was sold to EMI Films the movie became an early release for EMI.

Filming started in March 1969 and took seven weeks. It was released in April 1970.

== Critical reception ==
The Monthly Film Bulletin wrote: "Tired remake of the 1951 Laughter in Paradise. This kind of Ealing comedy idea died with the Fifties, but no one involved here seems to have noticed since the only concession to nearly twenty years of changing values is the fact that the four beneficiaries of the practical joker's will now stand to inherit three times more than they did in the original. Humour, unfortunately, keeps pace with inflation: laboriously directed, the film visibly strains over some well-tried situation comedy formulas. But though the cast work hard, only Michael Hordern as the put-upon crime novelist (Alastair Sim in the original) manages to raise a reluctant smile, notably during his frantic efforts at conspicuous shop-lifting in a crowded department store. It all ends, after a singularly weak sting in the tail, with the cast rolling about in laughter; but there won't be many joining them when there's better comedy to be seen on television most nights of the week."

David Parkinson, reviewing in the Radio Times, commented: Some people really will find this comic calamity funny, but they'll be in a very small minority. Laughter in Paradise was a patchy, but thoroughly amiable slice of whimsy .... If this insipid remake is supposed to be a comedy, however, it's not only an insult to the memory of the original, but it also breaches the Trades Descriptions Act. What makes this an even more depressing experience is the utter waste of a cast ... as the quartet forced to humiliate themselves to benefit from joker Wilfrid Brambell's will. If you hear any laughter, it'll be the chortling spirit of Laughter in Paradise director Mario Zampi.

Sight and Sound, reviewing the film in 1995, called it "thoroughly feeble".
