= Eleanor Summerfield =

British actress (1921–2001)

- Born: Eleanor Audrey Summerfield; 7 March 1921; St Pancras, London, England
- Died: 13 July 2001 (aged 80); Westminster, London, England
- Education: Royal Academy of Dramatic Art
- Occupation: Actress
- Years active: 1936–1983
- Spouse: Leonard Sachs (m. 1947; died 1990)
- Children: 2, including Robin Sachs

Eleanor Audrey Summerfield (7 March 1921 – 13 July 2001) was an English actress who appeared in many plays, films and television series. She is known for her roles in Laughter in Paradise (1951), Final Appointment (1954), Odongo (1956), Dentist in the Chair (1960), On the Fiddle (1961), The Running Man (1963) and Some Will, Some Won't (1970).

== Early life and career ==
She was born as Eleanor Audrey Summerfield in St Pancras, London, on 7 March 1921. Summerfield trained at the Royal Academy of Dramatic Art in 1937.

Summerfield made her screen debut in the 1946 television drama A Phoenix Too Frequent, which was based on a play of the same name. Her first stage show was Her Excellency at the London Hippodrome in 1949. In the mid-1960s, she played P. G. Wodehouse's character Aunt Dahlia on the black-and-white television series The World of Wooster (1965–1967) aired on BBC One. She was also a regular member in the panel game Just a Minute and was a team member for the entire 15-year run of Many a Slip (1964–1979). During her career spanning nearly half a century, she appeared in a number of films and television series. Other TV series she appeared in included Lovejoy: Season 2: Episode 5, 1991 "Who Dares, Sings" as May Walker; and Midsomer Murders: Series 1: Episode 4, 1998 "Faithful Until Death" as Elfrida Molfrey.

== Personal life and death ==
Summerfield was married to actor Leonard Sachs from 1947 until his death in 1990. They had two sons, including Robin Sachs.

She died in Westminster, London, on 13 July 2001, aged 80.

== Filmography ==
- Take My Life (1947) - Miss Carteret
- London Belongs to Me (1948) - The Blonde
- The Weaker Sex (1948) - Clippie (uncredited)
- The Story of Shirley Yorke (1948) - Doris
- All Over the Town (1949) - Beryl Hopper
- Man on the Run (1949) - May Baker, Anchor Hotel
- No Way Back (1949) - Beryl
- The Third Visitor (1951) - Vera Kurton
- Laughter in Paradise (1951) - Sheila Wilcott
- Scrooge (1951) - Miss Flora
- The Last Page (1952) - Vi
- Mandy (1952) - Lily Tabor
- Top Secret (1952) - Cecilia
- Street Corner (1953) - Edna Hurran
- Isn't Life Wonderful! (1953) - Aunt Kate
- Face the Music (1954) - Barbara Quigley
- Murder by Proxy (aka Blackout) (1954) - Margaret 'Maggie' Doone
- Final Appointment (1954) - Jenny
- Lost (1956) - Sgt. Cook
- Odongo (1956) - Celia Watford
- It's Great to Be Young (1956) - Barmaid
- No Road Back (1957) - Marguerite
- A Cry from the Streets (1958) - Gloria
- Dentist in the Chair (1960) - Ethel
- The Millionairess (1960) - Mrs. Willoughby
- Carry On Regardless (1961) - Mrs. Riley (part cut) (uncredited)
- Spare the Rod (1961) - Mrs. Harkness
- Don't Bother to Knock (1961) - Mother
- On the Fiddle (1961) - Flora McNaughton
- Petticoat Pirates (1961) - Chief Wren Mabel Rawlins
- Guns of Darkness (1962) - Mrs. Bastian
- On the Beat (1962) - Sgt. Lucilla Wilkins
- The Running Man (1963) - Hilda Tanner
- The Yellow Hat (1966) - Lady Xenia
- The Spy Killer (1969, ABC Movie of the Week) - Mrs. Roberts
- Foreign Exchange (1970, ABC Movie of the Week) - Mrs. Roberts
- Some Will, Some Won't (1970) - Elizabeth Robson
- The Watcher in the Woods (1981) - Mrs. Thayer
- The Island of Adventure (1982) - Aunt Polly
