= Hail, Hero! =

1969 film directed by David Miller

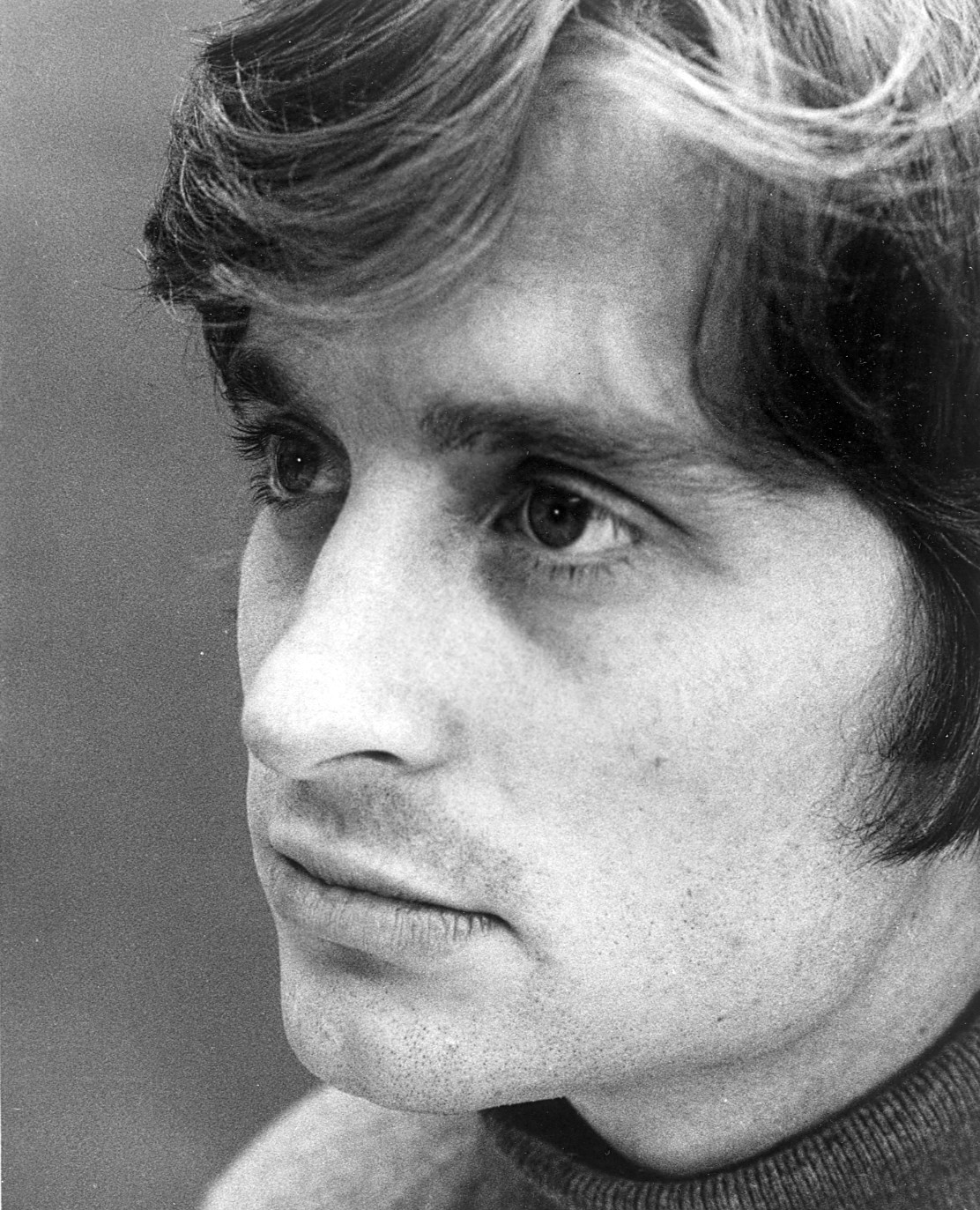
- Michael Douglas in a publicity photograph
- Directed by: David Miller
- Screenplay by: David Manber
- Based on: Hail, Hero! (1968, OCLC 436308) by John Weston
- Produced by: Harold D. Cohen
- Starring: Michael Douglas; Peter Strauss; Arthur Kennedy; Teresa Wright; Deborah Winters
- Cinematography: Robert B. Hauser
- Edited by: John McSweeney Jr.
- Music by: Gordon Lightfoot; Jerome Moross
- Production company: Cinema Center Films
- Distributed by: National General Pictures
- Release date: October 4, 1969
- Running time: 97 minutes
- Country: United States
- Language: English

Hail, Hero! is a 1969 drama film directed by David Miller, starring Michael Douglas, Deborah Winters and Peter Strauss. David Manber wrote the screenplay based on the novel by John Weston. The picture was produced by Harold D. Cohen and was the feature film debut for Douglas and for Peter Strauss. It was a critical and commercial failure.

== Plot ==
During the Vietnam War, hippie college student Carl Dixon unexpectedly quits school and joins the Army. Before his enlistment begins he returns to confront his family.

The action takes place during a single day and night on the Dixon family's prosperous ranch (described in some reviews as Soledad Valley, California, in others as Arizona). He does not initially tell his parents or his brother about his enlistment. The family loathes him because he crippled his brother, who is his parents' favorite, by throwing a snake that caused his brother's horse to fall on him several years before. His father forcibly cuts off his long hair, and his mother is remote and unsympathetic. Carl believes she is having an affair with Conklin, a family friend who runs an "old age home."

The tensions in the family culminate when Carl gives his brother a mummified Native American baby at his birthday party, horrifying his mother and antagonizing his father and the guests, who include two prominent politicians who were planning to recruit the father as a candidate. During the party Carl confronts Conklin with his suspicions about the affair with his mother. Conklin does not answer but takes Carl to the old age home where he ruminates on mortality.

Carl reconciles with his brother but not his parents, and after painting a mural on the side of a barn he leaves the ranch to commence his enlistment. A final edit of the film, just prior to release, removed shots showing his parents joining him in creating the mural.

== Cast ==
- Michael Douglas as Carl Dixon
- Arthur Kennedy as Albert Dixon, Carl's father
- Teresa Wright as Santha Dixon, Carl's mother
- Peter Strauss as Frank Dixon, Carl's younger brother
- John Larch as Mr. Conklin
- Charles Drake as Senator Murchiston
- Mercer Harris as Jimmy
- Deborah Winters as Becky
- John Qualen as Billy Hurd
- James Nusser as Max

== Production ==
David Miller initially rejected Douglas for the part. Douglas's biographer, Marc Eliot, recounts that Miller was not initially aware he was Kirk Douglas's son. When Michael Douglas's agent told him about that, with his client's knowledge, it "resonated with Miller and not necessarily in a positive way" as Miller had negative experiences with the father when directing him in Lonely Are the Brave. Douglas Eliot writes that Michael was chosen for the part "perhaps to make amends," to end what he felt was an industry-wide ban instigated by Kirk, or perhaps because he felt Michael was best for the role.

Douglas was frequently asked whether his father had helped him get the role, which he denied, saying that he was cast on the strength of his performance in the CBS Playhouse drama The Experiment, and such questions "visibly annoyed him." Kirk Douglas denied that he played a role in the casting of his son. However in a 1970 interview, after appearing in another failed movie, Adam at Six A.M., Michael said "Of course it's helped being the son of Kirk Douglas." The relationship, he said, "gets you past the front door but can't get the job for you. That's up to you."

Gordon Lightfoot contributed two songs to the soundtrack, the title song (co-written with Jerome Moross) and "Wherefore And Why", an "alternate, slightly faster take" of the first track of Did She Mention My Name? No soundtrack album was released.

A key scene in the film was changed shortly before the film's release. In both the novel and the film, "Carl spends his last night at home painting the side of his father's barn with a Pop war mural—flowers, bombs, flaming planes and an American flag in which hearts have replaced the stars. In the novel (and in the film before it was ... re-edited), Carl's mother ... and father joined him in this act of affirmation."

Deirdre Flynn, daughter of Errol Flynn, who then was working as a stunt performer, was Douglas's stand-in during filming of the movie.

== Reception ==
Writing two months after the film's October 1969 release, United Press International Hollywood correspondent Vernon Scott wrote that the film was "acclaimed universally by critics as a bomb of hydrogen proportions." Scott wrote that Douglas received some praise for his performance, but that it failed at the box office as well as with critics. He wrote that Douglas was "still in shock" about that.

In the New York Times, film critic Vincent Canby wrote that in Hail, Hero! "you can see Kirk Douglas, even younger than he was in The Champion in 1949, in the person of his 25-year-old son, Michael." Canby was critical of the film, however, saying that Miller's direction was "pretentious" and "never misses an opportunity to state the obvious." Canby also included the movie in his list of “ten worst films of 1969” for the paper: “The movie is so fearless in tackling contemporary issues that it doesn’t even mention the name of the war the boy is going to fight.”

New York Daily News film critic Kathleen Carroll gave the film two and a half out of four stars. She wrote that while there were "moments of truth" in the film, they were "sandwiched between painfully contrived scenes, such as the embittered brother's instant about-face, that are simply unbelievable." She noted that the word "Vietnam" is never mentioned, and that "one still doesn't understand what a nice pacifist like him is doing in a war."

In the Los Angeles Times, critic Charles Champlin criticized the film for "posturing" and attempting to patronize young movie-goers. He wrote that the motive of the character in joining the Army, whether "an act of suicide, inverted defiance, or an act of contrition toward his hating father and his brother" was not clear to him, and that he found happy ending to be "hokum in the oldest Hollywood tradition."

TV Guide called it a "talky, uninspired attempt to bring 60s-style 'relevance' to the screen."

Michael Douglas was nominated for Golden Globe Award for New Star of the Year – Actor for his performance in the film.

== Home media ==
Hail, Hero! was released on DVD by CBS DVD (distributed by Paramount Home Entertainment) on September 3, 2019 as a Region 1 DVD.

== See also ==
- List of American films of 1969
