= Robert Horton (actor) =

American actor (1924–2016)

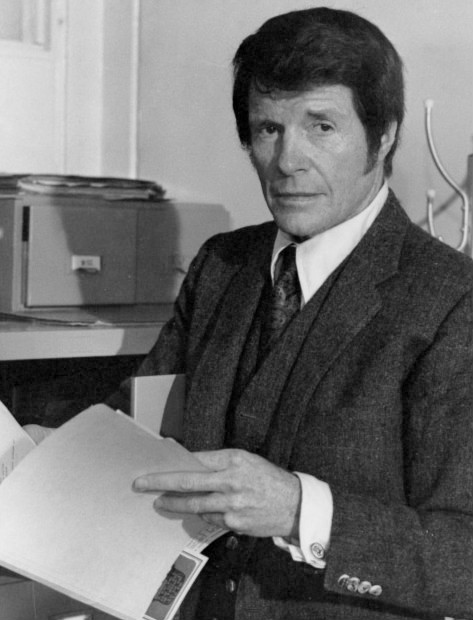
- Horton in Police Woman (1976)
- Born: Mead Howard Horton Jr. July 29, 1924; Los Angeles, California, U.S.
- Died: March 9, 2016 (aged 91); Los Angeles, California, U.S.
- Education: UCLA
- Occupations: Actor; singer
- Years active: 1945–1989
- Political party: Republican
- Spouses: Mary Jobe (m. 1946; div. 1950); Barbara Ruick (m. 1953; div. 1956); Marilynn Bradley (m. 1960)
- Website: www.roberthorton.com

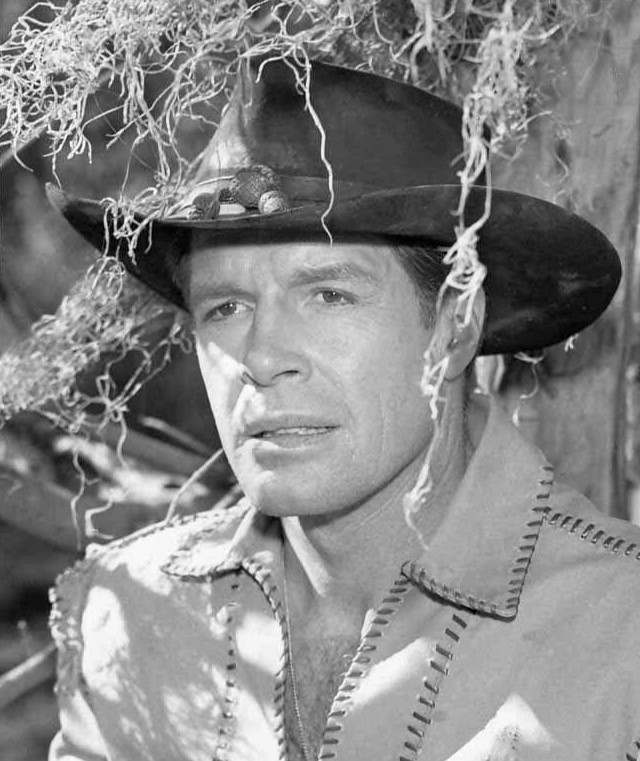
Horton in Wagon Train, 1957

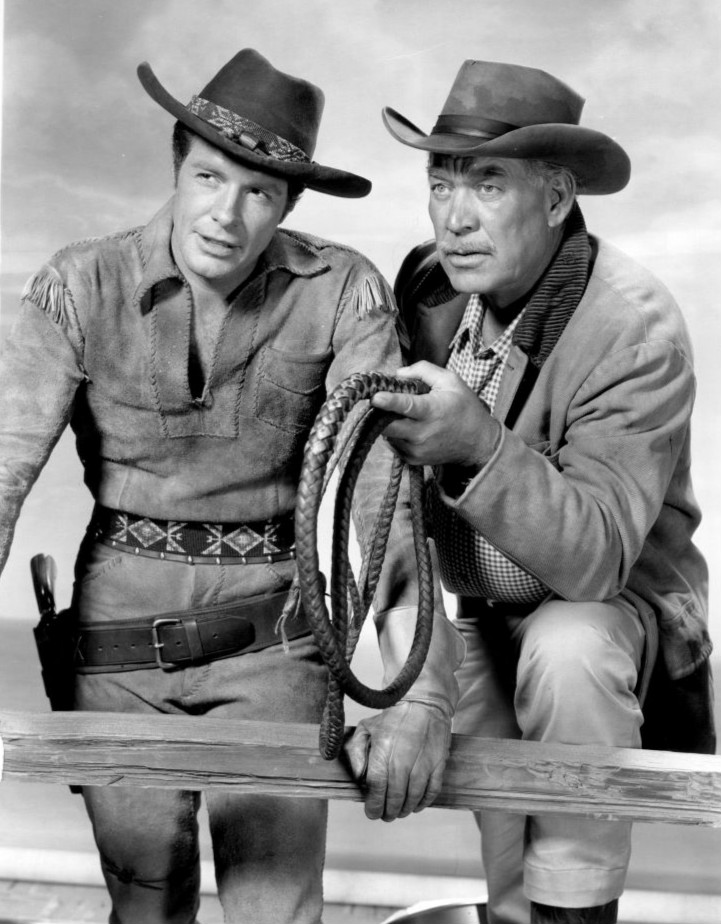
Horton and Ward Bond in Wagon Train, 1957

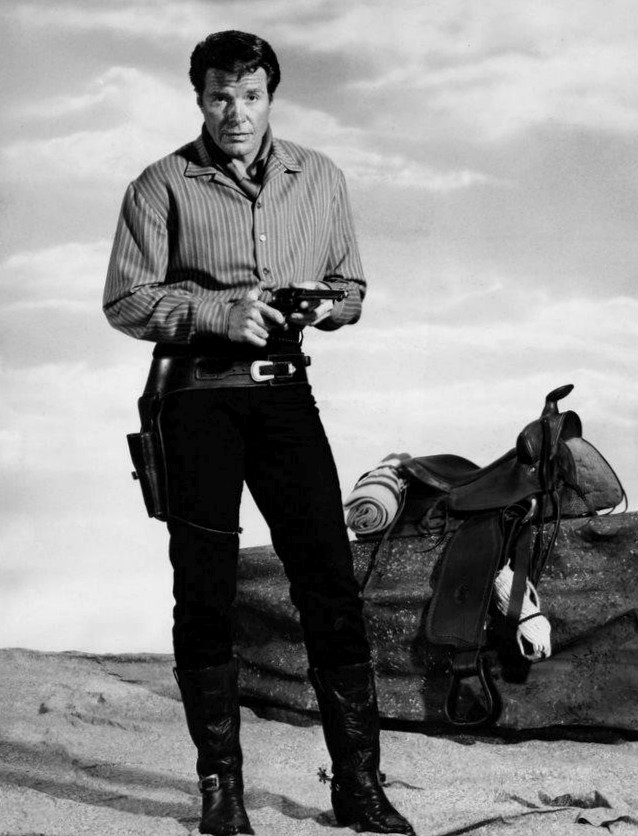
Horton in A Man Called Shenandoah, 1965

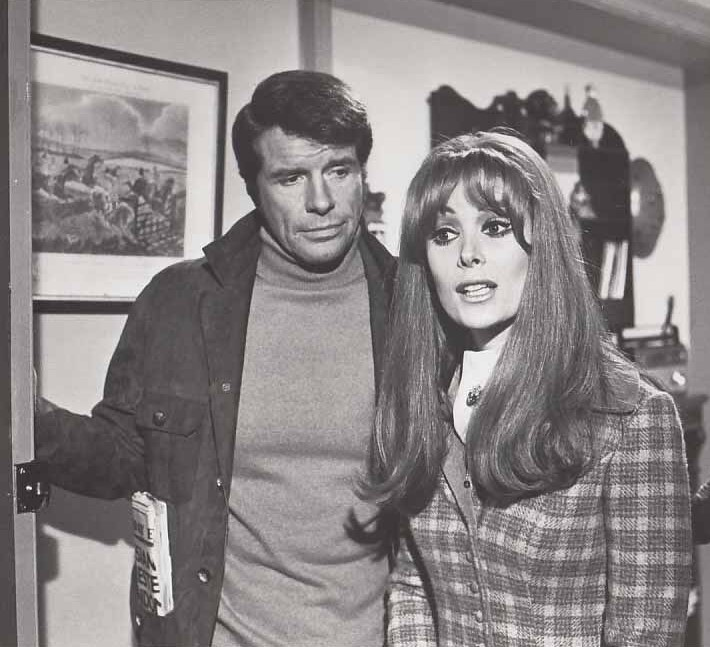
Horton and Jill St. John in The Spy Killer (1969)

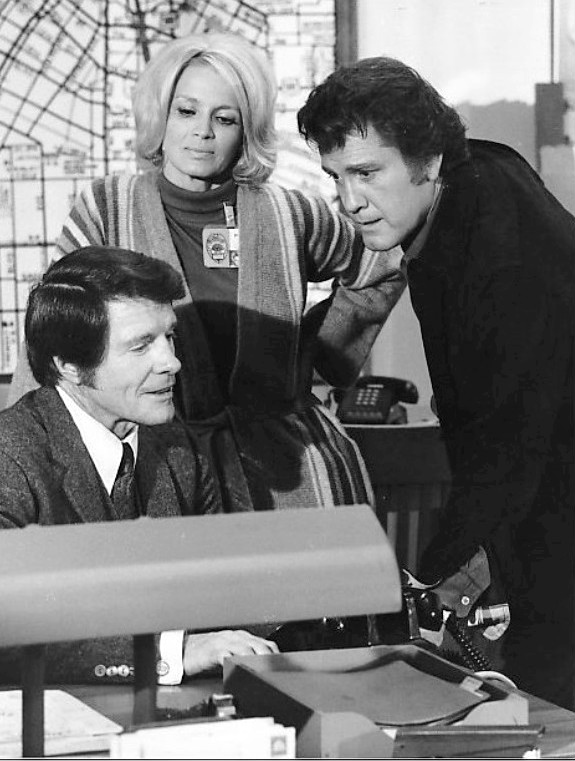
Horton, Angie Dickinson and Earl Holliman in Police Woman, 1976

Mead Howard "Robert" Horton Jr. (July 29, 1924 – March 9, 2016) was an American actor and singer. He is known for playing Flint McCullough on Wagon Train (1957–1962).

== Early life ==
One of two sons, Mead Howard Horton Jr. was born on July 29, 1924, in Los Angeles. His parents were Mead Howard Horton Sr. and Chelta McMurrin.

Horton said that he never felt he fitted into his proper Latter-day Saint household because at times he was rather impetuous. He survived several surgeries in childhood, including hernia repair and treatment for an enlarged kidney. Horton attended the California Military Institute in Perris, where he played football. After graduation in 1943 at age 19, he enlisted in the Coast Guard, but was medically discharged because of his kidney.

In 1945, a chance encounter with a talent scout led to an uncredited part in Lewis Milestone's film A Walk in the Sun (1945). He first studied dramatics at the University of Miami but later changed schools and graduated cum laude from UCLA.

== Career ==
Horton's experience on stage included work with the American Theatre Wing in New York City, where he was the "resident leading man". Horton had a test option with Metro-Goldwyn-Mayer and tested for The Naked Spur in February 1952. Following the try-out, MGM signed him to a long-term contract, but loaned him out the following day to 20th Century Fox to appear in Pony Soldier (1952). His first major TV role was in Ford Theatre in the episode "Portrait of Lydia" on December 16, 1954.

In his six decades of television, Horton, who became known for his voice, was most noted for his role as the frontier scout Flint McCullough in the television series Wagon Train from 1957 to 1962. His co-stars were Ward Bond, John McIntire, Terry Wilson, and Frank McGrath. He eventually quit the series to pursue a career in musical theater.

His role on Wagon Train was taken by Robert Fuller as the scout Cooper Smith. Fuller, a veteran of the western series Laramie, resembled Horton, and the two actors coincidentally shared the same birthday, albeit nine years apart.

Horton played Drake McHugh, Ronald Reagan's role in the television version of Kings Row (1955), which featured Jack Kelly, and ran for seven episodes as part of the Warner Bros. Presents series, rotating with a television version of Casablanca and Cheyenne, starring Clint Walker.

The ruggedly handsome Horton made dozens of appearances in movies and television shows between 1951 and 1989, including a small role in the film Bright Road starring Dorothy Dandridge, an episode of Ray Milland's sitcom Meet Mr. McNutley and on the syndicated Sheriff of Cochise, starring John Bromfield. Horton played Corporal Tom Vaughn in an episode "False Prophet" (1956) on Crossroads.

Horton appeared on seven episodes of Alfred Hitchcock Presents, including memorably as a tennis-playing insurance investigator and blackmailer opposite Betsy von Furstenberg in "The Disappearing Trick", directed by Arthur Hiller. He was cast as Danny Barnes in the episode "No Place to Hide" of The DuPont Show with June Allyson as well as appeared on the interview program Here's Hollywood and NBC's anthology series The Barbara Stanwyck Show. He appeared several times on The Ford Show, Starring Tennessee Ernie Ford.

In the 1960s, Horton made two 45 RPM singles on the Columbia Records label: "The Very Thought of You"/"Hey There" and "King of the Road"/"Julie". The former's A-side was also the title track of an album he released on the same label.

Horton performed for many years in theaters and nightclubs all over America, and in Australia as a singer (sometimes with his wife, the former Marilynn Bradley). In 1963, producer David Merrick hired him as the male lead in the musical version of N. Richard Nash's play The Rainmaker (titled 110 in the Shade). The musical, with a score by Tom Jones and Harvey Schmidt, ran for 330 performances on Broadway.

Horton is also remembered for his offbeat role as an amnesiac in the 1965–1966 television series A Man Called Shenandoah.

In 1966, he starred in The Dangerous Days of Kiowa Jones, the first Western made specifically for television and simultaneous distribution to cinemas in Europe. It was made by MGM and co-starred Sal Mineo and Diane Baker.

In 1968, two years later, Horton co-starred in The Green Slime, a low-budget Japanese-American science fiction film, directed by Kinji Fukasaku and shot entirely in Japan, but with an American and European cast. His character, Jack Rankin, leads the crew of a space station, in a battle for survival, against one-eyed tentacled aliens that rapidly multiply, as they feed on the station's sources of electricity.

From 1983 to 1984, Horton took a turn in daytime soap operas, playing the part of Whit McColl on As the World Turns.

== Personal life ==
Horton was married to Mary Jobe from 1946 until 1950, and to Barbara Ruick from 1953 until 1956; both marriages ended in divorce. In 1960, he married Marilynn Bradley, and they remained married until his death in 2016.

Following his 85th birthday in 2009, Horton announced, through his publicist, that he no longer would be making any personal appearances because he had tired of traveling.

Horton was a licensed pilot and aircraft owner.

"His three greatest thrills were his first solo flight, a performance before Queen Elizabeth II, and being featured on Ralph Edwards' This Is Your Life. His frequent co-pilot was his French poodle, "Jamie"."

== Awards ==
He was the recipient of several lifetime achievement awards for television, including the Golden Boot in 2004, and also the Cowboy Spirit Award at the National Festival of the West. On his 90th birthday, he received the Western Legend Award.

== Death ==
Horton was injured in a fall in November 2015, and was placed in hospice care. He died on March 9, 2016, at the age of 91 in a Los Angeles rehabilitation clinic.

== Filmography ==
Year	Title	Role	Notes
1945	A Walk in the Sun	Jack	Uncredited
1951	The Tanks Are Coming	Captain Bob Horner	Uncredited
1952	Return of the Texan	Dr. Jim Harris	
1952	Apache War Smoke	Tom Herrera	
1952	Pony Soldier	Jess Calhoun	
1953	The Story of Three Loves	Friendly Young Man on Ship	Segment "Mademoiselle"; uncredited
1953	Bright Road	Dr. Mitchell	
1953	Code Two	Russ Hartley	
1953	Arena	Jackie Roach	
1954	Prisoner of War	Francis Aloysius Belney	
1954	Men of the Fighting Lady	Ensign Neil Conovan	
1956	The Man Is Armed	Dr. Michael Benning	
1956	Alfred Hitchcock Presents	Gil Larkin	Season 1 Episode 37: "Decoy"
1956	Alfred Hitchcock Presents	Mason Bridges	Season 2 Episode 9: "The Crack of Doom"
1956	Alfred Hitchcock Presents	John Fenton	Season 2 Episode 13: "Mr. Blanchard's Secret"
1957	Alfred Hitchcock Presents	Wallace Donaldson	Season 2 Episode 19: "A Bottle of Wine"
1958	Alfred Hitchcock Presents	Walter Richmond	Season 3 Episode 27: "Disappearing Trick"
1959	Alfred Hitchcock Presents	Brad Taylor	Season 4 Episode 18: "The Last Dark Step"
1960	Alfred Hitchcock Presents	Ray Marchand	Season 5 Episode 38: "Hooked"
1957–1962	Wagon Train	Flint McCullough	Last onscreen episode is Season 5, Episode 36; credit only in episode 37
1965–1966	A Man Called Shenandoah	"Shenandoah"	TV series
1966	The Dangerous Days of Kiowa Jones	Kiowa Jones	TV movie
1968	The Green Slime	Commander Jack Rankin	
1969	The Spy Killer	John Smith	ABC Movie of the Week
1970	Foreign Exchange	John Smith	ABC Movie of the Week
1976	Police Woman	Frank Armitage	
1988	Red River	Mr. Melville, Cattle Buyer	TV movie
1989	Murder, She Wrote	Jack Hutchings	
