= Harold D. Cohen =

American film producer

Harold D. Cohen (born c. 1926 - July 22, 2006) was an American film producer.

== Filmography ==
Year	Film	Notes
1969	Hail, Hero!	Producer
1969	The Spy Killer (TV movie)	Executive Producer
1970	Foreign Exchange (TV movie)	Executive producer
1970	I Walk the Line	Producer
1972	Second Chance (TV movie)	Producer
1973	Honor Thy Father (TV movie)	Producer
