= Second Chance (1972 film) =

- Written by: Michael Morrissey
- Directed by: Peter Tewksbury
- Starring: Brian Keith; Elizabeth Ashley; Kenneth Mars
- Country of origin: United States
- Original language: English

Production
- Producer: Harold D. Cohen
- Cinematography: Edward Rosson
- Editor: John B. Woelz
- Running time: 74 minutes

Original release
- Release: February 28, 1972

Second Chance is a 1972 American TV film, broadcast as an ABC Movie of the Week. Danny Thomas was executive producer.

== Plot ==
A stockbroker buys a Nevada ghost town and invites people who want a fresh start in life (a second chance) to populate it.

== Cast ==
- Brian Keith as Geoff Smith
- Elizabeth Ashley as Ellie Smith
- Kenneth Mars as Doctor Julius Roth
- William Windom as Stan Petryk
- Pat Carroll as Gloria Petryk
- Rosey Grier as Maxie Hill
- Juliet Prowse as Martha Foster
- Avery Schreiber as Roberto Gazzari
- Ned Wertimer as Charley Whitehead
- Ann Morgan Guilbert as Charlene
- Frank Parker as Hardin
