= Laughter in Paradise =

1951 British film by Mario Zampi

- Theatrical release poster
- Directed by: Mario Zampi
- Written by: Jack Davies; Michael Pertwee
- Produced by: Mario Zampi
- Starring: Alastair Sim; Fay Compton; George Cole; Guy Middleton
- Cinematography: William McLeod
- Edited by: Giulio Zampi
- Music by: Stanley Black
- Distributed by: Associated British-Pathe
- Release date: 13 June 1951
- Running time: 93 minutes
- Country: United Kingdom
- Language: English
- Box office: £256,579 (UK)

Laughter in Paradise is a 1951 British comedy film directed by Mario Zampi, starring Alastair Sim, Fay Compton, George Cole, and Guy Middleton. It was written by Jack Davies and Michael Pertwee.

The film was remade as Some Will, Some Won't in 1970.

== Plot ==
In his will, notorious practical joker Henry Russell leaves £50,000 to each of his four surviving relatives, provided they first perform prescribed tasks that are completely contrary to their natures.

Law-abiding retired army officer Deniston Russell, who writes lurid crime novels under several pen names, has a week to get himself arrested and jailed for exactly 28 days. Difficult, snobbish Agnes Russell has to find employment as a domestic servant in a middle-class home, again within a week, and keep her position for a month. Simon Russell, a penniless womanising con man, has to marry the first single woman he speaks to. Timid Herbert Russell has to hold up the bank manager he works for in his office, using a mask and a toy pistol, and obtain the bank keys for two minutes.

Deniston is thwarted repeatedly in his attempts, but finally manages to complete his task by smashing a shop window and assaulting a policeman. It costs him his fiancée Elizabeth when he is brought up before the magistrate, Elizabeth's father, but his secretary Sheila reveals her love for him and promises to stand by him.

Agnes finds work with the irascible, demanding Gordon Webb. When Gordon sacks her, she begs to stay for a month, finally offering to pay him £1000. He does change his mind, if only for the enjoyment of tormenting her further. He also hires a private detective, Roger Godfrey, to find out what she is up to. Roger falls in love with Gordon's long-suffering daughter Joan, who is unwilling to marry him as her father depends on her. After Agnes persuades the girl to seize the chance of happiness, Gordon first sacks her and then calls round to take her out to dinner.

Though the first single woman Simon speaks to is Frieda, a cigarette girl in a club he frequents, being in search of richer prey he breaks his promise. An attractive but suspiciously available young woman called Lucille scoops him up and, once they are married, reveals that she is the penniless niece of his butler, in whom he unwisely confided.

When Herbert finally gathers the nerve to go through with his assignment, he inadvertently foils an actual robbery and becomes a hero, plastered across the front pages of the press. He is rewarded with a branch managership. Susan, a fellow bank employee, is proud and happy to be his girl.

Then the executor gathers the four heirs together and informs them that there is in fact no money left. The whole exercise was Henry's last practical joke. Agnes, Deniston and Herbert burst into laughter. Simon is annoyed at first, until he looks out of the window at his conniving and equally unscrupulous wife, who is waiting for him with a bottle of champagne. Then he too joins in the merriment.

== Cast ==
- Alastair Sim as Deniston Russell
- Fay Compton as Agnes Russell
- Guy Middleton as Simon Russell
- George Cole as Herbert Russell
- Hugh Griffith as Henry Russell
- Ernest Thesiger as Endicott, Henry's executor
- Beatrice Campbell as Lucille Grayson
- Mackenzie Ward as Benson, Simon's butler
- Joyce Grenfell as Elizabeth Robson
- A. E. Matthews as Sir Charles Robson
- John Laurie as Gordon Webb
- Veronica Hurst as Joan Webb
- Anthony Steel as Roger Godfrey
- Eleanor Summerfield as Sheila Wilcott
- Charlotte Mitchell as Ethel, Agnes's maid
- Leslie Dwyer as Police station sergeant
- Colin Gordon as Police station constable
- Ronald Adam as Wagstaffe, the bank manager
- Michael Pertwee as Stewart, a bank employee
- Mary Germaine as Susan Heath
- Audrey Hepburn as Frieda, a cigarette girl
- Noel Howlett as Clerk of the Court
- Martin Boddey as store detective
- Arthur Howard as passenger in train with Herbert (uncredited)

Eleanor Summerfield and Noel Howlett both appeared, although in different roles, in the 1970 remake Some Will, Some Won't.

== Production ==
This was Hepburn's first professional appearance on film (save for a brief role in a 1948 Dutch film entitled Dutch in Seven Lessons and a bit part in 1951's One Wild Oat), with her two scenes as a cigarette girl totalling 43 seconds. They were recreated by Jennifer Love Hewitt in the 2000 biopic The Audrey Hepburn Story. Anthony Steel also has a small role. The film's editor Giulio Zampi would go on to produce the 1970 remake Some Will, Some Won't.

== Reception ==
=== Box office ===
Laughter in Paradise was the fourth most popular film at the British box-office in 1951.

=== Critical ===
The Monthly Film Bulletin wrote: "As a whole, although the script contains some genuinely amusing ideas, neither script writers nor director have achieved the pace, invention and style of high comedy. The flatness of the handling is particularly apparent in the two weakest episodes, which are only saved from banality by being cut into short scenes, thanks to the simultaneous narrative method. Many of the players are given opportunities only for conventional performances of the caricature type, such as Joyce Grenfell's schoolgirlish, overdone A.T.S. officer, Ronald Adam's pompous bank manager, and Leslie Dwyer's comic police sergeant. But the film owes most of its humour to two good performances: George Cole is restrained and amusing as the bank clerk; Alistair Sim is rich, outsize and comic as the writer."

The New York Times in November 1951 called the film a "merely pleasant, not especially surprising, comedy".

In modern reviews, the Radio Times, David Parkinson gave the film four out of five stars, and praised the "fantastic performance of Alastair Sim as the henpecked thriller writer", adding, "the scene in which he tries to shoplift is one of the funniest in a career overladen with choice comic moments."

Britmovie called the film "a sure-fire British comedy that's sprightly execution doesn’t leave many dull moments."
