= Foreign Exchange (1970 film) =

- Written by: Jimmy Sangster
- Directed by: Roy Ward Baker
- Starring: Robert Horton; Jill St. John; Sebastian Cabot
- Music by: Johnny Pearson
- Country of origin: United States
- Original language: English

Production
- Executive producer: Harold D. Cohen
- Producer: Jimmy Sangster
- Cinematography: Arthur Grant
- Editor: Spencer Reeve
- Running time: 75 minutes
- Production companies: American Broadcasting Company; Halsan Productions

Original release
- Release: January 13, 1970

Foreign Exchange is a 1970 American action thriller drama spy television film originally aired on ABC and directed by Roy Ward Baker. Its teleplay, written by Jimmy Sangster, was based on his own 1968 novel of the same name. The film starred Robert Horton, Jill St. John, and Sebastian Cabot. It is a sequel to the television film The Spy Killer, which was released the previous year.

== Plot ==
When a Russian agent is arrested in London, former spy turned private eye John Smith is contacted by British Intelligence boss Max and asked to participate in a secret operation behind the Iron Curtain. When Smith refuses, his American girlfriend Mary is threatened with immediate deportation. Smith reluctantly complies, only to find himself back in the world of espionage in an exchange plot designed to undermine the Russian Secret Service.

== Cast ==
- Robert Horton as John Smith
- Sebastian Cabot as Max
- Jill St. John as Mary Harper
- Dudley Foster as Leo
- Clive Graham as Johns
- George Roubicek as Karkov
- Eric Pohlmann as Borensko
- Eric Longworth as Boreman
- Eleanor Summerfield as Mrs. Roberts
