= The Spy Killer =

- American VHS cover
- Based on: private i by Jimmy Sangster
- Written by: Jimmy Sangster
- Directed by: Roy Ward Baker
- Starring: Robert Horton; Sebastian Cabot; Jill St. John
- Music by: Johnny Pearson
- Country of origin: United States
- Original language: English

Production
- Producers: Jimmy Sangster; Harold D. Cohen
- Cinematography: Arthur Grant
- Editor: Spencer Reeve
- Running time: 74 minutes
- Production companies: American Broadcasting Company; Halsan Productions

Original release
- Network: ABC
- Release: November 11, 1969

The Spy Killer is a 1969 American action thriller drama spy television film originally aired on ABC and directed by Roy Ward Baker. Its teleplay, written by Jimmy Sangster, was based on his own 1967 novel private i. The film starred Robert Horton, Sebastian Cabot, and Jill St. John. In the following year, a sequel titled Foreign Exchange was released with the same main cast and crew.

Both novels were reprinted by Brash Books in September 2019 in ebook, paperback and audio editions.

== Plot ==
Former spy turned private eye John Smith (Robert Horton) is wrongly arrested for the murder of his ex-wife's new husband. Smith then finds himself acquitted for the crime by his former intelligence boss (Sebastian Cabot), but in return for a notebook from his time as a spy. This book lists the names of Western agents operating covertly in Red China, and as Smith discovers, others are also chasing the book.

== Cast ==
- Robert Horton: John Smith
- Jill St. John: Mary Harper
- Sebastian Cabot: Max
- Lee Montague: Igor
- Eleanor Summerfield: Mrs. Roberts
- Barbara Shelley: Danielle
- Kenneth J. Warren: Diaman
