= Walter Stone (screenwriter) =

American screenwriter (1920–1999)

- Born: Walter Thomas Stone Jr. February 1, 1920; Dunellen, New Jersey, U.S.
- Died: October 20, 1999 (aged 79); Miami Beach, Florida, U.S.
- Occupation: Screenwriter

Walter Thomas Stone Jr. (February 1, 1920 – October 20, 1999) was an American screenwriter best known for his work as the head writer for The Honeymooners.

Born in Dunellen, New Jersey, he served with the United States Army Air Forces during World War II. His earliest work was on a radio show for Robert Q. Lewis, a job he got after sending in some comedy material he had written after reading an article that said that the network was looking for writers. He later wrote for the radio game show Stop the Music.

Stone connected with a then-little-known Jackie Gleason and became a writer for his comedic shtick. Together with Marvin Marx, he was the lead screenwriter for Gleason of the 39 episodes of the television sitcom The Honeymooners, which were originally aired from 1955 to 1956, and have since been re-broadcast in syndication in the decades since. The episodes were among more than 100 episodes and specials that Stone wrote for Gleason. He later wrote for the television series That's Life, starring Robert Morse and E. J. Peaker.

A resident of Bay Harbor Islands, Florida, Stone died at the age of 79 on October 20, 1999, in nearby Miami Beach.
