= Ask Any Girl =

Ask Any Girl may refer to:

- Ask Any Girl (film), a 1959 film starring Shirley MacLaine
- "Ask Any Girl", a song by The Supremes
