= Dawson Independent School District =

Dawson Independent School District may refer to:

- Dawson Independent School District (Dawson County, Texas)
- Dawson Independent School District (Navarro County, Texas)
