= Anjanette Comer =

American actress (1939–2026)

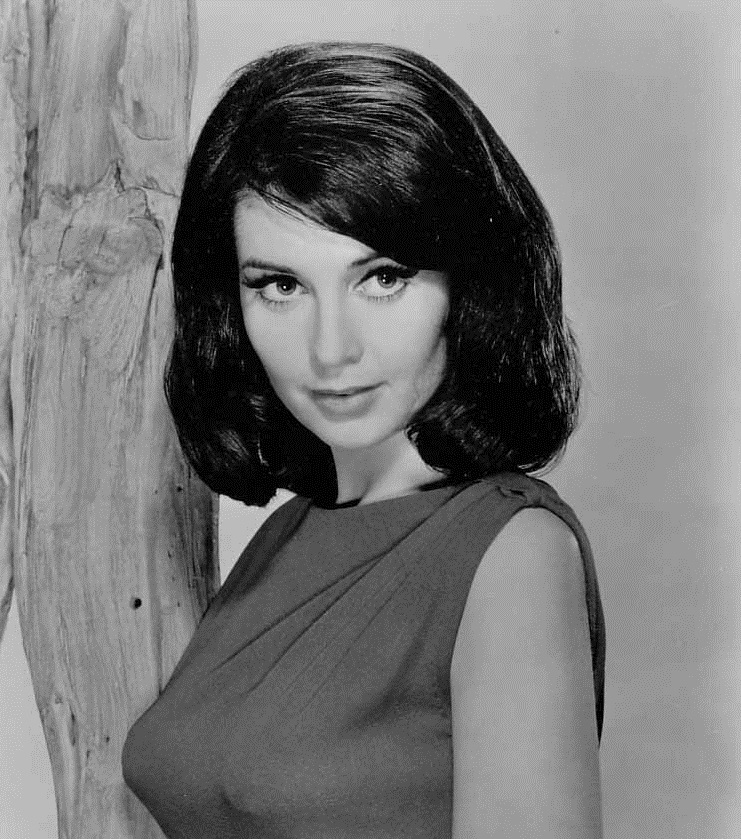
- Comer in 1965
- Born: August 7, 1939; Dawson, Texas, U.S.
- Died: May 28, 2026 (aged 86); Santa Monica, California, U.S.
- Occupation: Actress
- Years active: 1962–2011
- Spouse: Robert Klane (m. 1976; div. 1983)

Anjanette Comer (August 7, 1939 – May 28, 2026) was an American actress known for her leading roles in The Appaloosa, Guns for San Sebastian and Lepke.

== Early years ==
Anjanette Comer was born in Dawson, Texas on August 7, 1939, to Rufus Franklin Comer, Jr. and Nola Dell "Sue" (Perkins) Comer. She attended Dawson High School. Comer gained acting experience at the Pasadena Playhouse.

== Career ==
Comer's first major television credit was a guest appearance in a 1962 episode of My Three Sons titled "Heat Wave", followed by roles in several other dramatic series of the 1960s, such as Dr. Kildare and Bonanza. In 1964, she earned an Emmy nomination for Outstanding Performance in a Supporting Role by an Actress for her work on an episode on Arrest and Trial.

She made her film debut as the female lead in the 1964 comedy Quick, Before It Melts, followed by a memorable role in the 1965 satire The Loved One, playing a seductive mortician who offers Robert Morse a choice for his uncle's funeral arrangements of "Inhumement, entombment, inurnment, immurement? Some people just lately have preferred ensarcophagusment."

Although Comer was cast opposite Michael Caine for Funeral in Berlin and appeared in publicity stills (she can be seen with Caine and Eva Renzi in a photograph on the DVD release), she had to be replaced because of illness. She had another leading role as a love interest of Marlon Brando and John Saxon in The Appaloosa (1966). The film, shot on location in Mexico, presented Anjanette as a Mexican peasant girl, a role she repeated in Guns for San Sebastian (1968). In between, she starred in Banning.

Comer's film activity dropped off in 1970 after she played Ruth in the film version of John Updike's Rabbit, Run (1970). She later claimed she let her love life interfere with her work. Comer's later films include The Firechasers (1971) and Fire Sale (1977), and the TV movie The Long Summer of George Adams (1983).

== Personal life and death ==
In the early 1960s, she was married to Walter Koenig (Ensign Chekov from Star Trek), but the union did not last.

From 1976 to 1983, Comer was married to Robert Klane; the marriage ended in divorce.

Comer died on May 28, 2026, at the age of 86 at the UCLA Santa Monica Medical Center. She had leukemia and heart issues at the time of her death.

== Filmography ==
=== Film ===
| Year | Title | Role | Notes |
|---|---|---|---|
| 1964 | Quick, Before It Melts | Tiara Marshall | |
| 1965 | The Loved One | Aimee Thanatogenous | |
| 1966 | The Appaloosa | Trini Medena | |
| 1967 | Banning | Carol Lindquist | |
| 1968 | La Bataille de San Sebastian | Kinita | English Title: Guns for San Sebastian |
| 1968 | In Enemy Country | Denise | |
| 1970 | Rabbit, Run | Ruth Leonard | |
| 1971 | The Firechasers | Toby Collins | |
| 1972 | Blood Feast | Cathy | |
| 1973 | The Baby | Ann Gentry | |
| 1975 | Lepke | Bernice Meyer | |
| 1975 | The Manchu Eagle Murder Caper Mystery | Arlevia Jessup | |
| 1977 | Fire Sale | Marion Fikus | |
| 1992 | Netherworld | Mrs. Palmer | |
| 1995 | The Underneath | Mrs. Chambers | |
| 2003 | Screen Door Jesus | Verna Lynn Cunningham | |
| 2011 | A Bird of the Air | Mrs. Weber | |

=== Television ===
| Year | Title | Role | Notes |
|---|---|---|---|
| 1962 | My Three Sons | Janie Stempel | Season 3 Episode 11: ”Heat Wave” |
| 1962 | The Donna Reed Show | Barbie | Season 5 Episode 13: "The Winning Ticket" |
| 1963 | Gunsmoke | Cara Miles | Season 9 Episode 8: "Carter Caper" |
| 1963 | Ben Casey | June | Season 3 Episode 13: "My Love, My Love" |
| 1963 | Arrest and Trial | Annabelle Selinsky | Season 1 Episode 12: "Journey into Darkness" |
| 1964 | Dr. Kildare | Carol Montgomery | 2 episodes |
| 1964 | Bonanza | Joan Wingate | Season 5 Episode 22: "Love Me Not" |
| 1964 | Combat! | Annette | Season 2 Episode 27: "Weep No More" |
| 1969 | The Young Lawyers | Bonnie Baron | Season 1 Episode 0: "The Young Lawyers" |
| 1969–1971 | Love, American Style | Billie Joe Hollister / Audrey Woods / Chris | 3 episodes |
| 1970 | Then Came Bronson | Vhea Samos | Season 1 Episode 26: "What's an Ark Without Centaurs?" |
| 1970 | The Mod Squad | Billie | Season 3 Episode 1: "The Long Road Home" |
| 1971 | The Most Deadly Game | Gretchen | Season 1 Episode 10: "The Classic Burial Position" |
| 1971 | Banyon | Diane Jennings | Season 1 Episode 0: "Pilot" |
| 1971 | Five Desperate Women | Lucy | TV Movie |
| 1971 | The Deadly Hunt | Martha | TV Movie |
| 1972 | Columbo | Jenifer Welles | Season 2 Episode 1: "Étude in Black" |
| 1972 | Mannix | Gina Hunter/Margo Moore | Season 6 Episode 4: "Broken Mirror" |
| 1972–1973 | Doctor Simon Locke | Andi / Norma Carlin | 2 episodes |
| 1973 | Search | Anne Ramon | Season 1 Episode 18: "Goddess of Destruction" |
| 1974 | Police Story | Constantina | 2 episodes |
| 1974 | The Wide World of Mystery | Danna Forester | Season 2 Episode 8: "Shadow of Fear" |
| 1974 | The Wide World of Mystery | Danna Forester | TV Movie |
| 1974 | Night Games | Jenny Kenedisis | TV Movie |
| 1974 | Terror on the 40th Floor | Darlene Porter | TV Movie |
| 1975 | Death Stalk | Pat Trahey | TV Movie |
| 1975 | Petrocelli | Mary Thorpe | Season 1 Episode 17: "A Lonely Victim" |
| 1975 | Harry O | Grace Duvall | Season 2 Episode 4: "Shades" |
| 1975 | S.W.A.T. | Alicia Woodward | Season 2 Episode 11: "Strike Force" |
| 1975 | Barbary Coast | Mary Louise | Season 1 Episode 11: "The Day Cable Was Hanged" |
| 1975 | The Blue Knight | Reba | Season 1 Episode 3: "Odds Against Tomorrow" |
| 1976 | Jigsaw John | Mavis Bellamy | Season 1 Episode 1: "Promise to Kill" |
| 1976 | McNaughton's Daughter | Andrea Farelli | Miniseries (Episode 1: "Love Is a Four-Letter Word") |
| 1976 | Baretta | Det. Ann Harley | Season 3 Episode 8: "Dear Tony" |
| 1977 | Dead of Night | Alexis | TV Movie |
| 1980 | Barnaby Jones | Vivian Harper | Season 8 Episode 20: "The Silent Accuser" |
| 1982 | The Long Summer of George Adams | Venida | TV Movie |
| 1986 | Mike Hammer | Toni Cordell | Season 3 Episode 4: "Mike's Baby" |
| 1988 | Hotel | Maggie | Season 5 Episode 12: "Double Take" |
| 1991 | Jake and the Fatman | Wanda Lee / Vera Lake | 3 episodes |
| 1992 | Perry Mason: The Case of the Reckless Romeo | Nora Turner | TV Movie |
| 1995 | Streets of Laredo | Beulah | Miniseries (2 episodes) |
| 1995 | Deadly Family Secrets | Hilda Potter | TV Movie |
| 1999 | Profiler | Barbara Henkley | Season 3 Episode 15: "Spree of Love" |
| 1999 | The Practice | Sister Christine | Season 3 Episode 19: "Closet Justice" |
| 2002 | The Pennsylvania Miners' Story | Sue Unger | TV Movie |
