= Joe Lockridge =

American politician from Texas (1932–1968)

Member of the Texas House of Representatives from District 33
- In office 1966 – May 3, 1968

Personal details
- Born: July 15, 1932 Waco, Texas, United States
- Died: May 3, 1968 (aged 35) Dawson, Texas, US
- Party: Democratic
- Spouse: Eva Lockridge
- Education: Southern University

Joseph Edwin Lockridge (July 15, 1932 – May 3, 1968) was one of the first African Americans to serve in the Texas House of Representatives since Reconstruction, representing the 33rd District in Dallas County. He was elected alongside State Senator Barbara Jordan and state representative Curtis Graves.

== Early life ==
Lockridge was born to Reverend Leroy R. Lockridge and Demover (Gregory) Lockridge on July 15, 1932, in Waco, Texas. He received a bachelor's degree from Southern University, in Baton Rouge, and a Juris Doctor from Howard University in Washington, D.C. He was in the United States Army during the Korean War. In 1960, he was admitted to the Texas State Bar. He worked in private legal practice until 1966, when he was elected to the Texas State House.

== Legislative career ==
Lockridge was a member of the 60th Texan legislature. He received committee assignments to the Education, House State Affairs, Federal Relations, Mental Retardation and Penitentiary committees. His legislative focus was on mental health. His primary legislative accomplishment was a law that created halfway houses to aid recovering mental health patients in re-integrating into communities. By resolution, his colleague's in the legislature named him "Rookie [Freshman] of the Year". His service in the legislature was abruptly cut short when he died in the crash of Braniff Flight 352.

== Death and legacy ==
Lockridge died on May 3, 1968, when Braniff International Airways Flight 352 broke up in the air. He was returning to Dallas from an event at Prairie View A&M College (now Prairie View A&M University). There were calls for his wife, Eva Lockridge, to replace him, but she declined. A special election was held June 18, 1968. Lockridge was succeeded by Zan Wesley Holmes Jr.

After his death, he was honored by members of the Golden Gate Missionary Baptist Church through the creation of the Golden Gate Joseph E. Lockridge Scholarship Foundation. The first scholarships were given in 1970. As of 2012, there have been 190 Lockridge Scholars. Recipients are selected from high school graduating classes in or near Dallas County. The foundation restricts its scholarships to Christian applicants who are US citizens, and selects based on academic performance.
