= Purdon, Texas =

Unincorporated community in Navarro County, Texas

Purdon is an unincorporated community in Navarro County, Texas, United States. According to the Handbook of Texas, the community had an estimated population of 133 in 2000.

== Geography ==
Purdon is located at 31°56′57″N 96°37′00″W (31.9490462, −96.6166545), along FM 55, three miles south of State Highway 31 in south central Navarro County. Purdon is situated roughly 14 miles southwest of Corsicana.

== History ==
Historical population
Census	Pop.	Note	%±
1920	346		—
1930	308		−11.0%
1940	262		−14.9%
1950	203		−22.5%
1960	151		−25.6%
1970	133		−11.9%

The earliest named settlement near what later became Purdon was a community called Belle Point. It was originally settled by Captain J. A. Harrison. In the early 1880s, the St. Louis Southwestern Railway (also known as the "Cotton Belt") was built two miles south of Belle Point and lots were soon platted around the rail stop. The new community was named Purdon. Credit for the name is given to a railroad man named Harris, who was attracted to a cashier where he brought supplies – Miss Ada Purdom. By an inadvertent spelling mistake at the general office, the town became Purdon. A post office was established in 1881. Purdon became a thriving community with most of the blackland in the area used to raise cotton, corn, and other feed grains. By 1896, around 80 people lived in the community. In 1912, a new two-story brick school was completed. According to 1920 Census figures, Purdon had a population of 346. With the coming of school buses in 1928, Belle Point, Jester, and Silver City schools were consolidated with Purdon. The population began to steadily decline, falling to 308 in 1930, and to 262 by 1940. The decline accelerated after World War II, when many residents left the area in search of job opportunities in larger cities. Purdon's school was consolidated with nearby Dawson in the fall of 1959. As of 1960, Purdon recorded 151 inhabitants, less than half of the population at its peak in 1920. During the remainder of the 20th century, the population hovered around 133. Today, most residents travel to either Corsicana or Dawson for groceries, banking, doctors, and employment.

On October 14, 2014, the "news" site National Report reported that a family of five had contracted the Ebola virus. This was quickly distributed through social media as fact.

Although Purdon is unincorporated, it has a post office, with the ZIP code of 76679.

== Education ==
Public education in the community of Purdon is provided by the Dawson Independent School District.
