= Weldon Betts =

American politician

Member of the Texas House of Representatives from the 140th district
- In office January 13, 1987 – April 6, 1989
- Preceded by: Eugene R. Haney
- Succeeded by: Charles Hartland

Personal details
- Born: September 11, 1922 Dawson, Texas
- Died: April 6, 1989 (aged 66) Houston, Texas
- Party: Democratic

Weldon Betts (September 11, 1922 – April 6, 1989) was an American politician who served in the Texas House of Representatives from the 140th district from 1987 until his death in 1989.

He died of cancer on April 6, 1989, in Houston, Texas at age 66.
