= Dawson Independent School District (Navarro County, Texas) =

School district in Texas

Dawson ISD - Dawson, TX

Address
- 199 N School Ave. Central Texas Dawson, Navarro, Texas, 76639; United States
- Coordinates: 31.897604°N 96.711611°W

District information
- Type: Public
- Motto: "Learners Today, Leaders Tomorrow"
- Grades: PK-12
- Established: 1928; 98 years ago
- Superintendent: Andrea Farish (2025-Present), Stacy Henderson (2012-2025)
- NCES District ID: 4816380
- District ID: 175-904

Students and staff
- Enrollment: 625 (2025-2026)
- Staff: 107.00 (on an FTE basis)
- Athletic conference: UIL Class 2A
- District mascot: Bulldogs
- Colors: Black, Gold, and White

Other information
- Website: www.dawsonisd.net

Dawson Independent School District is a public school district based in Dawson, Texas (USA). Dawson ISD serves southwestern Navarro County, including the unincorporated community of Purdon. An extremely small portion of the district extends into neighboring Hill County.

Dawson ISD has one school with two campuses - Dawson Junior/Senior High School and Dawson Elementary School, both in Dawson.

The district is administered by a superintendent and administrative staff located in the central administration offices. Policy decisions and administrative suggestions are made by the Board of Trustees, who are elected by the community.

== Quick Facts ==
The district has:

- 625 students
- 50 teachers
- 1 elementary
- 1 junior high school
- 1 high school

Approximately 12 Students to every 1 Teacher.

== Sports and Activities ==
Dawson ISD excels in numerous activities. Sports that Dawson HS and JH participate in are Girls Volleyball (V, JV, JH), Football (V, JH), Cross Country (HS and JH), Basketball (B and G V, JV, and JH), Baseball (Varsity), Softball (Varsity), Powerlifting (HS), Tennis (HS, V), and Track (HS and JH). Extra-curricular activities include Band (HS and JH), Cheerleading (HS and JH), Yearbook (HS), FFA (HS), One Act Play (HS and JH), and National Honor Society (JH and HS).

Key -

- V - Varsity
- JV - Junior Varsity
- JH - Junior High
- HS - High School
- B - Boys
- G - Girls

== Contact information ==
Dawson ISD is located at 199 North School Ave. in Dawson, Texas 76639. The phone number for the District is 254.578.1031.
