= Tru (play) =

1989 play by Jay Presson Allen

- Original language: English
- Written by: Jay Presson Allen
- Characters: Truman Capote
- Setting: New York City; December 1975

Premiere
- Date: December 14, 1989
- Place: Booth Theatre

Tru is a 1989 play by Jay Presson Allen, adapted from the words and works of Truman Capote.

== Background ==
Adapted from the words and works of Truman Capote, Tru is set in the writer's New York City apartment at 870 United Nations Plaza the week before Christmas 1975. An excerpt from Capote's infamous unfinished roman à clef, Answered Prayers, recently had been published in Esquire. Having recognized thinly veiled versions of themselves, Manhattan socialites such as Babe Paley and Slim Keith turn their backs on the man they once considered a close confidant. Alone and lonely, Capote — soothing himself with pills, vodka, cocaine, and chocolate truffles — muses about his checkered life and career in what is essentially a two-act monodrama.

== Production ==
After 11 previews, the Broadway production of Tru, directed by Allen, opened on December 14, 1989 at the Booth Theatre, where it ran for 297 performances. Robert Morse starred as Truman Capote. Before Morse was cast as Capote, Tim Curry was offered and declined the role, and Paul Williams dropped out shortly before production began. Lighting design by Ken Billington.

In his review in The New York Times, Frank Rich said, "Intentionally or not, Tru is a creep show: a hybrid of necrophilia and tame fan-magazine journalism that doesn't so much rekindle fascination with a troubled writer as reawaken the willies prompted by those disoriented talk-show appearances … that were the desperate final act of his career.

"In place of a life portrait with depth, Tru settles for its wind-up Mme. Tussaud's caricature of the wrecked 1975 model Capote. This Tru is sporadically funny — if one shares Mrs. Allen's taste for the campiest of anecdotes and one-liners — and rarely boring. But since the soul of the younger Capote doesn't shine through as Mr. Morse's youthful spirit does, the potentially touching drama of decay is lost. The complex, possibly tragic figure of a wasted artist is replaced by a maudlin, some might say antediluvian, stereotype of Boys in the Band vintage."

In 1992, Morse recreated his performance for the PBS series American Playhouse.

Morse also directed a production of the play in Toronto in 1996, starring Canadian actor Louis Negin.

In February 2026, Jesse Tyler Ferguson starred as Capote in a revival of the play in the Off-Broadway limited run production at an Upper East Side mansion. Directed by Rob Ashford, Fergussen was joined by Tony nominee actress, Charlotte d'Amboise, in an immersive performance that took place in the Library of the House of the Redeemer. Ferguson received a 2026 Drama League Distinguished Performance nomination for his performance. This immersive performance production also transferred to the UK, playing between September 19 and November 14, 2026 at Off West End theatre the Menier Chocolate Factory, where Jesse Tyler Ferguson was joined by Nathalie Harrison as The Swan.

== Accolades ==
Robert Morse won the Tony Award for Best Performance by a Leading Actor in a Play and the Drama Desk Award for Outstanding One-Person Show.

For his performance in the 1992 American Playhouse presentation of Tru, Morse won the Emmy Award for Outstanding Lead Actor in a Miniseries or a Movie.
