= The Loved One (1965 film) =

1965 black-and-white satirical comedy film

- Theatrical release poster
- Directed by: Tony Richardson
- Screenplay by: Terry Southern; Christopher Isherwood
- Based on: The Loved One by Evelyn Waugh
- Produced by: John Calley; Haskell Wexler
- Starring: Robert Morse; Jonathan Winters; Anjanette Comer; Rod Steiger
- Cinematography: Haskell Wexler
- Edited by: Hal Ashby; Brian Smedley-Aston; Antony Gibbs (supervising)
- Music by: John Addison
- Production company: Filmways
- Distributed by: Metro-Goldwyn-Mayer
- Release date: October 11, 1965
- Running time: 122 minutes
- Country: United States
- Language: English
- Budget: £860,000
- Box office: $2 million (est. US/Canada rentals)

The Loved One is a 1965 black-and-white black comedy film directed by British filmmaker Tony Richardson. A satirical look at the funeral business in Los Angeles, it is based on Evelyn Waugh's 1948 short novel The Loved One: An Anglo-American Tragedy, though the screenplay by noted American satirical novelist Terry Southern and British author Christopher Isherwood also incorporates elements from Jessica Mitford's 1963 nonfiction book The American Way of Death. The film stars Robert Morse, Jonathan Winters, Anjanette Comer, and Rod Steiger, with Dana Andrews, Milton Berle, James Coburn, John Gielgud, Tab Hunter, Margaret Leighton, Liberace, Roddy McDowall, Robert Morley, Barbara Nichols, and Lionel Stander credited as "cameo guest stars", and features the debut acting performance of songwriter Paul Williams.

== Plot ==
Young Englishman—and aspiring poet—Dennis Barlow wins an airline ticket and decides to visit his uncle, Sir Francis Hinsley, in Los Angeles. Shortly after Dennis's arrival, Sir Francis, who has worked at a major Hollywood studio for more than thirty years, is fired by his employer, D.J. Jr., and hangs himself.

Sir Ambrose Abercrombie, a prominent English expatriate, convinces Dennis to spend most of the money from his uncle's estate on an extravagant burial at Whispering Glades cemetery and mortuary. There, Dennis becomes infatuated with Aimee Thanatogenos, a hopelessly naïve and idealistic cosmetician who says she was named after Aimee Semple McPherson. Mr. Joyboy, Whispering Glade's chief embalmer, is also attracted to her, but, although she respects him professionally, Aimee has no romantic feelings for Joyboy. Aimee's idol is the seemingly solemn and pious owner of Whispering Glades, Reverend Wilbur Glenworthy, unaware that, in private, he is a calculating businessman who regards the cemetery as just a business venture.

Dennis begins working at Happier Hunting Grounds, a pet cemetery run by the Reverend's twin brother, Harry. He discovers Aimee is fascinated by—but unfamiliar with—poetry, and courts her by reciting famous verses, changing the subject when she asks whether he wrote them. As he knows Aimee considers the pet cemetery sacrilegious, he also does not tell her where he works.

Aimee is frustrated by Dennis' cynical and disrespectful attitude toward Whispering Glades, and, when she gets a promotion, she is shocked by his suggestion that they marry and live on her income. Acting on advice from the "Guru Brahmin", who is actually a drunken newspaper staff writer, she accepts a dinner invitation from Joyboy, but any thoughts of a relationship with him end when she observes his codependent relationship with his morbidly obese mother.

Again, after taking advice from the Guru, Aimee becomes engaged with Dennis. She invites him to her house, which was condemned before being completed due to the risk of landslides, but he cuts his visit short, alarmed by some ominous tremblings and Aimee's lack of concern for her safety.

Dennis and Harry meet Gunther Fry, a boy genius with an interest in rocketry, and let him set up shop at the pet cemetery. Joyboy brings in his mother's pet myna bird to be buried, but agrees to have the bird shot into orbit on one of Gunther's rockets, instead. Having discovered that Dennis is his rival for Aimee's affections, Joyboy brings Aimee to the ceremony, and she is outraged when she sees Dennis performing the service.

Reverend Glenworthy, seeing little profit in Whispering Glades once all of the plots are filled, decides to convert it into a retirement community, but cannot proceed without a plan for dealing with the interred bodies. When he learns of Harry's idea of launching bodies into space, he proceeds to obtain surplus rockets by hosting an orgy at Whispering Glades with top Air Force brass as the guests of honor. Dennis, in a desperate attempt to reconcile with Aimee, tells her that Whispering Glades is to be shut down. She flees, but is afraid that what Dennis told her might be true.

Aimee seeks out Joyboy for comfort, but he has been called to touch-up the first disinterred body—an ex-astronaut nicknamed "The Condor"—before it is launched into orbit. She tracks down the Guru at a bar, but he drunkenly advises her to jump out a window. Fleeing to the cemetery, Aimee finds Reverend Glenworthy, who confirms Dennis' story and tries to seduce her by promising continued employment with higher pay at the new facility. Her faith in everything she once held sacred now shattered, Aimee calmly hooks herself up to an embalming machine.

Joyboy finds Aimee's body. Fearing a scandal, he calls Dennis to arrange for her disposal in the pet cemetery's crematorium. In exchange for a first-class ticket back to England and all the money in Joyboy's bank account, Dennis agrees. As he is about to leave Whispering Glades, Dennis decides to put Aimee's body in the casket that is to be placed in the rocket and cremate the Condor. After watching the launch on television, Dennis boards his plane.

== Cast ==
- Robert Morse as Dennis Barlow
- Jonathan Winters as "The Blessed" Reverend Wilbur Glenworthy / Harry Glenworthy
- Anjanette Comer as Aimee Thanatogenos
- Rod Steiger as Mr. Joyboy
- Dana Andrews as General Buck Brinkman
- Milton Berle as Mr. Kenton
- James Coburn as immigration officer at the airport
- John Gielgud as Sir Francis Hinsley
- Tab Hunter as Whispering Glades tour guide
- Margaret Leighton as Mrs. Helen Kenton
- Liberace as Mr. Starker, the Whispering Glades casket salesman
- Roddy McDowall as D.J. Jr.
- Robert Morley as Sir Ambrose Abercrombie
- Barbara Nichols as Sadie Blodgett
- Lionel Stander as "Hump", aka the Guru Brahmin
- Ayllene Gibbons as Joyboy's mother
- Bernie Kopell as assistant to the Guru Brahmin
- Asa Maynor as secretary to D.J. Jr.
- Alan Napier as English Club official
- Roxanne Arlen as a Whispering Glades hostess
- Pamela Curran as secretary to Wilbur Glenworthy
- Robert Easton as Dusty Acres
- Claire Kelly as the Whispering Glades hostess who helps Dennis plan Sir Francis' funeral
- Edwin Reimers as Whispering Glades minister
- Paul Williams as Gunther Fry
- Jamie Farr as waiter at the English club (uncredited)
- Joy Harmon as Miss Benson (uncredited)

== Pre-production ==
In 1947, Evelyn Waugh visited Hollywood when Metro-Goldwyn-Mayer offered him a six-figure sum for the film rights to his novel Brideshead Revisited, despite the fact that none of the studio bosses had read the book. The project was scrapped after Waugh demanded complete veto rights over the finished film, but, during his stay in Los Angeles, he became fascinated by the American obsession with the funeral industry and was inspired to write a lengthy journal article on Forest Lawn cemetery and its founder, Dr. Hubert Eaton, and then the 1948 novel The Loved One. In the following years, numerous people attempted unsuccessfully to produce a filmed version of Waugh's novel, including the Spanish surrealist filmmaker Luis Buñuel and the comic writer/director Elaine May.

== Production ==
The film was shot in and around Los Angeles, with Hollywood, the Hollywood Hills, Beverly Hills, Burbank, and Los Angeles International Airport among the locations. "Whispering Glades" was inspired by Forest Lawn Memorial Park in Glendale, with the exterior and interior scenes set at the facility shot mostly at Greystone Mansion. A house under construction at 3847 Oakfield Dr. in Sherman Oaks was used for Aimee's condemned house at the edge of a cliff.

== Reception ==
On the review aggregator website Rotten Tomatoes, 47% of 19 critics' reviews of the film are positive, with an average score of 6.3/10.

For his work in the film, Rod Steiger won the Spanish Sant Jordi Award for Best Actor in a Foreign Film.

== Home media ==
The Loved One was released on DVD on June 20, 2006. It was re-released by Warner Home Video on August 20, 2013, via their Warner Archive DVD-on-demand service. The film received a Blu-ray release in May 2017.

== Trivia ==
- The Fish Shanty restaurant was used as the entrance to a British club in the film.
