= Rabbit, Run (film) =

1970 film by Jack Smight

- Theatrical release poster
- Directed by: Jack Smight
- Screenplay by: Howard B. Kreitsek
- Based on: Rabbit, Run by John Updike
- Produced by: Howard B. Kreitsek
- Starring: James Caan; Carrie Snodgress; Anjanette Comer; Jack Albertson; Arthur Hill; Melodie Johnson; Henry Jones; Josephine Hutchinson
- Cinematography: Philip H. Lathrop
- Edited by: Archie Marshek
- Music by: Ray Burton; Brian King
- Distributed by: Warner Bros.
- Release date: October 20, 1970
- Running time: 94 minutes
- Country: United States
- Language: English

Rabbit, Run is a 1970 American independent drama film directed by Jack Smight and written and produced by Howard B. Kreitsek, based on John Updike's 1960 novel. It stars James Caan as Rabbit Angstrom, Carrie Snodgress as Rabbit's wife Janice, and Anjanette Comer as his girlfriend Ruth. It co-stars Jack Albertson as Coach Marty Tothero, Arthur Hill as Rev. Jack Eccles, and Henry Jones and Josephine Hutchinson as Rabbit's parents.

== Plot ==
In Reading, Pennsylvania, former high school basketball star Harry "Rabbit" Angstrom is dissatisfied with both his failure to find a career and with his loveless marriage to Janice, an alcoholic who is pregnant with a child neither of them wants. Following an argument with Janice, Rabbit looks up his old basketball coach Marty Tothero, who is now living in squalor. Marty decides that Rabbit needs a woman, and he introduces him to Ruth, a part-time prostitute. When Rabbit moves in with Ruth, Jack Eccles, the family minister, tries to persuade him to return to his wife, but Rabbit refuses.

Eventually, Rabbit also becomes disenchanted with Ruth, and when Janice has her baby, Rabbit goes to the hospital and effects a reconciliation. For a time, they live in relative harmony, but Janice's insistence on a less active sex life leads to bitterness, and Rabbit again takes off. Janice resumes her solitary drinking, this time with tragic results; while in a drunken stupor, she accidentally drowns the baby. Learning of his child's death, Rabbit returns home and finds that everyone holds him responsible.

At the funeral, Rabbit responds to his parents' and in-laws' accusing glances by screaming his innocence. Fleeing from the cemetery, he goes to Ruth's apartment; but Ruth, who is now pregnant with his child, refuses to let him in unless he agrees to divorce Janice and marry her. Although he promises to do so, Rabbit is still unable to make a commitment to anyone and runs away again.

== Cast ==
- James Caan as Harry "Rabbit" Angstrom
- Carrie Snodgress as Janice Angstrom
- Anjanette Comer as Ruth Leonard Byer
- Jack Albertson as Marty Tothero
- Arthur Hill as Rev. Jack Eccles
- Melodie Johnson as Lucy Eccles
- Henry Jones as Mr. Angstrom
- Josephine Hutchinson as Mrs. Angstrom
- Don Keefer as Mr. Springer
- Carmen Matthews as Mrs. Springer
- Nydia Westman as Mrs. Smith
- Marc Antony Van der Nagel as Nelson Angstrom
- Virginia Vincent as Margaret
- Sandra Scott as Miriam Angstrom
- Margot Stevenson as Mrs. Tothero
- Ken Kercheval as Barney

== Production ==
James Caan later said he did this film instead of M*A*S*H, adding, "I was at odds — not screaming or fighting — with this guy, writer Howard Kreitsek... Some of the dialogue was horrendous. And I said, "I can't say this!" And they would say, "Well, John Updike wrote it!" So I said, "Well then get fuckin' Updike to play it!" It was just not good. The director [Jack Smight] was not good." It was the last in a series of financially unsuccessful films where Caan played the lead.

Following a dispute over the cut of the film submitted by producer Howard B. Kreitsek, director Smight asked Warner Bros. and the Directors Guild of America for his name to be removed from the film.

== Release ==
The film, which was released by Warner Bros., had its world premiere in Updike's hometown of Reading, Pennsylvania, on 28 October 1970. The film poster reads, "3 months ago Rabbit Angstrom ran out to buy his wife cigarettes. He hasn't come home yet."

The reception by the Reading audience was poor and Warner Bros. aborted a wide release for the film, which didn't even play in New York City. As late as 1973, John Updike was still hoping that Warners would reshoot scenes he considered weak and re-release the film.

NBC aired the film on NBC Monday Night at the Movies in January 1974.

== Sources ==
- Rabbit, Run at IMDb
- Rabbit, Run at the TCM Movie Database (archived)
