= The Firechasers =

1971 film by Sidney Hayers

- British quad poster by Brian Bysouth
- Directed by: Sidney Hayers
- Written by: Philip Levene
- Produced by: Julian Wintle
- Starring: Chad Everett; Anjanette Comer
- Cinematography: Alan Hume
- Edited by: Lionel Selwyn
- Music by: Laurie Johnson
- Production company: ITC
- Distributed by: Rank Film Distributors (UK)
- Release date: 3 June 1971 (UK)
- Running time: 101 minutes
- Country: United Kingdom
- Language: English

The Firechasers (also known as Cause for Alarm) is a 1971 British crime film directed by Sidney Hayers and starring Chad Everett, Anjanette Comer, and Keith Barron. It was written by Philip Levene.

An insurance investigator tries to find out who is behind a series of arson attacks.

The character Quentin Barnaby also appeared, played by Robert Beatty, in the BBC radio series Destination – Fire! (1962–1966) written by Levene.

== Plot ==
While investigating the cause of a series of lethal fires in London, U.S. insurance man Quentin Barnaby falls in love with beautiful journalist Toby Collins. Working alongside and pooling information with Collins and her photographer, Jim Maxwell, Barnaby hopes they share a common goal, that of "firechasing" the identity of the arsonist responsible.

== Cast ==
- Chad Everett as Quentin Barnaby
- Anjanette Comer as Toby Collins
- Keith Barron as Jim Maxwell
- Joanne Dainton as Valerie Chrane
- Rupert Davies as Prentice
- James Hayter as Inspector Herman
- Robert Flemyng as Carlton
- Roy Kinnear as Roscoe
- Allan Cuthbertson as D.O Jarvis
- John Loder as Routledge

== Production ==
The film was shot at Pinewood Studios.

== Reception ==
The Monthly Film Bulletin wrote: "A straightforward thriller, presumably made with the American TV market in mind. (Its director, Sidney Hayers, made several episodes of The Human Jungle and The Avengers for ABC.) The emphasis is on action and the photogenic qualities of the fires; but while these are mounted with due dramatic flair, the performances are generally wooden, though Keith Barron does manage to invest an unlikely role with some bite. But the only time The Firechasers really rises above its romanticised world of highpowered journalists and insurance detectives is in the presentation of the mechanics of fire fighting, especially in the climactic fire in a large department store, with the heroine trapped in a lift between floors, fire above and below, and water spraying in on her from the ceiling sprinklers."

Kine Weekly wrote: "Straightforward who-dunnit, this has some exciting fire scenes and a tense climax. ... The mystery of who is responsible for the outbreaks is reasonably well kept amidst the usual crop of red herrings and, since this is primarily an action story, it does not matter so much that the characters are superficial."

TV Guide gave the film 1/5 stars, calling it "so-so entertainment."

In the Radio Times Tony Sloman wrote, "Director Sidney Hayers keeps up the pace as unlikely insurance investigator Everett hunts an arsonist throughout a London peopled with well-known British character actors."
