= Braniff International Airways Flight 352 =

1968 aviation accident

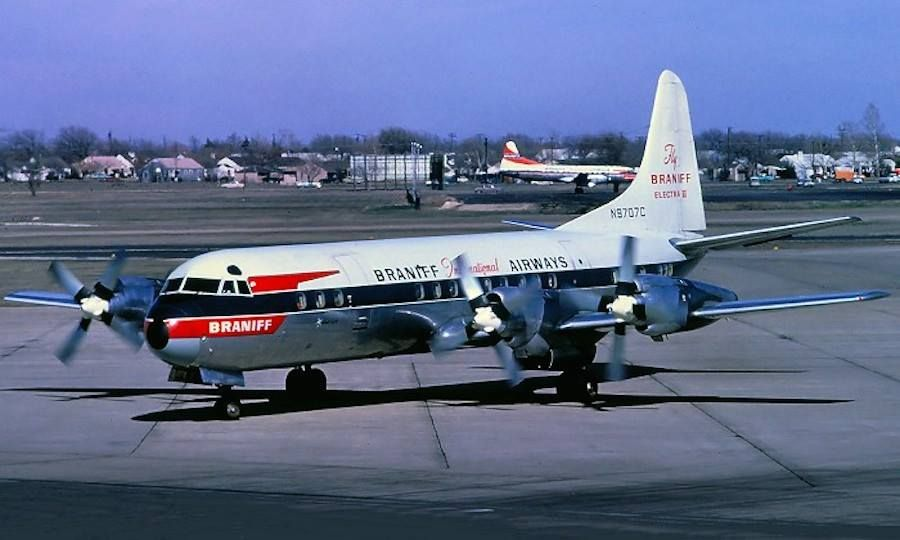
- N9707C, the aircraft involved in the accident, pictured in 1964

Accident
- Date: May 3, 1968
- Summary: Flight into thunderstorm leading to in-flight breakup
- Site: Navarro County, near Dawson, Texas, US; 31°53′55″N 96°41′50″W

Aircraft
- Aircraft type: Lockheed L-188A Electra
- Operator: Braniff International Airways
- Registration: N9707C
- Flight origin: William P. Hobby Airport
- Destination: Dallas Love Field
- Occupants: 85
- Passengers: 80
- Crew: 5
- Fatalities: 85
- Survivors: 0

Braniff International Airways Flight 352 was a scheduled domestic flight from William P. Hobby Airport in Houston, Texas, United States, to Dallas Love Field in Dallas. On May 3, 1968, a Lockheed L-188 Electra flying on the route, registration N9707C, disintegrated in midair and crashed near Dawson, Texas, after flying into a severe thunderstorm. It was carrying five crew and 80 passengers, all of whom were killed, including Texas state representative Joseph Lockridge. An investigation revealed the cause to be the captain's decision to penetrate an area of heavy weather and the crew's subsequent steep 180-degree turn to escape the conditions, which caused structural overstress and failure of the airframe.

== Flight history ==
Earlier in the day at 12:40, the crew of the accident flight (consisting of 45-year-old captain John R. Phillips, 32-year-old first officer John F. Foster and 28-year-old flight engineer Donald W. Crossland), flew from Dallas to Houston without experiencing significant weather conditions. No record of any crew briefing about the updated weather was made by representatives of the Weather Bureau, Federal Aviation Administration, or Braniff. The crew did receive papers, though, with weather reports and forecasts for the route and terminals.

At 16:11, the crew departed William P. Hobby Airport as Braniff Flight 352, a Lockheed L-188A Electra four-engined turboprop, en route to Dallas Love Field. About 25 minutes into the flight, while cruising at FL200 (about 20,000 feet (6,100 m) above mean sea level), the aircraft approached an area of severe thunderstorm activity. The crew requested to descend to 15,000 feet (4,570 m) and to deviate to the west. Air traffic control (ATC) informed the crew that other flights in the area were deviating to the east and suggested they do the same, but the Electra crew reported that the west seemed a better option on their onboard weather radar: "Three fifty two does it look good (better). On our scope here it looks like to the uh a little just a little bit to the west would do us real fine." ATC then cleared the flight to descend to 14,000 feet (4,270 m) and deviate to the west as they requested. The westerly deviation would have been shorter and quicker than an easterly one.

At 16:44, the crew requested, and ATC cleared, to descend to 5,000 feet (1,520 m). The crew asked ATC if hail in the area had been reported, but ATC replied: "No, you're the closest one that's ever come to it yet ... I haven't been able to, anybody to, well I haven't tried really to get anybody to go through it, they've all deviated around to the east."

At 16:47, the flight encountered an area of severe weather, including hail, and requested a 180° right turn, which ATC immediately approved. While turning to the right in severe turbulence, the plane's bank angle was increased to more than 90°, and the nose pitched down to about 40°. As the crew attempted to recover from the steep diving turn, the aircraft experienced acceleration forces of greater than 4 g, which caused the right wing to fail. The aircraft then began to disintegrate at an altitude of 6,750 feet (2,060 m) and crashed in flames into the ground at about 16:48, killing all 85 people on board.

Witnesses said the Electra, a modified version of the trouble-plagued Lockheed aircraft that had experienced two wing-failure accidents in 1959 and 1960, had exploded before it hit the ground, and that pieces "fishtailed" down through sheets of rain, but the FBI did not suspect a criminal cause. Cloyce Floyd of Dawson, about one mile (1.6 km) from the crash scene, was driving in the rain when he saw an "orange flash". He said, "I looked over to the left, and I could see this red ball of fire hanging back there about the size of the sun. From the glare of the fire, I could see the fuselage sort of fishtailing down. Then it hit and exploded."

A Mexia firefighter stated that the "wreckage was scattered all over the place."

== Investigation ==
The National Transportation Safety Board (NTSB) investigated the accident. The flight data recorder (FDR) and cockpit voice recorder (CVR) were recovered from the wreckage with their data mostly intact, and the cockpit audio was reconstructed and transcribed. The NTSB correlated the cockpit conversations with the ATC communications transcript and noted that it was the first officer, at the captain's request, who asked ATC about reports of hail in the area. ATC replied that it had no reports of hail because other aircraft had "all deviated around to the east." At that point, the captain advised the first officer: "No, don't talk to him too much. I'm hearing his conversation on this. He's trying to get us to admit (we're makin) big mistake coming through here."

Shortly thereafter, the first officer stated: "It looks worse to me over there." The crew then requested and received clearance from ATC for the 180° turn. The turn became extremely steep, with a bank angle greater than 90° and a nose pitch-down angle of 40°. As the crew was trying to recover from the turn, the FDR indicated a peak acceleration of 4.3 g, which the NTSB concluded caused overstress to the airframe and resulted in its breakup.

On June 19, 1969, the NTSB issued its final report, which included the following statement: "Probable Cause: The stressing of the aircraft structure beyond its ultimate strength during an attempted recovery from an unusual attitude induced by turbulence associated with a thunderstorm. The operation in the turbulence resulted from a decision to penetrate an area of known severe weather."

In 2023, a copy of the CVR recording was located in an archive of a Dallas recording studio. The recording was posted to the YouTube channel of the Fort Worth Star-Telegram on April 27, 2023.

== See also ==
- List of accidents and incidents involving commercial aircraft
