= Banyon =

American television series

- Banyon title card
- Genre: Detective fiction
- Starring: Robert Forster; Joan Blondell; Richard Jaeckel
- Country of origin: United States
- Original language: English
- No. of seasons: 1
- No. of episodes: 15 (+ 1 TV movie)

Production
- Producer: Quinn Martin
- Running time: 60 minutes
- Production companies: QM Productions; Warner Bros. Television

Original release
- Network: NBC
- Release: September 15, 1972 – January 12, 1973

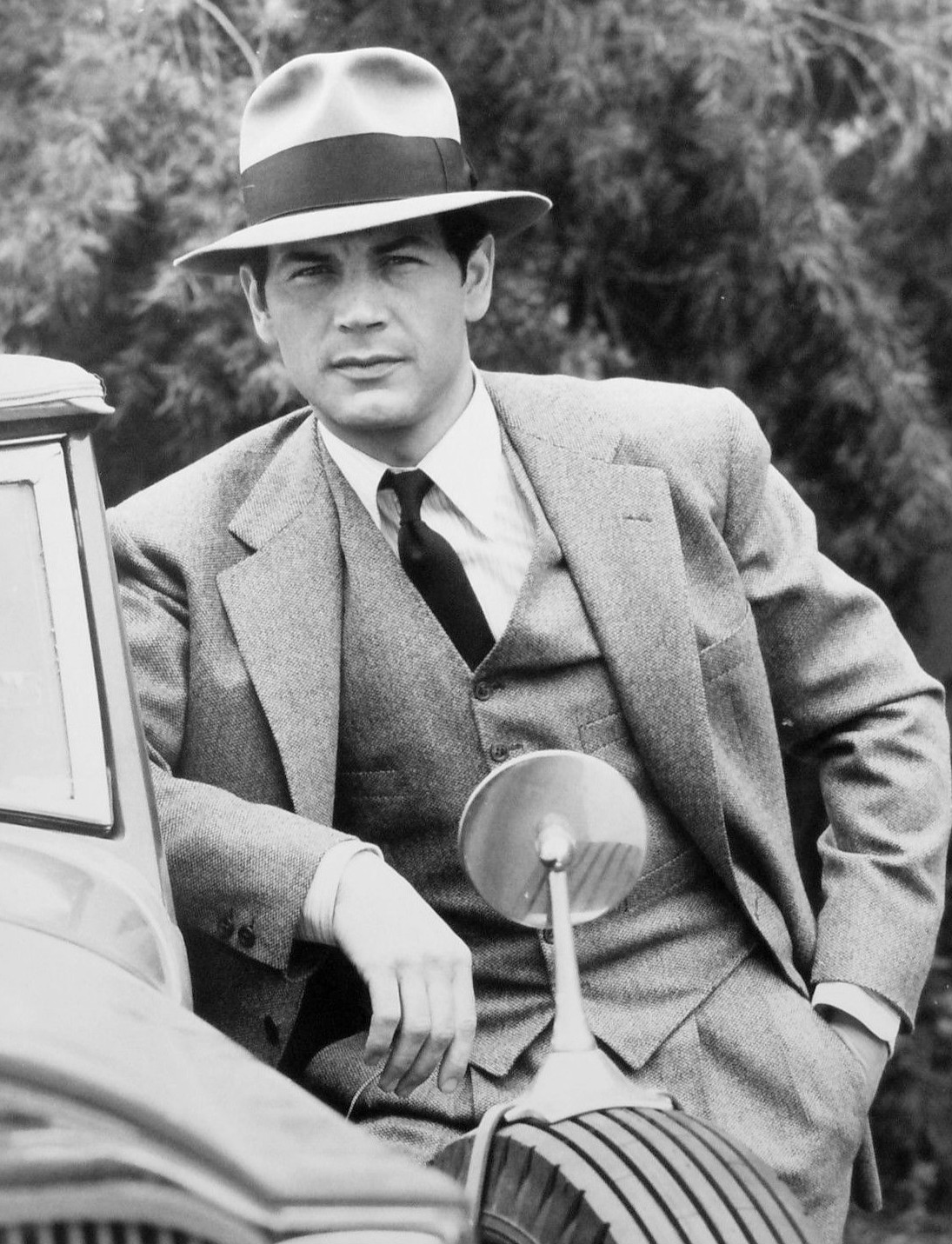
Forster as Banyon

Banyon is a detective series broadcast in the United States by NBC as part of its 1972–73 television schedule. The series was broadcast on Fridays from 10:00 p.m. to 11:00 p.m. EST beginning September 15, 1972, with the final episode shown on January 12, 1973. A standalone two-hour television movie was broadcast in 1971. The series was a Quinn Martin Production (in association with Warner Bros. Television).

== Synopsis ==
Banyon was a period drama set in the late 1930s in Los Angeles. It concerned the life of private investigator Miles C. Banyon (Robert Forster), a tough-but-honest detective who would accept essentially any case for US$20/day. Banyon's police acquaintance with the Los Angeles Police Department was the cynical Lieutenant Pete McNeil (Richard Jaeckel).

Located in the same complex (the famed Bradbury Building) as Banyon's office was the secretarial school operated by Peggy Revere (Joan Blondell). By an agreement between Banyon and Revere, part of the training provided to these young women was a period serving as Banyon's secretary; this gave him the advantage of not having to provide a salary for a secretary.

Besides Revere, the other ongoing female character was Banyon's girlfriend, Abby Graham (Julie Gregg), a nightclub singer who was constantly trying to encourage him to "settle down" and marry her.

== Cancellation ==
Banyon was unable to find an adequate audience and lost in the Nielsen ratings to ABC's Love, American Style and movies on CBS and was canceled midseason. Despite the show's short life, Quentin Tarantino liked Forster's performance as the title character so much that he hired him for the feature film Jackie Brown many years later.

== Episodes ==
No.	Title	Directed by	Written by	Original release date
0	"Pilot"	Robert Day	Ed Adamson	March 15, 1971
Two-hour TV-movie; A young woman is found dead in Banyon's office, shot with Banyon's gun. Though he temporarily loses his private investigator's license Banyon tracks down the person responsible for the woman's murder.José Ferrer, Leslie Parrish, Herb Edelman, Hermione Gingold and Anjanette Comer guest star.
1	"The Decent Thing to Do"	Ralph Senensky	William P. McGivern	September 15, 1972
When a man who hires Banyon as his bodyguard is murdered, Banyon does his best to solve the crime. Collin Wilcox, Frank Aletter and Marlyn Mason guest star.
2	"The Old College Try"	Richard Donner	Ed Adamson; Theodore J. Flicker; Norman Katkov	September 22, 1972
Banyon solves a campus killing and saves a bereaved father from the clutches of a greedy woman. Jessica Walter, Shelly Novack, Darrell Larson and Tim O'Connor guest star.
3	"The Graveyard Vote"	Ralph Senensky	Milton S. Gelman; Carey Wilber	September 29, 1972
Political intrigue develops when Banyon investigates the murder of a candidate for state attorney general. Diana Hyland, Tom Bosley, Larry Gates and Pat O'Brien guest star.
4	"Completely Out of Print"	Daniel Petrie	Norman Katkov	October 6, 1972
A pulp magazine publisher hires Banyon to find his missing star writer. Fritz Weaver, Rosemary Murphy, Phillip Pine and John Sylvester White guest star.
5	"Meal Ticket"	Lawrence Dobkin	James D. Buchanan; Milton S. Gelman	October 13, 1972
Immediately after a boxer scores an upset victory, he disappears and Banyon is hired to find him. Gabriel Dell, James McCallion, Bo Svenson and Sharon Farrell guest star.
6	"The Clay Clarinet"	Charles S. Dubin	Jack Sher	October 27, 1972
A famous but obnoxious bandleader hires Banyon to find out who is trying to kill him. Jack Sheldon, Fred Sadoff, E. J. Peaker and John Saxon guest star.
7	"Dead End"	Ralph Senensky	Milton S. Gelman	November 3, 1972
After being officially ordered off a case, a policeman (Jack Cassidy) hires Banyon to solve a suspected murder that has nagged him for almost seven years. Billy "Green" Bush, Morgan Sterne and Diana Muldaur guest star.
8	"Time to Kill"	Arthur H. Nadel	Ed Adamson	November 10, 1972
Behind the scenes of a dance marathon of the 1930s, Banyon exposes a death hoax and the "second lift" of an ex-Busby Berkeley chorus girl (Jo Ann Pflug). Dick Van Patten and Barbara Babcock guest star.
9	"Think of Me Kindly"	Marvin J. Chomsky	George F. Slavin; Milton S. Gelman	November 17, 1972
Another private detective is hired by Banyon to handle a routine case, but the detective ends up getting murdered. Dabney Coleman, Ahna Capri, Gerald Hiken and Norma Crane guest star.
10	"A Date with Death"	Charles S. Dubin	Morton Fine; Milton S. Gelman	November 24, 1972
In the midst of investigating the murder of a dime-a-dance hostess, Banyon clashes with an aggressive stage mother. Allen Garfield, Meredith MacRae, Eileen Heckart, Lane Bradbury, Teri Garr and Vincent Beck guest star.
11	"Sally Overman Is Missing"	Lawrence Dobkin	Milton S. Gelman	December 1, 1972
Stolen information smuggled in the brain of Banyon's beautiful secretary, Sally Overman (Jo Ann Harris), makes her a target for murder. Robert Webber, Karen Carlson and Curt Conway guest star.
12	"The Lady Killer"	Valentin de Vargas	Nelson Gidding; Robert C. Dennis	December 8, 1972
A young waitress hires Banyon to find a driver who ran her down in an attempt to kill her. Jack Klugman, Elaine Giftos, Kristina Holland, Don Chastain, Marian McCargo, Arch Johnson and Paul Sorensen guest star.
13	"The Murder Game"	Reza Badiyi	William P. McGivern	December 15, 1972
An old girlfriend of Banyon's, now a tennis pro, seeks his assistance after being frightened by two men. Kaz Garas, Skye Aubrey, Leigh Hamilton and Gregory Sierra guest star.
14	"Just Once"	Marvin J. Chomsky	Mann Rubin	December 22, 1972
Banyon tries to find out why an ex-convict was gunned down just one day after being released from prison. Murray Matheson, Dennis Redfield, Ed Flanders and Janice Rule guest star.
15	"Time Lapse"	Daniel Petrie	Ed Adamson; Milton S. Gelman	January 12, 1973
While tracking down an ex-husband behind on his alimony payments, Banyon ends up being held captive by a major gangster. Estelle Winwood, John Fiedler, Donna Mills, Anne Seymour, Ken Lynch and Charles McGraw guest star.
