= That's Life (1968 TV series) =

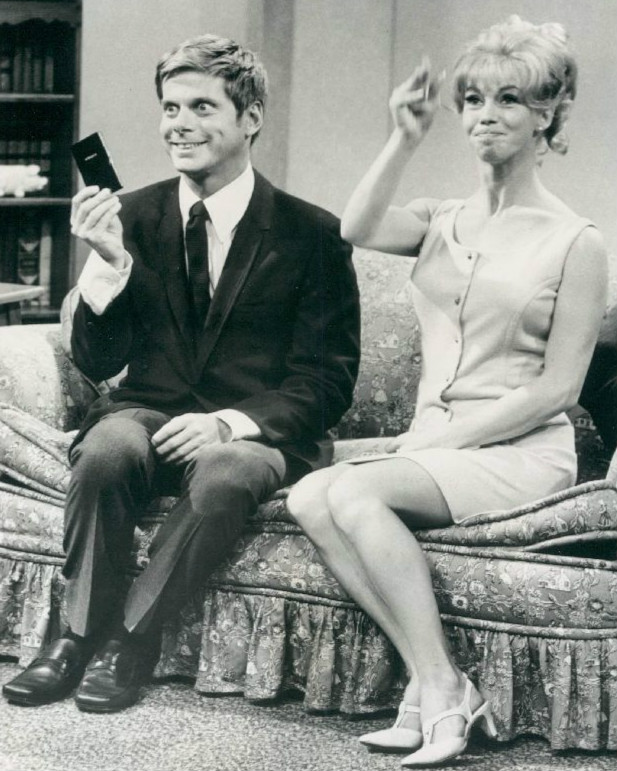
- Robert Morse as Robert Dickson (left) and E. J. Peaker as Gloria Quigley Dickson (right)
- Genre: Musical comedy
- Created by: Marvin Marx
- Written by: Marvin Marx; Bob Ellison; Rod Parker; Walter Stone
- Directed by: Stan Harris
- Starring: Robert Morse; E. J. Peaker
- Composer: Walter Marks
- Country of origin: United States
- Original language: English
- No. of episodes: 26

Production
- Executive producer: Marvin Marx
- Producer: Stan Harris
- Production locations: Hollywood, Los Angeles, California; New York City, New York
- Editors: Al Pastor; Mike Wenig; Paul Henson
- Running time: 60 minutes
- Production company: Domar Productions

Original release
- Network: American Broadcasting Company
- Release: September 24, 1968 – April 1, 1969

That's Life is an American musical comedy television series that premiered on the American Broadcasting Company from 24 September 1968 to 1 April 1969. Starring Robert Morse (as Robert Dickson) and E. J. Peaker (as Gloria Quigley Dickson).

The series focused on the lives of Bobby and Gloria, from their first meeting through their marriage, as their lives progressed, through Gloria's pregnancy and childbirth, as well as Bobby's work experiences at the Miller Chalk Company. Characters often broke into song, in the manner of musical plays and movies. Songs included well-known numbers (for example, Morse doing a duet with an office computer on "Anything You Can Do," and guest star Ethel Merman with a rendition of "Think Pink" (from the movie Funny Face) and original tunes written for the program itself (a probable reason the episodes have never been released to home video, as rights would need to be secured for the songs; a handful of clips have been posted to YouTube).

Kay Medford had a recurring role as Gloria's mother, Mrs. Quigley, who was often antagonistic to Bobby; Agnes Moorehead (at the time a co-star of ABC's hit sitcom Bewitched) appeared as Bobby's mother in one episode.

== Guest stars ==
- The Doodletown Pipers
- Shelley Berman
- George Burns
- Sid Caesar
- Tim Conway
- Rodney Dangerfield
- Paul Ford
- Robert Goulet
- Phil Harris
- Goldie Hawn
- Alan King
- Michele Lee
- Paul Lynde
- Guy Marks
- Kay Medford
- Ethel Merman
- Agnes Moorehead
- Tony Randall
- Dick Shawn
- Phil Silvers
- The Turtles
- Leslie Uggams
- Jackie Vernon
- Betty White
