= The Badlanders =

1958 film by Delmer Daves

- Directed by: Delmer Daves
- Written by: Richard Collins
- Based on: The Asphalt Jungle; 1949 novel by W. R. Burnett
- Produced by: Aaron Rosenberg
- Starring: Alan Ladd; Ernest Borgnine
- Cinematography: John Seitz
- Edited by: William H. Webb; James Baiotto
- Color process: Metrocolor
- Production company: Arcola Productions
- Distributed by: Metro-Goldwyn-Mayer
- Release date: September 3, 1958
- Running time: 85 minutes
- Country: United States
- Language: English
- Budget: $1,436,000
- Box office: $2,105,000

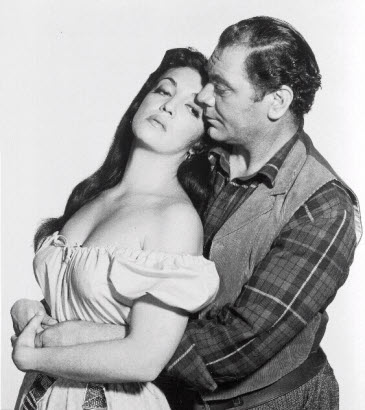
Scene with Katy Jurado and Ernest Borgnine

The Badlanders is a 1958 American western caper film directed by Delmer Daves and starring Alan Ladd and Ernest Borgnine. Based on the 1949 novel The Asphalt Jungle by W. R. Burnett, the story was given an 1898 setting by screenwriter Richard Collins.

It is the second film adaptation of the novel following 1950's The Asphalt Jungle. Anthony Caruso was also in the original version of the film, playing the safecracker, Ciavelli.

== Plot ==
In 1898, two men are released from the Arizona Territorial Prison. One, mining engineer and geologist Peter Van Hoek, nicknamed the "Dutchman", tells the warden he was framed for the robbery of a gold shipment from the Lisbon Mine. The other, John McBain, killed Bascomb, the man who cheated him out of his land.

The two men head separately to the town of Prescott, location of the Lisbon Mine, where neither is welcome. The marshal, whom Van Hoek accuses of framing him, orders him to leave town on the next stagecoach, at sundown the next day. The Dutchman gives his word that he will be on the stage. At the hotel, the Dutchman meets guest Ada Winton, the lonely mistress of Cyril Lounsberry.

McBain rescues a Mexican woman, Anita, when men accost her on the street. Though Leslie, the deputy, saves McBain's life in the ensuing fight, he gives McBain the same deadline to leave, even though McBain's folks settled the township. A grateful Anita invites McBain to stay in her place, and the two are attracted to each other. She admits having been a prostitute but McBain finally does not care.

The Dutchman gets prominent businessman Sample, whom he knew when he worked at the mine as an engineer, to introduce him to Lounsberry, whose wife owns the Lisbon Mine. Lounsberry had married Bascomb's homely sister for her money. Van Hoek offers to sell him gold ore from an extremely rich deposit that only he knows about. It is worth at least $200,000, but Van Hoek will be satisfied with half that amount in cash. He lies when Lounsberry jokingly asks if it is from his wife's mine. The prospect of being a rich man in his own right and leaving for Europe with Ada makes Lounsberry agree.

Van Hoek recruits a reluctant McBain and demolition expert Vincente for his scheme. They time it so the explosion needed to extract the ore goes off at the same time as the regular blasting. They get the ore out, but when Van Hoek and McBain take it to Lounsberry, he tries to double cross them. Leslie, who is working with Lounsberry, is killed and McBain wounded in the ensuing gunfight. Van Hoek takes McBain to Anita's place and digs out the bullet, then leaves in a wagon with the gold. However, Lounsberry, Sample and their men soon corner him in town during a fiesta. McBain goes to the Dutchman's aid. Then Anita has her many Mexican friends surround and disarm the villains. Van Hoek entrusts McBain and Anita with the gold, telling them he will meet them later in Durango to split it up equally. Then, keeping his word to the sheriff, he leaves on the stagecoach with fellow passenger Ada.

== Cast ==
- Alan Ladd as Peter Van Hoek
- Ernest Borgnine as John McBain
- Katy Jurado as Anita
- Claire Kelly as Ada Winton
- Kent Smith as Cyril Lounsberry
- Nehemiah Persoff as Vincente
- Robert Emhardt as Sample
- Anthony Caruso as Comanche
- Adam Williams as Leslie
- Ford Rainey as Prison Warden
- John Daheim as Lee

== Production ==
The movie was produced by Aaron Rosenberg, who had a deal to make films for MGM. Originally it was announced that the star would be William Holden. Then James Cagney and Paul Newman were going to play the leads. Eventually Alan Ladd signed to star; it was his first movie at MGM. Ernest Borgnine was his co-star.

Shooting took place at the MGM studio with three weeks location work in Kingman, Arizona. The movie was also shot at Old Tucson Studios.

Ernest Borgnine and Katy Jurado fell in love during the making of the film and were married.

== Reception ==
According to MGM records, the film earned $970,000 in the US and Canada and $1,135,000 elsewhere resulting in a loss of $373,000.
