= Claire Kelly =

American actress (1934–1998)

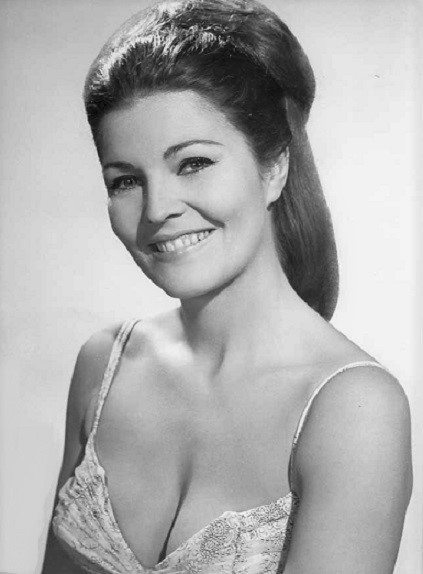
- Kelly, c. 1960
- Born: Claire Ann Green; March 15, 1934; San Francisco, California, U.S.
- Died: July 1, 1998 (aged 64); Palm Springs, California, U.S.
- Education: Neighborhood Playhouse School of the Theatre
- Occupations: Actress; model
- Years active: 1955–1972
- Spouses: George DeWitt (m. 1951; div. 1955) Perry Lopez (m. 1960; div. 1961) Robert Kenaston (m. 1961; div. 1963): Robert Murphy
- Children: 2

Claire Kelly (March 15, 1934 – July 1, 1998) was an American actress and model.

== Early life ==
Born Claire Ann Green, the daughter of a wealthy California rancher, she was trained at the Neighborhood Playhouse in New York.

Kelly started out as a model in Miami, and appeared several times on the cover of McCall's, continuing her modelling career throughout the 1950s. She made the cover of Picture Week in 1956, and was a 1958 Deb Star.

== Career ==
Kelly went on to roles in films such as Snowfire (1958), The Badlanders (1958), Party Girl (1958), Ask Any Girl (1959), and A Guide for the Married Man (1967). In The Badlanders, a Western remake of the film noir The Asphalt Jungle, she played "the Angela role immortalized by Marilyn Monroe" in the original film. In 1959, she was publicized as "the screen's most exciting discovery since Rita Hayworth". In 1964–65, she appeared in several episodes of the television series Burke's Law.

== Personal life ==
From 1951 to 1955, Kelly was married to singer-comedian George DeWitt. She was credited as Claire DeWitt in Son of Sinbad. They had a son, Nicholas.

On November 6, 1954, Kelly's three-year-old son, Nicholas Christopher DeWitt, died after fighting for three days in an iron lung at Variety Children's Hospital in Miami, Florida, the victim of a rare anesthetic hazard, which happened after he was bitten on the lip by Duke, a Cocker Spaniel owned by former featherweight champion Willie Pep, and his heart stopped beating as doctors repaired the damage with 25 stitches.

On March 27, 1960, she married actor Perry Lopez in North Hollywood. After they divorced, she married banking heir Robert Alan Kenaston, son of actress Billie Dove, on October 21, 1961, in Juarez, Mexico. They had a son, Robert Burns Kenaston. They divorced on July 22, 1963. She later married Robert Murphy, and was married to him until her death.

Kelly has had relationships with Lance Reventlow and Conrad Hilton Jr. She once dismissed Prince Aly Khan as "gauche" and Elvis Presley as "a mere child".

== Filmography ==
=== Film ===
Year	Title	Role	Notes
1955	Son of Sinbad	Tartar Girl	Uncredited
1956	The Best Things in Life Are Free	Chorus Girl	Uncredited
1956	Scandal Incorporated	June Trapping	
1958	Underwater Warrior	Anne Winnmore	
1958	Snowfire	Carol Hampton	
1958	The Badlanders	Ada Winton	
1958	Party Girl	Genevieve Farrell	
1959	Ask Any Girl	Lisa	
1965	The Loved One	Whispering Glades Hostess	
1967	A Guide for the Married Man	Harriet Stander	
1969	Childish Things	Sharon	
1969	What Ever Happened to Aunt Alice?	Elva	
1970	Up Your Teddy Bear	Miss Boota, sculptress	

=== Television ===
Year	Title	Role	Notes
1955	The Bob Cummings Show	Miss Kelly	Episode: "The Wolf Sitter"
1956	The People's Choice	Melinda	Episode: "Aunt Gus Leaves Sock"
1956	Kings Row	Little Egypt	Episode: "Carnival"
1957	Richard Diamond, Private Detective		Episode: "The Mickey Farmer Case"
1957	The Adventures of Rin Tin Tin		Episode: "Frontier Angel"
1958	Love That Jill		Episode: "Tonight's the Night"
1959	Northwest Passage	Lucy	Episode: "The Killers"
1960	Tightrope!	Linda Costain	Episode: "Three to Make Ready"
1960	Bachelor Father	Laura Evans	Episode: "Kelly and the College Man"
1960	The Texan	Gail Henshaw	Episode: "Lady Tenderfoot"
1961	Surfside 6	Pat Wheeler	Episode: "Ghost of a Chance"
1964–1965	Burke's Law	2nd Model / Samantha	2 episodes
1967	The Monkees	Dr. Sisters	S1:E29, "Monkees Get Out More Dirt"
1969	The F.B.I.	Secretary	Episode: "Gamble with Death"
1972	Love Story	Landlady	Episode: "Night of the Tanks"
