= Quick, Before It Melts =

1964 film directed by Delbert Mann

- Lobby card
- Directed by: Delbert Mann
- Screenplay by: Dale Wasserman
- Based on: Quick, Before It Melts (novel) by Philip Benjamin
- Produced by: Douglas Laurence; Delbert Mann
- Starring: George Maharis; Robert Morse; James Gregory; Anjanette Comer
- Cinematography: Russell Harlan
- Edited by: Fredric Steinkamp
- Music by: David Rose
- Distributed by: Metro-Goldwyn Mayer
- Release date: October 5, 1964
- Running time: 97 minutes
- Country: United States
- Language: English

Quick, Before It Melts is a 1964 American Panavision and Metrocolor comedy film directed by Delbert Mann, starring Robert Morse, George Maharis, and Anjanette Comer and released by Metro-Goldwyn-Mayer. It was written by Dale Wasserman based on the novel of the same title by Philip Benjamin.

== Plot ==
American magazine reporter Oliver Cannon gets an assignment to a naval expedition far from home by his boss, Harvey Sweigert, who is also the father of Oliver's fiancée, Sharon. He has never broken a big story, so Sweigert wants to see what kind of reporter he really is.

First stop is New Zealand, where photographer Pete Santelli, also along on the trip, quickly develops a romantic attraction to a local girl named Diana. And a half-Maori beauty named Tiare catches the interest of Oliver.

When the journalists move on to Antarctica, it becomes clear that a friendly Soviet citizen, Mikhail, whom they call Mickey, might be persuaded to defect. Women are invited to join the expedition, including Diana and Tiare, and the latter ends up falling in love with Mickey. Their romance and his defection is news, but a naval admiral tries to prevent Oliver from reporting his scoop to the world. Oliver shows what he's made of, then returns home to marry Sharon.

== Cast ==
- Robert Morse as Oliver Cannon
- George Maharis as Pete Santelli
- Howard St. John as Harvey Sweigert
- Yvonne Craig as Sharon Sweigert
- Anjanette Comer as Tiare
- Janine Gray as Diana
- Michael Constantine as Mikhail
- James Gregory as the Admiral

== Reception ==
Variety wrote: "Dale Wasserman's screenplay, based on Philip Benjamin novel, is slotted in a light vein which seldom wavers and Mann's deft direction maintains a nonsensical note in keeping with the storyline. ... Both Maharis and Morse sock over their roles and Mann gets the most out of his supporting cast, all wrapping up the parts neatly. Film gets certain authentic polar background through Metro sending a camera unit to Alaska to lens ice and snow and photography of Russell Harlan is interesting."

Boxoffice wrote: "This is fun-packed farce comedy utilizing a young and handsome cast. Robert Morse, introduced to the screen audiences in Honeymoon Hotel, following a Broadway success "How to Succeed in Business Without Trying," as a shy magazine writer given an assignment nobody else wants, has a perfect foil in the dashing, resourceful ladies-man, George Maharis. Between them they turn a scientific expedition into an international riot."

The Monthly Film Bulletin wrote: "Despite some bright playing, this variant on the traditional American Service comedy never gets off the ground. Any hope that the situation will improve once the action moves to the southern hemisphere is soon daunted: the combination of romantic dalliance, Service high jinks and hectic journalism remains uniformly flat all through. The unusual and delicate colour employed in the scenes set in Sharon's apartment is attractive, but elsewhere there is little to praise in this witless effort."
