= The Appaloosa =

1966 film by Sidney J. Furie

- Theatrical poster
- Directed by: Sidney J. Furie
- Written by: James Bridges; Roland Kibbee
- Based on: The Appaloosa by Robert MacLeod
- Produced by: Alan Miller
- Starring: Marlon Brando; Anjanette Comer; John Saxon; Emilio Fernández; Míriam Colón
- Cinematography: Russell Metty
- Edited by: Ted J. Kent
- Music by: Frank Skinner
- Color process: Technicolor
- Production company: Universal Pictures
- Distributed by: Universal Pictures
- Release date: 1966
- Running time: 99 minutes
- Country: United States
- Language: English
- Box office: $1 million (US/ Canada rentals)

The Appaloosa (also known as Southwest to Sonora) is a 1966 American Western film starring Marlon Brando, Anjanette Comer, and John Saxon, who was nominated for a Golden Globe for Best Supporting Actor for his portrayal of a Mexican bandit. The film was directed by Sidney J. Furie, and shot in Techniscope in California, Utah, and Arizona.

== Plot ==
Based on the 1963 book by Robert MacLeod, the title character is a beautiful horse (a breed, the Appaloosa) belonging to Matt Fletcher (Marlon Brando), a Mexican-American buffalo hunter.

When Fletcher returns home he enters a church to confess his sins. A powerful bandit, Chuy Medina (John Saxon) is tricked by his girlfriend, Trini (Anjanette Comer) to follow him inside and threaten Fletcher. Meantime, Trini mounts the appaloosa horse and tries to ride off and escape Medina. Other townsmen in Ojo Prieto stop her and tell Medina she was running away. To save face, Medina says he'd told Trini to try out the horse as he is buying it. Fletcher doesn't want to sell, but is forced to give up the horse. Later, we learn Trini was sold to Chuy at the age of 15, but he does not respect her.

Fletcher begins to hunt down Medina to recapture his horse, but is caught and subjected to torture and humiliation by Medina and his gang. He later escapes.

A later foray into Medina's camp results in a brutal arm wrestling match in a bar between Fletcher and the bandido. Fletcher loses and is stung on the arm by a scorpion. Again left to die, Fletcher is rescued by Trini, who despises her "lover", Chuy, and prefers Fletcher's company. She gets him assistance from a kindly old peasant, which later costs the old man his life.

During the violence-laden climax, Fletcher is forced to choose between Trini and his beloved Appaloosa. Fletcher, realizing that Trini means more to him than the horse, sends out the Appaloosa to draw Chuy's fire. As the bandit prepares to aim for the horse, sunlight glints on his gun barrel, revealing his position. Fletcher fires and kills him. Fletcher and Trini then cross the border with the Appaloosa to start a new life.

== Cast ==
- Marlon Brando as Matt 'Mateo' Fletcher
- Anjanette Comer as Trini
- John Saxon as Chuy
- Emilio Fernández as Lazaro
- Alex Montoya as Squint Eye
- Míriam Colón as Ana
- Rafael Campos as Paco
- Frank Silvera as Ramos
- Larry D. Mann as Priest

== Production ==
The film was shot in shot in Wrightwood, Antelope Valley, and Lake Los Angeles, California; St. George, Utah; and Colorado City, Arizona. Parts of the film were also shot in Hurricane and at the Virgin River in Utah.

The film was John Saxon's favorite among his movies.

== Awards ==
The film was awarded the Bronze Wrangler by the National Cowboy & Western Heritage Museum for outstanding Western motion picture of 1966.

== See also ==
- List of films about horses
- List of American films of 1966
