= Dawson Junior/Senior High School =

Dawson Junior / Senior High School

Location
- 199 N School Ave. Dawson, Texas 76639; United States; 31.897604°N 96.711611°W

Information
- Type: Public
- Principal: Robert Bray
- Teaching staff: 38.98 (on an FTE basis)
- Grades: PK-12
- Enrollment: 628 (2024–2025)
- Student to teacher ratio: 16.11
- Colors: Black and gold
- Athletics conference: UIL Class 2A
- Mascot: Bulldog
- Website: http://www.dawsonisd.net

Dawson Junior / Senior High School is a public school based in Dawson, Texas. Dawson Junior / Senior High School serves southwestern Navarro County.

== Notable alumni ==
- Anjanette Comer, actress
