= Snowfire =

1958 film

- Theatrical poster.
- Directed by: Dorrell McGowan; Stuart E. McGowan
- Written by: Dorrell McGowan; Stuart E. McGowan
- Produced by: Dorrell McGowan; Stuart E. McGowan
- Starring: Don Megowan; Molly MacGowan
- Cinematography: Bryon Baker
- Edited by: Arthur H. Nadel; Jerry Young
- Music by: Albert Glasser
- Production company: Snowfire Productions
- Distributed by: Allied Artists Pictures
- Release date: May 18, 1958
- Running time: 73 minutes
- Country: United States
- Language: English

Snowfire is a 1958 American Western film written, directed and produced by Dorrell McGowan and Stuart E. McGowan, who had also co-produced the Sky King television series. The film stars Don Megowan, primarily a western actor, but better known as the monster in The Creature Walks Among Us. Molly McGowan and Claire Kelly also star.

== Premise ==
A little girl claims to be friends with a supposedly savage white stallion.

== Cast ==
- Don Megowan as Mike
- Molly McGowan as Molly
- Claire Kelly as Carol
- John L. Cason as Buff (as John Cason)
- Michael Vallon as Poco (as Mike Vallon)
- Melody McGowan as Melodie (as Melodie McGowan)
- Rusty Wescoatt as Link
- Bill Hale as Skip
- King Cotton the Horse as Snowfire

== See also ==
- List of films about horses
