= Lepke (film) =

1975 film by Menahem Golan

- Directed by: Menahem Golan
- Screenplay by: Wesley Lau; Tamar Hoffs
- Story by: Wesley Lau
- Produced by: Yoram Globus; Menahem Golan
- Starring: Tony Curtis; Michael Callan; Anjanette Comer
- Cinematography: Andrew Davis
- Music by: Kenneth Wannberg
- Production company: AmeriEuro Corp
- Distributed by: Warner Bros. Pictures
- Release date: June 11, 1975
- Running time: 123 minutes
- Country: United States
- Language: English
- Budget: $900,000

Lepke is a 1975 film starring Tony Curtis as the Jewish-American gangster Louis "Lepke" Buchalter. It is often regarded by film critics as one of Tony Curtis's most underrated movies and one of his finest performances.

== Cast ==
- Tony Curtis as Louis "Lepke" Buchalter
- Anjanette Comer as Bernice Meyer
- Michael Callan as Robert Kane
- Warren Berlinger as Jacob "Gurrah" Shapiro
- Gianni Russo as Albert "Lord High Executioner" Anastasia
- Milton Berle as Mr. Meyer
- Vic Tayback as Charlie "Lucky" Luciano
- Mary Charlotte Wilcox as Marion
- Vaughn Meader as Walter Winchell

== Production ==
Menahem Golan had been a successful filmmaker in Israel and had ambitions to break into Hollywood. Lepke was to be the first of four films he intended to make there. Golan said he chose Lepke as a subject because he grew up on American gangster films of Bogart and Cagney. "I was afraid to touch a contemporary American subject and be disgraced like Miloš Forman and Antonioni," he said in a 1974 interview. "If you go back to the old then at least you and the young people are starting on the same foot. And besides, Lepke was a Jewish gangster rather than an Italian."

It was Curtis' first feature in a number of years - he had been working in TV and on the stage. Curtis called it "the best role I've ever had. Helluva colorful character and I age from 26 to 45 and die in the electric chair. And, you know, the guy who gave me the part came from Israel. No Hollywood producer would cast me for it."

Filming took place at Culver City studios.

In his 2008 autobiography American Prince Curtis admitted becoming heavily addicted to cocaine during filming; this addiction would last for a decade and significantly derailed his already troubled film career. His mother died during filming.

Golan intended to make two more period gangster films in succession to use the same sets and costumes to save money but only The Four Deuces was made - the third, Kill the Dutchman about Dutch Schultz, was not made until 1992.

== Release ==
The film was sold to Warner Bros for $1.75 million.

== Bibliography ==
- Curtis, Tony; Golenbock, Peter (2008). American Prince: A Memoir. Crown. ISBN 0307408493.
