= The Fish Shanty =

Historic restaurant in Los Angeles, California

- Interactive map of The Fish Shanty

General information
- Status: Demolished
- Location: Los Angeles, California, 358 S. La Cienega Boulevard, United States
- Coordinates: 34.07124°N 118.37702°W
- Opened: 1950
- Closed: 1988
- Demolished: 1989

The Fish Shanty, also known as the Smith Bros. Fish Shanty, was an historic restaurant located in Los Angeles, California. It was located at 358 S. La Cienega Boulevard and Burton Way on Restaurant Row.

== History ==
The Fish Shanty was established in 1950. Its milieu was a "distinctive marine setting," a "nautical atmosphere that included a ship’s wheel, lavender leather booths, and an aquarium with turtles in the entryway." The Shanty was used in the 1965 black comedy, The Loved One, as the entrance to a British club. The restaurant closed in 1988, and the vacant building was damaged in a fire in 1989, leading to it being demolished.

The Shanty had a branch in the Walteria neighborhood of Torrance, California.
