= Leigh Hamilton =

American actress

- Hamilton in A Man, a Woman, and a Bank (1979)
- Born: Leigh Hiene; December 20, 1949; Auckland, New Zealand
- Died: September 8, 2012 (aged 62); Santa Monica, California, U.S.
- Occupation: Actress
- Children: 1

Leigh Hamilton (December 20, 1949 – September 8, 2012) was a New Zealand-born American actress and art gallery owner.

Hamilton was born in Auckland, New Zealand, on December 20, 1949, to parents, Colleen and Derek Hiene. She moved to the United States to pursue acting. She began her career with small television roles during the 1970s, including parts on Kojak, The Mod Squad, Baretta, Banyon, and McMillan & Wife.

Hamilton co-starred in several films from the 1970s to the 1990s, including A Man, a Woman, and a Bank in 1979, Forced Vengeance in 1982, and Gas Food Lodging in 1992. She was also cast in smaller parts 1987's P.K. and the Kid and Hocus Pocus, a 1993 Halloween-themed comedic film starring Sarah Jessica Parker, Bette Midler, and Kathy Najimy.

In 1994, Hamilton opened the Hamilton Galleries in the Pacific Palisades, Los Angeles, and simultaneously left acting to focus on her art business. She represented California-based artists, including Brooke Adams, who had co-starred with Hamilton in A Man, a Woman, and a Bank and Gas Food Lodging. The Hamilton Galleries are now located on Ocean Avenue in Santa Monica, California, as of 2012.

Leigh Hamilton died at Saint John's Health Center in Santa Monica, California, on September 8, 2012, at age 62.
