= A Man, a Woman, and a Bank =

1979 film by Noel Black

A Man, A Woman, and A Bank
- Original theatrical poster
- Directed by: Noel Black
- Screenplay by: Raynold Gideon; Bruce A. Evans; Stuart Margolin
- Story by: Raynold Gideon; Bruce A. Evans
- Produced by: John B. Bennett; Peter Samuelson
- Starring: Donald Sutherland; Brooke Adams; Paul Mazursky
- Cinematography: Jack Cardiff
- Edited by: Carl Kress
- Music by: Bill Conti
- Production companies: Bennettfilms Inc. McNichol
- Distributed by: AVCO Embassy Pictures (United States)
- Release dates: September 8, 1979 (Canada); September 28, 1979 (NYC)
- Running time: 101 minutes
- Country: Canada
- Language: English
- Box office: $683,353 (US)

A Man, a Woman, and a Bank, also known as A Very Big Withdraw, is a 1979 Canadian comedy crime film directed by Noel Black, and starring Donald Sutherland, Brooke Adams and Paul Mazursky. The film was partially funded by McNichol, a production company formed by teenage actress Kristy McNichol, her manager-mother Carollyne and their representatives. This is the only film the McNichol team produced.

== Plot ==
A thief, Reese Halperin, and his accomplice, computer expert Norman Barrie, devise a scheme to break into a Vancouver bank.

While carrying out the bank's blueprints, Reese is inadvertently photographed by Stacey Bishop, who is taking pictures for the bank's advertising campaign. Reese and Stacey meet, and, complicating the burglary somewhat, fall in love.

== Cast ==
- Donald Sutherland as Reese Halperin
- Brooke Adams as Stacey Bishop
- Paul Mazursky as Norman Barrie
- Allan Kolman as Peter (as Allan Magicovsky)
- Leigh Hamilton as Marie
- Kung-Wu Huang as Mr. Tsang (as Tony Lee)

== Release ==
The film premiered with a gala presentation at the Toronto International Film Festival on September 8, 1979.
