= Guns for San Sebastian =

1968 film by Henri Verneuil

- French theatrical release poster
- Directed by: Henri Verneuil
- Written by: Serge Gance; Miguel Morayta; Ennio De Concini; James R. Webb (English screenplay)
- Based on: A Wall for San Sebastian by William Barby Faherty
- Produced by: Jacques Bar; Ernesto Enríquez
- Starring: Anthony Quinn; Anjanette Comer; Charles Bronson; Sam Jaffe; Silvia Pinal; Jorge Martínez de Hoyos; José Chávez; Jaime Fernández
- Cinematography: Armand Thirard
- Edited by: Françoise Bonnot
- Music by: Ennio Morricone
- Production companies: CIPRA; Producciones Enríquez
- Distributed by: Metro-Goldwyn-Mayer
- Release date: March 20, 1968
- Running time: 111 minutes (US)
- Countries: France; Italy; Mexico; United States
- Language: English

Guns for San Sebastian (French: La bataille de San Sebastian) is a 1968 French Western film based on the 1962 novel A Wall for San Sebastian, written by Rev. Fr. William Barnaby "Barby" Faherty, S.J. The film is directed by Frenchman Henri Verneuil, and stars Anthony Quinn, Anjanette Comer and Charles Bronson. The score is by Ennio Morricone, who would then use his work in this film as an inspiration for the main theme in The Mercenary. Filming took place in Sierra de Órganos National Park in the town of Sombrerete, Mexico. It was made as a co-production between France, Italy, and Mexico. It is a rare instance of a French Western actually being shot in Mexico, instead of substituting Spain or some similar European location.

== Plot ==
In 1746, on the lawless northern frontier of the Viceroyalty of New Spain, womanizing Mestizo outlaw and Spanish Royal Army deserter Leon Alastray (Anthony Quinn) is wounded and pursued into a church by a posse of soldiers. He is granted sanctuary by a sympathetic priest (Sam Jaffe), who refuses to turn Alastray over to the military. The Bishop sides with the army, and when the priest still refuses to hand Alastray over he is reassigned as pastor of a remote village, San Sebastian. The priest smuggles Alastray, who is both atheistic and anti-clerical, past the soldiers surrounding the church. Alastray feels guilty for what has happened to the priest, so he accompanies him to the village to ensure he gets there safely. However, he is angry and embittered throughout the trip.

They arrive at San Sebastian to find the church barely standing and the village abandoned. They ring the church bell to summon any Christians. The first to respond to the sound is a marauding vaquero who shoots the priest, mortally wounding him. However, his ringing of the church bell eventually brings the villagers out from the surrounding hills. They hide there because they are terrorized by Mestizo vaqueros and Yaqui Indians. The villagers mistake Alastray for a priest. He at first denies it and is scornful of them, but, guided by a persistent village woman, Kinita (Anjanette Comer), to whom he is attracted, decides to take on the role and organize the villagers. They are aided by the persuasive power of an accident the villagers think is a miracle.

Teclo (Charles Bronson), the leader of the Mestizo vaqueros, pretends to side with the villagers, but in reality he despises the Spanish half of his blood, rather than the Indian half. Teclo accordingly wants the villagers to renounce Roman Catholicism and live under his leadership in the hills. While Alastray organizes the men of the village to build an irrigation dam, the Yaqui attack and massacre many of the inhabitants of the village. The angry and bereaved villagers order Alastray out.

Alastray leaves, with Kinita following. He tells her all his life he has fallen just short of achieving something meaningful, and sends her back to the village. A storm of approaching riders is heard, and the two take cover. They see Teclo and Yaqui Chief Golden Lance (Jaime Fernández) together, and realize the alliance of these two means terrible things for the village.

Alastray goes to the provincial capital and, by blackmailing a former lover who is now the Governor's wife, obtains muskets, gunpowder, and a cannon, which he takes back to the village. When the villagers see the weapons, they are encouraged and willing to fight. Alastray first makes a peace overture to Golden Lance, which is successful until the Iago-like Teclo sabotages it and makes a Yaqui attack inevitable.

On the eve of the battle, the villagers ask Alastray to say Mass. He finally tells them he is not a priest, but they nonetheless accept him. Together, they repel the Yaqui attack on the village, but they use up most of their gunpowder and their prospects appear grim. However, a village boy out playing sees the vaqueros and the Yaquis gather in preparation for the next day's attack. During the night, Alastray and a few villagers set charges in a mountainside overlooking the gathering place, to explode rocks down onto the attackers.

In the morning, Teclo rides by and sees the fuse to the charges, but the villagers kill him before he can do anything about it. The Yaquis gather below the rocks, and, including Golden Lance, are killed when the charges are detonated. With the area pacified, both government authorities, the Bishop, and a new parish priest come to the village. A military officer recognizes Alastray during Mass and sends soldiers to arrest him. The villagers outwit the soldiers, who pursue a decoy. Alastray flees on horseback in the opposite direction and tells Kinita, who is leaving with him, that he now believes in the Christian God.

== Cast ==
- Anthony Quinn as Leon Alastray
- Anjanette Comer as Kinita
- Charles Bronson as Teclo
- Silvia Pinal as Felicia
- Sam Jaffe as Padre José
- Jaime Fernández as Golden Lance
- Jorge Martínez de Hoyos as Cayetano
- Rosa Furman as Agueda
- Leon Askin as Vicar General
- José Chávez as Antonito
- Ivan Desny as Col. Calleja
- Fernand Gravey as Governor
- Pedro Armendáriz Jr. as Father Lucas
- Jorge Russek as Pedro
- Aurora Clavel as Magdalena
- Julio Aldama as Diego
- José Ángel Espinosa "Ferrusquilla" as Luis
- Pancho Córdova as Kino
- Enrique Lucero as Renaldo
- Chano Urueta as Miguel
- Noé Murayama as Captain Lopez
- Guillermo Hernández as Timoteo
- Francisco Reiguera as Bishop
- Carlos Berriochea as Pablo
- Armando Acosta as Pascual
- Leon Askin as Monsignor

== Analysis ==
=== Differences between the novel and the film ===
The original novel by Faherty had the hero be a former soldier who became a Jesuit cleric, as opposed to the film's depiction of the hero as an army deserter and atheist bandit. The Indians in the novel were Comanche, rather than Yaqui, and the Iago-like Mestizo antagonist played by Charles Bronson does not appear in the book.
