= Banning (film) =

1967 film

- Film poster
- Directed by: Ron Winston
- Screenplay by: James Lee
- Story by: Hamilton Maule
- Produced by: Dick Berg
- Starring: Robert Wagner; Anjanette Comer; Jill St. John; Guy Stockwell; James Farentino
- Cinematography: Loyal Griggs
- Edited by: J. Terry Williams
- Music by: Quincy Jones
- Color process: Technicolor
- Production company: Universal Pictures
- Distributed by: Universal Pictures
- Release dates: June 30, 1967 (Nashville, Tennessee); December 13, 1967 (United States)
- Running time: 102 minutes
- Country: United States
- Language: English

Banning is a 1967 American drama sports film directed by Ron Winston and starring Robert Wagner, Jill St. John, Gene Hackman, Guy Stockwell and James Farentino.

== Plot ==
Mike McDermot is a rising golf star on the PGA Tour until he is accused of cheating. He supposedly has offered to split a winner's purse with a competitor, Jonathan Linus, if his opponent deliberately misses a final putt. In fact, the competitor is the one who approached him. McDermot refuses, so Jonathan Linus goes to another pro, Tommy Del Gaddo, whose glory days were behind him. Then they turn in McDermot, accusing him of their crime.

Linus retires from the PGA Tour and marries into a rich family. His wife is the daughter of a wealthy businessman in Arizona; through their money, they are now principals (President and General Manager) of an exclusive golf club, the El Presidente. Del Gaddo becomes the head pro at the club as reward for supporting Linus in winning the Eastern Open.

McDermot, now calling himself Mike Banning, arrives and threatens to expose them, so he is given the assistant pro's job to quiet him. Banning proceeds to lure the club's high rollers to stage a high-wager golf tournament, a Calcutta, in which two-man teams are auctioned off. All money is then put in a pot and split three ways between the teammates and their bidder.

Banning must win the tournament to earn enough money ($21,000) to pay off the mob, which had financed his trial on the PGA Tour. His life is at risk, as is that of his dentist, who took out the loan.

Banning knows the President cheats at high-stakes poker by appearing drunk on whiskey while actually drinking iced tea. Angela Barr, a wealthy local, wins the competitive bidding for Banning's team over the president's daughter. The president, who knew of Banning's background, had his daughter bid for him because he believed Banning's team would win.

Before play proceeds, Chris Patton tells the organizing committee that Banning is a former pro. Banning ends up giving up his handicap of five to play at scratch. He is informed that Patton provided this information and gets into a fight with him, almost killing him. Patton withdraws from the tournament and is replaced by Linus, now playing with his father-in-law, J. Pallister Young.

The tournament comes down to a sudden-death playoff, just as had happened in the ill-fated attempt to bribe Banning on the tour. On the 17th hole, with a life-saving shot, Banning makes a near impossible shot over a tall stand of trees.

== Cast ==
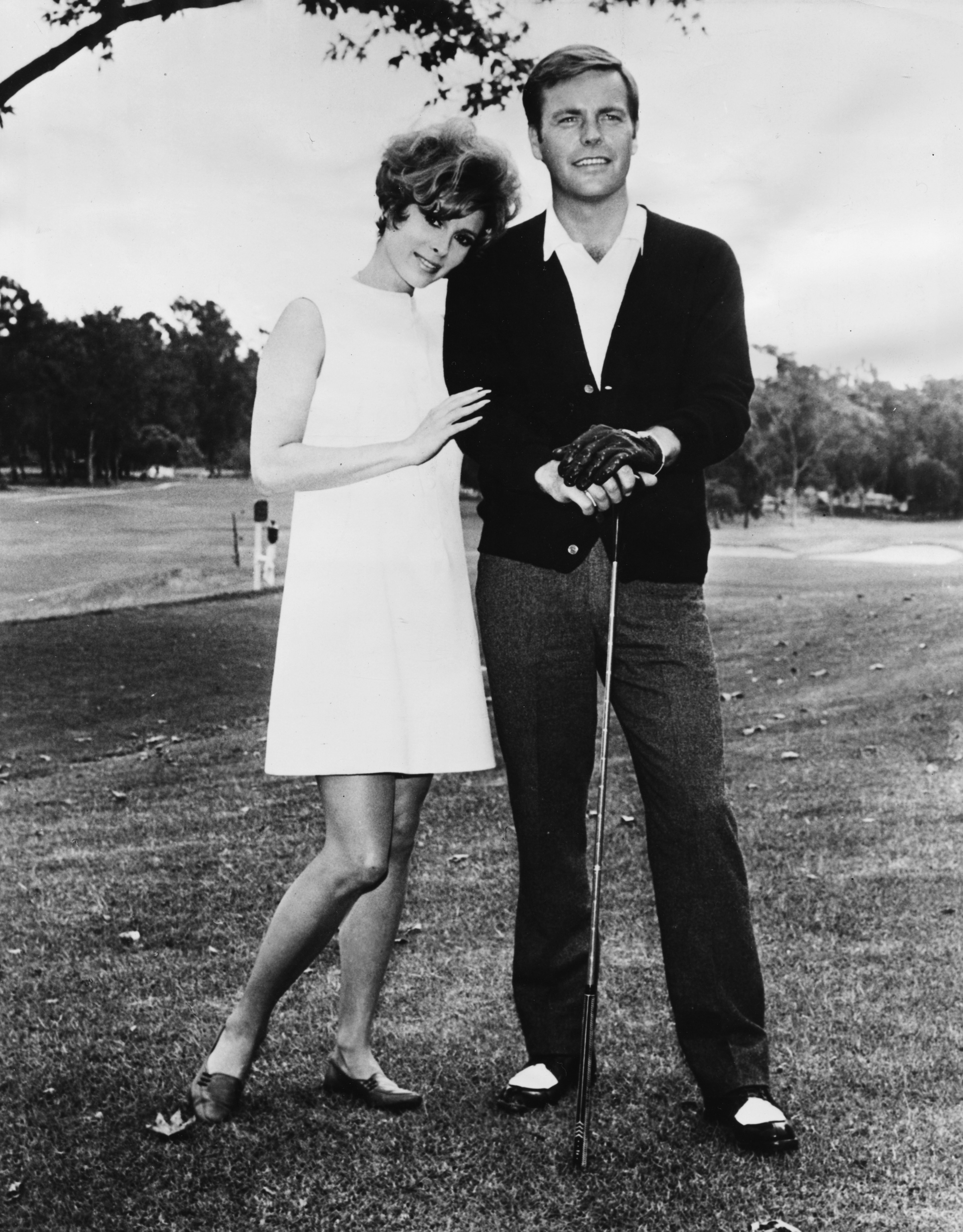
Jill St. John and Robert Wagner

- Robert Wagner as Mike Banning
- Anjanette Comer as Carol Lindquist
- Jill St. John as Angela Barr
- Guy Stockwell as Jonathan Linus
- James Farentino as Chris Patton
- Susan Clark as Cynthia Linus
- Howard St. John as J. Pallister Young
- Mike Kellin as Harry Kalielle
- Gene Hackman as Tommy Del Gaddo
- Sean Garrison as Richard Tyson
- Logan Ramsey as Doc Brewer
- Edmon Ryan as Stuart Warren
- Oliver McGowan as Senator Brady
- Lucille Meredith as Maggi Andrews
- William Cort as Tony (as Bill Cort)

== Reception ==
Howard Thompson of The New York Times called it "unusual, but noticeably unimpressive".

In a retrospective, John Kirk called the film "a wonderful time capsule of the 1960s," despite finding that "some of its attitudes and dialogue hasn’t aged well," but there was "plenty to enjoy."

== Legacy ==
The song "The Eyes of Love," with music by Quincy Jones and lyrics by Bob Russell, was nominated for an Academy Award for Best Original Song.

== Home media ==
Banning was released via a region-free Blu-ray on August 28, 2024, by Australian label 'IMPRINT Films/ViaVision', in association with Universal Pictures. The disc utilized a 2K resolution scan of an interpositive. Imprint advertised Banning as one of their limited edition releases with 1,500 copies for sale.

== See also ==
- List of American films of 1967
