= A Guide for the Married Man =

1967 film by Gene Kelly

- Theatrical release poster
- Directed by: Gene Kelly
- Screenplay by: Frank Tarloff
- Based on: A Guide for the Married Man, as Told to Frank Tarloff; 1967 novel by Frank Tarloff
- Produced by: Frank McCarthy
- Starring: Walter Matthau; Robert Morse; Inger Stevens; Sue Ane Langdon; Claire Kelly; Elaine Devry
- Cinematography: Joseph MacDonald
- Edited by: Dorothy Spencer
- Music by: John Williams
- Distributed by: 20th Century-Fox
- Release date: May 25, 1967
- Running time: 89 minutes
- Country: United States
- Language: English
- Budget: $3.3 million
- Box office: $5 million (US/ Canada)

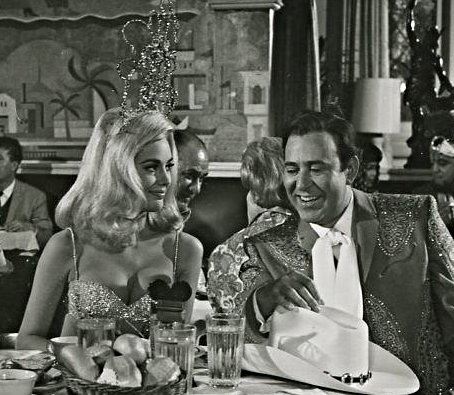
Linda Harrison and Carl Reiner

A Guide for the Married Man is a 1967 American bedroom-farce comedy film directed by Gene Kelly and starring Walter Matthau, Inger Stevens, and Robert Morse. It features many cameos, including those by Lucille Ball, Jack Benny, Terry-Thomas, Jayne Mansfield, Sid Caesar, Carl Reiner, Joey Bishop, Art Carney, and Wally Cox. The title song, performed by the Turtles, was composed by John Williams, with lyrics by Leslie Bricusse.

== Plot ==
Paul Manning, a successful suburban investment counselor, lives a comfortable and financially secure life with his beautiful, congenial, and perceptive wife, Ruth and their daughter. Despite his happy marriage, Paul finds himself plagued by temptation and a wandering eye, a condition exacerbated by his affluent, mid-century suburban environment. His business is thriving, utilizing a secretary and a pool of eight typists.

The temptation hits close to home when Irma Johnson, a bold woman within their social circle, unabashedly flirts with Paul at a party. Ruth instantly notices the behavior and openly discusses it with Paul later, amusedly pointing out how transparent and obvious Irma is in her intentions.

Paul's friend and neighbor, Ed Stander, a smooth-talking and unrepentant serial adulterer, notices Paul's restlessness and initiates him into a subculture of married men who view infidelity as a sophisticated sport. Ed claims that "the code" grants men total immunity to openly boast about and share their affairs within their inner circle. Over a series of lunches and strategy sessions, Ed lays out a meticulous, corporate-style methodology required to execute a clean encounter without getting caught. Ed's rigorous logistical checklist includes renting secondary vehicles under fake names to avoid detection, scouting anonymous motels outside their social radius (the "hideaway"), utilizing olfactory countermeasures by matching specific aftershaves, and establishing rock-solid corporate alibis to justify leaving the house at night.

To illustrate his points, Ed shares a series of cautionary tales and success stories, presented as comedic vignettes featuring various 20th-century entertainment personalities:

- Rance is a nationally known movie star who targets "Miss Stardust", a new actress recently hired by his film studio. To ensure the young starlet's success and cooperation with their top star, Rance's talent agent explicitly advises her on the logistics, explaining that a private liaison with the famous actor is the surest way to secure her career longevity. To protect Rance's public image and keep the encounter hidden from his wife, the pair execute an elaborate travel strategy: they depart Los Angeles in completely opposite directions, utilizing a complex web of different commercial flight paths and land routes to mask their trail. However, the exact moment Rance finally catches up with Miss Stardust at a remote alpine ski villa, his wife and a team of photographers instantly ambush him with flashing camera bulbs before the affair can even be consummated.
- A stingy husband avoids a messy confrontation by using his legendary real-life cheapskate persona, fabricating a tale of financial ruin to persuade his mistress to voluntarily pack her bags, allowing him to immediately pick up his next companion waiting in the car.
- A reckless husband breaks the cardinal rule by bringing his mistress into his marital home. When they lose her uniquely proportioned brassiere, he undergoes a frantic, heart-stopping room sweep that literally turns his hair completely white from panic, noted when Ed introduced him later to Paul.
- A brazen husband masterfully employs psychological warfare against his wife. When caught red-handed in the marital bed, he executes a relentless strategy of "deny, deny, deny", successfully gaslighting his wife into believing she is hallucinating until she apologizes to him.

As Paul absorbs these lessons, he begins to actively plan his first affair, targeting Jocelyn, a dark-haired, attractive new client who recently came to his financial planning firm. Paul successfully orchestrates the rendezvous and drives Jocelyn to the hideaway motel. However, once inside the room, reality sets in. As Jocelyn casually strips down to a corset, Paul becomes completely paralyzed by guilt and discomfort. Instead of embracing the moment, an anxious Paul can only talk about his wife, Ruth, inadvertently praising her virtues to his erstwhile paramore, while visibly uncomfortable with actually going through with the act.

Before the encounter can go any further, Paul and Jocelyn are suddenly interrupted by a chaotic commotion and shouting coming from the motel room right next door. Looking out the window, Paul witnesses a massive ambush: his friend Ed used Paul's hideaway and has been caught red-handed in bed with none other than Irma Johnson, raided by private investigators bursting into the room to document the cheating with an onslaught of flashing camera bulbs.

Witnessing Ed's catastrophic personal and legal ruin unfolding just feet away, Paul is thoroughly shaken out of his trance. Realizing that the psychological, moral, and logistical toll of infidelity completely destroys a man's peace of mind—and knowing how sharp his own wife is—he rejects the toxic logic of the suburban swinging lifestyle. Terrified of a similar fate, Paul hastily ushers Jocelyn out of the motel room, drives her back to her parked car, and unceremoniously dumps her off at her vehicle before speeding away.

Paul runs straight home to climb into bed with Ruth, recognizing that he already has everything he needs. In the final scene, Paul returns to his thriving investment business. Symbolizing his total reformation, he physically turns his back on his secretary during dictation and refuses to take the elevator to avoid encountering his female clerical staff, having completely opted out of the cheating network.

== Cast ==
- Walter Matthau as Paul Manning
- Inger Stevens as Ruth Manning
- Sue Ane Langdon as Irma Johnson
- Robert Morse as Ed Stander
- Elaine Devry as Jocelyn
- Jackie Joseph as Janet Brophy
- Aline Towne as Mousey Man's Wife
- Claire Kelly as Harriet Stander
- Eve Brent as Joe X's Blowsy Blonde
- Marvin Brody as Taxi Driver
- Jackie Russell as Miss Harris, Manning's Secretary
- Majel Barrett as Mrs. Fred V.
- Linda Harrison as Miss Stardust
- Chanin Hale as Miss Crenshaw
- Joy Harmon as Party Girl in Bar (uncredited)

=== Cameo appearances ===
- Lucille Ball as Mrs. Joe X
- Jack Benny as Ollie "Sweet Lips"
- Polly Bergen as Clara Brown
- Joey Bishop as Charlie
- Ben Blue as Shoeless
- Sid Caesar as Man at Romanoff's
- Art Carney as Joe X
- Wally Cox as Man Married 14 Years
- Ann Morgan Guilbert as Charlie's Wife
- Jeffrey Hunter as Mountain Climber
- Marty Ingels as Meat Eater
- Sam Jaffe as Shrink
- Jayne Mansfield as Girl with Harold
- Hal March as Man Who Loses Coat
- Louis Nye as Irving, House Buyer
- Carl Reiner as Rance G.
- Michael Romanoff as Romanoff's maître d'hôtel
- Jason Wingreen as Harry 'Big Fella' Johnson
- Phil Silvers as Realtor
- Terry-Thomas as Harold "Tiger"
- Delores Wells as Girl with Wally Cox
- Heather Young as Girl with Megaphone

== Release ==
According to Fox records, A Guide for the Married Man needed to earn $5,900,000 in rentals to break even, and it returned $7,355,000, resulting in a profit.

== Reception ==
In a contemporary review for The New York Times, critic Bosley Crowther called A Guide for the Married Man "the broadest and funniest farce to come out of Hollywood since the Russians came last year", and wrote:

What is thoroughly disarming and delightful about this mischievous film is the impudent candor of it and its freedom from the leer. Mr. Matthau approaches infidelity with the ingenuousness of a clumsy bull moose, and Mr. Morse assists his intentions with all the wickedness of an imp. The felicities of girl-watching—and there are many of them through the film—are treated with absolute frankness as innocent enjoyment. And Mr. Kelly has directed with speed and persistent wit. "A Guide for the Married Man'' is in the spirit of some of those wonderful old Robert Benchley shorts.

Variety wrote, "Walter Matthau plays a married innocent, eager to stray under the tutelage of friend and neighbor Robert Morse. But this long-married hubby is so retarded in his Immorality (it takes him 12 years to get the seven-year-itch) that, between his natural reluctance and mentor Morse's suggestions (interlarded with warnings against hastiness), he needs the entire film to have his mind made up."

Critic Roger Ebert of the Chicago Sun-Times wrote, "There are a lot of funny people in this movie, but they are not very funny people in this movie, Gertrude Stein might have said. The Casino Royale syndrome has struck again in A Guide for the Married Man, and we are forced to sit and watch as dozens of big-name stars jostle each other for their moment before the cameras."

Pauline Kael of The New Yorker called A Guide for the Married Man "a series of dumb skits", and felt that the famous names in the cast are all wasted: "[W]hat they do is no more memorable than the plugs for brand-name products that are scattered throughout."

== Home media ==
The film was released on DVD on September 6, 2005, by 20th Century Fox Home Entertainment.

== See also ==
- List of American films of 1967
