= E. J. Peaker =

American actress (1944–2026)

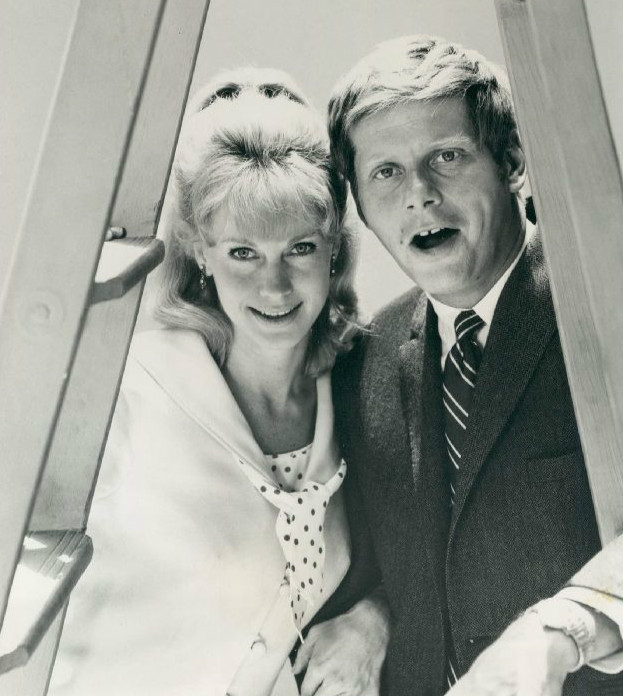
- Peaker with Robert Morse, 1968
- Born: Edra Jean Peaker; February 22, 1944; Tulsa, Oklahoma, U.S.
- Died: May 16, 2026 (aged 82); Las Vegas, Nevada, U.S.
- Occupation: Actress
- Years active: 1964–2001
- Spouse(s): Bob Zampino (m. 1965; div. 1977) Steven Lee Salkin (m. 1977; died 2010) Scott Rosen (m. 2018)

Edra Jean Peaker (February 22, 1944 - May 16, 2026) was an American actress, widely known for her role in the film Hello, Dolly! and in the television musical series That's Life.

== Life and career ==
Edra Jean Peaker was born in Tulsa, Oklahoma on February 22, 1944, and graduated from Centennial High School in Pueblo, Colorado. She attended the University of New Mexico and the University of Vienna for 1 1/2 years each.

On television, Peaker portrayed Gloria Quigley in That's Life, Rose Harris in The Greatest American Hero, and Carla St. James in Madame's Place. She was also a co-host of the syndicated variety series Top of the Month.

Peaker played Minnie Fay in the 1969 film Hello, Dolly!. She was the associate producer of the 1993 made-for-TV film Broken Promises: Taking Emily Back. Peaker made over 50 television commercials, guest-starred on television and appeared in films.

She was married twice, first to film producer Bob Zampino from May 1965 to June 1977 (they appeared on the game show He Said, She Said in 1970), and then to accountant Steven Lee Salko from 1977 until his death in 2010. Peaker lived in Encino, California, where she championed homelessness causes for many years. She later resided in Las Vegas, Nevada, where she died from Alzheimer's disease on May 16, 2026, at the age of 82.

== Selected filmography ==
=== Television ===
- Route 66 .... Olivia Devereaux (1964)
- Occasional Wife .... Ginger Snap ( 1966)
- That Girl .... Sheila (1966)
- The Flying Nun .... Diane (1967)
- Good Morning World .... Genevieve (1968)
- That's Life .... Gloria Quigley (1968)
- Three's a Crowd .... Ann Carson (1969)
- Disneyland Showtime.... Herself (1970)
- The Odd Couple .... Julie (1971)
- Night Gallery .... Nurse (1971)
- Cade's County .... Gerri Randell (1971)
- Banyon .... Jan Shelton (1972)
- Love, American Style (1969–1973)
- Police Woman .... Kathy Brooks (1974)
- Get Christie Love! .... Connie Sawyer (1975)
- The Rockford Files .... Jeannie Szymczyk (1975)
- The Four Deuces .... Lori Rogers, the Songbird (1976)
- Barnaby Jones .... Sheila Wild (1976)
- Most Wanted (1976)
- The Streets of San Francisco .... Beth Herrick (1972–1976)
- Quincy, M.E. .... Michelle Rowan (1977)
- Wonder Woman .... Lois (1978)
- Charlie's Angels .... Donna Dawson (1978)
- The Greatest American Hero .... Reseda Rose Blake (1981)
- Madame's Place .... Carla St. James (1982)
- CBS Schoolbreak Special .... Barbara Kopchek (1987)
- Houston Knights (1988)
- Hunter .... Claire Prossi (1990)
- Out of This World .... Carla (1991)
- Surviving Gilligan's Island .... Natalie Schafer (2001)

=== Features ===
- Hello, Dolly! (1969) .... Minnie Fay
- Getting Away from It All (1972) .... Alice Selby
- The All-American Boy (1973) .... Janelle Sharkey
- Graduation Day (1981) .... Blondie
- Fire in the Night (1986) .... Mary Swanson
- Private Road: No Trespassing (1987) .... Virginia Milshaw
- The Banker (1989) .... Renee
- Dreamrider (1993) .... Mrs. Jennings
- The Last Producer (2000) .... Rosie
