= Ask Any Girl (film) =

1959 film

- Theatrical poster
- Directed by: Charles Walters
- Written by: George Wells
- Based on: Ask Any Girl by Winifred Wolfe
- Produced by: Joe Pasternak
- Starring: David Niven; Shirley MacLaine; Gig Young; Rod Taylor; Jim Backus; Claire Kelly
- Cinematography: Robert J. Bronner
- Edited by: John McSweeney Jr.
- Music by: Jeff Alexander
- Production companies: Metro-Goldwyn-Mayer; Euterpe, Inc.
- Distributed by: Metro-Goldwyn-Mayer
- Release date: May 21, 1959
- Running time: 98 minutes
- Country: United States
- Language: English
- Budget: $1,140,000
- Box office: $3,475,000

Ask Any Girl is a 1959 American romantic comedy film directed by Charles Walters and starring David Niven, Shirley MacLaine, and Gig Young. It was produced by Metro-Goldwyn-Mayer and based on a novel by Winifred Wolfe.

== Plot ==
A wide-eyed Meg Wheeler comes to New York City and takes a job in market research for a large firm. She's also keeping an eye open to meet the right man, her research making her aware that the United States has five million more females than males.

Upon meeting two clients, the reserved and somewhat stodgy Miles Doughton and his playboy younger brother Evan, it doesn't take long for Meg to realize she's romantically interested in Evan.

Miles is willing to help. He has seen so many of his brother's conquests come and go that he knows what Evan likes in a girl. Therefore, in a Pygmalion-like way, he sets out to transform Meg into exactly that kind of girl. What she doesn't yet know is that Miles secretly comes to want her for himself.

== Cast ==
- David Niven as Miles Doughton
- Shirley MacLaine as Meg Wheeler
- Gig Young as Evan Doughton
- Rod Taylor as Ross Tayford
- Jim Backus as Maxwell
- Claire Kelly as Lisa
- Elisabeth Fraser as Jeannie Boyden
- Dodie Heath as Terri Richards
- Read Morgan as Bert
- Carmen Phillips as Refined young lady

== Production ==
MGM bought the rights to the novel in June 1958, before it had been published. David Niven signed to star in November. Jeff Alexander composed the music for the film, with Harry James and His Orchestra releasing two songs from the film, "Ballad for Beatniks" and "The Blues About Manhattan", on an MGM single.

== Reception ==
According to MGM records, the film earned $2,075,000 in the US and Canada, and $1,400,000 elsewhere, turning a profit for the studio of $505,000.

It recorded admissions of 255,797 in France.

== Awards and nominations ==
Shirley Maclaine won the 1959 BAFTA Award for Best Foreign Actress, and also the Silver Bear for Best Actress at the 9th Berlin International Film Festival. She was also nominated for a Golden Globe, losing out to Marilyn Monroe in Some Like It Hot.

Rod Taylor's performance was much admired and helped lead to his casting in The Time Machine (1960).

== See also ==
- List of American films of 1959
