= Robert Morse =

American actor (1931–2022)

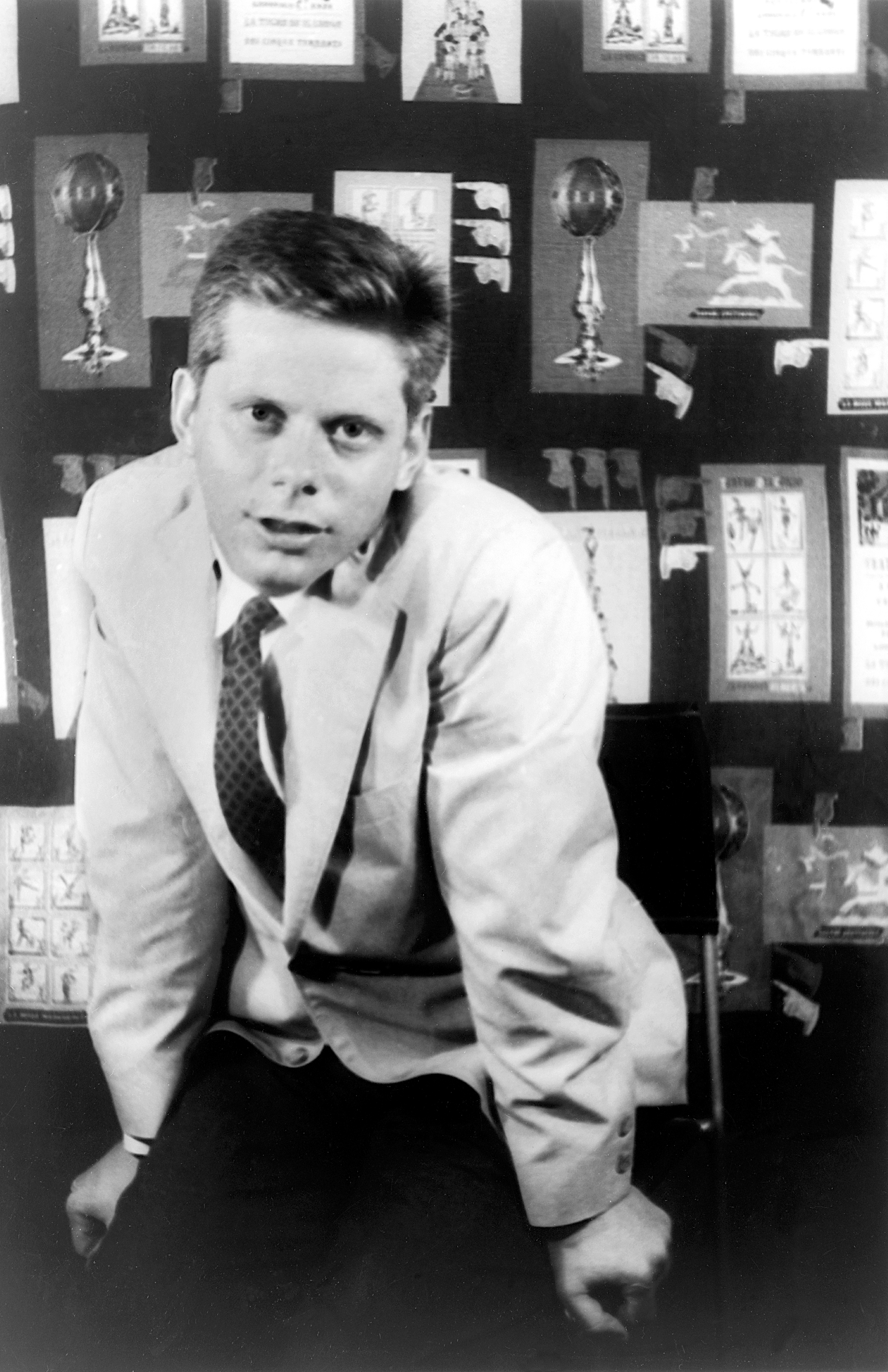
- Morse in 1958
- Born: Robert Alan Morse; May 18, 1931; Newton, Massachusetts, U.S.
- Died: April 20, 2022 (aged 90); Los Angeles, California, U.S.
- Occupation: Actor
- Years active: 1953-2022
- Spouses: Carole D'Andrea (m. 1961; div. 1981); Elizabeth Cosby Roberts (m. 1989)
- Children: 5

Robert Alan Morse (May 18, 1931 – April 20, 2022) was an American actor. Known for his gap-toothed boyishness, he started his career acting in Broadway musicals and plays and then expanded into film and television. For his roles on Broadway, Morse won two Tony Awards; the first for Best Actor in a Musical for playing J. Pierrepont Finch in How to Succeed in Business Without Really Trying (1961), a role he reprised in the 1967 film adaptation; the second for Best Actor in a Play for portraying Truman Capote in the one-man play Tru (1988), a role he reprised in the 1992 television production, earning him a Primetime Emmy Award for Outstanding Actor in a Limited Series or Movie. Morse was also Tony-nominated for Say, Darling (1959), Take Me Along (1960), and Sugar (1973). Morse acted in his final stage role in the Broadway revival of the newspaper comedy The Front Page from 2016 to 2017.

Morse acted in the films The Matchmaker (1958), The Cardinal (1963), The Loved One (1965), and A Guide for the Married Man (1967). Known for his television roles, he played Robert Dickson in the ABC comedy series That's Life (1968-1969), for which he was nominated for Primetime Emmy Award for Outstanding Variety Series, and voiced lead roles in three Rankin/Bass animated productions (1976-1979). Morse attained a career resurgence playing Bertram Cooper in the critically acclaimed AMC drama series Mad Men (2007-2015). The role earned him nominations for five Primetime Emmy Award for Outstanding Guest Actor in a Drama Series. He portrayed Dominick Dunne in the series The People v. O. J. Simpson: American Crime Story (2016).

== Early life ==
Morse was born on May 18, 1931 in Newton, Massachusetts, the second child of May (Silver), a pianist, and Charles Morse, who worked at a record store and managed a theater chain. He was Jewish. He attended a number of different schools until finding his inspiration in Henry Lasker, a music teacher at Newton High School who, according to Morse, "knew what I had burning in me and wanted to express". Upon graduation, he left home for New York City to fulfill his ambition of becoming an actor, joining his elder brother Richard who was already studying acting at the Neighborhood Playhouse, and studied at the Lee Strasberg Theatre and Film Institute. He received an uncredited role in The Proud and Profane (1956), a film starring William Holden and Deborah Kerr. Morse served in the U.S. Navy during the Korean War aboard the destroyer USS Black.

== Career ==
=== 1954-1967: Breakthrough and acclaim ===
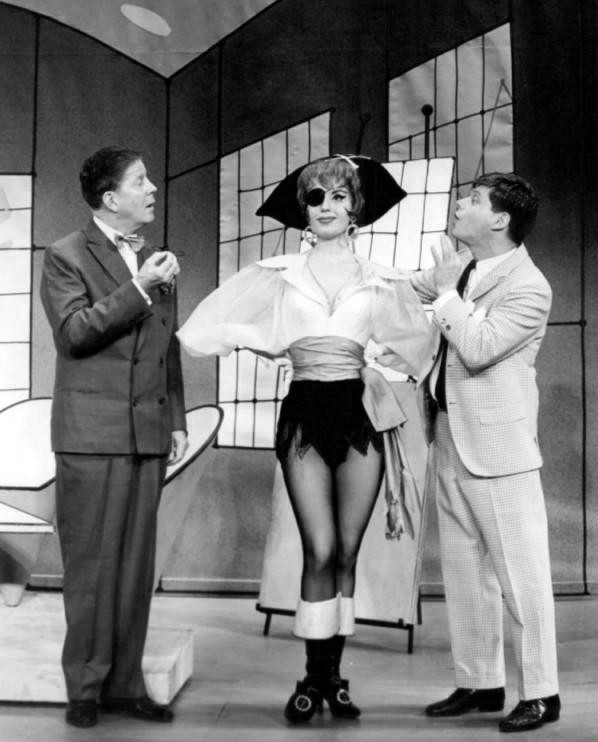
Rudy Vallee, Virginia Martin and Morse in How to Succeed in Business Without Really Trying (1961)

Morse earned multiple nominations and wins for Tony, Drama Desk, and Emmy awards over a period of five decades. He appeared in musicals and plays on Broadway, as well as in films and television shows. Morse made his television debut in the soap opera The Secret Storm in 1954. His first film role was uncredited in the romantic drama The Proud and Profane (1956). In 1955, he made his Broadway debut playing Barnaby Tucker in the Thornton Wilder comedic play The Matchmaker, a role which he reprised in the 1958 film of the same name directed by Joseph Anthony. Morse also played Bobby in the Otto Preminger directed drama film The Cardinal (1963). During this time, he took television roles in The Alcoa Hour, Alfred Hitchcock Presents, Naked City, The Play of the Week, and The Jonathan Winters Show. Morse returned to Broadway playing Ted Snow in the comedic show Say, Darling. Critic John Chapman of The New York Daily News, described Morse's performance as being "splendid". He would go on to receive a Theatre World Award, as well as his first Tony Award nomination for Best Featured Actor in a Play.

The following year, he played Richard Miller in the musical Take Me Along (1959) based on the Eugene O'Neill play Ah, Wilderness!. Morse acted alongside Jackie Gleason and Walter Pidgeon. For his role, Morse received his second Tony nomination, this time for Best Actor in a Musical.

Morse gained stardom for portraying the young 1960s businessman J. Pierrepont Finch in the 1961 Broadway production, Frank Loesser and Abe Burrows musical, How to Succeed in Business Without Really Trying. The production earned raves with New York Times critic Howard Taubman, writing that Robert Morse played Finch "with unfailing bravura and wit", pronouncing Finch, as portrayed by Morse, "a rumpled, dimpled angel with a streak of Lucifer." The production received numerous accolades including the Pulitzer Prize for Drama and seven Tony Awards. He went on to receive his third Tony Award nomination and first win for Best Actor in a Musical. Although he was not named on the award, he contributed to the Grammy Award-winning cast album.

He reprised the role in the 1967 film adaptation of the same name. Bosley Crowther of The New York Times praised the film adaptation, citing it as successfully re-creating "just about everything that was conducive to the stage success." Crowther especially noted his performance, writing "Seeing Mr. Morse in close-ups, as those wily expressions cross on his face and those wicked designs of Pal Joey gleam in his Horatio Alger-character eyes, is better than seeing him on the stage". In 1964, Morse co-starred in the comedy film Quick, Before It Melts. The following year, he appeared in the black comedy film The Loved One, a film based on the Evelyn Waugh novel of the same name which satirized the funeral business in Los Angeles, particularly Forest Lawn Cemetery. In 1967, he co-starred in Gene Kelly's A Guide for the Married Man and in Oh Dad, Poor Dad, Mamma's Hung You in the Closet and I'm Feelin' So Sad, which had been filmed two years previously.

=== 1968–2006: Established actor ===
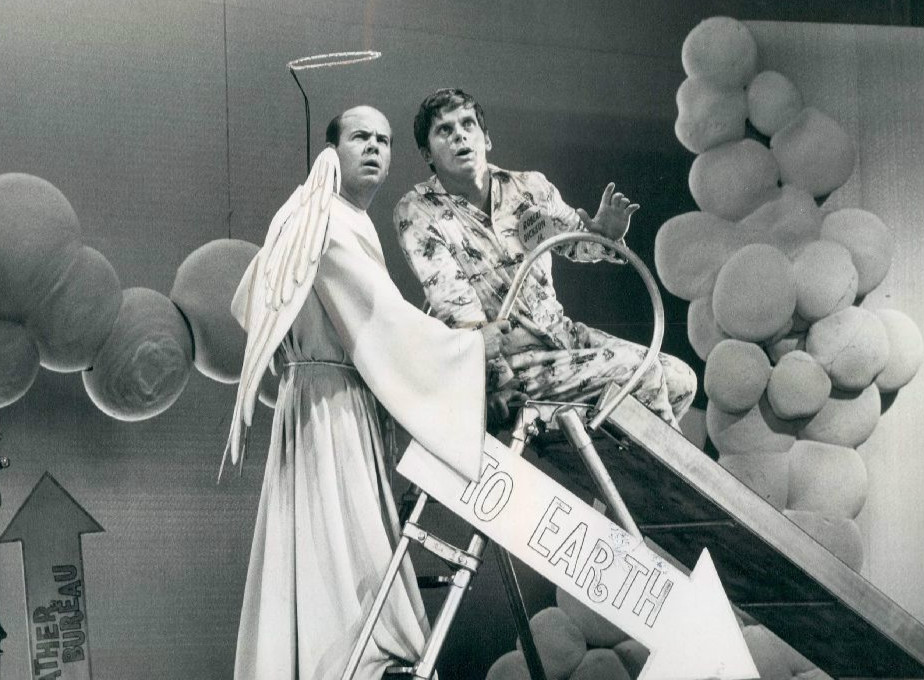
Tim Conway and Morse in That's Life in 1968

In 1968, he appeared in the comedy Where Were You When the Lights Went Out? opposite Doris Day. That same year, he acted in the television series That's Life, which attempted to blend the musical genre with a situation comedy centered on newlyweds "Robert" and "Gloria" (played by E. J. Peaker). The series was nominated for the Primetime Emmy Award for Outstanding Variety Series. Additionally, he guest-starred on The Smothers Brothers Comedy Hour. In 1970, he starred in the lead role in the Walt Disney comedy The Boatniks. Morse didn't appear in another feature film for the next 17 years. During this time, he appeared in episodes of Night Gallery, Love, American Style, and Alias Smith and Jones.

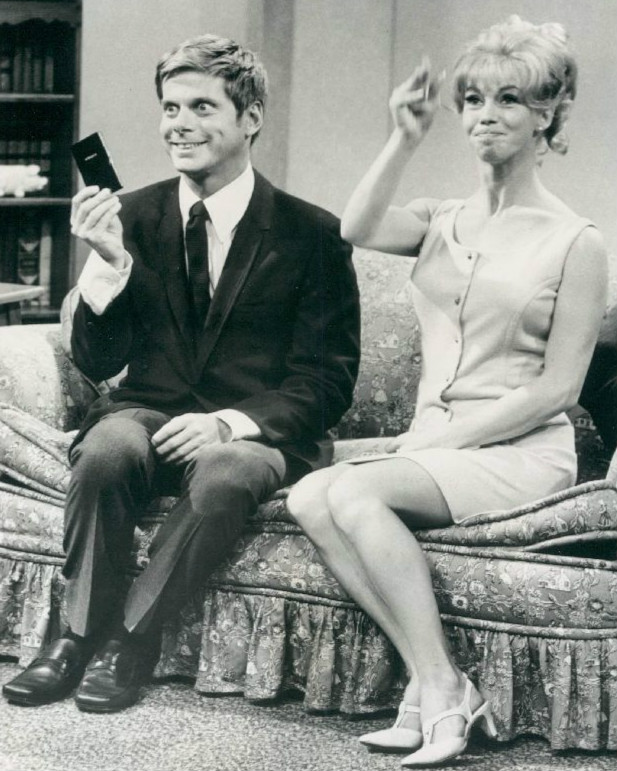
E. J. Peaker and Robert Morse for That's Life in 1968

Morse was in the original Broadway cast of Sugar, a 1972 musical stage adaptation of Some Like It Hot. T.E. Killam of Time "Morse captures the tremor, tenderness, coquettishness and vulnerability of a girl's first love. Morse is an enormously personable stage presence, and he knows it." For the role, he won the Drama Desk Award and was again nominated for the Tony Award for Best Actor in a Musical. Morse joined other performers, including Marlo Thomas, in creating the 1972 Free to Be... You and Me children's album. He provided the voice for the cartoon character Howler in Hanna-Barbera's Pound Puppies. For Rankin/Bass, he voiced Jack in the 1979 animated special Jack Frost as well as the main character Stuffy in The First Easter Rabbit. Morse appeared in dozens of TV shows, including Alfred Hitchcock Presents and The Twilight Zone. He also appeared on CBS Radio Mystery Theater.

He starred in the 1976 musical So Long, 174th Street, which was based on the play Enter Laughing. It received poor reviews and closed quickly, becoming Morse's last Broadway role for more than a decade. In 1987, Morse appeared in the film The Emperor's New Clothes, which starred Sid Caesar and was part of the Cannon Movie Tales series. Morse made his return to Broadway portraying author and socialite Truman Capote in the one man show Tru (1989), earning rave reviews for his performance as well as the Tony Award for Best Performance by a Leading Actor in a Play and the Drama Desk Award for Outstanding One-Person Show. In 1992, he recreated his Tru performance for the series American Playhouse and won the Primetime Emmy Award for Outstanding Lead Actor in a Limited or Anthology Series or Movie. In 1999, Morse was inducted into the American Theater Hall of Fame for his long career as a stage actor.

During the 1990s, he took on numerous voice roles in various animated shows such as Tiny Toon Adventures, Rugrats, Superman: The Animated Series, and The Wild Thornberrys. In 2000, he acted in the drama City of Angels playing Edwin O'Malley. In 2002, Morse was cast as the Wizard of Oz in the San Francisco run of the Stephen Schwartz musical Wicked at the Curran Theatre. Morse quit the show before its Broadway opening, replaced by Joel Grey.

=== 2007-2019: Mad Men and return to Broadway ===
Beginning in 2007, Morse took on a recurring role in the series Mad Men as elder 1960s New York City businessman Bertram Cooper, a founding partner in the advertising agency Sterling Cooper. He was regularly nominated for a Primetime Emmy Award for Outstanding Guest Actor in a Drama Series as a result of his performance in 2008, 2010, 2011, 2013, and 2014. The series creator Matthew Weiner originally cast Morse in part because of his reputation on the stage, including his iconic role as social climber J. Pierrepont Finch in 1962’s How to Succeed in Business Without Really Trying. In his character's final moments, he gets a song and dance number where he sings "The Best Things in Life Are Free". Morse said "It's an absolute love letter from creator Matt Weiner. You couldn't ask for a nicer send off."

In 2016, he played Walter Hoving in the comedic film Donald Trump's The Art of the Deal: The Movie. Morse was cast as journalist Dominick Dunne who covered the 1994-1995 murder trial of O. J. Simpson for Vanity Fair in the series The People v. O.J. Simpson: American Crime Story on FX. At age 85, Morse returned to Broadway in the 2016 revival of the newspaper comedy The Front Page at the Broadhurst Theatre. David Rooney of The Hollywood Reporter described his performance as "delightful". He voiced Santa Claus in Teen Titans Go! (2015-2021), and Teen Titans Go! vs. Teen Titans (2019).

== Personal life and death ==
Morse was married twice and had five children. He died at his home in Los Angeles, California, on April 20, 2022 at age 90.

== Acting credits ==
=== Film ===
| Year | Title | Role | Ref. |
|---|---|---|---|
| 1956 | The Proud and Profane | Casualty (uncredited) | |
| 1958 | The Matchmaker | Barnaby Tucker | |
| 1963 | The Cardinal | Bobby | |
| 1964 | Honeymoon Hotel | Jay Menlow | |
| 1964 | Quick, Before It Melts | Oliver Cromwell Cannon | |
| 1965 | The Loved One | Dennis Barlow | |
| 1967 | Oh Dad, Poor Dad, Mamma's Hung You in the Closet and I'm Feelin' So Sad | Jonathan | |
| 1967 | How to Succeed in Business Without Really Trying | J. Pierrepont Finch | |
| 1967 | A Guide for the Married Man | Edward L. Stander | |
| 1968 | Where Were You When the Lights Went Out? | Waldo Zane | |
| 1970 | The Boatniks | Ensign Garland | |
| 1987 | Hunk | Garrison Gaylord | |
| 1987 | The Emperor's New Clothes | Henry | |
| 2002 | It's All About You | Dr. Flowers | |
| 2012 | The Man Who Shook the Hand of Vicente Fernandez | Burt | |
| 2016 | Donald Trump's The Art of the Deal: The Movie | Walter Hoving | |
| 2019 | Teen Titans Go! vs. Teen Titans | Santa Claus (voice) | |

=== Television ===
| Year | Title | Role | Notes |
|---|---|---|---|
| 1954 | The Secret Storm | Jerry Ames #1 | Season 1 Episode 1 |
| 1955 | Goodyear Television Playhouse | —N/a | Episode: "Man on Spikes" |
| 1956 | The Alcoa Hour | Jiya | Episode: "The Big Wave" |
| 1957 | Matinee Theatre | Frank Wilson | Episode: "Rain in the Morning" |
| 1959 | Alfred Hitchcock Presents | Phil | Season 4 Episode 35: "Touché" |
| 1959 | Play of the Week | Gustave | Episode: "Thieves Carnival" |
| 1960 | Alfred Hitchcock Presents | Len | Season 5 Episode 21: "Hitch Hike" |
| 1960 | Play of the Week | Professor Pearson | Episode: "The Velvet Glove" |
| 1961 | Shirley Temple's Storybook | Drum Carpenter | Episode: "Rebel Gun" |
| 1961 | Naked City | Richy Wilkin | Episode: "Sweet Prince of Delancey Street" |
| 1968 | The Jonathan Winters Show | Self | Episode: 12 (13 MAR 1968) |
| 1968–69 | That's Life | Robert Dickson | 26 episodes |
| 1971 | Alias Smith and Jones | Fred Philpotts | Episode: "The Day They Hanged Kid Curry" |
| 1971 | Night Gallery | Roger Blacker | Episode: "Marmalade Wine" |
| 1971 | Love, American Style | | Episode: "Love and the Ledge" |
| 1974 | Love, American Style | Everett | Episode: "Love and the Forever Tree" |
| 1976 | The First Easter Rabbit | Young Stuffy | Voice, television film |
| 1978 | The Stingiest Man in Town | Young Scrooge | Voice, television film |
| 1978 | Fantasy Island | Barney Shore | Episode: "The Island of Lost Women" |
| 1979 | Jack Frost | Jack Frost | Voice, television film |
| 1982 | All My Children | Harry the Bookie | Episode: "20 July 1982" |
| 1982 | The Good Book | Host / Narrator / Saloon Indian | Television pilot |
| 1983 | Monchhichis | Moncho | Voice, 13 episodes |
| 1983 | One Day at a Time | Frank Sampson | Episode: "Worried Heart" |
| 1983 | Masquerade | —N/a | Episode: "Pilot" |
| 1984 | Calendar Girl Murders | Nat Couray | Television film |
| 1984 | The Fall Guy | Sky Kelly | Episode: "Rabbit's Feet" |
| 1984 | The Dukes of Hazzard | Dewey Hogg | Episode: "How to Succeed in Hazzard" |
| 1984 | Tales of the Unexpected | Stephen Shaw | Episode: "Sauce for the Goose" |
| 1985 | Murder, She Wrote | Marc Faber | Episode: "Broadway Malady" |
| 1985 | Trapper John, M.D. | Honest Wayne McIntyre | Episode: "A False Start" |
| 1985 | The Twilight Zone | Cupid | Episode: "Ye Gods" |
| 1986 | You Again? | Officer Morton | Episode: "The Lush Life" |
| 1986–87 | Pound Puppies | Howler | Voice, 25 episodes |
| 1991 | ProStars | Additional Voices | Unknown episodes |
| 1992 | Tiny Toon Adventures | Goopy Geer | Voice, episode: "Two-Tone Town" |
| 1992 | American Playhouse | Truman Capote | Episode: "Tru" |
| 1993 | Wild Palms | Chap Starfall | 3 episodes |
| 1995 | Aaahh!!! Real Monsters | Dootch | Voice, episode: "Where Have All the Monsters Gone?" |
| 1995 | Here Come the Munsters | Grandpa | Television film |
| 1997 | Rugrats | Mr. Koch, Juggler | Voice, episode: "Faire Play" |
| 1997 | Superman: The Animated Series | DeSaad | Voice, episode: "Father's Day" |
| 1997 | Union Square | Santa Claus | Episode: "Jack Gets a Hot Tip" |
| 1998 | Suddenly Susan | Uncle Bert | Episode: "The Thanksgiving Episode" |
| 1999 | The Wild Thornberrys | Jake | Voice, episode: "Two's Company" |
| 2000 | City of Angels | Edwin O'Malley | 14 episodes |
| 2006 | I Did Not Know That | Nick Rabinowitz | Television film |
| 2007–15 | Mad Men | Bertram Cooper | 58 episodes |
| 2007 | Jeff Ltd. | Ron | Episode: "Too Many Hens in the Foxhouse" |
| 2014 | Sofia the First | Marshak, Gnuckles | Voice, 2 episodes |
| 2014 | The Legend of Korra | Governor | Voice, episode: "After All These Years" |
| 2015–21 | Teen Titans Go! | Santa Claus | Voice, 10 episodes |
| 2016 | The People v. O. J. Simpson: American Crime Story | Dominick Dunne | |
| 2016 | Animals | Old Phil | Voice, episode: "Flies." |
| 2019 | Corporate | Terry Sales | Episode: "The One Who's There" |

=== Theatre ===
| Year | Title | Role | Theatre Venue | Ref. |
|---|---|---|---|---|
| 1955–57 | The Matchmaker | Barnaby Tucker | Royale Theatre, Broadway; Booth Theatre, Broadway | |
| 1958–59 | Say, Darling | Ted Snow | ANTA Theatre, Broadway; Martin Beck Theatre, Broadway | |
| 1959–60 | Take Me Along | Richard Miller | Shubert Theatre, Broadway | |
| 1961–65 | How to Succeed in Business Without Really Trying | J. Pierrepont Finch | 46th Street Theatre, Broadway | |
| 1970 | How to Succeed in Business Without Really Trying | J. Pierrepont Finch | Westbury Music Fair, New York | |
| 1970 | How to Succeed in Business Without Really Trying | J. Pierrepont Finch | The Muny, St. Louis | |
| 1972–73 | Sugar | Jerry | Majestic Theatre, Broadway | |
| 1976 | So Long, 174th Street | David | Harkness Theatre, Broadway | |
| 1978 | Play It Again, Sam | performer | John Drew Theater, Long Island | |
| 1979 | Sugar | Jerry | Starlight Musicals, Indianapolis | |
| 1979 | Sugar | Jerry | The Muny, St. Louis | |
| 1980 | Sugar Babies | Bobby | National Tour USA | |
| 1982 | Where's Charley? | Charley Wykeham | Starlight Musicals, Indianapolis | |
| 1982 | Where's Charley? | Charley Wykeham | Kansas City Starlight | |
| 1982 | Where's Charley? | Charley Wykeham | The Muny, St. Louis | |
| 1984 | Duke | | Cherry County Playhouse, Michigan | |
| 1985–86 | Light Up the Sky | Sidney Black | The Old Vic, London | |
| 1988 | Mike | performer | Walnut Street Theater, Philadelphia | |
| 1988 | Babes in Toyland | The Toymaker | California Music Theatre, Los Angeles | |
| 1989–90 | Tru | Truman Capote | Booth Theatre, Broadway | |
| 1991 | Tru | Truman Capote | Henry Fonda Theatre, Hollywood | |
| 1993 | Show Boat | Captain Andy | North York Performing Arts Centre, Toronto | |
| 1996 | Du Barry Was a Lady | Louis Blore | New York City Center | |
| 2003 | Wicked | The Wizard | Curran Theatre, San Francisco | |
| 2016–17 | The Front Page | Mr. Pincus | Broadhurst Theatre, Broadway | |

=== Video games ===
- Prototype 2 (2012) – Doctor Anton Koening (voice)

== Awards and nominations ==
| Year | Category | Nominated work | Result | Ref. |
Tony Awards
| 1959 | Best Featured Actor in a Play | Say, Darling | Nominated | |
| 1960 | Best Actor in a Musical | Take Me Along | Nominated | |
| 1962 | Best Actor in a Musical | How to Succeed in Business Without Really Trying | Won | |
| 1973 | Best Actor in a Musical | Sugar | Nominated | |
| 1990 | Best Actor in a Play | Tru | Won | |
Drama Desk Awards
| 1972 | Outstanding Performance | Sugar | Won | |
| 1990 | Outstanding Solo Performance | Tru | Won | |
Primetime Emmy Awards
| 1969 | Outstanding Variety Series | That's Life | Nominated | |
| 1993 | Outstanding Lead Actor in a Limited Series or Movie | Tru | Won | |
| 2008 | Outstanding Guest Actor in a Drama Series | Mad Men | Nominated | |
| 2010 | Outstanding Guest Actor in a Drama Series | Mad Men (episode: "Shut the Door. Have a Seat.) | Nominated | |
| 2011 | Outstanding Guest Actor in a Drama Series | Mad Men (episode: "Blowing Smoke") | Nominated | |
| 2013 | Outstanding Guest Actor in a Drama Series | Mad Men (episode: "For Immediate Release") | Nominated | |
| 2014 | Outstanding Guest Actor in a Drama Series | Mad Men (episode: "Waterloo") | Nominated | |
Screen Actors Guild Awards
| 2007 | Outstanding Ensemble in a Drama Series | Mad Men | Nominated | |
| 2009 | Outstanding Ensemble in a Drama Series | Mad Men | Won | |
| 2010 | Outstanding Ensemble in a Drama Series | Mad Men | Nominated | |
| 2012 | Outstanding Ensemble in a Drama Series | Mad Men | Nominated | |
