= Dawson, Texas =

- Town
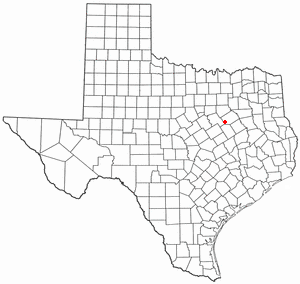
- Location of Dawson, Texas

- Coordinates: 31°53′39″N 96°42′54″W
- Country: United States
- State: Texas
- County: Navarro

Area
  - Total: 1.80 sq mi (4.67 km^{2})
  - Land: 1.78 sq mi (4.62 km^{2})
  - Water: 0.015 sq mi (0.04 km^{2})
- Elevation: 482 ft (147 m)

Population (2020)
  - Total: 815
  - Density: 457/sq mi (176/km^{2})
- Time zone: UTC-6 (Central (CST))
  - Summer (DST): UTC-5 (CDT)
- ZIP code: 76639
- Area code: 254
- FIPS code: 48-19420
- GNIS feature ID: 2412409
- Website: https://www.cityofdawsontx.com/

Historical population
Census	Pop.	Note	%±
1890	365		—
1910	803		—
1920	950		18.3%
1930	1,131		19.1%
1940	1,155		2.1%
1950	1,107		−4.2%
1960	911		−17.7%
1970	848		−6.9%
1980	747		−11.9%
1990	766		2.5%
2000	852		11.2%
2010	807		−5.3%
2020	815		1.0%
U.S. Decennial Census; 2020 Census

Dawson is a town in Navarro County, in the U.S. state of Texas. Its population was 815 at the 2020 census.

== History ==
The town was established in 1847 and was the second town established in the county.

== Geography ==
According to the United States Census Bureau, the town has a total area of 1.8 sq mi (4.7 km^{2}), of which 0.56% (about 6.5 acres) is covered by water.

=== Climate ===
The climate in this area is characterized by hot, humid summers and generally mild to cool winters. According to the Köppen climate classification, Dawson has a humid subtropical climate,Cfa on climate maps.

== Demographics ==
As of the census of 2000, 852 people, 361 households, and 229 families were residing in the town. The population density was 480.8 inhabitants per square mile (185.6/km^{2}). The 408 housing units averaged 230.2 per square mile (89.0/km^{2}). The racial makeup of the town was 80.99% White, 15.14% African American, 0.12% Native American, 0.12% Asian, 1.64% from other races, and 2.00% from two or more races. Hispanics or Latinos of any race were 6.34% of the population.

Of the 361 households, 25.2% had children under 18 living with them, 46.8% were married couples living together, 13.0% had a female householder with no husband present, and 36.3% were not families. About 34.6% of all households were made up of individuals, and 23.0% had someone living alone who was 65 or older. The average household size was 2.36, and the average family size was 3.07.

In the town, the population was distributed as 24.1% under 18, 7.6% from 18 to 24, 23.9% from 25 to 44, 21.7% from 45 to 64, and 22.7% who were 65 or older. The median age was 40 years. For every 100 females, there were 90.6 males. For every 100 females 18 and over, there were 81.2 males.

The median income for a household in the town was $25,658 and for a family was $40,441. Males had a median income of $30,250 versus $20,417 for females. The per capita income for the town was $13,190. About 13.2% of families and 20.9% of the population were below the poverty line, including 27.8% of those under 18 and 27.1% of those 65 or over.

== Education ==
The Town of Dawson is served by the Dawson Independent School District.

== Braniff Flight 352 ==
Braniff Flight 352 was a scheduled domestic flight from William P. Hobby Airport in Houston, Texas, to Love Field in Dallas. On May 3, 1968, a Lockheed L-188A Electra flying on the route, registration N9707C, broke up in midair and crashed near Dawson, Texas, after flying into a severe thunderstorm. It was carrying a crew of five and 80 passengers. No one survived. Investigation revealed that the accident was caused by the captain's decision to penetrate an area of heavy weather followed by a structural overstress and failure of the airframe while attempting recovery from loss of control during a steep 180° turn executed in an attempt to escape the weather.

== Notable people ==
- Anjanette Comer, actress
- Lester Roloff, Independent Baptist evangelist and controversial teen group home operator
