= Sol C. Siegel =

American film producer (1903–1982)

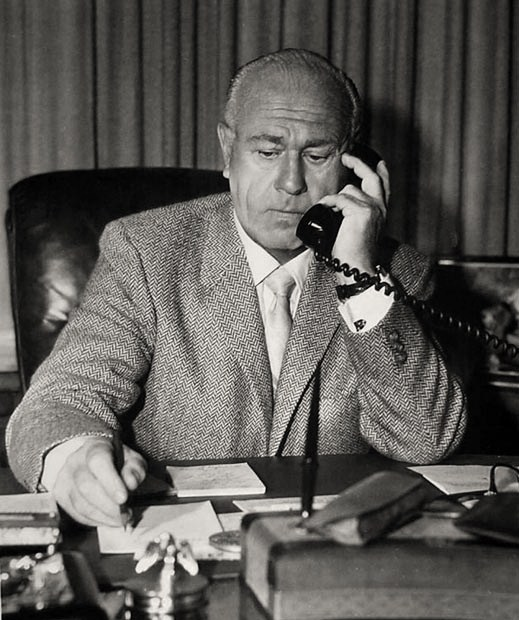
- Siegel in 1958
- Born: March 30, 1903; Kalvarija, Russian Empire
- Died: December 29, 1982 (aged 79); Los Angeles, California, U.S.
- Resting place: Hillside Memorial Park Cemetery
- Education: Columbia University Graduate School of Journalism
- Occupation: Film producer
- Years active: 1934–1968
- Spouses: Ruth E. Shor (m. 1932; died 1962) Helen J. Waite (m. 1972)
- Children: 3

Sol C. Siegel (March 30, 1903 – December 29, 1982) was an American film producer. Two of the numerous films he produced, A Letter to Three Wives (1949) and Three Coins in the Fountain (1954), were nominated for the Academy Award for Best Picture.

== Early life and career ==
Sol C. Siegel was born on March 30, 1903, to a Jewish family in Kalvarija, Lithuania (at the time part of the Russian Empire). In the early 1930s, Siegel was sales manager of the Brunswick-Columbia record label. In 1934, he began his Hollywood career by assisting his brother, Moe Siegel, with the merger of six small production studios into Republic Pictures. He stayed on at Republic as an executive producer, working with Gene Autry and John Wayne.

Sol C.Siegel was born March 30 or 31st (local records lost during WWII) in Kalvarija, Poland, now Lithuania.

During a contract dispute between Republic Studios and Gene Autry Mr. Siegel brought in a member of a singing group called "The Sons of the Pioneers", whose name was Leonard Slye, and changed his screen name to Roy Rogers.

== Producer ==
In October 1940, Siegel left his position as head of Republic Studios to be a producer at Paramount Pictures.

In 1946, he moved to 20th Century Fox. Two of the films he produced there, A Letter to Three Wives (1949) and Three Coins in the Fountain (1954), were nominated for the Academy Award for Best Picture. He also produced The Iron Curtain (1948) and later the Marilyn Monroe musical Gentlemen Prefer Blondes, as well as the star-studded High Society for Metro-Goldwyn-Mayer starring Frank Sinatra, Grace Kelly, Bing Crosby, and Louis Armstrong.

== MGM ==
In 1956, Siegel joined Metro-Goldwyn-Mayer. Towards the end of the year, Dore Schary was fired as head of production and Siegel was rumoured to be given his job. However Ben Thau got the job and Siegel remained a producer, making Les Girls, Man on Fire, Merry Andrew, and Some Came Running.

Siegel was appointed head of studio operations at MGM for three years in April 1958. The following month he was appointed vice president in charge of production. By this stage, the studio had already greenlit a number of movies that would go on to be major successes, including Ben-Hur and North by Northwest. As part of the deal, MGM bought Siegel's company for over $1 million.

During Siegel's time, MGM produced the major Cinerama epic How the West Was Won. He was also the subject of an extortion attempt.

The success of Ben-Hur encouraged Siegel to authorize a series of remakes at MGM such as Cimarron, Four Horsemen of the Apocalypse, and Mutiny on the Bounty. The idea was to re-release these films every seven years, the way MGM did with Gone with the Wind.

In August 1961 Siegel said his formula at MGM was "old hands plus young faces". His key producers at the studio around this time were John Houseman, Arthur Freed, Joseph Pasternak, Pandro Berman and Laurence Weingarten. The following month Siegel announced MGM was "in its strongest position in history from the standpoint of big scale product" adding "it has taken us several years to attain this momentum." Sixteen films were completed and ready for distribution, including King of Kings and Four Horsemen of the Apocalypse, along with Bridge to the Sun, Thunder of Drums, Bachelor in Paradise and Light in the Piazza. Filming was taking place on Mutiny on the Bounty, How the West Was Won, The Wonderful World of the Brothers Grimm, Sweet Bird of Youth, A Very Private Affair, I Thank a Fool, All Fall Down and The Horizontal Lieutenant. Filming was about to start on Billy Rose's Jumbo, Two Weeks in Another Town, and Swordsman of Siena, and projects planned (not all of which were ultimately filmed) included Boys' Night Out, Damon and Pythias, Seven Seas to Calais, Rififi in Tokyo, The Tartars, Period of Adjustment, The Travels of Jaimie McPheeters (which became a TV series), The Rise and Fall of the Third Reich (eventually adapted for TV), The Prize, The Courtship of Eddie's Father, George Bradshaw's It's Only a Paper Moon, Over the Rainbow, Guns in the Afternoon (released as Ride the High Country), Peter Matthiessen's Raditzer, Rona Jaffe's Away from Home, John Steinbeck's Winter of Our Discontent, Franz Werfel's The Forty Days of Musa Dagh and a sequel to Seven Brides for Seven Brothers.

However a number of Siegel films were flops with Four Horsemen and Mutiny being particularly expensive box office failures. This led to Siegel being replaced as head of production in January 1962 by Robert M. Weitman.

=== Independent producer ===
Siegel then began working as an independent producer. He ran his own production company from 1964 to 1967.

Siegel died of a heart attack in Los Angeles on December 29, 1982, aged 79.

== Personal life ==
He was married to Ruth (Shor) Siegel until her death in 1962; together they had three sons, Andrew, Norman, and Richard.

== Selected filmography as producer ==
- The Iron Curtain (1948) - 20th Century Fox
- A Letter to Three Wives (1949) - 20th Century Fox
- Gentlemen Prefer Blondes (1953) - 20th Century Fox
- Three Coins in the Fountain (1954) - 20th Century Fox
- High Society (1956) - MGM
- Man on Fire (1957) - MGM
- Les Girls (1957) - MGM
- Merry Andrew (1958) - MGM
- Some Came Running (1959) - MGM
- The World, the Flesh and the Devil (1959) - MGM
- Home From the Hill (1960) - MGM
- Walk Don't Run (1966) - Columbia
- Alvarez Kelly (1966) - Columbia
- No Way to Treat a Lady (1968) - Paramount

== Filmography as head of MGM ==
Includes MGM profits/losses based on Eddie Mannix ledger:

- Ben Hur (1959) (November 1959) - profit of $20,409,000
- The Wreck of the Mary Deare (November 1959) - profit of $200,000
- Never So Few (December 1959) - loss of $1,155,000
- The Gazebo (December 1959) - profit of $628,000
- The Last Voyage (February 1960) - loss of $551,000
- Home from the Hill (March 1960) - loss of $122,000
- Please Don't Eat the Daisies (March 1960) - profit of $1,842,000
- Platinum High School (May 1960) - loss of $270,000
- The Day They Robbed the Bank of England (May 1960) - loss of $57,000
- The Gallant Hours (June 1960)
- The Subterraneans - loss of $1,311,000
- The Adventures of Huckleberry Finn (August 1960) - loss of $99,000
- The Time Machine (August 1960) - profit of $245,000
- All the Fine Young Cannibals (September 1960) - loss of $1,108,000
- Key Witness (October 1960) - loss of $496,000
- BUtterfield 8 (November 1960) - profit of $1,857,000
- Cimarron (December 1960) - loss of $3,618,000
- The Village of the Damned (December 1960) - profit of $860,000
- Where the Boys Are (December 1960)
- Go Naked in the World (March 1961) - loss of $1,462,000
- The Green Helmet (1961) - profit of $124,000
- Atlantis, the Lost Continent (May 1961)
- Two Loves (June 1961) - loss of $1,773,000
- The Honeymoon Machine (August 1961) - profit of $122,000
- Ada (August 1961) - loss of $2,372,000
- A Thunder of Drums (September 1961) - loss of $42,000
- Bridge to the Sun (August 1961)
- King of Kings (October 1961) - profit of $1,621,000
- Bachelor in Paradise (November 1961) - lost $344,000
- Four Horsemen of the Apocalypse (February 1962) - loss of $5,853,000
- Light in the Piazza (February 1962) - loss of $472,000
- Sweet Bird of Youth (March 1962) - loss of $627,000
- All Fall Down (April 1962) - loss of $1,048,000
- The Tartars (June 1962) - profit of $34,000
- Damon and Pythias (1962) - profit of $6,000
- Boys' Night Out (June 1962) - loss of $262,000
- The Wonderful World of the Brothers Grimm (August 1962)
- Two Weeks in Another Town (August 1962) - loss of $2,969,000
- I Thank a Fool (Sept 1962) - lost $1,207,000
- Period of Adjustment (October 1962) - profit of $558,000
- Mutiny on the Bounty (November 1962) - loss at least $10 million
- How the West Was Won (November 1962) - grossed over $50 million worldwide
- Billy Rose's Jumbo (December 1962) - loss of $3,956,000
- In the Cool of the Day (March 1963)
- The Travels of Jaimie McPheeters (1963) (TV series)

=== Unmade films ===
- adaptation of The Martian Chronicles by Ray Bradbury
- And Seven from America about the Olympic Games
- adaptation of The Alligators by Molly Kazan
- The Secret Classroom
- County Fair – drama set against backdrop of harness racing
- Only in America play by Harry Golden
- Charlemagne
- Lady L – film postponed
- The Winter of Our Discontent based on book by John Steinbeck
- Inamorta by Richard Brooks
- The Rise and Fall of the Third Reich based on the book by William L. Shirer
