= Benny Thau =

American businessman (1898–1983)

- Benny Thau in 1954
- Born: Benjamin Thau; December 15, 1898
- Died: July 5, 1983 (aged 84); Los Angeles, California, United States
- Occupation: Businessman
- Known for: MGM Casting Director

Benjamin Thau (15 December 1898 – 5 July 1983) was an American businessman who became vice-president of the Hollywood film studio Metro-Goldwyn-Mayer (MGM), a subsidiary of the Loew's theater chain. From 1928 he was in charge of casting, in the business of discovering and developing talented performers. He was known for his quiet and calming influence with often temperamental stars. Towards the end of his career he was head of the studio from 1956 to 1958.

== Casting director ==
Born to a Jewish family, Thau started his career as a vaudeville booking agent for Keith's and the Orpheum Circuit. He became assistant to Frank Vincent, chief booker for the Orpheum.

In 1927, following the merger of Keiths and Orpheum, Thau joined Loews as a head booker for their theatres, his duties including booking talent for Capital Theatre. In 1932 he joined MGM as a casting director. He worked closely with Louis B. Mayer and Irving Thalberg and eventually became Mayer's assistant. According to Charles Highham, "Mayer's fascination with Thau is hard to understand: Thau was a cold, detached man, who spoke in an almost inaudible whisper. His pallor, rather mousy, dull features and unimpressive physique did not suggest executive power and authority. But apparently Mayer felt that Thau was indispensable in handling "talent," in dealing with recalcitrant employees."

Thau had a pleasant nature and was regarded with affection by many of the workers at MGM, but wielded considerable power. Thau belonged to Mayer's executive team, called "the college of cardinals", along with Eddie Mannix, Lawrence Weingarten and Hunt Stromberg. Thau managed the pool of talent, called by the publicity department "more stars than there are in heaven."

In 1938 Thau, along with other executives, agreed to produce a film version of Erich Maria Remarque's classic novel Three Comrades, but watered down the script to avoid anything that could offend Germany's Nazi government.

George Sidney described Thau as "a very quiet man, a gentle man." He would be brought in to calm down the performers when they got upset. He said, "Benny spoke very quietly. You could almost never quite hear what he said. But he would talk to this one and that one and had the ability to calm things down. A Vanity Fair article by Bob Colacello described Thau in 1949 as a "short, heavyset man with thinning hair", and quoted the biographer Charles Higham as saying "Thau's casting couch was the busiest in Hollywood".

Dore Schary wrote in his 1979 memoirs, "Ben Thau was and is smooth and cool, and in a short time I asked myself, “When will Benny thaw?” He never did."

In 1951, following the departure of Louis B. Mayer from MGM, Thau remained on the MGM executive committee, along with Dore Schary and Eddie Mannix. Thau's primary job was dealing with stars and contracting. Schary later recalled:

During the remaining years of my term at Metro, I never had the friendship of Ben Thau. To some degree it was my fault... I did not receive what we now call “vibes” of friendliness from Thau. As a result, I stood away from him. I did not quarrel with him but I seldom laughed with him. He was a naysayer. During a year when studios were making a large number of pictures, more pictures failed than succeeded. In some cases, the failures served a purpose in eating up overhead and in a way added to the profits of the successes. But a naysayer had a field day. By acting as Cassandra, he could in time be known as the guy who predicted all of the flops.

== Relationships with the stars ==
Benny Thau was trusted by the stars. For example, Greta Garbo never had a formal contract with MGM. The director and producer Gottfried Reinhardt recalled that at one time Thau explained to Garbo that if she accepted a sizable salary reduction she would move into a lower tax bracket and receive the same net pay. She understood the logic and agreed to the cut on a handshake. When MGM first approached Rosalind Russell for a screen test in the early 1930s she was not enthusiastic, remembering poor treatment at her audition for Universal. When she met MGM's Benny Thau and Ben Piazza she was surprised, as they were "the soul of understanding."

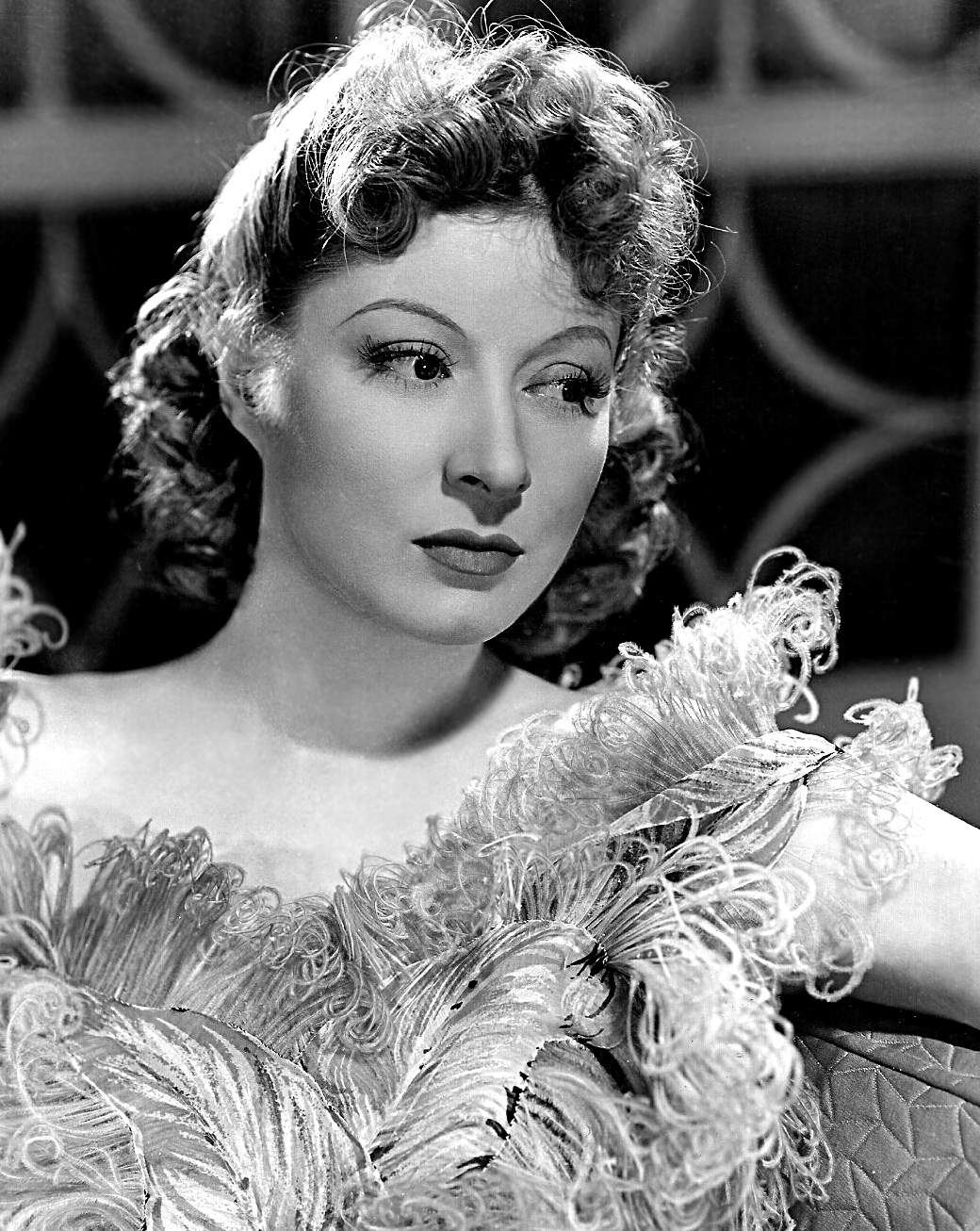
Greer Garson was Thau's mistress during her first years at MGM

During her first years at MGM Greer Garson was Thau's mistress. Thau was a strong supporter of Garson, who received an Oscar nomination in 1941 for Blossoms in the Dust. Joan Crawford, a more established star, was angry that she had not received any recognition, and blamed Thau. She left the studio. However, in 1953 she was surprised to get a call from Thau offering her a starring role in Torch Song (1953).

Elizabeth Taylor was given a role by MGM in Lassie Come Home, and was offered a long-term contract at the beginning of 1943. She chose MGM because "the people there had been nicer to her when she went to audition", Taylor recalled. Benny Thau was to remain the "only MGM executive" she fully trusted during subsequent years, because, according to Alexander Walker, "he had, out of kindly habit, made the gesture that showed her she was loved". He played a key role in Taylor's career, managing her contracts and helping her get what she wanted on each of her films. She said she saw Thau as her surrogate father, and went to him "for help and advice". Thau remembered her as a "little dark-haired beauty ... [with] those strange and lovely eyes that gave the face its central focus, oddly powerful in someone so young." Thau attended Taylor's 1959 marriage to Eddie Fisher.

Thau said of Nancy Davis, the future wife of Ronald Reagan, "I always recommended Nancy for parts. She was sweet and appealing – one of the most popular girls on the lot. Thau escorted Nancy Davis, to many events in Hollywood. This caused gossip about the relationship between the two. Kitty Kelley described Thau as "Nancy Davis's boyfriend", saying he paved the way for her Hollywood career, in her 1991 Nancy Reagan: The Unauthorized Biography.

== Studio head ==
The year 1956 was a turbulent one at MGM, the result of poor financial performances of some of its films, leading to the resignation of long standing president Nicholas Schecnk, eventually replaced in November 1956 by Joseph Vogel. In November Vogel sacked Dore Schary as head of production, a job Schary had held since 1951, also being vice-president since 1948. Vogel said he intended not to have a production head - he wanted a "businessman" like Ben Thau or Eddie Mannix. In December 1956, Thau was appointed as chief of executive staff.

Thau's executive team would include Eddie Mannix, J.J. Cohn, producer Lawrence Weingarten, story editor Kenneth MacKenna, lawyer Saul Rittenberg and Marvin Sehenck, most of whom carried over from the Schary regime. He was not officially a head of production like Dore Schary or Louis B. Mayer had been but more an administrative head, with projects to be driven more by independent producers; this system was closer to how Y. Frank Freeman ran Paramount at the time.

Vogel called Thau "one of the best known executives in the motion picture industry and perhaps one of the least known to the public - quiet and unassuming his name rarely appears in public." Millard Kaufman called Thau " “a nice, nervous man, a nice kind of dumb guy hopelessly unqualified to be a head of a studio.”

The appointment was commonly interpreted as a short term one.

In January 1957, Thau bought the screenrights to Some Come Running. In February MGM signed a deal with Yul Byrnner and Anatole Litvak's company to make The Journey as well as a deal with producers Pandro Berman and Laurence Weingarten to make 12 films through their new partnership, Avon Productions, starting with Don't Go Near the Water and would be followed by Jailhouse Rock. At that stage the studio had Sam Zimbalist, Arthur Freed and Sol Siegel as independent producers, and Edwin Knof, Charles Schnee and Joe Pasternak as independent producers.

In April 1957 Vogel announced that MGM would release 36 films over the next fiscal year for 1957-58. Of these were 15 films for immediate release made under the Schary regime, including Raintree County, Designing Woman, The Vintage, The Little Hut, This Could Be the Night, Something of Value, The Seventh Sin and Man on Fire. Planned films to be made by MGM included The Brothers Karamazov, Cat on a Hot Tin Roof, Gigi, Some Came Running, Ben Hur, The Journey, Jailhouse Kid (which became Jailhouse Rock), Merry Andrew, The Wreck of the Mary Dreare directed by Alfred Hitchcock and The Boyfriend. (The Boyfriend would not be made until 1971; The Wreck of the Mary Dreare was eventually made by Michael Anderson and Hitchcock did North by Northwest for MGM instead.)

In May 1957, Vogel appointed Sidney Franklin to work as Thau's associate. Variety reported "Although a capable administrator, Thau has not generally been considered a creative production executive." His appointment was seen as a sign that Vogel felt it was not necessary for the studio to have a production chief. Vogel has stat

In May 1957, shooting began on Jailhouse Rock, Elvis Presley's third film and his first for MGM. As the producer Pandro S. Berman was busy on The Brothers Karamazov, he let Thau, then head of the studio, and Abe Lastfogel, president of the William Morris Agency, decide the cast.

In 1957 MGM's management faced several take-over attempts led by Joseph Tomlinson, with Louis B. Mayer backing them. In October 1957 these attempts were defeated, although as a result Thau lost his seat on the Loews Board. Mayer died at the end of the month.

Thau took charge of MGM at a point when the studio was in decline and inherited poorly-conceived projects from Schary. Of the twenty films produced in house in 1956–57, all but one lost money, but Thau turned a loss of almost $500,000 in 1957 into a profit of $5 million the next year. By January 1958, the studio’s financial position had stabilised.

That month MGM announced it would make 12 films in the next four months, including Ben Hur, Infamy at Sea, The Tunnel of Love, Imitation General, The Badlanders, and Cat on a Hot Tin Roof. Others greenlit were The Reluctant Debutante, The Journey, Party Girl, The End of the World, Green Mansions, The Village of the Damned produced by Milo Frank (this was later made in England), Company of Cowards produced by Edmund Grainger, Some Came Running, North by Northwest from Hitchcock, The Boyfriend with Debbie Reynolds (this was not made until 1971), Hell Below with Glenn Ford, Devil May Care with Frank Sinatra, High School Confidential, Never So Few from Sam Zimbalist, I Thank a Fool with Ingrid Bergman, and The Bells Are Ringing starring Judy Holliday. Also being prepared was The Artless Heiress, Andy Hardy Comes Home, It Started with a Kiss, The Darling Buds of May (which became The Mating Game), Please Don't Eat the Daisies, Bachelor in Paradise, The Wreck of the Mary Deare, Snob Hill with Debbie Reynolds, The Tentacles, and A Time for Paris with Reynolds. The studio also signed a deal to make two films with Alfred Hitchcock (only one movie would result). Films it was releasing in 1958 were The Brothers Karamazov, Merry Andrew, Gigi, Saddle with Wind, Seven Hills of Rome, Underwater Warrior, The Safecracker, The Sheepman, I Accuse, The Law and Jake Wade, Tom Thumb, Cry Terror, The High Cost of Loving and Handle with Care.

According to an article on MGM in February 1958, "bigger and better pictures is the keynote. Junked as of now are low budget and in-between cost and cast pictures which they feel can be seen for free on TV. The aim is to present attractions which cannot be duplicated on TV." The studio's new contract players included Dean Jones, Gena Rowlands, John Cassavetes and Claire Kelly and at that stage stories were agreed upon by Thau, Eddie Mannix and Kenneth Mackenna. Bud Barry was head of MGM television. The studio was about to start filming on Ben Hur, The Journey, The Reluctant Debutante, Cat on a Hot Tin Roof and Green Mansions.

In April 1958, Thau was replaced as studio boss by Sol C. Siegel, who was appointed as head of studio operations for three years. Siegel also became vice-president in charge of production a month later. Vogel had wanted to hire Siegel at the outset, but they had not come to terms. This was a reversion to the old MGM system.

In September 1958 Thau sold his entire block of Loew's stock - 11,300 shares - leading to speculation he might leave the company. However in October 1958, Vogel declared he hoped that Thau - whose contract with MGM expired on 31 October - would stay on at MGM as administrative head of the studio.

=== Later MGM career ===
After the appointment of Siegel as head of studio, Thau stayed on at MGM as studio administrator, while in June 1958 his assistant Franklin left the studio and was reported to be quitting in a rift. In January 1959 MGM listed the films they would be releasing: The Journey, Night of the Quarter Moon, First Man into Space, The Mating Game, Nowhere to Go, Green Mansions, Ask Any Girl, The World, The Flesh and the Devil, Watusi, Count Your Blessings, The Big Operator, North by Northwest, The Best Generation, Tarzan the Ape Man, For the First Time, The Scapegoat and The Angry Hills. (The line up for 1959-60 was Bells Are Ringing, Never So Few, Strike Heaven on the Face, Say It With Music, Lady L, Travels with Jamie McPheeter, The Elsie Janis Story, Home from the Hill, Please Don't Eat the Daisies, The Wreck of the Mary Dreare, Cimarron, I Thank a Fool, Bridge to the Sun and It Started with a Kiss.

Thau signed a new long term contract with MGM as head of administration in March 1959. Jean Negulesco called him "head of contracts". He was paid $182,000 a year, making him one of the highest paid executives in Hollywood.

== Post MGM ==
Thau left MGM when his contract expired on 1 June 1962. He was not replaced, his responsibilities going to others.

In December 1962 Thau went to work for the William Morris Agency as a top executive. In August 1963 Thau left the agency to become a vice president at Cinerama. Reporting this, Variety called Thau "a well known savvy individual in packaging and dealmaking."

Thau returned to MGM in 1966 as a producer.

== Personal life ==
Thau and his wife Elizabeth Jane White (m 1955) had a son, Michael, born in May 1957.

Benny Thau died in the Motion Picture Home, Los Angeles, in July 1983, after a crippling heart attack. He had been a patient there for two years and been treated for a series of strokes.

== MGM Films Greenlit Under Thau ==
NB Some films were released after Thau had been replaced by Sol Siegel. Sources:

- Jailhouse Rock - announced April 1957, released Oct 1957 - profit of $1,051,000
- Seven Hills of Rome - released January 1958 - profit of $162,000
- The Brothers Karamazov - announced April 1957, released Feb 1958 - profit of $441,000
- Underwater Warrior - released Feb 1958 - profit of $34,000
- The Safecracker - announced Feb 1957 as The Willie Gordon Story, released March 1958 - profit of $59,000
- I Accuse! - announced Oct 1955, released March 1958 - loss of $1,415,000
- Saddle the Wind - announced January 1958, released March 1958 - loss of $308,000
- Merry Andrew - announced April 1957, released March 1958 - loss of $837,000
- Handle with Care - released April 1958 - loss of $270,000
- Gigi - announced April 1957, released May 1958 - profit of $1,983,000
- The Sheepman - released May 1958 - profit of $976,000
- The High Cost of Loving - released May 1958 - loss of $350,000
- Cry Terror - released May 1958 - profit of $48,000
- High School Confidential - announced January 1958, released June 1958 - profit of $578,000
- The Law and Jake Wade - announced January 1958, released June 1958 - profit of $87,000
- Imitation General - announced January 1958, released Aug 1958 - profit of $1,095,000
- Party Girl - announced January 1958, released Oct 1958 - profit of $454,000
- The Reluctant Debutante - announced January 1958, released August 1958 - loss of $355,000
- Cat on a Hot Tin Roof - announced April 1957, released Aug 1958 - profit of $2,428,000
- The Badlanders - announced January 1958, released Sept 1958 - loss of $373,000
- Torpedo Run aka Hell Below with Glenn Ford - announced January 1958, released Oct 1958 - loss of $195,000
- The Decks Ran Red aka Infamy at Sea - announced January 1958, released Oct 1958 - loss of $273,000
- The Tunnel of Love - announced January 1958, released Nov 1958 - loss of $701,000
- Tom Thumb - announced June 1957 released December 1958 - profit of $612,000
- Andy Hardy Comes Home - announced January 1958, released December 1958 - loss of $5,000
- Some Came Running - announced April 1957, released Dec 1958 - loss of $207,000
- The Journey - announced April 1957, released Feb 1959 - loss of $905,000
- Green Mansions- announced January 1958, released March 1959 - loss of $2,430,000
- Count Your Blessings - released April 1959 - loss of $1,688,000
- The Mating Game - announced January 1958 as The Darling Buds of May, released April 1959 - profit of $1,261,000
- North by Northwest - announced January 1958, released July 1959 - profit of $837,000
- It Started with a Kiss - announced January 1958, released Aug 1959 - profit of $582,000
- The World, the Flesh and the Devil - announced January 1958, released Sept 1959 - loss of $1,442,00
- Ben Hur - announced January 1957, released November 1959 - profit of $20,409,000
- The Wreck of Mary Deare - announced April 1957 to be directed by Hitchcock, released November 1959 -
- Never So Few from Sam Zimbalist - announced January 1958, released Dec 1959 - loss of $1,155,000
- The Bells Are Ringing starring Judy Holliday - announced January 1958, released June 1960 - loss of $1,720,000
- Please Don't Eat the Daisies - announced January 1958, released May 1960 - profit of $1,842,000

=== Announced but made later ===
- The Village of the Damned - announced June 1957 to be produced by Milo Frank - later made in England, released Dec 1960)
- Bachelor in Paradise - announced January 1958, released November 1961
- I Thank a Fool with Ingrid Bergman - announced January 1958, released Jan 1962
- Company of Cowards produced by Edmund Grainger - announced January 1958, released 1964
- The Boyfriend with Debbie Reynolds - announced April 1957, not made until 1971

=== Announced but not made ===
- Devil May Care with Frank Sinatra, - announced January 1958
- A Time for Paris with Reynolds - announced January 1958
- Snob Hill with Debbie Reynolds - announced January 1958
- The Tentacles - announced January 1958
- The Artless Heiress - announced January 1958
