= Jim Hutton =

American actor (1934–1979)

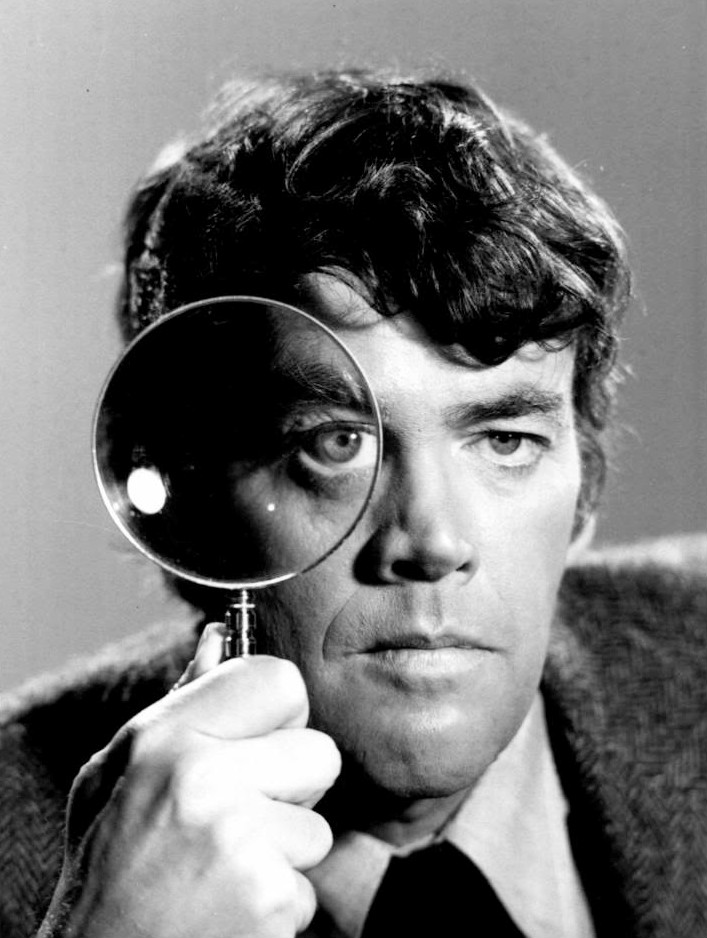
- Hutton as Ellery Queen in 1976
- Born: Dana Scott James Hutton; May 31, 1934; Binghamton, New York, U.S.
- Died: June 2, 1979 (aged 45); Los Angeles, California, US
- Resting place: Cremated: Portion of his ashes interred at Westwood Village Memorial Park Cemetery
- Years active: 1956–1979
- Spouses: Maryline Poole (m. 1958; div. 1963) Lynni M. Solomon (m. 1970; div. 1973)
- Children: 3, including Timothy

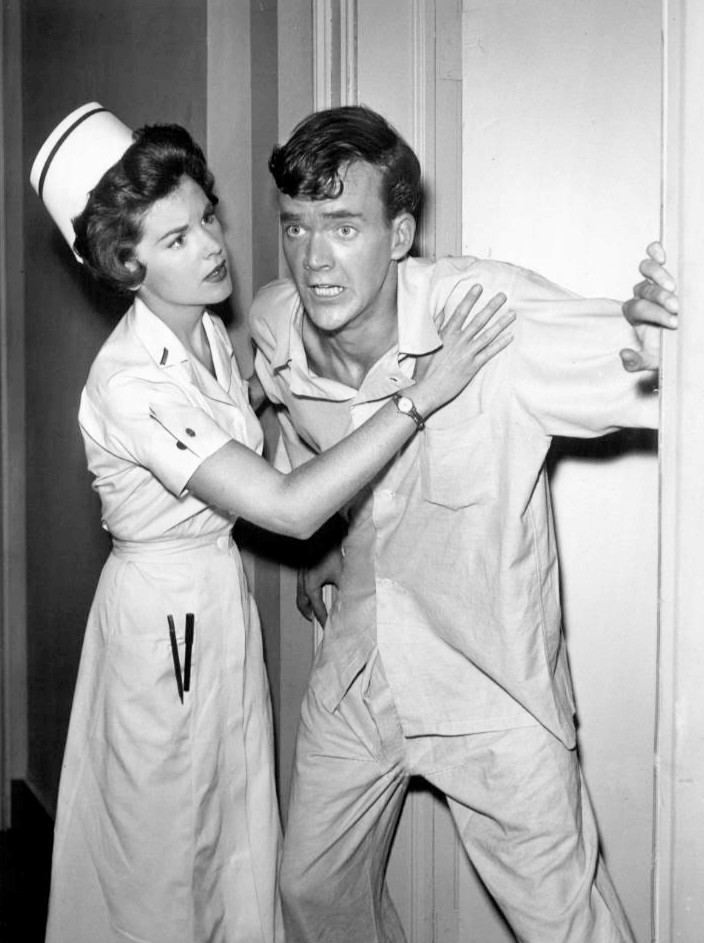
Sue Randall and Jim Hutton in "And When the Sky Was Opened", a 1959 episode of The Twilight Zone

Dana Scott James Hutton (May 31, 1934 – June 2, 1979) was an American actor in film and television best remembered for his role as Ellery Queen in the 1970s TV series of the same name, and his screen partnership with Paula Prentiss in four films, starting with Where the Boys Are. He was the father of actor Timothy Hutton.

According to Stephen Vagg of Filmink, Hutton "seemed on the verge of becoming a star for many years without ever quite getting there... it’s kind of a mystery why it didn’t happen."

== Early life ==
Hutton was born on May 31, 1934 in Binghamton, New York, the son of Helen and Thomas R. Hutton, an editor and managing editor of the Binghamton Press. Hutton's parents divorced while he was an infant, and he never knew his father. In 1938, Hutton and his mother moved to Albany, NY. During his childhood, he enjoyed sports and playing games with his friends. Hutton was expelled from five high schools and a boarding school due to behavior problems, but had excellent grades and test scores. After starting his school newspaper's sports column, he earned a scholarship in journalism from Syracuse University in 1952. He was expelled from Syracuse after driving a bulldozer through a bed of tulips near the library while drunk.

Hutton then enrolled at Niagara University, where he began pursuing an acting career. He performed in summer stock in Connecticut and La Jolla, and won state oratory competitions.

In 1955, he moved back to New York, where he became, in his own words, a "beatnik". He struggled to find acting work. Worried about being able to make ends meet, he joined the military.

== Military service ==
Hutton served in the United States Army from 1956 to 1959, and starred in over 40 Army training films before going to West Berlin to serve in special services. Hutton founded the American Community Theater by spearheading the renovation of theaters abandoned during World War II. He established the first English-speaking theater in Berlin. "They turned out to be the kickiest two years of my life", he later said.

Hutton was performing in live theater in West Germany, playing Captain Queeg in a production of The Caine Mutiny Court Martial, while with the Army, when he was spotted by American film director Douglas Sirk. Sirk offered him a small role in a film, A Time to Love and a Time to Die (1958), if he could get leave to join the unit in Nuremberg. Hutton made his debut in the film as a neurotic German soldier who commits suicide. Universal Pictures saw footage and expressed interest in offering him a long-term contract. While in West Germany, Hutton also had a small role in Ten Seconds to Hell (1959).

When Hutton left the Army, he moved to Hollywood, but discovered the offer from Universal had expired. He got an agent, though, and started doing auditions.

== Acting ==
=== Early television roles ===
One of his earliest roles was on the TV show The Big Attack (1956–57) in episode one, "Big Slim". His first notable screen appearance was in the episode "And When the Sky Was Opened" of The Twilight Zone (1959), in which he co-starred with Rod Taylor. He also guest-starred on episodes of Father Knows Best and Tate.

In 1959, he appeared on stage at the La Jolla Playhouse in Look Homeward Angel alongside Miriam Hopkins.

=== Metro-Goldwyn-Mayer ===
Hutton auditioned for Metro-Goldwyn-Mayer (MGM) executives Al Tresconi and Ben Thau. They were impressed enough to offer him a long-term contract. "But after that, they didn't seem to know what to do with me", he said. "I don't fall easily into a mold and they tried different things."

MGM put him in The Subterraneans (1960), a drama about "beatniks". The film was a big flop, but Hutton was then cast in a teen comedy for the same studio, Where the Boys Are (1960), where he appeared alongside a number of young players under contract to the studio, including George Hamilton, Connie Francis, Yvette Mimieux, and Paula Prentiss. The movie was a huge success.

Due to his tall, gangly frame and the absent-minded quality of his delivery, Hutton was viewed as a successor to James Stewart. Hutton was romantically teamed in the film with Prentiss, in part because they were the tallest MGM contract players of their time (Hutton at 6 ft 5 in [196 cm] and Prentiss at 5 ft 10 in [178 cm]), and public feedback being positive, MGM decided to make them a regular team, along the lines of William Powell and Myrna Loy.

Hutton appeared with Prentiss in The Honeymoon Machine (1961) supporting Steve McQueen, which was a hit. They made Bachelor in Paradise (1961) starring Bob Hope and Lana Turner, which lost money. Hutton and Prentiss were given top billing in The Horizontal Lieutenant (1962), which was a box-office disappointment. "We're not being thrown into films together to play the same parts", said Hutton. "Paula and I have spent too much time and money on our careers, and if teaming together happens to go hand and glove with advancing our careers, then fine." According to Filmink Hutton "was a screen natural: tall, affable, intelligent, slightly gangly, innocent but not dim, with a deep speaking voice, and superb comic timing – he was like a new James Stewart or Jack Lemmon, ideal for boys next door, gawky love interests, and/or junior officers/executives."

Hutton and Prentiss were announced for Away from Home to be shot in Mexico by producer Edmund Grainer, but the film appears to have not been made. Neither was another announced for them, And So To Bed, to be written and directed by Frank Tashlin.

Hutton was meant to play a role in How the West Was Won (1962), a soldier who tries to desert and fights with George Peppard, but Russ Tamblyn ended up playing the role.

In February 1962, Prentiss and Hutton made the exhibitors list of the top 10 "stars of tomorrow" alongside Hayley Mills, Nancy Kwan, Horst Bucholz, Carol Lynley, Dolores Hart, Juliet Prowse, Connie Stevens, and Warren Beatty.

MGM tried Hutton in a comedy-drama with Jane Fonda, Period of Adjustment (1962), directed by George Roy Hill. It was a hit at the box office. MGM announced they would reteam him with Prentiss in Follow the Boys but he was not in the final film; Prentiss' love interest was played by Russ Tamblyn.

Hutton did some stage acting at the La Jolla Playhouse in Write Me a Murder in 1962. He was Connie Francis's leading man in Looking for Love (1964) (in which Hamilton, Mimieux, and Prentiss had cameos). The movie was not a success. He was going to be Sandra Dee's leading man in The Richest Girl in Town but was replaced by Andy Williams for the final film, which became I'd Rather Be Rich.

Hutton, tired of playing in comedies, refused scripts from MGM for 15 months before the studio eventually released him from his contract.

=== Columbia ===
After leaving MGM, Hutton signed a one-year contract with Universal and received an offer to make a Western film at Columbia Pictures, Major Dundee, which was directed by Sam Peckinpah, and Hutton played the third lead after Charlton Heston and Richard Harris, an ineffective officer. Filming took place in Mexico. He followed it with another expensive Western, The Hallelujah Trail (1965) with Burt Lancaster, directed by John Sturges for United Artists. Both films were financial disappointments, although Dundee's reputation has risen in recent years.

Hutton was the male juvenile in Never Too Late (1965) with Paul Ford and Connie Stevens, at Warner Bros.

"The Major Dundee and Hallelujah Trail parts were good", he said in an interview around this time, "but they were peripheral. I'm ready for a take charge part. In all immodesty, I don't believe there are many guys my age who can play comedy. Jack Lemmon is the master, but who among the younger guys can you think of? A lot of them can clown and laugh at their own jokes."

Hutton made a pilot for a sitcom about a travelling salesman, Barney, written and directed by Shelley Berman for Screen Gems, but it was not picked up. He made a cameo in The Trouble with Angels, and was the second male lead in Walk, Don't Run (1966), a comedy with Samantha Eggar and Cary Grant (in Grant's last feature-film appearance) at Columbia. Director Charles Walters noted that Hutton was Grant's personal choice for the role. "Cary identifies with Hutton", he said. The success of this film had Hutton given the lead in Columbia's comedy Who's Minding the Mint? (1967), but it was not widely seen. He was announced for the lead in A Guide for the Married Man but when the script changed, he ended up asking to be released from it.

In November 1966, Hutton signed a nonexclusive, two-year deal with 20th Century Fox. However, he did not appear in any Fox films.

=== John Wayne ===
In July 1967, Hutton signed to appear in the John Wayne war drama, The Green Berets, in which Hutton played a Special Forces sergeant in a mix of comedy and drama, with a memorable booby trap death scene.

In 1968, Hutton appeared with Wayne in Hellfighters, playing the role of Greg Parker. The movie was loosely based on the career of oil-well firefighter Red Adair. Filmink argued around this time "The winds of Hollywood were changing, and Hutton had become unfashionable... in the minds of producers and directors, Hutton was associated with early sixties Hollywood rather than late sixties Hollywood. Because, from then on, he worked almost exclusively on television."

=== Return to television ===
In the early 1970s, Hutton began working almost exclusively in television, guest-starring on such shows as The Psychiatrist; Love, American Style (several times), and The Name of the Game. He was in two TV movies, the thriller The Deadly Hunt (1971) and a war film, The Reluctant Heroes of Hill 656 (1971).

Hutton played Erle Stanley Gardner's small-town district attorney hero, Doug Selby, in They Call It Murder (1971), a TV movie that was a pilot for a proposed series that never came about. He also co-starred with Connie Stevens in Call Her Mom (1972), another TV movie that was a pilot for a series that was not picked up. He tried three failed sitcom pilots, Wednesday Night Out, Call Holme, and Captain Newman, M.D. (the latter, written by Richard Crenna, not to be confused with the like-named 1963 movie).

Hutton starred in Don't Be Afraid of the Dark (1973) and The Underground Man (1974) and episodes of Marcus Welby, M.D., The Wide World of Mystery, and Ironside. His last theatrical film was Psychic Killer (1975) directed by Ray Danton. "Much of my career downfall was my own fault," he said around this time.

=== Ellery Queen ===
Hutton had not auditioned since Period of Adjustment, but agreed to do it for the role of fictional amateur detective Ellery Queen in the 1975 made-for-television movie and 1975–1976 television series, Ellery Queen. Hutton's co-star in the series (set in 1946–1947 New York City) was David Wayne, who portrayed his widowed father, an NYPD homicide detective. Ellery, a writer of murder mysteries, assisted his father as an amateur, each week solving an "actual" murder case. Near the end of each story, before revealing the solution, he would "break the fourth wall" by giving the audience a brief review of the clues and asking if they had solved the mystery. "It's the first opportunity I've had in a long time to show people I can give a good performance," he said. It ran for 23 episodes.

One of Hutton's memorable television appearances was appearing as a guest star in the 1977–1978 third-season premiere of the Norman Lear sitcom One Day at a Time. The episode, titled "The Older Man", was a four-part story arc in which Hutton portrayed Dr. Paul Curran, a 42-year-old veterinarian who falls in love with 17-year-old Julie Cooper (played by Mackenzie Phillips).

=== Final years ===
Hutton's final performances included roles in Flying High, $weepstake$, and The Wonderful World of Disney (The Sky Trap).

His last television role was in an unsold pilot called Butterflies, based on the BBC2 sitcom of the same name. It was broadcast on NBC in August 1979, about two months after Hutton had died.

== Personal life ==
Hutton married a teacher named Maryline Adams (née Poole) in December 1958. They divorced in February 1963. They had two children: a daughter and a son, Timothy. Timothy also became an actor and appeared with his father in a summer-stock production of Harvey. Hutton was married to Lynni M. Solomon from March 1970 to December 1973 when they divorced. They had a daughter. Beginning in 1964, Hutton had an intermittent 15-year relationship with actress and model Yvette Vickers.

== Death ==
On June 2, 1979, Hutton died of liver cancer, two days after his 45th birthday and a month after being diagnosed. He was cremated and his ashes were interred at the Garden of Roses area of Westwood Village Memorial Park.

== Appraisal ==
Filmink argued Hutton "had talent, charisma, affability and appeared in some popular movies" but "didn’t always have the best material and some films that might have taken him to the next level underperformed at the box office" and never enjoyed "a game-changing movie in a different genre that could change the way people thought about him" and "seemed to have particularly poor luck getting a hit TV series (a medium that suited him) or really top flight directors." Furthermore, he "was overly associated with one sort of genre – light comedy – and a particular style of that light comedy – tail end golden era Hollywood, with its glossy photography, contract stars and sexual conservatism. So, his place in modern day light comedy was taken by newer actors."

== Filmography ==
=== Film ===
- A Time to Love and a Time to Die (1958) — Hirschland
- Ten Seconds to Hell (1959) — Workman at Bomb Site (uncredited)
- The Subterraneans (1960) — Adam Moorad
- Where the Boys Are (1960) — TV Thompson
- The Honeymoon Machine (1961) — Jason Eldridge
- Bachelor in Paradise (1961) — Larry Delavane
- The Horizontal Lieutenant (1962) — Second Lt. Merle Wye
- Period of Adjustment (1962) — George Haverstick
- Sunday in New York (1963) — Man in Rowboat with Radio (uncredited)
- Looking for Love (1964) — Paul Davis
- Major Dundee (1965) — Lieutenant Graham
- The Hallelujah Trail (1965) — Captain Paul Slater
- Never Too Late (1965) — Charlie Clinton
- The Trouble with Angels (1966) — Mr. Petrie (uncredited)
- Walk, Don't Run (1966) — Steve Davis
- Who's Minding the Mint? (1967) — Harry Lucas
- The Green Berets (1968) — Sgt. Petersen
- Hellfighters (1968) — Greg Parker
- Psychic Killer (1975) — Arnold James Masters

=== Television ===
- The Twilight Zone (1959) – episode "And When the Sky Was Opened"
- Father Knows Best (1960) – episode "Betty's Career Problem"
- You're Only Young Once (1962) – unsold TV pilot
- Barney (1965) – unsold TV pilot
- Love, American Style – three episodes
  - "Love and Murphy's Bed" (1971) – John
  - "Love and the Small Wedding" (1972) – Robert
  - "Love and the Novel" (1973) – Keith
- The Psychiatrist (1971) – episode "The Private World of Martin Dalton"
- The Name of the Game (1971) – episode "The Savage Eye"
- The Deadly Hunt (1971) – TV movie
- The Reluctant Heroes (1971) – TV movie
- They Call It Murder (1971) – TV movie; District Attorney Doug Selby
- Call Her Mom (1972) – TV movie
- Call Holme (1972) – unsold TV pilot
- Wednesday Night Out (1972) – unsold TV pilot
- Captain Newman, M.D. (1972) – unsold TV pilot
- Don’t Be Afraid of the Dark (1973) – TV movie; Alex Farnham
- Marcus Welby, MD (1974) – episode "The Mugging"
- The Underground Man (1974) – TV movie
- Nightmare at 43 Hillcrest (1974) – TV movie
- Ironside (1974) – episode "The Far Side of the Fence"
- Ellery Queen (1975–76) – TV series; pilot and 22 episodes
- One Day at a Time (1977) – episodes "The Older Man" (four parts)
- Flying High (1978) – pilot
- Sweepstakes (1979) – episode seven
- The Wonderful World of Disney (1979) – episode "The Sky Trap"
- Butterflies (1979) – unsold TV pilot (aired following his death)
