= The Couple Takes a Wife =

1972 American TV film

- Genre: Comedy
- Written by: Susan Silver
- Directed by: Jerry Paris
- Starring: Bill Bixby; Paula Prentiss; Myrna Loy
- Music by: Dick DeBenedictis
- Country of origin: United States
- Original language: English

Production
- Producer: George Eckstein
- Production locations: Universal Studios - 100 Universal City Plaza, Universal City, California
- Cinematography: F. Bud Mautino
- Editors: Bill Brame; Aaron Stell
- Running time: 73 minutes
- Production company: Universal Television

Original release
- Network: ABC
- Release: December 5, 1972

The Couple Takes a Wife is a 1972 American television film. It was directed by Jerry Paris and starred Bill Bixby and Paula Prentiss. It was one of Prentiss' first telemovies. It was broadcast as an ABC Movie of the Week.

== Plot ==
A working couple decides to hire a second "wife" (a woman named Jennifer)--who looks good and works hard around the house--but complications ensue.

== Cast ==
- Bill Bixby as Jeff Hamilton
- Paula Prentiss as Barbara Hamilton
- Myrna Loy as Mother
- Robert Goulet as Randy Perkins
- Nanette Fabray as Marion Randolph
- Larry Storch as David
- Valerie Perrine as Jennifer Allen
- Penny Marshall as Paula
- Ruth McDevitt as Mrs. Flannigan
- Carmen Zapata as Maria
- Bert Holland as Mr. Kaplan
- Helen Kleeb as Miss Robbins

== Reception ==
The show aired in December 1972. It was the 17th highest rated program of the week with ratings of 24.2 and a share of 37.

The New York Times thought it had some "genuine charm" but was "done in by the last half hour." The Los Angeles Times called it "slick, sophisticated."
