= Bachelor in Paradise (film) =

1961 film

- Theatrical release poster
- Directed by: Jack Arnold
- Written by: Vera Caspary; Jack Arnold (uncredited)
- Screenplay by: Valentine Davies; Hal Kanter
- Produced by: Ted Richmond (executive producer, uncredited)
- Starring: Bob Hope; Lana Turner; Janis Paige; Paula Prentiss
- Cinematography: Joseph Ruttenberg
- Edited by: Richard W. Farrell
- Music by: Henry Mancini
- Color process: Metrocolor
- Production company: Metro-Goldwyn-Mayer
- Distributed by: Metro-Goldwyn-Mayer
- Release dates: November 2, 1961; (World Premiere, London)
- Running time: 109 minutes
- Country: United States
- Language: English
- Budget: $1,989,000
- Box office: $3.5 million

Bachelor in Paradise is a 1961 American Metrocolor, CinemaScope romantic comedy film starring Bob Hope and Lana Turner. Directed by Jack Arnold, it was written by Valentine Davies and Hal Kanter, based on a story by Vera Caspary.

It co-stars Janis Paige, Jim Hutton and Paula Prentiss.

The film won three Laurel awards for Best Comedy, Best Comedy Actor (Hope) and song ("Bachelor in Paradise", music: Henry Mancini and lyrics: Mack David), which was also nominated for Academy Award for Best Original Song. Bob Hope was nominated for the Golden Globe Award for Best Actor – Motion Picture Musical or Comedy.

Unusual for an American film, Bachelor in Paradise had its World Premiere at the Coliseum Theatre in London's West End on November 2, 1961, with a personal appearance from Bob Hope (although Hope himself was born in Britain).

== Plot ==
A.J. Niles is a provocative best-selling author who discovers he was ripped off by his accountant, Herman Wapinger, and owes a large tax debt. Under the alias, Jack Adams, Niles goes undercover in a California suburban community called Paradise Village to research a new book about the wives and lives there. Niles is pursued by a flirtatious married woman named Dolores and falls in love with a woman, Rosemary, who rents her house to him. Wapinger is found, Niles' cash is returned to him, and he reveals his true identity on national television. Three husbands in Paradise Village file for divorce, believing their wives are having affairs with Niles. In divorce court, Niles reveals that he is in love with Rosemary and asks her to marry him. The divorce suits get dropped, and Rosemary accepts.

== Cast ==
- Bob Hope as Adam J. Niles (Jack Adams)
- Lana Turner as Rosemary Howard
- Janis Paige as Dolores Jynson
- Jim Hutton as Larry Delavane
- Paula Prentiss as Linda Delavane
- Don Porter as Thomas W. Jynson
- Virginia Grey as Camille Quinlaw
- Agnes Moorehead as Judge Peterson
- Florence Sundstrom as Mrs. Pickering
- John McGiver as Austin Palfrey
- Clinton Sunberg as Rodney Jones
- Alan Hewitt as Attorney Backett
- Reta Shaw as Mrs. Brown
- Vin Scully as himself

== Production ==
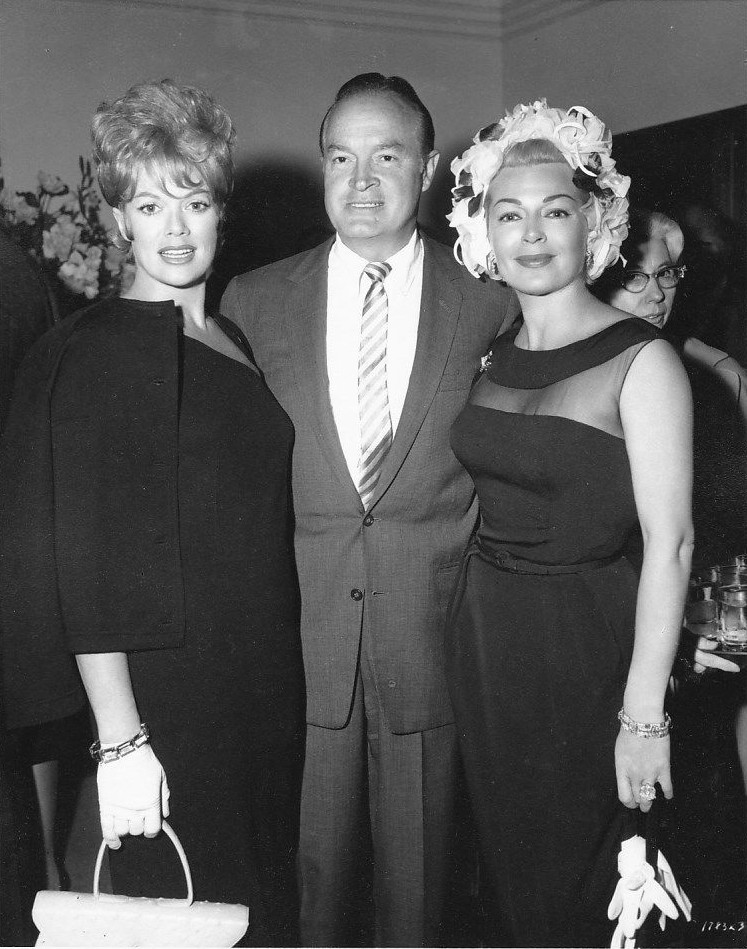
Paige (left), Hope, and Turner at the time of production of Bachelor in Paradise

The script was based on an original story for the movies by Vera Caspary – a 70-page document.

The film was Bob Hope's first with MGM. He was persuaded to star in it by head of production Sol Siegel. The film marked Lana Turner's first romantic comedy in a number of years, and her only time returning to film at MGM since her long-term original contract with that studio ended in 1956.

George Marshall was originally signed to direct.

Paula Prentiss and Jim Hutton were signed off the back of their success together in Where the Boys Are. MGM put them in three films: this, The Horizontal Lieutenant and The Honeymoon Machine and pushed them as a new William Powell and Myrna Loy.

Filming took place in May 1961.

== Reception ==
MGM was impressed by the film and signed Jack Arnold to direct for them for five years. Before the film was released they requested Hal Kanter to start writing a sequel, An Armful of Girls, with Hope as a married man chased over Europe by titled ladies. It was never made.

=== Critical ===
The Los Angeles Times called the film "frequently diverting". The New York Times said the movie "has enough sharp gags to make [Hope's] recent TV spectaculars unspectacular even though the romantic antics on which it is all pegged are somewhat less than inspired. This pleasantly varicolored 'Paradise' may not be heavenly but its mild fun and frolics should keep a viewer reasonably happy." Filmink called it "a film with some lively lines and satire of suburban America, plus that glossy early ‘60s MGM look... Prentiss is great, Turner isn’t."

=== Box office ===
According to MGM records, the film earned $2.5 million in the US and Canada and $1 million elsewhere but ultimately lost $344,000.

=== Awards ===
The title song for the film was nominated for an Oscar. It was performed by Ann-Margret at the Oscar's ceremony, and reception to this greatly boosted her career.

== See also ==
- List of American films of 1961
