= Richard W. Farrell =

American film editor (1910–1980)

- Born: Richard Watson Farrell; July 10, 1910; Oklahoma, U.S.
- Died: March 26, 1980 (aged 69); Los Angeles, California, U.S.
- Occupation: Film editor
- Years active: 1938–1971

Richard Watson Farrell (July 10, 1910 – March 26, 1980) was an American film editor.

== Selected filmography ==
Editor
Year	Film	Director	Notes	Ref.
1938	Highway Patrol	Charles C. Coleman		
1948	The Tender Years	Harold Schuster		
1948	The Green Promise	William D. Russell		
1955	Texas Lady	Tim Whelan		
1960	Desire in the Dust	William F. Claxton		
1961	Bachelor in Paradise	Jack Arnold		
1962	The Horizontal Lieutenant	Richard Thorpe	First collaboration with Richard Thorpe	
1962	Billy Rose's Jumbo	Charles Walters		
1967	The Scorpio Letters	Richard Thorpe	Second collaboration with Richard Thorpe	
1967	The Last Challenge	Richard Thorpe	Third collaboration with Richard Thorpe	
1968	Speedway	Norman Taurog		
1969	Some Kind of a Nut	Garson Kanin		
1970	The Delta Factor	Tay Garnett		

Editorial department
Year	Film	Director	Role	Notes
1941	Hold Back the Dawn	Mitchell Leisen	Assistant editor	Uncredited

Shorts

Editor
Year	Film	Director
1948	Jingle, Jangle, Jingle	Jerry Hopper

TV movies

Editor
Year	Film	Director
1967	The Scorpio Letters	Richard Thorpe
1970	How Awful About Allan	Curtis Harrington
1970	The Over-the-Hill Gang Rides Again	George McCowan

TV pilots

Editor
Year	Film	Director
1957	Collector's Item: The Left Fist of David	Buzz Kulik

TV series

Editor
Year	Title	Notes
1953	The Hank McCune Show	1 episode
1955	The Bob Hope Show	1 episode
1955−56	My Friend Flicka	11 episodes
1956	The 20th Century Fox Hour	4 episodes
1957	Broken Arrow	10 episodes
1959	The Third Man	4 episodes
1959−60	The Real McCoys	7 episodes
1961	The Tab Hunter Show	1 episode
1963−64	The Twilight Zone	10 episodes
1957−66	Perry Mason	38 episodes
1970−71	The Most Deadly Game	2 episodes

Editorial department
Year	Title	Role	Notes
1959	Five Fingers	Editorial supervision	1 episode
1959−60	Adventures in Paradise	Editorial supervision	8 episodes

Actor
Year	Title	Role	Notes	Other notes
1966	Perry Mason	Cutter	1 episode	Uncredited

Director
Year	Title	Notes
1958	Broken Arrow	1 episode

TV specials

Editor
Year	Film	Director
1950	One Hour in Wonderland	Richard Wallace
