= Whirlpool (1959 film) =

1959 British film by Lewis Allen

- Directed by: Lewis Allen
- Written by: Lawrence P. Bachmann; Marcel Stellman
- Based on: novel The Lorelei by Lawrence Bachmann
- Produced by: George Pitcher; Sam Lomberg executive Earl St. John
- Starring: Juliette Gréco; O.W. Fischer; Muriel Pavlow; Marius Goring
- Cinematography: Geoffrey Unsworth
- Edited by: Russell Lloyd
- Music by: Ron Goodwin
- Production company: Rank Organisation
- Distributed by: Rank Film Distributors
- Release date: 6 April 1959
- Running time: 95 minutes
- Country: United Kingdom
- Language: English

Whirlpool is a 1959 British crime film directed by Lewis Allen and starring Juliette Gréco and O. W. Fischer. It was written by Laurence P. Bachmann and Marcel Stellman, based on Bachmann's 1957 novel The Lorelei.

== Plot summary ==
A beautiful girl Lora asks Rolph if she can travel on his barge down the Rhine. Rolph agrees to this and helps her to escape the clutches of murderer Herman, who is obsessed with Lora.

The local police approach Rolph and ask him to work together with them to lure Herman on board the barge using Lora as bait. Herman manages to hide on board and then takes control of Rolph's barge using a gun he has. Rolph and Lora manage to overpower Herman and throw him overboard where he is dragged under the barge into one of the side paddles where he is killed.

Lora is a cynical person, believing that no one would ever do anything to help her out of just friendship due to the hard life she has had. At the end of the film, Lora leaves with the police, while Rolph asks her to return to him one day to live with him on his barge on the European rivers.

== Cast ==
- Juliette Gréco as Lora
- O. W. Fischer as Rolph
- Muriel Pavlow as Dina
- Marius Goring as Georg
- William Sylvester as Herman
- Richard Palmer as Derek
- Peter Illing as Braun
- Geoffrey Bayldon as Wendel
- Lily Kann as Mrs. Steen
- Harold Kasket as Stiebel
- Victor Brooks as riverman
- George Mikell as German policeman
- Jack Sharp as barge man

== Production ==
The film was originally known as Lorelei. Juliette Greco's signing was announced in August 1958. The same month Rank stated Hardy Kruger would play the male lead. However, not long afterwards O.W. Fisher was cast in the lead. Fisher was then one of the biggest stars in Germany and this was his first English language film although he had meant to star in My Man Godfrey (1957) in the US. His fee was a reported £30,000. He was one of a number of German stars signed by the Rank organisation to star in films after the success of Kurger in The One That Got Away (1957).

Filming started 1 September 1958 and took place at Pinewood Studios and on location in the Rhineland including Koblenz and Cologne. The film's sets were designed by the art director Jack Maxsted.

Greco's sister and mother had spent the war in a concentration camp while Greco had been in a Paris prison. She said she "hated" the Germans but accepted a part in Whirlpool "because I wanted to kill that hate".

However Greco clashed with Fisher during filming, saying "I have never been so insulted in my life as I have by this man Fisher. I would like to slap him in the face and knock him flat." Fisher, who was Austrian and did not serve in the army during the war, said in response, "Perhaps Miss Greco does not like me because I am a dedicated actor not interested in behaving like a film star, as she is. As an actress I think Miss Greco is a very good socialite."

In London, Greco later refused to attend a reception arranged by the German embassy in honour of the film.

The score from Ron Goodwin established him as a film composer.

== Reception ==
The Monthly Film Bulletin wrote: "Whirlpool's cast and setting continue the Rank Organisation's pursuit of the European – and specifically the West German – market. But a series of postcard studies of the Rhine, a glowering performance by Juliette Greco and a relentlessly stolid one by O. W. Fischer are almost all the production has to offer. The basic suspense situation is familiar but still workable; here, unhappily, no concern has been expended on making it work. Shots of the murderous Herman skulking along the river bank are almost arbitrarily inserted into the travelogue Rhine journey and the tone of the whole adventure is lethargic and insipid."

Variety called it a "turgid drama with indifferent acting, flat dialog and uneven lensing."

Filmink called it "perhaps the least British film made by Rank (though Muriel Pavlow is in it). It is flat and dull, a real oddity."

The Guardian called it "a dull thriller".
