= They Call It Murder =

- Based on: The D.A. Draws a Circle and characters by Erle Stanley Gardner
- Written by: Sam Rolfe
- Directed by: Walter Grauman
- Starring: Jim Hutton; Leslie Nielsen; Ed Asner; Jessica Walter; Jo Ann Pflug; Míriam Colón; Robert J. Wilke; William Elliott; Carmen Mathews
- Music by: Robert Drasnin
- Country of origin: United States
- Original language: English

Production
- Running time: 95 minutes
- Production companies: Paisano Productions in association with 20th Century Fox Television

Original release
- Network: NBC
- Release: December 17, 1971

They Call It Murder is a 1971 American television film directed by Walter Grauman and starring Jim Hutton.

== Production ==
They Call It Murder is a television film produced by Paisano Productions in association with 20th Century Fox. It was a pilot for a proposed TV movie series based on characters created by Erle Stanley Gardner, who edited the script by Sam Rolfe. Walter Grauman directed; Cornwell Jackson was executive producer. The film is loosely based on Gardner's 1939 novel The D.A. Draws a Circle.

The film went into production in 1969 and was completed February 9, 1970. Jim Hutton stars as Doug Selby, district attorney of a small town outside Los Angeles.

They Call It Murder was first presented December 17, 1971, on NBC. Gardner had died by the time the film finally was given its world premiere. Paisano Productions had worked to launch a Doug Selby series for six years, while its series Perry Mason was in its prime. No series materialized, and this TV movie marks Selby's sole screen adaptation.

== Cast ==
- Jim Hutton as Doug Selby, D.A.
- Lloyd Bochner as A.B. Carr
- Jo Ann Pflug as Sylvia Martin
- Robert J. Wilke as Sheriff Rex Brandon
- Edward Asner as Chief Otto Larkin
- Bill Elliott as Deputy Bob Terry
- Míriam Colón as Anita Nogales
- Jessica Walter as Jane Antrim
- Carmen Mathews as Doris Kane
- Leslie Nielsen as Frank Antrim
- Nita Talbot as Rona Corbin
- Vaughn Taylor as Dr. Harry Marshall
- Vic Tayback as Jeff Poland
- Harry Townes as Dr. Garnett
- Michael Pataki as Pete Cardiff
- Helen Kleeb as Ellen Saxe
- Valentin de Vargas as Alex Cordoba
- Dan White as Judge Faraday
- Norman Burton as the movie director
