= Packin' It In =

1983 American made-for-television film

- Genre: Comedy; Drama; Family
- Written by: Patricia Jones; Donald Reiker
- Directed by: Jud Taylor
- Starring: Richard Benjamin; Paula Prentiss; Tony Roberts
- Music by: Mark Snow
- Country of origin: United States
- Original language: English

Production
- Executive producers: Tony Converse; Roger Gimbel
- Producers: Patricia Jones; Donald Reiker
- Production location: British Columbia
- Cinematography: Robert E. Collins
- Editor: Michael Brown
- Running time: 95 minutes
- Production companies: CBS Entertainment Production; EMI Television; Jones-Reiker Ink Group; Lee Rock Industries Ltd. Roger Gimbel Productions

Original release
- Network: CBS
- Release: February 7, 1983

Packin' It In is a 1983 American made-for-television comedy-drama film starring Richard Benjamin and Paula Prentiss.

It was directed by Jud Taylor.

== Plot ==
A family decide to move to Oregon.

== Cast ==
- Richard Benjamin as Gary Webber
- Paula Prentiss as Diana Webber
- Tony Roberts as Charlie Baumgarten
- Andrea Marcovicci as Rita Baumgarten
- Molly Ringwald as Melissa Webber
- Mari Gorman as Brooklyn Mary
- Sam Whipple as Zack Estep
- Kenneth McMillan as Howard Estep
- David Hollander as Jay Webber
- Philip Proctor as Cliff, Gary's Coworker

== Production ==
Benjamin made it just after making his feature film debut as director, My Favorite Year. Although set in Oregon, the film was shot in Vancouver.

Benjamin and Prentiss brought their two children along on location. "That was great and there was just a nice family feeling," Benjamin said. "Paula and I have been married for 22 years. I was in a movie a few years ago called The Last Married Couple in America and now we are - at least we're one of the last in show business, anyway. We're real close and we like to work together. We have not worked together in television since we did the series called 'He and She' in 1970 and we had a great time doing that."

== Reception ==
The New York Times said the film had "some very funny bits and pieces. But the overall conception never quite holds together. It is only sporadically as good as it should be."
