= The Horizontal Lieutenant =

1962 film by Richard Thorpe

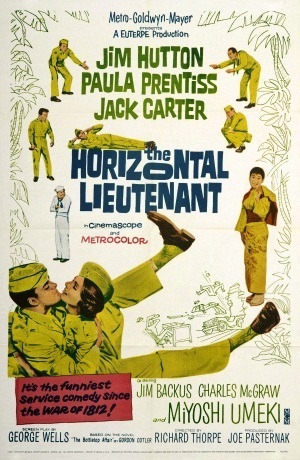
- theatrical release poster
- Directed by: Richard Thorpe
- Written by: George Wells
- Based on: novel The Bottletop Affair by Gordon Cotler
- Produced by: Joe Pasternak
- Starring: Jim Hutton; Paula Prentiss
- Cinematography: Robert J. Bronner
- Edited by: Richard W. Farrell
- Music by: George Stoll
- Production company: Euterpe
- Distributed by: Metro-Goldwyn-Mayer
- Release date: April 18, 1962 (U.S.)
- Running time: 90 minutes
- Country: United States
- Language: English
- Budget: $1,020,000
- Box office: $1,850,000

The Horizontal Lieutenant is a 1962 American romantic comedy war film, based on the 1959 novel The Bottletop Affair by Gordon Cotler, who was a Japanese interpreter for US Army Intelligence during World War II. It is a military comedy about an unfortunate army intelligence lieutenant who finds himself isolated on a remote island army outpost during World War II. It stars Jim Hutton and Paula Prentiss and was directed by Richard Thorpe.

It was the last of four teamings between Hutton and Prentiss following Where the Boys Are, The Honeymoon Machine and Bachelor in Paradise.

== Plot ==
Merle Wye, a 2nd Lieutenant Army Intelligence officer stationed in Hawaii, is rendered horizontal when struck in the head by a foul ball while playing for his unit's baseball team. In the post hospital he is attracted to Lt. Molly Blue, a nurse he once knew in college. His superior (and manager of the team) orders the inept Merle to distant Rotohan, a Pacific island liberated from Japanese occupation some months before, ostensibly to relieve Lt. Billy Monk, who has been unable to capture a Japanese holdout called Kobayashi suspected of pilfering military supplies. However the coach really wants Monk, a former professional baseball player, for his team. By claiming to be ordered to dangerous duty Merle tries to seduce Blue; when she discovers the ruse, she barely gives him the time of day.

On Rotohan, Merle and his Nisei interpreter (and lothario) Sgt. Roy Tada team up with Monk to flush out the wily thief hiding in the hills. Using a reluctant Tada as a "spy" they discover that Kobayashi has been stealing the supplies, all creature comforts, to feed and clothe his pregnant girlfriend. But Merle is distracted when Blue is also assigned to his camp. With the Navy, in the form of obnoxious Cmdr. Jeremiah Hammerslag, also hunting Kobayashi, Merle is threatened by his new superior, Col. Korotny, with another transfer if he does not capture Kobayashi soon—this time to an even more remote rock with only six other soldiers as company.

While romancing a local girl, Akiko, Tada discovers that Kobayashi is not even a soldier but a former circus performer hidden in a cave in the hills by the villagers. That night Kobayashi is to appear at a variety show staged by the locals to entertain the Americans. When Merle tries to arrest him, the agile Kobayashi stuns him using judo, knocking him horizontal again, and escapes. Col. Korotny tells Merle he is shipping out in the morning. During a drive in the hills to "say goodbye", Merle and Blue stumble on the cave, where Blue captures the acrobat after Merle once more becomes "the horizontal lieutenant". Merle is given a medal anyway and wins her heart.

== Cast ==
- Jim Hutton as Lt. Merle Wye
- Paula Prentiss as Lt. Molly Blue
- Jack Carter as Lt. Billy Monk
- Jim Backus as Cdr. Jeremiah Hammerslag
- Charles McGraw as Col. Charles Korotny
- Miyoshi Umeki as Akiko
- Marty Ingels as Buckles
- Lloyd Kino as Sgt. Jess Yomura
- Linda Wong as Michido
- Yoshio Yoda as Sgt. Roy Tada
- Yuki Shimoda as Kobayashi

== Production ==
The novel was published in 1959.

Hutton and Prentiss were under contract to MGM at the time.

It was known as The Bottle Cap Affair.

== Reception ==
=== Critical ===
According to Variety, the film "never gets off the ground." Filmink argued "the story goes all over the shop – Hutton keeps making mistakes and being saved by deux ex machinas, he becomes passive for much of the story which is taken over by his Japanese American mate, we never really got a fix on his character other than “bumbling”, no one seems to regard the Japanese as any sort of threat, Prentiss (who’s great as always) needed more to do, there should have been some life and death stakes. It simply wasn’t very good."

=== Box office ===
According to MGM records, the film earned $1.1 million in the US and Canada and $750,000 overseas, resulting in a loss of $380,000.

== Comic book adaptation ==
- Dell Movie Classic: The Horizontal Lieutenant (October 1962)

== See also ==
- List of American films of 1962
