= Ten Seconds to Hell =

1959 film by Robert Aldrich

- Theatrical poster
- Directed by: Robert Aldrich
- Screenplay by: Robert Aldrich; Teddi Sherman
- Based on: The Phoenix by Lawrence P. Bachmann
- Produced by: Michael Carreras
- Starring: Jack Palance; Jeff Chandler; Martine Carol; Robert Cornthwaite; Virginia Baker; Richard Wattis; Wesley Addy; Dave Willock; James Goodwin; Nancy Lee
- Cinematography: Ernest Laszlo; Len Harris
- Edited by: Henry Richardson; James Needs
- Music by: Muir Mathieson; Kenneth V. Jones; Richard Farrell
- Production companies: UFA Studios; Seven Arts–Hammer Films
- Distributed by: United Artists
- Release date: 15 June 1959 (UK)
- Running time: 93 min. (edited down from 131 minutes)
- Countries: United Kingdom; West Germany
- Language: English
- Budget: $1.1 million
- Box office: 331,938 admissions (France)

Ten Seconds To Hell (released in the UK as The Phoenix) is a 1959 British and West German film directed by Robert Aldrich, based on Lawrence P. Bachmann's novel The Phoenix. The Hammer Films/UFA joint production stars Jack Palance, Jeff Chandler and Martine Carol.

Set in the aftermath of World War II, the film focuses on a half-dozen Germans who return to a devastated Berlin and find employment as a bomb disposal squad, tasked with clearing the city of unexploded Allied bombs. They form a tontine, into which they pool half of their salaries which those still alive at the end of three months will divide. Eventually, only two men are left.

Robert Aldrich's direction is noted for its meticulous attention to the techniques of bomb deactivation and disposal. Hammer bought the rights to the novel in 1955, but took some time before preproduction began in Berlin on Jan. 7, 1958. It was originally slated to star Gregory Peck and Stanley Baker, but was recast later with Jack Palance and Peter Van Eyck (who was later replaced by Jeff Chandler). Filming started Feb. 24, 1958. The film originally ran 131 minutes, but United Artists edited it down to 93 minutes before its release. It was released on June 15, 1958 and in spite of James Carreras' predictions, the film did rather poorly at the box office.

== Plot ==
In post-war Berlin, British Major Haven recruits members of what's left of a returning German bomb disposal unit—Hans Globke, Peter Tillig, Wolfgang Sulke, Franz Loeffler, Karl Wirtz and Eric Koertner—to defuse unexploded Allied bombs throughout the city.

Karl bets Eric that he will outlive him. The other men soon agree that half of their salaries will go to the survivors in three months' time. Major Haven assigns Frau Bauer as their liaison. Karl volunteers to lead the unit, but the men vote for the reluctant Eric instead.

Later, Karl and Eric move into a boarding house run by pretty young widow Margot Hoefler, a Frenchwoman whose German husband died during the war.

The men defuse numerous bombs without incident; then young Globke is killed after a British 1000-pound bomb he thought he had properly defused blows up. Eric gives the others the chance to leave, but nobody accepts. Later, Haven offers Eric the same choice, for him and his men, but he turns it down. Suspecting that the 1000-pound bombs have double fuses, Eric asks Haven to request information.

After a night out together, a drunk Karl returns with Margot. He tries to force himself on her, so Eric bursts in and orders Karl to leave. When Eric criticizes her behavior, Margot explains that she is considered a traitor by the French and an outsider to the Germans. She then accuses him of denying his own desires.

A few days later, Tillig is trapped under a bomb by the partial collapse of a building. Eric and Karl race to the site, followed by the others; Eric rushes into the building, and after some hesitation, Karl follows him. Despite Tillig's protests, Karl starts defusing the bomb, but Eric takes over, as it is his turn, sends Karl to fetch a doctor, and neutralizes the bomb. While the doctor treats Tillig, Eric goes outside to guide the men and equipment; Karl leaves too. Before they arrive, the building collapses on Tillig and the doctor. Distraught, Eric returns to the boardinghouse where he seeks solace from Margot. The next day, Eric takes Margot to another ruined section of the city to show her something, but changes his mind. (The foundation stone of a building reveals that he designed it.) Eric finally admits he loves Margot.

Back at headquarters, Haven tells Eric that they are having trouble getting information. Haven reveals that Eric is Dr. Koertner, a promising architect before the war. Eric tells Haven that he was forced into demolitions for expressing his anti-Nazi sentiments. Karl urges him to quit, but Eric refuses.

A month before the wager's deadline, Sulke is killed defusing another 1000-pounder. Eric and Loeffler discuss giving the bet money to Sulke's widow and baby. Karl scoffs at the suggestion. The next day Loeffler drowns trying to defuse a bomb found in a canal when his air line is cut and nobody notices. That afternoon Margot urges Eric to give up; he explains he has come to realize "this is a battle of survival between the Karls of the world and the me's of the world, nothing more." Margot tells him she loves him regardless, and they embrace.

Later, Karl phones and says he has a 1000-pound bomb. Eric joins him to make an inspection. Eric has an idea on how to defuse it, which Karl decides to try. After removing the top of the bomb, Karl calls for help, saying the secondary firing pin has slipped and is only being kept from activating by his finger. Eric gives him a pencil to replace his finger. Eric holds the pencil in place and sends Karl to retrieve his tools. Then Karl pulls the rope used to unscrew the cap, forcing him to release the pencil. The bomb does not explode, and realizing that Karl has tried to kill him, Eric punches him in the face. Karl says, "Guess it's still my bomb," and resumes defusing the bomb. Once Eric is a safe distance away, the bomb explodes, killing Karl.

== Cast ==
- Jack Palance as Erik Koertner
- Jeff Chandler as Karl Wirtz
- Martine Carol as Margot Hofer
- Robert Cornthwaite as Franz Loeffler
- Virginia Baker as Frau Bauer
- Richard Wattis as Major Haven
- Wesley Addy as Wolfgang Sulke
- Dave Willock as Peter Tillig
- James Goodwin as Hans Globke
- Nancy Lee as Ruth Sulke
- Charles Nolte as Doctor

== Production ==
Robert Aldrich had just been fired from making The Garment Jungle:

I couldn't get a job. Now that year was over, and I couldn't get a job. It goes back to staying at the table. Anybody that stays away for awhile, voluntarily or involuntarily, risks never coming back. Then somebody brought me The Phoenix. I figured I might as well get out of town, so I rewrote it much to its detriment and went to Germany.

It was only the second film from the newly formed Seven Arts Productions. The original title was The Phoenix and it was also known as 6 to 1 and The ExtraEdge.

Filming took place in West Berlin over a ten-week period. The movie features, in a small role, Jim Hutton, who was serving in the American army in West Berlin at the time.

== Reception ==
Variety called it "a downbeat picture that registers little audience impact."

== Home media ==
Ten Seconds to Hell was released to Blu-ray DVD by Kino Lorber (under license from MGM) on February 24, 2015 as a Region 1 disc.

== Attempted remake ==
In the early 2000s, a remake of the film was planned, with Gore Verbinski directing.
