= Doug Selby =

Character in novels by Erle Stanley Gardner

First edition dust jacket of The D.A. Calls it Murder (1937), the first mystery in the Doug Selby series

Doug Selby is a fictional creation of Erle Stanley Gardner. He appears in nine books, most originally serialized in magazines. He was portrayed by Jim Hutton in a 1971 television movie, They Call It Murder, loosely based on The D.A. Draws a Circle—the only film adaptation of the series.

== Character ==
Doug Selby started his literary life as the newly elected District Attorney (D.A.) in the fictional Madison County, California (based on Ventura County, California, where Gardner lived and worked for a time). The city and county were politically corrupt, though Doug and the newly elected Sheriff Rex Brandon ran on a reform ticket and won the offices of District Attorney and Sheriff.

Life as a rural county D.A. was not easy for Selby. In his first case (The D.A. Calls It Murder), the opposition newspaper The Blade steadfastly opposed him, and called for his resignation over his first case. Was it murder? Even Sylvia Martin, the reporter for the Clarion (the friendly newspaper that supported his campaign, and was loyal to him afterwards) gave him only 24 hours to solve the crime — and prove himself worthy of the office. The Blade was totally ruthless in their attacks against Selby. It was eventually revealed they were part of a political machine that ran the county, though in the final book the new owner was just out for profit via political persecution. Selby, as the D.A., encountered several additional cases. His next, documented in The D.A. Holds a Candle, pitted him against a wealthy family of the area. A daughter of the family, Inez Stapleton, was Doug's love interest before he ran for district attorney. Doug eventually showed her brother was part of a criminal conspiracy, which ruined the family's social standing, though Inez seemed to love Doug all the more and was determined to make him respect her. She decided to become a lawyer herself and stand against him in that quest.

Doug's greatest opponent was the great criminal defense attorney Alphonse Baker Carr, who claimed to be seeking a peaceful rural community in which to retire from his Los Angeles practice. In The D.A. Draws a Circle A.B.C. figured out a criminal case through which he could blackmail his way into local influence. He was able to escape prosecution, but remained the arch-enemy of Selby through the rest of the series.

A.B. Carr was portrayed as a kind of opposite of Gardner's best known character, Perry Mason - unscrupulous, amoral and cynical. Doug Selby the opposite of Hamilton Burger, being concerned solely with justice and equity, not caring a fig about his batting average as a prosecutor, or about his image in the press.

Inez Stapleton returned to Madison City sometime after that, having earned her law degree and license, having passed the bar exam. She was his opponent in a case during The D.A. Goes to Trial, though Selby dropped the charges against her client after finding the proof he needed to arrest and convict the guilty party.

Doug Selby resigned as the D.A. of Madison County sometime prior to The D.A. Breaks a Seal. He had enlisted in the military as an intelligence officer, but returned to Madison City while on leave. In the process, he helps many of his old friends. He helps his former partner, Rex Brandon, to arrest a killer; his old flame and good friend, Inez Stapleton, to win a will contest lawsuit (which involved a very clever case of perjury) against A.B.C.; and provides his reporter friend, Sylvia Martin, with the story behind a murder and an attempted murder.

Doug Selby returned to Madison County, and was again the D.A. for the final two stories. Talk from The D.A. Takes a Chance shows that Selby, after returning from his service in World War II, was popular enough to regain the D.A. job. He again fought for justice, and dealt some crippling blows against his old nemesis in that book. Selby finally got needed proof to charge A.B.C. with criminal conspiracy; however, it was negated by a brilliant piece of legal strategy by Carr. Selby returned for a final book, The D.A. Breaks an Egg, which explores some of the ramifications of the strategy used in the previous book, and leads up to a final showdown between Selby, Sheriff Brandon and A.B. Carr. Although Gardner had decided to end the series at that point, he left enough uncertainty in the resolution to make it possible that old A.B.C. would slip out of it yet again, giving Gardner the option of writing more "D.A." stories with his established villain.

The Doug Selby books often point out what is right and wrong about American justice systems. While Selby and Brandon were a partnership geared towards the ideals of justice, Madison City police chief Otto Larkin was portrayed as a political hack, who arrested suspects and would just blame the D.A. if there wasn't a conviction. Similarly, in The D.A. Breaks a Seal, Brandon tells Selby that the new D.A. would blame him for not getting the evidence needed to convict.

== Bibliography ==
Doug Selby appeared in the following books.

1. The D.A. Calls it Murder (1937)
  Serialized as "The Thread of Truth" in The Country Gentleman, September 1936–January 1937; William Morrow and Company, January 1937
2. The D.A. Holds a Candle (1938)
  Serialized in The Country Gentleman, September 1938–January 1939; William Morrow and Company, November 1938
3. The D.A. Draws a Circle (1939)
  William Morrow and Company, September 1939
  Jacques Barzun and Wendell Hertig Taylor, A Catalogue of Crime: "This sample of Doug Selby's work is really distinguished, as is the creation of the unscrupulous but smooth lawyer-villain A. B. Carr. The hostile byplay with the police chief is also well done."
4. The D.A. Goes to Trial (1940)
  Serialized in The Country Gentleman, April–July 1940; William Morrow and Company, June 1940
5. The D.A. Cooks a Goose (1942)
  Serialized in The Country Gentleman, September 1941–January 1942; William Morrow and Company, January 1942
6. The D.A. Calls a Turn (1944)
  Serialized in The Country Gentleman, November 1943–March 1944; William Morrow and Company, January 1944
7. The D.A. Breaks a Seal (1946)
  Serialized in The Saturday Evening Post, December 1, 1945 – January 12, 1946; William Morrow and Company, February 1946
8. The D.A. Takes a Chance (1948)
  Serialized in The Saturday Evening Post, July 31–September 18, 1948; William Morrow and Company, October 1948
9. The D.A. Breaks an Egg (1949)
  William Morrow and Company, August 1949
  Jacques Barzun and Wendell Hertig Taylor, A Catalogue of Crime: "There are some pretty bits of skulduggery, shrewd guessing, and also improbability in this well-told item in the D.A. series."

== Adaptations ==
=== Radio ===
The first Saturday Evening Post installment of The D.A. Takes a Chance was adapted for an episode of the ABC radio serial, Listening Post, broadcast July 28, 1948.

=== Television ===
The 1971 television film, They Call It Murder, was loosely based on The D.A. Draws a Circle. Jim Hutton stars as Doug Selby. Completed in February 1970, the two-hour movie aired December 17, 1971.
