= Jack Maxsted =

English art director

- Born: Albert John Maxsted; 30 April 1916; Kingston, Surrey, England
- Died: September 2001 (aged 85); Bath, Somerset, England
- Occupation: Art director
- Years active: 1939–1979

Albert John Maxsted (30 April 1916 – September 2001) was an English art director. He won an Academy Award in the category Best Art Direction for the film Nicholas and Alexandra.

== Selected filmography ==
- The Million Pound Note (1954)
- The Purple Plain (1954)
- Tiger in the Smoke (1956)
- Rockets Galore! (1957)
- Dangerous Exile (1957)
- Whirlpool (1959)
- When Eight Bells Toll (1971)
- Nicholas and Alexandra (1971)
- Diamonds Are Forever (1971)

== Personal life ==
Maxsted married Edna M Barton in 1939.
