= Zero One (TV series) =

British television series (1962–1965)

Promotional poster

Zero One is a British TV series that ran from 1962 to 1965. It starred Nigel Patrick and was produced by Lawrence Bachmann. It was a partnership between BBC and MGM-British. There were 39 episodes.

The series followed adventures of airline detective Alan Garnett. “Zero One” was the call sign of the International Air Security Board, an international air travel security force.

== Cast ==
- Nigel Patrick as Alan Garnett
- William Smith as Jim Delaney, Garnett’s assistant
- Katya Douglas as Maya, Garnett’s secretary
- Hugh McDermott as Archie Vane
- Gordon Sterne as Ziggy
- Moira Redmond as Annabelle, Marine Dorlian
- Warren Mitchell as Captain Awad, Suleman Bey
- David Bauer as Mancini, Sporanza
- John Gabriel as Gassini
- Gerald Andersen as Doctor, Dr. Chantler
- Ken Parry as Frenchy, Italian tourist
- Geoffrey Keen as Mr. Gates
- Nigel Davenport as Mills
- Peter Sallis as Major Konel
- Bernard Archard as Atkins
- William Lucas as Alex
- Alfred Burke as Jenkins

Guests included Harry H. Corbett, Adrienne Corri, Moira Lister, Arthur Lowe, Patrick Magee, Lois Maxwell, Warren Mitchell, Michael Robbins, Margaret Rutherford, Leonard Sachs, Peter Sallis and Victor Spinetti.
