= Walk, Don't Run (film) =

1966 film by Charles Walters

- Theatrical release poster
- Directed by: Charles Walters
- Screenplay by: Sol Saks
- Story by: Robert Russell; Frank Ross
- Produced by: Sol C. Siegel
- Starring: Cary Grant; Samantha Eggar; Jim Hutton
- Cinematography: Harry Stradling Sr.
- Edited by: Walter A. Thompson; James D. Wells
- Music by: Quincy Jones
- Production company: Sol C. Siegel Productions
- Distributed by: Columbia Pictures
- Release date: June 29, 1966 (United States)
- Running time: 114 minutes
- Country: United States
- Language: English
- Box office: $7.5 million

Walk, Don't Run is a 1966 American romantic comedy film directed by Charles Walters (in his final film as a director), and starring Cary Grant (in his final film role), Samantha Eggar, and Jim Hutton. It follows a travelling industrialist visiting Tokyo, as he shares accommodation with a male athlete and a female apartment tenant during the 1964 Summer Olympics. The film is a remake of the 1943 film The More the Merrier. The title stems from the basic rule of racewalking: that competitors must not run at any point (both feet leaving the ground).

== Plot ==
In 1964, British businessman Sir William Rutland arrives two days early in Tokyo and encounters an accommodation shortage caused by the 1964 Summer Olympics. While at the British Embassy seeking help, he spots an advertisement for a roommate and soon finds himself at the residence of Christine Easton, who insists it would be improper to take him in as a housemate. Easton has forgotten to advertise that she wants to sublet to a woman, but eventually lets Rutland stay.

Rutland sublets half of the space to American Olympic competitor Steve Davis, without consulting Easton. While she is less than thrilled with the arrangement, she has to put up with it as she has already spent Rutland's share of the rent. Rutland sets about playing matchmaker for the two young people, in spite of their differing personalities and Easton's engagement to a boringly dependable British diplomat, Julius D. Haversack.

Davis repeatedly dodges questions about his Olympic sport. Rutland meddles in the young couple's romantic troubles. To further his matchmaking, he strips down to his boxer shorts and a T-shirt so he can pretend to be a competitor and talk to Davis during his event, the 50-kilometre walk, and eventually heals the breach between the young lovers.

== Cast ==
- Cary Grant as Sir William Rutland
- Samantha Eggar as Christine Easton
- Jim Hutton as Steve Davis
- John Standing as Julius P. Haversack (although in the dialogue, the middle initial is given as "D")
- Miiko Taka as Aiko Kurawa
- Ted Hartley as Yuri Andreyovitch
- Ben Astar as Dimitri
- George Takei as Police Captain
- Teru Shimada as Mr. Kurawa
- Terry Farnsworth as Olympic walker
- Lois Kiuchi as Mrs. Kurawa

== Production ==
Filming locations were at the Hotel Okura Tokyo, Embassy of the United Kingdom, Tokyo, and Yoyogi National Gymnasium.

Samantha Eggar had just made The Collector and this was her first Hollywood comedy.

After filming, Grant retired from acting to focus on raising his daughter Jennifer. He died in 1986. Filmink argued the film "doesn’t have much of a reputation (in part, one suspects, because people resent the fact that it was Grant’s last movie), but it was quite popular."

== Score ==
The film's music was composed by Quincy Jones, and Peggy Lee collaborated on the songs "Stay with Me" and "Happy Feet".

=== Personnel ===
- Quincy Jones – composer, conductor
- Toots Thielemans – harmonica, whistles
- Harry "Sweets" Edison – trumpet
- Bud Shank – reeds
- Earl Palmer – drums
- Carol Kaye – electric bass
- Emil Richards – percussion
- Don Elliot Voices – vocals on "Happy Feet"
- Tony Clementi – vocals on "Stay with Me"
- Jack Hayes, Leo Shuken – orchestrations
- Richard Hazard – vocal orchestrations

== Reception ==
The New York Times was approving: "a summery sermon that most audiences should swallow with a smile....brashly good-natured and airy frolic....Yes, this is our old friend 'The More The Merrier'....The new version...deliberately sidesteps the quiet, smug deftness of its predecessor....If the outcome is obvious, the climactic scramble is fast and generally funny....Miss Eggar makes a tasty, red-haired dish....Mr. Hutton is excelllent....But it is the genial, suave sportsmanship of the veteran star [Grant]...that prods 'Walk, Don't Run' into such a disarming trot."

The film grossed $7,500,000 at the box office, earning $4.5 million in US theatrical rentals. It was the 29th highest-grossing film of 1966.

== See also ==
- List of American films of 1966
- List of films about the sport of athletics

== Bibliography ==
- Reid, John Howard. "Walk, Don't Run." Reid's Film Index, no. 36 (1998): 178–181.
