= Lawrence Bachmann =

American film producer and executive (1911–2004)

Lawrence Paul Bachmann (December 12, 1911 – September 7, 2004) was an American film producer and executive who settled for a time in the United Kingdom. He was head of MGM's British operations in the 1960s.

== Biography ==
Bachmann was born in New York City, where his father, J. G. Bachmann, worked at Paramount with B. P. Schulberg in the 1920s. He gained employment in the motion picture industry aged 16, beginning as an assistant film editor at Universal. He graduated with a bachelor's degree from University of South Carolina (USC) and then a master's degree at Oxford University in the UK. After his period of formal education, he became an assistant to Pandro S. Berman, who was then head of production at RKO. He switched to MGM to work for J.J. Cohn, head of the B-picture unit writing screenplays and becoming a producer.

During World War II, Bachmann served in the U.S. Army Air Forces and was the principal overseas correspondent for Air Force magazine. After the war, he worked in Berlin as head of films for the US State Department, then lived in France and Italy.

Bachmann moved to the UK where his novel Whirlpool was adapted by the Rank Organisation.

He became head of production for Paramount's British subsidiary. He then performed a similar function for MGM, joining the studio in 1959. He ran MGM British for some years. Among other films he supervised the four Miss Marple films featuring Margaret Rutherford in the lead role. In 1962 he announced a film version of Bleak House to be written by Agatha Christie but it was not made.

After becoming an independent producer, Bachmann was interviewed by The New York Times in 1982. According to Bachmann, "You don't need a huge organization" or "wastefully high budgets. All you need is a good story, the right attack, and the determination to make a movie for a reasonable price."

Bachmann died at the Motion Picture Country Home and Hospital in Woodland Hills, Los Angeles on September 7, 2004.

== Credits ==
- Jalna (1935) - writer
- Speed (1936) - story
- They Wanted to Marry (1937) - story
- The People vs. Dr. Kildare (1941) - stry
- Dr. Kildare's Wedding Day (1941) - story
- Calling Dr. Gillespie (1942) - writer (uncredited)
- Fingers at the Window (1942) - writer
- Dr. Gillespie's New Assistant (1942) - writer
- Dr. Gillespie's Criminal Case (1943) - writer
- Shadow on the Wall (1950) - story "Death in a Doll's House"
- The Devil Makes Three (1952) - story
- Whirlpool (1959) - writer, original novel "The Lorelai"
- Ten Seconds to Hell (1959) - original novel "The Phoenix"
- Village of the Damned (1960) - head of MGM British
- Murder, She Said (1961) - head of MGM British
- The Green Helmet (1961) - head of MGM British
- Kill or Cure (1962) - executive producer
- In the Cool of the Day (1962) - head of MGM British
- The Password is Courage (1962) - head of MGM British
- Cairo (1963) - executive producer
- The Friendliest Girls in the World (1963) -head of MGM British
- The Haunting (1963) - head of MGM British
- Follow the Boys (1963) - story, producer
- Murder at the Gallop (1963) - producer (uncredited)
- Children of the Damned (1964) - executive producer
- Night Must Fall (1964) - executive producer
- Murder Most Foul (1964) - executive producer
- Zero One (1962–65) (TV series) - producer
- The Alphabet Murders (1966) - producer
- Whose Life Is It Anyway? (1981) - producer

=== Films Made as Head of MGM British ===
- Village of the Damned
- The Green Helmet
- The Secret Partner
- Invasion Quartert
- Murder She Said
- Cairo
- Kill or Cure
- Follow the Boys
