= Paula Prentiss =

American actress (born 1938)

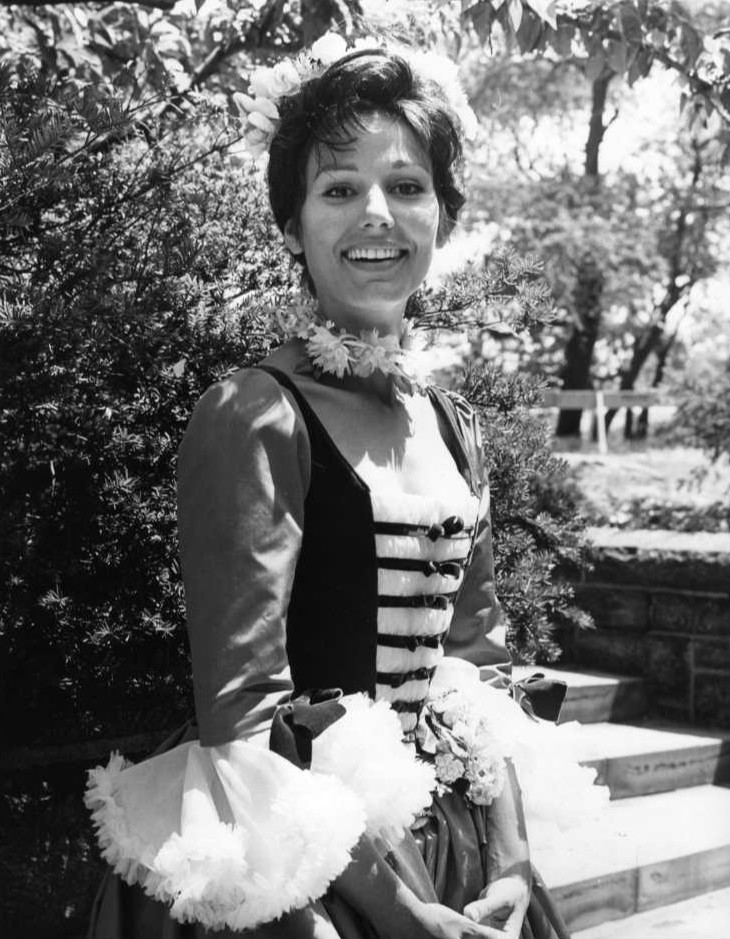
- Prentiss in 1963
- Born: Paula Ragusa; March 4, 1938 (age 88); San Antonio, Texas, US
- Education: Northwestern University
- Occupation: Actress
- Years active: 1960–present
- Spouse: Richard Benjamin (m. 1961)
- Children: 2
- Relatives: Ann Prentiss (sister)

Paula Prentiss (née Ragusa; born March 4, 1938) is an American actress. She is best known for her film roles in Where the Boys Are (1960), Man's Favorite Sport? (1964), What's New Pussycat? (1965), Catch-22 (1970), The Parallax View (1974), and The Stepford Wives (1975).

From 1967 to 1968, Prentiss co-starred with her husband Richard Benjamin in the CBS sitcom He & She, for which she received a nomination for Primetime Emmy Award for Outstanding Lead Actress in a Comedy Series.

== Early life ==
Prentiss was born Paula Ragusa in San Antonio, Texas, the elder daughter of Paulene (née Gardner) and Thomas J. Ragusa, a social sciences professor at San Antonio's University of the Incarnate Word. Her father was of Sicilian descent, and Prentiss was raised Roman Catholic. She had a younger sister, Ann Prentiss, who was also an actress.

Before high school, Paula, who grew to 5 ft 10 in (1.78 m), was always the tallest person in class. She attended Lamar High School in Houston. After high school, she was a pre-med student at Randolph-Macon Women's College, but transferred to Northwestern University during her junior year after taking a summer course in theater arts at Northwestern, deciding to study drama there. In 1958, while at Northwestern, she met future husband Richard Benjamin, who impressed her with his sophistication and height (he was taller than she was). While attending Northwestern she was discovered by Metro-Goldwyn-Mayer and was offered a film contract. She graduated from Northwestern in 1959.

== Career ==
=== MGM ===
Prentiss leapt to fame playing the role of Tuggle in Where the Boys Are (1960). Her co-star was Jim Hutton. The film was a hit and response to Prentiss and Hutton was very favorable, so MGM decided to reteam them in three more comedies, promoting them as a new William Powell and Myrna Loy: The Honeymoon Machine (1961) with Steve McQueen, Bachelor in Paradise (1961) with Bob Hope, and The Horizontal Lieutenant (1962). Prentiss and Hutton were the two tallest male and female contract players at Metro-Goldwyn-Mayer.

Hutton and Prentiss were also meant to be in Follow the Boys (1963), a Where the Boys Are–style comedy, but he dropped out, and so Prentiss' co-star became Russ Tamblyn.

=== Howard Hawks ===
Howard Hawks cast her as the female lead opposite Rock Hudson in Man's Favorite Sport? (1964) at Universal, her first film outside MGM. Hawks would later say: "Paula Prentiss was good, but she couldn't remember what she was doing from one shot to the next. Her shots never matched."

Prentiss appeared on stage in a production of As You Like It in 1963 at the New York Shakespeare Festival in Central Park.

She had notable roles in The World of Henry Orient (1964) and In Harm's Way (1965) and made a cameo as herself in Looking for Love (1964). She also had a strong supporting role in What's New Pussycat? (1965) with Peter Sellers. However, on the set of that film she had a nervous breakdown. "One day during shooting," she told People in 1976, "I just climbed up the ropes to the catwalk and started walking the beams. Very loudly and clearly I called down to everyone on the set, 'I'm going to jump.' A French technician grabbed me, and there I was, hanging by one arm." She was hospitalized for nine months. Ironically, her character in the film, a neurotic exotic dancer, threatens to kill herself due to unrequited love for the main character.

For one season (1967–1968), Prentiss co-starred with her husband, Richard Benjamin, in the CBS sitcom He & She. For her role, Prentiss was nominated for an Emmy Award for Best Performance by an Actress in a Comedy.

In 1969 she appeared Off-Broadway in the double production, Arf and The Great Airplane Snatch, directed by Benjamin.

=== 1970s and later ===
Prentiss returned to films as Nurse Duckett in the film adaptation of Joseph Heller's novel Catch-22 (1970). She had the female lead in Move (1970) with Elliott Gould and Born to Win (1971) with George Segal. She was one of the leads in Last of the Red Hot Lovers with Alan Arkin. Next, Prentiss was in the made-for-television film, The Couple Takes a Wife (1972).

She was the female lead in Crazy Joe (1974) and had a small but pivotal part in The Parallax View (1974) with Warren Beatty. She was second lead in The Stepford Wives (1975), alongside Katharine Ross.

In 1976, Prentiss and Benjamin appeared on Broadway in The Norman Conquests. After that, they traveled to Australia to make No Room to Run (1977).

Prentiss was in Having Babies II (1977), Friendships, Secrets and Lies (1979), and Top of the Hill (1980). She had a starring role in The Black Marble (1980), but it was not widely seen.

She did Saturday the 14th (1981) with her husband and was in director Billy Wilder's last film, Buddy Buddy (1981), with Jack Lemmon and Walter Matthau. She then made Packin' It In (1983) with her husband and did the made-for-television film, M.A.D.D.: Mothers Against Drunk Drivers (1983).

Prentiss guest starred on TV shows like Murder, She Wrote and Burke's Law.

Except for brief cameo roles, Prentiss had not appeared in a feature film for more than 30 years, until 2016's I Am the Pretty Thing That Lives in the House, a horror film directed by Oz Perkins. It premiered September 10, 2016 at the Toronto International Film Festival.

== Personal life ==
Prentiss has been married to actor-director Richard Benjamin since 1961. They have two children, a son and a daughter.

There is a street named after Prentiss in San Antonio, Texas.

== Appraisal ==
Filmink magazine argued "we don’t think that there’s any actor who more deserved to become a star – what’s more, this (a) was obvious from her first time, (b) everyone in Hollywood knew it, and (c) many filmmakers and executives tried to make it happen" calling her "the heir to Carole Lombard and Kay Kendall, actresses who specialised in eccentric ditzes but were also capable of sensitive dramatic performances."

== Filmography ==
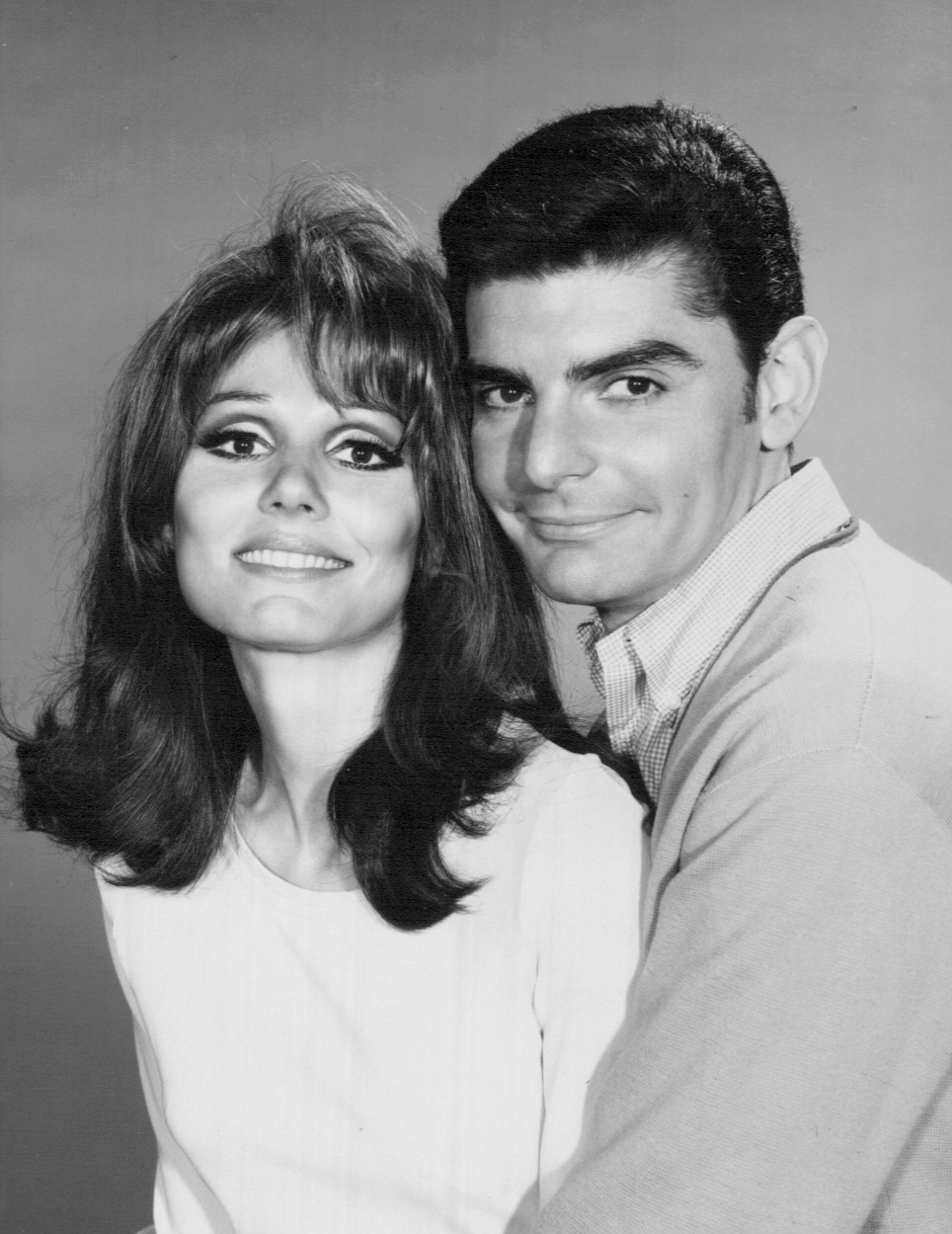
With Richard Benjamin in a publicity photo for He & She, 1967

=== Film ===
Year	Title	Role	Notes
1960	Where the Boys Are	Tuggle Carpenter	Laurel Award for Best Female Comedy Performance; Nominated—Top Female New Personality
1961	The Honeymoon Machine	Pam Dunstan	
1961	Bachelor in Paradise	Linda Delavane	
1962	The Horizontal Lieutenant	Lt. Molly Blue	
1963	Follow the Boys	Toni Denham	
1964	Man's Favorite Sport?	Abigail Page	
1964	The World of Henry Orient	Stella Dunnworthy	
1964	Looking for Love	Paula Prentiss	
1965	In Harm's Way	Beverly McConnell	
1965	What's New Pussycat?	Liz Bien	
1970	Catch-22	Nurse Duckett	
1970	Move	Dolly Jaffe	
1971	Born to Win	Veronica	
1972	Last of the Red Hot Lovers	Bobbi Michele	
1974	Crazy Joe	Anne	
1974	The Parallax View	Lee Carter	
1975	The Stepford Wives	Bobbie Markowe	
1980	The Black Marble	Sgt. Natalie Zimmerman	
1981	Saturday the 14th	Mary Hyatt	Nominated—1981 Stinkers Bad Movie Award for Worst Supporting Actress
1981	Buddy Buddy	Celia Clooney	Nominated—1981 Stinkers Bad Movie Award for Worst Supporting Actress
1996	Mrs. Winterbourne	Nurse Allmeyer	Uncredited
2007	Hard Four	Sweet Cherrie	
2016	I Am the Pretty Thing That Lives in the House	Iris Blum	

=== Television ===
Year	Title	Role	Notes
1963	77 Sunset Strip	Model	Uncredited; Episode: "The Fumble"
1967–68	He & She	Paula Hollister	Main role, 26 episodes Nominated—Primetime Emmy Award for Outstanding Lead Actress in a Comedy Series
1972	The Couple Takes a Wife	Barbara Hamilton	Television film
1977	No Room to Run	Terry McKenna	Television film
1977	Having Babies II	Trish Canfield	Television film
1979	Friendships, Secrets and Lies	Sandy	Television film
1980	Top of the Hill	Norma Ellsworth Cully	Television film
1980	Saturday Night Live	Co-Host (with Richard Benjamin)	Episode: April 5, 1980 Musical Guest: Grateful Dead
1981	Mr. and Mrs. Dracula	Sonia Dracula	Unaired pilot
1983	Packin' It In	Dianne Webber	Television film
1983	M.A.D.D.: Mothers Against Drunk Drivers	Lynne Wiley	Television film
1992	Murder, She Wrote	Leonora Holt	Episode: "Incident in Lot 7"
1995	Burke's Law	Carla Martinet	Episode: "Who Killed the Hollywood Headshrinker?"
