= Follow the Boys (1963 film) =

1963 film by Richard Thorpe

- Theatrical film poster
- Directed by: Richard Thorpe
- Written by: David T. Chantler; David D. Osborne
- Based on: story by Lawrence Bachmann
- Produced by: Lawrence Bachmann
- Starring: Paula Prentiss; Connie Francis; Janis Paige
- Cinematography: Ted Scaife
- Edited by: John Victor-Smith
- Music by: Ron Goodwin; Alexander Courage
- Production company: Franmet Productions
- Distributed by: Metro-Goldwyn-Mayer
- Release date: February 27, 1963
- Running time: 95 minutes
- Country: United States
- Language: English

Follow the Boys is a 1963 American comedy film directed by Richard Thorpe and starring Connie Francis, Paula Prentiss, and Janis Paige, released by Metro-Goldwyn-Mayer. Shot on location on the French and Italian Riviera, Follow the Boys was MGM's second film vehicle for top recording artist Francis following Where the Boys Are (1960). While Francis' role in the earlier film had been somewhat secondary, she had a distinctly central role in Follow the Boys playing Bonnie Pulaski, a newlywed traveling the Riviera.

== Plot ==
Bonnie visits various ports-of-call in hopes of a rendezvous with her sailor husband, who is summoned to active duty from their honeymoon. She arrives at his departure point, in Nice, a few minutes after his ship leaves, so follows the ship to Italy in a somewhat rickety and battered pink 2 CV. Bonnie is accompanied by veteran navy wife Liz and two other officers' girlfriends, Toni and Michele, who are likewise intent on romantic reunions. Happy endings for each of the ladies are delayed by a series of romantic and comedic misunderstandings.

== Cast ==
- Connie Francis as Bonnie Pulaski
- Paula Prentiss as Toni Denham
- Janis Paige as Liz Bradville
- Dany Robin as Michele Perrier
- Russ Tamblyn as Lt(JG) "Smitty" Smith
- Richard Long as Lt(JG) Pete Langley
- Ron Randell as Lt. Cmdr. Ben Bradville
- Roger Perry as Radarman 3rd Class Billy Pulaski

== Production ==
The movie followed the success of MGM's Where the Boys Are, which was about four women seeking romance in Fort Lauderdale during spring break. It starred Connie Francis and Paula Prentiss, who would be in Follow the Boys.

MGM producer-writer Lawrence P. Bachmann had a vacation home in the south of France. While staying there, he met several Navy wives who lived in Villefranche-sur-Mer and spent a lot of their time following their husbands from port to port. This gave him the idea for the movie. The film was made by MGM's British arm, of which Bachmann was production head.

In April 1962 MGM announced the leads would be Connie Francis and Bobby Vee. In May, further cast announcements included Paula Prentiss, Russ Tamblyn and Tom Tully, with Richard Thorpe attached to direct. Jim Hutton was also to star. Ron Randell was cast off the back of his success in MGM's King of Kings. In the end Hutton or Vee did not appear in the final movie.

The film was shot in the south of France and at London's Elstree Studios in August 1962. At the same time, MGM were also making a similar "three girls" romantic comedy featuring a star from Where the Boys Are, Come Fly With Me.

== Reception ==
The Los Angeles Times called it "the least rowdy service comedy I've ever seen." Bosley Crowther of The New York Times said it "lacks sufficient foreground substance to make it anything more than a limp show."
