= The Deadly Hunt =

- Based on: Autumn of a Hunter by Pat Stadley
- Written by: Jerry Ludwig; Eric Bercovici
- Directed by: John Newland
- Starring: Tony Franciosa; Peter Lawford; Jim Hutton
- Music by: Vic Mizzy
- Country of origin: United States
- Original language: English

Production
- Producer: John Newland
- Cinematography: Fred J. Koenekamp
- Editor: Henry Berman
- Running time: 74 minutes

Original release
- Network: CBS
- Release: October 1, 1971

The Deadly Hunt is a 1971 American thriller television film directed by John Newland, starring Tony Franciosa, Peter Lawford, and Jim Hutton.

It was also known as Autumn of a Hunter after the title of the novel on which it was based.

== Plot ==
A married couple are chased by two hunters.

== Cast ==
- Tony Franciosa as Ryan
- Peter Lawford as Mason
- Jim Hutton as Cliff
- Tim McIntire as Peter
- Anjanette Comer as Martha
- Thomas Hauff as Danny

== Reception ==
The Los Angeles Times called it "routine, time killing."
