= Where the Boys Are =

1960 film by Henry Levin

- Theatrical release poster by Reynold Brown
- Directed by: Henry Levin
- Screenplay by: George Wells
- Based on: Where the Boys Are; 1960 novel by Glendon Swarthout
- Produced by: Joe Pasternak
- Starring: Dolores Hart; George Hamilton; Yvette Mimieux; Jim Hutton; Barbara Nichols; Paula Prentiss; Frank Gorshin; Connie Francis
- Cinematography: Robert Bronner
- Edited by: Fredric Steinkamp
- Music by: George Stoll; Pete Rugolo (original dialectic jazz)
- Production company: Euterpe Productions
- Distributed by: Metro-Goldwyn-Mayer
- Release date: December 28, 1960
- Running time: 99 minutes
- Country: United States
- Language: English
- Budget: $2 million (equivalent to $17 million in 2025)
- Box office: $3.5 million (US rentals) (equivalent to $29.1 million in 2025)

Where the Boys Are is a 1960 American CinemaScope romantic comedy film directed by Henry Levin and starring Dolores Hart, George Hamilton, Yvette Mimieux, Jim Hutton, Barbara Nichols, Paula Prentiss, Frank Gorshin, and Connie Francis. The screenplay by George Wells is based on the 1960 novel of the same name by Glendon Swarthout. The plot follows four female college students who spend spring break in Fort Lauderdale, Florida. The title song "Where the Boys Are" was sung by Francis, who played one of the foursome.

Where the Boys Are was one of the first teen films to explore adolescent sexuality and the changing sexual morals and attitudes among American college youth. Aimed at the teen market, it inspired many American college students to head to Fort Lauderdale for their annual spring break. It won Laurel Awards for Best Comedy of the Year and Best Comedy Actress (Prentiss).

== Plot ==
The film mainly focuses on the "coming of age" of four girl students at a Midwestern university during spring vacation. In a class discussion, smart, down-to-earth Merritt Andrews suggests that premarital sex might be something young women should experience. Melanie Tolman, a magnet for young men, loses her virginity on her first date, soon after the young women arrive in Fort Lauderdale, Florida. Tuggle Carpenter seeks to be a "baby-making machine", lacking only a man to join her in marriage. The athletic Angie, who is clueless about romance, rounds out the group.

The girls find their attitudes challenged. Merritt, a freshman, meets suave, darkly handsome Ryder Smith, a senior at Brown University, and realizes she is not ready for sex. Melanie discovers that Franklin, a boy from Yale University who she thought loved her, was only using her for sex. Tuggle quickly fixes her attention on goofy "TV" Thompson, a junior at Michigan State University, but becomes disillusioned when he becomes infatuated with performer Lola Fandango, a "mermaid" swimmer/dancer in a local nightclub. Angie stumbles into a relationship with eccentric jazz musician Basil.

The relationship angst of Merritt, Tuggle, and Angie evaporates when they discover Melanie is distraught after going to meet Franklin at a motel and instead finding there another of the "Yalies", Dill, who raped her. Franklin had moved on to another girl, but told Dill that Melanie was "easy" and set up the ambush. Melanie, her dress torn, walks into traffic. Just as her friends arrive, she is sideswiped by a car and is rushed to the hospital.

Ultimately, the girls resolve to act more maturely and responsibly. After hearing about Melanie, "TV" returns to Tuggle. Angie ends up with Basil, especially after he loses his glasses and needs her help. Melanie recovers in the hospital, with Merritt looking after her. Merritt promises Ryder she will continue their long-distance relationship. He then drives them back to college.

== Cast ==
- Dolores Hart as Merritt Andrews
- Yvette Mimieux as Melanie Tolman
- Paula Prentiss as Tuggle Carpenter
- Connie Francis as Angie
- George Hamilton as Ryder Smith
- Jim Hutton as TV Thompson
- Barbara Nichols as Lola Fandango
- Frank Gorshin as Basil Demotomes
- Chill Wills as police captain
- Rory Harrity as Franklin
- John Brennan as Dill
- Ted Berger as Stout Man on Beach
- Maggie Pierce as Dody (uncredited)
- Carol Byron as Sybil (uncredited)

== Production ==
=== Development ===
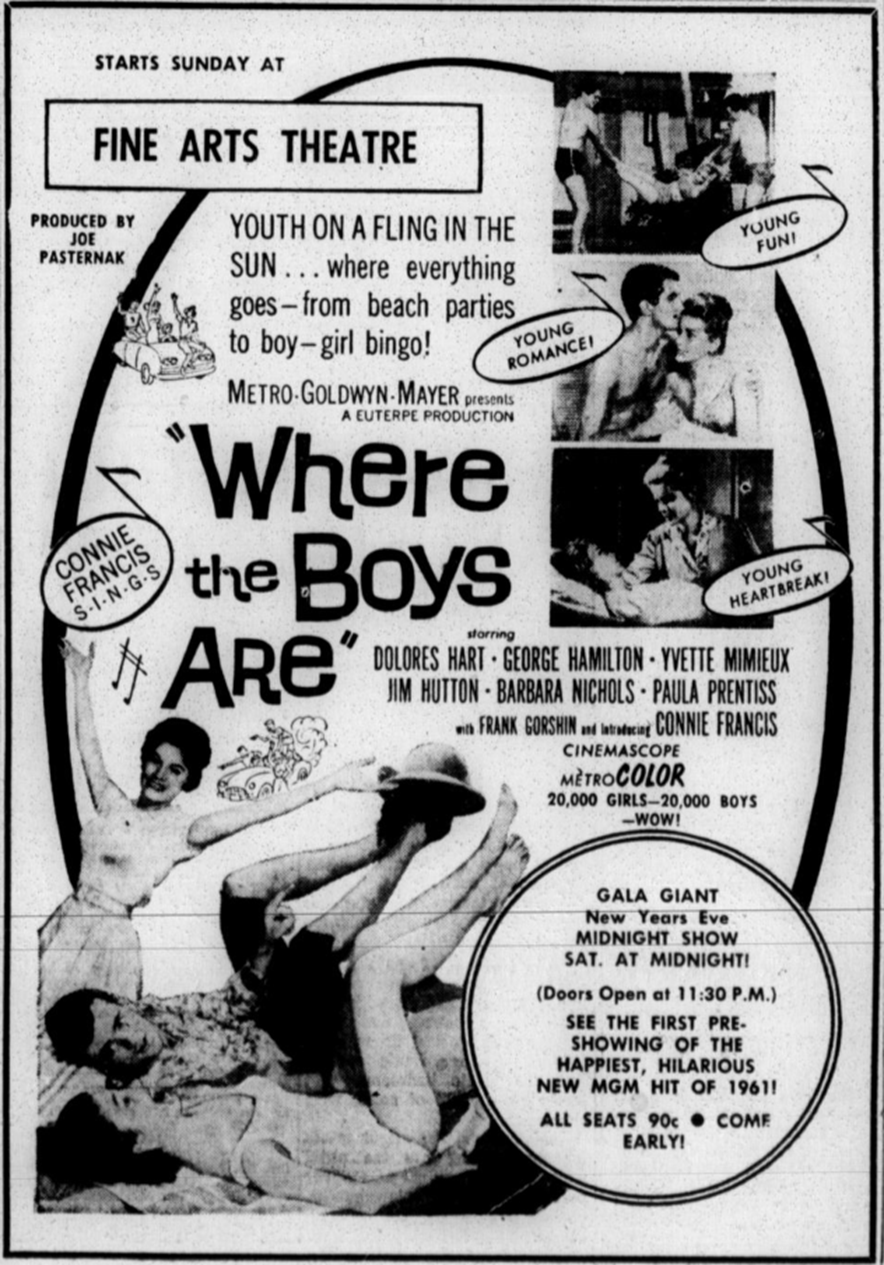
Advertisement from 1960

Joe Pasternak bought the film rights to the novel, which originally was known as Unholy Spring, even before it was published. He assigned George Wells to write the script. MGM paid $100,000 for the rights.

"There isn't a gat, knife, or marijuana cigarette in the whole thing", said Pasternak. "These are good students. We'll use our young contract players, such as George Hamilton, Joe Cronin, Denny Miller, Alfredo Sadel, Bill Smith, Russ Tamblyn, Luana Patten, Maggie Pierce, Carmen Phillips, and Nancy Walters; then get one star to head the cast." Natalie Wood, who had just made All the Fine Young Cannibals for MGM, was mentioned as a possible star at one stage.

MGM eventually persuaded the book's author to change the title from Unholy Spring to Where the Boys Are.

Henry Levin was signed to direct. The first two stars confirmed for the movie were George Hamilton and Yvette Mimieux. Paula Prentiss was cast despite never having made a movie. Connie Francis also made her film debut (although she had previously done voice work in Jamboree! and Rock Rock Rock!). This marked the first of three films starring Francis which featured "boys" in the title. The other two were Follow the Boys and When the Boys Meet the Girls. Jim Hutton had just been signed to MGM.

Joseph Pasternak had reportedly been considering Jane Fonda for the role of Merritt, but Levin recommended Dolores Hart and she wound up being cast.

The novel contained a section where the students raise money to ship arms to Fidel Castro for his revolution in Cuba. Pasternak decided to remove this. "The author was very sympathetic to Castro", said Pasternak. "Politics does not belong in entertainment. As actors or writers or movie makers of any sort, we have a right to our political preferences. But that is why we have secret ballots... We felt that the only revolution these youngsters should be involved in was their personal revolution."

George Hamilton got a bit part for his friend Sean Flynn in the film.

=== Shooting ===
Hamilton claims to have improvised the scene in which he wrote a question mark in the sand next to Dolores Hart. He firmly believed he was making a "little nothing of a film" and did not enjoy the shoot. The film also featured the screen debut, in an uncredited role, by former Miss Ohio and Elvis Presley consort Kathy Gabriel.

The opening sequence was narrated by veteran voice-over artist Paul Frees. Frees is best known for his work on Disneyland attractions, such as The Haunted Mansion and Pirates of the Caribbean.

Levin reportedly developed a crush on Hart during filming. "All I know is I got a lot of close ups," wrote Hart later. The success of the film led to MGM signing Hart to a four picture contract.

== Music ==
The kind of cool modern jazz (or west coast jazz) popularized by such acts as Dave Brubeck, Gerry Mulligan, and Chico Hamilton, then in the vanguard of the college music market, features in a number of scenes with Basil. Called "dialectic jazz" in the film, the original compositions were by Pete Rugolo.

MGM had bolstered the film's success potential by giving a large role to Connie Francis, the top American female recording star and a member of the MGM Records roster. Francis had solicited the services of Neil Sedaka and Howard Greenfield, who had written hit songs for her, to write original material for her to perform on the film's soundtrack including a "Where the Boys Are" title song. Sedaka and Greenfield wrote two potential title songs for the film, but producer Joe Pasternak passed over the song Francis and the songwriting duo preferred in favor of a lush 1950s style movie theme. Francis recorded the song on October 18, 1960, in a New York City recording session with Stan Applebaum arranging and conducting.

The theme song, "Where the Boys Are", peaked at No. 4 in the U.S. and became Connie Francis's signature tune. It was covered by many other artists.

Besides the theme song, Francis sang "Turn on the Sunshine", another Sedaka-Greenfield composition, in the film.

The film's soundtrack also features "Have You Met Miss Fandango?", sung by co-star Barbara Nichols, with music by Victor Young and lyrics by Stella Unger.

MGM did not release a soundtrack album for Where the Boys Are.

== Reception ==
The film was a success at the box office. MGM signed Henry Levin, Dolores Hart, Prentiss and Hutton to long-term contracts.

=== Critical response ===
Variety called it "a potential box office whopper".

American humanities professor Camille Paglia has praised Where the Boys Are for its accurate depiction of courtship and sexuality, illustrating once-common wisdom that she contends has been obscured by second-wave feminism:

The theatrics of public rage over date rape are feminists' way of restoring the old sexual rules that were shattered by my generation. Because nothing about the sexes has really changed. The comic film Where the Boys Are (1960), the ultimate expression of '50s man-chasing, still speaks directly to our time. It shows smart, lively women skillfully anticipating and fending off the dozens of strategies with which horny men try to get them into bed. The agonizing date rape subplot and climax are brilliantly done. The victim, Yvette Mimieux, makes mistake after mistake, obvious to the other girls. She allows herself to be lured from her girlfriends and into isolation with boys whose character and intentions she misreads. Where the Boys Are tells the truth. It shows courtship as a dangerous game in which the signals are not verbal but subliminal.

On the review aggregator website Rotten Tomatoes, 86% of 7 critics' reviews are positive. Metacritic, which uses a weighted average, assigned the film a score of 63 out of 100, based on 7 critics, indicating "generally favorable" reviews.

=== Proposed sequel ===
In 1960, it was announced Pasternak would make a follow-up titled Where the Girls Are, starring George Hamilton. It was meant to be an entirely different story rather than a sequel. But this was never produced.

Pasternak also announced plans to reunite Hamilton, Prentiss, Hutton, and Mimieux in a romantic comedy titled Only a Paper Moon from a story by George Bradshaw, "Image of a Starlet". This became A Ticklish Affair, and was made, but without any of those actors.

Nonetheless, there were a number of unofficial follow-ups. MGM liked Paula Prentiss and Jim Hutton as a team so much they paired them in three more films: Bachelor in Paradise, The Honeymoon Machine and The Horizontal Lieutenant. MGM also made a number of other romantic comedies in the style of Where the Boys Are, including Come Fly with Me and Follow the Boys.

It also inspired a number of imitations from other studios, including the Beach Party series (1963–1967) and Palm Springs Weekend (1963), as well as the 2003 film From Justin to Kelly.

== Remake ==
Where the Boys Are '84 was released in 1984 by TriStar Pictures. While it bears the distinction of being the first film released by TriStar, the film was a critical and commercial failure. Although it was touted as a remake, it was imagined as a sex comedy. In a review of Where the Boys Are '84, Roger Ebert commented, "It isn't a sequel and isn't a remake and isn't, in fact, much of anything."
