= Merry Andrew (film) =

1958 film by Michael Kidd

- Original poster
- Directed by: Michael Kidd
- Screenplay by: Isobel Lennart; I.A.L. Diamond
- Story by: Paul Gallico
- Based on: "The Romance of Henry Menafee"; 1943 story in Good Housekeeping by Paul Gallico
- Produced by: Sol C. Siegel
- Starring: Danny Kaye; Pier Angeli
- Cinematography: Robert Surtees
- Edited by: Harold F. Kress
- Music by: Saul Chaplin
- Distributed by: Metro-Goldwyn-Mayer
- Release dates: February 1958 (Singapore); March 20, 1958 (United States)
- Running time: 103 minutes
- Country: United States
- Languages: English; Italian
- Budget: $2,485,000
- Box office: $3,530,000

Merry Andrew is a 1958 American musical film directed and choreographed by Michael Kidd and starring Danny Kaye. The screenplay by Isobel Lennart and I.A.L. Diamond is based on the short story "The Romance of Henry Menafee" by Paul Gallico. Saul Chaplin composed the music and Johnny Mercer wrote the lyrics for the film's score.

== Plot ==
Andrew Larabee teaches at a school run by his headmaster father Matthew, a traditional man who disapproves of his son's unconventional methods despite their popularity with the students. Andrew's special interest is archaeology, and he hopes to earn his father's respect through this field of study.

During the school holidays, Andrew bicycles to ancient ruins in Sussex where he believes a statue of Pan (which had been left behind by a Roman legion) can be found. Such a discovery would enable him to publish and subsequently wed Letitia Fairchild, his fiancée of five years, who insists he earn a promotion before she marries him. At the site he encounters the Gallini family traveling circus, which has been ordered to pack up and leave by the local police since the land is now property of dairy farmer Lord Elmwood. The five Gallini brothers and their cousin Selena mistake Andrew for a contractor, and when he tells them he doesn't mind if they remain, the Gallinis halt their "pulling up stakes". Lord Elmwood arrives and threatens to remove both Andrew and the circus, but Andrew realizes he's a former fellow Oxford University student with a checkered romantic past. Chastened by Andrew’s subtle threat of blackmail, Lord Elmwood agrees to give Andrew and the Gallinis a week before he starts construction on the land.

Shortly after he has begun his excavations, Andrew discovers a tunnel on the site and burrows through its ceiling and directly into the middle of the lion act during a performance. His amusingly masterful way with the animals impresses Selena, who tells him he is a born entertainer, and she teaches him to juggle. With ringmaster Antonio suffering from laryngitis, Andrew is coaxed into replacing him at the matinee. Unfortunately, Letitia and Andrew's brother Dudley arrive to check on Andrew's progress and decide to attend the circus, so Andrew is disguised as Antonio. Due to needing a lot of padding to fit into Antonio's clothes, Andrew is given a safety life jacket with a whistle, smoke and emergency flares — all of which cause havoc in mid-speech, marking Andrew as a natural clown.

After the performance, Selena is overcome with jealousy at the sight of Andrew and Letitia together, and later follows Andrew into the tunnel. Andrew does some more digging, inadvertently causing a cave-in which traps both of them overnight. The following morning, Angelina the chimpanzee, who is tied to a stake by a rope, attempts to get a banana which has been thrown to her out of her reach. As Angelina pulls on the rope, the stake moves, causing the earth around it to collapse and revealing Andrew and Selena. When Antonio and his sons discover them, they accuse Andrew of improper behavior with their Selena and, to save the family honor, insist the two wed on the following Saturday.

Angelina the chimpanzee then finds the Pan statue Andrew was seeking and conceals it in her cage. Andrew convinces Selena his obligations at school override their wedding plans and he returns home, where he discovers his father has promoted him and Letitia is ready to accept him as her husband — with their marriage having also been set to take place on the following Saturday. On the night before the ceremony, Selena brings Andrew the statue of Pan which Angelina had given to her.

Because Andrew's class has performed well in their last test, the Headmaster has promised them a treat. However, when the boys choose to go to the Gallini Circus, which is due to arrive, Andrew refuses to take them there. So the boys disappear on the day of the wedding, and Andrew tracks them back to the circus. His father and brothers discover the statue of Pan, and Dudley mentions that a circus was in the field in which Andrew was searching for Pan. Accompanied by Letitia and her father, Andrew's father and brothers follow him to the circus where they find Andrew being chased by the Gallini brothers. When Andrew is confronted by two upset families, he finally clears things up and admits that he loves Selena.

Following the wedding ceremony, Andrew and Dudley leave the church arm-in-arm with Letitia. After the happy couple - Dudley and Letitia - drive away on their honeymoon, Matthew gives his blessing to Andrew, saying that Andrew was carrying on a fine family tradition (one of their ancestors, Thomas Larabee, had been a jester in the court of King James the First). A very happy Andrew then leaves with his bride-to-be Selena and the equally happy members of the Gallini family.

== Cast ==
- Danny Kaye as Andrew Larabee
- Pier Angeli as Selena Gallini
- Salvatore Baccaloni as Antonio Gallini
- Patricia Cutts as Letitia Fairchild
- Noel Purcell as Matthew Larabee
- Robert Coote as Dudley Larabee
- Rex Evans as Gregory Larabee
- Tommy Rall as Ugo Gallini
- Walter Kingsford as Mr. Fairchild
- Rhys Williams as police constable

== Songs ==
- "Pipes of Pan" - performed by Danny Kaye and Chorus
- "Chin Up, Stout Fellow" - performed by Danny Kaye with Robert Coote (dubbed by William B. Lee) and Rex Evans (dubbed by Ernest Newton), reprised by The Larabees and Walter Kingsford
- "Everything Is Ticketty-Boo" - performed by Danny Kaye
- "You Can't Always Have What You Want" - performed by Danny Kaye, Pier Angeli (dubbed by Betty Wand) and chorus
- "The Square of the Hypotenuse" - performed by Danny Kaye and chorus
- "Salud (Buona Fortuna)" - performed by Danny Kaye, Salvatore Baccaloni and Pier Angeli (dubbed by Betty Wand), reprised by all at the end

The film's soundtrack was released on compact disc by DRG on July 11, 2006.

== Release ==
The film had its premiere in Singapore in the week of February 20, 1958. It was the first Hollywood premiere of a major film in southeast Asia. It opened at Radio City Music Hall in New York City on March 20, 1958.

== Box office ==
The film grossed $145,000 in its opening week at the Music Hall. It grossed $155,000 the following week when it was shown together with the Hall's Easter stageshow. According to MGM records the film earned theatrical rentals of $1,180,000 in the US and Canada and $2,350,000 elsewhere, recording a loss of $837,000.

== Critical reception ==
Bosley Crowther of The New York Times called the film "what the doctor ordered to help shake the winter blues" and added, "It isn't the most original or inventive vehicle in which the invariable [sic] cheering Mr. Kaye has come bouncing down the road. It is, in fact, a rather obvious and narrowly confined piece of comical contrivance for the genial performer to command...Successively, the scriptwriters and director Michael Kidd put Mr. Kaye through various fumbles...Once in a while, the star is needled into doing a pleasant song...Indeed, it would be most gratifying if there were more of this sort of thing in the show. However, it's ample entertainment."

Variety wrote the film "has a happy-go-chuckley attitude and some of the smartest musical numbers in some time, set up by stand-out music and lyrics. Against this is the fact that the Sol C. Siegel production for Metro does not always maintain its own set of very high comedy values, nor the pace of its initial scenes...Michael Kidd, who makes his screen debut as a director with "Andrew," still has a lot to learn about comedy set-ups and this unsureness is made the more evident by the contrast of the narrative stretches with the brisk and imaginative manner in which Kidd has choreographed the musical numbers. Here he is on experienced ground and he shows it."

== See also ==
- List of American films of 1958
