= The Honeymoon Machine =

1961 film by Richard Thorpe

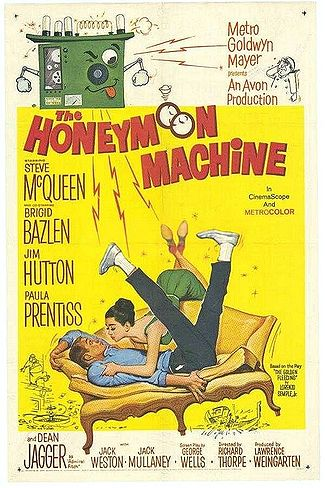
- Theatrical 1961 film release poster by Reynold Brown
- Directed by: Richard Thorpe
- Written by: George Wells
- Based on: The Golden Fleecing by Lorenzo Semple Jr.
- Produced by: Lawrence Weingarten
- Starring: Steve McQueen; Brigid Bazlen; Jim Hutton; Paula Prentiss; Dean Jagger; Jack Weston; Jack Mullaney
- Cinematography: Joseph LaShelle
- Edited by: Ben Lewis
- Music by: Leigh Harline
- Distributed by: Metro-Goldwyn-Mayer
- Release date: August 23, 1961 (New York City)
- Running time: 84 minutes
- Country: United States
- Language: English
- Box office: $2 million

The Honeymoon Machine is a 1961 American comedy film directed by Richard Thorpe and starring Steve McQueen, Brigid Bazlen, Jim Hutton, Paula Prentiss, Jack Mullaney and Dean Jagger, based on the 1959 Broadway play The Golden Fleecing by Lorenzo Semple Jr. In the film, three men devise a plan to win at roulette with a United States Navy computer. The scheme works until an admiral ruins their plans.

== Plot ==
Civilian scientist Jason Eldridge runs the Magnetic Analyzer Computing Synchrotron (MACS), a vacuum tube computer aboard the United States Navy ship USS Elmira. He and his friend Lieutenant Ferguson Howard realize that by using MACS to record a roulette table's spins over time, the computer can predict future results. With Eldridge, Howard and Lieutenant Junior Grade Beauregard Gilliam check into a Venice casino's hotel dressed as civilians, defying Admiral Fitch's order that naval officers on shore avoid the casino and wear uniforms. They plan to use signal lamps to communicate with a confederate manning MACS on the Elmira.

At the hotel, dedicated bachelor Howard meets and romances Julie Fitch, the admiral's daughter (though he is initially unaware of her parentage). Eldridge reunites with former girlfriend and heiress Pam Dunstan, who is in Venice to marry another man. The betting system is very effective, and the three men accumulate hundreds of thousands of dollars in casino chips. The money gives Eldridge the confidence to propose to Dunstan. However, Admiral Fitch sees and investigates their signals. Soon the Navy, the American and Soviet consulates, and Venice city authorities are on alert for a "revolution".

Signalman Burford Taylor finds their signal lamp, so the gamblers get him drunk to detain him, but Taylor escapes and reports to the admiral. Julie Fitch tells her father that she and Howard have "got to marry" each other to save him from court-martial. The Soviets accuse the Navy of using MACS to steal from the casino. To avoid an international incident, Howard agrees to intentionally lose all his chips on his last bet, but a brawl breaks out between Soviets, Americans and Italians in the casino over the chips. The movie ends with newlyweds Howard and Fitch celebrating their honeymoon in the hotel.

== Cast ==
- Steve McQueen as Lt. Ferguson 'Fergie' Howard. McQueen was second choice for this role, after Cary Grant turned the part down.
- Brigid Bazlen as Julie Fitch
- Jim Hutton as Jason Eldridge
- Paula Prentiss as Pam Dunstan
- Dean Jagger as Admiral Fitch
- Jack Weston as Signalman Burford Taylor
- Jack Mullaney as Lt. Beauregard 'Beau' Gilliam
- Marcel Hillaire as Inspector of casino games
- Ben Astar as Russian consul
- William Lanteau as Tommy Dane
- Ken Lynch as Capt. James Angle
- Simon Scott as Capt. Harvey Adam

== Production ==
Jim Hutton and Paula Prentiss had just appeared together in Where the Boys Are.

== Reception ==
=== Critical ===
Bosley Crowther, critic for The New York Times was unimpressed, writing, "It is a wild and labored operation, and when it finally comes to an end, one wonders whether it has even been bona fide farce." He did, however, appreciate the efforts of the main cast: "It profits by pleasant performers. Jim Hutton, Jack Mullaney and Steve McQueen work hard as the three connivers." Filmink wrote "Prentiss is a stand-out as the short-sighted heiress determined to nab Hutton come what may (reminiscent of Allison Janney) – they do steal the film from McQueen and Bazlen, but those two are no slouches either."

Steve McQueen walked out of the first public sneak preview and vowed never to work for MGM again, despite being under contractual obligation for two more pictures.

=== Box Office ===
According to MGM records, the film made a profit of $122,000.

== See also ==
- List of American films of 1961
