= Barefoot in the Park (disambiguation) =

Barefoot in the Park is a romantic comedy by Neil Simon.

Barefoot in the Park may also refer to:

- Barefoot in the Park (film)
- Barefoot in the Park (TV series)
- "Barefoot in the Park" (song)
