= Barefoot in the Park (TV series) =

- Genre: Sitcom
- Developed by: Bill Idelson; Harvey Miller
- Written by: William Bickley; Alan Mandel; Charles Shyer
- Directed by: Bruce Bilson; Jerry Paris; Charles R. Rondeau
- Starring: Scoey Mitchell; Tracy Reed; Thelma Carpenter; Nipsey Russell; Harry Holcombe; Vito Scotti
- Theme music composer: Neal Hefti
- Composers: Charles Fox; J. J. Johnson
- Country of origin: United States
- Original language: English
- No. of seasons: 1
- No. of episodes: 12

Production
- Executive producer: William P. D'Angelo
- Running time: 22–24 minutes
- Production company: Paramount Television

Original release
- Network: ABC
- Release: September 24 – December 17, 1970

Related
- Barefoot in the Park

Barefoot in the Park is an American sitcom that aired in 1970 on ABC. Based on Neil Simon's Broadway play of the same name, the series cast members are predominantly black, making it the first American television sitcom since Amos 'n' Andy to have a predominantly black cast (Vito Scotti is the sole major white character). Barefoot in the Park had been a 1967 film starring Robert Redford and Jane Fonda.

== Synopsis ==
Scoey Mitchell plays Paul Bratter, a newlywed attorney for the law firm Kendricks, Keene & Klein living in lower Manhattan with his wife Corie (played by Tracy Reed). The show was a slice-of-life comedy about surviving in New York City. Other regulars included Thelma Carpenter as Corie's mother, Mable Bates, Harry Holcombe as Mr. Kendricks, Vito Scotti as Mr. Velasquez, and Nipsey Russell as local pool hall owner, Honey Robinson.

== Guest stars ==
Dead End Kids alumnus Huntz Hall and actor Jackie Coogan appeared on the 10th episode, aired December 3, 1970, titled Disorder in the Court (which gets its title from the 1936 Three Stooges short). Penny Marshall made one of her early television appearances on the fourth episode of the series, aired October 5, 1970, titled "In Sickness and in Health". Marshall's later co-star of the mid-1970s television success Laverne & Shirley, Cindy Williams, appeared on the sixth episode, which aired on October 29, 1970, titled "The Marriage Proposal".

== Cancellation ==
When Barefoot in The Park premiered on Thursday, September 24, 1970, at 9 p.m., it was the lead-in program for another series based on a Neil Simon play, The Odd Couple, which debuted immediately afterward. Because both comedies followed ABC’s popular series Bewitched, which aired the same evening at 8:30 p.m., it was hoped that the long-running sitcom would provide a strong ratings segue for both series. However, Bewitched was in its seventh season and experiencing a ratings slump. As a result, viewership for both Barefoot in the Park and The Odd Couple was disappointing.

In the case of Barefoot in the Park, there was also behind-the-scenes strife. Star Scoey Mitchell was fired due to "differences of opinion" with the series' producers. By this time, only 12 episodes of the sitcom had been produced. Rather than replace Mitchell with another actor and disenchanted with the low ratings, ABC decided to cancel Barefoot in the Park in December, 1970. In January 1971, the network moved The Odd Couple to Friday nights where its ratings improved. Despite the fact that it never placed in the top 30 television shows, The Odd Couple had a five-year run on ABC and won Emmy Awards for its two stars Tony Randall and Jack Klugman. The installments of Barefoot in the Park were rerun as episodes of Love, American Style in syndication.

== Production notes ==
The show was produced by William P. D'Angelo, and various episodes were written or directed by much of the same team that had developed The Odd Couple (Jerry Paris, Harvey Miller, Bruce Bilson and Garry Marshall). Director Charles Rondeau also had directed almost the entire first half of the first season of the American sitcom F-Troop, which also aired on ABC.

== Episodes ==
No.	Title	Directed by	Written by	Original release date
1	"Pilot"	Bruce Bilson	Bill Idelson & Harvey Miller	September 24, 1970
A fledgling lawyer and his unpredictable bride set up housekeeping in a run-down Manhattan walk-up.
2	"The Bed"	Jerry Paris	Jerry Belson & Garry Marshall	October 1, 1970
Paul and Corie buy a bed from Honey's friend -- and it collapses as soon as they get it home.
3	"You'll Never Walk Alone"	Jerry Paris	Susan Harris	October 8, 1970
Paul gets himself into trouble when he attends a charity auction party where Corie will be modelling an expensive dress. Natalie Schafer guest stars.
4	"In Sickness and in Health"	Jerry Paris	William Bickley	October 15, 1970
Paul helps a pregnant neighbor to the hospital, where he is mistaken for a patient. Penny Marshall guest stars.
5	"You Gotta Have Soul"	Charles R. Rondeau	Charles Shyer & Alan Mandel	October 22, 1970
Paul hires an incompetent secretary who redecorates his office with Mod-Afro decor. Alley Mills guest stars.
6	"The Marriage Proposal"	Unknown	William Bickley	October 29, 1970
Flashbacks take Paul down memory lane as he tells Honey Robinson (Nipsey Russell) how he proposed to Corie and why she bit him in return. Cindy Williams guest stars.
7	"Down With the Landlord"	Charles R. Rondeau	Stanley Ralph Ross	November 5, 1970
Paul and the other defendants are dissatisfied with conditions in their apartment building. They decide to take their grievances to the landlord but when Paul finds out it's Sugar Ray Robinson, he has second thoughts. Davis Roberts, Ron Feinberg and Sugar Ray Robinson guest star.
8	"Something Fishy"	Bruce Bilson	Richard DeRoy	November 12, 1970
When Corie's aunt comes to visit, Paul and Honey go fishing, only to get themselves arrested. Lillian Hayman and Scatman Crothers guest star.
9	"Corie's Rear Window"	Charles R. Rondeau	Jack Winter	November 19, 1970
Corie tries to prove to Paul that she saw a man killed in the apartment across the street. Avery Schreiber and Richard X. Slattery guest star.
10	"Disorder in the Court"	Charles R. Rondeau	David Ketchum & Bruce Shelly	December 3, 1970
Paul is reluctant to help Mabel (Thelma Carpenter) when she is sued by a crooked cabbie. Tol Avery, Jackie Coogan and Huntz Hall guest star.
11	"No Fancy Fixture"	Unknown	Barry E. Blitzer & Ray Brenner	December 10, 1970
Corie bought an inflatable chair that won't inflate, so Paul goes after the shifty shopowner who sold it to her. Herb Edelman guest stars.
12	"Nothing But the Truth"	Charles R. Rondeau	Charles Shyer & Alan Mandel	December 17, 1970
After attending a sensitivity group, Corie decides that she and Paul must always be honest with each other in all respects-- even when the boss comes to dinner. Doris Packer and Severn Darden guest star.
