= Call Her Mom =

1972 American TV movie

- Genre: Comedy
- Written by: Gail Parent; Kenny Solms
- Directed by: Jerry Paris
- Starring: Connie Stevens; Thelma Carpenter; John David Carson
- Country of origin: United States
- Original language: English

Production
- Executive producers: Wilford Lloyd Baumes; Douglas S. Cramer
- Producer: Herb Wallerstein
- Cinematography: Emil Oster
- Editors: Jim Faris; Robert Moore
- Running time: 73 minutes
- Production companies: Douglas S. Cramer Company; Screen Gems

Original release
- Network: ABC
- Release: February 15, 1972

Call Her Mom is a 1972 American TV movie produced by Screen Gems. It was the pilot for a proposed series that was not picked up. It instead premiered on February 15, 1972, as a stand-alone film, and as an installment of The ABC Movie of the Week. The movie was a huge ratings success.

== Plot ==
A waitress becomes housemother for a college fraternity. The setting is Beardsley College, where Alpha Rho Epsilon House (the Greek letters are APE) is a party-all-the-time fraternity. The housemother has quit because she cannot control their wild behavior. Twelve other housemothers had left before her.

Connie Stevens enters as a waitress fed up with her job. She loudly quits during a busy rush at the restaurant. The fraternity brothers witness her quitting and offer her a job as housemother.

The fraternity members expect that she will be lenient, but she takes her role as housemother seriously and lays down the law. She also gets involved with the national women's liberation movement, which causes a rift with the conservative college president, played by Van Johnson. Beardsley College experiences picketing and protests like other American universities in 1972.

Mini-skirt clad Connie Stevens sings "Come On-a My House" and provides the sexual tension in the all-male fraternity. Jim Hutton and Charles Nelson Reilly are the co-stars. Mike Evans, who co-starred in All in the Family and The Jeffersons as Lionel Jefferson, also appeared as a fraternity member.

== Cast ==
- Connie Stevens as Angie Bianco
- Thelma Carpenter as Ida
- John David Carson as Woody Guinness III
- Gloria DeHaven as Helen Hardgrove
- Mike Evans as Wilson (as Mike Jonas Evans)
- Jim Hutton as Prof. Jonathan Calder
- Van Johnson as President Chester Hardgrove
- Corbett Monica as Bruno
- Charles Nelson Reilly as Dean Walden
- Steve Vinovich as Randall Feigelbaum
- William Tepper as Roscoe
- Herbert Rudley as Mr. Guiness
- Maudie Prickett as Mrs. Gibbons
- Alfie Wise as Jeremy

== Production ==
Connie Stevens and Jim Hutton had both been contract stars in the 1960s and previously appeared together in Never Too Late (1965).

== Reception ==
=== Ratings ===
The TV movie was a huge ratings success, earning a 30.9 rating and a 46 audience share, making it the second highest show of the week after All in the Family. It was the eighth most widely seen film on television, after Ben Hur, The Birds, The Bridge on the River Kwai, The Night Stalker, Brian's Song, Women in Chains, and Born Free (the ninth and tenth were A Death of Innocence and The Feminist and the Fuzz).

The film was repeated in 1973 and was the 12th most popular show of the week.

=== Critical ===
The Los Angeles Times, however, thought the movie was poor and the cast "wasted".

== Follow up ==
ABC next cast Connie Stevens in the TV movie Playmates, co-starring Alan Alda. This was another large success, ranking among the 20 most viewed films on TV for a time.
