= Scoey Mitchell =

American actor, writer and TV director (1930–2022)

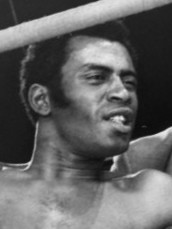
- Mitchell as a boxer on an episode of TV's; That Girl, 1969
- Born: Roscoe Mitchell Jr. March 12, 1930; Newburgh, New York, U.S.
- Died: March 19, 2022 (aged 92); Torrance, California, U.S.
- Other name: Scoey Mitchell
- Occupations: Actor; director; producer; writer
- Years active: 1967–1990
- Spouse: Claire T. Thomas (m. 1973)
- Relatives: Billy Mitchell (brother)

Roscoe Mitchell Jr. or Scoey Mitchell (March 12, 1930 – March 19, 2022), usually credited as Scoey Mitchell, was an American actor, producer, writer and television director known for frequent appearances on 1970s game shows, including Match Game and Tattletales. He starred in the short-lived series Barefoot in the Park (based on the Neil Simon play) and had a recurring role on Rhoda.

He created two short-lived NBC television series, Me and Mrs. C and 13 East. He appeared as Richard Pryor's father in the film Jo Jo Dancer, Your Life Is Calling.

== Early life and career ==
Mitchell was born on March 12, 1930, in Newburgh, New York, as Roscoe Mitchlll Jr. (the surname had three "L"s, and no "E"). His father was a Baptist minister and community activist. His brother was jazz pianist Billy Mitchell. He started his career on The Smothers Brothers Comedy Hour in 1967. He appeared in What's It All About, World? as himself in 1969.

He guest-starred in television series including The Mothers-in-Law, Here Come the Brides, That Girl, The Odd Couple, The Six Million Dollar Man, and Baretta.

Mitchell starred in several television films, including Voyage of the Yes, Cops, and Cindy. He also turned to directing television with the film Me & Mrs. C. in 1984 and episodes of 13 East in 1989–90. Mitchell wrote for television, including The Scoey Mitchell Show in 1972, Just a Little More Love in 1983, and Handsome Harry's. In addition, he ventured into production of television and television films, including Grambling's White Tiger in 1981, Gus Brown and Midnight Brewster in 1985, and Miracle at Beekman's Place in 1988.

Mitchell also was on a number of television shows as himself, including Match Game from 1974 to 1979, Super Password in 1988, The Joey Bishop Show 1968–69, Hollywood Squares in 1968, and Tattletales from 1974 to 1978 and from 1982 to 1984. He guest starred on an episode of Taxi titled "Memories of Cab 804, Part 1" (1978) during the first season and his name was in the end credits as "Scoey Mitchell" (a letter 'l' replaced the letter 'e'). Interestingly, during a recurring role on the series Rhoda, Mitchell’s name was credited as “SCOEY MITCHLLL” (an ‘L’ replacing the letter ‘E’) on the end credits of S01E23, “A Nice Warm Rut.”

In September 1970, ABC cast Mitchell in Barefoot in the Park based on Neil Simon's Broadway play of the same name. The series cast members were predominantly black, making it the first American television sitcom since Amos 'n' Andy to have a predominantly black cast (Vito Scotti was the sole major white character). Barefoot in the Park had been a successful 1967 film starring Robert Redford and Jane Fonda. It was thought by ABC that placing Barefoot in the Park behind Bewitched would do well, but because that show was already in a slump, Barefoot in the Park never developed high numbers for the network. During its first few episodes, Barefoot in the Park developed behind-the-scenes strife that sealed its fate: Mitchell was fired due to "differences of opinion" with the series' producers. Rather than replace Mitchell with another actor—and already disenchanted with the low ratings—ABC decided to cancel Barefoot in the Park in December 1970.

In 1986, Mitchell was in Jo Jo Dancer, Your Life Is Calling, a semi-autobiographical film about Richard Pryor. In 2017, after a hiatus of almost thirty years, he returned to acting, in a one-off role in A Kindred Soul.

== Death ==
Mitchell died of kidney failure on March 19, 2022, in a hospice-care facility in Torrance, California. He was survived by his wife, Claire.

== Filmography ==
=== Acting ===
==== Film ====
Year	Title	Role	Notes
1986	Jo Jo Dancer, Your Life Is Calling	Father	Semi-autobiographical; directed by Richard Pryor.

==== Television ====
Year	Title	Role	Episode(s)	Notes
1965	Get Smart			Credited as Scoey Mitchell
1967	The Smothers Brothers Comedy Hour	Himself	"Episode #2.12" (S2:Ep 12)	Credited as Scoey Mitchell
1968	The Smothers Brothers Comedy Hour	Himself	"Episode #2.17" (S2:Ep 17)	Credited as Scoey Mitchell
1968	The Smothers Brothers Comedy Hour	Himself	"Episode #2.24" (S2:Ep 24)	Credited as Scoey Mitchell
1969	What's It All About, World?	Himself		Contract role
1969	The Mothers-in-Law	Solomon Elkins	"Guess Who's Coming Forever" (S2:Ep 20)	Credited as Scoey Mitchell
1969	Here Come the Brides	Sheriff Bond	"Far Cry from Yesterday" (S2:Ep 1)	
1969	The Carol Burnett Show	Himself	"Episode #3.4" (S3:Ep 4)	
1969	That Girl	Tony Harris	"Shake Hands and Come Out Acting" (S4:Ep 9)	Credited as Scoey Mitchell
1970	Barefoot in the Park	Paul Bratter		Contract role; credited as Scoey Mitchell
1972	The Odd Couple	Consul from Nigeria	"The Princess" (S3:Ep 3)	Uncredited
1973	Voyage of the Yes	Pretty	Television film	Directed by Lee H. Katzin.
1973	Cops	Sergeant Monroe Dupree	Television film	Credited as "Scoey Mitchell"; Directed and written by Jerry Belson.
1974	The Six Million Dollar Man	Major Chooka	"Little Orphan Airplane" (S1:Ep 5)	Credited as Scoey Mitchell
1974–76	Rhoda	Justin Culp	Recurring	Credited as Scoey Mitchell
1975	Joe Forrester	Guest	Pilot: "Stake Out"	
1975	Police Story	Investigator Mal Groves	"The Execution" (S2:Ep 18) "The Cut Man Caper" (S3:Ep 5)	
1976	Doc	The Father	"And Baby Makes Eight" (S1:Ep 16)	
1977	Baretta	Mike	"Playin' Police" (S3:Ep 24)	Credited as Scoey Mitchell
1978	Cindy	Cindy's father	Television film	Directed by William Graham.
1978	Baretta	Aterna	"The Bundle" (S4:Ep 24)	
1978	Taxi	Robber	"Memories of Cab 804: Part 1" (S1:Ep 11)	Credited as Scoey Mitchell
1979	Lou Grant	Minister	"Skids" (S2:Ep 23)	Credited as Scoey Mitchell
1979	Just Friends	Guest	"Room at the Top" (S1:Ep 8)	
1979	A New Kind of Family	Carl Ashton	"Thank You for a Lovely Evening" (S1:Ep 7)	
1979	Password Plus	Guest	Air date April 2, 1979, with Lee Meriwether	Credited as Scoey Mitchell
1985	Gus Brown and Midnight Brewster	Maurice	Television film	Directed by James Fargo.
1985	Handsome Harry's	Harry Marquette	Television film	Credited as "Scoey Mitchell"; Directed by Bill Foster.
1986	Me & Mrs. C.	Reverend Kilgore	"Ladies' Choice: Part 1" (S1:Ep 2) "Ladies' Choice: Part 2" (S1:Ep 3)	
1986	Miracle at Beekman's Place	Dr Cyrus Beekman	Television film	Directed by Bernard L. Kowalski and written by Mitchell.

=== Directing ===
==== Television ====
Year	Title	Production Type	Episodes	Notes
1984	Me & Mrs. C.	M Television film		Co-directed with Drew R. Handley
1987	Me & Mrs. C.	TV series	"The Jailbird" (S2:Ep 2) "Happy Birthday to You" (S2:Ep 3) "A Bump in the Night" (S2:Ep 12) "Smarty Pants" (S2:Ep 13)	
1989–90	13 East	TV series	Pilot: "Where's the Ticket?" (S1:Ep 1) "I've Got a Loan to Pick with You" (S1:Ep 2) "A Day in the Life" (S1:Ep 3) "The Switch" (S1:Ep 4) "Tabloid Time" (S1:Ep 5) "Poppa's Coming" (S1:Ep 6) "Bullseye" (S2:Ep 10)	

=== Writing ===
==== Television ====
Year	Title	Production Type	Directed by	Notes
1972	The Scoey Mitchell Show	Television film	Marc Breslow	
1983	Just a Little More Love	Television film	Burt Brinckerhoff	
1984	Me & Mrs. C.	Television film	Co-directed with Drew R. Handley	
1985	Gus Brown and Midnight Brewster	Television film	James Fargo	Story by Mitchell and Martin Rips; teleplay by Mitchell.
1985	Handsome Harry's	Television film	Bill Foster	Co-written and story by Mitchell with Calvin Kelly and James Tisdale (credited as Jim Tisdale).
1986	Me & Mrs. C.	Television series		Episodes: Pilot: "Moving in and Moving Out" (S1:Ep 1); "Ladies' Choice: Part 2" (S1:Ep 3); "The Checks Are in the Mail" (S1:Ep 4); "The Lottery" (S1:Ep 5); "Let's Have a Party" (S1:Ep 6)
1988	A Whole Lotta Fun	Television film		Co-written with Cassandra Clark, James Hampton, Tracy Morgan, Deborah Pearl (credited as Debbie Pearl), Steve Robertson, and John Vornholt.
1988	Miracle at Beekman's Place	Television film	Bernard L. Kowalski	

=== Production ===
==== Television ====
Year	Title	Production Type	Credited as	Notes
1981	Grambling's White Tiger	Television film	Associate producer	Directed by Georg Stanford Brown
1983	Just a Little More Love	Television film	Executive producer	
1984	Me & Mrs. C.	Television film	Producer	
1985	Gus Brown and Midnight Brewster	Television film	Producer	
1985	Handsome Harry's	Television film	Executive producer	
1986	Me & Mrs. C.	Television series	Producer	
1988	A Whole Lotta Fun	Television film	Executive producer	
1988	Miracle at Beekman's Place	Television film	Producer	
1989	13 East	Television series	Producer	
