= Jerry Paris =

American actor and director (1925–1986)

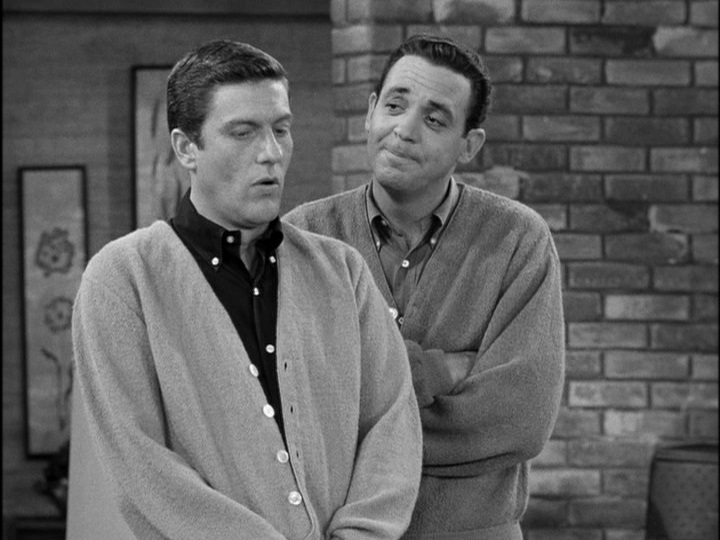
- Paris (right) alongside Dick Van Dyke on The Dick Van Dyke Show
- Born: William Gerald Paris; July 25, 1925; San Francisco, California, U.S.
- Died: March 31, 1986 (aged 60); Los Angeles, California, U.S.
- Education: New York University; UCLA; The Actors Lab; Actors Studio
- Occupations: Actor; director
- Years active: 1949–1986
- Spouse: Ruth Benjamin (m. 1954; died 1980)
- Children: 3

William Gerald Paris (July 25, 1925 – March 31, 1986) was an American actor and director best known for playing Jerry Helper, the dentist and next-door neighbor of Rob and Laura Petrie on The Dick Van Dyke Show, and for directing the majority of the episodes of the sitcom Happy Days.

== Early life ==
Paris was born on July 25, 1925, in San Francisco, California to a Jewish family. His parents were Samuel Aaron Paris and Esther Mohl. His mother subsequently married Milton Grossman when Paris was a small child, but Paris never legally adopted his stepfather's surname.

After serving in the United States Navy during World War II, he attended New York University and the Actors Studio in New York City. After graduating, Paris moved to Los Angeles, where he attended UCLA and studied acting at the Actors Lab in Hollywood.

== Career ==
Paris had roles in films such as The Caine Mutiny, The Wild One and Marty. He also played Martin "Marty" Flaherty, one of Eliot Ness's men, in a recurring role in the first season of ABC-TV's The Untouchables, as well as making guest appearances on other television series. From 1961 to 1966, Paris played the recurring character of dentist Jerry Helper, next-door neighbor and friend of Rob and Laura Petrie on The Dick Van Dyke Show, appearing in 39 of 158 episodes. In 1963, Carl Reiner, the show's creator and producer, gave Paris his first chance to direct one of the episodes. He soon became one of the show's regular directors and won a Primetime Emmy Award in 1964 for Outstanding Directorial Achievement in Comedy for the series. Paris subsequently devoted himself to directing in both film and television, including The Partridge Family, Here's Lucy (including the third season opener featuring Elizabeth Taylor and Richard Burton), and Happy Days, for which he directed 237 of the show's 255 episodes. Imitating Alfred Hitchcock, he appeared uncredited in at least one episode of every season.

He directed two features for NGP, How Sweet It Is and The Grasshopper.

Paris also directed episodes of Laverne & Shirley, The Odd Couple, The Mary Tyler Moore Show, The Ted Knight Show, and Blansky's Beauties. He returned to directing feature films in 1985's Police Academy 2: Their First Assignment and 1986's Police Academy 3: Back in Training. In all, he is credited with directing episodes of 57 TV titles and acting in 105 titles.

== Personal life and death ==
Paris married Ruth Lincoln Benjamin in Santa Barbara, California, on December 19, 1954. They had three children, Tony, Julie and Andy. They remained married until her death on August 13, 1980, in Los Angeles, California, at age 51.

On March 18, 1986, Paris was hospitalized at Cedars-Sinai Medical Center, where doctors discovered a brain tumor. He underwent two surgeries, but doctors were unable to remove the tumor. Paris remained hospitalized until his death on March 31 at age 60. A private memorial was held at Paris's home in Pacific Palisades on April 2.

== Filmography ==
=== Actor ===
- The Lady Gambles (1949) as Horse Player (uncredited)
- Sword in the Desert (1949) as Levitan (uncredited)
- Battleground (1949) as German Sergeant (uncredited)
- My Foolish Heart (1949) as Usher at Football Game
- Woman in Hiding (1950) as Customer at Newsstand (uncredited)
- DOA (1950) as Bellhop (uncredited)
- The Reformer and the Redhead (1950) as Radio Station Call Boy (uncredited)
- Outrage (1950) as Frank Marini
- Cyrano de Bergerac (1950) as Cadet
- The Flying Missile (1950) as Crewman Andy Mason
- Frenchie (1950) as Perry (uncredited)
- Call Me Mister (1951) as Air Force Pilot in Skit (uncredited)
- Her First Romance (1951) as Camp Counsellor (uncredited)
- Bright Victory (1951) as Reynolds, the Medic (uncredited)
- Submarine Command (1951) as Sergeant Gentry
- Monkey Business (1952) as Scientist (uncredited)
- Bonzo Goes to College (1952) as Lefty Edwards
- The Glass Wall (1953) as Tom
- Sabre Jet (1953) as Captain Bert Flanagan
- Flight to Tangier (1953) as Policeman in Car (uncredited)
- The Wild One (1953) as Dextro (uncredited)
- Drive a Crooked Road (1954) as Phil
- Prisoner of War (1954) as Axel Horstrom
- The Caine Mutiny (1954) as Ensign Barney Harding
- About Mrs. Leslie (1954) as Mr. Harkness (uncredited)
- Unchained (1955) as Joe Ravens
- Marty (1955) as Tommy
- Not as a Stranger (1955) as Thompson (uncredited)
- The Naked Street (1955) as Latzi Franks
- Crossroads in "With All My Love" (1955) as Corporal Reynolds
- The View from Pompey's Head (1955) as Ian Garrick
- Good Morning, Miss Dove (1955) as Maurice Levine
- Hell's Horizon (1955) as Corporal Pete Kinshaw
- Crusader (CBS, 1956) as Barney
- Never Say Goodbye (1956) as Joe
- Alfred Hitchcock Presents (1956) (Season 1 Episode 26: "Whodunit") as Wally Benson
- D-Day the Sixth of June (1956) as Raymond Boyce
- I've Lived Before (1956) as Russell Smith, Copilot
- Hey, Jeannie! (1956) as Joe Grady
- Those Whiting Girls (1957) as Artie the Accompanist / Artie
- Zero Hour! (1957) as Tony Decker
- The Silent Service (1957) as Capt. Richard O'Kane (3 episodes)
- Man on the Prowl (1957) as Woody
- Alfred Hitchcock Presents (1958) (Season 3 Episode 36: "The Safe Place") as Fred Piper
- Colt .45 in "Blood Money" (1958) as Joe Bullock
- The Female Animal (1958) as Hank Galvez (not Lopez)
- The Lady Takes a Flyer (1958) as Willie Ridgely
- Sing, Boy, Sing (1958) as Arnold Fisher
- The Naked and the Dead (1958) as Goldstein
- No Name on the Bullet (1959) as Harold Miller
- Steve Canyon (1959) as Maj. 'Willie' Williston
- Career (1959) as Allan Burke
- The Untouchables (1959-1960) as Agent Martin Flaherty
- The Alaskans in "Peril at Caribou Crossing" (1960) as Walter Collier
- The Great Impostor (1961) as Defense Lieutenant
- Michael Shayne (1960-1961) as Tim Rourke
- 77 Sunset Strip (1961) in "Big Boy Blue" as Tom Gardiner
- The Dick Van Dyke Show (1961-1966) as Jerry Helper / Jack Sullivan / TV Newsman
- The Lloyd Bridges Show (1962) in episode "Big Man, Little Bridge"
- The Caretakers (1963) as Passerby Lorna Bumps on Street (uncredited)
- The Eleventh Hour as Marty Kane in "What Did She Mean by Good Luck?" (1963)
- The Fugitive (1963) as Jim Prestwick
- Don't Raise the Bridge, Lower the River (1968) as Baseball Umpire
- Never a Dull Moment (1968) as Police Photographer (uncredited)
- But I Don't Want to Get Married! (1970) as Harry
- Evil Roy Slade (1972) as Souvenir Salesman (uncredited)
- Every Man Needs One (1972) as Marty Ranier
- Leo and Loree (1980) as Tony
- Police Academy 3: Back in Training (1986) as Priest in Police Line-up (uncredited) (final film role)

=== Director ===
- The Silent Service, two episodes (1957)
- The Joey Bishop Show (1961)
- The Dick Van Dyke Show (1963–66) (TV series, 84 episodes)
- The Farmer's Daughter (1963)
- The Munsters (1964)
- Don't Raise the Bridge, Lower the River (1968)
- That Girl (1966) (TV series, pilot)
- Hey, Landlord (1966–67) (TV series)
- Sheriff Who? (1967) (TV series, pilot)
- Never a Dull Moment (1968)
- How Sweet It Is! (1968)
- Here's Lucy (1968) (TV series)
- Love, American Style (1969)
- Viva Max! (1969)
- The Partridge Family (1970) (TV series, pilot)
- The Grasshopper (1970)
- McCloud (1970)
- The Mary Tyler Moore Show (1970)
- The Odd Couple (1970–75) (TV series, 19 episodes)
- Barefoot in the Park (1970) (TV series)
- But I Don't Want to Get Married! (1970) (TV)
- The Feminist and the Fuzz (1971) (TV)
- The New Dick Van Dyke Show (1971)
- Two on a Bench (1971) (TV)
- What's a Nice Girl Like You...? (1971) (TV)
- Star Spangled Girl (1971) (TV)
- Call Her Mom (1972) (TV)
- Evil Roy Slade (1972) (TV)
- Wednesday Night Out (1972) (TV pilot)
- Keeping Up with the Joneses (1972) (TV pilot)
- The Couple Takes a Wife (1972) (TV)
- Every Man Needs One (1972) (TV)
- Thicker than Water (1973) (TV series)
- Break Up (1973) (TV special)
- Happy Days (1974–84) (TV series, 237 episodes)
- Only with Married Men (1974) (TV)
- The Fireman's Ball (1975) (TV pilot)
- When Things Were Rotten (1975) (TV series)
- Good Heavens (1976) (TV series)
- How to Break Up a Happy Divorce (1976) (TV)
- Blansky's Beauties (1977) (TV series)
- The Ted Knight Show (1978) (TV series)
- Make Me an Offer (1980) (TV)
- Leo and Loree (1980)
- Police Academy 2: Their First Assignment (1985)
- Police Academy 3: Back in Training (1986)
- You Again? (1986) (TV series)
