= But I Don't Want to Get Married! =

- Genre: Comedy
- Written by: Roland Wolpert
- Directed by: Jerry Paris
- Starring: Herschel Bernardi; Shirley Jones; Brandon Cruz; Nanette Fabray; June Lockhart
- Theme music composer: George Duning
- Country of origin: United States
- Original language: English

Production
- Producers: Jerry Paris; Aaron Spelling
- Cinematography: Fleet Southcott
- Editor: Aaron Stell
- Running time: 74 min.
- Production company: Aaron Spelling Productions

Original release
- Network: ABC
- Release: October 6, 1970

But I Don't Want to Get Married! is a 1970 American made-for-television comedy film starring Herschel Bernardi, Shirley Jones, Brandon Cruz, Nanette Fabray and June Lockhart. It was broadcast on October 6, 1970 in the ABC Movie of the Week space.

== Plot ==
A widower meets a bunch of women who want to get married.

== Cast ==
- Herschel Bernardi as Walter Benjamin
- Shirley Jones as Evelyn Harris
- Brandon Cruz as Bernard
- Nanette Fabray as Mrs. Vale
- June Lockhart as Hope
- Tina Louise as Miss Spencer
- Sue Lyon as Laura
- Harry Morgan as Mr. Good
- Joyce Van Patten as Olga
- Kay Medford as Hallie
- Kathleen Freeman as Mrs. Borg
- Jerry Paris as Harry
