= Thelma Carpenter =

American singer (1922–1997)

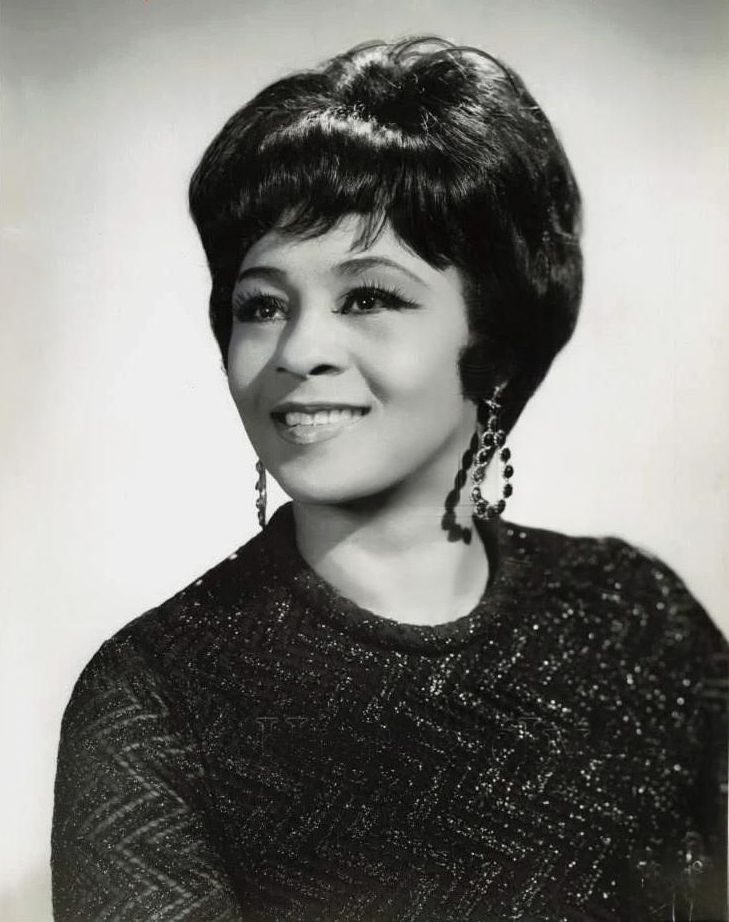

Background information
- Born: January 15, 1922; Brooklyn, New York, U.S.
- Origin: United States
- Died: May 14, 1997 (aged 75) New York City, U.S.
- Genre: Jazz
- Occupations: Singer actress
- Instrument: Vocals
- Years active: 1932–1997

Thelma Carpenter (January 15, 1922 – May 14, 1997) was an American jazz singer and actress, best known as "Miss One", the Good Witch of the North in the movie The Wiz.

== Early years ==
Carpenter was born in Brooklyn, New York, the only child of Fred and Mary Carpenter, and attended Girls' Commercial High School, where Susan Hayward was a few years ahead.

== Career ==
As a child performer, Carpenter had her own radio show on WNYC in New York and won an amateur night at the Apollo Theatre in 1938, where she would be honored and perform nearly 60 years later on the 1993 all-star NBC-TV special Apollo Theater Hall of Fame, hosted by Bill Cosby. She played at clubs such as Kelly's Stables and the Famous Door on legendary 52nd Street, where she was discovered by John Hammond.

She subsequently made her debut as a band vocalist with Teddy Wilson's short-lived orchestra in 1939, recording "Love Grows on the White Oak Tree" and "This Is the Moment" for Brunswick Records. She joined Coleman Hawkins' orchestra in 1940, with whom she made the RCA Bluebird Records classic "He's Funny That Way". She followed Helen Humes as Count Basie's vocalist in 1943, remaining with the band for two years, recording the Columbia Records hit "I Didn't Know About You" as well as many popular V-disc sides including "Do Nothing till You Hear from Me", "More Than You Know", "I Dream of You", "Tess's Torch Song" and "My Ideal".

She also made a V-disc version of Frank Loesser's "The Last Thing I Want Is Your Pity". She replaced Dinah Shore as vocalist on Eddie Cantor's radio show for the 1945–46 season, marking the first time that a black artist had become a permanent member of an all-white show without playing a character. She was a top nightclub attraction for most of her career, performing regularly at such chic clubs as Le Ruban Bleu, Spivy's Roof, the Bon Soir, the St. Regis Maisonette, and Michael's Pub, as well as Chez Bricktop in Paris and Rome. She headlined major theaters including the Capitol Theatre, Loew's State Theatre (New York City), the Strand, and the Palace Theatre on Broadway and sang with Duke Ellington in concerts and on television. As a solo artist, she recorded for Majestic Records, Musicraft Records, Columbia Records, RCA Victor Records, and Coral Records, for whom she had a surprising chart hit in 1961, answering Elvis Presley with Yes, I'm Lonesome Tonight.

Broadway appearances include Memphis Bound with Bill Robinson, Inside U.S.A. with Beatrice Lillie, the 1952 revival of Shuffle Along with Avon Long, Ankles Aweigh with Betty and Jane Kean and the title role in Hello, Dolly! in which she replaced Pearl Bailey more than 100 times and became the fully billed matinee star, with her name in all of the ads. It was in Dolly that she was seen by a producer from Paramount who signed her to co-star as the mother in the TV version of Neil Simon's Barefoot in the Park. She created the role of Irene Paige in Bubbling Brown Sugar, starring in the Philadelphia and Washington engagements, but left prior to the Broadway opening, and was featured in the original workshop production of Taking My Turn.

Carpenter toured nationally as the showstopping "Berthe" in Bob Fosse's production of Pippin, the same year she filmed her major production number "He's The Wizard" for Sidney Lumet's film version of The Wiz. Fosse and Lumet arranged their schedules so that she could do both projects. She recorded for Majestic, RCA Victor, Columbia and Coral and her answer-record to Elvis Presley, "Yes, I'm Lonesome Tonight", reached the Billboard Top 60 in 1961. She also had a critically acclaimed album, "Thinking of You Tonight".

Carpenter's television appearances began as early as the 1940s (including Cavalcade of Stars with Jackie Gleason, Ed Sullivan's Toast of the Town, "Floor Show" with Eddie Condon and "Kreisler Bandstand" with Duke Ellington), and she was prominently featured on the 1993 NBC special Apollo Theater Hall of Fame with Diana Ross, Eric Clapton and Bill Cosby.

A 26-track compilation of her major recordings entitled "Seems Like Old Times" was issued by Sepia Records in 2006. An album compilation with Ellis Larkins and Alec Wilder entitled Souvenir, is available on Audiophile Records. A compilation of her Eddie Cantor radio appearances from 1945-46, plus live performances with Duke Ellington, Count Basie, Teddy Wilson, Eddie Condon, and Garland Wilson was released in May, 2024 by Jasmine Records.

== Acting career ==
In the 1970s, Carpenter began an acting career and starred in the sitcom version of Barefoot in the Park, as well as several television movies, (The Devil's Daughter), comedy shows, and such feature films as The Wiz and The Cotton Club.

== Death ==
Carpenter suffered cardiac arrest and died in her apartment in New York on May 14, 1997.

== Filmography ==
- Crazy House (1943) – Thelma (uncredited) (unbilled appearance with Count Basie)
- Call Her Mom (1972) – Ida
- The Devil's Daughter (1973) – Margaret Poole
- The Wiz (1978) – Addapearle "Miss One" the Good Witch of the North
- The Cotton Club (1984) – Norma Williams
- New York Stories (1989) – Maid (segment "Life without Zoe") (scenes cut prior to release)

== Notable television appearances ==
- Kreisler Bandstand (with Duke Ellington and Avon Long)
- Eddie Condon Floor Show
- Ed Sullivan Show
- Merv Griffin Show
- Salute to Eddie Condon (with Johnny Mercer, Bob Crosby and Sammy Davis Jr.)
- Cavalcade of Stars (1949–1952) – 3 episodes (with Jackie Gleason, Jack Carter and Victor Borge)
- Barefoot in the Park (1970) – 12 episodes – "Mabel Bates"
- The Paul Lynde Show (1972) – "An Affair to Forget" – Herself
- The Love Boat (1981) – "Lady from Sunshine Gardens", "Eye of the Beholder", "Bugged" – Dora
- Apollo Theater Hall of Fame (1993) – Herself
- Cosby (1996) – "No Nudes Is Good Nudes" – (final television appearance)
