= Rock-A-Bye Baby (film) =

1958 film by Frank Tashlin

- Theatrical release poster
- Directed by: Frank Tashlin
- Written by: Frank Tashlin
- Based on: The Miracle of Morgan's Creek; 1944 film screenplay by Preston Sturges
- Produced by: Jerry Lewis
- Starring: Jerry Lewis; Marilyn Maxwell; Connie Stevens
- Cinematography: Haskell B. Boggs
- Edited by: Alma Macrorie
- Music by: Walter Scharf (Score); Harry Warren (Songs - music); Sammy Cahn (Songs - lyrics)
- Distributed by: Paramount Pictures
- Release dates: July 16, 1958 (Los Angeles); July 23, 1958 (New York City)
- Running time: 103 minutes
- Country: United States
- Language: English
- Budget: $1.2 million
- Box office: $3.1 million (US and Canada rentals); 1,608,274 admissions (France)

Rock-A-Bye Baby is a 1958 American musical comedy film starring Jerry Lewis. A loose remake of Preston Sturges' film The Miracle of Morgan's Creek (1944), the film was directed and written by Frank Tashlin, and features Marilyn Maxwell, Connie Stevens and Reginald Gardiner.

== Plot ==
Clayton Poole is a small-town TV repairman whose former sweetheart, Carla Naples, is now a famous movie star. Carla has cultivated a reputation as a virgin who does not have affairs or carouse with men in typical Hollywood fashion. On a romantic fling, she secretly marries Carlos, a famous Mexican bullfighter; the next morning the couple agree it was unwise and plan to have it annulled, but her husband dies that day in a bull-fight. Distraught, Carla tears up her marriage license, not realizing she is pregnant; there's no legal documentation to legitimize the child. Her agent, Harold Herman tries to avoid a scandal by sending Carla into the country to give birth. He suggests that they send the baby back to the town where she grew up, Midvale, Indiana. The cover story will be that she is going into seclusion to prepare for her next role, the lead in a controversial religious epic The White Virgin of the Nile. After, she can adopt her baby. Saying that her sister is too young and her father hasn't forgiven her for becoming a movie star, Carla decides on Clayton to take care of her baby.

After she gives birth, Carla asks if Clayton will help her. Still professing his undying devotion, Clayton agrees to care for the child. He is very surprised to discover that it is triplets, not one baby. Carla's sister, Sandy, offers to help Clayton, as she is in love with him and will do anything to get his attention.

Clayton works very hard to take care of the triplets, taking on extra work and attending a course on motherhood at a local college, but Midvale's child services want to place them with a well-to-do two-parent family. He earns the respect of Carla's father in his efforts to care for the triplets; both he and Carla's sister, Sandy, support Clayton keeping the babies.

On the final court day, the Naples family jump in to rescue Clayton and the triplets. Sandy enters the court in a wedding gown, pursued by her father, who is carrying a shotgun and claims that the babies are Sandy's. The Judge marries them, the implication being that they can keep the triplets. Meanwhile, Carla has seen the Midvale news and is afraid that her triplets will be taken from Clayton. She releases a press statement that the triplets are hers and that she and Clayton are secretly married. Now suspected of bigamy, Clayton goes into hiding with the triplets.

Eventually, the truth comes out: in the wake of the bigamy scandal, Mexican authorities reveal Carla's secret marriage to Carlos, so Clayton isn't a bigamist, nor is he the father of the triplets, nor are the triplets illegitimate. Harold (Carla's agent), who is in love with Carla, proposes. She accepts. Clayton then realizes that he's actually in love with Sandy, who has always loved him, not Carla. While taking a romantic walk and wondering when they can marry, they realize that they are married. Nine months later, Sandy gives birth to quintuplets. A statue of Clayton and his five babies is erected in front of the town courthouse, as Midvale's Hero.

== Cast ==
- Jerry Lewis as Clayton Poole
- Marilyn Maxwell as Carla Naples
- Connie Stevens as Sandra Naples
- Salvatore Baccaloni as Gigi "Papa" Naples
- Reginald Gardiner as Harold Hermann
- Hans Conried as Mr. Wright
- Isobel Elsom as Mrs. Van Cleeve
- James Gleason as Doc Simpkins
- Ida Moore as Miss Bessie Polk
- Hope Emerson as Mrs. Rogers, instructor at child care clinic
- Alex Gerry as Judge Jenkins
- Mary Treen as Nurse
- Judy Franklin as Young Carla Naples
- Gary Lewis as Young Clayton

Cast notes:

- Two of the original Keystone Cops, Hank Mann and Chester Conklin, have bit parts.
- Jerry Lewis' son Gary Lewis plays "Clayton Poole" as a boy in a fantasy sequence.
- A picture of comedian Jack Benny was used as a photograph of "Carlos", the Mexican bullfighter that Carla married, and the father of her triplets.
- George Sanders is listed in some cast lists for the film, but his part was cut before the movie was released, as was a small part played by Jerry Lewis' father, Danny.

== Production ==
Rock-A-Bye Baby was loosely based on the Preston Sturges' film The Miracle of Morgan's Creek (1944), which starred Eddie Bracken and Betty Hutton.

Rock-a-Bye Baby was filmed from November 18, 1957, through January 8, 1958, and opened in Los Angeles on July 16, 1958, followed by a premiere in New York City on July 23. It entered general release shortly afterwards. The film was re-released in 1962 on a double bill with another Jerry Lewis film, Don't Give Up The Ship.

== Songs and music ==
The songs in Rock-A-Bye Baby were written by Harry Warren (music) and Sammy Cahn (lyrics):

- "Rock-a-Bye Baby" – sung by Jerry Lewis
- "The Land of La-La-La" – sung by Jerry Lewis and Gary Lewis
- "Love Is a Lonely Thing" – sung by Jerry Lewis
- "Dormi, Dormi, Dormi (Sleep-Sleep-Sleep)" – sung by Salvatore Baccaloni and Jerry Lewis
- "Why Can't He Care for Me?" – sung by Connie Stevens
- "The White Virgin of the Nile" – sung by Marilyn Maxwell
- "Rock My Baby, Rock" – sung by Jerry Lewis

Songs and music notes:

- Another song by Warren and Cahn, "Me and My Baby", was written for the film but not used.
- The musical numbers in the film were staged by Nicholas Castle Sr.
- Because of a musician's strike, Walter Scharf's score had to be recorded in Mexico City in March 1958, causing union musicians to picket a preview of the film in Los Angeles on June 3, 1958. Some reports maintain that Lewis himself conducted the 100-piece orchestra.
- "Rock My Baby, Rock" is a spoof of rock and roll music, with Lewis fronting a group dressed and equipped in similar fashion to Bill Haley & His Comets, and incorporating a drum solo performed by Lewis.

== Reception ==
On Rotten Tomatoes, the film holds a 63% rating based on 8 reviews, with an average rating of 5.70/10.

== Home media ==
The film was released on DVD and Blu-ray on February 14, 2012, through the Olive Films company.
