= Love's Savage Fury =

- Genre: Drama; Western
- Written by: Calvin Clements Jr
- Directed by: Joseph Hardy
- Starring: Jennifer O'Neill; Perry King; Raymond Burr
- Music by: John Addison
- Country of origin: United States
- Original language: English

Production
- Executive producers: Douglas S. Cramer; Aaron Spelling
- Producer: Ronald Lyon
- Cinematography: Richard L. Rawlings
- Editors: Wayne Wahrman; John Woodcock
- Running time: 100 min.
- Production company: Aaron Spelling Productions

Original release
- Network: ABC
- Release: May 20, 1979

Love's Savage Fury is a 1979 American TV film.

== Plot ==
In the American Civil War, a Southern belle survives a Union prison.

== Cast ==
- Jennifer O'Neill
- Raymond Burr
- Perry King
- Robert Reed
- Connie Stevens
- Ed Lauter

== Production ==
Jaclyn Smith was meant to star but she pulled out after reading the script. Filming started March 22, 1979.

== Reception ==
It was the third highest rated show of the week.
