= Connie Stevens =

American actress and singer (born 1938)

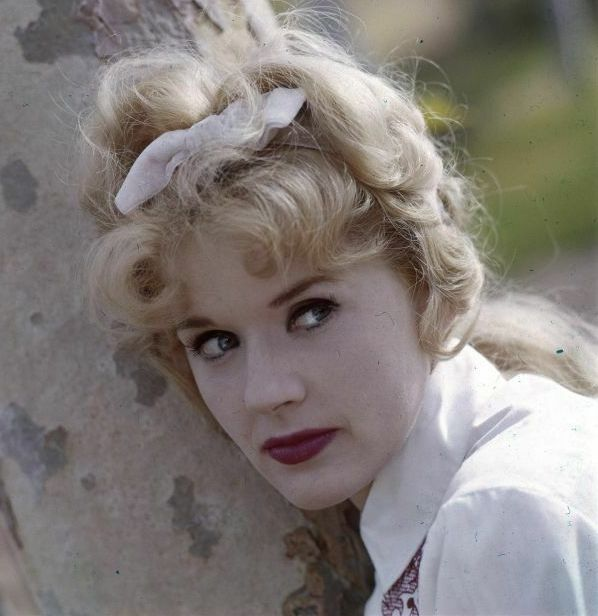
- Stevens in the early 1960s
- Born: Concetta Rosalie Ann Ingolia; August 8, 1938 (age 88); New York City, U.S.
- Occupations: Actress; director; screenwriter; producer; cinematographer; editor; singer
- Years active: 1957–2019
- Spouses: James Stacy (m. 1963; div. 1966); Eddie Fisher (m. 1967; div. 1969)
- Children: Joely Fisher; Tricia Leigh Fisher
- Relatives: John Megna (half-brother)

Connie Stevens (born Concetta Rosalie Ann Ingolia; August 8, 1938) is an American actress and traditional pop singer. Born in Brooklyn to musician parents, Stevens was raised there until the age of 12, when she was sent to live with family friends in rural Missouri. In 1953, when she was 15 years old, Stevens relocated with her father to Los Angeles.

She began her career in 1957, making her feature film debut in Young and Dangerous, before releasing her debut album, Concetta, the following year. She had a supporting role in the musical comedy Rock-A-Bye Baby (1958) opposite Jerry Lewis, followed by the drama film The Party Crashers (also 1958) opposite Frances Farmer.

Stevens gained widespread recognition for her portrayal of "Cricket" Blake on the ABC TV Warner Brothers series Hawaiian Eye, beginning in 1959 opposite Robert Conrad and Anthony Eisley. She garnered concurrent musical success when her single "Sixteen Reasons" became a national radio hit, peaking at #3 on the Billboard Hot 100 chart and at #9 on the UK Singles Chart in 1960. Stevens continued to appear in film and television throughout the 1970s and 1980s, as well as performing as a musical nightclub act.

Stevens' later film roles include in the comedies Tapeheads (1988) and Love Is All There Is (1996). In 2009, Stevens made her directorial debut with the feature film Saving Grace B. Jones, which she also wrote and produced, based partly on elements of her own childhood.

== Early life ==
Stevens was born Concetta Rosalie Ann Ingolia in Brooklyn, New York City, on August 8, 1938, the daughter of musician Peter Ingolia (known as Teddy Stevens) and singer Eleanor McGinley. Stevens is of Jewish, Italian and Irish descent. She adopted her father's stage name of Stevens as her own. Her parents divorced and she lived with her grandparents and attended Catholic boarding schools. Actor John Megna was her maternal half-brother.

At the age of 12, she witnessed a murder while waiting at a bus stop in Brooklyn in 1950–51. The event traumatized Stevens, and she was sent to live with family friends in Boonville, Missouri.

Coming from a musical family, Stevens joined the singing group called The Fourmost with Tony Butala, who went on to fame as founder of The Lettermen. Stevens moved to Los Angeles with her father in 1953.

== Career ==
=== Early films ===
Her first notable film role was in Young and Dangerous (1957) with Mark Damon, a low-budget teen movie. She also was in Eighteen and Anxious (1957); and an episode of The Bob Cummings Show ("Bob Goes Hillbilly"). In December 1957 Stevens signed a seven-year contract with Paramount starting at $600 a week going up to $1,500 a week.

Jerry Lewis saw her in Dragstrip Riot (1958), and cast her as his love interest in his 1958 production of Rock-A-Bye Baby, giving Stevens her first big break.

Stevens made another film with Damon, The Party Crashers (1958), before Paramount dropped her.

=== Warner Bros. and Hawaiian Eye ===
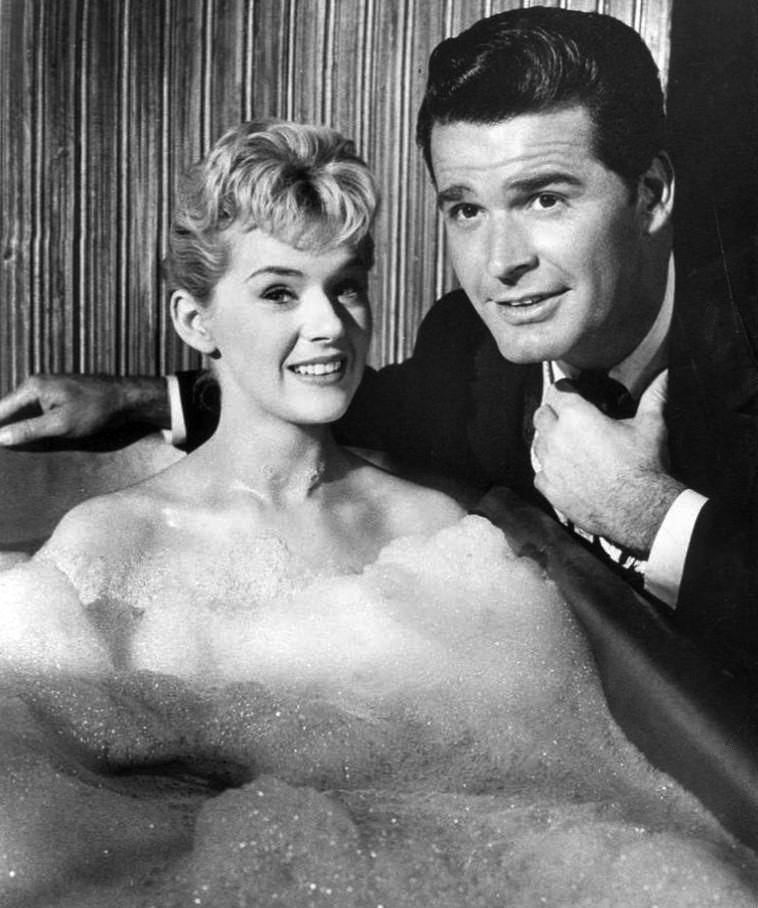
Stevens and James Garner from a 1959 episode of Maverick

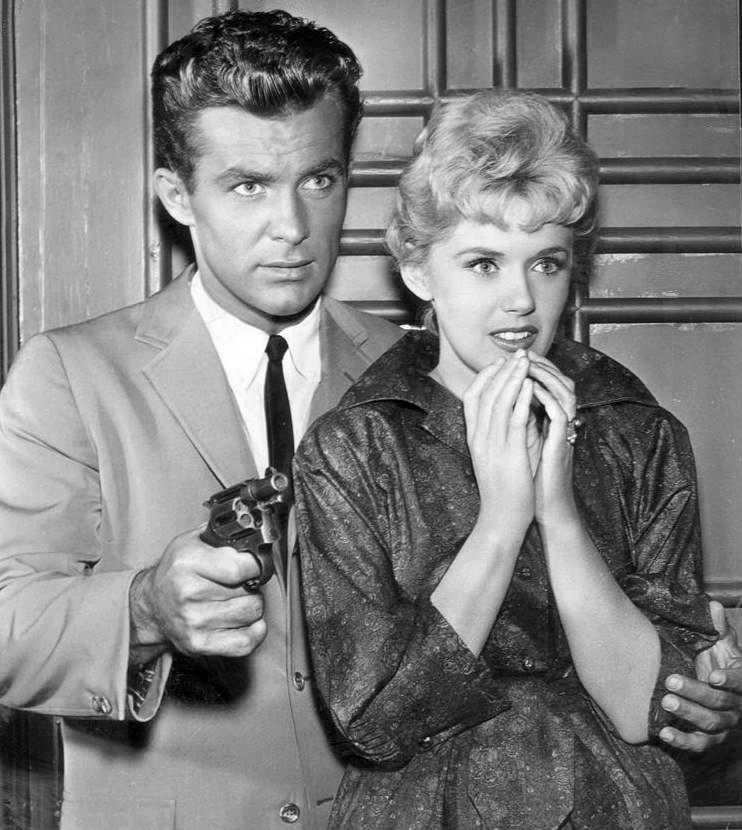
Robert Conrad and Stevens, 1960

In May 1959, she signed a seven-year contract with Warner Bros. starting at $300 per week. Like many Warners contract players, Stevens was kept busy guest-starring on their regular TV shows such as The Ann Sothern Show, Maverick, Tenderfoot, 77 Sunset Strip and Cheyenne.

She appeared opposite James Garner in an episode of the TV Western series Maverick titled "Two Tickets to Ten Strike," which also featured Adam West. Stardom came when she was cast as Cricket Blake in the popular television detective series Hawaiian Eye from 1959 to 1963, a role that made her famous; her principal costar was Robert Conrad.

First televised on December 23, 1960, she appeared (uncredited) in "The Dresden Doll", Episode 15 of Season 3 of 77 Sunset Strip as her character from Hawaiian Eye, Cricket Blake.

In a televised interview on August 26, 2003, on CNN's Larry King Live, Stevens recounted that while on the set of Hawaiian Eye she was told she had a telephone call from Elvis Presley. "She didn't believe it, but in fact it was Elvis, who invited her to a party and said that he would come to her house and pick her up personally"; they subsequently dated.

=== Music career ===
Stevens' first album was titled Concetta (1958). She had minor single hits with the standards "Blame It on My Youth" (music by Oscar Levant and lyrics by Edward Heyman), "Looking for a Boy" (music by George Gershwin and lyrics by Ira Gershwin), and "Spring Is Here" (music by Richard Rodgers and lyrics by Lorenz Hart).

After making several appearances on the Warner Bros. hit TV series 77 Sunset Strip, she recorded the hit novelty song "Kookie, Kookie (Lend Me Your Comb)" (1959), a duet with one of the stars of the program, Edd Byrnes, that reached #4 on the Billboard Hot 100. She and Byrnes also appeared together on ABC's The Pat Boone Chevy Showroom.

She had hit singles as a solo artist with "Sixteen Reasons" (1960), her biggest hit, reaching #3 on the Billboard Hot 100, (#9 in the UK) and a minor #71 hit "Too Young to Go Steady" (1960) (music by Jimmy McHugh and lyrics by Harold Adamson). Other single releases were "Apollo","Why'd You Wanna Make Me Cry?", "Something Beautiful," "Mr. Songwriter," "Now That You've Gone," "La-La (Means I Love You)" (originally performed by The Delfonics), and "Keep Growing Strong" (which was remade by the Stylistics under the title "Betcha by Golly, Wow").

=== Film stardom and theatre ===
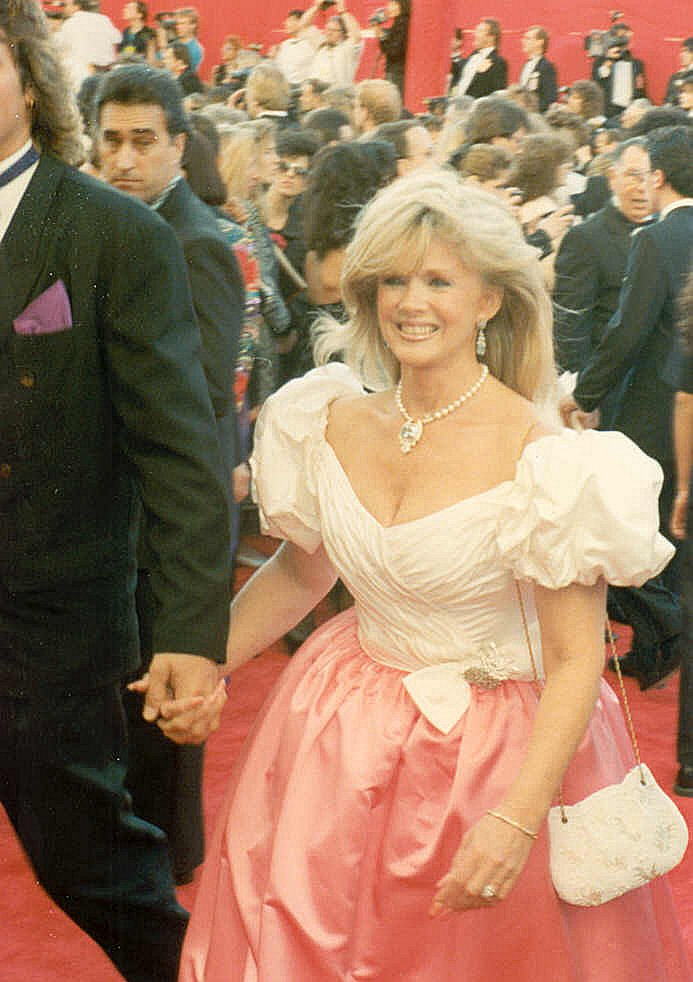
Stevens at the 1989 Academy Awards

Stevens' popularity on the small screen and as a recording star encouraged Warner Bros. to try her in films. She starred in three films for the studio, all opposite Troy Donahue: Parrish (1961), as a rural girl; Susan Slade (1962), playing the title role, an unwed mother; and Palm Springs Weekend (1963), a teen romantic comedy. In 1962 Warner Bros. suspended her briefly for refusing to go on a publicity tour. She performed in Wizard of Oz on stage in Kansas.

When Hawaiian Eye ended, Stevens guest-starred on Temple Houston and The Red Skelton Show. She played the lead in the horror film Two on a Guillotine (1965), for Warners.

Stevens later starred as Wendy Conway in the television sitcom Wendy and Me (1964–1965) with George Burns, who also produced the show with Warner Bros. and played an older man who watched Wendy's exploits upstairs on what appears to be a surreptitious closed-circuit television hook-up in his apartment. She had a percentage of the show, and had three and a half years left on her contract with Warners. She said "I've done the teenage epics... and want to move up into something like Virginia Woolf or Any Wednesday. I want to be a big star but do I have to throw tantrums and behave badly to get there? Can't I just be talented and work hard and be happily married?"

Stevens had the juvenile lead in Never Too Late (1965), released by Warner Bros. She signed a new contract with Warner Bros. to make one film a year for six years.

She reprised her stage performance of Wizard of Oz at Carousel Theatre, California, then followed it with Any Wednesday, at Melodyland, Anaheim California. Stevens was reunited with Jerry Lewis in Way... Way Out (1966).

=== Broadway and nightclubs ===
Stevens in 1966 starred in the Broadway production of Neil Simon's The Star-Spangled Girl with Anthony Perkins and Richard Benjamin. While she continued to appear in television series such as ABC Stage 67, Rowan & Martin's Laugh-In, and Love, American Style, Stevens enjoyed performing live, so in 1968 she also began appearing regularly in nightclubs in Las Vegas, where her shows were well received by both audiences and entertainment critics.

=== TV movies ===
Stevens had a small role in a TV movie The Littlest Angel (1969). She made Mister Jerico (1970) for British TV and had a supporting role in The Grissom Gang (1971).

Stevens starred in the TV movies Call Her Mom (1972), Playmates (1972), Every Man Needs One (1972), and The Sex Symbol (1974).

She turned down the Valerie Perrine role in Lenny because of its nudity.

She had the lead in a feature Scorchy (1976).

In the 1970s, Stevens started singing the "Ace Is the Place" jingle on Ace Hardware TV commercials in Southern California, and was a guest on The Dean Martin Celebrity Roast a few times.

In the spring of 1977, Stevens appeared in a first-season episode of The Muppet Show.

=== 1980s ===
She was in Love's Savage Fury (1979), Murder Can Hurt You! (1980), Scruples (1980), Aloha Paradise, Side Show (1981), Harry's Battles (1981), and Grease 2 (1982).

Stevens guest starred on Fantasy Island, The Love Boat, Hotel, Detective in the House, Murder, She Wrote and Tales from the Darkside.

She had supporting roles in Rowdies (1986), Back to the Beach (1987), Tapeheads (1988), and Bring Me the Head of Dobie Gillis (1988).

She also was seen numerous times on the Bob Hope USO specials, including his Christmas Show from the Persian Gulf (1988).

In 1988, Stevens said "I still want to make movies with Marlon Brando. But first I've got to get hot. That's what I'm trying to do - get hot. I'm still waiting for the big role. I haven't peaked yet."

She elaborated:

I'm a big star all over the world except in Hollywood. I play (nightclubs in) Japan and Hong Kong every Christmas and New Year's... I don't have a hit TV show, I don't have a hit record, I don't have a hit movie, but I created something that people still love. I invented Cricket. There was barely a part written for me. Half the time, I said whatever I wanted. I was everybody's daughter. I was every boy's fantasy girlfriend. Girls wanted to be like me. That good feeling still exists. That's why I'm a big business, with 17 people working for me. I may not be the richest woman in the world, but I do okay. But Hollywood is a different story... There's something wrong when an actress can come off a 'Dynasty' or a 'Falcon Crest' and get a production deal (to star in a mini-series or TV movie) and I can't.

Stevens had a regular role on the sitcom Starting from Scratch (1988). She said at the time, "TV is not my favorite medium; the work is hard, you don't have any life, and I feel like I've already been a champion in it, but the economics of the business is you need momentum to get hot. I'm using this to get me into movies." The show only lasted one season.

=== 1990s onwards ===
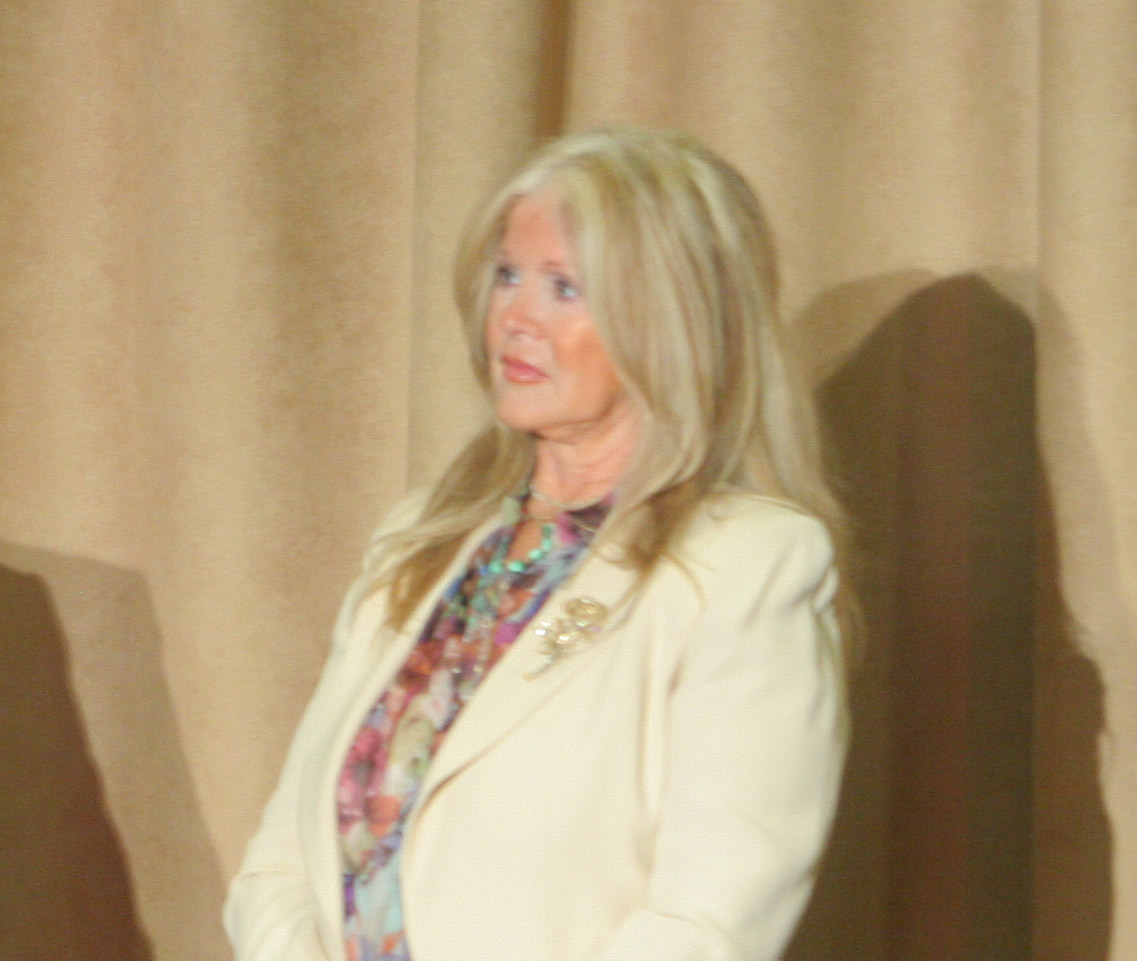
Stevens in 2007

Stevens’ later appearances include Ellen, Love Is All There Is, Baywatch, Clueless, James Dean: Race with Destiny (1997), Returning Mickey Stern, Titus, Wild Card, 8 Simple Rules, Fat Actress, The Wedding Album, and "Murder, she Wrote".

In 1997, Stevens wrote, edited, and directed a documentary entitled A Healing, about Red Cross nurses who served during the Vietnam War. The following year it won the title of Best Film at the Santa Clarita International Film Festival. She also co-wrote and directed the thriller Saving Grace B. Jones (2009); it was shot in Boonville and is based on true events that Stevens witnessed there, as a child.

She also was in Double Duty (2009), Just Before I Go (2014), and Search Engines (2016), co-starring daughter Joely Fisher.

== Other projects ==
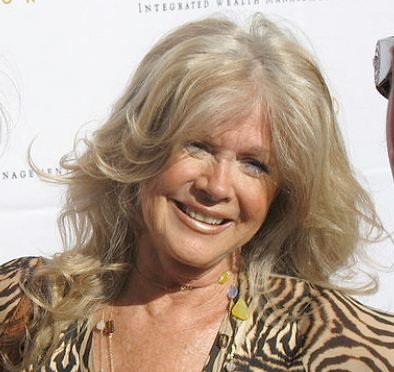
Stevens at the SAG Foundation Awards, 2007

In 1969, Stevens toured with the Bob Hope USO tour to Guam and Southeast Asia.

In 1987, she, Barbara Eden and Lee Greenwood toured with Bob Hope on his USO tour to the Persian Gulf. Among her charitable works, she founded the Windfeather project to award scholarships to Native Americans, and supports CancerGroup.com. In 1991 Stevens received the Lady of Humanities Award from Shriners Hospital and the Humanitarian of the Year Award by the Sons of Italy in Washington, D.C.

Stevens developed her own cosmetic skin care product line, Forever Spring, and in the 1990s opened the Connie Stevens Garden Sanctuary Day Spa in Los Angeles.

In 1994, accompanied by her two daughters, she issued her first recording in several years, Tradition: A Family at Christmas,

She made nightclub appearances and headlined in major Las Vegas showrooms.

== Awards and recognition ==
Stevens has a star on the Palm Springs Walk of Stars in Palm Springs, California, a star on the Hollywood Walk of Fame at 6249 Hollywood Boulevard in Hollywood, California, and a star on the Italian Walk of Fame in Toronto, Ontario.

On September 23, 2005, Stevens was elected secretary-treasurer of the Screen Actors Guild, the union's second-highest elected position. She succeeded James Cromwell, who did not seek re-election.

On June 29, 2013, the National Society of Daughters of the American Revolution's President General, Merry Ann Wright, presented Stevens with the Founder's Medal for Patriotism for her 40+ years of work with the USO.

In Quentin Tarantino's 2019 film Once Upon a Time in Hollywood, Connie Stevens is portrayed by actress Dreama Walker.

== Personal life ==
Stevens dated actor Glenn Ford in the early 1960s.

She was married twice during her twenties. Her first husband, from 1963 until their 1966 divorce, was actor James Stacy. Her second husband, from 1967 until they divorced in 1969, was singer Eddie Fisher. She is the mother of actresses Joely Fisher and Tricia Leigh Fisher, and the former stepmother of Todd Fisher and actress Carrie Fisher. Stevens is a half-sister of John Megna through their mother.

== Filmography ==
=== Films ===
Year	Title	Role	Notes	Ref.
1957	Young and Dangerous	Candy		
1957	Eighteen and Anxious			
1958	Dragstrip Riot	Marge		
1958	Rock-A-Bye Baby	Sandra Naples		
1958	The Party Crashers	Barbara Nickerson		
1961	Parrish	Lucy		
1962	Susan Slade	Susan Slade		
1963	Palm Springs Weekend	Gayle Lewis / Jane Hoover		
1965	Two on a Guillotine	Melinda Duquesne / Cassie Duquesne		
1965	Never Too Late	Kate Clinton		
1966	Way...Way Out	Eileen Forbes		
1971	The Last Generation			
1971	The Grissom Gang	Anna Borg		
1976	Scorchy	Jackie Parker		
1978	Sgt. Pepper's Lonely Hearts Club Band	Herself	Cameo	
1982	Grease 2	Miss Mason		
1987	Back to the Beach	Connie		
1988	Tapeheads	June Tager		
1996	Love Is All There Is	Miss Deluca		
1997	James Dean: Race with Destiny	Jane Deacy		
2002	Returning Mickey Stern	Eloise Vanderwild		
2009	Saving Grace B. Jones	Narrator (voice)	Also director, writer, and producer	
2009	Double Duty	Irma		
2014	Just Before I Go	Nancy		
2016	Search Engines	Geena		
2019	By the Rivers of Babylon	Meredith		

=== Television ===
- The Bob Cummings Show (1958)
- The Ann Sothern Show (1958)
- 77 Sunset Strip (1958–1960)
- Cheyenne (1959)
- Hawaiian Eye (1959–1963)
- Maverick (1959) - Episode: "Two Tickets to Ten Strike" with James Garner
- Wendy and Me (1964–1965) - Series with George Burns
- The Littlest Angel (1969)
- Love American Style – Episode: "Love and the Legal Agreement" (1969)
- Mister Jerico (1970)
- Kraft Music Hall Presents The Des O'Connor Show (1970-71)
- Call Her Mom (1972)
- Playmates (1972)
- Every Man Needs One (1972)
- The Sex Symbol (1974)
- The Muppet Show (Episode 102) (1976)
- Love's Savage Fury (1979)
- Scruples (1980) (miniseries)
- Murder Can Hurt You (1980)
- Side Show (1981)
- Fantasy Island – Season 5 Episode 5: "Show Me A Hero" (1982)
- The Love Boat – Episode: "Same Wavelength" (1982)
- Fantasy Island – Season 6 Episode 19: "The Beautiful Skeptic" (1982)
- Murder, She Wrote – Episode: "Murder Digs Deep" (1985)
- Tales from the Darkside – Episode: "Unhappy Medium" (1986)
- Starting from Scratch (1988–1989)
- Bring Me the Head of Dobie Gillis (1988)
- Murder, She Wrote – Episode: "The Big Show of 1965" (1990)
- Baywatch – Episode: - "Guess Who's Coming to Dinner" (1996)
- James Dean: Race with Destiny (1997)
- Becoming Dick (2000)
- 8 Simple Rules – Episode: "Daddy's Girl" (2004)
- Fat Actress – Episode: "Crack for Good" (2005)
