= Saving Grace B. Jones =

- Directed by: Connie Stevens
- Written by: Connie Stevens
- Produced by: Connie Stevens
- Starring: Penelope Ann Miller; Michael Biehn; Tatum O'Neal; Piper Laurie; Joel Gretsch
- Release date: March 28, 2009

Saving Grace B. Jones is an independent feature written, produced, and directed by Connie Stevens. The film made its world premiere in the Philadelphia Film Festival/Cinefest on March 28, 2009, and screened in the 18th annual St. Louis International Film Festival on November 20, 2009. The film was released generally in the United States in December 2012. Filming took place in the town of Boonville, Missouri, in 2007.

== Plot ==
Bea and Landy Bretthorse, a couple in a small Missouri town, are going to experience chaos when Landy's sister Grace is released from a local asylum and comes to live with the family in the summer leading up to the Great Flood of 1951.

== Cast ==
- Penelope Ann Miller as Bea Bretthorse
- Michael Biehn as Landy Bretthorse
- Tatum O'Neal as Grace B. Jones
- Evie Louise Thompson as Lucy Bretthorse
- Piper Laurie as Marta
- Joel Gretsch as Dan Jones
- Scott Wilson as Reverend Potter
- Tricia Leigh Fisher as Ella Jean Jones
- Rylee Fansler as Carrie
- Logan Alexander Moore as Sean Ryan
- Charles Taylor as Davey Lund
- Vincent Onofrio Monachino as Lemuel "Lem" Bryerton
- Karen Errington as Lynette Bryerton
