= Every Man Needs One =

1972 television film

- Genre: Romantic comedy
- Written by: Carl Kleinschmitt
- Directed by: Jerry Paris
- Starring: Connie Stevens; Ken Berry; Gail Fisher
- Theme music composer: Jack Elliott; Allyn Ferguson
- Country of origin: United States
- Original language: English

Production
- Executive producers: Leonard Goldberg; Aaron Spelling
- Producer: Jerry Paris
- Cinematography: William T. Cline
- Editor: Bob Wyman
- Running time: 74 minutes
- Production company: ABC Circle Films

Original release
- Network: ABC
- Release: December 13, 1972

Every Man Needs One is a 1972 made-for-television romantic comedy film. It was first shown December 13, 1972, on ABC as an ABC Movie of the Week.

Some of the film was filmed on location in Malibu, California.

The film was produced and directed by Jerry Paris, who also had a cameo as David's drinking buddy.

== Plot ==
RV park architect David Chase is looking to hire another architect to assist him. Also working for him is sexy secretary Nancy, who he's sleeping with, and draftsman Walt, who can't pass the architect licensing exam because he's extremely insecure. David's mother is badgering him to get married, mentioning Louise, his fiancée from 12 years earlier. The first interview is with highly qualified candidate E.L. Walden, and David is surprised when it turns out to be attractive blonde Elizabeth Lee "Beth" Walden. He brushes her off and she files a complaint with a fair employment commission. When told that the penalty for a judgment against him would be a court order that he hire her for 30 days, he laughingly agrees to hire her for that term.

Beth shows up early the next morning in her truck camper and begins to move her drawing board and supplies into the office. David is outraged by her self-confidence and her outdoorsy attire. Beth gives advice to Nancy that causes her to cut off David's advances, as well as advice to Walt that settles his nervousness. When Beth criticizes David's latest design, he's even more outraged.

David goes drinking with his friend Marty, who advises him that Beth just needs David to "make a real woman out of her." He drunkenly goes to Beth's apartment, where she rebuffs him and he finally passes out. After an argument the next day where Beth says he's insecure, David angrily rides his motorcycle to the job site, but crashes on a back road. He wakes to see that Beth had tracked him down. Driving him back in her camper, she swerves to avoid a sudden obstacle and the truck gets stuck in a ditch. Beth suggests spending the night then walking back to town the next day to call for a tow truck. David doesn't want to wait and begins walking back himself. He returns 90 minutes later, having gotten lost and walking around until he saw the camper's light. They get drunk on a bottle of champagne in the camper and sleep together. David is upset when Beth dismisses the night as being without any emotional involvement, using the same speech that David always told Nancy. He feels objectified.

Realizing that he is falling for her, he suggests that they get better acquainted. Over the next weeks, they do fall in love. After they sleep together again, David's mother calls and says Louise is in town and wants to meet him. Beth insists that David and Louise should get together and even sleep together so they can resolve any feelings between them. When David objects, they argue and Beth says she's going to Mammoth Mountain with Bob Rasmussen, a "very tall and Nordic" ski instructor.

Louise arrives and she is a marijuana-smoking divorcée. She tells David that she married somebody else because he didn't pursue her strongly enough. David realizes his foolishness and speeds to Mammoth to get Beth. Checking various hotels, he finds the room Bob is in and finds a wimpy man. He manhandles Bob, who says Beth never went to the room and just went to Mammoth to make "some idiot" jealous, but when David didn't show up, she became depressed, so Bob put her on a bus back to Los Angeles. David gets back in his Porsche and pursues the bus. Beth is thrilled when he pulls alongside. The bus driver refuses to stop, citing all sorts of crazy threats like hijacking, but eventually relents. Beth gets off and they embrace. Beth laments that she left her luggage on the bus, but David suggests they drive two hours to Nevada and get married instead. Beth accepts.

== Cast ==
Actor	Role
Connie Stevens	E.L. (Beth) Walden
Ken Berry	David Chase
Henry Gibson	Walt
Carol Wayne	Nancy
Gail Fisher	Pauline Kramer
Louise Sorel	Louise Lathrop
Steve Franken	Bob Rasmussen
Nancy Walker	David's Mother (voice only)
Jerry Paris	Marty Ranier
Stanley Adams	Bus Driver
