= No Way Back (1976 film) =

American blaxploitation film by Fred Williamson

- Theatrical Release Poster
- Directed by: Fred Williamson
- Written by: Fred Williamson
- Starring: Fred Williamson; Charles Woolf; Tracy Reed; Virginia Gregg; Stack Pierce; Don Cornelius
- Cinematography: Robert Caramico
- Edited by: James E. Nownes
- Production company: Po' Boy Productions
- Distributed by: Atlas Films
- Release dates: April 23, 1976 (Gary, Indiana); July 1976 (United States)
- Running time: 89 minutes
- Country: United States
- Language: English
- Budget: $75,000

No Way Back is a 1976 blaxploitation film written and directed by Fred Williamson, who also stars as Jesse Crowder, a private detective who once used to belong to a police force, but that now finds himself taking odd jobs for a little extra money.

== Synopsis ==
Jesse Crowder is hired by the wife and brother of a fugitive named Pickens, who is on the run because he had just robbed a bank, and uses this money to embezzle it, where from Crowder decides to take the case and follows the fugitive from Los Angeles to San Francisco, California. Pickens is on the run with his girlfriend Candy. Crowder pursues his targets by following small clues, while causing a whole mess of trouble with a gangster named Bernie. Bernie is Candy's pimp and also the leader of a gang. When Bernie learns that Crowder is looking for one of his employees, he makes sure that Crowder is taken care of. He sends numerous thugs in Crowder's direction, but Crowder manages to successfully capture Mrs. Pickens’ husband after fighting off a couple of Bernie's thugs, but has yet to capture the girlfriend. Crowder's previous cop experience provided a helpful basis from which he was able to eventually pick up on her trail after having gotten himself into more trouble with Candy's pimp and his gang. A final showdown takes place in the desert in a hail of gunfire.

== Cast ==
- Fred Williamson as Jesse Crowder
- Charles Woolf as Mr. Pickens
- Tracy Reed as Candy
- Virginia Gregg as Mildred Pickens
- Stack Pierce as Bernie
- Argy Allen as Pickens' Brother
- Paula Sills as Crowder's Secretary
- Don Cornelius as Don Cornelius
- Nick Dimitri as Goon #1
- Gene LeBell as Goon #2
- Mike Henry as Goon #3
- William Kerwin as Goon #4

== Crew ==
- Fred Williamson - director, producer, screenwriter
- Jeff Williamson - producer
- James E. Nownes - editor
- Oliver Moss - sound/sound designer
- Robert Caramico - cinematographer

== Analysis ==
Jesse Crowder plays by his own rules and will do anything he can within his power to complete his mission; all that he needs to ensure that he does this is some cold, hard cash. Besides a thirst for money, Crowder also has a thirst for women. He is a ladies’ man as some would say, and is also a stereotypically strong African-American man, a strong black man, and makes sure that everyone around him knows this. This aspect of the movie may represent a sort of ironic situation in that Crowder boasts about his strength and physical prowess with the women, which are animal-like characteristics, yet also demands to be seen as more than just what the white man has made him out to be. Crowder often encounters many women with whom he has sexual relations shortly after meeting them. His slick lines and tough-guy attitude sweep the ladies right off their feet so that at the end of all of these sexual encounters, the women are often seen begging for more sex. This stereotype was a common blaxploitation characteristic to use in African-American films.

== Release ==
In Full Tilt Boogie, a documentary about a horror film that Williamson was in, From Dusk Till Dawn, he claimed he made the film on a budget of 75,000 dollars. He also claimed that when he sold the film at that year’s Cannes Film Festival, he had women selling copies of his picture.

Williamson chose to premiere the film in his hometown of Gary, Indiana on April 23, 1976 to help raise funds for the city’s planned National Civil Rights Hall Of Fame.

Atlas Films had planned to have a wide release for the film during the 4th of July weekend. The film was also released in Biloxi, Mississippi on August 21, 1976.

== Historical significance ==
This film is part of a larger genre known as blaxploitation, which emerged in the early 1970s in the time when many black exploitation films were being made specifically to target black audiences. No Way Back emerged as one of these in 1976 and was set on the West Coast, which typically as many other blaxploitation films like it took place in the ghetto. This was a common characteristic of blaxploitation films, which accentuated crime, drug deals, and pimps. Another important aspect of this particular movie is the pun with the name Jesse Crowder which plays on Jim Crow Laws, an important and controversial aspect of earlier African-American life. Only a little over a decade before the film was made, segregating black and whites in public institutions and other places in society had been legal.

== Soundtrack ==
The film includes three tracks from the album of the same name by The Dells: No Way Back, Too Late for Love, and Adventure.
