= Mister Jerico =

1970 film directed by Sidney Hayers

- Belgian theatrical poster
- Screenplay by: Philip Levene
- Directed by: Sidney Hayers
- Starring: Patrick Macnee; Connie Stevens; Herbert Lom; Marty Allen
- Music by: Laurie Johnson
- Country of origin: United Kingdom
- Original language: English

Production
- Producer: Julian Wintle
- Cinematography: Alan Hume
- Editor: Lionel Selwyn
- Running time: 83 minutes
- Production company: ITC

Original release
- Release: 1970

Mister Jerico is a 1970 British crime comedy film directed by Sidney Hayers and starring Patrick Macnee. Originally made for TV, it was released theatrically in the U.K. and some other territories. Smooth conman Dudley Jerico plots to relieve millionaire Mr. Rosso of his Gemini diamond.

== Cast ==
- Patrick Macnee as Dudley Jerico
- Connie Stevens as Susan / Claudine / Georgina
- Herbert Lom as Rosso
- Marty Allen as Wally
- Leonardo Pieroni as Angelo
- Peter Yapp as Felipe
- Bruce Boa as Nolan
- Joanne Dainton as Merle
- Paul Darrow as Receptionist
- Jasmina Hilton as Maid

== Production ==
It was filmed in London and Malta.

== Critical reception ==
The Radio Times found it a "disappointing comedy caper...despite the catchy title track from Lulu and the star's stunning array of flowery shirts"; whereas Cinedelica wrote "the final minutes are a bit cheesy, but it's still solid entertainment...Certainly one for ITC and Avengers fans - and indeed, anyone who likes a 60s crime caper."
