= Tracy Reed (American actress) =

American actress and former model

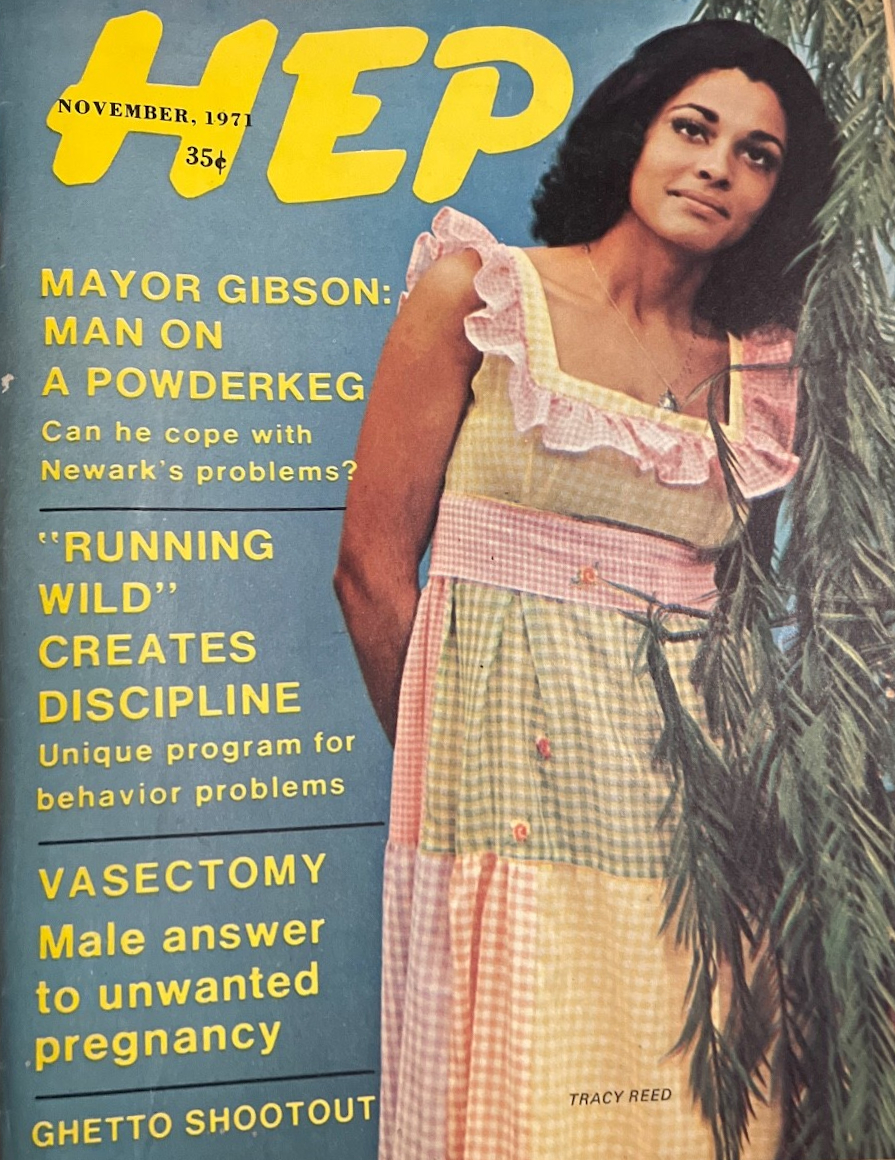
- Reed on a 1971 magazine cover
- Born: Fort Benning, Georgia, U.S.
- Other name: T.C. Reed
- Education: UCLA (BA)
- Occupation: Actress
- Years active: 1967–1991

Tracy Reed is an American actress and former model.

== Early years ==
Reed was born in Fort Benning, Georgia. She is the daughter of David Reed, a retired Army major, and Anne Reed, a teacher. She was a journalism student at the University of California, Los Angeles when a TV producer invited her to audition. That tryout resulted in a part on Love, American Style. She graduated from UCLA with a BA in English.

== Career ==
Reed co-starred in the 1970 TV series Barefoot in the Park and played Virginia Tyndall in the 1979 TV miniseries Women in White.

Her most memorable film roles include No Way Back (1976), Car Wash (1976), A Piece of the Action (1977), ...All the Marbles (1981) and Running Scared (1986).

In 1971, the California Press Photographers Association named Reed the Most Beautiful Face in Television.

== Filmography ==
Year	Title	Role	Notes
1972	Trouble Man	Policewoman	Uncredited
1973	The Great American Beauty Contest	Pamela Parker, Miss New Jersey	TV Movie
1974	The Take	Nancy	
1975	Kojak	Dorothy Cunningham	Season 2 Episode 25: "I Want to Report a Dream"
1975	Train Ride to Hollywood	Stupid Bimbo (also known as Saturday)	
1976	No Way Back	Candy	
1976	Car Wash	Mona	
1977	A Piece of the Action	Nikki McLean	
1977	Tabitha	Portia	Episode: "That New Black Magic"
1978	Top Secret	Carla Magee	
1981	Terror Among Us	Barbara	TV Movie
1981	...All the Marbles	Diane, Toledo Tiger	
1986	Running Scared	Maryann Thomas	
