= Barefoot in the Park =

Play written by Neil Simon

- 2006 Revival Poster
- Original language: English
- Written by: Neil Simon
- Characters: Corie Bratter; Paul Bratter; Mrs. Ethel Banks (Corie's mother); Victor Velasco; Telephone repair man
- Subject: Newlyweds learn to cope with life, and each other
- Genre: Comedy

Premiere
- Date: October 23, 1963
- Place: Biltmore Theatre; Broadway

Barefoot in the Park is a romantic comedy stage play by Neil Simon. The play premiered on Broadway in 1963, starring Robert Redford and Elizabeth Ashley. It was made into a film in 1967, which starred Redford and Jane Fonda.

== Productions ==
Barefoot in the Park had a pre-Broadway production under the title Nobody Loves Me at the Bucks County Playhouse in New Hope, PA.

The play opened on Broadway at the Biltmore Theatre on October 23, 1963, and closed on June 25, 1967, after 1,530 performances. It was Neil Simon's longest-running hit, and the tenth-longest running non-musical play in Broadway history. The cast included Elizabeth Ashley (Corie), Robert Redford (Paul), Mildred Natwick (Mrs. Banks), and Kurt Kasznar (Victor Velasco); the director was Mike Nichols. Scenic design was by Oliver Smith, costumes by Donald Brooks, and lighting by Jean Rosenthal. The play was nominated for four 1964 Tony Awards, with Nichols winning the award for Best Direction of a Play.

Myrna Loy starred as Mrs. Banks opposite Joan Van Ark as Corie and Richard Benjamin as Paul in the national tour during the time the play was still on Broadway. Virginia Mayo and Margaret O'Brien co-starred in a 1968 national tour of the play. Beginning in 1978, Dorothy Lamour spent three years playing Mrs. Banks in dinner theatres around the country.

A revival opened on Broadway at the Cort Theater on February 16, 2006, and closed on May 21, 2006, after 109 performances. The cast included Amanda Peet (Corie), Patrick Wilson (Paul), Jill Clayburgh (Mrs. Banks), and Tony Roberts (Victor). The revival was directed by Scott Elliott.

A revival production toured the United Kingdom in 2012. The cast included Maureen Lipman, Faye Castelow, Dominic Tighe, and Oliver Cotton. The play was directed by Lipman in partnership with Peter Cregeen.

== Plot ==
Corie and Paul Bratter are a newlywed couple. For their first home, they live in an apartment on the top floor of a brownstone in New York City. Corie is optimistic about their future together, while Paul, the more anxious and grounded half of the couple, worries about the various flaws in the apartment, such as a hole in the skylight, their leaky closet, and the lack of a bathtub. Shortly after moving in, Corie attempts to set her mother up with their eccentric neighbor Mr. Velasco. During the course of four days, the couple learns to live together while facing the usual daily ups-and-downs. Corie wants Paul to become more easy-going: for example, to run "barefoot in the park".

== Critical reception ==
According to theatre historian Jordan Schildcrout, "Most critics noted that Barefoot in the Park has 'a dime-a-dozen premise [and] virtually no plot' (Variety) and 'is about nothing at all' (Herald Tribune). But they also praised Simon as a 'highly skilled professional writer' (New York Times) who used this simple dramatic situation to create 'one of the funniest comedies ever' (Life)." Some critics credited director Mike Nichols for making the play "consistently funnier than its modest dialogue seemed to entitle it to be" (New York Times). On the basis of strong reviews and even stronger word of mouth, the Broadway production became a sold-out hit, causing the Biltmore Theatre to double the number of staff in its box-office to deal with the demand for tickets.

== Adaptations ==
Simon adapted his play for a 1967 feature film, directed by Gene Saks and starring Robert Redford, Jane Fonda, Mildred Natwick and Charles Boyer.

A television series based on the play began on ABC in September 1970. It was an African American situation comedy which ran for twelve weeks. The show featured Scoey Mitchell and Tracy Reed as a "young middle-class couple living in a New York City apartment and struggling through the first years of marriage." This was one of two television series based on Neil Simon plays to debut on the network that month, the other being The Odd Couple.

A production of Barefoot in the Park ran at the Moore Theater in Seattle for one week in late 1981; it was taped for a made-for-TV movie by HBO. The play—and movie—starred Richard Thomas as Paul, Bess Armstrong as Corie, Barbara Barrie as Mrs. Banks, and Hans Conried as Velasco. It was initially telecast in March 1982. The reviewer for UPI wrote: "Richard Thomas—light years removed from the John Boy image of his youth—is superb as Paul Bratter, the buttoned-down young lawyer struggling to come to terms with the elfin free spirit with whom he finds himself honeymooning. Bess Armstrong glows in the role of his wife, Corie, but Barbara Barrie virtually walks away with the show as her bemused mother."

== Awards and nominations ==
=== Original Broadway production ===
Year	Award	Category	Nominee	Result
1964	Tony Award	Best Play		Nominated
1964	Tony Award	Best Actress in a Play	Elizabeth Ashley	Nominated
1964	Tony Award	Best Direction of a Play	Mike Nichols	Won
1964	Tony Award	Best Producer	Saint Subber	Nominated
