= Playmates (1972 film) =

- Written by: Richard Baer
- Directed by: Theodore J. Flicker
- Starring: Alan Alda; Connie Stevens; Barbara Feldon; Doug McClure
- Music by: Jack Elliott; Allyn Ferguson
- Country of origin: United States
- Original language: English

Production
- Producer: Lillian Gallo
- Cinematography: Joseph Biroc
- Editor: Lovel Ellis
- Running time: 74 minutes
- Production companies: ABC Circle Films

Original release
- Network: ABC
- Release: October 3, 1972

Playmates is a 1972 American made-for-television romantic comedy film starring Alan Alda, Connie Stevens, Barbara Feldon, Doug McClure and directed by Theodore J. Flicker. It originally aired as the ABC Movie of the Week on October 3, 1972.

Stevens called it "Bob & Carol & Ted & Alice that doesn't cop out at the key moment."

== Plot ==
Marshall and Kermit are two good friends who are divorced from their respective wives. While Marshall is a well-educated lawyer who runs his own practice, Kermit is a welder who makes minimum wage. One weekend, Marshall hosts his ex-wife Lois, Kermit, and Kermit's ex-wife Patti for a meal at his apartment. The men get friendly with each other's former spouses, leading to romantic entanglements.

== Cast ==
- Alan Alda as Marshall Barnett
- Connie Stevens as Patti Holvey
- Barbara Feldon as Lois Barnett
- Doug McClure as Kermit Holvey
- Eileen Brennan as Amy
- Roger Bowen as Kiddieland father
- Severn Darden as Roger, man in art gallery

== Reception ==
The Los Angeles Times said it "packs a wallop". The Village Voice was more critical, noting that in the film, "women come off as fools whose interests are to be ridiculed. Intellectuals come off as impotent frauds unable to be good in bed or in things cultural. Working men come off as boors, unable to appreciate anything except to worship status and money".

This was a large ratings success, ranking among the 20 most viewed films on TV for a time.
