= Barefoot in the Park (film) =

1967 film by Gene Saks

- Theatrical release poster
- Directed by: Gene Saks
- Screenplay by: Neil Simon
- Based on: Barefoot in the Park; 1963 play by Neil Simon
- Produced by: Hal B. Wallis
- Starring: Robert Redford; Jane Fonda; Charles Boyer; Mildred Natwick
- Cinematography: Joseph LaShelle
- Edited by: William Lyon
- Music by: Neal Hefti
- Production companies: Hal Wallis Productions; Nancy Enterprises Inc.
- Distributed by: Paramount Pictures
- Release date: May 25, 1967
- Running time: 106 minutes
- Country: United States
- Language: English
- Budget: $2 million
- Box office: $30 million

Barefoot in the Park is a 1967 American romantic comedy film directed by Gene Saks from a screenplay by Neil Simon, adapted from his 1963 play of the same name, starring Robert Redford and Jane Fonda as a young newlywed couple. Paul, a conservative lawyer, marries the vivacious Corie, but their highly passionate relationship descends into comical discord in a five-flight New York City walk-up apartment. The supporting cast features Charles Boyer, Mildred Natwick, Herbert Edelman, and Mabel Albertson.

Barefoot in the Park was released theatrically by Paramount Pictures on May 25, 1967, to critical and commercial success, with critics praising its adaptation, light-hearted tone, and cast performances. The film grossed $30 million worldwide on a $2 million budget. For their performances in the film, Natwick was nominated for the Academy Award for Best Supporting Actress and Fonda was nominated for the BAFTA Award for Best Actress. Simon received a nomination for the Writers Guild of America Award for Best Adapted Screenplay.

== Plot ==
After a torrid week-long honeymoon at the Plaza Hotel, free-spirited Corie Bratter and husband, Paul, a conservative, uptight young attorney, move into a fifth-floor Greenwich Village apartment which has no elevator. Corie decorates the small, leaky space, turning it into a picturesque home.

Among their many eccentric neighbors is the quirky Victor Velasco, who befriends Corie and flirts with her. He lives in the building's attic, so he climbs through the Bratters' window to get to his apartment. He also helps Corie with their place, showing her how to work the heating and plumbing.

Corie sets up a dinner date with Paul, Victor, and Corie's mother, Ethel Banks, in a scheme to make her mother fall for Victor. Victor takes them all to an Albanian restaurant on Staten Island. There, the group drinks, and Corie and Victor dance with a belly dancer, while Paul and Ethel watch in embarrassment.

Afterward, Corie and Victor return to their building in high spirits as Paul and Ethel drag themselves along in fatigue. As Victor escorts Ethel outside, Corie and Paul argue over their different personalities. Corie feels that her adventurous spirit is impeded by Paul's cautious attitude, noting that he refused to go barefoot in the park with her one evening. His excuse was that it was freezing. They eventually go to sleep, Corie in their tiny bedroom and Paul on the couch under a hole in the skylight on a snowy February night.

The next day, Paul comes down with a fever, but Corie still insists she wants a divorce. The two spend an awkward time in their apartment until Corie kicks Paul out. She then receives a call from her aunt, who says that Ethel never came home.

Corie eventually learns that her mother was at Victor's apartment. While Victor was escorting her to her home in New Jersey the previous night, Ethel slipped on icy stairs and fell. Victor and some neighbors took her back to Victor's apartment, where they spent the night.

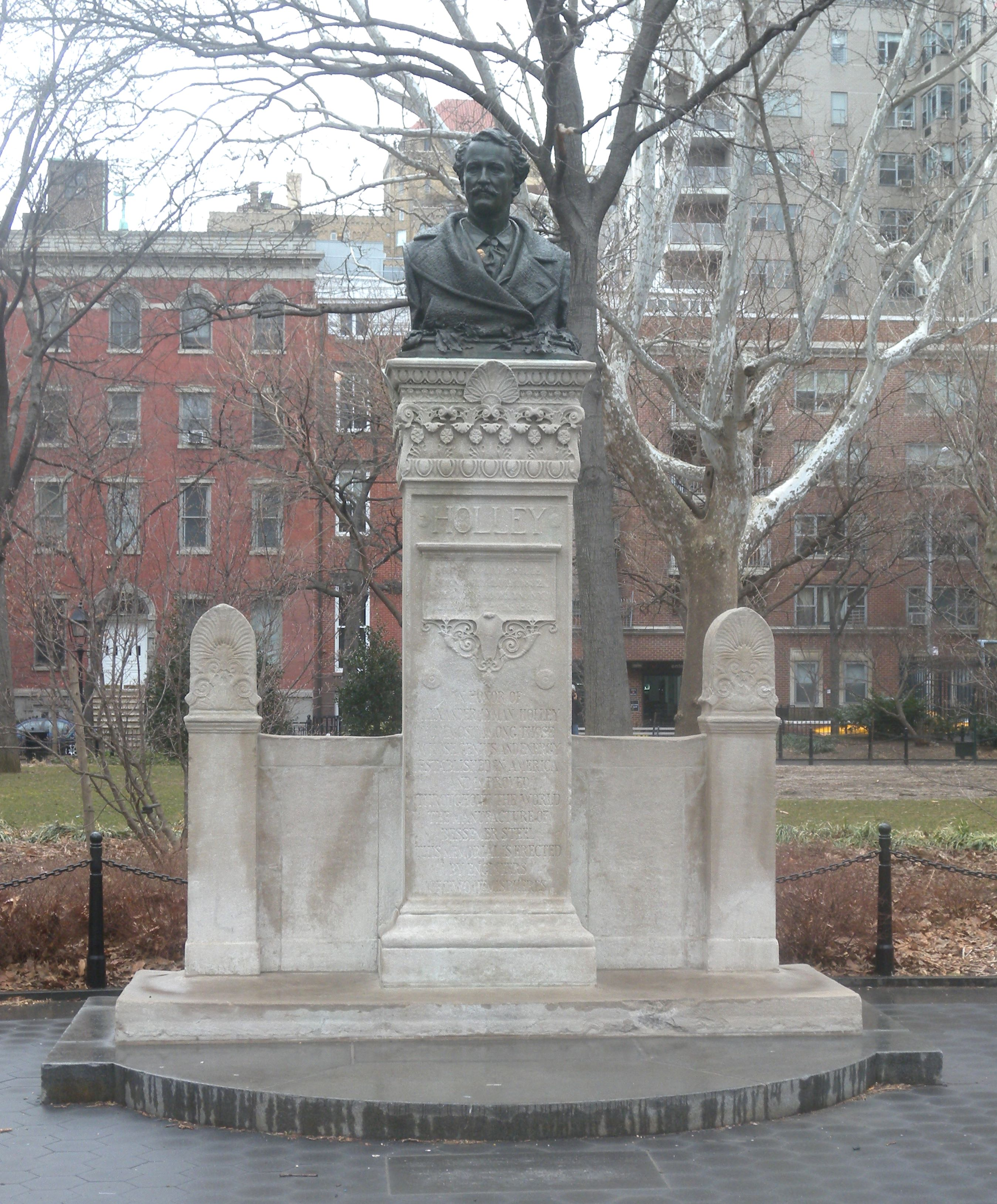
Washington Square Park's Alexander Lyman Holley monument, where Corie finds a drunken Paul late in the film

Meanwhile, a drunken Paul skips work and sits in Washington Square Park. Heeding her mother's advice, Corie goes out searching for Paul and finds him drunk and running barefoot through the park. The once cautious Paul is now a fun-loving drunk while Corie chases him in order to get him to sober up. Eventually, Paul says it is his apartment and he is going home. Corie follows.

Back at the apartment, the still drunk Paul climbs onto the roof of the apartment. Realizing where he is, he becomes scared, and almost falls off the building. Corie asks Paul to sing an Albanian folk song they had heard at the restaurant to calm himself down.

While Paul sings, Corie climbs up to the roof to help him down. A crowd of onlookers gathers in the street, including Ethel and Victor. When Corie reaches Paul, they kiss and climb back down as the crowd cheers.

== Cast ==
- Robert Redford as Paul Bratter
- Jane Fonda as Corie Bratter
- Charles Boyer as Victor Velasco
- Mildred Natwick as Ethel Banks
- Herbert Edelman as Harry Pepper
- Mabel Albertson as Harriet
- Fritz Feld as restaurant proprietor
- James F. Stone as delivery man
- Ted Hartley as Frank

== Reception ==
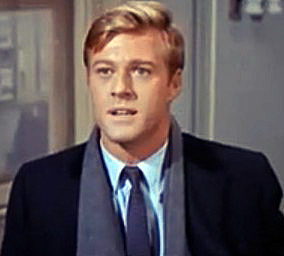
Robert Redford in Barefoot in the Park

Barefoot in the Park opened to positive reviews at the time of its release, although later reviews have been mixed. On Rotten Tomatoes, the film holds an approval rating of 81% based on 53 reviews, with an average rating of 7.2/10. The website's critical consensus reads: "Barefoot in the Park may strike some modern viewers as dated, but what it lacks in timeliness, it more than makes up with the effervescent chemistry between its stars". On Metacritic, which assigns a rating to reviews, the film has a weighted average score of 55 out of 100, based on 8 critics, indicating "mixed or average" reviews.

Bosley Crowther of The New York Times wrote, "If it's romantic farce you delight in – old-fashioned romantic farce loaded with incongruities and snappy verbal gags – then you should find the movie version of Barefoot in the Park to your taste ... But if you are in for a certain measure of intelligence and plausibility in what is presumed to be take-out of what might happen to reckless newlyweds today; if you expect a wisp of logic in the make-up of comic characters, which is, after all, what makes them funny, instead of sheer gagging it up, then beware." Arthur D. Murphy of Variety called the film "a thoroughly entertaining comedy delight about young marriage." Charles Champlin of the Los Angeles Times stated, "High-gloss, low-density comedy requires a special touch and Robert Redford and Jane Fonda handle themselves with a fine, deft charm ... As after a souffle, you may shortly be hungry for something more substantial but while it lasts it's very tasty." Brendan Gill of The New Yorker called the film "a funny adaptation by Neil Simon of his funny play." Leo Sullivan of The Washington Post wrote, "An excellent cast plays the light-as-air plot as coolly as possible. What's most important, it is as funny as ever it was and makes an ideal summer attraction."

Barefoot in the Park spent a record 12 weeks at Radio City Music Hall in New York City grossing a house record $2.3 million.

=== Accolades ===
Ceremony	Category	Recipient	Result
Academy Awards	Best Supporting Actress	Mildred Natwick	Nominated
British Academy Film Awards	Best Foreign Actress	Jane Fonda	Nominated
Laurel Awards	Top Comedy	Barefoot in the Park	4th Place
Laurel Awards	Top Male Comedy Performance	Robert Redford	Nominated
Laurel Awards	Top Female Comedy Performance	Jane Fonda	Nominated
Laurel Awards	Top Female Supporting Performance	Mildred Natwick	Nominated
Writers Guild of America Awards	Best Written American Comedy	Neil Simon	Nominated

In 2002, the film ranked number 96 on AFI's 100 Years... 100 Passions.

== See also ==
- List of American films of 1967
