= I Am Omega =

2007 American doomsday film by Griff Furst

- DVD cover
- Directed by: Griff Furst
- Screenplay by: Geoff Meed
- Based on: I Am Legend by Richard Matheson (uncredited)
- Produced by: David Michael Latt; David Rimawi; Paul Bales
- Starring: Mark Dacascos; Geoff Meed; Jennifer Lee Wiggins; Ryan Lloyd
- Cinematography: Alexander Yellen
- Distributed by: The Asylum
- Release date: November 18, 2007
- Running time: 90 minutes
- Country: United States
- Language: English

I Am Omega, stylized as I Am Ωmega, is a 2007 American direct-to-DVD post-apocalyptic science fiction thriller film produced by The Asylum and starring Mark Dacascos. The film is an unofficial and uncredited adaptation of the 1954 novel I Am Legend by Richard Matheson, the title being a reference to the 1971 film adaptation The Omega Man. The movie was intentionally released as a "mockbuster" to capitalize on the release of the theatrical film I Am Legend of the same year.

== Plot ==
The film takes place in a post-apocalyptic Los Angeles, which is overrun by zombie-like, cannibalistic humans who have degenerated into a feral subspecies as the result of a genetic infection. The film does not make clear if the virus has infected the entire world, or just a small, isolated area, but it is suggested that it is global by the inability of the hero, Renchard (Mark Dacascos), to locate radio signals or contact anyone via the Internet.

Renchard has been forced to live in a daily struggle for survival against the mutants. One day, Renchard is contacted via webcam by Brianna (Jennifer Lee Wiggins), another survivor who was stranded in L.A. while trying to find Antioch, a community of survivors. She asks Renchard to help her, but Renchard, who has placed time bombs at strategic points around the city, refuses.

Two men (the film's screenwriter Geoff Meed and Ryan Lloyd) claiming to be from Antioch arrive at his home seeking his aid. Although initially unpersuaded by their argument that Brianna carries the cure to the virus in her blood, Renchard is forced to cooperate under gunpoint. With 24 hours before the bombs are set to detonate, he leads the men into the city. They must find and free Brianna before the mutants or the bombs can destroy them. After Renchard and Brianna flee the city and Mike (Ryan Lloyd) is killed in the sewers, Vincent (Geoff Meed) shoots Renchard and captures Brianna. He tells Renchard he did it because he liked the world the way it was and leaves him to die. After Renchard recovers his strength, he hotwires a car and chases after Vincent to save Brianna.

After finding them, Renchard kills Vincent, who was attempting to rape and kill Brianna. The bombs explode, and they both head to Antioch to make a cure. However, it is revealed that a single zombie has survived the explosion.

== Critical response ==
This low-budget, direct-to-video film was hurried into production and released a month prior to the big budget Will Smith film I Am Legend in an attempt to cash in on the similar-sounding titles and plots.

This has led to some confusion among film fans, which is no doubt the intention of film distributor The Asylum, which have used this marketing strategy in the past with such other confusingly-titled films as 30,000 Leagues Under the Sea, Transmorphers, The Da Vinci Treasure and Snakes on a Train.

Critics had few good things to say about the film. Matt Bradshaw said, "The film starts off with a modest amount of promise, but when the story veers away from the film it's aping things quickly go down hill." The San Diego Union Tribune said satirically that the film is "The long-awaited prequel to Animal House, in which Bluto's secret pact with that reviled rival frat is finally revealed?"

Film Critics United said that "As far as flicks from The Asylum go, I Am Omega is their best one yet, at least of the ones I've seen. Admittedly this includes fare such as Snakes on a Train, Transmorphers and Super Croc, all surely among the worst films ever made, but for a little while at least I Am Omega was more than just a 'good flick for Asylum standards' but just a plain old decent flick. For a little while at least."

== Cast ==
- Mark Dacascos as Renchard
- Geoff Meed as Vincent
- Jennifer Lee Wiggins as Brianna
- Ryan Lloyd as Mike
- Gregory Paul Smith as Various Zombies

== See also ==
- The Last Man on Earth starring Vincent Price
