= Rituals (TV series) =

American soap opera (1984–1985)

- Genre: Soap opera
- Based on: Rituals by Charlene Keel
- Developed by: Gene Palumbo; Clifford Champion; Joyce Corrington; John William Corrington
- Written by: Gene Palumbo; Ray Goldstone
- Country of origin: United States
- Original language: English
- No. of seasons: 1
- No. of episodes: 260

Production
- Executive producers: Frank Konigsberg; Larry Sanitsky
- Producer: Jørn Winther
- Production locations: Metromedia Square, Hollywood; Elon College, Elon, North Carolina (on-location campus shoots)
- Camera setup: Multi-camera
- Running time: 25 minutes
- Production companies: Metromedia Inc. Telepictures Productions

Original release
- Network: First-run syndication
- Release: September 10, 1984 – September 6, 1985

Rituals is an American soap opera that aired in first-run syndication from September 10, 1984, to September 6, 1985. Developed by Gene Palumbo, Clifford Champion, Joyce Corrington and John William Corrington, it was loosely based on a novel of the same name by Charlene Keel. Distributed by Telepictures, 260 25-minute episodes were produced over its single-season run.

== Storylines ==
The show took place in the fictional Virginia town of Wingfield. The community was the home of Wingfield Mills and Chapin Industries, the town's leading employers. Also located in Wingfield was a boarding school for girls called Haddon Hall. The story focused on the Chapin, Gallagher and Robertson families and the people who were connected with them either socially or professionally.

The story began with the death of Chapin family matriarch Katherine, and while everyone mourned her, her long-absent daughter, Taylor, stepped off a helicopter holding a racehorse's victory wreath. Katherine's will was read, setting off a round of battles and squabbles over the will.

Much of the focus of the show was set at Haddon Hall, which was run by president Carter Robertson, who didn't much like the Chapin family. Even when he was discovered to be Patrick Chapin's illegitimate son, he didn't change his views on the family. He was married to Christina Robertson, whose sister, Sara, was married to sleazy Eddie Gallagher, a working-class man, who was shot and killed in self-defense by his daughter, Haddon Hall student Noel, for years of physical and sexual abuse. (This was the result of an on-air contest to discover the victim, the killer, and the motive.)

The series ended its syndicated run in 1985.

== Characters ==
=== The Robertsons ===
- Carter Robertson Chapin (Monte Markham) Husband of Christina and Headmaster of girls school, Haddon Hall. He is the illegitimate son of Patrick Chapin (and was originally thought to be the son of the Chapin family butler), father of Jeff. Was run down by a car, and used a wheelchair for mobility. After he divorced Christina, he later married Marissa Mallory (but annulled it when it was revealed he was still married to Christina); and after his divorce was finalized, married Christina's youngest sister, Lisa.
- Christina Robertson Chapin (née Thompson) (Christine Jones) Wife of Carter and sister of Sara Gallagher and Lisa Thompson. She was a close friend of the late Katherine Chapin and was given the Chapin Diamond as a result. She later divorced Carter (in between she had an affair with Patrick Chapin, which led to his death and enmity with his daughter, Taylor Von Platen) and eventually attempted to marry C.J. Field, but she shot and wounded him and killed Sara. She and C.J. divorced after realizing she couldn't live with having killed her sister. As a result of what happened, she later became a nun and spoke the final lines in the series, "Each person's life is unique, but the rituals remain the same."
- Jeff Robertson Chapin (Tim Maier) Son of Carter and Christina. In the beginning, a student at Harvard, but after being beaten up by Eddie Gallagher, lived in Wingfield again. Best friend of Brady Chapin, who later became his uncle. Turns out to be as scheming as his parents were.

=== The Chapins ===
- Patrick Chapin (Dennis Patrick) Head of the Chapin family. Head of Wingfield Mills and Chapin Industries, as well as one of the wealthiest people in Wingfield. The Chapin family, who live at an estate called The Willows, also were the founders of Haddon Hall, Wingfield's local women's college (Oakwood was the male equivalent of Haddon Hall, and was not that far away from Wingfield). He is the father of Brady, Taylor, Carter Robertson and Michele Davenport (via Sarah Gallagher); and the grandfather of Julia Field. The funeral of his wife, Katherine (née Haddon), was the opening scene of the show which eventually sets in motion most of the plotlines. He eventually died himself as a result of a heart attack, while in a romantic clinch with Christina Robertson, who had fallen in love with him.
- Brady Chapin (Marc Poppel in 1984, Jon Lindstrom from 1984–1985) Son of Patrick, brother of Taylor, and half-brother of Carter Robertson and Michele Davenport. He is an irresponsible playboy (who also had a cocaine addiction), but was also a champion horseback rider. He fell in love with Dakota Lane, aggravating his ex-girlfriend, Noel Gallagher. He eventually married Dakota and they had a child together.
- Taylor Von Platen (née Chapin) (Jo Ann Pflug in 1984, Tina Louise from 1984–1985) Daughter of Patrick, sister of Brady, and half-sister of Carter Robertson and Michele Davenport. Head of the board of trustees at Haddon Hall. a crassly materialistic and money-mad woman, she was married five times (one of which was to C.J. Field, with whom she procreated Julia). Taylor is resented by her daughter (due to her continual neglecting of her) and they clashed repeatedly. She made her first appearance interrupting her mother's funeral by stepping off a helicopter with a race horse's victory wreath. She is also involved with Logan Williams, although she is angered at him for being the executor of her mother's will. She had affairs with a lot of men, including Bernhardt Kraus (mainly to aggravate Julia). She gained a personal assistant in hard-working student Patty DuPont, whom she matched up with Bernhardt. Had a rivalry with Christina Robertson when she embarked on an affair with her father.
  - Carson "C.J." Field (Peter Haskell) Wealthy former husband of Taylor Chapin and father of Julia. He helped the Chapin family out of financial straits when he married Taylor. He became Governor of Virginia and fell in love with Sarah Gallagher after her first husband's death. They were engaged and were happy until her sister, Christina, killed her and wounded him. He married Christina, but they divorced soon after the marriage because she couldn't live with what she had done to them. Was once married to a woman named Margot and had a son named Mark with her. Was in love with Sarah Gallagher, but was shot by her sister, Christina, whom he later married and divorced soon after.
  - Julia Chapin Field (Andrea Moar) Daughter of Taylor Chapin and C.J. Field. She resents her absentee mother, Taylor (with whom she clashes repeatedly over the series run), which prompts her to have a closer relationship with her father (which came over time as she felt neglected by him as well). In order for her to acquire her grandmother, Katherine's jewelry, she has to remain in Wingfield and graduate from Haddon Hall, which she did. At first very headstrong and spoiled (due to her parents neglect), but with time, she mellows and becomes more mature, becoming Dakota Lane's closest friend and staunchest supporter. Has doomed relationships with Logan Williams (which her mother stopped); Bernhardt Kraus (whom she was engaged to, which was also stopped by her mother) and Luther "Lucky" Washington (which was again stopped but by her whole family this time), half-sister of Mark Field.

=== The Gallaghers ===
- Eddie Gallagher (Greg Mullavey) Husband of Sara, and father of Tom and Noel Gallagher. He is the brother of Mike. Eddie owns a Motel and Bar called Gallagher's and once worked at Wingfield Mills. A very vicious, brutal and evil individual (he attacked and viciously assaulted Jeff Robertson Chapin) who is quite abusive towards his family. He is murdered in self-defense by his once-loyal daughter, Noel, for physically and sexually abusing her.
- Tom Gallagher (Kevin Spirtas) Son of Eddie and Sara, brother of Noel, half-brother of Michele Davenport. A police officer later security guard. Despises his father (who drove him out of town two years previously, which had him go into the military), and will protect his mother and sister from his wrath. Husband of Diandra Santiago, whom he met while he was a soldier in her home country of San Rafael. Upon his return, Eddie threw him and Diandra out of his house. This only cements his hatred towards his father. He later died as a result of radiation poisoning at a power plant he was guarding. Diandra returned to San Rafael and raised their child (he never knew that the child's father was really his uncle, Mike) alone.
- Mike Gallagher (Kin Shriner) Half-brother of Eddie. Husband of Lacey Jarrett. An artist and art teacher at Haddon Hall. He and Lacey have issues with adopting a child. Had an affair with his nephew's wife, Diandra, and they gave birth to a daughter. He and Lacey divorce acrimoniously and he leaves town on his motorcycle.
- Diandra Santiago Gallagher (Gina Gallego) Wife of Tom Gallagher. She is the niece of a former Latin-American politician named Enrique Santiago. She came from the country of San Rafael. Eventually returns there to raise her child with Tom (really Mike, but Tom never knew that) alone after his untimely death from radiation poisoning.
- Lacey Jarrett Gallagher (Philece Sampler) Wife of Mike Gallagher. She is a physical education teacher at Haddon Hall, who later became the school's Dean of Women and then much later on, became the first female president of the school. Adopted mother of Katie Burns. She and Mike divorced and he left town, but she remained in Wingfield.
- Sara Gallagher (née Thompson) (Lorrine Vozoff in 1984, Laurie Burton from 1984–1985) Wife of Eddie Gallagher, and mother of Tom and Noel. Later revealed to be the mother of Michele Davenport (via Patrick Chapin, which explained a large sum of money she had been willed by him. She is the sister of wealthier Christina Robertson, and tends to be kinder and more down-to-earth than her sister. She also has a younger (and more troublemaking) sister named Lisa, who later married her former brother in-law, Carter Chapin. She and Eddie owned a motel and bar called Gallagher's. She is killed by Christina, and her daughter, Michele, took over management of the motel and bar.
- Noel Gallagher (Karen Kelly) Scheming daughter of Eddie and Sara Gallagher, and sister of Tom; she later gained a half-sister in Michele Davenport. She is a student at Haddon Hall, who is wanting to be a singer. At first, she idolized her father and did whatever he told her to do, until it came out that he abused her both physically and sexually. She later killed him in self-defense and revealed this at her mother's murder trial. At first in love with Brady Chapin (he wasn't in love with her, but was smitten with Dakota Lane), but she later realizes that Brady was unattainable, and as such, falls for Brady's nephew (and former best friend), Jeff Robertson Chapin.

=== The Washingtons ===
- Maddie Washington (Ketty Lester and Lynn Hamilton) The Chapin family housekeeper, and mother of Lucky.
- Luther "Lucky" Washington (Randy Brooks in 1984, Lawrence Hilton-Jacobs from 1984–1985) Son of Maddie Washington, an investigator, who embarked on a doomed interracial affair with Julia Field.

=== The Lanes ===
- Dakota "Koty" Lane (Claire Yarlett in 1984, Mary Beth Evans from 1984–1985) An actress, daughter of Cherry Lane. She eventually fell in love with wealthy Brady Chapin, and gained a champion and close friend in his niece, Julia Chapin Field. Had a brain tumor which was successfully operated on (Brady, Julia and her mother were at her side during this time). She gave birth to a child (the father was Mike Gallagher), and she gave the child to Lacey. She and Brady finally married and had a child together.
- Cherry Lane' (Sharon Farrell) Mother of Dakota Lane. A masseuse who wanted to be a singer. She was a bona fide survivor, but she was always looking out for her daughter's best interests. She eventually married a researcher named Roger Gibson.

=== Other characters ===
- Logan Williams (George Lazenby) A successful and published playwright, and a former paramour of Taylor Chapin. Executor of Katherine Chapin's will, which angered Taylor.
- Marissa Mallory (Patti Davis in 1984, Janice Heiden from 1984–1985) A scheming research assistant at Chapin Industries. She later married Carter Robertson, but it was annulled by Carter himself after he wasn't divorced from Christina (and also done to her out of sheer spite to keep her away from his newfound wealth, as he had been revealed to be Patrick Chapin's son at that same time). This led to Marissa teaming with Christina to get revenge on him.
- Bernhardt Kraus (Cameron Smith) A scheming businessman who was once engaged to Julia Field, but was forced to break up with her by Taylor and was manipulated into marriage to Taylor's personal assistant, Patty DuPont. However, he truly fell in love with Patty and they left Wingfield happily.
- Michele Davenport (Kelly Bennett) Secretary for Carter Robertson Chapin. She had an affair with him, which later caused her to be fired. She teamed up with Carter's ex-wife, Christina, to get even with him. She later revealed to have been the daughter of Sarah Gallagher and Patrick Chapin. After her mother's death, she managed the motel and bar she had owned.
- Lisa Thompson Chapin (Wesley Ann Pfenning) Scheming youngest sister of Sara Gallagher and Christina Robertson, a former prostitute from Washington, D.C., who came at the behest of Christina. She later married Christina's former husband, Carter Chapin.
- Patty DuPont (Winifred Freedman) A plain-Jane but very hard working student at Haddon Hall who later became Taylor Von Platen's personal assistant. She was also the former roommate of Taylor's daughter, Julia Field. She married Julia's ex-fiancé, Bernhardt Kraus after the scheming Taylor matched them up. She and Bernhardt truly fell in love and they left Wingfield happily.

== Broadcast ==
The series later aired in France from 1989 to 1990 under the name La Ligne de Chance and Brazil from 1989 to 1990 under the name Rituais da Vida (Rituals of Life).
