= I Am Legend (film) =

2007 film by Francis Lawrence

- Theatrical release poster
- Directed by: Francis Lawrence
- Screenplay by: Mark Protosevich; Akiva Goldsman
- Based on: I Am Legend by Richard Matheson; The Omega Man by; John William Corrington; Joyce H. Corrington
- Produced by: Akiva Goldsman; James Lassiter; David Heyman; Neal Moritz
- Starring: Will Smith; Alice Braga; Dash Mihok
- Cinematography: Andrew Lesnie
- Edited by: Wayne Wahrman
- Music by: James Newton Howard
- Production companies: Village Roadshow Pictures; Weed Road Pictures; Overbrook Entertainment; Rose City Pictures
- Distributed by: Warner Bros. Pictures
- Release date: December 14, 2007 (United States)
- Running time: 101 minutes
- Country: United States
- Language: English
- Budget: $150 million
- Box office: $585 million

I Am Legend is a 2007 American post-apocalyptic action horror thriller film directed by Francis Lawrence from a screenplay by Akiva Goldsman and Mark Protosevich and starring Will Smith as U.S. Army virologist Robert Neville. Loosely based on the 1954 novel of the same name by Richard Matheson, the film is set in New York City after a virus, which was originally created to cure cancer, has wiped out most of mankind, leaving Neville as the last human in New York City, other than nocturnal mutants. Immune to the virus, Neville works to develop a cure while defending himself against the hostile mutants. It is the third feature-film adaptation of Matheson's novel following 1964's The Last Man on Earth and 1971's The Omega Man.

Warner Bros. Pictures began developing I Am Legend in 1994, and various actors and directors were attached to the project, though production was delayed due to budgetary concerns related to the script. Production began in 2006 in New York City, filming mainly on location in the city, including a $5 million scene at the Brooklyn Bridge.

I Am Legend was released on December 14, 2007, in the United States and Canada. It opened to the largest-ever box office (not adjusted for inflation) for a non-Christmas film released in the U.S. in December, and was the seventh-highest-grossing film of 2007, earning $256 million domestically and $329 million internationally for a total of $585 million. The film received generally positive reviews, with Smith's performance being singled out for praise, while criticism focused on its divergences from the novel, particularly the ending. In 2022, a sequel was revealed to be in development, with Smith set to reprise his role as Neville and co-produce the film with Michael B. Jordan, who will also have a starring role.

== Plot ==
In 2009, a genetically engineered measles virus designed to cure cancer mutated and killed 90% of the human population, and transformed another 9% into vampiric-zombies known as Darkseekers, who hunt for immune humans at night as they are vulnerable to sunlight.

In 2012, three years after the outbreak, U.S. Army virologist LTC Robert Neville and his German Shepherd, Sam, live in a heavily fortified Washington Square Park home in deserted Manhattan. Neville's daily routine includes experimenting on rats to find a cure for the virus, searching the city for supplies, and waiting each day for survivors to respond to his recorded radio broadcasts to meet him at the South Street Seaport by noon. At night, he barricades himself with Sam inside his home. Neville is haunted by memories of his wife Zoe and daughter Marley, who died in a helicopter accident during the chaotic evacuation.

While Neville hunts a deer, Sam pursues it into a building populated with Darkseekers. Neville and Sam narrowly escape. Neville sets a trap with his immune blood and captures a female Darkseeker to use as a subject for his treatment. An alpha Darkseeker pursues them but is halted by sunlight. Neville's treatment of the Darkseeker seems unsuccessful.

Neville notices a mannequin placed outside Grand Central Terminal. As he approaches it, he is caught in a trap and loses consciousness. He awakes at dusk and the Alpha unleashes infected dogs. Neville frees himself and subdues the dogs, but Sam is bitten. Back in his lab, Neville injects her with his serum to no avail. Sam begins to transform and Neville strangles her. Neville assaults the Darkseekers with his car, but is vastly outnumbered. He is rescued by immune survivors Anna and Ethan, who heard his broadcast.

They take Neville home, where Anna explains they survived on a Red Cross ship from São Paulo, and are heading to a survivors camp in Bethel, Vermont. Neville says no such camp exists. Working to cure the female Darkseeker, Neville suggests cooling her with ice to improve treatment. Darkseekers launch an invasion on the house. Neville, Anna, and Ethan seal themselves in the basement laboratory with the test subject where Neville discovers the female Darkseeker is slowly turning back to human. The Alpha Darkseeker begins breaking through the glass door.

=== Theatrical ending ===
Neville draws a vial of blood from the cured Darkseeker and gives it to Anna before shutting her and Ethan inside a coal chute in the back of the lab. Neville then sacrifices himself, killing the attacking Darkseekers with a grenade.

=== Alternate ending ===
Neville realizes that the Alpha is identifying the woman he was experimenting on by a butterfly tattoo, and that it wants her back. Neville puts his gun down and returns the infected woman. He and the Alpha then exchange stares; Neville apologizes to them, which the Alpha acknowledges before the infected leave. Neville, Anna, and Ethan drive away towards Vermont.

== Cast ==
- Will Smith as Dr. Robert Neville, a virologist and the sole remaining human inhabitant in New York City, searching for a cure to the virus
- Alice Braga as Anna, a religious survivor of the outbreak
- Charlie Tahan as Ethan, a young survivor of the outbreak
- Abbey and Kona as Samantha ("Sam"), Robert's German Shepherd and partner, a gift from Marley shortly before her death
- Dash Mihok as Alpha Male, the leader of a pack of Darkseekers
- Emma Thompson as Dr. Alice Krippin, the creator of the Krippin Virus
- Salli Richardson as Zoe Neville, Robert Neville's wife who died shortly after the outbreak
- Willow Smith as Marley Neville, Robert and Zoe's six-year-old daughter, who died shortly after the outbreak
- Joanna Numata as Alpha Female, the alpha Male's partner, who is captured and experimented on by Robert Neville
- Darrell Foster as Mike, a soldier who accompanied Neville during the initial stages of the outbreak
- Pat Fraley as voice of the President of the United States
- Mike Patton as voices of the Darkseekers, violent mutants infected by the Krippin Virus, who are vulnerable to sunlight

== Production ==
=== Development ===
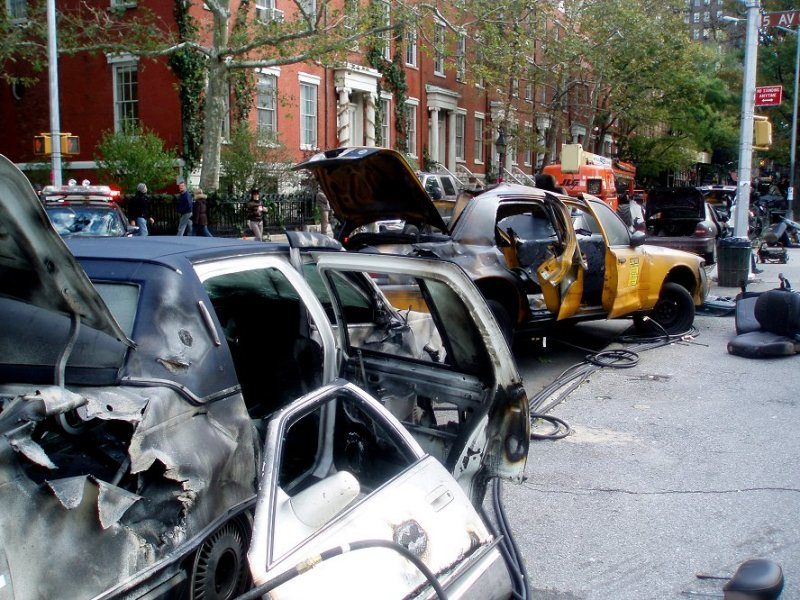
Washington Square during production in 2006. In the background is the house where Will Smith's character lives.

The science-fiction horror genre re-emerged in the late 1990s. In 1995, Warner Bros. Pictures began developing the film project, having owned the rights to Richard Matheson's 1954 novel I Am Legend since 1970 and having already made the 1971 adaptation The Omega Man. Mark Protosevich was hired to write the script after the studio was impressed with his speculative script of The Cell. Protosevich's first draft took place in 2000 in San Francisco, and contained many similarities with the finished film, though the Darkseekers (called Hemocytes) were civilized to the point of the creatures in The Omega Man, and Anna was a lone morphine addict, as well as the fact that a Hemocyte character named Christopher joined forces with Neville. Warner Bros. immediately put the film on the fast track, attaching Neal H. Moritz as producer.

Actors Tom Cruise, Michael Douglas, and Mel Gibson had been considered to star in the film, using a script by Protosevich and with Ridley Scott as director; however, by June 1997, the studio's preference was for actor Arnold Schwarzenegger. In July, Scott and Schwarzenegger finalized negotiations, with production slated to begin the coming September, using Houston as a stand-in for the film's setting of Los Angeles. Scott had Protosevich replaced by a screenwriter of his own choosing, John Logan, with whom he spent months of intensive work on a number of different drafts. The Scott–Logan version of I Am Legend was a mix of sci-fi and psychological thriller, without dialogue in the first hour and with a sombre ending. The creatures in Logan's version were similar to the Darkseekers of the finished film in their animalistic, barbaric nature. The studio, fearing its lack of commercial appeal and merchandising potential, began to worry about the liberties they had given Scott – then on a negative streak of box-office disappointments – and urged the production team to reconsider the lack of action in the screenplay. After an "esoteric" draft by writer Neal Jimenez, Warner Bros. reassigned Protosevich to the project, reluctantly working with Scott again.

In December 1997, the project was called into question when the projected budget escalated to $108 million due to media and shareholder scrutiny of the studio in financing a big-budget film. Scott rewrote the script to reduce the film's budget by $20 million but in March 1998, the studio canceled the project due to budgetary concerns and quite possibly to the box office failures of Scott's last three films, 1492: Conquest of Paradise, White Squall, and G.I. Jane. Schwarzenegger's recent films (Eraser and Warner Bros.' own Batman & Robin) also underperformed, and the studio's latest experiences with big budget sci-fi movies Sphere and The Postman were negative as well. In August 1998, director Rob Bowman was attached to the project, with Protosevich hired to write a third new draft, far more action-oriented than his previous versions but the director (who reportedly wished for Nicolas Cage to play the lead) moved on to direct Reign of Fire and the project did not get off the ground.

In March 2002, Schwarzenegger became the producer of I Am Legend, commencing negotiations with Michael Bay to direct and Will Smith to star in the film. Bay and Smith were attracted to the project based on a redraft that would reduce its budget. The project was shelved due to Warner Bros. president Alan F. Horn's dislike of the script. In 2004, Akiva Goldsman was asked by head of production Jeff Robinov to produce the film. In September 2005, director Francis Lawrence signed on to helm the project, with production slated to begin in 2006. Guillermo del Toro was originally approached to direct by Smith, but turned it down to direct Hellboy II: The Golden Army. Lawrence, whose film Constantine was produced by Goldsman, was fascinated by empty urban environments. He said, "Something's always really excited me about that... to have experienced that much loss, to be without people or any kind of social interaction for that long."

Goldsman took on the project, as he admired the second I Am Legend film adaptation, The Omega Man. A rewrite was done to distance the project from the other zombie films inspired by the novel, as well as from the recently released 28 Days Later, although Goldsman was inspired by the scenes of a deserted London in the British horror film to create the scenes of a deserted New York City. A 40-page scene-by-scene outline of the film was developed by May 2006. When delays occurred on Smith's film Hancock, which was scheduled for 2007, it was proposed to switch Smith's films. This meant filming would have to begin in 16 weeks; production was given a green light, using Goldsman's script and the outline. Elements from Protosevich's script were introduced, while the crew consulted with experts on infectious diseases and solitary confinement. Rewrites continued throughout filming, because of Smith's improvisational skills and Lawrence's preference to keep various scenes silent. Lawrence had watched Jane Campion's film The Piano with a low volume so as to not disturb his newborn son and realized that silence could be very effective cinema.

=== Casting ===
Will Smith signed on to play Robert Neville in April 2006. He said he took on I Am Legend because he felt it could be like "Gladiator [or] Forrest Gump—these are movies with wonderful, audience-pleasing elements, but also uncompromised artistic value. [This] always felt like it had those possibilities to me." The actor found Neville to be his toughest acting challenge since portraying Muhammad Ali in Ali (2001). He said that "when you're on your own, it is kind of hard to find conflict." The film's dark tone and exploration of whether Neville has gone insane during his isolation meant Smith had to restrain himself from falling into a humorous routine during takes. To prepare for his role, Smith visited the Centers for Disease Control and Prevention in Georgia. He also met with a person who had been in solitary confinement and a former prisoner of war. Smith compared Neville to Job, who lost his children, livelihood, and health. Like the Book of Job, I Am Legend studies the questions, "Can he find a reason to continue? Can he find the hope or desire to excel and advance in life? Or does the death of everything around him create imminent death for himself?" He also cited an influence in Tom Hanks' performance in Cast Away (2000).

Abbey and Kona, both three-year-old German Shepherd dogs, played Neville's dog Sam. The rest of the supporting cast consists of Salli Richardson as Zoe, Robert's wife, and Alice Braga as a survivor named Anna. Willow Smith, Will Smith's daughter, makes her film debut as Marley, Neville's daughter. Emma Thompson has an uncredited role as Dr. Alice Krippin, who appears on television explaining her cure for cancer that mutates into the virus. Singer Mike Patton provided the guttural screams of the infected "hemocytes", and Dash Mihok provided the character animation for the infected "alpha male". Several filler characters with uncredited roles were in old news broadcasts and flashbacks, such as the unnamed President's voice (Pat Fraley), and the cast of The Today Show.

=== Filming ===
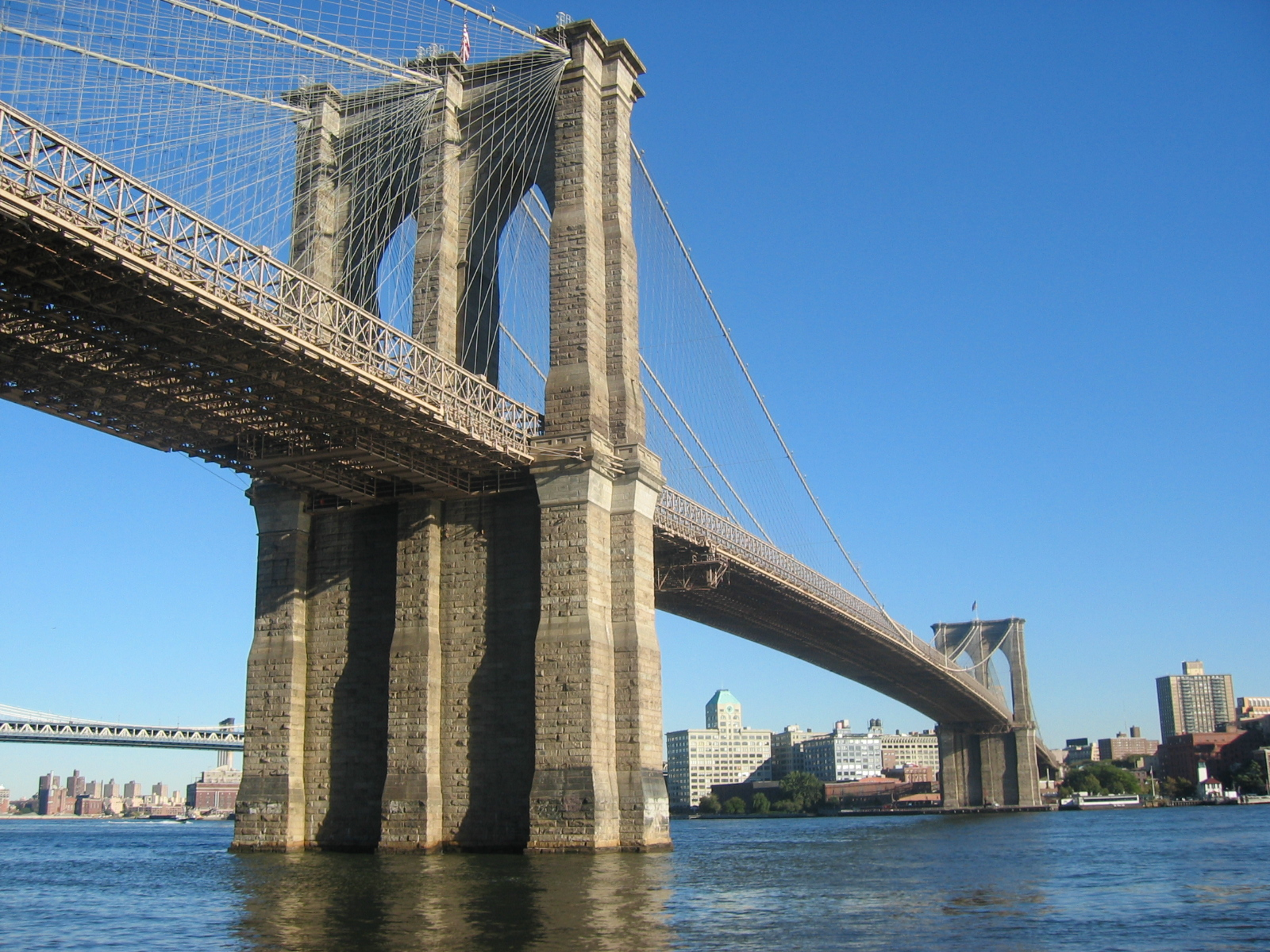
The Brooklyn Bridge, where a $5-million scene was filmed

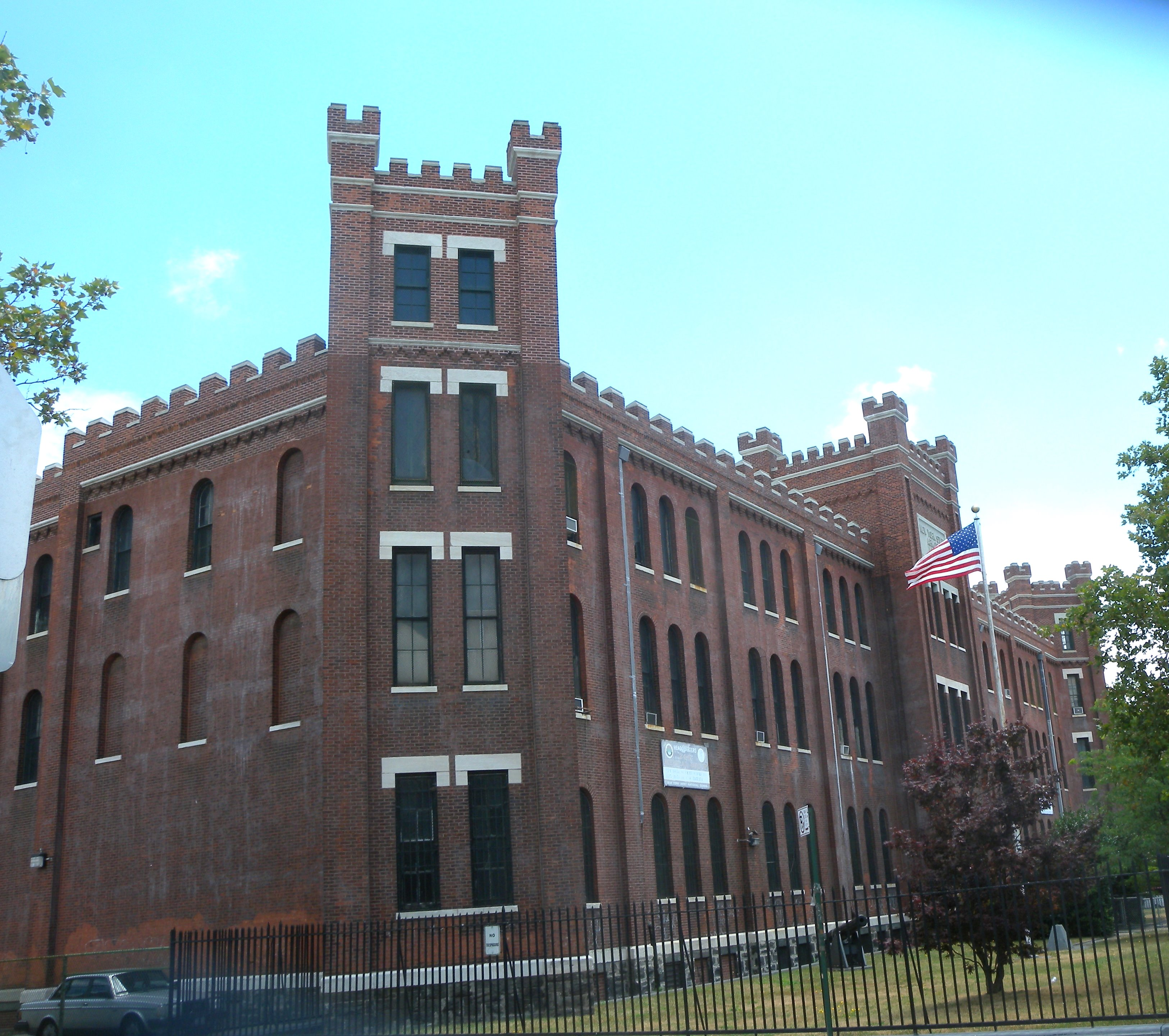
Marcy Avenue Armory

Akiva Goldsman decided to move the story from Los Angeles to New York City to take advantage of locations that would more easily show emptiness. Goldsman explained, "L.A. looks empty at three o'clock in the afternoon, [but] New York is never empty . . . it was a much more interesting way of showing the windswept emptiness of the world." Warner Bros. initially rejected this idea because of the logistics, but Francis Lawrence was determined to shoot on location, to give the film a natural feel that would benefit from not shooting on soundstages. Lawrence went to the city with a camcorder, and filmed areas filled with crowds. Then, a special effects test was conducted to remove all those people. The test had a powerful effect on studio executives. Michael Tadross convinced authorities to close busy areas such as the Grand Central Terminal viaduct, several blocks of Fifth Avenue, and Washington Square Park. The film was shot primarily in the anamorphic format, with flashback scenes shot in Super 35.

Filming began on September 23, 2006. The Marcy Avenue Armory in Williamsburg was used for the interior of Neville's home, while Greenwich Village was used for the exterior. Other locations include the Tribeca section of lower Manhattan, the aircraft carrier Intrepid, the Kingsbridge Armory in the Bronx, and St. Patrick's Cathedral. Weeds were imported from Florida and were strewn across locations to make the city look like it had been overgrown with them. The closure of major streets was controversial with New Yorkers. Will Smith said, "I don't think anyone's going to be able to do that in New York again anytime soon. People were not happy. That's the most middle fingers I've ever gotten in my career."

A scene was filmed for six consecutive nights in January on a pier south of the Brooklyn Bridge to serve as a flashback scene in which New York's citizens evacuate the city. Shooting the scene consumed $5 million of the film's reported $150 million budget, which was likely the most expensive shoot in the city to date. The scene, which had to meet requirements from 14 government agencies, involved 250 crew members and 1,000 extras, including 160 National Guard members. Also present were several Humvees, three Strykers, a 110-foot (34 m) cutter, a 41-foot (12 m) utility boat, and two 25-foot (7.6 m) response boat small craft, as well as other vehicles including taxis, police cars, fire trucks, and ambulances. Filming concluded on March 31, 2007. Computer-generated imagery (CGI) was used to depict the main spans of the Brooklyn Bridge and the Manhattan Bridge collapsing as missiles from passing military jets blew them up to quarantine Manhattan island.

The end of the film was shot in Lambertville, New Jersey.

Reshoots were conducted around November 2007. Lawrence noted, "We weren't seeing fully rendered shots until about a month ago. The movie starts to take on a whole other life. It's not until later that you can judge a movie as a whole and go, 'Huh, maybe we should shoot this little piece in the middle, or tweak this a little bit.' It just so happened that our reshoots revolved around the end of the movie."

=== Effects ===
A week into filming, Lawrence felt the infected (referred to as "Darkseekers" or "hemocytes" in the script), who were being portrayed by actors wearing prosthetics, were not convincing. His decision to use CGI resulted in an increased budget and extended post-production, although the end results were not always well received. The concept behind the infected was that their adrenal glands were open all of the time, and Lawrence explained:

"They needed to have an abandon in their performance that you just can't get out of people in the middle of the night when they're barefoot. And their metabolisms are really spiked, so they're constantly hyperventilating, which you can't really get actors to do for a long time or they pass out."

— Francis Lawrence

The actors remained on set to provide motion capture. "The film's producers and sound people wanted the creatures in the movie to sound somewhat human, but not the standard", so Mike Patton, lead singer of Faith No More, was engaged to provide the screams and howls of the infected.

In addition, CGI was used for the lions and deer in the film, and to erase pedestrians in shots of New York. Workers visible in windows, spectators, and moving cars in the distance were all removed. In his vision of an empty New York, Lawrence cited John Ford as his influence:

"We didn't want to make an apocalyptic movie where the landscape felt apocalyptic. A lot of the movie takes place on a beautiful day. There's something magical about the empty city as opposed to dark and scary that was the ideal that the cast and crew wanted."

— Francis Lawrence (2007)

== Music ==
The soundtrack for I Am Legend was released on January 15, 2008, under the record label Varèse Sarabande. The music was composed by James Newton Howard, conducted by Pete Anthony and performed by the Hollywood Studio Symphony. The film also features Bob Marley songs "Redemption Song", "Three Little Birds", "Buffalo Soldier" and "Stir It Up". Marley is also discussed in the film, and Neville's daughter is named after him.

== Release ==
=== Theatrical ===
I Am Legend was originally slated for a November 21, 2007, release in the United States and Canada, but was delayed to December 14. The film opened on December 26, 2007, in the United Kingdom, and Ireland, having been originally scheduled for January 4, 2008.

In December 2007, China temporarily suspended the release of all American films in the country, which is believed to have delayed the release of I Am Legend. Will Smith spoke to the chairman of China Film Group about securing a release date, later explaining, "We struggled very, very hard to try to get it to work out, but there are only a certain amount of foreign films that are allowed in."

Premieres were held in Tokyo, New York, and London. At the London premiere in Leicester Square, British comedian and actor Neg Dupree was arrested after pushing his way onto the red carpet and running around shouting "I am Negend!". The stunt was part of his "Neg's Urban Sports" section of comedy game show Balls of Steel.

=== Marketing ===
The film's teaser trailer was attached to the screenings of Harry Potter and the Order of the Phoenix. And a tie-in comic from DC Comics and Vertigo Comics was created, I Am Legend: Awakening. The project drew upon collaboration from Bill Sienkiewicz, screenwriter Mark Protosevich, and author Orson Scott Card. The son of the original book's author, Richard Christian Matheson, also collaborated on the project. The project advanced from the comic to an online format in which animated featurettes (created by the team from Broken Saints) were shown on the official website.

In October 2007, Warner Bros. Pictures, in conjunction with the Electric Sheep Company, launched the online multiplayer game I Am Legend: Survival in the virtual world Second Life. The game was the largest launched in the virtual world in support of a film release, permitting people to play against each other as the infected or the uninfected across a replicated 60 acres (240,000 m^{2}) of New York City. The studio also hired the ad agency Crew Creative to develop a website that was specifically viewable on the iPhone.

=== Home media ===
The film was released on DVD on March 18, 2008, by Warner Home Video, in two editions: a one-disc release, including the movie with four animated comics ("Death As a Gift", "Isolation", "Sacrificing the Few for the Many", and "Shelter"), and other DVD-ROM features, and a two-disc special edition that includes all these extras, an alternative theatrical version of the movie with an ending that follows closer to that from the novel, and a digital copy of the film. On the high-definition end, the movie has been released on the Blu-ray Disc format and HD DVD format along with the DVD release, with the HD-DVD version being released later on April 8, 2008. Both HD releases include all the features available in the two-disc DVD edition. A three-disk Ultimate Collector's Edition was also released on December 9, 2008. On December 6, 2016, the movie was released on Ultra HD Blu-ray as a combo-pack. This version featured the theatrical version in 4K, and a standard Blu-ray disc with both versions of the movie and all the previous extras. It also included a digital copy of the theatrical version in HD.

The film has sold 7.04 million DVDs and earned $126.2 million in revenue, making it the sixth-best-selling DVD of 2008. However, Warner Bros. was reportedly "a little disappointed" with the film's performance on the DVD market.

An alternative ending, which had been removed from the theatrical cut due to negative response from initial test screening audiences, was released on the two-disc special edition DVD of I Am Legend in 2008:

As the Darkseekers attack the lab; the alpha male creates a butterfly shape while trying to break through the glass. Neville recognizes it as a reference to the butterfly tattoo on the female Darkseeker's neck, realizing the alpha male and his followers just want to recover his mate. Neville puts down his gun, returns the female, and they stare each other down. Neville apologizes after seeing the alpha's emotional response. The alpha departs with his pack. Neville, shocked, looks at photos of his test subjects and feels he has become a monster, remorseful for his experiments. The next morning, Neville leaves his research with Anna and Ethan for Vermont to find the survivors' colony. They cross the George Washington Bridge as Anna concludes with: 'You are not alone.'

In February 2023, it was announced that the sequel to I Am Legend would disregard the theatrical ending and instead serve as a follow-up to the alternative ending, with Smith reprising his role as Neville as he resumes his experiments on the Darkseekers.

== Reception ==
=== Box office ===
I Am Legend collected $77.2 million during its opening weekend, ranking in first place at the box office above Alvin and the Chipmunks. It surpassed The Lord of the Rings: The Return of the King to have the highest December opening weekend. That record would be surpassed by The Hobbit: An Unexpected Journey five years later in 2012.

The film grossed $256 million domestically and $329 million internationally, increasing the total gross to $585.4 million.

=== Critical response ===
On Rotten Tomatoes, the film has an approval rating of 68% based on 213 reviews with an average rating of 6.34/10. The site's critical consensus reads, "I Am Legend overcomes questionable special effects and succeeds largely on the strength of Will Smith's mesmerizing performance." On Metacritic, the film has a weighted average score of 65 out of 100, based on 37 critics, indicating "generally favorable" reviews. Audiences polled by CinemaScore gave the film an average grade of "B" on an A+ to F scale.

A. O. Scott wrote that Will Smith gave a "graceful and effortless performance" and also noted the "third-act collapse". He felt that the movie "does ponder some pretty deep questions about the collapse and persistence of human civilization". Dana Stevens of Slate wrote that the movie lost its way around the hour mark, noting that "the Infected just aren't that scary." NPR critic Bob Mondello noted the film's subtext concerning global terrorism and that this aspect made the film fit in perfectly with other, more direct cinematic explorations of the subject. Richard Roeper gave the film a positive review on the television program At the Movies with Ebert & Roeper, commending Will Smith as being in "prime form", also saying there are "some amazing sequences" and that there was "a pretty heavy screenplay for an action film." In his review for the Chicago Sun-Times, Roger Ebert gave the film three stars out of four, writing, "Given its setup, I Am Legend is well-constructed to involve us with Dr. Neville and his campaign to survive." The film has been criticized for diverging from Matheson's novel, especially in its portrayal of a specifically Christian theme. Much of the negative criticism concerned the film's third act, with some critics favoring the alternative ending in the DVD release.

=== Other response ===
Popular Mechanics published an article on December 14, 2007, addressing some of the scientific issues raised by the film:

1. the rate of deterioration of urban structures, infrastructure, and survival of fauna and flora
2. the plausibility of a retrovirus spreading out of control as depicted in the film (the measles virus depicted in the film is not a retrovirus, but is in fact a part of the Paramyxovirus family)
3. the mechanics of the Brooklyn Bridge's destruction

The magazine solicited reactions from Alan Weisman, author of The World Without Us, virologist W. Ian Lipkin, MD, and Michel Bruneau, PhD, comparing their predictions with the film's depictions. The article raised the most questions regarding the virus' mutation and the medical results, and pointed out that a suspension bridge like the Brooklyn Bridge would likely completely collapse rather than losing only its middle span. Neville's method of producing power using gasoline-powered generators seemed the most credible: "This part of the tale is possible, if not entirely likely," Popular Mechanics editor Roy Berendsohn says.

Marxist philosopher Slavoj Žižek criticized the film politically for, in his view, "being the most regressive adaptation from the novel." He said that while the original novel had a "progressive multicultural message" where Neville became a "legend" to the new creatures and is subsequently killed by them (much like vampire were legends to humans), the 2007 film finds a cure for the Darkseekers and it is delivered by a survivor through "divine intervention". For Žižek, this misses the original message and "openly opt[s] for religious fundamentalism."

=== Accolades ===
I Am Legend earned four nominations for the Visual Effects Society awards, and was also nominated for Outstanding Performance by a Stunt Ensemble at the Screen Actors Guild Awards, Outstanding Film and Actor at the Image Awards, and Best Sound at the Satellite Awards. In June 2008, Will Smith won a Saturn Award for Best Actor. Will Smith also won the MTV Movie Awards for Best Male Performance.

== Future ==
Director Francis Lawrence said in 2008 that there would be a prequel and that Will Smith would be reprising his role. The plot of the film would reveal what happened to Neville before the infected took over New York. D. B. Weiss was hired to write the script, while Lawrence was in negotiations to return as director, contingent on a sufficiently interesting story. Smith later discussed the premise, which would have his character and a team going from New York City to Washington, D.C., as they made their last stand against those infected with the virus. The film would again explore the premise of being alone. Lawrence stated, "... the tough thing is, how do we do that again and in a different way?" In May 2011, Lawrence stated that the prequel was no longer in development saying, "I don't think that's ever going to happen."

In 2012, Warner Bros. announced that negotiations had begun to produce another installment with the intention of having Smith reprise his role. In April 2014, the studio acquired a script entitled A Garden at the End of the World, described as a post-apocalyptic variation of The Searchers. Studio executives found so many similarities to I Am Legend in the screenplay, they had the author Gary Graham rewrite it so it could serve as a reboot of the story, hoping to create a franchise with the new film. By 2014, Smith, who is known for his reluctance to appear in sequels, had not commented on whether he would appear.

On March 4, 2022, a sequel was officially announced as in development, with Will Smith reprising his role and Michael B. Jordan set to star, and both Will Smith and Michael B. Jordan will be producing. Akiva Goldsman would also return to write the script. The film will follow up on the alternative ending, rather than the theatrical.

On July 25, 2024, Goldsman announced that a second draft had been written. One day later, Steven Caple Jr. was reported to be in talks to direct the sequel. In April 2026, Caple Jr. was confirmed to direct.

== See also ==
- Survival film: information regarding the genre, including a list of its feature films
- Medical-fiction film
- Disaster film

== Bibliography ==
- I Am Legend, Richard Matheson, Tor Books, Reissue edition (October 30, 2007), ISBN 0765318741
