= Lisby Larson =

American actress

- Born: Elizabeth Susan Peek; October 23, 1951 (age 74); Washington, D.C.
- Occupation: Actress

Lisby Larson (née Peek; born 23 October 1951) is an American film, musical theatre, soap opera and television actress.

== Television ==
Her daytime roles include Texas (Paige Carrington, 1980–82), As the World Turns (Mary Hopkins Campbell, 1993), and Guiding Light (Calla Matthews, 1985–86). In 2006, she joined One Life to Live as Eve McBain; she had previously appeared on the soap in 2000 as Leigh Malone.

== Musical theatre ==
Larson made her Broadway debut in the short-lived 1981 revival of The Five O'Clock Girl. In 1997, she played Glinda in The Municipal Opera Association of St. Louis production of The Wizard of Oz, alongside Bob Keeshan as the Wizard of Oz, Natalie Delucia as Dorothy Gale, Lara Teeter as the Scarecrow, Ken Page as the Cowardly Lion, Johnny Sloman as the Tin Man and Marilyn Sokol as the Wicked Witch of the West.

== Family ==
In 1971 she married Arne Larry Larson. She was later married to actor Rex Hays, who died on September 8, 2006, from cancer; the union produced two sons, Connor and Matthew.
