= Killer Bees (1974 film) =

1974 American horror film

- Genre: Horror
- Written by: John William Corrington; Joyce Hooper Corrington
- Directed by: Curtis Harrington
- Starring: Gloria Swanson; Kate Jackson; Craig Stevens; Edward Albert; John Getz
- Theme music composer: David Shire
- Country of origin: United States
- Original language: English

Production
- Producers: Ron Bernstein; Howard Rosenman
- Production locations: Napa, Napa Valley, California
- Cinematography: Jack Woolf
- Editors: Robert A. Daniels; John W. Holmes
- Running time: 74 minutes
- Production company: Robert Stigwood Organization

Original release
- Network: ABC
- Release: February 26, 1974

Killer Bees is a 1974 American made-for-television horror film starring Gloria Swanson. Directed by Curtis Harrington, the cast includes Kate Jackson, Craig Stevens, John Getz, and Edward Albert. The film originally aired as the ABC Movie of the Week on February 26, 1974.

== Plot ==
Edward Van Bohlen is estranged from his family and their winemaking business. His new girlfriend, Victoria Wells, has convinced him to return to the family at their winery near San Francisco to reconcile despite Edward's warning that his family is eccentric and reclusive. Victoria is treated coolly by the family, but she nevertheless becomes involved in the family power struggle.

Victoria discovers that the family has been using the Africanized bee strain to improve yields at the winery.

Maria Van Bohlen, a strong-willed woman and matriarch of her family, runs the family wine business. Her family refers to her as "Madame." She also has a psychic link that allows her control over the swarm of killer bees that reside in her vineyard. Van Bohlen serves as the queen of the hive.

Victoria discovers that Van Bohlen is using this power to kill people she perceives as threats, but the family appears to refuse to accept this.

Van Bohlen dies under mysterious circumstances, and although law enforcement officers are highly suspicious, they are unable to obtain a search warrant to investigate further and close the case. Victoria and Edward plan to leave the family and return to their life as soon as the funeral is over.

During the Van Bohlen funeral, the bees attack the church. Victoria is cut off and shepherded by the bees into the attic housing their main hives; however, they do not attack Victoria.

Rather than leave, Victoria returns to the winery, now accepted as queen both by the family (who now calls her "Madame") and by the swarm.

== Cast ==
- Gloria Swanson as Madame Van Bohlen
- Kate Jackson as Victoria Wells
- Edward Albert as Edward Van Bohlen
- John Getz as Attendant
- Craig Stevens as Rudolf Van Bohlen
- Don McGovern as Mathias Van Bohlen
- Roger Davis as Dr. Helmut Van Bohlen
- John S. Ragin as Sergeant Jeffreys
- Liam Dunn as Zeb Tucker
- Heather Ann Bostain as Roseanna / Housekeeper
- Donald Gentry as Lineman
- Jack Perkins as Salesman
- Robert L. Balzer as Minister
- Daniel Woodwort as Townsman
- George Deangelis as Foster

== Reception ==
Moria found the effects disappointing and the plot dull, complaining that much of the movie keeps the bees offscreen, focusing on the family drama instead. Nevertheless, it did find the twist ending intriguing. The New York Times found the movie a tedious bore, opining that the commercials advertising the movie were more interesting that the film itself.

SF Weekly was kinder to the film. While it found most of the effects laughable, it deemed the scenes where Jackson and Swanson allowed real bees to crawl on them genuinely creepy. It granted that the film avoided many of the clichés that other killer bee movies contained, but pointed out that many questions (such as how the link with the bees came to be) remain unanswered. The musical score by David Shire was also singled out for praise.

== Home release ==
Available, as of July 2021, to stream on many services, including YouTube, but not on Hulu.

== Awards ==
| Year | Award | Result | Category | Recipient |
|---|---|---|---|---|
| 1975 | Saturn Award | Won | Special Achievement in Television | Curtis Harrington |

== See also ==
- List of American films of 1974
- Africanized bee
- List of Killer bee Films
- Die Bienen – Tödliche Bedrohung (a 2008 Killer Bee movie)
