= I Am Legend (novel) =

1954 novel by Richard Matheson

- First edition cover
- Author: Richard Matheson
- Language: English
- Subject: Post-apocalyptic
- Genre: Horror
- Publisher: Gold Medal Books
- Publication date: August 7, 1954
- Publication place: United States
- Media type: Paperback
- Pages: 160 (1954 edition)
- ISBN: 9780802755247
- Dewey Decimal: 813.54
- LC Class: PS3563.A8355

I Am Legend is a 1954 post-apocalyptic horror novel by American writer Richard Matheson. The novel inspired the modern development of zombie and vampire literature as a new genre, the narrative trope of a scientific explanation for vampires, and the popularity of a worldwide apocalypse due to disease. The novel was a success and was adapted into the films The Last Man on Earth (1964), The Omega Man (1971), and I Am Legend (2007). It was also an inspiration for George A. Romero's Night of the Living Dead (1968).

== Plot ==
Set after an apocalyptic war that ravages the land with weekly dust storms, the novel details the life of Robert Neville, who lives on Cimarron Street in Los Angeles in the months and eventually years after the outbreak of a pandemic. The plague, whose spread was facilitated by the dust storms, killed most of the human population and turned them into undead "vampires". The vampires conform remarkably to their stereotypes in fiction and folklore: they are blood-sucking, pale-skinned, and nocturnal, though otherwise indistinguishable from normal humans. Neville, possibly the sole survivor of the pandemic, barricades himself indoors nightly as vampires violently swarm his house. He is further protected by the traditional vampire repellents of garlic, mirrors, and crucifixes. During the day, the vampires are inactive, allowing Neville to drive around stabbing them with wooden stakes, since they seem impervious to his gun's bullets, and scavenging for supplies. Impalement causes the vampires to liquefy instantly. Occasional flashbacks reveal the horrors of how the disease claimed the lives of his wife and daughter.

Suffering from extreme isolation, depression, and alcoholism, Neville determines there must be some scientific reasons behind the vampires' origins, behaviors, and oddly specific aversions, so he gradually researches at the Los Angeles Public Library, discovering that the root of the disease is probably a bacillus strain of bacteria capable of infecting both living and deceased ("undead") hosts. His experiments with microscopes also reveal that the bacteria are deadly sensitive to garlic and sunlight. After he painstakingly attempts to win the trust of a stray sickly dog that dies after only a week, Neville, heartbroken, commits himself even more vigorously to his studies.

Soon he experiments directly on incapacitated vampires, which leads to a new theory that vampires are affected by mirrors and crosses because of "hysterical blindness". According to his theory, widespread sensationalist media towards the end of the plague caused a general rise in the fear of supernatural monsters like vampires, resulting in the infected now delusionally reacting as they believe vampires should, including when confronted with mirrors and crosses. Neville additionally discovers that exposing the vampires to direct sunlight or inflicting wide oxygen-exposing wounds causes the bacteria to switch from being anaerobic symbionts to aerobic parasites, rapidly consuming their hosts when exposed to air and thus giving them the appearance of instantly liquefying. However, he discovers the bacteria also produce resilient "body glue" that instantaneously seals blunt or narrow wounds, explaining how the vampires are bulletproof. Lastly, he deduces now that there are in fact two differently reacting types of vampires — conscious ones who are living with a worsening infection and undead ones who have died but been partly reanimated by the bacteria and have lost their rational abilities.

After three years, Neville suddenly sees a terrified woman named Ruth in broad daylight. The two cautiously gain each other's trust and share a romantic embrace. Neville explains some of his findings, including his theory that he developed immunity against the infection after being bitten by an infected vampire bat years prior. He prepares to test Ruth to determine if she is infected or immune, vowing to treat her if she is infected, but she knocks him unconscious. Once Neville comes to, he discovers a note from her confessing that she is, indeed, a vampire. Her note suggests that only the undead vampires are pathologically violent, but not those, like her, who were alive at the time of infection and who still survive due to chance mutations. These living-infected have slowly overcome their disease and are gradually developing a new society and new medications. Ruth admits she was sent to spy on him by her comrades and that he was responsible for the deaths of many of her fellow vampires, including her husband. Still, Ruth reiterates her romantic feelings for Neville and urges him to flee the city to avoid capture.

Neville ignores Ruth's warning, assuming he will be treated fairly by the new society of living-infected. However, his mind is changed when he watches a group of them annihilate the undead vampires outside his home with fiendish glee, then break down his front door. In a panic, Neville opens fire on them, but is in turn shot and subdued. Imprisoned and dying, he is visited by Ruth, who informs him that she is a senior member of the new society, but unlike the others who perceive him as a murderer, she does not resent him. She acknowledges the public need for Neville's execution, but out of mercy gives him a packet of fast-acting suicide pills. Neville accepts his fate and asks Ruth not to let this society become too heartless. Ruth promises to try, kisses him, and leaves. Neville goes to his prison window and sees the infected staring back at him with the same hatred and fear that he once felt for them. He realizes that he, a remnant of old humanity, is now a legend to the new race born of the infection. He acknowledges that their desire to kill him, after he has killed so many of their loved ones, is not something he can condemn. As the pills take effect, he is amused by the role reversal of society, and how he has spent the last years of his life hunting what he considers to be "monsters", and how they did the same to him with an equal viewpoint. As he lies dying, Neville comments how being the last human has reduced him to an urban myth, stating, "I am legend."

== Critical reception ==
The book initially received mixed reviews. As related in In Search of Wonder (1956), Damon Knight wrote:

The book is full of good ideas, every other one of which is immediately dropped and kicked out of sight. The characters are child's drawings, as blank-eyed and expressionless as the author himself in his back-cover photograph. The plot limps. All the same, the story could have been an admirable minor work in the tradition of Dracula, if only the author, or somebody, had not insisted on encumbering it with the year's most childish set of "scientific" rationalizations.

— Damon Knight

Galaxy reviewer Groff Conklin described Legend as:

a weird [and] rather slow-moving first novel ... a horrid, violent, sometimes exciting but too often overdone tour de force.

— Groff Conklin

Anthony Boucher praised the novel:

Matheson has added a new variant on the Last Man theme ... and has given striking vigor to his invention by a forceful style of storytelling which derives from the best hard-boiled crime novels.

— Anthony Boucher

Modern reviews have been more positive, with the novel becoming heavily influential to the genre. Dan Schneider from International Writers Magazine: Book Review wrote:

Despite having vampires in it, [the novel] is not a novel on vampires, nor even a horror nor sci-fi novel at all, in the deepest sense. Instead, it is perhaps the greatest novel written on human loneliness. It far surpasses Daniel Defoe's Robinson Crusoe in that regard. Its insights into what it is to be human go far beyond genre, and is all the more surprising because, having read his short stories—which range from competent but simplistic, to having classic Twilight Zone twists (he was a major contributor to the original TV series)—there is nothing within those short stories that suggests the supreme majesty of the existential masterpiece I Am Legend was aborning.

— Dan Schneider (2005)

In 2012, the Horror Writers Association gave I Am Legend the special Vampire Novel of the Century Award.

== Influence ==
One major influence upon Matheson and others of the genre is the Mary Shelley novel, The Last Man, about an immune person surviving in a plague-infested world.

In I Am Legend, the vampires share many similarities with zombies, and the novel influenced the zombie genre that, in turn, later popularized the concept of a worldwide zombie apocalypse.

Although the idea has now become commonplace, a scientific origin for vampirism or zombies was fairly original when written.

According to Clasen:

I Am Legend is the product of an anxious artistic mind working in an anxious cultural climate. However, it is also a playful take on an old archetype, the vampire (the reader is even treated to Neville's reading and put-down of Bram Stoker's Dracula). Matheson goes to great lengths to rationalize or naturalize the vampire myth, transplanting the monster from the otherworldly realms of folklore and Victorian supernaturalism to the test tube of medical inquiry and rational causation. With I Am Legend, Matheson instituted the germ theory of vampirism, a take on the old archetype which has since been tackled by other writers (notably, Dan Simmons in Children of the Night from 1992).

— Mathias Clasen

Although called "the first modern vampire novel", it is as a novel of social theme that I Am Legend made a lasting impression on the cinematic zombie genre, by way of director George A. Romero, who acknowledged its influence and that of its original cinematic adaptation, The Last Man on Earth (1964), upon his seminal film Night of the Living Dead (1968).

Discussing the creation of Night of the Living Dead, Romero remarked:

I had written a short story, which I basically had ripped off from a Richard Matheson novel called I Am Legend.

— George Romero

Moreover, film critics have noted similarities between Night of the Living Dead (1968) and The Last Man on Earth (1964).

Stephen King said: "Books like I Am Legend were an inspiration to me." Film critics noted that the British film 28 Days Later (2002) and its sequel 28 Weeks Later both feature a rabies-type plague ravaging Great Britain, analogous to I Am Legend.

Tim Cain, the producer, lead programmer and one of the main designers of the 1997 computer game Fallout, cited I Am Legend and the movie The Omega Man as influences on the game:

This book was how a[n] individual would handle thinking that he was the last survivor on Earth. This is why in Fallout 1 when you're voted to leave the Vault, we really wanted that sense of isolationism; that sense of: you are the only person out here on the Wasteland who is, quote, "a normal person", and we wanted you to feel, like, special in that way.

== Adaptations ==
=== Comics ===
The book has also been adapted into a comic book miniseries titled Richard Matheson's I Am Legend by Steve Niles and Elman Brown. It was published in 1991 by Eclipse Comics and collected into a trade paperback by IDW Publishing.

An unrelated film tie-in was released in 2007 as a one-shot I Am Legend: Awakening published in a San Diego Comic-Con special by Vertigo.

=== Audiobook ===
A nine-part abridged reading of the novel performed by Angus MacInnes was originally broadcast on BBC 7 in January 2006 and repeated in January 2018.

=== Films ===
I Am Legend has been adapted into a feature-length film three times, as well as into a direct-to-video feature film called I Am Omega. Differing from the book, each of them portrays the Neville character as an accomplished scientist. The three adaptations show him finding a remedy and passing it on. Adaptations differ from the novel by setting the events three years after the disaster, instead of happening "in the span of" three years. Also, adaptations are set in the near future, a few years after the film's release, while the novel is set 20 years after its publication date.

Soy leyenda is a short film by Mario Gómez Martín in 1967 intended as a student film for the Spanish Escuela Oficial de Cinematografía. It has been described as the version most pessimist and faithful to the original novel.

==== The Last Man on Earth ====
The Last Man on Earth (full movie)

In 1964, Vincent Price starred as Dr. Robert Morgan (rather than "Neville") in The Last Man on Earth (the original title of this Italian production was L'ultimo uomo della Terra). Matheson wrote the original screenplay for this adaptation, but due to later rewrites did not wish his name to appear in the credits; as a result, Matheson is credited under the pseudonym "Logan Swanson".

==== The Omega Man ====
In 1971, a far different version was produced, titled The Omega Man. It starred Charlton Heston (as Robert Neville) and Anthony Zerbe. Matheson had no influence on the screenplay for this film, and although the premise remains, it deviates from the novel in several ways, removing the infected people's vampiric characteristics, except their sensitivity to light. In this version, the infected are portrayed as nocturnal, black-robed, albino mutants, known as the Family. Though intelligent, they eschew modern technology, believing it (and those who use it, such as Neville) to be evil and the cause of humanity's downfall.

==== I Am Legend ====
In 2007, a third adaptation of the novel was produced, this time titled I Am Legend. Directed by Francis Lawrence and starring Will Smith as Robert Neville, this film uses both Matheson's novel and the 1971 Omega Man film as its sources. This adaptation also deviates significantly from the novel. In this version, the infection is caused by a vaccine originally intended to cure cancer. Some vampiric elements are retained, such as sensitivity to UV light and attraction to blood. The infected are portrayed as nocturnal, feral creatures of limited intelligence who hunt the uninfected with berserker-like rage. Other creatures, such as dogs, are also infected by the virus. The ending of the film was also altered to portray Neville as sacrificing his life to save humanity, rather than being executed for crimes against the surviving vampiric humans, although a deleted ending for the film was closer in spirit to the book. The film takes place in New York City in 2009 and 2012 rather than Los Angeles in 1975–1979.

== See also ==
- 1954 in science fiction
- Apocalyptic and post-apocalyptic fiction
- Survivalism
- Vampire literature
- Zombie
