= Texas (TV series) =

American daytime soap opera

- Genre: Soap opera Drama
- Created by: John William Corrington; Joyce Hooper Corrington; Paul Rauch
- Written by: Pamela K. Long (head writer, 1981-1982)
- Starring: Beverlee McKinsey; Bert Kramer; Daniel Davis; Carla Borelli
- Composers: Score Productions (1980-1981); Elliot Lawrence Productions (1981-1982)
- Country of origin: United States
- Original language: English
- No. of seasons: 2
- No. of episodes: 617

Production
- Executive producers: Paul Rauch (1980-1981); Gail Kobe (1981-1982)
- Producer: Judy Lewis
- Camera setup: Single-camera
- Running time: 48 minutes
- Production company: Procter & Gamble Productions

Original release
- Network: NBC
- Release: August 4, 1980 – December 31, 1982

Related
- Another World

Texas is an American daytime soap opera that aired on NBC from August 4, 1980, until December 31, 1982, sponsored and produced by Procter and Gamble Productions at NBC Studios in Brooklyn, New York City. It is a spin-off of Another World, co-created by head writers John William Corrington and Joyce Hooper Corrington, and executive producer of Another World at the time, Paul Rauch. Rauch held the title of executive producer for the parent series and its spin-off until 1981.

== Overview ==
=== Initial development and debut ===
The Corringtons' initial concept was for a show set in the antebellum South entitled Reunion, but NBC wanted something more in line with the hugely successful CBS primetime soap Dallas, which was dominating the ratings. Rauch then chose to have the show revolve around the popular Another World character Iris Cory Carrington, played by Beverlee McKinsey. Iris initially set out to visit her grown son Dennis (Jim Poyner), who had relocated from Bay City to Houston. Within a matter of weeks, Iris reconnected and became romantically involved with her first love, Alex Wheeler (Bert Kramer).

A slew of characters debuted on Another World in the months prior to August 1980, in the hope that when they eventually moved over to Texas, they would have made enough impact with viewers so they would watch Texas, too.

The debut episode featured Iris on a plane, leaving Houston after visiting her son Dennis, who had relocated to Texas with his new love to open an art gallery. During her visit, she reconnected with her first love, self-made millionaire Alex Wheeler. Alex is determined not to let the past repeat itself and lose her again. He arranges for the Bay City-bound jet airliner, which Iris is on, to return to Houston.

During the first season of the series, the stories centered around the daily lives of the wealthy Wheelers and Bellmans and the middle-class Marshalls, and their ranching and oil interests.

=== The 1981 revamp ===
In November 1981, McKinsey left the show, and the secondary characters seen in the first year were given more story. Texas lost one million viewers upon McKinsey's departure. While Another World, which also lost a million viewers upon her 1980 departure, could afford the drop in ratings, Texas could not, and its days were numbered. To try to appeal to the younger audience, the show rechristened itself Texas: The New Generation.

In the daytime ratings for 1980-1981 season, Texas achieved a 3.8, tied with The Doctors at the 12th position. Its time slot contenders Guiding Light had an 8.2 rating, fourth position in the ratings, as opposed to an 11.4 rating for General Hospital, which was the top-rated serial for the 1980-1981 season. In its second season, the series fell to a 3.6 rating. At the end of its broadcast season, it ended with a 2.7 rating, in the 12th position out of 14 daytime serials. According to A.C. Neilsen, the total viewers for the first two seasons was at 2.8 million, followed by a drop to 2.2 million in the final season.

Simultaneously, Texas aired on CTV in Canada at the 3:00 pm ET slot following Another World, which had also aired on CTV since the early 1970s. The series was immensely popular in Canada, topping the BBM daytime ratings charts for many weeks. Beverlee McKinsey vacationed often in Nova Scotia during her tenure on both shows, according to numerous soap-opera sources. After NBC moved Texas to 11:00 am in April 1982, CTV opted not to follow suit, and continued airing Texas at its original timeslot of 3:00 pm (ET). In addition, Canadian viewers who either lived near the border and had access to NBC terrestrial affiliates or a cable TV subscription had the option of viewing the series mornings or afternoons, respectively.

=== Hitopah ===
A popular storyline at the end of 1981 called Hitopah involved numerous characters in adventurous settings and intriguing circumstances to locate Sutars Rock, which nonetheless offered comic relief provided by good friends Ruby and Lurleen. Hitopah was about an ancient Indian artifact called the Fire Compass that was covered with runes and which Ruby's boyfriend Beau Baker opened. The opening of the Fire Compass released a toxic gas that turned Beau instantly into a mummy. Then, following some comedic hijinks with Lurleen and Ruby attempting to get rid of the body and make sense of the situation, Gretchen tried to get part of the Fire Compass back from them, leading to a chase to find the secret underground chambers in Hitopah (which contain a huge quantity of petroleum), towards which the Fire Compass is supposed to guide the owner.

=== Special guests ===
Musical artists were featured on Texas to focus and contribute to some of the characters' storyline, such as siblings Elena and Rikki Dekker both venturing into the musical careers, although short-lived. Almost all serials in the 1980s had notable musical artists appearing on their respective shows, with some of the characters playing rising musical artists, and Texas was no exception, The character of Rikki Dekker (played by Randy Hamilton) gave his rendition of Luther Ingram's R&B hit, "(If Loving You Is Wrong) I Don't Want to Be Right", and notable country music singers of the 1970s and 1980s such as Johnny Paycheck, Tom T. Hall, and Ray Stevens all made appearances as themselves at venues, mostly at the Coop, on the series.

In addition, politicians also made appearances, such as Oklahoma Governor George Nigh and his wife Donna. They appeared in walk-on roles (playing themselves as governor and first lady of Oklahoma) during the show's first month on the air; cast member Lisby Larson (Paige Marshall) serenaded the couple with a rendition of "Oklahoma!". Also, while he never appeared on the actual series, Texas Lieutenant Governor William P. Hobby, Jr., took a tour of the program's Brooklyn studio, and praised the show's realistic visual feel.

=== Final episodes ===
The last episodes featured a Christmas miracle (snow fell in Houston as Long's character Ashley and her unborn baby, who had been presumed dead after a flash flood, returned home to loving husband Justin) and a New Year's series finale where the local TV station was bought out and all the major characters were fired. The final scene was a bittersweet, final toast, "To Texas!". (They weren't the only ones out of work: The Doctors also aired its last episode on this day, ending a nearly-twenty year run.)

NBC replaced Texas with the game shows Wheel of Fortune and Hit Man (the latter of which was cancelled after 13 weeks despite an increase in the network's ratings in the 11:30 am timeslot), as well as reruns of 1970s primetime shows.

== Cast and characters ==
=== Entire run ===
Actor/Actress	Character
Carla Borelli	Reena Bellman Cook Dekker
Elizabeth Allen	Victoria Bellman
Josephine Nichols	Kate Marshall
Jerry Lanning	Justin Marshall
Lisby Larson	Paige Marshall Carrington
John McCafferty	Billy Joe Wright
Barbara Rucker	Ginny Hampton Marshall Connor
Caryn Richman	Elena Dekker
Randy Hamilton	Rikki Dekker

=== Partial run ===
Actor/Actress	Duration	Character
Beverlee McKinsey	1980–1981	Iris Cory Wheeler
Jim Poyner	1980–1981	Dennis Carrington
Bert Kramer	1980–1981	Alex Wheeler
Gretchen Oehler	1981–1982	Vivien Gorrow
Lee Patterson	1980–1981	Dr. Kevin Cook
Robert Gerringer, Clifton James	1980–1982	Striker Bellman
Stephen D. Newman	1980–1981	Barrett Marshall
Donald May	1981–1982	Grant Wheeler
Pam Long	1981–1982	Ashley Linden Marshall
David Forsyth	1981–1982	T.J Canfield
Harley Jane Kozak	1981–1982	Brette Wheeler
Shanna Reed	1980–1981	Terri Dekker
Kin Shriner	1980–1981	Jeb Hampton
Benjamin Hendrickson	1981	Chris Shaw
Christopher Goutman	1982	George St. John
Stephen Joyce	1981–1982	Bubba Wadsworth
Tina Johnson	1981–1982	Lurleen Harper Walker
Alexandra Neil	1981–1982	Ruby Wright Wheeler
Virginia Graham	1982	Stella Stanton
Elizabeth Berridge, Terri Garber	1981–1982	Allison Linden
Daniel Davis	1980–1982	Eliot Carrington
Dody Goodman	1982	Mavis Cobb
Catherine Hickland	1980–1981	Dr. Courtney Marshall
Chandler Hill Harben, Jay Hammer	1980–1981	Max Dekker
James Rebhorn	1981–1982	John Brady
Dana Kimmell	1980	Dawn Marshall
Sharon Acker	1982	Judith Wheeler

== Broadcast history ==
In the run-up to the premiere of Texas in the summer of 1980, a handful of characters was introduced on Another World, in the hope that once Texas began airing on August 4, 1980, the viewers who had become invested would continue watching as Iris Bancroft and these newer characters moved to Texas. The premiere of Texas came at a time when NBC's daytime lineup (consisting of Another World, Days of Our Lives, and The Doctors) had fallen into ratings trouble, after a highly successful period in the early and mid-1970s. Its parent series had even tried expanding to ninety minutes daily in 1979, but the move resulted in a downturn in ratings.

In order to create the sixty minutes on the schedule needed for Texas, Another World and The David Letterman Show, which aired in the morning, each were cut thirty minutes. Texas was then slotted at 3:00 PM Eastern, with Another World preceding it at 2:00; this move resulted in the long running soap The Doctors, which had been previously airing at 2:00 PM, being relocated to 12:30 PM.

Due in no small part to the then-peak success of ABC's General Hospital, Texas remained in the bottom echelon of the daytime serial chart with a 3.8 rating, tying with The Doctors for last place, 12th, in 1980. However, the show's numbers fell gradually after its first year. The struggles of Texas also affected the ratings of its mother show, Another World, in such a way that the latter show was no longer NBC's highest-rated soap. The 1980-1981 season had Another World finish with a 5.1 ratings by comparison to a 7.1 during the previous season (1979-1980). In that same season, Days of our Lives became the highest-rated serial on NBC.

The show had a very difficult task from the beginning in the ratings for NBC; its 3:00 pm timeslot competitors were ABC's General Hospital, then the highest-rated daytime soap opera due in large part to the popularity of the Luke and Laura storyline, and CBS' Guiding Light, which had undergone a ratings resurgence due to popular, more youth-oriented stories and characters created by headwriter Douglas Marland. At that time, NBC was third in the ratings. The serial finished with a 3.8 in the ratings for its first year.

Critics complained that Iris Bancroft (who was known on Another World as being a villainess) had become too tame in her new environment in Houston, and that other roles were poorly cast or suffered from paper-thin writing. In early 1981, the Corringtons were replaced as head writers. Other casting moves were made with little gain, such as hiring away well established and popular General Hospital star Kin Shriner (Scotty Baldwin) in October 1980, at great expense, to be cast as Jeb Hampton, only to give him almost nothing to do except as a supporting role until he finally departed the series in August 1981.

In addition to popular Shriner, veteran actor Jay Hammer, who had a notable credit role as Allan Willis during the 1978–1979 season on the primetime CBS sitcom The Jeffersons, replaced Chandler Hill Harben in February 1981 as Max Dekker. The character was paired off with Carla Borelli's character, Reena Bellman Cook. They both brought charisma to the roles, but their storyline was short-lived, as Hammer's contract ended, and Max was killed off in a fatal explosion.

=== Gail Kobe and Pam Long ===
In late 1981, Gail Kobe became executive producer and Pam Long (who appeared on the show as Ashley Linden Marshall) became head writer. The show began to improve in quality, but the ratings remained in the basement due to numerous factors such as losing affiliates due to timeslot rescheduling, contributing to the show's cancellation.

After the show ended, Kobe and Long were hired at Guiding Light in the same roles. Several Texas actors appeared shortly after Long began writing the show; Jay Hammer, James Rebhorn, Harley Jane Kozak, and Michael Woods were all cast in new roles on Guiding Light. Long and Kobe also wooed Beverlee McKinsey back to daytime to portray Baroness Alexandra Spaulding Von Halkein, a role she played until 1992.

Other Texas actors who appeared on Guiding Light after Texas ended included Alexandra Neil, Lisby Larson, and Jerry Lanning. Long had originally wanted Lanning for the role of Billy Lewis; Lanning eventually took on the role of Cain Harris, who befriended and then stalked the character of Reva Shayne.

=== 1982 ===
On April 26, 1982, Texas moved to the 11:00 am timeslot. The serial had been at a critical low point in the ratings, and NBC, as part of a reshuffling of its morning lineup and a last-ditch effort to save the show, opted for this late-morning move, which also resulted in a change of timeslot for the hit game show Wheel of Fortune. As part of this shuffle, NBC moved Wheel of Fortune from 11:00 to 10:30, which subsequently resulted in the termination of Blockbusters and Battlestars.

This move, though, may have exacerbated the ratings problems for Texas; although it no longer had to face General Hospital, it was now directly against CBS' hit game show The Price Is Right. While Wheel of Fortune had given The Price Is Right some competition in the slot, Texas was unable to make even the slightest dent against the long-running CBS game. Therefore, NBC cancelled Texas and the still-struggling The Doctors (which had been bumped up to noon to make room for NBC acquiring CBS' Search for Tomorrow at 12:30) on December 31, 1982. (Many cancelled serials broadcast their final episode on the last day of the year)

After initially filling the slot with reruns of CHiPs for a few months, NBC experimented with other programming in the 3:00 timeslot; two 60-minute game shows occupied the slot over a period of nearly two years. The first of these, Fantasy, ran for thirteen months and was replaced by The Match Game-Hollywood Squares Hour. When the latter ended its run in July 1984, Santa Barbara premiered in the 3:00 timeslot, now airing after Another World giving NBC a soap airing at 3pm again. Santa Barbara aired for nine years; archiving better ratings and critical acclaim than Texas ever did only airing for a little over two years on NBC. Santa Barbara was also the last soap NBC would air in the 3:00pm timeslot. NBC returned the hour to its affiliates after the show ended in 1993.

Shortly after the cancellation of Texas and The Doctors, NBC turned its focus back to game shows and improving the struggling but still higher-rated soaps Days of Our Lives and Another World in early 1983. The daytime block led off with the Jim Perry-helmed revival of Sale of the Century at 10:30 am in January 1983. The 11:00 slot went back to Wheel of Fortune, which Texas had displaced with its move to the mornings, and the 11:30 slot was filled by Hit Man, which introduced audiences to Peter Tomarken. The noon slot, which The Doctors previously occupied, was taken by Just Men!, hosted by Betty White. Of the shows that premiered that day, Sale of the Century lasted until March 1989, but Hit Man and Just Men! each lasted only 13 weeks.

=== Beverlee McKinsey ===
Texas was used as a starring vehicle for Daytime Emmy-nominated Beverlee McKinsey, whose Another World character of Iris Carrington, penned in 1972 by Harding Lemay on the mother show as the rich, spoiled daughter of publishing magnate Mackenzie Cory, was made the focal point of the series. The series was retooled from its initial conception to focus on McKinsey's character as its leading lady.

McKinsey was given the distinction of having a starring credit on the opening of the show. Narrator Ken Roberts announced at the end of the theme song, "Texas, starring Beverlee McKinsey," and a still image of McKinsey was shown. However, she left Texas 16 months after its debut.

Texas was also the first daytime soap opera to air hour-long episodes from its inception, as all the other hour-long soaps airing at the time had expanded from 30 minutes. Noteworthy, the multiple Emmy Award-winning Santa Barbara, which took over the former Texas time slot in 1984, also premiered with hour-long episodes. Santa Barbara managed to achieve more critical acclaim and slightly higher ratings during its 8 1/2-year run.

== Repeats ==
Soon after Texas was cancelled, TBS began airing the show in a weekday morning timeslot in a 30-minute format. These airings were paired with a new half-hour soap, The Catlins, which was one of the few made-for-cable soaps.

In 2006, Procter and Gamble began making several of its soaps available, a few episodes at a time, through America Online's AOL Video service, downloadable free of charge. Reruns of Texas episodes began with the show's first episode from August 4, 1980.

As of January 1, 2009, Procter and Gamble announced that Texas and three other of its cancelled soap operas would no longer be streamed on AOL Video. The notice referred to exploring other options to make the shows available for viewing. The last Texas episode made available through AOL Video was #339, which originally aired on December 4, 1981. Additionally, numerous clips of the show are available on the video-sharing site YouTube.

Five episodes are known to be missing so far:

- Episode #47 dated October 7, 1980, posted at AOL is the same as episode #24 and it seems to be either missing or was somehow mislabeled.
- Episode #203 dated May 21, 1981
- Episode #245 dated July 21, 1981
- Episode #247 dated July 23, 1981
- Episode #288 dated September 18, 1981

Episodes 78–163 were once available at AOL, but removed sometime in spring 2008. Although episodes 1–77 are still available through the WMV stream URLs, AOL has completely removed the embedded player pages at the website.
