= Boxcar Bertha =

1972 film directed by Martin Scorsese

- Theatrical release poster
- Directed by: Martin Scorsese
- Screenplay by: Joyce H. Corrington; John William Corrington
- Based on: Sister of the Road; 1937 story by Ben L. Reitman
- Produced by: Roger Corman
- Starring: Barbara Hershey; David Carradine; Barry Primus; Bernie Casey; John Carradine
- Cinematography: John Stephens
- Edited by: Buzz Feitshans
- Music by: Gib Guilbeau; Thad Maxwell
- Production company: American International Pictures
- Distributed by: American International Pictures
- Release date: June 14, 1972
- Running time: 89 minutes
- Country: United States
- Language: English
- Budget: $600,000
- Box office: $1.1 million

Boxcar Bertha is a 1972 American romantic crime drama film directed by Martin Scorsese and produced by Roger Corman, from a screenplay by Joyce H. Corrington and John William Corrington. Made on a low budget, the film is a loose adaptation of Sister of the Road, a pseudo-autobiographical account of the fictional character Bertha Thompson. It was Scorsese's second feature film.

== Plot ==
Boxcar Bertha Thompson, a poor southern girl, is orphaned when her father's crop-dusting airplane crashes. The Great Depression hits, and she soon takes to freighthopping. A few years later, she meets Big Bill Shelly, a union organizer, and they become lovers. Together with Rake Brown, a gambler, and Von Morton, who worked for Bertha's father, they accidentally start train and bank robberies. Eventually, they face off against the railway boss H. Buckram Sartoris in the American South. The group becomes notorious fugitives of the law and is hunted down by the railway company.

During the pursuit, Rake is gunned down, and Bill and Von are sent to a chain gang. Bertha escapes but is lured into prostitution. She unexpectedly meets Von in a tavern for black people and learns that Bill broke out of jail and is now in hiding. Von leads Bertha to the hiding place where she experiences a sweet reunion with Bill before Sartoris's henchmen break in and crucify Bill.

Before they can leave, Von appears, eliminates the henchmen, and releases Bertha from bondage.

== Cast ==
- Barbara Hershey as Boxcar Bertha
- David Carradine as Big Bill Shelly
- Barry Primus as Rake Brown
- Bernie Casey as Von Morton
- Harry Northup as Deputy Sheriff Harvey Hall
- John Carradine as Sartoris
- Victor Argo as McIver #1
- David Osterhout as McIver #2

== Production ==
Martin Scorsese met Corman after coming to Hollywood to edit Medicine Ball Caravan. Corman, who had seen and liked Who's That Knocking at My Door during its 1970 run in Los Angeles, asked Scorsese to make a sequel to Bloody Mama. This was reworked into Boxcar Bertha after Julie Corman discovered Sister of the Road. He was given the lead actors, including Barbara Hershey, David Carradine, and Barry Primus, and a shooting schedule of 24 days in Arkansas. The Reader Railroad was used for the train scenes.

The limited budget of $600,000 forced Scorsese to reduce the size of the script and made him unable to film in Baton Rouge, Louisiana and Texarkana. Scorsese stated that he completely rewrote Rake Brown to the point that Brown represented Scorsese. The film was originally meant to end with Bertha dancing at a funeral in New Orleans surrounded by black people. Filming was done over the course of 24 days in Arkansas.

Boxcar Bertha contains many references to The Wonderful Wizard of Oz. Hershey has the same hair style as Dorothy in the opening and says not to pay attention to the man behind the curtain in the brothel. A joke on the set was that David Carradine was the Scarecrow, Bernie Casey was the Tin Man and Barry Primus was the Cowardly Lion.

The locomotive in those scenes was 1920 Baldwin 2-6-2 No. 108, which later saw service on the Conway Scenic Railroad in the late 1970s. The engine is currently at the Blacklands Railroad yard in Sulphur Springs, Texas, awaiting restoration. Locomotive No. 1702, a USATC S160 2-8-0 built by Baldwin in 1942, was seen in the film as well. The locomotive is now operational at the Great Smoky Mountains Railroad.

Scorsese makes a cameo in the film as one of Bertha's clients during the brothel montage.

Barbara Hershey later called the film "a lot of fun even though it's terribly crippled by Roger Corman and the violence and sex. But between the actors and Marty Scorsese the director, we had a lot of fun. We really had characters down but one tends to not see all that, because you end up seeing all the blood and sex." She was quoted as saying they had filmed the movie's sex scenes "without having to fake anything".

== Related works ==
A pictorial recreating sex scenes from the movie appeared in Playboy magazine in August 1972.

== Reception ==
Boxcar Bertha received mixed reviews from critics. It holds an approval rating of 59% with a mean of 5.7 of a possible 10 on review aggregator website Rotten Tomatoes based on 29 reviews. The website's critical consensus says, "Too derivative of other Roger Corman crime pictures to stand out, Boxcar Bertha feels more like a training exercise for a fledgling Martin Scorsese than a fully formed picture in its own right."

Scorsese screened a rough cut of the film for John Cassavetes. Cassavetes took him into his office and told him, "Marty, you've just spent a whole year of your life making a piece of shit. It's a good picture, but you're better than the people who make this kind of movie. Don't get hooked into the exploitation market, just try and do something different." This advice inspired Scorsese in working on his next film, Mean Streets.

Roger Ebert of the Chicago Sun-Times gave the film three stars out of four and called it "a weirdly interesting movie ... Director Martin Scorsese has gone for mood and atmosphere more than for action, and his violence is always blunt and unpleasant — never liberating and exhilarating, as the New Violence is supposed to be. We get the feeling we're inhabiting the dark night of a soul." The New York Times' Howard Thompson found the film to be an "interesting surprise", praising Carradine's "excellent" performance and the "beautiful" direction by Scorsese, "who really comes into his own here." Kevin Thomas of the Los Angeles Times wrote, "What is most impressive about Boxcar Bertha ... is how 28-year old director Martin Scorsese, in his first Hollywood venture, has managed to shape such familiar material into a viable film."

Arthur D. Murphy of Variety gave the film a negative review, writing, "Whatever its intentions, Boxcar Bertha is not much more than an excuse to slaughter a lot of people ... The final cut has stripped away whatever mood and motivation may have been in the script, leaving little more than fights, shotgun blasts, beatings and aimless movement." Gene Siskel of the Chicago Tribune gave the film one star out of four and called it a "trashy movie" with violence that "does not shock. It merely depresses." Tom Milne of The Monthly Film Bulletin declared: "Abrasively scripted, stunningly shot, and beautifully acted by David Carradine, Barbara Hershey and Barry Primus in particular, Boxcar Bertha is much more than the exploitation picture it has been written off as (by Variety, for instance) and makes a worthy companion piece to both Bloody Mama and Bonnie and Clyde."

== Works cited ==
- Wilson, Michael (2011). Scorsese On Scorsese. Cahiers du Cinéma. ISBN 9782866427023.
