= Life on Your Own =

Single by the Human League

from the album Hysteria
- B-side: "The World Tonight"
- Released: 18 June 1984
- Recorded: 1983–1984
- Studio: AIR (London)
- Genre: Synth-pop; new wave
- Length: 4:09
- Label: Virgin
- Songwriters: Philip Oakey; Jo Callis; Philip Adrian Wright
- Producers: Chris Thomas; Hugh Padgham

The Human League singles chronology
"The Lebanon" (1984)	"Life on Your Own" (1984)	"Louise" (1984)

Music video
- "Life on Your Own" on YouTube

"Life on Your Own" is a song by the English synth-pop band the Human League. Written jointly by lead vocalist Philip Oakey, keyboardists Jo Callis and Adrian Wright, it was recorded at AIR Studios during 1983–1984. Originally an album track on the band's fourth studio album Hysteria, it was then released as the second single from the album in the UK.

== Background ==
The song was conceived, written and recorded at a time when the band were under considerable pressure to provide Virgin Records with a follow-up album to equal the enormous international success of Dare (1981). The band had taken up residence in the £1,000-per-day AIR Studios; they were there a full year and were reportedly agonising and arguing over every note of every track. Dare producer Martin Rushent had already quit because of the rows and indecision causing further delays. Nick Heyward of Haircut One Hundred famously mocked the Human League in the media for taking the same time to program one drum machine as it took him to record his entire album at AIR Studios. The drum machine in question was the LinnDrum and it was being programmed for the track "Life on Your Own", a task that reportedly took two months.

"Life on Your Own" is heavily drum machine and synthesizer led, in stark contrast to the rock style of the band's previous single "The Lebanon". It was released as a single in June 1984, and became the band's ninth UK Top 20 hit, peaking at No. 16. It remained in the UK singles chart for a further six weeks.

== Promotional video ==
The music video for the song was filmed in London, England in April 1984. After the 'faux concert' scenario of "The Lebanon", the Human League returned to a themed story telling promotional video. Inspired by the American postapocalyptic action film The Omega Man (1971), the video features a lonely, survivalist Oakey in the role of 'the last man on Earth', roaming deserted London landmarks haunted by the ghosts of the band's female singers Susan Ann Sulley and Joanne Catherall. Some sections of the video were shot inside the empty White City Stadium just a few months before its demolition in 1985.

== Track listing ==
7" vinyl (Virgin VS688)

1. "Life on Your Own" – 4:10
2. "The World Tonight" – 4:09

12" vinyl (Virgin VS688-12)

1. "Life on Your Own" – 4:10
2. "The World Tonight" – 4:09
3. "Life on Your Own" (extended) – 5:43
