= Gretchen Oehler =

American actress

Gretchen Oehler (December 13, 1943 – September 8, 2001) was an American actress, most recognized for her long-running role as Vivien Gorrow on the soap operas Another World and Texas.

Oehler attended the Goodman School of Drama in Chicago, now the theatre department at DePaul University, winning the prestigious Sarah Siddons Society scholarship for the 1964–65 school year. In January 1965, Oehler played Miss Amelia Evans to rave reviews in a special adaptation for the Goodman Theater stage of The Ballad of the Sad Café by playwright Edward Albee. In October 1977, she debuted as Miss Wells in the hugely successful Broadway revival of Dracula. Oehler continued in the part for 900 performances, appearing opposite Frank Langella and later fellow soap actor Christopher Bernau (Alan Spaulding, Guiding Light) in the title role.

Concurrent with her Broadway run, Oehler joined the cast of the NBC daytime soap Another World in May 1978 as Vivien Gorrow, the eccentric but lovable maid of spoiled Iris Cory (first played by Beverlee McKinsey and then by Carmen Duncan). Oehler remained on Another World until February 1981, when she crossed over to AW's sister soap Texas in episode 134. After Texas was cancelled on December 31, 1982, the actress returned to Another World as Vivien for two additional runs (February 1983-May 1984 and September 1988-December 1990).

In the 1990s, Gretchen Oehler was diagnosed with cancer. She died in Moose, Wyoming.
