= Von Richthofen and Brown =

1971 film by Roger Corman

- Theatrical release poster
- Directed by: Roger Corman
- Written by: John William Corrington; Joyce Hooper Corrington
- Produced by: Gene Corman
- Starring: John Phillip Law; Don Stroud; Barry Primus; Karen Huston
- Cinematography: Michael Reed
- Edited by: Alan Collins
- Music by: Hugo Friedhofer
- Production company: The Corman Company
- Distributed by: United Artists
- Release date: July 28, 1971
- Running time: 97 minutes
- Country: United States
- Language: English
- Budget: under $1 million or $950,000
- Box office: 108,851 admissions (France)

Von Richthofen and Brown, alternatively titled The Red Baron, is a 1971 American war film directed by Roger Corman and starring John Phillip Law and Don Stroud as Manfred von Richthofen and Roy Brown. Although names of real people are used and embedded in basic historic facts, the story by Joyce Hooper Corrington and John William Corrington makes no claim to be historically accurate, and in fact is largely fictional.

== Plot ==
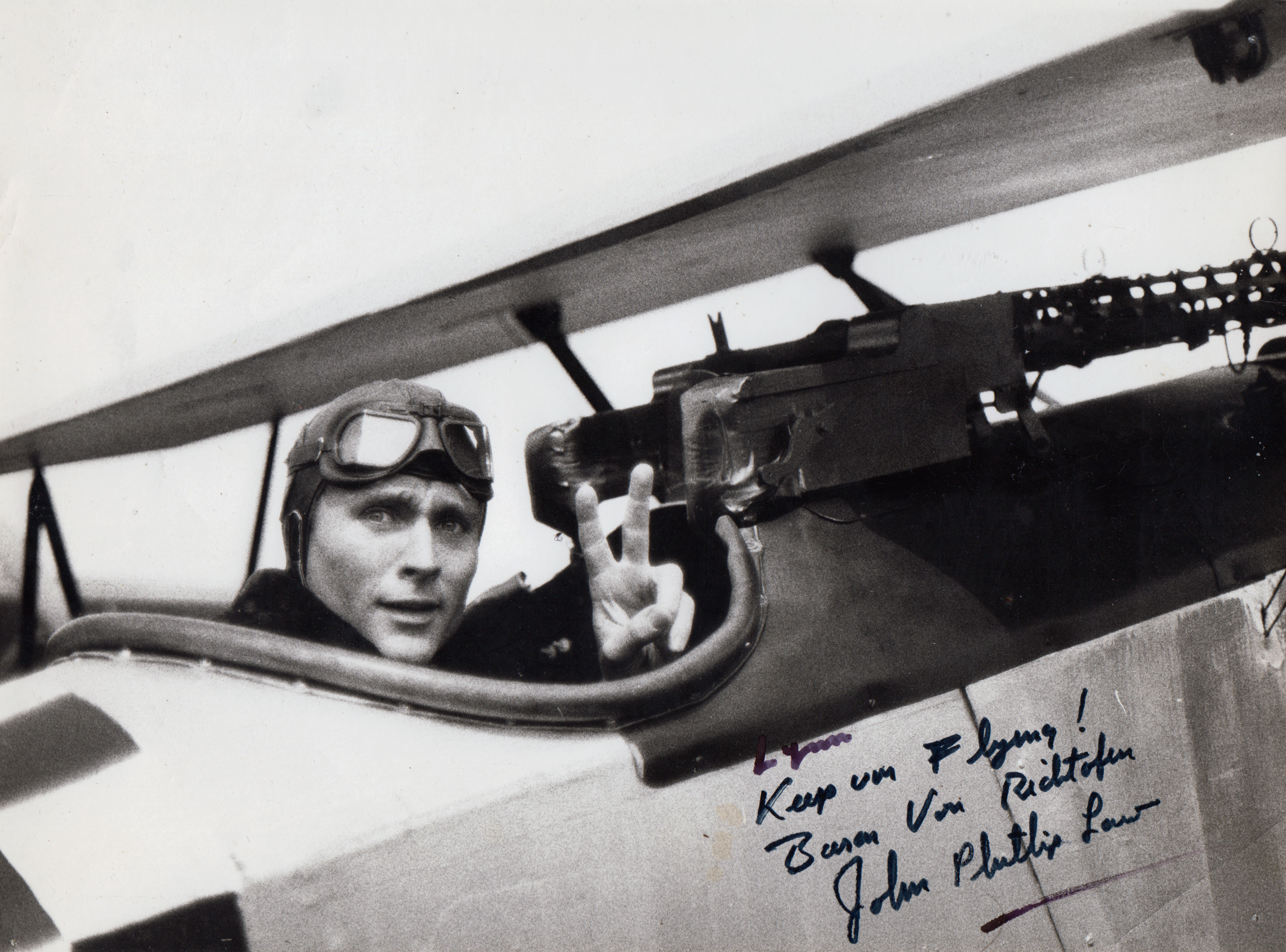
Law in a publicity still

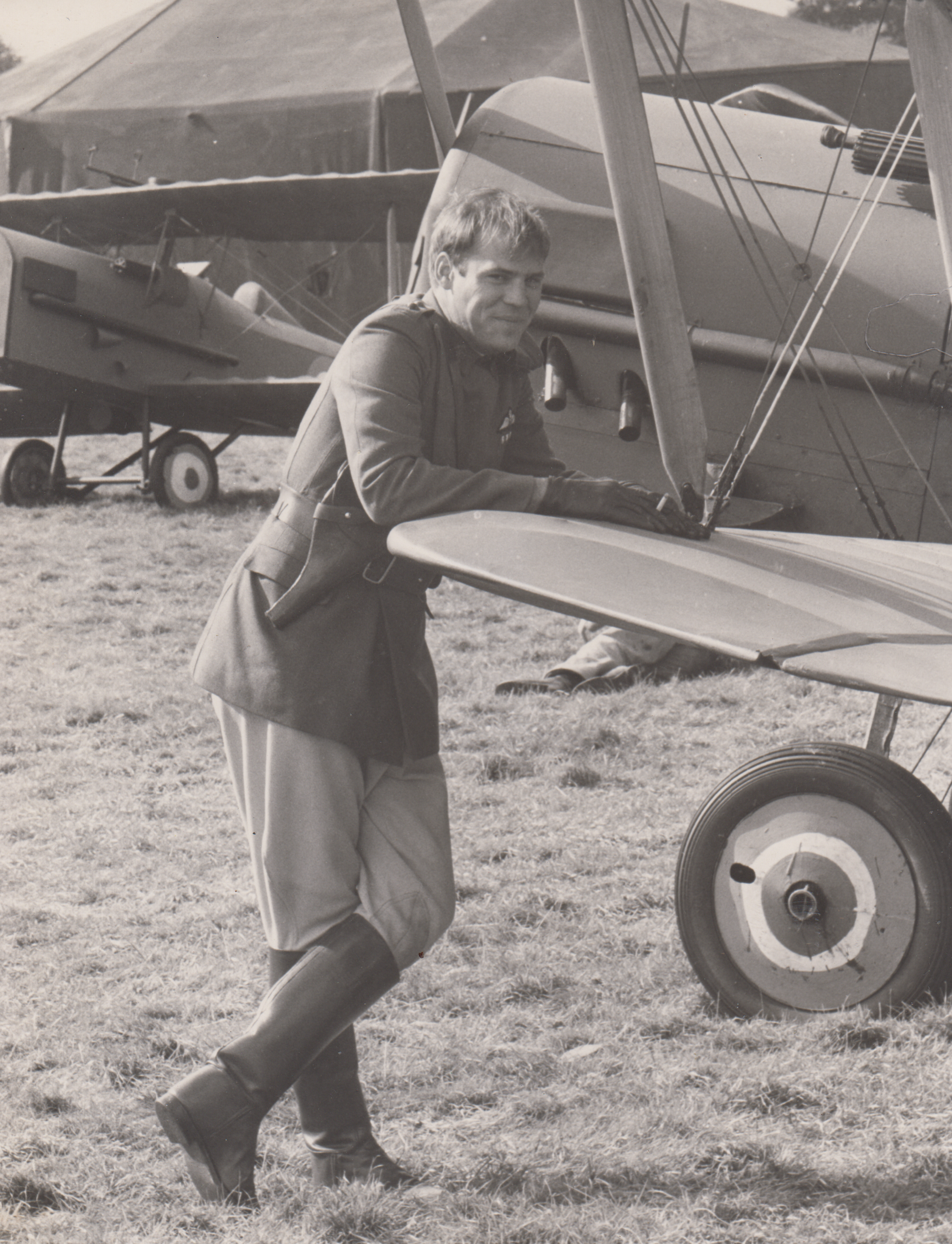
Don Stroud at Lynn Garrison's aviation facility in Ireland.

Manfred von Richthofen is an average pilot in a German air squadron under the command of Oswald Boelcke. Richthofen, who believes in a gentlemanly approach to war, meets fellow pilots Werner Voss, Ernst Udet and Hermann Göring. He earns his first kills and learns advice from Boelcke. Lothar von Richthofen, Manfred's brother, joins the squadron. Across the lines, Canadian wheat farmer Roy Brown arrives at a British squadron under the command of Lanoe Hawker. The cynical Brown stirs the irate of the squadron when he refuses to join in a toast to Richthofen.

During a dogfight, Boelcke is killed in a mid-air collision, when being chased by Hawker. Richthofen pursues Hawker who gives him a wave; Hawker is killed by Richthofen. Göring acknowledges the kill with a wave to Richthofen but after landing, Göring blames Richthofen for Boelcke's death but the other pilots accuse Göring of causing Boelcke's death. The government give Richthofen command of the squadron. Outraged by an order to camouflage his squadron's aircraft, he paints them in bright conspicuous colors, stating that gentlemen should not hide from their enemies. May, Brown's school friend joins the British squadron. At the home of Anthony Fokker, Richthofen meets Ilse, a beautiful singer who takes Richthofen's mind off airplanes. He dances with Ilse and, after being shown Fokker's new plane, kisses her when they are left alone.

Brown bullies the pilots into having the squadron hunt in packs with a plane as bait. Göring damages Brown's plane but Brown lands and escapes before the plane explodes. After Murphy kills Voss, Murphy inflicts a bullet wound on Richthofen's head. Richthofen is forced into a crash landing and is saved by German soldiers from capture by British soldiers. Brown and his squadron attack Richthofen's airfield, destroying their aircraft on the ground, and wounding Lothar in the leg. At the British airfield, the men learn they may have bombed a hospital, and realise they are now beyond the point of honor. Richthofen, upon his return, shows troubling signs of memory loss and confusion, when he thinks Voss is alive. With the help of a batch of new fighter aircraft from Anthony Fokker, Richthofen and his men launch a retaliation attack on the British airfield. During the raid, Göring strafes medical personnel, an act which Richthofen criticizes.

Richthofen is disheartened by the fact the German squadron is losing so many pilots. He is offered a job offer from the government to plan for another War, based around anti-Jewish and anti-comunist betrayal. A disgusted Richthofen refuses, deciding stay with his men. When an outraged General balks, Richthofen acknowledges he rather die in combat. Brown becomes defeatist believing that war will never end. Göring is grounded while Richthofen sets out to fly again. The German and British squadron fight again; Richthofen forces May down on the ground and engages Brown. The positions reverse and Richthofen is mortally wounded by Brown; he lands his plane before he dies. May, Murphy and the British pilots congratulate Brown. Lothar mourns Manfred's death. Richthofen is buried with full military honors by the Allies. Göring assumes command of the German squadron.

== Cast ==
- John Phillip Law as Manfred von Richthofen
- Don Stroud as Roy Brown
- Barry Primus as Hermann Göring
- Corin Redgrave as Lanoe Hawker
- Karen Huston as Ilse
- Hurd Hatfield as Anthony Fokker
- Stephen McHattie as Werner Voss
- Brian Foley as Lothar von Richthofen
- Robert La Tourneaux as Ernst Udet
- Peter Masterson as Oswald Boelcke
- David Weston as Murphy
- Tom Adams as Owen
- Seamus Forde as Kaiser Wilhelm II
- Maureen Cusack as Richthofen's mother
- Ferdy Mayne as Richthofen's father
- Lorraine Rainer as French girl in the woods

== Production ==
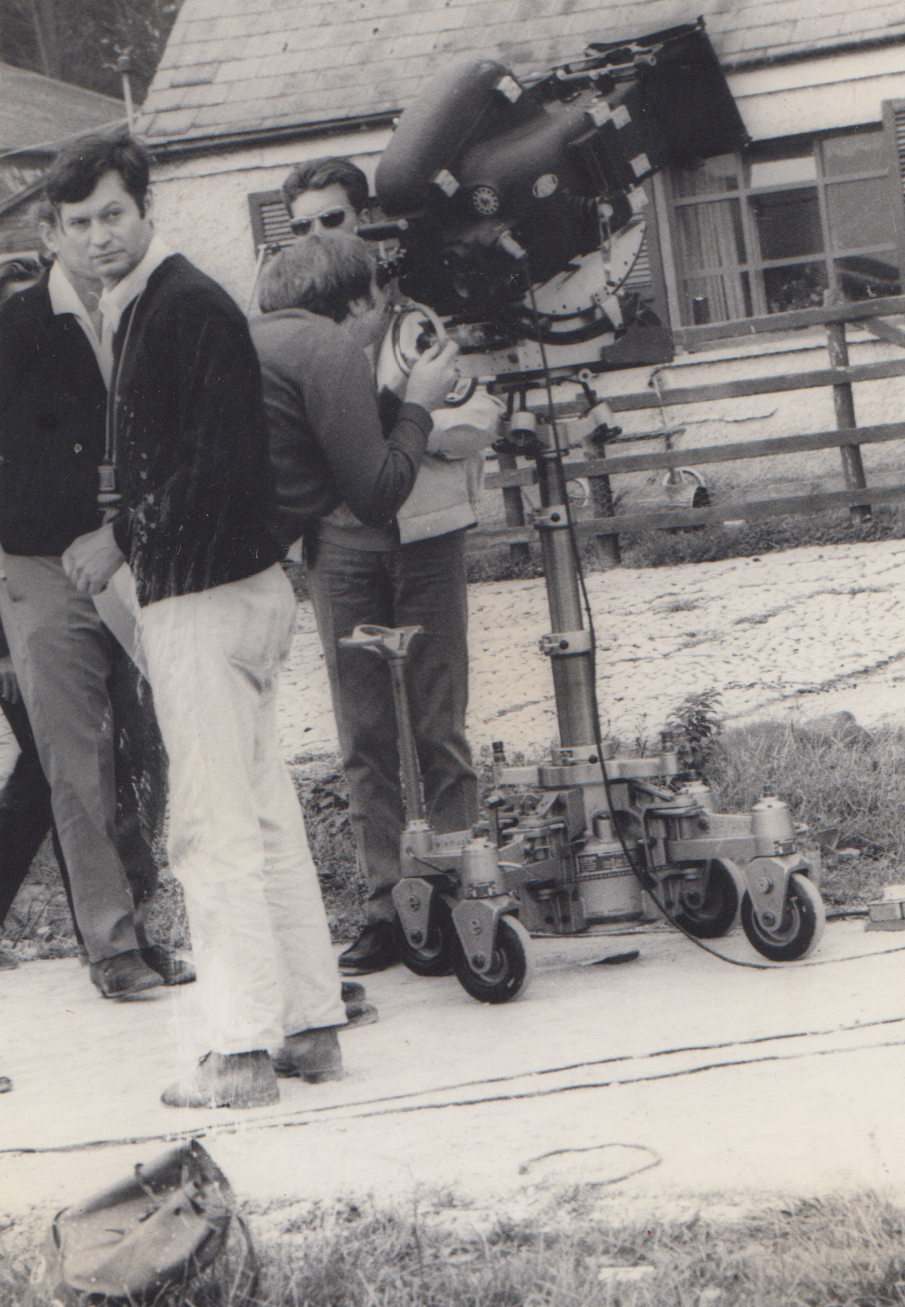
Roger Corman on set, 1970.

=== Development ===
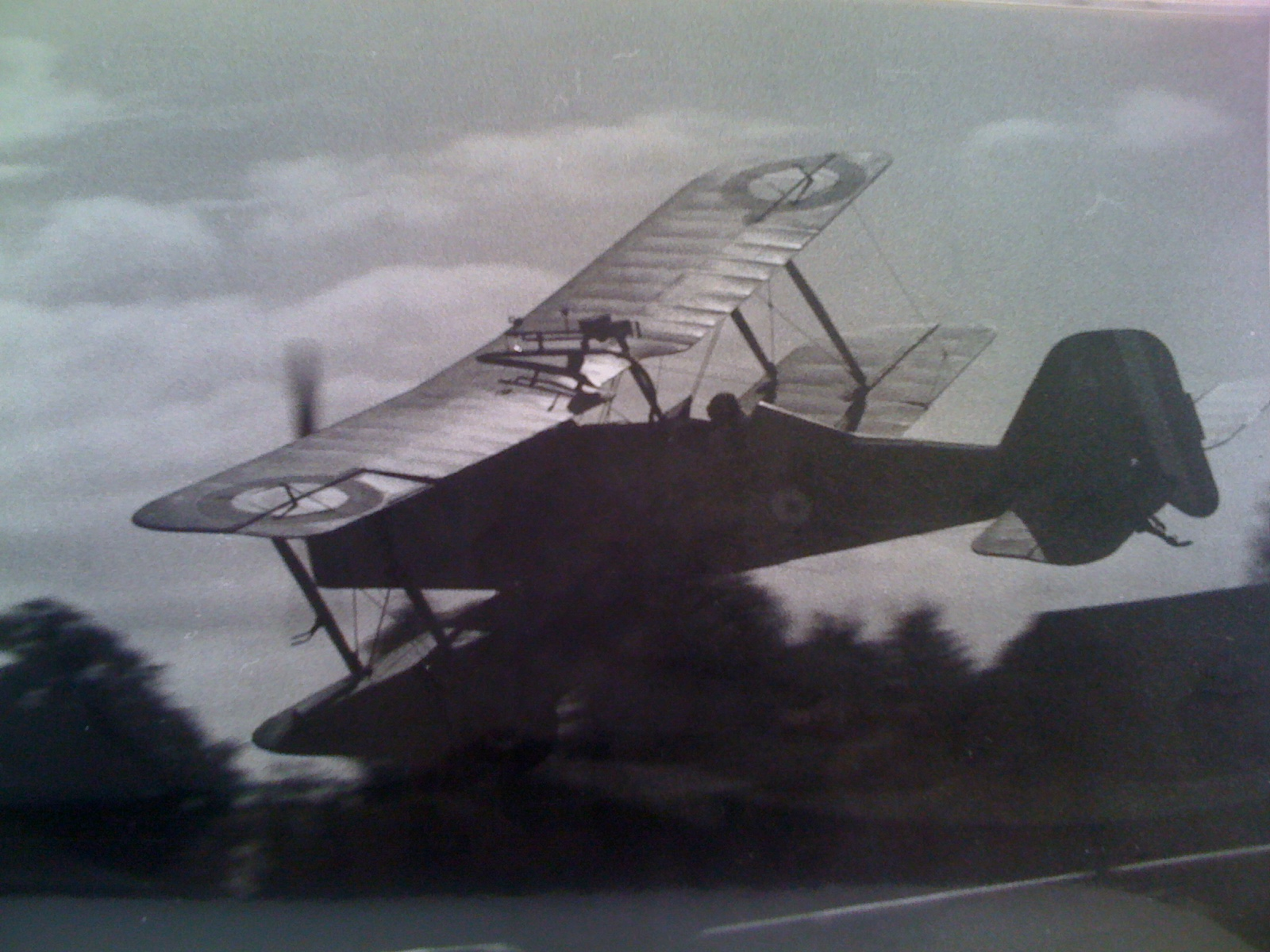
Miles-built S.E.5 replica flown by Charles Boddington, five seconds before fatal crash on 15 September 1970

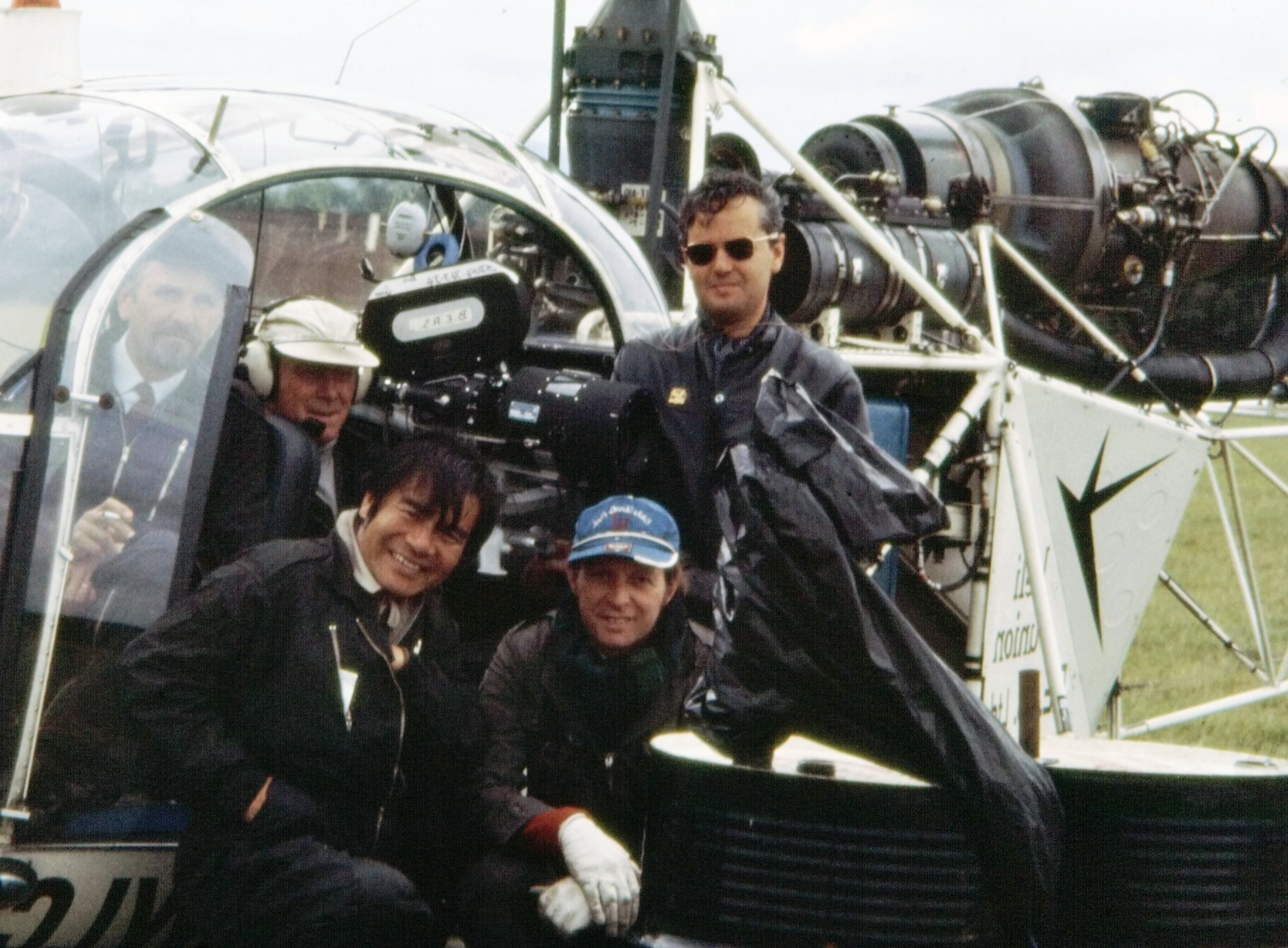
Camera crew (1970): Peter Peckowski and Peter Allwork in cockpit, Jimmy Murakami, Shay Corcoran and Lynn Garrison

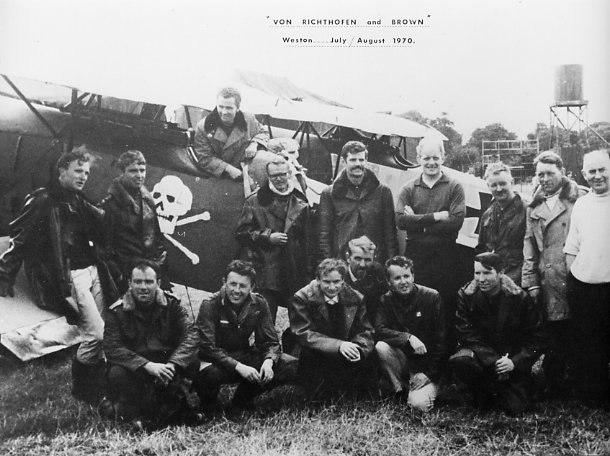
Irish Air Corps pilots filming Von Richthofen and Brown, 1970. Lynn Garrison is second from right, front row.

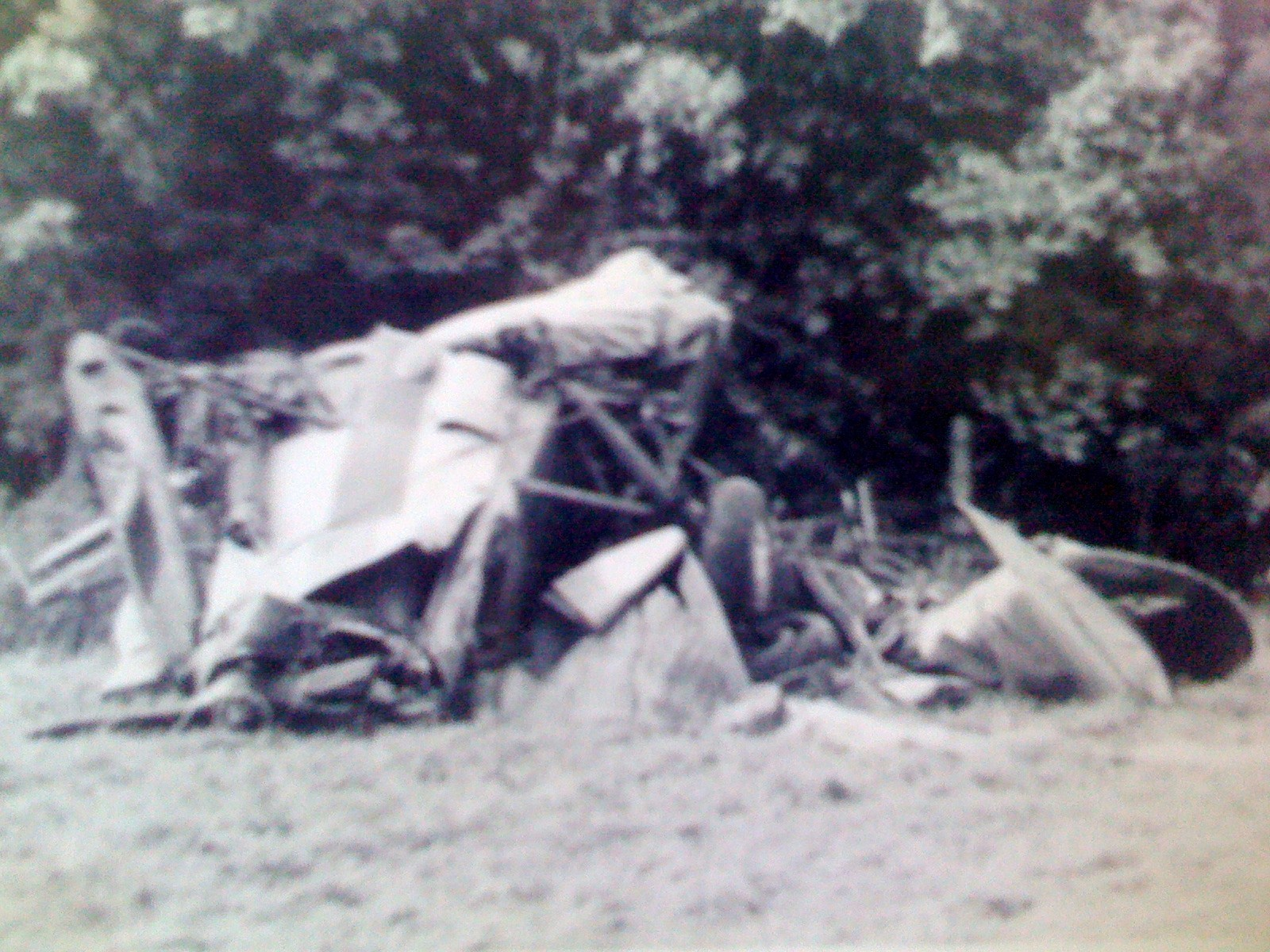
Lynn Garrison, Don Stroud crash September 16, 1970 SV4.C Stampe

Roger Corman had been interested in making a film about Manfred von Richthofen for years. Although the project was to focus on Richthofen only, studio executives felt it would make the film "too German" and Canadian pilot Roy Brown, who was credited with shooting Richthofen down, although there is debate as to who actually killed Richthofen, was added to the film. Corman felt that Richthofen was an aristocratic warrior, and wanted to contrast Richthofen with Brown.

In 1965 it was announced he had commissioned a script called The Red Baron from Robert Towne. He pitched the project to 20th Century Fox along with the St Valentine's Day Massacre; Fox decided to make the latter, as they already had The Blue Max.

Years later Corman signed a deal with United Artists who liked the idea of a film about the Red Baron but did not want the film to be too German, so Corman agreed to make it about Roy Brown and other characters from both areas of the battle front that could be added to the script.

Although the story of the two foes who meet in a fateful last flight, was essentially a historical subject, Corman's intention was to treat the subject as an allegory of the modern war machine in conflict with antiquated old world notions of chivalry. Corman elaborated:

Von Richthofen, an aristocrat, was the last of the knights. He was the last to represent chivalry in combat. Whereas Roy Brown, the so-called hero, was a garage mechanic from Canada who was so frightened of flying that he got ulcers and had to drink a quart of milk before he could take off. That's the man who killed The Red Baron. Another telling point was that the man who took this gentlemanly flyer’s place was Hermann Goering. I took all that and played upon the theme that World War I ended the concept of chivalry and honor among soldiers in combat and ushered in the era of mass slaughter of the ordinary man. I tried to underscore the fact that Von Richthofen was already an anachronism but didn't realize it.

Work on the film went ahead, with Corman able to work with a much larger budget than he enjoyed with his earlier features. Ex-RCAF pilot Lynn Garrison supplied the aircraft, crews and facilities, and personally coordinated the flying sequences; Garrison had purchased the collection of hangars, aircraft, vehicles and support equipment accumulated for filming 20th Century's top-grossing film, The Blue Max, after the production wrapped in 1965. (Note: Alun Evans in Brassey's Guide to War Films, compared and contrasted the two features, noting that both aerial films were spectacular, albeit flawed.) The collection included replica Pfalz D.IIIs, Royal Aircraft Factory S.E.5s, Fokker D.VIIs, Fokker Dr.Is. A number of de Havilland DH.82A Tiger Moths and Stampe SV.4Cs had also been converted to represent other aircraft, for a total of 12 aircraft available for aerial scenes. As with The Blue Max, flying sequences were based at Weston Airport in Ireland. Richard Bach, author of Jonathan Livingston Seagull, was one of the film's stunt pilots, and wrote about some of his experiences at Weston during its production.

United Artists who were financing the picture turned down Bruce Dern, who was Corman's original choice for Roy Brown. Don Stroud - whom Corman had selected to play Richthofen - was given the role instead and John Phillip Law was cast as the Baron. "It was a good cast, although I believe my original cast would have been stronger. Stroud would have been right as Von Richthofen and Dern would have been excellent, excellent as Brown," said Corman.

Gene Corman however said he wanted to cast Helmut Berger as the Red Baron. "But the geniuses at United Artists wanted John Phillip Law, who was as American as corn. It started out to be a double-A picture, and then it just became a film. If we had Helmut Berger, we could have recouped our money just in Germany alone! I think the experience soured Roger on directing. It was a real opportunity to make an A film."

Corman disliked the convention of German characters in war films to speak in German accents and wanted to have them speak in an unaccented voice. He said United Artists agreed.

=== Shooting ===
For the aerial sequences, Corman used an Aérospatiale Alouette II helicopter, along with a Helio Courier, for the photography, supported by a number of specialized camera mounts Garrison developed for use on individual aircraft. This allowed footage of actors, such as John Philip Law and Don Stroud "flying" the aircraft. Garrison trained Law and Stroud to the point where they could take off, land a Stampe, and fly basic sequences themselves from the rear seat, filmed with a rear-facing camera. Stunt pilots such as Bach were used for the more complicated sequences.

Corman used a filming schedule that included so-called "Blue Days, Grey Days and Don’t Give a Damn Days" so that the aircraft were used no matter what the weather presented.

On 15 September 1970, Charles Boddington, a veteran of both The Blue Max and Darling Lili, was killed when his S.E.5 spun in during a low-level manoeuvre over the airfield. The next day, during the last scheduled flight on the shooting schedule, Garrison and Stroud were involved in a low-level sequence across Lake Weston in a Stampe, when a jackdaw struck Garrison in the face, knocking him unconscious. The aircraft then ran through five powerlines, snap rolled and plunged into the River Liffey inverted. Garrison and Stroud were rescued from the water. Stroud was uninjured, but Garrison required 60 stitches to close a head wound. Both incidents occurring in such a short period resulted in Irish authorities grounding the production. Corman lobbied for restoration of flying and a few days later, was successful.

Don Stroud said " Four people died on that film! I would’ve been five, and the pilot six, but we both survived. I remember watching a plane go right into a helicopter — BLAM! — and then this other guy was landing in front of me, and he hit a fuckin' truck! Killed the driver of the truck and the pilot! Oh, it was unbelievable. Every week somebody got killed."

Some of the interior shots in Von Richthofen and Brown were filmed at Powerscourt House, a noted stately home in County Wicklow, Ireland. Powerscourt had been designed by Richard Cassels, a German architect, and the entrance hall had a Germanic motif, lending a visual connection to a German location. (Note: Powerscourt House was also used for scenes in Stanley Kubrick's Barry Lyndon a few years later. The house was destroyed in an accidental fire in 1974, so the films shot there serve as a record for the lost interiors and valuable artifacts, including some left there by Oliver Cromwell.) Some external shots were filmed outside the Irish parliament building, Leinster House.

=== Post Production ===
A sex scene between Law and Karen Huston was edited out after it caused a preview audience to laugh.

Corman says when United Artists saw the final cut they insisted the actors be redubbed so that the German characters had accents. This made Corman walk off the film. He said character actors did the dubbing and "it heavily damaged the film."

Corman found the movie exhausting. He later said "by that time I had directed somewhere between fifty and sixty films in, I think, twelve or thirteen years... I was so tired, I remember each day as I drove out from Dublin, and I'd come to a fork in the road. One way was the airport where we were shooting and the other was to Galway Bay. Each day I came to that fork in the road I thought I would just like to drive to Galway Bay. I barely completed the film, so I said to myself, I will complete this film, but I'm going to take a year off, the traditional sabbatical rest."

Although heavily involved as a producer during the interim, he did not direct another film until Frankenstein Unbound (1990).

== Reception ==
Von Richthofen and Brown received mixed to negative reviews from both viewers and critics, although Roger Greenspun, in his review for The New York Times saw Corman's work as "... an extraordinarily impressive movie by a filmmaker whose career has not always been marked by success, or even noble failure." Critics also connected Corman's anti-war views with the central characters of the film, seeing the antagonists as representing the modern relentless killing machine versus old world chivalry.

As an aviation epic, reviewer Leonard Maltin noted, "Aerial work is excellent, it's the ground work which crashes."

Corman later reflected, "When I was making the low budget films, AIP or whomever I was working for would really let me do whatever I wanted...When I started to get up to the million-dollar level, people started second guessing me like crazy. They wouldn't pay attention to my suggestions or requests."

Derek Elley, in a review of 2008's The Red Baron, compared Von Richthofen and Brown more better. Stephen Larson criticised the script and performances of the cast as "wooden" but praised the air scenes. Reviewer Glenn Erickson felt that the combat scenes became too much and compared it unfavourably to The Blue Max. Douglas Buck praised the dogfights but criticised the script, in particular a scene where Brown encounters a French Girl with a missing leg, and awkwardly leaves. Jeffery Knight criticised the script.

== See also ==
- List of American films of 1971
- The Red Baron (2008 film)
