= The Omega Man =

1971 American science fiction film directed by Boris Sagal

- Theatrical release poster
- Directed by: Boris Sagal
- Screenplay by: John William Corrington; Joyce H. Corrington
- Based on: I Am Legend; 1954 novel by Richard Matheson
- Produced by: Walter Seltzer
- Starring: Charlton Heston; Anthony Zerbe; Rosalind Cash
- Cinematography: Russell Metty
- Edited by: William H. Ziegler
- Music by: Ron Grainer
- Production company: Walter Seltzer Productions
- Distributed by: Warner Bros.
- Release date: August 1, 1971
- Running time: 98 minutes
- Country: United States
- Language: English
- Box office: $4 million (rentals)

The Omega Man (stylized as The Ωmega Man) is a 1971 American post-apocalyptic action film directed by Boris Sagal and starring Charlton Heston as a survivor of a pandemic. It was written by John William Corrington and Joyce Hooper Corrington, based on the 1954 novel I Am Legend by Richard Matheson. The film's producer, Walter Seltzer, went on to work with Heston again in the dystopian science-fiction film Soylent Green in 1973.

The Omega Man is the second adaptation of Matheson's novel. The first was The Last Man on Earth (1964), which starred Vincent Price. A third adaptation, I Am Legend, starring Will Smith, was released in 2007, and appropriated this film's tagline.

== Plot ==
In March 1975, a Sino-Soviet border conflict escalates into full-scale war in which biological warfare destroys most of the human race. U.S. Army Colonel Robert Neville is a scientist based in Los Angeles, California who tests vaccines. About to succumb to the plague, he injects himself with an experimental vaccine and is rendered immune.

By August 1977, Neville believes he is the only immune survivor of the plague. He spends his days patrolling a desolate Los Angeles to kill members of "the Family", a cult of plague victims turned into homicidal nocturnal albino mutants. Neville lives in a fortified apartment building with a private arsenal. He is besieged by the Family, whose attempts to kill him with archaic weapons all fail. The Family rejects scientific knowledge and blames technology for the war. When Neville is looting an abandoned department store he spots a healthy woman, who flees from him. He unsuccessfully pursues her and concludes he had imagined it, having earlier hallucinated about telephones ringing.

The Family finally captures Neville who find him guilty of heresy in a show trial held by the Family's leader, former television news anchor Jonathan Matthias. Neville is sentenced to be burned at the stake in Dodger Stadium. He's rescued by Lisa, the woman he had earlier dismissed as a hallucination, and Dutch, a former medical student. Lisa and Dutch are part of a group of survivors holed-up at a former radio transmitter in the Hollywood Hills. All are younger than 30 years old. Their youthful resistance to the disease will not prevent their eventual death by it. Neville concludes that salvaging humanity is possible but it will take years to duplicate his successful vaccine. In the short term he plans to extend his immunity with serum from his own blood.

Neville and Lisa treat Lisa's brother Richie, nearly dead from the disease, in Neville's apartment. A romantic encounter is derailed when the power goes off. The Family is attacking. Matthias' second-in-command, Brother Zachary, scales up to the open balcony. Neville leaves Lisa to restart the generator in the basement garage and returns to the apartment to shoot Zachary.

Neville and Lisa plan to take the other survivors and start new lives in the Sierra Nevada wilderness several hundred miles north of Los Angeles. The serum cures Richie who reveals the Family's headquarters is in the Los Angeles Civic Center. He pleads that Nevile show the Family mercy by administering his cure to them as well. Neville, consumed by hate, refuses and Richie seeks out the Family to convince them to take the serum. Matthias won't believe Neville would help them, accuses Richie of spying, and has him tortured and executed.

Richie had left a note for Neville, who rushes to rescue him and finds his ravaged corpse tied to a judge's chair in a courtroom. He returns to the apartment unaware that Lisa has both succumbed to the disease and given Matthias and his followers access to the home. Matthias forces Neville to watch as the Family sets his home and equipment on fire. Neville breaks outside, attempts to shoot Matthias, looking down from the balcony, but the gun jams. Matthias hurls the spear Zachary left behind and wounds Neville.

Dutch and the survivors discover Neville lying in a fountain. He hands Dutch a flask of the blood serum and dies. Dutch takes Lisa away, weakened and compliant because of the sunlight, and the survivors leave the city forever.

== Cast ==
- Charlton Heston as Robert Neville
- Anthony Zerbe as Jonathan Matthias
- Rosalind Cash as Lisa
- Paul Koslo as Dutch
- Eric Laneuville as Richie
- Lincoln Kilpatrick as Zachary
- Brian Tochi as Tommy

== Production ==
The film differs from the novel (and the previous film) in several ways. In the novel, humanity is destroyed by a bacterial plague spread by bats and mosquitoes, which turns the population into vampire-like creatures; whereas, in this film version, biological warfare is the cause of the plague that kills most of the population by asphyxiation and turns most of the rest into nocturnal albino mutants. Screenwriter Joyce Corrington holds a doctorate in chemistry and felt that this was more suitable for an adaptation.

In Charlton Heston's autobiography, In the Arena: An Autobiography, he mentioned that the "crucifixion" scene with Neville was not in the original script. As it turns out, the scene was felt to fit quite well into the storyline, so was left in.

Exterior filming took place throughout the Los Angeles area in late 1970. Neville's house was on the backlot of the Warner Bros. Ranch; it was demolished in 2023 as part of the entire site's redevelopment. As part of the plot, the filmmakers needed to create a depopulated metropolis. Without CGI, this was accomplished by filming on Sunday mornings in the center of the Los Angeles' business district, which in late 1970 was quiet on early weekend mornings. Despite careful planning by the film crew, some exterior shots captured bystanders and moving cars in the background of some scenes.

=== Interracial kiss ===
Charlton Heston and Rosalind Cash about to kiss in a scene from The Omega Man

Whoopi Goldberg remarked that the kiss between the characters played by Charlton Heston and Rosalind Cash was one of the first interracial kisses to appear in a movie (1957's Island in the Sun often quoted as being the first mainstream Hollywood movie to do so). In 1992, when Goldberg had her own network interview talk show, she invited Heston to be a guest, and asked him about the kiss. After discussing whether Heston received any flak for the kiss at the time, Goldberg said that she wished that society could get past interracial relationships being an issue, at which point Heston leaned forward and demonstrated on the unsuspecting Goldberg, to her delight.

Screenwriter Joyce H. Corrington stated that in developing the script for The Omega Man, the character of Lisa, played by Rosalind Cash, was created due to the rise of the Black Power movement, which was particularly prominent in American culture at the time the film was made. She goes on to remark that this created an effective and interesting dynamic between the characters of Lisa and Neville.

Heston wrote in his autobiography that The Omega Man was Cash's first leading role in a film, and that she was understandably "a little edgy" about doing a love scene with him. Heston explained, "It was in the seventies that I realized a generation of actors had grown up who saw me in terms of the iconic roles they remembered from their childhoods. 'It's a spooky feeling,' she told me, 'to screw Moses.'"

=== Deleted scene ===
The script for The Omega Man includes a scene in which Lisa visits her parents’ grave. Unknown to Neville, she is pregnant and seeks comfort from them before she and Neville leave the city for good. While speaking at the gravesite, Lisa hears a noise and investigates a nearby crypt, where she witnesses a female member of the Family placing a dead newborn mutant.

Observing the mother’s grief, Lisa empathizes with her loss despite their opposing sides. She fears that all children, including her unborn baby, may face a similar fate. Later, Lisa recounts the encounter to Neville. When he asks whether she “took care” of the situation, Lisa replies that, as she may soon be a grieving parent herself, she could not bring herself to kill a mourning mother. Initially shocked, Neville ultimately embraces her.

Although this scene was cut from the final film, the screen credit for “Woman in Cemetery Crypt” (Anna Aries) was retained.

== Release ==
The film opened at three theaters in Houston in July 1971.

== Reception ==
At the film review aggregator website Rotten Tomatoes, The Omega Man received mixed reviews, with a combined average positive score of 65% from 34 critics. Metacritic, which uses a weighted average, assigned the film a score of 56 out of 100, based on 7 critics, indicating "mixed or average" reviews.

Howard Thompson gave a mostly negative review in The New York Times, saying, "the climax is as florid and phony as it can be," while A.D. Murphy of Variety described the film as "an extremely literate science-fiction drama." Roger Ebert awarded two stars out of four and found the mutants "a little too ridiculous to quite fulfill their function in the movie." Gene Siskel of the Chicago Tribune gave the film one star out of four, writing that director Boris Sagal "must have resembled a juggler trying to keep four dramatic balls aloft. About midway through the film, the balls started bumping into each other, Sagal began to stumble, and by the time the crew was completing the final scene, Sagal was on the floor with the balls bouncing wildly away from his grasp." Kevin Thomas of the Los Angeles Times wrote that the film was "strictly a potboiler, but it's without pretensions and never runs dry. Director Boris Sagal has captured some stark apocalyptic images and gotten some suitably vivid performances. Most importantly, he keeps things moving so fast that there's not enough time to ponder credibility gaps big enough to fly a Boeing 747 through." Tom Shales of The Washington Post wrote, "Director Sagal displays no great affinity for science fiction — he's from TV land — but he generally upholds interest and can certainly handle the shocks and suspense, which are both abundant and enjoyable in a Saturday matinee way."

Director Tim Burton said in an interview for his 2009 Museum of Modern Art exhibit, "If I was alone on a desert island, I'd probably pick something that I could relate to—probably The Omega Man with Charlton Heston. I don't know why that is one of my favorite movies, but it is." In another interview, with the Australian Centre for the Moving Image, Burton remarked that no matter how many times he has seen it, if it is on television, he will stop to watch it. He said that when he originally saw The Omega Man, it was the first instance that he recalls seeing the use of certain types of "cheesy one-liners" in film. The film is full of irony-tinged one-liners that are spoken in a manner to elicit a comic response. Burton compares these to the famous one-liners in Arnold Schwarzenegger's film career, such as "I'll be back."

As with The Last Man on Earth, The Omega Man was not to Richard Matheson's liking, though it did not provoke much of a reaction from the author, either. "The Omega Man was so removed from my book that it didn’t even bother me," Matheson said.

=== Box office ===
The film grossed $29,900 in its first week. It went on to earn $4 million in theatrical rentals in the United States and Canada.

== In popular culture ==
- The first short in The Simpsons' Treehouse of Horror VIII (1997) special, "The HΩmega Man", is an homage to the film, with its basic story happening in Springfield.
- Famous Paraguayan-Argentine comic-book writer Robin Wood and Argentine artist Ricardo Villagrán created the 1970s classic Argentine historieta (comic) Mark strictly based on The Omega Man's postapocalyptic world. The eponymous hero and protagonist, Mark, is also based on Neville's character concept of a man of action.
- Bob McKenzie, in the beginning of the film Strange Brew, states, "I was kind of like a one-man force like Charlton Heston in Omega Man. Did you see it? It was beauty."
- The 1981 album Ghost in the Machine by The Police features a track "Omegaman" (also stylised as "Ωmegaman") written by Andy Summers, based on the film.
- The music video for The Human League's 1984 single "Life on Your Own" was based on the film.
- The scene in which Heston's character watches Woodstock inspired Joel Hodgson to create Mystery Science Theater 3000.
- Inspired by the film, the Electro Industrial band Revolting Cocks included a track called "We Shall Cleanse the World" on their debut album "Big Sexy Land". The song's lyrics seem to refer to Neville's drive across Los Angeles searching for members of "The Family". Also, numerous clips of dialogue spoken by Anthony Zerbe's character Mathias are used through the song.

== See also ==
- List of American films of 1971
- Survival film, about the film genre, with a list of related films
