= John William Corrington =

American screenwriter

- Born: October 28, 1932; Memphis, Tennessee, United States
- Died: November 24, 1988 (aged 56); Malibu, California, United States
- Occupations: Screenwriter, novelist, poet, lawyer
- Spouse: Joyce Elaine Hooper (m. 1960)
- Children: 4

John William Corrington (October 28, 1932 – November 24, 1988) was an American film and television writer, novelist, poet and lawyer.

== Biography ==
A Roman Catholic, Corrington attended St. John's High School (now known as Loyola College Prep), but was expelled after smoking cigarettes on the front steps of the parish church next door. Ultimately, he graduated from C. E. Byrd High School, in Shreveport, Louisiana.

He earned his B.A. degree from Centenary College in 1956 and his Master of Arts from Rice University in 1960, the year he took on his first teaching position in the English department at Louisiana State University. While on leave from LSU, Corrington obtained his doctor of philosophy in 1965, from the University of Sussex, and then moved to Loyola University New Orleans in 1966, as an associate professor of English, where he also served as chair of the English department. Corrington graduated from Tulane University Law School in 1975, joined a small New Orleans personal-injury law firm, Plotkin and Bradley, and spent the next three years practicing law.

== Literary career ==
During this time Corrington published four books of poetry, Where We Are (1962), The Anatomy of Love (1964), Mr. Clean (1964), and Lines to the South (1965). With Miller Williams, Corrington edited Southern Writing in the Sixties: Fiction (1966) and Southern Writing in the Sixties: Poetry (1967). Corrington also published four books of short stories, The Lonesome Traveler (1968), The Actes and Monuments (1978), The Southern Reporter (1981) and All My Trials (1987) and four novels, And Wait for the Night (1964), The Upper Hand (1967), The Bombardier (1970), and Shad Sentell (1984). He won an award in fiction from the National Endowment for the Arts, and had a story included in the O. Henry Award Stories (1976) and three in the Best American Short Stories series, (1973, 1976, and 1977).

With his wife, Joyce, Corrington wrote five screenplays, Von Richthofen and Brown (1969), The Omega Man (1970), Boxcar Bertha (1971), The Arena (1972), and Battle for the Planet of the Apes (1973) and a television film, The Killer Bees (1974).

Corrington gave up the practice of law in 1978, and his wife Joyce and he became head writers for daytime serials. The Corringtons scripted Search for Tomorrow (1978–1980), Another World (1980), Texas (1980–1981), General Hospital (1982; hired by Gloria Monty), Capitol (1982–1983, hired by John Conboy), and One Life to Live (1984). They also wrote and produced Superior Court, a syndicated series (1986–1989). Texas and Superior Court were each nominated twice for a Daytime Emmy Award.

During this time, the Corringtons also published So Small a Carnival (1986), A Project Named Desire (1987), A Civil Death (1987), and The White Zone (1990). After Bill Corrington's sudden death from a heart attack, his novella, "Decoration Day", was adapted as a Hallmark Hall of Fame television special (1990), which was nominated for an Emmy and won a Christopher Award and a Golden Globe Award. The Collected Stories of John William Corrington was published in 1990, by the University of Missouri Press.

Centenary College inaugurated an award in his name in 1991.
