= Joyce Hooper Corrington =

American television and film writer (born 1936)

- Born: Joyce Elaine Hooper; August 5, 1936 (age 90); United States
- Occupation: Screenwriter
- Spouse: John William Corrington (m. 1960)
- Children: 4

Joyce Elaine Corrington (née Hooper; born August 5, 1936) is an American television and film writer. She was married to fellow soap-opera writer John William Corrington, who died in 1988.

== Career ==
In an interview on the Omega Man DVD she mentions that her first degree was in engineering and her PhD in chemistry. She was a professor in chemistry at Xavier University of Louisiana in 1978.

With her husband, she wrote five screenplays, Von Richthofen and Brown (1969), The Omega Man (1971), Boxcar Bertha (1971), The Arena (1972), and Battle for the Planet of the Apes (1973), and a television film, The Killer Bees (1974).

She served as Director of Research in Science and associate professor of chemistry at Xavier University of Louisiana, in New Orleans.

She co-created the short-lived soap opera Texas, along with her husband and a fellow soap-opera colleague, Paul Rauch. She wrote for other serials, including Search for Tomorrow, General Hospital, and One Life to Live. Her most recent position was as a producer and story editor for MTV's The Real World.

== Selected filmography ==
- The Omega Man - screenwriter (1971)
- Boxcar Bertha - screenwriter (1972)
- Texas - co-creator (with John William Corrington and Paul Rauch); co-Head Writer: 1980–1981
- Capitol - co-Head Writer: 1982–1983
- General Hospital - co-Head Writer: 1983
- One Life to Live - co-Head Writer: 1983
- Superior Court - co-Head Writer: 1987–1989
