= List of fictional chief petty officers =

Below is an alphabetical list of primarily fictional American chief petty officers and the actors who portrayed them in film and on television. This list is far from complete and requires more updating. Though the list is not comprehensive and may not meet current standards for an article, it is a good sampling of the various portrayals of the naval service's non-commissioned officer.

== B ==
- Chief Petty Officer Ned Bannon — (Played by Glenn Morshower in JAG (1995-2000))
- C.P.O. Beach — (Played by Don Dubbins in the "Rescue" episode of the Voyage to the Bottom of the Sea (1967)}
- Chief Bell — (Played by Mike Kellin in "The Thirty-Fathom Grave" episode of The Twilight Zone (1963)
- Chief Petty Officer Steve Boleslavski — (Played by Edward G. Robinson in Destroyer (1943))
- CPO Boyer — (Played by William Bendix in Submarine Command (1951))
- Chief Petty Officer Breeden — (Played by Drew Breeden in The Last Ship (TV series) (2014))
- Chief Max Bronsky — (Played by Henry Kulky in Hennesey (1959–62))
- Chief Budge — (Played by Steve Brodie in The Caine Mutiny (1954))

== C ==
- Chief — (Played by Adam Williams) in "The Sky Is Falling" episode of the Voyage to the Bottom of the Sea (1964)}
- Chief — (Played by Nick Chinlund in Below (2002))
- Chief — (Played by Darryl F. Zanuck in The Enemy Below (1957))
- Chief Bos'un — (Played by Jack Kenney in Battle Stations (1956))
- Chief Gunner's Mate — (Played by Eddy Chandler in Destroyer (1943))
- Chief Gunners Mate — (Played by Frank Sutton in Operation Pacific (1951))
- Chief of the Boat — (Played by Larry Ferguson in "The Hunt for Red October" (1990))
- Chief Petty Officer — (Played by Mike Kellin in The Wackiest Ship in the Army (1960))
- Chief Petty Officer — (Played by William F. Leicester in You're in the Navy Now (1951))
- Chief Pharmacist Mate — (Played by Frank Sinatra in None but the Brave (1965))
- C.P.O. Culpepper — (Played by Slim Pickens in In Harm's Way (1965))
- Chief Manilow Crocker — (Played by Royce D. Applegate in SeaQuest DSV(1993-4))

== D ==
- Chief Petty Officer Mickey Donohue — (Played by Glenn Ford in Destroyer (1943))
- Chief Petty Officer Dowdy — (Played by Ward Bond in Mister Roberts (1955))

== F ==
- Chief Jake Flannigan — (Played by Dana Andrews in The Frogmen (1951))
- CPO Andy Flowers — (Played by Steve Mitchell in Submarine Seahawk (1958))
- BMC Reginald Albert "Red" Forman - (Played by Kurtwood Smith in That 70's Show)

== G ==
- C.P.O. Garrison — (Played by Adam Roarke in Star Trek: Star Trek: The Cage (1964) (1986 VHS release date))
- Chief Gleason — (Played by Charles Tannen in Voyage to the Bottom of the Sea (1961))
- Chief "Gordy" Gordon — (Played by Claude Akins in The Sharkfighters (1956))
- CPO "Grif" Griffin — (Played by Bob Steele in The Atomic Submarine (1959))

== J ==
- Chief Boatswain's Mate Jenks — (Played by Chill Wills in Stand By for Action (1942))
- Chief Johnson — (Played by Peter Jason in Mister Roberts (1984))
- Chief Yeoman Henry Johnson — (Played by Walter Brennan in Stand by for Action (1942))
- Chief Petty Officer "Curly" Jones — (Played by Henry Kulky in Voyage to the Bottom of the Sea TV series (1964–65))

== K ==
- Senior Chief Drew Koehler - played by MA1 Koehler in the Chief's only Facebook Group.

== L ==
- CPO Lardoski — (Played by Robert Stauss in "Sailor Beware"' (1952))
- Chief Petty Officer Walter "The Beast" Lynch — (Played by John Tui in Battleship.

== M ==
- Chief Torpedo Man Mac Dougal — (Played by Eugene Pallette in Hell Below (1933))
- Chief Michael "Mike" Mallory — (Played by Pat O'Brien in The Navy Comes Through (1942))
- Chief Petty Officer Salvador Jesus Maravilla, USN — (Played by Leon Lontoc in The Gallant Hours (1960))
- Chief Mike "Mac" McDonnell — (Played by James Gleason in Crash Dive (1943))
- Chief Hospital Corpsman McKinley — (Played by Phil Brown in The Bedford Incident (1965))
- Chief Herbert Molumphrey — (Played by Wayne Long in Operation Petticoat TV Series (1977–78))
- Chief Torpedoman "Mo" Molumphry, USN, the Chief of the Boat — (Played by Gene Evans in Operation Petticoat (1959))
- Chief Phillip P. 'Pappy' Moran — (Played by Frank Faylen in "Away All Boats" (1956))
- 'Boats' Mulcahey C.B.M. — (Played by Ward Bond in "They Were Expendable" (1945))

== O ==
- Chief Miles O'Brien — (Played by Colm Meaney in Star Trek: The Next Generation (1987–94) and Star Trek: Deep Space Nine (1993–99))
- C.P.O 'Chief' O'Malley — (Played by Walter Brennan in Sea of Lost Ships (1953))

== P ==
- The Chief — (Played by Jack Pennick in Operation Pacific (1951))

== R ==
- Chief Petty Officer Roberts — (Played by Zach McGowan in "SEAL Team V" (2008))
- Chief Petty Officer Ruddle — (Played by Nathaniel Frey in Kiss Them for Me (1957))
- Chief Petty Officer Casey Ryback - (Played by Steven Seagal in the 1992 film Under Siege and its sequel, Under Siege 2: Dark Territory, in 1995)

== S ==
- CPO Corky Schmidt — (Played by Ron Masak in "Assault on the Wayne" (1971))
- Chief William Shan — (Played by Dustin Nguyen in SeaQuest DSV (1994) recurrent role))
- Chief Petty Officer Francis Ethelbert Sharkey — (Played by Terry Becker in Voyage to the Bottom of the Sea TV Series (1965–68))
- CPO Otto Sharkey — (Played by Don Rickles in C.P.O. Sharkey (1976–78))
- Chief Petty Officer Simpson — (Played by Tige Andrews in Gomer Pyle USMC (1965–69) recurrent role))

== T ==
- Chief Machinist's Mate Sam Tostin, USN — (Played by Arthur O'Connell in Operation Petticoat (1959))
- Chief Machinist's Mate Sam Tostin, USN — (Played by Jack Murdock in Operation Petticoat TV Series (1977–78))
- Chief of Boat Nathan Travers — (Played by William H. Macy in In Enemy Hands (2004))
- Ned Trumpet — (Played by Wallace Beery in This Man's Navy (1945))
- Chief Petty Officer Galen Tyrol — (Played by Aaron Douglas in Battlestar Galactica (2004))

== Y ==
- Chief Petty Officer York — (Played by Henry Kulky in Up Periscope (1959))
