= Gary W. Goldstein =

American film producer (born 1952)

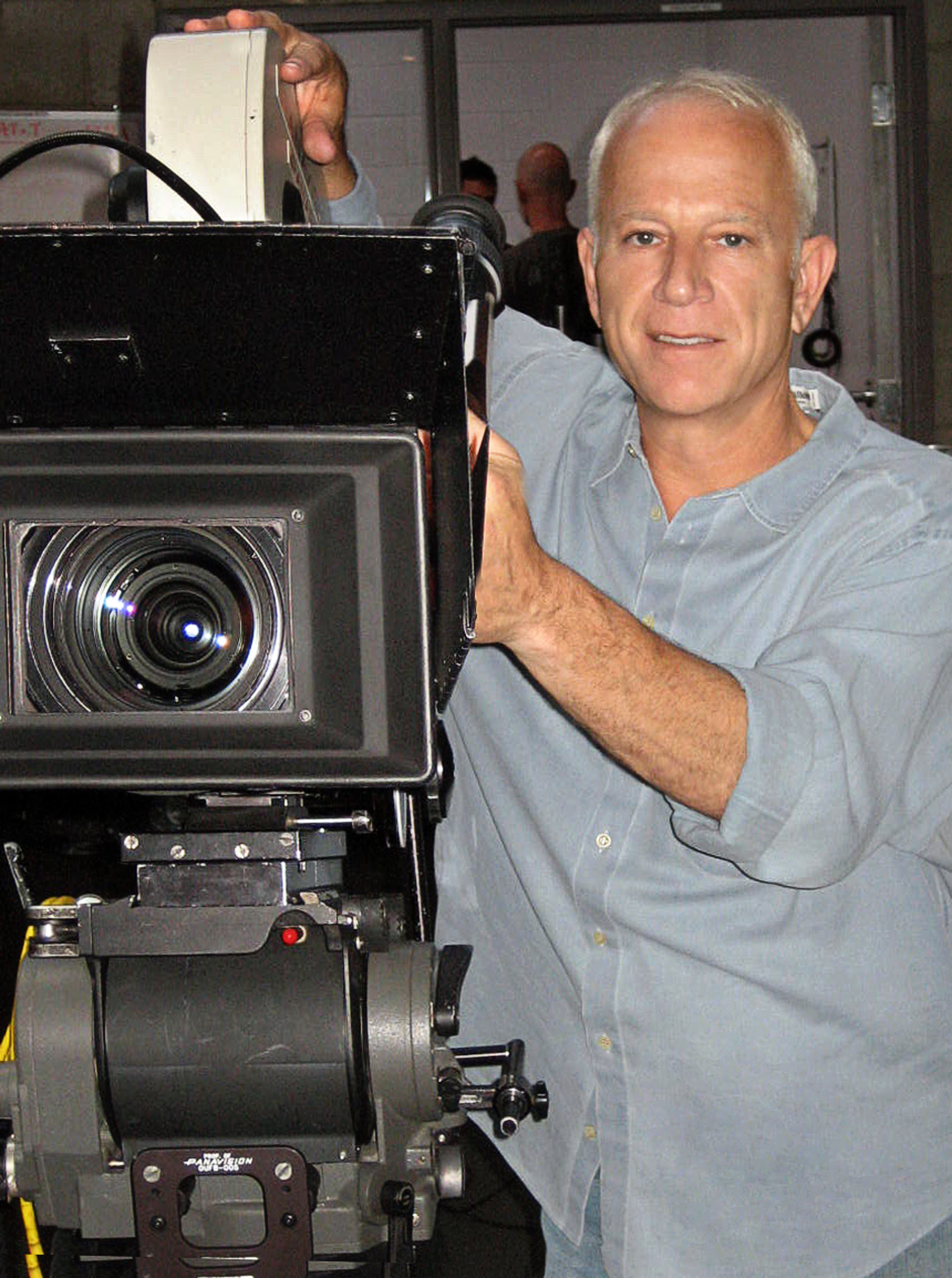
- Goldstein in 2008
- Born: Gary Wolff Goldstein; December 24, 1952 (age 73); The Bronx, New York
- Education: University of California, Berkeley (BA); Golden Gate University (JD)
- Occupations: Producer; Executive Producer
- Years active: 1981–present
- Website: www.garywgoldstein.com

Gary Wolff Goldstein (born December 24, 1952) is an American author, speaker, consultant and Hollywood film producer, best known for producing Pretty Woman, Under Siege, and The Mothman Prophecies and generating over a billion dollars in worldwide revenue.

He is the author of Conquering Hollywood: The Screenwriter’s Blueprint For Career Success, a successfully funded Kickstarter project, that serves as a road map for transforming talent as a writer into a successful career as a Hollywood screenwriter.

== Early life ==
Goldstein was born in Wantagh, New York and grew up in San Francisco, where he attended Lowell High School, a public magnet school. He went on to receive his undergraduate degree from University of California, Berkeley, followed by a JD at Golden Gate University School of Law.

== Career ==
=== Early career ===
As an A&R rep for Columbia Records while still an undergraduate at UC Berkeley, Gary was their youngest music exec at the time. Also, while an undergrad, Goldstein produced all the music concerts and cabarets for the Berkeley campus, featuring artists such as Joni Mitchell, The Steve Miller Band, Chuck Berry, Phil Ochs and others. In 1981, he moved to Los Angeles to pursue a career in Hollywood as a literary manager and film producer.

=== Mainstream breakthrough ===
In 1983, after his initial film venture lost $80,000 on its opening weekend, Goldstein met 23-year-old Jonathan Lawton, who was earning a living as a software beta tester and programmer. Goldstein hired Lawton to set-up his Apple MacIntosh computer, which had to be programmed from scratch. For three weeks, Lawton visited Goldstein's Hollywood office and programmed his computer, while Goldstein shared with Lawton the ins and outs of his work as a literary manager. The two slowly became friends and one day, Lawton revealed he was a writer, had dropped out of film school and had already written a half-dozen screenplays, that were all unread. Goldstein requested to read some of Lawton's work, and by the third script, Goldstein recognized Lawton's talent.

Goldstein asked Lawton to write a fresh story that he could use to introduce Lawton's writing talent to producers and studios. Goldstein requested a classic romance with irresistible male and female lead roles, using a one-week clock so the story would take place over a tight time frame, giving the final caveat that the story had to have real power—Goldstein wanted it written from a deeply personal life experience.

Lawton had just ended a significant relationship and lived in a tiny studio in a rough part of Los Angeles, on an alley that looked out on a steady stream of pimps, prostitutes, drug dealers, homeless and police. A few weeks later, Lawton turned in a first draft of a new script titled Three Thousand, which would later become Pretty Woman. The film would take several years to reach theaters, morphing from a dark drama with a devastating ending to one of the most successful romantic comedies of all time, becoming the highest grossing live action film for Walt Disney Studios.

== Filmography ==
=== Feature films ===
Year	Film	Awards and Nominations
1989	Cannibal Women in the Avocado Jungle of Death	
1990	Pretty Woman	People's Choice Awards Winner—Favorite Comedy Motion Picture; Nominated—Golden Globe Award for Best Picture; Nominated—J. F. Lawton—British Academy Film Awards—Best Original Screenplay; Nominated—Arnon Milchan et al.—British Academy Film Awards—Best Film
1991	Pizza Man	
1992	Under Siege	Nominated—Academy Awards—Best Sound Effects Editing; Nominated—Academy Awards—Best Sound
1995	Under Siege 2: Dark Territory	
1995	The Hunted	
1998	Ringmaster	
2002	The Mothman Prophecies	Winner—Motion Picture Sound Editors Best Sound Editing: Music in a Feature Film

== Books ==
- Stickability (Napoleon Hill Foundation)—Contributing Author
- Conquering Hollywood: The Screenwriter’s Blueprint For Career Success—Author

== Talks ==
- Gary Goldstein at TEDxLaJolla
- Gary Goldstein at The Great American Pitchfest
