= Cannibal Women in the Avocado Jungle of Death =

1988 film by J. F. Lawton

- VHS cover
- Directed by: J. F. Lawton
- Written by: J. F. Lawton
- Produced by: Gary W. Goldstein
- Starring: Bill Maher; Shannon Tweed; Adrienne Barbeau
- Cinematography: Robert Knouse
- Edited by: King Louis; King Wilder
- Music by: Carl Dante
- Distributed by: Paramount Home Video (North America); CIC Video (International)
- Release date: March 15, 1989
- Running time: 90 minutes
- Country: United States
- Language: English

Cannibal Women in the Avocado Jungle of Death is a 1989 American comedy film directed by J. F. Lawton and starring Shannon Tweed and Bill Maher. The film sends up many pop culture motifs and societal trends, including feminism (and feminist movements' fragmentation around various issues), B movies (particularly Cannibal Holocaust), celebrities, major writers and political figures, centered around a spoof of Joseph Conrad's 1899 novel Heart of Darkness. It was the first feature directed (under the pseudonym J. D. Athens) by screenwriter J. F. Lawton, who also authored Pretty Woman, Under Siege and its sequel, and television show V.I.P.

== Plot ==
The U.S. government grows worried for the nation's avocado supply after some confrontations with the "Piranha" tribe of cannibal women, who live in the mysterious "Avocado Jungle" (westernmost outpost: San Bernardino) and ritually sacrifice and eat men. The government recruits Margo Hunt (Tweed), a professor of feminist studies at a local university called "Spritzer College" (a reference to Pitzer College but filmed at University of California, Riverside), to travel into the Avocado Jungle and make contact with the women to attempt to convince them to move to a reservation/condo in Malibu. Along the way, she and her travelling companions — male chauvinist guide Jim (Maher) and ditzy undergraduate Bunny (Karen Mistal) — meet a tribe of subservient men called the "Donnahew" (a reference to talk-show host Phil Donahue) and face dangers in their path.

Eventually, the trio (Margo, Bunny and Jim) meets the Piranha women, who have recently taken Dr. Kurtz (played by Adrienne Barbeau) as their "empress." Kurtz is Dr. Hunt's former colleague in feminist studies (the internationally famous author of Smart Women, Stupid Insensitive Men) and now her nemesis; she has joined the tribe of Piranha women with her own exploitative agenda. The two argue about the morality of sacrificing men and the exploitation of the Piranha women, and Bunny decides to join the tribe, her first sacrifice being Jim. Bunny cannot go through with the kill, however, and Dr. Hunt escapes, aided by the handsome, intelligent, and sensitive Jean-Pierre (Brett Stimely), who also was to be sacrificed.

Dr. Margo Hunt finds in the jungle a rival tribe of cannibal women, the Barracuda Women, who are at war with the Piranha women due to differences over which condiment (guacamole or clam dip) most appropriately accompanies a meal of sacrificed man. Hunt returns to the Piranha stronghold with this other tribe and rescues Bunny and Jim as well as Jean-Pierre.

Margo Hunt challenges Kurtz to a duel for supremacy, and they argue while fighting with various weapons; eventually, Margo impales Kurtz with a fencing sword. Kurtz explains her motives to Hunt in her last words: After ruling the Piranha tribe, she cannot return to civilization and the talk-show circuit. She then kills herself by plunging into a pit filled with water and piranha fish.

Having discovered the government plot to domesticate the Piranha women by providing aerobics classes and frequent exposure to Cosmopolitan magazine, Hunt refuses to bring the Piranha women with her, and instead persuades the warring cannibal tribes to reunite, maintaining the peace by means of consciousness raising groups.

The film ends happily for the trio of main characters: Bunny and Jim are to be married, and Jean-Pierre has enrolled at Dr. Hunt's university as a feminist studies major, becoming in the process the ideal companion for Hunt.

== Cast ==
- Bill Maher as Jim
- Shannon Tweed as Dr. Margo Hunt
- Adrienne Barbeau as Dr. Francine Kurtz
- Karen Mistal as Bunny
- Barry Primus as Ford Maddox
- Jim McKrell as Dean Stockwell
- Pat Crawford Brown as The Secretary

== Release ==
Cannibal Women in the Avocado Jungle of Death was released on home video on March 15, 1989.

== Reception ==
From contemporary reviews, "Lor." of Variety found the film "pack some good laughs (and bad puns) but is unfortunately underproduced, giving Paramount Video an okay rental item."

Retrospective reviews include The Digital Fix's reviewer, who wrote:

Cannibal Women is [a] pretty smart picture, with Lawton's screenplay among its major qualities ... He's also fairly shrewd when it comes to the casting with Tweed (shortly before her move into 'erotic thriller' territory) capturing just the right tongue-in-cheek tone and Barbeau lending the requisite cult appeal. Mistal also acquits herself well — as you would expect from someone with the experience of Return of the Killer Tomatoes behind them — whilst Lawton also had the inspired idea of putting his pal Bill Maher in the male hero role.

TV Guide granted the movie 2 out of 4 stars: "This film is not nearly as bad as it might have been, thanks largely to the leads. Moreover, CANNIBAL WOMEN does manage to be on target with its humor from time to time. But there are far more misses than hits as the movie also goes for the corny, the obvious, and the ancient."

Julian White of Starburst (a British science fiction magazine), rated the movie 6 out of 10 stars, calling it "a light-hearted romp" and saying, "It's all unashamedly joky and facetious, but also very likeable. The look of the film is rough and ready ... Even the biggest fans of this film would have to admit that director J. F. Lawton is unlikely to go down in history as one of cinema's great visual stylists. That said, he's a very capable screenwriter (as he subsequently demonstrated by penning such perennial favourites as Pretty Woman and Under Siege), and there are some surprisingly sophisticated one-liners lurking among the slapstick. True, the constant ribbing at feminists now seems very dated, but it's never mean-spirited, and anyway the girls give as good as they get."
