= Debra Jo Rupp =

American actress (born 1951)

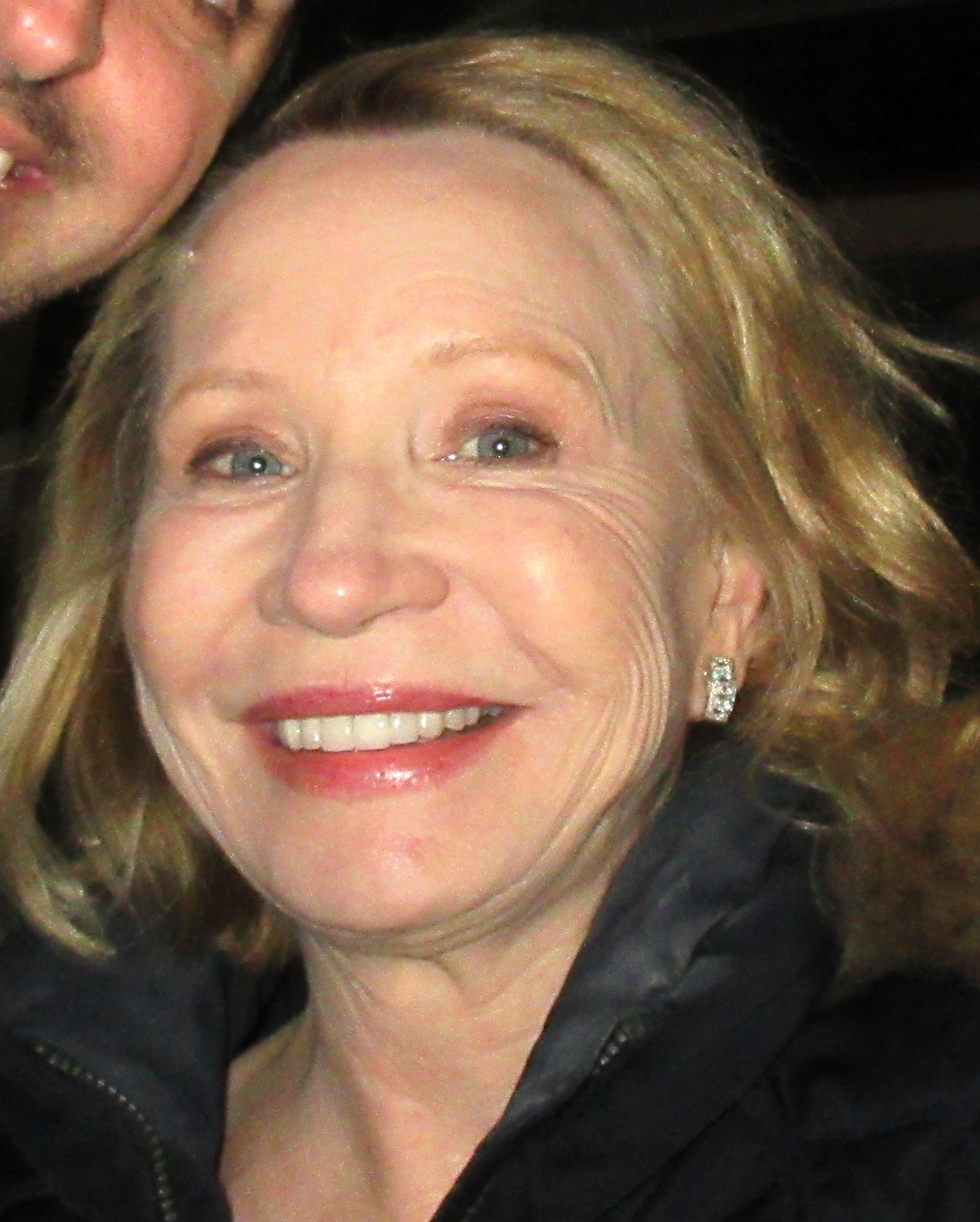
- Rupp in 2019
- Born: February 24, 1951 (age 75)
- Education: University of Rochester
- Occupation: Actress
- Years active: 1980–present

Debra Jo Rupp (born February 24, 1951) is an American actress. She is best known for her starring role as Kitty Forman in the Fox sitcom That '70s Show (1998–2006) and its Netflix sequel series That '90s Show (2023–2024). Rupp also had roles in the NBC sitcom Friends (1997–1998), the ABC animated series Teacher's Pet (2000–2002) and its 2004 sequel film, the ABC sitcom Better with You (2010–2011), and the Disney+ miniseries WandaVision (2021) and its spin-off Agatha All Along (2024).

Rupp appeared in the comedy films Big (1988), Death Becomes Her (1992), Sgt. Bilko (1996), Garfield: The Movie (2004), and She's Out of My League (2010). She also starred as sex therapist Dr. Ruth Westheimer in the plays Dr. Ruth, All the Way (2012) and Becoming Dr. Ruth (2013), the latter of which earned her a nomination for the Drama Desk Award for Outstanding Solo Performance. She starred as Della in the play The Cake (2017–2019), for which she was nominated for the Drama League Award for Distinguished Performance.

== Early life and education ==
Rupp was raised in Boxford, Massachusetts, where she attended Masconomet Regional High School, graduating in 1969.

== Career ==
=== 1980s ===
Rupp left Massachusetts in 1979 to pursue an acting career in New York City. She frequently performed on stage and appeared in commercials before winning her first television role in 1980 as Sheila, a topless dancer, on the daytime drama All My Children. Earlier the same year, Rupp played Helen, the wife of a cheating husband, in Sharon Tipsword's one-act comedy Second Verse, produced as part of a play festival at New York's Nat Horne Theatre.

Another notable stage performance was as the young bride Eleanor in the 1985 production of A. R. Gurney's The Middle Ages at the Whole Theater Company, established by Olympia Dukakis in Montclair, New Jersey.

She garnered praise from Walter Goodman in a New York Times review of one of her many off-Broadway performances: as June Yeager, a young wife who feels she is never "loved enough", in the 1986 York Theater Company production of Arthur Laurents' dramatic play, The Time of the Cuckoo staged at the Church of the Heavenly Rest in New York City's Upper East Side.

Rupp's list of stage credits includes appearances in Terrence McNally's Frankie and Johnny in the Clair de Lune and Cynthia Heimel's A Girl's Guide to Chaos, the Broadway role which propelled her career forward. She originated the role of Cynthia in 1986, a character based on Heimel's observations made during her stints as a columnist for Playboy and The Village Voice. Directed by Wynn Handman, and sharing the stage with Rita Jenrette, Rupp's performance as Cynthia was immortalized by legendary caricaturist Al Hirschfeld and described in a New York Times review as "an appealing mixture of pluck and pathos". In his review of Chaos, New York Newsday theater critic Allan Wallach called Rupp "a real find".

In early 1987, Rupp was featured in an article written by Enid Nemy for the "Broadway" section of The New York Times. Entitled "New York is beckoning, but first, Los Angeles", the interview revealed how Rupp's success in the theater so soon after her arrival in New York City had scared the young actress enough to take time off from acting for several years. When she returned to the stage, Rupp explained in the article, she was often cast as an ingénue; however, after her portrayal of Cynthia in Chaos, she began getting calls to audition in Los Angeles for "really crazy neurotic" parts in television pilots. Rupp was realistic about the unpredictability of an acting career and, since she had promised her mother she would never wait tables when she left for New York, she stated that she had not given up her part-time work as a bookkeeper and was "learning computers" as something to fall back on.

Rupp continued to devote herself to acting full-time through the 1980s, and performed in numerous regional stage productions. One such production was Sherry Kramer's Wall of Water in New Haven, Connecticut, at the Yale Repertory Theatre's Winterfest play festival of 1988. She guest-starred on numerous television shows, including Kate & Allie, Spenser for Hire, and The Days and Nights of Molly Dodd. In 1988, Rupp landed her first feature-film role as Miss Patterson, the timid secretary of Tom Hanks' Josh Baskin, in the comedy Big.

=== 1990s ===
In 1990, Rupp returned to New York City to perform in a Broadway stage production of Cat on a Hot Tin Roof with Kathleen Turner at the Eugene O'Neill Theatre. In it, Rupp portrayed Mae (Sister Woman). Her television work during the early 1990s included recurring roles as Ms. Higgins on the television series Davis Rules with Randy Quaid, and as Sister Mary Incarnata on Phenom with Judith Light, as well as guest roles on Blossom, Family Matters, L.A. Law, and ER.

In 1995, she began her stint as Jeff Foxworthy's sister-in-law Gayle on The Jeff Foxworthy Show, appeared in the science fiction miniseries The Invaders with Scott Bakula, portrayed Jerry Seinfeld's annoying booking agent Katie on an episode of Seinfeld (a role she reprised in 1996), and performed on stage as Meg in Broken Bones, a dark drama about spousal abuse by Drew McWeeny and Scott Swan, as part of a one-act play festival at Hollywood's Met Theater. She provided the voice of Lana Lionheart in the "MGM Sing-Alongs" Videos in 1997. Also in 1997, Rupp appeared as the office manager in the 1997 independent film Clockwatchers, co-starring Lisa Kudrow, Parker Posey, and Toni Colette.

Rupp appeared in several episodes of Friends as Alice Knight, a home economics teacher who fell in love with and married Phoebe Buffay's (Lisa Kudrow) much younger half-brother, Frank Jr. (Giovanni Ribisi). In 1998, she began portraying Kitty Forman in the comedy series, That '70s Show. She also portrayed Marilyn See, wife of astronaut Elliot See, in episode 11 of the Emmy Award-winning television miniseries From the Earth to the Moon, produced by Tom Hanks and directed by Sally Field.

=== 2000s ===
She lent her voice as the character of Mrs. Helperman in Disney's animated series Teacher's Pet in 2000, and again for the 2004 movie version. She starred as a stand-up comic with a secret in the independent short film The Act, directed by Susan Kraker and Pi Ware, an official selection at the Sundance Film Festival which won several awards at film festivals around the world. In 2004, she played Brad Hunt's nagging mother in Lucky 13, a full-length independent film starring Lauren Graham. She returned to All My Children for one episode in December 2005, playing a homeless woman named Victoria.

Rupp has often returned to Massachusetts and New York to appear in regional and off-Broadway stage productions. In 2004, she played Dotty Otley in Michael Frayn's Noises Off at the Cape Playhouse in Dennis, Massachusetts. In 2006, she appeared on stage in Pittsfield, Massachusetts, as a kooky mother in French playwright Jean Anouilh's comedy Ring Round the Moon at Barrington Stage Company.

New York theater-goers saw Rupp return to the off-Broadway stage in June 2007 as Valerie in the Second Stage Theatre production of Marisa Wegrzyn's The Butcher of Baraboo, directed by Judith Ivey. Two months later, she performed in the Berkshire Theatre Festival in Stockbridge, Massachusetts, as Ida Bolton in a revival of Paul Osborn's 1939 play, Morning's at Seven.

After That '70s Show ended in 2006, Rupp appeared in a dramatic television role as the wife of a murdered pharmaceutical CEO on the crime drama Law & Order: Special Victims Unit. In the episode, entitled "Infiltrated", Rupp's character desperately attempts to hide her slain husband's past sexual abuses. In early 2007, the feature film Kickin' It Old Skool was released, in which Rupp was cast as Jamie Kennedy's mother. In 2008, she appeared as a restaurant owner who helps two homeless men in the comedy-drama-musical, Jackson, written and directed by J. F. Lawton. In the same year, she returned to daytime television in a guest role on As the World Turns.

Massachusetts theater-goers saw Rupp onstage in 2008 playing Olympia in Georges Feydeau's 1907 farce A Flea in Her Ear at the Williamstown Theatre Festival in Williamstown, and as Miss Maudie in To Kill a Mockingbird at the Barrington Stage Company in Pittsfield. In 2012, Rupp portrayed Ruth in She Wants Me, an independent romantic comedy.

=== 2010s–present ===
In June and July 2012, Rupp starred as Dr. Ruth Westheimer in Dr. Ruth – All the Way on the St. Germain Stage of the Barrington Stage Company. The play showcased a sex therapist's life, from fleeing the Nazis in the Kindertransport and joining the Haganah in Jerusalem as a scout and sniper, to her struggles to succeed as a single mother coming to America. Rupp reprised the role Off-Broadway in Becoming Dr. Ruth, for which she was nominated for the 2014 Drama Desk Award for Outstanding Solo Performance.

In 2021, Rupp joined the limited television series WandaVision as Mrs. Hart (aka Sharon Davis), Wanda and Vision's neighbor, and reprised her role in the spin-off series, Agatha All Along.

That '90s Show, a spin-off from That '70s Show, saw Rupp return as Kitty Forman. The first series was filmed in 2022 and released in early 2023.

== Personal life ==
She has two homes, one in Lee, Massachusetts, where she stays when she is doing theatrical projects in New York, and another one in Los Angeles, where she stays during television and film projects. She said in an interview that she is a Methodist.

== Acting credits ==
=== Film ===
Debra Jo Rupp film credits
Year	Title	Role	Notes
1988	Big	Miss Patterson	
1988	Robots	R. Jane	Direct-to-video
1992	Death Becomes Her	Psychiatric Patient	
1996	Sgt. Bilko	Mrs. Hall	
1997	MGM Sing-Alongs: Searching for Your Dreams	Lana Lionheart	Short film; voice role
1997	MGM Sing-Alongs: Having Fun	Lana Lionheart	Short film; voice role
1997	MGM Sing-Alongs: Friends	Lana Lionheart	Short film; voice role
1997	MGM Sing-Alongs: Being Happy	Lana Lionheart	Short film; voice role
1997	Clockwatchers	Barbara	
1998	Senseless	Fertility Clinic Assistant	
2004	Teacher's Pet	Mrs. Mary Lou Moira Angela Darling Helperman	Voice role
2004	Garfield	Mom Rat	Voice role
2004	The Act	Rosy Marconi	Short film
2005	Lucky 13	Mrs. Baker	
2006	Spymate	Edith	
2006	Air Buddies	Belinda	Direct-to-video; voice role
2007	Kickin' It Old Skool	Sylvia Schumacher	
2008	Jackson	Nice Lady	
2010	She's Out of My League	Mrs. Kettner	
2011	Spooky Buddies	Zelda	Direct-to-video; voice role
2012	She Wants Me	Ruth Baum	
2012	Congratulations	Nancy Riley	
2013	Super Buddies	Cow	Direct-to-video; voice role
2014	The Opposite of Sex	Tracy	
2019	Fair Market Value	Carol Coogan	
2019	The Social Ones	Sheila Berger	

=== Television ===
Debra Jo Rupp television credits
Year	Title	Role	Notes
1987	Spenser: For Hire	Helen	Episode: "Gone Fishin'"
1987	Kate & Allie	Toy Store Clerk	Episode: "The Nightmare Before Christmas"
1988	The Equalizer	Marge	Episode: "Regrets Only"
1988	The Days and Nights of Molly Dodd	Waitress	Episode: "Here's What Happened to That Earring You Lost"
1989	Mothers, Daughters and Lovers	Lottie	Television film
1989	Newhart	Irene Sadler	Episode: "Ramblin' Michael Harris"
1990	Grand	Cheryl Ann	Episode: "The Pretty Good Mother"
1991	Davis Rules	Ms. Higgins	Recurring role
1991	Civil Wars	Florence Herrigan	Episode: "Have Gun, Will Unravel"
1991–1994	Empty Nest	Danielle / Dr. Simmons / Claire	3 episodes
1992	A Woman Scorned: The Betty Broderick Story	Alice	Television film
1992	Blossom	Lucy Robinson	2 episodes
1992	Great Scott!	Sally O'Donnell	Episode: "Stripe Gripe"
1993	Family Matters	Miss Connors	Episode: "It's a Mad, Mad, Mad House"
1993	Evening Shade	Mrs. Holloway	Episode: "Teaching Is a Good Thing"
1993	In the Line of Duty: Ambush in Waco	Dorrie	Television film
1993	The Odd Couple: Together Again	Plaza Asst. Manager	Television film
1993	L.A. Law	Gretchen Tomba	Episode: "Pacific Rimshot"
1993–1994	Phenom	Sister Mary Incarnata	Recurring role
1994	MacShane: Winner Takes All	Alice	Television film
1994	The Adventures of Brisco County, Jr.	Ms. Plowright	Episode: "Stagecoach"
1994	MacShane: The Final Roll of the Dice	Alice	Television film
1994	Hearts Afire	Brenda Swain	2 episodes
1994	Diagnosis: Murder	Dr. Nora Stebbings	Episode: "The Busy Body"
1995	The Office	Beth Avery	6 episodes
1995	ER	Mrs. Dibble	Episode: "Men Plan, God Laughs"
1995	If Not for You	Eileen	Recurring role
1995	The Invaders	Rita	2 episodes
1995–1996	Seinfeld	Katie	2 episodes
1995–1996	The Jeff Foxworthy Show	Gayle	Recurring role
1996	High Incident		2 episodes
1996	Caroline in the City	Melody	Episode: "Caroline and the Red Sauce"
1997	Crisis Center	Marilyn	4 episodes
1997	7th Heaven	June McKinley	Episode: "See You in September"
1997	Touched by an Angel	Mayor Risa Hoigard	Episode: "Jones vs. God"
1997	Over the Top	Rose	Episode: "Pilot"
1997–1998	Friends	Alice Knight Buffay	Recurring role; 6 episodes
1998	From the Earth to the Moon	Marilyn See	Mini-series
1998	To Have and To Hold	Margaret Jarrod	Episode: "Pilot"
1998–2006	That '70s Show	Kitty Forman	Main role
2000–2002	Teacher's Pet	Ms. Mary Lou Moira Angela Darling Helperman	Recurring role; voice role
2001	The Hughleys	Karen Clark	Episode: "Daddy's Lil' Girl"
2004	The Tracy Morgan Show	Ms. Laneworthy	2 episodes
2005	Robot Chicken	Kitty Forman	Episode: "Gold Dust Gasoline"; voice role
2005	All My Children	Victoria	Episode: #1.9266
2006	Law & Order: Special Victims Unit	Debra Hartnell	Episode: "Infiltrated"
2008	As the World Turns	Edna Winklemeyer	Recurring role
2010–2011	Better with You	Vicky Putney	Main role
2013	Hart of Dixie	Besty Maynard	Episode: "Where I Lead Me"
2014	Cuz-Bros	Merle	Television film
2015	He's With Me	Alice Adams	2 episodes
2016	Pearl	DeeDee	Television film
2017	Elementary	Sheriff Malik	Episode: "Crowned Clown, Downtown Brown"
2017	NCIS: Los Angeles	Ginger	Episode: "Old Tricks"
2017–2018	This Is Us	Linda	4 episodes
2017–2020	The Ranch	Janice Phillips	Recurring role
2018	I Feel Bad	Griff's Mom	Episode: "My Kid Has to Grow Up"
2019	Grey's Anatomy	Jo's Therapist	Episode: "Nothing Left to Cling To"
2020	At Home with Amy Sedaris	Belinda Thornberry	Episode: "Valentine's Day"
2021	WandaVision	Sharon Davis / "Mrs. Hart"	Recurring role
2021	Marvel Studios: Assembled	Herself	Documentary; The Making of WandaVision"
2023–2024	That '90s Show	Kitty Forman	Main cast; also executive producer
2024	Agatha All Along	Sharon Davis / "Mrs. Hart"	Main cast; 5 episodes; also contributed to soundtrack
2025	Bearbrick	Miss Milton	2 episodes; voice role

=== Stage ===
Debra Jo Rupp stage credits
Year	Title	Role	Venue	Notes
1985	The Middle Ages	Eleanor	The Whole Theater	
1986	The Time of the Cuckoo	June Yeager	York Theatre Company	
1987	A Girl's Guide To Chaos	Cynthia	American Place Theater	
1988	The Wall of Water	Meg	Yale Repertory Theatre	
1990	Cat on a Hot Tin Roof	Mae Pollitt	Eugene O'Neill Theatre	Broadway debut
2004	Noises Off	Dotty Otley	Cape Playhouse	
2006	Ring Round the Moon	Josephine	Barrington Stage Company	
2007	The Butcher of Baraboo	Valerie	Second Stage Theater	
2007	Morning's at Seven	Ida	Berkshire Theatre Festival	
2008	A Flea in Her Ear	Olympia	Williamstown Theatre Festival	
2008	To Kill A Mockingbird	Miss Maudie	Barrington Stage Company	
2009	True West	Mom	Williamstown Theatre Festival	
2012	Dr. Ruth, All the Way	Dr. Ruth Westheimer	Barrington Stage Company	
2013	Becoming Dr. Ruth	Dr. Ruth Westheimer	TheaterWorks Hartford	
2013	Becoming Dr. Ruth	Dr. Ruth Westheimer	Westside Theatre	Drama Desk Award for Outstanding Solo Performance (nomination) Outer Critics Circle Award for Outstanding Solo Performance (nomination)
2014	Annapurna	Emma	TheaterWorks Hartford	
2016	Kimberly Akimbo	Kimberly Levaco	Barrington Stage Company	
2016	Love Letters	Melissa Gardner	Barrington Stage Company	
2017	The Cake	Della	The Echo Theater Company	Los Angeles Drama Critics Circle Award: Lead Performance Ovation Award: Lead Actress in a Play
2018	The Cake	Della	Barrington Stage Company	
2018	The Cake	Della	Geffen Playhouse	
2019	The Cake	Della	Manhattan Theatre Club	Drama League Award for Distinguished Performance (nomination)
2019	Time Flies and Other Comedies	Performer	Barrington Stage Company	
2020	Three Viewings	Performer	Barrington Stage Company	Virtual stage reading
2021	Boca	Susan	Barrington Stage Company	
2024	Boeing Boeing	Berthe	Barrington Stage Company	
2026	Driving Miss Daisy	Daisy Werthan	Palm Beach Dramaworks	
2026	Driving Miss Daisy	Daisy Werthan	Barrington Stage Company	
