= The Hunted (1995 film) =

1995 thriller film by J. F. Lawton

- Theatrical release poster
- Directed by: J. F. Lawton
- Written by: J. F. Lawton
- Produced by: John Davis; Gary W. Goldstein
- Starring: Christopher Lambert; John Lone; Joan Chen
- Cinematography: Jack Conroy
- Edited by: Robert A. Ferretti; Eric Strand
- Music by: Kodō
- Production companies: Bregman/Baer Productions, Inc. Davis Entertainment
- Distributed by: Universal Pictures
- Release date: February 24, 1995
- Running time: 111 minutes
- Countries: United States; France
- Languages: English; Japanese
- Budget: $25 million
- Box office: $6.6 million (USA)

The Hunted is a 1995 martial arts action-thriller film written and directed by J. F. Lawton in his mainstream directorial debut, and starring Christopher Lambert, John Lone, Joan Chen, Yoshio Harada and Yoko Shimada. Lambert plays Paul Racine, an American businessman who by accident earns the wrath of a modern-day ninja clan in Japan.

The film was shot in Nagoya, Japan, and Vancouver, British Columbia, Canada on a $25 million budget, and premiered in February 1995, taking in $6.6 million in U.S. box office. Most critic reviews found the plot clichéd and the acting unconvincing, while some praised Harada's performance. The critically well-received soundtrack featured music by the Japanese taiko troupe Kodō, which pervades the film.

== Plot ==
Paul Racine, a tech executive from New York City, is on a business trip to Nagoya. He meets a woman, Kirina, in the hotel lounge, and they have a one-night stand. After they part ways, Kirina is approached by Kinjo and two henchmen. Kinjo is the leader of the Makato cult, an organization of ninja assassins that was hired to kill her. He boasts that no one has seen his face and lived. Kirina shows no fear of dying, so he grants her final wish to show her his face. Racine returns, looking for his room key, and tries to defend Kirina, but he is late. Kinjo decapitates her as his men stab Racine, hit him with a poisoned shuriken and cut his throat, leaving him for dead.

Racine awakens in a hospital room, but his claims of his encounter with ninjas are met with disbelief by the police. Lieutenant Wadakura dismisses the allegation and suspects that the murder is the work of a yakuza syndicate. Racine is approached by Ijuro Takeda, an expert on the cult and on Kinjo. Takeda claims Racine's life is in danger as he has seen Kinjo's face. Racine also finds out that Takeda is the last in a samurai line and has a feud with Kinjo. The ninjas attempt to finish Racine off at the hospital, killing several hospital staff and police officers, including Wadakura, but he escapes. Takeda and his wife Mieko subsequently take him to their family's stronghold, located on an island several hundred miles away. Leaving the city, Takeda secretly uses Racine as bait to draw Kinjo out, leading to a battle on the train where several passenger cars of innocent people are slaughtered by the ninjas. Takeda and Mieko kill the attackers, but discover that Kinjo did not take part in the assault. The ninjas' leader was Junko, Kinjo's lover; her death increases Kinjo's motivation to kill Racine and Takeda.

During the boat ride to the island, Mieko explains the history of the conflict between the two clans and the samurai concepts of courage and honor to Racine. On the island, Racine spends time with the drunken bladesmith Oshima, who is constructing a katana for Takeda. Despite the language barrier, the old man teaches him about smithing and swordsmanship. Meanwhile, Kinjo decides to find out who hired his clan to murder Kirina. The man he finds, Nemura, is a powerful yakuza figure who bought Kirina from her uncle, a pimp, then ordered her death when she left him after years of servitude. Disgusted that he killed an innocent woman over such a petty grievance, Kinjo kills the man.

Three weeks after Kirina's death, Takeda's new sword is ready, and Racine's injuries have healed. Takeda arrives at the island and is dismayed to find that Oshima has been training Racine. He humiliates Racine in a friendly duel. When Racine announces that he wants to leave the island and return home to New York, Takeda has him imprisoned and alerts Kinjo of his whereabouts. Hordes of ninjas arrive, overwhelming Takeda's inexperienced samurai, but Takeda gets the duel with Kinjo he wanted. Kinjo is victorious, stabbing Takeda through the torso; Takeda in turn stabs Kinjo in the leg, but soon dies.

As Kinjo is about to kill a helpless Mieko he is caught off-guard by Racine, whom Oshima had released on Mieko's instructions. Racine stabs Kinjo in the right shoulder, hurting his dominant arm. However, he is armed with only a sword he barely knows how to use. With his newfound skills and assistance from Mieko, Racine manages to decapitate Kinjo. Oshima then arrives in battle gear, and is annoyed to find all the ninjas dead. Racine, Mieko, and Oshima walk up the hill toward the family castle.

== Cast ==
- Christopher Lambert as Paul Racine
- John Lone as Kinjo
- Joan Chen as Kirina
- Yoshio Harada as Ijuro Takeda
- Yoko Shimada as Mieko Takeda
- Mari Natsuki as Junko
- Masumi Okada as Lieutenant Wadakura
- Takayuki Kubota as Oshima
- Tatsuya Irie as Hiryu
- Michael Warren as Chase
- Bart Anderson as John
- James Saito as Nemura
- Seth Sakai as Dr. Otozo Yamura
- Toshishiro Obata as Ryuma
- Ken Kensei as Sujin
- Hiroyasu Takagi as Misato
- Hiro Kanagawa as Lieutenant Sugimoto
- Michio Itano as Sumato
- Naoko Sasaki as Officer Naoko

== Production ==
The film was J.F. Lawton's mainstream directorial debut; he had earlier directed two low-budget films under a pseudonym. The Hunted had been one of his early scripts, written before he found success in Hollywood as the screenwriter of Pretty Woman (1990) and Under Siege (1992). On a budget of $25 million, the film was shot in Japan and Canada in the period from April 23 to June 30, 1994. The establishing shots were filmed in Nagoya, Japan, during the first two weeks of principal photography. The rest of the film was shot in Vancouver area. Indoor scenes were filmed in two local film studios, while outdoor locations included Queen Elizabeth Park and Lynn Canyon Park. The bullet train fight scene was shot in The Bridge Studios in Burnaby near Vancouver, using three train cars constructed specifically for the film.

== Release ==
The Hunted was released on February 24, 1995. The film took in $2.7 million on its opening weekend, ultimately grossing $6,609,661 in the United States (approx$. 14 million in 2025 dollars). It was rated R in the US, and received an 18 certificate in the UK. The film was released on VHS the same year by MCA-Universal Home Video, and on DVD in 1998 by Universal Studios Home Entertainment. The DVD bonus content included production notes, short biographies of Lambert, Lone, Chen and Lawton, and the theatrical trailer. Filmsondisc.com gave the DVD transfer a grade of A−, calling it "ravishing". A limited edition of 1,000 copies featuring a Region B Blu-ray and a DVD of the film was released on July 7, 2016, in Germany by Koch Media. Shout! Factory released the film on Blu-ray on May 21, 2019.

== Reception ==
On the review aggregator website Rotten Tomatoes, 8% of 13 critics' reviews are positive.

Michael Wilmington of Chicago Tribune gave The Hunted one star out of four, expressing dislike of Frenchman Lambert being cast as an American and Hong Kong native Lone playing a Japanese character. He derided the plot, calling the film "shameless". Variety compared the film to low-budget martial arts films, claiming that the film will perform best in the home video release. The reviewer, Brian Lowry, found the film loaded with clichés and the lead actors unconvincing. Stephen Hunter, writing for Baltimore Sun, thought that Takeda was the only character that stood out, saying that director Lawton "clearly saw The Seven Samurai one time too many." Mick LaSalle for San Francisco Chronicle deemed the film "absurd and overlong", saying it was not afforded a press screening "so as not to make the Friday papers", but thought that the humor and the tour de force style might save the film.

William Grimes for The New York Times called it "a slightly better than adequate B thriller", adding that "within limits [...] the film delivers." He commented positively on the taiko drum soundtrack by Kodō. Paul Shirey, writing in retrospect for JoBlo.com, saw The Hunted in a much better light, awarding the film a score of 100%. He said that casting Lambert as an unexpected hero was "refreshing", and praised the dynamic between Takeda and Kinjo. Shirey selected the battle in the bullet train as the most outstanding scene of the film. Filmsondisc.com gave the film a B+ rating, saying that plot holes can be ignored because of "consistent characters" and "concentrated and polished" production. The reviewer found Lambert "well-suited to his role", and deemed Lone "better than usual". Brian McKay for eFilmCritic.com gave the film 4 stars out of 5, calling the film "pretty entertaining" and praising the sword fights, but concluding that the film focuses too much on Lambert's character instead of Harada's, the latter sentiment echoed by The Austin Chronicle.

== Soundtrack ==
The Hunted: Original Motion Picture Soundtrack

Soundtrack album by Kodō
- Released: May 9, 1995
- Length: 44:22
- Labels: TriStar Music; 67202
- Producer: Keiichi Nakamura

Professional ratings
Review scores
Source	Rating
Allmusic	4.5/5 stars

The Hunted features music by the Japanese taiko drum troupe Kodō. The soundtrack was recorded from July to November 1994, and a CD was released on May 9, 1995, by TriStar Music, consisting of songs composed by Motofumi Yamaguchi and Leonard Eto. The song "Matsuri (Irodori)" was recorded on the set in Kodō Village on Sado Island. The recording portrayed a performance attended by the characters Racine and Kirina. Adam Greenberg, writing for Allmusic, gave the soundtrack 4.5 stars out of 5, extolling Lawton's decision to have Kodō handle the entire soundtrack. He was most impressed by "Kirina's Theme" and recommended the soundtrack to fans of Japanese music. Jack Donen of Djembe Magazine deemed the soundtrack "tailored to Western ears", owing to a greater use of syncopation and several synthesizer sequences.

No.	Title	Writer(s)	Length
1.	"The Hunted Main Theme"	Motofumi Yamaguchi	5:03
2.	"Kirina's Theme"	Motofumi Yamaguchi	1:02
3.	"Intruder"	Motofumi Yamaguchi	1:21
4.	"Love Affair (Papa's Palm Wine)"	Leonard Eto	2:13
5.	"Punishment of Betrayal"	Motofumi Yamaguchi	0:59
6.	"Matsuri (Irodori)"	Leonard Eto	9:59
7.	"Darkness"	Motofumi Yamaguchi	1:39
8.	"Kirina's Theme"	Motofumi Yamaguchi	1:25
9.	"Irritation"	Motofumi Yamaguchi	1:39
10.	"Oshima's Theme (Tsuki-No-Sei)"	Leonard Eto	2:44
11.	"Run"	Motofumi Yamaguchi	1:55
12.	"Remembering Kirina 1"	Motofumi Yamaguchi	1:24
13.	"The Battle"	Motofumi Yamaguchi	4:23
14.	"Remembering Kirina 2"	Motofumi Yamaguchi	1:04
15.	"The Hunted Ending Theme"	Motofumi Yamaguchi	7:32
Total length:			44:22
