= Bryan Clark (actor) =

American actor (1929–2022)

- Born: April 5, 1929; Louisville, Kentucky, U.S.
- Died: September 9, 2022 (aged 93); Hollywood, Los Angeles, California, U.S.
- Other name: Bryan E. Clark
- Education: Fordham University
- Occupation: Actor
- Spouse: Jo Deodato Clark
- Children: 5

Bryan Clark (April 5, 1929 – September 9, 2022), sometimes credited as Bryan E. Clark, was an American film, television, and stage actor.

== Early life and education ==
Clark was born in Louisville, Kentucky, the only child of pharmacist Bryan Clark and Maybelle Chester Clark. He spent many summers at Eugene O'Neil Playwright's Conference and studied singing, acting, and dancing. Clark performed with the Rockettes at Radio City Music Hall at the age of 15 and also played the clarinet in a big band while attending Fordham University.

== Career ==
Over a career spanning several decades, his film roles included All the President's Men (1976), Trading Places (1983), Don't Tell Mom the Babysitter's Dead (1991), Without Warning: The James Brady Story (1991).

On TV, his guest and recurring appearances in many television shows include Cheers, where he played the bartender Earl in Season 9, Wings, Becker, Suddenly Susan, St. Elsewhere, Who's the Boss?, The Nanny, Murphy Brown (playing Corky's dad), and Chicago Hope.

Known for his "striking" resemblance to Ronald Reagan, he was often cast as him in various productions, including Guts and Glory: The Rise and Fall of Oliver North (1989), Without Warning: The James Brady Story (1991), Pizza Man (1991), and an episode of Dark Skies ("Bloodlines").

Clark was also known for being a spokesman for Folgers coffee in the 1980s and other friendly personalities in various commercials, including one for Tavern on the Green, and various stage roles. The New York Times complimented his performance in the 1978 Off-Broadway play Winning.

== Personal life ==
Clark was married to actress Jo Deodato Clark for 65 years and they had five children.

== Filmography ==
=== Film ===
Year	Title	Role	Notes
1976	All the President's Men	Arguing Attorney	
1976	Brotherhood of Death	Sheriff	
1983	Trading Places	Official #2	
1986	Sweet Liberty	Governor Swayze	
1987	Mankillers	Williams	
1990	Megaville	President Hughes	
1991	Don't Tell Mom the Babysitter's Dead	Dr. Permutter	
1991	Pizza Man	Ronald Reagan	
1992	The Unnamable II: The Statement of Randolph Carter	Prof. Thurber	
1992	Body of Evidence	Clerk	
1992	Unbecoming Age	Sam	
1993	Sugar Hill	Dean	
1997	Bombshell	Male News Anchor	
2004	The Remembering Movies	Grandpa Lou	
2005	The Civilization of Maxwell Bright	Justice of the Peace	
2014	Rickover: The Birth of Nuclear Power	Reagan	

=== Television ===
Year	Title	Role	Notes
1974	Lincoln: Trial by Fire	Stephen W. Kearny	Television film
1978	The Critical List	CIA Assassin	Television film
1981	Ryan's Hope	Dr. Jerry Markus	Episode #1.1658
1986	Magnum, P.I.	Richard Lindley	Episode: "A.A.P.I."
1987	St. Elsewhere	Dr. Watson	3 episodes
1988, 1989	Days of Our Lives	Walter Morgan / Editor	2 episodes
1989	Guts and Glory: The Rise and Fall of Oliver North	Ronald Reagan	Television film
1989	Free Spirit	Judge Douglas Crater	Episode: "Not with My Sister You Don't"
1990	Alien Nation	The Senator	Episode: "Spirit of '95"
1990	Wings	Security Guard	Episode: "Return to Nantucket: Part 1"
1990	Shattered Dreams	Martin Harris	Television film
1990	Cheers	Earl	Episode: "Rebecca Redux"
1990	Extreme Close-Up	Relative	Television film
1990	Charles in Charge	Professor Haskins	Episode: "Charles Be DeMille"
1990	Who's the Boss?	Chief Baxter	Episode: "Four Alarm Tony"
1990–1996	Murphy Brown	Edward Sherwood	3 episodes
1991	Without Warning: The James Brady Story	Ronald Reagan	Television film
1991	Knots Landing	Don Bailey	Episode: "Holiday on Ice"
1992	Harry and the Hendersons	Gipper	Episode: "The Blue Parrot"
1992	Jake and the Fatman	Judge #2	Episode: "Stormy Weather: Part 2"
1992	Woman with a Past	Boss	Television film
1992	Quicksand: No Escape	Commissioner Freeman	Television film
1992	Eerie, Indiana	IRS Man	Episode: "Zombies in P.J.s"
1993	Bob	Father	2 episodes
1993, 1995	Grace Under Fire	Emmet Kelley / Charlie	2 episodes
1994	Another Midnight Run	Doctor	Television film
1994	The Nanny	Auditioner #1	Episode: "The Gym Teacher"
1994	A Time to Heal	Mr. Barton	Television film
1995	Thunder Alley	Wrong Way Burdett	Episode: "Are We There Yet?"
1995	Hope & Gloria	Pastor Earl	Episode: "I Never Sang for Our Father"
1995	Lois & Clark: The New Adventures of Superman	Older Man	Episode: "Individual Responsibility"
1995	Saved by the Bell: The New Class	Captain	Episode: "Green Card"
1996–1998	Suddenly Susan	Mr. Richmond	3 episodes
1995	Picket Fences	Bishop of Rome	Episode: "Witness for the Prosecution"
1997	Coach	Mr. Waterman	Episode: "The Body Gardener"
1997	Dark Skies	Ronald Reagan	Episode: "Blood Lines"
1997, 1998	The Practice	Attorney / Stanley Ryerson	2 episodes
1999	Chicago Hope	Dr. Alonzo DeGriff	Episode: "Oh What a Piece of Work Is Man"
2000	Becker	Guard	Episode: "Panic on the 86th"
2000	Normal, Ohio	Morris	Episode: "Just Another Normal Christmas"
