= Blankman =

1994 film by Mike Binder

- Theatrical release poster
- Directed by: Mike Binder
- Written by: Damon Wayans; J. F. Lawton
- Produced by: C. O. Erickson; Eric L. Gold
- Starring: Damon Wayans; David Alan Grier; Robin Givens; Jon Polito; Jason Alexander
- Cinematography: Newton Thomas Sigel
- Edited by: Adam Weiss
- Music by: Miles Goodman; Michael Jay
- Production company: Wife N' Kids
- Distributed by: Columbia Pictures (through Sony Pictures Releasing)
- Release date: August 19, 1994
- Running time: 96 minutes
- Country: United States
- Language: English
- Budget: $24-30 million
- Box office: $7.9 million

Blankman is a 1994 American superhero comedy parody film directed by Mike Binder and written by Damon Wayans and J. F. Lawton. The film stars Wayans, David Alan Grier, Robin Givens, Jon Polito, and Jason Alexander. Its plot follows a repairman who is inspired to become a superhero after his grandmother is murdered in a mob hit. Blankman was released in the United States by Sony Pictures Releasing on August 19, 1994. The film received negative reviews from critics.

== Plot ==
As kids, Darryl and Kevin Walker grew up as fans of the television series Batman. Now grown, Darryl is a clumsy, nerdy repairman, while his brother Kevin is a tabloid news cameraman. They both live with their grandmother, who is an avid supporter of Alderman Marvin Harris, a politician from their neighborhood running for mayor on an anti-corruption platform. Kevin is interested in getting out of making tabloids and doing a serious story about mobster Michael "The Suit" Minelli, but his attempts to do so are shot down by his boss, Larry Stone, a perverted tabloid news junkie. Darryl is overly optimistic and almost childishly naive to the harsh realities of living in the inner city (such as the crackhouse next door), but is a brilliant inventor, having constructed a mobile robot assistant named J-5, among other creations.

One night, after Harris wins acclaim by publicly refusing a bribe from Minelli, Grandma Walker is murdered by Sammy the Blade at Harris's campaign headquarters. The murder opens Darryl's eyes to the urban decay around him and he begins to fight crime by boldly saving an elderly transit passenger from being mugged, but overreaches by storming the crackhouse next door to rebuke the gang members. He then decides to become a vigilante superhero, using his technical expertise to create weapons and gadgets – in particular, a substance which renders ordinary clothing bulletproof – for his crime-fighting crusade, all to the annoyance of Kevin.

After Darryl is nearly killed trying to protect a citizen on the street and is arrested by the cops who ridiculed him after he demanded to see the police commissioner, Kevin takes Darryl to see a psychiatrist. It doesn't work in Kevin's favor, as Darryl denies being a superhero and puts the blame on Kevin, whom the psychiatrist then attempts to psychoanalyze. Kevin changes his mind and goes along with the fantasy, believing that it's Darryl's way to cope with the murder of their grandmother, but under the guidance of starting a neighborhood watch instead. When a girl tells them of a pregnant woman trapped in an elevator, Darryl arrives as his superhero alter-ego. Upon delivering the baby, he is surrounded by many, including reporters. Asked for his name, Darryl just stares; Kevin says he's gone blank, which everyone interprets as his name: Blankman.

Over time, Darryl uses his Blankman identity to protect various community members, build up a reputation, and inspire not only the town's citizens but other real-life superheroes. One person interested in him is Kimberly Jonz, a fellow reporter whom Kevin hopes to win the affection of. When Kimberly wants to know if it's possible to get an interview with Blankman, Kevin begs Darryl to allow her to interview him. He relents, on the condition that she wear a carnation. Taking her on his Blank-Cycle at the train tracks, he brings her to his secret hideout: the "Blank Station", an abandoned subway station filled with all of his inventions, or, in his words, "junk". Kimberly interviews him about how and why he took up crime fighting, revealing it was because of the death of his grandmother. Impressed by his heroics and modesty, Kimberly immediately falls in love with him. She kisses him, only for him to panic when he gets an erection.

Mayor Harris attempts to bring in outside money to pay the IOUs the city has been giving its workers and requests that Blankman be there to protect the people and receive a special award. As the money is released, Minelli's henchmen storm the bank and take the mayor hostage, threatening to detonate explosives. At the police chief's request and the crowd's chants, Blankman attempts to save the mayor, but even with Kevin's help, he is unable to stop the crooks, nor defuse the bombs. Before the bombs go off, Darryl reveals his identity and his grandmother's support for the mayor. Harris wishes him well, warning him to run, and says he will tell Darryl's grandmother about him. Blankman runs out screaming as the bank explodes, killing Harris. The crowd, seeing his failure, turn on him and chase him down the street. Now a pariah, Darryl gives up on crime fighting and even a possible relationship with Kimberly. Trying for a normal life, he gets a job at a McDonald's.

Wanting a great story, Larry Stone manages to contact Minelli and trades knowledge of Blankman's love for Kimberly in exchange for an exclusive interview. While researching Minelli and Grandma Walker's murder, Kimberly realizes his true identity and calls Kevin with the news, only for Minelli to take Kimberly hostage. Thinking he is talking to Blankman, Minelli threatens to kill Kimberly if Blankman doesn't show up. Kevin rushes to Darryl's workplace with the news, but Darryl refuses to help until Kevin reveals Minelli killed their grandmother. They leave and change to their superhero identities, with Kevin agreeing to wear a costume himself as "Other Guy". The two heroes rush to the TV station, where Minelli has murdered a reporter and is threatening others, including Stone. The two engage in a fight with Minelli's goons, but they lose. They are placed in a water tank and left to drown, with Stone and Kimberly chained up and left to die, and Minelli has hidden bombs to destroy the building. Blankman calls J-5 to save them and succeeds. The duo then finds the bombs in the women's bathroom, and stuffs the explosives inside J-5, while he frees Kimberly (Stone is left behind, as a joke by Other Guy). Once outside, the explosives detonate, destroying J-5. Distraught, Blankman swears revenge.

Tracking Minelli to his factory hideout, Blankman and Other Guy prepare for the final battle. Other Guy is overconfident and gets wounded because his costume is not bulletproof. Blankman then defeats Minelli's goons with his electric "newchucks" and activates his jet-powered roller blades to capture Minelli, delivering him to the police and finally avenging their grandmother's death. Blankman, this time with Other Guy, is once again acknowledged as a hero by the people and receives the Mayor Harris Award for outstanding community service at a ceremony in their honor, while Other Guy receives a Blankman T-shirt, much to his disgust. After the ceremony, Kevin introduces Kimberly to Darryl. The two make light conversation until Kimberly pretends to see a purse snatcher, which puts Darryl on high alert. It was a trick, as Kimberly reveals she already knows that Darryl is Blankman to prove it, she kisses Darryl, causing him to fall to the ground embarrassingly like before. The film ends with a shot of a banner that reads "We Love You Blankman and Other Guy."

== Cast ==
- Damon Wayans as Darryl Walker/Blankman, a nerdy, gullible man child. He decides to become a superhero to turn his neighborhood around following the death of his grandmother. His best friend is his homemade robot, "J-5".
  - Michael Wayans as young Darryl Walker
- David Alan Grier as Kevin Walker/Other Guy, Darryl's cynical older brother who works as a cameraman for the local news. He initially has no interest in being a superhero, but later has a change of heart and joins Darryl as his sidekick, Other Guy. He shows himself to be a natural martial artist after helping defend Darryl in his first outing as Blankman.
  - Damon Wayans Jr. as young Kevin Walker
- Jon Polito as Michael "The Suit" Minelli, a suave, malicious, and mean-spirited mobster who constantly harasses Mayor Harris. He is also responsible for the murder of Darryl and Kevin's grandmother.
- Robin Givens as Kimberly Jonz, a TV news anchor and the love interest of both Darryl and Kevin. While she has no interest in Kevin, she falls in love with Blankman/Darryl almost instantly.
- Jason Alexander as Larry Stone, Kimberly and Kevin's selfish, perverted, and hotheaded boss. He uses a wheelchair.
- Lynne Thigpen as Eleanor Walker, Darryl and Kevin's late grandmother. Despite being a loving grandmother, she has a smart mouth, which ultimately leads to her death.
- Christopher Lawford as Mayor Marvin Harris
- Tony Cox as Midget Man
- Kevin West as Gay Man
- Yvette Wilson as Fat Girl
- Harris Peet as Gains
- Arsenio Hall as himself
- Nickie Corello as Sammy The Blade
- Joseph Vassallo as Tony The Match

== Production ==
Damon Wayans said the inspiration for Blankman came about from his memories of watching the 60s Batman show growing up. Upon seeing the 1989 Batman, Wayans said he was disappointed with the film's self serious tone and lack of jokes and humor in comparison to the original but did enjoy the film's depiction of the gadgets and Batmobile. This in turn led to Wayans imagining a scenario wherein Batman instead of being Bruce Wayne the billionaire would instead be a welfare recipient and served as the initial inspiration for Blankman. Wayans said that for the movie it was essential his take on Robin getting his time to shine as he was always portrayed as the one with all the passion on the TV series.

In January 1993, it was reported that Columbia Pictures was in negotiations with the Hudlin Brothers to direct the Damon Wayans vehicle Blankman, which Wayans also wrote, with the intention of rushing production for release sometime around the holiday season of that year. The Hudlins ultimately passed on directing the film due to issues related to creative control.

Production began in September 1993 with Mike Binder directing. Binder himself was a massive comic book fan and when Wayans told him of the underlying concept of Blankman he loved it and described it as an opportunity to do "Batman without the money" and a more comedic tone.

== Reception ==
Blankman was panned by critics and was a box office disappointment. On the review aggregator website Rotten Tomatoes, 12% of 17 critics' reviews are positive, with an average rating of 3.8/10. The film went on to become a cult hit through home video.

One critic who gave it a mildly positive review was Stephen Holden of The New York Times, who said that it "gets most of its comic mileage from its wonderful gadgets and from Mr. Wayans's sweetly myopic performance" and that the film "plays it light and silly but not so broadly that the movie collapses into chaos."

== Year-end lists ==
- Top 10 worst (not ranked) – Betsy Pickle, Knoxville News-Sentinel
- Top 18 worst (alphabetically listed, not ranked) – Michael Mills, The Palm Beach Post
- Worst films (not ranked) – Jeff Simon, The Buffalo News

== In popular culture ==
The film is featured in an episode of the television adaptation Twisted Metal, based on the video game series of the same name. In it, the main characters reenact the "Blank Wheel" scene due to cut audio.
