= Charlie Robinson (actor) =

American actor (1945–2021)

- Robinson in 2009
- Born: Charles P. Robinson; November 9, 1945; Houston, Texas, U.S.
- Died: July 11, 2021 (aged 75); Los Angeles, California, U.S.
- Occupations: Actor, director
- Years active: 1971–2021
- Spouse(s): Arvis Robinson (m. 1968; div. 1978); Venus Duran (m. 19??; div. 19??) Dolorita Noonan-Robinson (m. 1996)
- Children: 4

Charlie Robinson (November 9, 1945 – July 11, 2021) was an American stage, film and television actor. He is best known for his role on the NBC sitcom Night Court as Macintosh "Mac" Robinson (Seasons 2–9), the clerk of the court and a Vietnam War veteran.

Although his most frequent on-screen billing was Charlie Robinson, Night Court had credited him as Charles Robinson throughout his 1984–1992 stint as Mac. In two of his earliest film appearances, 1974's Sugar Hill and 1975's The Black Gestapo, he was credited as Charles P. Robinson. Some of his credits have been occasionally commingled with those of older actor Charles Knox Robinson who, between 1958 and 1971, was featured in numerous films and television episodes under the stage name Charles Robinson.

== Early life ==
Robinson was born in Houston, to Planey and Ora (Barnes) Robinson. He served in the Army and briefly attended the University of Houston before his departure to pursue an acting career.

== Early career ==
In Robinson's early career, he was a singer: as a teenager with the group Archie Bell and the Drells and later with a group called Southern Clouds of Joy.

== Later career ==
Robinson's early acting credits include appearances in the films Sugar Hill (1974), Black Gestapo (1975), and the television series The White Shadow, Lou Grant, Flamingo Road, Hill Street Blues, and St. Elsewhere. Robinson was cast in the role of Newdell in the NBC comedy Buffalo Bill. Not the success it was expected to be, Buffalo Bill was canceled after two seasons and replaced by Night Court. Robinson was cast as court clerk Mac Robinson, after the first season in 1984, when Karen Austin, who played the original court clerk, left the cast. Robinson played the role on Night Court from 1984 until the show ended in 1992. He also directed three episodes of the series.

From 1992 to 1995, Robinson co-starred on the sitcom Love & War, replacing John Hancock who died a few episodes into the series run. Robinson played character Bud Harper in Home Improvement, and appeared in many other television shows including The Fresh Prince of Bel Air, Touched by an Angel, Soul Food, Antwone Fisher, My Wife and Kids, The Bernie Mac Show, Charmed, House, Cold Case, How I Met Your Mother, My Name Is Earl, The Game, and Hart of Dixie.

He did commercial work for NEXTEL in which he asks a worker if he's "agitating my dots" after he walks in on two other dispatchers staring at the dots, which represented delivery workers, on a computer screen. He also did commercials for Old Spice, where he played the head coach of the NFL's Denver Broncos, appearing with perennial All-Pro Bronco linebacker Von Miller.

In 2010, Robinson worked at the Oregon Shakespeare Festival and co-starred in the film Jackson which was directed by J. F. Lawton. Robinson appeared as "Troy" in August Wilson's Fences at Southern California's South Coast Repertory in Costa Mesa from January 22, 2010 until February 21, 2010. In September 2013, he returned to the theater to portray Willy Loman in Death of a Salesman. In 2015, he played Mr. Munson, the blind tenant on Mom whom Bonnie avoids helping with apartment issues.

== Illness and death ==
Robinson died on July 11, 2021, at Ronald Reagan UCLA Medical Center, from cardiac arrest with multisystem organ failure due to septic shock and metastatic adenocarcinoma. He was 75.

== Filmography ==
=== Film ===
| Year | Film | Role | Notes |
|---|---|---|---|
| 1971 | Drive, He Said | Jollop | |
| 1973 | Set This Town on Fire | Brad Wells | TV film |
| 1974 | Sugar Hill | Fabulous | |
| 1975 | The Black Gestapo | Colonel Kojah | |
| 1977 | Nowhere to Hide | Deputy Ted Willoughby | TV film |
| 1977 | A Killing Affair | Buck Fryman | TV film |
| 1977 | The Trial of Lee Harvey Oswald | Melvin Johnson | TV film |
| 1978 | Gray Lady Down | McAllister | |
| 1979 | Apocalypse Now | Soldier | Uncredited |
| 1979 | Buffalo Soldiers | Private Wright | TV film |
| 1980 | Haywire | Male Nurse | TV film |
| 1982 | Rehearsal for Murder | The Second Officer | TV film |
| 1984 | The River | Truck | |
| 1988 | Crash Course | Larry Pearle | TV film |
| 1990 | Murder C.O.D. | Lieutenant Silk | TV film |
| 1996 | Project: ALF | Dr. Stanley | TV film |
| 1996 | Set It Off | Nate | |
| 1998 | Land of the Free | Matt McCaster | |
| 1999 | Malevolence | Henry Wilson | |
| 1999 | Beowulf | Weaponsmaster | |
| 2000 | The Last Dance | Ned | TV film |
| 2000 | The Playaz Court | Ike | |
| 2001 | Scam | Larry the Lawyer | Short film |
| 2002 | Antwone Fisher | Howard | |
| 2002 | Santa Jr. | Judge Wheeler | TV film |
| 2002 | Miss Lettie and Me | Isaiah Griffin | TV film |
| 2003 | Secret Santa | Russell | TV film |
| 2004 | Barbershop Blues | TC | Direct-to-video |
| 2004 | The Passage of Mrs. Calabash | The Professor | Short film |
| 2005 | Break a Leg | Captain Stevens | |
| 2005 | Taco! | Detective Furlong | Short film |
| 2005 | Triple Cross | Alex | Direct-to-video |
| 2005 | River's End | Deputy 'Fetch' Brown | |
| 2006 | Even Money | Coach Washington | |
| 2006 | McBride: Requiem | Judge Jeffries | TV film |
| 2006 | Mercy Street | Mr. King | |
| 2007 | McBride: Dogged | Judge Jeffries | TV film |
| 2007 | King Baby | Chuck | Short film |
| 2007 | Steam | Reverend Patterson | |
| 2008 | The House Bunny | Francis | |
| 2008 | Jackson | Sam | |
| 2008 | Natural Disasters | Charlie | |
| 2009 | Ronna and Beverly | Leron | TV film |
| 2009 | Alligator Point | | TV film |
| 2010 | Krews | Mr. Davis | |
| 2011 | Light | Store Clerk | |
| 2012 | Falling Away | Mr. King | |
| 2012 | Swerve | Charlie | Direct-to-video |
| 2012 | Rosita Lopez for President | Thomas Hamilton | Short film |
| 2015 | Hoovey | Coach Wilson | |
| 2015 | Russell Madness | Mike | |
| 2015 | Sweet Kandy | Eddie Morehouse | |
| 2015 | Come Away with Me | Michael Blake | Short film |
| 2015 | How Sarah Got Her Wings | Max | |
| 2016 | Pee-wee's Big Holiday | Police Captain | |
| 2017 | Maybe Someday | Edgar | |
| 2020 | Blindfire | Albert Hughes | |
| 2021 | Senior Entourage | Charlie | |
| 2021 | Sleepwalker | Charlie | Short film |

=== Television ===
| Year | Series | Role | Notes |
|---|---|---|---|
| 1971 | Owen Marshall, Counselor at Law | Cal Morgan | Episode: "The Forest and the Trees" |
| 1974 | Firehouse | | Episode: "Burst of Flame" |
| 1975 | Caribe | Kishara | Episode: "The Assassin" |
| 1975 | Cannon | Hank Colcutt | Episode: "To Still the Voice" |
| 1978 | King | Detective Ed Redditt | Miniseries, 3 episodes |
| 1978 | The White Shadow | Jackie Solomon | Episode: "Bonus Baby" |
| 1979 | Lou Grant | Don | Episode: "Vet" |
| 1979 | Roots: The Next Generations | Luke Bettiger | Episode: "Part IV" |
| 1981 | Flamingo Road | Phil | Recurring role, 7 episodes |
| 1982 | Hill Street Blues | Roy | Episode: "Pestolozzi's Revenge" |
| 1982 | St. Elsewhere | Bill Austin | Episode: "Tweety and Ralph" |
| 1983-1984 | Buffalo Bill | Newdell | Series regular, 18 episodes |
| 1984-1992 | Night Court | Mac Robinson | Series regular, 180 episodes |
| 1986 | Hotel | Curtis Powell | Episode: "Hidden Talents" |
| 1992-1995 | Love & War | Abe Johnson | Series regular, 57 episodes |
| 1993 | CBS Schoolbreak Special | Sam Raynor | Episode: "Other Mothers" |
| 1995 | The Fresh Prince of Bel-Air | Ernest | Episode: "To Thine Own Self Be Blue... and Gold" |
| 1995-1999 | Home Improvement | Bud Harper | Recurring role, 9 episodes |
| 1996 | The John Larroquette Show | Norm Jones | Episode: "John's Lucky Day" |
| 1996 | In the House | Major | Episode: "A Major Problem" |
| 1996 | The Crew | Reverend William Edwards | Episode: "The Man We Love" |
| 1996-1997 | Ink | Ernie Trainor | Series regular, 22 episodes |
| 1997 | Malcolm & Eddie | Marcus McGee | Episodes: "The Courtship of Eddie's Mother" & "Mixed Nuts" |
| 1998-2000 | Buddy Faro | El Jefe | Series regular, 13 episodes |
| 1999 | Touched by an Angel | Cyrus | Episode: "Black Like Monica" |
| 2001 | Soul Food | Reverend Pryor | Episode: "Take Me to the Water" |
| 2001 | First Years | Judge | Episode: "The First Thing You Do..." |
| 2001 | Two Guys, a Girl and a Pizza Place | Officer Harris | Episode: "Should I Stay or Should I Go?" |
| 2001 | DAG | Russell Daggett | Episode: "Mr. Daggett Goes to Washington" |
| 2001 | The Trouble with Normal | Mr. Lindquist | Episode: "Help Yourself" |
| 2002 | My Wife and Kids | Joe Kyle | Episode: "Failure to Communicate" |
| 2003 | Yes, Dear | Goodwill Guy | Episode: "Space Jam" |
| 2003 | Abby | Hank Newton | Episode: "The Mama and the Papa" |
| 2003 | Andy Richter Controls the Universe | Warden | Episode: "Charity Begins in Cellblock D" |
| 2003 | Carnivàle | Walter | Episode: "Tipton" |
| 2004 | The Bernie Mac Show | Earl Davis | Episode: "Hair Jordan" |
| 2005 | Committed | Marvin | Episode: "The Mother Episode" |
| 2005 | Charmed | Mike | Episode: "Show Ghouls" |
| 2005 | House M.D. | Robert | Episode: "Humpty Dumpty" |
| 2005 | Cold Case | Anton | Episode: "Committed" |
| 2006 | Still Standing | Scully | Episode: "Still Deceitful" |
| 2006 | How I Met Your Mother | Bank President | Episode: "Aldrin Justice" |
| 2007 | The Riches | Dr. Dibadeaux | Episode: "The Big Floss" |
| 2007 | My Name Is Earl | Doctor | Episode: "Two Balls, Two Strikes" |
| 2007-2014 | The Game | Thomas Pitts | Recurring role, 4 episodes |
| 2008 | 30 Rock | Charles Robinson | Episode: "The One with the Cast of 'Night Court'" |
| 2009 | Big Love | Baptist | Episode: "Come, Ye Saints" |
| 2009 | Hank | Reuben | Episode: "Relax, Don't Do It" |
| 2010 | The Secret Life of the American Teenager | | Episode: "Ben There, Done That" |
| 2010 | $h*! My Dad Says | Mr. Campbell | Episode: "You Can't Handle the Truce" |
| 2011 | Harry's Law | Judge Marvin Baum | Episode: "Bangers in the House" |
| 2012 | The Soul Man | Ike | Episode: "Lost in the Move" |
| 2012-2015 | Hart of Dixie | Sergeant Jeffries | Series regular, 16 episodes |
| 2013 | Key & Peele | Pawn Shop Owner | Episode: "Season 3, Episode 12" |
| 2015 | Reed Between the Lines | Monroe Reed | Episodes: "You Have to Let Go" & "I'm Not Superman" |
| 2015 | K.C. Undercover | Pops | Episode: "Off the Grid" |
| 2015 | Key & Peele | Dying Father | Episode: "The End" |
| 2015-2019 | Mom | Mr. Munson | Recurring role, 7 episodes |
| 2016 | Grey's Anatomy | Leo Polson | Episode: "You're Gonna Need Someone on Your Side" |
| 2017 | K.C. Undercover | Othello King | Episode: "Out of the Water and Into the Fire" |
| 2017 | Disjointed | Scooter Boots | Episode: "Donna Weed" |
| 2017-2018 | The Guest Book | Wilfred | Series regular, 11 episodes |
| 2018 | This Is Us | Don Robinson | Episodes: "Katie Girls" &"Toby" |
| 2018 | NCIS | Ray Jennings | Episode: "Fragments" |
| 2019 | Better Things | Sylvester | Episode: "Holding" |
| 2020 | Raven's Home | Mr. Arthur | Episodes: "Close Shave" & "On Edge" |
| 2020 | Russell Maniac | Mike | Episode: "Ferraro Family Business" |
| 2020 | Love in the Time of Corona | Charles | Miniseries, 4 episodes |
