= Been Down So Long It Looks Like Up to Me (film) =

1971 American drama film

- Theatrical release poster
- Directed by: Jeffrey Young
- Screenplay by: Robert Schlitt
- Based on: Been Down So Long It Looks Like Up to Me by Richard Fariña
- Produced by: Robert M. Rosenthal
- Starring: Barry Primus; Susan Tyrrell; Bruce Davison; Zack Norman
- Cinematography: Urs Furrer
- Edited by: Nicholas Meyers; Bruce Witkin
- Music by: Garry Sherman
- Production company: Paramount Pictures
- Distributed by: Paramount Pictures
- Release date: September 15, 1971
- Running time: 90 minutes
- Country: United States
- Language: English

Been Down So Long It Looks Like Up to Me is a 1971 American drama film directed by Jeffrey Young and written by Robert Schlitt and adapted from the Richard Fariña novel of the same name. The film stars Barry Primus, Susan Tyrrell, Bruce Davison and Zack Norman. The film was released on September 15, 1971, by Paramount Pictures.

== Plot ==
Free-thinking student tries to put up with life at a strait-laced college in 1958.

== Cast ==
- Barry Primus as Gnossos "Paps" Pappadapoulis
- Linda De Coff as Kristin
- David Downing as Heff
- Susan Tyrrell as Jack
- James Noble as Father Putti
- Philip Shafer as "Flip"
- Zack Norman as "Mojo"
- Bruce Davison as Fitzgore
- Raúl Juliá as Juan Carlos Rosenbloom
- Cynthia Harris as Beth

== See also ==
- List of American films of 1971
