= Pizza Man (1991 film) =

- VHS cover art
- Directed by: J.F. Lawton
- Written by: J.F. Lawton
- Produced by: Gary W. Goldstein
- Starring: Bill Maher; Annabelle Gurwitch
- Cinematography: Fred Samia
- Release date: December 6, 1991
- Running time: 87 minutes
- Country: United States
- Language: English

Pizza Man is a 1991 comedy film starring Bill Maher and Annabelle Gurwitch; written and directed by J.F. Lawton, who was credited as J.D. Athens.

== Plot ==
Elmo Bunn is an L.A. pizza delivery man with a reputation for never having delivered a cold pizza or being stiffed on a bill. When a call comes into his shop for an extra-large with sausage and anchovies to go to a dangerous part of East Hollywood, Elmo knows he's in for trouble.

== Credited cast ==
- Bill Maher as Elmo Bunn
- Annabelle Gurwitch as The Dame
- David McKnight as Vance
- Bob Delegall as Mayor Bradley
- Bryan Clark as Ronald Reagan
- Arlene Banas as Marilyn Quayle
- Ron Darian as Michael Dukakis
- Jeff Hawk as Dan Quayle
- Jim Jackman as Mike Milken
- Clyde Kusatsu as Former Prime Minister Nakasone
- Francine Lee as Anan
- John Moody as Bob Woodward
- Sam Pancake as The Kid
- Simon Richards as Donald Trump
- Andy Romano as The Hood
- Cathy Shambley as Geraldine Ferraro

== Critical reception ==
The Los Angeles Times wrote in a review of the film, "Lawton has a real winner in Maher, a hairy-chested macho guy with a great sense of humor, and with also the femme fatale of his plot, Annabelle Gurwitch, who has no trouble being glamorous and funny at the same time."
