= Barry Primus =

American film director and actor (born 1938)

- Born: February 16, 1938 (age 88); New York City, New York, U.S.
- Education: Bennington College
- Occupations: Actor; director; writer
- Years active: 1963–present
- Spouse: Julie Arenal

Barry Primus (born February 16, 1938) is an American television and film actor, director, and writer.

== Career ==
While Primus is primarily an actor, he has also worked as a writer and director in films in which he has acted. For the first decade of his career, he was employed as a stage actor. He gained some experience on TV in shows like The Defenders, East Side/West Side and The Virginian.

He then made his initial film appearance in the Manhattan-filmed The Brotherhood (1968). His other films include Been Down So Long It Looks Like Up to Me (1971), Boxcar Bertha (1972), Autopsy (1975), Heartland (1979), The Rose (1979), Night Games (1980), Absence of Malice (1981), and Guilty by Suspicion (1991). He had a recurring role on the TV series Cagney and Lacey (1982 — 1988) as Christine Cagney (Sharon Gless)'s boyfriend, Sergeant Dory McKenna, whose drug problem compromises his performance as a fellow police officer.

After working as second unit director on Mark Rydell's The Rose (1979), Primus increased his behind-the-camera activities; in 1992, he directed his first theatrical feature, the "inside" Hollywood comedy/drama Mistress.

A member of the Actors Studio, Primus has taught acting and directing classes at the American Film Institute, Lee Strasberg Theatre and Film Institute, the UCLA campus, and at The Maine Media Workshops in Maine. He has taught acting at Loyola Marymount University and at Columbia University.

Primus's recent film work includes Jackson, a film directed by J.F. Lawton. He had cameos in Righteous Kill with Al Pacino and Robert De Niro, American Hustle, Grudge Match, and The Irishman.

== Personal life ==
Primus has been married to choreographer Julie Arenal for over 50 years.

== Filmography ==
=== Film ===
- 1968 The Brotherhood as Vido
- 1970 Puzzle of a Downfall Child as Aaron Reinhardt
- 1971 Von Richthofen and Brown as Hermann Goering
- 1971 Been Down So Long It Looks Like Up to Me as Gnossos 'Paps' Pappadopoulis
- 1972 Boxcar Bertha as Rake Brown
- 1974 The Gravy Train as Tony
- 1975 Autopsy as Father Paul Lenox
- 1977 New York, New York as Paul Wilson
- 1978 Avalanche as Mark Elliott
- 1979 Heartland as Jack
- 1979 The Rose as Dennis
- 1980 Night Games as Jason St. John
- 1981 Absence of Malice as Waddell
- 1983 Over Here, Mr. President as Mike Yaeger
- 1984 The River as Roy
- 1986 Down and Out in Beverly Hills as Lou Waltzberg
- 1986 Jake Speed as Lawrence
- 1986 SpaceCamp as Brennan
- 1987 Talking Walls as Professor Hirsch
- 1987 The Stranger as Sergeant Drake
- 1988 Big Business as Michael
- 1989 Cannibal Women in the Avocado Jungle of Death as Ford Maddox
- 1990 Denial as Jay
- 1990 Torn Apart as Arie Arnon
- 1990 Final Stage as Detective #1
- 1991 Guilty by Suspicion as Bert Alan
- 1992 Night and the City as Tommy Tessler
- 1992 Mistress (writer, director, producer)
- 1996 Flipping as Joey, Leo's Crew
- 2001 15 Minutes as Cab Driver
- 2001 Life as a House as Tom
- 2003 Frankie and Johnny Are Married as Himself
- 2004 Cross Bronx as Mary Green
- 2004 When Will I Be Loved as Victor Barrie
- 2005 Break a Leg as Ira Goldstein
- 2006 Mustang Sally as Dr. Koshansky
- 2008 Jackson as Donald
- 2008 Righteous Kill as Dr. Prosky
- 2012 The Legend as Arnold
- 2013 Memoirs (Short) as Ray Harris
- 2013 American Hustle as Tellegio's Consigliere
- 2013 Grudge Match as Joey, The Bartender
- 2013 Redemption as Scott McCabe
- 2013 The Next Cassavetes as Fire Marshal
- 2014 Small Time as Jerry
- 2014 The Longest Week as Bernard, the Chauffeur
- 2015 Bad Hurt as Marty
- 2015 Joy as Rudy's Attorney
- 2017 Breakable You as Dr. Chazen
- 2019 The Irishman as Ewing King
- 2020 Arkansas as Old Greek
- 2025 Eternity as Old Larry Cutler

=== Television ===
Barry Primus television credits
Year	Title	Role	Notes
1977	The Streets of San Francisco	Inspector Dave Lambert	1 Episode
1981	Les Uns et les Autres		TV miniseries
1986	The Equalizer	Walter Wesley	Episode: "Out of the Past"
1986	Murder, She Wrote	Det. Sgt. Len Berger	Episode: "Menace, Anyone?"
1993	Law & Order	Gary Silver	Episode: "Extended Family"
1993	The X-Files	Robert Dorlund	1 episode
1998	The Practice	Porn Film Director Goodwin	1 episode
1999	Black and White	Priest	TV movie
2001	James Dean	Nicholas Ray	TV movie
2007	Boston Legal	Professor Jeffrey Benoit	Episode: "The Object of My Affection"
2011	The Trivial Pursuits of Arthur Banks	George Epstein	3 Episodes
