= Mistress (1992 film) =

1992 film by Barry Primus

- Theatrical release poster
- Directed by: Barry Primus
- Screenplay by: Barry Primus; J. F. Lawton
- Story by: Barry Primus
- Produced by: Meir Teper; Robert De Niro
- Starring: Danny Aiello; Jace Alexander; Robert De Niro; Martin Landau; Eli Wallach; Robert Wuhl
- Cinematography: Sven Kirsten
- Edited by: Steven Weisberg
- Music by: Galt MacDermot
- Production company: Tribeca Productions
- Distributed by: Rainbow Releasing
- Release date: July 24, 1992
- Running time: 110 minutes
- Country: United States
- Language: English
- Box office: $1,102,469

Mistress is a 1992 American comedy-drama film directed by Barry Primus in his directorial debut, and written by Primus and J. F. Lawton. It stars Robert Wuhl, Martin Landau and Jace Alexander, with Robert De Niro, Danny Aiello, Tuesday Knight, Eli Wallach, Sheryl Lee Ralph and Laurie Metcalf in supporting roles.

== Plot ==
A down-and-out Hollywood screenwriter and director named Marvin Landisman is working on cheaply-made instructional videos when his years-old script is read by Jack Roth, a has-been producer who offers to help Marvin to find investors for his movie.

Three men who are willing to put up the money are found: ruthless businessman Evan, disturbed war veteran Carmine, and eccentric millionaire George. However, each has a mistress whom he insists be cast in the film in exchange for his financial backing. The women are highly talented Beverly, alcoholic flight attendant Patricia, and perky but talentless Peggy.

Marvin is repeatedly asked to compromise his standards and change his script to accommodate these backers until the script becomes almost unrecognizable from its original form. The project also puts a strain on the marriage of Marvin and his long-patient wife Rachel.

Marvin's screenplay is a bleak story about a painter who dies by suicide, and was inspired by the case of an actor named Warren who abruptly ended his life by jumping off a building in the midst of making a film that Marvin was directing. Roth hires young Stuart Stratland to adapt the script for the investors' mistresses, but Stuart not only constantly enrages Marvin with his suggested changes, he also falls in love with Peggy and they have an affair.

When Marvin's wife demands that he grow up and move with her to New York, where she is opening a restaurant, he breaks up with her instead, giving his loyalty to a film that, as she puts it, nobody wants to see. On the verge of signing contracts, everything falls apart when Beverly discovers that the role that she expected to play has been drastically reduced in Peggy's favor.

Marvin is left alone. ...or at least until Jack Roth gets in touch again.

== Cast ==
Actor/Actress	Character
Robert De Niro	Evan Wright
Christopher Walken	Warren Zell
Danny Aiello	Carmine Rasso
Robert Wuhl	Marvin Landisman
Martin Landau	Jack Roth
Eli Wallach	George Lieberhoff
Sheryl Lee Ralph	Beverly Dumont
Jean Smart	Patricia Riley
Tuesday Knight	Peggy Pauline
Jace Alexander	Stuart Stratland, Jr.
Laurie Metcalf	Racel Landisman
Ernest Borgnine	Himself
Stefan Gierasch	Stuart Stratland, Sr.
Chuck Low	Bernie
Tim Bagley	Singing Student

== Reception ==
=== Critical response ===
Rotten Tomatoes gives the film a score of 72%, based on 18 reviews.Metacritic, which uses a weighted average, assigned the film score 63 out of 100, indicating "generally favourable" views.
