= Jackson (2008 film) =

- Directed by: J. F. Lawton
- Written by: J. F. Lawton
- Produced by: Ryan Pilon
- Starring: Barry Primus; Charlie Robinson; Steve Guttenberg; Debra Jo Rupp
- Cinematography: Jack Conroy
- Edited by: Roderick Davis
- Music by: Frankie Blue
- Release date: 2008
- Running time: 97 minutes
- Country: United States
- Language: English

Jackson is a 2008 American comedy-drama-musical film written and directed by J. F. Lawton and starring Barry Primus and Charlie Robinson.

== Synopsis ==
Jackson is about two homeless men in Los Angeles, Donald and Sam. At the start of the day Donald is given a $20 bill (also known as a "Jackson"). The film follows the two and shows their adventures throughout the day with this money, and features songs from various operas.

== Cast ==
- Barry Primus as Donald
- Charlie Robinson as Sam
- Steve Guttenberg as Businessman
- Debra Jo Rupp as Nice Lady

== Musical numbers ==
1. "Una furtiva lagrima" from Donizetti's Elixer of Love – Richard Brown and Shawnette Sulker
2. "Champagne Aria" from Mozart's Don Giovanni – Cedric Trenton Berry
3. "Habanera" from Bizet's Carmen – Elaa Lee Romani/ Chorus: Ariella Vaccarino, Aleta Braxton, Pilar Diaz, Tahlia McCollum
4. Sextet from Donizetti's Lucia di Lammermoor – Jennifer Suess, William Gorton, Michael Sokol, Fred Winthrop, Benjamin Von Atrops, Leberta Clark; Music performed by Remy Zero
5. Monologue by Ibn Hakia from Tchaikovsky's Iolanta – John R. Jackson
6. "O mio babbino caro" from Puccini's Gianni Schicchi – Gustavo Hernandez Jr.
7. "Va, pensiero" from Verdi's Nabucco – Socialists: Clamma Dale, Kimarie Torre, Lauren Lee
  Chorus: Laura Decher, Frances Garcia, Erin Neff, Sara MacBride, Gregory Stapp, Antoine Garth, Gary Murphy, Tom Oberjat, Raphaela Rose Primus
8. "Love Cannot Be" (written by J.F. Lawton)
9. "El Pueblo" – George Lawton and John Cross
10. "Vamos a la Fiesta" – Julie Griffin
11. "Abrabo" – Way Depp, Robidebs Okyeame, Paa Dogo and Brekete
12. "I Wish I Was in Dixie Land" – John B.J. Smith
13. "Downtown Birthday" (written by J.F. Lawton)

== Production details ==
Jackson was filmed mainly in Los Angeles with the exception of one scene shot in Kentucky.

== Awards ==
- 2009 Swansea Bay Film Festival
  - Best in Festival
- 2009 The Conscious Life Film Festival
  - Indigo Award
- 2009 Treasure Coast International Film Festival
  - Best Feature Film
  - Best Editing
- 2008 International Film Festival of South Africa
  - Best Feature Film
- 2008 Non Violent Film Festival
  - Best Feature Film
- 2008 Lakedance Film Festival
  - Audience Award for Best Feature Film
- 2008 Socal Film Festival
  - Best Feature Film
  - Best Director
  - Best Actor: Barry Primus
