= Casey Ryback =

Fictional character, created 1992

- Under Siege character
- Steven Seagal as Casey Ryback in Under Siege 2: Dark Territory
- First appearance: Under Siege (1992)
- Last appearance: Under Siege 2: Dark Territory (1995)
- Created by: J. F. Lawton
- Portrayed by: Steven Seagal

In-universe information
- Gender: Male
- Occupation: Culinary specialist U.S. Navy SEAL (ret.)
- Nationality: American

Casey F. Ryback (born August 6, 1953) is a fictional character and action hero from the Under Siege films of the 1990s. Played by Hollywood action star Steven Seagal, Ryback is a chief petty officer, culinary specialist, and former Navy SEAL operator with top training in martial arts, explosives, special weapons, and tactics. He appears in the 1992 film Under Siege and its sequel, Under Siege 2: Dark Territory, in 1995.

== Biography ==
CPO (SEAL) Casey Ryback, USN (Ret.), was a decorated leader of SEAL Team Four until losing security clearance, demoted to cook aboard the USS Missouri. He struck his CO (Commanding Officer) after his SEAL teammates were killed because of poor intelligence during the invasion of Panama, Operation Nifty Package, in which they were sent to disable General Manuel Noriega's private jet at Punta Paitilla Airport.

At the end of the first film, his former position is given back to him in a ceremony following his bravery. At the beginning of the sequel, Ryback has retired from the Navy as a lieutenant, shown by the salute and verbal greeting from his driver in the beginning of the film. He worked as a chef at the Mile High Café in Denver, Colorado. According to his fictional Colorado's driver's license, he has brown eyes, black hair and he is 6 ft 5 in (1.96 meters) tall and weighs around 220 lbs (100 kilograms).

At the end of the second film, when Ryback visits his brother's grave, he wears Navy Dress Whites with the shoulder boards of a Navy Lieutenant (O-3). This means he was awarded a direct commission after the events of the first film. In the original poster art of the first film, he wears shoulder boards of a flag officer. Not enough is shown to see how many stars of admiral. In the first film, he has the rank of Chief Petty Officer.

As a SEAL, Ryback was awarded various U.S. military honors; they are listed as the Navy Cross, Silver Star and Purple Heart with clusters. Ryback would also have earned the Special Warfare insignia, and other decorations during his 20 years of service mentioned in the first film, including the Armed Forces Expeditionary Medal for operations in Panama, and most likely the Navy's Marksmanship Medals. The gold chief's stripes shown at the end of the first film also indicated multiple earning of the Navy's Good Conduct Medal.

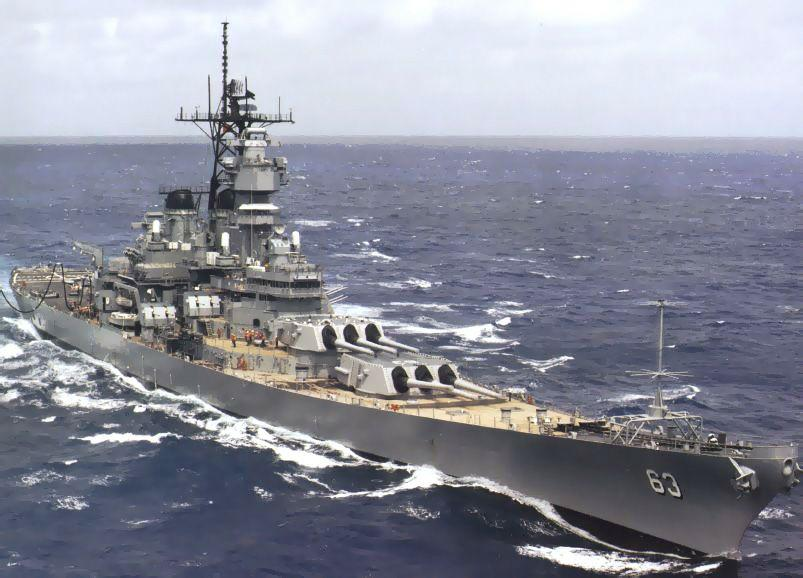
USS Missouri (BB-63)

In the first film, the mercenaries on the Missouri do not know who Ryback is, believing he was just a cook. However, in the sequel, Under Siege 2, in which Ryback boards a train with his niece Sarah (Katherine Heigl) to visit his recently deceased brother James (Sarah's father) in Los Angeles from Denver, the mercenaries who hijack the train have full knowledge of the man they are dealing with once they hear his name.

== Influence and reception ==
Casey Ryback became one of well known names of action heroes in the action film genre in the 1990s, compared to the likes of John McClane from the Die Hard films. The character has been criticized for his seeming invincibility and the ease with which he defeats his opponents, which precludes any element of surprise in his personal combat. As Eric Lichtenfeld writes, "Ryback...is the ultimate warrior. As the action genre tends toward hyperbole, Ryback is an amalgam of everything that signifies Ultimate Warrior status, even more than Riggs had been in Lethal Weapon. It is fitting then, that...Ryback's costuming progresses from a white cook's uniform...to an olive tank top, to the all-black garb that merges Ryback with the ship, and with which Seagal came to be identified.
