= Enid Nemy =

American reporter and columnist

Enid Nemy (born April 21, 1924) is a retired Canadian-American reporter and columnist for The New York Times for many years. She began at the Times in 1963, and remained for four decades before retiring. She was awarded the 1984 Matrix Award "for achievement in newspapers and wire services".

After retirement, she continued to pen the occasional obituary for such illustrissimi as Enid A. Haupt, Bill Blass, Eugene Lang, Lucille Lortel, Betsey Whitney, Patricia Buckley, Leona Helmsley, Elaine Kaufman, Larry Hagman, and Carol Channing, among others.

== Biography ==
Enid Nemy was born in Winnipeg, Manitoba in 1924. She attended United College and the University of Manitoba. She began her career with The Canadian Press, later working with the Canadian Broadcasting Corporation as well as the Bermudan Mid-Ocean News.

Nemy reported from Southeast Asia and accompanied President and Mrs. Reagan in 1982 to the European Summit meeting, and in 1984 to China. She was editor of Metropolitan Diary, a weekly column of stories submitted by New York Times readers. She wrote for other magazines and periodicals, and was known in literary circles for her often biting quotes.

Her affiliations have included:

- Dorothy Strelsin Foundation, President
- Lighthouse International (former board member)
- New York Newspaper Women's Club, member
- New York Newspaper Guild, member
- Women in Communications, member
- American Theatre Wing, board of trustees

== Marriage ==
Nemy was married to S. Ralph Cohen, a vice-president of the Scandinavian Airlines System, until his death in 1983. The union was childless.

== Centenary ==
Former colleague Clyde Haberman acknowledged Nemy's centenary on X on April 21, 2024, wishing her a happy 100th birthday.

== Writing ==
- Hot Potatoes, Doubleday; 1st edition (February 1, 1993); ISBN 0385468849, ISBN 978-0385468848

== Quotes ==
- "Even at the United Nations, where legend has it that the building was designed so that there could be no corner offices, the expanse of glass in individual offices is said to be a dead giveaway as to rank. Five windows are excellent, one window not so great." (Nemy)
