= J. F. Lawton =

American filmmaker (born 1960)

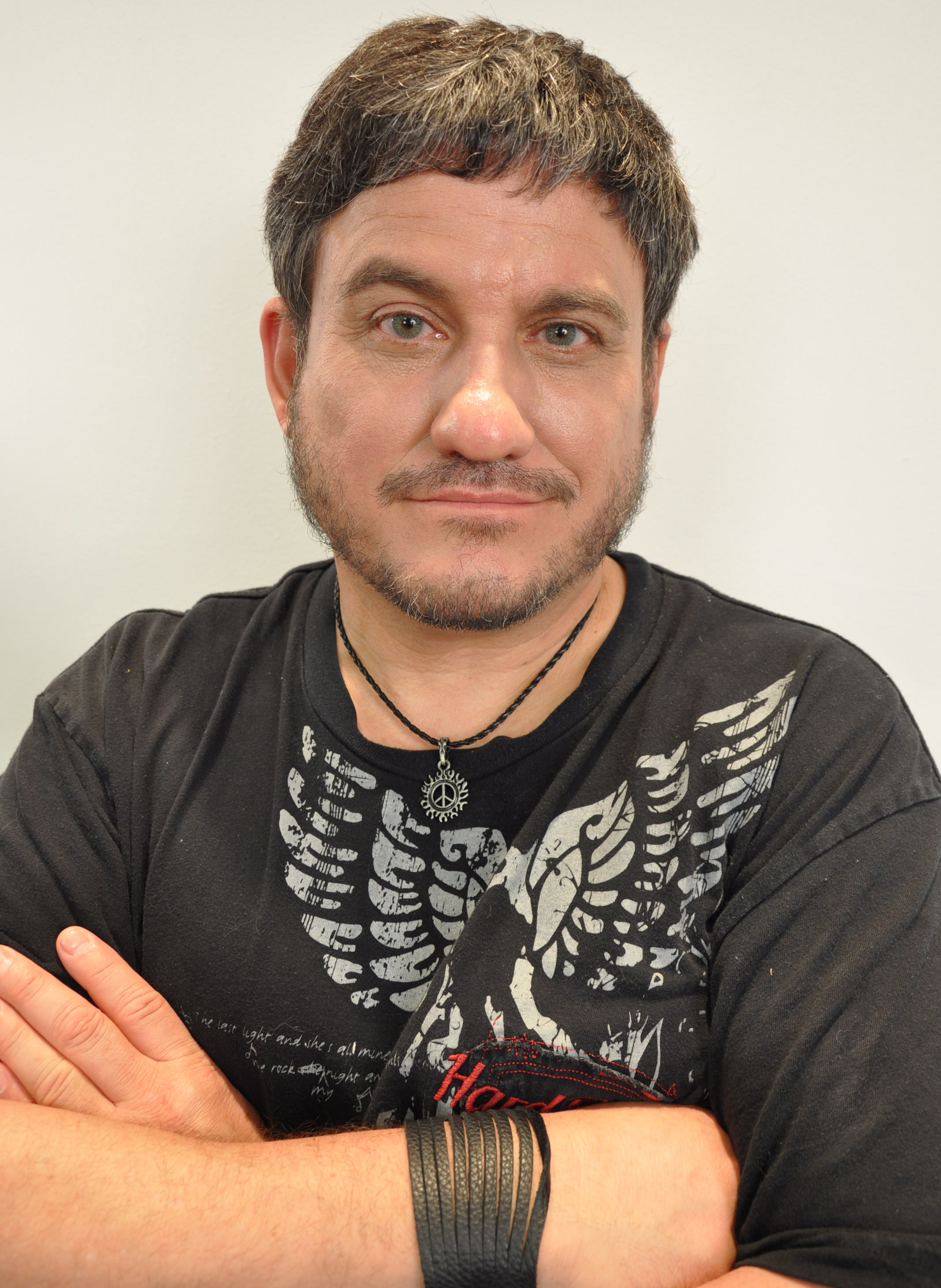
- J. F. Lawton in 2009
- Born: Jonathan Frederick Lawton; August 11, 1960 (age 66); Riverside, California, U.S.
- Occupations: Film director; producer; screenwriter
- Years active: 1989–present
- Spouse: Paola Lawton

Jonathan Frederick Lawton (born August 11, 1960) is an American screenwriter, producer, and director. His screen credits include the films Pretty Woman, Mistress, Blankman, Under Siege, Under Siege 2: Dark Territory, The Hunted, Chain Reaction, and Jackson, and the American television series V.I.P. Under the pseudonym J.D. Athens, Lawton wrote and directed the films Cannibal Women in the Avocado Jungle of Death and Pizza Man.

== Early life ==
J. F. Lawton is the son of author and novelist Harry Lawton and pianist Georgeann Leona Lawton (née Honegger). The couple met in Berkeley, California while attending the University of California. The couple later moved to Riverside, where Harry was hired as a reporter for The Press-Enterprise, and where J. F. was born.

As a child, J. F. Lawton had severe dyslexia, which made school life difficult. It took him many years of practice and hard work to manage his learning disability.

When Lawton was still in elementary school, his father's novel, Willie Boy: A Desert Manhunt, was made into a film starring Robert Redford. During the making of Tell Them Willie Boy Is Here, Harry would take J. F. to the set, exposing his son to the process of filmmaking. From that moment on, fascinated, Lawton determined that he would become a screenwriter. Always curious, Lawton would observe his surroundings and write about them, although due to his dyslexia, it would take him double the time to put his stories down on paper.

In high school, Lawton continued to write short stories, plays, and scripts. After graduating from John W. North High School in Riverside, he enrolled at California State University in Long Beach, to study filmmaking. There he wrote, directed, and edited two short films, The Artist and Renaissance. The first was a futuristic thriller in which the main character kills his victims, takes their pictures, and puts them in his art exhibitions. The second, Renaissance, was a short horror film in which a sadistic sexual predator dominates and kills his victim every night, but revives her the next morning only to start the cycle all over again. Both shorts won awards on the college film festival circuit.

== Career ==
=== 1980s ===
After college, Lawton moved to Los Angeles, settling near Hollywood Boulevard and Western Avenue, one of the areas of Los Angeles with the highest crime rate at the time. Living among prostitutes, pimps, drug users and dealers, and homeless people; the setting gave Lawton a wide range of inspiration for his stories. He wrote many screenplays while working at several post-production companies.

During this time, Lawton met producer Charles Band, for whom he would direct his first feature film. Cannibal Women in the Avocado Jungle of Death is a take-off of both Joseph Conrad's Heart of Darkness and Francis Ford Coppola's feature Apocalypse Now. Shot in less than two weeks in Lawton's hometown of Riverside, the film starred his longtime friend, comedian Bill Maher, Playboy Playmate Shannon Tweed and horror actress Adrienne Barbeau. It became a cult favorite and late-night cable staple.

After Cannibal Women in the Avocado Jungle of Death, Lawton also wrote and directed Pizza Man, a political satire about a pizza delivery man investigating a comical government conspiracy. Bill Maher also starred in the 1991 film Pizza Man, along with comedian Annabelle Gurwitch. In both movies, he used the pseudonym J.D. Athens.

=== 1990s ===
His script for the film Three Thousand was accepted by the Sundance Institute in the late 1980s. Executives at Touchstone Pictures, a division of Walt Disney Studios, became interested in making the movie. He changed the title to Pretty Woman, and with over $400 million in worldwide box office, the movie became the largest grossing live-action film in Disney history. Directed by Garry Marshall, with Richard Gere and Julia Roberts, the film is a story about Vivian Ward, a prostitute who is hired by a wealthy businessman, Edward Lewis, to be his escort for one week while he is in town on business. Although they come from different backgrounds and lifestyles, they end up developing a relationship based more on genuine love than money and convenience. Pretty Woman was a huge success and got Lawton nominated for a Writers Guild of America Award and a British Academy Award for his screenplay. Julia Roberts won a Golden Globe Award for her role and was nominated for an Academy Award for Best Actress.

Lawton was given an executive producer credit for his next original screenplay, Under Siege, based on his million-dollar spec script Dreadnought. The idea came when Lawton, who had served time in the United States Coast Guard Reserve, read that the Navy was retiring the USS Missouri (BB-63). The film stars Steven Seagal as a disgraced Navy Seal working as a cook on a battleship. Seagal's character must face off against a psychopathic ex-CIA agent (Tommy Lee Jones), who leads a group of mercenaries on a takeover of the battleship on its final voyage, so he can steal its arsenal of nuclear Tomahawk cruise missiles. A successful sequel followed: Under Siege 2: Dark Territory.

With Barry Primus, Lawton co-wrote Mistress, a comedy starring Robert De Niro, Danny Aiello, Christopher Walken and Martin Landau. The movie is about a Hollywood screenwriter, Marvin Landisman, whose career is going downhill until he meets a has-been hustler-producer who tries to help him revive his career. Starring an all-star cast, Mistress was one of the first films produced by TriBeCa Productions, Robert De Niro's production company; it was released in the summer of 1992.

Lawton worked with radio host and media personality Howard Stern on the script for The Adventures of Fartman, a fictional superhero character created by Stern for The Howard Stern Show. With two major studios willing to produce, the movie was put into hold due to a MPAA Film Rating System dispute, as Lawton and Stern felt the content of the film was better suited for a mature audience, and wanted an R-rating for the film instead of a PG-13 rating. The film was put on hold, and Howard Stern included a five-page Fartman story in comics form in his 1995 book, Miss America, which was based on Lawton's script. The book reached number one on The New York Times Best Seller list within days of its release.

For Columbia Pictures, Lawton co-wrote the 1994 film Blankman, a film starring and produced by Damon Wayans. (Wayans' character is Darryl – a nerdy, comical ghetto superhero with a pure heart, who fights criminals in his own style.)

Lawton went on to write and direct The Hunted (1995), a thriller set in Japan starring Christopher Lambert, John Lone, and Joan Chen. Written and directed by Lawton, the movie traces Paul Racine, a computer-chip executive from New York on one of his many business trips to Tokyo. Local authorities and a legendary ninja cult get involved in an electric chase after a crime occurs in a hotel room. The Hunted was released on February 25, 1995, and distributed by Universal Studios. The score, featuring music by the acclaimed Japanese taiko troupe Kodo, was formally specified by Lawton.

Lawton's next film project was the action thriller Chain Reaction, which starred Morgan Freeman, Keanu Reeves, and Rachel Weisz. Filmed in Chicago, Illinois, the movie was released on August 2, 1996, and grossed over $60 million worldwide.

In 1998 Lawton created and executive produced the Sony Pictures Entertainment syndicated show V.I.P. which ran until 2002. The adventure series starred Pamela Anderson as Vallery Irons, a small-town girl who comes to Southern California looking for a break, when she stumbles into the glamorous role of heading up a Beverly Hills bodyguard agency called Vallery Irons Protection.

=== 2000s ===
In 2006, Lawton co-wrote for Paramount Pictures a film based on the video game series DOA: Dead or Alive, starring Eric Roberts, Jaime Pressly, and Devon Aoki.

Lawton wrote and directed the 2008 film Jackson, a comedy-drama-musical starring Barry Primus, Charlie Robinson, Steve Guttenberg, Debra Jo Rupp, and included performances by opera singers Ella Lee, Shawnette Sulker, Clamma Dale and others. The movie takes place on a single day involving two homeless men surviving on Los Angeles's Skid Row. Lawton wrote two songs for the movie, "Downtown Birthday" and "Love Cannot Be". Jackson was shot mainly in Downtown Los Angeles, except for one scene shot in Kentucky.

== Personal life ==
Lawton has dyslexia and ADHD, and advocates for charities related to those issues. He has expressed concern for environmental issues, human rights, cancer and poverty.

He is married to lawyer and producer Paola Lawton.

== Filmography ==
=== Film ===
==== Short films ====
Title	Director	Writer	Editor
The Artist	Yes	Yes	Yes
Renaissance	Yes	Yes	Yes

==== Feature films ====
Year	Title	Director	Writer	Notes
1989	Cannibal Women in the Avocado Jungle of Death	Yes	Yes	Credited as J. D. Athens
1990	Pretty Woman	No	Yes	
1991	Pizza Man	Yes	Yes	Credited as J. D. Athens
1992	Mistress	No	Yes	
1992	Under Siege	No	Yes	
1994	Blankman	No	Yes	
1995	The Hunted	Yes	Yes	
1996	Chain Reaction	No	Yes	
2006	DOA: Dead or Alive	No	Yes	
2008	Jackson	Yes	Yes	

=== Television ===
Year	Title	Director	Writer	Executive producer	Notes
1998–2002	V.I.P.	Yes	Yes	Yes	Directed 6 episodes, wrote 7 episodes

== See also ==
- List of directors
- List of people diagnosed with dyslexia
