= Under Siege 2: Dark Territory =

- Theatrical release poster
- Directed by: Geoff Murphy
- Written by: Richard Hatem; Matt Reeves
- Based on: Characters by J.F. Lawton
- Produced by: Arnon Milchan; Steven Seagal; Steve Perry
- Starring: Steven Seagal; Eric Bogosian; Katherine Heigl; Morris Chestnut; Everett McGill
- Cinematography: Robbie Greenberg
- Edited by: Michael Tronick
- Music by: Basil Poledouris
- Production companies: Warner Bros.; Regency Enterprises; New Regency Productions; Seagal/Nasso Productions
- Distributed by: Warner Bros.
- Release date: July 14, 1995
- Running time: 100 minutes
- Country: United States
- Language: English
- Budget: $60 million
- Box office: $104.3 million

Under Siege 2: Dark Territory is a 1995 American action thriller film directed by Geoff Murphy, starring Steven Seagal as the ex-Navy SEAL, Casey Ryback. Set on board a train traveling through the Rocky Mountains from Denver to Los Angeles, it is the sequel to the 1992 film Under Siege also starring Seagal. The title refers to the railroading term that the subject train was travelling through dark territory, a section of railroad track that has no train signals and in which communications between train dispatchers and the railroad engineers were impossible.

The film was produced by Seagal along with Arnon Milchan and Steve Perry. The film's cast also included Eric Bogosian, Everett McGill, Morris Chestnut, Peter Greene, Kurtwood Smith and Katherine Heigl. In addition to Seagal, Nick Mancuso, Andy Romano, and Dale Dye also reprised their roles from the first film. Although a modest commercial success, Dark Territory received mixed critical reception.

== Plot ==
Following his retirement from the U.S. Navy, Casey Ryback settles in Denver, where he runs a restaurant. When he receives news of the death of his estranged brother, James, in a plane crash, Casey meets James's daughter, Sarah, whom he will accompany to LA to attend his funeral. The two board the Grand Continental, a train traveling through the Rocky Mountains from Denver to LA. On board, they befriend a steward/porter named Bobby Zachs and the train's chefs.

As the train reaches the Rocky Mountains, a group of terrorists flags it down and murders the engineer and brakeman. The group, led by former U.S. government employee and computer genius Travis Dane and mercenary Marcus Penn, cut the train phone lines and take the passengers and staff hostage, herding them into the last two cars. Casey kills one terrorist, then slips away. For underground targets, Dane worked on Grazer One, a top-secret military satellite tectonic weapon. The military fired Dane, who later faked his suicide.

Dane threatens two former DoD colleagues with burning soldering irons in their eyes unless they reveal codes to take over Grazer. Despite their disclosures, they are thrown from the train over a deep valley after the codes are confirmed to work.

Middle Eastern terrorists have offered Dane $1 billion to destroy the Eastern seaboard by using Grazer to target a nuclear reactor located under the Pentagon. Dane demonstrates Grazer to investors by destroying a Chinese biological weapons facility that was passing itself off as a fertilizer production plant. After one investor offers an additional $100 million, despite the weapon's primary intention for subterranean targets, Dane destroys an airliner carrying the investor's ex-wife.

The U.S. government has difficulty locating Dane or Grazer. When officials destroy what they think is Grazer, Dane explains that the NSA's best satellite was destroyed. His location cannot be determined as long as the train keeps moving.

With Zachs's help, Casey takes matters into his own hands. He faxes a message to his restaurant, which relays it to Admiral Bates. Bates quickly understands that Dane and the terrorists are on the train and reluctantly approves a mission by two F-117 stealth aircraft to destroy the train.

Zachs discovers they are on the wrong tracks and on a collision course with the Nevada Petrol Express, a Southern Pacific unit tanker train carrying liquefied petroleum gas. Casey kills the mercenaries one by one and releases the hostages, but Dane uses his computer skills to find the F-117s and then re-targets Grazer to knock them out before they complete their mission. Aware of Casey's past, Penn uses Sarah as bait to lure him to a fight, but Casey gains the upper hand and breaks his neck.

Ryback finds Dane about to depart in a helicopter hovering over the train. When Dane informs Casey that there is no way to stop the satellite from destroying Washington, Casey shoots him. The bullet destroys his computer and injures Dane, who falls out of the window of the train. Control of the satellite is restored at the Pentagon, and it is destroyed by remote control one second before it would have fired on the Pentagon, just before the two trains collide.

The crash happens on a trestle, resulting in an explosion that destroys the bridge and kills Scotty, the mercenary driving the train. Ryback races through the exploding train, exits the carriage, and grabs a rope ladder hanging from the helicopter. Dane, who survived the gunshot and the crash, also catches onto the ladder. He hangs onto the helicopter, begging Casey to save him, but Casey shuts the door, severing Dane's fingers and sending him falling to his death.

Casey informs the Pentagon that the passengers are safe, having previously detached the last two cars from the rest of the train. Later on in LA, Sarah and Casey pay their final respects at James's gravestone.

== Cast ==
- Steven Seagal as Lieutenant Casey Ryback, a former Navy SEAL who now heads and manages a restaurant in Denver
- Eric Bogosian as Travis Dane, a crazed computer genius, cyberterrorist leader who designed the Grazer One satellite weapon for the US government before being dismissed for his mental instability
- Everett McGill as Marcus Penn, the mercenary commander and Dane's second-in-command who leads a team of mercenaries to hijack the Grand Continental train to set up the satellite equipment
- Katherine Heigl as Sarah Ryback, Casey's estranged niece whom he accompanies on the journey to her father's funeral
- Morris Chestnut as Bobby Zachs, an eager porter of the train who reluctantly helps Ryback with the hijacked train
- Nick Mancuso as Tom Breaker, the shady CIA director who assists ATAC on Grazer One
- Brenda Bakke as Captain Linda Gilder, a member of ATAC and one of Dane's former colleagues
- Peter Greene as Mercenary #1, Penn's lieutenant who was once instructed by Ryback at Fort Bragg
- Patrick Kilpatrick as Mercenary #2, One of Penn's mercenaries
- Scott Sowers as Mercenary #3, One of Penn's mercenaries
- Afifi Alaouie as Fatima, the sole female of Penn's mercenaries
- Andy Romano as Admiral Bates, Chairman of the Joint Chiefs of Staff
- Dale Dye as Captain Nick Garza, Admiral Bates's right-hand man
- Kurtwood Smith as Major General Stanley Cooper, an Air Force general who commands ATAC and Dane's former boss
- David Gianopoulos as Captain David Trilling, a member of ATAC and one of Dane's former colleagues
- Sandra Taylor as Kelly, a barmaid on board the train
- Jonathan Banks as Scotty, the mercenary driver under the orders of Penn to drive the locomotive of the Grand Continental train
- Royce D. Applegate as Ryback's cook who runs the restaurant when Ryback is absent
- Dale Payne as Train Conductor

== Production ==
=== Development ===
The film was an early credit for Matt Reeves who wrote the script with Richard Hatem, a college friend. Reeves later said: "There was a big action spec market, a lot of movies that were selling, and so we wrote this movie with my thought being, 'And then I will be able to finance my student film and that way I can become a director'." The script was called Dark Territory at one stage and End of the Line at another. When they finished writing it "the spec market crashed and it didn't sell." But the script was optioned by Warner Bros. Pictures, who decided to turn the film into a sequel to Under Siege.

Reeves said the film was originally "meant to be very much like a Die Hard movie, which I guess Under Siege really was too, except the difference was that in the Under Siege movies that tension is how soon before Seagal will rip out someone's larynx. And what I love about Die Hard was this idea of the underdog, that here's this guy, especially in that first movie, who's a cop from New York who doesn't even have shoes. And somehow he has got to save this building, save the day. That was what that movie was supposed to be, but it didn't end up being that."

Gary Busey, who had played the main villain in the first Under Siege, was signed to the second movie for a salary of $750,000. As his character died in the first film, to not impact the film's continuity, Busey ultimately did not film any scenes and was paid his full contract.

=== Filming ===
According to Morris Chestnut, Seagal rewrote many of the scenes he was in. "The only time they really stuck to the script or had ad libs was the stuff when he really wasn't there. It was a lot of stuff, because at that time I think he was flying a helicopter, he was doing something... He would come to set, "Okay, you're gonna say this. I'm gonna say this and this is gonna happen and then you do that." That's how we did a lot of that movie." Part of the film was shot in Chatsworth's Stony Point Park. The production painted some of the boulders, which upset rock climbers who claimed it made them unsafe. The locomotive seen in the film had previously appeared in the 1985 film Runaway Train. Director Geoff Murphy called making the film "a very dreary process and very highly contentious at the time – lots of arguments and stuff. There was a point during the editing where I observed this incredibly high energy beast emerging, and I didn't know where it had come from, because there wasn't any of that energy on the set. It seemed to grow out of the editing process."

In a 2007 interview, Eric Bogosian related that he had a desire to play a "big, old fat villain in a big action movie" after seeing Alan Rickman's performance in Die Hard (1988). He noted that with this film, Murphy encouraged him to "get silly with the role", which turned out to fit him well.

== Reception ==
=== Box office ===
Under Siege 2 opened at #2 at the box office under Apollo 13 in 2,150 theaters and made $12,624,402 for the weekend.

=== Critical response ===
On Rotten Tomatoes, the review aggregation website, the film has an approval rating of 31% based on 32 reviews. The site's critical consensus states: "Utterly forgettable and completely unnecessary, Under Siege 2 represents a steep comedown from its predecessor – and an unfortunate return to form for its star". On Metacritic, the film has a score of 52 out of 100 based on reviews from 21 critics, indicating "mixed or average reviews". Audiences polled by CinemaScore gave the film an average grade of "A−" on an A+ to F scale.

Roger Ebert of the Chicago Sun-Times gave the film a three-star rating in his review, while Peter Rainer of the Los Angeles Times wrote that "the action upstaged the actors". Leonard Klady of Variety magazine noted Seagal's confidence, but said that he is betrayed by his limited performance. Klady praised the villains for their performances, but said that "they and others are saddled with pedestrian dialogue and motivation".

=== Legacy ===
Seagal was later criticized for his behavior during the film. Jenny McCarthy unsuccessfully auditioned for a role in the film. She said Seagal auditioned her and asked her to take off her clothes. Katherine Heigl, who was 16 at the time the film was made, said that on the last day of filming Seagal told her, "'You know, Katie, I got girlfriends your age.' And I said, 'Isn't that illegal?' And he said, 'They don't seem to mind'."

== Franchise ==
=== Sequel ===
In October 2016, Seagal announced that a script for a third film was being written by Woodie Mister. By December of that year, Mister stated that the script was completed and whether it moved forward was up to Seagal and studio executives. The pair collectively stated that the project would be a joint-venture production between Steamroller Productions and eAtlantica Productions.

=== Reboot ===
In November 2021, it was announced that the reboot of the original film series was in development. Timo Tjahjanto would direct, with a script written by Umair Aleem, based on an original story co-written by the pair. The project would be a joint-venture production between Warner Bros. Pictures and Max Original Films, and was intended to be released exclusively via streaming on HBO Max. Production was expected to commence after the completion of Tjahjanto's work on The Last Train to New York.
