= Under Siege =

1992 film by Andrew Davis

- Theatrical release poster
- Directed by: Andrew Davis
- Written by: J. F. Lawton
- Produced by: Arnon Milchan; Steven Reuther; Steven Seagal
- Starring: Steven Seagal; Tommy Lee Jones; Gary Busey
- Cinematography: Frank Tidy
- Edited by: Don Brochu; Robert A. Ferretti; Dov Hoenig; Dennis Virkler
- Music by: Gary Chang
- Production companies: Warner Bros.; Regency Enterprises; Le Studio Canal +; Alcor Films
- Distributed by: Warner Bros.
- Release date: October 9, 1992
- Running time: 103 minutes
- Country: United States; France
- Language: English
- Budget: $30 million
- Box office: $156.6 million

Under Siege is a 1992 action thriller film directed by Andrew Davis and written by J. F. Lawton. It stars Steven Seagal (who also produced the film), Tommy Lee Jones, Gary Busey, and Erika Eleniak. Seagal plays Casey Ryback, a former Navy SEAL, who must fend off a group of mercenaries after they commandeer the U.S. Navy battleship Missouri.

Released on October 9, 1992, Under Siege was both a critical and commercial success, receiving two Academy Award nominations for sound production and grossing over $156.6 million at the global box office. It is often considered Steven Seagal's best film to date. It was followed in 1995 by a sequel, Under Siege 2: Dark Territory, which was not as well received.

Under Siege was the final film of actor Patrick O'Neal, before his death in 1994.

== Plot ==
The battleship USS Missouri (BB-63) arrives at Pearl Harbor, where President George H. W. Bush announces that the ship will be decommissioned in California. Casey Ryback, a CPO and a culinary specialist, is preparing meals to celebrate CO Captain Adams' birthday, against the orders of executive officer Commander Krill, who has arranged for food and entertainment to be brought by helicopter. Krill provokes a tussle with Ryback. Unable to imprison Ryback in the brig without the captain's approval, Krill detains him in the walk-in fridge, placing Marine Private Nash on guard. The helicopter arrives with a musical band and caterers, accompanied by Playboy Playmate Jordan Tate.

The band and caterers are mercenaries employed by disillusioned former CIA operative William Strannix, who takes over the ship, killing several officers. The takeover is aided by Krill, who murders Captain Adams. The surviving crew is imprisoned in the forecastle. Ryback hears the gunshots and persuades Nash to call the bridge. Strannix sends two mercenaries to eliminate Ryback and Nash. Nash is killed, but Ryback kills both mercenaries. He encounters Tate and reluctantly allows her to tag along.

Strannix and his mercenaries seize the ship's weapon systems, shooting down a jet sent to investigate; they plan to cover their escape with missiles to obliterate tracking systems in Pearl Harbor. Strannix's mission is to hijack the ship's Tomahawks and load them onto a hijacked North Korean submarine. The Tomahawks would then be sold on the black market to an anti-American nation, likely instigating the Third World War as part of a master plan – Strannix's revenge for an attempted CIA assassination and to make Krill so rich he could "buy the presidency".

Strannix contacts Admiral Bates at the Pentagon to make demands, but learns Ryback has escaped. Krill discovers Ryback is a former Navy SEAL with extensive training in counterterrorism tactics; Captain Adams had taken Ryback aboard as his cook after Ryback was demoted because he attacked a superior officer who provided inadequate intel for a failed mission in Panama. Strannix appears to recognize Ryback's name. Ryback contacts Bates, who says a Navy SEAL team is underway to retake the ship. Ryback, helped by Tate, moves throughout the ship, eliminating mercenaries one by one. Krill activates the fire suppression system to murder the prisoners with water and to draw out Ryback through an ambush, who will likely attempt a rescue.

Ryback and Tate release five imprisoned sailors, along with visiting WW2 veteran gunner's mate Calaway. They overcome the ambush and shut off the water flooding the forecastle. Ryback shuts down Missouri's weapon systems to allow incoming Navy SEALs to land, but the submarine crew shoots down the helicopter carrying the team. The Pentagon orders an air strike that will sink the Missouri. Strannix regains control of the ship's weapon systems and loads the Tomahawks onto the submarine. Aided by Calaway, Ryback fires on the submarine using the battleship's 16-inch guns, killing the pirates and Krill.

His main plan foiled, Strannix launches two retaliatory nuclear-tipped Tomahawks towards Honolulu. As the sailors retake the ship, Ryback enters the control room and encounters Strannix, who it is revealed previously served over Ryback as the latter recognizes him. Ryback kills Strannix in a knife fight and then uses the launch code disk to destroy the Tomahawk missiles. A jet obliterates one missile, and the other is deactivated; the Navy calls off its airstrike.

The remaining crew is released as the ship sails to San Francisco harbor. A funeral ceremony for Captain Adams is held aboard the Missouri, with Tate amongst the crew. Ryback salutes the captain's casket in his formal dress uniform with full decorations.

== Cast ==
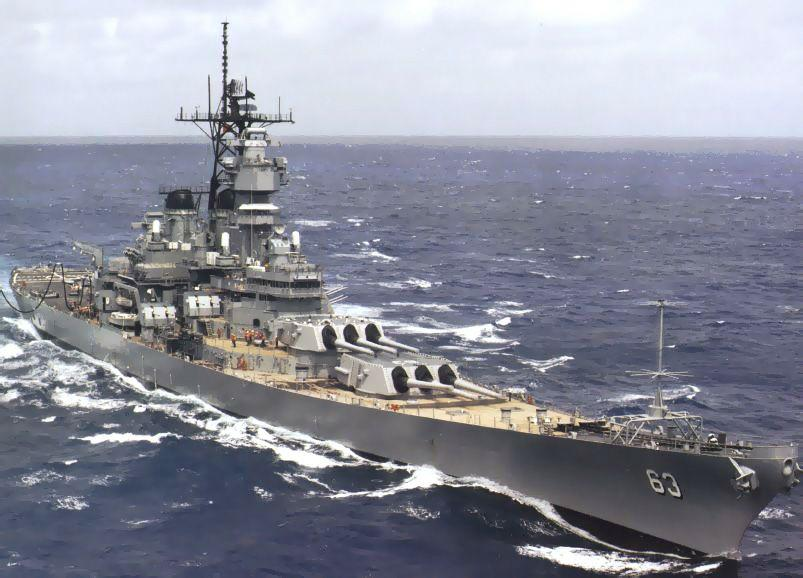
USS Missouri

- Steven Seagal as Chief Petty Officer Casey Ryback, a former Navy SEAL who serves as ship's cook on Missouri.
- Tommy Lee Jones as William Strannix, a renegade former CIA operative who leads the team of terrorists.
- Gary Busey as Commander Peter Krill, Missouri's executive officer who serves as an inside man and deputy of Strannix.
- Erika Eleniak as Jordan Tate, a Playboy Playmate model "Miss July '89" (the same as Eleniak was in real life) who comes on board to entertain the ship's personnel and becomes Ryback's sidekick.
- Colm Meaney as Ernest Daumer, Strannix's top lieutenant.
- Patrick O'Neal as Captain J.T. Adams, Commanding Officer of Missouri.
- Andy Romano as Admiral Bates, a high-ranking member of the Joint Chiefs of Staff.
- Dale Dye as Captain Nick Garza, Admiral Bates's advisor and a Navy SEAL who vouches for Ryback.
- Nick Mancuso as Tom Breaker, a high-ranking CIA agent and Strannix's former boss.
- Damian Chapa as Petty Officer 3rd Class Tackman, a sailor onboard Missouri.
- Tom Wood as Private Nash, a United States Marine onboard Missouri.
- Troy Evans as CPO Granger, a sailor onboard Missouri.
- Dennis Lipscomb as Trenton, National Security Advisor.
- Bernie Casey as Commander Harris, a high-ranking officer on Missouri.
- Glenn Morshower as Ensign Taylor, a junior officer who dislikes Ryback.
- Raymond Cruz as Ramirez, Ryback's assistant cook.
- Michael Welden as Lieutenant Ballard, a weapons officer on Missouri.
- Sandy Ward as Gunner's Mate Calaway, who served on Missouri during World War II.
- Richard Andrew Jones as Pitt, Strannix's technician.
- George Cheung as Kerr, Pitt's assistant.
- Kane Hodder as one of Strannix's commandos.

== Production ==
=== Development and pre-production ===
The film was based on an original spec script by J. F. Lawton called Dreadnought which sold for $1 million. Warner wanted Seagal to star in the film but he turned it down at first. Seagal later said he had problems with the Jordan Tate character, "who is at first a bimbo jumping out of a cake and gets paired up with me." But he said that in revisions of the script, she "gradually reveals her intelligence."

Lawton said "We are trying to make him [Seagal] more mainstream...getting him out of the pure action genre and into an acting role." The writer added "I'm trying to bring the budget within a reasonable range. The original script was almost irresponsible, with things like battleships getting blown up...the way it was, Dreadnought would have cost $100 million-plus to make. Now we're looking at the $30 million range... It was Steven's idea to fit the Pearl Harbor Memorial into the film, because all these incredible ships would be there—a spectacular sight."

Director Andrew Davis had previously made Above the Law with Steven Seagal. Davis later said "Terry Semel wanted us to get back together again saying that Seagal was only in the movie 41 minutes. Tommy Lee is in the movie longer than Steven. It was fine, it was fine. It worked out well. We had a nice time down in Mobile and had a lot of fun making the movie, and that was the movie that got me The Fugitive so it was worth it."

In a 2018 interview with The Hollywood Reporter, Pamela Anderson claimed that she was a contender for the role of Jordan Tate, but was dropped after refusing to sleep with Seagal. Busey claimed in later interviews that Seagal sexually harassed Eleniak on set, but she has denied that Seagal ever acted inappropriately with her during casting or filming.

=== Filming ===
USS Alabama in 2013.

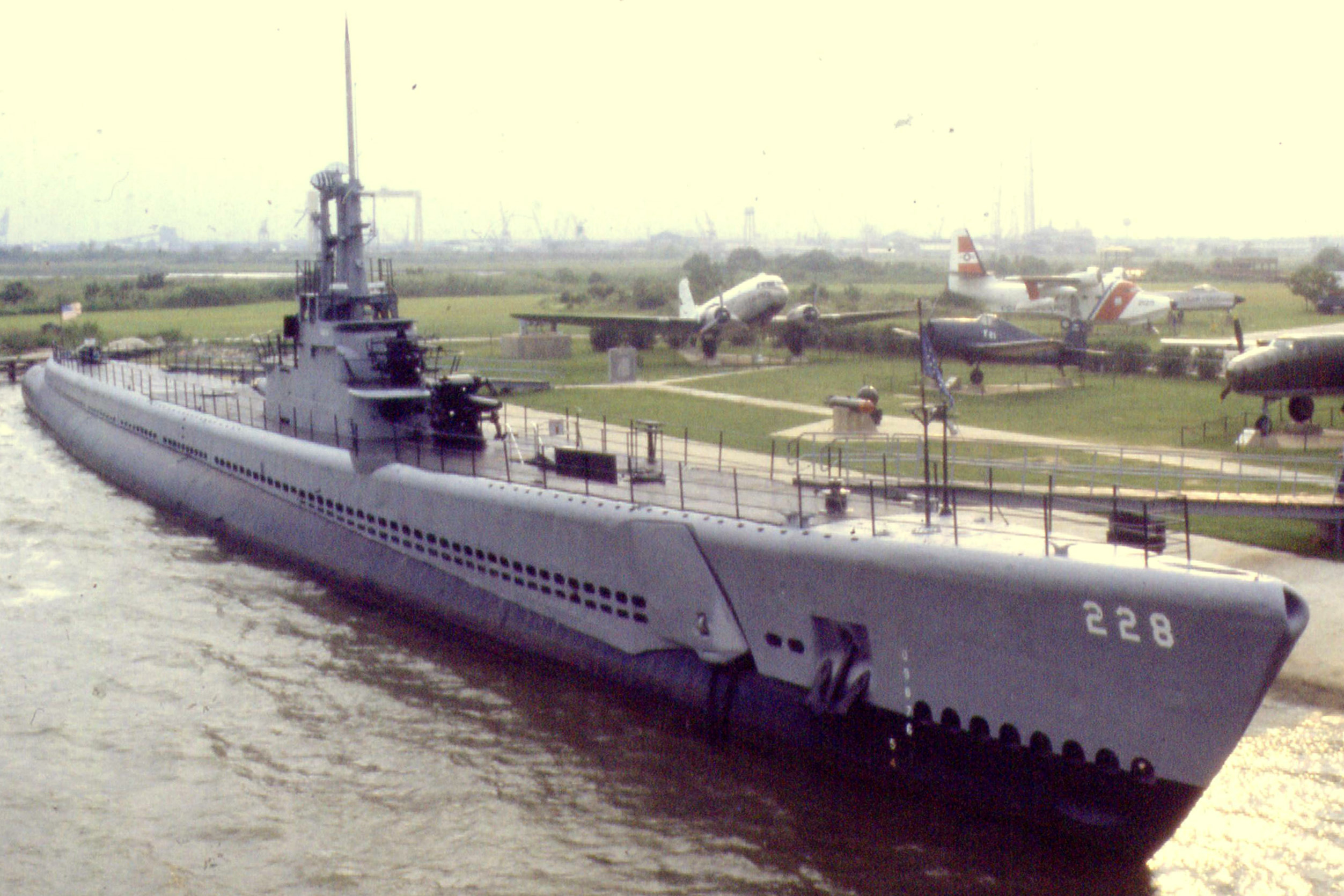
USS Drum in 1983.

USS Alabama (serving as a museum in Mobile) stood in for many of the Missouri sequences, and USS Drum (museum ship) portrayed the North Korean submarine. The film also featured footage of the real Missouri sailing in Pearl Harbor, the Pacific Ocean, and San Francisco Bay. The war room sequences were filmed inside of a set constructed in a local high school gymnasium.

The film makes extensive use of the Introvision process, a variation of front projection that allows realistic three-dimensional interaction of foreground characters with projected backgrounds without the heavy cost of traditional bluescreen effects. The technique was also used in the films Outland, Megaforce, Army of Darkness and Andrew Davis' later film, The Fugitive.

"Most people are surprised that the film is as sophisticated as it is," Davis said. "It appeals to people who have a point of view about nuclear weapons and the story thrusts you into an incredible situation that is not far-fetched." When the original title Dreadnought did not test well with audiences, the marketing department wanted to give the film a three-word title like other Seagal films. They came up with Last to Surrender, which Lawton and Seagal hated. Seagal fought to have it changed, and the film ended up being called Under Siege.

Robert Booth Nichols, a self-described former espionage agent, alleged mob associate, and con artist, was employed by Seagal as a technical advisor. He also appears in the film in a small speaking role.

== Reception ==
=== Box office ===
On its opening weekend, Under Siege made $15,760,003 from 2,042 theaters, with a $7,717 average. From there, it went on to make $83,563,139. Worldwide, it made $156,563,139. At the time, it was the most successful film that had not been screened for any critics prior to its release.

=== Critical response ===
Reviewers praised Tommy Lee Jones and Gary Busey's performances as the film's villains. Rotten Tomatoes gives the film a score of 84% based on reviews from 31 critics. The site's consensus states: "A well-directed action thriller that makes the most of its confined setting, Under Siege marks a high point for early '90s action—and its star's spotty filmography." This is one of the few Steven Seagal films to receive a fresh rating on Rotten Tomatoes, along with Executive Decision and Machete, being called "Die Hard on a battleship" by film critics. On Metacritic, the film has a weighted average score of 58 out of 100 based on 17 critics, indicating "mixed or average reviews". Audiences polled by CinemaScore gave the film an average grade of "A−" on an A+ to F scale.

It was also the only Seagal movie to receive an Academy Award nomination, earning two nominations for Best Sound Effects Editing (John Leveque and Bruce Stambler) and for Best Sound (Donald O. Mitchell, Frank A. Montaño, Rick Hart and Scott D. Smith). It did not win in either category, losing to Bram Stoker's Dracula and The Last of the Mohicans. Harrison Ford saw a rough cut of the film and approved director Andrew Davis for The Fugitive (1993).

It is often considered Steven Seagal's best film to date.

== Franchise ==
=== Sequel ===
A sequel, Under Siege 2: Dark Territory, was released on July 14, 1995, with Seagal, Romano, Mancuso and Dye reprising their roles. The film failed to replicate the success of its predecessor.

=== Reboot ===
In November 2021, a reboot of the original was in development for HBO Max, with Timo Tjahjanto and Umair Aleem attached to direct and write the film.

== See also ==
- List of films featuring the United States Navy SEALs
