= Death Ship (The Twilight Zone) =

- The Twilight Zone episode
- Cruiser E-89 about to land
- Episode no.: Season 4 Episode 6
- Directed by: Don Medford
- Written by: Richard Matheson
- Based on: "Death Ship" by Richard Matheson
- Production code: 4850
- Original air date: February 7, 1963

Guest appearances
- Jack Klugman; Ross Martin; Fred Beir; Mary Webster; Ross Elliott; Sara Taft; Tammy Marihugh

Episode chronology
← Previous "Mute"	Next → "Jess-Belle"
- The Twilight Zone (1959 TV series) (season 4)

"Death Ship" is an episode of the American television anthology series The Twilight Zone, based on a 1953 short story with the same title by Richard Matheson. The story was inspired by the legend of the Flying Dutchman. In this episode, a spaceship crew discovers a wrecked replica of their ship with their own dead bodies inside.

== Opening narration ==
Picture of the spaceship E-89, cruising above the 13th planet of star system 51, the year 1997. In a little while, supposedly, the ship will be landed and specimens taken: vegetable, mineral, and if any, animal. These will be brought back to overpopulated Earth, where technicians will evaluate them, and if everything is satisfactory, stamp their findings with the word 'inhabitable' and open up yet another planet for colonization. These are the things that are supposed to happen.

Picture of the crew of the spaceship E-89: Captain Ross, Lieutenant Mason, Lieutenant Carter. Three men who have just reached a place which is as far from home as they will ever be. Three men who in a matter of minutes will be plunged into the darkest nightmare reaches of the Twilight Zone.

== Plot ==
The Space Cruiser E-89, crewed by Captain Paul Ross, Lt. Ted Mason, and Lt. Mike Carter, is on a mission to analyze new worlds and discover if they are suitable for colonization. While orbiting a planet, Mason sees a metallic glint in the landscape. He conjects that this might be a sign of alien life, but Captain Ross disagrees. Nevertheless, the Cruiser prepares to land next to the mysterious object.

After landing, the men find that the gleaming comes from the wreck of a ship exactly like their own. Inside the craft, they discover their own lifeless bodies. Mason and Carter go numb with shock. Ross, struggling for an explanation, decides they have bent time in such a way as to get a glimpse of the future. He says to avoid their fate they must refrain from taking off again. Mason and Carter fiercely object to this plan, especially once they find that atmospheric interference prevents their contacting anyone for help, and that the frigid night-time temperatures of the planet will force them to rapidly exhaust the ship's energy reserves on heat. Ross pulls rank to make them comply.

While looking out the viewport, Carter is transported back to a country lane on Earth. There, he encounters people from his past. He runs to the house that his wife and he shared, and finds it empty except for a telegram notifying her that he has died in the line of duty. Carter is wrenched from his vision by Ross; as Carter describes what he has just experienced, he realizes that the people he encountered are dead. Ross insists it was a delusion. The two then find Mason has vanished. He is having an emotional reunion with his wife and child. When Ross pulls him back, Mason is enraged and wants to be allowed back, maintaining that his encounter with his family was real. From Mason's pocket, Ross pulls a newspaper clipping about the death of Mason's wife and child. The captain then posits a new theory about what is going on: The planet is inhabited by telepathic aliens who are using illusions to keep them from reporting back to Earth, thus averting colonization of their home. Ross says that if they take the E-89 back up to space, that should break the spell.

The men take E-89 back into orbit. Mason and Carter admit that Ross may have been right about the aliens. Ross then insists on landing the craft again to gather foreign samples to bring back to Earth. When they land again, the wreck of their craft is still present. The successive disproving of Ross's theories, combined with an intuitive knowledge of their condition, brings Mason and Carter to the realization that they already crashed and are dead. Their afterlife visits were real, and their current situation is the illusion. Ross refuses to accept this. He rejects his crew's pleas to be allowed to embrace their deaths and be reunited with their loved ones, and says that they will "go over it again and again" until he figures out an alternative explanation.

The scene then resets to the moment where Mason first spotted the E-89's wreckage, the crew doomed to repeat the past several hours of investigation forever or until the captain finally accepts the truth.

== Closing narration ==
Picture of a man who will not see anything he does not choose to see, including his own death. A man of such indomitable will that even the two men beneath his command are not allowed to see the truth; which truth is, that they are no longer among the living, that the movements they make and the words they speak have all been made and spoken countless times before, and will be made and spoken countless times again, perhaps even unto eternity. Picture of a latter-day Flying Dutchman, sailing into the Twilight Zone.

== Production notes ==
The model of the hovering spaceship is that of a C-57D Cruiser, a leftover prop from MGM's 1956 film Forbidden Planet. The crashed ship was a realistically painted model/set. The prop was also used in the 1960 Twilight Zone episodes "The Monsters Are Due on Maple Street" and "Third from the Sun".

A crew member shirt, also used in the episode "On Thursday We Leave for Home", was offered at auction in late September 2015 by Profiles in History with an estimated value of $1,000 to $1,500, with a winning bid of $1,600 by Mathew G. Perrone, a private collector.

== Cast ==
- Jack Klugman as Capt. Paul Ross
- Ross Martin as Lt. Ted Mason
- Fred Beir (as Fredrick Beir) as Lt. Mike Carter
- Mary Webster as Ruth Mason
- Ross Elliott as Kramer
- Sara Taft as Mrs. Nolan
- Tammy Marihugh as Jeannie Mason

== Sources ==
- DeVoe, Bill. (2008). Trivia from The Twilight Zone. Albany, GA: Bear Manor Media. ISBN 978-1-59393-136-0
- Grams, Martin. (2008). The Twilight Zone: Unlocking the Door to a Television Classic. Churchville, MD: OTR Publishing. ISBN 978-0-9703310-9-0
