= The Young Warriors =

The Young Warriors may refer to:

- The Young Warriors (film), a 1967 television film based on Richard Matheson's The Beardless Warriors
- The Young Warriors (TV series), a 2006 Chinese television series
