= Born of Man and Woman (short story collection) =

Short story collection by Richard Matheson

- First edition cover
- Author: Richard Matheson
- Cover artist: Mel Hunter
- Language: English
- Genre: Science fiction and fantasy stories
- Publisher: Chamberlain Press
- Publication date: 1954
- Publication place: United States
- Pages: 252

Born of Man and Woman is the first collection of science fiction and fantasy stories by Richard Matheson, published in hardcover by Chamberlain Press in 1954. It includes an introduction by Robert Bloch. A truncated edition, dropping four stories, was published by Bantam Books in 1955 as Third from the Sun.

== Contents ==
- "Born of Man and Woman" (F&SF 1950)
- "Third from the Sun" (Galaxy 1950) - this story was the basis of The Twilight Zone episode of the same name.
- "Through Channels" (F&SF 1951)
- "Lover, When You’re Near Me" (Galaxy 1952)
- "SRL Ad" (F&SF 1952)
- "Mad House" (Fantastic 1953)
- "F---" (Thrilling Wonder Stories 1952)
- "Dear Diary" (original)
- "To Fit the Crime" (Fantastic 1952)
- "Witch War" (Startling Stories 1951)
- "Return" (Thrilling Wonder Stories 1951)
- "Dress of White Silk" (F&SF 1951)
- "Full Circle" (Fantastic Universe 1953)
- "Disappearing Act" (F&SF 1953)
- "The Wedding" (Beyond Fantasy Fiction 1953)
- "Shipshape Home" (Galaxy 1952)
- "The Traveller" (original)

"F---" was originally published as "The Foodlegger".

== Reception ==
The New York Times reviewer J. Francis McComas characterized Matheson as "an established producer of the violently disturbing" and described the "scintillating" collection as "a stimulating look at a genuine artist at work." P. Schuyler Miller, noting that all the stories had been relatively recently published, praised Matheson as "one of the best of the newer writers."
