= Lee Chambers =

Canadian writer and film director (born 1970)

- Born: 4 February 1970 (age 56)
- Education: Leeds Metropolitan University
- Occupations: Writer, film director, and producer

Lee Chambers (born 4 February 1970) is a British-Canadian writer, film director, and producer. In 2012 he won the Best Screenwriter award from Northern Ontario Music and Film Awards for his Australian short film, Hugh Jackman Saves the World.

== Early life ==
Born and raised in Canada, Chambers has dual British and Canadian citizenship. He graduated from the Northern Film School at Leeds Beckett University in the UK and also holds credentials in graphic design, advertising and education.

== Career ==
Chambers has worked on numerous British sitcoms, including BBC's The League of Gentlemen, as well as major motion pictures in the UK and Australia, and comedies for the CBC in Canada.

His debut feature, The Pineville Heist and short film Copenhagen Road, can be seen on Amazon Prime. His creative work has been awarded at hundreds of festivals, including a nomination for Best Director sponsored by the Director's Guild of Canada (Ontario).

Along with filmmaking, Chambers is also a motivational speaker, panel moderator, and juror at film festivals in the USA, Canada, Australia, England, Portugal, Iraq, and the Cayman Islands.

== Bibliography ==
- I've Had Just About Enough of Ewe (1994)
- The Pineville Heist (2011)
- The Sum of Random Chance (2012)
- Conviction: A Screenplay Thriller (2023)

== Filmography ==
Previous and current film attachments
Title	Year	Role	Format	Status
On the Roof	1996	Director	Short	Released
Distress Signals	1998	Producer, director	Short	Released
Snack Related Mishaps	1999	Writer, director	Short	Released
Cone of Ignorance	2001	Writer, director	Short	Released
Smoke Yourself Thin	2002	Writer, director	Short	Released
Lost and Profound	2005	Writer, producer, director	Short	Released
Chasing Mascots	2006	Producer	Short	Released
Thornob: The Caveman Inventor	2006	Writer, producer, director	Short	Released
G8	2007	Producer	Short	Released
The Plan	2008	Producer	Short	Released
When Life Gives You Lemons	2010	Co-writer, director	Short	Released
Eyes on the Road	2011	Co-writer, director	Short	Released
Hugh Jackman Saves the World	2013	Co-writer, director	Short	Released
The Reckoning	2014	Associate Producer	Feature	Released
The Pineville Heist	2015	Co-writer, director	Feature	Released
Copenhagen Road	2019	Co-writer, director	Short	Released
The Devil Knows You're Dead	2020	Writer, director	Short	Released
Hell in a Handbasket	2021	Writer, director	Short	Released
Wicked Plans	2022	Writer, director	Short	Released

== Awards ==
- Best Screenwriter of the Northern Ontario Music and Film Awards (2012)
- 2nd Best Screenplay of the Canada International Film Festival (2011)
