= What Dreams May Come (Matheson novel) =

1978 novel by Richard Matheson

- First edition
- Author: Richard Matheson
- Language: English
- Genre: Bangsian fantasy
- Publisher: G. P. Putnam's Sons
- Publication date: September 1978
- Publication place: United States
- Media type: Print (Hardback & Paperback)
- Pages: 288 pp
- ISBN: 0-399-12148-X

What Dreams May Come is a 1978 novel by Richard Matheson. The plot centers on Chris, a man who dies then goes to Heaven, but descends into Hell to rescue his wife. It was adapted in 1998 into the Academy Award-winning film What Dreams May Come starring Robin Williams, Cuba Gooding Jr., and Annabella Sciorra.

Matheson stated in an interview, "I think What Dreams May Come is the most important (read effective) book I've written. It has caused a number of readers to lose their fear of death – the finest tribute any writer could receive."

In an introductory note, Matheson explains that the characters are the only fictional component of the novel. Almost everything else is based on research, and the end of the novel includes a lengthy bibliography.

== Background ==
Matheson, primarily known for horror fiction, wanted to move away from the genre. "I was determined to fight against this image. Dammit, I never wrote 'real' horror to begin with! To me, horror connotes blood and guts, while terror is a much more subtle art, a matter of stirring up primal fears. But, by the mid-seventies, I had tired of playing the fright game. Scaring the hell out of people no longer appealed to me." He based Chris's family in the novel on his own.

The title comes from a line in Hamlet's "To be, or not to be ..." soliloquy, that is,

For in that sleep of death what dreams may come
When we have shuffled off this mortal coil,
Must give us pause.

The plot outline in the novel contains several allegorical references to Dante Alighieri's epic poem The Divine Comedy (1308–1321).

== Main characters ==
- Chris Nielsen – the protagonist and main narrator, a middle-aged screenwriter who is killed in a car accident and spends most of the novel exploring the afterlife while searching for his wife Ann
- Robert Nielsen – Chris's living brother, narrator of frame story, to whom most of the novel is addressed
- Ann – Chris's wife who commits suicide due to grief over Chris's death
- Albert – Chris's cousin who acts as his guide in Heaven and whose work is to travel to the "lower realm" (i.e. Hell) to help its inhabitants
- Leona – a woman who guides Chris through a Heavenly city; Chris first mistakes her for Ann

== Plot summary ==
The prologue is narrated by a man telling of his visit from a psychic woman, who gives him a manuscript she claims was dictated to her by his deceased brother Chris. Most of the novel consists of this manuscript.

Chris, a middle-aged man, is injured in an auto accident and dies in the hospital. He remains as a ghost, at first thinking he's having a bad dream. Amid a failed séance that ends up reinforcing his wife's belief that he didn't survive death, an unidentified man keeps approaching Chris, telling him to concentrate on what's beyond. Chris disregards this advice for a long time, unable to leave his wife Ann. After following the man's advice, and focusing on pleasant memories, he feels himself being elevated.

He awakens in a beautiful glade, which he recognizes as a place where he and Ann traveled. Understanding now that he has died, he is surprised that he looks and feels alive, with apparently a physical body and sensations. After exploring the place for a while, he finds Albert, his cousin, who reveals himself as the unidentified man he had been seeing.

Albert explains that the place they occupy is called Summerland. Being a state of mind rather than a physical location, Summerland is practically endless and takes the form of the inhabitants' wishes and desires. There is no pain or death, but people maintain occupations of sorts and perform leisure activities. The book depicts Summerland at length, through Chris's eyes. Chris feels somehow uneasy, haunted by nightmares ending in Ann's death. Soon he learns that Ann has killed herself.

Albert, who is as shocked as Chris, explains that by committing suicide Ann has placed her spirit in the "lower realm" from Summerland, and that she will stay there for twenty-four years – her intended life span. Albert insists that Ann's condition is not "punishment" but "law" – a natural consequence of committing suicide.

Since Albert's job is to visit the lower realm, Chris asks to be taken there to help Ann. Albert initially refuses, warning Chris that he might find himself stuck in the lower realm, thus delaying his eventual, inevitable reunion with Ann. Chris eventually convinces Albert to attempt the rescue, though Albert insists that they will almost certainly fail.

The lower realm (which the book later refers to as "Hell") is cold, dark, and barren. Albert and Chris are able to use their minds to make their surroundings slightly more bearable, but Albert warns Chris that this will be harder to do the farther they travel. They eventually reach a place occupied by people who were violent criminals while alive. Chris witnesses a series of dreadful sights and is gruesomely attacked by a mob, though he soon discovers that the attack occurred only in his mind.

They finally depart from that violent section of Hell, arriving at last at Ann's place. It resembles a dark, depressing version of the neighborhood where he and Ann lived. Albert explains that she will not immediately recognize Chris, and that he should try gradually convincing her who he is and what has happened to her. Ann believes she is living alone in her house where nothing seems to work, grieving her husband's death. This is her private "Hell" – an exaggerated version of what she had been experiencing prior to her suicide.

Identifying himself as a new neighbor, Chris makes numerous unsuccessful attempts to help her realize the true situation. He describes details of his life so that she will be reminded of her husband. He calls her attention to the improbably negative conditions of the house. He drops clues, gradually leading her to the truth, but she seems to block out anything that will cause recognition. He finally tells her the truth straight out. She gets angry and calls him a liar. Because she does not believe in an afterlife, she finds the notion that he could be her dead husband literally unthinkable.

After a moment of disorientation where he starts to forget his own identity, the atmosphere of Hell gradually drawing him in and threatening to trap him there, he delivers a monologue of appreciation for her, detailing the ways in which she enriched his life. He then makes the most dreaded decision of all: He decides to stay with her and not return to Summerland. In his final moments before losing consciousness, Ann recognizes him and realizes what has happened.

Chris awakens in Summerland again. Albert, who is amazed that Chris was able to rescue Ann, informs him that she has been reborn on Earth, because she is not ready for Summerland. Chris wants to be reborn too, despite Albert's protests. Chris learns that he and Ann have had several past lives, and in all of them they had a special connection with each other.

As the manuscript comes to a close, Chris explains that he is soon going to be reborn and will forget all that has happened. He ends with a message of hope, telling his readers that death is not to be feared, and that he knows that in the future he and Ann will ultimately be reunited in Heaven, even if in a different form.

== Religious basis ==
Some Hindus claim that the beliefs presented in the novel conform to the teachings of Hinduism, though Matheson denied any direct influence. Raised a Christian Scientist, Matheson gradually developed what he called his own religion, taking elements from many sources. "As a Pisces," he explained, "I have been fascinated about parapsychology, metaphysics, and the supernatural ever since I was a teenager. The concepts in the book are derived from my wide range of reading." One of Matheson's influences was Harold W. Percival, an adherent of Theosophy, a belief system with a strong Eastern and Hindu influence.

The story also shares the same theme of the ancient Greek myth Orpheus and Eurydice, in which the gifted musician makes a challenging journey to Hell to retrieve his wife.

One character quotes from the writings of 18th century Christian mystic Emanuel Swedenborg. Matheson bases his descriptions of the death experience itself on studies by Elisabeth Kübler-Ross and Raymond Moody. When reading these accounts, Matheson found that revived suicides told a far more frightening story than anyone else who had near death experiences. Matheson's bibliography consists more of "New Age" material than mainstream religious sources, and the novel shows reincarnation as more voluntary than major world religions like Hinduism, Buddhism, and Jainism usually depict it.

== Major themes ==
The book explores a range of paranormal phenomena and advances a philosophy of mind over matter, arguing that the human soul is immortal, and that a person's fate in the afterlife is self-imposed.

When Chris dies, he experiences symptoms of a near death experience. As pain gradually leaves his body, he observes a tunnel of light and views his dead body from above, connected to himself by a silver cord. He then experiences his life flashing before his eyes, as the events in his life unfold in reverse. This last experience occurs again later, much more slowly, while he's a ghost. Albert later compares it to purgatory, a time when people are forced to re-examine their lives without rationalization.

Chris's family contacts a medium who can see but not hear Chris, and they conduct a séance. Chris tries to communicate with them, but tires and goes off to sleep. When he awakens, he is horrified to find himself staring at a figure of himself conversing with the family. The psychic is unknowingly feeding this figure some answers he expects to hear, unaware that he's not conversing with the real Chris. The novel later explains that the figure is the shedding of Chris's etheric body to release his spirit body, enabling him to ascend to Heaven, or Summerland.

Summerland, an environment shaped by the thoughts of the inhabitants, appears relatively Earth-like because that's what the newly dead are accustomed to. Communication is telepathic, travel instantaneous. There's no need to eat or sleep. The inhabitants, all of whom possess an aura, can spend time relaxing, studying, or working — though not for profit. There are scientists and artists, many of whom work to subtly influence the minds of Earth's inhabitants.

Albert, whom the novel identifies as Chris's guardian angel, explains that Summerland includes many things that inhabitants do not need — such as automobiles — but which exist simply because some people believe they are needed. The particular Heaven of each religion exists somewhere, because that is what members of each religion expect.

Albert cannot locate Ann until one of their sons prays. In the lower realm, Albert and Chris can no longer communicate telepathically and must travel by foot, but they are able to use their minds to influence the environment to a degree.

Everyone has had a multitude of past lives; some souls become so advanced, however, that they pass to a higher level where they ultimately become one with God. Reincarnation is a complex process in which one enters a baby's body, though not necessarily at birth.

== Reception ==
In its initial release in 1978, the book received mixed reactions from readers and critics. Many were upset by Matheson's departure from the horror genre, while others greatly appreciated the comforting effect it provided.

== Different editions ==
The 1998 edition, published to anticipate the movie's release, used cover art from the film, with an afterword by producer Stephen Simon (a.k.a. Stephen Deutsch) explaining how he came across the book, what it meant to him, and how it has changed many people's lives. The book had been out of print for years prior to the movie's release, but the 1998 edition, by Tor Books, reached the New York Times Best Seller List. Tor also published The Path, a nonfiction book in which Matheson expressed his own spiritual beliefs.

== Release details ==
1978, USA, Putnam Pub Group, ISBN 0-399-12148-X, September 1978, Hardcover

1998, USA, Tor Books, ISBN 0-8125-7094-4, October 1998, Paperback

1998, USA, Gauntlet Press 20th Anniversary Edition Limited Edition, ISBN 1887368175

2004, USA, Tor Books, ISBN 0-7653-0870-3, January 2004, Paperback

== See also ==
- Theosophy
- Spiritualism
- Astral plane
- Thoughtform
- Bid Time Return (a Richard Matheson novel with similar themes)
