= C-57D =

Fictional spaceship

United Planets Cruiser C-57D lands on Altair's 4th planet.

The United Planets Cruiser C-57D is a fictional starship featured in MGM's 1956 science fiction film Forbidden Planet. The design used for the starship is a flying saucer, inspired by the spate of UFO sightings during the 1950s, and which, in turn, inspired the look of the exterior saucer section and interior design of another iconic starship, Star Trek's USS Enterprise, as well as the Jupiter 2 spacecraft from the 1965 original television series Lost in Space.

== Forbidden Planet production ==
In the film's screenplay the starship carries no name, only the designation "United Planets Cruiser C-57D".

The saucer has a lenticular profile. Above there is a dome, approximately a third of the diameter of the lens. Below there is a shallow cylinder of about the same diameter, and a smaller dome that ostensibly houses the starship's faster-than-light drive engine and central gyroscopic landing pedestal. The precise contours and proportions differ slightly between the saucer's shooting miniatures, full-size sets, and matte paintings used in the film. Upon the depicted landing, the saucer's gangway and two conveyor-loading ramps swing down at an angle from the underside hull, near the edge of the lower lens shape.

The film's blueprints for the command deck depict a central circular "navigation center" with a transparent globe centered on a small model of the starship. Around this central space are a number of wedge-shaped rooms, including:

- A room with a curved table, chairs, and a space for books (presumably a galley and recreation room).
- A room with the "communications center", a chart table and the "main viewscope".
- A room with 16 bunk beds, with a pit and crane between it and the central area.
- A room with nine "decelerator platforms". The film shows the crew standing on these low, cylindrical platforms, enveloped within an opaque blue glow while the saucer decelerates from hyperdrive, but does not show whether these low platforms must also be used during the transition to faster-than-light speed.

On the starship's mezzanine level is an instrument station and other rooms that are not seen. The studio created a stage set of the interior command and mezzanine decks and a 60-ft (18 m) semicircular mock-up of the landed saucer's lower half (with the deployed central landing pedestal, gangway, and conveyor ramps). The sets suggest that the starship is somewhere between 100 and 175 ft (30 and 53 m) in diameter.

Three saucer miniatures were used, of 22 inches (56 cm), 44 inches (110 cm), and 82 inches (210 cm) or 88 inches (220 cm) in diameter, and costing an estimated total of $20,000. The largest miniature, constructed of wood, steel, and fiberglass, which contained the internal motors for the gangway, conveyor ramps, central landing pedestal, and glowing neon-red light engine, weighed 300 pounds (140 kg).

In 1970, MGM sold these miniatures as part of an MGM studio auction, but no record was kept of who bought the largest of the three. A North Carolina man originally bought it for $800, but had not realized its market value until 2008, when he offered the model for auction and it sold for $78,000.

== Appearances in The Twilight Zone ==
The three miniatures were reused in several episodes of Rod Serling's Twilight Zone television series, sometimes slightly altered for the appearance:

- 1960 "Third from the Sun" — The original navigation center is seen, as well as the starship.
- 1960 "The Monsters Are Due on Maple Street" — The movie saucer scene reused was optically reprinted but was shown flying upside down.
- 1961 "The Invaders" — A facsimile of the original saucer model, used for USAF Space Probe No. 1, was partially destroyed by the episode's sole (giant) character at the end of the episode.
- 1962 "To Serve Man"
- 1962 "Hocus-Pocus and Frisby"
- 1963 "Death Ship" — This episode makes the most extensive use of stock and new footage of the saucer; it is identified in the episode as the Space Cruiser E-89, patrolling the 51st star system in the year 1997. Here, the model saucer is shown using downward-directed rocket-thrust propulsion; the identical crashed saucer already on the ground is a separately created prop.
- 1963 "On Thursday We Leave for Home"
- 1964 "The Fear"

== Model kits ==
The C-57D was recreated as a large-scale miniature kit by Polar Lights in 2001 and was labeled as being a 1:72 scale, injection-molded, all-plastic model kit, which is 28 inches (71 cm), a scale of 168 feet (51 m) in diameter; 1:72 is a standard international plastic aircraft model scale. The kit included complete "under the dome" interior crew and command cabin details, including an additional clear top dome for showing off the starship's interior. Some fans and modelers have reported inconsistencies in the model's scale; for example, measurements of the included small Robby the Robot model indicate the kit is actually in a nonstandard kit scale of 1:56, giving the saucer's actual size as being 130 feet (40 m).

Polar Lights reissued the kit in a new box shape and with new box art in 2009, adding new figures of the starship's crew, Dr. Morbius' daughter Altaira and the monster from the Id. In 2013 Polar Lights issued two new, smaller 1:144 scale injection-molded plastic model C-57D kits: one kit features only the starship itself with no extras apart from its deployed central landing pedestal and ramps, while the other showcases a complete electronic lighting system for displaying the starship's "in flight" faster-than-light drive engine.

Over the years, various small "garage kit" model companies in both the United States and Japan have produced kits or finished desktop models of the saucer in a variety of sizes/scales, using both vacuum formed plastic and spin-cast resin parts, sometime both in combination. Aftermarket interior detail decals and photo-etched metal detail parts, and interior and drive-engine lighting kits have been produced for use with the Polar Lights C-57D kits.

In 2012 and 2013, a limited run 1/300 scale (6 inches diameter) C-57D reproduction was offered for sale only through eBay; it was turned on a lathe from a solid piece of billet aluminum stock; it came with no display stand, gangway, conveyor ramps, or central landing pedestal.

== In tribute ==
A fictional spaceship depicted on the planet Miranda in the 2005 Joss Whedon film Serenity carries the ship number "C57D".
