= Button, Button (The Twilight Zone) =

- The Twilight Zone segment
- Scene from "Button, Button"
- Episode no.: Season 1 Episode 20b
- Directed by: Peter Medak
- Written by: Logan Swanson
- Based on: the short story by Richard Matheson
- Original air date: March 7, 1986

Guest appearances
- Basil Hoffman as Steward; Brad Davis as Arthur Lewis; Mare Winningham as Norma Lewis

Episode chronology
← Previous "Profile in Silver"	Next → "Need to Know"

"Button, Button" is the second segment of the 20th episode of the first season of the revival of the television series The Twilight Zone. The segment is based on the 1970 short story of the same name by Richard Matheson; the same short story forms the basis of the 2009 film The Box. It poses the question of whether an ordinary person would be willing to cause a total stranger to die in exchange for $200,000 by simply pushing a button. In a documentary on the making of the movie The Box, Matheson states the inspiration for the story came from his wife, whose college professor had asked a similar question as a way of promoting a class discussion.

Matheson, who was one of the most prolific contributors to the original The Twilight Zone, wrote the teleplay for the segment himself under a pseudonym, making "Button, Button" one of just two segments in the series written by one of the original Twilight Zone writers (the other being "The Elevator").

== Plot ==
Arthur and Norma Lewis live in a low-rent apartment and are descending into abject poverty. One day, a box with a button on top of it is delivered to their apartment. That evening, a man who introduces himself as Mr. Steward visits. He gives Norma the key to the box and explains that if she presses the button, someone she does not know will die, and she will receive $200,000.

Arthur and Norma wonder whether Steward's proposal is genuine, and debate whether to press the button. They open the box and discover it is empty, with no mechanism that the button could activate, so Arthur throws it in the trash. However, after Arthur goes to bed, Norma retrieves the box from the dumpster. The next day, Arthur sees Norma sitting at the kitchen table transfixed by the button. He encourages her to push it just so she can get it off her mind. Finally, she pushes the button.

The next day, Mr. Steward returns to retrieve the box and deliver the $200,000. Steward says that the button will be "reprogrammed" and offered to someone else with the same terms and conditions adding as he focuses on Norma: "I can assure you it will be offered to someone whom you don't know." A horrified, knowing expression crosses Norma's face.

== Short story ==
"Button, Button" was first published in Playboy, June 1970. The story was republished as part of a collection of Matheson's short stories.

In the original short story, the plot is resolved differently. Norma presses the button, and receives the money—after her husband dies in a train incident, where he is pushed onto the tracks. The money is the no-fault insurance settlement, which is $50,000 rather than the $200,000 in the Twilight Zone episode. A despondent Norma asks the stranger why her husband was the one who was killed. The stranger replies, "Do you really think you knew your husband?"

Matheson strongly disapproved of the Twilight Zone version, especially the new ending, and used his pseudonym Logan Swanson for the teleplay.

== Film ==
The Box, a feature film based on this story written and directed by Richard Kelly, starring Cameron Diaz and James Marsden, was released in 2009. Basil Hoffman, the actor who played Steward in the Twilight Zone episode, appears in the film in a different role.

== Radio ==
A radio-play version of the story previously was written by Henry Slesar, who also produced the radio program. As the CBS Radio Mystery Theater 15th episode entitled "The Chinaman Button", it was first broadcast Jan. 20, 1974. It was repeated at least twice on March 15, 1974, and again October 7, 1978.

In this version of the story, a man who is desperate for money is offered the chance to make a fortune. All he has to do is commit an anonymous murder, where he will not even have to see the victim. Actors for this radio play were Mason Adams, Paul Hecht, Evie Juster, Ralph Bell, and Will Hare.

== See also ==
- "The Monkey's Paw"
- Double Indemnity – 1944 American film by Billy Wilder

== Bibliography ==
- Matheson, Richard (2005). Stanley Wiater (ed.). Richard Matheson: Collected Stories, Vol. 3. Gauntlet Press.
