= Basil Hoffman =

American actor (1938–2021)

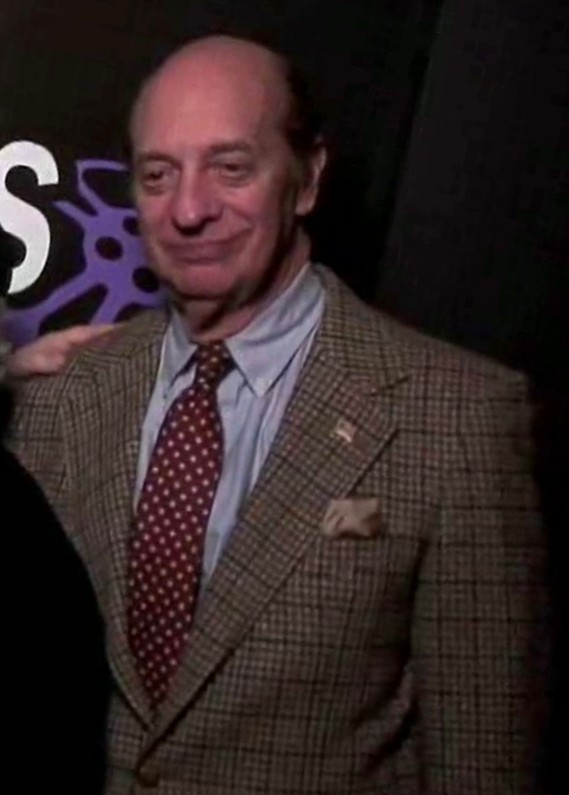
- Hoffman in 2009
- Born: Basil Harry Hoffman; January 18, 1938; Houston, Texas, U.S.
- Died: September 17, 2021 (aged 83)
- Occupation: Actor
- Years active: 1964–2021
- Spouse: Christine Elizabeth Reed (m. 1988; died 2006)

Basil Harry Hoffman (January 18, 1938 – September 17, 2021) was an American actor with a film and television career spanning five decades, mostly in supporting roles. He starred in films with many award-winning directors, including Alan Pakula and Robert Redford. He also authored two books about acting, including Acting and How to Be Good at It.

== Early years ==
Hoffman was born in Houston, Texas in January 1938. He graduated from Tulane University; and he spent two years at the American Academy of Dramatic Arts in New York City.

== Career ==
His thirteen years of work in New York included many plays, some roles in episodic television, a recurring character on One Life to Live on ABC, hundreds of commercials and a film role in Lady Liberty with Sophia Loren, directed by Mario Monicelli.

He made his first trip to Los Angeles in 1974. In that season, he filmed a theatrical feature, At Long Last Love, for Peter Bogdanovich. In the years that followed he appeared in two television movies, television episodes of Kung Fu, The Rockford Files, Sanford and Son (2 roles), Police Woman, Columbo, Kojak, M*A*S*H (2 roles), Barney Miller and several TV commercials. He had recurring roles as the fingerprint technician on Ellery Queen and as Principal Dingleman on Square Pegs. He was also the person who delivered "The Button" in the 1980s revival of The Twilight Zone.

Although most of his work was in film and television, he made a few stage appearances, most notably in Sand Mountain, by Romulus Linney, for which he won a Drama-Logue Award, the first staged reading of Martin E. Brooks’ Joe and Flo at the Actors Studio, and the world premiere of William Blinn's Walking Peoria.

He was best known for his work with distinguished film directors, including Peter Bogdanovich, Mario Monicelli, Richard Benjamin, Carl Reiner (twice), Peter Medak (six times) and Alan J. Pakula (twice); Academy Award winners Joel and Ethan Coen, Paolo Sorrentino, Michel Hazanavicius, Steven Spielberg, Delbert Mann, Blake Edwards, Stanley Donen, Sydney Pollack, Ron Howard and Robert Redford (twice as director); and others. His films include: All the President's Men, Close Encounters of the Third Kind, My Favorite Year, The Electric Horseman, Night Shift, Lucky Lady, Switch, The Milagro Beanfield War, Rio, I Love You, The Pineville Heist, and the Academy Award-winning Best Pictures Ordinary People and The Artist, among many others.

A long-time private acting teacher and coach, he was also a frequent guest lecturer and teacher at prestigious professional and academic institutions, including the American Film Institute, the American Academy of Dramatic Arts, Emerson College, the University of Southern California, Confederation College in Thunder Bay, Ontario, Canada, and the Academie Libanaise des Beaux Arts in Beirut, Lebanon.

In 2008, he returned to Beirut as a U.S. State Department Cultural Envoy to Lebanon to teach acting and directing at the University of Balamand's Academie Libanaise des Beaux Arts, Lebanese University, the University of Notre Dame and St. Joseph University's Institut D'Etude Sceniques Audiovisuelles et Cinematographiques.

Hoffman served as a member of the Board of Directors of Screen Actors Guild and the Fine Arts Advisory Council of Loyola Marymount University. He was an Advisory Director of the American Academy of Dramatic Arts, and a member of both the Academy of Television Arts and Sciences and the Academy of Motion Picture Arts and Sciences.

He was also the author of acting textbooks including, Cold Reading And How to Be Good At It, and Acting and How To Be Good At It.

== Personal life and death ==
Hoffman married Christine Elizabeth Reed in 1988, and they remained wed until her 2006 death. He died on September 17, 2021, at the age of 83.
