= Somewhere in Time (film) =

1980 film by Jeannot Szwarc

- Theatrical film poster
- Directed by: Jeannot Szwarc
- Screenplay by: Richard Matheson
- Based on: Bid Time Return by Richard Matheson
- Produced by: Stephen Deutsch; Ray Stark (uncredited)
- Starring: Christopher Reeve; Jane Seymour; Christopher Plummer; Teresa Wright
- Cinematography: Isidore Mankofsky
- Edited by: Jeff Gourson
- Music by: John Barry
- Production company: Rastar
- Distributed by: Universal Pictures
- Release date: October 3, 1980
- Running time: 103 minutes
- Country: United States
- Language: English
- Budget: $4 million
- Box office: $9.7 million

Somewhere in Time is a 1980 American romantic fantasy drama film from Universal Pictures, directed by Jeannot Szwarc and starring Christopher Reeve, Jane Seymour and Christopher Plummer. It is a film adaptation of the novel Bid Time Return (1975) by Richard Matheson, who also wrote the screenplay.

Reeve plays Richard Collier, a playwright who becomes obsessed with the photograph of a young woman at the Grand Hotel on Mackinac Island, Michigan. Through self-hypnosis, he transports himself back in time to the year 1912 to find love with actress Elise McKenna (Seymour). He comes into conflict with Elise's manager, William Fawcett Robinson (Plummer), who attempts to deter him, fearing that romance would derail her career.

The film is known for its musical score composed by John Barry, featuring pianist Roger Williams. The 18th variation of Sergei Rachmaninoff's Rhapsody on a Theme of Paganini is also used several times.

In 2018, Seymour disclosed that she and Reeve fell in love while working on the film. However, they broke up after Reeve found out his ex-girlfriend was expecting their child. The two remained close friends for the rest of Reeve's life.

Despite an unfavorable critical reception and modest box office receipts in its original release, the movie developed a cult following.

== Plot ==
In 1972, college theater student Richard Collier celebrates the debut of his new play. An elderly woman approaches him, places an ornate gold pocket watch in his hand, and pleads, "Come back to me."

Eight years later, Richard is a successful playwright living in Chicago. While struggling with writer's block after breaking up with his girlfriend, he takes a road trip. Passing the Grand Hotel, he has the impulse to stay there. In the hotel's Hall of History, he becomes enthralled with a vintage photograph of Elise McKenna, an early-20th-century stage actress. Research at the library shows that she is the woman who gave him the pocket watch. Richard visits Laura Roberts, Elise's former housekeeper and companion. She reveals that Elise died the night she gave Richard the watch. Among Elise's personal effects is a book on time travel written by his old college professor, Dr. Gerard Finney, (Note: The professor's last name is likely an homage to Jack Finney, author of the 1970 novel Time and Again, who travels back in time via a nearly identical self-hypnosis method.) and a miniature Grand Hotel music box she commissioned that plays the 18th variation of Rhapsody on a Theme of Paganini by Rachmaninoff, his favorite musical piece.

Having fallen in love with Elise, Richard becomes obsessed with traveling back to 1912 and meeting her. He visits Finney, who believes that he briefly time-traveled through the power of self-suggestion. Richard outfits himself with a vintage suit and 1912 currency. He fills a coin pocket in the suit with pocket change before realizing that modern coinage would break the spell, then empties the pocket. He attempts to will himself to 1912 using tape-recorded suggestions. The attempt fails, but he realizes he will succeed after finding a 1912 hotel register containing his signature.

He makes another attempt, hiding the tape recorder after realizing it was a reminder of the present. When he awakens in 1912, he finds Elise walking by the lake. Upon meeting him, she asks, "Is it you?” Her manager, William Fawcett Robinson, intervenes and sends Richard away. Although Elise is initially uninterested, Richard pursues her until she agrees to accompany him on a stroll the following afternoon. He asks what Elise meant by "Is it you?" Elise reveals that Robinson had predicted that she would meet a man who will change her life and that she should be afraid. On a rowboat, Richard hums Rachmaninoff's Rhapsody, which intrigues Elise as she had never heard it before, its premiere still decades later. Richard shows her the pocket watch she will give him in 60 years.

Richard attends Elise's play, where she recites an impromptu romantic monologue while making eye contact with him. In the interval, Elise poses for a photograph and, once more, makes eye contact with Richard, breaking into a radiant smile. This is the photograph Richard saw hanging at the hotel. During the play, Richard receives a message from Robinson requesting an urgent meeting. Robinson wants him to leave Elise so she can fulfill his prediction of stardom on the stage. When Richard declares his intention to stand by Elise for the rest of her life, Robinson has him beaten and bound inside the stables. Robinson tells Elise that Richard has left. Richard wakes the next morning and frees himself. The acting company has left for Denver, but Elise has stayed behind to find him. They go to her room, express their love, and have sex. Elise checks the time of day on his pocket watch. They agree to marry, and Elise promises to buy Richard a new suit, as his was fashionable before 1900. Emptying pockets, Richard discovers he had missed a penny with a 1979 mint date. This modern item breaks the hypnotic suggestion, pulling Richard into the present.

He awakens in 1980, physically weakened by the time travel. His attempts to return to 1912 are unsuccessful. He despondently wanders the hotel grounds and finally stops eating. The hotel manager finds him catatonic in his hotel room, but he dies before he can be taken to a hospital. Richard is reunited with Elise in the afterlife.

== Cast ==
- Christopher Reeve as Richard Collier
- Jane Seymour as Elise McKenna
  - Susan French as Older Elise
- Christopher Plummer as William Fawcett Robinson
- Teresa Wright as Laura Roberts
- Bill Erwin as Arthur Biehl
  - Sean Hayden as 5-year-old Arthur in 1912
- George Voskovec as Dr. Gerard Finney
- John Alvin as Arthur's father
- Eddra Gale as Genevieve
- Tim Kazurinsky as a photographer in 1912
- William H. Macy as a critic in the 1972 scene (before Elise hands the watch to Richard)
- Don Franklin as tourist in Hall of History #2

Richard Matheson, who wrote the original novel and screenplay, appears in a cameo role as a 1912 hotel guest. He is astonished by Richard's having cut himself shaving with a straight razor. Richard Matheson's daughter, Ali, is credited as a student in 1980.

George Wendt is credited as a student in the same scene, but his role was cut as the scene was changed to in medias res.

== Reception ==
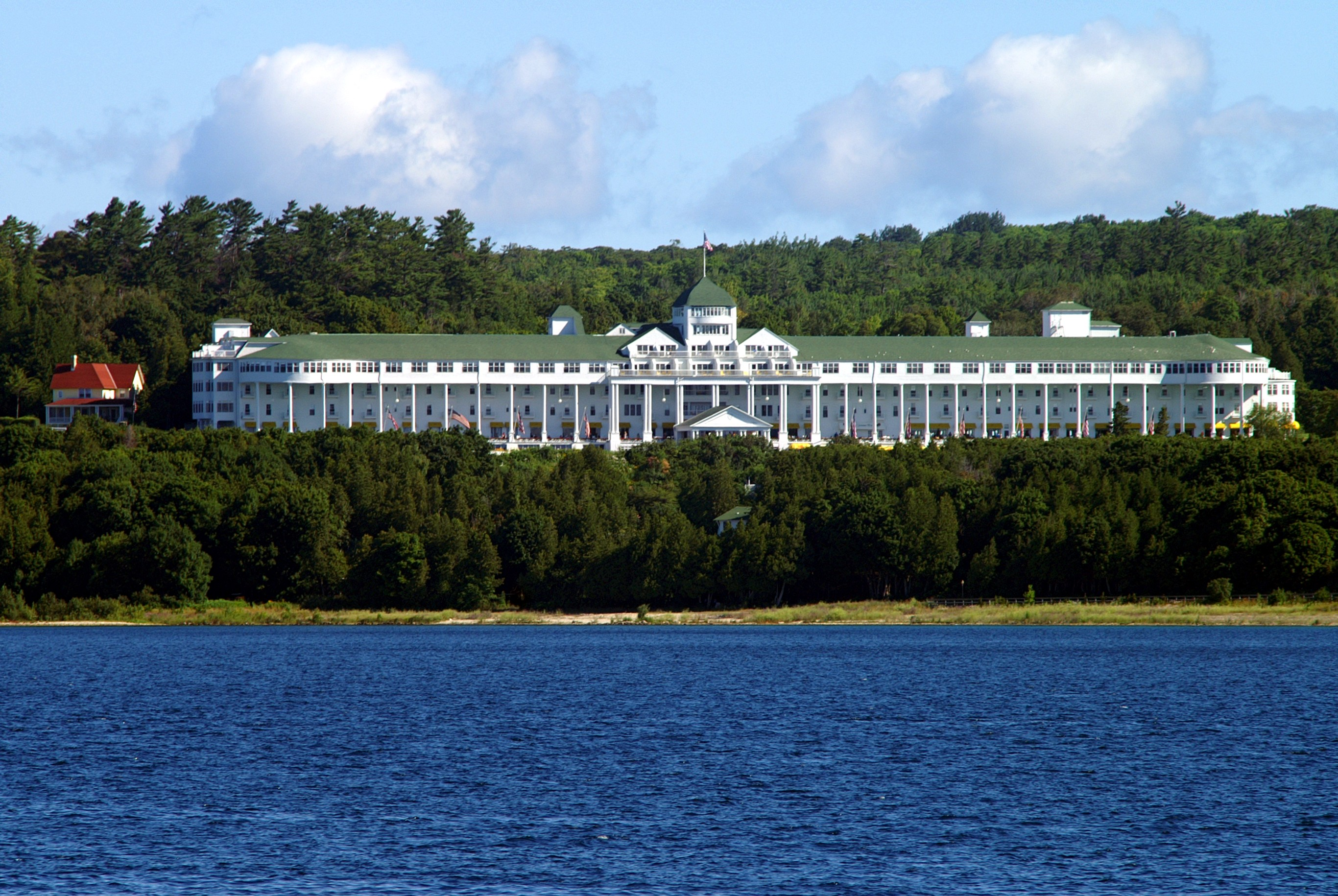
The Grand Hotel, where the film was shot

Although the film was well received during its previews, it was derided by critics upon release and underperformed at the box office.

In a TCM interview, Jane Seymour stated:

Well, what happened is we finished the movie and we weren't allowed to publicize it. The Screen Actors Guild had a strike, and Chris and I were not allowed to tell anyone about the movie and its time to come out. Plus, Universal spent ... something very minimal on this movie. And they had a thing called The Blues Brothers, they were very worried about getting their investment back on, so they ignored us completely. So literally they hid this movie ... and I remember we got the worst reviews ever.

NEA syndicated columnist Dick Kleiner attended Universal's press party at the Grand Hotel:

But along came the actors' strike, and the actors' unions forbade its members from promoting any film for the duration. Universal bravely went ahead with the trip [to Mackinac Island] anyhow, but substituted creative personnel for the stars. It was as refreshing as the porch and the air. There was the producer, Stephen Deutsch, and the writer, Richard Matheson, and the director, Jeannot Szwarc, and Universal's executive in charge, Verna Fields. They were considerably more stimulating than actors usually are....Talking with the creators, as I did over a four-day weekend on this extraordinarily lovely island, was educational, informative and illuminating....With the stars you talk about things like marriage and kids and how they want to become producers when they grow up."

=== Box office ===
Domestically, the film had gross receipts of $9.7 million on a $4 million budget.

The film was well received in the then British Hong Kong. It was screened exclusively at the Palace Theatre Cinema in Causeway Bay, the most luxurious cinema in Hong Kong at that time, starting from September 12, 1981. Due to its excellent reputation and box office, it continued to be screened at the Palace Theatre until April 22, 1982, for a total of 223 days. This set the record for the longest continuous screening of a film in Hong Kong at that time, and it also kept the theatre itself full for three consecutive months. In the end, the film earned HKD 9.38 million at the box office, making it the highest-grossing international film of the year 1982 in Hong Kong.

=== Critical response ===
On the review aggregator website Rotten Tomatoes, 54% of 24 critics' reviews are positive, with an average rating of 6.1/10. Metacritic, which uses a weighted average, assigned the film a score of 29 out of 100, based on 7 critics, indicating "generally unfavorable" reviews.

== Accolades ==
Somewhere in Time received several awards, including Saturn Awards for Best Costume, Best Music, and Best Fantasy Film. The film was also nominated for the Academy Award for Best Costume Design (Jean-Pierre Dorleac).

The film is recognized by the American Film Institute in these lists:

- 2002: AFI's 100 Years...100 Passions – Nominated
- 2005: AFI's 100 Years of Film Scores – Nominated

== Soundtrack ==
The film's original musical score was composed and conducted by John Barry, who was suggested by Jane Seymour, a personal friend. The producers had been considering a score based on the 18th variation of Sergei Rachmaninoff's Rhapsody on a Theme of Paganini, which is used in the film several times.

Barry wrote the score at a prolific time in his career, scoring the music for films such as Raise the Titanic, High Road to China, and Body Heat, all within an 18-month period.

The music has been released on two albums, neither of which are from the original sessions from the film itself. The album was a series of re-recordings with highlights of the score recorded to fit onto two sides of an LP. The original release from MCA Records has nine tracks.

1. Somewhere in Time (2:58)
2. The Old Woman (2:49)
3. The Journey Back in Time (4:22)
4. A Day Together (6:02)
5. Rhapsody on a Theme of Paganini (composed by Rachmaninov) (2:57)
6. Is He the One? (3:10)
7. The Man of My Dreams (1:35)
8. Return to the Present (4:04)
9. Theme from "Somewhere in Time" (3:20)

Very few copies of the album were pressed, with limited circulation. Following cable television airings the following spring, Universal pressed 500,000 more copies.

A second album of the score was released on the Varèse Sarabande label. It was recorded in 1998 by the Royal Scottish Orchestra, conducted by John Debney:

1. Somewhere in Time (3:37)
2. Old Woman (1:00)
3. Grand Hotel (1:22)
4. 1912 (1:42)
5. Thanks (1:20)
6. June 27 (1:32)
7. Room 417 (1:04)
8. The Attic (4:07)
9. Near the Lake (2:14)
10. Rhapsody on a Theme of Paganini (composed by Rachmaninov) (3:06)
11. Is He the One? (0:56)
12. A Day Together (2:31)
13. Rowing (1:29)
14. The Man of My Dreams (1:22)
15. Razor (1:12)
16. Total Dismay (4:07)
17. Coin (0:28)
18. Whimper (3:20)
19. Somewhere in Time (end credits) (4:55)

On July 13, 2021, a limited edition album was released by La-La Land Records with an expanded presentation of Barry's music. Tracks 1–17 are presentation of the score, followed by source music and alternates.

1. Theme from Somewhere in Time - Performed by Roger Williams (pianist); Produced by Michael Lloyd 3:26
2. **The Grand Hotel 2:04**
3. Rhapsody on a Theme of Paganini (Piano Solo by Chet Swiatkowski) 2:54
4. The Old Woman (Film Version) 2:49
5. **June 27 2:03**
6. **Room 417 1:11**
7. The Journey Back in Time 4:29
8. Is He the One? (Film Version) 3:13
9. A Day Together (Film Version) 2:31
10. **Rowing 1:15**
11. The Man of My Dreams 1:42
12. **That's It :40**
13. **Razor 1:05**
14. Total Dismay 3:21
15. **Coin :37**
16. **Return to the Present 4:10**
17. A Day Together (End Credits) 6:08
18. **After Party 2:03**
19. **Car Jazz 2:00**
20. Rhapsody on a Theme of Paganini (Alternate) - Piano Solo by Chet Swiatkowski 3:03
21. Rhapsody on a Theme of Paganini (Music Box) 2:11
22. **Is He the One? (Alternate Excerpt) 2:21**
23. **My Melancholy Baby 2:02**
24. **Oh, You Beautiful Doll 3:30**
25. **In the Good Old Summer Time :37**
26. **I Want a Girl (Just Like the Girl That Married Dear Old Dad) 1:53**
27. **Wisdom of the Heart 1:09**
28. **Somewhere in Time (Piano Theme) 1:59**
29. **Rowing (Alternate) 1:18**
30. **Razor (Alternate) :51**
31. **Coin (Alternate) :32**
32. **Somewhere in Time (Theme Variation) 1:46**
33. **Finale and End Credits (From the Motion Picture Somewhere in Time) 4:57**

Tracks in bold are previously unreleased. Tracks in italics contain previously unreleased material.

=== Certifications ===
Region	Certification	Certified units/sales
Brazil (Pro-Música Brasil)	Gold	100,000^{*}
United States (RIAA)	Platinum	1,000,000^{^}
^{*} Sales figures based on certification alone.^{^} Shipments figures based on certification alone.

== Legacy ==
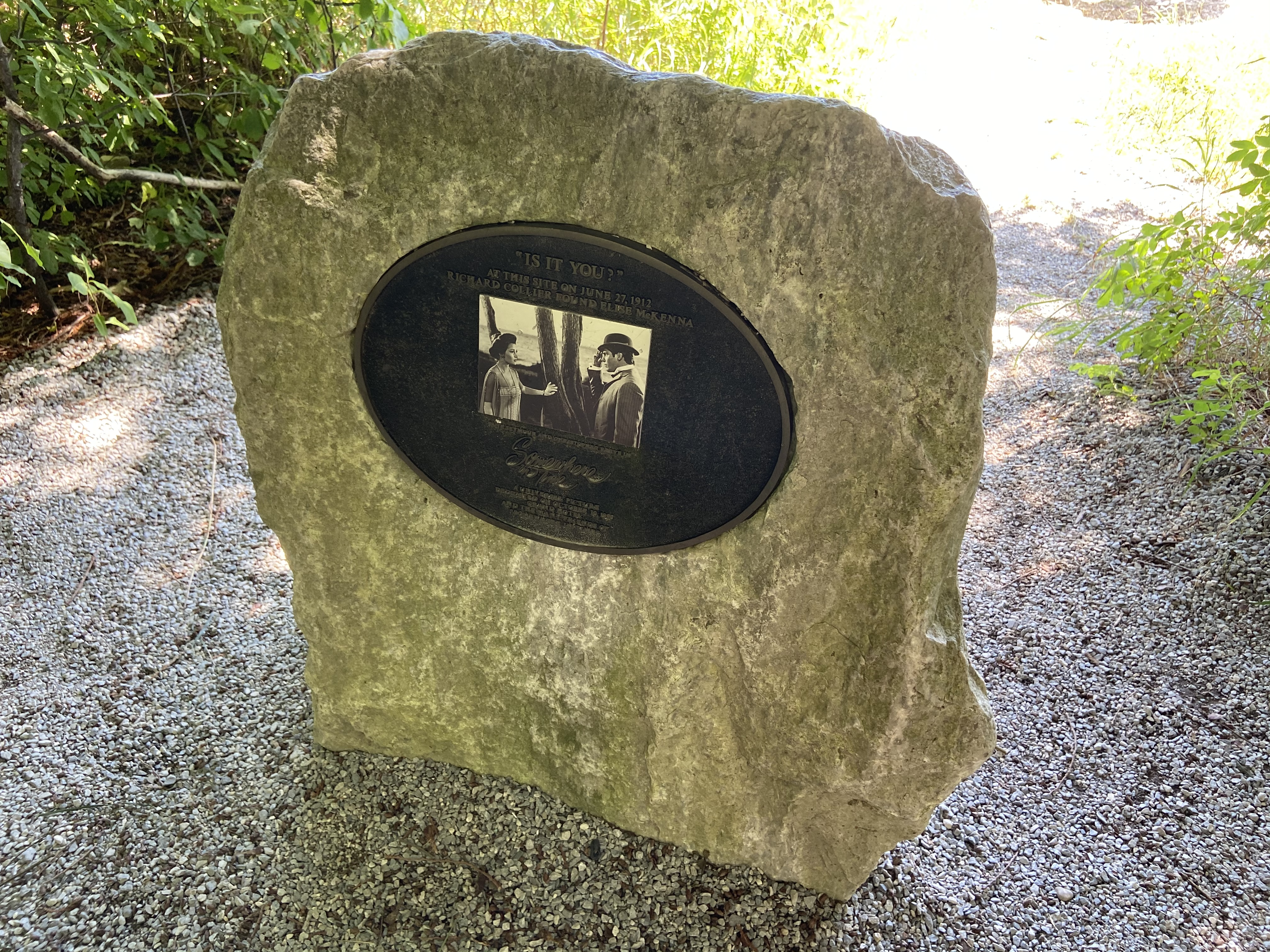
A stone monument located at one of the filming locations

Despite reviews calling the film "horrible" and a "superficial tear jerker", the International Network of Somewhere In Time Enthusiasts (I.N.S.I.T.E.), an official fan club, was formed in 1990 and continues to meet regularly. During the month of October, the Grand Hotel hosts a Somewhere in Time Weekend, with events such as a large-screen viewing of the film, panel discussions with some of the film's principals and crew, and a costume ball of members dressed in Edwardian attire.

The film was mentioned by characters as an example of popular culture time travel in the film Avengers: Endgame (2019).

Ken Davenport produced a theatrical adaptation of the story with assistance from Matheson on the story book. The adaptation received New York workshops and a full production at Portland Center Stage.

Due to the popularity of the film in Hong Kong, singer Adam Cheng recorded a Cantopop cover version (如在夢中; lit. "Like in a Dream") that was adapted from the theme music of the film in 1982, and the song was included in Cheng's album "Brothers Four".

== See also ==
- The Two Worlds of Jennie Logan
- List of films featuring time loops
