= The Pineville Heist =

- Directed by: Lee Chambers
- Written by: Todd Gordon; Lee Chambers
- Based on: The Pineville Heist by Todd Gordon & Lee Chambers
- Starring: Basil Hoffman; Presley Massara; Carl Bailey
- Cinematography: David Le May
- Edited by: Regg Skwarko
- Music by: Fabio Acri
- Distributed by: Jetlag Pictures
- Release date: April 6, 2016 (Canada)
- Running time: 80 minutes
- Country: Canada
- Language: English

The Pineville Heist is a 2016 Canadian action film, directed by Lee Chambers and cowritten by Chambers and Todd Gordon. The film is based on the 2011 screenplay by Chambers and Gordon.

== Plot ==
A teenager witnesses the aftermath of a bank heist when he witnesses the murder of one of the robbers. In the chaos, he gets away with their loot and hides with his drama teacher in the high school as one of the robbers tracks him.

== Cast ==
- Basil Hoffman – Principal Parker
- Presley Massara – Aaron Stevens
- Carl Bailey – Sheriff Tremblay
- Jacob Brown – Mike
- Wayne V. Johnson – Derek Stevens
- Darryl Dougherty – Officer Carl Smith
- Vince Groulx – Chuck
- Priscilla-Anne Jacob – Amanda Becker

== Awards ==
Award	Category	Recipient	Result	Ref.
Chandler International Film Festival	Best Picture	Lee Chambers	Won	
Chandler International Film Festival	Best Actor	Carl Bailey	Won	
Melbourne Indie Film Festival	Best Editing	Regg Swarko	Won	
Melbourne Indie Film Festival	Best Film	Lee Chambers	Nominated	
Melbourne Indie Film Festival	Best Director	Lee Chambers	Nominated	
Melbourne Indie Film Festival	Best Cinematography	David Le May	Nominated	
Melbourne Indie Film Festival	Best Score	Fabio Acri	Nominated	
Melbourne Indie Film Festival	Best Special Effects	George Renner	Nominated	
US Hollywood International Film Festival	Best Actress	Priscilla-Anne Jacob	Nominated	
Actors Awards, Los Angeles	Best Actress	Priscilla-Anne Jacob	Won	
