= Bid Time Return =

1975 science fiction novel by Richard Matheson

- First edition cover
- Author: Richard Matheson
- Language: English
- Genre: Science fiction
- Publisher: Viking Press
- Publication date: February 24, 1975
- Publication place: United States
- Media type: Print (Hardback)
- Pages: 278 pp
- ISBN: 0-89966-514-4
- OCLC: 33446645

Bid Time Return is a 1975 science fiction novel by American author Richard Matheson. It concerns a man from the 1970s who travels back in time to court a 19th-century stage actress whose photograph has captivated him. In 1980, it was made into the film Somewhere in Time, the title of which was used for subsequent editions of the book.

Matheson has stated, "Somewhere in Time is the story of a love which transcends time, What Dreams May Come is the story of a love which transcends death.... I feel that they represent the best writing I have done in the novel form."

== Background ==
While traveling with his family, Matheson was entranced by the portrait of American actress Maude Adams in Piper's Opera House in Nevada. "It was such a great photograph," Matheson reports, "that creatively I fell in love with her. What if some guy did the same thing and could go back in time?" Then Matheson researched her life and was struck by her reclusiveness. To create the novel, he resided for many weeks at the Hotel del Coronado (where the novel takes place) and dictated his impressions into a tape recorder while experiencing himself in the role of Richard Collier. Matheson based much of the biographical information about the character of Elise McKenna directly on Adams. The book's original title comes from a line in William Shakespeare's Richard II (Act III, Scene 2): "O call back yesterday, bid time return."

== Main characters ==
- Richard Collier — protagonist and main narrator, a 36-year-old man from the 1970s who travels back in time to meet the woman of his dreams
- Elise McKenna — a 19th-century stage actress with whom Richard falls in love after seeing her photo in a hotel gallery
- William Fawcett Robinson — Elise's overbearing manager, who distrusts Richard
- Robert Collier — Richard's brother, who decides to publish Richard's manuscripts

== Plot ==
Richard Collier is a 36-year-old screenwriter who has been diagnosed with an inoperable brain tumor and has decided, after a coin flip, to spend his last days hanging around Hotel del Coronado. Most of the novel represents a private journal he is continually updating throughout the story.

He becomes obsessed with the photograph of a famous stage actress, Elise McKenna, who performed at the hotel in the 1890s. Through research, he learns that she had an overprotective manager named William Fawcett Robinson, that she never married and that she seemed to have had a brief affair with a mysterious man while staying at this hotel in 1896. The more Richard learns, the more he becomes convinced that it is his destiny to travel back in time and become that mysterious man.

Collier researches ideas of time and comes to believe that he can hypnotize himself out of his present moment and into 1896. After much struggle, he succeeds. At first, he experiences feelings of disorientation and constantly worries that he will be drawn back into the present, but soon these feelings dissipate.

He is unsure what to say to Elise when he finally does meet her, but to his surprise she immediately asks, "Is it you?" (She later explains that two psychics told her she would meet a mysterious man at that exact time and place.) Without telling her where (or, rather, when) he comes from, he pursues a relationship with her, while struggling to adapt himself to the conventions of the time. Inexplicably, his daily headaches are gone, and he believes that his memory of having come from the future will ultimately disappear.

But Robinson, who assumes that Richard is simply after Elise's wealth, hires two men to abduct Richard and leave him in a shed while Elise departs on a train. Richard manages to escape and make his way back to the hotel, where he finds that Elise never left. They go to a hotel room and passionately have sex.

In the middle of the night, Richard leaves the room and bumps into Robinson. After a brief physical struggle, Richard quickly runs back into the room. He casually picks a coin out of his pocket, not realizing until too late that it is a 1971 coin. The sight of it pushes him back into the present.

At the end of the book, we find out that Richard died soon after. A doctor claims that the time-traveling experience occurred only in Richard's mind, the desperate fantasy of a dying man, but Richard's brother, who has chosen to publish the journal, is not completely convinced.

== Awards ==
The novel won the 1976 World Fantasy Award for Best Novel.

== See also ==
- Jack Finney's 1970 illustrated novel Time and Again has a similar theme and method of time travel.
