= Abu and the 7 Marvels =

2002 novel by Richard Matheson

Abu and the Seven Marvels
- First edition
- Author: Richard Matheson
- Illustrator: William Stout
- Language: English
- Genre: Fairy tale fiction
- Published: 2002
- Publisher: Gauntlet
- Publication place: US
- Pages: 135
- ISBN: 978-1-887368-49-0

Abu and the Seven Marvels is a 2002 illustrated fairy tale novel by Richard Matheson, and illustrated by William Stout. Abu is a Persian varlet who seeks the hand of Princess Alicia, in a love triangle with the scheming Grand Vizier Zardak. Inspired heavily by Arabian Nights, Abu must seek tokens from each of the seven marvels of the world in order to win Alicia's hand. He is accompanied by a washed-up genie and his little brother Mut.

== Reception ==
Publishers Weekly stated that it was "(w)himsical and diabolically clever" and "a gem", while The Guardian called it "charming".

== Art ==
William Stout described his participation in the project as "a labor of love", and noted that his original artwork — "several elaborate and well-researched full color illustrations" — was rejected by Matheson as too "serious".
