= The Legend of Hell House =

1973 film directed by John Hough

- Theatrical release poster
- Directed by: John Hough
- Screenplay by: Richard Matheson
- Based on: Hell House by Richard Matheson
- Produced by: Albert Fennell; Norman T. Herman
- Starring: Pamela Franklin; Roddy McDowall; Clive Revill; Gayle Hunnicutt
- Cinematography: Alan Hume
- Edited by: Geoffrey Foot
- Music by: Delia Derbyshire; Brian Hodgson
- Production company: Academy Pictures Corporation
- Distributed by: Fox-Rank Distributors (United Kingdom); 20th Century Fox (United States)
- Release dates: 30 May 1973 (Dallas); 18 November 1973 (United Kingdom)
- Running time: 95 minutes
- Countries: United Kingdom; United States
- Language: English
- Box office: $2.5 million

The Legend of Hell House is a 1973 gothic supernatural horror film directed by John Hough and starring Pamela Franklin, Roddy McDowall, Clive Revill, and Gayle Hunnicutt. Adapted by Richard Matheson from his 1971 novel Hell House, the film follows a group of researchers who spend a week in the former home of a sadist and murderer, where previous paranormal investigators were inexplicably killed.

A co-production between the United Kingdom and United States, The Legend of Hell House marked the first feature film venture for American producer James H. Nicholson's Academy Pictures Corporation. Principal photography took place at Wykehurst Park and Blenheim Palace in England, with interiors completed at EMI-Elstree Studios.

The film was released in the United States on 15 June 1973 by 20th Century Fox, followed by a British release on 18 November 1973. It received mixed reviews from critics. It was nominated for Best Horror Film at the 2nd Saturn Awards.

== Plot ==
Ailing millionaire publisher Rudolph Deutsch enlists physicist Lionel Barrett to investigate the afterlife at the Belasco House, which is believed to be haunted by the victims of "Roaring Giant" Emeric Belasco, a sadistic millionaire who revelled in acts of violence and debauchery. Barrett is accompanied by his wife, Ann; mental medium and spiritualist minister Florence Tanner; and physical medium Benjamin Fischer, the sole survivor of an investigation conducted 20 years earlier. The group convene at the Belasco House in the week before Christmas.

During the group's first night at the house, Barrett disagrees with Tanner's assertion that the house is haunted, and Fischer describes some of the house's depraved history, including a 1929 search in which 27 people were found dead, though Belasco was not among them. The group hold a séance, during which objects clatter and fall and Tanner seems to channel a spirit who threatens the group. Tanner believes that the spirit is Emeric's son, Daniel.

During another séance on the following night, Tanner manifests ectoplasm and afterwards confronts Barrett about his scepticism. After objects in the room seem to target Barrett, he accuses Tanner of harnessing the house's energy to attack him, but she insists Daniel is responsible. That night, the sexually frustrated Ann has a brief vision of an erotic statuette becoming sentient. She then drinks and reads from a book about "autoerotic phenomena". In an apparent trance, she tries to seduce Fischer and describes her vision of a drunken orgy among the three investigators and herself. Fischer breaks her trance, and she runs back to her bedroom, aghast. Tanner discovers a corpse in the cellar that she believes was Daniel. She and Fischer perform funerary rites, but her sleep is disturbed by the spirit's cries for help, and she is mauled by a black cat.

Tanner tells Fischer that she believes Emeric Belasco is orchestrating the paranormal attacks and imprisoning Daniel's soul. Barrett later witnesses Ann making further sexual advances towards Fischer. Horrified and confused by her own behavior, Ann apologizes to Barrett, and the couple affirm their mutual love. The next day, Fischer expresses doubt about Tanner's theory and suggests that she guard her mind and wait to collect payment from Deutsch, as he intends to do. Barrett tells Ann that he plans to use a machine to de-energize the house, though Fischer warns him that the house will retaliate. Tanner yields to the spirit's sexual entreaties, believing that her love will allow Daniel to cross over to the afterlife, but she screams upon seeing the spirit. Fischer watches over her as she sleeps to ensure her safety.

The next morning, Tanner is uncharacteristically flirtatious and insolent towards Fischer, but then expresses fear that Daniel is possessing her body. Fischer tells Ann and Barrett that he plans to leave the house with Tanner. Barrett says that the house is not haunted but has accumulated immense residual electromagnetic radiation from its depraved former occupants, which he intends to neutralize. On Christmas Eve, Tanner is possessed by the spirit and tries to destroy the machine, but Barrett knocks her unconscious. As Barrett prepares the machine, Tanner regains consciousness and enters the house's chapel to warn Daniel to leave before the machine dislocates him. She is crushed by a falling crucifix, realizes that the spirit tricked her into believing it was Daniel, and draws a circled B with her blood before dying. Barrett's machine initially seems to clear the house's energy, but he is killed when the spirit causes machinery to explode in his face and drops a chandelier on him.

Convinced that Belasco is the sole entity haunting the house, Fischer confronts him in the chapel alongside Ann. Belasco tries to incapacitate Fischer, but Fischer subdues him with taunts about his illegitimate birth, deviancy, and fraudulent stature, the last of which Fischer deduced from Belasco's history of attacking bodily extremities. A stained-glass partition shatters, revealing a hidden door. Fischer and Ann enter to find Belasco's preserved body in a chair. Fischer discovers that Belasco used prosthetic legs to make himself taller and that he had the hidden room lined with lead to prevent future electromagnetic damage to his spirit. With the room now open, Fischer reactivates Barrett's machine and leaves the house with Ann.

== Cast ==
- Pamela Franklin as Florence Tanner
- Roddy McDowall as Benjamin Franklin Fischer
- Clive Revill as Lionel Barrett
- Gayle Hunnicutt as Ann Barrett
- Roland Culver as Rudolph Deutsch
- Peter Bowles as Hanley
- Michael Gough as Emeric Belasco (uncredited)

== Production ==
=== Development ===
The Legend of Hell House is the first of two productions of James H. Nicholson's Academy Pictures Corporation after his departure from American International Pictures—a company he had run with Samuel Z. Arkoff since 1954. Nicholson died of brain cancer on 10 December 1972, before the film's release. Academy Pictures Corporation also released Dirty Mary, Crazy Larry through 20th Century Fox the following year.

The film and its source novel, both written by Richard Matheson, have several details in common with Shirley Jackson's 1959 novel The Haunting of Hill House and subsequent 1963 movie adaptation The Haunting, in which a party of four (some psychic, some sceptical, some British, some American) stay in a haunted Gothic mansion with a terrible history as part of a scientific study and are plagued by unseen terrors.

Matheson's screenplay drastically reduced some extreme elements of the novel, particularly its graphic sexuality and BDSM. The film is set in England, whereas the Belasco house of the novel is in rural Maine, United States. The film is otherwise fairly faithful to the novel, from which it also derives large sections of dialogue.

=== Casting ===
Belasco was played by an uncredited Michael Gough, who recorded a couple of lines and appears onscreen as an embalmed corpse seated in a chair.

Barbara Parkins was originally cast as Ann Barrett, but was replaced by Gayle Hunnicutt before filming began. Roddy McDowall's casting was announced in early September 1972, followed by Pamela Franklin as the lead of Florence Tanner.

=== Filming ===
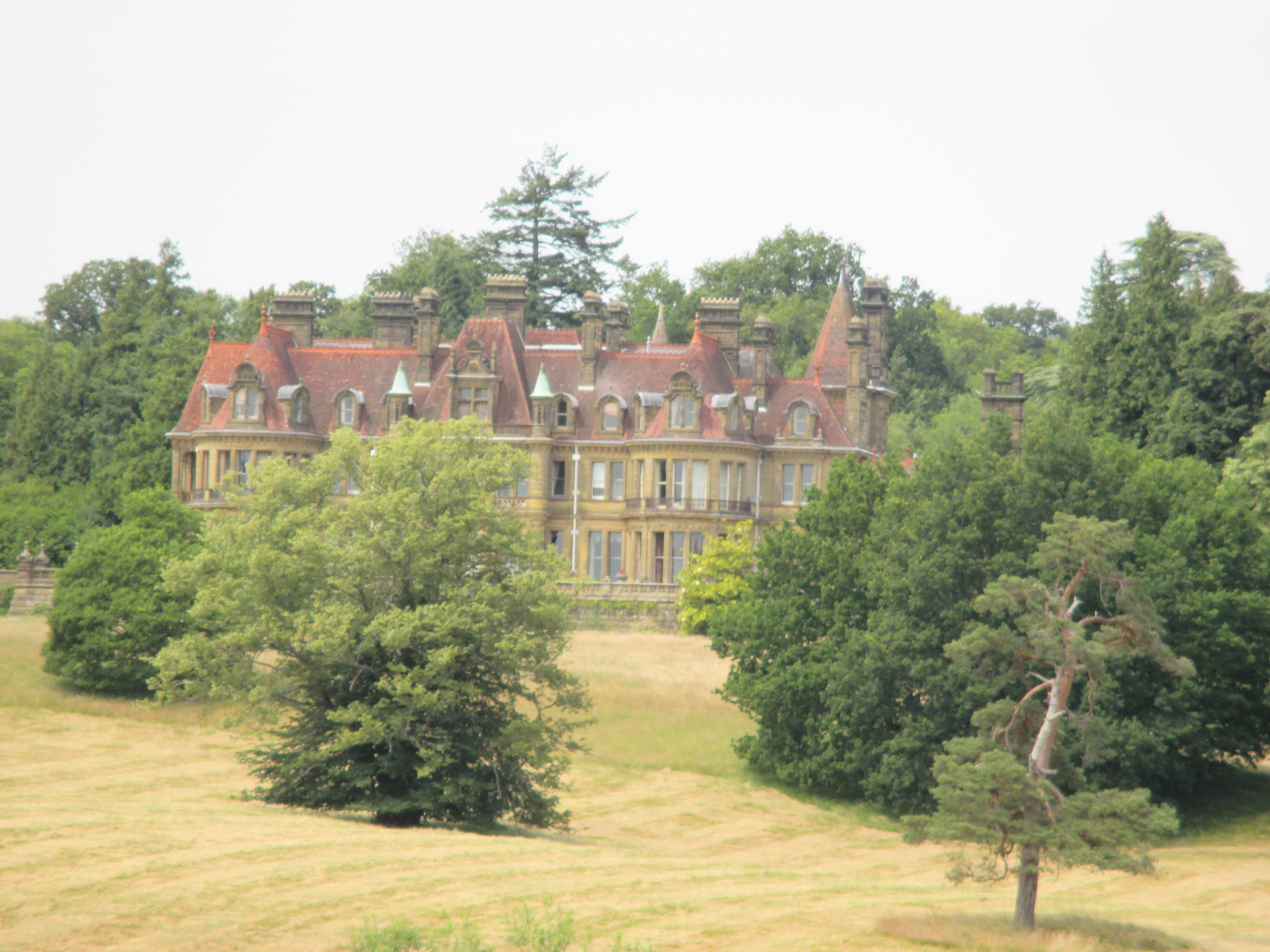
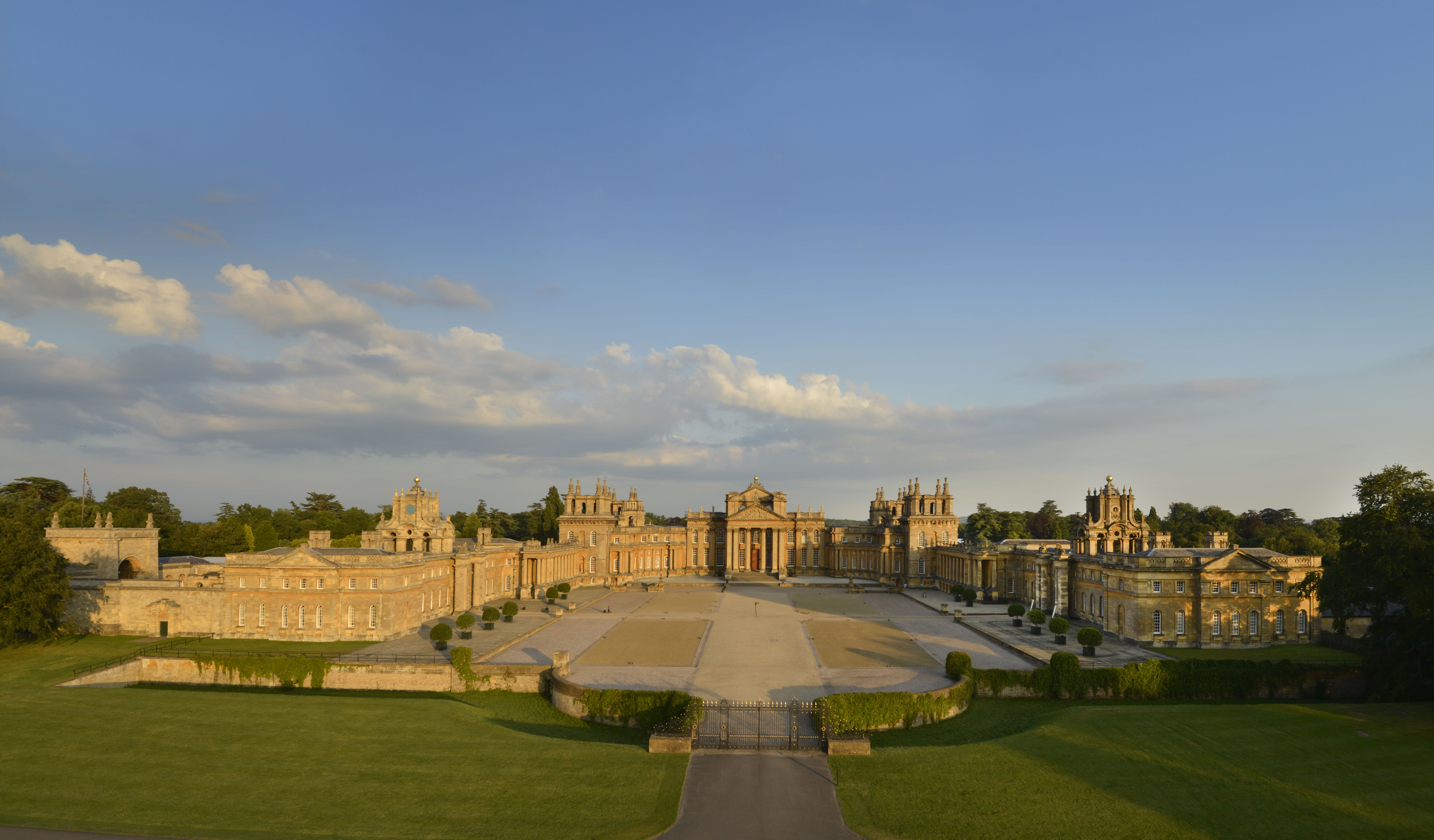
Exterior filming occurred at Wykehurst Park and Blenheim Palace

Principal photography of The Legend of Hell House began in the fall of 1972 in England. Executive producer Nicholson and his crew spent ten days scouting locations in and around London in August of that year. The exterior shots of the house were filmed at Wykehurst Park in Bolney, West Sussex. Mr. Deutsch's mansion in the opening sequence is Blenheim Palace in Woodstock, Oxfordshire. The interior shot of the long room is the palace's library. Studio interiors were shot at EMI-Elstree Studios in Borehamwood.

Thomas Corbett, a clairvoyant and psychic consultant to European royalty, assisted on the film as a technical advisor.

The novel features a scene in which Lionel Barrett is attacked by a rotting apparition in a steam room, which was filmed but later cut. Principal photography was completed by December 1972.

=== Soundtrack ===
The film features a score with an electronic bassline and occasional woodwind and brass stabs. The score and electronic sound effects were created by Delia Derbyshire and Brian Hodgson, recorded at Hodgson's Electrophon studio in London. The soundtrack has not had an official commercial release.

== Release ==
Distributed by 20th Century Fox, The Legend of Hell House opened in the Dallas-Fort Worth region of Texas on 30 May 1973. Its release expanded throughout the United States on 15 June 1973. The film was released by Fox-Rank Distributors in the United Kingdom on 18 November 1973.

=== Box office ===
The Legend of Hell House earned approximately $2.5 million in theatrical rentals in the United States and Canada.

=== Home media ===
The Legend of Hell House was released on VHS cassette by CBS/Fox Video in 1985, on DVD by 20th Century Fox Home Entertainment on 4 September 2001. The DVD includes the theatrical trailer as a special feature.

On 26 August 2014, the Shout! Factory label Scream Factory released the film on Blu-ray. The release includes a 30-minute interview with director John Hough, a commentary track by actress Pamela Franklin, a stills gallery, the original theatrical trailer, radio ads, and reversible cover art featuring the theatrical artwork and customized artwork for the Blu-ray release.

== Reception ==
=== Critical response ===
On the review aggregator website Rotten Tomatoes, 79% of 24 critics' reviews are positive, with an average rating of 6.9/10. The website's consensus reads: "The Legend of Hell House makes up for its disappointing lack of outright scares with a top notch cast and a suitably macabre atmosphere."

Kevin Thomas of the Los Angeles Times praised the film as "darkly elegant" and "excellent in every aspect", as well as characterizeing Hough's direction as "stylish and masterful." Perry Stewart of the Fort Worth Star-Telegram praised the film's performances, "well-paced direction", and musical score, as well as noting it as faithful to the source novel. Joe Baltake of the Philadelphia Daily News also gave the film a favorable review, describing it as "brooding, well-paced, and highly literate and subtle in its approach," adding that Matheson's screenplay is "believable throughout."

Judy Rousuck of the Cleveland Press was alternately unimpressed by the film, characterizing it as plodding and describing it as "the least spine-tingling thriller imaginable."

In 1976, Roger Ebert wrote in his review of Burnt Offerings, another movie about a haunted house, that "The Legend of Hell House brought out the fun in this sort of material very well." In his 2002 Movie & Video Guide, Leonard Maltin gave the film three of four stars and called it "Not the usual ghost story, and certain to curl a few hairs." Time Out called the film disappointing but approved of Pamela Franklin's performance. TV Guide stated, "While director John Hough does a fine job with the things-that-go-bump-in-the-night aspects of the material, he fails to breathe any life into Richard Matheson's woefully underdeveloped screenplay."

== Awards and nominations ==
Institution	Year	Category	Nominee	Result	Ref.
Avoriaz International Fantastic Film Festival	1974	Grand Prize	John Hough	Nominated	
Saturn Awards	1975	Golden Scroll – Best Horror Film	The Legend of Hell House	Nominated	

== Legacy ==
Filmmakers Martin Scorsese and Edgar Wright have expressed admiration for the film. Scorsese said in an October 2024 issue of Sight and Sound:

"It's a serious horror film. It really is. It didn't evade the issue by shocking cuts and what they call now jump scares. It really placed you in that house and it had a creepy feel to it, especially the ghost who takes down the covers of the bed, and then she gets in the bed and then they find her in the morning and she's got scratches on her. It had a sense of a deeper element of evil. The sense of evil in that house – it's titillating in terms of the eroticism of the picture, and what do you do with those wide angle lenses as you say. It certainly was a companion piece for me for The Haunting."

=== Potential remakes ===
In 2002, a remake of the film written by Guillermo del Toro and produced by Don Murphy was being developed, but the project did not reach fruition.

Filmmaker Mike Flanagan said in November 2023 that had a third installment of his anthology series The Haunting been commissioned, the season would have adapted Hell House, but the rights were not available.

=== In popular culture ===
- Dialogue from the film was sampled in Leæther Strip's song "Rotation (Axis Off)", and throughout Skinny Puppy's Remission (1984) and Bites (1985), as well as their song "Church". It has also been sampled by Anaal Nathrakh and in Orbital's "I Don't Know You People" from their 1999 album The Middle of Nowhere.
- It inspired Martin Kunert and Eric Manes to create Fear for MTV Networks.
- Marvel Comics adapted the story into its Werewolf by Night comic book series in issues Nos. 34–37.
- Director Edgar Wright used the film as inspiration for his faux trailer Don't, featured in the 2007 movie Grindhouse.
- Part of the opening sequence, featuring a black cat settling on the wall next to a gatepost, was used by Granada in the ident for its Night Time service.

== Related works ==
Matheson's screenplay was published in the 1997 collection Screamplays and again in 2000 as a stand-alone text.

== See also ==
- The Haunting (1963), an earlier film with a similar premise, based on the 1959 novel The Haunting of Hill House.
- List of ghost films
