= Richard Matheson =

American author and screenwriter (1926–2013)

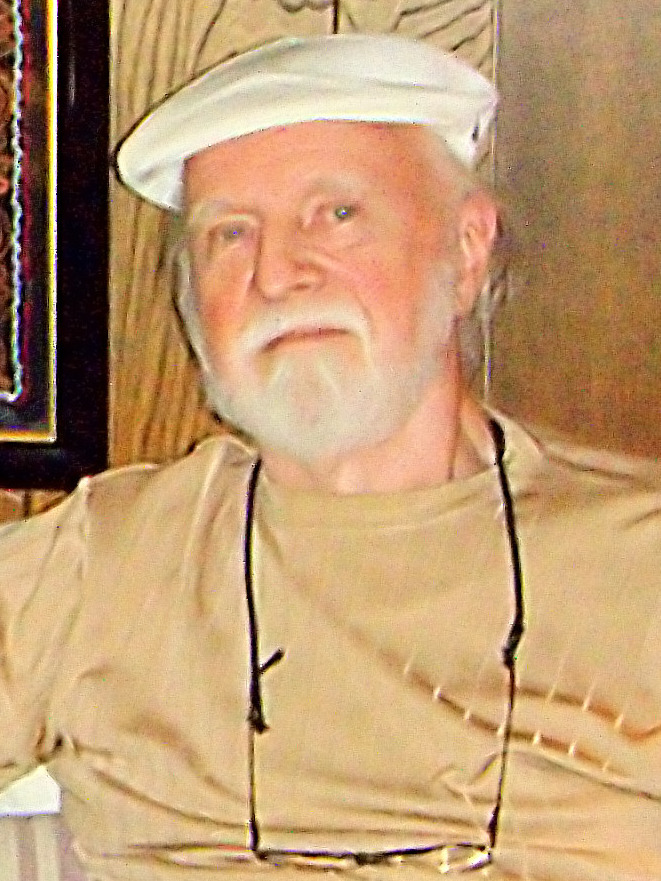
- Matheson in 2008
- Born: Richard Burton Matheson; February 20, 1926; Allendale, New Jersey, U.S.
- Died: June 23, 2013 (aged 87); Calabasas, California, U.S.
- Education: University of Missouri
- Occupations: Novelist; short story writer; screenwriter
- Spouse: Ruth Ann Woodson (m. 1952)
- Children: 4, including Richard Christian and Chris
- Writing career
- Pen name: Logan Swanson
- Period: 1950–2013
- Genres: Science fiction; fantasy; horror
- Notable works: I Am Legend; The Shrinking Man; A Stir of Echoes; Hell House; What Dreams May Come; Bid Time Return
- Notable awards: World Fantasy Award for Life Achievement; Bram Stoker Award for Lifetime Achievement; Science Fiction Hall of Fame

Signature
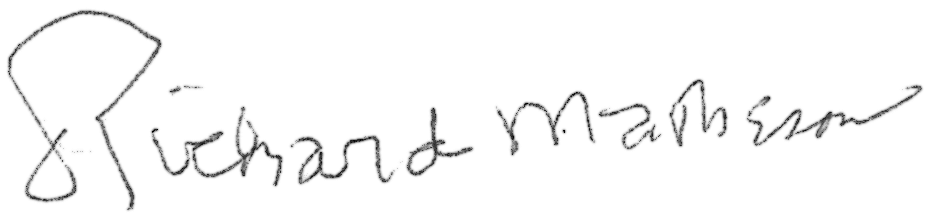

Richard Burton Matheson (February 20, 1926 – June 23, 2013) was an American author and screenwriter, who worked primarily in the fantasy, horror, and science fiction genres.

Matheson is best known as the author of I Am Legend, a 1954 science fiction horror novel that has been adapted for the screen three times. Matheson himself was co-writer of the first film version, The Last Man on Earth, starring Vincent Price, which was released in 1964. The other two adaptations were The Omega Man, starring Charlton Heston, and I Am Legend, with Will Smith. Matheson also wrote 16 television episodes of The Twilight Zone, including "Nightmare at 20,000 Feet", "Little Girl Lost" and "Steel", as well as several adaptations of Edgar Allan Poe stories for Roger Corman and American International Pictures – House of Usher, The Pit and the Pendulum, Tales of Terror and The Raven. He adapted his 1971 short story "Duel" as a screenplay, directed by Steven Spielberg as the television film of the same name that year.

In addition to I Am Legend and Duel, nine more of Matheson's novels and short stories have been adapted into films: The Shrinking Man (filmed as The Incredible Shrinking Man), Hell House (filmed as The Legend of Hell House), What Dreams May Come, Bid Time Return (filmed as Somewhere in Time), A Stir of Echoes, Steel (filmed as Real Steel), Button, Button (filmed as The Box), Ride the Nightmare (filmed as Cold Sweat), and Someone Is Bleeding (filmed as Les Seins de glace (Icy Breasts)). Both Steel and Button, Button had previously been episodes of The Twilight Zone.

== Early life ==
Matheson was born in Allendale, New Jersey, to Norwegian immigrants Bertolf and Fanny Matheson. They divorced when he was eight, and he was raised in Brooklyn, New York by his mother. His early writing influences were the film Dracula (1931), novels by Kenneth Roberts, and a poem which he read in the Brooklyn Eagle, where he published his first short story at age eight. He entered Brooklyn Technical High School in 1939, graduated in 1943, and served with the Army in Europe during World War II; this formed the basis for his 1960 novel The Beardless Warriors. Following his discharge, he received his undergraduate degree (via the G.I. Bill) from the Missouri School of Journalism at the University of Missouri in 1949 before moving to California.

== Career ==
=== 1950s and 1960s ===
Matheson's first-written novel, Hunger and Thirst, was ignored by publishers for several decades before eventually being published in 2010, but his short story "Born of Man and Woman" was published in The Magazine of Fantasy & Science Fiction's summer 1950 issue, the new quarterly's third issue, and attracted attention. It is the tale of a monstrous child chained by its parents in the cellar, written in the form of the creature's diary and using non-idiomatic English. Later that year, Matheson placed stories in the first and third issues of Galaxy Science Fiction, a new monthly. His first anthology of work was published in 1954. Between 1950 and 1971, he produced dozens of stories, frequently blending elements of the science fiction, horror, and fantasy genres.

Matheson was a member of the "Southern California Sorcerers" group in the 1950s and 1960s, an informal collective of West Coast-based writers which included Charles Beaumont, Ray Bradbury, George Clayton Johnson, William F. Nolan, Jerry Sohl, and others; collectively, these writers shared an affinity for an allegorically numinous storytelling approach that bridged the heretofore persistent lacuna between the relatively cloistered, professionally interlocked world of print science fiction (and such critical derivations as contemporaneous amateur press association-oriented science fiction fandom) with the "mainstream" New York City-based publishing industry (in particular, Bradbury was championed by the likes of Christopher Isherwood and Truman Capote) and the broader milieux of film and television (culminating in their recognition as a kind of informal brain trust retained by creator/showrunner Rod Serling on The Twilight Zone).

Matheson's first novel to be published, Someone Is Bleeding, appeared from Lion Books in 1953. In the 1950s, he published a handful of Western stories (later collected in By the Gun), and in the 1990s, he published Western novels such as Journal of the Gun Years, The Gunfight, The Memoirs of Wild Bill Hickok, and Shadow on the Sun.

Matheson's other early novels include The Shrinking Man (1956, filmed in 1957 as The Incredible Shrinking Man, again from Matheson's own screenplay, and in 2025 as L'Homme qui rétrécit [fr]) and a science fiction vampire novel, I Am Legend (1954, filmed as The Last Man on Earth in 1964, The Omega Man in 1971, and I Am Legend in 2007). In 1960, Matheson published The Beardless Warriors, a non-fantastic, autobiographical novel about teenage American soldiers in World War II. It was filmed in 1967 as The Young Warriors, though most of Matheson's plot was jettisoned.

Matheson wrote teleplays for several television programs, including the Westerns Cheyenne, Have Gun – Will Travel, and Lawman. He also wrote the Star Trek episode "The Enemy Within" (1966). However, he is most closely associated with the American TV series The Twilight Zone, for which he wrote more than a dozen episodes, including "Steel" (1963), "Nightmare at 20,000 Feet" (1963), "Little Girl Lost" (1962), and "Death Ship" (1963). For all of his Twilight Zone scripts, Matheson wrote the introductory and closing statements spoken by creator Rod Serling. He adapted five works of Edgar Allan Poe for Roger Corman's Poe series, including House of Usher (1960), The Pit and the Pendulum (1961), and The Raven (1963). He was one of the key screenwriters in Corman's career.

For Hammer Film Productions, Matheson wrote the screenplay for Fanatic (1965; US title: Die! Die! My Darling!), starring Tallulah Bankhead and Stefanie Powers and based on the novel Nightmare by Anne Blaisdell; he also adapted for Hammer Dennis Wheatley's The Devil Rides Out (1968).

=== 1970s and 1980s ===
In 1971, Matheson's short story "Duel" was adapted into the TV movie of the same name. In 1973, Matheson earned an Edgar Award from the Mystery Writers of America for his teleplay for The Night Stalker (1972), one of two TV movies written by Matheson for producer Dan Curtis, the other being The Night Strangler (1973), which preceded the TV series Kolchak: The Night Stalker. Matheson worked extensively with Curtis; he adapted Dracula for Curtis's 1974 television movie Bram Stoker's Dracula, and Curtis's 1977 television anthology film Dead of Night features three stories written for the screen by Matheson: "Second Chance" (based on the story by Jack Finney); "No Such Thing as a Vampire" (based on Matheson's story of the same name); and "Bobby", an original script written for this anthology by Matheson.

Three of his short stories were filmed together as Trilogy of Terror (1975), including "Prey" (initially published in the April 1969 issue of Playboy magazine), a tale of a Zuni warrior fetish doll. The doll later reappeared in the final segment of the belated sequel to the first movie, Trilogy of Terror II (1996), and "Bobby" from Dead of Night was refilmed with different actors for the second segment of the film.

Other Matheson novels adapted into films in the 1970s include Bid Time Return (1975, released as Somewhere in Time in 1980), and Hell House (1971, released as The Legend of Hell House in 1973), both adapted and scripted by Matheson himself.

In the 1980s, Matheson published the novel Earthbound, wrote several screenplays for the TV series Amazing Stories, and continued to publish short fiction.

=== 1990s ===
Matheson published four Western novels in this decade, as well as the suspense novel Seven Steps to Midnight (1993) and the darkly comic locked-room mystery novel Now You See It ... (1995), dedicated to Robert Bloch.

He also wrote the screenplays for several movies, including the comedy Loose Cannons (1990) and the television biopic The Dreamer of Oz: The L. Frank Baum Story (1990), as well as a segment of Twilight Zone: Rod Serling's Lost Classics (1994) and segments of Trilogy of Terror II. Matheson continued to write short stories, and two more of his novels were adapted by others for the big screen: What Dreams May Come (1998) and A Stir of Echoes (1999, as Stir of Echoes). In 1999, Matheson published a non-fiction work, The Path, inspired by his interest in psychic phenomena.

=== 21st century ===
Many previously unpublished novels by Matheson appeared late in his career, as did various collections of his work and previously unpublished screenplays. He also wrote new works, such as the suspense novel Hunted Past Reason (2002) and the children's illustrated fantasy Abu and the 7 Marvels (2002).

== Style ==
Several of Matheson's stories, including "Third from the Sun" (1950), "Deadline" (1959), and "Button, Button" (1970), are simple sketches with twist endings; others, like "Trespass" (1953), "Being" (1954), and "Mute" (1962), explore their characters' dilemmas over 20 or 30 pages. Some tales, such as "The Doll that Does Everything" (1954) and "The Funeral" (1955), incorporate satirical humor at the expense of genre clichés, and are written in bombastic prose that differed from Matheson's usual pared-down style. Others, like "The Test" (1954) and "Steel" (1956), portray the moral and physical struggles of ordinary people, rather than those of scientists and superheroes, in situations which are at once futuristic and quotidian. Still others, such as "Mad House" (1953), "The Curious Child" (1954) and "Duel" (1971), are tales of paranoia, in which the commonplace environment of the present day becomes inexplicably alien or threatening.

=== Sources of inspiration ===
Matheson cited specific inspirations for many of his works. Duel was derived from an incident in which he and friend Jerry Sohl were dangerously tailgated by a large truck on the same day as the assassination of John F. Kennedy.

According to film critic Roger Ebert, Matheson's scientific approach to the supernatural in I Am Legend and other novels from the 1950s and early 1960s "anticipated pseudorealistic fantasy novels like Rosemary's Baby and The Exorcist."

== Personal life and death ==
In 1952, Matheson married Ruth Ann Woodson, whom he met in California. They had four children: Bettina Mayberry, Richard Christian, Christopher Matheson and Ali Marie Matheson. Richard, Chris, and Ali became writers of fiction and screenplays.

Matheson died on June 23, 2013, at his home in Calabasas, California, at the age of 87.

== Awards ==
Matheson received the World Fantasy Award for Life Achievement in 1984 and the Bram Stoker Award for Lifetime Achievement from the Horror Writers Association in 1991. In 1993, he won the World Horror Convention Grand Master Award. The Science Fiction Hall of Fame inducted him in 2010.

At the annual World Fantasy Conventions, he won two judged, annual literary awards for particular works: World Fantasy Awards for Bid Time Return as the best novel of 1975 and Richard Matheson: Collected Stories as the best collection of 1989.

In 1989, he won the Bram Stoker Award for best Fiction Collection for Richard Matheson: Collected Stories & was nominated in 2002 for the Bram Stoker Award for Work for Young Readers for Abu and the 7 Marvels.

In 1991 he won the Spur Award for Best Western Novel for Journal of the Gun Years.

In 2008, he won the Geffen Award for Science Fiction & the Tähtivaeltaja Award for I Am Legend.

Matheson died just days before he was due to receive the Visionary Award at the 39th Saturn Awards ceremony. As a tribute, the ceremony was dedicated to him and the award was presented posthumously. Academy president Robert Holguin said, "Richard's accomplishments will live on forever in the imaginations of everyone who read or saw his inspired and inimitable work."

== Influence ==
=== Other writers ===
Stephen King has listed Matheson as a creative influence, and his novels Cell (2006) and Elevation (2018) are dedicated to Matheson, along with filmmaker George A. Romero. Romero frequently acknowledged Matheson as an inspiration and listed the shambling vampire creatures that appear in The Last Man on Earth, the first film version of I Am Legend, as the inspiration for the zombie "ghouls" he envisioned in Night of the Living Dead.

Anne Rice stated that Matheson's short story "Dress of White Silk" was an early influence on her interest in vampires and fantasy fiction.

=== Directors ===
After his death, several figures offered tributes to his life and work. Director Steven Spielberg said:

Richard Matheson's ironic and iconic imagination created seminal science-fiction stories and gave me my first break when he wrote the short story and screenplay for Duel. His Twilight Zones were among my favorites, and he recently worked with us on Real Steel. For me, he is in the same category as Bradbury and Asimov.

Another frequent collaborator, Roger Corman, said:

Richard Matheson was a close friend and the best screenwriter I ever worked with. I always shot his first draft. I will miss him.

On Twitter, director Edgar Wright wrote, "If it's true that the great Richard Matheson has passed away, 140 characters can't begin to cover what he has given the sci fi & horror genre." Director Richard Kelly added, "I loved Richard Matheson's writing and it was a huge honor getting to adapt his story 'Button, Button' into a film. RIP."

== Works ==
=== Novels ===
- Someone Is Bleeding (1953); filmed as Icy Breasts
- Fury on Sunday (1953)
- I Am Legend (1954); filmed as The Last Man on Earth (1964), The Omega Man (1971), I Am Omega (2007) and I Am Legend (2007)
- The Shrinking Man (1956); filmed as The Incredible Shrinking Man (1957) and subsequently reprinted under that title; also the basis of the film The Incredible Shrinking Woman (1981)
- A Stir of Echoes (1958); filmed as Stir of Echoes (1999)
- Ride the Nightmare (1959); adapted as an episode of The Alfred Hitchcock Hour and later filmed as Cold Sweat (1970)
- The Beardless Warriors (1960); filmed as The Young Warriors (1967)
- The Comedy of Terrors (1964); adapted by Elsie Lee from Matheson's screenplay, filmed as The Comedy of Terrors (1963)
- Hell House (1971); filmed as The Legend of Hell House (1973)
- Bid Time Return (1975); filmed as Somewhere in Time (1980) and subsequently reprinted under that title
- What Dreams May Come (1978); filmed as What Dreams May Come (1998)
- Earthbound (Playboy Publications, 1982), as by Logan Swanson – editorially abridged version; restored text published as by Richard Matheson, UK: Robinson Books, 1989
- Journal of the Gun Years (1992)
- The Gunfight (1993)
- 7 Steps to Midnight (1993)
- Shadow on the Sun (1994)
- Now You See It ... (1995)
- The Memoirs of Wild Bill Hickok (1996)
- Passion Play (2000)
- Hunger and Thirst (2000)
- Camp Pleasant (2001)
- Abu and the Seven Marvels (2002) (with William Stout)
- Hunted Past Reason (2002)
- Come Fygures, Come Shadowes (2003)
- Woman (2005)
- The Link (2006)
- Other Kingdoms (2011)
- Generations (2012)
- Kolchak: The Night Stalker: Nightkillers (2017); co-written by Chuck Miller, based on an unfilmed teleplay for the TV series

=== Short stories ===
- "Born of Man and Woman" (1950)
- "Third from the Sun" (1950); adapted as a Twilight Zone episode (1960)
- "The Waker Dreams" (a.k.a. "When the Waker Sleeps") (1950)
- "Blood Son" (1951)
- "Through Channels" (1951)
- "Clothes Make the Man" (1951)
- "Return" (1951)
- "The Thing" (1951)
- "Witch War" (1951)
- "Dress of White Silk" (1951)
- "F---" (a.k.a. "The Foodlegger") (1952)
- "Shipshape Home" (1952)
- "SRL Ad" (1952)
- "Advance Notice" (a.k.a. "Letter to the Editor") (1952)
- "Lover, When You're Near Me" (1952)
- "Brother to the Machine" (1952)
- "To Fit the Crime" (1952)
- "The Wedding" (1953)
- "Wet Straw" (1953)
- "Long Distance Call" (a.k.a. "Sorry, Right Number") (1953)
- "Slaughter House" (1953)
- "Mad House" (1953)
- "The Last Day" (1953)
- "Lazarus II" (1953)
- "Legion of Plotters" (1953)
- "Death Ship" (1953); adapted as a Twilight Zone episode (1963)
- "Disappearing Act" (1953); adapted as a Twilight Zone episode (1959)
- "The Disinheritors" (1953)
- "Dying Room Only" (1953)
- "Full Circle" (1953)
- "Mother by Protest" (a.k.a. "Trespass") (1953)
- "Little Girl Lost" (1953); adapted as a Twilight Zone episode (1962)
- "Being" (1954)
- "The Curious Child" (1954)
- "When Day Is Dun" (1954)
- "Dance of the Dead" (1954); adapted as a Masters of Horror episode (2005)
- "The Man Who Made the World" (1954)
- "The Traveller" (1954)
- "The Test" (1954)
- "The Conqueror" (1954)
- "Dear Diary" (1954)
- "The Doll That Does Everything" (1954)
- "Descent" (1954)
- "Miss Stardust" (1955)
- "The Funeral" (1955); adapted as story segment for Rod Serling's Night Gallery (1972)
- "Too Proud to Lose" (1955)
- "One for the Books" (1955)
- "Pattern for Survival" (1955)
- "A Flourish of Strumpets" (1956)
- "The Splendid Source" (1956); adapted as a Family Guy episode
- "Steel" (1956); adapted as a Twilight Zone episode (1963); loosely filmed as Real Steel (2011)
- "The Children of Noah" (1957)
- "A Visit to Santa Claus" (a.k.a. "I'll Make It Look Good", as Logan Swanson) (1957)
- "The Holiday Man" (1957)
- "Old Haunts" (1957)
- "The Distributor" (1958)
- "The Edge" (1958)
- "Lemmings" (1958)
- "Now Die in It" (1958)
- "Mantage" (1959)
- "Deadline" (1959)
- "The Creeping Terror" (a.k.a. "A Touch of Grapefruit") (1959)
- "No Such Thing as a Vampire" (1959); adapted as segment of the TV film Dead of Night (1977)
- "Big Surprise" (a.k.a. "What Was in the Box") (1959); adapted as a Night Gallery short
- "Crickets" (1960)
- "Day of Reckoning" (a.k.a. "The Faces," "Graveyard Shift") (1960)
- "First Anniversary" (1960); adapted as an Outer Limits episode (1996)
- "From Shadowed Places" (1960)
- "Nightmare at 20,000 Feet" (1961); adapted as a Twilight Zone episode in 1963, as segment four of Twilight Zone: The Movie in 1983, and as one of the Twilight Zone radio dramas. Loosely inspired "Nightmare at 30,000 Feet" in the 2019 revival series. Has also been parodied numerous times, most notably as a segment of the fourth installment of The Simpsons' Treehouse of Horror series.
- "Finger Prints" (1962)
- "Mute" (1962); adapted as a Twilight Zone episode (1963)
- "The Likeness of Julie" (as Logan Swanson) (1962); adapted into "Julie" in the 1975 TV film Trilogy of Terror
- "The Jazz Machine" (1963)
- "Crescendo" (a.k.a. "Shock Wave") (1963)
- "Girl of My Dreams" (1963); adapted by Robert Bloch and Michael J. Bird as an episode of the 1968 Hammer TV series Journey to the Unknown
- "'Tis the Season to Be Jelly" (1963)
- "Deus Ex Machina" (1963)
- "Interest" (1965)
- "A Drink of Water" (1967)
- "Needle in the Heart" (a.k.a. "Therese") (1969); adapted into "Millicent and Therese" in the 1975 TV anthology film Trilogy of Terror
- "Prey" (1969); adapted into "Amelia" in the 1975 TV anthology film Trilogy of Terror
- "Button, Button" (1970); filmed as a The Twilight Zone episode in 1986; filmed as The Box (2009)
- "'Til Death Do Us Part" (1970)
- "By Appointment Only" (1970)
- "The Finishing Touches" (1970)
- "Duel" (1971); filmed as Duel (1971)
- "Leo Rising" (1972)
- "Where There's a Will" (with Richard Christian Matheson) (1980)
- "And Now I'm Waiting" (1983)
- "Blunder Buss" (1984)
- "Getting Together" (1986)
- "Buried Talents" (1987)
- "The Near Departed" (1987)
- "Shoo Fly" (1988)
- "Person to Person" (1989)
- "CU: Mannix" (1991)
- "Two O'Clock Session" (1991)
- "The Doll"; adapted as an Amazing Stories episode (1986)
- "Go West, Young Man" (1993)
- "Gunsight" (1993)
- "Little Jack Cornered" (1993)
- "Of Death and Thirty Minutes" (1993)
- "Always Before Your Voice" (1999)
- "Relics" (1999)
- "And in Sorrow" (2000)
- "The Prisoner" (2001)
- "Purge Among Peanuts" (2001)
- "He Wanted to Live" (2002)
- "The Last Blah in the Etc." (a.k.a. "All and Only Silence") (2002)
- "Life Size" (2002)
- "Maybe You Remember Him" (2002)
- "Mirror, Mirror..." (2002)
- "Phone Call From Across The Street" (2002)
- "Professor Fritz and the Runaway House" (2002)
- "That Was Yesterday" (2002)
- "Man With a Club" (2003)
- "Counterfeit Bills" (2004)
- "Haircut" (2006)
- "Life Size" (2008)
- "An Element Never Forgets" (2010)
- "Backteria" (2011)

=== Short story collections ===
- Born of Man and Woman (1954)
- The Shores of Space (1957)
- Shock! (1961)
- Shock 2 (1964)
- Shock 3 (1966)
- Shock Waves (1970); published as Shock 4 in the UK (1980)
- Button, Button (1970); basis for the movie The Box (2009)
- Richard Matheson: Collected Stories (1989)
- By the Gun (1993)
- Nightmare at 20,000 Feet (2002)
- Pride (2002); co-written with Richard Christian Matheson
- Duel (2002)
- Offbeat: Uncollected Stories (2002)
- Darker Places (2004)
- Unrealized Dreams (2004)
- Duel and the Distributor (2005); previously unpublished screenplays of these two stories
- Button, Button: Uncanny Stories (2008)
- Uncollected Matheson: Volume 1 (2008)
- Uncollected Matheson: Volume 2 (2010)
- Steel: And Other Stories (2011)
- Bakteria and Other Improbable Tales (2011) (e-book exclusive)
- The Best of Richard Matheson (2017)

=== Films ===
For television films, see Television section below.

- The Incredible Shrinking Man (1957)
- The Beat Generation (1959)
- House of Usher (1960)
- Master of the World (1961)
- The Pit and the Pendulum (1961)
- Burn Witch Burn (1962); a.k.a. Night of the Eagle (screenplay co-written with Charles Beaumont and George Baxt, based on the novel Conjure Wife by Fritz Leiber)
- Tales of Terror (1962)
- The Raven (1963)
- The Comedy of Terrors (1963)
- The Last Man on Earth (as "Logan Swanson", based on his novel I Am Legend) (1964)
- Fanatic (1965)
- The Young Warriors (based on his novel The Beardless Warriors) (1967)
- The Devil Rides Out (based on the novel by Dennis Wheatley) (1968)
- De Sade (1969)
- Cold Sweat (based on his novel Ride the Nightmare) (1970)
- The Omega Man (based on his novel I Am Legend) (1971)
- The Legend of Hell House (based on his novel Hell House) (1973)
- Icy Breasts (based on his novel Someone Is Bleeding) (1974)
- Somewhere in Time (based on his novel Bid Time Return) (1980)
- Twilight Zone: The Movie: fourth segment, "Nightmare at 20,000 Feet" (1983)
- Jaws 3-D (1983)
- Loose Cannons (1990)
- What Dreams May Come (based on his novel) (1998)
- Stir of Echoes (1999) (based on his novel)
- I Am Legend (based on his novel) (2007)
- The Box (based on his short story "Button, Button") (2009)
- Real Steel (based on his short story "Steel") (2011)

=== Television ===
- Buckskin: "Act of Faith" (1959)
- Wanted Dead or Alive: "The Healing Woman" (1959)
- The Twilight Zone: (16 episodes) (1959–1964)
- Have Gun Will Travel: "The Lady on The Wall" (1960)
- Bourbon Street Beat: "Target of Hate" (1960)
- Cheyenne: "Home Is the Brave" (1960)
- Lawman (Six episodes) (1960–1962)
- Thriller: "The Return of Andrew Bentley" (1961)
- Combat!: "Forgotten Front" (as Logan Swanson) (1962)
- The Alfred Hitchcock Hour: "Ride the Nightmare" (1962)
- The Alfred Hitchcock Hour: "The Thirty-First of February" (1963)
- The Girl from U.N.C.L.E.: "The Atlantis Affair" (1966)
- Bob Hope Presents The Chrysler Theater: "Time of Flight" (1966)
- Star Trek: The Original Series: "The Enemy Within" (1966)
- Duel (1971)
- The Night Stalker (1972)
- Night Gallery (1972): "The Funeral" (1972)
- The Night Strangler (1973)
- Dying Room Only (1973)
- Circle of Fear (1973) (originally titled Ghost Story)
- Bram Stoker's Dracula (1974)
- Scream of the Wolf (1974)
- The Morning After (1974)
- Trilogy of Terror (1975) (TV anthology film, directed by Dan Curtis)
- Dead of Night (1977) (TV anthology film, directed by Dan Curtis)
- The Strange Possession of Mrs. Oliver (1977)
- The Martian Chronicles mini-series (1979, 1980)
- Twilight Zone: "Button, Button" (as Logan Swanson) (1986)
- Amazing Stories: "The Doll" (1986)
- Amazing Stories: "One for the Books" (1987)
- The Dreamer of Oz: The L. Frank Baum Story (1990)
- Rod Serling's Lost Classics (1994)
- The Outer Limits: "First Anniversary" (1996)
- Trilogy of Terror II (1996) (TV anthology film, directed by Dan Curtis)

=== Nonfiction ===
- The Path: Metaphysics for the 90s (1993)
- The Path: A New Look at Reality (1999)
