= Joe Maross =

American actor (1923–2009)

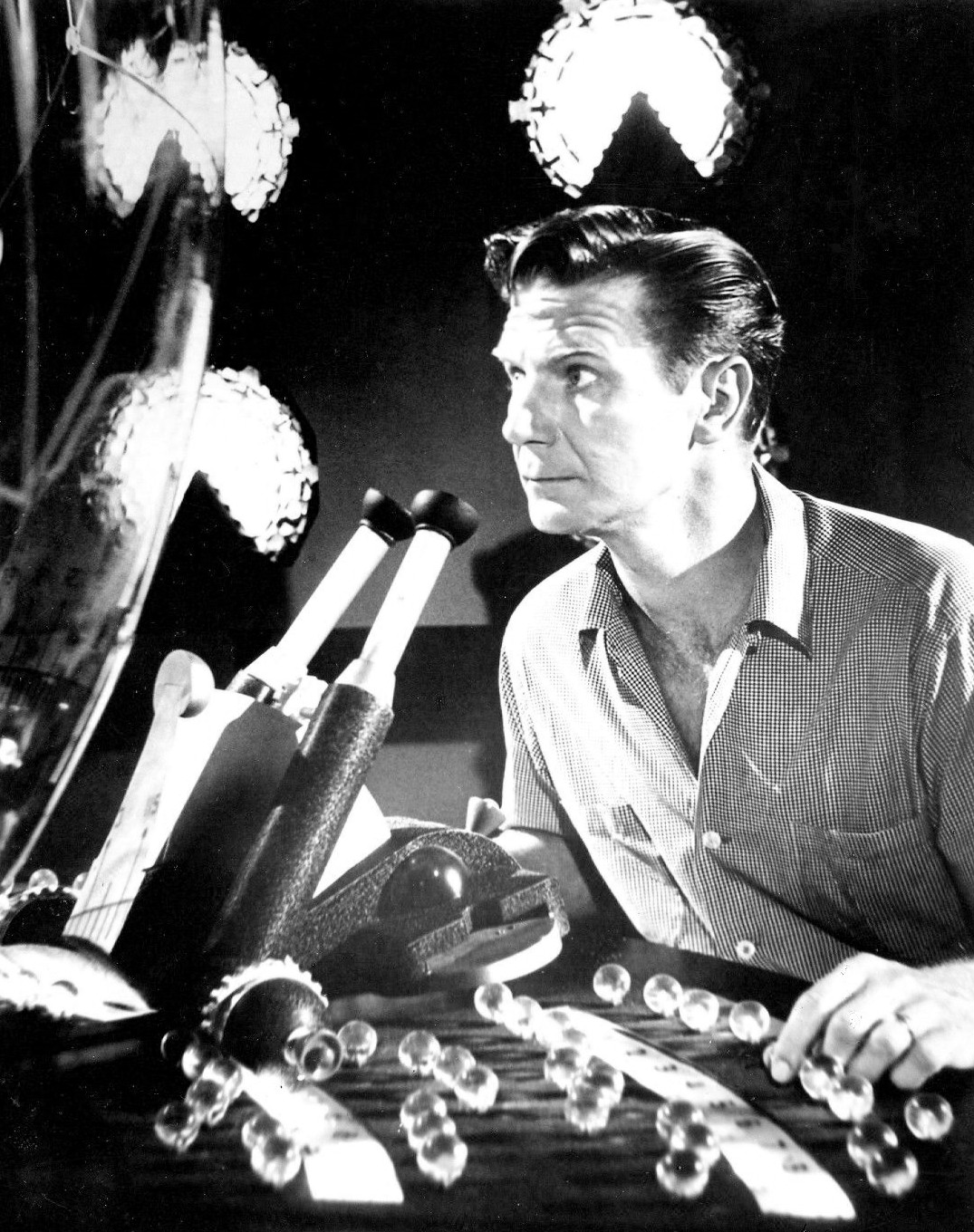
- Maross in The Twilight Zone episode "Third from the Sun" (1960)
- Born: Joseph Raymond Maross; February 7, 1923; Barnesboro, Pennsylvania
- Died: November 7, 2009 (aged 86); Glendale, California
- Education: Yale University
- Occupation: Actor
- Spouse: Carol Kelly (m. 1958; div. 1962)

Joseph Raymond Maross (February 7, 1923 – November 7, 2009) was an American stage, film, and television actor whose career spanned over four decades. Working predominantly on television in supporting roles or as a guest star, Maross performed in a wide variety of series and television movies from the early 1950s to the mid-1980s.

== Early life ==
Born in Barnesboro, Pennsylvania, Maross served in the U.S. Marine Corps during World War II and was stationed in Hawaii. He attended Yale University after the war and received his theater arts degree there in 1947.

== Career ==
Maross's Broadway credits include Ladies Night in a Turkish Bath (1949) and The Innkeepers (1955). The first feature film in which he was cast is the 1958 World War II drama Run Silent, Run Deep. He was in subsequent productions such as Elmer Gantry, Zig Zag, Sometimes a Great Notion, The Salzburg Connection, and Rich and Famous.

Maross achieved greater acting success on television, where he became a familiar face to American audiences, especially during the 1950s and 1960s. He had roles in the 1959 episode "A Personal Matter" on Alfred Hitchcock Presents and in three episodes of Perry Mason: "The Case of the Crying Cherub" (1960), "The Case of the Lavender Lipstick", and "The Case of the Potted Planter" (1963). He also appears in supporting roles or as a guest star in Behind Closed Doors, Mission: Impossible, The Fugitive, The Outer Limits, Wanted: Dead or Alive, The Invaders, Gunsmoke, The Virginian, 12 O'Clock High, Kentucky Jones, The Time Tunnel (in an episode in which he portrays George Armstrong Custer), Hawaii Five-O, the Mannix episode "Cry Silence", Hawkins, The Rockford Files, the Cannon episodes "Call Unicorn" and "Blood Lines", the Combat! episode "A Little Jazz", and the Bonanza episode "Escape to Ponderosa". Maross is a central character as well in two episodes of The Twilight Zone: "Third from the Sun" and "The Little People". While the frequency of his work on television began to decline by the late 1970s, Maross continued to perform into the 1980s. An example of this is his portrayal of Captain Mike Benton in the series Code Red, which aired for one season on ABC from 1981 to 1982.

== Support for film organizations ==
Maross was a founding member of Projects 58, an acting, writing and directing group based in Los Angeles. He was also a voting member of the Academy of Motion Picture Arts and Sciences.

== Death ==
In November 2009, at age 86, Maross died of cardiac arrest at a convalescent hospital in Glendale, California.

== Filmography ==
Year	Title	Role	Notes
1958	Run Silent, Run Deep	Chief Kohler	
1958	The Restless Gun	Kaleel	Episode: "Hang and be Damned"
1958	Gunsmoke	Jim Branch	Season 3 Episode 20: "Claustrophobia"
1959	Alfred Hitchcock Presents	Joe Philips	S4:E15, "A Personal Matter"
1960	Elmer Gantry	Pete	
1960	Bonanza	Jimmy Sutton	S1:E25, "Escape to Ponderosa"
1960	Perry Mason	David Lambert	S3:E20, "The Case of the Crying Cherub"
1960	Perry Mason	Assistant District Attorney Ernest Helming	S4:E5, "The Case of the Lavender Lipstick"
1960	The Twilight Zone	Jerry Riden	S1:E14, "Third from the Sun"
1961	Alfred Hitchcock Presents	Tony Coe	S6:E30, "You Can't Trust a Man"
1962	The Twilight Zone	Peter Craig	S3:E28, "The Little People"
1962	Gunsmoke	Dean Beard	Season 7 Episode 24: "Coventry"
1963	Perry Mason	Nelson Tarr	S6:E27, "The Case of the Potted Planter"
1963	The Virginian	Landegger	S1:E26, "Echo of Another Day"
1963	The Virginian	Homer Slattery	Season 2 Episode 7: "Brother Thaddeus"
1965	Kentucky Jones	Ned Scratch	Season 1 Episode 21: "Bad Penny"
1965	Gunsmoke	Charlie Britton	Season 10 Episode 19: “Chief Joseph"
1967	Mission: Impossible	Frank Bates	Season 1 Episode 17: "The Frame"
1967	Mission: Impossible	Mark Walters	Season 2 Episode 1: "The Widow"
1968	The Virginian	Buck Stargil	S7:E8, "Ride to Misadventure"
1970	Zig Zag	Lieutenant Max Hines	
1970	Mission: Impossible	Sheriff Brad Owens	Season 5 Episode 4: "Homecoming"
1971	Sometimes a Great Notion	Floyd Evenwrite	
1971	Mission: Impossible	Clegg	Season 6 Episode 14: "The Connection"
1972	The Salzburg Connection	Chuck	
1973	Mission: Impossible	Jay Braddock	Season 7 Episode 18: "The Fighter"
1976	Emergency!	Captain Hook "Hookrader"	S6:E8, "Captain Hook"
1976	The Six Million Dollar Man	Gustav Tokar	S3:E13, "The Golden Pharaoh"
1976	The Rockford Files	Perry Lefcourt	S3:E11, "The Trouble with Warren"
1977	Sixth and Main	Peanuts	
1978	Wonder Woman	Shubert	S3:E4, "The Fine Art of Crime"
1979	The Rockford Files	Al Corbett	Season 5 Episode 15: "The Deuce"
1981	Rich and Famous	Martin Fornam	
