= Born of Man and Woman =

Short story by Richard Matheson

- Short story by Richard Matheson
- Language: English
- Genre: Science fiction

Publication
- Published in: The Magazine of Fantasy and Science Fiction
- Publication date: July 1950
- Publication place: USA
- Media type: Print (Magazine)

"Born of Man and Woman" is a science fiction short story by American writer Richard Matheson, originally published in the July 1950 issue of The Magazine of Fantasy and Science Fiction. It was his first professional sale, written when he was twenty-two years old. It became the title piece in Matheson's first short story collection in 1954.

== Plot summary ==
The story is written in the form of an internal "diary" in broken English kept by what the reader presumes is a deformed child (gender unspecified) chained in the basement by their violently abusive parents (the story makes it clear that the man and woman who have imprisoned the child are the child's biological parents when the child recalls the man commenting about how, in stark contrast to the child, "Mother [is] so pretty and me decent[-looking] enough."). The child-narrator can sometimes pull their chain from the wall and observe the outside world through the basement window. On one occasion they even manage to sneak upstairs, although they have difficulty because their body drips green fluid that causes their feet to stick to the stairs. They eavesdrop on a dinner party but is discovered by their parents, returned to the basement, and violently beaten. On another occasion they climb to a small window and observe a little girl (possibly their "normal" sister, who is apparently unaware of the chained child's existence), playing with other little girls and boys, whom the narrator, having no concept of ordinary childhood, can only describe as "little mothers" and "little fathers". One of the boys sees the child at the window, and they are again beaten as a result. In a final incident, the girl brings her pet cat (which the chained child can only describe as a creature with "pointy ears") into the basement. The chained child hides from them in a coal bin, but when the cat discovers, hisses, and bites the child, the child crushes the cat to death.

The story ends with the child-narrator, again being beaten, knocking a stick from their father's hands, which sends the suddenly frightened man fleeing upstairs. The child resolves that if their parents abuse it again, it will turn violent, as it had once before, noting that it ran along the walls and hung down "with all [its] legs", revealing that the child is far more deformed than the reader may have presumed, and in fact an actual "monster".

== Reception ==
"Born of Man and Woman" was among the stories selected in 1970 by the Science Fiction Writers of America as one of the best science fiction short stories published before the creation of the Nebula Awards. As such, it was published in The Science Fiction Hall of Fame Volume One, 1929-1964.

In 2001, it was a finalist for the Retro-Hugo Award for Best Short Story for 1951.

== Sequel ==
A sequel to the story, "She Screech Like Me" by Michael A. Arnzen, was published in 2009. In this story the parents have been killed by the child, and their sister, who is not upset, hides the child from the world. The children's maternal grandmother arrives at the home and delights in the child, but shows an aversion to the normal daughter. The grandmother locks the daughter in the cellar, telling the child that she is not "like us" and then teaches the child (who is implied to be female) her name.
