= Sixth and Main =

- Directed by: Christopher Cain
- Written by: Christopher Cain
- Produced by: Christopher Cain
- Starring: Leslie Nielsen; Beverly Garland; Roddy McDowall; Leo Penn; Joe Maross; Bard Stevens; Sharon Thomas
- Cinematography: Hilyard John Brown
- Edited by: Ken Johnson
- Music by: Bob Summers
- Distributed by: National Cinema Network
- Release date: 1977
- Country: United States
- Language: English

Sixth and Main is a 1977 American drama film directed by Christopher Cain and starring Leslie Nielsen and Beverly Garland.

== Plot ==
Monica (Beverly Garland) decides to spend time in the slums of Los Angeles to absorb the atmosphere for a book she is planning to write. She becomes interested in the tall, quiet derelict who calls himself John Doe (Leslie Nielsen), whose transient friends include an unlicensed doctor known as Doc (Leo Penn), a legless newsstand operator named Skateboard (Roddy McDowall), and the heroin addict and hooker Peanut (Gammy Burdett). She trails John Doe to his home, a rundown trailer in a junkyard. She decides to rehabilitate him. She does not know that he was formerly a successful screenwriter.

== Cast ==
Sixth and Main stars Leslie Nielsen as "John Doe", Roddy McDowall as "Skateboard", Leo Penn as "Doc", and Beverly Garland as "Monica Cord". Other actors include Gammy Burdett, Joe Maross, Bill Erwin and Edwin Mills.

== Production ==
Sixth and Main is a 104 minute color film that was released through National Cinema in September 1977. Christopher Cain was writer, producer and director.

== Critical reception ==
Variety (31 August 1977) described it as a "very professionally made low-budgeter... The film is earthy without being vulgar. The Hollywood Reporter (31 August 1977) praised Chris Cain's skillful direction and Beverly Garland's acting, but said of the plot that it "waffles between wonderfully naturalistic scenes and whole passages filled with overwrought idealistic notions."

== Sources ==
- Del Vecchio, Deborah (December 19, 2012), Beverly Garland: Her Life and Career, McFarland, p. 220, ISBN 9780786465019
- Elley, Derek (2000), Variety Portable Movie Guide, Penguin Group (USA) Incorporated, ISBN 9780425175507
- Mitchell, Charles P. (2004). Filmography of Social Issues: A Reference Guide. Greenwood Press. p. 220. ISBN 978-0-313-32037-8.
- Nash, Jay Robert; Ross, Stanley Ralph (1985), The Motion Picture Guide, vol. 7, Cinebooks, ISBN 9780933997073
