= The Beardless Warriors =

Novel by Richard Matheson

- Cover of the first edition
- Author: Richard Matheson
- Language: English
- Genre: War
- Publisher: Little, Brown
- Publication date: August 22, 1960
- Publication place: United States
- Media type: Hardcover & Paperback
- Pages: 245 (paperback edition)
- OCLC: 861764005

The Beardless Warriors is a 1960 World War II novel by American writer Richard Matheson. It was based on his experiences as a young infantryman in the 87th Division in France and Germany.

== Plot synopsis ==
Set in late 1944 Germany, during the assault on the Siegfried Line, the novel follows 15 days in a US Army Rifle Squad led by the venerable Sergeant Cooley. Everett “Hack” Hackermeyer, a troubled 18-year-old from a hellish family upbringing, is just one of several teenage soldiers. Over the course of the story, Hackermeyer will come to realize the value of his own life and shed his guarded cynicism.

== Adaptation ==
It was filmed by Universal Pictures in 1966 as The Young Warriors. Most of Matheson's story was jettisoned in order to build the film around stock footage from the Audie Murphy film To Hell and Back. The film starred Universal contract players Steve Carlson, Jonathan Daly, and Robert Pine, with James Drury as the sergeant.
