= Hell House (novel) =

Novel by Richard Matheson

- First edition
- Author: Richard Matheson
- Language: English
- Genre: Horror
- Publisher: Viking Press
- Publication date: 1971
- Publication place: United States
- Media type: Print (Hardback & Paperback)
- Pages: 288
- ISBN: 0-312-86885-5
- OCLC: 41944575

Hell House is a horror novel by American novelist Richard Matheson, published in 1971.

== Plot ==
The story centers on four people: Dr. Lionel Barrett, a physicist with an interest in parapsychology, his wife Edith, and two mediums: Florence Tanner, a spiritualist, and Benjamin Franklin Fischer, who had visited the haunted house 30 years prior.

Barrett, Tanner, and Fischer are hired by dying millionaire William Reinhardt Deutsch to investigate the possibility of life after death for a week. To this end, they must enter the infamous Belasco House in Maine, regarded as the most haunted house in the world. The house is called "Hell House" due to the horrible acts of blasphemy and perversion that occurred there under the silent influence and supervision of Emeric Belasco. Meanwhile, there are other mysteries to be found in Hell House, such as the supposed murder of Emeric Belasco's son, Daniel Myron Belasco, and the puzzle as to why a majority of people who enter the home are dead by the end of their visit.

The novel combines supernatural horror with mystery as the researchers attempt to investigate the haunting of the house while their sanity is subtly undermined by its sinister supernatural influence. The home exploits its guests' deepest desires and attempts to turn people against one another during the course of their visit.

During the investigation, various influences begin to affect each character's personal weaknesses: Florence through her belief in spiritualism and her over-eagerness to rid the house of its evil; Dr. Barrett through his almost-arrogant disbelief in/disregard for spiritualism, his debilitated physical condition (having suffered from polio when young), and his belief in science and the power of the Reversor machine he has built to rid the house of its haunting; Edith through her personal fears, insecurities, and pent-up sexual desires; and Fischer through his deliberate inaction (which he calls "caution"). Hell House's potency comes from its apparent ability to corrupt those who enter it before bringing about their destruction, both mental and physical.

== Adaptations ==
In 1973 the novel was made into the film The Legend of Hell House, starring Pamela Franklin, Roddy McDowall, Clive Revill, and Gayle Hunnicutt. Matheson wrote the screenplay.

The story was also adapted as a comic book mini-series, Richard Matheson's Hell House, written by Ian Edginton, with art by Simon Fraser. It was published in 2004 by IDW Publishing and collected as a trade paperback in 2008.

Mike Flanagan said in November 2023 that had a third installment of his anthology series The Haunting been commissioned, the season would have adapted Hell House; however, the rights were not available.
