= The Young Warriors (film) =

1966 film

- Original film poster
- Directed by: John Peyser
- Written by: Richard Matheson
- Based on: The Beardless Warriors by Richard Matheson
- Produced by: Gordon Kay
- Starring: James Drury; Steve Carlson; Jonathan Daly; Norman Fell
- Cinematography: Loyal Griggs
- Edited by: Russell F. Schoengarth
- Production company: Universal Pictures
- Distributed by: Universal Pictures
- Release dates: April 27, 1967 (Cincinnati, Ohio); February 7, 1968 (United States)
- Running time: 93 minutes
- Country: United States
- Language: English

The Young Warriors is a war film filmed in 1967 by Universal Pictures based on Richard Matheson's 1960 novel The Beardless Warriors. The novel was inspired by Matheson's own experiences as an 18-year-old infantryman with the 87th Infantry Division in Germany in World War II. The film was directed by John Peyser.

It was filmed cheaply by Universal on their backlot using many of its contract players, with Matheson asked to do a rewrite of his screenplay in order to use the battle sequences from Universal's To Hell and Back. The film was released as a double feature with Rosalind Russell's Rosie!

== Plot ==
In Europe, 1944, a group of replacements are assigned to Sgt Cooley's squad and sent into battle. Initially frightened, Hacker grows to love killing but loses that feeling as well. He is promoted to Corporal and later given his own squad as a Sergeant in the end.

== Cast ==
- James Drury as Sergeant Horatio Cooley
- Steve Carlson as Hacker (Hackermeyer in the novel)
- Jonathan Daly as Guthrie
- Robert Pine as Foley
- Jeff Scott as Cpl. Lippincott
- Michael Stanwood as Riley
- John Alladin as Harris
- Hank Jones as Fairchild
- Tom Nolan as Tremont
- Norman Fell as Sergeant Wadley
- Buck Young as Schumacher
- Kent McCord (as Kent McWhirther) as Lieutenant

== Production ==
Matheson recalled that following the release of his novel he had offers from Richard Zanuck (who dropped his plans to film it when his father Darryl F. Zanuck was making The Longest Day) and Fred Zinnemann. Zinnemann told Matheson that he wanted to make the film but had several other projects at the time; Matheson refused to wait and turned him down. The film's working title was The Beardless Warriors, which was the name of the novel the film was based on. When Universal wished to "lighten" Matheson's screenplay, they had Jonathan Daly write a comedy relief scene of chasing a duck through a minefield.

== Reception ==
Howard Thompson of The New York Times gave the film a mixed review, praising Loyal Griggs's cinematography and the "abrupt, almost impersonal authenticity of the skirmishes" as realistic on behalf of director John Peyser, but criticized the plot as unoriginal. Variety similarly praised the technical presentation but criticized the screenplay as being "ridden with Just about every possible cliche and a cast that is collectively damp behind the ears, have proven too great for most of the people concerned."
