= Third from the Sun =

- The Twilight Zone episode
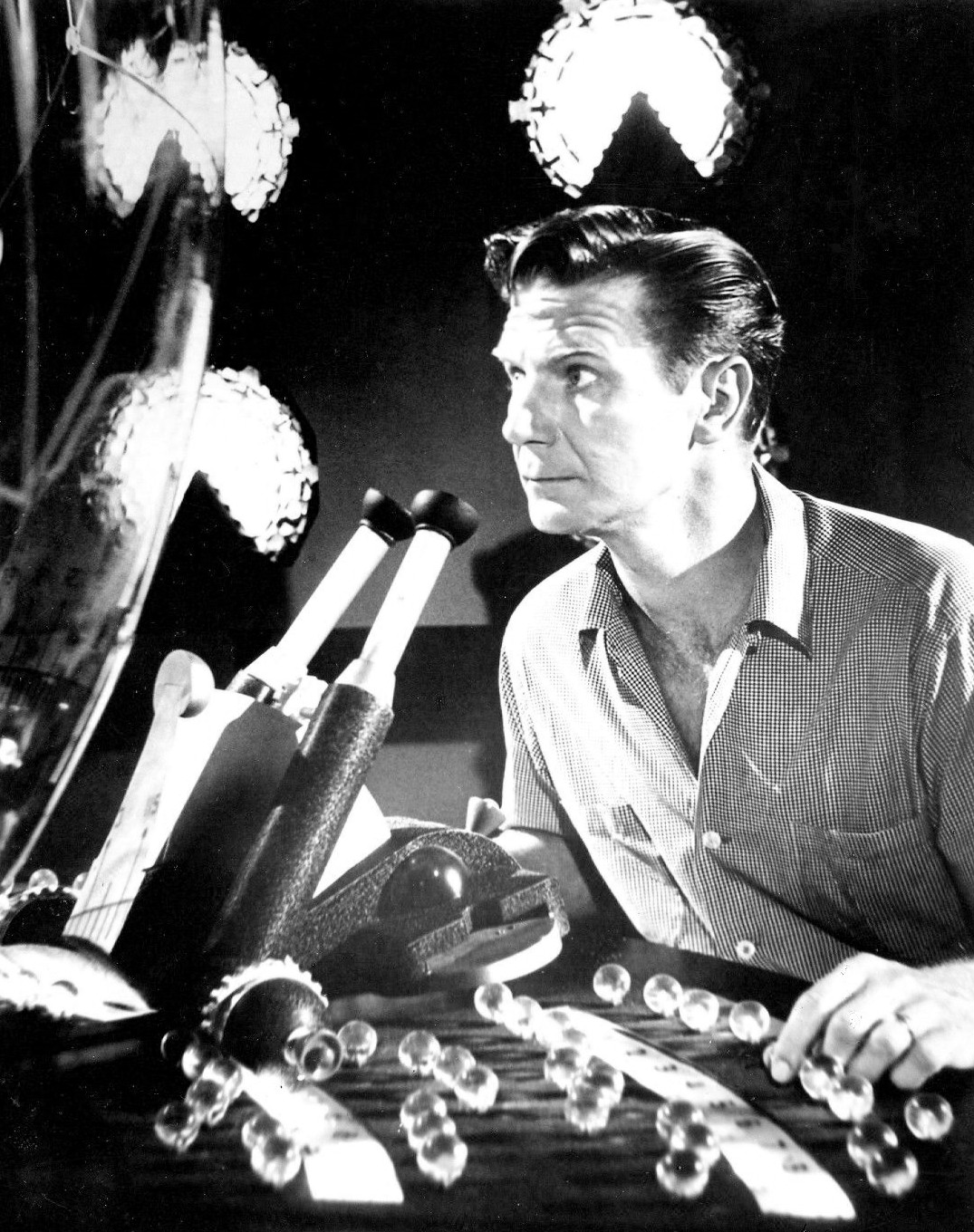
- Joe Maross in "Third from the Sun"
- Episode no.: Season 1 Episode 14
- Directed by: Richard L. Bare
- Teleplay by: Rod Serling
- Based on: "Third from the Sun" by Richard Matheson
- Production code: 173-3615
- Original air date: January 8, 1960

Guest appearances
- Fritz Weaver as Will Sturka; Edward Andrews as Carling; Joe Maross as Jerry Riden; Denise Alexander as Jody Sturka; Lori March as Eve Sturka; Jeanne Evans as Ann Riden

Episode chronology
← Previous "The Four of Us Are Dying"	Next → "I Shot an Arrow into the Air"
- The Twilight Zone (1959 TV series, season 1)

"Third from the Sun" is the fourteenth episode of the American television anthology series The Twilight Zone. It is based on a short story of the same name by Richard Matheson which first appeared in the first issue of the magazine Galaxy Science Fiction in October 1950.

== Opening narration ==
Quitting time at the plant. Time for supper now. Time for families. Time for a cool drink on a porch. Time for the quiet rustle of leaf-laden trees that screen out the Moon. And underneath it all, behind the eyes of the men, hanging invisible over the summer night, is a horror without words. For this is the stillness before storm. This is the eve of the end.

== Plot ==
Will Sturka, a scientist who works at a military base, has been producing a great number of H-bombs alongside other staff members who are manufacturing various devastating weapons in preparation for imminent nuclear war. Sturka realizes that there is only one way to escape—steal an experimental, top-secret spacecraft stored at another base up north. He plans to bring his friend Jerry Riden, who is trained as a pilot of the spacecraft, along with their wives and Sturka's daughter Jody. The two plot for months, secretly supplying the ship and making arrangements for their departure. One afternoon, Sturka engages in conversation with a co-worker, Carling, who gleefully tells him that he's heard a rumor the war will start in 48 hours. When Sturka voices his disgust at the potential holocaust, Carling is dismayed and cautions him, saying Sturka should watch what he says, and what he thinks.

At home, Sturka confides in his family, trying to assuage his guilt over helping to create weapons by rationalizing he's only one part in a much larger machine though he recognizes that he still maintains partial responsibility. His daughter comments that there's a terrible feeling in the air, that something dreadful is coming and that everyone can feel it. Sturka realizes that time is running out.

Sturka and Riden decide to put their plan in action—take their families to the site where the spacecraft is held, getting in with help from their contact working at the site whom Riden has bribed and take off in the ship, leaving the planet for good. Carling, suspicious of Sturka since their chat, eavesdrops on them at Sturka's house and overhears their plan. Later that night, everyone gathers for a game of cards where Riden reveals that while he was test flying the spacecraft, the military had discovered a small planet 11 million miles away with a civilization similar to theirs—the perfect place to escape. During the game, Carling unexpectedly appears at the door and hints that he knows what the group is plotting. He also hints at trouble: "A lot can happen in forty-eight hours." After Carling leaves, Sturka receives a call from his superiors, commanding him to return to the base. He and Riden inform the women that they must leave that very moment.

When the five arrive at the site of the spacecraft, Sturka and Riden spot their contact, who flashes a light. When the contact steps forward, he is revealed to be Carling, armed with a gun. He forces Sturka and Riden away from the gate and prepares to call the authorities. The women, who have been waiting in the car, watch as Carling orders them out. Jody suddenly throws the car's door open, knocking the gun from Carling's hand and giving the men enough time to overpower him and knock him out. The group rushes into the ship, fighting off the pursuing guards.

Much later, the group has safely escaped their doomed planet and are on course. Sturka says it's hard to believe there are people living on the alien world where they're headed. Riden points out on the ship's viewer their mysterious destination, 11 million miles away—the third planet from the Sun, called "Earth".

== Closing narration ==
Behind a tiny ship heading into space is a doomed planet on the verge of suicide. Ahead lies a place called Earth, the third planet from the Sun. And for William Sturka and the men and women with him, it's the eve of the beginning—in the Twilight Zone.

== Reception ==
Emily St. James of The A.V. Club rated it A and called the twist "justifiably famous".

== See also ==
- "Probe 7, Over and Out", another Twilight Zone episode with a similar plot.
- The Forbidden Planet cruiser appeared in a total of 8 Twilight Zone episodes (see linked article for list of episodes).
- The American science-fiction TV series Pluribus, the main character of which is named Carol Sturka, and which has a similar plot of aliens coming to Earth.
- Ancient astronaut theory
