= Beverly Hills Nannies =

American reality television series

- Genre: Reality
- Starring: Amanda Averill; Scott Carmill; Kristin Lancione; Shayla Quinn; Shaun Sturz; Justin Sylvester; Lucy Treadway; Amber Valdez
- Country of origin: United States
- Original language: English
- No. of seasons: 1
- No. of episodes: 10

Production
- Executive producers: Kathleen French; Douglas Ross; Greg Stewart; Alex Baskin
- Producers: Kristin Lancione; Maeve Quinlan
- Production company: Evolution Media

Original release
- Network: Freeform; ABC Spark
- Release: July 11 – September 4, 2012

Beverly Hills Nannies is an American reality television series that aired on ABC Family in the U.S. and ABC Spark in Canada. It debuted on July 11, 2012.

== Nannies ==
- Kristin Lancione (from Fremont, California)
- Justin Allen Sylvester (from Breaux Bridge, Louisiana)
- Lucy Anne Treadway (from Cincinnati, Ohio)
- Amanda Averill (from West Bend, Wisconsin)
- Scott Cartmill (from Maryborough, Queensland)
- Amber Valdez (from Seattle, Washington)
- Shayla Quinn (from Orange County, California)
- Shaun Sturz (from Bakersfield, California)
- Maggie Thorne (from Fremont, California)

== Children/families ==
- The Margolis Family

Nicholas (born in 2002) and twin girls Sabrina and Sierra (born in 2005) are the children of American glamour spokesmodel and actress Cindy Margolis.

- The Tsircou Family

Xander Tsircou (born in 2011) is the son of Kyri and Marika Tsircou. Marika is an artist (abstract oil painter) and stay at home mommy, while Kyri is an IP Patent attorney who has his own firm, Tsircou Law.

- The Thames Family

Wylder Thames (born 2009) is the son of Tricia Leigh Fisher - daughter of Eddie Fisher and Connie Stevens, sister of Joely Fisher and half-sister of Carrie Fisher - and former actor and music producer husband Byron Thames.

- The Bellamar Family

Emma Bellamar (born in 2008) is the daughter of Ariane Bellamarr (former adult film/photo actress Stephanie Dahl) (she died from a heart attack at the age of 46 on 18 February 2025).

- The Faulk Family

Gabrielle (Bella) (born in 1999), Presley (born in 1999), Farrah (born in 2002) and Brooklyn (born in 2007) Faulk are the children of Lindsay Faulk, ex-wife of former NFL running back and Hall of Famer Marshall Faulk.

- The Solomon Family

Sterling (born in 2010) is son of same-sex partners Sherry Solomon and Dana Solomon, owners of high-end LA design company 22 Bond St..

- The Elkins Family

Dane (born in 1999), Cody (born in 2004), Jaden (born in 2001), and Madison (born in 2007) Elkins are the children of Deborah and Brett Elkins.

== Plot ==
The show focuses on a group of young nannies working for upper-class families in some of the world's wealthiest zip codes.

== Episodes ==
| Episode | U.S. Air Date | Rating/Share (18-49) | Viewers (Millions) |
|---|---|---|---|
| "It's the Nanny Life for Me" | July 11, 2012 | 0.6 | 1.15 |
| "Nannenemies" | July 18, 2012 | 0.3 | 0.65 |
| "Nanny-Mama Drama" | July 25, 2012 | 0.3 | 0.67 |
| "Nanny War is Coming" | August 1, 2012 | 0.2 | 0.58 |
| "Nanny vs. Mommy" | August 7, 2012 | 0.3 | 0.75 |
| "Nannies Need Love Too" | August 14, 2012 | 0.4 | 0.77 |
| "Nanny vs. Nanny" | August 21, 2012 | 0.4 | 0.70 |
| "Nanny Nation Divided" | August 28, 2012 | 0.4 | 0.85 |
| "Nanny, Are You OK?" | September 4, 2012 | 0.5 | 0.91 |
| "Nannies Tell All" | September 4, 2012 | 0.2 | 0.91 |
