= Tricia Leigh Fisher =

American actress

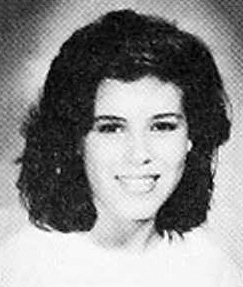
- High school yearbook portrait, 1985
- Born: December 26, 1968 (age 57); Burbank, California, U.S.
- Other name: Tricia Fisher
- Occupations: Actress; singer; host
- Years active: 1985–present
- Spouse: Byron Thames (m. 2007)
- Children: 2
- Parent(s): Eddie Fisher; Connie Stevens
- Relatives: Carrie Fisher (half-sister); Todd Fisher (half-brother); Joely Fisher (sister); Billie Lourd (half-niece)

Tricia Leigh Fisher (born December 26, 1968) is an American actress.

== Early life ==
Fisher was born in Burbank, California to singer Eddie Fisher and actress Connie Stevens. Her older sister is actress and singer Joely Fisher. She has two half-siblings, actor and producer Todd Fisher and actress Carrie Fisher, from her father's previous marriage to actress Debbie Reynolds. Fisher's paternal grandparents were Russian-Jewish immigrants. Her father had married five times, the third time to Stevens. Fisher's parents divorced when she was a baby and she and Joely were raised by Stevens, who never remarried. As children, both Tricia and Joely began performing on stage in their mother's Las Vegas show.

== Career ==
=== Acting ===
At the age of 16, Fisher made her debut in the 1985 crime drama Stick, starring Burt Reynolds, Candice Bergen, George Segal, and Charles Durning. She then starred as Daphne Ziegler in the 1986 comedy Pretty Smart. In 1987, Fisher appeared in the television movie Strange Voices, opposite Valerie Harper. The following year, she landed a role in the TV movie Bring Me the Head of Dobie Gillis, also starring her mother as well as Dwayne Hickman and Bob Denver. In 1989, Fisher appeared in two movies, Hollywood Chaos and C.H.U.D. II: Bud the C.H.U.D., followed by roles in the 1990 comedy, Book of Love and Arizona Dream starring Johnny Depp, Jerry Lewis, and Faye Dunaway.

In addition to Fisher's work in movies, she has also made guest appearances on Our House, Growing Pains, Ellen, Wild Card, 7th Heaven, and 'Til Death. In 1996, she portrayed Heidi Fleiss in the CBS television movie The Making of a Hollywood Madam.

On October 7, 2006, Fisher was honored at The Thalians 51st Anniversary Ball along with producer Marc Cherry, her mother Connie Stevens, and her sister Joely Fisher. They performed together at the event at the Hyatt Regency Century Plaza Hotel in Century City, California.

In September 2011, Fisher and her husband, actor Byron Thames, appeared in her mother's Las Vegas stage show. In July 2012, Fisher, her husband and children began appearing on the ABC Family reality series Beverly Hills Nannies.

=== Music ===
Fisher performed the theme song for her 1986 movie Pretty Smart, and released a self-titled debut album for Atco Records in 1990. The album's single "Empty Beach", written by Dennis East, was a modest hit.

== Filmography ==
Film
Year	Film	Role	Notes
1985	Stick	Katie Stickley	
1987	Pretty Smart	Daphne Ziegler	
1989	Hollywood Chaos	Mary	
1989	C.H.U.D. II: Bud the C.H.U.D.	Katie	
1990	Book of Love	Gina Gabooch	
1993	Arizona Dream	Lindy	Uncredited
1994	I'll Do Anything	Airplane Passenger	
1995	Hostile Intentions	Maureen	Video
1997	Men Seeking Women	Amanda	
2009	Saving Grace B. Jones	Ella Jean Jones	

Television
Year	Film	Role	Notes
1986	One Big Family	Melinda Clarke	Episode: "Image Breaker"
1986	Our House	Bonnie	Episode: "Different Habits"
1986	Bio-Man	Trini Crystal / Biorhythm Yellow	Unaired pilot
1987	Time Out for Dad	Shelley Kowalski	TV movie
1987	Strange Voices	Lisa Glover	TV movie
1988	Bring Me the Head of Dobie Gillis	Chatsie	TV movie
1988	Growing Pains	C.J. Powell	Episode: "Nude Photos"
1996	The Making of a Hollywood Madam	Heidi Fleiss	TV movie
1996	Brotherly Love	Miss Harper	Episode: "Kernel of Truth"
1996	Ellen	Joanie	Episode: "Lobster Diary"
1997	Beyond Belief: Fact or Fiction	Julia Randall	Episode: "The Tractor"
1998	Ellen	Megan	Episode: "Ellen: A Hollywood Tribute: Part 2"
1999	Love, American Style	Amy	Segment: "Love and the Internet"
2001	These Old Broads	Hooker	TV movie
2001	The Huntress	Cashier	Episode: "The Quest: Part 2"
2003	Wild Card	Nicolette	Episode: "Backstabbed"
2004	7th Heaven	Mrs. Shearers	Episode: "Bad Boys, Bad Boys, Whatcha Gonna Do"
2006–2010	'Til Death	Denise	8 episodes
2010	'Til Death	Tricia	Episode: "Work Wife"
2010	No Ordinary Family	Alice Costigan	Episode: "No Ordinary Vigilante"
2011	The Mentalist	Prudence	Episode: "Bloodhounds"
2012	Criminal Minds	Sandra Montgomery	Episode: "I Love You, Tommy Brown"
2013	Rizzoli & Isles	Mrs. Cole	Episode: "All for One"

== Discography ==
=== Albums ===
- 1990: Tricia Leigh Fisher
- 1990: Dreams^{‡}

=== Singles ===
- 1990: "Empty Beach"
- 1990: "Let's Make the Time"
- 1990: "My Heart Holds On"/"Good As Gold"^{‡}

‡ Japan release only
