= List of 'Til Death episodes =

'Til Death is an American sitcom. It aired on Fox from September 7, 2006, to June 20, 2010. A total of 81 episodes of 'Til Death were produced over four seasons.

== Series overview ==
Season	Episodes	Originally released	
Season	Episodes	First released	Last released
1	22	September 7, 2006	April 11, 2007
2	15	September 19, 2007	May 14, 2008
3	7	September 10, 2008	October 8, 2008
4	37	October 2, 2009	June 20, 2010

== Episodes ==
=== Season 1 (2006–07) ===
No. overall	No. in season	Title	Directed by	Written by	Original release date	Prod. code	Viewers (millions)
1	1	"Pilot"	Ted Wass	Josh Goldsmith & Cathy Yuspa	September 7, 2006	100	8.82
Eddie and Joy Stark, who have been married for 8000+ days, are introduced. In contrast, their new next door neighbours, Steph and Jeff Woodcock, are young newlyweds. The young couple ends up having an argument over a pool table which ends up migrating next door.
2	2	"Sex for Furniture"	Ted Wass	Patti Carr & Lara Runnels	September 14, 2006	101	6.55
When the Starks need to replace their old broken-down patio furniture, Steph suggests that Joy try her sure-fire method of getting what she wants: trading sex for shopping.
3	3	"The Ring"	James Widdoes	Josh Goldsmith & Cathy Yuspa	September 21, 2006	103	5.78
Eddie is backed into a corner when Joy reminds him of his promise to buy her a diamond engagement ring 20 years ago.
4	4	"The Wood Pile"	Ted Wass	Alex Barnow & Marc Firek	September 28, 2006	102	5.72
Eddie looks to the newlyweds next door to help him keep his woodpile in the garage when Joy tells him to "use it or lose it".
5	5	"The Garage Band"	Rob Schiller	Alex Barnow & Marc Firek	November 2, 2006	107	4.33
When Jeff starts feeling suffocated by his marriage, Eddie suggests doing what he does: find something he can do without his wife, like his fake garage band. Little does he know that Joy is in on his secret and relishes spending the time alone doing whatever she wants.
6	6	"Your Mother or Your Wife"	James Widdoes	Alan J. Higgins	November 9, 2006	104	4.43
A visit by Jeff's mom exposes Eddie's long-kept secret relationship with his own mother.
7	7	"Dream Getaway" "Dream Weaver"	James Widdoes	Josh Goldsmith & Cathy Yuspa	November 16, 2006	108	4.55
Steph and Jeff convince Eddie and Joy to join them for a getaway in the mountains, but when Steph tells Jeff she had an erotic dream about Eddie, their vacation is anything but relaxing for the Woodcocks.
8	8	"Death Sex"	Ted Wass	DJ Nash	November 30, 2006	105	4.77
When their worries over the fact that he might be dying lead Joy to want to have sex more often, Eddie doesn't want to break the spell after learning that he isn't really sick.
9	9	"The Toaster"	Rob Schiller	Patti Carr & Lara Runnels	December 14, 2006	106	4.61
As Eddie and Joy square off over whether unplugging their toaster will save electricity, Jeff plans to throw a surprise birthday party for Steph.
10	10	"Daddy's Girl"	James Widdoes	Steve Skrovan	December 21, 2006	111	4.94
Eddie and Joy's daughter, Allison, comes home for the holidays to celebrate New Years with her parents. When she gets some bad news from her boyfriend, Allison turns to her mother for help, leaving a snubbed Eddie perplexed. At the Woodcocks' New Year's Eve party, Eddie lightens up his mood to impress his daughter, but as the clock strikes midnight and a new year begins, Allison realizes she likes her "big, dark, angry, wonderful dad" just the way he is.
11	11	"The Anniversary Party"	James Widdoes	Josh Goldsmith & Cathy Yuspa	January 4, 2007	109	5.12
While attending Vicki and Stan's 25th anniversary party, Joy can't help feeling jealous at the attention Stan pays to his wife. Eddie gets advice from Stan about his role in the marriage, while Jeff is forced to admit that is embarrassed by Steph's sexually suggestive dance moves.
12	12	"The Hockey Lie"	Henry Chan	DJ Nash	January 11, 2007	110	4.68
Jeff is heartbroken and angry when Steph reveals that she won't be his Hockey Girl any longer. Eddie later muses that it's normal for new couples to lie and that they will eventually grow apart because of it, but Joy insists that she and Eddie are actually becoming more similar as they grow old together. As Jeff tries to accept that his wife is not the woman he thought she was, Eddie tries to prove to Joy that he is his own man.
13	13	"Fight Friend"	Rob Schiller	Vijal Patel	January 18, 2007	112	5.10
Joy turns to a friend, Nicole for help when she and Eddie are fighting. When Eddie confronts Joy about Nicole, they get into a heated argument and seek support from their respective fight friends Joy teaming up with Nicole, and Eddie with Nicole's husband Cofeld, in order to prove their points.
14	14	"The Colleague"	Rob Schiller	DJ Nash	February 1, 2007	113	5.47
Joy encourages Eddie to become friends with an attractive new female teacher at school, only to discover that she is jealous of the bond formed by their shared passion for history. Meanwhile, Jeff tries to be cool and uses Steph to get in with the cool high school kids.
15	15	"The Bachelor Party"	James Widdoes	Alex Barnow & Marc Firek	February 8, 2007	114	5.03
When the guys discover that Jeff never had a bachelor party, they have a boys' night out at a local club. But when Nicole tags along with Cofeld, the guys' night doesn't turn out as they planned. Meanwhile, Joy is sick at home and Steph comes over with a special recipe to help them both feel better.
16	16	"The Italian Affair"	Rob Schiller	Alan J. Higgins	February 15, 2007	115	5.21
When Joy accuses Eddie of being a pack rat, he and Jeff go through piles of ancient items from Eddie's past. The duo uncovers an old roll of film, which Jeff agrees to get developed. When Eddie sees the photos of himself and Joy having a great time in Italy, he is reminded of how the vacation ended in a moment he and Joy never discuss. In order to make things right, Eddie does all he can to relive their trip to Italy right there in the suburbs of Philadelphia. Ray Romano makes a guest appearance as a client in the restaurant.
17	17	"Clay Date"	James Widdoes	Patricia Carr & Lara Olsen	March 14, 2007	116	14.07
When Eddie and Joy visit Allison for parent's weekend, they share a dorm room with a partying single father (Dan Butler). When Allison lets them know her new major and next semester's plans, Eddie and Joy try their best to convince her to do otherwise but realize that their own mistakes led them to where they are today. Meanwhile, Jeff hires someone to help Steph tile the bathroom, which brings out the worst in her.
18	18	"I Heart Woodcocks"	Rob Schiller	Alex Barnow & Marc Firek	March 21, 2007	118	14.88
When the Woodcocks strike up a close friendship with the Cofelds, the Starks begin to feel left out. Much to their surprise, they find they really miss their time with Jeff and Steph. Eddie and Joy set out to win the Woodcocks friendship back.
19	19	"The Coffee Maker"	James Widdoes	Josh Goldsmith & Cathy Yuspa	March 28, 2007	119	14.46
Steph gives Eddie and Joy a cappuccino maker that was a wedding gift from Jeff's mom. Joy loves the gift, but Eddie soon begins to resent Joy for not learning how to work the machine herself. When Eddie refuses to make Joy her nightly cappuccino, she makes a list of all the things she does around the house and comes to the conclusion that Eddie doesn't do enough. Meanwhile Jeff is mad at Steph for giving away a present from his mom, and he tries to come up with a plan to get back at her.
20	20	"That's Ridiculous"	James Widdoes	Vijal Patel	April 4, 2007	117	13.95
When Joy and Allison meet for Spring Break in Florida, Eddie is thrilled to have the house to himself where he can eat, sleep, wear whatever he wants and hang out with Cofeld. But when the week doesn't go exactly as planned, Eddie realizes how much he misses Joy. Meanwhile, Joy and Allison aren't missing Eddie too much as they work-it on the beach.
21	21	"Webbie's Not Happy"	James Widdoes	Patricia Carr & Lara Olsen	April 11, 2007	120	7.05
When one of Eddie's single idols comes for a visit, Eddie is in awe, while Joy is unimpressed by Webbie's (Ted McGinley) lifestyle of wild adventures and exotic travels. To Joy, Webbie is running away from the one thing that can make him truly happy: a committed relationship.
22	22	"Summer of Love"	James Widdoes	Story by : Josh Goldsmith & Cathy Yuspa; Teleplay by : Alex Barnow & Marc Firek	April 11, 2007	121	8.64
Summer vacation has begun and Allison surprises her parents when she brings her laid back boyfriend, Doug, home. When Allison and Doug spend their days enjoying the summer, Steph gets Eddie to join them. Jeff and Joy feel left out and annoyed by their partners' happiness but finally are persuaded to join in.

=== Season 2 (2007–08) ===
No. overall	No. in season	Title	Directed by	Written by	Original release date	Prod. code	Viewers (millions)
23	1	"Performance Anxiety"	James Widdoes	Ilana Wernick	September 19, 2007	201	7.76
As a birthday gift reveals just how little confidence Jeff has in Steph being able to complete her master's thesis, Eddie confesses that he has always found Joy's singing to be over the top. At Steph's birthday party, Joy sings so loudly, that the strong force of her vibrato blows out all the candles.
24	2	"Four Neighbors and a Funeral"	James Widdoes	Ilana Wernick	September 26, 2007	203	6.20
Eddie and Joy feel left out when they are the only neighbors not included in an elderly neighbor's funeral. After Joy is asked to sing, Eddie, feeling jealous, tries to find something for him to do also. Steph and Jeff disagree about the eulogy Steph is planning to give.
25	3	"Come Out and Play"	James Widdoes	Alex Barnow & Marc Firek	October 3, 2007	202	6.19
While Jeff looks to save face by entering a team in a faculty league basketball game, Eddie worries that his false claims of being a basketball star are about to be exposed.
26	4	"Tale of the Tape"	James Widdoes	Nick Bakay & DJ Nash	October 10, 2007	206	6.49
Steph decides that she wants to watch an adult video with Jeff, who has never seen one, so he asks his colleagues at school for advice. That's how Eddie gets into trouble with Joy, who is in no mood for nonsense following a disastrous visit to the gym.
27	5	"Mixed Doubles"	James Widdoes	Alex Barnow & Marc Firek	October 17, 2007	207	7.01
When Steph introduces Eddie to yoga and Jeff turns Joy on to tennis, the couples spend more and more time with their friends and less time with each other. The swap seems successful until Jeff's competitive streak emerges and Joy tries to bow out of tennis lessons.
28	6	"Vintage Eddie"	James Widdoes	Alex Barnow & Marc Firek	November 7, 2007	209	6.51
Eddie offends Jeff at his birthday dinner when he forgets to give him a gift. Eddie recovers by re-gifting Joy's expensive wine and then is forced to try to get it back.
29	7	"Bedtime Stories"	James Widdoes	Josh Goldsmith & Cathy Yuspa	November 14, 2007	208	7.34
When Joy purchases two new bedroom lamps, one lamp works and the other one is broken, prompting Eddie and Joy to fight over the working lamp. Meanwhile, Jeff fights for the right to go to bed whenever he wants.
30	8	"No More Mr. Vice Guy"	Gary Halvorson	Steve Skrovan	November 28, 2007	205	5.74
When Jeff becomes acting principal at the school, he thinks his ship has finally come in and this is his chance to shine. However, when he has to make an important decision, he chokes and winds up suspending Eddie.
31	9	"Everybody Digs Doug"	Rob Schiller	Vijal Patel	November 28, 2007	204	6.22
After getting suspended from his teaching job, Eddie finds himself bored at home until he gets an unexpected visit from his daughter and her boyfriend. Meanwhile, Joy is annoyed by Steph, who has developed an attitude from her husband's elevated status at the school.
32	10	"Really Big Brother"	James Widdoes	Tim Hobert	March 25, 2008	213	10.00
To avoid doing housework with Joy, Eddie signs up to be a volunteer for a "Big Brother" program but things go awry when he's accidentally given an adult instead of a kid to mentor.
33	11	"A Raisinette in the Sun"	James Widdoes	DJ Nash	April 16, 2008	215	5.89
When Kenny is subjected to a perceived racist slight at a local movie theater, he reacts strongly causing Eddie to rush to his defense. In the aftermath, Eddie decides that Kenny overreacted and resolves to prove it to him.
34	12	"Snip/Duck"	Rob Schiller	Nick Bakay & DJ Nash	April 23, 2008	214	6.12
When Joy and Eddie have a pregnancy scare, Joy convinces Eddie to get a vasectomy. Nervous about the procedure, Eddie takes advice from Kenny and pretends that he wants more children in order to avoid the trip to Dr. Park.
35	13	"Sob Story"	Rob Schiller	Story by : Tim Hobert; Teleplay by : Ilana Wernick	April 30, 2008	216	5.57
When Joy gets frustrated with Eddie's inability to show emotion, Kenny and Jeff unsuccessfully try to get him to turn on the water works. As a last resort, Joy and Eddie attend an "intimacy workshop" for couples led by the "living, loving and sharing" Dr. Friedman. But when the workshop takes a strange turn, Joy starts to see Eddie's lack of sensitivity as a flaw she can appreciate
36	14	"Second Marriage Guy"	James Widdoes	Ilana Wernick	May 7, 2008	210	6.03
When Eddie's friend Karl introduces him to his second wife, Eddie becomes jealous of Karl's relaxed marriage and convinces Joy that they should try out a "second marriage." Joy has her own ideas of how a "second marriage" should be causing Eddie to re-think his suggestion.
37	15	"Swimming with Starks"	Rob Schiller	Ilana Wernick	May 14, 2008	217	5.90
When Joy calls off their usual anniversary celebration and surprises Eddie with a gift, he decides to one-up her with a special snorkeling trip to Hawaii requiring him to take swimming lessons from Kenny.

=== Season 3 (2008) ===
No. overall	No. in season	Title	Directed by	Written by	Original release date	Prod. code	Viewers (millions)
38	1	"Speed Bumps"	Josh Goldsmith	Tim Hobert	September 10, 2008	302	6.06
When Joy can't flirt her way out of her first speeding ticket, she considers buying new lingerie and getting plastic surgery to help her get her "groove" back. Meanwhile, Kenny and Tina continue to fight over custody of their beloved dog, Beyonce.
39	2	"Joy Ride"	Josh Goldsmith	Vijal Patel	September 17, 2008	219	4.89
When Eddie takes his car into the shop, he decides it's time for a new set of wheels and purchases a red convertible sports car. Joy recognizes that Eddie's passion for his new car is part of his mid-life crisis, so in a play for his attention she flirts with her co-worker. Meanwhile, Kenny buys Eddie's old clunker and tricks it.
40	3	"Dreamguys"	Gil Junger	Ilana Wernick	September 24, 2008	304	3.72
When Kenny becomes Joy's new "girlfriend," Eddie feels left out and gets jealous of their girl-talk. In an attempt to feel included, Eddie crashes Joy's 1970s-themed work party and sends Joy to the hospital in a disco mishap.
41	4	"Sugar Dougie"	James Widdoes	Vijal Patel	October 1, 2008	305	4.24
Eddie and Joy's daughter, Allison, comes home from college for a visit. She and her hippie boyfriend argue and decide to break up, which is fine with Eddie until he finds out Doug is from a very wealthy family. Eddie and Joy then try to get the two back together by inviting Doug over to an organic dinner feast. Meanwhile, Kenny tries to get them back together so he can get his bedroom back.
42	5	"Philadelphia Freedom"	Rob Schiller	Josh Goldsmith & Cathy Yuspa	October 1, 2008	211	3.61
When Eddie and Joy spend a romantic night out in the city, Joy becomes enamored with city life and decides they should move downtown. Eddie tries to convince her to keep their house in the suburbs, but a visit to a new downtown loft development tempts him with fancy modern conveniences and causes him to reconsider his decision.
43	6	"Circumdecision"	James Widdoes	DJ Nash & Royale Watkins	October 8, 2008	303	4.61
Kenny freaks out after losing his swim trunks at a water park and his new girlfriend notices he isn't circumcised. When he decides to go under the knife, Joy is impressed by his efforts to please a girl he hardly knows and badgers Eddie to do more nice things for her. Eddie tries to get Kenny to back out of his decision so he won't have to accompany Joy to six weeks of musicals in the park and takes him to a bris so he can see what circumcision looks like.
44	7	"Secret Meatball"	James Widdoes	Josh Goldsmith & Cathy Yuspa	October 8, 2008	218	3.81
Joy discovers that Eddie has been hiding his favorite meatball-sandwich shop from her. This helps her come to the realization that they can't keep secrets from each other anymore because they've been married so long and seem to know everything about each other.

=== Season 4 (2009–10) ===
No. overall	No. in season	Title	Directed by	Written by	Original release date	Prod. code	Viewers (millions)
45	1	"Doug and Ally Return"	Rob Schiller	Dean Lorey	October 2, 2009	402	2.24
Eddie and Joy's free-spirited daughter, Ally, returns from a trek in the Ecuadorian rainforest with her new husband, Doug. When Ally and Doug decide to set up camp in a trailer in the Starks' backyard, they ultimately ruin Eddie's plans for installing a Jacuzzi. Meanwhile, Eddie and Joy attempt to overcome their dislike of Doug and accept him as a member of the family.
46	2	"Separate Beds"	Rob Schiller	Don Reo	October 9, 2009	401	2.30
Joy and Eddie decide to get separate beds after years of putting up with each other's sleep habits. Meanwhile Eddie's new principal turns out to be a former student with an agenda.
47	3	"Eddie's Book"	Rob Schiller	Kevin Rooney	October 23, 2009	404	1.91
When Doug's father gives him and Ally a large sum of money, they struggle with the decision to keep it or give it back. Meanwhile, Eddie decides to write a book about the Hindenburg disaster.
48	4	"No Complaints"	Rob Schiller	Frank Sebastiano	December 25, 2009	314	2.46
When Eddie and Joy try to live without complaining, Eddie finds that repressing his true feelings makes him sick. Meanwhile, Kenny creates problems for parents when he works as a mall Santa.
49	5	"The Courtship of Eddie's Parents"	Rob Schiller	Rodney Barnes	December 25, 2009	212	2.39
Eddie and Joy go to Florida to visit his parents for the holiday, only to find there's trouble in paradise when his parents announce that they're splitting up in order to qualify for health insurance. Eddie refuses to accept the divorce and tries to convince his mother that it isn't a good idea.
50	6	"The Ex-Factor"	Rob Schiller	J.J. Wall	December 25, 2009	306	2.44
Joy's new friend Eileen has had a past romance with Eddie. Meanwhile, Kenny thinks he's doing a nice thing for his new girlfriend by babysitting her kids, little does he know that his new girlfriend may be using him.
51	7	"The Buffer"	Rob Schiller	J.J. Wall	December 25, 2009	301	2.74
After Kenny gets kicked out of his apartment by his ex-wife, Tina, Eddie invites him to stay with him and Joy at their house. When Eddie realizes that Joy is a lot nicer when Kenny is around, he tries to get him to stay with them longer, but Kenny's annoying habits have Joy trying desperately to re-connect him and his ex-wife.
52	8	"Joy's Out of Work"	Rob Schiller	Alyson Fouse	January 31, 2010	403	2.09
When Joy loses her job at the travel agency, she must use her breast assets to find work elsewhere. Meanwhile, Eddie takes Doug to his favorite restaurant.
53	9	"Hi Def TV"	Rob Schiller	Janis Hirsch	January 31, 2010	405	2.43
When Eddie buys a high-definition television without checking with Joy first, she decides to join in the spending spree. Meanwhile, Doug suspects he is living on a sitcom.
54	10	"The Not-So-Perfect Couple"	Rob Schiller	Ron Zimmerman	February 7, 2010	315	1.58
When Joy urges Eddie to get a check-up from their doctor, Simona, Eddie becomes enamored with her, her husband and their seemingly perfect life. Joy becomes annoyed when Eddie takes Simona's advice, even though Joy has been nagging him for years, and decides to prove that Simona isn't as perfect as she seems.
55	11	"Independent Action"	Joely Fisher	Kevin Rooney	February 7, 2010	406	1.85
When Eddie attends their annual baseball game without Joy, they realize that they can have separate lives, but at what cost? Meanwhile, Ally and Doug try to save a tree but end up causing a neighborhood tree-disease epidemic.
56	12	"Snore Loser"	Rob Schiller	Alyson Fouse	February 14, 2010	307	N/A
After Eddie gets treatment for his sleep apnea and stops snoring, Joy realizes that she relied on his nighttime annoyance to help her get to sleep.
57	13	"The Break-Up"	Rob Schiller	Don Reo	February 14, 2010	407	N/A
When Joy and Eddie's friends have a fight and break up, Eddie and Joy step in to try and restore the peace, but it ends up backfiring on them. Meanwhile, Ally sends Doug to a shrink to cure his curious illness.
58	14	"The Perfect Couple"	Rob Schiller	Janis Hirsch	February 21, 2010	308	3.36
When Eddie and Joy befriend Stephen and his wife Simona, Eddie clicks with them right away causing Joy to feel left out. In an effort to win Joy over, Eddie coaches their new friends on her all her likes and dislikes. Meanwhile, Kenny starts a new job as a supermarket sample salesman only to realize that sample distribution can be a competitive biz.
59	15	"The Check-Up"	Rob Schiller	Frank Sebastiano	February 21, 2010	408	2.92
When Joy convinces Eddie to visit Simona for an annual check-up, he catches a nasty head cold before his big interview with a Hindenburg blimp survivor. Meanwhile, Joy can't understand why Simona won't pay her a compliment.
60	16	"Can't Elope"	Rob Schiller	Kevin Rooney	February 28, 2010	313	2.47
When Joy goes overboard planning Ally and Doug's wedding, Eddie convinces them to elope, and Kenny agrees to marry the young couple on top of Eagle Rock. After Joy finds out about their plans, she convinces Eddie to help her stop the wedding.
61	17	"Check Mate"	Madeline Cripe	Rodney Barnes	February 28, 2010	409	3.04
When the Starks meet Simona and Stephen for dinner, they decide to ditch them with the bill resulting in an all-out dining war between the couples. Meanwhile, Joy makes Eddie's life miserable at work.
62	18	"The Concert"	Rob Schiller	Dean Lorey	March 7, 2010	410	2.33
When Eddie befriends a new teacher at school, they find they have a lot in common, but Ms. Duffy has other plans for their relationship. Meanwhile, Eddie and Joy reminisce about the music they loved in the 1980s.
63	19	"Merit Pay"	Joely Fisher	Janis Hirsch	March 7, 2010	411	2.77
Eddie attempts to get a raise in order to take Joy on a vacation, but Principal Duffy steps in to make sure Eddie does not get his raise. Doug's delusion continues to worsen as Lindsey Broad is replaced with Kate Micucci as Allison Stark starting with this episode.
64	20	"The New Neighbors"	Rusty Colemon	Frank Sebastiano	March 14, 2010	412	2.01
When Joy and Eddie meet their rather unconventional new neighbors, Tommy and April Campbell, Eddie can't seem to get the idea of being with a younger woman out of his head. Meanwhile, Eddie and Joy hold a yard sale, and the new neighbors want to buy everything they're selling.
65	21	"The Wedding"	Rob Schiller	Dean Lorey	March 14, 2010	413	1.98
It's the night before Ally and Doug's big day, and everyone is nervous about what tomorrow will bring. Consequentially, everyone dreams up a different wedding disaster.
66	22	"Ally Abroad"	Rob Schiller	Clay Lapari & Charlie Hornsby	March 21, 2010	309	2.52
When Allison's boyfriend Doug is hospitalized, she rushes to his bedside only to be surprised with a proposal. No one is more surprised by their daughter's engagement than Eddie and Joy who plot to put the brakes on wedding planning. Meanwhile, Kenny tries to get Eddie's car repaired without success.
67	23	"Joy's Mom"	James Widdoes	Ilana Wernick	March 21, 2010	414	3.27
When Joy's mother pays her daughter a visit, she drives Joy up the wall with her constant criticism, and Eddie makes a valiant attempt to ease the tension. Meanwhile, Eddie meets with a publisher who wants to turn Eddie's manuscript into a children's picture book.
68	24	"Dog Fight"	Rob Schiller	Steve Skrovan	March 28, 2010	311	2.19
When Joy and Eddie experiment with role-playing to spice up their love life, they realize that pretending to be someone else isn't as sexy as being themselves. Meanwhile, to supplement his income, Kenny tries finding lost dogs to collect the reward money.
69	25	"Sell the House"	James Widdoes	David S. Rosenthal	March 28, 2010	415	2.72
Eddie and Joy want to downgrade to a smaller house, but Doug and Ally aren't ready to move out on their own. Meanwhile, when Duffy dumps Whitey, he moves in with Eddie and Joy as a way of coping, but he quickly overstays his welcome and Joy wants him out.
70	26	"Family Vacation"	Ken Whittingham	Steve Skrovan	April 4, 2010	310	1.53
Eddie and Joy make the wrong impression on a newlywed couple while on vacation and Joy goes out of her way to try to convince the young bride that wedded life is bliss and not how they made it seem. Meanwhile, Kenny and Doug start spending time together, and Allison becomes jealous of their new friendship.
71	27	"Ally's Pregnant"	Rob Schiller	Frank Sebastiano	April 4, 2010	416	1.84
When Ally and Doug announce that they're going to be parents, Joy has a meltdown about becoming a grandmother, forcing Eddie to call in his mother-in-law for help.
72	28	"Smart Phone"	Jason Alexander	Alex Barnow & Marc Firek	April 11, 2010	417	1.93
Eddie becomes annoyed by his students' use of cell phones in class, and soon learns that he and Joy are the only ones not infatuated with the latest technology. When Mr. White decides to drag Eddie into the 21st century, Eddie develops a technology addiction of his own.
73	29	"Big Man, Little Man"	James Widdoes	Ilana Wernick	April 18, 2010	418	1.76
Eddie feels self-conscious when Tommy and Mr. White boast about their endowments, so Joy does her best to convince him that being average is just fine. Meanwhile, Doug and Ally have their first sonogram, and it appears that their unborn son doesn't take after Eddie.
74	30	"Brother's Keeper"	James Widdoes	Alex Barnow & Marc Firek	April 25, 2010	312	2.24
With Eddie's brother, Charlie, and his new boyfriend, Terence, coming to visit, Eddie isn't exactly looking forward to a weekend of wine-tasting and antiquing. Much to Eddie's surprise, though, he hits it off with Terence as they both opt to watch football over participating in the planned weekend activities. When Charlie breaks up with Terence, Joy sides with Charlie and ends up questioning her relationship with Eddie.
75	31	"Work Wife"	James Widdoes	David S. Rosenthal	May 2, 2010	419	1.96
When Joy loses her job at Eddie's school, she accepts a position as Stephen's executive assistant. The new gig leaves her miserable, leading Eddie and Mr. White to scheme a way to get Joy her old job back.
76	32	"Baby Steps"	James Widdoes	David S. Rosenthal	May 9, 2010	420	1.81
Joy goes overboard planning for Ally's baby shower and becomes obsessed with baby gifts. Meanwhile, Mr. White has difficulty giving Ally and Doug their shower gift, and Dr. Bialik invites her "Blossom" castmates to participate in a therapy session for Doug.
77	33	"Let's Go"	James Widdoes	Alex Barnow & Marc Firek	May 16, 2010	421	2.32
When Whitey decides to throw a surprise party for his 93-year-old grumpy uncle, his party guests are surprised to discover that Whitey is a hoarder and his house is overflowing with junk. Meanwhile, Eddie is in a rush to get to the party but Joy, Doug and Ally all take their time getting ready to go.
78	34	"The Baby"	James Widdoes	DJ Nash & Vijal Patel	May 23, 2010	422	2.16
Eddie's book finally gets published, but on the day of his book signing, Ally goes into labor and everyone shows up to welcome the new addition to the family. Meanwhile, Eddie gives Doug fatherhood tips, and Ally apologizes to Joy for being a terrible daughter.
79	35	"The Joy of Learning"	James Widdoes	Ilana Wernick	June 6, 2010	316	2.17
Joy feels inferior for not finishing college, so she decides to hit the books and earn her degree. Although she passes her classes, Eddie isn't satisfied with her grades, and he decides to take matters into his own hands, which leads to Joy getting kicked out of school.
80	36	"Coupon Bob"	James Widdoes	Story by : Angela Nissel; Teleplay by : DJ Nash	June 13, 2010	317	2.07
When Joy gets angry at Eddie for forgetting her birthday, she decides to cash in on all the coupons he has given her over the years for massages, pedicures and chores. Meanwhile, Kenny convinces Eddie that he needs to surprise her with a handbag in order to be forgiven. Unfortunately for Eddie, Joy decides to return the handbag and finds out the hard way that it's a fake.
81	37	"Cold Case"	James Widdoes	Charles Hornsby	June 20, 2010	318	1.53
Joy thinks Eddie is keeping secrets and decides to launch an investigation; Eddie asks Karl and Kenny for advice.
