= Julyana Soelistyo =

American stage and film actress (born c. 1971)

- Born: c. 1971; Sumatra, Indonesia
- Other name: Julyana Barrett
- Occupation: Actress
- Years active: 1998–Present
- Spouse: Tim Barrett

Julyana Soelistyo is an American stage and film actress who, in 1998, was nominated for a Tony Award for Best Featured Actress in a Play for her performance in Golden Child.

== Early life ==
Julyana Soelistyo was born to Roman Catholic parents in Sumatra, Indonesia. She attended school in Penang, Malaysia, taking lessons in piano and violin. Later, she attended Oregon State University, where she appeared in productions of The Tempest (as Ariel), Les Liaisons Charmantes, The Misanthrope and Piaf. After Soelistyo graduated in 2002, she attended San Francisco's American Conservatory Theater to earn her MFA. During 1995–1997, Soelistyo played the title characters, all of which were children, in the Seattle Children's Theatre plays Naomi's Road, Alice's Adventures in Wonderland, and Still Life with Iris.

== Career ==
Soelistyo met David Henry Hwang at the debut reading of Golden Child in California, after being recommended by Hwang's friend Judy Nihei. She was tapped to originate the role of Eng Ahn, the title character; in the play, Soelistyo portrayed both the 10-year-old and the 80-year-old Ahn. Golden Child, which premiered at the Off-Broadway Joseph Papp Public Theater, was reworked and moved to Broadway's Longacre Theatre, where Soelistyo continued in her role. She received largely positive reviews. The New York Times's Vincent Canby described her performance as "magical", and the Seattle Post-Intelligencer deemed her an "outstanding female newcomer". Soelistyo won a Clarence Derwent Award and was nominated for a Tony Award, but lost to Anna Manahan.

She has also appeared in the Yale Repertory Theatre's performance of Iphigenia at Aulis, as Cordelia and the Fool in the 1998 New Jersey Shakespeare Festival's performance of King Lear, Imogen in Cymbeline at the Intiman Theatre in Seattle, Dorie in the world premiere of On the Jump, and the Daughter of Antiochus/ Marina in the Brooklyn Academy of Music's Pericles.

Soelistyo has appeared in the films Earthly Possessions and Martin Scorsese's Bringing Out the Dead. Steven Spielberg offered her the role of Pumpkin in Memoirs of a Geisha, and Soelistyo was cast, but the part ultimately went to Youki Kudoh.

In 2010, she appeared in The Tempest in a production at the Stratford Festival, again as Ariel, opposite Christopher Plummer. The production was filmed in 2010 and had its Canadian and US theatrical release in 2012.

== Personal ==
She is married to Tim Barrett, a former Oregon State pre-med student whom she met when he worked on stage lighting for the university's theatre program.
