= Whittni Wright =

American actress

- Born: May 14, 1987 (age 39); Augusta, Georgia, U.S.
- Occupation: Actress

Whittni C. Wright (born May 14, 1987) is an American former child actress.

Wright made her movie debut in 1994's I'll Do Anything as the bratty daughter of actor Nick Nolte. She was nominated for the Best Performance by an Actress Under Ten in a Motion Picture at the 16th Youth In Film Awards. In 1995, Wright played the daughter of Jean-Claude Van Damme's character in the movie Sudden Death.

== Appearances ==
Year	Title	Role	Notes
1994	I'll Do Anything	Jeannie Hobbs	
1995	Sudden Death	Emily McCord	
2006	Sisters		
2008	Fragments		
