= I'll Do Anything =

1994 film by James L. Brooks

- Theatrical release poster
- Directed by: James L. Brooks
- Written by: James L. Brooks
- Produced by: James L. Brooks; Polly Platt
- Starring: Nick Nolte; Albert Brooks; Julie Kavner; Joely Richardson; Tracey Ullman; Whittni Wright
- Cinematography: Michael Ballhaus
- Edited by: Richard Marks
- Music by: Hans Zimmer
- Production company: Gracie Films
- Distributed by: Columbia Pictures
- Release date: February 4, 1994
- Running time: 115 minutes
- Country: United States
- Language: English
- Budget: $40 million
- Box office: $10 million

I'll Do Anything is a 1994 American comedy-drama film written and directed by James L. Brooks. While a large part of the film is a satire of the film industry, it also skewers relationships from various angles. Its primary plot concerns a down-on-his-luck actor who suddenly finds himself the sole caretaker of his six-year-old daughter. The film starred Nick Nolte and Whittni Wright in her film debut, with supporting roles filled by Albert Brooks, Julie Kavner, Joely Richardson and Tracey Ullman. I'll Do Anything was released by Columbia Pictures on February 4, 1994. The film received mixed to positive reviews from critics but was a box office bomb as it grossed $10 million against a $40 million budget.

== Plot ==
In 1980, on the night he fails to win an Emmy Award, Matt Hobbs proposes to his longtime girlfriend Beth. He says the only thing holding him back is his dedication to his career, one which may not always work out, and Beth says that's one of the things she loves most about him. Seven years later, with a baby crying and no job for Matt, Beth is overflowing with resentment. By 1993, the pair have been divorced for several years and are living on opposite coasts.

Matt auditions for a role in pompous, self-absorbed, and clueless film producer Burke Adler's new project but fails to get the part. He does however agree to chauffeur Adler occasionally. Matt flies to Georgia to pick up his daughter Jeannie for what he believes is a brief visit and discovers Beth is facing a prison term and Jeannie will be living with him for the duration of her sentence. The two return to Hollywood and struggle with their new circumstances and building a relationship (Matt hasn't seen the six-year-old since she was four).

When Matt goes in to make a screen test for a lead in a film, he leaves Jeannie with a friend at the studio, and when he picks her up he's stunned to learn she's been cast in a sitcom. Her newfound success contrasts with Matt's ongoing struggles in the industry.

As Jeannie's acting career begins to take off, Matt continues to pursue his own opportunities while grappling with the responsibilities of being a single parent. He also becomes romantically involved with Cathy Breslow, a script reader who works for Adler. Matt starts to come to terms with his own shortcomings as both an actor and a father, realizing that his daughter's success and happiness are becoming more important to him than his own career.

Throughout this time, Matt also navigates his complicated professional relationship with Burke, while Jeannie's success forces him to rethink what truly matters in his life. As Matt grows closer to his daughter, he finds a new sense of purpose and fulfillment in their relationship, even as his acting career remains uncertain.

== Cast ==
- Nick Nolte as Matt Hobbs
- Whittni Wright as Jeannie Hobbs
- Albert Brooks as Burke Adler
- Julie Kavner as Nan Mulhanney
- Joely Richardson as Cathy Breslow
- Tracey Ullman as Beth Hobbs
- Chelsea Field as Screen-Test Actress
- Joely Fisher as Female D Person
- Vicki Lewis as Millie
- Anne Heche as Claire
- Ian McKellen as John Earl McAlpine
- Angela Alvarado as Lucy
- Joel Thurm as Martin
- Dominik Lukas-Espeleta as Ricky
- Justina Hardesty as Essa
- Robert Joy as U.S. Marshal
- Maria Pitillo as Flight Attendant
- Suzzanne Douglas as Rainbow House Star
- Joseph Malone as Assistant Director
- Jake Busey as Burke's Fired Driver
- Harry Shearer as Audience Research Captain
- Rosie O'Donnell as Make-Up Person
- Ken Page as Hair Person
- Perry Anzilotti as Rainbow House Supporting Actor
- Wren T. Brown as Floor Manager
- Arvie Lowe Jr. as Rainbow House Child
- Mayah McCoy as Rainbow House Child
- Heather DeLoach as Rainbow House Child
- Steve Vinovich as Rainbow House Director
- Andy Milder as Warm-Up Man
- Ron Perkins as Victor
- Aaron Lustig as Jack
- Elisabeth Boyd as Elisabeth
- Kate McNeil as Stacy
- Patrick Cassidy as Ground Zero Villain
- Woody Harrelson as Ground Zero Hero
- Tricia Leigh Fisher as Airplane Passenger

== Production ==
Originally I'll Do Anything was conceived and filmed by James L. Brooks as an old-fashioned movie musical and parody of "Hollywood lifestyles and movie clichés", costing $40 million. It featured songs by Carole King, Prince, and Sinéad O'Connor, among others, with choreography by Twyla Tharp. When preview audience reactions to the music were overwhelmingly negative, all production numbers from the film were cut and Brooks wrote several new scenes, filming them over three days and spent seven weeks editing the film. Brooks noted: "Something like this not only tries one's soul - it threatens one's soul." He later said of the film,

I conceived the story as a musical because musicals have a heightened sense of reality. Through song you can get closer to the truth. But even before I had any music I believed I had a complete script. I wrote it like any script. As far as the music was concerned, I only knew where I wanted the songs to go. [...] The point is that with or without musical numbers, the story worked.

== Reception ==
I'll Do Anything received mixed to positive reviews from critics. It currently holds a rating of 67% on Rotten Tomatoes based on 18 reviews.

In his three-star review in the Chicago Sun-Times, Roger Ebert called it "one of those offcenter comedies that gets its best moments simply by looking at people and seeing how funny, how pathetic, how wonderful they sometimes can be . . . it's a bright, edgy, funny story about people who have all the talent they need, but not all the luck . . . It is helpful, I think, to simply forget about the missing songs, and recognize that I'll Do Anything is a complete movie without them - smart, original, subversive." Janet Maslin of The New York Times described it as "droll" and "improbably buoyant."

Audiences surveyed by CinemaScore gave the film a grade "B−" on scale of A to F.

=== Box office ===
The film was a box office failure. Produced on a budget of $40 million, I'll Do Anything grossed only a little over $10.4 million, making it one of the worst performing films of the year when compared to its cost.

== Year-end lists ==
- Top 10 runner-ups (not ranked) – Janet Maslin, The New York Times
- Honorable mention – Jeff Simon, The Buffalo News
- 7th worsts – Glenn Lovell, San Jose Mercury News

== Music ==
One of the original songs meant to be performed in the film is heard during the closing credits and is included on the soundtrack album released by Varèse Sarabande, along with four instrumental tracks by the film's composer, Hans Zimmer. While other versions of songs penned by Prince resurfaced on some of his later projects, Girl 6 and The Vault: Old Friends 4 Sale, none of the actual performances from the movie were ever officially released.

Although James L. Brooks has mentioned he would like to release a director's cut restoring the musical numbers and including a making-of documentary, that project has yet to come to fruition. The film's commercially released version is available on DVD.

In a 2013 interview, Zimmer said that a release of the musical version is unlikely: "The deal structure on those songs was so complicated and so expensive, and it would cost so much money in rights to put it out.”

In an interview on Off Camera with Sam Jones, Jackson Browne stated that his song "I'll Do Anything", released on the 1993 album I'm Alive was originally written to be the title song for the movie. It was to be a comedic song sung by Albert Brooks where he is begging a test audience to favorably review his latest film.

== Bootleg of "Musical Cut" ==
A bootleg recording of the original cut of the film with the musical numbers intact is known to exist. In April 2018, this version was watched and reviewed by the podcast Blank Check with Griffin & David. In August 2020, an underground live stream attempted to screen the "Musical Cut" online, but this was cancelled after the hosts were sent a cease and desist by the Prince estate.
