= Todd Fisher =

American director, actor and producer (born 1958)

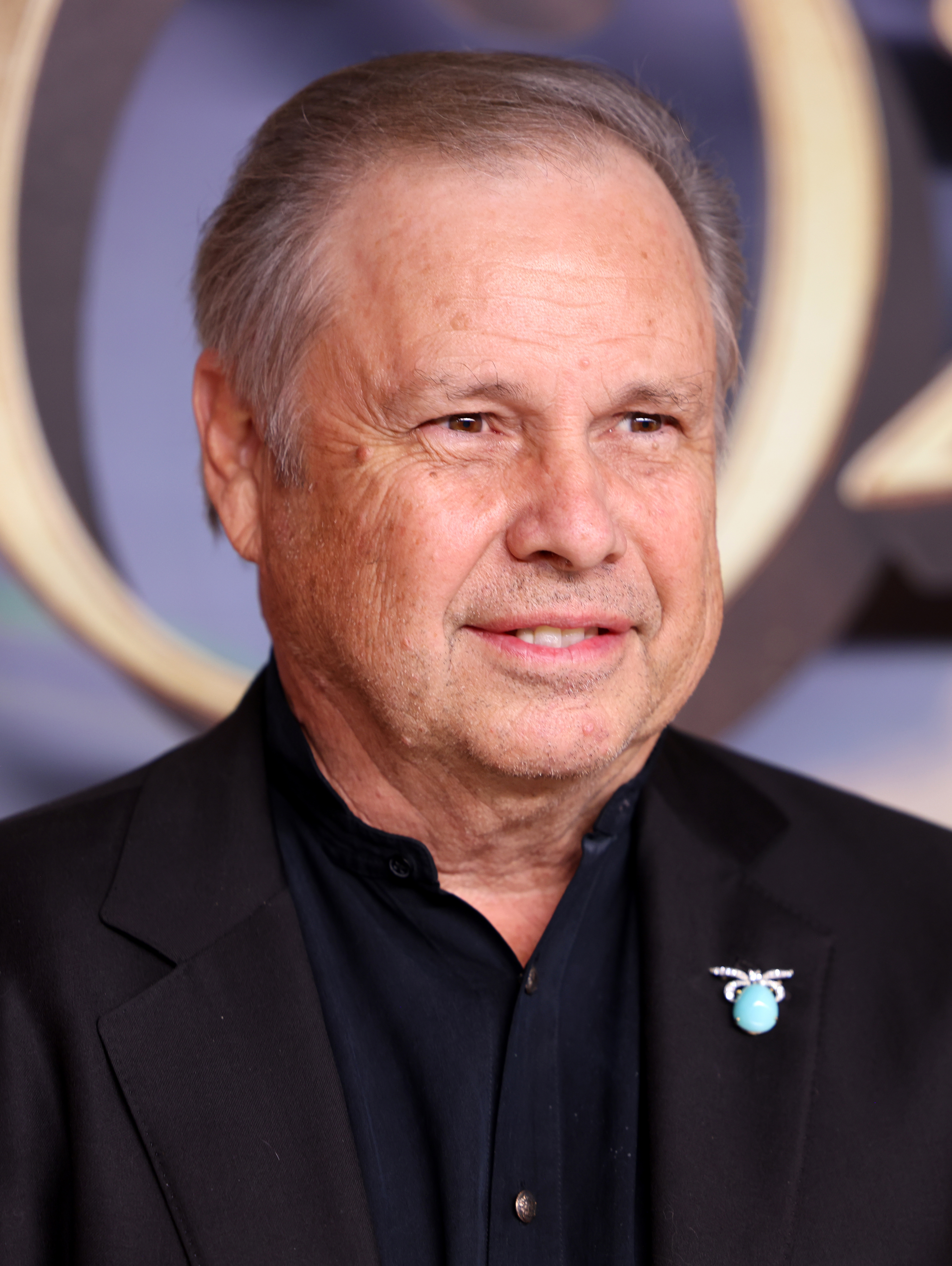
- Fisher in 2025
- Born: Todd Emmanuel Fisher; February 24, 1958 (age 68); Burbank, California, U.S.
- Education: SCI-Arc
- Occupations: Business executive; architect; sound engineer; director; producer; cinematographer
- Years active: 1959–present
- Spouses: Donna Freberg (m. 1981; div. 1986); Christi Zabel (m. 1989; died 2008); Catherine Hickland (m. 2012)
- Parents: Eddie Fisher; Debbie Reynolds
- Relatives: Carrie Fisher (sister); Joely Fisher (half-sister); Tricia Leigh Fisher (half-sister); Billie Lourd (niece)
- Website: toddfisher.com

Todd Emmanuel Fisher (born February 24, 1958) is an American business executive, architect, sound engineer, and filmmaker. He is the son of singer Eddie Fisher and actress Debbie Reynolds.

Fisher has a professional background in architectural design and sound engineering, with experience designing and building sound stages, recording studios, and television facilities. Fisher is also a business executive; the former CEO, president, CFO, and treasurer of the Debbie Reynolds Hotel & Casino (DRHC), Debbie Reynolds Management Company, Inc., and Debbie Reynolds Resorts, Inc. As of 2013, he is the CEO and curator of the Hollywood Motion Picture Museum, which is housed at Debbie Reynolds Studios (DR Studios) in North Hollywood and at his ranch.

== Early life ==
Fisher was born on February 24, 1958, in Burbank, California, to actors Eddie Fisher and Debbie Reynolds. Fisher's paternal grandparents were Ashkenazi Jewish immigrants from Russia, while his Protestant mother's ancestry was Scots-Irish, and English. Fisher, who was named after his father's best friend, Mike Todd, is the second of two children born to his parents. He is the younger brother of Carrie Fisher (1956–2016).

His parents divorced in 1959. A later marriage between his father and actress Connie Stevens resulted in the births of Fisher's two half-sisters, Joely Fisher and Tricia Leigh Fisher. In 1960, his mother married Harry Karl, a shoe store chain owner. His mother and stepfather divorced in 1973, when Fisher was 15 years old.

Fisher attended Beverly Hills High School, graduating in 1976. Following high school graduation, he attended the Southern California Institute of Architecture in Los Angeles.

== Career ==
=== Entertainment industry ===
Fisher's involvement in the entertainment industry began when he was an infant with his appearance in documentaries and short films about his mother. During his youth, Fisher began showing an interest in the technical aspects of filmmaking and focused his efforts on shooting commercials, short films, and documentaries. He was one of the youngest members of the International Alliance of Theatrical Stage Employees (IATSE) labor union. As an adult, his technical and creative experience began in the 1980s. Fisher is a member of the American Society of Cinematographers.

In the early 1980s, Fisher worked with Trinity Broadcasting Network, where he wrote, produced and directed the comedy television program Nightlight, starring as satirical television evangelist, Reverend Hype. The show was modeled on the NBC program Saturday Night Live and featured actors and comedians such as Dan Aykroyd, Jerry Houser, Miguel Ferrer, Rene Russo, and Bernie Leadon.

In 1991, he produced his first feature film, Twogether, starring Nick Cassavetes and Brenda Bakke.

=== Architectural design and sound engineering ===
In 1970, Fisher's mother began curating a large collection of Hollywood memorabilia starting with purchasing items from the Metro-Goldwyn-Mayer auction that same year. She spent $180,000, which accounted for the purchase of thousands of items, serving as the beginning of her ownership of movie memorabilia. In 1972, she established the Hollywood Motion Picture Museum (HMPM) as a federally tax-exempt corporation. The museum has been recognized as the largest individual collection of Hollywood memorabilia in the world.

In 1992, Reynolds and her husband Richard Hamlett bought the Paddlewheel Hotel & Casino on the Las Vegas Strip for $2.2 million at auction. The purchase was made in anticipation of spending $15 million on renovations, which included plans for establishing a home for the Hollywood Motion Picture Museum. The Paddlewheel Hotel & Casino reopened in 1993, renamed The Debbie Reynolds Hotel & Casino. In 1994, Fisher designed the hotel and casino's 500-seat showroom, where Reynolds performed her nightclub act, songs from her career of over 50 years in the entertainment industry. The showroom also serves as a complete television production studio. In addition to the showroom, Fisher also conceived and designed the Hollywood Motion Picture Museum. When Reynolds struggled with the financing to complete the project, she decided to take the company public in order to raise funds. When the museum celebrated its opening the following year, it was one of the first sites in the United States to exhibit high-definition video projection.

=== Hotel, casino, and museum management ===
In March 1994, Fisher was appointed the chief financial officer and treasurer of the Debbie Reynolds Hotel & Casino, joining his mother, who served as chairman and secretary with both holding seats on the board of directors. When he assumed the role of CFO, it became evident that the hotel and casino was losing money each month, due to the company's poor capital structure and unsuccessful lease with the casino operator. Debbie eventually won a $10 million judgment in court against her former husband Richard Hamlett, in part for spurious financial dealing with the hotel and her personally. Additional board members of the Hollywood Museum have included Carrie Fisher, director George Lucas, Shirley MacLaine, and Elizabeth Taylor.

Upon assuming the role of CEO, Fisher began restructuring the company, in order to address financial mismanagement, diminished employee morale, and poor customer service and quality throughout the hotel, casino, and restaurant. Prior to March 31, 1996, Jackpot Enterprises contracted with the company to lease space to operate the casino in the hotel. The company gave notice of intent to terminate the lease agreement with Jackpot in February 1996, in accordance with the terms, owing to monthly loss of revenue on a consistent basis. Gambling operations discontinued as of March 31, 1996. By December 31, 1996, the company was in default, unable to make principal and interest payments on their mortgage. Payroll taxes of approximately $1,063,000, along with other accounts payable and accrued liabilities of approximately $3,643,000, were also in default.

In 1997, Fisher began pursuing avenues to sell the property to timeshare developer ILX (now known as Diamond Resorts International) for $16.8 million. After the deal fell through, Debbie Reynolds Hotel & Casino filed Chapter 11 bankruptcy as part of a reorganization plan. The company entered into a $22.5 million merger agreement with CFI (Central Florida Investments), also known as Westgate Resorts, which would have saved the hotel and the public company. The unsecured creditors rejected the deal and opted to auction the property hoping for a better deal. Over the objection of Management, the property was put up for auction the following year, with the winning bid at $10.65 million, going to the World Wrestling Federation.

By 1999, Reynolds and Fisher began preparing to move the Hollywood Motion Picture Museum to a new location near the Kodak Theatre in Los Angeles, which was scheduled to open in 2004. When the Los Angeles museum's lender could no longer fund the project, the museum was unable to complete construction on the property. In turn, they could not repay a $1.6 million bridge loan, which later became the center of a lawsuit filed against the museum by Gregory Orman.

While the lawsuit between the museum and Orman dragged on in the courts, the museum signed a deal to anchor the proposed Belle Island Village tourist attraction, which was scheduled to debut in fall 2008, in Pigeon Forge, Tennessee. When the developer of the Belle Island Village resort met with financial struggles of their own, the construction lender Regions Bank foreclosed on the unfinished property. In response, the museum itself sought Chapter 11 protection in June 2009. The bank initially agreed to sell the resort property to Tennessee Investment Partners, which is partially owned by the real estate investment firm of Matisse Capital, the original developer of the proposed Belle Island Village. The purchase was scheduled to close by the end of March 2010, with assurances that the buyer intended to reinstate the Hollywood Motion Picture Museum as the centerpiece attraction of the new resort. The deal additionally called for agreements for the new investor to cover the lawsuit and financial claim made by Orman. When the sale of the property to Tennessee Investment Partners and subsequent plans to relocate the museum to Tennessee fell through, Reynolds and Fisher began making plans to liquidate the memorabilia collection.

=== Hollywood memorabilia auctions ===
In 2011, Reynolds and Fisher contracted with Profiles in History to begin auctioning the collection of Hollywood memorabilia, until enough proceeds were generated to pay off their creditors. In statements made to the press, Fisher announced that his mother was "heartbroken" to have to auction off her collection, which was valued at $10.79 million in the bankruptcy filing. The collection was sold in a series of auctions from June to December 2011. On June 18, 2011, Marilyn Monroe's "subway dress", whose skirt is raised by the updraft of a passing subway train in The Seven Year Itch, sold for $4.6 million, far in excess of pre-auction estimates of $1–2 million. Another Monroe dress, worn in Gentlemen Prefer Blondes, fetched $1.2 million; it had been expected to go for $200,000 to $300,000. Estimated at $60,000 to $80,000, a blue cotton dress Judy Garland used in test shots for The Wizard of Oz went for $910,000. In total, the auction grossed $22.8 million. In the second auction, held on December 3, 2011, a still-functioning Panavision PSR 35 mm camera used to film Star Wars went for $520,000, breaking records for Star Wars memorabilia and vintage cameras.

== Personal life ==
In 1980, Fisher became a born-again Christian and was subsequently ordained as a minister in 1982. Following his ordination, he founded Hiding Place Church, along with musician Henry Cutrona of Christian country rock band Gentle Faith. A non-denominational, charismatic congregation, the church first met in North Hollywood at his mother's DR Studios. After outgrowing that location, the church was moved to Beverly Theater in Beverly Hills. By 1986, the church had relocated from that location to Emerson Middle School in Westwood, Los Angeles, California with an average Sunday attendance of 1,000.

On February 15, 1981, Fisher married his high school sweetheart, Donna Freberg, daughter of Stan Freberg. After the couple's divorce, Fisher married Christi Zabel. With their marriage, Fisher became stepfather to Vanessa, James, and Brandon, Zabel's children from her marriage to singer Johnny Rivers. Zabel died from cancer in 2008. Fisher then married actress-businessperson Catherine Hickland on December 22, 2012. The couple have a home in Las Vegas and a ranch in California.

== Filmography ==
Acting

- 1959: A Visit with Debbie Reynolds (short) – as baby
- 1969: Debbie Reynolds and the Sound of Children (TV movie) – as Cub Scout
- 1981: Nightlight (TBN series) – as Reverend Hype
- 2001: These Old Broads (TV movie) – as Timothy

As himself

- 1963: Hollywood Without Make-Up (documentary)
- 2012: Hollywood Treasure

Cinematography

- 1988: Find Your Way Back: A Salute to the Space Shuttle (video documentary)
- 1989: Blue Angels: A Backstage Pass (video documentary)
- 2002: Cinerama Adventure (documentary)
- 2013: South Dakota

Directing

- 1991: Movie Memories with Debbie Reynolds (TV series – 12 episodes)

Editing

- 1994: Twogether

Producing

- 1994: Twogether
- 2017: Bright Lights: Starring Carrie Fisher and Debbie Reynolds (HBO documentary)

== See also ==
- Hollywood Motion Picture and Television Museum
- List of film memorabilia
