= Pretty Smart =

- Directed by: Dimitri Logothetis
- Written by: Melanie J. Alschuler; Jeff Begun
- Produced by: Jeff Begun; Ken Soloman
- Starring: Tricia Leigh Fisher; Patricia Arquette; Dennis Cole
- Cinematography: Dimitris Papakonstadis
- Edited by: Daniel Gross
- Music by: Eddie Arkin; Jay Levy
- Production companies: Balcor Film Investors; Chroma III Productions; Film Capital Associates
- Distributed by: New World Pictures
- Release date: March 1987
- Running time: 95 minutes
- Country: United States
- Language: English

Pretty Smart is a 1987 American comedy-drama film starring Tricia Leigh Fisher and Patricia Arquette. It was directed by Dimitri Logothetis. It was Arquette's first film. It was mostly filmed in Athens with most interiors and some exteriors at the Hotel Grande Bretagne. Music was written and produced by Jay Levy and Ed Arkin.

== Plot ==
In an effort to curb her wild antics after a recent arrest, the parents of Daphne “Zig” (Tricia Leigh Fisher) send her to the Ogilvy Academy, an elite boarding school in Greece, along with her well-behaved fraternal twin sister Jennifer (Lisa Lörient). Determined to be expelled at the earliest opportunity, Zig will go to extreme lengths to have her way.

Unbeknownst to the two sisters and the other students, the male headmaster, Richard Crawley, is involved in drug trafficking and recording surveillance videos of the students engaging in sexual acts.

The school itself does not have a traditional curriculum as would be seen in most prep schools, with a sexist tendency. For example, the girls are taught proper dining etiquette, ballroom dancing, and diction lesson from an Indian who cannot speak English well. The only decent teacher is Sara Gentry, who teaches literature.

Consequently the school has two major cliques: the Preens and the Subs. The Preens conform to the sexist curriculum of the school and dress feminine, while the Subs (short for Subhuman) object to the infrastructure of the school. Daphne is welcomed into the Subs, while Jen joins the Preens.

After a PR event involving a nearby boys’ prep school (where the Preens are secretly recorded having sex with the boys in question), the Preens are rewarded with a day trip to Paris. The trip is actually a ruse for Crawley to smuggle drugs. Sympathizing with the Subs, Ms. Gentry secretly does a field trip around the island for them. Crawley finds out and fires her.

Sometime later the girls throw a birthday party for Daphne and gift her a boombox. However, Crawley confiscates it. When Daphne and her fellow Subs sneak into his office to get it back, they discover the surveillance videos and find out about his drug trafficking operation. The Preens are informed about the situation and team up with the subs to expose him. Crawley leaves the campus and Gentry returns to become the new administrator of the school. Seeing that things will get better under Gentry’s leadership, Daphne enthusiastically decides to stay at the school.

== Cast ==
- Tricia Leigh Fisher as Daphne "Zig" Ziegler
- Lisa Lörient as Jennifer Ziegler
- Patricia Arquette as Zero
- Dennis Cole as Richard Crawley
- Elizabeth Davis as Diane
- Kimberly B. Delfin as Yuko
- Joely Fisher as Averil
- Charlotte-Michele Grenzer as Michelle
- Syndle Kirkland as Andrea
- Holly Nelson as Jessica
- Julie Kristen Smith as Samantha Falconwright
- Paris Vaughan as Torch
- Kim Waltrip as Sara Gentry
- Philece Sampler as Beth

== DVD release ==
Pretty Smart was released on Region 2 DVD in 2005 by Boulevard Entertainment.
