= Hollywood Motion Picture and Television Museum =

The Hollywood Motion Picture and Television Museum was a museum project proposed in the early 1960s and planned to be built on a 4-acre site directly across from the Hollywood Bowl on Highland Ave. It acquired a significant collection of film and television artifacts which remain available, held by the Margaret Herrick Library of the Academy of Motion Picture Arts and Sciences, and partly or wholly duplicated at three other institutions.

== History ==
The project was preceded and followed by other proposed and partly or wholly realized "Hollywood Museum" projects, including one developed and promoted by Debbie Reynolds (1932–2016) involving a nonprofit organization legally founded in 1972 which amassed a different collection of artifacts. The Debbie Reynolds-related project's 501c3 nonprofit had gone inactive by 2013. Todd Fisher, CEO of Debbie Reynolds Hotel & Casino and involved in other Debbie Reynolds projects, has headed "the Hollywood Motion Picture Museum, which is housed at Debbie Reynolds Studios (DR Studios) in North Hollywood and at his ranch".

Plans for the 1960s project—which in retrospect were perhaps too ambitious—included two sound stages, an observation gallery, where visitors would be able to view the actual production of motion picture and television shows, and a theater with a seating capacity of 500 people, where films of the past and present would be shown. In addition, there was plans for projection rooms for private viewing or lectures, a library, restaurant and research facilities. A major portion of the museum was to be devoted to displays, depicting the history of motion picture, television and radio and recording industries and showing the technical aspects of each.

Plans advanced as far as having a design developed by noted architect William Pereira.

The project accumulated a significant collection, including 71 linear feet of papers, 76 linear feet of photos, and 66 items of art.

== See also ==
- Academy Museum of Motion Pictures, project located at Wilshire & Fairfax, planned to be opened in 2021
- Hollywood Museum
- Hollywood Heritage Museum
- Hollywood Motion Picture Museum
