= Ellen Albertini Dow =

American actress (1913–2015)

- Dow as Rosie in The Wedding Singer
- Born: Ellen Rose Albertini; November 16, 1913; Mount Carmel, Pennsylvania, U.S.
- Died: May 4, 2015 (aged 101); Los Angeles, California, U.S.
- Burial place: Saint Peter's Cemetery
- Education: Cornell University (1935)
- Occupations: Actress; acting coach
- Years active: 1985–2013
- Spouse: Eugene Francis Dow Jr. (m. 1951; died 2004)

Ellen Rose Albertini Dow (November 16, 1913 – May 4, 2015) was an American film and television character actress and drama coach. She portrayed feisty old ladies and is best known as the rapping grandmother Rosie in The Wedding Singer (1998), performing "Rapper's Delight". Dow's other film roles include elderly lady Mary Cleary who "outs" her grandson in Wedding Crashers, Disco Dottie in 54, the recipient of Christopher Lloyd's character's slapstick in Radioland Murders and a choir nun in Sister Act. She was best known to small screen audiences for her guest appearances on sitcoms The Golden Girls (playing Lillian, a friend of Sophia's) and Will & Grace (as Karen Walker's mother-in-law Sylvia).

== Early life ==
Albertini was born on November 16, 1913, in Mount Carmel, Pennsylvania, the seventh and youngest child of Italian immigrant parents, Ellen and Oliver, from Non Valley, Trentino. She studied dance and piano at age five and would later move to New York City, where she studied and worked with renowned dancers and choreographers Hanya Holm and Martha Graham.

=== Secondary education ===
Dow earned a B.A. and M.A. in theatre from Cornell University, where she became a member of Kappa Delta sorority, graduating in 1935. Dow studied acting with Michael Shurtleff and Uta Hagen, and worked with mimes Marcel Marceau and Jacques Lecoq in NYC.

== Career ==
=== Educator ===
When Dow moved to Los Angeles with her husband, she taught drama at Los Angeles City College. She and her husband later taught at Los Angeles Pierce College.

=== Acting ===
Albertini Dow did not start acting on screen until the 1980s, when she was in her seventies. Her television work includes appearances in such television series as Star Trek: The Next Generation, The Golden Girls, The Wonder Years, Family Matters, Newhart, Designing Women, Just Shoot Me, ER, Will & Grace, Seinfeld, Ned's Declassified, Hannah Montana, Scrubs, Sister, Sister, According to Jim, Six Feet Under, Wings, The Nanny and My Name Is Earl.

Her film appearances include Tough Guys (1986), My Blue Heaven (1990), Sister Act (1992), Sister Act 2: Back in the Habit (1993), Radioland Murders (1994), Problem Child 3 (1995), The Wedding Singer (1998), 54 (1998), Patch Adams (1998), Road Trip (2000) and Wedding Crashers (2005).

== Personal life and death ==
Dow married Eugene Dow Jr. on June 27, 1951. Eugene died on October 11, 2004. They had no children.

Dow died on May 4, 2015, at the age of 101 due to pneumonia.

== Filmography ==
=== Film ===
Year	Title	Role	Notes	ref
1985	American Drive-In	Allison		
1986	Tough Guys	Old Lady		
1986	Body Slam	Organist		
1986	Munchies	Little Old Lady		
1986	Walk Like a Man	Organist		
1988	Going to the Chapel	Grandma Haldane		
1990	My Blue Heaven	Nun		
1990	Genuine Risk	Receptionist		
1991	Blood and Concrete	Old Lady		
1992	Memoirs of an Invisible Man	Mrs. Coulson		
1992	Sister Act	Choir Nun #1		
1992	Twogether	Mrs. Norton		
1992	Space Case	Betsy		
1993	Sister Act 2: Back in the Habit	Choir Nun #1		
1994	Radioland Murders	Organist		
1995	Problem Child 3	Lila Duvane		
1998	The Wedding Singer	Rosie		
1998	Carnival of Souls	Mrs. Meltzer		
1998	54	Disco Dottie		
1998	Patch Adams	Aggie Kennedy		
2000	Ready to Rumble	Mrs. MacKenzie		
2000	Road Trip	Mrs. Manilow		
2001	Longshot	Mrs. Fleisher		
2002	Eight Crazy Nights	See's Candies Box	Voice	
2005	Wedding Crashers	Mary Cleary		
2005	Halfway Decent	Mrs. Kahn		
2006	Fat Girls	Mildred		
2007	The Blue Hour	Anabella		
2008	Lonely Street	Lydia the Librarian		
2009	Without a Paddle: Nature's Calling	Mrs. Bessler		
2010	The Invited	Natalie Shaw		
2011	Not Another Not Another Movie	Older Rose		
2012	She Wants Me	Grandma Elma		
2013	Frank the Bastard	Dora	Final film role	

=== Television ===
Year	Title	Role	Notes	ref
1986	The Twilight Zone	Mrs. Hotchkiss	Episode: "Need to Know"	
1986	Mr. Belvedere	Old Lady	Episode: "Grandma"	
1986	The Twilight Zone	Old Woman	Episode: "The Storyteller"	
1987	Beauty and the Beast	Anna Lausch	Episode: "Nor Iron Bars a Cage"	
1988	Moonlighting	Mrs. Baer	Episode: "Los Dos DiPestos"	
1988	Mr. Belvedere	Old Lady	Episode: "The Trip: Part 1"	
1988	Webster	Mrs. Crane	Episode: "Papa's Big Romance"	
1988	The Golden Girls	Mrs. Leonard	Episode: "The Days and Nights of Sophia Petrillo"	
1989	The Golden Girls	Lillian	Episode: "Sophia's Choice"	
1991	The Golden Girls	Sarah	Episode: "Older and Wiser"	
1992	The Wonder Years	Mrs. Tambora	Episode: "Kevin Delivers"	
1992	Down the Shore	The Old Woman	Episode: "Atlantic City"	
1992	Wings	Debbie	Episode: "The Customer's Usually Right"	
1993	Star Trek: The Next Generation	Felisa Howard	Episode: "Sub Rosa"	
1993	Family Matters	Elderly Lady	Episode: "Scenes From The Mall"	
1994	Family Matters	Mrs. Ostendorf	Episode: "That's What Friends Are For"	
1995	ER	Mrs. Riblet	Episode: "Hell & High Water"	
1995	Seinfeld	Peterman's mother	Episode: "The Secret Code"	
1997	Beyond Belief - Fact or Fiction	Aunt Connie	Segment: "Mystery Lock"	
1997	Sabrina the Teenage Witch	Homeowner	Episode: "A River of Candy Corn Runs Through It"	
1999	Just Shoot Me!	Mrs. Gallo	Episode: "Jack Vents"	
2001	Will & Grace	Sylvia Walker	Episode: "The Young and the Tactless"	
2005	Scrubs	Betty	Episode: "My Faith in Humanity"	
2005	Six Feet Under	Roberta	Episode: "Time Flies"	
2005	My Name Is Earl	Gertrude Balboa	Episode: "Broke Joy's Fancy Figurine"	
2006	Hannah Montana	Katherine McCord	Episode: "Debt It Be"	
2006	Ned's Declassified School Survival Guide	Miss Knapp	Episode: "Social Studies/Embarrassment"	
2006	The Emperor's New School	Azma	Voice, episode: "The Bride of Kuzco"	
2007	Cold Case	Audrey Abruzzi	Episode: "Torn"	
2009	According to Jim	Emily Rose	Episode: "Diamonds are a Ghoul's Best Friend"	
2011	Shameless	The Real Aunt Ginger	Episode: "Aunt Ginger"	
2012	Family Guy	Aunt Helen	Voice, episode: "Jesus, Mary and Joseph!"	
2013	New Girl	Aunt Ruthie	Episode: "Chicago"	

== See also ==
- List of centenarians (actors, filmmakers and entertainers)
