= Bringing Out the Dead =

1999 American film by Martin Scorsese

- Theatrical release poster
- Directed by: Martin Scorsese
- Screenplay by: Paul Schrader
- Based on: Bringing Out the Dead by Joe Connelly
- Produced by: Barbara De Fina; Scott Rudin
- Starring: Nicolas Cage; Patricia Arquette; John Goodman; Ving Rhames; Tom Sizemore
- Cinematography: Robert Richardson
- Edited by: Thelma Schoonmaker
- Music by: Elmer Bernstein
- Production companies: Paramount Pictures; Touchstone Pictures; Scott Rudin Productions
- Distributed by: Paramount Pictures (United States); Buena Vista International (International)
- Release date: October 22, 1999
- Running time: 121 minutes
- Country: United States
- Language: English
- Budget: $32 million
- Box office: $16.8 million

Bringing Out the Dead is a 1999 American psychological drama film directed by Martin Scorsese and written by Paul Schrader, based on the 1998 novel by Joe Connelly. It stars Nicolas Cage, Patricia Arquette, John Goodman, Ving Rhames, and Tom Sizemore. The plot depicts 48 hours in the life of a depressed New York City paramedic (Cage).

Bringing Out the Dead was released in the United States on October 22, 1999, by Paramount Pictures, while it was released internationally by Touchstone Pictures through Buena Vista International. It was the final film to be released on LaserDisc in the United States. It received generally positive reviews from critics but was a disappointment at the box office, grossing just $16 million against its $32 million production budget.

== Plot ==
In early 1990s Manhattan, paramedic Frank Pierce has depression, insomnia, and occupational burnout having not saved any patients in months after botching the resuscitation of Rose, a homeless girl. He has begun to hallucinate Rose's ghost. One night, Frank and his partner Larry respond to a dispatcher's call by the family of a Mr. Burke who has entered cardiac arrest. There, Frank befriends Burke's distraught daughter Mary, a former drug addict, and discovers Mary was friends with Noel, a drug addict and delinquent who is frequently sent to the hospital.

After a few minor calls, Frank and Larry respond to the aftermath of a shooting, where Frank notices two vials of "Red Death" heroin roll out from a surviving victim's sleeve. While in the back of the ambulance with Frank and Noel, the victim attempts to repent for his drug dealing ways but dies before they can reach the hospital.

The next day, Frank is paired with the charismatic, fervently religious Marcus. The two respond to a call to a man reported to be in cardiac arrest in a club. When they arrive, Frank diagnoses that he is, in fact, suffering from an overdose caused by Red Death. As Frank injects the man with Narcan, Marcus starts a prayer circle with the baffled club-goers, and just as his preaching climaxes, the overdosed boy regains consciousness.

On the way back to the hospital, Frank visits Mary's apartment to tell her that her father's condition is improving. Mary tells him that her family hosted and fed Noel for a complete year, and that her father showed more care for a stranger than for his own children. Frank and Marcus then respond to a call from a man whose girlfriend is giving birth to twins. Frank and Marcus rush the two infants and mother to the hospital, where Marcus brings the mother and healthy twin to the maternity ward, while Frank attempts to revive the other twin with the hospital staff. The hospital is unable to revive the smaller twin, and a dismayed Frank starts drinking before Marcus joins him and crashes the ambulance into a parked car. They are unharmed and laugh the incident off.

The following morning, Frank sees Mary leaving the hospital and follows her to an apartment block; Mary tells Frank that she is visiting a friend and he escorts her to the room. After waiting a while, Frank barges in and discovers that it is a drug den run by a dealer named Cy Coates. Mary admits that she has turned back to drugs to cope with her father's condition, and as Frank tries to get her to leave, Cy offers him some pills.

In a moment of desperation, Frank takes the drugs and begins to hallucinate, seeing more ghosts of his patients. Once sober, he grabs Mary and carries her out of the building. While visiting a comatose Burke in the hospital, Frank starts hearing Burke's voice in his head, telling Frank to let him die, but he resuscitates Burke instead.

In his third shift, Frank is paired with Tom Wolls, a fervent and messianic guy with violent tendencies. The pair respond to a call to Cy's drug den where a shooting has occurred, and find Cy impaled on a railing. Frank holds onto Cy as emergency services cut the railing but both are nearly flung off the edge before being pulled back up. Cy then thanks Frank for saving his life and becomes the first patient Frank has saved in months.

Afterwards, Frank agrees to help Tom beat up Noel, and chase him down. Frank starts to hallucinate again, snapping out of it just as he comes upon Tom beating Noel with a baseball bat. Frank saves Noel. As Frank visits Burke again, the voice pleads for death once more, and Frank removes Burke's breathing apparatus, causing him to fatally enter cardiac arrest. Frank then heads to Mary's apartment to inform her that he has died. He hallucinates Rose's ghost for a final time, obtaining her forgiveness. Mary accepts her father's death. Frank is invited in and falls asleep with Mary.

== Cast ==
- Nicolas Cage as Frank Pierce
- Patricia Arquette as Mary Burke
- John Goodman as Larry
- Ving Rhames as Marcus
- Tom Sizemore as Tom Wolls
- Marc Anthony as Noel
- Mary Beth Hurt as Nurse Constance
- Cliff Curtis as Cy Coates
- Nestor Serrano as Dr. Hazmat
- Aida Turturro as Nurse Crupp
- Sonja Sohn as Kanita
- Cynthia Roman as Rose
- Afemo Omilami as Griss
- Cullen Oliver Johnson as Mr. Burke
- Arthur Nascarella as Captain Barney
- Martin Scorsese as the voice of Male Dispatcher
- Julyana Soelistyo as Sister Fetus
- Phyllis Somerville as Mrs. Burke
- Michael K. Williams as a Drug Dealer
- Queen Latifah as the voice of Dispatcher Love
- Judy Reyes as an ICU Nurse

== Production ==
Bringing Out the Dead is an adaptation of the 1998 novel of the same name by Joe Connelly.

The idea of contacting Nicolas Cage to play the main character came to Martin Scorsese after a conversation with Brian De Palma, who had worked with Cage on Snake Eyes.

== Soundtrack ==
- "T.B. Sheets" – Van Morrison
- "The September of My Years" – Frank Sinatra
- "You Can't Put Your Arms Around a Memory" – Johnny Thunders
- "Bell Boy" – The Who
- "Mr. Highway" – Elmer Bernstein
- "Threat" – Elmer Bernstein
- "Llegaste a Mi" – Marc Anthony
- "What's the Frequency, Kenneth?" – R.E.M.
- "Too Many Fish in the Sea" – The Marvelettes
- "Don't You Worry 'Bout a Thing" – Stevie Wonder
- "So What!" – Jane's Addiction
- "These Are Days" – 10,000 Maniacs
- "Nowhere to Run" – Martha & The Vandellas
- "I and I Survive (Slavery Days)" – Burning Spear
- "Rivers of Babylon" – The Melodians
- "Le Sacre du Printemps (The Rite of Spring)" – New York Philharmonic
- "Rang Tang Ding Dong (I Am a Japanese Sandman)" – The Cellos
- "Combination of the Two" – Big Brother & The Holding Company
- "Hasta Ayer" – Marc Anthony
- "Janie Jones" – The Clash
- "Red Red Wine" – UB40
- "I'm So Bored with the U.S.A." – The Clash

== Release ==
The film premiered in Los Angeles and New York on the same day, October 22. 1999.

== Reception ==
=== Critical response ===
On Rotten Tomatoes, Bringing Out the Dead has an approval rating of 74% based on 117 reviews, with an average rating of 6.7/10. The site's critics consensus reads, "Stunning and compelling, Scorsese and Cage succeed at satisfying the audience." Metacritic assigned the film a weighted average score of 72 out of 100, based on 34 critics, indicating "generally favorable" reviews. Audiences surveyed by CinemaScore gave the film an average grade of "C−" on an A+ to F scale.

Roger Ebert gave it a perfect four-star rating, writing, "To look at Bringing Out the Dead—to look, indeed, at almost any Scorsese film—is to be reminded that film can touch us urgently and deeply." Years later, Scorsese reflected to Ebert that Bringing Out the Dead "failed at the box office, and was rejected by a lot of the critics." Yet he added: "I had 10 years of ambulances. My parents, in and out of hospitals. Calls in the middle of the night. I was exorcising all of that. Those city paramedics are heroes — and saints, they're saints. I grew up next to the Bowery, watching the people who worked there, the Salvation Army, Dorothy Day's Catholic Worker Movement, all helping the lost souls. They're the same sort of people."

Thelma Schoonmaker, the film's editor, praised the movie and said: "It's the only one of [Scorsese's] films, I think, that hasn't gotten its due. It's a beautiful film, but it was hard for people to take, I think. Unexpected. But I think it's great." She claims that the film initially was mis-marketed as a car-chase film: "What happened was, that film was about compassion, and it was sold, I think, as a car chase movie. When I saw the trailer I said, 'Wait a minute! That's not what the movie's about!' I think people were made nervous by the theme of it, which I think is beautiful. I think it'll get its due."

In 2022, Nicolas Cage singled out Bringing Out the Dead as one of the best movies he ever made.

=== Box office ===
Bringing Out the Dead debuted at #4 in 1,936 theatres with a weekend gross of $6,193,052. The film grossed $16.7 million against a production budget of $32 million, making it a box office bomb.

== See also ==
- Opioid epidemic

== Sources ==
- Daniel, Rob (2021). Cape Fear. Liverpool, England: Liverpool University Press. ISBN 978-1-800-85701-8.
