= Twogether (film) =

- Directed by: Andrew Chiaramonte
- Written by: Andrew Chiaramonte
- Produced by: Emmett Alston; Andrew Chiaramonte
- Starring: Nick Cassavetes; Brenda Bakke
- Cinematography: Eugene D. Shlugleit
- Edited by: Andrew Chiaramonte; Todd Fisher
- Music by: Nigel Holton
- Release date: May 1992 (Cannes)
- Running time: 120 minutes
- Country: United States
- Language: English

Twogether is a 1992 American romantic comedy-drama film written and directed by Andrew Chiaramonte and starring Nick Cassavetes and Brenda Bakke.

== Cast ==
- Nick Cassavetes as Wolfgang Amadeus 'John' Madler
- Brenda Bakke as Allison McKenzie
- Jeremy Piven as Arnie
- Jim Beaver as Oscar
- Tom Dugan as Paul
- Damian London as Mark Saffron
- Ellen Albertini Dow as Mrs. Norton
