= 'Til Death =

American sitcom (2006–2010)

- Created by: Josh Goldsmith; Cathy Yuspa
- Starring: Brad Garrett; Joely Fisher; Kat Foster; Eddie Kaye Thomas; J. B. Smoove; Timm Sharp; Lindsey Broad; Kate Micucci
- Composers: Bruce Miller; Jason Miller
- Country of origin: United States
- Original language: English
- No. of seasons: 4
- No. of episodes: 81 (list of episodes)

Production
- Executive producers: Josh Goldsmith; Cathy Yuspa; Brad Garrett; Glenn Robbins; Doug Wald; Steve Skrovan; Tim Hobert; Don Reo; Dean Lorey; David S. Rosenthal
- Producers: Alex Barnow; Marc Firek; Annette Sahakian Davis; DJ Nash; Brad Garrett; Glenn Robbins; Doug Wald
- Camera setup: Multi-camera
- Running time: 30 minutes
- Production companies: Goldsmith/Yuspa Productions (seasons 1–3); Impact Zone Productions (season 4); Sony Pictures Television

Original release
- Network: Fox
- Release: September 7, 2006 – June 20, 2010

'Til Death is an American sitcom that aired on Fox from September 7, 2006, to June 20, 2010. The series was created by husband and wife team Josh Goldsmith and Cathy Yuspa, who were also the writers and executive producers. The show focuses on Eddie and Joy Stark (Brad Garrett and Joely Fisher), a couple married for 23 years who live in a suburb of Philadelphia, Pennsylvania. The series was produced by Goldsmith/Yuspa Productions (seasons 1–3), Impact Zone Productions (season 4) and Sony Pictures Television.

== Premise ==
'Til Death centers on Eddie and Joy Stark, and their life, relationship and behavior after 23 years of marriage. The first two seasons often focus on the conflict between the Starks and their newlywed neighbors, Jeff and Steph Woodcock (Eddie Kaye Thomas and Kat Foster). The second season introduces a new character named Kenny Westchester (J. B. Smoove) who is Eddie's friend from the Big Brothers Organization.

The third season focuses primarily on Eddie and Joy's relationship with Kenny after he moves in with them.

The fourth and final season focuses on the Starks coping with life with their daughter Ally (Lindsey Broad, then Kate Micucci) and new son-in-law Doug (Timm Sharp), who live in a biodiesel-powered Airstream motorhome in the Starks' back yard. The series takes place in suburban Philadelphia in Cheltenham Township.

== Episodes ==
Season	Episodes	Originally released	
Season	Episodes	First released	Last released
1	22	September 7, 2006	April 11, 2007
2	15	September 19, 2007	May 14, 2008
3	7	September 10, 2008	October 8, 2008
4	37	October 2, 2009	June 20, 2010

== Characters ==
=== Main ===
- Eddie Stark (Brad Garrett): Eddie is a high school history teacher who has been married to Joy for over two decades.
- Joy Stark (Joely Fisher): Joy is Eddie's sardonic wife who initially works as a travel agent, and later takes a job at Eddie's school.
- Jeff Woodcock (Eddie Kaye Thomas) (seasons 1–3): Jeff is an optimistic newlywed next-door neighbor to the Starks and also the vice-principal at the high school where Eddie teaches.
- Steph Woodcock (Kat Foster) (seasons 1–3): She is unemployed and developing her master's thesis, on which she is making little progress.
- Kenny Westchester (J. B. Smoove) (recurring, seasons 2 and 4; main, seasons 3): Kenny is Eddie's "little brother" from the Big Brother program and a recent divorcé.
- Allison Stark (Krysten Ritter (recurring, seasons 1–2); Laura Clery (recurring, seasons 3–4); Lindsey Broad (main, season 4); Kate Micucci (main, season 4): Allison "Ally" Mayweather Stark is Eddie and Joy's adult daughter who is away at college in early episodes, but is referenced in the pilot and shows up occasionally. During the show's fourth and final season, she lives in a biodiesel-powered Airstream motorhome in her parents' backyard with her boyfriend and later husband, Doug. The fact that she is played by different actresses becomes a running gag in later episodes.
- Doug Von Stuessen (Timm Sharp) (recurring, seasons 1–3; main, season 4): Doug is Allison's boyfriend and later husband who lives in a biodiesel-powered Airstream motorhome in the Starks' backyard with Allison during the show's fourth and final season. He is an idealistic hippie who becomes convinced his whole life is a sitcom.

==== Notes ====
- Kat Foster and Eddie Kaye Thomas, who played Steph and Jeff Woodcock, respectively, left the show after season 2, having "moved onto other projects". However, their characters continued to appear in several episodes of season three, and even one episode of season four, as these were filmed during the season two production batch but were not aired until later because of the 2007 Writers strike.
- J.B. Smoove, who began appearing late in season two, was added to the show's main cast in season 3, playing Eddie's friend Kenny. His ex-wife appeared in the premiere episode of the third season. Smoove was subsequently dropped from the main cast in the episodes produced in the season 4 production batch.

=== Recurring ===
- Karl (Nick Bakay)
- Whitey (Martin Mull)
- Principal Duffy (Kathleen Rose Perkins)
- Cofeld (Anthony Anderson)
- Nicole (Margaret Cho)
- Stan (Jerry Lambert)
- Russ (Will Sasso)
- Steven (Kevin Nealon)
- Simona (Susan Yeagley)
- Donna, Joy's mother (Lainie Kazan)
- George Von Stuessen (Barry Bostwick)
- Tina, Kenny's ex-wife (Kym Whitley)
- Beth (Alison La Placa)
- Stu (Joe Manganiello)

== Broadcast and production ==
The first season of 'Til Death ran from September 7, 2006, to April 11, 2007, and contained 22 episodes. The series initially aired Thursdays at 8/7c alongside fellow freshman sitcom Happy Hour. In November, the series was given a full season order and then later paired with The War at Home. Beginning in March 2007, the show was given the coveted time slot directly following American Idol's results show, which led to an improvement in its ratings. In May, 'Til Death was renewed for a second season.

The second season ran from September 2007 to May 2008 and consisted of 15 episodes, during which it aired on Wednesdays at 8:30 p.m. following a new comedy Back to You. Late in 2007, production was halted because of the 2007–2008 writers' strike; only 19 episodes were produced. The series went on hiatus beginning November 28, but returned with a new episode on a special night in March 2008 at 9:30 p.m. Then in April, 'Til Death moved again to Wednesdays at 8:00 p.m. leading into Back to You. In May, the series was given an 18-episode order for its third season, while comedy companion Back to You was canceled.

The third season consisted of 22 episodes (four of which were produced during the second season) and initially ran from September to October 2008. During this brief run of seven episodes, 'Til Death aired Wednesdays at 9/8c alongside a new comedy Do Not Disturb. The ratings for both shows were low, and as a result, the network pulled the sitcom from its November schedule. Despite not airing all of season three and low ratings, 'Til Death was renewed for a fourth season in January 2009. Fox confirmed at its upfront presentation in May that the new season would air on Friday nights in the fall. The surprise renewal was attributed to a significant licensing discount offered to Fox by the production company of 'Til Death (Sony Pictures Television), because it needed one more season to make the program viable for syndication.

The fourth and final season premiered in October 2009 at a new time, Fridays at 8:30/7:30c, following a new sitcom, Brothers, starring former NFL player Michael Strahan. This season is notable in that a large number of episodes produced for the third season, but previously unaired by Fox, were shown alongside new episodes produced for season four. Four new episodes of 'Til Death aired sequentially on Christmas Day from 8/7c until 10/9c. The schedule changed again, when 'Til Death moved to Sundays at 7/6c and 7:30/6:30c on January 31, 2010, with these first two episodes airing against Super Bowl XLIV. Eventually, it was paired for three episodes with the soon-to-be-canceled comedy Sons of Tucson. The fourth season (and series) finale aired on May 23, 2010, although three unaired episodes formerly consigned for season three were burned off in June. Two months prior, Fox finally canceled production of 'Til Death after years of below-average ratings.

=== Syndication ===
On July 26, 2011, it was announced that the show was picked up for syndication by affiliates The CW Plus, and WGN America, which debuted the program on September 12, 2011. It was also announced on July 28, 2011, that Spike had picked up the show for syndication, which debuted on October 3, 2011. In June 2013, TV Land brought the show, but was removed later on. From 2019 to 2020, the show aired on GetTV.

== Home media ==
DVD name	Region 1	Region 4	Episode Number
The Complete First Season	August 21, 2007	February 13, 2008	22
The Complete Second Season	January 13, 2009	TBA	15
The Complete Third Season	November 3, 2015	TBA	22
The Complete Series	April 20, 2021	November 8, 2017	81

== Ratings ==
Seasonal ratings based on average total viewers per episode of 'Til Death on Fox:

Season	Timeslot (EDT)	Season Premiere	Season Finale	TV Season	Rank	Viewers (in millions)
1	Thurs. 8/7c (September 7 – February 15) Wed. 9:30/8:30c (March 14 – April 11)	September 7, 2006	April 11, 2007	2006-2007	#82	7.1
2	Wed. 8:30/7:30c (September 19 – November 14) Wed. 8/7c (April 16 – May 14)	September 19, 2007	May 14, 2008	2007-2008	#131	6.1
3	Wed. 9/8c (September 10 – October 8)	September 10, 2008	October 8, 2008	2008-2009	#141	4.4
4	Fri. 8:30/7:30c (October 2 – December 25) Sun. 7/6c (January 31 – June 20)	October 2, 2009	June 20, 2010	2009-2010	#116	2.4
