= Joe Connelly (writer) =

American writer

- Born: New York City, U.S.
- Education: Colgate University
- Occupation: Writer

Joe Connelly is an American writer, best known for his first novel, Bringing Out the Dead (1998). It was a best seller and also adapted as a film directed by Martin Scorsese.

A native of New York City, Connelly now lives in the Adirondacks with his wife and family.

== Biography ==
Connelly was born in St Clare's Hospital in Hell's Kitchen (address 408 West 52nd Street), where his mother worked. She had met his father years before at a dance in the hospital's basement. They were working-class, and raised Connelly in Warwick, New York. He secured a scholarship to Colgate University, on a path to become the first member of his family to go to college. But after three years, he dropped out to pursue writing.

For nine years he worked as a paramedic at St. Clare's Hospital. He wrote in his spare time over that period, in a small apartment on the Upper West Side. He also wrote while living in Ireland and traveling in Eastern Europe for a considerable period. During this time, Connelly was encouraged by a creative writing professor at Columbia University.

His debut novel, "Bringing Out the Dead"(1998), is autobiographical in nature. It explores the life of a paranoid, hollow-eyed paramedic who works the graveyard shift in Hell's Kitchen, the barrio bounding the phantasmagoria of Times Square. Having seen so much human suffering on the job, Frank, the main character, has turned inwards. He is despondent to the point of becoming a drunk, his life a living hell.

The novel was an immediate bestseller on publication. It was optioned for $100,000, and was produced as a major motion picture of the same name in 1999. Bringing Out the Dead was directed by Martin Scorsese and the screenplay was adapted by Paul Schrader. Though the film was a critical success, it fell short of box office expectations.

Connelly's second novel, Crumbtown (2003), didn't sell as well as the first. Although the book's characters were similar to the down-and-out figures of his debut novel, he was criticized for relying on well-trodden clichés.
