= Joely Fisher =

American actress (born 1967)

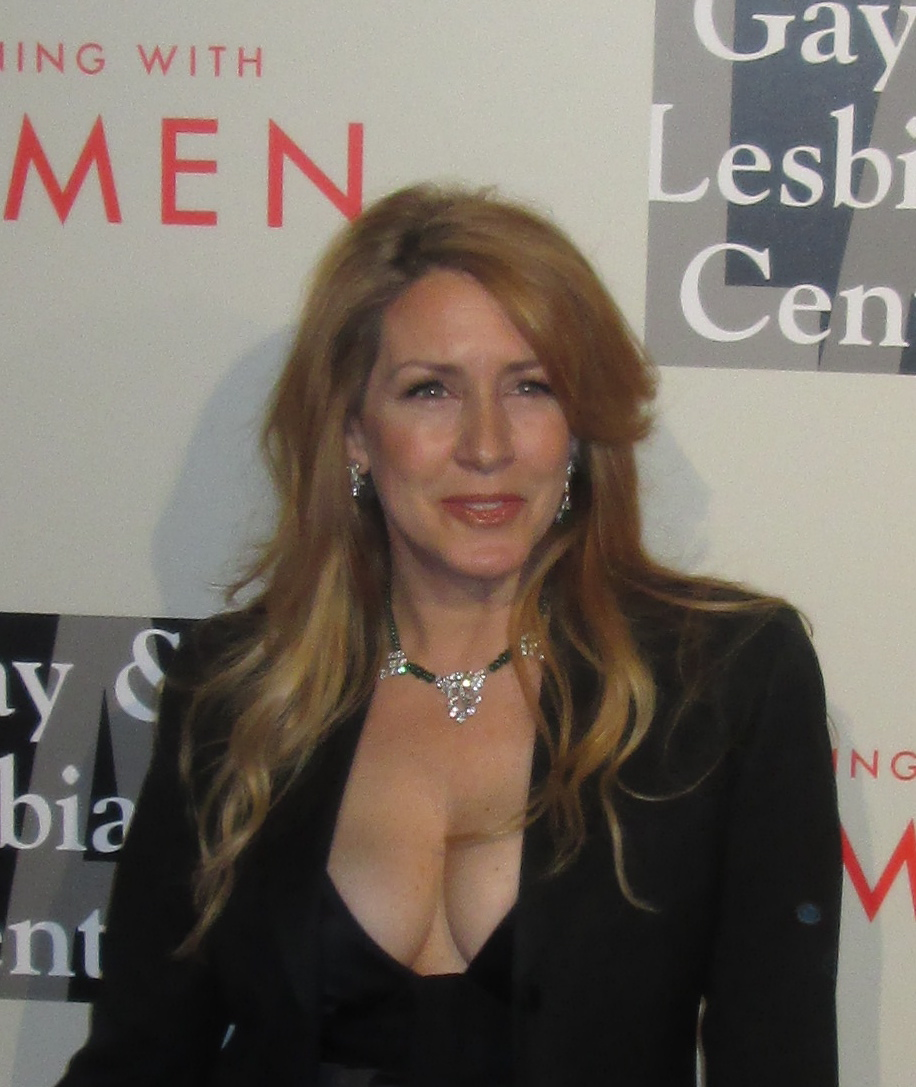
- Fisher in 2014
- Born: October 29, 1967 (age 59); Burbank, California, U.S.
- Education: Emerson College
- Occupations: Actress; singer; dancer; producer
- Years active: 1985–present
- Spouse: Christopher Duddy (m. 1996)
- Children: 3
- Parent(s): Eddie Fisher; Connie Stevens
- Relatives: Carrie Fisher (half-sister); Todd Fisher (half-brother); Tricia Leigh Fisher (sister); Billie Lourd (half-niece)

Joely Fisher (/ˈdʒoʊli/ JOH-lee; born October 29, 1967) is an American actress and singer, the daughter of singer Eddie Fisher and actress Connie Stevens, and half-sister of actress Carrie Fisher. Her breakthrough came in 1994, starring as Paige Clark in the ABC sitcom Ellen, for which she was nominated for a Golden Globe Award for Best Supporting Actress in a Series, Miniseries or Television Film at the 55th Golden Globe Awards. Fisher later starred in the 1999 comedy film Inspector Gadget and had leading roles in the Lifetime comedy-drama Wild Card (2003–2005), and Fox sitcom 'Til Death (2006–2010).

The national members of the trade union SAG-AFTRA elected Fisher as secretary-treasurer on September 2, 2021.

== Early life ==
Joely Fisher was born on October 29, 1967, in Burbank, California, one of two children born to Edwin "Eddie" Fisher and Connie Stevens (née Concetta Ingolia), both entertainers. Her father was Jewish, whose parents immigrated to the United States from the Russian Empire, whereas her mother was Catholic and of Ashkenazi Jewish, Irish, and Italian descent. Fisher has a younger sister, Tricia Leigh Fisher. Her parents divorced in 1969, after which she and Tricia were raised by Stevens. Her father married a total of five times, with Stevens as his third wife. Joely and Tricia Fisher had two older half-siblings, Carrie Fisher and Todd Fisher, from her father's first marriage, with Debbie Reynolds.

Joely Fisher and her sister Tricia toured the world with Stevens, attending different schools and learning from tutors. Fisher graduated from Beverly Hills High School, then attended Emerson College in Boston, as well as the University of Paris for one semester. In the summer of 1987, Fisher attended an acting retreat conducted in Italy by coach Sandra Seacat.

Fisher was named Miss Golden Globe at the 49th Golden Globe Awards in 1992.

== Career ==
Her first film role was Averil in the comedy Pretty Smart (1987), which starred her sister, Tricia. Fisher then played Kris Stone on the CBS Schoolbreak Special drama "Dedicated to the One I Love" (1991) opposite Danielle Ferland. Next came the feature I'll Do Anything (1994) starring Nick Nolte, which helped her career as bigger roles followed. She also had a variety of guest roles on series such as Growing Pains, Blossom, Caroline in the City, The Golden Palace, The Outer Limits, Grace Under Fire and Coach.

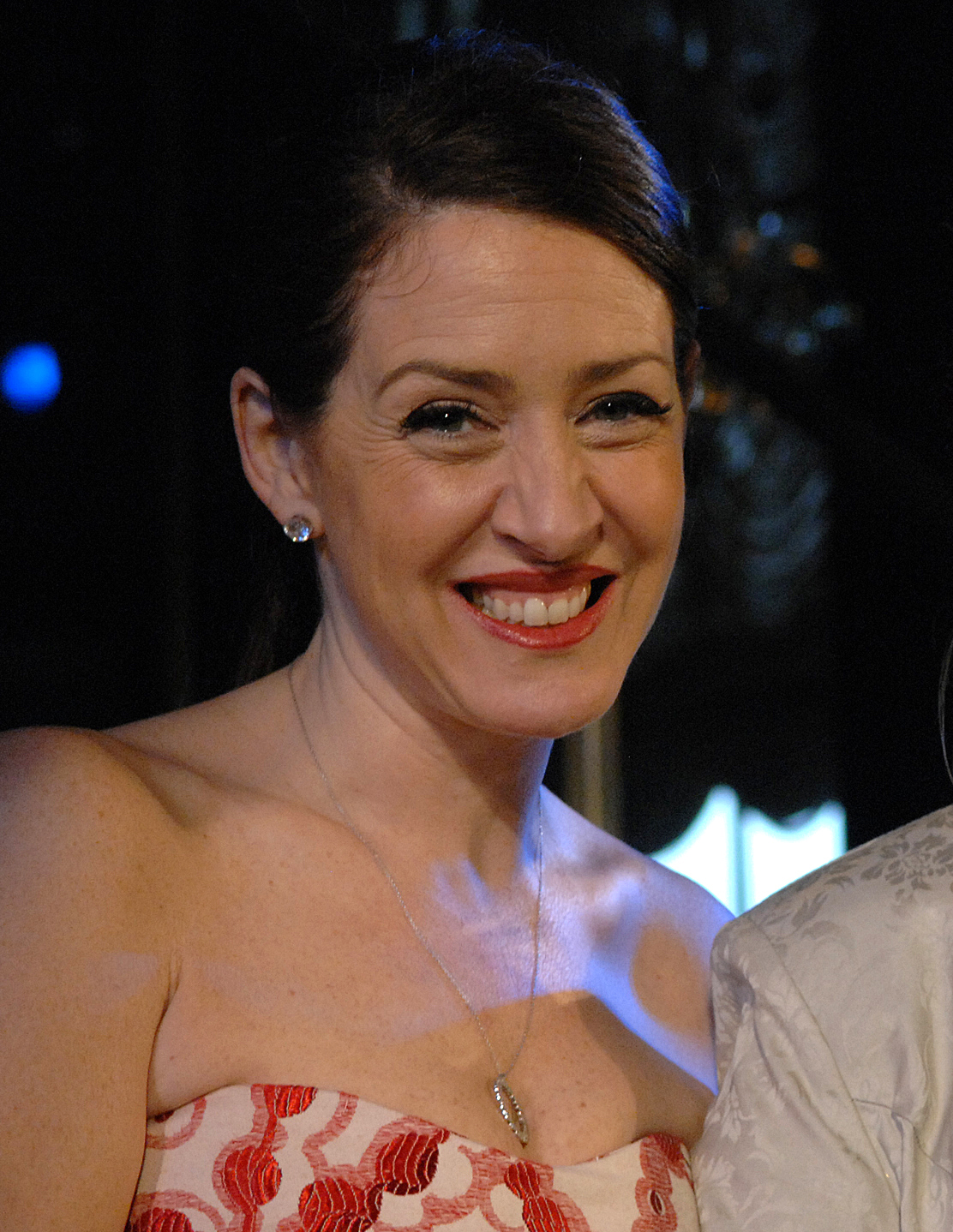
Fisher in November 2007

In 1994, Fisher was cast as Paige Clark on the sitcom Ellen, first appearing in the second season. She played the role for four seasons until the series ended in 1998. That same year, she earned a Golden Globe Award nomination for Best Supporting Actress – Series, Miniseries or Television Film at the 55th Golden Globe Awards. She followed Ellen with the role of Dr. Brenda Bradford in the film Inspector Gadget (1999).

Fisher's Broadway debut was as a replacement for the role of Betty Rizzo in the revival of Grease (1994). She was also a replacement for the role of Sally Bowles in the revival of Cabaret (1998). Her vocal range is alto.

Fisher's career in music not only landed her on Broadway but she was featured in albums. Her most noted album was Tradition: a Family at Christmas which she, her sister Tricia and their mother Connie Stevens sang various Christmas carols. She sang her own solo on "Grown Up Christmas List". Her vocals are also heard singing "One for My Baby" in Harold Arlen's album STAGE.

From 2003 until 2005, Fisher starred in the Lifetime network's drama series Wild Card as insurance investigator Zoe Busiek. After that, she had a recurring role as Lynette Scavo (Felicity Huffman)'s boss Nina Fletcher on Desperate Housewives. From 2006 until 2010, Fisher starred opposite actor Brad Garrett as Joy Stark in the Fox TV sitcom 'Til Death. In 2018, Fischer starred in A Shakespeare Jubilee! directed by Louis Fantasia at The Wallis in Beverly Hills.

In 2021, Fisher starred as Irene Cody in the Lifetime film Girl in the Basement which was inspired by the Fritzl case.

Fisher serves on the advisory board of Voters of Tomorrow, an advocacy organization that promotes political engagement among Generation Z.

== Personal life ==
Fisher married cinematographer Christopher Duddy in 1996. They have three daughters, two who were born in 2001 and 2006, and a third who was adopted in September 2008. She is also stepmother to Duddy's two sons, Cameron Duddy, who is the bass guitarist for the country music band Midland, (b. 1986) and Collin (b. 1988). As of at least 2004, the family lives in Los Angeles next to Fisher's sister Tricia, with whom she is close.

In late 2008, she became an artist ambassador for Save the Children. She traveled to Xai-Xai, Mozambique, to visit with children that are part of the child sponsorship programs.

== Filmography ==
=== Film ===
Year	Film	Role	Notes
1987	Pretty Smart	Averil	
1994	I'll Do Anything	Cathy Breslow (Female D Person)	
1994	The Mask	Maggie	
1994	Mixed Nuts	Susan	
1997	Family Plan	Lauren Osborne	
1999	Inspector Gadget	Dr. Brenda Bradford/Robo-Brenda	
2000	Nostradamus	Lucy Hudson	
2005	Slingshot	Emma	
2007	Cougar Club	Lulu	
2007	Murdering Mama's Boy	Claire	Short
2009	You	Kimberly	
2014	Happy Anniversary Honey	Jill	Short
2016	Search Engines	Judy	
2016	The Disappointments Room	Dr. Asher	
2017	The Tribes of Palos Verdes	Janet	
2018	By the Rivers of Babylon	Judith	
2019	Fall Girls	Simone Wellington	
2020	Looking for Mr. Wonderful	Barbara	
2021	The Disappearance of Mrs. Wu	Charlotte Kelly	
2024	Reagan/Quigley '85	Joan Quigley	Short
2025	Swiped	Sima	

=== Television ===
Year	TV show	Role	Notes
1989	Starting from Scratch	Sylvia	Episode: "Kate Leaves Home"
1989	Something Is Out There	Leanne Healy	Episode: "The Keeper"
1990	Growing Pains	Sally Garner	Guest cast (season 1-2)
1991	Blossom	Bambi	Episode: "Tough Love"
1991	CBS Schoolbreak Special	Kris Stone	Episode: "Dedicated to the One I Love"
1993	The Golden Palace	Paula Webb	Episode: "Runaways"
1994	ABC Weekend Specials	Princess Pamina (voice)	Episode: "The Magic Flute"
1994	The Companion	Stacy	TV movie
1994–98	Ellen	Paige Clark	Main cast (season 2-5)
1996	The Dana Carvey Show	Paige Clark	Episode: "The Mountain Dew Dana Carvey Show"
1996	Caroline in the City	Jill	Episode: "Caroline and the Ex-Wife"
1996	The Outer Limits	Amy	Episode: "Out of Body"
1996–98	Superman: The Animated Series	Lana Lang (voice)	Guest cast (season 1-3)
1997	Seduction in a Small Town	Sandy Barlow	TV movie
1997	Coach	Paige Clark	Episode: "Viva Las Ratings"
1997	Grace Under Fire	Paige Clark	Episode: "Vegas"
1997	The Drew Carey Show	Paige Clark	Episode: "Drew Gets Married"
1997	Jitters	Rita Domino	TV movie
1998	Perfect Prey	Elizabeth Crane	TV movie
1998	Thirst	Susan Miller	TV movie
1998	Genesis Awards	Herself/Host	Television special
1999	Love, American Style	Jeannie	Segment: "Love and The Heimlich Maneuver"
1999	Coming Unglued	Laura Hartwood	TV movie
1999	Kidnapped in Paradise	Beth Emerson	TV movie
2000	Mad TV	Herself	Episode #6.6
2000	Grosse Pointe	Hope Lustig	Recurring cast
2000	Normal, Ohio	Pamela Theresa Gamble-Miller	Main cast
2001	Danny	Molly	Main cast
2002	Hollywood Squares	Herself/Panelist	Episode: "May 1, 2002"
2002	Intimate Portrait	Herself	Episode: "Joely Fisher"
2002–03	Baby Bob	Lizzy Collins Spencer	Main cast
2003–05	Wild Card	Zoe Busiek	Main cast
2004	E! True Hollywood Story	Herself	Segment: "Ellen DeGeneres"
2005	Desperate Housewives	Nina Fletcher	Recurring cast (season 2)
2006	Jeopardy!	Herself	Episode: "2006 Celebrity Jeopardy! Game 8."
2006–10	'Til Death	Joy Stark	Main cast
2007	The Bronx Bunny Show	Herself	Episode #1.9
2008	E! True Hollywood Story	Herself	Segment: "Mariska Hargitay"
2009	Hollywood Lives	Herself	Recurring guest
2011	Celebrity Close Calls	Herself	Episode: "Peter Fonda/Joely Fisher/Annie Potts"
2011	Wizards of Waverly Place	Meg Robinson	Episode: "Alex the Puppetmaster"
2012	RuPaul's Drag U	Herself/Guest Professor	Episode: "Time to Grow Up"
2012	The Haunting of...	Herself	Episode: "Connie Stevens"
2012	Cupid, Inc.	Eve Lovett	TV movie
2014	Fatal Acquittal	Cassidy Miller	TV movie
2014–15	Celebrity Name Game	Herself/Celebrity Player	Recurring guest
2014–16	Last Man Standing	Wendi	Guest (season 3), recurring cast (season 4-5)
2016	Hollywood Game Night	Herself/Celebrity Player	Episode: "It's My Jane in the Box"
2016	Celebrity Family Feud	Herself	Episode #3.4
2016	Scorpion	Lorraine	Episode: "The Fast and the Nerdiest"
2016	Modern Family	Maggie Braithwaite	Episode: "The Alliance"
2017	Battle of the Network Stars	Herself/Contestant	Episode: "ABC Stars vs. Variety"
2018	The '80s Greatest	Herself	Recurring guest
2018	The '90s Greatest	Herself	Recurring guest
2018	Station 19	Denise	Episode: "No Recovery"
2019	9-1-1	Cynn	Episode: "Triggers"
2019–20	The Very Very Best of the 70s	Herself	Recurring cast (season 1), guest (season 2)
2021	Girl in the Basement	Irene Cody	TV movie
2022	The Very Very Best of the 80s	Herself	Episode: "Action Movie Stars"
2022	How I Met Your Father	Sue	Episode: "Jay Street"
2023	Dark Side of Comedy	Herself	Episode: "Ellen DeGeneres"
2023	Fantasy Island	Joy Summers	Episode: "The Urn"
2024	S.W.A.T.	Caroline Wolf	Episode: "Allegiance"

Theater
Year	Production	Role	Notes
1994	Grease	Betty Rizzo	
1998	Cabaret	Sally Bowles	

== Discography ==
- 1993: Tradition: A Family at Christmas; she sang 3 songs with her mother Connie Stevens and sister Tricia Leigh Fisher. She has 1 solo: "Grown Up Christmas List"
- 1995: S.T.A.G.E. Music of Harold Arlen, "One for My Baby"
- 1998: Lerner, Lowe, Lane and Friends, "Come Back to Me"
- 2000: Adler, Brock, and Coleman, "Welcome to Holiday Inn"
