= Carrie Fisher filmography =

Carrie Fisher was an American actress and writer. During her almost five-decade-long career, she had appearances in over 50 films, as well as various television series, documentaries, late night talk shows, video games, and commercials. Her credits also include writing novels, screenplays, and television specials and series episodes.

In 1959, Fisher was cast as a "little girl" in the documentary A Visit with Debbie Reynolds. She was cast as "girl scout" in Debbie Reynolds and the Sound of Children (1969) and as Lorna Karpf in Shampoo (1975). Fisher's breakout role was Princess Leia Organa in 1977's Star Wars alongside Mark Hamill (as Luke Skywalker) and Harrison Ford (as Han Solo). The Star Wars franchise garnered Fisher with five film award nominations with one turning into a win in 2018—Choice Fantasy Actress for Star Wars: The Last Jedi.

Fisher wrote a semi-autobiographical novel, Postcards from the Edge (1987), which was later adapted for film with the same name (1990). She also wrote the book Wishful Drinking (2008) and a memoir The Princess Diarist (2016), among other books, screenplays, and plays.

== Film ==
Year	Title	Role	Notes	Ref(s)
1975	Shampoo	Lorna Karpf		
1977	Star Wars	Princess Leia Organa		
1980	The Empire Strikes Back	Princess Leia Organa		
1980	The Blues Brothers	Mystery Woman		
1981	Under the Rainbow	Annie Clark		
1983	Return of the Jedi	Princess Leia Organa		
1984	Garbo Talks	Lisa Rolfe		
1985	The Man with One Red Shoe	Paula		
1986	Hannah and Her Sisters	April		
1986	Hollywood Vice Squad	Betty Melton		
1987	Amazon Women on the Moon	Mary Brown	Segment: "Reckless Youth"	
1987	The Time Guardian	Petra		
1988	Appointment with Death	Nadine Boynton		
1989	The 'Burbs	Carol Peterson		
1989	Loverboy	Monica Delancy		
1989	She's Back	Beatrice		
1989	When Harry Met Sally...	Marie		
1990	Sweet Revenge	Linda		
1990	Sibling Rivalry	Iris Turner-Hunter		
1990	Postcards from the Edge	—N/a	Screenwriter, based on her novel	
1991	Drop Dead Fred	Janie		
1991	Soapdish	Betsy Faye Sharon		
1991	Hook	Woman kissing on bridge	Uncredited	
1992	This Is My Life	Claudia Curtis		
1993	Last Action Hero	—N/a	Screenwriter, uncredited	
1997	Austin Powers: International Man of Mystery	Therapist	Uncredited cameo	
2000	Scream 3	Bianca	Cameo	
2000	Lisa Picard Is Famous	Herself	Cameo	
2001	Heartbreakers	Ms. Surpin		
2001	Jay and Silent Bob Strike Back	Nun	Cameo	
2002	A Midsummer Night's Rave	Mia's Mom	Cameo	
2002	The Rutles 2: Can't Buy Me Lunch	Herself (as Interviewee)		
2003	Charlie's Angels: Full Throttle	Mother Superior	Cameo	
2003	Wonderland	Sally Hansen		
2004	Stateside	Mrs. Dubois		
2005	Undiscovered	Carrie		
2005	The Aristocrats	Herself	Documentary	
2006	The Wubbulous LIVE	Alexis La Sound		
2007	Suffering Man's Charity	Reporter	Cameo	
2007	Cougar Club	Glady Goodbey		
2008	The Women	Bailey Smith		
2009	White Lightnin'	Cilla		
2009	Fanboys	Doctor	Cameo	
2009	Sorority Row	Mrs. Crenshaw		
2010	Wishful Drinking	Herself	Documentary	
2014	Maps to the Stars	Herself	Cameo	
2015	Star Wars: The Force Awakens	General Leia Organa		
2016	Bright Lights: Starring Carrie Fisher and Debbie Reynolds	Herself	Documentary	
2017	Star Wars: The Last Jedi	General Leia Organa	Posthumous release; Dedicated to her memory	
2019	Star Wars: The Rise of Skywalker	General Leia Organa	Repurposed archive footage; Posthumous release	
2020	Have a Good Trip: Adventures in Psychedelics	Herself	Documentary; Posthumous release	
2023	Wonderwell	Hazel	Posthumous release; Filmed in 2016; Final film role	

== Television ==
Year	Title	Role	Notes	Ref(s)
1959	A Visit with Debbie Reynolds	Little girl	Uncredited	
1969	Debbie Reynolds and the Sound of Children	Girl Scout	Television film	
1970	Life with Linkletter	Herself	Episode: "Debbie Reynolds, Carrie Fisher, Todd Fisher, Mark Russell"	
1977	Come Back, Little Sheba	Marie	Television film	
1977–2016	Today	Herself	Guest; guest co-anchor; 5 episodes	
1978	Ringo	Marquine	Television film	
1978	Leave Yesterday Behind	Marnie Clarkson	Television film	
1978	Saturday Night Live	Herself / Host	2 episodes	
1978	Star Wars Holiday Special	Princess Leia Organa	Special	
1980	Saturday Night Live	Leprechaun	Uncredited; episode: "Paul Simon, James Taylor & David Sanborn"	
1982	Laverne & Shirley	Cathy	Episode: "The Playboy Show"	
1983	Classic Creatures: Return of the Jedi	Herself	Host & narrator; television film documentary	
1983	From Star Wars to Jedi: The Making of a Saga	Herself	Television film documentary	
1983–1990	Late Night with David Letterman	Herself	Guest; 4 episodes	
1984	Faerie Tale Theatre	Thumbelina	Episode: "Thumbelina"	
1984	Frankenstein	Elizabeth	Television film	
1985	Happily Ever After	Alice Conway (voice)	Television film	
1985	From Here to Maternity	Veronica	Television short	
1985	George Burns Comedy Week	Mitzi	Episode: "The Couch"	
1985	A Girl Named Alida	Alice Conway (voice)	Television film	
1986	Liberty	Emma Lazarus	Television film	
1986	Sunday Drive	Franny Jessup	Television film	
1987	Amazing Stories	Laurie McNamara	Episode: "Gershwin's Trunk"	
1988–2015	Good Morning America	Herself	Guest; 2 episodes	
1989	Alida's Problem	Alice Conway (voice)	Television film	
1989	Trying Times	Enid	Episode: "Hunger Chic"	
1990	Sweet Revenge	Linda	Television film	
1991	Wogan	Herself	Guest; episode: "#11.11"	
1991	Movie Memories with Debbie Reynolds	Herself		
1991	Saturday Night Clive	Herself	Episode: "#4.3"	
1991–1996	Showbiz Today	Herself	3 episodes	
1993	The Young Indiana Jones Chronicles	—N/a	Co-wrote episode: "Paris, October 1916"	
1994	Clive Anderson Talks Back	Herself	Guest; episode: "#9.12"	
1994	Science Fiction: A Journey Into the Unknown	Herself	Television film documentary	
1994–1998	The Tonight Show with Jay Leno	Herself	Guest; 3 episodes	
1994–2009	Late Night with Conan O'Brien	Herself	Guest; 3 episodes	
1995	Frasier	Phyllis (voice)	Episode: "She's the Boss"	
1995	Present Tense, Past Perfect	Laurie	Television short	
1995	Ellen	Herself	Episode: "The Movie Show"	
1997	Gun	Nancy	Episode: "The Hole"	
1997	Roseanne	—N/a	Writer; episode: "Arsenic and Old Mom"	
1997–1999	Ruby	Herself	7 episodes	
1998	Dr. Katz, Professional Therapist	Roz Katz (voice)	Episode: "Thanksgiving"	
1998–2003	Intimate Portrait	Herself	4 episodes	
1999	It's Like, You Know...	Herself	Episode: "Arthur 2: On The Rocks"	
1999–2000	So Graham Norton	Herself	Guest; 2 episodes	
2000	Sex and the City	Herself	Episode: "Sex and Another City"	
2000–2010	Biography	Herself	Guest; 3 episodes	
2001	These Old Broads	Hooker	Television film; also writer and co-executive producer	
2002	A Nero Wolfe Mystery	Ellen Tenzer	Episode: "Motherhunt"	
2002–2004	Conversations from the Edge with Carrie Fisher	Herself	Host; 4 episodes	
2003	Good Morning, Miami	Judy Silver	Episode: "A Kiss Before Lying"	
2003–2004	Dinner for Five	Herself	Special guest; 2 episodes	
2004	Jack & Bobby	Madison Skutcher	Episode: "The First Lady"	
2004	The Rutles 2: Can't Buy Me Lunch	Herself	Interviewee; television film	
2005	Smallville	Pauline Kahn	Episode: "Thirst"	
2005	Romancing the Bride	Edwina	Television film	
2005–2014	The Late Late Show with Craig Ferguson	Herself	Guest; 14 episodes	
2005–2016	The Ellen DeGeneres Show	Herself	Guest; 4 episodes	
2005–2017	Family Guy	Angela (voice)	25 episodes	
2006	Friendly Fire	Chanteuse	Television film	
2007	Odd Job Jack	Dr. Finch	Episode: "The Beauty Beast"	
2007	Weeds	Celia's attorney	Episode: "The Brick Dance"	
2007	On the Lot	Herself (judge)	11 episodes	
2007	Side Order of Life	Dr. Gilbert	Episode: "Funeral for a Phone"	
2007	30 Rock	Rosemary Howard	Episode: "Rosemary's Baby"	
2008	Robot Chicken: Star Wars Episode II	Princess Leia Organa / Additional voices	Television special	
2008	Bring Back ... Star Wars	Herself	Documentary	
2009	The Bonnie Hunt Show	Herself	Guest; 1 episode	
2009	Celebrity Ghost Stories	Herself	Episode: "Carrie Fisher/John Waters/Rue McClanahan/Federico Castelluccio"	
2009	Charlie Rose	Herself	Guest; 1 episode	
2009	Late Night with Jimmy Fallon	Herself	Guest; 1 episode	
2010	Entourage	Anna Fowler	Episode: "Tequila and Coke"	
2010	Wright vs. Wrong	Joan Harrington	Pilot	
2012	Comedy Central Roast of Roseanne	Herself (roaster)	Television special	
2012	It's Christmas, Carol!	Eve	Television film	
2014	The Big Bang Theory	Herself	Episode: "The Convention Conundrum"	
2014	Legit	Angela McKinnon	Episode: "Licked"	
2014–2016	Girlfriends' Guide to Divorce	Cat	2 episodes	
2015	Jimmy Kimmel Live!	Herself	Guest; episode: "The Cast of Star Wars: The Force Awakens"	
2015	Crackanory	Herself	Storyteller; episode: "Uncivil War & Dread and Breakfast"	
2015–2017	Catastrophe	Mia Norris	5 episodes	
2017	Urban Myths	Herself	Episode: "Elizabeth, Michael and Marlon"	

== Video games ==
Year	Title	Role	Notes	Ref(s)
2012	Dishonored	Female Broadcaster (voice)		
2014	Family Guy: The Quest for Stuff	Angela (voice)	Mobile game	
2016	Lego Star Wars: The Force Awakens	Princess Leia (voice)		

== See also ==
- Carrie Fisher awards and nominations
