= Joshua Ravetch =

American dramatist

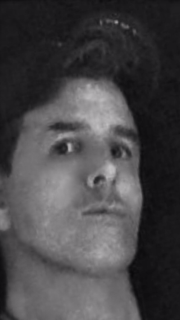
- Born: Los Angeles, California, US
- Occupations: Playwright, screenwriter, and stage director
- Notable work: Chasing Mem'ries: A Different Kind of Musical

Joshua Ravetch is an American playwright, screenwriter and stage director born in Los Angeles, California, who co-created and directed Carrie Fisher's one-woman show Wishful Drinking, which had a successful run on Broadway. He also co-wrote and directed Dick Van Dyke in his first-ever one-man show Step in Time! A Musical Memoir, which premiered at the Geffen Playhouse.

== Career ==
Ravetch's award-winning play Chasing Mem'ries: A Different Kind of Musical received the Edgerton New Play Award and was nominated for the Ovation. The play starred Tony Award Winner, Tyne Daly and Academy Award, nominated Robert Forster. It world premiered at the Geffen Playhouse in 2017. Ravetch collaborated with lyricists Alan and Marilyn Bergman with music by Marvin Hamlisch, Michel Legrand and Johnny Mandel. It is the first of three plays in the Chasing Mem'ries cycle. The second received a workshop production in 2020.

In 2024 Ravetch collaborated with Harvard Astrophysicist, Dr. Avi Loeb, on the first workshop of a play about space, time, the possibility of life on other planets, and the interstellar object, 'Oumuamua, the first object found traveling through our solar system from interstellar space. Loeb pointed out that it behaved in ways that were not consistent with known physics involving its shape and acceleration away from the sun. The play addresses this moment as telescopes such as the JWST, the Nancy Grace Roman (which launched on August 30, 2026), and the Vera Rubin are going online.

In 2020, Ravetch's play One November Yankee began its life at the NoHo Arts Theatre in a workshop production starring Academy nominated, Robert Forster and M*A*S*H's own Hot Lips Houlihan, Loretta Swit . The play moved Off-Broadway to 59E59 just as Covid hit, starring Harry Hamlin and Stefanie Powers. The play won the ten play competition at The Delaware Theater Company. The play was unusual in that the set was an actual full-sized crashed Piper J3 Cub. It becomes a character in the play. One review called the play,"Magnificent theatrical origami."

Ravetch also wrote and directed a workshop production of The Astronomer that was performed at The Pasadena Playhouse with Academy Award winner Shirley Jones in the title role (after an initial reading at the NoHo Arts Center Theatre). The play takes place entirely at the top of a mountain in an obseervatory dome with the telescope slashing across the stage. The play came on the heels of the whimsical project Ravetch co-wrote with stage and screen icon Dick Van Dyke, Step in Time! A Musical Memoir. Ravetch directed the world premiere production at the Geffen Playhouse, with Van Dyke starring and actually danced "Me 'Ole Bamboo" from Chitty Chitty Bang Bang.

Ravetch is perhaps best known for having collaborated with actress/writer Carrie Fisher, and co-creating and directing her in Wishful Drinking, Fisher's one-woman-show at Los Angeles' Geffen Playhouse. The show enjoyed an extended run on Broadway at Studio 54 and was adapted into a special for HBO. The pair were working on the sequel, Wishful Drinking Strikes Back at the time of her passing.

Also at the Geffen Playhouse, Ravetch wrote and directed a workshop production of Writer's Cramp with Oscar nominee Robert Forster, Emmy winner and Tony nominee Holland Taylor, and Tony nominee Douglas Sills. Other writing credits include Periscope Up a play in one act that was performed at the NoHo Arts Theatre and was directed by Star Trek veteran Jonathan Frakes.

In 2023, Ravetch's play Our American Sons was workshopped at the Delaware Theatre Company. It was a project conceived during the Covid pandemic, tracking the true-life stories of gay and trans kids who have been put through the utterly damaging and traumatic atrocity known as conversion therapy, a practice slowly being outlawed throughout the USA.

Ravetch also co-wrote and directed Beverly Johnson: IN VOGUE, which workshopped in Palm Springs in 2023 and opened Off-Broadway in January 2024. That date coincided with the fiftieth anniversary of the famous ground-breaking Vogue cover where Beverly Johnson became the first ever black woman to grace the cover of American Vogue. She was nominated for the Adelco.

In 2021, Ravetch and Hamlin joined forces again in his one-man show, Icarus, the Sun and the Limelight revealing the unlikely journey of an actor who loved Shakespeare, through his long running role on L.A. Law, to relationships and marriages to Ursula Andres, Nicolette Sheridan and Lisa Rinna. Hamlin started a fusion energy company (TAE) that is one of the leading private companies on the way to clean, renewable, cheap energy. The company that Hamlin started while being featured as People Magazine's Sexiest Man Alive is valued at more than 6 billion dollars.

In 2018, Ice Skating legend, Dorothy Hamill, joined pair skaters, Tai Babilonia and Randy Gardner in a tour of "Go Figure: The Randy Gardner Story". Ravetch co-wrote and directed the play that followed the trio in extraordinary experiences in the world of the winter Olympics at a time when Russia and the U.S. were very public Olympic rivals. The three tell their own stories as we discover that Dorothy Hamill's mother missed her Gold Medal Performance to watch a soap opera back at the Olympic village and Randy passed a note from Oleg Protopopov under the noses of the watchful eyes of the KGB to Dick Button who staged a competition to allow the Protopopov's to defect.

In 2015, Ravetch adapted long-distance swimmer, Diana Nyad in the play, "Onward: The Diana Nyad Story." The play began its run in North Hollywood CA, before moving to Key West Florida where it played at the Studios of Key West, just a mile from where Nyad made landfall after her historic 111 hour swim from Cuba to Florida.

Ravetch's other playwriting credits include his first play Girders, which he also directed and which enjoyed an extended run at Los Angeles' Coast Playhouse, first starring Robert Forster and then George Murdock, produced by Evan Greene. It was optioned by Barbara Broccoli (James Bond) and her husband Fred Zollo. Based on the famous photograph of men at lunch on a girder while building Radio City Music Hall, it was literally that photograph come to life as the men who are building the future of this country are the very men the men the country has forgotten. Forster also starred in workshop productions of Ravetch's plays Off Sides with Olympia Dukakis and Beacon with Brooke Shields and Kerr Smith.

Ravetch also directed Clifford Odets' The Big Knife; Thomas Babe's Prayer For My Daughter; John Patrick's Hasty Heart, and Ira Levin's Deathtrap, which garnered five Drama-Logue Awards, including awards for Director and Production.

Ravetch's other plays include The Light Bulb with Hart to Hart's Stefanie Powers in the workshop production, before its world premiere launch at the NoHo Arts Center. He also co-wrote One From the Hart, Powers' one-woman show that opened at the Orange County Performing Arts Centre. Also at The Coast Playhouse, Ravetch directed Bart Baker's play, Love Acts, with actress/supermodel Beverly Johnson. Johnson was nominated for the NAACP Image Award for her performance.

Ravetch's television credits include CBS' Joan of Arcadia, Titan for TNT, Horseshoe Bay for Warner Brothers, and Yesterday for Laura Ziskin Productions.

=== Stage ===
Year	Title	Position	Notes
2025	Are We Alone?	Writer/Director	Workshop Production / Cambridge, Mass. Dr. Avi Loeb/Head of Harvard Astrophysics. Featuring Dr. Avi Loeb; former science partner: Dr. Stephen Hawking / Opening in 2027
2024	Icarus, the Sun and the Limelight	Writer/Director	Delaware Theatre Company / starring Harry Hamlin in his show about an actor who starts a fusion company now valued at 6 billion dollars.
2024	Beverly Johnson: IN VOGUE	Writer/Director	59E59, Off-Broadway
2023	Our American Sons	Writer/Director	Delaware Theatre Company
2021	Chasing More Mem'ries; Another Kind of Musical (second in the Chasing Mem'ries cycle)	Writer/Director	Lyricists, Alan & Marilyn Bergman collaborating.
2020	One November Yankee	Writer/Director	59e59th Street Theatre, Off Broadway, New York, NY
2019	One November Yankee	Writer/Director	Delaware Theatre Company starring Harry Hamlin and Stefanie Powers: Preproduction
2019	Beverly Johnson: Naked!	Writer/Director	West Hollywood Library Theatre: Workshop production starring supermodel Beverly Johnson
2017	Chasing Mem'ries: A Different Kind of Musical	Writer/Director	The Geffen Playhouse, starring Tyne Daly and Robert Forster. Recipient of the Edgerton New Play Award.
2016	Wishful Drinking Strikes Back	Co-Creator/Director	The Geffen Playhouse Commission to star Carrie Fisher (never performed).
2016	Go Figure: The Randy Gardner Story	Writer/Director	Starring Olympic Champions Randy Gardner with Dorothy Hamill and Tai Babilonia at the NoHo Arts Center in Los Angeles and the Delaware Theatre Company in Wilmington, Delaware (2018). Became documentary in 2019.
2015	Onward: The Diana Nyad Story	Co-Writer/Director	Starring Diana Nyad. Became feature film with Anette Benning and Jodie Foster in 2023.
2014	One November Yankee	Writer/Director	Starring Loretta Swit and Harry Hamlin.
2013	The Light Bulb	Writer	NoHo Arts Center
2012	Periscope Up	Writer	Directed by Jonathan Frakes.
2011	Step in Time: A Musical Memoir	Writer/Director	The Geffen Playhouse, starring Dick Van Dyke.
2010	The Astronomer	Writer/Director	Pasadena Playhouse, starring Shirley Jones.
2009	Writer's Cramp	Writer/Director	The Geffen Playhouse: Workshop Production, starring Holland Taylor, Robert Forster, Douglas Sill The Shubert Organization is considering for a Broadway run,
2008	Beacon	Writer/ Director	Egyptian Arena Theatre: Workshop Production, starring Holland Taylor, Brooke Shields, Robert Forster, Kerr Smith.
2007	Off Sides	Writer/Director	Egyptian Arena Theatre: Workshop Production, starring Olympia Dukakis and Robert Forster. Miramax and PBS engaged in a bidding war for the play to become a movie.
2006	Wishful Drinking	Co-Creator /Director	The Geffen Playhouse, starring Carrie Fisher
2006	One From the Hart	Director	Orange County Performing Arts Center, starring Stefanie Powers
2002	The Seagull	Director	Egyptian Arena Theatre
2000	Deathtrap	Director	Stella Adler Theatre
1998	The Hasty Heart	Director	Glendale Centre Theatre
1996	Girders	Writer/Director	The Coast Playhouse / Optioned for a Broadway run and feature.
1995	The Big Knife	Director	Stella Adler Theatre, starring Robert Forster
1994	A Prayer for my Daughter	Director	The Complex
1993	Love Acts	Director	The Coast Playhouse / written by Bart Baker starring Beverly Johnson
