= Surrender the Pink =

1990 novel by Carrie Fisher

- First edition cover
- Author: Carrie Fisher
- Language: English
- Genre: Romance novel
- Publisher: Simon & Schuster
- Publication date: August 1990
- Publication place: United States
- Media type: Print (Hardback & Paperback)
- ISBN: 0-671-66640-1 (hardback edition)
- OCLC: 21524190
- Dewey Decimal: 813/.54 20
- LC Class: PS3556.I8115 S87 1990
- Preceded by: Postcards from the Edge (1987)
- Followed by: Delusions of Grandma (1994)

Surrender the Pink is a romance novel by actress and author Carrie Fisher that was published in 1990.

This novel, like most of Fisher's books, is semi-autobiographical and fictionalizes events from her real life. It is said to be loosely based on her short marriage to musician Paul Simon.

== Plot summary ==
Surrender the Pink is a story about screenwriter Dinah Kaufman. Although Dinah is successful at her job, she is a failure in her relationships with men. She then meets someone she believes to be the man of her dreams, Rudy Gendler.

Rudy is successful and sophisticated, and he asks her to marry him. She soon discovers, however, that he is not what she believed him to be and their marriage falls apart. Dinah then realizes that she still loves Rudy and wants him back.

== Other media ==
In Mad About You, Season 1 Episode 9, which is entitled “Riding Backwards," Helen Hunt’s character Jamie Buckman reads this book on the train.
