= Hollywood Moms =

2001 photo-book by Joyce Ostin

- Author: Joyce Ostin
- Language: English
- Genre: Photobook
- Publication date: 2001

Hollywood Moms is a 2001 photo-book by Joyce Ostin with an introduction written by Carrie Fisher.
