= Shockaholic =

2011 autobiographical humor book by Carrie Fisher

- Author: Carrie Fisher
- Audio read by: Carrie Fisher
- Language: English
- Genre: Humor; Autobiography
- Publisher: Simon & Schuster
- Publication date: November 1, 2011
- Publication place: United States
- Media type: Print (hardback)
- Pages: 176 (hardback edition)
- ISBN: 978-0743264822 (hardback edition)
- Preceded by: Wishful Drinking
- Followed by: The Princess Diarist

Shockaholic is a 2011 book by Carrie Fisher.

== Reception ==
The Guardian's Peter Conrad said, "Carrie Fisher's wisecracks and waspish rants fail to mask her Hollywood self-regard." Martin Chilton of The Daily Telegraph said the book is "funny in patches but lacks overall the jaunty warmth that Fisher brings to her performances. Still, it does contain wisdom for a modern, mad world". Will Durst of the San Francisco Chronicle wrote, "Fisher's wordplay is wicked, relentless and as playful as a bouncy house full of polar bear cubs." The A.V. Club's Tasha Robinson wrote, "Shockaholic is often funny, though more often in random, scattered asides than when Fisher actually sets out to pile on the jokes."
