= Carrie Fisher =

American actress and writer (1956–2016)

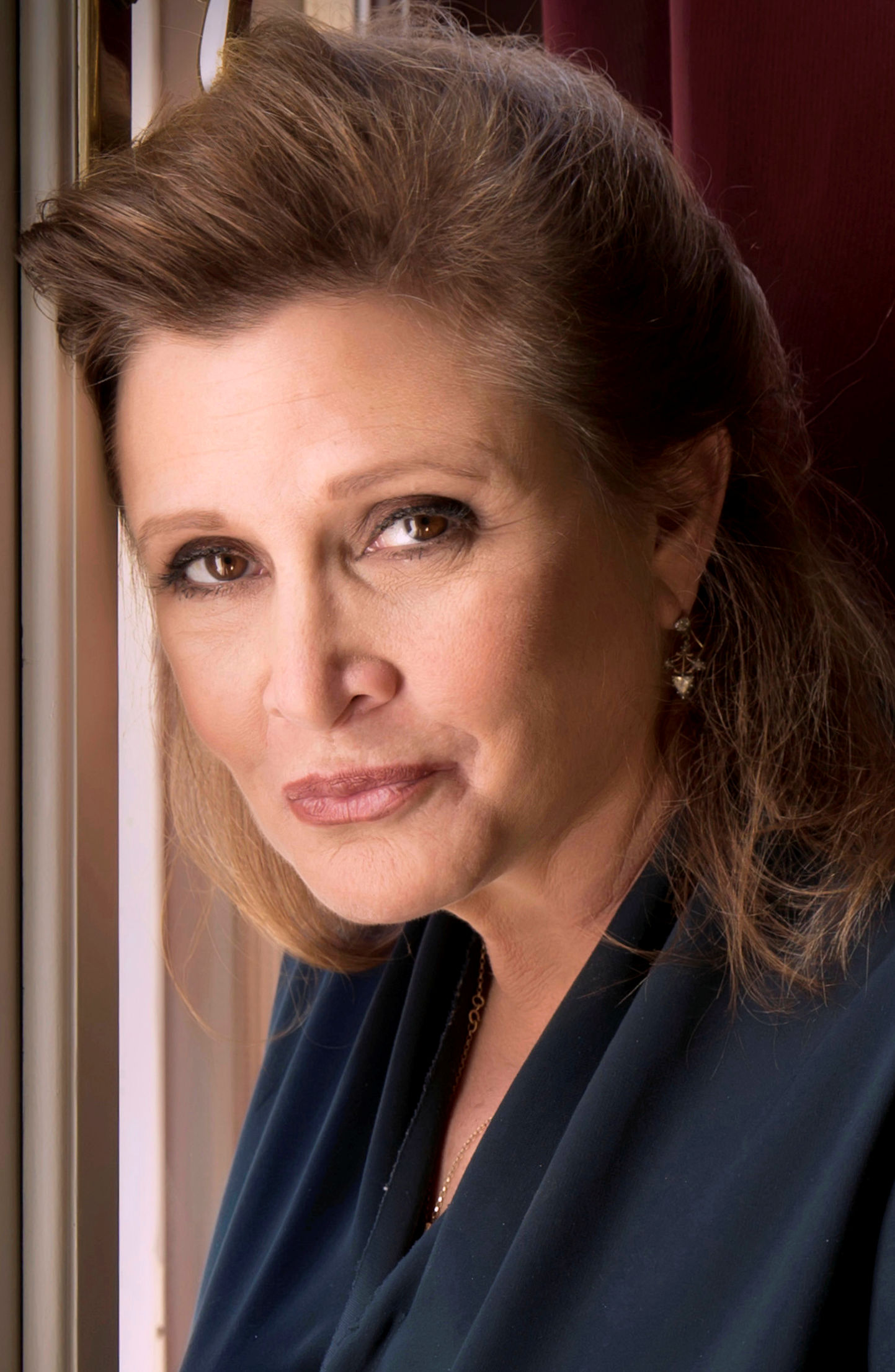
- Fisher in 2013
- Born: Carrie Frances Fisher; October 21, 1956; Burbank, California, U.S.
- Died: December 27, 2016 (aged 60); Los Angeles, California, U.S.
- Occupations: Actress; writer
- Years active: 1975–2016
- Works: Full list
- Spouse: Paul Simon (m. 1983; div. 1984)
- Partner: Bryan Lourd (1990–1993)
- Children: Billie Lourd
- Parents: Eddie Fisher; Debbie Reynolds
- Relatives: Todd Fisher (brother); Joely Fisher (half-sister); Tricia Leigh Fisher (half-sister)
- Website: carriefisher.com

Carrie Frances Fisher (October 21, 1956 – December 27, 2016) was an American actress and writer. She was best known for starring as Princess Leia in the original Star Wars films (1977–1983) and reprised the role in The Force Awakens (2015), The Last Jedi (2017)—a posthumous release that was dedicated to her—and The Rise of Skywalker (2019), the latter using unreleased footage from The Force Awakens. Her other film credits include Shampoo (1975), The Blues Brothers (1980), Hannah and Her Sisters (1986), The 'Burbs (1989), When Harry Met Sally... (1989), Soapdish (1991), and The Women (2008). She was nominated twice for the Primetime Emmy Award for Outstanding Guest Actress in a Comedy Series for her performances in the NBC sitcom 30 Rock (2007) and the Channel 4 series Catastrophe (2017).

Fisher wrote several semi-autobiographical novels, including Postcards from the Edge, and a nonfiction book, Wishful Drinking, based on her autobiographical one-woman play. She wrote the screenplay for the film version of Postcards from the Edge which garnered her a nomination for the BAFTA Award for Best Adapted Screenplay, and her one-woman stage show of Wishful Drinking received a nomination for the Primetime Emmy Award for Outstanding Variety, Music or Comedy Special. She worked on other writers' screenplays as a script doctor, including tightening the scripts for Hook (1991), Sister Act (1992), The Wedding Singer (1998), and many of the films from the Star Wars franchise, among others. An Entertainment Weekly article from May 1992 described Fisher as "one of the most sought-after doctors in town."

Fisher was the daughter of singer Eddie Fisher and actress Debbie Reynolds. She and her mother appear together in Bright Lights: Starring Carrie Fisher and Debbie Reynolds, a documentary about their relationship. It premiered at the 2016 Cannes Film Festival. She earned praise for speaking publicly about her experiences with bipolar disorder and drug addiction. Fisher died of a sudden cardiac arrest in December 2016, at age 60, four days after experiencing a medical emergency during a transatlantic flight from London to Los Angeles. She was posthumously made a Disney Legend in 2017, and was awarded a posthumous Grammy Award for Best Spoken Word Album the following year. In 2023, she posthumously received a star on the Hollywood Walk of Fame.

== Early life ==
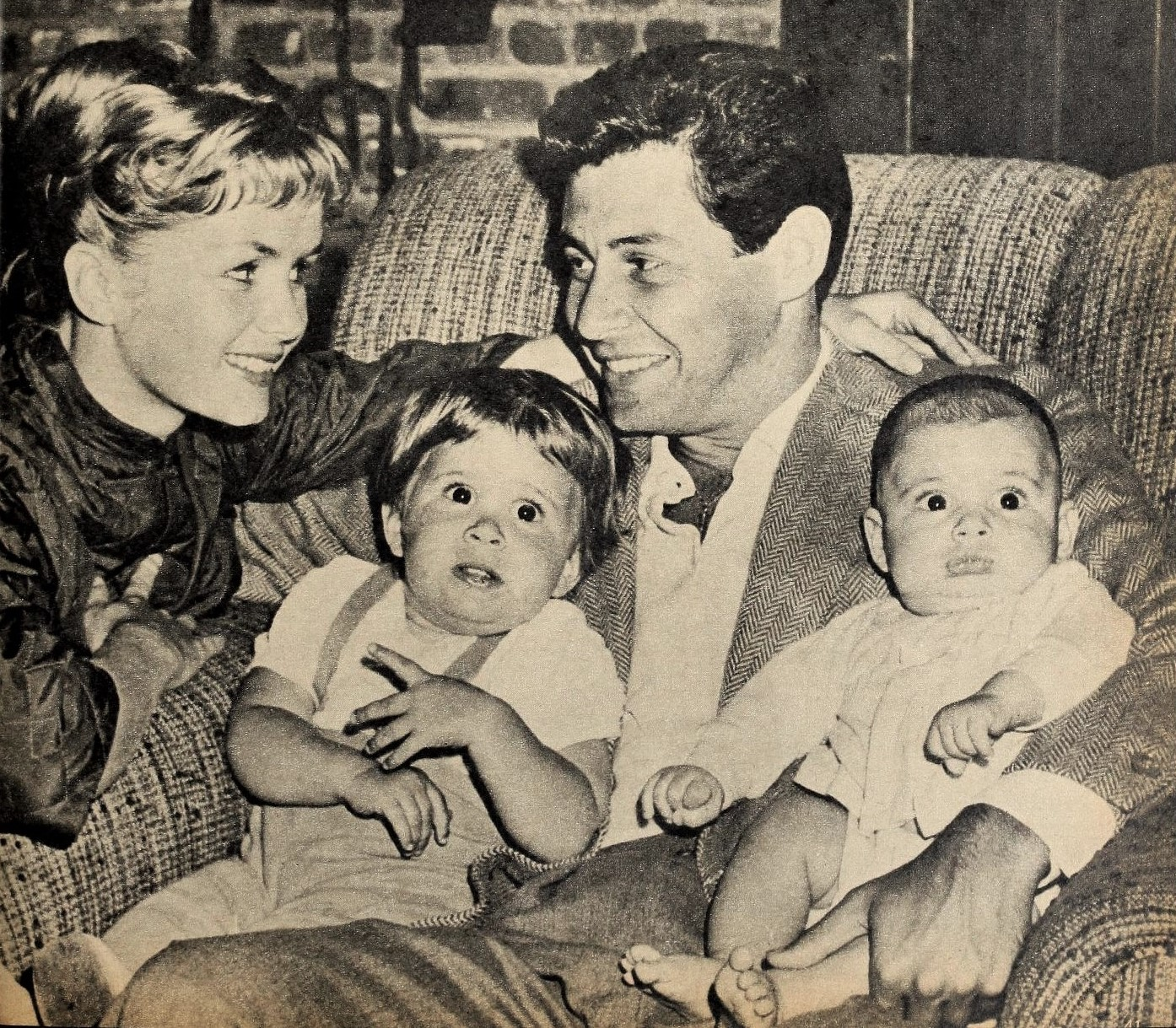
Fisher with her parents and brother in a photo taken for an issue of Modern Screen, 1958

Carrie Frances Fisher was born on October 21, 1956, at Providence Saint Joseph Medical Center in Burbank, California, to actress Debbie Reynolds and singer Eddie Fisher. Fisher's paternal grandparents were Russian-Jewish immigrants, while her mother, who was raised a Nazarene, was of English and Scots-Irish descent.

Fisher was two years old when her parents divorced in 1959 after it was revealed, shortly following the death of Elizabeth Taylor's husband, Mike Todd, that Eddie Fisher had been having an affair with her. Eddie Fisher and Taylor married that same year and divorced in 1964. Her father's third marriage, to actress Connie Stevens, resulted in the births of Fisher's two half-sisters, Joely Fisher and Tricia Leigh Fisher. In 1960, her mother married Harry Karl, owner of a chain of shoe stores. Reynolds and Karl divorced in 1973 when Fisher was 17 years old.

Fisher "hid in books" as a child, becoming known in her family as "the bookworm". She spent her earliest years reading classic literature and writing poetry. She attended Beverly Hills High School until age 16, when she appeared as a debutante and singer in the hit Broadway revival Irene (1973), also starring her mother. Her time on Broadway interfered with her education, resulting in her dropping out of high school. In 1973, she enrolled at London's Central School of Speech and Drama, which she attended for 18 months. Following her time there, she was accepted at Sarah Lawrence College, where she planned to study the arts. She later left without graduating.

== Career ==
=== 1970s ===
She was extremely smart; a talented actress, writer and comedienne with a very colorful personality that everyone loved. In Star Wars she was our great and powerful princess—feisty, wise and full of hope in a role that was more difficult than most people might think.

— director George Lucas

Fisher made her film debut in 1975 as the precociously seductive character Lorna Karpf in the Columbia Pictures comedy Shampoo, filmed in mid-1974, when she was age 17. In 1977, Fisher starred as Princess Leia in George Lucas' space opera film Star Wars opposite Mark Hamill and Harrison Ford. Though she and her fellow actors were not close at the time, they bonded after the commercial success of the film.

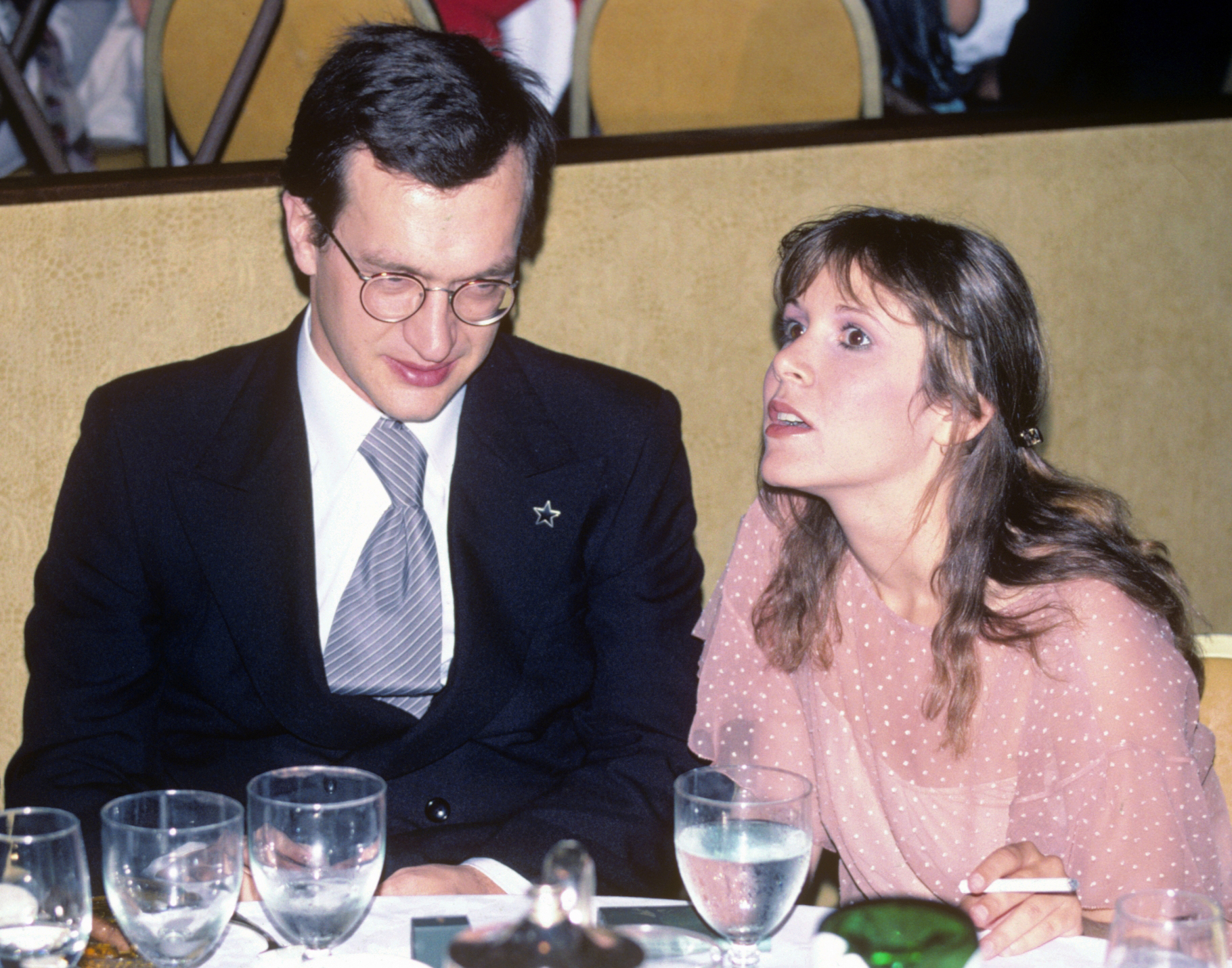
Fisher with Wim Wenders at a private party after the premiere of the movie F.I.S.T. in 1978

In April 1978, Fisher appeared as the love interest in Ringo Starr's 1978 TV special Ringo. The next month, she starred alongside John Ritter (who had also appeared in Ringo) in the ABC-TV film Leave Yesterday Behind. At this time, Fisher appeared with Laurence Olivier and Joanne Woodward in the anthology series Laurence Olivier Presents in a television version of the William Inge play Come Back, Little Sheba. That November, she played Princess Leia in the 1978 TV production Star Wars Holiday Special, and sang in the last scene.

=== 1980s ===
Fisher appeared in the film The Blues Brothers as Jake's vengeful ex-lover; she is listed in the credits as "Mystery Woman". While Fisher was in Chicago filming the movie, she choked on a Brussels sprout; Dan Aykroyd performed the Heimlich maneuver which "saved my life", according to Fisher. She appeared on Broadway in Censored Scenes from King Kong in 1980. The same year, she reprised her role as Princess Leia in The Empire Strikes Back, and appeared with her Star Wars co-stars on the cover of the July 12, 1980, issue of Rolling Stone to promote the film. She also starred as Sister Agnes in the Broadway production of Agnes of God in 1983, a run that overlapped with her mother's appearance in the Broadway company of Woman of the Year.

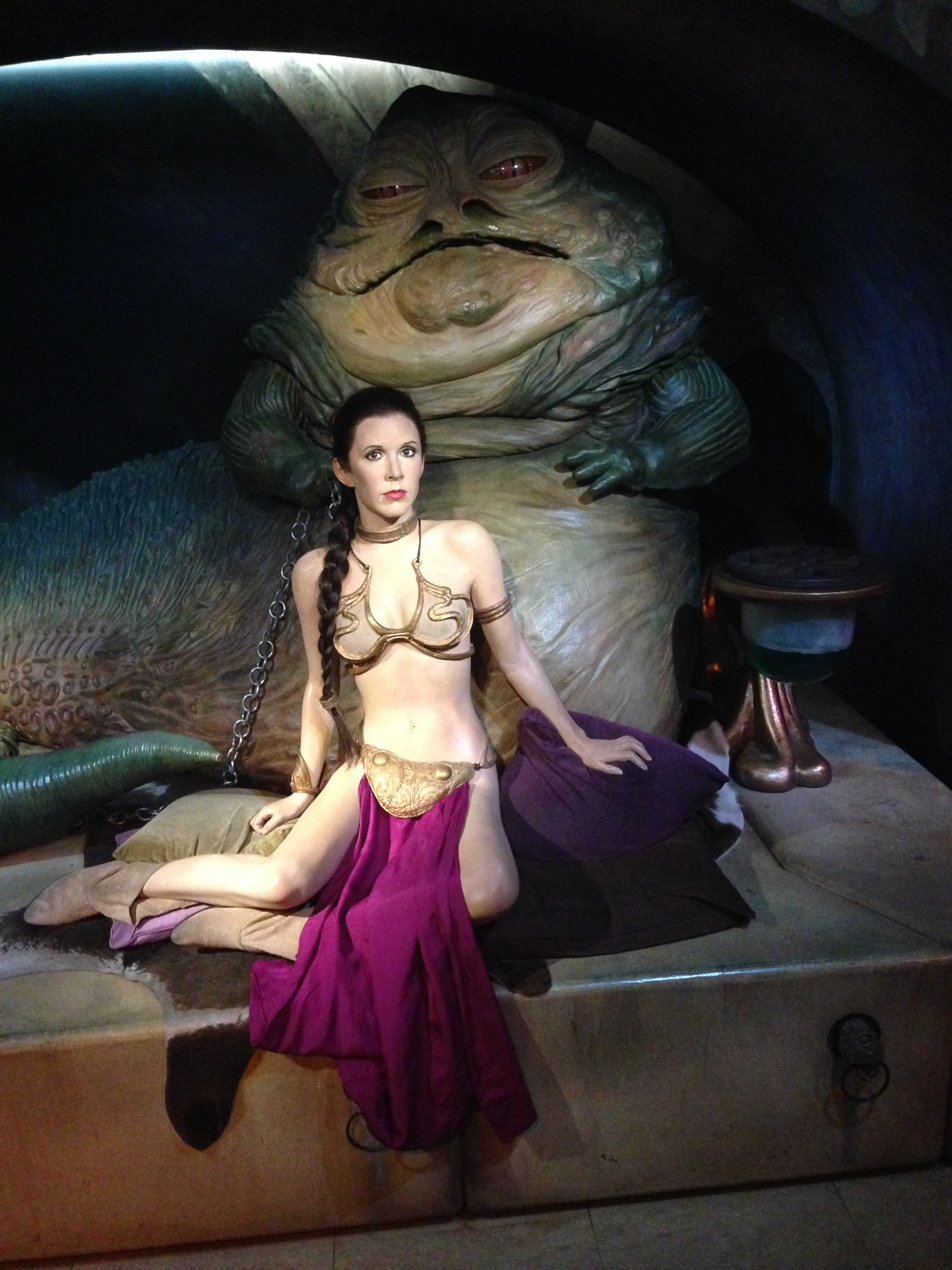
Waxwork of Fisher as Princess Leia, with Jabba the Hutt behind her, from Return of the Jedi, Madame Tussauds, London

In 1983, Fisher returned to the role of Princess Leia in Return of the Jedi, and posed in the character's metal bikini on the cover of the Summer 1983 issue of Rolling Stone to promote the film. The costume later achieved a following of its own. In 1986, she starred along with Barbara Hershey and Mia Farrow in Woody Allen's Hannah and Her Sisters.

In 1987, Fisher published her first novel, Postcards from the Edge. The book was semi-autobiographical in the sense that she fictionalized and satirized real-life events such as her drug addiction of the late 1970s and her relationship with her mother. It became a bestseller, and she received the Los Angeles Pen Award for Best First Novel. Also during 1987, she was in the Australian film The Time Guardian. In 1989, Fisher played a major supporting role in When Harry Met Sally..., and in the same year she appeared with Tom Hanks as his character's wife in The 'Burbs.

=== 1990s ===
In 1990, Columbia Pictures released a film version of Postcards from the Edge, adapted for the screen by Fisher and starring Meryl Streep, Shirley MacLaine, and Dennis Quaid. Fisher appeared in the fantasy comedy film Drop Dead Fred in 1991, and played a therapist in Austin Powers: International Man of Mystery (1997). During the 1990s, Fisher also published the novels Surrender the Pink (1990) and Delusions of Grandma (1993). Fisher wrote an episode of the television sitcom Roseanne entitled "Arsenic and Old Mom", in which her mother Debbie Reynolds made a guest appearance. Fisher also did uncredited script work for movies such as Lethal Weapon 3, where she wrote some of Rene Russo's dialogue, Outbreak, which also starred Russo, The Wedding Singer, and Stop! Or My Mom Will Shoot.

=== 2000s ===
In the 2000 film Scream 3, Fisher played a former actress who acknowledges she looks like Fisher, and in 2001 she played a nun in the Kevin Smith comedy Jay and Silent Bob Strike Back. She also co-wrote the TV comedy film These Old Broads (2001), of which she was also co-executive producer. It starred her mother Debbie Reynolds, as well as Elizabeth Taylor, Joan Collins, and Shirley MacLaine. In 2003 Fisher played Mother Superior, another nun, in Charlie's Angels: Full Throttle.

In addition to acting and writing original works, Fisher was one of the top script doctors in Hollywood, working on the screenplays of other writers. She did uncredited polishes on movies in a 15-year stretch from 1991 to 2005. She was hired by George Lucas to polish scripts for his 1992 TV series The Young Indiana Jones Chronicles and the dialogue for the Star Wars prequel scripts. Her expertise in this area was the reason she was chosen as one of the interviewers for the screenwriting documentary Dreams on Spec in 2007. In an interview in 2004, Fisher said she no longer did much script doctoring.

Fisher also voiced Peter Griffin's boss, Angela, on the animated sitcom Family Guy and wrote the introduction for a book of photographs titled Hollywood Moms, which was published in 2001. Fisher published a sequel to Postcards, The Best Awful There Is, in 2004. In 2005, Women in Film & Video – DC recognized Fisher with the Women of Vision Award.

Fisher wrote and performed in her one-woman play Wishful Drinking at the Geffen Playhouse in Los Angeles from November 2006 to January 2007. Her show then played throughout 2008 at the Berkeley Repertory Theater, San Jose, the Hartford Stage, the Arena Stage and Boston. Fisher published her autobiographical book, also titled Wishful Drinking, based on her successful play in December 2008 and embarked on a media tour. In 2009, Fisher returned to the stage with her play at the Seattle Repertory Theatre. Wishful Drinking then opened on Broadway in New York at Studio 54 and played an extended run from October 2009 until January 2010. In December 2009, Fisher's audiobook recording of Wishful Drinking earned her a nomination for a 2009 Grammy Award in the Best Spoken Word Album category.

Fisher joined Turner Classic Movies host Robert Osborne on Saturday evenings in 2007 for The Essentials with informative and entertaining conversation on Hollywood's best films. She guest-starred in the episode titled "Sex and Another City" from season 3 of Sex and the City with Sarah Jessica Parker. On October 25, 2007, Fisher guest-starred as Rosemary Howard on the second-season episode of 30 Rock called "Rosemary's Baby", for which she received an Emmy Award nomination. On April 28, 2008, she was a guest on Deal or No Deal. In 2008, she also had a cameo as a doctor in the Star Wars-related comedy Fanboys.

When asked if she was still working as a script doctor in December 2008, she said, "I haven't done it for a few years. I did it for many years, and then younger people came to do it, and I started to do new things. It was a long, very lucrative episode of my life. But it's complicated to do that. Now it's all changed, actually. Now, to get a rewrite job, you have to submit your notes for your ideas on how to fix the script. So they can get all the notes from all the different writers, keep the notes, and not hire you. That's free work, and that's what I always call life-wasting events."

=== 2010s ===
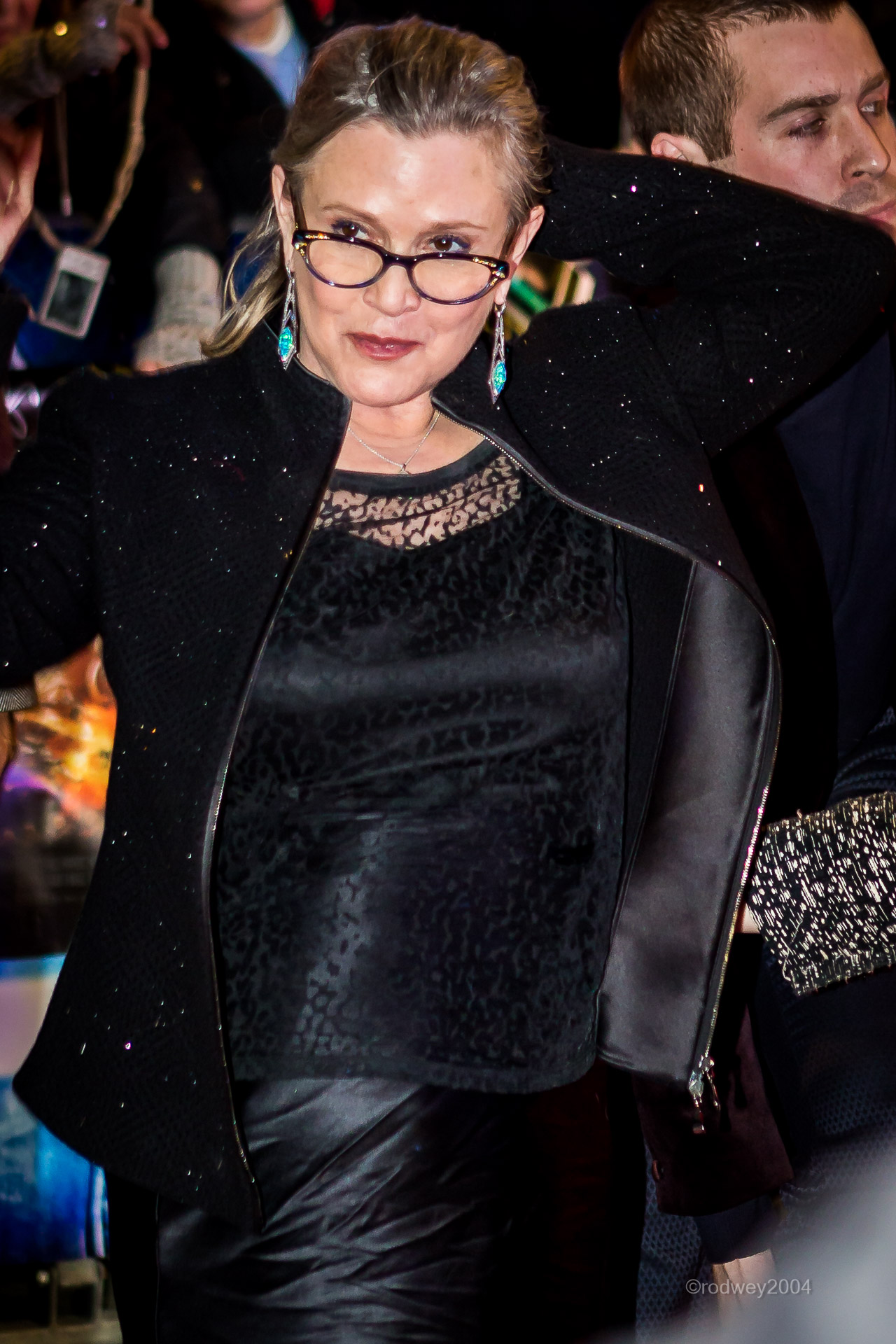
Fisher at the film premiere of Star Wars: The Force Awakens at Leicester Square, London

In 2010, HBO aired a feature-length documentary based on a special live performance of Fisher's Wishful Drinking stage production. At the time of her death, Fisher had been preparing a sequel to the one-woman play.

Fisher appeared on the seventh season of Entourage in the summer of 2010. She was among the featured performers at the Comedy Central Roast of Roseanne, which aired in August 2012. In her monologue, Fisher poked fun at her own mental illness, and her fellow roasters' reliance on weight and menopause jokes. Fisher joked that she had no idea why she was asked to roast Roseanne, until "they explained that we were actually good friends and that apparently we have worked together." Host Jane Lynch joked that Fisher was there to add perspective to Roseanne's struggles with weight and drugs. Fellow roaster Wayne Brady poked fun at Fisher's career, saying she was the only celebrity "whose action figure is worth more than you are."

She was selected as a member of the main competition jury at the 2013 Venice Film Festival. She filmed an appearance on the UK comedy panel show QI that was broadcast on December 25, 2014. Fisher starred alongside Sharon Horgan and comedian Rob Delaney in the British comedy series Catastrophe, that was first broadcast on Channel 4 in the UK on January 19, 2015. Her last appearance on Catastrophe, which aired in the UK on April 4, 2017, left many viewers in tears and earned her a posthumous Primetime Emmy Award for Outstanding Guest Actress in a Comedy Series nomination.

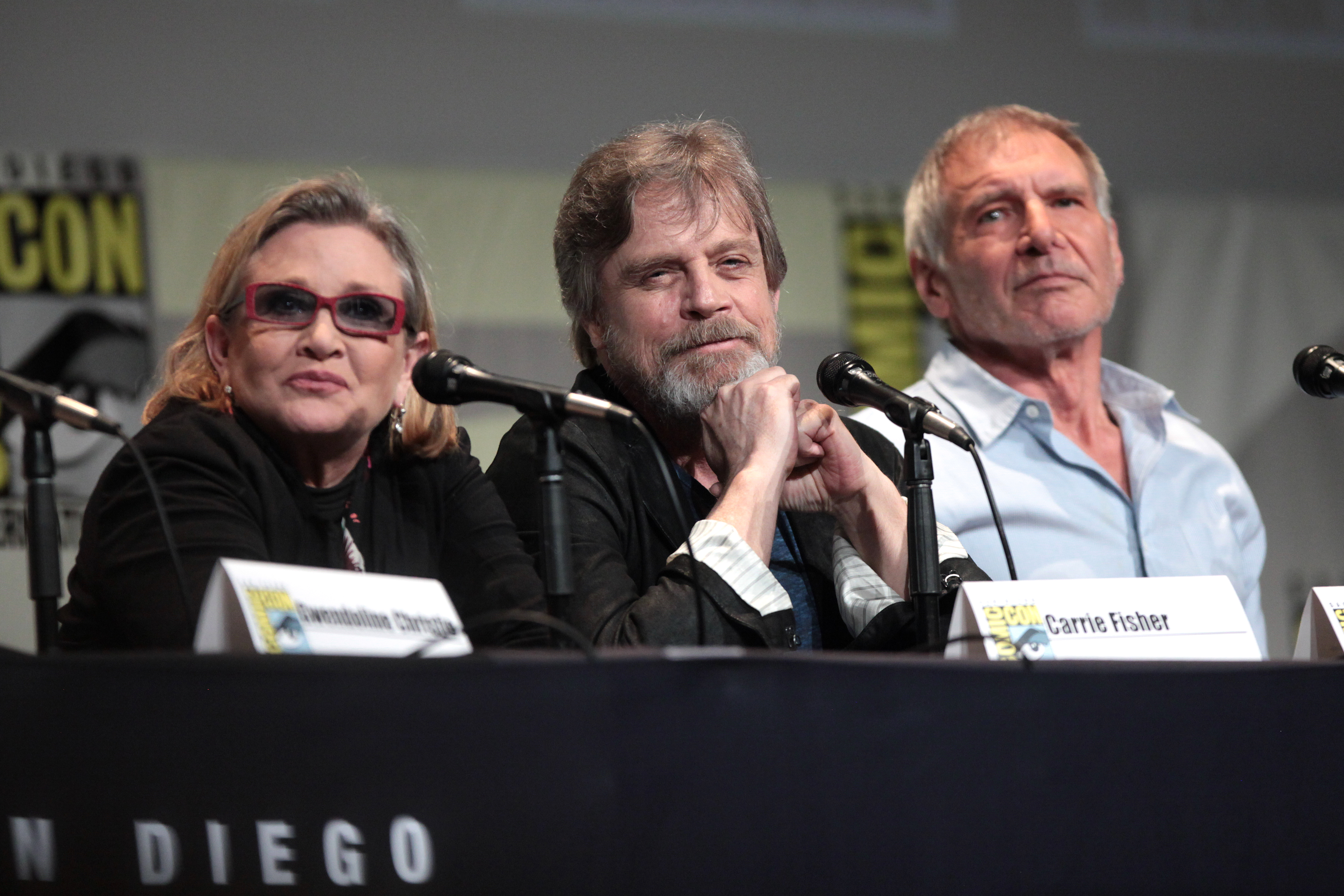
Fisher with Mark Hamill and Harrison Ford at the 2015 San Diego Comic-Con promoting Star Wars: The Force Awakens

In a March 2013 interview following the announcement that a new trilogy of films would be produced, Fisher confirmed that she would reprise her role as Princess Leia in Episode VII of the Star Wars series. Fisher claimed that Leia was "elderly." She's in an intergalactic old folks' home [laughs]. I just think she would be just like she was before, only slower and less inclined to be up for the big battle." After other media outlets reported this on March 6, 2013, her representative said the same day that Fisher was joking and that nothing was announced.

In a January 2014 interview, Fisher confirmed her involvement and the involvement of the original cast in the upcoming sequels by saying, "As for the next Star Wars film, myself, Harrison Ford and Mark Hamill are expected to report to work in March or April. I'd like to wear my old cinnamon buns hairstyle again but with white hair. I think that would be funny."

In March 2014, Fisher stated that she was moving to London for six months because that was where Star Wars Episode VII filming would take place. On April 29, 2014, the cast for the new sequel was officially announced, and Fisher, along with Harrison Ford, Mark Hamill, Peter Mayhew, Anthony Daniels, and Kenny Baker, was all cast in their original roles for the film. Star Wars Episode VII, subtitled The Force Awakens, was released worldwide on December 18, 2015. Fisher was nominated for a 2016 Saturn Award for Best Supporting Actress for her portrayal.

In Rogue One (2016), which is set just before the original trilogy, younger versions of Leia and the Peter Cushing character Grand Moff Tarkin appear through computer animation. Fisher had completed filming her role as Leia in Star Wars: The Last Jedi (2017) shortly before her death. Director Rian Johnson has stated that many of Fisher's own ideas made it into the film, and that she supplied a few of Leia's lines. Fisher appeared posthumously in Star Wars: The Rise of Skywalker (2019) via unreleased footage from The Force Awakens.

Fisher's memoir, The Princess Diarist, was released in November 2016. The book is based on diaries she kept while filming the original Star Wars trilogy in the late 1970s and early 1980s. Her audiobook recording of the memoir earned her the 2018 Grammy Award for Best Spoken Word Album, awarded 13 months after her death.

Fisher and her mother appear in Bright Lights: Starring Carrie Fisher and Debbie Reynolds, a 2016 documentary about their close relationship featuring interviews, photographs, and home movies. The documentary premiered at the 2016 Cannes Film Festival and was broadcast on January 7, 2017.

Fisher appeared as herself in the final episode of series 1 of Urban Myths (2017) but the episode was never broadcast following objections by the Jackson family to Joseph Fiennes' portrayal of Michael Jackson in the episode.

=== 2020s ===
Fisher was featured in the film Wonderwell with Rita Ora, which was filmed in mid-2016 in Italy; it received a limited theatrical release on June 23, 2023, followed by a digital release.

== Personal life ==
=== Marriages and relationships ===
In her 2016 autobiography The Princess Diarist, Fisher wrote that she and Harrison Ford, who was married at the time, had a three-month affair during the filming of Star Wars in 1976.

Fisher met musician Paul Simon through a mutual friend, actress Shelley Duvall, in 1978, and the pair began dating.

In 1980, she was briefly engaged to Canadian actor and comedian Dan Aykroyd, who proposed to her on the set of their film The Blues Brothers. She said: "We had rings, we got blood tests, the whole shot. But then I got back together with Paul Simon."

Fisher was married to Simon from August 1983 to July 1984, and they dated again for a time after their divorce. During their marriage, she appeared in Simon's music video for the song "Rene and Georgette Magritte with Their Dog after the War". Simon's song "Hearts and Bones" is about their romance, and she is referenced in his song "Graceland", which was written after their divorce. Fisher said she felt privileged to appear in Simon's songs.

Fisher subsequently had a relationship with the Creative Artists Agency's principal talent agent, Bryan Lourd. Their only child, Billie Lourd, was born in 1992. Eddie Fisher stated in his autobiography (Been There Done That) that his granddaughter's name is Catherine Fisher Lourd and her nickname is "Billy". Carrie Fisher's relationship with Bryan Lourd ended when he left her for a man. In interviews, Fisher described Lourd as her second husband, but a 2004 profile revealed that she and Lourd were never legally married.

Fisher had a close relationship with English singer-songwriter James Blunt. While working on his album Back to Bedlam in 2003, Blunt spent much of his time at Fisher's residence. When Vanity Fair's George Wayne asked Fisher if their relationship was sexual, she replied: "Absolutely not, but I did become his therapist. He was a soldier. This boy has seen awful stuff. Every time James hears fireworks or anything like that, his heart beats faster and he gets 'fight or flight.' You know, he comes from a long line of soldiers dating back to the 10th century. He would tell me these horrible stories. He was a captain, a reconnaissance soldier. I became James' therapist. So it would have been unethical to sleep with my patient." She would become Blunt's son's godmother, with Blunt saying, "I hoped Carrie would look after herself. That’s why I asked her to be a godmother – I could see a destructive human being and I wanted her to care enough for herself that my son might know her. And it wasn’t to be."

On February 26, 2005, R. Gregory "Greg" Stevens, a 42-year-old lobbyist, was found dead in Fisher's California home; a longtime friend of Fisher, he had arrived a few days prior to attend the Academy Awards ceremony on the 27th. The final autopsy report listed the cause of death as "cocaine and oxycodone use" but added chronic and apparently previously undiagnosed heart disease as contributing factors. Media coverage of an initial autopsy report used the word "overdose", but that wording is not in the final report. In an interview, Fisher claimed that Stevens's ghost haunted her mansion, which unsettled her: "I was a nut for a year, and in that year I took drugs again."

In her later years, Fisher had a pet French Bulldog named Gary, which she brought to numerous appearances and interviews. Following her death, reports indicated that Fisher's daughter Billie Lourd would take care of Gary.

=== Advocacy ===
Fisher described herself as an "enthusiastic agnostic who would be happy to be shown that there is a God." She was raised Protestant, but often attended Jewish services (her father's religion) with Orthodox Jewish friends.

During the 1988 presidential election, Fisher was supportive of Democratic presidential nominee Michael Dukakis.

In 2016, Harvard College gave Fisher its Annual Outstanding Lifetime Achievement Award in Cultural Humanism, noting that "her forthright activism and outspokenness about addiction, mental illness, and agnosticism have advanced public discourse on these issues with creativity and empathy."

Fisher was a supporter and advocate for several causes, including women's advocacy, animal rights, and LGBT causes. She was open about her experiences caring for friends who had AIDS, contributing financially to various AIDS and HIV organizations, including hosting a benefit for amfAR, The Foundation for AIDS Research. She also served as an honorary board member for the International Bipolar Foundation, and, in 2014, received the Golden Heart Award for her work with The Midnight Mission.

She was a spokesperson for Jenny Craig weight loss television ads that aired in January 2011.

=== Bipolar disorder and drug use ===
During appearances on 20/20 and The Secret Life of the Manic Depressive with Stephen Fry, Fisher publicly discussed her diagnosis of bipolar disorder and her addictions to cocaine and prescription medication. She said her drug use was a form of self-medication; she used pain medication such as Percodan to "dial down" the manic aspect of her bipolar disorder. She gave nicknames to her bipolar moods: Roy ("the wild ride of a mood") and Pam ("who stands on the shore and sobs"). "Drugs made me feel more normal", she explained to Psychology Today in 2001. "They contained me." She discussed her 2008 memoir Wishful Drinking and various topics in it with Matt Lauer on NBC's Today that same year, and also revealed that she would have turned down the role of Princess Leia had she realized it would give her the celebrity status that made her parents' lives difficult. This interview was followed by a similar appearance on The Late Late Show with Craig Ferguson on December 12, 2008, where she discussed her electroconvulsive therapy (ECT) treatments. At one point, she received ECT every six weeks to "blow apart the cement" in her brain. In 2014, she said she was no longer receiving the treatment. Her 2011 book Shockaholic describes these treatments.

In another interview, Fisher revealed that she used cocaine during the filming of The Empire Strikes Back. "Slowly, I realized I was doing a bit more drugs than other people and losing my choice in the matter", she noted. In 1985, after months of sobriety, she accidentally overdosed on a combination of prescription medication and sleeping pills. She was rushed to the hospital, creating the turn of events that led to much of the material in her novel and screenplay, Postcards from the Edge. Asked why she did not take on the role of her story's protagonist, named Suzanne, in the film version, Fisher remarked, "I've already played Suzanne."

== Death ==
After finishing the European leg of her book tour, Fisher was on a commercial flight on December 23, 2016, United Airlines Flight 935 from London to Los Angeles, when she had a medical emergency around fifteen minutes before the aircraft landed. (Note: Radio transmissions and emergency calls included the phrases "cardiac episode" and "cardiac arrest"; witnesses believed they had seen Fisher having a heart attack. Several news outlets called the episode a "massive heart attack".) A passenger seated near Fisher reported that she had stopped breathing; another passenger performed CPR on Fisher until paramedics arrived at the scene. Emergency services in Los Angeles were contacted when the flight crew reported a passenger unresponsive prior to landing. Fisher was taken by ambulance to the Ronald Reagan UCLA Medical Center, where she was placed on a ventilator.

On the morning of December 27, 2016, after being in intensive care at UCLA Medical Center for four days, Fisher died at the age of 60. Fisher's daughter Billie Lourd confirmed her mother's death in a statement to the press.

On January 9, 2017, the Los Angeles County Department of Public Health issued a death certificate that stated "cardiac arrest/deferred" as the cause of death, with more tests to be expected. In a June 16, 2017 news release, the Los Angeles County coroner's office said that the exact cause of death could not be determined, but sleep apnea and the buildup of fatty tissue on the walls of arteries were among the contributing factors.

A full report from June 19, 2017, stated that Fisher had cocaine in her system, as well as traces of heroin, other opiates, and MDMA. The report also stated that the investigation was unable to determine when she had taken the drugs and whether they contributed to her death. Her daughter stated that Fisher "battled drug addiction and mental illness her entire life. She ultimately died of it. She was purposefully open in all of her work about the social stigmas surrounding these diseases.... I know my Mom, she'd want her death to encourage people to be open about their struggles." In her 2008 work Wishful Drinking, Fisher wrote that "no matter how I go, I want it reported that I drowned in moonlight, strangled by my own bra." After Fisher's death, several news sources and magazines honored her request in their obituaries, with Bustle featuring a fantastical reimagining of Fisher's last moments as an ascent into space.

On December 28, 2016, the day after Fisher's death, her mother Debbie Reynolds had a stroke at the home of her son Todd, where the family was planning Fisher's burial arrangements. She was taken to Cedars-Sinai Medical Center where she died later that afternoon. According to Todd, Reynolds had said, "I want to be with Carrie" immediately before she had the stroke. (Note: In an interview with ABC News, Fisher later said that his mother "didn't die of a broken heart. ... It wasn't that she was sitting around inconsolable—not at all. She simply said that she didn't get to see Carrie come back from London. She expressed how much she loved my sister. She then said she really wanted to be with Carrie—in those precise words—and within 15 minutes from that conversation, she faded out. Within 30 minutes, she technically was gone.") On January 5, 2017, a joint private memorial was held for Fisher and Reynolds. Fisher was cremated while her mother was entombed. A portion of Fisher's ashes was placed beside Reynolds in a crypt at Forest Lawn Memorial Park in Hollywood Hills. The remainder of those ashes are held in a giant novelty Prozac pill.

== Legacy ==
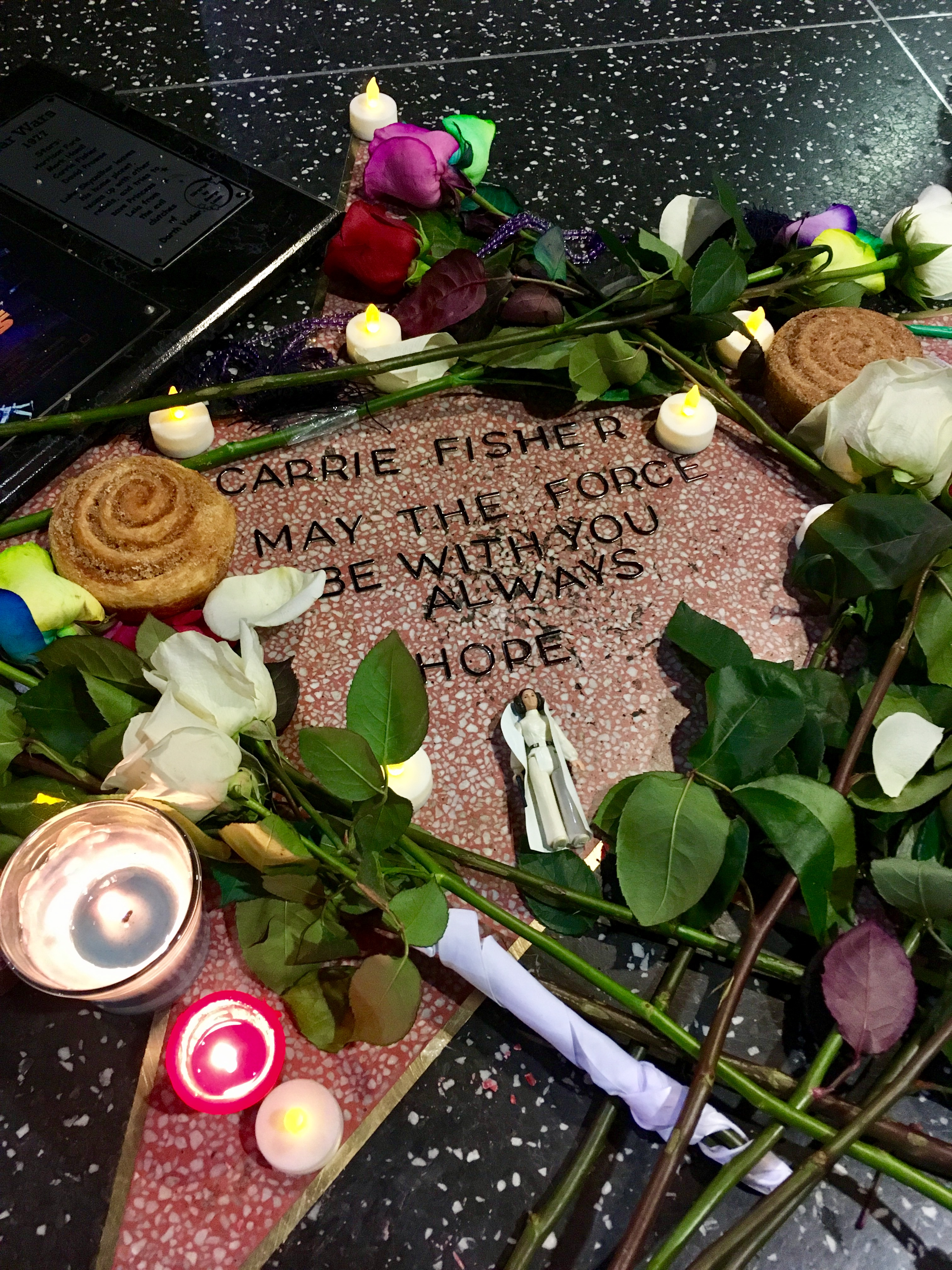
Fisher's fan-made star on the Hollywood Walk of Fame

In the absence of a star for Fisher on the Hollywood Walk of Fame after her death, fans created their own memorial using a blank star. Along with flowers and candles, words put on the blank star read, "Carrie Fisher / May The Force Be With You Always / Hope". Fans also gathered at the Yoda Fountain outside the Lucasfilm offices in San Francisco. In June 2021, it was announced that Fisher would receive an official star on the Hollywood Walk of Fame in 2022. She received the star on May 4, 2023, which was Star Wars Day.

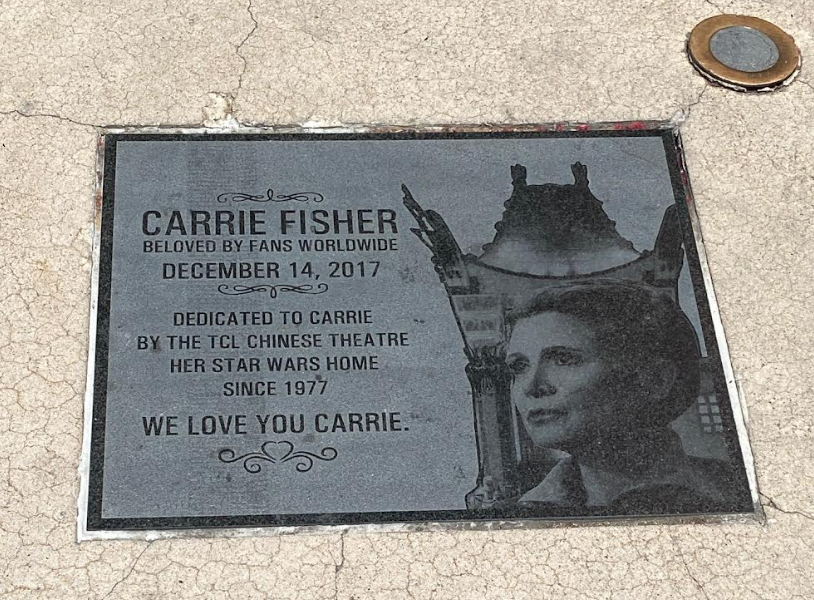
Plaque honoring Fisher outside Grauman's Chinese Theatre in Hollywood.

In the video game Star Wars: The Old Republic, thousands of fans paid tribute to Fisher by gathering at House Organa on the planet Alderaan where Fisher's character in Star Wars was raised. Lightsaber vigils and similar events in Fisher's honor were held at various Alamo Drafthouse Cinema theaters and other sites. On January 6, 2017, the lights on Broadway in Manhattan were darkened for one minute in honor of Fisher and her mother. Fisher and Reynolds were also both featured in the 89th Academy Awards In Memoriam segment. On March 25, 2017, a public memorial for mother and daughter was held at the Hall of Liberty theater in Forest Lawn Memorial Park. The event was streamed live on Reynolds' website. On April 14, a special tribute to Fisher was held by Mark Hamill during the Star Wars Celebration in Orlando. The 2017 film Star Wars: The Last Jedi was dedicated to her memory. On October 27, 2023, James Blunt released an album including a track called "Dark Thought" about the death of Fisher, who was a friend of his.

== Works ==
Novels

- Postcards from the Edge (1987), ISBN 0-7434-6651-9
- Surrender the Pink (1990), ISBN 0-671-66640-1
- Delusions of Grandma (1993), ISBN 0-684-85803-7
- The Best Awful There Is (2004), ISBN 0-7434-7857-6

Non-fiction

- Hollywood Moms (2001; introduction), ISBN 978-0-8109-4157-1
- Wishful Drinking (2008), ISBN 1-4391-0225-2
- Shockaholic (2011), ISBN 978-0-7432-6482-2
- The Princess Diarist (2016), ISBN 978-0-399-17359-2

Screenplays

- Postcards from the Edge (1990)
- These Old Broads (2001)
- Doctored screenplays include Sister Act (1992), Last Action Hero (1993), Anastasia (1997) and The Wedding Singer (1998)

Plays

- Wishful Drinking (2006)
- A Spy in the House of Me (2008)

Audio

- William Shakespeare's Sonnet 29 on Take All My Loves: 9 Shakespeare Sonnets (2016)

== Awards and honors ==
Award	Year	Category	Nominated work	Results	Ref.
British Academy Film Awards	1990	Best Adapted Screenplay	Postcards from the Edge	Nominated	
Dorian Awards	2016	Wilde Wit of the Year	—N/a	Won (Note: Posthumous award.)	
Drama Desk Awards	2010	Outstanding Solo Performance	Wishful Drinking	Nominated	
Grammy Awards	2009	Best Spoken Word Album	Wishful Drinking	Nominated	
Grammy Awards	2017	Best Spoken Word Album	The Princess Diarist	Won	
Hugo Awards	2017	Best Related Work	The Princess Diarist	Nominated	
Online Film & Television Association Awards	2011	Best Host or Panelist in a Non-Fiction Program	Carrie Fisher: Wishful Drinking	Nominated	
Online Film & Television Association Awards	2017	Best Guest Actress in a Comedy Series	Catastrophe	Won	
Online Film & Television Association Awards	2019	Film Hall of Fame: Actors	—N/a	Inducted	
Online Film & Television Association Awards	2021	Television Hall of Fame: Actors	—N/a	Inducted	
Online Film & Television Association Awards	2023	Film Hall of Fame: Characters	Princess Leia Organa	Inducted	
Online Film Critics Society Awards	2016	Memorial Award	—N/a	Honored	
Primetime Emmy Awards	2008	Outstanding Guest Actress in a Comedy Series	30 Rock	Nominated	
Primetime Emmy Awards	2011	Outstanding Variety, Music or Comedy Special	Carrie Fisher: Wishful Drinking	Nominated	
Primetime Emmy Awards	2017	Outstanding Guest Actress in a Comedy Series	Catastrophe	Nominated	
Saturn Awards	1977	Best Actress	Star Wars: Episode IV – A New Hope	Nominated	
Saturn Awards	1983	Best Actress	Star Wars: Episode VI – Return of the Jedi	Nominated	
Saturn Awards	1988	President's Award	—N/a	Won	
Saturn Awards	2015	Best Supporting Actress	Star Wars: Episode VII – The Force Awakens	Nominated	
Saturn Awards	2017	Best Supporting Actress in a Film	Star Wars: Episode VIII – The Last Jedi	Nominated	
Teen Choice Awards	2018	Choice Movie Actress: Fantasy	Star Wars: Episode VIII – The Last Jedi	Won	
