= The Best Awful There Is =

2004 novel by Carrie Fisher

- Cover to "The Best Awful" renamed edition
- Author: Carrie Fisher
- Language: English
- Genre: Autobiographical novel
- Publisher: Simon & Schuster
- Publication date: January 2004
- Publication place: United States
- Media type: Print (hardback and paperback)
- Pages: 269 (hardback edition) & 288 (paperback edition)
- ISBN: 0-684-80913-3 (hardback edition) & ISBN 0-7432-6930-6 (paperback edition)
- OCLC: 51086674
- Dewey Decimal: 813/.54 21
- LC Class: PS3556.I8115 B4 2003
- Preceded by: Postcards from the Edge

The Best Awful There Is (retitled The Best Awful as a paperback), is a 2004 novel by actress and author Carrie Fisher. It is a sequel to her debut novel Postcards from the Edge.

Like most of Fisher's books, this novel is semi-autobiographical and fictionalizes events from her real life. The book features the protagonist character Suzanne Vale that first appeared in Postcards from the Edge. The book fictionalizes the author's relationship with Bryan Lourd, the father of her daughter Billie Lourd.

The Best Awful There Is was later published with the shorter title The Best Awful and is now largely known by this title.

== Plot summary ==
Suzanne Vale, an actress with bipolar disorder, married Leland Franklin, a studio executive who helped her find her "far-flung best self." He then left her for a man, when their daughter, Honey, was three.

Three years later, Vale works as a television talk show host and has a six-year-old daughter, a former husband, and an aging actress mother. Her affection for Honey provides ongoing motivation.

When Vale, a recovering drug addict, stops taking her medication, she is plunged into a manic episode. She goes on a search for OxyContin in Tijuana with a tattoo artist friend and a new house guest, a clinically depressed patient she met at her psycho-pharmacologist's office.

A psychotic break lands Vale at Shady Lanes, where she is the "latest loony to hit the bin." Despite her mental illness, Vale still has her wit and ability to find irony in every situation as she struggles back from the brink of insanity.
