= These Old Broads =

2001 American comedy TV film

- DVD cover
- Genre: Comedy
- Written by: Carrie Fisher; Elaine Pope
- Directed by: Matthew Diamond
- Starring: Shirley MacLaine; Debbie Reynolds; Joan Collins; Elizabeth Taylor; Jonathan Silverman
- Music by: Guy Moon; Steve Tyrell
- Country of origin: United States
- Original language: English

Production
- Executive producers: Ilene Amy Berg; Laurence Mark
- Producers: Lewis Abel; John D. McNamara
- Cinematography: Eric Van Haren Noman
- Editor: Casey O. Rohrs
- Running time: 89 minutes
- Production companies: Berger Queen Productions; Laurence Mark Productions; Columbia TriStar Television

Original release
- Network: ABC
- Release: February 12, 2001

These Old Broads is a 2001 American made-for-television comedy film directed by Matthew Diamond, written by Carrie Fisher and Elaine Pope, and starring Fisher's mother Debbie Reynolds, as well as Shirley MacLaine, Joan Collins, and Elizabeth Taylor in her final film role. In a 2001 BBC Omnibus documentary about Taylor, MacLaine says that Julie Andrews and Lauren Bacall were originally planned to be in the film. The role of Miriam Hodges was originally offered to June Allyson, who ended up in a cameo instead. The film premiered on February 12, 2001 on ABC.

== Plot summary ==
Network television executive Gavin hopes to reunite celebrated Hollywood stars Piper Grayson, Kate Westbourne, and Addie Holden in a TV special after their 1960s film musical Boy Crazy is re-released to wide public acclaim in the 1990s. Though the three women share the same agent, Beryl Mason, Gavin's seemingly insurmountable obstacle is that they all cannot stand one another.

== Cast ==
- Shirley MacLaine as Kate Westbourne
- Debbie Reynolds as Piper Grayson
- Joan Collins as Addie Holden
- Elizabeth Taylor as Beryl Mason
- Jonathan Silverman as Wesley Westbourne
- Pat Crawford Brown as Miriam Hodges (Addie's mother)
- Nestor Carbonell as Gavin
- Peter Graves as Bill
- Gene Barry as Mr. Stern
- Pat Harrington Jr. as Tony Frank
- Carlos Jacott as Tom
- Hinton Battle as Pete
- Suzanne Carney as Connie
- Heath Hyche as Ben Collier
- Betty Carvalho as Rosa
- Joe Sabatino as Leo
- Sheri Hellard as Laurie Miller
- Amy Van Horne as "Blonde Money Honey"
- Larry Sullivan as Jason (as Larry Sullivan Jr.)
- Todd Fisher as Timothy
- Tricia Leigh Fisher as Hooker
- Carrie Fisher as Hooker
- Zach Woodlee as Boy Crazy Dancer
- Kevin Alexander Stea as Boy Crazy Dancer (as Kevin Stea)
- Dante Henderson as Boy Crazy Dancer
- June Allyson as Lady in Hotel (uncredited)
- Kevin Nealon as Roger (uncredited)

== Back story of leads ==
MacLaine, Reynolds, Collins and Taylor had all crossed paths personally and/or professionally in Hollywood over the years. Collins dated MacLaine's brother, Warren Beatty, when he was just starting his film career. Collins was also put on standby to replace an ailing Taylor in the film Cleopatra but Taylor recovered from her illness and completed the film. Reynolds' husband, Eddie Fisher, left her for a grieving Taylor after his best friend and Taylor's husband, Mike Todd, was killed in a plane crash. Reynolds and Taylor had also been close friends before the affair, but they grew to hate each other due to what happened and stayed away for twelve years. However, the two eventually reconciled on a cruise ship in a plan set up by Carrie Fisher and once again remained friends until Taylor's death in 2011. MacLaine wanted the role of Molly Brown in The Unsinkable Molly Brown but a clause in her contract prevented her from getting it; this made the role available for Reynolds, who garnered an Oscar nomination for her performance in the film. MacLaine portrayed a character loosely based on Reynolds in Postcards from the Edge, written by Reynolds's daughter, Carrie Fisher.

The story of Kate Westbourne's adopted son Wesley Westbourne, who is actually her biological son from her affair with the late Dick Preston, may have been inspired by the true story of Loretta Young, Judy Lewis and Clark Gable.

== Reception ==
Michael Speier, writing for Variety, considered the movie "simple, nasty fun".
