= One November Yankee =

Play by Josh Ravetch

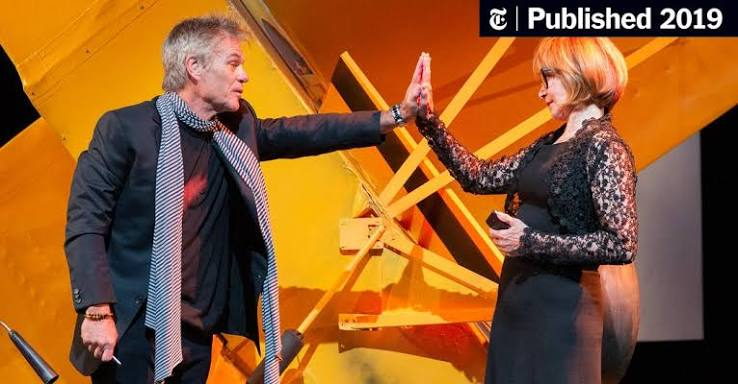

One November Yankee is a play by American writer Josh Ravetch. It was first performed at The Pasadena Playhouse as a workshop production with Robert Forster and Loretta Swit as part of their Hot House Series before opening at The NoHo Arts Center in 2012. The play starred two time Emmy winner, and TV's Hot Lips Houlihan from M*A*S*H*, Loretta Swit, and LA Law's Harry Hamlin. The set was designed by Dana Moran Williams. The film rights were picked up by Pam Williams Productions as a feature film for Ravetch to adapt and direct.
