= George Wayne =

Vanity Fair writer

George Wayne (born 1952) is a New York writer who wrote a celebrity Q&A column for Vanity Fair until 2015. He has been called a "celebrity griller" and his work is considered controversial, since he asks blunt and occasionally random and rude questions.

He is the author of a book called Anyone Who's Anyone: The Astonishing Celebrity Interviews, 1987-2017, which features interviews with Ivana Trump, Martha Stewart, and Farrah Fawcett. In Interview Magazine, Wayne said that he considers his book a "post-modern treaty on pop culture".
