= Delusions of Grandma =

1994 novel by Carrie Fisher

- Author: Carrie Fisher
- Language: English
- Genre: Autobiographical novel
- Publisher: Simon & Schuster
- Publication date: 1994 (1st edition)
- Publication place: United States
- Media type: Print (hardback)
- Pages: 260 pp (hardback edition)
- ISBN: 0-671-73227-7 (hardback edition)
- OCLC: 29668034
- Dewey Decimal: 813/.54 20
- LC Class: PS3556.I8115 D4 1994

Delusions of Grandma is a novel by actress and author Carrie Fisher that was published in 1994.

Like most of Fisher's books, this novel is semi-autobiographical and fictionalizes events seemingly from her real life.

== Plot summary ==
The book is about Cora Sharpe, a Hollywood screenwriter who is eight-and-a-half months pregnant by her boyfriend, an attorney named Ray, a relationship that has gone wrong. Concerned that she will not survive labor, Cora begins to write long letters to her unborn child. As she writes, she begins to recall the events that led to her current situation.

Her relationship with Ray became more complicated by the arrival of his mother, who came to live with them to recuperate from breast surgery. Cora's friend and co-writer, Bud, who has bipolar disorder, then moves in with them. When another friend, William, who is in the final stages of dying of AIDS, moves in, Ray decides that Cora's efforts to care for William during his final days on earth signals that he, Ray, is not her top priority in life.

As things get out of control, Cora returns home to her mother, a retired musical comedy star, and Bud follows. There is an in-depth look at the heartfelt expectations of Cora's zany mother, the show-bizzy grandma-to-be. Cora and Bud then join her mother in an inexplicable and madcap scheme to kidnap Cora's grandfather, who is stricken with Alzheimer's, from his nursing home and take him back to his hometown of Whitewright, Texas.

The story then concludes with the birth of Cora's child.
