= Wishful Drinking =

2008 book by Carrie Fisher

- Author: Carrie Fisher & Joshua Ravetch
- Audio read by: Carrie Fisher
- Language: English
- Genre: Humor, Autobiography
- Publisher: Simon & Schuster
- Publication date: December 2, 2008
- Publication place: United States
- Media type: Print (hardback)
- Pages: 163 (hardback edition)
- ISBN: 1-4391-0225-2 (hardback edition)
- OCLC: 232979321
- Dewey Decimal: 791.43028092 22
- LC Class: PS3556.I8115 Z46 2008
- Followed by: Shockaholic

Wishful Drinking is an autobiographical humor book by American actress and author Carrie Fisher, published by Simon & Schuster in 2008. Fisher's book was based on her one-woman stage show, which she developed with writer/director Joshua Ravetch.

The show debuted at The Geffen Playhouse. Fisher performed with Ravetch co-creating and directing. It enjoyed a successful Broadway run and then toured in other cities. In 2010, HBO filmed a feature-length documentary of the stage play.

== Book reception ==
Wishful Drinking received generally positive reviews from critics. The January 2009 New York Times review described it as a "funny, sardonic little memoir", but "pretty slight, padded out with big type, extra space between the lines and some family photographs, and it displays at times an almost antic need to entertain. The paragraphs are short, and the jokes – the puns, the wisecracks, the deadpan one-liners – come rattling along at the rate of one every other sentence or so." Salon reviewer Rebecca Traister found the book quite funny in large part, but was disappointed that "instead of pushing aside the twinkling craziness of her outside life to meaningfully reveal the crazy on the inside, as she has always done so well, Fisher is now gathering all the starry stuff around her for comfort and reassurance about who she is and what she means."

The author, who died on December 27, 2016, had written the following comment in the book, and it was widely published by the news media after her death:

Now I think that this would make for a fantastic obit—so I tell my younger friends that no matter how I go, I want it reported that I drowned in moonlight, strangled by my own bra.

== Stage adaptation ==
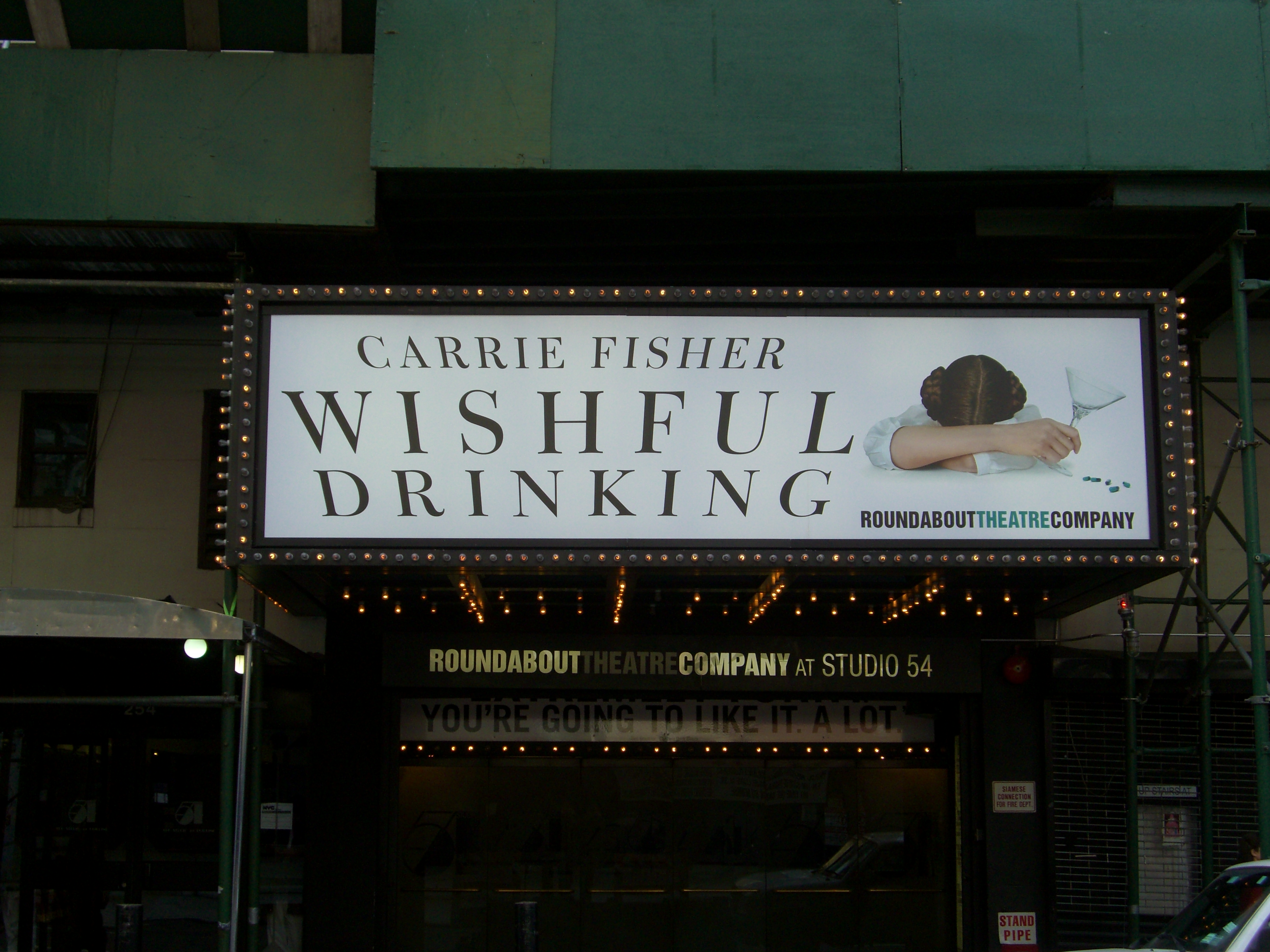
Carrie Fisher's play on Broadway at Studio 54

The book followed Fisher's one-woman play in which Fisher had been performing. Developed originally at The Geffen Playhouse with Josh Ravetch co-creating and directing the world premiere, it moved to Berkeley Repertory Theatre near San Francisco at the beginning of 2008, the production opened in a limited run on Broadway at Studio 54 on September 22, 2009 (previews) and October 4, 2009, and closed on January 17, 2010. After its successful San Francisco Bay Area run and before moving to Broadway, Wishful Drinking played at, among other venues, the Arena Stage in Washington, D.C., in September 2008, and Seattle Repertory Theatre April – May 2009.

== Production rights dispute ==
While the show met with critical and popular success on Broadway in New York, Fisher was soon embroiled in a battle with producer Jonathan Reinis over its production rights. Each claimed lost revenue at the hands of the other.

== Film documentary ==
HBO cable television released a filmed documentary of the stage show, directed by Fenton Bailey and Randy Barbato, and first broadcast in December 2010. The 76-minute film was released on DVD on September 13, 2011. The film production and DVD received a mixture of reviews. In the Los Angeles Times, Robert Lloyd described the performance captured: "Fisher can be broad, but that is also the person she plays everywhere now: a little larger than life, worn but not worn out. She's funny as an actress, and as a writer makes memorable phrases". Boston Globe reviewer Matthew Gilbert wrote, "Fisher’s obsession with her parents and stepparents can be a little tiresome, to be honest, even while her tales of Hollywood absurdity remain outrageous ... Fisher even starts to seem boastful about her dysfunction ..." Continuing, "Fortunately Fisher does have some self-awareness about the potential for her show to seem like a narcissistic screed. That helps." DVDTalk reviewer Jason Bailey wrote of the released DVD, "To put across the brilliance of Wishful Drinking, all Bailey and Barbato really needed to do was put Fisher on stage, and turn on the cameras. They do that skillfully and unobtrusively." The DVD's content received 4/5 stars, video quality 3/5, audio quality 3.5/5, extras 2.5/5, replay 4/5, with final advice of "Highly Recommended".
