= The Princess Diarist =

2016 memoir (book) by Carrie Fisher

- Author: Carrie Fisher
- Audio read by: Carrie Fisher
- Language: English
- Genre: Humor; Autobiography
- Publisher: Blue Rider Press
- Publication date: November 22, 2016
- Publication place: United States
- Pages: 272
- ISBN: 0-399-17359-5
- Preceded by: Shockaholic

The Princess Diarist is a 2016 memoir written by Carrie Fisher, based on diaries she kept as a young woman around the time she starred in the 1977 film Star Wars. The book is the third memoir Fisher wrote, in addition to four novels and a one-woman Broadway show. It is Fisher's final book, as she died on December 27, 2016, five weeks after its release.

The book describes Fisher's affair with co-star Harrison Ford in detail. At the time of the relationship, Ford was married with two children and in his early 30s.

== Reception ==
The Washington Post's Sibbie O'Sullivan described the book as cringe-worthy, but said, "this memoir is also educational, if you overlook its authorial excesses." Anthony Breznican writing in Entertainment Weekly gave the book a rating of B−, saying, "There isn't a lot of insight into the character or the creation of a movie that means so much to so many, but there's tremendous insight into the volatile heart of a young woman, seen through the eyes of her wiser, older self still seeking her place in the universe."

In early January 2017, shortly after Fisher's death, it topped The New York Times Non-Fiction Best Sellers.

In 2017, the book was nominated for the Hugo Award for Best Related Work and won the Grammy Award for Best Spoken Word Album.
