= Postcards from the Edge (film) =

1990 film by Mike Nichols

- Theatrical release poster
- Directed by: Mike Nichols
- Screenplay by: Carrie Fisher
- Based on: Postcards from the Edge by Carrie Fisher
- Produced by: Mike Nichols; John Calley
- Starring: Meryl Streep; Shirley MacLaine; Dennis Quaid
- Cinematography: Michael Ballhaus
- Edited by: Sam O'Steen
- Music by: Carly Simon
- Production company: Columbia Pictures
- Distributed by: Columbia Pictures
- Release date: September 14, 1990
- Running time: 101 minutes
- Country: United States
- Language: English
- Budget: $22 million
- Box office: $63.4 million

Postcards from the Edge is a 1990 American comedy drama film directed by Mike Nichols. The screenplay by Carrie Fisher is based on her 1987 semi-autobiographical novel. The film stars Meryl Streep, Shirley MacLaine, and Dennis Quaid.

Substance-abusive actress Suzanne Vale, after a stint in a rehab center due to an overdose, is only given a new acting role under the condition she live with a parent, forcing her to move back in with her alcoholic actress mother Doris.

The film was released in North America on September 14, 1990, was a box office success and positively received by critics.

== Plot ==
Actress Suzanne Vale is chewed out on set by director Lowell Kolchek for messing up her lines at the end of a long take. He blames this on her being coked up, especially as they are close to finishing a film. Shortly afterwards, producer Jack Faulkner wakes next to Suzanne, then rushes her to the hospital as she is unresponsive.

After they determine Suzanne suffered a drug overdose, she is admitted to a rehab center at the behest of her mother, veteran actress Doris Mann. She wakes confused, with no memory of what happened nor that her stomach had been pumped. Told the most common cause of overdosing is depression, Suzanne insists she is not suicidal.

Doris is late to the family group session. Suzanne acts happy to see her, but before long the tension she feels towards her attention-greedy mother surfaces. Dr. Frankenthal, who had treated her in the ER, sends her flowers.

Suzanne must rebuild her acting career and life after overcoming her cocaine and Percodan addiction. When she is ready to return to work, her agent Marty Weiner informs her that the studio's insurance policy will cover her only if she lives with a "responsible" individual—such as her mother Doris. However, Suzanne is hesitant to return to her manipulative, self-absorbed mother, from whom she has struggled to escape since growing up in her shadow.

Shortly after arriving on set to a new, low-budget film, a producer introduces himself and warns Suzanne she will be regularly tested for drugs on set for the insurance company. At the end of the day, Doris collects her, hurrying her home for a surprise party. Suzanne is persuaded to sing, but her mother follows to recapture the spotlight.

On set on her second day, yet another producer speaks to Suzanne to critique her acting. Later, she overhears the director Simon apologizing to wardrobe, for her being out of shape. He had also made comments to Suzanne about her performance on her first day. Again, a different producer gives her unwanted feedback, so she requests Simon be her sole communicator on set.

Jack runs into Suzanne on set as she is leaving, convincing her to kiss him. Later, he picks her up at home, taking her for a drive and confesses his love for her. However, Suzanne's euphoria is short-lived when she discovers that Jack is also sleeping with another actress from the film.

Meanwhile, Doris reveals that Suzanne's sleazy business manager, Marty Wiener, has absconded with all her money. Afterwards, Suzanne acknowledges she sees her mother as an alcoholic, admitting her own addictions started back then when her father left. She then points out that Doris gave her sleeping pills from age nine.

On her way to the studio to do looping in the post-production of the Lowell Kolchek film, Suzanne takes some pills from Doris' medicine cabinet, but stops on the way to throw them up. Amid these struggles, Suzanne learns that the paternalistic director Lowell Kolchek has more work for her as long as she stays sober.

However, Suzanne's troubles escalate when she discovers that her mother has crashed her car while drunk. Suzanne rushes to her bedside and they have a heart-to-heart conversation while Suzanne fixes her makeup and conceals her nearly bald head with a scarf. Doris musters her courage and faces the waiting media. Meanwhile, Suzanne runs into Dr. Frankenthal again, who invites her to see a film. Suzanne declines, saying she is not ready to date yet, but he tells her he is willing to wait.

Suzanne performs a country song during shooting of Lowell Kolchek's latest film.

== Cast ==
- Meryl Streep as Suzanne Vale
- Shirley MacLaine as Doris Mann
- Dennis Quaid as Jack Faulkner
- Gene Hackman as Lowell Kolchek
- Richard Dreyfuss as Dr. Frankenthal
- Rob Reiner as Joe Pierce
- Mary Wickes as Grandma
- Conrad Bain as Grandpa
- Annette Bening as Evelyn Ames
- Simon Callow as Simon Asquith
- Gary Morton as Marty Wiener
- CCH Pounder as Julie Marsden
- Robin Bartlett as Aretha
- Barbara Garrick as Carol
- Anthony Heald as George Lazan
- Dana Ivey as Wardrobe Mistress
- Oliver Platt as Neil Bleene
- Michael Ontkean as Robert Munch

Fisher said in the DVD commentary that Jerry Orbach filmed a scene as Suzanne's father, which was later cut.

== Production ==
In discussing adapting the book for the screen, director Mike Nichols commented, "For quite a long time we pushed pieces around, but then we went with the central story of a mother passing the baton to her daughter." He added, "Carrie doesn't draw on her life any more than Flaubert did. It's just that his life wasn't so well known."

Nichols began pre-production in New York, where he assembled a group of actors to run lines from the script in order to perfect it. In return, the actors, including Annette Bening, were given small roles in the film when it filmed.

Responding to questions about how closely the film's relationship between Suzanne and Doris parallels her relationship with her mother, Debbie Reynolds, Carrie Fisher stated, "I wrote about a mother actress and a daughter actress. I'm not shocked that people think it's about me and my mother. It's easier for them to think I have no imagination for language, just a tape recorder with endless batteries." In the DVD commentary, she notes that her mother wanted to portray Doris, but Nichols cast Shirley MacLaine instead. In her 2013 autobiography, Unsinkable, Reynolds recounted that Nichols told her, "You're not right for the part."

Blue Rodeo accompanied Meryl Streep on "I'm Checkin' Out", written by Shel Silverstein. Other songs performed in the film include "I'm Still Here" (sung by MacLaine) and "You Don't Know Me" (sung by Streep).

== Reception ==
=== Box office ===
The film opened in 1,013 theaters in the United States and Canada on September 14, 1990, and grossed $7,871,856 during its opening weekend, ranking number one at the U.S. box office. It eventually grossed $39,071,603 in the U.S. and Canada and $24.3 million internationally, for a worldwide total of $63.4 million.

=== Critical response ===
On the website Rotten Tomatoes, the film holds an approval rating of 83% based on 87 reviews, with an average rating of 7.4/10. The website's critics consensus reads, "Uniting a pair of powerhouse talents with a smart, sharply written script, Postcards from the Edge makes compelling drama out of reality-inspired trauma." Metacritic, which uses a weighted average, assigned the film a score of 71 out of 100, based on 18 critics, indicating "generally favorable" reviews. Audiences polled by CinemaScore gave the film an average grade of "A−" on an A+ to F scale.

Vincent Canby of The New York Times said the film "seems to have been a terrifically genial collaboration between the writer and the director, Miss Fisher's tale of odd-ball woe being the perfect material for Mr. Nichols's particular ability to discover the humane sensibility within the absurd."

Roger Ebert of the Chicago Sun-Times observed, "What's disappointing about the movie is that it never really delivers on the subject of recovery from addiction. There are some incomplete, dimly seen, unrealized scenes in the rehab center, and then desultory talk about offscreen AA meetings. But the film is preoccupied with gossip; we're encouraged to wonder how many parallels there are between the Streep and MacLaine characters and their originals, Fisher and Debbie Reynolds... Postcards from the Edge contains too much good writing and too many good performances to be a failure, but its heart is not in the right place."

Hal Hinson of The Washington Post said, "Meryl Streep gives the most fully articulated comic performance of her career, the one she's always hinted at and made us hope for." He felt the film's earlier section was "the movie's best, primarily because Nichols is so focused on Streep. In fact, almost nothing else seems to matter to him... But while Nichols is servicing his star, he lets the other areas of the film go slack... [He] is finely attuned to the natural surreality of a movie set, but when he moves away from the show-biz satire and concentrates on the mother-daughter relationship, the movie falters."

=== Accolades ===
Award	Category	Recipient(s)	Result
Academy Awards	Best Actress	Meryl Streep	Nominated
Academy Awards	Best Original Song	"I'm Checkin' Out"; Music and Lyrics by Shel Silverstein	Nominated
American Comedy Awards	Funniest Actress in a Motion Picture (Leading Role)	Meryl Streep	Won
American Comedy Awards	Funniest Supporting Actress in a Motion Picture	Shirley MacLaine	Nominated
Artios Awards	Outstanding Achievement in Feature Film Casting – Comedy	Juliet Taylor	Nominated
British Academy Film Awards	Best Actress in a Leading Role	Shirley MacLaine	Nominated
British Academy Film Awards	Best Adapted Screenplay	Carrie Fisher	Nominated
British Academy Film Awards	Best Original Film Score	Carly Simon	Nominated
Dallas–Fort Worth Film Critics Association Awards	Best Actress	Meryl Streep	Nominated
Golden Globe Awards	Best Actress in a Motion Picture – Musical or Comedy	Meryl Streep	Nominated
Golden Globe Awards	Best Supporting Actress – Motion Picture	Shirley MacLaine	Nominated
Golden Globe Awards	Best Original Song – Motion Picture	"I'm Checkin' Out"; Music and Lyrics by Shel Silverstein	Nominated
London Film Critics' Circle Awards	Newcomer of the Year	Annette Bening	Won
