= List of Dune characters =

Characters from Denis Villeneuve's Dune (2021). From left to right: Chani (Zendaya), Gurney Halleck (Josh Brolin), Lady Jessica (Rebecca Ferguson), Stilgar (Javier Bardem), Paul Atreides (Timothée Chalamet), Duncan Idaho (Jason Momoa), Liet-Kynes (Sharon Duncan-Brewster) and Leto Atreides (Oscar Isaac).

Dune is a science fiction media franchise that originated with the 1965 novel of the same name by American author Frank Herbert. Dune is frequently cited as the best-selling science fiction novel in history, and won the 1966 Hugo Award as well as the inaugural Nebula Award for Best Novel. Herbert wrote five sequels before his death in 1986: Dune Messiah (1969), Children of Dune (1976), God Emperor of Dune (1981), Heretics of Dune (1984), and Chapterhouse: Dune (1985).

Dune follows Paul, the scion of House Atreides, as his family is thrown into the dangerous political intrigues centered on the desert planet Arrakis, only known source of the oracular spice melange, the most important and valuable substance in the universe. The series spans 5,000 years, focusing on Paul and then his various descendants.

Dune was adapted as a 1984 film, and again in two parts, the films Dune (2021) and Dune: Part Two (2024). Additionally, the novel was adapted as a 2000 television miniseries, Frank Herbert's Dune, and the first two sequels were also adapted as a single miniseries, Frank Herbert's Children of Dune, in 2003.

Since 1999, Frank Herbert's son Brian Herbert and science fiction author Kevin J. Anderson have published 15 prequel novels, collected in the series Prelude to Dune (1999–2001), Legends of Dune (2002–2004), Heroes of Dune (2008–2023), Great Schools of Dune (2012–2016), and The Caladan Trilogy (2020–2022). They have also released two sequel novels—Hunters of Dune (2006) and Sandworms of Dune (2007)—which complete the original series.

== Overview ==
Character	Novels						Adaptations					
Character	Dune (1965)	Dune Messiah (1969)	Children of Dune (1976)	God Emperor of Dune (1981)	Heretics of Dune (1984)	Chapterhouse: Dune (1985)	Dune (1984 film)	Dune (2000 miniseries)	Children of Dune (2003 miniseries)	Dune (2021 film)	Dune: Part Two (2024 film)	Dune: Part Three (2026 film)
Paul Atreides	Yes	Yes	Yes				Kyle MacLachlan	Alec Newman	Alec Newman	Timothée Chalamet	Timothée Chalamet	Timothée Chalamet
Lady Jessica	Yes		Yes				Francesca Annis	Saskia Reeves	Alice Krige	Rebecca Ferguson	Rebecca Ferguson	Rebecca Ferguson
Leto I Atreides	Yes						Jürgen Prochnow	William Hurt		Oscar Isaac		
Vladimir Harkonnen	Yes		Yes				Kenneth McMillan	Ian McNeice	Ian McNeice	Stellan Skarsgård	Stellan Skarsgård	
Chani	Yes	Yes					Sean Young	Barbora Kodetová	Barbora Kodetová	Zendaya	Zendaya	Zendaya
Stilgar	Yes		Yes				Everett McGill	Uwe Ochsenknecht	Steven Berkoff	Javier Bardem	Javier Bardem	Javier Bardem
Gaius Helen Mohiam	Yes	Yes					Siân Phillips	Zuzana Geislerová	Zuzana Geislerová	Charlotte Rampling	Charlotte Rampling	Charlotte Rampling
Duncan Idaho	Yes	Yes	Yes	Yes	Yes	Yes	Richard Jordan	James Watson	Edward Atterton	Jason Momoa		Jason Momoa
Wellington Yueh	Yes						Dean Stockwell	Robert Russell		Chang Chen		
Gurney Halleck	Yes		Yes				Patrick Stewart	P. H. Moriarty	P. H. Moriarty	Josh Brolin	Josh Brolin	Josh Brolin
Feyd-Rautha	Yes						Sting	Matt Keeslar			Austin Butler	
Glossu Rabban	Yes						Paul Smith	László I. Kish		Dave Bautista	Dave Bautista	
Princess Irulan	Yes	Yes	Yes				Virginia Madsen	Julie Cox	Julie Cox		Florence Pugh	Florence Pugh
Shaddam IV	Yes						José Ferrer	Giancarlo Giannini			Christopher Walken	
Thufir Hawat	Yes						Freddie Jones	Jan Vlasák		Stephen McKinley Henderson		
Count Fenring	Yes							Miroslav Táborský				
Margot Fenring	Yes										Léa Seydoux	
Piter De Vries	Yes						Brad Dourif	Jan Unger		David Dastmalchian		
Alia Atreides	Yes	Yes	Yes				Alicia Witt	Laura Burton	Daniela Amavia		Anya Taylor-Joy	Anya Taylor-Joy
Shadout Mapes	Yes						Linda Hunt	Jaroslava Šiktancová		Golda Rosheuvel		
Liet-Kynes	Yes						Max von Sydow	Karel Dobrý		Sharon Duncan-Brewster		
Ramallo	Yes						Silvana Mangano	Drahomira Fialkova			Giusi Merli	
Jamis	Yes						Judd Omen	Christopher Lee Brown		Babs Olusanmokun	Babs Olusanmokun	
Harah	Yes	Yes	Yes				Molly Wrynn					
Otheym	Yes	Yes					Honorato Magalone	Jakob Schwarz	Jakob Schwarz			
Korba	Yes	Yes							Karel Dobrý			
Aramsham	Yes											
Iakin Nefud	Yes						Jack Nance					
Scytale		Yes			Yes	Yes	Leonardo Cimino		Martin McDougall			Robert Pattinson
Edric		Yes							Terrence Stone			
Bijaz		Yes							Gee Williams			
Lichna		Yes							Klára Issová			
Farok		Yes							Ivo Novák			
Princess Wensicia			Yes						Susan Sarandon			
Leto II Atreides			Yes	Yes					James McAvoy			Nakoa-Wolf Momoa
Ghanima Atreides			Yes						Jessica Brooks			Ida Brooke
Tyekanik			Yes						Marek Vašut			
Farad'n			Yes						Jonathan Brüün			
Ziarenko Javid			Yes						Rik Young			
Siona Atreides				Yes								
Hwi Noree				Yes								
Anteac				Yes								
Moneo Atreides				Yes								
Nayla				Yes								
Chenoeh				Yes								
Luyseyal				Yes								
Lucilla					Yes	Yes						
Miles Teg					Yes	Yes						
Murbella					Yes	Yes						
Darwi Odrade					Yes	Yes						
Sheeana Brugh					Yes	Yes						
Tylwyth Waff					Yes	Yes						
Bellonda					Yes	Yes						
Alma Mavis Taraza					Yes							
Alef Burzmali					Yes							
Hedley Tuek					Yes							
Daniel and Marty						Yes						
Dama						Yes						
Logno						Yes						

== Introduced in Dune (1965) ==
=== Paul Atreides ===
In Dune, Paul is the son and heir of Duke Leto Atreides and Lady Jessica, whose family is thrown into the dangerous political intrigues centered on the inhospitable desert planet Arrakis, only known source of the oracular spice melange, the most important and valuable substance in the universe. Paul has been trained by his father and several Atreides attendants in fighting and the art of war, and by his mother in some of her Bene Gesserit disciplines. Paul also possesses burgeoning prescient abilities, which are further unlocked by the inescapable exposure to melange on Arrakis. House Atreides is soon betrayed and scattered, with Leto killed, his forces devastated, and Paul and Jessica forced to flee into the open desert. They are taken in by the native Fremen, a secretive population of fierce fighters who thrive despite the scarcity of water and presence of aggressive, giant sandworms. Paul rises to lead the planetwide Fremen forces against the Imperial stranglehold over Arrakis, ultimately seizing control of the planet and deposing Padishah Emperor Shaddam IV. In Dune Messiah, Paul's empire is challenged by the conspiracies of various factions hoping to destroy him, while a jihad in his name rages across the universe. After he is blinded by a devastating weapon known as a stone burner, Paul exiles himself into the desert, per Fremen custom. Paul returns under the guise of "The Preacher" in Children of Dune, rallying against the Fremen religion and the jihad raging in his name. The Preacher is ultimately assassinated by one of Alia's guards after calling her a blasphemer.

Paul is portrayed by Kyle MacLachlan in the 1984 film adaptation Dune, and by Alec Newman in the 2000 miniseries Frank Herbert's Dune and its 2003 sequel, Frank Herbert's Children of Dune. The character is played by Timothée Chalamet in the 2021 film Dune and its sequel, Dune: Part Two (2024).

=== Lady Jessica ===
In Dune, Lady Jessica is the concubine of Duke Leto and the mother of his son Paul and daughter Alia. Jessica is one of the Bene Gesserit, a secretive, matriarchal order who achieve superhuman abilities through physical and mental conditioning and the use of the drug melange. Instructed by the Bene Gesserit to first conceive a daughter with Leto to further the order's centuries-long breeding program, she disobeyed out of love for Leto, and gave him a son. This seemingly minor misstep puts the Atreides bloodline on a collision course with events that will ultimately change the fate of the universe. Pregnant with Alia, Jessica flees into the desert with Paul as House Atreides is all but destroyed by the forces of the wicked Baron Vladimir Harkonnen. Finding refuge with the native Fremen, she and Paul take advantage of the legends planted there by Bene Gesserit religious engineering, casting themselves as the prophesied messiah and his mother. Jessica undergoes the Fremen version of the Bene Gesserit spice agony ritual, becoming a Reverend Mother and unlocking Other Memory, the personas and memories of all her female ancestors. But doing so while pregnant subjects the unborn Alia to an onslaught of heightened awareness for which her fragile consciousness is not prepared. Jessica returns to Arrakis in Children of Dune and recognizes that Alia, who serves as regent for Paul and Chani's twin children, Leto II and Ghanima, has succumbed to the dangers of her unique birth and become possessed. Jessica escapes an assassination attempt by Alia, and trains Farad'n, the grandson of Shaddam IV, in the Bene Gesserit way.

Lady Jessica is portrayed by Francesca Annis in the 1984 film. Saskia Reeves plays the role in the 2000 miniseries, and is succeeded by Alice Krige in its 2003 sequel. Rebecca Ferguson portrays Jessica in the 2021 film and its 2024 sequel.

=== Leto I Atreides ===
Leto I Atreides
- Dune character
- First appearance: Dune (1965)
- Created by: Frank Herbert
- Portrayed by: Jürgen Prochnow (1984 film); William Hurt (2000 series); Oscar Isaac (2021 film)

In-universe information
- Title(s): Duke and planetary governor of Caladan and Arrakis
- Family: House Atreides
- Significant other: Lady Jessica (concubine)
- Children: Paul Atreides (son); Alia Atreides (daughter); Leto II Atreides (grandson); Ghanima Atreides (granddaughter)
- Prequel relatives: Kailea Vernius (concubine); Victor Atreides (son); Paulus Atreides (father); Helena Richese (mother)

Duke Leto Atreides is the planetary governor of the ocean planet Caladan who takes over the lucrative spice mining operations on the desert planet Arrakis at the behest of the Padishah Emperor Shaddam IV. Knowing it is some kind of trap but unable to refuse the assignment, Leto proactively seeks an alliance with the native Fremen, people tempered by the planet's harsh conditions who Leto realizes are an underestimated and untapped resource. He is accompanied to Arrakis by his Bene Gesserit concubine Lady Jessica, with whom he is in love but has not married to allow for the possibility of a politically advantageous marriage, and his son and heir, Paul. Threatened by Leto's growing influence among the Landsraad assembly of noble families, Shaddam has aligned himself with Leto's enemy, the Baron Harkonnen. The Harkonnens, secretly bolstered by Shaddam's fierce Sardaukar warriors and aided by Leto's own personal physician, the Suk doctor Wellington Yueh, launch an attack that devastates the Atreides forces. Leto is taken prisoner by the Baron, and dies attempting to kill him.

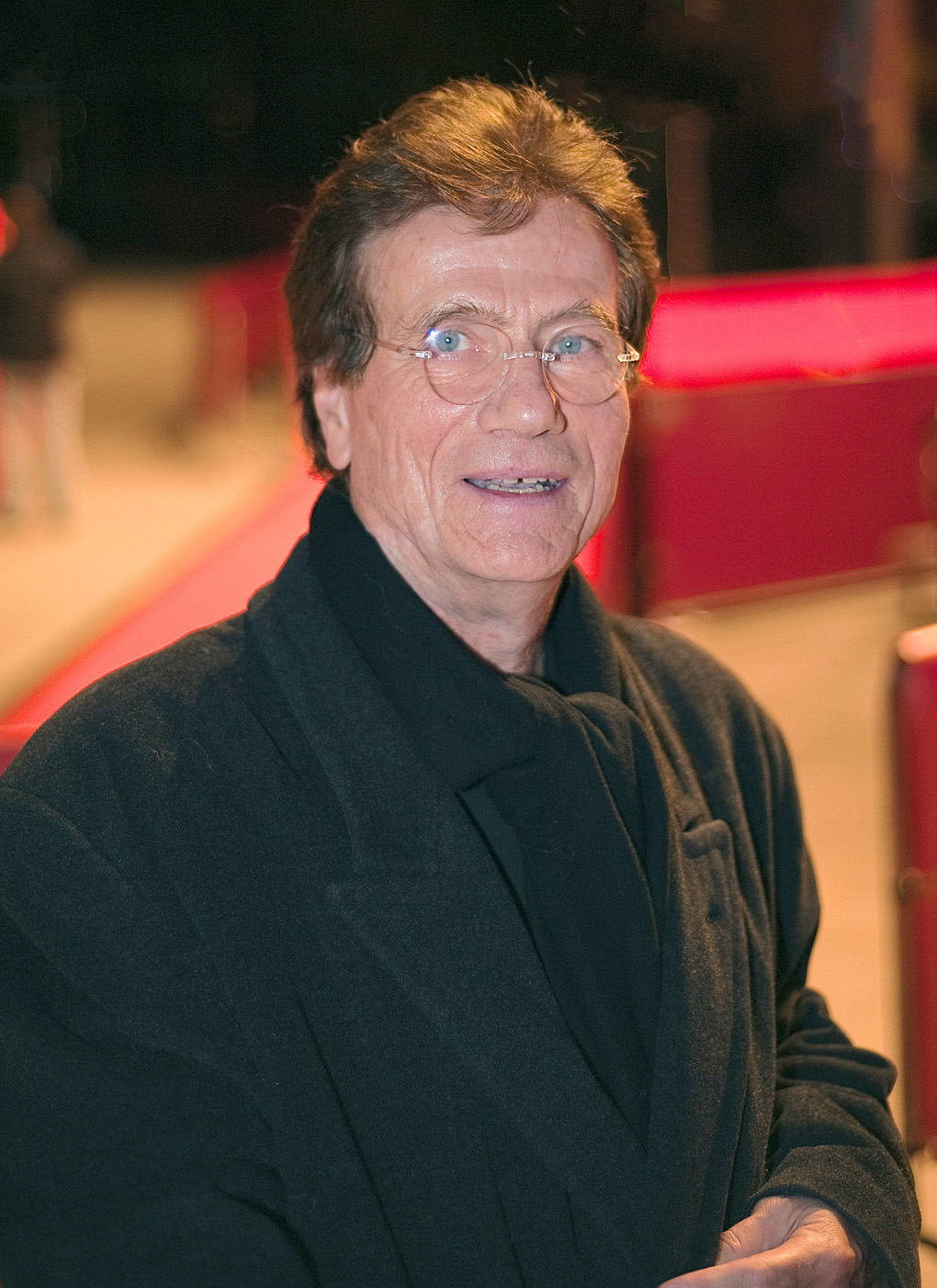
Jürgen Prochnow portrays Leto in the 1984 film.

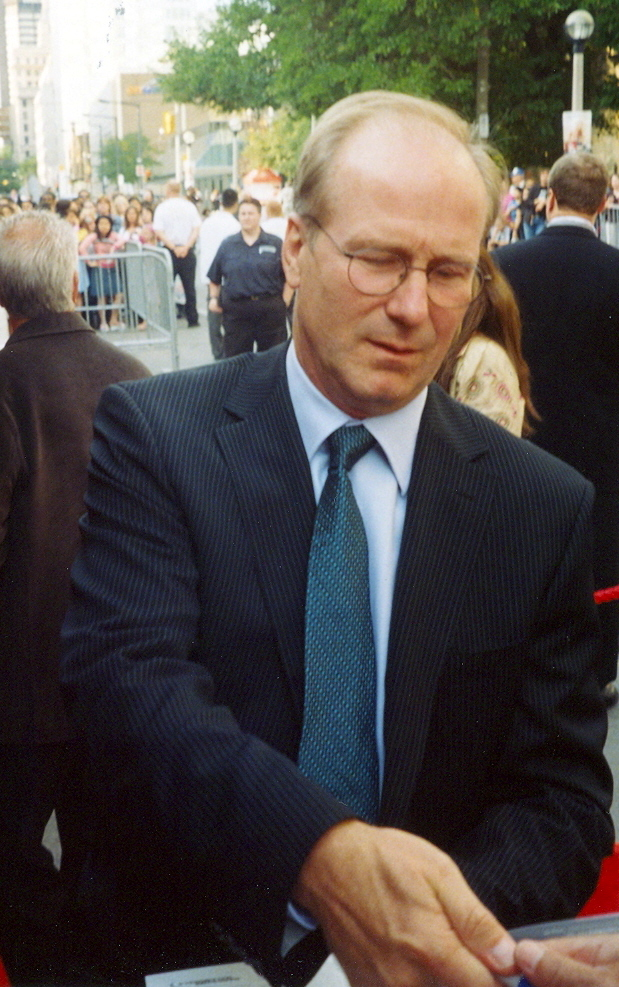
William Hurt portrays Leto in the 2000 miniseries.

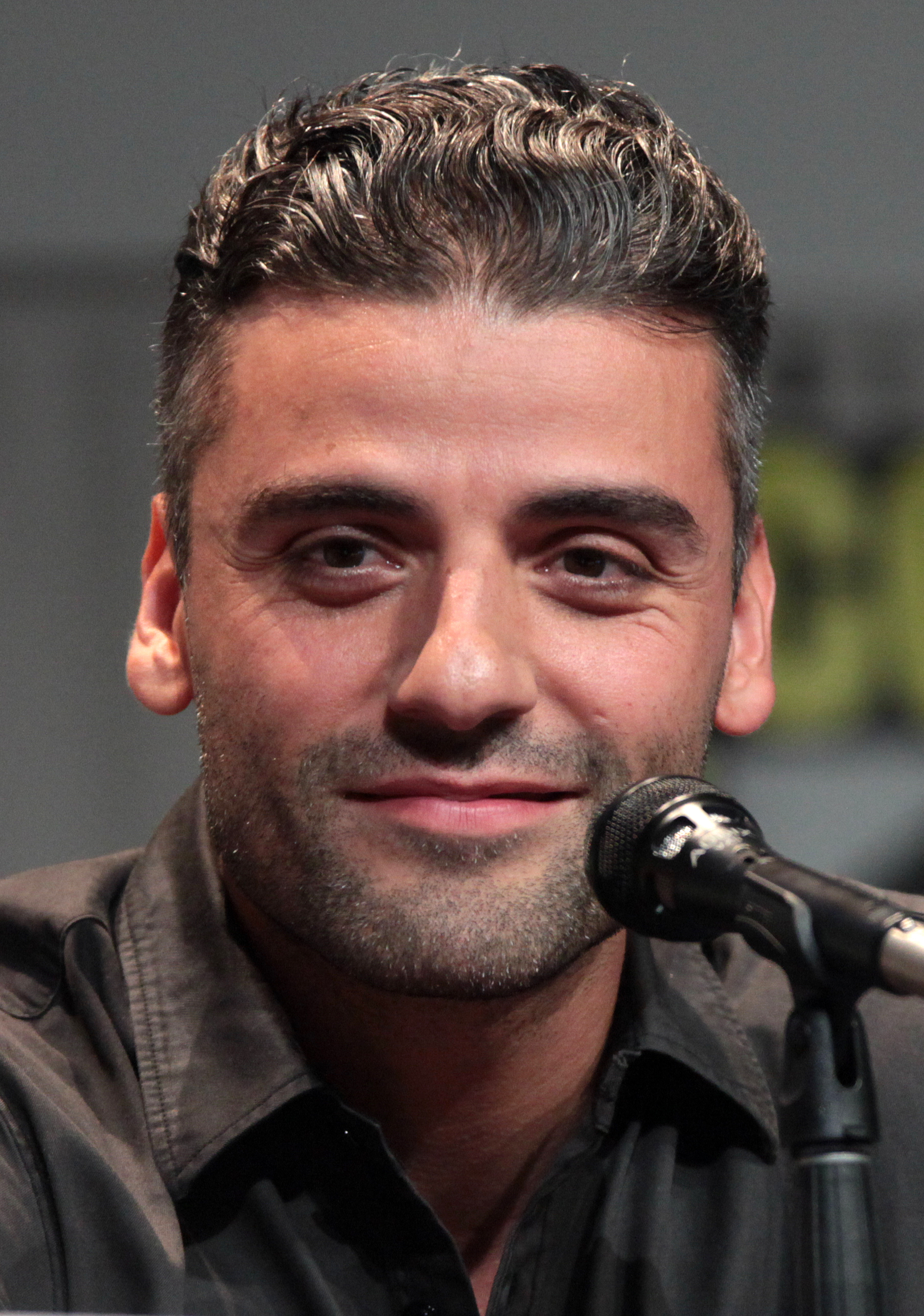
Oscar Isaac portrays Leto in the 2021 film.

The character has been described as "regal and doomed", and "warmly protective but all-too-vulnerable".

Leto is portrayed by Jürgen Prochnow in the 1984 film. Ben Sherlock of Screen Rant called Prochnow "mesmerizing" in the role, with "a commanding screen presence" that "brought slightly more grit" than subsequent portrayals. William Hurt plays Leto in the 2000 miniseries. Hurt was the first actor to be cast in the 2000 adaptation. A fan of the novel, he told The New York Times, "I was a science fiction junkie ... [Director John Harrison] captured Herbert's prophetic reflection of our own age, where nation-states are competing with the new global economy and its corporate elements." Emmet Asher-Perrin of Tor.com wrote that Hurt "brings a certain reserved calm that works for the character." Leto is portrayed by Oscar Isaac in the 2021 film. Chaim Gartenberg of The Verge wrote, "Isaac exudes a sense of righteous honor, and it's easy to see both why his men would follow him to a forsaken desert world and why he falls so thoroughly into the political traps."

In 2020, Funko produced a Duke Leto figure as part of their POP! Television line. It is a 4.5-inch (11 cm) vinyl figure in the Japanese chibi style, depicting Leto in armor and styled after the 2021 Denis Villeneuve film. Aug Toys also released a 1/6 scale, 30 cm tall figurine of the Isaac version of Leto. In February 2024, a Lego Dune playset based on the Atreides ornithopter from the 2021 Dune film was released, containing a Leto Atreides Lego minifigure.

Leto is also a primary character in the prequel trilogies Prelude to Dune and The Caladan Trilogy by Brian Herbert and Kevin J. Anderson. In Prelude to Dune, young Leto's mother, Helena, arranges for his father, expert bullfighter Duke Paulus Atreides, to be killed by a drugged Salusan bull so she can rule Caladan as Leto's regent. He exiles his mother to a distant convent to avoid the scandal of a public execution, and as duke takes Kailea Vernius of the industrial planet Ix as his concubine. They have a son, Victor, but grow apart, and Kailea's resentment and insecurities build. Threatened by Leto's attraction to the Bene Gesserit acolyte Jessica, Kailea attempts to kill him, but in the ensuing accident her brother Rhombur is critically injured and Victor is killed. Kailea commits suicide, and Leto takes Jessica as his concubine. Though instructed by the Bene Gesserit to bear the mourning Leto a daughter, Jessica intentionally conceives the son he desires, Paul. Leto surrounds himself with loyal and capable individuals, and comes to be known as an effective politician, a fair and just statesman, and a capable leader of his small military. The new Padishah Emperor, Shaddam IV, both admires Leto and dislikes him as a political rival. Leto's military victory over the Tleilaxu forces occupying Ix, and his role in the subsequent political censure of Shaddam, ensure Leto a vengeful enemy in the emperor.

=== Vladimir Harkonnen ===
Baron Vladimir Harkonnen is the ruthless and cunning head of House Harkonnen, centuries-old enemies of House Atreides. The Baron's intent to exterminate the Atreides line seems close to fruition as Duke Leto is lured to Arrakis on the pretense of taking over the lucrative spice mining operation there, previously controlled by the Harkonnens. The Baron has coerced Leto's own physician, the trusted Suk doctor Wellington Yueh, to be his agent in the Atreides household. Yueh disables the protective shields around the Atreides palace and the Harkonnen forces (secretly supplemented by the seemingly unstoppable Imperial Sardaukar warriors) attack. Yueh gives a captive Leto the means to assassinate the Baron, who survives the attempt as Leto dies. Escaping into the desert and later presumed dead, Leto's son Paul reveals to his mother, Lady Jessica, that the Baron is her father. The Baron's succession plan is to install his charismatic yet deadly younger nephew, Feyd-Rautha, as ruler of Arrakis after a period of tyrannical misrule by his brutish elder nephew, Glossu Rabban, making Feyd appear to be the savior of the people. A crisis on Arrakis begins when the mysterious Muad'Dib emerges as a leader of the native Fremen tribes, uniting them against Harkonnen rule. Eventually, a series of Fremen victories against Rabban threaten to disrupt the trade of the spice, attracting the attention of Shaddam IV himself. The emperor arrives on Arrakis with several legions of his Sardaukar, and he and the Baron are shocked to discover that the Fremen warlord Muad'Dib is actually Paul Atreides. The Fremen, previously underestimated by the Harkonnens, overcome the Imperial and Harkonnen forces thanks to Paul's military strategy, their own ferocity and their ability to use sandstorms and the giant sandworms of Arrakis to their advantage. Paul's sister Alia, four years old but born a fully aware Fremen Reverend Mother, reveals to the Baron that he is her grandfather before she kills him with a poisoned needle called a gom jabbar.

In Children of Dune, Alia succumbs to the dangers of her unique birth and is possessed by the persona of the deceased Baron Harkonnen. As he promises his assistance in quelling the multitude of other ancestral voices assailing her, Alia gradually relinquishes control of herself to the Baron, and descends into depravity and a lust for power sure to destroy the Atreides empire from within. Eventually realizing that the Baron's consciousness has surpassed her abilities to contain him, Alia commits suicide, killing the Baron in the process.

Baron Harkonnen is portrayed by Kenneth McMillan in the 1984 film, and by Ian McNeice in the 2000 miniseries and its 2003 sequel. Stellan Skarsgård portrays the character in the 2021 film and its 2024 sequel.

=== Chani ===
Chani is the daughter of Liet-Kynes, the Imperial Planetologist on Arrakis, and his Fremen wife Faroula. In Dune, Paul Atreides sees Chani in his prescient dreams before his family moves from Caladan to Arrakis. Later, Paul and his mother Jessica flee the Harkonnen attack that kills his father and devastates the Atreides forces, and are reluctantly taken in by a tribe of the planet's native desert people, the Fremen. Chani, a fierce warrior, is assigned to protect and guide Paul in the Fremen ways. They soon become lovers, and Paul, now known as Muad'Dib, rises as a military and religious leader among the Fremen. Their rebellion against the Harkonnens intensifies, and Paul and Chani's infant son is murdered in a Sardaukar raid. The Fremen overcome the Imperial and Harkonnen forces thanks to Paul's military strategy, their own ferocity and their ability to use sandstorms and the giant sandworms of Arrakis to their advantage. With his absolute control over Arrakis and the spice, Paul deposes Padishah Emperor Shaddam IV, marrying his daughter Princess Irulan to secure the throne. He vows that Chani will always be his only love, and mother of his children.

Twelve years later in Dune Messiah, Paul and Chani remain childless. Irulan, Bene Gesserit-trained and doing their bidding, has been secretly feeding Chani contraceptives to prevent her from conceiving an Imperial heir. The Sisterhood are desperate to regain control of Paul's bloodline for their breeding program, and are fearful of the effect Chani's "wild" genes may have on their offspring. But when Chani begins an ancient Fremen fertility diet high in melange, Irulan loses her ability to interfere, and Chani becomes pregnant. Chani ultimately discovers not only Irulan's role in her infertility but the fact that the contraceptives have caused permanent damage and will jeopardize her pregnancy. Chani seeks to kill Irulan, but Paul forbids it. He is secretly somewhat grateful to Irulan, as he has seen through his prescience that childbirth will bring Chani's death, and so Irulan has unwittingly extended Chani's life. Chani dies after giving birth to Paul's twin children, Leto II and Ghanima. Having proven their ability to do so, the Tleilaxu offer to resurrect Chani as a ghola in exchange for control of the empire, but Paul refuses. Through his oracular sight, Paul has seen that Chani's death during childbirth is far less painful and cruel than her possible future fates had she survived.

Chani is portrayed by actress Sean Young in the 1984 film, and by Barbora Kodetová in the 2000 miniseries and its 2003 sequel. Zendaya portrays the character in the 2021 film and its 2024 sequel.

=== Stilgar ===
Stilgar
- Dune character
- First appearance: Dune (1965)
- Created by: Frank Herbert
- Portrayed by: Everett McGill (1984 film); Uwe Ochsenknecht (2000 series); Steven Berkoff (2003 sequel); Javier Bardem (2021 film / 2024 sequel)

In-universe information
- Title: Naib of Sietch Tabr
- Affiliation: Fremen; House Atreides
- Spouses: Tharthar; Harah

Stilgar is the Fremen leader, or naib, of Sietch Tabr. In Dune, Duke Leto Atreides sends his swordmaster, Duncan Idaho, to build a relationship with the mysterious native Fremen of Arrakis, people tempered by the planet's harsh conditions who Leto realizes are an underestimated and untapped resource. Leto allows Duncan, impressed with the Fremen and their ways, a dual loyalty to both the Atreides and Stilgar. When Leto's son Paul and his Bene Gesserit mother, Lady Jessica, flee a Harkonnen attack, they find refuge with Stilgar's tribe of Fremen. Paul, believed to be their prophesied messiah, comes to be known as Muad'Dib and rises as a military and religious leader among the Fremen.

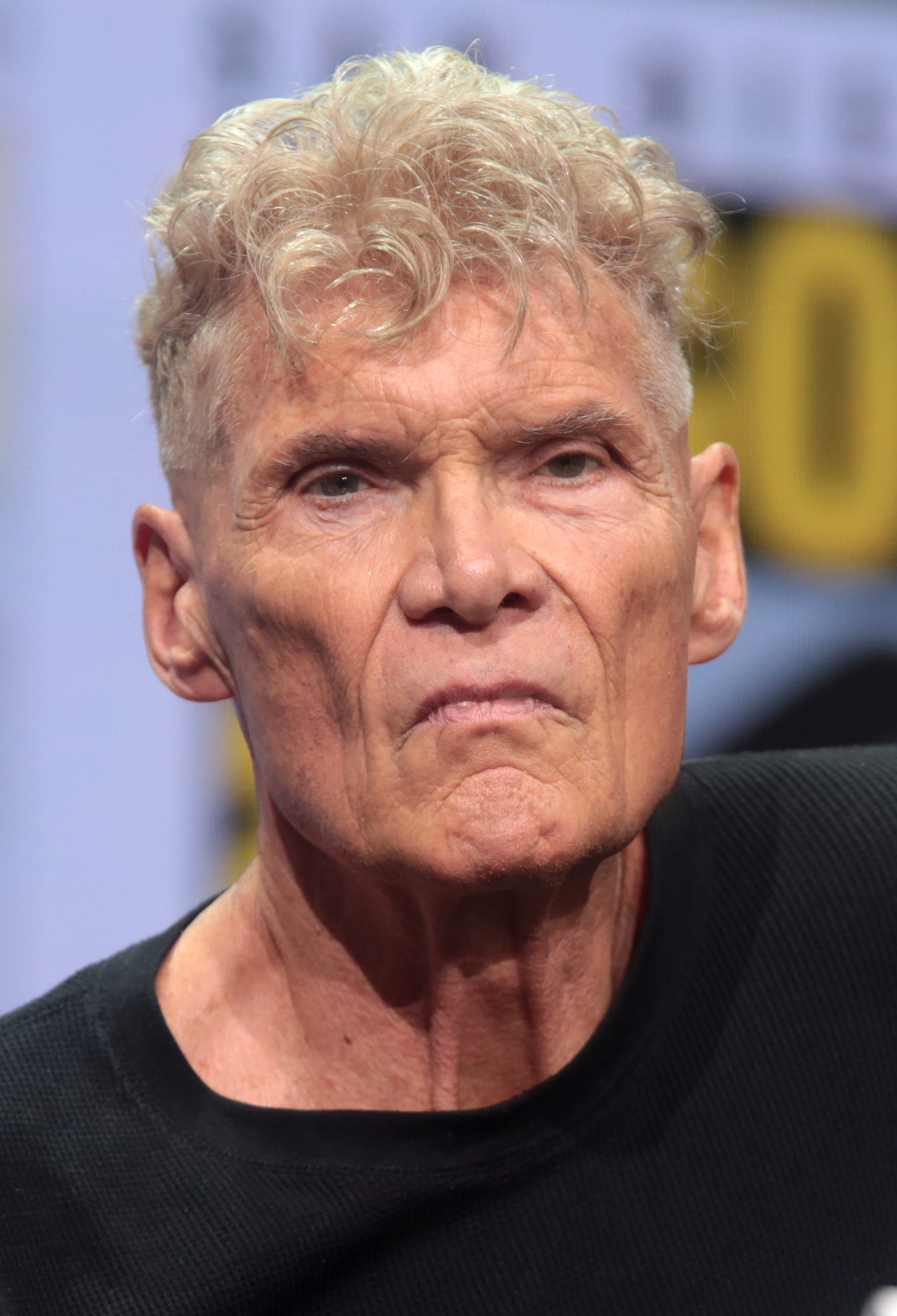
Everett McGill portrays Stilgar in the 1984 film.

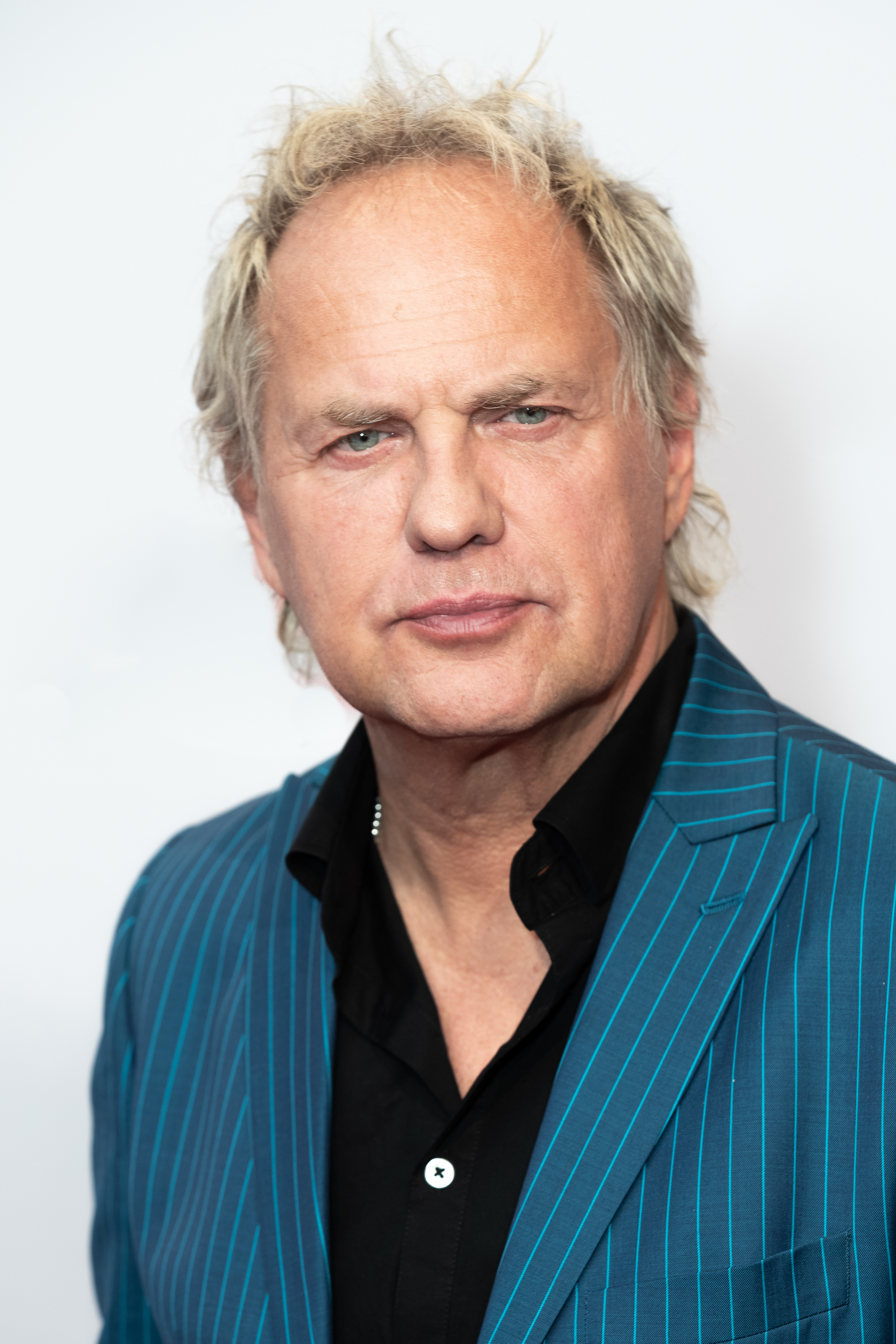
Uwe Ochsenknecht portrays Stilgar in the 2000 miniseries.

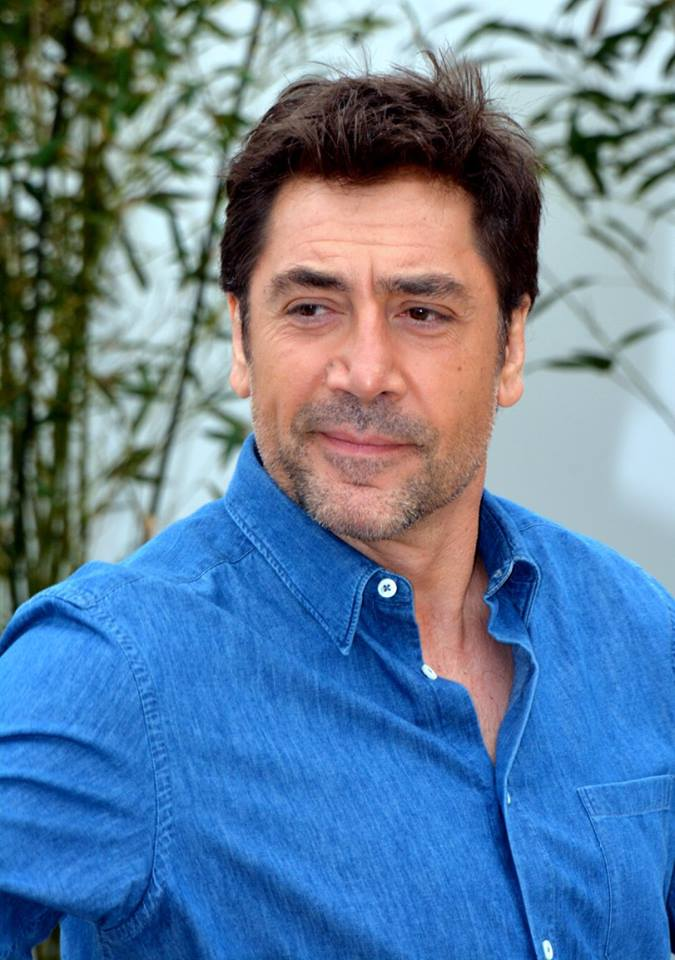
Javier Bardem portrays Stilgar in the 2021 film and its 2024 sequel.

Previously underestimated by the Harkonnens, the Fremen overcome the Imperial and Harkonnen forces that control Arrakis thanks to Paul's military strategy, their own ferocity and their ability to use sandstorms and the giant sandworms to their advantage. In Dune Messiah, Stilgar is a staunch supporter and protector of Paul, and one of his inner circle of advisors. In Children of Dune, Stilgar is fiercely loyal to Paul's young heirs Leto II and Ghanima, and is conflicted as the regent, Paul's sister Alia, descends into madness. Duncan manipulates Stilgar into killing him, knowing it will force Stilgar to join the rebellion against Alia. Later, with Leto presumed dead, Stilgar helps Ghanima and Princess Irulan escape Alia's tyranny.

Novelist Brian Herbert, Frank Herbert's son and biographer, wrote, "One time I asked my father if he identified with any of the characters in his stories, and to my surprise he said it was Stilgar, the rugged leader of the Fremen ... Mulling this over, I realized Stilgar was the equivalent of a Native American chief in Dune—a person who represented and defended time-honored ways that did not harm the ecology of the planet."

Stilgar is portrayed by Everett McGill in the 1984 film. Uwe Ochsenknecht plays the role in the 2000 miniseries, and is succeeded by Steven Berkoff in its 2003 sequel. Asher-Perrin called Ochsenknecht "a wonderfully gruff Stilgar", but later wrote, "Steven Berkoff is an incredible character actor, but there is nothing about him that even remotely invokes the old Fremen leader. Instead, he reads at the beginning like the Atreides family butler before moving onto Old British Wardog Supreme." Javier Bardem portrays Stilgar in the 2021 film and its 2024 sequel.

In 1984, toy company LJN released a line of Dune action figures, styled after David Lynch's film, which included a figure of Stilgar. McFarlane Toys released a 7" articulating action figure of Stilgar in 2020, styled after the 2021 Denis Villeneuve film. In 2022, Super7 released a 3.75" articulating Stilgar action figure as part of its Dune ReAction line, also styled after the Lynch film.

Stilgar's early life is explored in the Prelude to Dune prequel trilogy by Brian Herbert and Kevin J. Anderson, and he is resurrected as a ghola in the Brian Herbert/Anderson conclusion to the original series, Sandworms of Dune. The character also appears in the prequel novels Paul of Dune and The Winds of Dune.

=== Duncan Idaho ===
Duncan Idaho is the Swordmaster of House Atreides, and one of Paul's teachers. In Dune, Leto sends Duncan to build a relationship with the mysterious native Fremen of Arrakis, people tempered by the planet's harsh conditions who Leto realizes are an underestimated and untapped resource. Leto allows Duncan, impressed with the Fremen and their ways, a dual loyalty to both the Atreides and Stilgar, but he is later killed helping Paul and Jessica escape from the Harkonnens. Duncan is revived by the Bene Tleilax as the ghola Mentat Hayt in Dune Messiah, and works with Paul's sister Alia to unravel the conspiracy against the Atreides. The Tleilaxu have secretly programmed Hayt to seduce Alia, weaken Paul psychologically and then kill him. The trauma of the attempt restores his memories of being Duncan. He is married to Alia in Children of Dune, but she has succumbed to the dangers of her unique birth and become possessed by the persona of the deceased Baron Harkonnen. As Alia becomes more power-hungry and attempts to assassinate her mother Jessica, Duncan spirits Jessica and Paul's children Leto II and Ghanima away. He manipulates Fremen naib Stilgar, a loyal Atreides advisor, into killing him, knowing that the act will force Stilgar to join the rebellion against Alia or be executed by her out of political necessity.

Thirty-five hundred years later in God Emperor of Dune, a series of Duncan gholas provided by the Tleilaxu have served the seemingly immortal God Emperor Leto II Atreides one after the other. Most of these have been killed by Leto himself, as the serial Duncans, pledged to the Atreides in a time when justice reigned, tend to rebel against the hallmark tyranny and oppression of Leto's rule. The newest Duncan is as disillusioned as his predecessors, and after falling in love with the Ixian ambassador Hwi Noree (who is engaged to Leto), he joins Atreides descendant Siona in her plot to assassinate Leto. He allows them to succeed, and as he dies, Leto reveals that his millennia-long plan for humanity's ultimate survival—called the Golden Path—has come to fruition. Siona and her descendants will be invisible to prescient sight, and the end of his millennia of oppression will spark a mass diaspora of humankind which will come to be known as The Scattering.

Fifteen hundred years later, the Bene Gesserit become the consumers of Duncan gholas in Heretics of Dune and Chapterhouse Dune. The Sisterhood suspect that the Tleilaxu have implanted the gholas with some secret purpose, and when the latest Duncan regains his memories, he agrees. The Honored Matres, a violent matriarchal order with the ability to enslave men using their unique sexual talents, have arrived from the farthest reaches of the universe, wreaking havoc and destruction, and obliterating Tleilaxu worlds. An attempt by the Honored Matre Murbella to sexually imprint Duncan triggers the hidden Tleilaxu purpose: to conquer the Honored Matres by using a better version of their own sexual techniques. All the memories of the previous Duncans are unlocked in the current one as he and Murbella imprint each other. Addicted to each other, they are confined to a no-ship on the Bene Gesserit homeworld, Chapterhouse. There, Duncan trains other men to enslave Honored Matres, until he and Sheeana escape in the untraceable ship.

Duncan is portrayed by Richard Jordan in the 1984 film. James Watson plays the role in the 2000 miniseries, and is succeeded by Edward Atterton in its 2003 sequel. Jason Momoa portrays Duncan in the 2021 film.

=== Wellington Yueh ===
Dr. Wellington Yueh
- Dune character
- First appearance: Dune (1965)
- Created by: Frank Herbert
- Portrayed by: Dean Stockwell (1984 film); Robert Russell (2000 series); Chang Chen (2021 film)

In-universe information
- Occupation: Suk doctor
- Affiliation: Suk School; House Atreides
- Spouse: Wanna Marcus

Dr. Wellington Yueh is a Suk doctor and the trusted personal physician of Duke Leto Atreides. In Dune, Baron Vladimir Harkonnen is intent on the destruction of House Atreides, who have been lured to Arrakis on the pretense of taking over the valuable spice mining operation there. Though Suk Imperial Conditioning supposedly makes the subject incapable of inflicting harm, the Baron has taken Yueh's Bene Gesserit wife Wanna prisoner, threatening her with interminable torture unless Yueh complies with his demands. Aware of Yueh's conditioning and believing Wanna was killed by the Harkonnens, Leto's Mentat Thufir Hawat and concubine Lady Jessica are assured that the doctor is not a Harkonnen spy.

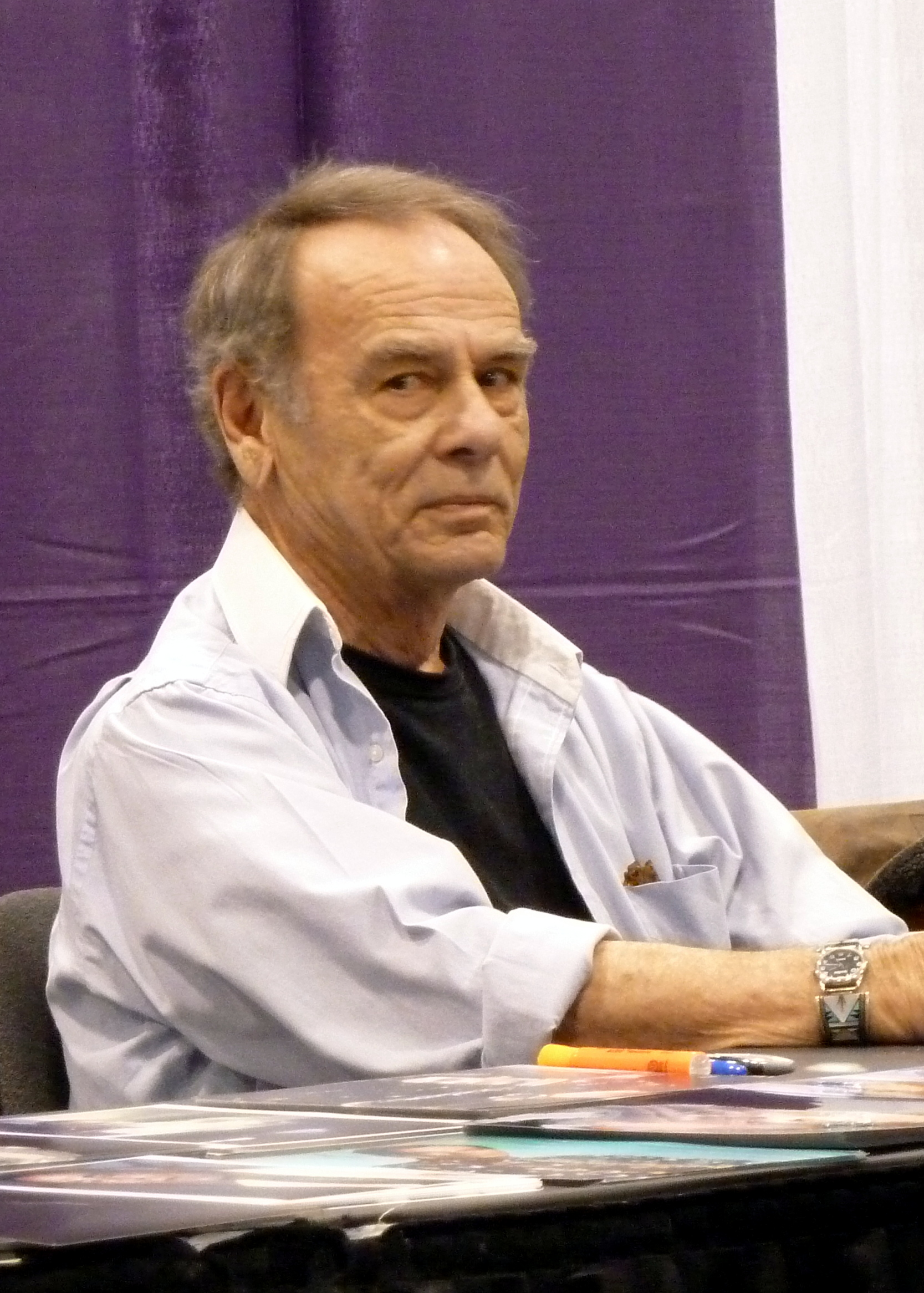
Dean Stockwell portrays Yueh in the 1984 film.

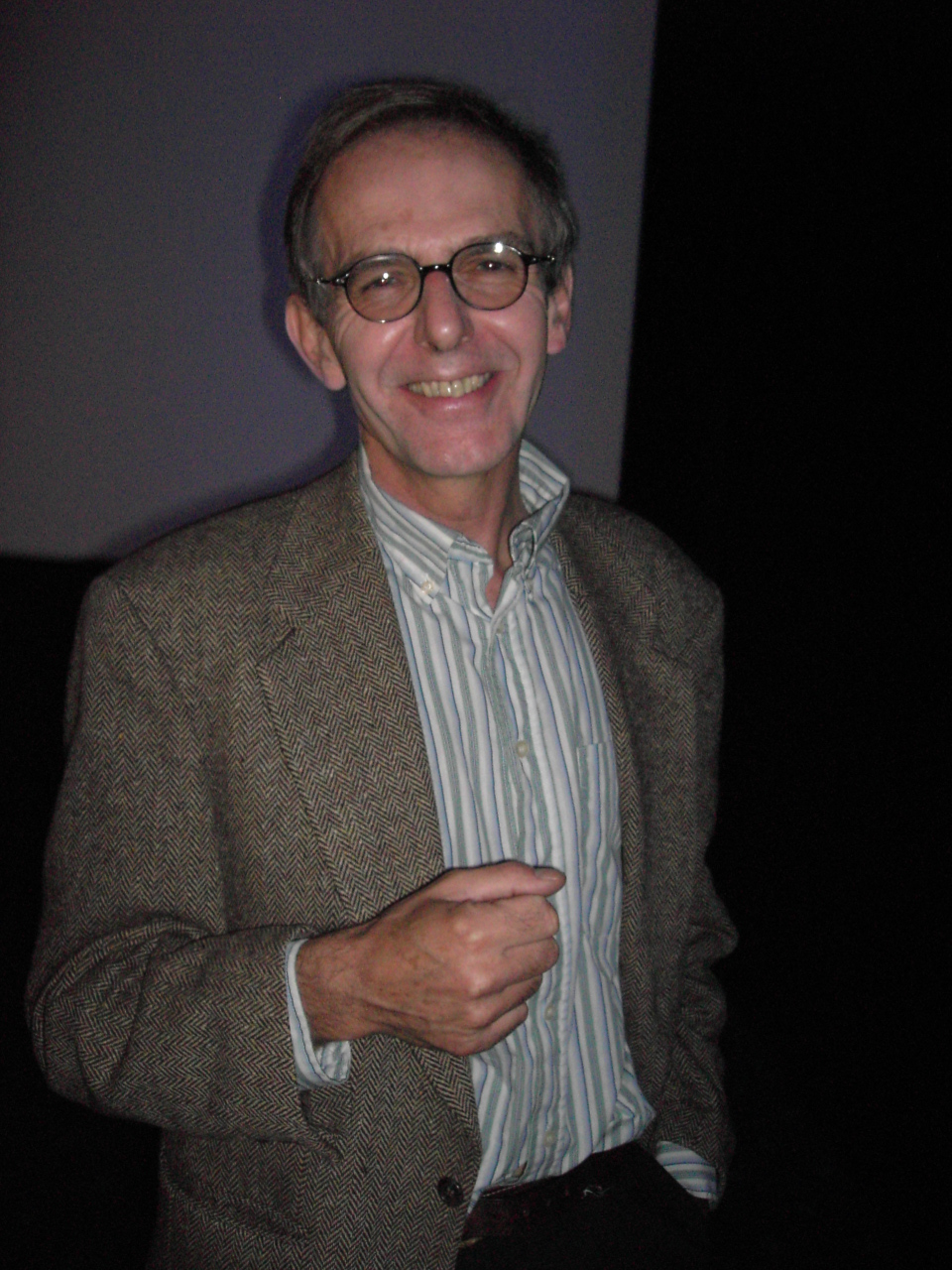
Robert Russell portrays Yueh in the 2000 miniseries.

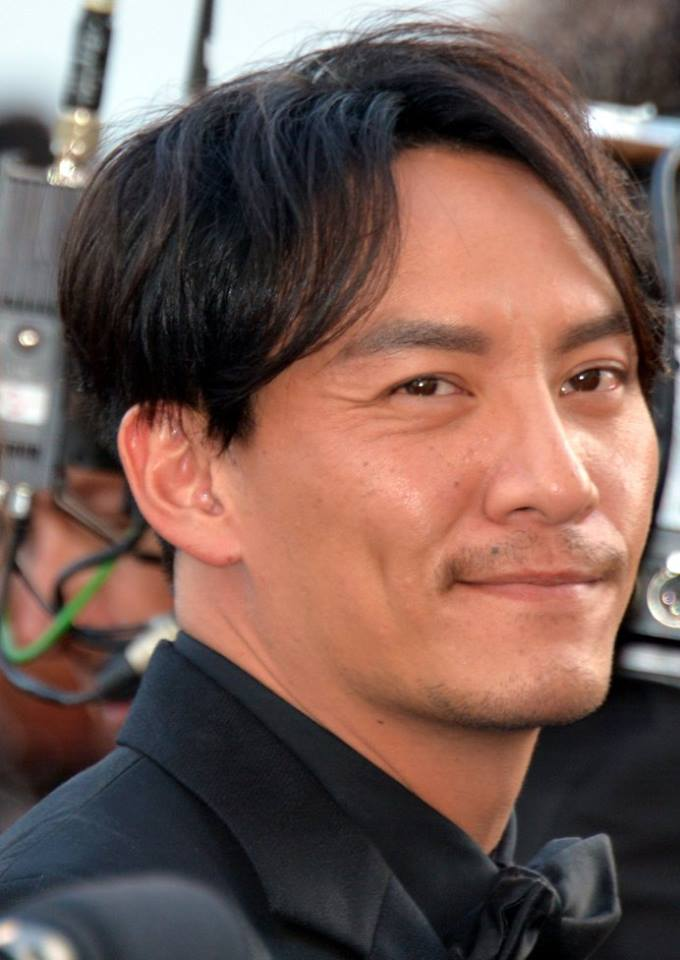
Chang Chen portrays Yueh in the 2021 film.

Yueh disables the protective shields around the Atreides palace on Arrakis, and the Harkonnen forces (secretly supplemented by the seemingly unstoppable Imperial Sardaukar warriors) attack. Yueh takes Leto prisoner, but desiring to slay the Baron in defiance of his conditioning, Yueh provides the captive Leto with a fake tooth filled with poisonous gas as a means to kill the Baron, though Leto would die as well. Upon delivering Leto, Yueh confirms his belief that Wanna is already dead, moments before the Baron's twisted Mentat Piter De Vries kills him. The Baron escapes the poison, which only kills Leto and De Vries. Leto's son Paul flees into the desert with Jessica, aided by survival kits left for them by a compassionate Yueh.

Yueh is portrayed by Dean Stockwell in the 1984 film, and by Robert Russell in the 2000 miniseries. Chang Chen plays the character in the 2021 film.

The character also appears in the Prelude to Dune prequel trilogy by Brian Herbert and Kevin J. Anderson, and is resurrected as a ghola in Hunters of Dune and Sandworms of Dune, the Brian Herbert/Anderson sequels which conclude the original series. In Prelude to Dune, a younger Baron Harkonnen consults with Yueh seeking a cure for the debilitating disease which is slowly but surely rendering him obese. Yueh is aware of no cure, but correctly suggests that the disease's source may be the Bene Gesserit. The early years of Yueh as the physician to House Atreides are also explored in the novels. In Hunters of Dune, set 5,000 years after Dune, Yueh is resurrected as a ghola to aid in the coming final battle with mankind's "great enemy." In Sandworms of Dune, the finale of the original series, the young Yueh ghola is wracked by feelings of intense guilt over the actions of the "original" Yueh. Though he does not yet possess those memories, he fears that he will repeat those mistakes. A ghola's memories are restored by subjecting the ghola to an intense personal trauma, specific to each individual, so Yueh's great fear of having his memories restored becomes the trigger used by the Bene Gesserit to unlock them. Later, Yueh kills the gestating ghola of Leto, having been tricked into believing that it was De Vries, and ultimately also kills the ghola of the Baron Harkonnen. Eleven years later, Yueh lives on the original Atreides homeworld Caladan, helping the Jessica ghola restore it to its former glory.

=== Mohiam ===
Bene Gesserit Reverend Mother Gaius Helen Mohiam is Padishah Emperor Shaddam IV's Truthsayer, and Lady Jessica's former teacher. In Dune, Mohiam subjects 15-year-old Paul Atreides to a life or death test of his humanity: he is inflicted with excruciating pain, but must exert control over his survival instinct and withstand it, or be killed instantly with a poisoned needle. Paul passes the test, having sustained more pain than anyone before him. Mohiam, though still furious at Jessica for disobeying the Sisterhood's command that she bear a daughter for their breeding scheme, is intrigued by the potential she sees in Paul and his nascent prescient abilities. Years later on Arrakis, Mohiam is shaken by her encounter with Paul's four-year-old sister Alia, who by misadventure had been born a fully aware Reverend Mother. Mohiam is further alarmed by the ritual battle-to-the-death between Paul and the Harkonnen heir, Feyd-Rautha, which could prove catastrophic for the Bene Gesserit breeding program no matter the outcome. Paul is victorious in the duel, and in seizing control of Arrakis, the only source of the all-important spice melange, gains insurmountable power over all civilization. Seeing the inevitability of the situation Paul has orchestrated, Mohiam compels Shaddam to give in to Paul's demands and relinquish the Imperial throne to him.

Twelve years later in Dune Messiah, Mohiam joins a conspiracy to topple the rule of Paul Atreides that includes the Tleilaxu Face Dancer Scytale, the Spacing Guild Navigator Edric, and even Paul's embittered consort Princess Irulan, Shaddam's daughter. Paul has sworn that only his Fremen concubine, Chani, will bear his children. Knowing that the Bene Gesserit are desperate to regain control of his bloodline for their breeding program, and are fearful of the effect Chani's "wild" genes may have on their offspring, Paul makes Mohiam an offer. In exchange for Chani's guaranteed safety, and the Sisterhood's acceptance of his decision to father no heirs with Irulan, Paul offers something of the utmost value: his sperm. This is a complicated proposition for Mohiam, because artificial insemination is forbidden in the wake of the anti-technology Butlerian Jihad, and the idea of it is as horrific to the Sisterhood as the loss of the precious Atreides genes. The conspiracy ultimately fails, and Paul kills Scytale. Edric and Mohiam are executed on orders from Paul's sister Alia, despite Paul's previous instructions to spare Mohiam's life.

Mohiam is portrayed by Siân Phillips in the 1984 film, and by Zuzana Geislerová in the 2000 miniseries and its 2003 sequel. The character is played by Charlotte Rampling in the 2021 film and its 2024 sequel.

=== Rabban ===
Glossu Rabban
- Dune character
- First appearance: Dune (1965)
- Last appearance: Dune: House Corrino (2001)
- Created by: Frank Herbert
- Portrayed by: Paul L. Smith (1984 film); László I. Kish (2000 series); Dave Bautista (2021 film / 2024 sequel)

In-universe information
- Family: House Harkonnen
- Relatives: Abulurd Harkonnen II (father); Emmi Rabban (mother); Feyd-Rautha (brother); Baron Vladimir Harkonnen (uncle)

Glossu "Beast" Rabban Harkonnen is the violent and brutish older nephew of Baron Harkonnen. He is as cruel and sadistic as his uncle, but lacks the Baron's intelligence. The Baron tasks Rabban to rule the planet Arrakis for a time in the most brutal way possible, so that when his favored nephew Feyd-Rautha takes over, Feyd will be welcomed as a hero by the populace.

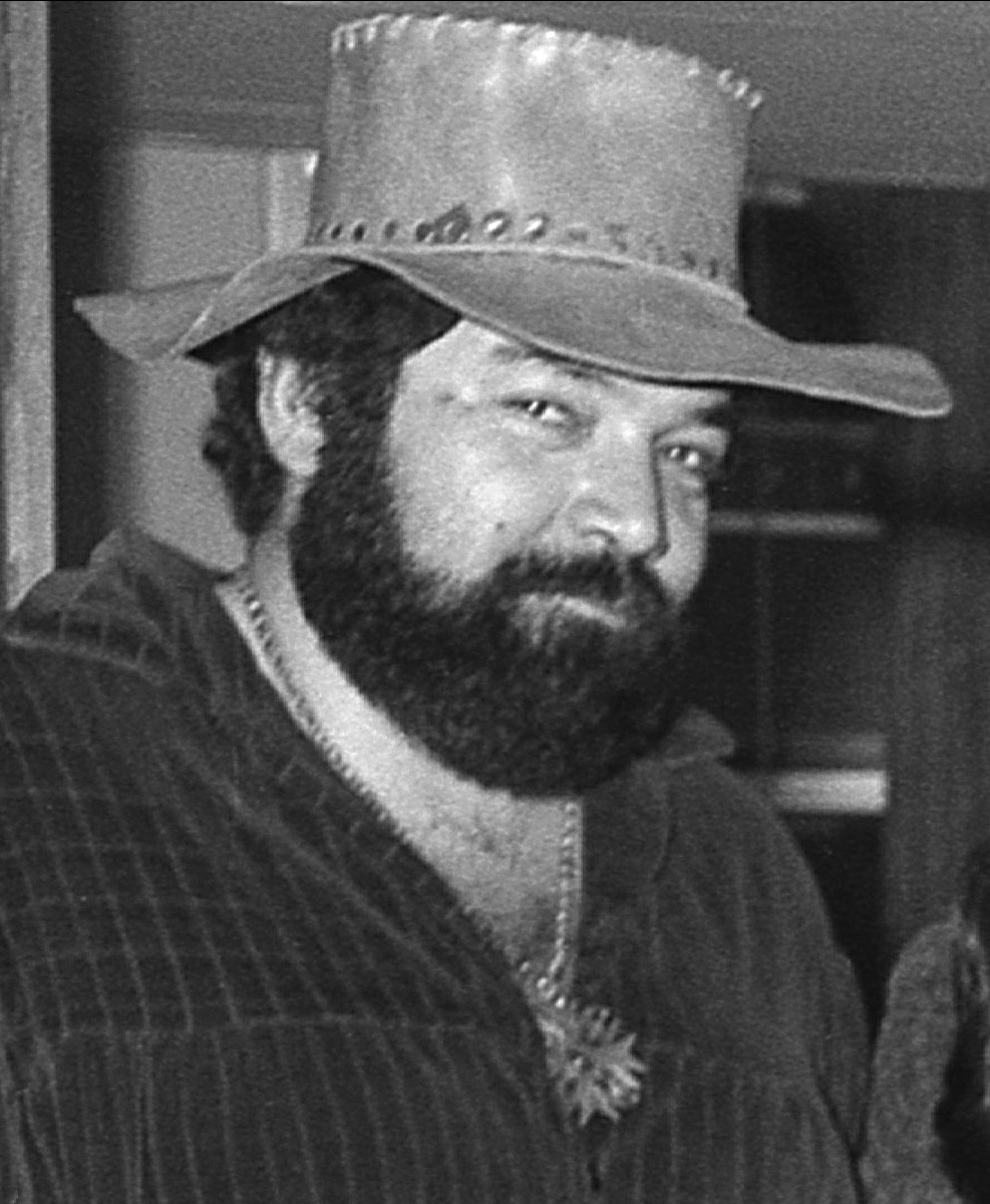
Paul L. Smith portrays Rabban in the 1984 film.

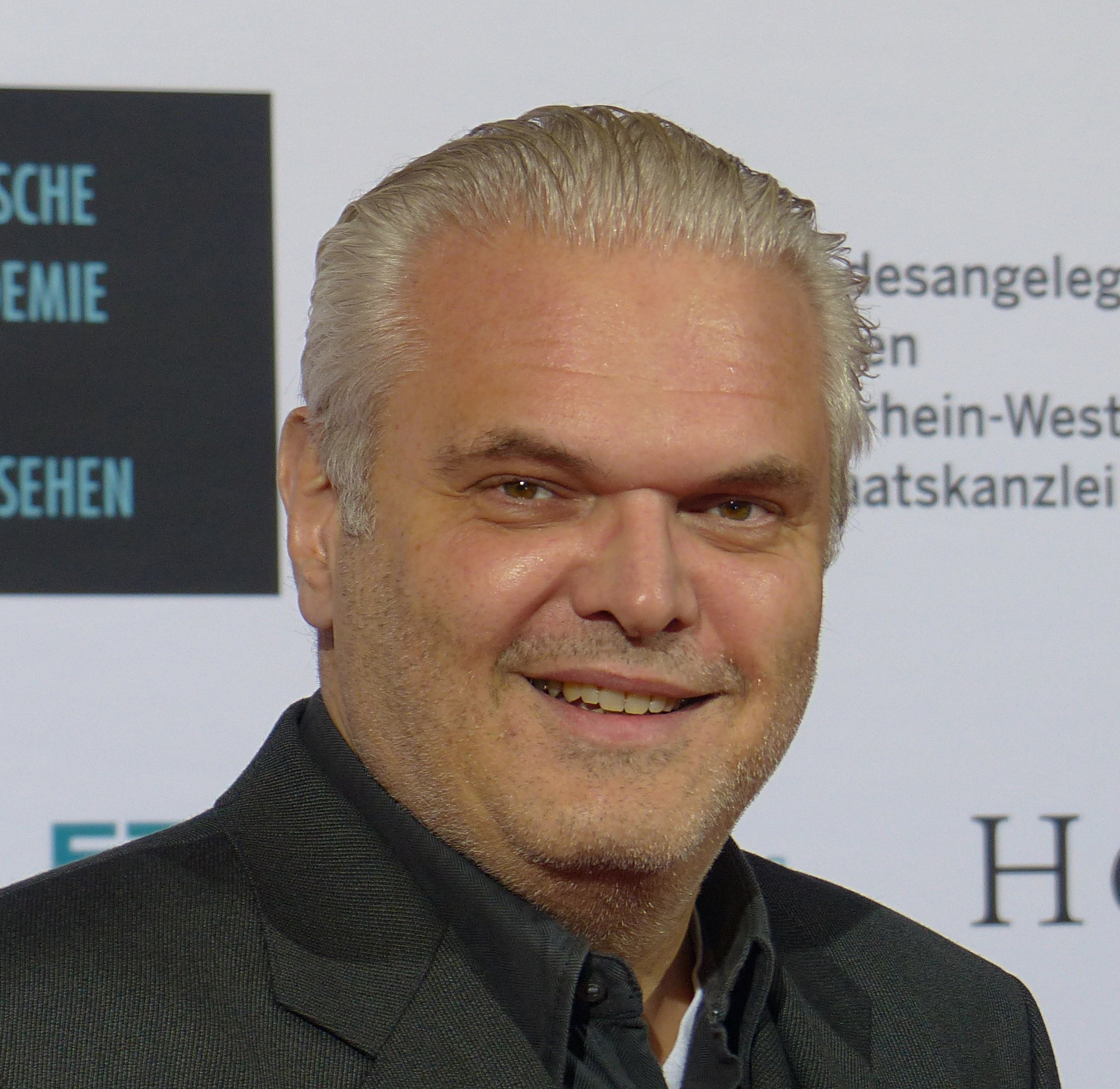
László I. Kish portrays Rabban in the 2000 miniseries.

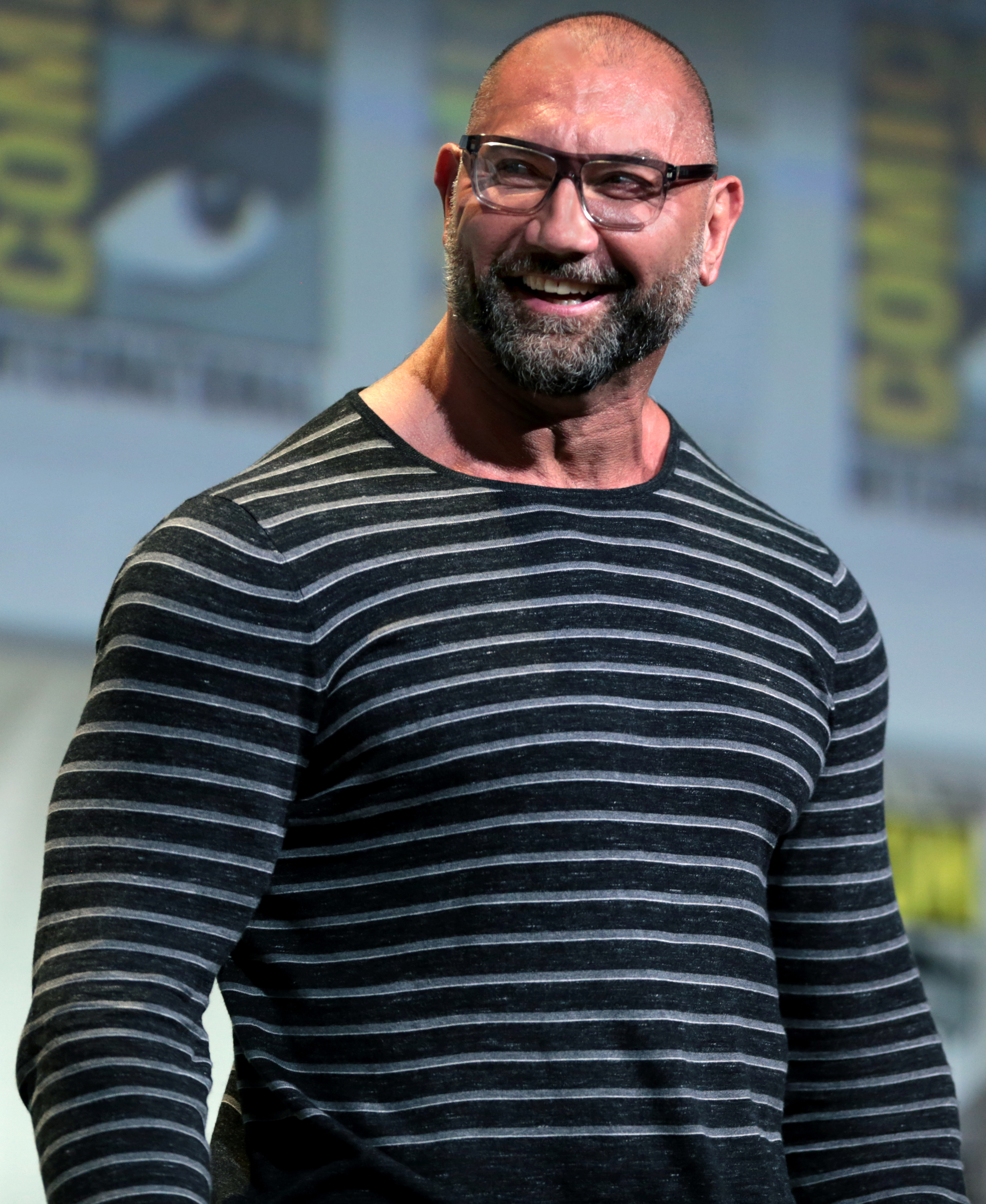
Dave Bautista portrays Rabban in the 2021 film and its 2024 sequel.

After the Baron seizes the planet back from Atreides control, Rabban tells his uncle that the Harkonnens have woefully underestimated both the numbers and threat of the Fremen population there. Known as "the Beast Rabban" on Arrakis for his aggression and cruelty, his Fremen nickname is "Mudir Nahya", which translates as "Demon Ruler" or "King Cobra". Rabban is killed by the Fremen and the people of Arrakeen when Paul "Muad'Dib" Atreides retakes Arrakis using Fremen forces.

Travis Johnson of Flicks.com.au describes Rabban as "the Baron's murderous and notably less Machiavellian nephew". Noting that the characters in Dune fit mythological archetypes, novelist Brian Herbert, Frank Herbert's son and biographer, writes that "Beast Rabban Harkonnen, though evil and aggressive, is essentially a fool."

Rabban is portrayed by Paul L. Smith in the 1984 film, and by László I. Kish in the 2000 Dune miniseries. The character is played by Dave Bautista in the 2021 film and its 2024 sequel.

Rabban also appears in the Prelude to Dune prequel trilogy by Brian Herbert and Kevin J. Anderson. In the series, he kills Duncan Idaho's parents and Gurney Halleck's sister, and earns his nickname "Beast" when he strangles his own father.

=== Feyd-Rautha ===
Feyd-Rautha Harkonnen is the charismatic yet deadly younger nephew and heir of Baron Harkonnen. In Dune, the Baron favors Feyd over his older brother Glossu Rabban because of Feyd's intelligence and his dedication to the Harkonnen culture of carefully planned and subtly executed sadism and cruelty, as opposed to Rabban's outright brutality. The Baron's succession plan is to install Feyd as ruler of Arrakis after a period of tyrannical misrule by Rabban, making Feyd appear to be the savior of the people. Like Paul Atreides, Feyd is also the product of a centuries-long breeding program organized by the Bene Gesserit, who planned to breed a Harkonnen son with an Atreides daughter with the expectation that their offspring would have a high probability of being their hoped-for super-being, the Kwisatz Haderach. For this reason, Lady Jessica's decision to defy the Sisterhood and to produce an Atreides son, Paul, threw the Bene Gesserit's plans into turmoil and established an irreconcilable tension between Feyd and Paul as the scions of their bitterly opposed noble houses. The risk of one or both of these young men being killed, destroying thousands of years of genetic engineering, is so great that the Bene Gesserit send an envoy, Margot Fenring, to seduce Feyd and conceive a child, salvaging his genetic material. Margot also uses an imprinting technique to condition Feyd to be vulnerable to Bene Gesserit control in the future. It is also later noted that Feyd's encounter with Lady Fenring produced a daughter. Feyd's ambition and impatience to inherit the Baron's title and power spur him to attempt his uncle's assassination. The attempt fails, prompting the Baron to reveal to his nephew the lofty plans he has for him, possibly to even have him ascend the throne as Emperor. The Baron explains that the elevation of House Harkonnen means more to him than power in his own lifetime, so if Feyd promises to forego any further assassination attempts, he will voluntarily step down and let his nephew succeed him—after his plot against the Emperor has succeeded. Feyd agrees, but as punishment for the failed assassination attempt, the Baron forces Feyd to single-handedly slaughter all the female slaves who serve as his lovers so that Feyd will learn the price of failure. As Paul seizes control of the all-important planet Arrakis and makes his final bid to usurp the Padishah Emperor's power, he is challenged by Feyd, the current Harkonnen leader after the deaths of the Baron and Rabban. Though famed for his prowess in single combat, Feyd intends to guarantee victory by breaking the formal rules of kanly (which govern this type of challenge) and using a hidden poison spur in his fighting outfit. He nearly succeeds in killing Paul in the ritualized fight, as Paul struggles with whether to try the paralysis word-sound given to him by his mother, and owe the Bene Gesserit his victory, or to risk his life against Feyd in a "fair" fight. Paul manages to defeat Feyd without the command, killing him, and goes on to accede to the Imperial throne.

Feyd is portrayed by Sting in the 1984 film, and by Matt Keeslar in the 2000 miniseries. The character does not appear in the 2021 film, but is played by Austin Butler in its 2024 sequel.

=== Princess Irulan ===
Princess Irulan is the eldest daughter of Padishah Emperor Shaddam IV and the Bene Gesserit Anirul. The character serves as a de facto narrator in Dune, with excerpts of Irulan's later writings used as epigraphs before each chapter of the novel. In forms such as diary entries, historical commentary, biography, quotations and philosophy, these writings set tone and provide exposition, context and other details intended to enhance understanding of Herbert's complex fictional universe and themes. In Dune, a widespread rebellion of the native Fremen on Arrakis creates a disruption in the production of the all-important spice melange, bringing Shaddam and his court, including Irulan, to the planet to impose order. Paul Atreides leads the Fremen in an overwhelming victory over the combined Harkonnen and Imperial Sardaukar forces and seizes control of Arrakis, the only known source of the spice. Paul demands that Shaddam relinquish the Imperial throne to him or he will destroy all spice production and plunge the universe into chaos. Shaddam bristles at Paul's suggestion that he marry Irulan, but she immediately recognizes the inevitability of the situation Paul has orchestrated, and tells Shaddam, "Here's a man fit to be your son." Once Paul defeats the treacherous Feyd-Rautha Harkonnen in single combat, and Count Fenring refuses the Emperor's order to kill Paul, Shaddam capitulates.

Twelve years later in Dune Messiah, Irulan is Paul's consort and trusted advisor, but he has sworn that only his beloved concubine Chani will bear his children. Paul and Chani remain childless, however, because a resentful Irulan, Bene Gesserit-trained and doing their bidding, has been secretly feeding Chani contraceptives to prevent her from conceiving an Imperial heir. The Sisterhood are desperate to regain control of Paul's bloodline for their breeding program, and are fearful of the effect Chani's "wild" genes may have on their offspring. But when Chani begins an ancient Fremen fertility diet high in melange, Irulan loses her ability to interfere, and Chani becomes pregnant. Chani ultimately discovers not only Irulan's role in her infertility but the fact that the contraceptives have caused permanent damage and will jeopardize her pregnancy. Chani seeks to kill Irulan, but Paul forbids it. He is secretly somewhat grateful to Irulan, as he has seen through his prescience that childbirth will bring Chani's death, and so Irulan has unwittingly extended Chani's life. Chani dies giving birth to the twins Leto II and Ghanima, and a newly blinded Paul follows Fremen custom and wanders alone into the desert to die. Realizing her love for Paul, Irulan breaks ties with the Bene Gesserit and dedicates herself to his children.

Nine years later in Children of Dune, Irulan's sister Wensicia plots to assassinate Leto and Ghanima to reclaim power for House Corrino through her son, Farad'n. Irulan also serves as chief advisor to Paul's sister Alia, who reigns as Holy Regent for the twins. Irulan attempts to serve as a guide and confidante to Ghanima, but is often flustered by the adult consciousness the twins possess as a result of being pre-born and having access to Other Memory. Ghanima cares for Irulan, but Alia never trusts the princess, due to Irulan's Corrino heritage and Alia's own increasing paranoia. Irulan flees into the desert with Ghanima and Stilgar during the Fremen rebellion against Alia's tyranny. Though the other rebels are massacred, Irulan and Stilgar are imprisoned upon their capture, and presumably freed when Leto deposes Alia.

Irulan is portrayed by Virginia Madsen in the 1984 film, and by Julie Cox in the 2000 miniseries and its 2003 sequel. The character does not appear in the 2021 film, but is played by Florence Pugh in its 2024 sequel.

=== Shaddam IV ===
Shaddam IV Corrino
- Dune character
- First appearance: Dune (1965)
- Created by: Frank Herbert
- Portrayed by: José Ferrer (1984 film); Giancarlo Giannini (2000 series); Christopher Walken (2024 film)

In-universe information
- Title: Padishah Emperor
- Family: House Corrino
- Spouse: Anirul
- Children: Irulan; Chalice; Wensicia; Josifa; Rugi
- Relatives: Elrood IX Corrino (father); Habla (mother); Farad'n (grandson); Fafnir Corrino (brother); Tyros Reffa (half brother)

Shaddam IV of House Corrino is the Padishah Emperor of the Known Universe, whose power is secured by his armies of fierce Sardaukar warriors and control of the desert planet Arrakis, the only source of the all-important spice melange. In Dune, Shaddam has granted Duke Leto Atreides control of the lucrative spice mining operations on Arrakis, previously managed by House Harkonnen, longtime enemies of the Atreides. Leto is aware that this assignment is some kind of trap, but is unable to refuse. Shaddam is threatened by Leto's growing influence among the Landsraad assembly of noble families, and uses the centuries-old feud between the Atreides and Harkonnens to disguise his moves against Leto. The forces of Baron Vladimir Harkonnen, secretly bolstered by Shaddam's Sardaukar and aided by a traitor in Leto's household, launch an attack that devastates the Atreides forces. Leto is killed, and his Bene Gesserit concubine Lady Jessica, and heir Paul, flee into the desert and are presumed dead in a sandstorm.

José Ferrer portrays Shaddam in the 1984 film.

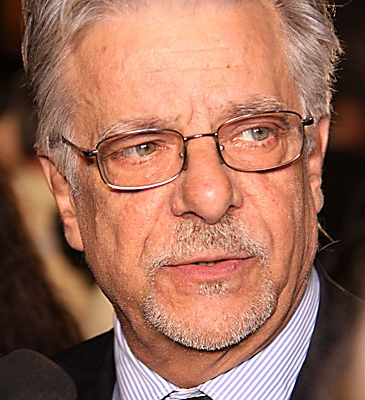
Giancarlo Giannini portrays Shaddam in the 2000 miniseries.

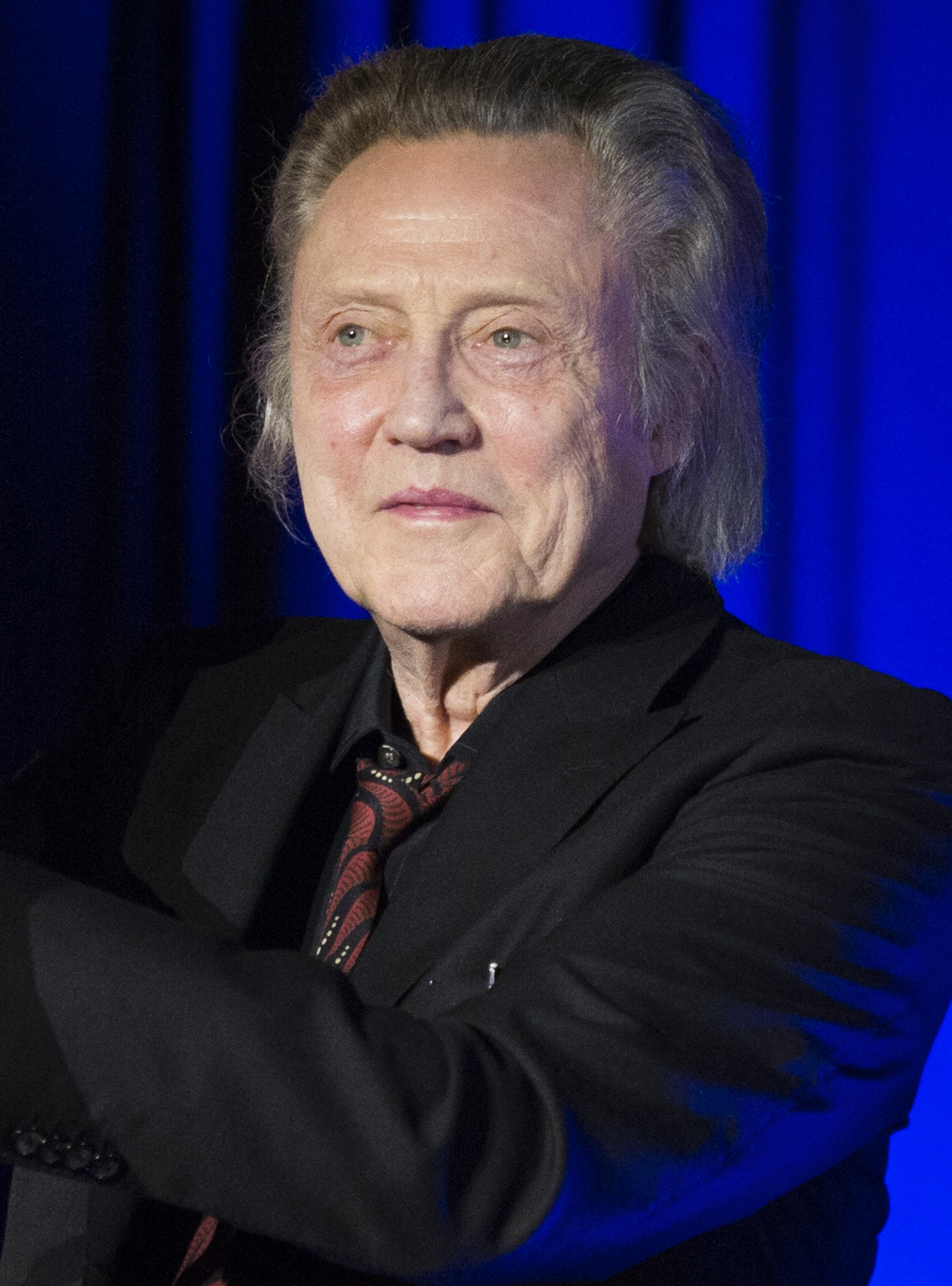
Christopher Walken portrays Shaddam in the 2024 film.

Years later, a rebellion of the native Fremen on Arrakis creates a disruption in the production of the all-important spice melange, bringing Shaddam and his court to the planet to impose order. Paul Atreides is alive, and has risen as a military and religious leader among the Fremen. He leads them in an overwhelming victory over the combined Harkonnen and Imperial forces and seizes control of Arrakis. Paul demands that Shaddam relinquish the Imperial throne to him or he will destroy all spice production and plunge the universe into chaos. Shaddam resists, but is forced to capitulate after Paul defeats Feyd-Rautha Harkonnen in single combat, and Count Fenring refuses Shaddam's order to kill Paul. Paul intends to take Shaddam's daughter, Princess Irulan, as his consort, and exile Shaddam.

Shaddam is described as "red-haired" by Irulan via epigraph in Dune, and noted to be 72 years old yet looking no older than 35. He is the son of Elrood IX and the 81st member of House Corrino to occupy the Golden Lion Throne. Shaddam has five daughters—the Princesses Irulan, Chalice, Wensicia, Josifa, and Rugi—and no legal sons by his wife Anirul, a Bene Gesserit of Hidden Rank. His closest friend is the assassin Count Fenring, a cousin and childhood companion.

Shaddam is portrayed by José Ferrer in the 1984 film, and by Giancarlo Giannini in the 2000 miniseries. Giannini also dubbed himself in the Italian version of the miniseries. The character does not appear in the 2021 film, but is played by Christopher Walken in its 2024 sequel.

Shaddam also appears in multiple prequel series by Brian Herbert and Kevin J. Anderson: Prelude to Dune, Heroes of Dune and The Caladan Trilogy. In the Prelude to Dune trilogy, Shaddam is eager to succeed his father Elrood IX as Padishah Emperor, but despite his advanced age Elrood shows no signs of ill health. Shaddam finally tasks his longtime friend and minion Fenring to administer Elrood with an undetectable, slow-acting poison. Shaddam had previously been complicit in the murder of his elder brother, the Crown Prince Fafnir, and had secretly administered contraceptives to his own mother, Habla, so she could not conceive another son to rival him. Elrood finally dies, and Shaddam secures his throne by paying the Spacing Guild with a supply of the spice and by arranging his own marriage to a Bene Gesserit. This union with the Lady Anirul Sadow-Tonkin results in five daughters, but no sons.

=== Gurney Halleck ===
Gurney Halleck is the Warmaster of Duke Leto Atreides, trained by "the best fighters in the universe", who has in turn trained Leto's son and heir Paul in hand-to-hand combat. Gurney, Duncan Idaho and the Mentat Thufir Hawat serve Leto as a war council unparalleled in the Imperium. Gurney is also a talented troubadour. In Dune, Gurney and 73 of his men survive the Harkonnen attack that devastates the Atreides forces, and they fall in with local spice smugglers to survive. Gurney and his team fall for a Fremen trap—a fake hoard of spice—and are almost killed before Paul, now the Fremen leader "Muad'Dib", recognizes him. Gurney nearly kills Jessica, mistakenly believing she betrayed Leto, but later becomes her loyal chief officer. In Children of Dune, Gurney returns to Arrakis with Jessica and coordinates a purging of dissidents with Fremen leader Stilgar. Gurney follows what he believes are Jessica's orders to test Paul's son Leto II to be sure he has not been overcome by his ancestral memories. Learning that the testing was actually ordered by Paul's sister Alia, Gurney escapes, sending a message to Duncan to initiate their plan to force Stilgar to join the rebellion against Alia. Gurney flees to a rebel sietch and joins Leto II and the mysterious Preacher, who is actually a blinded Paul. After Leto II returns to Arrakeen and reclaims the throne from Alia, Gurney is assigned to Sietch Tabr as part of Stilgar's council.

Gurney is portrayed by Patrick Stewart in the 1984 film, and by P. H. Moriarty in the 2000 miniseries and its 2003 sequel. The character is played by Josh Brolin in the 2021 film and its 2024 sequel.

=== Count Fenring ===
Count Hasimir Fenring is Padishah Emperor Shaddam IV's closest friend and advisor, and husband to the Bene Gesserit Lady Margot. Prior to the events of Dune, Fenring serves as the Imperial Spice Minister on Arrakis during the Harkonnen regime, and then as Governor of Arrakis during the handover period between House Harkonnen and House Atreides. In Dune, the Harkonnens, secretly aided by Shaddam's fierce Sardaukar warriors, destroy the Atreides forces and reclaim control of Arrakis. Fenring and Margot visit the Harkonnen homeworld of Giedi Prime, where the Count informs Baron Harkonnen that Shaddam is displeased with the way the invasion of Arrakis was handled, and is frustrated by The Baron's failure to suppress the disruptive native Fremen population. Fenring is also there on the Emperor's behalf to assess the Harkonnen heir, Feyd, which irks the Baron. Margot is also observing Feyd for the Bene Gesserit, who count him as an important part of their breeding program. Fenring is impressed with Feyd, but laments his upbringing among the brutal Harkonnens. Later, Paul Atreides leads the Fremen in an overwhelming victory over the combined Harkonnen and Imperial forces and seizes control of Arrakis. Paul demands that Shaddam relinquish the Imperial throne to him or he will destroy all spice production and plunge the universe into chaos. Shaddam resists, and Fenring, a deadly fighter and rumored assassin, is summoned and ordered to kill Paul. He refuses, aware that Paul represents the success of the Bene Gesserit breeding program of which Fenring himself is a failure. Paul deposes Shaddam, and the Fenrings join the former emperor in exile.

Fenring does not appear in the 1984 film, but is portrayed by Miroslav Táborský in the 2000 miniseries.

=== Margot Fenring ===
Margot, Lady Fenring, is the Bene Gesserit wife of Count Hasimir Fenring. Though the Count is the close friend and advisor of the Padishah Emperor Shaddam IV, Margot's primary loyalty is to the Sisterhood. In Dune, Duke Leto Atreides is lured to the desert planet Arrakis on the pretense of taking over the lucrative spice mining operation there, but the assignment is part of a plot by Shaddam and Baron Vladimir Harkonnen to destroy the Atreides. Margot leaves a coded message for Leto's Bene Gesserit concubine, Lady Jessica, warning her that the Atreides, especially Leto and Jessica's son Paul, are in imminent danger from the Harkonnens, and alerts her to the existence of a traitor in the Atreides household. Paul evades a trap set for him, but a devastating attack by the Harkonnens leaves Leto dead, and forces Paul and Jessica to flee into the desert. Due to the harsh conditions and an oncoming sandstorm, they are soon presumed dead. Margot is sent by the Bene Gesserit to seduce Feyd-Rautha Harkonnen and to "preserve the bloodline" by retrieving his genetic material, through conception, for their breeding program. She later bears Feyd's daughter. Margot also uses an imprinting technique to condition Feyd to be vulnerable to Bene Gesserit control in the future. Paul and Feyd later duel to the death, and Paul is victorious without using Margot's implanted command. Having seized control of the all-important Arrakis, Paul deposes Shaddam, and the Fenrings join the former emperor in exile.

Margot does not appear in the 1984 film, 2000 miniseries or 2021 film, but is portrayed by Léa Seydoux in the 2024 sequel film.

=== Thufir Hawat ===
Thufir Hawat
- Dune character
- First appearance: Dune (1965)
- Last appearance: Paul of Dune (2008)
- Created by: Frank Herbert
- Portrayed by: Freddie Jones (1984 film); Jan Vlasák (2000 miniseries); Stephen McKinley Henderson (2021 film)

In-universe information
- Occupation: Mentat; Master of Assassins
- Affiliation: House Atreides; House Harkonnen

Thufir Hawat is a Mentat, an individual conditioned to mimic the cognitive and analytical ability of computers, who serves as Master of Assassins and primary military strategist for Duke Leto Atreides. In Dune, the Atreides are lured to Arrakis on the pretense of taking over the lucrative spice mining operation there, but soon fall prey to a catastrophic attack by their longtime enemies the Harkonnens, whose forces are secretly bolstered by the fierce Sardaukar warriors of the emperor, Shaddam IV. Thufir is captured, and the calculating Baron Vladimir Harkonnen takes him as a replacement for his own twisted Mentat Piter De Vries, who was killed in the aftermath of the attack. The Baron hopes to channel Thufir's desire for revenge away from House Harkonnen, and keeps his abilities in check by feeding him false data, specifically, permitting him to believe that Leto's concubine Lady Jessica had been the traitor responsible for the Atreides' destruction. Thufir is also secretly administered a residual poison which requires regular doses of an antidote to prevent death.

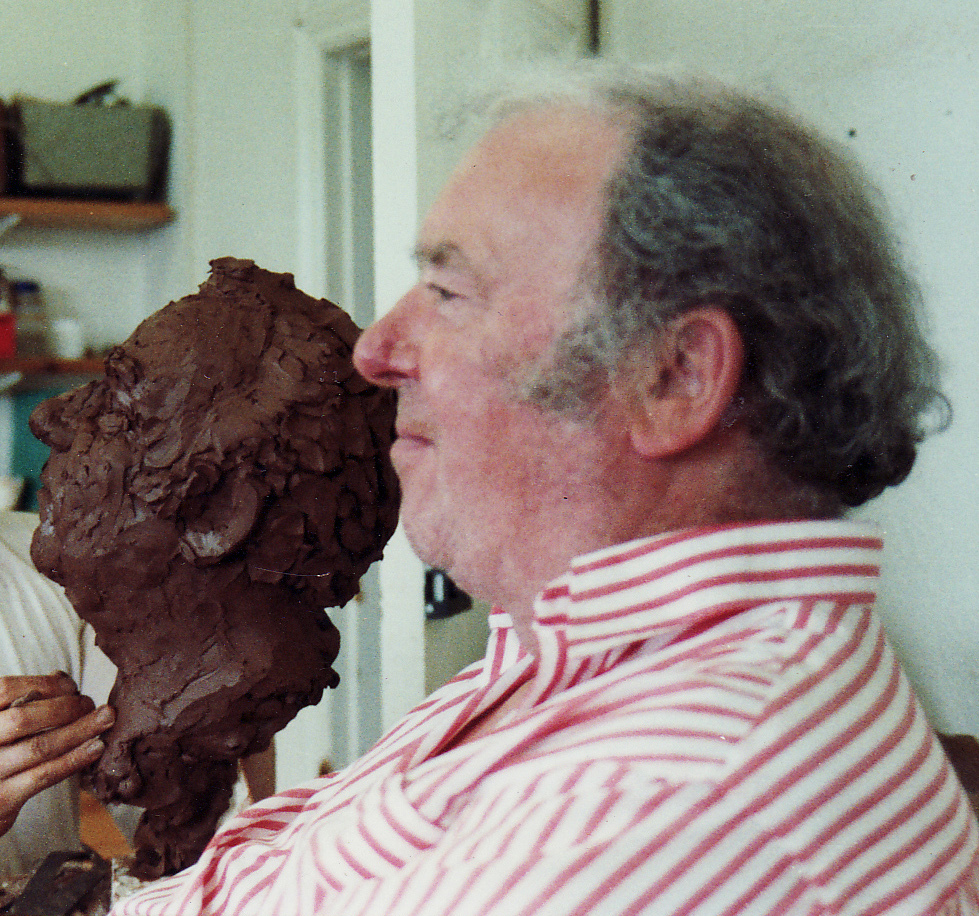
Freddie Jones portrays Thufir Hawat in the 1984 film.

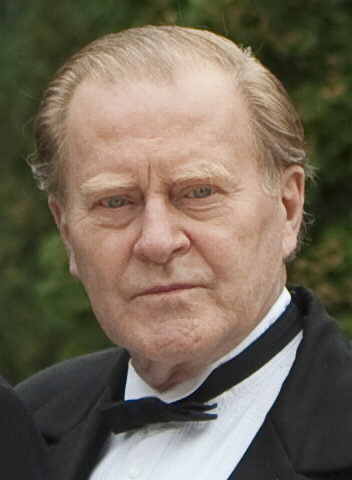
Jan Vlasák portrays Thufir Hawat in the 2000 miniseries.

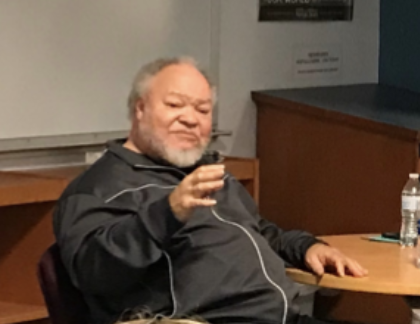
Stephen McKinley Henderson portrays Thufir Hawat in the 2021 film.

In spite of these obstacles, Thufir attempts to bring down the Harkonnens from within. He gains the trust of the Baron's nephew and heir Feyd-Rautha by assisting him with a plot to discredit the Harkonnen slavemaster and replace him with someone loyal to Feyd. Thufir encourages the ambitions of Feyd against the Baron, which leads him to attempt to assassinate his uncle. The Baron, warned by Thufir, eludes the attempt and punishes Feyd for his failure. Later, Thufir is coerced to assassinate Leto's son, Paul Atreides. Paul suspects this, but out of gratitude for Thufir's exceptional loyalty, Paul gives him the opportunity to take anything Thufir wishes of him, even his life. Hawat chooses death from the poison rather than to betray Paul.

Thufir is portrayed by Freddie Jones in the 1984 film, and by Jan Vlasák in the 2000 miniseries. The character is played by Stephen McKinley Henderson in the 2021 film and he filmed scenes for its 2024 sequel. However, his scenes were not included in the final cut.

The character also appears in the Prelude to Dune prequel trilogy by Brian Herbert and Kevin J. Anderson, and is resurrected as a ghola in Hunters of Dune and Sandworms of Dune, the Brian Herbert/Anderson sequels which conclude the original series.

=== Alia Atreides ===
Alia is the daughter of Duke Leto and Jessica, and is Paul's younger sister. Subjected to the Fremen spice agony in the womb, she is born a fully aware Reverend Mother. Among the Bene Gesserit, a child born in this manner, called an Abomination, is immediately killed because they are susceptible to being overtaken by their ancestral personas. Alia pretends to be a child as she grows up among the Fremen. At four years old, she kills her grandfather, the Baron Harkonnen, as Paul seizes control of Arrakis. As Paul's sister, Alia is worshipped in her own right in Dune Messiah. She and Hayt, who is the swordmaster Duncan Idaho brought back from the dead as a ghola by Tleilaxu means, work together to unravel the conspiracy against the Atreides. Alia is named regent for Paul and Chani's children, Leto II and Ghanima. In Children of Dune, Alia has married Hayt/Duncan but the danger of Abomination has come to fruition, and Alia is possessed by the persona of the Baron. Her increasing depravity and lust for power under his control drive her to plot Jessica's assassination. Confronted by Leto and overcome by the Baron, Alia has a fleeting moment of self-control and leaps to her death.

Alia is portrayed by Alicia Witt in the 1984 film, and by Laura Burton in the 2000 miniseries. Daniela Amavia portrays an adult Alia in the 2003 sequel miniseries. The character does not appear in the 2021 film, which covers the first part of Dune, but is portrayed by Anya Taylor-Joy in a cameo appearance in the 2024 sequel film.

=== Shadout Mapes ===
The Shadout Mapes is the mysterious Fremen housekeeper at the palace of Arakeen on Arrakis. In Dune, Duke Leto Atreides, his Bene Gesserit concubine Lady Jessica, and their son Paul arrive as Leto takes over management of the planet's lucrative spice mining operations. The Fremen begin to believe that Paul is their prophesied messiah, who is foretold to be accompanied by his Bene Gesserit mother, and when talking to Mapes, Jessica uses phrases that are part of the legend. Mapes gives Jessica a crysknife, a weapon made from the tooth of a giant sandworm that is considered holy by the Fremen and rarely seen by outsiders. Paul later saves Mapes from a deadly hunter-seeker intended to kill him, and she warns of a traitor in the Atreides household. Mapes is killed by that same traitor, Suk doctor Wellington Yueh, as the Harkonnens attack.

Mapes is portrayed by Linda Hunt in the 1984 film, and by Jaroslava Šiktancová in the 2000 miniseries. Golda Rosheuvel plays the character in the 2021 film.

Mapes is the main character of the 2022 short story "Dune: The Edge of a Crysknife" by Brian Herbert and Kevin J. Anderson, which takes place before the events of the Prelude to Dune trilogy.

=== Liet-Kynes ===
Liet-Kynes
- Dune character
- First appearance: Dune (1965)
- Created by: Frank Herbert
- Portrayed by: Max von Sydow (1984 film); Karel Dobrý (2000 series); Sharon Duncan-Brewster (2021 film)

In-universe information
- Occupation: Planetary ecologist
- Affiliation: Fremen
- Spouse: Faroula
- Children: Chani
- Relatives: Pardot Kynes (father); Frieth (mother); Leto II Atreides (grandson); Ghanima Atreides (granddaughter)

Liet-Kynes is the Imperial Planetologist of the desert planet Arrakis, and the father of Chani by his Fremen wife, Faroula. In Dune, Duke Leto Atreides meets with Kynes soon after arriving on Arrakis to take over the melange harvesting operations there. Escorted by the planet's native Fremen, Kynes is the liaison between them and the Imperials. Kynes takes personal note of Leto's son Paul, who seems to know Fremen ways intuitively, and shows signs of being a prophesied Fremen messiah. The Atreides later hear of a person or deity named "Liet" to whom all the Fremen communities give allegiance.

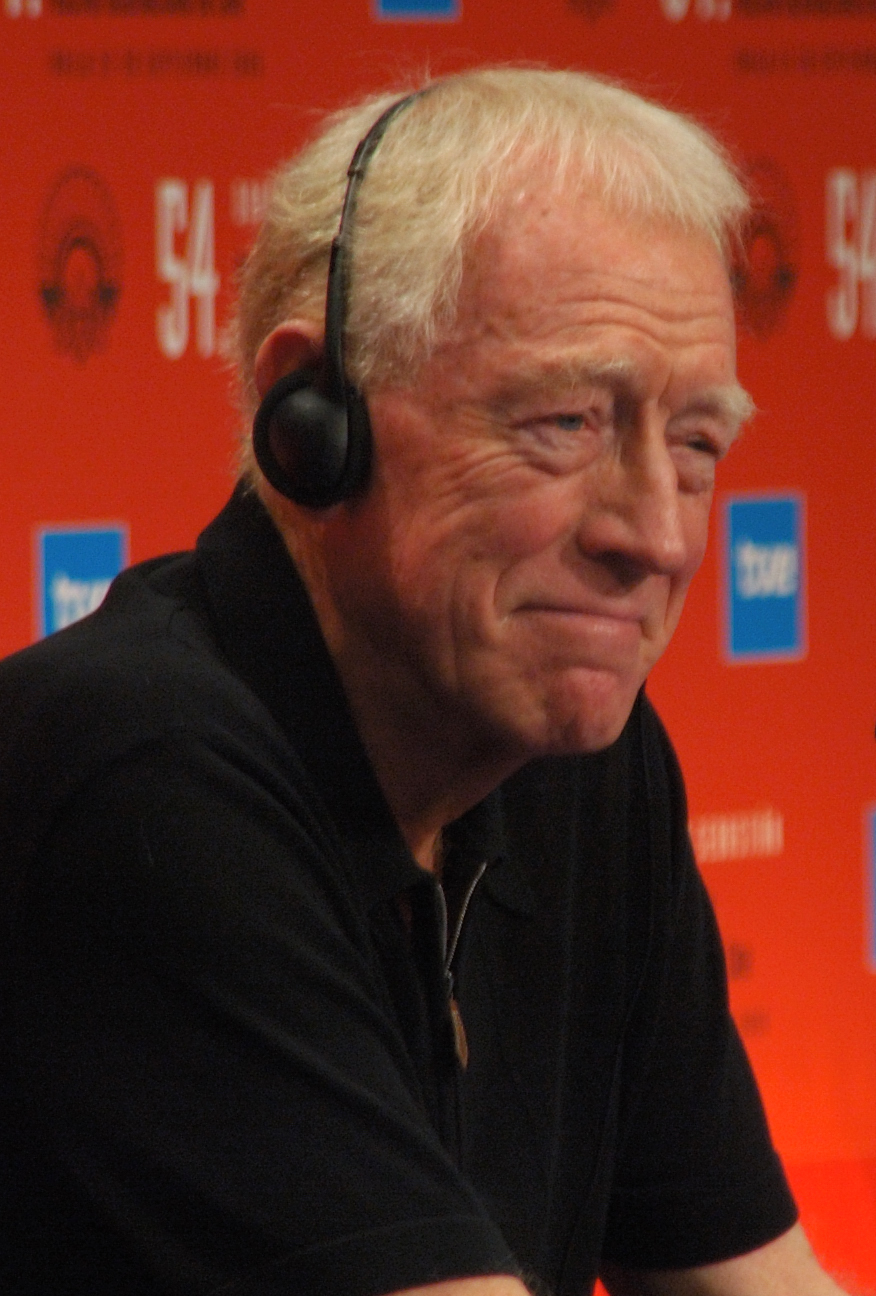
Max von Sydow portrays Liet-Kynes in the 1984 film.

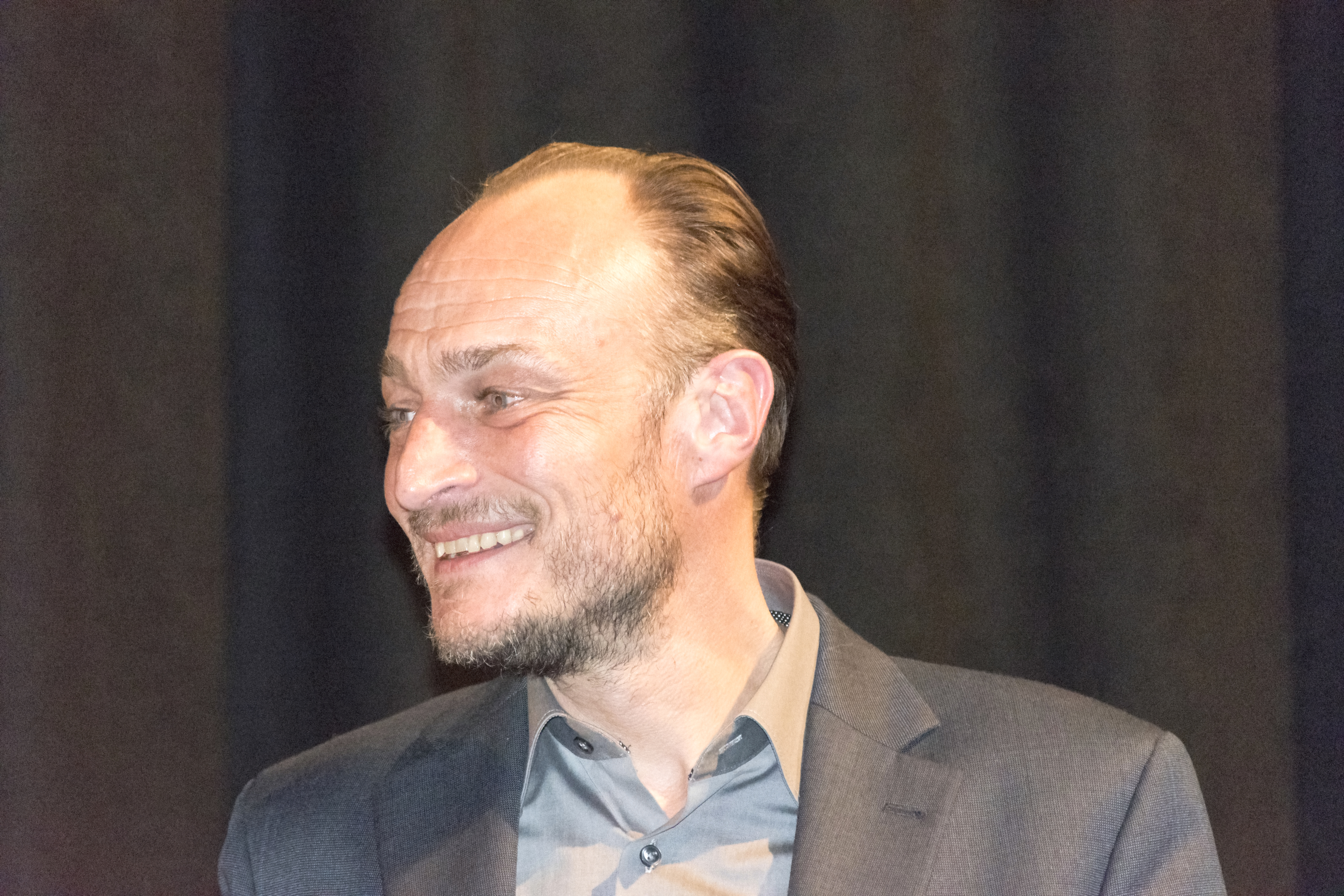
Karel Dobrý portrays Liet-Kynes in the 2000 miniseries.

It is only after Leto is killed, and Paul and his mother, Lady Jessica, take refuge among the Fremen that Liet and Kynes are revealed to be the same person. He is the son of Pardot Kynes, the first Imperial Planetologist of Arrakis, and a Fremen woman, and is Chani's father. Captured by the Harkonnens and left to die in the desert without a stillsuit or water, Kynes is killed by a spice blow, an explosive eruption that is part of the melange cycle. In God Emperor of Dune, Liet-Kynes's wife and Chani's mother is identified as Faroula, "a noted herbalist among the Fremen".

Liet-Kynes is portrayed by Max von Sydow in the 1984 film, and by Karel Dobrý in the 2000 miniseries. Sharon Duncan-Brewster plays a gender-swapped version of the character in the 2021 film.

In February 2024, a Lego Dune playset based on the Atreides ornithopter from the 2021 Dune film was released, containing a Liet-Kynes Lego minifigure based on Duncan-Brewster's portrayal in the 2021 film.

Liet-Kynes also appears in the Prelude to Dune prequel trilogy by Brian Herbert and Kevin J. Anderson. That series establishes that his mother is Frieth, the sister of Stilgar. Growing up under Fremen tradition, Liet inherits his father's position as planetologist as well as his secret goal of terraforming Arrakis into a temperate planet.

=== Ramallo ===
Reverend Mother Ramallo is a spiritual leader, or Sayyadina, among the Fremen of Sietch Tabr on Arrakis, a "wild" version of a Bene Gesserit Reverend Mother. In Dune, Paul Atreides and his Bene Gesserit mother, Lady Jessica, flee a Harkonnen attack and find refuge among the Fremen. When Ramallo knows she is nearing the end of her life, Jessica undergoes the ritual spice agony to make her Ramallo's replacement. The Fremen ordeal to become a Reverend Mother involves ingesting the poisonous Water of Life, the exhalation of a dying sandworm. Jessica survives and shares minds with Ramallo, acquiring the older woman's life experiences and collective ancestral Other Memory, and then Ramallo dies.

Ramallo is portrayed by Italian actress Silvana Mangano in the 1984 film. Drahomíra Fialková plays the character in the 2000 miniseries, with Petra Kulíková as a younger version of Ramallo. Giusi Merli portrays the dying Fremen Reverend mother in the 2024 film Dune: Part Two.

Ramallo also appears in the Prelude to Dune prequel trilogy by Brian Herbert and Kevin J. Anderson.

=== Jamis ===
Jamis is a formidable Fremen warrior from Sietch Tabr. In Dune, Paul Atriedes and his Bene Gesserit mother, Lady Jessica, flee a Harkonnen attack and find refuge with the Fremen of Sietch Tabr. Newcomer Paul is immediately challenged by the distrustful Fremen warrior Jamis, and per Fremen custom they engage in a ritual fight to the death. Paul kills Jamis, and is subsequently obliged to take responsibility for his wife Harah and children.

Jamis is portrayed by Judd Omen in the 1984 film, Christopher Lee Brown in the 2000 miniseries, and by Babs Olusanmokun in the 2021 film.

=== Harah ===
Harah is the Fremen wife of Jamis. Her first husband was Geoff, by whom she had a son, Kaleff. Jamis defeated Geoff in a ritual duel and took Harah as his own wife, and fathered her son Orlop. After Paul kills Jamis in a ritual fight to the death in Dune, Fremen custom demands that Paul inherit his possessions, including Harah and her children. Paul must take her into his household as his wife or his servant, and after a year if he has not married her, she may choose as she wishes. Paul accepts Harah as a servant. She is at first insulted by his reluctance to marry her, but dedicates herself to his service. Harah becomes very close to, and protective of, Paul's young sister Alia, who is born a fully aware Reverend Mother and pretends to be a child as she grows up among the Fremen. In Dune Messiah, Harah is married to Stilgar, and is Chani's closest friend. She is witness to the birth of Paul and Chani's twins, Leto II and Ghanima, and to Chani's subsequent death. In Children of Dune Harah dedicates herself to the care of the twins. When an adult Alia's tyranny becomes too great and endangers Leto and Ghanima, Harah goes into hiding with Stilgar, Princess Irulan and the children.

Harah is portrayed by Molly Wrynn in the 1984 film.

=== Piter De Vries ===
Piter De Vries
- Dune character
- First appearance: Dune (1965)
- Created by: Frank Herbert
- Portrayed by: Brad Dourif (1984 film); Jan Unger (2000 series); David Dastmalchian (2021 film)

In-universe information
- Occupation: Twisted Mentat
- Affiliation: House Harkonnen

Piter De Vries is a Mentat, an individual conditioned to mimic the cognitive and analytical ability of computers, who serves the ruthless Baron Vladimir Harkonnen. Piter has the added distinction of having been "twisted" into an amoral sadist by the Tleilaxu.

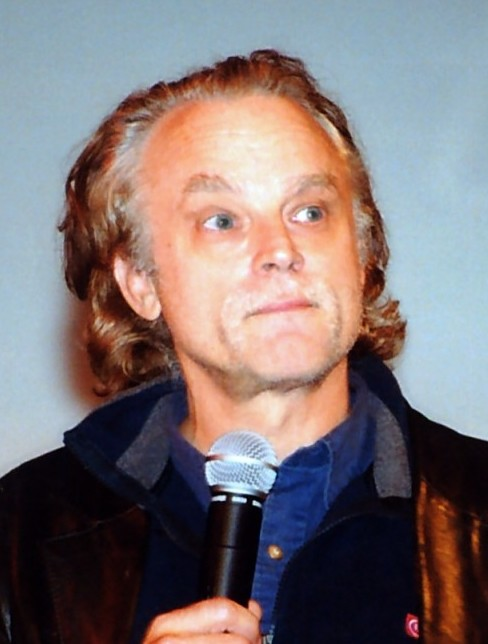
Brad Dourif portrays Piter De Vries in the 1984 film.

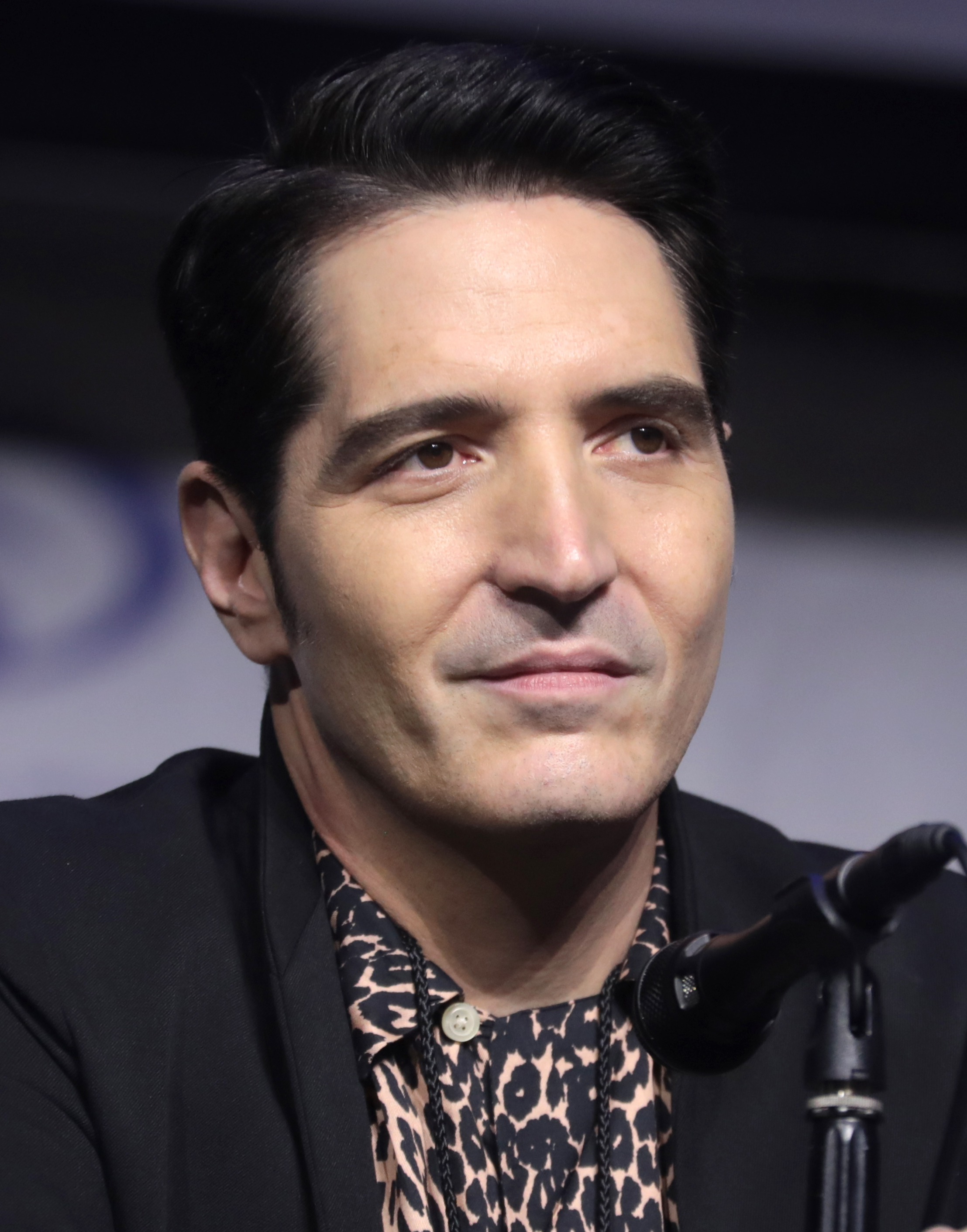
David Dastmalchian portrays Piter De Vries in the 2021 film.

In Dune, Piter is the architect of the plan to destroy House Atreides, longtime enemy of the Harkonnens, while restoring the Baron's stewardship over the planet Arrakis. Though the personal physician of Duke Leto Atreides, Wellington Yueh, has undergone Suk conditioning which renders him incapable of inflicting harm on his patients, Piter subverts it by kidnapping and torturing Yueh's wife. Hoping to free her, Yueh betrays the Atreides, enabling a catastrophic attack by the Harkonnens and delivering Leto to the Baron. Yueh learns that his wife is already dead and is killed by Piter. Yueh, however, has given the captive Leto a false tooth filled with poison gas with which to assassinate the Baron. The Baron evades the assassination but Leto and Piter die. Piter is the creator of residual poison, a toxin which requires regular doses of an antidote to prevent death. The Baron secretly administers it to the captured Atreides Mentat Thufir Hawat as coercion to make him the replacement for Piter.

In the novel, Piter is described as "tall, though slender, and something about him suggested effeminacy". He is addicted to the drug melange possessing the blue eyes of Ibad that comes with prolonged spice consumption, in addition to the ruby red lips characteristic of those who consume sapho juice, an addictive drug which enhances Mentat capabilities.

Piter is portrayed by Brad Dourif in the 1984 film, and by Jan Unger in the 2000 miniseries. David Dastmalchian plays the character in the 2021 film.

Piter also appears in the Prelude to Dune prequel trilogy by Brian Herbert and Kevin J. Anderson. In the series, Piter discovers the Harkonnen heritage of Lady Jessica and her newborn son Paul, and attempts to kidnap and ransom the infant. The plot is thwarted and the secret preserved when Bene Gesserit Reverend Mother Mohiam kills the Mentat and arranges for his corpse to be shipped home to the Harkonnen homeworld, Giedi Prime. An enraged Baron Harkonnen is left with no choice but to order a duplicate from the Bene Tleilax: the Mentat Piter featured in Herbert's original novel Dune.

=== Other ===
- Otheym is one of Paul's loyal Fedaykin death commandos in Dune. In Dune Messiah, he is ill after fighting in Paul's jihad, but reveals to Paul evidence of a Fremen conspiracy against him. Otheym gives Paul his dwarf Tleilaxu servant Bijaz, who, like a recording machine, can remember faces, names, and details. Paul accepts reluctantly, seeing the strands of a Tleilaxu plot. Otheym's daughter Lichna is also killed and replaced by a Tleilaxu Face Dancer as a means to infiltrate Paul's household. Otheym is portrayed by Honorato Magalone in the 1984 film, and by Jakob Schwarz in the 2000 miniseries and its 2003 sequel.
- Korba is one of Paul's loyal Fedaykin death commandos in Dune. In Dune Messiah, he has become a fanatic of the religion which has risen around Paul, and the High Priest among its Qizarate leaders. Hoping to increase his own religious power, Korba joins a conspiracy to set off an atomic weapon called a stone burner to martyr Paul. The explosion kills hundreds of Fremen and blinds many other, including Paul himself. Korba is tried for his crimes, and executed by Stilgar. Korba is portrayed by Karel Dobrý in the 2003 miniseries.
- Esmar Tuek is a spice smuggler on Arrakis. In Dune, he attends a dinner thrown by Duke Leto Atreides and his Bene Gesserit concubine Lady Jessica at their Arrakeen palace. Esmar is later killed in the Harkonnen attack on Arrakeen that effectively destroys House Atreides. Esmar is portrayed by Pavel Kríz in the 2000 miniseries.
- Staban Tuek is a spice smuggler on Arrakis like his father, Esmar Tuek. After the Harkonnen attack on Arrakeen, Staban gives sanctuary to Atreides Warmaster Gurney Halleck and his surviving troops. Gurney and his men join the smugglers, improving their organization and efficiency.
- Captain Aramsham is the commander of the Imperial Sardaukar forces who arrive on Arrakis with Padishah Emperor Shaddam IV to impose order when Fremen attacks disrupt spice production on the planet. The ferocious Sardaukar soldier-fanatics are considered unstoppable, but the Fremen overcome them thanks to Paul's military strategy, their own ferocity and their ability to use sandstorms and the giant sandworms of Arrakis to their advantage. Paul uses the Bene Gesserit compulsion technique called the Voice to compel Aramsham to humiliate himself by surrendering. However, Aramsham's Sardaukar stoicism is so great that he will not even give his name until Paul uses the Voice again. The defeat of the Sardaukar allows Paul to seize control of Arrakis and depose Shaddam.
- Iakin Nefud is the Captain of the Guard for House Harkonnen, promoted from a corporal after the death of his predecessor Umman Kudu in Duke Leto Atreides' poison gas attack on Baron Vladimir Harkonnen. Nefud is addicted to the drug semuta. Nefud is portrayed by Jack Nance in the 1984 film.
- Wanna Marcus is the Bene Gesserit wife of Suk doctor Wellington Yueh, the personal physician of Duke Leto Atreides. Prior to the events transpiring in Dune, she is kidnapped by Baron Vladimir Harkonnen, who uses the threat of her extended torture to subvert Yueh's Suk Imperial Conditioning, which normally prohibits him from doing harm, and coerce him to betray Leto. Yueh submits to the Baron's demands, lowering the Atreides defensive shields and delivering Leto to him, but also gives Leto the means to assassinate the Baron. Yueh discovers, as he suspected, that Wanna has already been killed, and is himself murdered by the Baron's twisted Mentat, Piter De Vries. However, Yueh's loyalty to the Atreides had prompted him to aid Leto's son Paul and concubine Lady Jessica escape from the Harkonnens.

== Introduced in Dune Messiah (1969) ==
=== Scytale ===
Scytale
- Dune character
- First appearance: Dune Messiah (1969)
- Created by: Frank Herbert
- Portrayed by: Leonardo Cimino (1984 film; as "The Baron's Doctor"); Martin McDougall (2003 miniseries); Robert Pattinson (2026 film)

In-universe information
- Gender: Hermaphrodite
- Occupation: Face Dancer
- Affiliation: Bene Tleilax

Scytale is a Tleilaxu Face Dancer who executes a plot to dethrone Paul Atreides in Dune Messiah. His conspiracy includes Spacing Guild Navigator Edric, the Bene Gesserit Reverend Mother Mohiam, and the Princess Irulan, Paul's consort. In comparison to them, however, Scytale understands Paul's plight and fears the threat of a fully uncontrolled Jihad, leading him to call to remove Paul in a calculated way. Unlike Face Dancers depicted later in the series, Scytale's information and high-level dealings suggest a certain rank and level of trust among the Tleilaxu.

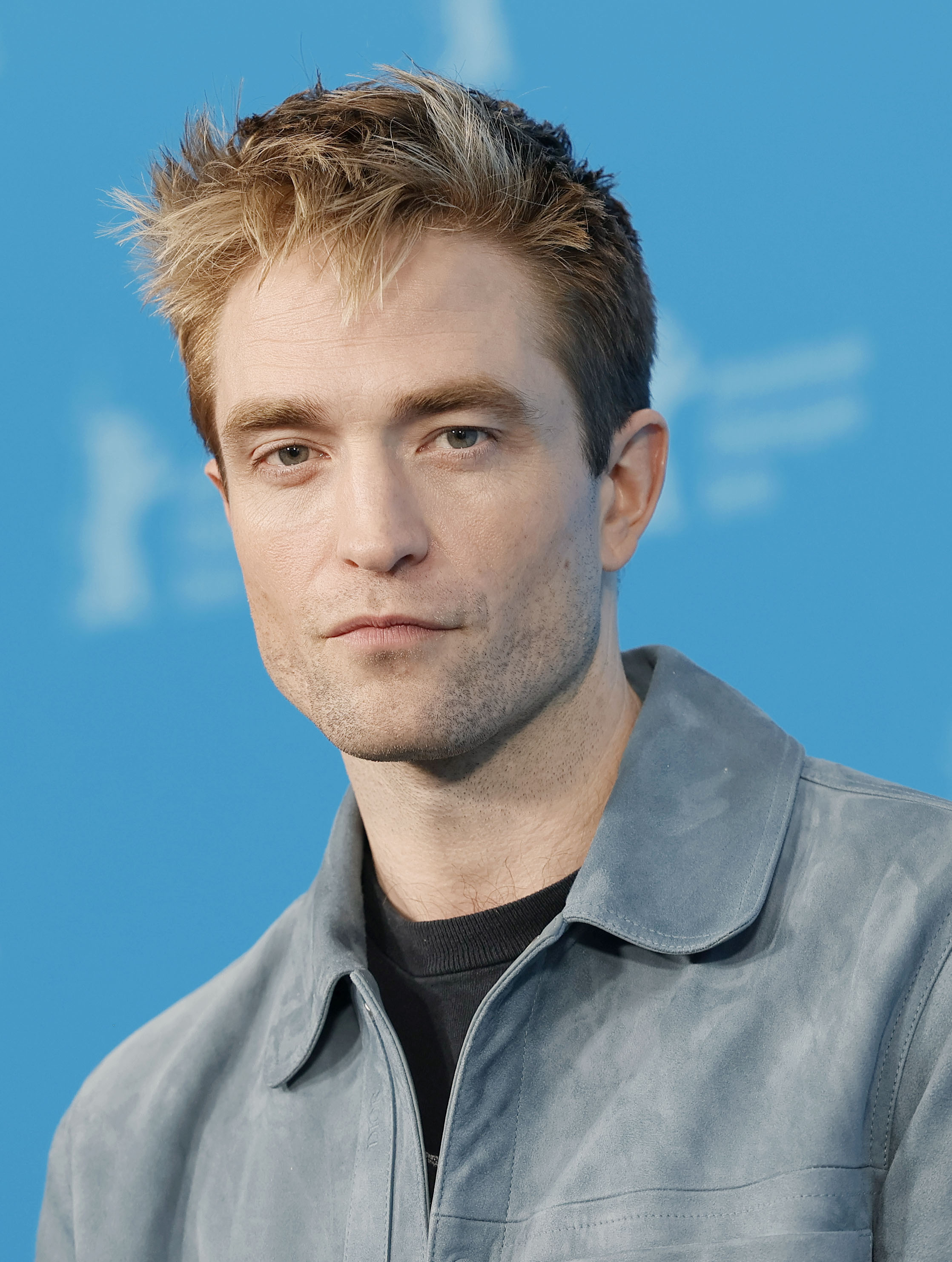
Robert Pattinson will portray Scytale in the 2026 film Dune: Part Three.

Scytale notes of Face Dancers, "We are Jadacha hermaphrodites ... either sex at will." He subsequently kills and assumes the appearance of Lichna, the daughter of the trusted Fremen commando Otheym, in order to lure Paul from the Atreides Keep to Otheym's house, where Scytale has planted an atomic weapon. The attack fails to kill Paul, but the atomic blast blinds him. Scytale soon makes an attempt to force Paul's allegiance. With the Tleilaxu ghola of Duncan Idaho having regained the memories of the deceased original, Scytale has proven that the Tleilaxu can resurrect a human being. He offers Paul a ghola of his concubine Chani, who has just died giving birth to their twin children, in exchange for Paul surrendering his empire to Tleilaxu control. Though tempted, Paul refuses. Scytale holds a knife over the newborn twins, threatening to kill them instantly unless Paul accepts. Paul instead kills Scytale with a thrown crysknife, guided by a vision sent by his infant son.

In Heretics of Dune, 5000 years after the events of Dune Messiah, a ghola of Scytale is a Tleilaxu Master and one of Tleilaxu leader Tylwyth Waff's nine councillors. The novel establishes that after learning how to restore a ghola's memories in Dune Messiah, the Masters use this knowledge as a form of immortality, creating clones from their living cells which can be reawakened upon their deaths. Face Dancers are still Tleilaxu servants rather than emissaries, and Herbert does not explain how the Scytale of Dune Messiah—a Face Dancer, though autonomous—could ascend to become a Master, or how the Master/Face Dancer relationship may have evolved over the millennia.

In Chapterhouse Dune (1985), the fearsome Honored Matres have destroyed all of the Tleilaxu worlds in retaliation for the Tleilaxu role in programming the latest Duncan Idaho ghola with knowledge of how to sexually enslave Honored Matres. Scytale, likely the last surviving Tleilaxu Master, barely escapes the attack while leaving his homeworld and is given sanctuary by the Bene Gesserit. Essentially a prisoner, he is kept in a no-ship grounded on the secret Bene Gesserit planet Chapterhouse. In exchange for their protection, Scytale has given the Bene Gesserit the knowledge to create axlotl tanks to grow their own gholas. Desiring his own Face Dancer servants, axlotl tanks, and access to the ship's systems, Scytale has held back the secret to creating artificial melange for future negotiations. His secret bargaining chip is a nullentropy capsule containing cells carefully and covertly collected by the Tleilaxu for millennia, including those of Tleilaxu Masters and Face Dancers, Paul, Chani, the original Duncan Idaho, Thufir Hawat, Gurney Halleck and Stilgar.

The character "The Baron's Doctor" in the 1984 film Dune, portrayed by Leonardo Cimino, was intended to be revealed as Scytale in Dune II, a planned sequel film adapting Dune Messiah which was never made. Posing as Baron Harkonnen's physician, Scytale would have absconded with Duncan Idaho's corpse and spent years reviving it. Scytale is portrayed by Martin McDougall in the 2003 miniseries Frank Herbert's Children of Dune, which is an adaptation of both Dune Messiah and its sequel Children of Dune. Robert Pattinson will portray Scytale in Denis Villeneuve's 2026 film Dune: Part Three.

Scytale also appears in the sequel novels Hunters of Dune and Sandworms of Dune by Brian Herbert and Kevin J. Anderson. In Hunters of Dune, Scytale is desperate, as his current body is slowly dying, and he does not have another to replace it. Needing to grow a new ghola clone of himself, his only bargaining tool is the secret nullentropy capsule. Other cells in Scytale's possession include those of Leto I, Lady Jessica, Leto II and other legendary figures dating back to Serena Butler and Xavier Harkonnen from the Butlerian Jihad. The Bene Gesserit debate whether to create gholas of any of these historical figures, and despite the controversy, gholas are created a few at a time. Scytale is allowed to have his own once the first few have been born. In Sandworms of Dune, Scytale finally reawakens his own ghola's memories using the trauma of watching the elder Scytale die in front of his younger self. Along with gholas of the Tleilaxu Masters, Scytale grows Tleilaxu females from newly discovered cells, vowing to never again allow the Masters to corrupt the recovering Tleilaxu people.

=== Edric ===
Edric
- Dune character
- First appearance: Dune Messiah (1969)
- Created by: Frank Herbert
- Portrayed by: Terrence Stone (2003 miniseries)

In-universe information
- Occupation: Guild Navigator
- Affiliation: Spacing Guild

Edric is a Spacing Guild Navigator and the Guild's ambassador on Arrakis. In Dune Messiah, Edric engages in a conspiracy to dethrone Emperor Paul Atreides, joined by the Tleilaxu Face Dancer Scytale, the Bene Gesserit Reverend Mother Mohiam, and Paul's embittered consort, Princess Irulan. As its Navigators require immense quantities of melange to navigate foldspace, the Spacing Guild has a vested interest in breaking Paul's stranglehold over the spice supply. Edric's involvement also protects the conspirators from discovery, as his prescience hides the activities of himself and those around him from other prescients, like Paul. The plot ultimately fails, and Edric and Mohiam are executed by Fremen naib Stilgar on orders from Paul's sister, Alia Atreides.

In Chapterhouse Dune, a "very powerful" Navigator is described as "one of the Edrics", suggesting a possible breeding plan or use of gholas.

=== Bijaz ===
Bijaz is a prescient Tleilaxu dwarf in the employ of Otheym, one of the former Fedaykin death commandos of Paul Atreides. In Dune Messiah, Otheym reveals to Paul evidence of a Fremen conspiracy against him. Otheym gives Paul his dwarf Tleilaxu servant Bijaz, who has the ability to remember faces, names and details like a recording machine. Paul accepts reluctantly, seeing the strands of a Tleilaxu plot, as he was unable to predict Bijaz due to the dwarf's own prescience. Bijaz, actually an agent of the Tleilaxu Face Dancer Scytale, uses a specific humming intonation to implant a command that will compel the Duncan Idaho ghola, Hayt, to kill Paul under certain circumstances. Paul's concubine Chani dies in childbirth, and Paul's reaction to her death triggers Hayt's assassination attempt. Hayt's ghola body reacts against its own programming and Duncan's full consciousness is recovered, simultaneously making him independent of Tleilaxu control. Having proven that a ghola's memories of its originator can be restored, Scytale offers Paul a ghola of Chani in exchange for Paul surrendering his empire to Tleilaxu control. Paul refuses, and Scytale is killed. Later, Bijaz approaches Paul and repeats Scytale's offer, but is killed by Duncan on Paul's order.

Bijaz is portrayed by Gee Williams in the 2003 miniseries.

=== Lichna ===
Lichna is the daughter of Otheym, one of Paul's former Fedaykin death commandos. In Dune Messiah, she is killed and impersonated by the shapeshifting Tleilaxu Face Dancer Scytale as a means to infiltrate Paul's household. Paul can see through the deception, but wants to see where the plot leads. Aware it is part of the conspiracy against him, Paul allows himself to be lured to Otheym's home in the city.

Lichna is portrayed by Klára Issová in the 2003 miniseries.

=== Farok ===
Farok is another of Paul's former Fedaykin. In Dune Messiah, he is one of many Fremen disillusioned by the changes Paul's regime brings to their culture, and joins the conspiracy to unseat Paul.

Farok is portrayed by Ivo Novák in the 2003 miniseries, and will be portrayed by Isaach de Bankolé in Denis Villeneuve's 2026 film Dune: Part Three.

== Introduced in Children of Dune (1976) ==
=== Princess Wensicia ===
Princess Wensicia
- Dune character
- Susan Sarandon as Wensicia in the Children of Dune miniseries (2003)
- First appearance: Children of Dune (1976)
- Last appearance: Paul of Dune (2008)
- Created by: Frank Herbert
- Portrayed by: Susan Sarandon (2003 series)

In-universe information
- Affiliation: House Corrino
- Spouse: Dalak
- Children: Farad'n
- Relatives: Shaddam IV (father); Anirul (mother); Irulan (sister); Chalice (sister); Josifa (sister); Rugi (sister)

Princess Wensicia is the third daughter of Padishah Emperor Shaddam IV and the Bene Gesserit Anirul, and the younger sister of Princess Irulan. In Children of Dune, Shaddam is dead and Wensicia plots from exile to restore House Corrino to its former glory by wresting control of the Imperial throne from the usurper, Paul Atreides, for her son, Farad'n. She attempts to assassinate Leto II and Ghanima Atreides, Paul's twin heirs, by sending mechanically controlled Laza tigers to hunt them in the desert. Leto's growing prescience allows him to thwart the attack on himself and his sister, and he pretends to be dead to escape the increasingly murderous ambitions of his father's sister Alia. Later, Farad'n, newly trained in the Bene Gesserit ways by Paul and Alia's mother Lady Jessica, accepts an arrangement brokered by Jessica for him to marry Ghanima and share the throne. His part of the deal is to "denounce and banish" Wensicia for Leto's murder, which he does. Leto later returns and ascends the throne himself.

Wensicia is described as "fair-haired" with a "heart-shaped face," and is said to have learned "shifty trickiness" from her sister Irulan but not herself been trained by the Bene Gesserit. Shaddam IV's heir is Wensicia's son Farad'n, whose deceased father, Dalak, is related to Count Fenring.

Wensicia is portrayed by Susan Sarandon in the 2003 miniseries. Sarandon told The New York Times, "One of the reasons I always loved the books was because they were driven by strong women, living outside the rules." She added that the Dune series "is very apropos to some of what's going on in the world today. It's about the dangers of fundamentalism and the idea that absolute power corrupts." The actress said of Wensicia, "She's just evil, evil, evil. I'm practically unrecognizable. It was a blast." Laura Fries of Variety wrote, "it's Susan Sarandon and Alice Krige [as Lady Jessica] who steal the thunder as opposing matriarchs of the great royal houses. Although the two never catfight, their ongoing struggle to rule the Dune dynasty gives this mini a real kick." Observing that Sarandon and Krige were "clearly relishing their roles", Fries added that "Sarandon makes a formidable enemy". Melanie McFarland of the Seattle Post-Intelligencer noted, "[Sarandon's] exiled princess may be the villain, cooking up deadly schemes, but we're right along with her in having a good time." Sarandon herself said, "it's always fun to play a smart villain." Not impressed overall with the acting in the miniseries, Ron Wertheimer of The New York Times wrote:

The exception is the piece's token movie star ... Susan Sarandon, having a high old time as the villain. Looking swell in slinky gowns and a collection of outer-space-deco headgear fitted with sensual silver antennas, Ms. Sarandon nearly winks into the camera. Her body language, her purring tone, the gleam in her evil eye, the curve of her evil eyebrow all declare, "Isn't this a hoot?" In another film, such a jarring note from a principal would sink it. But she's right; this is a hoot. Her mugging is part of the fun.

In the miniseries, Wensicia orchestrates the Dune Messiah conspiracy to assassinate Paul using a pre-programmed Tleilaxu ghola of his deceased friend Duncan Idaho, a plotline in which she is not involved in the novel. Emmet Asher-Perrin of Tor.com wrote:

There are a few clever changes made in order to connect the two stories better, the primary one being that rather than having Princess Irulan work as a conspirator against Paul alongside the Bene Gesserit, the Spacing Guild, and the Tleilaxu, her sister Wensicia is brought to the fore sooner and given that role. This has two advantages; it means that Irulan's love for Paul doesn't come out of left field the way it does at the end of Dune Messiah, and it means that the story spends more time with Wensicia ... who is played with antagonistic relish by Susan Sarandon.

Wensicia also appears in the novels Paul of Dune (2008) and Princess of Dune (2023) by Brian Herbert and Kevin J. Anderson.

=== Leto II Atreides ===
Leto II Atreides is the son of Paul Atreides and his Fremen concubine Chani, and the twin brother of Ghanima. Born at the end of Dune Messiah, Leto is orphaned soon after, as his mother dies in childbirth and his blinded father, following Fremen custom, walks out into the open desert to die. Paul's sister Alia subsequently serves as regent for the twins in Children of Dune, and Princess Irulan steps into the role of surrogate mother. Like Alia, Leto and Ghanima are "pre-born", having been awakened to adult consciousness and their genetic memories in the womb. The danger to individuals born this way, called Abomination by the Bene Gesserit, is that they are susceptible to being overtaken by their ancestral personas. Leto solves this problem by constructing his own personality out of an executive committee of his ancestors. Influenced by all the important ones, he cannot be possessed by an individual. Alia, however, is increasingly falling under the control of her late grandfather, Baron Vladimir Harkonnen, whose hatred of the Atreides puts the twins in danger and threatens to topple Paul's empire. Deposed Emperor Shaddam IV's daughter Wensicia, Irulan's younger sister, plots from exile to place her son Farad'n on the throne and executes an assassination attempt on nine-year-old Leto and Ghanima. The twins anticipate and survive the plot. Leto leaves to seek out the mysterious Preacher, who some believe is Paul himself, and Ghanima hypnotizes herself to believe that Leto is dead. Like his father Paul before him, Leto enters a spice trance induced by an overdose of melange. His visions show him myriad possible futures where humanity becomes extinct, and only one where it survives. He names this future "The Golden Path" and resolves to bring it to fruition—something that his father, who had already glimpsed this future, refused to do. Leto sacrifices his humanity to become a symbiont with the sandworm, beginning the transformation by allowing sandtrout, the larval stage of sandworms, to cover his body. The oversaturation of spice, and Leto's ability to adjust his body chemistry, fool the creatures into bonding with him, creating a membrane of "new skin" that bestows on him superhuman speed, strength and near-invulnerability. In addition, he will live for thousands of years, enough time to see his Golden Path to its completion. Leto returns to the capital where everyone has assembled for the wedding of Ghanima and Farad'n. Confronted by Leto and overcome by the Baron, Alia has a fleeting moment of self-control and leaps to her death. Leto declares himself Emperor, asserts control over the Fremen and restores Ghanima's genuine memories with a predetermined command. Farad'n pledges himself to Leto and delivers control of the remaining Sardaukar armies. Leto marries Ghanima to consolidate power, but Farad'n is her true consort so the Atreides line can continue.

Thirty-five hundred years later in God Emperor of Dune, the God Emperor Leto II is now almost fully transformed into a sandworm, retaining only his human face and arms. He is seemingly immortal and invulnerable to harm, but also prone to instinct-driven bouts of violence when provoked to anger. As a result, Leto's oppressive rule is one of religious awe and despotic fear. Widely known as the Tyrant, he has killed all other sandworms by terraforming Arrakis into a verdant planet, and his control of the remaining supply of melange guarantees his stranglehold on civilization. All of the former major powers, like the Bene Gesserit and Spacing Guild, have capitulated. Following his Golden Path, Leto has forced the human population into a state of trans-galactic stagnation: space travel is non-existent to most people in his Empire, which he has deliberately kept to a near-medieval level of technological sophistication. A string of Duncan Idaho gholas have served Leto over the millennia, though they are prone to eventually rebel against him. Ghanima's descendant Moneo Atreides is Leto's majordomo and closest confidant, while Moneo's daughter Siona has become the leader of a local rebellion against Leto. The Ixians send a new ambassador named Hwi Noree, and though Leto realizes that she has been specifically designed and trained to ensnare him, he cannot resist falling in love with her. Exposure to concentrated spice essence awakens Siona to Leto's Golden Path, and though she sees its importance, she remains dedicated to his destruction. Siona and the current Duncan Idaho overcome a searing mutual hatred of each other to plan Leto's assassination, of which the God Emperor is aware and has made possible. As Leto's wedding procession moves across a high bridge, the conspirators destroy the support beams, and Leto's entourage, including Hwi, plunge to their deaths into the river below. Leto's body rends apart in the water, the outer layer of sandtrout encysting the water and scurrying off, while the rest burns and disintegrates on the shore. A dying Leto reveals to Siona a secret aspect of his Golden Path: she is the result of a breeding scheme to produce a human who is invisible to prescient vision. Siona and her descendants will possess this ability, and Leto explains that humanity is now free from the domination of oracles, free to scatter throughout the universe, never again to face complete domination or complete destruction. After revealing the location of his secret spice hoard, Leto dies, leaving Duncan and Siona to face the task of managing the empire.

Leto is portrayed by James McAvoy in the 2003 miniseries. He will be portrayed by Nakoa-Wolf Momoa in the upcoming Denis Villeneuve film Dune: Part Three.

=== Ghanima Atreides ===
Ghanima Atreides
- Dune character
- First appearance: Dune Messiah (1969)
- Last appearance: The Winds of Dune (2009)
- Created by: Frank Herbert
- Portrayed by: Jessica Brooks (2003 series); Ida Brooke (2026 film)

In-universe information
- Affiliation: Fremen
- Family: House Atreides
- Spouse: Leto II Atreides
- Significant other: Farad'n
- Children: Many (unnamed)
- Relatives: Paul Atreides (father); Chani (mother); Leto II Atreides (brother); Leto Atreides the Elder (brother); Alia Atreides (aunt); Princess Irulan (stepmother); Leto I Atreides (grandfather); Lady Jessica (grandmother); Liet-Kynes (grandfather); Faroula (grandmother); Vladimir Harkonnen (great-grandfather)

Ghanima Atreides is the daughter of Paul Atreides and his Fremen concubine Chani, and the twin sister of Leto II. Born at the end of Dune Messiah, Ghanima is orphaned soon after, as her mother dies in childbirth and her blinded father, following Fremen custom, walks out into the open desert to die. Paul's sister Alia subsequently serves as regent for the twins in Children of Dune, and Princess Irulan steps into the role of surrogate mother. Like Alia, Leto and Ghanima are "pre-born", having been awakened to adult consciousness and their genetic memories in the womb. The danger to individuals born this way, called Abomination by the Bene Gesserit, is that they are susceptible to being overtaken by their ancestral personas. Leto solves this problem by constructing his own personality out of an executive committee of his ancestors. Influenced by all the important ones, he cannot be possessed by an individual. Alia, however, is increasingly falling under the control of her late grandfather, Baron Vladimir Harkonnen, whose hatred of the Atreides puts the twins in danger and threatens to topple Paul's empire. Deposed Emperor Shaddam IV's daughter Wensicia, Irulan's younger sister, plots from exile to place her son Farad'n on the throne and executes an assassination attempt on nine-year-old Leto and Ghanima. The twins anticipate and survive the plot. Leto leaves to seek out the mysterious Preacher, who some believe is Paul himself, and Ghanima hypnotizes herself to believe that Leto is dead. The intense mental discipline needed for this self-deception builds a safe haven in Ghanima's mind for her own personality to safely develop, with the persona of Chani acting as a guardian. Recognizing Alia as worsening threat, Fremen naib Stilgar takes Ghanima into hiding. Farad'n denounces his mother, and Alia, having retaken Ghanima, arranges a marriage between them. Knowing that Ghanima has sworn to kill him on their wedding night in revenge for Leto's "death", Alia intends to exploit the resulting chaos to weaken her enemies. Leto, having seen a prescient vision of humanity's only path to survival, has vowed to bring it to fruition and begun the necessary transformation to a human-sandworm hybrid. He returns to the capital where everyone has assembled for the wedding of Ghanima and Farad'n. Confronted by Leto and overcome by the Baron, Alia has a fleeting moment of self-control and leaps to her death. Leto declares himself Emperor, asserts control over the Fremen and restores Ghanima's genuine memories with a predetermined command. Farad'n pledges himself to Leto and delivers control of the remaining Sardaukar armies. Leto marries Ghanima to consolidate power, but Farad'n is her true consort so the Atreides line can continue.

Ghanima is portrayed by Jessica Brooks in the 2003 miniseries. Laura Fries of Variety wrote, "the mini picks up a great deal of charisma when [James] McAvoy [as Leto] and Brooks come aboard as the next generation of the house of Atreides." The characters Leto and Ghanima were aged from ten-year-olds to teens for the miniseries, which Emmet Asher-Perrin of Tor.com called "a smart move here, as finding two ten-year-old kids who had the ability to behave as though they had millennia of ancestral memory bubbling up inside of them was always going to be an impossibility." Asher-Perrin also called the rapport between Brooks and McAvoy "dazzling".

Ghanima will be played by Ida Brooke in the upcoming Denis Villeneuve film Dune: Part Three.

=== Tyekanik ===
Tyekanik is a Sardaukar officer who serves Princess Wensicia in Children of Dune. He is instrumental in her plot to assassinate the Atreides twins, Leto II and Ghanima, using mechanically controlled Laza tigers.

Tyekanik is portrayed by Marek Vašut in the 2003 miniseries.

=== Namri ===
Namri is the Fremen naib of Sietch Fondak, formerly known as Sietch Jacurutu, in Children of Dune. The Fremen of Fondak are called Iduali, or "water stealers", and shunned for a past transgression. Believing he is acting on orders from Lady Jessica, Gurney Halleck abducts a nine-year-old Leto II and brings him to Fondak, where Namri assists him in administering an overdose of the spice to Leto as a test. However, the test has actually been ordered by Leto's aunt Alia, possessed by the Baron Vladimir Harkonnen, and Namri has been told to kill Leto no matter the result. Leto escapes and Namri attempts to kill Gurney, who kills him instead.

Namri is portrayed by Predrag Bjelac in the 2003 miniseries.

=== Javid ===
Ziarenko Javid is the son of Namri and a High Priest of the Qizarate, the leaders of the religion which has risen around Paul Atreides. Possessed by the persona of Baron Vladimir Harkonnen, Paul's sister Alia takes Javid as her lover, infuriating her husband, Duncan Idaho. Duncan later kills Javid publicly in Sietch Tabr, partly out of revenge and partly to manipulate Stilgar into killing Duncan as a means to force Stilgar to join the rebellion against Alia.

Javid is portrayed by Rik Young in the 2003 miniseries.

=== Farad'n ===
Farad'n
- Dune character
- First appearance: Children of Dune (1976)
- Last appearance: Paul of Dune (2008)
- Created by: Frank Herbert
- Portrayed by: Jonathan Brüün (2003 series)

In-universe information
- Alias: Harq al-Ada
- Occupation: Royal Scribe
- Family: House Corrino
- Significant other: Ghanima Atreides
- Relatives: Wensicia (mother); Dalak (father); Shaddam IV (grandfather); Anirul (grandmother); Irulan (aunt); Chalice (aunt); Josifa (aunt); Rugi (aunt)

Farad'n is the son of Princess Wensicia, and the grandson of Shaddam IV. In Children of Dune, Shaddam is dead and Wensicia plots from exile to restore House Corrino to its former glory by wresting control of the Imperial throne from the usurper, Paul Atreides, for Farad'n. She attempts to assassinate Leto II and Ghanima Atreides, Paul's twin heirs, and though she fails, Leto pretends to be dead to escape the increasingly murderous ambitions of his father's sister Alia. Paul and Alia's mother, Lady Jessica, trains Farad'n in the Bene Gesserit ways as a preamble to an offer to marry Ghanima and share the throne. His part of the deal is to "denounce and banish" Wensicia for Leto's murder, which he does, but Ghanima intends to murder Farad'n on their wedding night as revenge. Leto reappears, now beginning the transformation into a human-sandworm hybrid, and ascends the throne himself. Leto, who is now physically incapable of siring children, commands Farad'n to father the future Atreides line as Ghanima's mate. Farad'n is also appointed as the Royal Scribe and renamed "Harq al-Ada" ("Breaking of the Habit"), and relinquishes his control of the remaining Sardaukar to Leto, effectively surrendering House Corrino's claim to the Imperial throne. Many of the chapter epigraphs in the novel are from the later writings of Farad'n (as Harq al-Ada) in his role as chronicler of the reign of Leto II.

Farad'n is portrayed by Jonathan Brüün in the 2003 miniseries.

=== Other ===
- Sabiha is Namri's niece and Javid's cousin, who cares for Leto II while he undergoes the spice trance at Fondak. Through his prescience, Leto sees a possible future in which Sabiha is his mate, but he chooses another path. They meet again later at Shuloch, where Leto begins his transformation into a human-sandworm hybrid, and Sabiha is among the first to witness his subsequent superhuman abilities. Sabiha is portrayed by Lana Likic in the 2003 miniseries.
- Assan Tariq is the teenage Fremen boy who serves as a guide to the Preacher, a mysterious blind man who is actually Paul Atreides. Tariq is the son of Muriz, a Fremen from the outcast Sietch Fondak. Tariq is portrayed by Viliam Docolomansky in the 2003 miniseries.
- Muriz is a Fremen Iduali from the outcast Sietch Fondak, and the father of Assan Tariq. In the 2003 miniseries, the mysterious Preacher, secretly a blinded Paul Atreides, publicly challenges the current state of his own religion, and Muriz stabs him to death. Muriz is in turn killed by Gurney Halleck. Muriz is portrayed by Zdenek Maryska in the miniseries.
- Buer Agarves is a Fremen warrior whom Alia Atreides takes as a lover after Stilgar joins the rebellion against her tyrannical rule. Alia sends Agarves to negotiate with Stilgar, naib of Sietch Tabr, for the return of her niece Ghanima Atreides and Princess Irulan, promising Agarves leadership of Tabr if he kills Stilgar. She uses a hidden tracker in Agarves' boots to raid the secret meeting, and Stilgar kills Agarves, as she planned.

== Introduced in God Emperor of Dune (1981) ==
=== Siona Atreides ===
Siona Ibn Fuad al-Seyefa Atreides (shortened to Siona Atreides) is the daughter of God Emperor Leto II's attendant and confidant Moneo, and a direct descendant of Leto's twin sister Ghanima and Farad'n Corrino. In God Emperor of Dune, Siona objects to Leto's tyrannical stranglehold on civilization, and leads a group of like-minded dissidents determined to depose Leto by any means necessary. Leto allows her to steal secret records from his archives, and she loses ten of her cohorts to Leto's D-wolves, barely escaping with her own life. Forced to join the Fish Speakers, an all-female army who obey Leto without question, Siona is further bristled by Leto's obvious desire to breed her with the latest Duncan Idaho ghola. Leto, who over the millennia has become a human-sandworm hybrid thanks to his fusion with sandtrout, the larval stage of sandworms, tests Siona by taking her out to the middle of the desert. She is careless in the use of her stillsuit to preserve moisture, and dehydration forces her to accept Leto's offer of spice essence from his body to replenish her. Awakened to Leto's Golden Path, the prophetic vision he follows to avert humanity's complete destruction, Siona is convinced of its importance, and better understands why he has ruled so harshly. But she remains dedicated to Leto's destruction, and an errant rainstorm demonstrates for her his mortal vulnerability to water. Leto has planned a Royal Procession to travel to his wedding to the Ixian ambassador Hwi Noree, and Siona and Idaho overcome a searing mutual hatred of each other to plan his assassination. As the procession moves across a high bridge over the Idaho River, Siona's associate, the Fish Speaker Nayla, destroys the support beams with a lasgun. The bridge collapses and Leto's entourage, including Moneo and Hwi, plunge to their deaths into the river below. Leto's body rends apart in the water, the outer layer of sandtrout encysting the water and scurrying off, while the rest burns and disintegrates on the shore. A dying Leto reveals a secret aspect of his Golden Path: Siona is the result of a breeding scheme to produce a human who is invisible to prescient vision. Siona and her descendants will possess this ability, and Leto explains that humanity is now free from the domination of oracles, free to scatter throughout the universe, never again to face complete domination or complete destruction. After revealing the location of his secret spice hoard, Leto dies, leaving Duncan and Siona to face the task of managing the empire.

=== Hwi Noree ===
Hwi Noree is the Ixian ambassador to Arrakis, and the niece of Malky, a previous Ixian ambassador who had been close to Leto II. In God Emperor of Dune, Leto is enchanted by the beautiful and charismatic Hwi, and though he realizes she has been specifically designed and trained to ensnare him, he cannot resist falling in love with her. Raised in secret in a no-chamber, she has been bred to appeal to what remains of Leto's humanity, a process guided by Malky himself. Though his transformation into a human-sandworm hybrid makes him incapable of physical intimacy, Leto proposes marriage and Hwi agrees. Duncan Idaho also falls in love with Hwi, and they fall into bed together. The resulting rivalry only worsens the rift between Leto and Duncan, who is driven to join Siona in her assassination plot against Leto. Hwi dies with Leto when their wedding procession crosses a sabotaged bridge, which collapses into the Idaho River below.

=== Anteac ===
Bene Gesserit Truthsayer Tertius Eileen Anteac comes to Arrakis with Luyseyal in God Emperor of Dune for an audience with the God Emperor Leto II that coincides with the Royal Festival held every ten years. They receive a message from Othwi Yake, Assistant to the Ixian ambassador, that Face Dancers have infiltrated the Ixian embassy, and are planning to assassinate Leto II. They try to warn Leto, but the message does not reach his convoy in time, though the plot fails, as Anteac and Luyseyal knew it would. They achieve little in their meeting with Leto II, and he takes the priceless vial of spice-essence with which they hoped to test his mortality. Leto reminds Luyseyal of the lesson learned from past over-machined societies: "The devices themselves condition the users to employ each other the way they employ machines." Later, Leto enlists Anteac's aid in detecting the Face Dancers, who by that time have replaced everyone in the Ixian embassy except the new ambassador, Hwi Noree. In particular, Anteac identifies the duplicate of Yake, who has been killed and replicated since the original sent his warning to Anteac. Leto's chief minister Moneo Atreides suggests to the God Emperor that Anteac is a secret Mentat, a skill prohibited in the Empire by Leto himself. Leto agrees but says that it amuses him. Hwi shares her knowledge of the environment in which she was brought up with Anteac, who has been conscripted by Leto to lead a Fish Speaker assault on Ix to wrest the secret of Hwi's origins. Anteac is shocked at the knowledge that Hwi is to marry Leto, and at the same time annoyed that The Bene Gesserit had allowed so talented a woman as Hwi to pass through their training program without turning her into one of them. With Anteac's faithful assistance, Leto's forces successfully invade Ix and capture Malky, Hwi's uncle and Leto's former friend, but Anteac is killed.

Some 1,500 years later in Chapterhouse: Dune the Duncan Idaho ghola recalls his past incarnation from the time of Leto II, noting that he had met with Anteac on orders from the God Emperor to suppress the Mentat school the Bene Gesserit had hidden on Wallach IX. It is also revealed that Reverend Mother Bellonda is a descendant of Anteac's.

=== Moneo Atreides ===
Moneo Atreides is Leto II's longtime majordomo and close confidant, the descendant of one of the Duncan Idaho gholas, the father of Siona with the Fish Speaker Seyefa, and a direct descendant of Leto's twin sister Ghanima and Farad'n Corrino. Like Siona, he was rebellious as a young man, leading a group of rebels dedicated to ending Leto's oppressive reign. He recognized that eliminating Leto would cast the universe into chaos, but that it would prompt a beneficial rebirth for humanity. In God Emperor of Dune, Moneo has long given up these efforts and now serves Leto with the utmost dedication, having seen the Golden Path for himself and recognized its importance in saving humanity from destruction. Moneo is killed during Leto's assassination, orchestrated by Siona and Duncan, when the bridge that Leto's procession is crossing is destroyed.

=== Nayla ===
Nayla is a fanatical Fish Speaker in the service of the God Emperor. Knowing of Siona Atreides and Duncan Idaho's plot against him, Leto has instructed Nayla to follow any order Siona gives her. When Siona tasks Nayla to assist in Leto's assassination by sabotaging the bridge he is traveling on, Nayla complies with fervor, damaging the supports with a lasgun. Leto, Hwi Noree and Moneo Atreides are among those killed in the collapse, and Duncan kills Nayla for her role in Hwi's death.

=== Chenoeh ===
Quintinius Violet Chenoeh, specially trained as an oral recorder, is sent by Syaksa to Arrakis with Tawsuoko on a fact-gathering mission in the same year as Anteac, prior to the events God Emperor of Dune. She is invited to converse with the God Emperor himself, and he is uncharacteristically indulgent of her questions and somewhat generous with his own information, however cryptic. Leto tells Chenoeh that he plans to restore "outward spiritual freedom" for mankind, and then refers to Siona Atreides as his "achievement", which the Sisterhood correctly interprets as being related to Leto's own breeding program. Leto then says, "You will return to your Superiors with my message, but these words keep secret for now. I will visit my rage upon your Sisterhood if you fail." Chenoeh complies, following Syaksa's own warning: "You must do nothing which will bring down his wrath upon us." Leto relates how he and his sister Ghanima were able to escape the disaster of Abomination, and also makes one of the earliest references to his secret journals, later found at Dar-es-Balat. He knows he will ultimately be perceived as a tyrant, and wishes to preserve his "feelings and motives ... lest history distort them too much." At the same time, he warns "Beware of the truth," and shares what he calls "the greatest mystery of all time" by which he composes his life: "The only past which endures lies wordlessly within you." Leto tells Chenoeh that by virtue of his taking her into his confidence, "You will become here an integral part of my myth. Our distant cousins will pray to you for intercession with me!" He also foretells her later death during her attempt at becoming a Reverend Mother through the spice agony. Chenoeh's account of their secret conversation is found after her death, and it is later noted that "the persistent Cult of Sister Chenoeh assumes new significance because of the journals' disclosures." Chenoeh and Tawsuoko also bring back to Chapterhouse proof (in the form of a written eyewitness account of Leto's statement) that, as rumored, Leto executed nine historians four centuries prior.

=== Other ===
- Malky is the Ixian ambassador to Arrakis prior to the events of God Emperor of Dune. In this capacity he becomes a close confidant to Leto, discussing controversial subjects and challenging the God Emperor as a subtle attempt at manipulation. Malky is recalled to Ix, and replaced by Iyo Kobat. In the novel, Malky's niece, Hwi Noree, is installed as the new Ixian ambassador. Leto soon learns that she has been designed and trained to ensnare him, and that Malky was complicit in the process. Leto sends a Fish Speaker force to Ix to capture Malky, who is brought back to Arrakis and murdered by Moneo.
- Luyseyal is a Bene Gesserit Truthsayer who comes to Arrakis with Anteac in God Emperor of Dune for an audience with the God Emperor Leto II that coincides with the Royal Festival held every ten years. They receive a message from Othwi Yake, assistant to the Ixian ambassador, that Face Dancers have infiltrated the Ixian embassy, and are planning to assassinate Leto II. Anteac and Luyseyal try to warn Leto, but the message does not reach his convoy in time, though the plot fails, as Anteac and Luyseyal knew it would. They achieve little in their meeting with Leto II, and he takes the priceless vial of spice-essence with which they hoped to test his mortality. Leto reminds Luyseyal of the lesson learned from past over-machined societies: "The devices themselves condition the users to employ each other the way they employ machines."
- Tawsuoko is a Bene Gesserit sent by Syaksa to Arrakis with Chenoeh on a fact-gathering mission the same year as Anteac, prior to the events God Emperor of Dune. In addition to the record of Chenoeh's somewhat enlightening conversations with the God Emperor, she and Chenoeh bring back to Chapterhouse proof (in the form of a written eyewitness account of Leto's statement) that, as rumored, Leto executed nine historians four centuries prior.
- Syaksa is a Bene Gesserit who sends Chenoeh and Tawsuoko to Arrakis on a fact-gathering mission the same year as Anteac, prior to the events God Emperor of Dune. Syaksa's warning to Chenoeh that "You must do nothing which will bring down his wrath upon us" encourages Chenoeh to obey the God Emperor's command to withhold certain of his statements from the Sisterhood. Syaksa and four other Reverend Mothers (Yitob, Mamulut, Eknekosk and Akeli) incorporate information gleaned from this mission into an "assessment of the state of the Empire" for that year. Syaksa believes that the religious character of the Fish Speakers is slowly being devolved under Leto II. She further attributes to him a motive based on the concept of hydraulic despotism, in which a government structure maintains power and control through exclusive control over a basic resource needed to live (in this case, melange), proposing that he is building the Empire toward an even greater dependence on the spice.

== Introduced in Heretics of Dune (1984) ==
=== Lucilla ===
Lucilla
- Dune character
- First appearance: Heretics of Dune (1984)
- Last appearance: Chapterhouse Dune (1985)
- Created by: Frank Herbert

In-universe information
- Affiliation: Bene Gesserit

Lucilla is a Bene Gesserit Reverend Mother and Imprinter. In Heretics of Dune, Bene Gesserit Mother Superior Taraza sends the young and attractive Lucilla to Gammu, formerly the Harkonnen homeworld Giedi Prime, to teach the teenage Duncan Idaho ghola whom the Sisterhood is raising there. Lucilla is also tasked with binding his loyalty to her, and thus the Bene Gesserit, through imprinting, while also protecting him from the negative influence—and possible peril—presented by dissenting Bene Gesserit who believe the ghola is a danger to the Sisterhood. Extremely precocious and already having divined the fact that he is a ghola, the young Duncan nurses hatred for the Bene Gesserit, hoping to escape their control of his life. He soon blossoms, however, under the training of Lucilla and Miles Teg, a male military commander of the Bene Gesserit brought out of retirement in part to protect the ghola. An attempt is made on Duncan's life, and Teg and Lucilla flee with Duncan into the countryside. They hide in a forgotten Harkonnen no-globe, during which time Teg is able to awaken Duncan to his original memories. This occurs before Lucilla has imprinted the ghola, and his new self-awareness now makes it impossible for her to attempt it. Teg arranges an extraction by his protégé Burzmali, but they are ambushed, and Teg sacrifices himself to capture while Lucilla and Duncan escape. Duncan attempts to get off Gammu undetected in the guise of a diminutive Tleilaxu Master, but is taken hostage. Lucilla and Burzmali arrive at a Bene Gesserit safehouse, but discover that it has been taken over by the fearsome Honored Matres, a violent matriarchal order from the farthest reaches of the universe who have been wreaking havoc and destruction on Tleilaxu worlds. Lucilla manages to impersonate an Honored Matre as one of their number, escaping with Duncan and an Honored Matre prisoner, Murbella. Teg commandeers an Honored Matre no-ship and flees with Lucilla, Duncan and a captive Murbella.

In Chapterhouse: Dune, Lucilla has been transferred to the planet Lampadas to oversee a Bene Gesserit education center located there. She manages to escape before the Honored Matres destroy the planet, carrying the shared memories of its millions of Reverend Mothers. Her ship is damaged by a mine and she is forced to land on Gammu, where she takes refuge with a hidden colony of Jews, knowing that they will be sympathetic to her. The Jews had fled Earth thousands of years earlier in order to escape relentless persecution, and they now practice their religion in secret to maintain their ties to ancient history. The Bene Gesserit, with their own method of connecting to their past, have cultivated a relationship with the Jews. The leader of this settlement gives Lucilla shelter, but ultimately has to turn her over to the Honored Matres in order to save his people from destruction at their hands. Before doing so, however, he introduces Lucilla to Rebecca, a "wild" Reverend Mother who has gained her Other Memories without Bene Gesserit training. Lucilla shares minds with Rebecca, who promises to take the memories of Lampadas safely back to the Sisterhood. The Honored Matres capture Lucilla and bring her before the Great Honored Matre Dama, who surprises everyone present by declining to kill her outright. Dama tries to persuade Lucilla to join the Honored Matres, preserving her life in exchange for Bene Gesserit secrets. Dama is especially interested in the Bene Gesserit ability to modify their biochemistry and render toxins harmless, prompting Lucilla to speculate that the Honored Matres were driven out of the Scattering by an enemy who used biological weapons. These conversations with Lucilla continue for weeks, and she reveals to Dama that, although the Bene Gesserit know how to manipulate and control the populace, they practice and believe in democracy. Dama's desire to destroy the Sisterhood is redoubled when she discovers that the Bene Gesserit teach this dangerous knowledge, and she kills Lucilla.

Lucilla is described as a near copy of the elite Reverend Mother Darwi Odrade, from her physical appearance to the sound of her voice. The two women are not directly related, but are instead the products of parallel breeding lines.

=== Miles Teg ===
Miles Teg
- Dune character
- First appearance: Heretics of Dune (1984)
- Last appearance: Sandworms of Dune (2007)
- Created by: Frank Herbert

In-universe information
- Title: Bashar
- Occupation: Military commander
- Affiliation: Bene Gesserit
- Spouse: Unnamed wife
- Children: Darwi Odrade; Dimela; Unnamed others
- Relatives: Janet Roxbrough (mother); Loschy Teg (father); Sabine (brother); Three grandchildren by Dimela

Miles Teg is a Mentat and the former Supreme Bashar of the Bene Gesserit, their leading military commander. In Heretics of Dune, Bene Gesserit Mother Superior Taraza summons Teg out of retirement to take over the weapons training of the newest Duncan Idaho ghola, still a teenager, on Gammu. Teg, Duncan and Bene Gesserit Reverend Mother Lucilla flee an attempt on Duncan's life, and hide in a long-forgotten Harkonnen no-globe discovered by Teg's aide, Patrin. Teg uses his strong resemblance to his ancestor Duke Leto Atreides, to whom the original Idaho was fiercely loyal, and a variety of relentless physical and mental attacks to awaken Duncan to his original memories. Teg arranges an extraction by his protégé Burzmali, but they are ambushed, and Teg sacrifices himself to capture by the Honored Matres to allow Lucilla and Duncan to escape. Teg is tortured using a T-Probe, and under the severe stress and agony produced by the probe's attempts to gain control of his body and his knowledge, his Mentat abilities and Atreides genes elevate him to a higher level of being. He is able to move faster than the eye can see by accelerating his metabolism, and he gains mild prescience, which he describes as a doubled vision which gives him intimations of danger. His accelerated speed comes at the cost of incredible energy expenditure, requiring him to consume enormous amounts of food. After escaping his captors, he finds that his safehouse had been taken over by Honored Matres, who attempt to gain his allegiance. Seeing the terrible state their constant drive for power and contempt for the masses has lowered them to, he uses his incredible speed to slaughter them and escape once more. Teg gathers a force of veterans who had served under him on previous campaigns from the bars of Ysai and captures an Honored Matre no-ship using his tactical genius and new abilities. He flees the planet with Lucilla, Duncan and a captive Honored Matre, Murbella. Journeying to Rakis, Teg hands off Duncan and Lucilla to the Bene Gesserits Sheeana and Darwi Odrade, the latter of which is revealed to be his daughter. As the others escape, Teg goads the Honored Matres, who incinerate the entire planet with their Obliterator weapons to be sure Teg is killed.

A ghola of Teg is birthed in Chapterhouse: Dune on orders from Odrade, who is now Mother Superior of the Bene Gesserit after Taraza's death in the battle at Rakis. Odrade needs Teg's military abilities to thwart the worsening threat of the Honored Matres. The Bene Gesserit later reawaken him to his full memories prematurely by using Sheeana to imprint him. As the original Teg has been trained by his mother to resist such manipulation, the attempt subjects the Teg ghola to a heightened amount of stress which also unlocks the superhuman abilities previously acquired by Teg under Honored Matre torture. A reawakened Teg leads the final assault upon the Honored Matres, but is captured when the Matres pretend to surrender. Murbella, a captive Honored Matre indoctrinated into the Bene Gesserit, kills the Honored Matre leader Logno at the same time Bene Gesserit Mother Superior Odrade is killed, and Murbella manages to secure the leadership of both groups. Teg is released, later joining Sheeana and Duncan Idaho when they escape Bene Gesserit control in a no-ship.

The adult Teg is described as 296 years old but still vital, and has a striking resemblance to his ancestor, Leto Atreides. The son of the Bene Gesserit Lady Janet Roxbrough (a Fish Speaker descendant) and Loschy Teg, a "CHOAM station factor" who was chosen for breeding by the Sisterhood for his "gene potential," Miles had been instructed in the Bene Gesserit ways by his mother before being sent to Lampadas to train as a Mentat. Teg is a military genius, having a very strong sense of honor, loyalty, and many of the characteristics of House Atreides, his ancestors. He is well known for doing the unexpected. Teg is also not a spice addict, as is common with most other people, not even resorting to the spice at old age when most others might wish to use it to extend their lives. By the time of Heretics of Dune, Teg's wife had been dead for 38 years, his grown children living elsewhere except for his eldest daughter Dimela. She and her husband Firus take control of Teg's farm when he leaves his homeworld Lernaeus, and the couple have three children. Teg had a younger brother, Sabine, who had been poisoned on Romo. In Heretics of Dune, it is revealed that Teg had fathered other children during his younger years, one of whom is Odrade.

Teg also appears in the sequel novels Hunters of Dune and Sandworms of Dune by Brian Herbert and Kevin J. Anderson. In Hunters of Dune, Duncan and Teg run the affairs on the no-ship, being the only two passengers with experience in military leadership. Teg considers himself responsible for the security of the ship and its vital cargo of historical gholas, produced in transit from genetic material possessed by captive passenger Scytale, purportedly the last Tleilaxu Master. In Sandworms of Dune, mysterious saboteurs conduct crippling attacks on the no-ship's systems. Teg and Duncan discover that Face Dancers have infiltrated the ship, but not before they are led directly to the "Unknown Enemy" who have been stalking the ship for years: Daniel and Marty, incarnations of the ancient thinking machines Omnius and Erasmus. The critically damaged no-ship is caught in the thinking machine tachyon net, and Teg uses his accelerated metabolism to both repair the ship and launch countermeasures against the attacking machines. Though he has consumed vast quantities of melange and carbohydrates from the ship's stores to complete his task, Teg dies from massive cellular exhaustion. Duncan is unable to free the ship, and it is taken to the machine world Synchrony. En route, Duncan and Sheeana release the husk that is left of Teg's body into space, vowing that the Bashar will never be captured by the Enemy. Later, after the machines are defeated, Duncan asks Scytale for a new ghola of Teg, whom he will need at his side in his new position as the bridge between both mankind and machines.

=== Murbella ===
Murbella
- Dune character
- First appearance: Heretics of Dune (1984)
- Last appearance: Sandworms of Dune (2007)
- Created by: Frank Herbert

In-universe information
- Title: Mother Commander
- Occupation: Reverend Mother
- Affiliation: Honored Matres; Bene Gesserit
- Sequel children: Rinya; Janess; Gianne; Tanidia

Murbella is a young Honored Matre who defects to the Bene Gesserit. In Heretics of Dune, the violent Honored Matres capture the teenage Duncan Idaho ghola, who is loyal to their enemies, the Bene Gesserit. Young Honored Matre Murbella is tasked to use her sexual imprinting talents to enslave Duncan to force his allegiance to them. The Tleilaxu have secretly programmed the ghola with the male equivalent to the Honored Matres' imprinting power, which is unlocked by Murbella's attempt. Duncan and Murbella imprint each other, and in her weakened condition Murbella is easily captured by the Bene Gesserit. Her new addiction to Duncan keeps Murbella subdued, and the Bene Gesserit soon begin to train her as one of them, though they do not completely trust her. In Chapterhouse: Dune, Duncan and Murbella's mutual imprinting has made them reluctant lovers. Murbella collapses under the pressure of training and her pregnancy, but realizes that she admires and wants to be Bene Gesserit. Murbella submits to the spice agony to become a Bene Gesserit Reverend Mother, and survives. During a Bene Gesserit attack on the Honored Matres, Murbella kills the Great Honored Matre Logno with her Bene Gesserit-enhanced fighting skills, and the Honored Matres are awed by her physical prowess. The Bene Gesserit Mother Superior Darwi Odrade is also killed, and Murbella secures the leadership of both groups, per Odrade's plan. Murbella intends to merge the two orders into a New Sisterhood, which displeases some of the Bene Gesserit. The dissenters flee Chapterhouse with Duncan, Miles Teg, and Sheeana in a no-ship, and Murbella realizes their plan too late to stop them.

Murbella also appears in the sequel novels Hunters of Dune and Sandworms of Dune by Brian Herbert and Kevin J. Anderson. In Hunters of Dune, Murbella takes the title Mother Commander. She has four daughters by Duncan: Rinya, Janess, Tanidia and Gianne. Murbella searches her Other Memory for the origin of the Honored Matres. She discovers that they are descendants of rogue Bene Gesserits and Tleilaxu females, originally used as axlotl tanks and freed by Fish Speakers, who allied in the Scattering. Murbella also discovers that the Honored Matres' "outside enemy" are thinking machines, provoked when the Honored Matres stole technologically advanced weapons, including Obliterators, from them. In Sandworms of Dune, Murbella now knows that the sentient computer network Omnius and his thinking machine forces are coming, and attempts to rally humankind for a last stand against the thinking machines. She commissions the scientists of Ix to copy the destructive Obliterators for use on the fleet of warships she has ordered from the Spacing Guild. However, Ix is now secretly controlled by Face Dancer leader Khrone. When Murbella is ready to launch her fleet, the Obliterators and Ixian navigation devices all suddenly fail, which Murbella realizes is sabotage. The Oracle of Time appears, destroying Omnius and the thinking machines with her own armada. Murbella is reunited with Duncan, who intends to end the divide between humans and thinking machines, allowing the two to co-exist.

=== Darwi Odrade ===
Darwi Odrade is an elite Bene Gesserit Reverend Mother and Atreides descendant. In Heretics of Dune, the "wild talents" of the Atreides bloodline that Odrade displays intermittently are what the Bene Gesserit both fear and desperately need. The suspicious Reverend Mother Bellonda scrutinizes Odrade continually, looking for reasons to terminate her, while Mother Superior Taraza senses that the Sisterhood needs Odrade's limited Atreides prescience to avert imminent destruction at the hands of the Honored Matres. Taraza tasks Odrade to take over the Bene Gesserit Keep on the planet Arrakis, and take under her protection the foundling girl Sheeana, who has the natural ability to control the giant sandworms. Recognizing Sheeana's value to the Sisterhood, Odrade begins training her as a Bene Gesserit acolyte. Meanwhile, an anonymous document referred to as the Atreides Manifesto surfaces, attacking all religions in the known universe except for that of the Bene Tleilax. This creates a furor with the intensely religious Tleilaxu, who have long nursed dreams of hegemony, dominating the universe with their religion. The Tleilaxu council decides to treat the Manifesto as a gift from God, and they spread it far and wide. It is later revealed that the Manifesto was in fact written by Odrade. When Taraza is killed after a showdown with the Honored Matres on Arrakis, Odrade becomes Mother Superior.

In Chapterhouse Dune (1985), Odrade is accompanied by Tamalane, Dortujla and the acolyte Suipol to meet the Great Honored Matre Dama on Junction, as retired Bene Gesserit Supreme Bashar Miles Teg leads a force to attack Gammu. With the planet about to fall, the Honored Matres activate their "weapon of last resort", turning victory into defeat and holding Odrade captive. Tamalane, Dortujla, and Suipol are killed. As planned with Odrade previously, Honored Matre-turned-Bene Gesserit Murbella travels to Junction alone, pretending to have escaped the Bene Gesserit with their unique abilities and the location of their hidden homeworld, Chapterhouse. Murbella is brought before the new Great Honored Matre Logno, who has just killed her predecessor Dama and has Odrade standing nearby, unrestrained in a gesture of contempt. Murbella provokes and kills Logno, while simultaneously the Honored Matre Elpek kills Odrade. With both of these deaths, Murbella becomes the new Mother Superior as well as Great Honored Matre, fulfilling Odrade's intentions.

Odrade is secretly the daughter of military commander Teg, and her "care with details" makes her, like Teg, most suited for duties related to security. The younger Reverend Mother and Imprinter Lucilla is described as a near copy of Odrade, from her physical appearance to the sound of her voice. The two women are not directly related, but are instead the products of parallel breeding lines. As the Bene Gesserit are wary of the historical unpredictability of Atreides genes, it is noted in Heretics of Dune that her offspring receive "careful examination", and that "two of those offspring had been quietly put to death."

=== Sheeana ===
Sheeana Brugh is a young girl native to Rakis (formerly Arrakis) who possesses the unique ability to control the giant sandworms that roam the desert planet. In Heretics of Dune, Sheeana's talent is revealed after her impoverished village is wiped out by a sandworm which refuses to harm her, and then whisks her to the capital city of Keen (formerly Arrakeen) when she climbs onto its back in the long-forbidden Fremen tradition. Sheeana is soon recognized as the "sandrider" predicted by Leto II, and worshipped by the priesthood of Rakis. As she matures to adulthood, Sheeana effectively assumes control of the priesthood. Her popularity and religious aura have increased both on and off Rakis, and the priests, believing her a prophet, are compelled to follow even her most unorthodox commands. The Bene Gesserit, who have their own plans for Sheeana and have secretly guided her education, thwart an assassination attempt on her, and unofficially take control of Sheeana, the priesthood and Rakis. Reverend Mother Darwi Odrade begins Sheeana's formal Bene Gesserit training. Mother Superior Taraza is soon pleased with Sheeana's progress, and considers a secondary plan of seeding other planets with sandworms with Sheeana's help. Rakis itself is destroyed by the vengeful Honored Matres. In Chapterhouse: Dune, Sheeana is now in charge of the project to breed sandworms on the secret Bene Gesserit world, Chapterhouse. She becomes a full Reverend Mother but remains very independent, with mysterious depths. Disagreeing with the plans of new Bene Gesserit leader Murbella, Sheeana chooses to escape Chapterhouse on an untraceable no-ship with the like-minded Duncan Idaho ghola and a number of other passengers.

Sheeana also appears in the sequel novels Hunters of Dune and Sandworms of Dune by Brian Herbert and Kevin J. Anderson. In Hunters of Dune, Sheeana and Duncan lead the no-ship in their journey to flee the Unknown Enemy that pursues them. Sheeana decides that they need to make new gholas of former heroes using the genetic material carried by the last Tleilaxu Master, Scytale.

=== Tylwyth Waff ===
Tylwyth Waff
- Dune character
- First appearance: Heretics of Dune (1984)
- Last appearance: Sandworms of Dune (2007)
- Created by: Frank Herbert

In-universe information
- Title: Tleilaxu Master
- Affiliation: Bene Tleilax

Tylwyth Waff is a Tleilaxu Master and the leader of the Bene Tleilax, a secretive race of genetic manipulators who traffic in biological products such as artificial eyes, gholas, and "twisted" Mentats. Waff is described as "an elfin figure barely a meter and a half tall. Eyes, hair, and skin were shades of gray, all a stage for the oval face with its tiny mouth and line of sharp teeth". In Heretics of Dune, Waff successfully replaces High Priest Hedley Tuek with a Face Dancer duplicate loyal to the Tleilaxi, but loses control of the impostor due to its eventual complete assimilation into its new form. Traveling to Rakis, Waff decides to ally with the Bene Gesserit after he is tricked into believing that they share the secret religious beliefs of the Tleilaxu. He is killed along with the entire population of Rakis when the Honored Matres destroy the planet in revenge for Miles Teg's slaughter of their members. Meanwhile, he has a replacement ghola growing for himself in Bandalong, the capital city of the Tleilaxu homeworld, Tleilax.

Waff also appears in the sequel novels Hunters of Dune and Sandworms of Dune by Brian Herbert and Kevin J. Anderson. In Hunters of Dune, the Honored Matres who conquered Tleilax have kept several of Waff's gholas alive, but in vegetative states. In order to recover the supposedly "lost" secret to producing melange in axlotl tanks, the Lost Tleilaxu scribe Uxtal is tasked to create new gholas from Waff's genetic material. Uxtal accelerates the process artificially, and of the first batch of eight Waff gholas, seven fail to regain their memories and are viciously killed. The massacre shocks the last ghola into regaining some of Waff's memories, but not enough to recreate the melange process. Later, the Waff ghola escapes the Bene Gesserit attack on Tleilax, finding refuge with the Spacing Guild by offering Guild Navigator Edrik the genetic knowledge for the Guild to create their own, optimized sandworms to produce melange. In Sandworms of Dune, Waff alters the DNA of the sandworm's larval sandtrout stage to create an aquatic form of the worms, which are then released into the oceans of Buzzell. Adapting to their new environment, these "seaworms" quickly flourish, eventually producing a highly concentrated form of melange, dubbed "ultraspice". Waff makes a pilgrimage to Rakis, original homeworld of the sandworms, and sacrifices himself to a worm, which to him is an embodiment of God.

=== Bellonda ===
Bellonda is a Bene Gesserit Reverend Mother and the chief Mentat-Archivist counselor to Mother Superior Taraza in Heretics of Dune. After Taraza's death, Bellonda serves new Mother Superior Darwi Odrade in the same function in Chapterhouse: Dune. During a conversation with the Duncan Idaho ghola it is revealed that Bellonda is a descendant of Anteac, an important Reverend Mother from the time of the God Emperor Leto II.

Bellonda also appears in the sequel novel Hunters of Dune by Brian Herbert and Kevin J. Anderson. In the novel, Bellonda is one of the few Bene Gesserit with access to the Bene Gesserit's sensitive breeding records, and one of even fewer possessing the memories of all the Mothers Superior. Bellonda suspects that the Honored Matres had originally been Reverend Mothers sent out in the Scattering, and calculates that melange withdrawal and hypnosis had caused them to deny their origins. Bellonda is later killed in a duel by her Spice Operations Director partner and nemesis, the former Honored Matre Doria. An outraged Mother Commander Murbella, leader of the merged New Sisterhood of Bene Gesserit and Honored Matres, forces Doria to share minds with Bellonda before her memories are lost forever.

=== Taraza ===
Alma Mavis Taraza is the Bene Gesserit Mother Superior in Heretics of Dune who brings former Supreme Bashar Miles Teg reluctantly out of retirement to guard the latest Duncan Idaho ghola. Taraza blackmails Tleilaxu Master Waff to find out all he knows about the invading Honored Matres, as well as the fact that the Bene Tleilax have programmed their own agenda within the ghola. She also manages to divine that Waff is a secret Zensufi, which finally gives the Sisterhood a way to manipulate the Tleilaxu. Reverend Mother Darwi Odrade subsequently uses this knowledge of Waff's religious beliefs to form an alliance with him. As Tleilaxu axlotl tanks are the only other source of melange besides Rakis, this alliance will be essential when Taraza executes her ultimate plan: to destroy Rakis and free humanity from Leto II's own plan. The discovery of a girl with the ability to control sandworms prompts Taraza to consider a secondary plan of seeding other planets with them. The Honored Matres are goaded into attacking Rakis and Taraza is killed, but not before she is able to share Other Memory with Odrade, who escapes.

=== Burzmali ===
Alef Burzmali is Miles Teg's protégé in the Bene Gesserit military who became Supreme Bashar after Teg's retirement. In Heretics of Dune, he aids Teg in extracting the Duncan Idaho ghola and Bene Gesserit Reverend Mother Lucilla from their hiding place on Gammu. When Duncan is captured by the Honored Matres, Lucilla impersonates one of them, with Burzmali playing her sexual slave, to access the building where Duncan is being held. Burzmali dies attempting to protect the planet Lampadas from a catastrophic attack by Honored Matres in Chapterhouse Dune.

=== Hedley Tuek ===
Hedley Tuek is the High Priest of the Rakian Priesthood, and a descendant of the melange smuggler Esmar Tuek. Tleilaxu Master Waff has Tuek killed and replaced by a Face Dancer, a genetically engineered mimic, but loses control of the duplicate due to its eventual complete assimilation into its new form.

=== Other ===
- Schwangyu is the Bene Gesserit in charge of the Duncan Idaho ghola project on Gammu in Heretics of Dune. As the leader of a faction of the Sisterhood who believe that such gholas are a danger to the order and its goals, she has been subtly encouraging the ghola's failure. By the time Lucilla arrives to teach Duncan and bind his loyalty to the Sisterhood with sexual imprinting, he has already been tarnished by Schwangyu, and nurses hatred for the Bene Gesserit and a desire to escape their control. Despite Schwangyu's efforts to seduce Lucilla to her side, Duncan blossoms under the training of Lucilla and Miles Teg, and Schwangyu begins to realize that she has much underestimated Lucilla. Schwangyu betrays Teg, Lucilla, and Duncan to the Tleilaxu, allowing them to attack the keep on Gammu where Duncan is being trained, but the Tleilaxu forces kill her during the strike.
- Tamalane is a Bene Gesserit who is one of the Duncan Idaho ghola's first chief instructors on Gammu in the events before Heretics of Dune. Tamalane is one of Mother Superior Odrade's advisors in Chapterhouse: Dune, and accompanies Odrade, Dortujla and the acolyte Suipol to meet the Great Honored Matre Dama on Junction as Miles Teg leads a force to attack Gammu. Tamalane and her party are eventually slain by the Honored Matres, but the Bene Gesserit conquest proves successful with Murbella left as leader to both the Bene Gesserit and the Honored Matres.
- Hesterion is the Bene Gesserit Archivist counselor and advisor to Mother Superior Taraza in Heretics of Dune. She is one of very few sisters with access to sensitive breeding records, and is the first advisor to correctly suggest that the Tleilaxu ambition is to produce a complete prana-bindu mimic.
- Lady Janet Roxbrough is the Bene Gesserit mother of Supreme Bashar Miles Teg, who teaches him the Bene Gesserit ways in his youth, prior to Heretics of Dune.
- Carlana is a young Bene Gesserit acolyte whom Miles Teg meets as a child. While the Honored Matres interrogate an adult Miles with a T-Probe in Heretics of Dune, he recalls a visit from the Sisterhood to his Bene Gesserit mother, Lady Janet Roxbrough. Miles is left talking with one of the visitor's young acolytes, Carlana, who unsuccessfully tries her "fledging skills" on the eleven-year-old Teg. Miles, who has been well-instructed by his mother, can easily see through Carlana and manipulates her in return. Carlana is described as having red-blond hair, a doll's face with green-gray eyes and upturned nose, and an "inflated view of her own attractions."
- Geasa is a Bene Gesserit who had been the Duncan Idaho ghola's first chief instructor prior to the events of Heretics of Dune. She had become very attached to him, but had been sent away after allowing him to discover (at age eight) that he is a ghola.

== Introduced in Chapterhouse: Dune (1985) ==
=== Rebecca ===
Rebecca is a "wild" Reverend Mother who lives among a secret community of Jews on Gammu. In Chapterhouse: Dune, Bene Gesserit Reverend Mother Lucilla is fleeing the destruction of the planet Lampadas by the Honored Matres and is forced to land on Gammu. Once there, she seeks out a hidden settlement of Jews, whom she knows will give her sanctuary. They are obligated to turn her over to the Honored Matres to assure their own survival, but Lucilla, who is carrying the priceless shared-minds of all the Reverend Mothers of Lampadas, is able to share minds with Rebecca and pass on this knowledge before being captured by the Honored Matres. Rebecca and the Jews eventually escape Gammu with the Bene Gesserit forces, and Rebecca is able to pass on the 7,622,014 Lampadas shared-minds to the Sisterhood.

In the sequel novel Hunters of Dune by Brian Herbert and Kevin J. Anderson, Rebecca is aboard the untraceable no-ship which Sheeana and Duncan Idaho use to flee the Bene Gesserit planet Chapterhouse. Rebecca later offers herself as a volunteer to become one of the axlotl tanks used to produce the important gholas of Paul Atreides, Leto II and others.

=== Daniel and Marty ===
Daniel and Marty are a pair of mysterious observers with advanced technological powers introduced in Chapterhouse: Dune. Duncan Idaho sees the duo in a vision and determines that they are likely Face Dancers, the shapeshifting minions of the Tleilaxu, though atypically autonomous ones. In the final chapter of the novel, Daniel and Marty observe the escape of the no-ship from Chapterhouse and confirm that they are independent Face Dancers. They acknowledge that Tleilaxu Masters created them and express some deference, but also assert their independence and indicate that their ability to absorb the memories and experiences of other people made their autonomy inevitable. Daniel and Marty hint that they observe and are familiar with various groups in the universe, and allude to their desire to capture and study the passengers of the no-ship.

Herbert's 1986 death "left fans with an über-cliffhanger" for twenty years, until his son Brian Herbert and author Kevin J. Anderson published two sequels to the original series, Hunters of Dune and Sandworms of Dune.

In Hunters of Dune, Daniel and Marty are in constant pursuit of the escaped no-ship, on which they believe is the Kwisatz Haderach they require to be victorious in the imminent and long-foretold "battle at the end of the universe" known as kralizec. Their Face Dancer minion Khrone is executing a parallel plan to create their own Kwisatz Haderach, using a Paul Atreides ghola that will be conditioned by a ghola of the Baron Harkonnen. Daniel and Marty themselves have the ability to create illusions, and to inflict pain on any human. It is eventually revealed that Daniel and Marty are not, in fact, Face Dancers: they are actually incarnations of the thinking machines Omnius (Daniel) and Erasmus (Marty), introduced in the Legends of Dune prequel trilogy by Brian Herbert and Anderson. In the third Legends novel Dune: The Battle of Corrin, Omnius had sent out a last blast of information before being destroyed in the Battle of Corrin. This signal had eventually connected with one of the probes disseminated from Giedi Prime several years earlier, uploading versions of Erasmus and Omnius.

In Sandworms of Dune, Omnius and Erasmus finally capture the no-ship and pit the Paul ghola on board against their own twisted version, Paolo, in a duel to the death that will leave them with the strongest of the two. Paul survives, but realizes that Duncan is actually the "ultimate Kwisatz Haderach" that Omnius has been seeking. The Oracle of Time, the immortal founder of the Spacing Guild, transports every aspect of the Omnius network into another dimension forever. Erasmus offers Duncan the choice between continuing their war or ending it. Duncan chooses peace over victory, and he and Erasmus merge minds. Erasmus imparts Duncan with all the codes required to run the Synchronized Worlds, as well as all of Erasmus' knowledge, setting Duncan as the bridge between humans and machines to permanently end the divide and ensure that the two may co-exist. With little left for him, Erasmus again expresses his desire to learn everything possible about what it is to be human—and asks Duncan to deactivate him so that he may experience "death".

William F. Touponce states unequivocally that Daniel and Marty are Face Dancers in his 1988 book Frank Herbert, explaining "Herbert gives us a segment narrated from their point of view only at the very end of the novel. They are offshoots of the Tleilaxu Face Dancers sent out in The Scattering and have become almost godlike because of their capacity to assume the persona of whoever they kill—and they have been doing this for centuries, capturing Mentats and Tleilaxu Masters and whatever else they could assimilate, until now they play with whole planets and civilizations. They are weirdly benign when they first appear in the visions of Duncan Idaho as a calm elderly couple working in a flower garden, trying to capture him in their net". In an August 2007 review of Sandworms of Dune, John C. Snider of SciFiDimensions.com argues that it "doesn't fit" or "add up" that Frank Herbert's Daniel and Marty are the "malevolent" thinking machines Brian Herbert and Anderson created in their Legends of Dune prequel novels. He further wonders why "Omnius, long established as puzzled by and averse to human unpredictability, would want to breed that ultimate ungovernable—a Kwisatz Haderach".

=== Dama ===
Great Honored Matre Dama is the Honored Matre leader on Junction in Chapterhouse Dune, and is called the "Spider Queen" by the Bene Gesserit leader Darwi Odrade. Bene Gesserit Reverend Mother Lucilla flees the destruction of Lampadas by the Honored Matres, but is forced to land on Gammu. She is captured and brought before Dama, but not killed outright. Dama tries to persuade Lucilla to join the Honored Matres, preserving her life in exchange for Bene Gesserit secrets. Dama does not try to hide the fact that the Matres dearly want to learn to modify their biochemistry as the Bene Gesserit do. These conversations with Lucilla continue for weeks. When she reveals to Dama that, although the Bene Gesserit know how to manipulate and control the populace, they practice and believe in democracy, Dama's desire to destroy the Sisterhood is redoubled when she discovers the Bene Gesserit teach this dangerous knowledge. Dama kills Lucilla, and then meets with Mother Superior Odrade. Dama at first seems surprisingly cooperative, but Odrade soon realizes that Dama intends no reasonable negotiation. Under cover of Odrade's diplomacy, the Bene Gesserit forces under Miles Teg attack Junction with tremendous force. Dama's chief advisor Logno assassinates Dama with poison, and assumes control of the Honored Matres.

=== Logno ===
Logno is the chief advisor to Great Honored Matre Dama on Junction. In Chapterhouse Dune, Logno assassinates Dama with poison while the Bene Gesserit forces are attacking Junction. Logno assumes control of the Honored Matres and immediately surrenders. Bene Gesserit leader Odrade is surprised, but she and Miles Teg soon realize they have fallen into a trap. The Honored Matres use a weapon of mass destruction and turn defeat into victory. Murbella saves as much of the Bene Gesserit force as she can, and they begin to withdraw to Chapterhouse. Odrade, however, had planned for the possible failure of the Bene Gesserit attack and left Murbella instructions for a last desperate gamble. Murbella pilots a small craft down to the surface, announcing herself as an Honored Matre who, in the confusion, has managed to escape the Bene Gesserit with all their secrets. She arrives on the planet and immediately announces her intentions by killing an overeager Honored Matre with blinding speed enhanced by Bene Gesserit training that makes her faster than any Honored Matre before her. Murbella is taken to Logno, and immediately declares herself hostile. Logno cannot help herself and attacks, and Murbella handily kills her and some of her allies. Murbella takes charge of the Honored Matres, who are awed by her physical prowess.

=== Dortujla ===
Dortujla is the head of the Bene Gesserit keep on the cold aquatic planet Buzzell, having been sent there as punishment for the so-called "Jessica crime"—a love affair, forbidden by the Bene Gesserit as a weakness that could compromise their performance. In Chapterhouse: Dune, Dortujla comes to Odrade on Chapterhouse to report that humanoid Handlers and their half-man/half-cat enslaved Futars have offered alliance against the Honored Matres, who have yet to make a move on Buzzell. Dortujla's Mentat analysis, however, suggests that the Handlers somehow intend dominance, and that the Matres intend to colonize Buzzell. Odrade sees an opportunity, and orders Dortujla to return to Buzzell and make contact with the Honored Matres, brokering a meeting between Odrade and their leader in which the Bene Gesserit will supposedly surrender. Dortujla is tortured by the Honored Matres and forced to watch her party be murdered and fed to captive Futars. However, she witnesses a Futar using its immobilizing scream, which has "qualities of Voice", against the Honored Matres. Later, Dortujla accompanies Odrade, Tamalane and the acolyte Suipol to meet the Great Honored Matre Dama on Junction, the old Spacing Guild complex above Gammu, as Miles Teg leads a force to attack Gammu. Dortujla and her party are eventually slain by the Honored Matres.

=== Other ===
- Suipol is a Bene Gesserit acolyte in Chapterhouse: Dune. She is chosen to serve and accompany Odrade on her voyage with Tamalane and Dortujla to meet the Great Honored Matre Dama on Junction, as Miles Teg leads a force to attack Gammu. Odrade describes her as a "dark little thing with a round, calm face and manners to match. Not one of our brightest but guaranteed efficient." However, after interaction with Suipol, Odrade realizes that she is much more capable than anticipated and judges her ready to undertake the spice agony and become a full Reverend Mother. Suipol and her party are eventually slain by the Honored Matres. Odrade is upset by the Suipol's death, lamenting the fact that the young acolyte died without being able to share her memories with another sister.
- Sabanda is a young Bene Gesserit Reverend Mother in Chapterhouse: Dune who is captured and interrogated by Great Honored Matre Dama on Junction. Sabanda dies without revealing anything to the Honored Matres, except the fact that Sheeana is alive and, to Sabanda's amusement, the fact that Mother Superior Odrade calls the Honored Matre leader "Spider Queen."

== Introduced in Prelude to Dune (1999–2001) ==
=== Anirul ===
Anirul is a Bene Gesserit of Hidden Rank, wife of the 81st Padishah Emperor Shaddam IV and the mother of his five daughters, the Princesses Irulan, Chalice, Wensicia, Josifa and Rugi. Anirul is referred to only three times in Herbert's 1965 novel Dune, and only once by name, but is a major character in the Prelude to Dune prequel trilogy. In Dune: House Atreides (1999), Anirul is described as having "short bronze-brown hair," and that her "features were long and narrow, giving her a doelike face, but her large eyes had a depth of millennia in them." In the novel, she is the Bene Gesserit Kwisatz Mother, the Reverend Mother chosen every generation to guide the Bene Gesserit breeding program. She calculates that the culmination of the program, the creation of a male superbeing called the Kwisatz Haderach, is imminent. This eventuality is contingent on a daughter of Baron Vladimir Harkonnen being bred with an Atreides male. The resulting daughter would then be bred with another Harkonnen heir, to produce the male Kwisatz Haderach. The Bene Gesserit Margot Fenring arranges for Anirul to marry Shaddam as a means for the Sisterhood to gain influence over the Imperial throne by ensuring that Shaddam will never have a son. During the events of Dune: House Corrino (2001), Anirul is murdered by the Harkonnen Mentat Piter De Vries while trying to save the young Paul Atreides from being kidnapped.

=== Elrood IX ===
Elrood IX of House Corrino is the Padishah Emperor, and father of Shaddam IV. He is mentioned twice in Appendix IV of Dune, where it is noted that he "succumbed to chaumurky" (poison), rumored to have been administered by Count Hasimir Fenring. In Dune: House Atreides, Elrood shows interest in Project Amal, an early attempt by the Bene Tleilax to create synthetic melange and eliminate dependence upon Arrakis. Success would guarantee Elrood total control over spice production. To further this goal, Elrood allows the Tleilaxu to invade and occupy the industrial planet Ix, with the help of Elrood's Sardaukar army, and remake it into a laboratory station for the project. Elrood's other motivation is revenge against Earl Dominic Vernius, the ruler of Ix, whose wife Shando had been one of Elrood's concubines. Shaddam is eager to become emperor, but despite Elrood's advanced age, he shows no signs of ill health. Shaddam finally tasks his longtime friend and minion Fenring to administer Elrood with an undetectable, slow-acting poison. Elrood finally dies, and Shaddam secures his throne by paying off the Spacing Guild with a supply of melange and by arranging his own marriage to a Bene Gesserit.

=== Other ===
- Chaola Fenring is the Bene Gesserit mother of Count Hasimir Fenring. Before the events of the Prelude to Dune trilogy, Chaola (also known as Cirni) is lady-in-waiting to Habla, the fourth wife of Elrood IX, and serves as wet nurse to both her son and Crown Prince Shaddam (later Shaddam IV). It is also hinted that Chaola may secretly be Elrood's sister. Chaola's son Hasimir proves to be a failure for the Bene Gesserit breeding program. In Dune, Paul Atreides notes, "Fenring was one of the might-have-beens, an almost Kwisatz Haderach, crippled by a flaw in the genetic pattern — a eunuch, his talent concentrated into furtiveness and inner seclusion." Nonetheless, the bloodline manipulations of the Bene Gesserit produce a supremely intelligent and perceptive killer in Fenring, who later serves as Emperor Shaddam's chief counselor.
- Harishka is the Bene Gesserit Mother Superior during the Prelude to Dune trilogy, as the Sisterhood nears the fruition of its breeding program.
- Tessia is the Bene Gesserit wife of Prince Rhombur Vernius of Ix in the Prelude to Dune trilogy.
- Hidar Fen Ajidica is a Tleilaxu Master who leads Project Amal, an early attempt by the Bene Tleilax to create synthetic melange in order to eliminate dependence upon Arrakis.
- Duke Paulus Atreides, ruler of the ocean planet Caladan and father of Leto I
- Helena Atreides, wife of Paulus and mother of Leto I
- Victor Atreides, son of Leto and Kailea Vernius of Ix
- Edwina Richese, daughter of Elrood IX
- Tyros Reffa, illegitimate son of Elrood IX
- Pardot Kynes, first Imperial Planetologist on Arrakis and father of Liet-Kynes (mentioned in Dune)
- Faroula, wife of Liet-Kynes, and Chani's mother (mentioned in God Emperor of Dune)
- Abulurd Harkonnen II, half-brother of the Baron; father of Glossu Rabban and Feyd-Rautha (mentioned in Dune)
- Dmitri Harkonnen, father of Baron Vladimir Harkonnen and Abulurd II
- Earl Dominic Vernius, head of House Vernius and ruler of Ix, father of Rhombur and Kailea
- Shando Balut-Vernius, wife of Dominic and mother of Rhombur and Kailea
- Rhombur Vernius, son of Dominic and Shando, later the cyborg ruler of Ix
- Kailea Vernius, daughter of Dominic and Shando, Leto's concubine and mother of Victor
- Cammar Pilru, Ixian ambassador and father of twins C'tair and D'murr
- D'murr Pilru, Spacing Guild Navigator and twin brother of C'tair
- C'tair Pilru, twin brother of D'murr

== Introduced in Legends of Dune (2002–2004) ==
=== Serena Butler ===
Serena Butler is a prominent politician and voice of the human rebellion who becomes the namesake of the Butlerian Jihad against the oppressive rule of the thinking machines in the Legends of Dune prequel trilogy. The daughter of League of Nobles Viceroy Manion Butler and his wife Livia, Serena is romantically involved with Xavier Harkonnen, who leads the military force on the League capital world of Salusa Secundus. The universe is under threat of total domination by the thinking machine empire, which consists of the evermind Omnius, the independent robot Erasmus and their army cymeks, fearsome weaponized machines controlled by disembodied human brains. The thinking machines control many worlds, and continue to conquer more, enslaving or exterminating any humans they encounter.

In Dune: The Butlerian Jihad (2002), Serena is captured by the thinking machines and studied by Erasmus, who seeks to understand humans completely so that the thinking machines can be truly superior. Though his methods of study often entail human vivisection and torture, Erasmus takes a liking to Serena, as does the young Vorian Atreides, a human trustee who serves the thinking machines. Serena realizes she is pregnant with Xavier's child, and later gives birth to a baby boy she names Manion. Eventually finding this distraction inconvenient, Erasmus not only removes Serena's uterus, but kills her young son in front of her and his slaves by dropping the child from a high balcony. This event, broadcast across the universe, incites a formal jihad against the thinking machines. Seeing Serena subsequently attack and destroy a sentinel robot with her bare hands encourages Erasmus' slaves, already groomed for rebellion by slave leader Iblis Ginjo, to rise up. Vorian, witnessing the murder and realizing the lie he lives as a machine trustee, flees with Serena and Ginjo.

In Dune: The Machine Crusade (2003), Ginjo (now Grand Patriarch of the Holy Jihad) and Serena (Priestess of the Jihad) have become the religious leaders of the human rebellion, now known as the Butlerian Jihad, which elevates young Manion to a martyr. Serena is named interim Viceroy upon her father's retirement, but is later relegated to a figurehead by Ginjo as he consolidates his power. The humans begin to tire of war, but Serena and Ginjo know that true peace is not possible, and that the thinking machines must be destroyed. Serena visits Omnius as an emissary of the Jihad under the pretense of negotiating peace, but secretly intends to provoke Omnius into killing her, thereby making her a martyr and reenergizing the Jihad. Although Erasmus stops Omnius from murdering Serena, one of her Seraphim bodyguards, on orders from Ginjo, kills her instead. Ginjo manufactures images of Serena being tortured at length and murdered by the thinking machines, silencing anti-war dissenters and galvanizing the Jihad back into action.

=== Xavier Harkonnen ===
Xavier Harkonnen is the courageous and honorable leader of the military force on the League of Nobles capital world of Salusa Secundus in the Legends of Dune prequel trilogy. In Dune: The Butlerian Jihad, Xavier is romantically involved with Serena Butler until she is presumably killed in an attack by the thinking machines, who seek to conquer the universe and enslave or exterminate all humans. Xavier marries Serena's sister Octa and starts a family. Serena, actually a prisoner of the thinking machines, reappears after Manion, Serena and Xavier's infant son, is martyred by the independent robot Erasmus and sparks a jihad against the machines. In Dune: The Machine Crusade, Serena and the formerly enslaved Iblis Ginjo have become the religious leaders of the human rebellion, with Xavier and Vorian Atreides its two generals. A hero of the Jihad, Xavier achieves many military victories over the machines. When he realizes the extent of Ginjo's corruption, Xavier sacrifices his own life and reputation by steering the ship carrying himself and Ginjo into a sun. His secrets dying with him, Ginjo becomes a martyred saint, and Xavier a traitor to humanity.

=== Vorian Atreides ===
Vorian Atreides is the human son of the Titan Agamemnon, and later the founder of House Atreides, in the Legends of Dune trilogy. In Dune: The Butlerian Jihad, he serves the thinking machines as a human trustee, his primary function being to deliver updates of the thinking machine ruler, the evermind Omnius, to machine-controlled worlds alongside his robot co-pilot, Seurat. Vorian falls in love with Serena Butler, a human captured by the independent robot Erasmus, and is horrified when Erasmus murders her child. Vorian betrays the thinking machines and flees with Serena and the human former slave leader Iblis Ginjo. In Dune: The Machine Crusade, Serena and Ginjo have become the religious leaders of the human rebellion, with Vorian and Xavier Harkonnen as its two generals. A hero of the Jihad, Vorian achieves many military victories over the machines. Having become a close friend to Xavier, Vorian tries to clear Harkonnen's name after Xavier is branded a traitor for assassinating the corrupt Ginjo in a suicide flight into a sun. In Dune: The Battle of Corrin (2004), Vorian commands the final assault on Omnius. Trapped on Corrin, the thinking machines have surrounded the planet with a human shield of slave ships, and Xavier's grandson Abulurd Harkonnen defies Vorian's orders to reactivate their weapons and attack. Abulurd is ultimately relieved of duty and charged with treason and cowardice, for which he is exiled, igniting the Atreides-Harkonnen feud which will last for millennia.

Having previously begun a family on Caladan which would become House Atreides, and fathering children on many worlds, Vorian is settled on the backwater world Kepler in Sisterhood of Dune (2012). His father Agamemnon's life-extension treatments have kept Vorian in his prime for generations, and he foils a group of slavers targeting his village. Vorian meets with Padishah Emperor Salvador Corrino, and is welcomed as a hero of the Jihad. The populace ask that he take the throne from the Corrinos, and though he declines to do so, Salvador and his brother Roderick worry that Vorian's presence may incite a revolution. In exchange for Vorian retreating into deeper exile, Salvador agrees to protect Kepler with Imperial forces. Vorian travels to Arrakis and is confronted by a vengeful Griffin Harkonnen, Abulurd's grandson, whose family ekes out a meager existence but hopes to improve its fortunes. Vorian and Griffin reconcile, but Griffin is later killed by the assassins Hyla and Andros, Vorian's twin half-siblings who are still loyal to the vanquished thinking machines. Vorian sends a message of condolence to Griffin's sister, Valya Harkonnen, who spurns the offer and plans her own revenge. In Mentats of Dune (2014), Vorian is wracked with guilt over Griffin's death, and tries to help his struggling family with a secret infusion of funds to their whaling business on Lankiveil. On Caladan, Vorian's descendant Orry Atreides is murdered on his wedding night by his new bride, who is secretly Tula Harkonnen, Griffin and Valya's younger sister. Vorian and Orry's brother, Willem, confront Valya and a remorseful Tula in Navigators of Dune (2016). Willem spares Tula's life when he learns that she is pregnant with Orry's child. Valya believes Vorian is dead when his ship explodes, but he survives.

=== Iblis Ginjo ===
Iblis Ginjo is a human trustee, the enslaved head of a legion of other slaves, for the thinking machines in Dune: The Butlerian Jihad. Initially loyal to machine leader Omnius and hoping to eventually secure his immortality by becoming a cymek, Ginjo is manipulated into fostering ideas of rebellion as part of a psychological experiment by the independent robot Erasmus. Ginjo begins to see the extent to which the thinking machines do not value human life, and when Erasmus murders the child of human captive Serena Butler, Ginjo spurs the slaves to revolt. He flees with Serena and fellow disillusioned trustee Vorian Atreides. In Dune: The Machine Crusade, Ginjo (now Grand Patriarch of the Holy Jihad) and Serena (Priestess of the Jihad) have become the religious leaders of the human rebellion, now known as the Butlerian Jihad, with Vorian and Xavier Harkonnen as its two generals. Ginjo marries noblewoman Camie Boro, and fathers a daughter, Ticia Cenva with Zufa Cenva, the powerful leader of the telekinetic Sorceresses of Rossak. Serena is named interim Viceroy upon her father's retirement, but is later relegated to a figurehead by Ginjo as he consolidates his power.

The humans begin to tire of war, but Serena and Ginjo know that true peace is not possible, and that the thinking machines must be destroyed. Serena visits Omnius as an emissary of the Jihad under the pretense of negotiating peace, but secretly intends to provoke Omnius into killing her, thereby making her a martyr and reenergizing the Jihad. Although Erasmus stops Omnius from murdering Serena, one of her Seraphim bodyguards, on orders from Ginjo, kills her instead. Ginjo manufactures images of Serena being tortured at length and murdered by the thinking machines, silencing anti-war dissenters and galvanizing the Jihad back into action. As the war against the thinking machines continues, Ginjo becomes more and more corrupt, and focused more on his own power and legacy. He creates the Jipol (Jihad Police) to eliminate his political enemies, and orders organ raids on other League Worlds, casting blame on the thinking machines, to meet the demand for replacement human organs for injured Jihad troops. When Xavier realizes the extent of Ginjo's corruption, he sacrifices his own life and reputation by steering the ship carrying himself and Ginjo into a sun. His secrets dying with him, Ginjo becomes a martyred saint, and Xavier a traitor to humanity.

=== Norma Cenva ===
Norma Cenva is the inventor of foldspace technology, first mentioned in God Emperor of Dune. In the Legends of Dune trilogy, she is the daughter of Zufa Cenva, the powerful leader of the telekinetic Sorceresses of Rossak. Norma is short and unattractive as compared to her tall, beautiful mother, and though her lack of telekinetic abilities disappoints Zufa, Norma is a mathematical genius who is excited to assist the famed Tio Holtzman, discoverer of the Holtzman effect, which makes Holtzman shields possible. These force shields, capable of scrambling the gel-circuitry of thinking machines, are employed in Dune: The Butlerian Jihad to protect entire planets from invasion. However, the machines soon realize that their human-machine hybrid cymeks can slip through the field to destroy the transmitters because they possessed human brains which were unaffected by the scrambler fields. Norma then has the idea to use the field as an offensive weapon, projecting it with portable transmitters to knock out machines and their installations. During this time, she also uses the Holtzman effect to invent suspensors and glowglobes, for which Holtzman takes credit.

In Dune: The Machine Crusade, Holtzman calculates that the field could be modified to prevent penetration from physical projectiles, and Norma agrees, correcting the flaws in his concept but noting that objects could still pass through the shield at a slow enough speed. She also predicts that when hit by a laser, the shield would react violently, resulting in an explosion with the same effect as a nuclear weapon. Norma next studies Holtzman's original field equations to find a way to fold space, soon inventing the theory of space-folding and building a prototype space-folding ship. She is sent away by Holtzman, who is threatened by her genius, shortly before he is killed by an explosive lasgun-shield interaction during a slave revolt. Norma's ship is then used to fold space successfully by Zensunni slaves fleeing the violent rebellion. Norma is later captured and tortured by the Titan Xerxes, which unleashes her latent psychic abilities. She destroys Xerxes and six cymeks, and then uses these powers to rework her own body into a more beautiful, appealing one based on the many women of her ancestry. The next year she and her mother's former lover, industrialist Aurelius Venport, establish a shipyard on Kolhar to produce space-folding ships, which will come to be known as heighliners. Ever uncaring about her own fame, Norma credits the invention to Aurelius as a gift to him. Aurelius puts the space-folding technology and shipyards at the disposal of the Jihad forces. Initially, navigation for foldspace travel is fundamentally inexact, and only about nine out of every ten heighliners arrive at their intended destination safety. Realizing that the spice melange amplifies her psychic and calculative abilities.

In Dune: The Battle of Corrin Norma pioneers the use of massive concentrated doses to employ prescience to safely navigate foldspace. Aurelius and Norma's son, Adrien Venport, establish the Foldspace Shipping Company, and finds the first ten volunteers to undergo, like Norma before them, the process to become Navigators. The Foldspace Shipping Company later becomes the Spacing Guild, monopolizing space commerce, transport, and interplanetary banking.

In the Great Schools of Dune trilogy, the highly evolved Norma periodically advises her great-grandson, Josef Venport, a ruthless businessman and the head of Venport Holdings. Her prescience allows her to envision long-term plans for her Navigators, and she manipulates Josef into evolving the company toward her goals. She is also able to fold space without a Holtzman drive. When Josef assassinates Emperor Salvador Corrino to protect his business interests, Norma intervenes to protect Josef from the wrath of Salvador's brother and successor, Roderick. She eventually negotiates with Roderick: Norma will leave Josef and his research facility unprotected against Roderick's avenging forces in exchange for sparing all current and future Navigators, the creation of an independent Spacing Guild and a guarantee that the flow of spice will continue. He agrees, but Norma saves Josef's life by beginning the process of making him a Navigator, exploiting the loophole she created in her deal with Roderick.

Norma reappears as the Oracle of Time in the sequel novels Hunters of Dune and Sandworms of Dune, which conclude the original series. She warns the Guild Navigators that the "final battle" is upon them, and they must locate the wandering no-ship Ithaca, which is fleeing both the Bene Gesserit and the mysterious observers Daniel and Marty. The ship contains the ultimate Kwisatz Haderach, whom both sides in the great war between humanity and thinking machines want for their victory. Daniel and Marty are in fact reincarnations of thinking machine leaders Omnius and Erasmus, poised to finally conquer humanity and seize control of the universe. In Sandworms of Dune, the Spacing Guild has begun replacing its Navigators with Ixian navigation devices at the prompting of Face Dancer infiltrators with their own plot to take over the universe. Their supply of melange cut off, the obsolete Navigators are dying one by one. As Navigator Edrik pursues alternate sources of the spice, he and the remaining Navigators seek the Oracle's assistance, but she is occupied with finding the Ithaca. As the forces of humanity make a last stand against the thinking machine forces and the ultimate Kwisatz Haderach, Duncan Idaho, faces Omnius, the Oracle gathers the last of the Navigators. The weaponry and navigation of the human ships fail due to Face Dancer manipulations, but the Navigators intervene and are able to hold back the first wave of the machine attack. The Oracle emerges on the capital of the new Synchronized Empire, and takes all traces of Omnius with her to an alternate dimension. This paves the way for Duncan to bridge the gap between the humans and machines and guide the two into a peaceful coexistence.

=== Raquella Berto-Anirul ===
Raquella Berto-Anirul is the founder of the Bene Gesserit, and the granddaughter of Vorian Atreides. In Dune: The Battle of Corrin, Raquella and fellow doctor Mohandas Suk assist the Sorceresses of Rossak with a new outbreak of the plague deployed by the thinking machines to decimate humanity. After being infected herself, Raquella is miraculously cured by "healing water" found on the planet. Paranoid and fearing the doctor might somehow usurp her power as leader of the Sorceresses, Ticia Cenva poisons Raquella with the Rossak drug. Raquella's recovery has unlocked the genetic ability to render the poison harmless using her body chemistry, and she experiences the first iteration of what will ultimately be known as the spice agony. Raquella is awakened to her genetic memories, becoming the first Reverend Mother. Soon she also discovers the new ability to command others with Voice. Raquella conceives a daughter with Suk, but remains on Rossak to continue her work as he pursues his goal to form the greatest medical school ever seen (later known as the Suk School). Ticia dies, and Raquella assumes authority over the Sorceresses and their breeding programs, forming the Sisterhood.

In Sisterhood of Dune, Raquella thwarts Butlerian sympathizers within her own ranks, including her own granddaughter, Dorotea. They correctly suspect that Raquella and her inner circle, including Valya Harkonnen, are using forbidden computers to manage their breeding index, which contains an immense amount of family data from across the Imperium. Dorotea takes the Rossak drug, and survives to become the second Reverend Mother. She learns of the secret computers and alerts Emperor Salvador Corrino, who invades Rossak. Raquella and Valya remove the computers in advance, but a petulant Salvador disbands the Sisterhood School on Rossak. Dorotea establishes an Orthodox Sisterhood sanctioned by Salvador, and Raquella and her followers find refuge on Wallach IX. Valya becomes the third Reverend Mother. In Mentats of Dune, Raquella believes that the only hope for the Sisterhood to survive is for the Wallach IX sisters to reconcile with Dorotea's Orthodox faction. Her health failing, Raquella summons Dorotea and forces her and Valya to put their differences aside and agree to work together for the good of the Sisterhood. Naming them co-leaders, Raquella dies. Valya however, still bitter about Dorotea's betrayal, uses her newly discovered power of Voice to force Dorotea to commit suicide. Valya declares herself to be the sole Mother Superior, and ingratiates herself to the new Emperor, Salvador's brother Roderick.

Raquella is portrayed by Cathy Tyson in the 2024 HBO television series Dune: Prophecy. As the founder and leader of the Sisterhood, she has created a network of influence by placing her Truthsayers, loyal to the Sisterhood, as trusted advisors to the Great Houses. Raquella has also initiated a secret breeding program intended to guide noble bloodlines to cultivate better, more easily controlled leaders. In "The Hidden Hand", a dying Raquella tells young Valya Harkonnen that she must grow, protect and strengthen the Sisterhood, and that Valya "will be the one to see the burning truth, and know." Raquella's granddaughter Dorotea intends to destroy the breeding program as something heretical and impure, so Valya uses the Voice to force Dorotea to kill herself. Thirty years later, Valya is Mother Superior and has grown the Sisterhood in size and power, but her carefully orchestrated plans are thwarted by mysterious Imperial soldier Desmond Hart, who perceives the Sisterhood as a growing threat to the autonomy of the Imperium. Desmond uses a "great power" granted to him by his near-death experience on Arrakis to psychically immolate Imperial Truthsayer Kasha Jinjo, whose burned body reminds Valya of Raquella's dying prediction.

In "Two Wolves", Sister Lila is revealed to be Raquella's great-great-granddaughter. With the Sisterhood desperate for more information about the dangerous prophecy which is now unfolding, Lila undergoes the dangerous Agony ritual to unlock her Other Memory and access Raquella's consciousness. Raquella speaks through her, providing more details about the prophecy that point to Desmond as the key to a coming reckoning. "Sisterhood Above All" depicts Raquella meeting and taking Valya under her wing, eventually sharing with her the secret of the forbidden technology used to maintain her vast DNA database. Recognizing that her life is waning, Raquella intends to put Valya and Dorotea through the Agony to succeed her as leaders of the Sisterhood. Valya at first refuses, and Raquella issues the ultimatum that she take care of her family issues and return as a Reverend Mother, or not at all. Once Valya is sure that her brother Griffin's death has been avenged, she self-administers the Rossak drug and survives.

=== Other ===
- Aurelius Venport is an ambitious industrialist who encourages Norma Cenva's scientific pursuits. He eventually markets her inventions and helps her build a shipyard to produce her space-folding ships, and realizes the potential of the drug melange. Aurelius and Norma marry and have five children, including Adrien.Later, Aurelius and Norma's mother, the Rossak Sorceress leader Zufa Cenva, are intercepted in space by the Titan Hecate. Not knowing that Hecate is assisting the Jihad forces against the thinking machines, Zufa unleashes a telekenetic blast that kills herself, Aurelius and Hecate.
- Rayna Butler is the daughter of Rikov Butler, the governor of the planet Parmentier, and niece of the future Faykan Corrino. Introduced in Dune: The Battle of Corrin, Rayna is 11 years old when the thinking machines release a deadly retrovirus on Parmentier that kills most of the population, including her parents. She is infected and falls into a coma, but awakens days later, miraculously cured, having experienced visions of Serena Butler. Rayna begins destroying all electronics, circuitry and computerized technology, no matter how innocuous, and is soon joined by the Martyrists, a group devoted to the martyred Serena Butler, her infant son Manion, and Iblis Ginjo. They destroy even the desperately needed medical equipment at the Hospital for Incurable Diseases. Led by Rayna, the new Cult of Serena sparks a violent anti-technology crusade across the universe, and the phrase "Thou shall not make a machine in the likeness of a human mind", told to her in a vision, becomes the primary commandment in the Orange Catholic Bible.
- Omnius, the Evermind, an artificial intelligence which is the leader of the thinking machines
- Erasmus, an independent robot who serves Omnius and is fascinated by the human race
- Agamemnon, leader of the Titans, a human brain within a fearsome machine body, and biological father of Vorian Atreides
- Gilbertus Albans, adopted human son of Erasmus, founder of the Order of Mentats
- Dr. Mohandas Suk, a physician instrumental in fighting a catastrophic thinking machine-created plague among humans who later founds the Suk School of medicine
- Zufa Cenva, the powerful leader of the telekinetic Sorceresses of Rossak, and the mother of Norma and Ticia
- Ticia Cenva, daughter of Zufa Cenva and Iblis Ginjo, half-sister of Norma
- Tio Holtzman, scientist who discovered the Holtzman effect, which makes interstellar space travel possible
- Lord Niko Bludd, Holtzman's greedy patron
- Seurat, co-pilot to Vorian Atreides
- Manion Butler Sr., League of Nobles Viceroy and father of Serena Butler
- Livia Butler, wife of Manion Sr. and mother of Serena, abbess of the City of Interspection
- Manion Butler, "Manion the Innocent", Serena's martyred infant son
- Octa Butler, Serena's sister and wife of Xavier Harkonnen
- Wandra Butler, daughter of Xavier Harkonnen and Octa Butler
- Quentin (Vigar) Butler, Wandra's husband
- Faykan Butler, grandson of Xavier Harkonnen and Octa Butler, and son of Wandra and Quentin, who takes the name Faykan Corrino after the Battle of Corrin and founds the Imperial House Corrino
- Rikov Butler, Faykan and Abulurd's brother, governor of Parmentier and primero of the Jihad, father of Rayna
- Abulurd Butler, Faykan and Rikov's brother, who later takes the name Abulurd Harkonnen. He defies Vorian and ignites the Atreides-Harkonnen feud.
- Rayna Butler, Great-granddaughter of Xavier Harkonnen and Octa Butler who founds the Cult of Serena
- Adrien Venport, ruthless son of Aurelius Venport and Norma Cenva who founds the Foldspace Shipping Company, the precursor of the Spacing Guild
- Jool Noret, legendary Ginaz mercenary
- Yorek Thurr, head of the Jipol, Iblis Ginjo's secret police
- Warrick, best friend of Liet-Kynes, killed while attempting the spice agony
- El'him Wormrider, son of Selim
- Selim Wormrider, leader of Zensunni outlaws on Arrakis and the first wormrider
- Estes Atreides, Vorian's son by Leronica Tergiet, twin of Kagin
- Kagin Atreides, Vorian's son by Leronica Tergiet, twin of Estes
- Ajax, a Titan
- Barbarossa, a Titan
- Beowulf a Neo-Cymek, a new generation of human-machine hybrids created by the Titans
- Chirox, reprogrammed robot used as a battle trainer on Ginaz
- Dante, a Titan
- Hecate, a Titan
- Juno, a Titan
- Tamerlane, a Titan
- Tlaloc, a Titan
- Xerxes, a Titan

== Introduced in Hunters of Dune (2006) ==
=== Doria ===
Doria is an ambitious Honored Matre who reluctantly joins the Bene Gesserit as Murbella hopes to unite the opposing factions in Hunters of Dune. Though Doria seeks to learn the impressive skills of the Bene Gesserit, her Honored Matre impulsiveness and resistance to authority are difficult to shake. A chief advisor to Murbella, Doria is one of the few assimilated Honored Matres with access to sensitive Bene Gesserit breeding records. Doria and Bellonda are on opposite sides from the beginning. Hoping to force them to at least respect each other's differences, Murbella makes them partners managing the spice operations on Chapterhouse. Years later, Doria kills Bellonda in a final confrontation. An outraged Murbella forces Doria to share minds with Bellonda, and makes her the sole Spice Operations Director. Six years later, driven to the brink of insanity by Bellonda's incessant chatter within her mind, Doria is devoured by a sandworm.

=== Hellica ===
Hellica is the self-declared Matre Superior of the largest renegade Honored Matre force, based on the conquered planet Tleilax in the former capital Bandalong. In Hunters of Dune, Hellica forces captive Lost Tleilaxu Uxtal to employ the secret of the Tleilaxu axlotl tanks to produce increased quantities of the orange spice substitute used by the Honored Matres. When Guild Navigator Edrik seeks Uxtal's knowledge of producing melange in the tanks, Hellica's price for his expertise is Edrik's help transporting a certain cargo. He agrees, delivering by heighliner the Obliterators that destroy the planet Richese, where the Bene Gesserit are mass-producing weapons and armed battleships. Later, Hellica attempts an Obliterator attack on Chapterhouse itself, but the plan fails. Murbella's forces conquer Tleilax, and Hellica is killed, but Murbella realizes that the Matre Superior and some of her elite guard had actually been Face Dancer duplicates.

=== Other ===
- Rinya is the eldest daughter of Murbella and Duncan Idaho, born a few minutes before her twin sister Janess. In Hunters of Dune, Rinya and Janess are prodigies: ambitious, impatient, and unquestionably talented, but Janess possesses just a hint more caution. Janess is obsessed with learning more about her father Duncan, and she often quotes his philosophical works. Rinya always has to be first for everything, and she demands to be allowed to undergo the spice agony, wanting to become a Reverend Mother at the age of 14, just like Sheeana had done. Though Janess tries to stop the ritual, Rinya insists, and dies in the ordeal.
- Janess Idaho is the second daughter of Murbella and Duncan Idaho, born a few minutes after her twin sister Rinya. In Hunters of Dune, Janess and Rinya are prodigies: ambitious, impatient, and unquestionably talented, but Janess possesses just a hint more caution. Janess is obsessed with learning more about her father Duncan, and she often quotes his philosophical works. Rinya always has to be first for everything, and she demands to be allowed to undergo the spice agony, wanting to become a Reverend Mother at the age of 14, just like Sheeana had done. Though Janess tries to stop the ritual, Rinya insists, and dies in the ordeal. Janess later undergoes the agony herself at age 17, and is successful. Ranked as a lieutenant in the forces of the combined Bene Gesserit/Honored Matre New Sisterhood, her first military assignment is to exterminate a renegade Honored Matre group who control a portion of the planet Gammu. Janess is later promoted to Regimental Commandant, and adopts her father's last name.
- Iriel is a Bene Gesserit tasked to cultivate the Cult of Sheeana on Gammu. In Hunters of Dune, she discovers the Honored Matre plan to send Obliterators on a Spacing Guild heighliner to destroy Chapterhouse. She and some of her followers barely escape Gammu with their lives, but manage to reach Chapterhouse and warn Murbella in time. Soon after, Iriel is killed in the Bene Gesserit takeover of Gammu.
- Corysta is a Bene Gesserit Reverend Mother banished to the aquatic planet Buzzell to work in the operation harvesting valuable soostones. In Hunters of Dune, Murbella's forces retake Buzzell from the conquering Honored Matres. Murbella shares minds with Corysta, learning all she can about the situation on Buzzell but also experiencing Corysta's past. She recognizes Corysta's value and loyalty and puts her in charge of the soostone operation. Corysta manages to improve the efficiency and output of the operation, which is the Sisterhood's only source of revenue besides melange, and is essential to their plan to amass arms for a final battle with the Unknown Enemy. Corysta's past is explored in the 2006 Brian Herbert/Kevin J. Anderson short story "Dune: Sea Child", in which Corysta is banished to Buzzell because she resists handing over to the Sisterhood the baby they had tasked her to conceive. The Honored Matres later conquer the planet, enslaving the Bene Gesserit there. Corysta nurtures a foundling Phibian until it, too, is taken from her by the Honored Matres when she refuses to tell them the secret location of Chapterhouse.
- Khrone is an enhanced, autonomous Face Dancer who appears to serve Daniel and Marty, but has his own agenda for domination of the universe.
- Uxtal is a second-rank Lost Tleilaxu sent to Bandalong by Khrone in Hunters of Dune. Uxtal is tasked to pacify Honored Matre leader Hellica by producing the orange adrenaline-enhancing drug used by the Honored Matres with axlotl technology. Khrone, however, has his own agenda for domination of the universe, and has Uxtal producing gholas for him as well.
- Elder Burah is the leader of the Lost Tleilaxu who is ultimately killed and replaced by one of Khrone's Face Dancers
- Edrik is a Spacing Guild Navigator who seeks an alternate melange supply for his Navigators as the Guild begins replacing them with Ixian navigation machines.

== Introduced in Great Schools of Dune (2012–2016) ==
=== Valya Harkonnen ===
Valya Harkonnen and her brother Griffin are the newest generation of a once-mighty family who were brought to ruin, and exiled to the ice planet Lankiveil. Their ambition is to both reclaim their family's rightful place, and avenge themselves on the Atreides, who caused their downfall. In the Great Schools of Dune series, Valya plots to rise within, and ultimately take control of, the fledgling Bene Gesserit, while galvanizing her siblings to help her visit Harkonnen vengeance on the bloodline of Vorian Atreides.

Emily Watson portrays Valya in the 2024 HBO series Dune: Prophecy, and Jessica Barden plays a younger version of the character in flashbacks.

=== Griffin Harkonnen ===
Griffin Harkonnen is a young nobleman hoping to restore his family's fortunes through service to the Landsraad. In Sisterhood of Dune (2012), his sister Valya learns that the man to blame for the downfall of the Harkonnens decades before, Vorian Atreides, has been made seemingly immortal by the thinking machines and is still alive. Bent on revenge, Griffin tracks Vorian to the desert planet Arrakis. Vorian saves Griffin from a giant sandworm, and Griffin subsequently defeats Vorian in a duel, but spares his life. Though they come to an understanding to end the Atreides-Harkonnen feud, Griffin is executed by Vorian's sister Hyla, an assassin loyal to the vanquished thinking machines. Vorian returns Griffin's body to Lankiveil with a letter of condolence, and Valya refuses to believe he did not kill her brother himself.

Earl Cave portrays Griffin in the 2024 HBO series Dune: Prophecy. In the episode "Sisterhood Above All", Griffin shares Valya's desire to regain their family's status, and seeks to advance in the Landsraad. He is later killed, and though Valya curses that he was murdered by Vorian Atreides, the elder Harkonnens blame Valya.

=== Dorotea ===
Dorotea is Valya Harkonnen's nemesis and the leader of an anti-technology faction within the Sisterhood. In Sisterhood of Dune, Valya is a trusted aide to Mother Superior Raquella Berto-Anirul, who has shared with Valya the secret that she has flouted the Butlerian prohibitions on thinking machines by using computers to maintain the extensive records of the Sisterhood's breeding program. Dorotea, a Butlerian sympathizer and Raquella's granddaughter, discovers the existence of the computers and reports it to Emperor Salvador Corrino. Valya helps Raquella remove them in advance of the Emperor's invasion, but a petulant Salvador disbands the Sisterhood School on Rossak. Dorotea returns to the capital world of Salusa Secundus with the Emperor as his Truthsayer, and forms an orthodox faction of sisters. In Mentats of Dune (2014), Valya retrieves the hidden computers from Rossak and hopes to succeed Raquella as Mother Superior. Nearing the end of her life, Raquella believes that the only hope for the Sisterhood to survive is for the Wallach IX sisters to reconcile with Dorotea's faction. She forces Valya and Dorotea to put their differences aside and agree to work together for the good of the Sisterhood. Naming them co-leaders, Raquella dies. Valya however, still bitter about Dorotea's betrayal, has recently mastered the Voice, and uses it to force Dorotea to commit suicide.

Dorotea is portrayed by Camilla Beeput in the 2024 HBO television series Dune: Prophecy. She is young Valya Harkonnen's rival in the Sisterhood, and the granddaughter and heir apparent of Mother Superior Raquella. Dorotea is described as "pious and determined to return the Sisterhood to what she believes are its core values." In "The Hidden Hand", Dorotea and Valya are at a dying Raquella's bedside to hear her final words, urging them to "use every tool" to grow, protect and strengthen the Sisterhood after her death. Valya urges the gathered Sisters to carry on Raquella's legacy by expanding their reach and influence, and by pushing the boundaries of their abilities. Dorotea, however, preaches humility, and indirect power. Raquella has devised a secret breeding program, intended to guide noble bloodlines to cultivate better, more easily controlled leaders. With Raquella dead, Dorotea rushes to destroy it, believing it to be sinful. Valya uses the Voice to stop her, and when Dorotea refuses to bend to Valya's will, she commands Dorotea to commit suicide.

In "Two Wolves", Sister Lila is revealed to be Dorotea's granddaughter. With the Sisterhood desperate for more information about the dangerous prophecy which is now unfolding, Lila undergoes the dangerous Agony ritual to unlock her Other Memory and access Raquella's consciousness. Raquella speaks through her, but then the vengeful persona of Dorotea overwhelms Lila, who appears to die. "Sisterhood Above All" depicts Dorotea looking on as Raquella meets and takes Valya under her wing. Recognizing that her life is waning, Raquella intends to put Valya and Dorotea through the Agony to succeed her as leaders of the Sisterhood. Valya at first refuses, while Dorotea accepts and survives the ordeal.

=== Tula Harkonnen ===
Tula Harkonnen is the youngest Harkonnen sibling, and has been groomed to share Valya and Griffin's hatred for the Atreides, and desire for revenge against them. In Mentats of Dune, she has joined the Sisterhood, and dutifully follows Valya's instructions to marry young Orry Atreides, and murder him on their wedding night. Tula is overcome with guilt over Orry in Navigators of Dune (2016), and Orry's vengeful brother, Willem Atreides, spares her life when she reveals that she is pregnant with Orry's child.

Olivia Williams portrays Tula in the 2024 HBO series Dune: Prophecy, and Emma Canning plays a younger version of the character in flashbacks.

=== Other ===
- Salvador Corrino, Padishah Emperor and brother to Roderick and Anna
- Roderick Corrino, Emperor Salvador's brother and trusted advisor
- Anna Corrino, the flighty younger sister of Salvador and Roderick
- Manford Torondo, the popular leader of the anti-technology Butlerian movement
- Anari Idaho, a Ginaz Swordmaster in the service of Manford Torondo
- Josef Venport, an unscrupulous businessman who holds a near-monopoly on space travel, and is the great-grandson of Norma Cenva
- Cioba Venport, Josef's wife and advisor
- Tabrina Péle, Salvador's wife, the Empress
- Haditha, Roderick's wife and the mother of his four children
- Nantha, Roderick and Haditha's eldest daughter, accidentally killed by a Butlerian mob
- Javicco Corrino, Roderick's son and heir
- Tikya, Roderick and Haditha's daughter
- Wissoma, Roderick and Haditha's daughter
- Ori Zhoma, a former Rossak Sister and the new director of the Suk Institute
- Hyla and Andros, adult twin children of the Titan Agamemnon, brought out of stasis by the Butlerians
- Willem Atreides, a direct descendant of Vorian Atreides on the planet Caladan
- Orry Atreides, Willem's brother who falls victim to Tula Harkonnen. He is portrayed by Milo Callaghan in the 2024 HBO series Dune: Prophecy, in the episode "Sisterhood Above All".
- Danvis Harkonnen, the younger brother of Griffin and Valya

== See also ==
- List of Dune: Prophecy characters
