= List of games based on Dune =

A number of games have been published based on the Dune universe created by Frank Herbert.

== Card games ==
- Dune (1997): Collectible card game produced by Five Rings Publishing Group/Last Unicorn Games and later Wizards of the Coast. Each player leads a planetary house, "battling, conniving, and bribing its way to greatness ... players bid for powerful characters, search for the life-prolonging spice melange, avoid sandworms, engage in interstellar commerce, and, naturally, try to kill each other".

== Board games ==
- Dune (1979/2019): Avalon Hill/Gale Force Nine
- Dune (1984): Parker Brothers
- Dune: Imperium (2020): Dire Wolf
- Dune: House Secrets (2021); Portal Games
- Arrakis: Dawn of the Fremen (2022); Gale Force Nine
- Dune: Imperium - Uprising (2023): Dire Wolf
- Dune: War for Arrakis (2024): CMON

== Role-playing games ==
- Dune: Chronicles of the Imperium (2000): Last Unicorn Games. Delayed by legal issues and then a corporate buyout of Last Unicorn by Wizards of the Coast, a "Limited Edition" run of 3000 copies of a core rule-book was initially published, pending Wizards of the Coast's conversion of the game to its d20 role-playing game system and a subsequent wider release. The game was later discontinued, but was eventually published by Wizards of the Coast after the acquisition. Val Mayerik did interior art for the game.
- Dune: A Dream Of Rain (2004): Evil Twin Games; unlicensed fan-made game, based on the d20 System.
- Dune: Adventures in the Imperium (2021): Modiphius Entertainment. Its release coincided with the 2021 Dune film.

== Video games ==
There have been seven licensed Dune-related video games released.

=== Dune (1992) ===
1992's Dune from Cryo Interactive/Virgin Interactive blends adventure with strategy. Loosely following the story of the 1965 Frank Herbert novel Dune and using many visual elements from the 1984 film of the same name by David Lynch, the game casts the player as Paul Atreides, with the ultimate goal of driving the Harkonnens from the planet Dune and taking control of its valuable export, the spice. Key to success is the management of spice mining, military forces, and ecology as the player amasses allies and skills. One aspect of the game allows the player to terraform Arrakis from a desert into a fertile and green planet, at the cost of sandworm habitat and reduced melange spice production.

=== Dune II (1992) ===
Dune II: The Building of a Dynasty, later retitled Dune II: Battle for Arrakis for the European release and the Mega Drive/Genesis port, was released in December 1992 from Westwood Studios/Virgin Interactive. Often considered to be the first "mainstream modern real-time strategy game", Dune II established many conventions of the genre. Only loosely connected to the plot of the novels or films, the game pits three interplanetary houses — the Atreides, the Harkonnens, and the Ordos — against each other for control of the planet Arrakis and its valuable spice, all while fending off the destructive natural forces of the harsh desert planet itself.

=== Dune 2000 (1998) ===
Dune 2000, a 1998 remake of Dune II from Intelligent Games/Westwood Studios/Virgin Interactive, added improved graphics and live-action cutscenes. Though gameplay is similar to its predecessor, Dune 2000 features an enhanced storyline and functionality.

=== Emperor: Battle for Dune (2001) ===
Emperor: Battle for Dune (Intelligent Games/Westwood Studios/Electronic Arts) was released on June 12, 2001. A sequel to Dune 2000, the real-time strategy game features 3D graphics and live-action cutscenes, and casts players as Atreides, Harkonnens, or Ordos.

=== Frank Herbert's Dune (2001) ===
Released in 2001 by Cryo Interactive/DreamCatcher Interactive, Frank Herbert's Dune is a 3D video game based on the 2000 Sci Fi Channel miniseries of the same name. As Paul Muad'Dib Atreides, the player must become leader of the Fremen, seize control of Dune, and defeat the evil Baron Harkonnen. The game was not a commercial or critical success, and Cryo subsequently filed for bankruptcy in July 2002.

=== Dune Generations (2001, cancelled) ===
Dune Generations logo

In 2001, Cryonetworks disclosed information about Dune Generations, an online, 3D real-time strategy game set in the Dune universe. An official website for the upcoming game featured concept images, a brief background story and description of the persistent gameworld, and a list of frequently asked questions. The game would be constructed using Cryo's own online multimedia development framework SCOL.

Within "the infrastructure of a permanent and massive multiplayer world that exists online", Dune Generations would let players assume control of a dynasty in the Dune universe, with the goal of first mastering the natural resources of their own homeworlds and ultimately rising in power and influence through conflicts and alliances with other player dynasties. Each of the three available dynasty types - traders, soldiers, or mercenaries - would provide a different playing experience, all with the long-term goal of gaining control of Arrakis and its valuable spice.

A preview video trailer was released in November 2001. The game was still in the alpha testing stage in February 2002, and the project was ultimately halted after Cryo filed for bankruptcy in July.

=== Dune: Ornithopter Assault (2002, cancelled) ===
Dune: Ornithopter Assault was developed by Hungarian studio Soft Brigade 2 for the Game Boy Advance, but was cancelled in 2002. The game was to be a 3D air-to-ground shooter featuring 20 missions, five modes, and multiplayer Link Cable connectivity. Without the license, the game was eventually released as Elland: The Crystal Wars on PC.

=== Dune: Spice Wars (2022) ===
Dune: Spice Wars was released on Steam in Early Access by French development studio Shiro Games on April 26, 2022, before being fully released on September 14, 2023. The game is inspired by Dune and Dune 2 with a strong influence from the books rather than the films. It is a real-time strategy game with 4X elements.

=== Dune: Awakening (2025) ===
Dune: Awakening is an open world action survival massively multiplayer online game set on the planet Arrakis. It was announced by its publisher and developer Funcom on Gamescom Opening Night Live 2022; The first trailer was released on August 23, 2022. It was released on June 10, 2025, on Steam and PC Xbox/Microsoft Store. Players who pre-order the Deluxe or Ultimate Edition gained early access starting June 5, 2025. Ports for PlayStation 5 and Xbox Series X/S released on September 22, 2026.

== Online games ==
There have also been many Dune-based MUDs (multi-user dimension) and browser-based online games, created and run by fans.

=== Dune text room-based MMORPG ===
Dune MUD is an unlicensed, online multiplayer game, a MUD active since 1992.

DuneMUSH was an unlicensed, online multiplayer game, a MUSH active in the early 1990s.

Dune II was an unlicensed, online multiplayer MUSH active in the early 1990s.

=== Behind the Dune ===
Behind the Dune is a pornographic, unlicensed, online flash single player game first released in 2016. The game is based on Dune (1992) by Cryo Interactive.
