= Frank Herbert's Dune (video game) =

- Developer: Widescreen Games
- Publishers: EU: Cryo Interactive; NA: DreamCatcher Interactive
- Producer: Olivier Masclef
- Designer: Sylvain Blanchot
- Programmers: Jérôme Berthier; Sylvain Paris
- Artists: Dominique Peyronnet; Robert Foriel
- Series: Dune
- Engine: RenderWare
- Platforms: Microsoft Windows; PlayStation 2
- Release: EU: November 14, 2001; NA: November 25, 2001 (PC)
- Genre: Action-adventure
- Mode: Single-player

Frank Herbert's Dune is a 2001 action-adventure video game based on the 2000 SciFi Channel miniseries of the same name. The game was not a commercial or critical success, and was one of the last games by Cryo Interactive, which went bankrupt shortly after the game's failure.

== Production ==
By the time the game was made, Cryo had already started to be in financial debt. The game turned out to be a costly flop, and the studio was unable to find creditors to keep operations running. The PlayStation 2 version was released only in Europe.

== Plot ==
As Paul, the son of the Duke Atreides's concubine and heir to the throne, the player must earn the trust and respect from the natives of the desert planet Dune, the Fremen, to ultimately become their prophesied messiah and free them from the desolate conditions of the planet. He also needs to overcome the evil Baron Harkonnen who slaughtered the Atreides family with covert backup from the Emperor.

The story behind each mission is accurate to the novels, though taking place during the two-year span in the 1965 novel Dune when Paul gains the trust of the Fremen.

== Critical reception ==
Reception

Aggregate scores
Aggregator	Score
GameRankings	51%
Metacritic	48/100

Review scores
Publication	Score
Computer Games Magazine	1/5
EP Daily	7.5/10
Jeuxvideo.com	11/20

Dune was a finalist for The Electric Playground's 2001 "Best Adventure Game for PC" award, but lost the prize to Myst III: Exile.
