= Harkonnen =

Harkonnen may refer to:

== Dune franchise ==
- Dune: House Harkonnen, the second book in the Prelude to Dune series, written by Brian Herbert and Kevin J. Anderson
- Baron Vladimir Harkonnen, a fictional villain in the Dune series of novels and films
- Abulurd Harkonnen
- Danvis Harkonnen
- Feyd-Rautha Harkonnen
- Tula Harkonnen
- Valya Harkonnen
- Xavier Harkonnen

== Other ==
- Harkonnen Chair, a series of chair designs by H. R. Giger

== See also ==
- Härkönen
