= Dune: Awakening =

2025 video game developed by Funcom

- Developer: Funcom (Note: Additional development by NUKKLEAR)
- Publishers: Funcom; Spike Chunsoft (Japan)
- Directors: Joel Bylos; Viljar Sommerbakk
- Producer: Nils Ryborg
- Composer: Knut Avenstroup Haugen
- Series: Dune
- Engine: Unreal Engine 5
- Platforms: Windows; PlayStation 5; Xbox Series X/S
- Release: Windows; June 10, 2025 (Note: The Deluxe and Ultimate Editions were released on 5 June 2025, while the Standard Edition was released on 10 June.); PS5, Xbox Series X/S; September 22, 2026
- Genre: Survival
- Modes: Single-player, multiplayer

Dune: Awakening is a survival game developed and published by Funcom. A multiplayer game, it was released for Windows on June 10, 2025, with early access on June 5. Versions for PlayStation 5 and Xbox Series X/S were released on September 22, 2026, along with the addition of a single-player mode.

== Gameplay ==
Dune: Awakening is a survival game. The player creates their own playable avatar, customizing their appearance and selecting their background. They can choose a mentor, who will determine the player's starting ability. For instance, a Bene Gesserit mentor will teach the player character to use "the Voice" to taunt their opponents. Players must manage their character's thirst level and maintain their stillsuits. Arrakis is filled with environmental dangers, such as frequent sandstorms and quicksand. The player character may suffer from a heat stroke if they explore during day time, and encounter hostile Sardaukar patrols at night. Players need to scavenge for resources, which can be used to craft items and build a shelter. Players must compete against each other to harvest and transport spice, a psychedelic drug that is seen as the most essential and valuable commodity in the Dune universe. Sandworms are a constant threat, and players must avoid making loud sounds while moving to avoid drawing their attention. While players can use technology such as thumpers to attract a sandworm and use it to their advantage, they cannot be summoned at will. While players normally will not lose any of their progress when they are defeated, every item and vehicle devoured by a sandworm will be lost forever. As players progress, they will unlock skills, weapons, and gadgets used for combat and traversal. In addition to farming and selling spice, players will become addicted to it, unlocking spice-related powers.

Dune: Awakening is a massively multiplayer game, divided into four phases: Survive, Protect, Expand and Control, and sees the player character advancing from an everyman to the leader of a guild. After completing the starting area, players can access the Overland, where they can pilot an ornithopter from a top-down perspective to reach other locations in a game. Players can join either House Atreides or House Harkonnen, and access faction-specific quests and talk to other non-playable characters. Players can access the Deep Deserts, a primarily player-versus-player environment that can accommodate hundreds of players. This location is ravaged by weekly Coriolis storms, meaning that new locations of interest and modifications to the map will show up every week following the game's launch. Players may explore underground ecology labs, the game's dungeons, alone or with other players. Eventually, players will reach the endgame, in which guilds can use their influence at the Landsraad to make choices that can affect the state of the game's world.

== Plot ==
The opening cinematic is narrated by Paul Atreides, in which he reveals a vision of an alternate timeline in which he is never born; Lady Jessica instead gives birth to a daughter, Ariste, as commanded by the Bene Gesserit. For her loyalty, Jessica is trained as a Truthsayer and uncovers the treachery of Dr. Wellington Yueh, preventing the events of the original novel. House Atreides survives with Duke Leto Atreides's leadership, and becomes engulfed in a protracted "War of Assassins" with House Harkonnen on Arrakis, while the Fremen have mysteriously disappeared after a purge by the Sardaukar, the personal army of Padishah Emperor Shaddam IV.

The player character assumes control of an undercover agent working for the Bene Gesserit, who must find the Fremen and "wake the Sleeper".

== Development ==
Dune: Awakening was developed by Funcom. German-based studio NUKKLEAR served as the game's co-developer and assisted the studio in creating Awakening's vehicular gameplay. In February 2019, Funcom announced that it had signed a partnership with Legendary Entertainment to create three games based on the Dune franchise in six years, with one of which being an open-world multiplayer game. The game is developed using Unreal Engine 5. Dune: Awakening was officially announced in August 2022, and was released for Windows on June 10, 2025. Players that purchases the Deluxe or Ultimate Edition were able to play the game on June 5, five days ahead of its full release..

=== Downloadable content ===
The game features periodic free content update Chapters which advance the main story and character journey, and simultaneous optional paid downloadable content (DLC). The Deluxe and Ultimate game editions include access to the Season Pass of the first 4 paid DLCs.

The first content update, Chapter 2 and DLC titled The Lost Harvest was released on September 9, 2025. Chapter 2 expands the story of the player's origins, adds new cosmetic content and Quality of life features. The Lost Harvest DLC follows a stand-alone story of a crashed Spice Harvester and unlocks a Dicycle ground vehicle, the Treadwheel, and Dune Man building pieces.

== Reception ==
Dune: Awakening received "generally favorable" reviews from critics for the PC version, according to review aggregator website Metacritic with a score of 78 based on 65 reviews. OpenCritic determined that 79% of critics recommended the game.

The game reached more than 140,000 concurrent players on Steam on launch day. It sold a million copies within two weeks.

=== Awards ===
Year	Award	Category	Result	Ref.
2024	Gamescom Awards	Visuals	Nominated	
2024	Gamescom Awards	Audio	Nominated	
2024	Gamescom Awards	Most Epic	Nominated	
2024	Gamescom Awards	Best PC Game	Nominated	
2025	Golden Joystick Awards	PC Game of the Year	Nominated	
2025	16th Hollywood Music in Media Awards	Score – Video (Console & PC)	Nominated	
2025	16th Hollywood Music in Media Awards	Song – Video (Console & PC)	Nominated	
2026	22nd British Academy Games Awards	Multiplayer	Nominated	
