= Butlerian Jihad (disambiguation) =

Butlerian Jihad may refer to:

- The Butlerian Jihad, a fictional historical event introduced in Frank Herbert's Dune novels
- Dune: The Butlerian Jihad (2002), the first novel in the Legends of Dune prequel trilogy, which explores the event
