= Sisterhood of Dune =

Novel by Brian Herbert and Kevin J. Anderson

- First edition cover
- Authors: Brian Herbert; Kevin J. Anderson
- Audio read by: Scott Brick
- Language: English
- Series: Great Schools of Dune
- Genre: Science fiction
- Publisher: Tor Books
- Publication date: January 3, 2012
- Publication place: United States
- Media type: Print (hardcover & paperback)
- Pages: 496
- ISBN: 978-0765322739
- Followed by: Mentats of Dune

Sisterhood of Dune is a 2012 science fiction novel by Brian Herbert and Kevin J. Anderson, set in the Dune universe created by Frank Herbert. It is the first book in their Great Schools of Dune prequel trilogy, which itself is a sequel to their Legends of Dune trilogy. The book is set eighty years after the events of 2004's Dune: The Battle of Corrin, in which the human military finally defeat the thinking machine armies of Omnius. Now, the fledgling Bene Gesserit, Mentat and Suk Schools, as well as the Spacing Guild, are threatened by the independent anti-technology forces gaining power in the aftermath of the Butlerian Jihad. The Great Schools of Dune trilogy, first mentioned by Anderson in a 2010 blog post, chronicle the early years of these organizations, which figure prominently in the original Dune novels.

Sisterhood of Dune is the inspiration for the 2024 television series Dune: Prophecy, serving as a prequel to the films Dune (2021) and Dune: Part Two (2024).

== Plot ==
By the time of the novel, the Butler family, using the regal surname of "Corrino", has consolidated a tenuous hold on the human-occupied universe. The head of the Corrino family, Emperor Salvador, lives in splendor on the planet Salusa Secundus with his brother and trusted advisor, Roderick, but their control of the Imperium is threatened by Manford Torondo, popular leader of the anti-technology Butlerian movement. The demagogue Torondo, deprived of both legs in a bomb blast decades previously, leads Swordmaster Anari Idaho and millions of people across the Imperium to cleanse humanity of its reliance on convenient technologies, often exploiting religious paranoia to advance his agendas. In opposition to the popular movement is the unscrupulous businessman Josef Venport, who holds a near-monopoly on space travel. Advised by his wife Cioba and great-grandmother Norma Cenva, who discovered the secret to creating space-folding "Navigators", Josef plots against his few remaining competitors and funds a secret group of scientific researchers who hold personal grudges against the Butlerians and are willing to salvage and optimize old cymek technology to satisfy their vendettas with Torondo.

Meanwhile, on the planet Kepler, war hero Vorian Atreides attempts to keep his neighbors free from the threat of slavers. An attempt to obtain Imperial protection for his planet is successful, but Vorian is sent even deeper into exile by Salvador and Roderick, who are concerned that the Jihad hero may, through his celebrity, incite a rebellion against their authority. On the planet Lankiveil, the Harkonnen family ekes out a lean existence, far from the glory enjoyed by their ancestors, after Vorian Atreides disowned the disgraced Abulurd Harkonnen. While the parents have decided to surrender ambition for survival and a humble existence, the two oldest children, Griffin and Valya Harkonnen, seek to rebuild their family fortunes through service to the Landsraad and the Sisterhood on Rossak, respectively.

Vorian's granddaughter Raquella Berto-Anirul, who survived a poisoning that provided her with the memories and mental presences of her female ancestors, leads the Sisterhood. She thwarts Butlerian sympathizers within her own ranks, who correctly suspect that Raquella and her inner circle are using computers to manage their breeding index, which comprises an immense amount of family data from across the Imperium. Raquella is aided in these efforts by Sister Valya Harkonnen, who finds her efforts to rebuild her family's glory impeded when the spoiled Princess Anna Corrino (sister to Emperor Salvador and Roderick) is sent to Rossak. Anna, viewed as an embarrassment by the royal family, is meant to learn important skills with the Sisters, but instead follows her own childish ambitions and takes the Rossak drug, designed to induce the near-death transformation that gave Raquella her abilities. Through the new director of the Suk Institute (and former Rossak Sister) Dr. Ori Zhoma, the Sisterhood also plots against Salvador, who it fears may be the ancestor of a potentially disastrous tyrant.

The Mentat Gilbertus Albans attempts to maintain order in his Mentat school on the planet Lampadas and hide the existence of his old mentor, the robot Erasmus. However, Gilbertus is dragged into the Butlerian movement's anti-technology campaign by the fanaticism of his most vocal students, and the furor of Torondo, who coerces Gilbertus to serve as his special advisor. Gilbertus finds himself forced into a confrontation with his best student and friend, Draigo, who is in the service of Josef Venport's VenHold shipping conglomerate. Meanwhile, on the planet Arrakis, the Free Men of Dune, who have abandoned the easier life of the Arrakeen villages, continue to thrive in the desert, encountering various enemies and allies during the course of their existence.

== Reception ==
Sisterhood of Dune debuted at #23 on The New York Times Hardcover Fiction Best-Seller List. Publishers Weekly called it a "shallow but fun blend of space opera and dynastic soap opera." Library Journal noted the novel's "fully realized characters and intricate plotting".
