= Dune (franchise) =

American science fiction media franchise

- Created by: Frank Herbert
- Original work: Dune (1965) (Note: Itself a combination of the Analog Science Fiction & Fact serials Dune World (1963–64) and The Prophet of Dune (1965).)
- Owner: Herbert Properties

Print publications
- Books: The Illustrated Dune (1978); The Dune Encyclopedia (1984); The Making of Dune (1984); The Dune Storybook (1984); The Road to Dune (2005)
- Novels: Frank Herbert: Dune (1965); Dune Messiah (1969); Children of Dune (1976); God Emperor of Dune (1981); Heretics of Dune (1984); Chapterhouse: Dune (1985); Brian Herbert/Kevin J. Anderson: List of novels
- Short stories: List of short stories
- Comics: List of comics

Films and television
- Films: Dune (1984); Dune (2021); Dune: Part Two (2024); Dune: Part Three (2026)
- Television series: Frank Herbert's Dune (2000); Frank Herbert's Children of Dune (2003); Dune: Prophecy (2024)

Games
- Traditional: Dune (1979); Dune (1984); Dune (1997); Dune: Imperium (2020)
- Role-playing: Dune: Chronicles of the Imperium (2000); Dune: Adventures in the Imperium (2021)
- Video games: Dune (1992); Dune II (1992); Dune 2000 (1998); Emperor: Battle for Dune (2001); Frank Herbert's Dune (2001); Dune: Spice Wars (2022); Dune: Awakening (2025)

Audio
- Soundtracks: Dune (1984); Dune: Spice Opera (1992); Frank Herbert's Dune (2000); Emperor: Battle for Dune (2001); Frank Herbert's Children of Dune (2003); Dune (2021); Dune: Part Two (2024); Dune: Awakening (2025); Dune: Part Three (2026)

Miscellaneous
- Toy: Lego Dune

Official website
- Dunenovels.com

Dune is an American science fiction media franchise that originated with the 1965 novel Dune by Frank Herbert and has continued to add new publications. Dune is frequently described as the best-selling science fiction novel in history. It won the inaugural Nebula Award for Best Novel and the Hugo Award in 1966 and was later adapted into a 1984 film, a 2000 television miniseries, and a two-part film adaptation in 2021 and 2024. Herbert wrote five sequels, the first of which was adapted into a forthcoming film in 2026, and was previously adapted with the second sequel as a 2003 miniseries. Dune has also inspired tabletop games and a series of video games. Since 2009, the names of planets from the Dune novels have been adopted for the real-world nomenclature of plains and other features on Saturn's moon Titan.

Frank Herbert died in 1986. Beginning in 1999, his son Brian Herbert and science fiction author Kevin J. Anderson published several collections of prequel novels, as well as two sequels that complete the original Dune series (Hunters of Dune in 2006 and Sandworms of Dune in 2007), partially based on Frank Herbert's notes discovered a decade after his death. As of 2024, 23 Dune books by Herbert and Anderson have been published.

The political, scientific, and social fictional setting of Herbert's novels and derivative works is known as the Dune universe or Duniverse. Set tens of thousands of years in the future, the saga chronicles an intergalactic human and transhuman civilization that has banned all "thinking machines", including computers, robots, and artificial intelligence. In their place, this civilization—which, for most of the narrative, is organized as a complex technofeudal polity called the Imperium—has developed advanced mental and physical disciplines and technologies that adhere to the ban on computers. The harsh desert planet Arrakis, the only known source of the spice melange, is vital to the Imperium. Humans ingest melange to be able to perform the computations needed for space travel and other advanced tasks.

Due to the similarities between some of Herbert's terms and ideas and actual words and concepts in the Arabic language and the Hebrew language, as well as the series' inspiration from Islamic culture, as well as Kabbalist themes, a Middle Eastern influence in Herbert's works has been widely noted.

== Premise ==
The Dune saga is set over twenty thousand years in humanity's future. Faster-than-light travel has been developed, and humans have colonized a vast number of worlds. However, a great reaction against computers has resulted in a ban on any "thinking machine", with the creation or possession of such punishable by immediate death. Despite this prohibition, humanity continues to develop and advance other branches of technology, including extrasensory perception (ESP) and instruments of war. At the time of the first book's setting, humanity has formed a feudal interstellar empire known as the Imperium, run by several Great Houses that oversee various planets. Of key interest is the planet Arrakis, known to the native population as "Dune". A desert planet with barely any precipitation, it is the only planet where a special life-extending drug, melange (or "the spice"), can be found. In addition to life extension, melange enhances the mental capacity of humans through prescience, allowing the Spacing Guild pilots (mutated by heavy melange use) to navigate folded space and travel the distances between planets; and triggers some of the powers of the Bene Gesserit, a religious group that secretly seeks to control the direction humanity takes. Melange is challenging to acquire due to the harsh environment of Arrakis, and the presence of giant sandworms that are drawn towards any rhythmic sounds on the sands of the desert. Feudal control over the fiefdom Arrakis, its spice production, and the impact on humanity's development become the centerpoints of a millennia-long conflict that develops through the series.

== Plot arc ==
The Dune universe, set in the distant future of humanity, has a history that stretches thousands of years (some 15,000 years in total) and covers considerable changes in political, social, and religious structure as well as technology. Creative works set in the Dune universe can be said to fall into five general time periods:

- Butlerian Jihad
  - Legends of Dune prequel trilogy (2002–2004) by Brian Herbert and Kevin J. Anderson
  - Great Schools of Dune prequel trilogy (2012–2016) by Brian Herbert and Anderson
- Corrino-led Imperium
  - Prelude to Dune prequel trilogy (1999–2001) by Brian Herbert and Anderson
  - Heroes of Dune series (2008–2023) by Brian Herbert and Anderson
  - The Caladan Trilogy (2020–2022) by Brian Herbert and Anderson
- Rise of the Atreides
  - Heroes of Dune series (2008–2023) by Brian Herbert and Anderson
  - Dune (1965) by Frank Herbert
  - Dune Messiah (1969) by Frank Herbert
  - Children of Dune (1976) by Frank Herbert
- Reign and fall of the God Emperor
  - God Emperor of Dune (1981) by Frank Herbert
- Return from the Scattering
  - Heretics of Dune (1984) by Frank Herbert
  - Chapterhouse: Dune (1985) by Frank Herbert
  - Hunters of Dune (2006) by Brian Herbert and Anderson
  - Sandworms of Dune (2007) by Brian Herbert and Anderson

=== Butlerian Jihad ===
As explained in Dune, the Butlerian Jihad is a conflict taking place over 11,000 years in the future (and over 10,000 years before the events of Dune), which results in the total destruction of virtually all forms of "computers, thinking machines, and conscious robots". With the prohibition "Thou shalt not make a machine in the likeness of a human mind," the creation of even the simplest thinking machines is outlawed and made taboo, which has a profound influence on the socio-political and technological development of humanity in the Dune series. Herbert refers to the Jihad several times in the novels, but does not give much detail on how he imagined the causes and nature of the conflict. Critical analysis has often associated the term with Samuel Butler and his 1863 essay "Darwin among the Machines", which advocated the destruction of all advanced machines.

In Herbert's God Emperor of Dune (1981), Leto II Atreides indicates that the Jihad had been a semi-religious social upheaval initiated by humans who felt repulsed by how guided and controlled they had become by machines. This technological reversal leads to the creation of the universal Orange Catholic Bible and the rise of a new feudal pan-galactic empire that lasts for over 10,000 years before Herbert's series begins. Several secret societies also develop, using eugenics programs, intensive mental and physical training, and pharmaceutical enhancements to hone human skills to an astonishing degree. Artificial insemination is also prohibited, as explained in Dune Messiah (1969), when Paul Atreides negotiates with the Reverend Mother Gaius Helen Mohiam, who is appalled by Paul's suggestion that he impregnate his consort in this manner.

Herbert died in 1986, leaving his vision of the events of the Butlerian Jihad unexplored and open to speculation. The Legends of Dune prequel trilogy (2002–2004) by Brian Herbert and Kevin J. Anderson presents the Jihad as a war between humans and the sentient machines they had created, who rise up and nearly destroy humanity. The series explains that humanity had become entirely complacent and dependent upon thinking machines; recognizing this weakness, a group of ambitious, militant humans calling themselves the Titans use this widespread reliance on machine intelligence to seize control of the entire universe. Their reign lasts for a century; eventually they give too much access and power to the AI program Omnius, which usurps control from the Titans themselves. Seeing no value in human life, the thinking machines—now including armies of robot soldiers and other aggressive machines—dominate and enslave nearly all of humanity in the universe for 900 years, until a jihad is ignited. This crusade against the machines lasts for almost a century, with much loss of human life but ultimately ending in human victory.

=== Corrino-led Imperium ===
The golden lion is the symbol of House Corrino.

The ancient Battle of Corrin—occurring 20 years after the end of the Butlerian Jihad—spawns the Padishah Emperors of House Corrino, who rule the known universe for millennia by controlling the Sardaukar, a brutally efficient military force. Ten thousand years later, Imperial power is balanced by the assembly of noble houses called the Landsraad, which enforces the Great Convention's ban on the use of atomics against human targets. Though the power of the Corrinos is unrivaled by any individual House, they are in constant competition with each other for political power and stakes in the omnipresent CHOAM company, a directorship that controls the wealth of the entire Empire. The third primary power in the universe is the Spacing Guild, which monopolizes interstellar travel and banking. Mutated Guild Navigators use the spice drug melange to successfully navigate "folded space" and safely guide enormous heighliner starships from planet to planet instantaneously.

The matriarchal Bene Gesserit possess almost superhuman physical, sensory, and deductive powers developed through years of physical and mental conditioning. While positioning themselves to "serve" humanity, the Bene Gesserit pursue their goal to better the human race by subtly and secretly guiding and manipulating the affairs of others to serve their own purposes. By the time of Dune, they have secured a level of control over the current emperor, Shaddam IV, by marrying him to one of their own who intentionally bears him only daughters. The Bene Gesserit also has a secret, millennia-long selective breeding program to bolster and preserve valuable skills and bloodlines as well as to produce a theoretical superhuman male they call the Kwisatz Haderach. When Dune begins, the Sisterhood is only one generation away from their desired individual, having manipulated the threads of genes and power for thousands of years to produce the required confluence of events. But Lady Jessica, ordered by the Bene Gesserit to produce a daughter who would breed with the appropriate male to make the Kwisatz Haderach, instead bears a son—unintentionally producing the Kwisatz Haderach a generation early.

"Human computers" known as Mentats have been developed and perfected to replace the capacity for logical analysis lost through the prohibition of computers. Through specific training, they learn to enter a heightened mental state in which they can perform complex logical computations that are superior to those of the ancient thinking machines. The Bene Tleilax are amoral merchants who traffic in biological and genetically engineered products such as artificial eyes, "twisted" Mentats, and gholas. Finally, the Ixians produce cutting-edge technology that seemingly complies with (but pushes the boundaries of) the prohibitions against thinking machines. The Ixians are very secretive, not only to protect their valuable hold on the industry but also to hide any methods or inventions that may breach the anti-thinking machine protocols.

Against this backdrop, the Prelude to Dune prequel trilogy (1999–2001) chronicles the return from obscurity of House Atreides, whose role in the Butlerian Jihad is all but forgotten. The Imperial House schemes to gain full control of the Empire through the control of melange, precisely at the time that the Bene Gesserit breeding program is nearing fruition.

=== Rise of the Atreides ===
Atreides green and black banner, in the form of a guidon pennant, as described in the novel

Red hawk symbol of House Atreides as depicted in the 2021 film Dune

As Frank Herbert's Dune (1965) begins, Duke Leto Atreides finds himself in a dangerous position. The 81st Padishah Emperor, Shaddam IV, has put him in control of the desert planet Arrakis, known as Dune, which is the only source of the all-important spice melange. The most valuable commodity in the known universe, the spice not only makes safe and reliable interstellar travel possible, but also prolongs life, protects against disease, and is used by the Bene Gesserit to enhance their abilities. The potential financial gains for House Atreides are mitigated by the fact that mining melange from the desert surface of Arrakis is an expensive and hazardous undertaking, thanks to the treacherous environment and constant threat of giant sandworms that protect the spice. In addition, Leto is aware that Shaddam, feeling threatened by the rising power and influence of the Atreides, has sent him into a trap. Failure to meet or exceed the production volume of his predecessor, the villainous Baron Vladimir Harkonnen, will harm the position of House Atreides in CHOAM, which relies on spice profits. Further, the very presence of the Atreides on Arrakis inflames the long-simmering War of Assassins between House Atreides and House Harkonnen, a feud ignited 10,000 years before when an Atreides had a Harkonnen banished for cowardice after the Butlerian Jihad.

The little-understood native population of Arrakis are the Fremen, long overlooked by the Imperium. Considered backward savages, the Fremen are extremely hardy people and exist in large numbers; their culture is built around the commodity of water, which is extremely scarce on Arrakis. The Fremen await the coming of a prophesied messiah, not suspecting that this prophecy had been planted in their legends by the Missionaria Protectiva, an arm of the Bene Gesserit dedicated to religious manipulation to ease the path of the Sisterhood when necessary. In Dune, the so-called "Arrakis Affair" puts unexpected Kwisatz Haderach Paul Atreides in control of first the Fremen people and then Arrakis itself. Absolute control over the spice supply allows Paul to depose Shaddam and become ruler of the known universe, with Shaddam's eldest daughter Princess Irulan as his wife. With a bloody jihad subsequently unleashed across the universe in Paul's name but out of his control, the Bene Gesserit, Tleilaxu, Spacing Guild, and House Corrino conspire to dethrone him in Dune Messiah (1969). Though the plot fails, the Atreides Empire continues to devolve in Children of Dune (1976) as the religion built around Paul falters, Irulan's sister Wensicia conspires to place her son Farad'n on the throne, and Paul's twin heirs Leto II and Ghanima rise to power.

The Heroes of Dune series (2008–2009) by Brian Herbert and Kevin J. Anderson chronicles the major events that take place between Dune: House Corrino (2001) and Dune: The Duke of Caladan (2020), between Dune (1965) and Dune Messiah (1969), and between Dune Messiah and Children of Dune (1976).

=== Reign and fall of the God Emperor ===
The blue griffin is the symbol of House Harkonnen.

At the time of God Emperor of Dune (1981), Paul's son, the God Emperor Leto II Atreides, has ruled the Empire for 3,500 years from the verdant face of a transformed Arrakis; melange production has ceased. Leto has forced the sandworms into extinction, except for the larval sandtrout with which he had forged a symbiosis, transforming him into a human-sandworm hybrid. Human civilization before his rule had suffered from twin weaknesses: that a single authority could control it and that it was dependent upon melange, found on only one planet in the known universe. Leto's prescient visions had shown that humanity would be threatened by extinction in any number of ways; his solution was to place humanity on his "Golden Path," a plan for humanity's survival. Leto governs as a benevolent tyrant, providing for his people's physical needs, but denying them any spiritual outlets other than his compulsory religion (as well as maintaining a monopoly on spice and thus total control of its use). Personal violence is banned, as is nearly all space travel, creating a pent-up demand for freedom and travel. The Bene Gesserit, Ixians, and Tleilaxu seek ways to regain some of their former power or unseat Leto altogether. Leto also conducts his selective breeding program among the descendants of his twin sister Ghanima, finally arriving at Siona, daughter of Moneo, whose actions are hidden from prescient vision. Leto engineers his own assassination, knowing it will result in rebellion and revolt but also in an explosion in travel and colonization. The death of Leto's body also produces new sandtrout, which will eventually give rise to a population of sandworms and a new cycle of spice production.

=== Return from the Scattering ===
In the aftermath of the fall of the God Emperor, chaos and severe famine in many worlds caused trillions of humans to set off into the freedom of unknown space and spread out across the universe. This diaspora is later called the Scattering and, combined with the invisibility of Atreides descendants to prescient vision, assures that humanity has forever escaped the threat of total extinction. At the time of Heretics of Dune (1984) and Chapterhouse: Dune (1985)—1500 years after Leto's death—the turmoil is settling into a new pattern; the balance of power in the Old Empire, as it is now called, rests among the Ixians, the Bene Gesserit, and the Tleilaxu. The Spacing Guild has been forever weakened by the development of Ixian machines capable of navigation in foldspace, practically replacing Guild Navigators. The Bene Gesserit, through manipulation of the Priesthood of the Divided God, control the sandworms and their planet, now called Rakis, but the Tleilaxu have discovered how to produce melange using their axlotl tanks in quantities that greatly exceed natural melange harvests. This balance of power is shattered by a large influx of people from the Scattering, some fleeing persecution by an as-yet-unknown enemy. Among the returning people, the Bene Gesserit finds its match in a violent and corrupt matriarchal society known as the Honored Matres, who they suspect may be descended from some of their own sent out in the Scattering. As a bitter and bloody war erupts between the orders, it ultimately becomes clear that joining the two organizations into a single New Sisterhood with shared abilities is their best chance to fight the approaching enemy.

The sequels Hunters of Dune (2006) and Sandworms of Dune (2007) by Brian Herbert and Kevin J. Anderson complete the original series and wrap up storylines that began with Heretics of Dune.

== Development and publication ==
=== Original series ===
Herbert's interest in the desert setting of Dune and its challenges is attributed to research he began in 1957 for a never-completed article about a United States Department of Agriculture experiment using poverty grass to stabilize damaging sand dunes, which could "swallow whole cities, lakes, rivers, and highways." Herbert spent the next five years researching, writing, and revising what would eventually become the novel Dune, which was initially serialized in Analog magazine as two shorter works, Dune World (1963) and The Prophet of Dune (1965). The serialized version was expanded and reworked—and rejected by more than 20 publishers—before being published by Chilton Books, a printing house best known for its auto repair manuals, in 1965. Dune won the inaugural Nebula Award for Best Novel in 1966, and the 1966 Hugo Award. The novel has been translated into dozens of languages, and has sold almost 20 million copies. Dune has been regularly cited as one of the world's best-selling science fiction novels.

A sequel, Dune Messiah, followed in 1969. A third novel called Children of Dune was published in 1976, and was later nominated for a Hugo Award. Children of Dune became the first hardcover best-seller ever in the science fiction field. Parts of these two first sequels were written before Dune was completed.

In 1978, Berkley Windhaven published The Illustrated Dune, an edition of Dune with 33 black-and-white sketch drawings and eight full color paintings by John Schoenherr, who had done the cover art for the first printing of Dune and had illustrated the Analog serializations of Dune and Children of Dune. Herbert wrote in 1980 that though he had not spoken to Schoenherr prior to the artist creating the paintings, the author was surprised to find that the artwork appeared exactly as he had imagined its fictional subjects, including sandworms, Baron Harkonnen and the Sardaukar.

In 1981, Herbert released God Emperor of Dune, which was ranked as the #11 hardcover fiction best seller of 1981 by Publishers Weekly. Heretics of Dune, the 1984 New York Times #13 hardcover fiction best seller, was followed in quick succession by Chapterhouse: Dune in 1985. Herbert died on February 11, 1986.

=== Brian Herbert and Kevin J. Anderson ===
Over a decade after Herbert's death, his son Brian Herbert enlisted science fiction author Kevin J. Anderson to coauthor a trilogy of Dune prequel novels that would come to be called the Prelude to Dune series. Using some of Frank Herbert's own notes, the duo wrote Dune: House Atreides (1999), Dune: House Harkonnen (2000), and Dune: House Corrino (2001). The series is set in the years immediately prior to the events of Dune. This was followed with a second prequel trilogy called the Legends of Dune, consisting of Dune: The Butlerian Jihad (2002), Dune: The Machine Crusade (2003), and Dune: The Battle of Corrin (2004). These were set during the Butlerian Jihad, an element of backstory that Frank Herbert had previously established as occurring 10,000 years before the events chronicled in Dune. Herbert's brief description of humanity's "crusade against computers, thinking machines, and conscious robots" was expanded by Brian Herbert and Anderson in this series.

With an outline for the first book of Prelude to Dune series written and a proposal sent to publishers, Brian Herbert had discovered his father's 30-page outline for a sequel to Chapterhouse Dune, which the elder Herbert had dubbed Dune 7. After publishing their six prequel novels, Brian Herbert and Anderson released Hunters of Dune (2006) and Sandworms of Dune (2007), which complete the original series and wrap up storylines that began with Frank Herbert's Heretics of Dune.

The Heroes of Dune series followed, focusing on the time periods between Frank Herbert's original novels. The first book, Paul of Dune, was published in 2008, followed by The Winds of Dune in 2009. The next two installments were to be called The Throne of Dune and Leto of Dune (possibly changing to The Golden Path of Dune), but were postponed due to plans to publish a trilogy, Great Schools of Dune, about "the formation of the Bene Gesserit, the Mentats, the Suk doctors, the Spacing Guild and the Navigators, as well as the solidifying of the Corrino Imperium." Sisterhood of Dune was released in 2012, followed by Mentats of Dune in 2014. In a 2009 interview, Anderson stated that the third and final novel would be titled The Swordmasters of Dune, but by 2014 it had been renamed Navigators of Dune. The novel was published on September 13, 2016. A third Heroes of Dune novel, Princess of Dune, was released on October 3, 2023.

In July 2020, Herbert and Anderson announced a new trilogy of prequel novels called The Caladan Trilogy. The first novel in the series, Dune: The Duke of Caladan, was published in October 2020, and the second, Dune: The Lady of Caladan, was released in September 2021. The third novel, Dune: The Heir of Caladan, was released on November 22, 2022.

=== Short stories ===
In 1985, Frank Herbert wrote an illustrated short work called "The Road to Dune", set sometime between the events of Dune and Dune Messiah. Published in Herbert's short story collection Eye, it takes the form of a guidebook for pilgrims to Arrakis and features images (with descriptions) of some of the devices and characters presented in the novels.

Brian Herbert and Anderson have written eight Dune short stories and four Dune novellas, most of them related to and published around their novels. The eight short stories include "Dune: A Whisper of Caladan Seas" (2001), "Dune: Hunting Harkonnens" (2002), "Dune: Whipping Mek" (2003), "Dune: The Faces of a Martyr" (2004), "Dune: Sea Child" (2006), "Dune: Treasure in the Sand" (2006), "Dune: Wedding Silk" (2008), and "Dune: Red Plague" (2016). These eight short stories were published together in the 2017 collection Tales of Dune: Expanded Edition. The four novellas include "Dune: The Waters of Kanly" (2017), "Dune: Blood of the Sardaukar" (2019), "Dune: The Edge of a Crysknife" (2022), and "Dune: Imperial Court" (2022). The four novellas were published together in the collection Sands of Dune, which released on July 28, 2022.

== By other authors ==
In 1984, Herbert's publisher Putnam released The Dune Encyclopedia. Approved by Herbert but not written by him, this collection of essays by 43 contributors describes in invented detail many aspects of the Dune universe not found in the novels themselves. Herbert's estate later confirmed its non-canonical status after Brian Herbert and Kevin J. Anderson had begun publishing prequel novels that directly contradict The Dune Encyclopedia. The 1984 Dune film spawned The Dune Storybook (September 1984, ISBN 0-399-12949-9), a novelization written by Joan D. Vinge, and The Making of Dune (December 1984, ISBN 0-425-07376-9), a making-of book by Ed Naha.

In May 1992, Ace Books published Songs of Muad'Dib (ISBN 0-441-77427-X), a collection of Dune-related poems written by Frank Herbert and edited by his son Brian. Brian Herbert and Kevin J. Anderson released The Road to Dune on August 11, 2005. The book contains a novelette called Spice Planet (an alternative version of Dune based on an outline by Frank Herbert), a number of the Brian Herbert/Anderson short stories, and letters and unused chapters written by Frank Herbert. In the 1999 gazetteer The Stars and Planets of Frank Herbert's Dune: A Gazetteer (1999), Joseph M. Daniels estimates the distance from Earth in light-years (ly) for many Dune planets, based on the real-life distances of the stars and planetary systems referenced by Frank Herbert when discussing these planets in the glossary of the novel Dune. Though Herbert used the names of actual stars and planetary systems in his work, there is no documentation supporting or disputing the assumption that he was, in fact, referring to these real-life stars or systems.

The Science of Dune (2008) analyzes and deconstructs many of Herbert's concepts and fictional inventions.

== Themes and influences ==
The Dune series is a landmark of soft science fiction. Herbert deliberately suppressed technology in his Dune universe so he could address the politics of humanity, rather than the future of humanity's technology. Dune considers the way humans and their institutions might change over time. Jon Michaud of The New Yorker called the originating novel Dune "an epic of political betrayal, ecological brinkmanship, and messianic deliverance." Director John Harrison, who adapted Dune for Syfy's 2000 miniseries, called the novel a universal and timeless reflection of "the human condition and its moral dilemmas", and said:

A lot of people refer to Dune as science fiction. I never do. I consider it an epic adventure in the classic storytelling tradition, a story of myth and legend not unlike the Morte d'Arthur or any messiah story. It just happens to be set in the future... The story is actually more relevant today than when Herbert wrote it. In the 1960s, there were just these two colossal superpowers duking it out. Today we're living in a more feudal, corporatized world more akin to Herbert's universe of separate families, power centers and business interests, all interrelated and kept together by the one commodity necessary to all.

Novelist Brian Herbert, Frank Herbert's son and biographer, explained that "Frank Herbert drew parallels, used spectacular metaphors, and extrapolated present conditions into world systems that seem entirely alien at first blush. But close examination reveals they aren't so different from systems we know." He wrote that the invaluable drug melange "represents, among other things, the finite resource of oil". Michaud explained, "Imagine a substance with the combined worldwide value of cocaine and petroleum and you will have some idea of the power of melange." Each chapter of Dune begins with an epigraph excerpted from the fictional writings of the character Princess Irulan. In forms such as diary entries, historical commentary, biography, quotations and philosophy, these writings set tone and provide exposition, context, and other details intended by Herbert to enhance understanding of his complex fictional universe and themes.

Michaud wrote in 2013, "With daily reminders of the intensifying effects of global warming, the spectre of a worldwide water shortage, and continued political upheaval in the oil-rich Middle East, it is possible that Dune is even more relevant now than when it was first published." Praising Herbert's "clever authorial decision" to excise robots and computers ("two staples of the genre") from his fictional universe, he suggested that "This de-emphasis on technology throws the focus back on people. It also allows for the presence of a religious mysticism uncommon in science fiction."

=== Environmentalism and ecology ===
The originating novel Dune has been called the "first planetary ecology novel on a grand scale". After the publication of Silent Spring by Rachel Carson in 1962, science fiction writers began treating the subject of ecological change and its consequences. Dune responded in 1965 with its complex descriptions of life on Arrakis, from giant sandworms (for whom water is life-threatening) to smaller, mouse-like life-forms adapted to live with limited water. Dune was followed in its creation of complex and unique ecologies by other science fiction books such as A Door into Ocean (1986) and Red Mars (1992). Environmentalists have pointed out that Dune's popularity as a novel depicting a planet as a complex, almost living, thing, in combination with the first images of Earth from space being published in the same time period, strongly influenced environmental movements such as the establishment of the international Earth Day.

=== Declining empires ===
Lorenzo DiTommaso compared Dune's portrayal of the downfall of a galactic empire to Edward Gibbon's The History of the Decline and Fall of the Roman Empire, which argues that Christianity allied with the profligacy of the Roman elite led to the fall of Ancient Rome. In "History and Historical Effect in Frank Herbert's Dune" (1992), DiTommaso outlines similarities between the two works by highlighting the excesses of Padishah Emperor Shaddam IV on his home planet of Kaitain and of the Baron Vladimir Harkonnen in his palace. The Emperor loses his effectiveness as a ruler through an excess of ceremony and pomp. The hairdressers and attendants he brings with him to Arrakis are even referred to as "parasites". The Baron Harkonnen is similarly corrupt, materially indulgent, and a sexual degenerate. Gibbon's Decline and Fall partly blames the fall of Rome on the rise of Christianity. Gibbon claimed that this exotic import from a conquered province weakened the soldiers of Rome and left it open to attack.

Similarly, the Emperor's Sardaukar fighters are little match for the Fremen of Arrakis because of the Sardaukar's overconfidence and the Fremen's capacity for self-sacrifice. The Fremen put the community before themselves in every instance, while the world outside wallows in luxury at the expense of others. The decline and long peace of the Empire sets the stage for revolution and renewal by genetic mixing of successful and unsuccessful groups through war, a process culminating in the Jihad led by Paul Atreides, described by Herbert as depicting "war as a collective orgasm" (drawing on Norman Walter's 1950 The Sexual Cycle of Human Warfare). These themes reappear in God Emperor of Dune's Scattering and Leto II Atreides's all-female Fish Speaker army.

=== Heroism ===
Brian Herbert wrote that "Dune is a modern-day conglomeration of familiar myths, a tale in which great sandworms guard a precious treasure of melange...[that] resembles the myth described by an unknown English poet in Beowulf, the compelling tale of a fearsome fire dragon who guarded a great treasure hoard in a lair under cliffs."

Paul's rise to superhuman status follows the hero's journey template; after unfortunate circumstances are forced onto him, he suffers a long period of hardship and exile, and finally confronts and defeats the source of evil in his tale. As such, Dune is representative of a general trend beginning in 1960s American science fiction in that it features a character who attains godlike status through scientific means. Frank Herbert said in 1979, "The bottom line of the Dune trilogy is: beware of heroes. Much better [to] rely on your own judgment, and your own mistakes." He wrote in 1985, "Dune was aimed at this whole idea of the infallible leader because my view of history says that mistakes made by a leader (or made in a leader's name) are amplified by the numbers who follow without question."

Juan A. Prieto-Pablos says Herbert achieves a new typology with Paul's superpowers, differentiating the heroes of Dune from earlier heroes such as Superman, van Vogt's Gilbert Gosseyn and Henry Kuttner's telepaths. Unlike previous superheroes who acquire their powers suddenly and accidentally, Paul's are the result of "painful and slow personal progress." And unlike other superheroes of the 1960s—who are the exception among ordinary people in their respective worlds—Herbert's characters grow their powers through "the application of mystical philosophies and techniques." For Herbert, the ordinary person can develop incredible fighting skills (Fremen, Swordmasters of Ginaz and Sardaukar) or mental abilities (Bene Gesserit, Mentats, Spacing Guild Navigators).

=== Islamic and Middle-Eastern influences ===
Due to the similarities between some of Herbert's terms and ideas and actual words and concepts in Arabic, as well as the series' "Islamic undertones" and themes, a Middle Eastern influence on Herbert's works has been noted repeatedly.

As a foreigner who adopts the ways of a desert-dwelling people and then leads them in a military capacity, Paul Atreides's character bears many similarities to the historical T. E. Lawrence, whose 1962 biopic Lawrence of Arabia has also been identified as an influence. Lesley Blanch's novel The Sabres of Paradise (1960) about Muslim resistance to the Russian conquest of the Caucasus, has also been identified as a major influence upon Dune, with its depiction of Imam Shamil, the Caucasian Imamate, and the Islamic culture of the Caucasus inspiring some of the themes, characters, events and terminology of Dune. Multiple proverbs recorded by Blanch's The Sabres as originating from the Caucasus Mountains are included in Dune, such as "polish comes from the city, wisdom from the hills," becoming "polish comes from the cities, wisdom from the desert" for Arrakis.

The environment of the desert planet Arrakis is similar to the Middle East, particularly the Arabian Peninsula and Persian Gulf. The novel also contains references to the petroleum industries in the Arab states of the Persian Gulf. The Fremen people of Arrakis were influenced by the Bedouin tribes of Arabia, and the Mahdi prophecy originates from Islamic eschatology. Inspiration is also adopted from medieval historian ibn Khaldun's cyclical history and his dynastic concept in North Africa, hinted by Herbert's reference to ibn Khaldun's book Kitāb al-ʿIbar "The Book of Lessons" as known among the Fremen.

==== Additional linguistic and historic influences ====
In addition to Arabic, Dune derives words and names from multiple other languages, including Hebrew, Navajo, Latin, Chakobsa, the Nahuatl language of the Aztecs, Greek, Persian, East Indian, Russian, Turkish, Finnish, Dutch and Old English. Herbert created a fictional language, also called Chakobsa, used by the Fremen on Arrakis for rituals and other purposes. Through the inspiration from Lesley Blanch's The Sabres of Paradise, there are also allusions to the Tsarist-era Russian nobility and Cossacks. Herbert stated that bureaucracy that lasted long enough would become a hereditary nobility, and a significant theme behind the aristocratic families in Dune was "aristocratic bureaucracy" which he saw as analogous to the Soviet Union.

=== Religion ===
Brian Herbert called the Dune universe "a spiritual melting pot", noting that his father, Frank Herbert, incorporated elements of a variety of religions, including Buddhism, Sufi mysticism and other Islamic belief systems, Catholicism, Protestantism, Judaism, and Hinduism. He added that Frank Herbert's fictional future in which "religious beliefs have combined into interesting forms" represents the author's solution to eliminating arguments between religions, each of which claim to have "the one and only revelation." Frank Herbert writes that, in the aftermath of the technology-purging Butlerian Jihad, the Bene Gesserit composed the Azhar Book, which "preserves the great secrets of the most ancient faiths". Soon after, an ecumenical council created a syncretic religion defined by the Orange Catholic Bible, which would become the primary orthodox religious text in the universe. Its title suggests a merging of Protestantism (Orange Order) and Catholicism. Herbert writes in the glossary of Dune:

Orange Catholic Bible: the "Accumulated Book," the religious text produced by the Commission of Ecumenical Translators. It contains elements of most ancient religions, including the Maometh Saari, Mahayana Christianity, Zensunni Catholicism and Buddislamic traditions. Its supreme commandment is considered to be: "Thou shalt not disfigure the soul."

Early in his newspaper career, Frank Herbert was introduced to Zen, a school of Mahayana Buddhism, by two Jungian psychologists, Ralph and Irene Slattery, who "gave a crucial boost to his thinking". Zen teachings ultimately had "a profound and continuing influence on [Herbert's] work". Throughout the Dune series and particularly in Dune, Herbert employs concepts and forms borrowed from Zen Buddhism. The Fremen are Zensunni adherents, and many of Herbert's epigraphs are Zen-spirited. In "Dune Genesis", Frank Herbert wrote:

What especially pleases me is to see the interwoven themes, the fuguelike relationships of images that exactly replay the way Dune took shape ... I involved myself with recurrent themes that turn into paradox. The central paradox concerns the human vision of time. What about Paul's gift of prescience—the Presbyterian fixation? For the Delphic Oracle to perform, it must tangle itself in a web of predestination. Yet predestination negates surprises and, in fact, sets up a mathematically enclosed universe whose limits are always inconsistent, always encountering the unprovable. It's like a koan, a Zen mind breaker.

The Bene Gesserit practice "religious engineering" (social engineering), through the Missionaria Protectiva, which spreads contrived myths, prophecies and superstition on primitive worlds so that the Sisterhood may at a much later time exploit embedded belief to advance their universal strategies. Herbert suggests a process of wish-fulfilling recognition of "sacred" texts created by the Bene Gesserit's master plan in a particular person, and transforming events into common belief. In the novels, the Fremen religion on Arrakis has been thus influenced, allowing Paul to embody their prophesied messiah. Paul is agonized by visions of terrible jihad which will destroy the Imperium, but he becomes Paul Muad'Dib, Mahdi of the Fremen, accepting the role imposed by Bene Gesserit. A new religion sweeps Paul to power.

Between the events of Dune and Dune Messiah, the name Muad'Dib becomes a battle cry on the lips of the Fremen army that sweeps across the universe in a jihad in the name of Muad'Dib's religion. The population of the universe sees Muad'Dib as their god, whether they like it or not, and they cannot deny his power religiously. The Fremen culture is irreparably damaged by jihad; the new religion takes shape of rituals that are dependent on Muad'Dib's omnipresence. As Muad'Dib, Paul is the messiah and the Emperor (King of Kings) who gives himself to fate and becomes a martyr to his followers, wanders blinded into the desert to die, later finding emancipation as a heretic of his own church as the Preacher. The regency of Paul's sister Alia and the Qizarate priests continue to promote Muad'Dib's religion to help keep control of the universe, ensuring that others do not oppose them. In his Golden Path, Herbert presents an argument of how to create a healthy society, avoiding despotism and hero worship, a trap in which social groups can be caught:

To make a world where human kind can make its own future from moment to moment, free from one man's vision. Free from the perversion of the prophets words. And free of future pre-determined...

== Legacy ==
Dune has been widely influential, inspiring numerous novels, music, films, television, games, and comic books. It is considered one of the greatest and most influential science fiction novels of all time, with numerous modern science fiction works such as Star Wars owing their existence to Dune. Dune has also been referenced in numerous other works of popular culture, such as Star Trek, The Chronicles of Riddick, The Kingkiller Chronicle, and Futurama. Dune was cited as the prime inspiration for Hayao Miyazaki's manga, and later film, Nausicaä of the Valley of the Wind (1982–1994).

Jon Michaud noted in 2013 in The New Yorker, "what's curious about Dune's stature is that it has not penetrated popular culture in the way that The Lord of the Rings and Star Wars have." He praised Herbert's "clever authorial decision" to excise robots and computers ("two staples of the genre") from his fictional universe, but suggested that this may be one explanation why Dune lacks "true fandom among science-fiction fans".

Since 2009, the names of planets from the Dune novels have been adopted for the real-world nomenclature of plains (planitiae) and complexes of valleys (labyrinthi) on Saturn's moon Titan. Planet names used to date include Arrakis, Caladan, Giedi Prime, Kaitain, Salusa Secundus, and Tleilax. The Hagal dune field and other sites on Mars are informally named after planets mentioned in the Dune series. The city of Tacoma, Washington, Herbert's birthplace, dedicated part of Point Defiance Park as the "Dune Peninsula" to honor the writer and the series.

== In other media ==
=== Films ===
Film	U.S. release date	Directed by	Screenplay by	Based on	Distribution
Dune	December 14, 1984	David Lynch	David Lynch	Dune	Universal Pictures
Dune	October 22, 2021	Denis Villeneuve	Jon Spaihts, Denis Villeneuve and Eric Roth	Dune	Warner Bros. Pictures
Dune: Part Two	March 1, 2024	Denis Villeneuve	Jon Spaihts and Denis Villeneuve	Dune	Warner Bros. Pictures
Dune: Part Three	December 18, 2026	Denis Villeneuve	Denis Villeneuve and Brian K. Vaughan	Dune Messiah	Warner Bros. Pictures

In 1974, director and writer Alejandro Jodorowsky set about creating a cinematic adaptation, taking over the option that producer Arthur P. Jacobs had taken on the film adaptation rights in 1972 shortly before his death. Jodorowsky approached, among others, Peter Gabriel, the prog rock groups Pink Floyd and Magma for some of the music, artists H. R. Giger and Jean Giraud for set and character design, and Dan O'Bannon for special effects. Jodorowsky cast his own son Brontis Jodorowsky in the lead role of Paul Atreides, Salvador Dalí as Shaddam IV, Padishah Emperor, Amanda Lear as Princess Irulan, Orson Welles as Baron Vladimir Harkonnen, Gloria Swanson as Reverend Mother Gaius Helen Mohiam, David Carradine as Duke Leto Atreides, Geraldine Chaplin as Lady Jessica, Alain Delon as Duncan Idaho, Hervé Villechaize as Gurney Halleck, Udo Kier as Piter De Vries, and Mick Jagger as Feyd-Rautha. He began writing a vast script, so expansive that the film was thought to potentially last 14 hours. The project was scrapped for financial reasons, leaving Jodorowsky's unfinished handwritten script in a notebook that was partially published as a facsimile in 2012 as part of the 100 Notes – 100 Thoughts catalog of the 13th documenta exhibition. Frank Pavich directed a documentary about this unrealized project entitled Jodorowsky's Dune, which premiered at the 2013 Cannes Film Festival in May 2013, and was released theatrically in March 2014.

In 1984, Dino De Laurentiis and Universal Pictures released Dune, a feature film adaptation of the novel by director and writer David Lynch. The film stars Kyle MacLachlan as Paul Atreides, Jürgen Prochnow as Duke Leto Atreides, Francesca Annis as Lady Jessica, Sean Young as Chani, Kenneth McMillan as Baron Vladimir Harkonnen, Siân Phillips as Reverend Mother Gaius Helen Mohiam, Max von Sydow as Doctor Kynes, Sting as Feyd-Rautha, Freddie Jones as Thufir Hawat, Richard Jordan as Duncan Idaho, Everett McGill as Stilgar, Patrick Stewart as Gurney Halleck, Dean Stockwell as Doctor Wellington Yueh, and José Ferrer as Padishah Emperor Shaddam IV. Although a commercial and critical failure upon release, Frank Herbert himself was reportedly pleased with the film, as it stayed more faithful to the book than earlier film adaptation attempts. However, he had his reservations on its failures at the time, citing the lack of "imagination" in its marketing and estimated costs, and some of the filmmaker's production techniques. In 2021, Ballyhoo Motion Pictures released a documentary entitled The Sleeper Must Awaken: Making Dune. It chronicles the making of Lynch's Dune film. Initially intended to be released on a special feature for the Arrow Films' Dune disc release, it was later released on their paid streaming service Arrow Player.

In 2008, Paramount Pictures announced that it had a new feature film adaptation of Dune in development with Peter Berg set to direct; Berg dropped out of the project in October 2009, and director Pierre Morel was signed in January 2010. Paramount dropped the project in March 2011.

In November 2016, Legendary Pictures acquired the film and TV rights for Dune. Variety reported in December 2016 that Denis Villeneuve was in negotiations to direct Dune, which was confirmed in February 2017. In early 2018, Villeneuve stated that his goal was to adapt the novel into a two-part film series. He said in May 2018 that the first draft of the script had been finished. In July 2018, Brian Herbert confirmed that the latest draft of the screenplay covered "approximately half of the novel Dune." Timothée Chalamet was cast to play Paul Atreides. Greig Fraser joined the project as cinematographer in December 2018. In September 2018, it was reported that Rebecca Ferguson was in talks to play Jessica Atreides. In January 2019, Dave Bautista and Stellan Skarsgård joined the production, playing Glossu Rabban and Vladimir Harkonnen, respectively. It was reported later that month that Charlotte Rampling had been cast as Reverend Mother Mohiam, Oscar Isaac as Duke Leto, Zendaya as Chani, and Javier Bardem as Stilgar. In February 2019, Josh Brolin was cast as Gurney Halleck, Jason Momoa as Duncan Idaho, and David Dastmalchian as Piter De Vries. Filming began March 18, 2019, and the film was shot on location in Budapest, Hungary and Jordan. Distributed by Warner Bros. Pictures, Villeneuve's Dune was released on October 22, 2021. Dune was a critical and commercial success, leading Legendary Pictures to greenlight a sequel, Dune: Part Two, within that week. The film was released on March 1, 2024.

Prior to the release of Dune, Villeneuve confirmed at the 2021 Venice Film Festival that a film based on Dune Messiah was planned, and it would serve as the third film in a trilogy. After Dune: Part Two was officially greenlit in October 2021, Villeneuve reiterated his hope to continue the series with a third film focusing on Dune Messiah. Screenwriter Jon Spaihts confirmed in March 2022 that Villeneuve still planned on a third film. Villeneuve began writing a script for a Dune Messiah film in 2023. In February 2024, he said the script was "almost finished" but also wanted to take time to ensure his satisfaction, citing Hollywood's tendency of focusing on release dates over a film's overall quality. In April 2024, following the critical and commercial success of Dune: Part Two, Legendary Pictures confirmed that Dune: Part Three was in development with Villeneuve returning as director.

=== Television series ===
Series	Season	Episodes	Originally released			Developed by	Based on
Series	Season	Episodes	First released	Last released	Network	Developed by	Based on
Frank Herbert's Dune	1	3	December 3, 2000	December 6, 2000	Sci Fi Channel	John Harrison	Dune
Frank Herbert's Children of Dune	1	3	March 16, 2003	March 26, 2003	Sci Fi Channel	John Harrison	Dune Messiah and Children of Dune
Dune: Prophecy	1	6	November 17, 2024	December 22, 2024	HBO	Diane Ademu-John and Alison Schapker	Sisterhood of Dune
Dune: Prophecy	2	TBA	2026	TBA	HBO	Diane Ademu-John and Alison Schapker	Sisterhood of Dune

The Sci-Fi Channel premiered a three-part miniseries adaptation called Frank Herbert's Dune on December 3, 2000. Its March 16, 2003 sequel, Frank Herbert's Children of Dune, combined both Dune Messiah and Children of Dune. As of 2004, both miniseries were two of the three highest-rated programs ever to be broadcast on Syfy. Frank Herbert's Dune won two Primetime Emmy Awards in 2001, for Outstanding Cinematography for a Miniseries or Movie and Outstanding Special Visual Effects for a Miniseries, Movie or a Special. The miniseries was also nominated for an Emmy for Outstanding Sound Editing for a Miniseries, Movie or a Special. Frank Herbert's Children of Dune won the Primetime Emmy Award for Outstanding Special Visual Effects for a Miniseries, Movie or a Special in 2003. The miniseries was also nominated for Emmys for Outstanding Sound Editing for a Miniseries, Movie or a Special, Outstanding Hairstyling for a Limited Series or Movie, and Outstanding Makeup for a Limited Series or Movie (Non-Prosthetic).

In June 2019 it was announced that Legendary Television would be producing a spin-off television series, Dune: The Sisterhood, for WarnerMedia's streaming service, HBO Max. The series would focus on the Bene Gesserit and serve as a prequel to the 2021 film. Villeneuve was set to direct the series' pilot with Jon Spaihts writing the screenplay, and both would serve as executive producers alongside Brian Herbert. Though he initially served as showrunner, on November 5, 2019, The Hollywood Reporter reported that Spaihts had stepped down from this position to focus more on the sequel to the 2021 film. Diane Ademu-John had been hired as the new showrunner by July 2021. The series was retitled Dune: Prophecy in November 2023, and was moved to HBO in July 2024, and was set to premiere later that year. The series premiered on November 17, 2024.

=== Audiobooks ===
Macmillan Audio produced full-cast audiobook adaptations of all six novels in Frank Herbert's original Dune series between 2007 and 2009, featuring multiple narrators, sound effects, and musical scoring. As of March 2026, nearly nineteen years after their release, Dune and Dune Messiah ranked #3 and #12 respectively on the Audible Best Sellers chart for Space Opera Science Fiction.

Title	Release	Narrators	Awards
Dune	2007	Euan Morton (Paul Atreides), Scott Brick, Simon Vance, Orlagh Cassidy, Katherine Kellgren, and others	Audie Award for Science Fiction (2008); Audie Award finalist for Multi-Voiced Performance and Achievement in Production (2008); AudioFile Earphones Award
Dune Messiah	2007	Euan Morton (Paul Atreides), Scott Brick, Simon Vance, Katherine Kellgren, and others	—
Children of Dune	2008	Scott Brick, Simon Vance	—
God Emperor of Dune	2008	Simon Vance, Scott Brick, Katherine Kellgren	—
Heretics of Dune	2008	Simon Vance, Scott Brick	—
Chapterhouse: Dune	2009	Euan Morton, Scott Brick, Simon Vance, Katherine Kellgren	—

=== Comics and graphic novels ===
A comic adaptation of David Lynch's film Dune, by writer Ralph Macchio and artist Bill Sienkiewicz, was produced by Marvel Comics and was published in various formats. On December 1, 1984, it was published with Berkley in a small paperback as Dune: The Official Comic Book (ISBN 0-425-07623-7). It was later released as Marvel Super Special #36: Dune on April 1, 1985, and as a three-issue limited comic series from Marvel entitled Dune from April to June 1985.

In January 2020, Entertainment Weekly reported that Abrams Books was developing a three-part graphic novel adaptation of Dune, which was the first time the novel has been published in this format. The graphic novels were written by Brian Herbert and Anderson and illustrated by Raúl Allén and Patricia Martín, with covers by Bill Sienkiewicz. The first part, Dune: The Comic Novel, Book 1 was published on November 24, 2020, followed by Dune: The Graphic Novel, Book 2: Muad’Dib on August 2, 2022 and Dune: The Graphic Novel, Book 3: The Prophet on July 16, 2024.

In May 2020, Boom! Studios was announced to have acquired the comic and graphic novel rights to the 1999 prequel novel Dune: House Atreides, with the intent of doing a 12-issue comic adaptation written by the original authors Brian Herbert and Anderson. In 2021 they announced another 12-issue comic series based on Brian Herbert and Kevin J. Anderson's 2019 short story "Blood of the Sardaukar."

=== Video games ===
Six licensed Dune computer and video games have been released. The first was Dune (1992) developed by Cryo Interactive. Another game developed at the same time, Westwood Studios' Dune II (1992), is generally credited for popularizing and setting the template for the real-time strategy genre of computer games. Dune II is considered to be among the most influential video games of all time.

Dune 2000 (1998) is a remake of Dune II from Intelligent Games. Its sequel was the 3D video game Emperor: Battle for Dune (2001) by Intelligent Games/Westwood Studios/Electronic Arts. The 3D game Frank Herbert's Dune (2001) by Cryo Interactive/DreamCatcher Interactive is based on the 2000 Sci Fi Channel miniseries of the same name.

On February 26, 2019, Funcom announced that it was entering into an exclusive partnership with Legendary Pictures to develop games related to the upcoming Dune films. The first game, Dune: Spice Wars, developed by Shiro Games, was released in early access on April 26, 2022.

In January 2022, characters from both Rick and Morty parodies of Dune (in particular Paul Atreides-themed versions of Morty Smith) were made available as playable characters in the franchise video game Pocket Mortys.

On August 23, 2022, Funcom revealed Dune: Awakening at Gamescom Opening Night Live 2022 with its first trailer. It was released on June 10, 2025, on Steam and PC Xbox/Windows Store, with console ports for PlayStation 5 and Xbox Series X/S planned for release in 2026.

=== Other games ===
Cover of the collectible card game Dune (1997)

The board game Dune was released by Avalon Hill in 1979, followed by a Parker Brothers game Dune in 1984. A 1997 collectible card game called Dune was followed by the role-playing game Dune: Chronicles of the Imperium in 2000. The 1979 Avalon Hill game was republished by Gale Force Nine in 2019. The board game Dune: Imperium was published by Dire Wolf in 2021. In May 2021, a tabletop RPG, Dune: Adventures in the Imperium, was released by Modiphius Entertainment. It won a Gold ENNIE Award for "Best Writing" and was also nominated for "Product of the Year".

== Merchandising ==
A line of Dune action figures from toy company LJN was released to lackluster sales in 1984. Styled after David Lynch's film, the collection featured figures of Paul Atreides, Baron Harkonnen, Feyd, Rabban, Stilgar, and a Sardaukar warrior, plus a poseable sandworm, several vehicles and weapons, and a set of View-Master stereoscope reels. Figures of Gurney and Lady Jessica previewed in LJN's catalog were never produced. In 2006, SOTA Toys produced a Baron Harkonnen action figure for their "Now Playing Presents" line. In October 2019, Funko announced a "Dune Classic" line of POP! vinyl figures, the first of which are Paul in a stillsuit and Feyd in a blue jumpsuit, styled after Lynch's film. An alternate version of Feyd in his blue loincloth was released for the 2019 New York Comic Con.

Soundtrack albums have been released for the 1984 film, the 2000 TV miniseries, and the 2003 Children of Dune miniseries, as well as the 1992 video game, the 2001 computer game Emperor: Battle for Dune, and select tracks from the entire series of Dune video games.

=== Lego ===
Logo.

Lego Dune (stylized as LEGO Dune) is a Lego theme based on the Dune franchise, specifically styled after the 2021 film adaptation Dune by Denis Villeneuve. The theme was first unveiled on October 24, 2023, and released on February 1, 2024.

On October 24, 2023, The LEGO Group announced a Lego set based on the ornithopter that appears in the 2021 film Dune. The set is aimed at an 18+ audience, and sells for $164.99. It was released on February 1, 2024.

The Lego Dune theme features eight Lego minifigures based on the film: Paul Atreides, Lady Jessica, Gurney Halleck, Chani, Leto Atreides I, Liet Kynes, Duncan Idaho and Baron Vladimir Harkonnen. The figure for Baron Harkonnen is especially notable for its large height and very long robe.

== Reception ==
=== Book awards ===
In the following table, all works are by Frank Herbert unless stated otherwise.

Year	Award	Category	Recipient	Result	Ref.
1964	1964 Hugo Awards	Best Novel	"Dune World" (Note: "Dune World" was the title of the 1964 serialized novel; when "Dune World" and its sequel, "The Prophet of Dune", were incorporated into the 1965 edition of Dune, the book edition was allowed to be nominated in 1966.)	Nominated	
1966	1965 Nebula Awards	Best Novel	Dune	Won	
1966	1966 Hugo Awards	Best Novel	Dune	Won	
1974	1974 Seiun Awards	Best Translated Long Work	Dune	Won	
1975	1975 Locus Poll	Best All-Time Novel	Dune	Won	
1977	1977 Hugo Awards	Best Novel	Children of Dune	Nominated	
1977	1977 Locus Awards	Best Novel	Children of Dune	4	
1982	1982 Locus Awards	Best SF Novel	God Emperor of Dune	6	
1985	1985 Locus Awards	Best SF Novel	Heretics of Dune	17	
1986	1986 Locus Awards	Best SF Novel	Chapterhouse: Dune	20	
1986	1986 Locus Awards	Best Collection	Eye (Note: The collection includes the short story "The Road to Dune".)	19	
1987	1987 Locus Poll	Best All-Time SF Novel	Dune	Won	
1988	1988 Locus Awards	Best Nonfiction	The Maker of Dune: insights of a master of science fiction	13	
1998	1998 Locus Poll	Best All-Time SF Novel before 1990	Dune	Won	
2000	2000 Geffen Awards	Best Translated SF Novel	Dune: House Atreides by Brian Herbert and Kevin J. Anderson	Won	
2004	2004 Hugo Awards	Best Related Non-Fiction Book	Dreamer of Dune: The Biography of Frank Herbert by Brian Herbert	Nominated	
2004	2004 Locus Awards	Best Non-Fiction or Art	Dreamer of Dune: The Biography of Frank Herbert by Brian Herbert	6	
2012	2012 Locus Poll	Best 20th Century SF Novel	Dune	Won	
2022	2022 Dragon Awards	Best Graphic Novel	Dune: House Atreides Volume 2 by Brian Herbert, Kevin J. Anderson, and Dev Pramanik	Won	
2023	2023 Dragon Awards	Best Comic Book or Graphic Novel	Dune: House Harkonnen by Brian Herbert, Kevin J. Anderson, and Michael Shelfer	Won	

=== Box office performance ===
Film	Box office gross			Box office ranking		Budget	Ref.
Film	North America	Other territories	Worldwide	US and Canada	Worldwide	Budget	Ref.
Dune (1984)	$30,925,690	$55,301	$30,983,782	–	–	$40 million	
Dune (2021)	$108,897,830	$297,120,170	$406,018,000	#698	–	$165 million	
Dune: Part Two	$282,144,358	$432,300,000	$714,444,358	–	–	$190 million	
Totals 2021 & 2024	$391,042,188	$729,420,170	$1,120,462,358	—N/a	—N/a	$355 million	
List indicator^{(A)} indicates the adjusted totals based on current ticket prices (calculated by Box Office Mojo).

== See also ==
- Eugenics in science fiction
- Evolution in fiction
- Hydraulic empire
- Neo-medievalism
- Reactionary modernism
- Speculative evolution

== Bibliography ==
- Batt, Jason D. 2020. "Strange Water: An Exile into the Deep Self in Frank Herbert's Dune." Mythological Studies Journal 8:9-14.
