= Vladimir Harkonnen =

Fictional character in the Dune universe

Baron Vladimir Harkonnen
- Dune character
- Baron Vladimir Harkonnen by John Schoenherr, from The Illustrated Dune (1978)
- First appearance: Dune (1963–65)
- Last appearance: Dune: House Corrino (2001) (Note: A ghola of Baron Harkonnen is created in Hunters of Dune (2006) and also appears in Sandworms of Dune (2007); these may or may not be considered appearances of the original character.)
- Created by: Frank Herbert
- Portrayed by: Kenneth McMillan (1984 film); Ian McNeice (2000 series / 2003 series); Stellan Skarsgård (2021 / 2024 films)

In-universe information
- Title: Baron
- Family: House Harkonnen
- Children: Lady Jessica
- Relatives: Original series: Glossu Rabban (nephew); Feyd-Rautha (nephew); Paul Atreides (grandson); Alia Atreides (granddaughter); Abulurd Harkonnen II (brother); Prequel series: Dmitri Harkonnen (father); Victoria Harkonnen (mother)
- Home: Giedi Prime

Baron Vladimir Harkonnen (/ˈhɑːrkənən/) is a fictional character in the Dune franchise created by Frank Herbert. He is primarily featured in Herbert's 1965 novel Dune, and is also a prominent character in the Prelude to Dune prequel trilogy (1999–2001) by Herbert's son Brian and Kevin J. Anderson. The character is brought back as a ghola in the Herbert/Anderson sequels which conclude the original series, Hunters of Dune (2006) and Sandworms of Dune (2007).

Baron Harkonnen is portrayed by Kenneth McMillan in David Lynch's 1984 film Dune. Ian McNeice plays the role in the 2000 Sci-Fi Channel miniseries Frank Herbert's Dune and its sequel, 2003's Children of Dune. Harkonnen is portrayed by Stellan Skarsgård in the 2021 Denis Villeneuve film Dune and its 2024 sequel Dune: Part Two.

== Conception ==
Frank Herbert wanted a harsh-sounding name for the antagonistic family opposing House Atreides in Dune. He came across the name "Härkönen" in a California telephone book and thought that it sounded "Soviet", though it is in fact Finnish. In earlier drafts of Dune, the character was called "Valdemar Hoskanner".

== Description ==
Herbert's "Appendix IV: The Almanak en-Ashraf (Selected Excerpts of the Noble Houses)" in Dune says of Harkonnen (in part):

VLADIMIR HARKONNEN (10,110–10,193) Commonly referred to as Baron Harkonnen, his title is officially Siridar (planetary governor) Baron. Vladimir Harkonnen is the direct-line male descendant of the Bashar Abulurd Harkonnen who was banished for cowardice after the Battle of Corrin. The return of House Harkonnen to power generally is ascribed to adroit manipulation of the whale fur market and later consolidation with melange wealth from Arrakis.

The character is usually described as the main antagonist of the novel. Herbert writes in Dune that the Baron possesses a "basso voice" and is so "grossly and immensely fat" that he requires anti-gravity devices known as suspensors to support his weight. He is one of the wealthiest members of the Landsraad and a bitter rival of Leto Atreides, and the Baron's "legendary evil and intellect" are unmatched by anyone else from House Harkonnen. In the novel, the Baron feigns outrage over losing control of Arrakis to Leto, but is actually conspiring to use the situation as an opportunity to destroy House Atreides once and for all.

William Hughes of The A.V. Club describes the Baron as "a decadent, monstrous gasbag of depravity and evil". As ruthless and cruel as he is intelligent and cunning, the Baron is "crafty and power-hungry" and has a talent for manipulating others and exploiting their weaknesses as well as a propensity for torture and blackmail. IGN describes the character as "cruel, sadistic, and hedonistic". Travis Johnson of Flicks.com.au says that Harkonnen is written as "a predatory homosexual given to pederasty and incest, an unrepentant rapist and murderer." The Baron's sexual preference for young men is implied in Dune and Children of Dune. It is noted, however, that he "once permitted himself to be seduced" by a Bene Gesserit in the liaison which produced his secret daughter.

== Plotlines ==
The blue griffin emblem of House Harkonnen

=== Dune ===
As Dune begins, a longstanding feud exists between the Harkonnens of Giedi Prime and the Atreides of Caladan. The Baron's intent to exterminate the Atreides line seems close to fruition, as Duke Leto Atreides is lured to the desert planet Arrakis on the pretense of taking over the valuable melange operation there. The Baron has an agent in the Atreides household: Leto's own physician, the trusted Suk doctor Wellington Yueh. Though Suk Imperial Conditioning supposedly makes the subject incapable of inflicting harm, the Baron's twisted Mentat Piter De Vries has managed to break it using the threat of interminable torture on Yueh's captive wife Wanna.

Harkonnen also distracts Leto's Mentat Thufir Hawat from discovering Yueh by guiding Hawat toward another suspect: Leto's Bene Gesserit concubine Lady Jessica, of whom Hawat is already distrustful. The Atreides are soon attacked by Harkonnen forces, secretly supplemented by the seemingly unstoppable Imperial Sardaukar, as Yueh disables the protective shields around the Atreides palace on Arrakis. Yueh takes Leto prisoner as instructed, but provides him with a fake tooth filled with poisonous gas as a means to assassinate the Baron. De Vries kills Yueh, Leto and De Vries die from the gas, but Harkonnen survives. The Baron then manipulates Hawat into his service, by convincing Hawat that Jessica was the traitor and using Hawat's desire for revenge on her and the Emperor as motivation to assist House Harkonnen.

Jessica flees into the desert with her and Leto's son Paul Atreides, and both are presumed dead. Paul's prescience helps him determine the identity of Jessica's father, the "maternal grandfather who cannot be named"—the Baron himself. Over the next two years, Harkonnen learns that his nephews Glossu Rabban and Feyd-Rautha are conspiring against him to usurp his throne. He lets them continue to do so, reasoning that they have to somehow learn to organize a conspiracy. As punishment for a failed assassination attempt against him, Harkonnen forces Feyd to single-handedly slaughter all the female slaves who serve as Feyd's lovers. He explains that Feyd has to learn the price of failure.

The Baron's plan to assure Feyd's power is to install him as ruler of Arrakis after a period of tyrannical misrule by Rabban, making Feyd appear to be the savior of the people. However, a crisis on Arrakis begins when the mysterious Muad'Dib emerges as a leader of the native Fremen tribes, uniting them against the rule of the Harkonnens. Eventually, a series of Fremen victories against Beast Rabban threaten to disrupt the trade of the spice, inciting the Padishah Emperor Shaddam IV to intervene personally, leading several legions of Sardaukar. After the emperor's arrival on Arrakis, both Corrino and Harkonnen are shocked to learn that rather than a native Fremen warlord, their opponent Muad'Dib is the still-living Paul Atreides, and the Emperor's intervention was part of his plan.

The Imperial forces fall prey to a surprise attack by the Fremen, who let a sandstorm short out the force field shields of the transport ships, and then disable them with projectile weapons, subsequently mounting a mass assault using sandworms as siege-breakers. Their enemies are left trapped on the planet, outnumbered by the many tribes and outgunned by the sandworms. The Harkonnens' past ruthlessness further causes the enraged Fremen to give them little to no quarter. Over the course of the battle their entire army is exterminated.

The Harkonnen leadership are also all killed in the course of this battle. Rabban dies first, in the early stages of the battle. Baron Harkonnen himself is poisoned with a gom jabbar by Paul's sister Alia Atreides, a four-year-old born as a fully aware Fremen Reverend Mother, who reveals that she is his granddaughter to him just before his death. His remaining heir Feyd-Rautha is killed in ritual combat by Paul Atreides. House Harkonnen as a political entity is left virtually defunct - permanently excluded from galactic power - though Harkonnen blood is technically ascendant since Imperial House Atreides is composed partly of Vladimir Harkonnen's descendants (through his daughter - the Lady Jessica).

=== Children of Dune ===
Alia had been born with her ancestral memories in the womb, a circumstance the Bene Gesserit refer to as Abomination, because in their experience it is inevitable that the individual will become possessed by the personality of one of their ancestors. In Children of Dune, Alia falls victim to this prediction when she shares control of her body with the ego-memory of the Baron Harkonnen, and eventually falls under his power. Alia eventually commits suicide, realizing that Harkonnen's consciousness has surpassed her abilities to contain him.

=== Prelude to Dune ===
In the Prelude to Dune prequel series by Brian Herbert and Anderson, it is established that Baron Vladimir Harkonnen is the son and heir of Dmitri Harkonnen and his wife Victoria. Harkonnen's father had been the head of House Harkonnen and ruled the planet Giedi Prime. Trained since youth as a possible successor, Vladimir had been eventually chosen over his half-brother Abulurd, namesake of the original. Unhappy with his brother's doings, Abulurd eventually marries Emmi Rabban and renounces the family name and his rights to the title.

Under the name Abulurd Rabban, he reigns as governor of the secondary Harkonnen planet Lankiveil. Abulurd and his wife have two sons: Glossu Rabban, later nicknamed "Beast Rabban" after he murders his own father, and Feyd-Rautha. Vladimir later adopts the boys back into House Harkonnen, and Feyd becomes his designated heir. The Baron's most prominent political rival is Duke Leto Atreides. The Harkonnens and the Atreides have been bitter enemies for over 10,000 years, since the Battle of Corrin that ended the Butlerian Jihad. When Emperor Shaddam IV orchestrates a plot to destroy the "Red Duke" Leto, the Baron eagerly lends his aid.

The young Baron Vladimir Harkonnen is described as an exceedingly handsome man, possessing red hair and a near-perfect physique. The Bene Gesserit Reverend Mother Gaius Helen Mohiam is instructed by the Sisterhood to collect his genetic material, through conception, for their breeding program. As the Baron's homosexuality is something of an open secret, Mohiam blackmails him into having sexual relations with her, and conceives his child. When that daughter proves genetically undesirable, Mohiam kills her and returns to Harkonnen for a second try. At this point, he drugs and rapes her. She exacts her retribution by infecting him with a rare, incurable disease that later causes his obesity. Mohiam's second child with the Baron is Jessica. (Note: According to the authors, the revelation that Mohiam is Jessica's mother was pulled directly from Frank Herbert's working notes for the original Dune series.)

In Dune: House Harkonnen, the deteriorating Baron at first walks with the assistance of a cane, then relies on belt-mounted suspensors to retain mobility. He consults numerous doctors in the expanse of time between the Dune: House Atreides and Dune: House Harkonnen, up to and including his future instrument Dr. Yueh, all of whom are ultimately no help. To conceal this debilitation, he pretends that his obesity is due to intentional overindulgence, lest the Landsraad remove him from power. When he determines that Mohiam inflicted him with the disease, he attempts to coerce her into revealing the cure, but soon discovers that there is none. The Baron, Duke Leto, and Jessica are unaware that Jessica is secretly the Baron's daughter, or that he has even fathered one. In the year 10,176, the Baron's grandson Paul is born to Leto and Jessica.

=== Hunters of Dune ===
In Hunters of Dune (2006), the continuation of the original series by Brian Herbert and Kevin J. Anderson, the Baron is resurrected as a ghola (5,029 years after the death of Alia) by the Lost Tleilaxu Uxtal, acting on orders from the Face Dancer Khrone. Khrone intends to use the Baron ghola to manipulate a ghola of Paul Atreides, named Paolo. Khrone tries various torture techniques for three years to awaken the 12-year-old Baron's genetic memories; these methods fail due to the Baron's sadomasochistic nature. Khrone is successful when he imprisons the Baron in a sensory deprivation tank for a prolonged period; the Baron's memories of his former life return. The reincarnated Baron is soon haunted by the voice of Alia in his mind; the source of this inner Alia is never explained.

== In adaptations ==
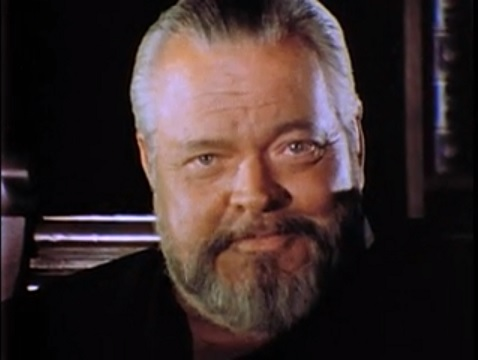
Orson Welles was cast as the Baron in Alejandro Jodorowsky's cancelled adaptation

Kenneth McMillan plays Vladimir Harkonnen in Dune (1984).

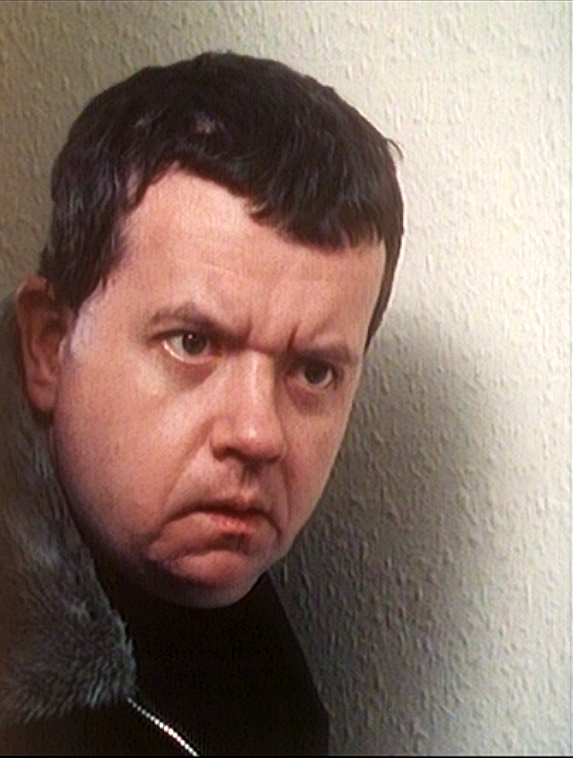
Ian McNeice plays Baron Harkonnen in the Dune miniseries (2000).

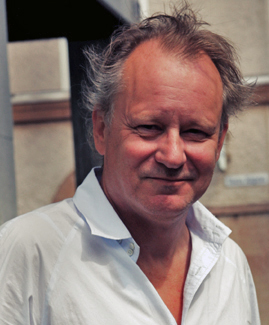
Stellan Skarsgård plays Baron Harkonnen in the 2021 film Dune and its 2024 sequel Dune: Part Two.

=== Cancelled 1970s film ===
In 1975, Orson Welles agreed to play the Baron in Alejandro Jodorowsky's ultimately unsuccessful adaptation. The film's concept art by Jean "Mœbius" Giraud depicts the Baron, as well as Feyd-Rautha and Rabban, in multiple drag appearances. In the documentary Jodorowsky's Dune, the director discussed the casting:

Orson Welles had a bad reputation ... they said that he liked to drink and eat ... and then he did not finish the movies, he was moody. But I said, "No, Orson Welles is a genius, he is the one." ... Therefore, I sent a secretary to ask... in all the gastronomic restaurants in Paris: "Where does Orson Welles eat?" And we discover a restaurant and then he was eating ... I speak with all the respect, because was for me [he] was an idol. He say, "I don't want to do it. I don't want any more." I say to him, "I will propose something." If you do the picture, even if we pay what you want as an actor, I will hire the chef of this restaurant and you will eat, as here, every day. And he say, "I do it."

=== 1984 film ===
Baron Harkonnen is portrayed by Kenneth McMillan in David Lynch's 1984 film. The obese and disheveled Baron is overtly unstable, and covered in oozing pustules. William Hughes of The A.V. Club deemed McMillan's facial prosthetics "very memorable". Emmet Asher-Perrin of Tor.com wrote that "Lynch's attempt is infamous for really leaning on [the] codified aspects of the Baron, to the point where his sore-ridden appearance has been called out as a likely connection to the AIDS epidemic, which was a prevalent health crisis while the film was in production." Travis Johnson of Flicks.com.au noted that the Lynch film embraced "the archetype of the depraved gay sadist", which would not be acceptable in 2019. Asher-Perrin added, "Lynch also makes a point of connecting the Baron's desire for men to deviancy and violence, deliberately juxtaposing his assault of a young man played by Ernesto Laguardia with a tender love-scene between Duke Leto and Lady Jessica Atreides."

=== 2000 miniseries ===
Ian McNeice plays the Baron in the 2000 Sci-Fi Channel miniseries Frank Herbert's Dune, and its sequel, 2003's Children of Dune. Asher-Perrin notes that the miniseries played down the negative aspects emphasized by the Lynch film, and writes, "[The Baron's] appearance was not altered to make him seem ill, he never physically attacks anyone, and the miniseries paid more attention to the fact that the Baron was a rapist, his preference for men being incidental." He praises McNeice as a standout among the cast, writing that he "manages to make the Baron Harkonnen—easily one of the most despicable characters in science fiction literature—every bit as conniving and vicious as he needs to be...and every bit as fascinating. McNeice has a superb sense of how to make the baron mesmerizing to watch no matter how odiously he behaves". Austin Jones of Paste writes, "McNeice commands his role as Baron Harkonnen, capturing the vile indulgence and vanity of a feudal lord".

=== 2021 and 2024 films ===
Baron Harkonnen is portrayed by Stellan Skarsgård in the 2021 Denis Villeneuve film Dune and its 2024 sequel Dune: Part Two. Skarsgård called the role "small but important", and noted, "I had seven hours in make-up every day because I had to be really fat." Villeneuve said:

As much as I deeply love the book, I felt that the baron was flirting very often with caricature. And I tried to bring him a bit more dimension. That's why I brought in Stellan. Stellan has something in the eyes. You feel that there's someone thinking, thinking, thinking—that has tension and is calculating inside, deep in the eyes. I can testify, it can be quite frightening.

== Merchandising and influence ==
A line of Dune action figures from toy company LJN was released to lackluster sales in 1984. Styled after David Lynch's film, the collection featured a figure of Baron Harkonnen, as well as other characters. In 2006, SOTA Toys produced a Baron Harkonnen action figure for their "Now Playing Presents" line.

In February 2024, a Lego Dune playset based on the Atreides ornithopter from the 2021 Dune film was released, containing a Baron Harkonnen Lego minifigure, notable for its extreme height and long robe.

H. R. Giger's Harkonnen Chair is a chair originally designed by the artist as set dressing for an unrealized 1970s adaptation of Dune by Alejandro Jodorowsky.

== Analysis ==
Thomas West of Screen Rant writes that "there are few science fiction villains quite as compelling and darkly charismatic as the Baron". William Hughes of The A.V. Club calls the Baron "one of the most iconically awful villains in all of science fiction". Stuart Conover of ScienceFiction.com describes him as "one of the most insidious villains". Maude Campbell of Popular Mechanics writes that the Baron is "one of the most evil characters ever put to paper (including Darth Vader)", and Jon Michaud of The New Yorker compares "Herbert's scheming, backstabbing villain, the Baron Vladimir Harkonnen" to the villainous Lannister family of George R. R. Martin's A Song of Ice and Fire series.

Emmet Asher-Perrin suggests that "what makes the Baron truly monstrous [is] the fact that he spends all of his time plotting murder, sowing discord, and destroying populations of people to get his way". Hughes writes that the evil Harkonnen is "specifically designed to make the noble Atreides family seem that extra bit more dignified and pure". Jesse Schedeen of IGN agrees that the Baron is "as cruel and vindictive as Leto is noble and just." Hughes says that Herbert "successfully made [the Baron] so vampirically vile that he casts a (sometimes literal) shadow over the entire series." Sandy Schaefer of Screen Rant calls the Baron "a deliciously despicable antagonist".

While the novel suggests that the Baron's obesity might be the result of a genetic disease, the Prelude to Dune prequel trilogy by Brian Herbert and Kevin J. Anderson explains that Harkonnen was once a fit, attractive but vain man who is given the incurable disease intentionally by the Bene Gesserit Reverend Mother Mohiam after he drugs and rapes her. Asher-Perrin suggests that in this narrative, "The Baron's corpulence is meant to be comeuppance for doing something reprehensible, a physical punishment meant to hurt his vanity by taking away the attractiveness he so prized in himself."

== Family tree ==
House Atreides family tree

House Atreides
House Harkonnen
House Corrino | Baron Vladimir; Harkonnen | Tanidia Nerus (Note: The Prelude to Dune prequel series (1999–2001) establishes that Tanidia Nerus is an alias of Gaius Helen Mohiam.)
Anirul | Shaddam IV | Leto I Atreides | Lady Jessica (Note: In Dune (1965), Jessica is the concubine of Leto I, and Chani becomes the concubine of their son, Paul.)
Count Dalak; Kenola | Princess Wensicia | Princess Irulan | Paul Atreides | Chani
Josifa | Farad'n | Ghanima Atreides | Leto II Atreides | Leto II Atreides; The Elder (Note: The infant Leto II Atreides is murdered in Dune, and his brother Leto II is later also named after their grandfather, Leto I, in Children of Dune (1976).) | Duncan Idaho
Chalice | Rugi | Many generations (Note: Per God Emperor of Dune, Duncan Idaho gholas was used several times in Leto II's breeding program) | Alia Atreides | Hayt (Note: Hayt is a ghola of Duncan Idaho, a kind of clone made using his corpse.)
Moneo Atreides
Siona Atreides
Many generations
Miles Teg
Darwi Odrade
