= Dune: Chronicles of the Imperium =

2000 tabletop role-playing game

Dune: Chronicles of the Imperium is a role-playing game published by Last Unicorn Games in 2000.

== History ==
Brian Herbert entered into negotiations with Last Unicorn Games (LUG) in 1996 from which LUG acquired the license to the Dune novels, and they designed the Dune Collectible Card Game (1997), which Five Rings Publishing Group developed and published. LUG was able to finish their work on a Dune role-playing game, but the game was not printed due to legal disputes regarding the Herbert license. Wizards of the Coast acquired LUG in July 2000, and as part of the deal Wizards agreed to release LUG's remaining projects, including the Icon system-based Dune: Chronicles of the Imperium (2000); Wizards published 3,000 copies as a limited release, most of which were sold at Gen Con 33 and overseas conventions, but the limited print run did not satisfy the demand for the game. Afterwards, the Frank Herbert estate offered to renegotiate but they asked for much higher fees from Wizards for the license than they had received from LUG; thus Wizards did not retain the Dune license, and a d20 Dune supplement in progress from the Last Unicorn team was also shelved.

== Description ==
The game is set in the Dune universe. Production of the game was delayed first by legal issues and then by Wizards of the Coast purchasing Last Unicorn Games, but Wizards finally published a "Limited Edition" run of 3000 copies of a core rule-book, pending the company converting the game to its d20 role-playing game system and a subsequent wider release. The company later announced that the game would be discontinued.

Dune: Chronicles of the Imperium was developed by Last Unicorn Games, but published by Wizards of the Coast after the acquisition.

Val Mayerik did interior art for the game.
