= Härkönen =

Härkönen is a Finnish surname. Notable people with the surname include:

- Armas Härkönen (1903–1981), Finnish politician
- Anna-Leena Härkönen (b. 1965), Finnish writer
- Arto Härkönen (b. 1959), Finnish javelin thrower
- Jorma Härkönen (b. 1956), Finnish runner
- Juho Härkönen, Finnish sociologist
- Kari Härkönen (b. 1959), Finnish cross country skier
- Masi Härkönen (b. 2006), Finnish hockey player

== See also ==
- Harkonnen (disambiguation)
