= Dune: Imperium =

2020 board game by Paul Dennen

- Designers: Paul Dennen
- Publishers: Dire Wolf Digital
- Publication: 2020
- Players: 1–4
- Playing time: 60–120 minutes
- Website: www.direwolfdigital.com/dune-imperium/

Dune: Imperium is a 2020 board game designed by Paul Dennen and published by Dire Wolf Digital. In the board game, which is set in Frank Herbert's Dune universe, players use deck-building and worker placement to gain alliances with factions and combat to earn victory points. Upon its release, the game was nominated for several awards, including the Kennerspiel des Jahres.

== Gameplay ==
Dune: Imperium is a deck-building worker placement game. Players start with a deck of ten cards and a leader with asymmetric abilities. During each round, players draw five cards and play them on their turn to send agents to locations that provide benefits like resources (spice, water, and Solari), card draws, troop deployments, or alliances with factions. After all agents are deployed, any remaining cards in hand can be revealed for further benefits. The combat is then resolved and rewards are distributed. The game ends when a player reaches ten or more victory points or the last conflict card is resolved. The player with the most victory points is the winner.

== Reception ==
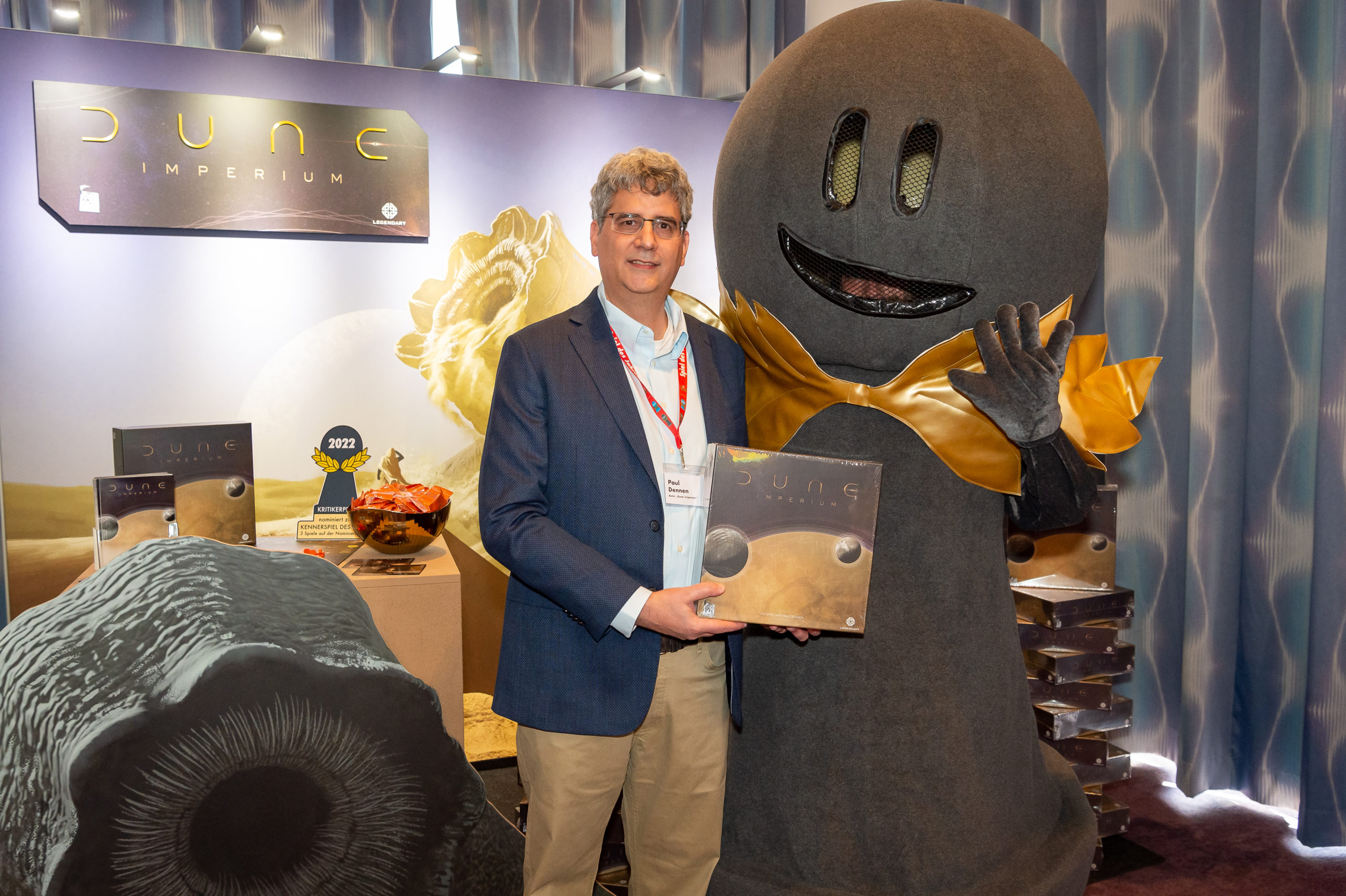
Dune: Imperium's designer Paul Dennen (left), at the booth promoting his game, at the Spiel des Jahres

Reviewing for IGN, Matt Thrower described that the components "opts function over form", praising the leader cards but critiquing the art as serviceable and "standard fare". The reviewer praised the reveal turns, the "resource pyramid dilemma" through the three resources, the strategic elements as a "rich soup of tactical decisions", and the accessibility. However, he was critical of the game's originality, scalability, and the theme, critiquing the abstract combat mechanic. Thrower concluded that "Dune: Imperium is an impressive game that's accessible, varied, and has an appeal that reaches across a wide range of gaming tastes." Charlie Hall from Polygon recommended the game, and also praised the accessibility of the deck-building mechanism, engagement, and the companion application. Unlike Thrower, who criticised the scalability under three players and described the AI player in the two-player mode as an "annoying distraction", Hall praised the single-player mode.

The Dicebreaker reviewer George Barker similarly commented on the two main mechanics as "extremely familiar" but praised the game as overall a "satisfying sum of its parts", commenting that the game "manages to combine worker-placement and deckbuilding in a way that just works". Despite broadly describing the game as accessible, Barker said that "For new players, being confronted with a choice of 22 different action spaces to which you can dispatch agents is a little daunting." The reviewer critiqued the limited deck-building, the choice of deck-building cards in the solo mode as "frustratingly constricted", and the combat, which Barker described was disappointing due to the lack of "more clever subterfuge involved" and the luck of the draw. Luke Plunkett, reviewing from Kotaku, praised the worker-placement mechanism but criticised the components as "basic, mostly abstract wooden tokens" and the theme, stating that the game was a "different game that had the licence papered over the top of it" with a basic combat system.

The game was also nominated for the 2022 Kennerspiel des Jahres award. The jury stated that the game was "a clever enhancement of the classic worker placement mechanic", praising the acquisition mechanism, the player interaction, the theme, and the strategy. The game also placed third place in the Deutscher Spiele Preis.

== Expansions and spinoffs ==
An expansion, Rise of Ix, was published in late 2021. A second expansion, Immortality, was published in late 2022. A third expansion, Bloodlines, was announced in August 2024. Bloodlines was released in January 2025, featuring compatibility with both Dune: Imperium and Dune Imperium: Uprising. In 2026, the expansion Conspiracy was released as a tie-in to Dune: Part Three.

In 2023, Dune Imperium: Uprising was released. Uprising is a standalone game which acts as a replacement for, or alternative to, the original Dune: Imperium game. Uprising is also compatible with Rise of Ix and Immortality.
