= Fremen =

Fictional group of people in the Dune franchise created by Frank Herbert

- Dune franchise element
- Fremen Chani (Zendaya) and Stilgar (Javier Bardem) wearing stillsuits in Dune (2021)
- First appearance: Dune; 1965
- Created by: Frank Herbert
- Genre: Science fiction

In-universe information
- Type: Human culture
- Traits and abilities: Desert survival, water conservation, fighting abilities
- Affiliation: House Atreides; Sandworms

The Fremen /ˈfriːmən/ are a group of people in the fictional Dune universe created by Frank Herbert. First appearing in the 1965 novel Dune, the Fremen inhabit the desert planet Arrakis (also known as Dune), which is the sole known source in the universe of the all-important drug melange. Long overlooked by the rest of the Imperium and considered backward savages, they are an extremely hardy people and exist in large numbers. The Fremen had come to the planet thousands of years before the events of the novel as the Zensunni Wanderers, a persecuted religious sect originating from the Nile region of Earth, who had migrated across many planets before finding Arrakis. Their religion was a hybrid of Zen Buddhism and Sufi Islam, with other spiritual practices and beliefs woven into their culture after generations spent on alien planets. As humans in extremis, over time they adapted their culture and way of life to survive and thrive in the incredibly harsh conditions of Arrakis. The Fremen are distinguished by their fierce fighting abilities and adeptness at survival in these conditions. With water being a rare commodity on the planet, their culture revolves around its preservation and conservation. Herbert based Fremen culture, in part, on the desert-dwelling Bedouin and San peoples.

== Origins ==
Dune was inspired by Herbert's research for a potential article about the United States Department of Agriculture's attempt to use poverty grasses to stabilize the Oregon Dunes in Florence, Oregon. Herbert learned that the moving dunes could "swallow whole cities, lakes, rivers, highways." He said that in studying sand dunes, we must analyze the "black foot (people) of the Kalahari and how they utilize every drop of water. You can't just stop with the people who are living in this type of environment: you have to go on to how the environment works on the people and how they work on their environment." Herbert based Fremen culture, in part, on the desert-dwelling Bedouin and San People.

In an early, alternate Dune outline by Frank Herbert called Spice Planet, the Fremen are called the "Free Men". The Free Men were convicts who had been transported to "Duneworld" to work for the spice operation of the "Hoskanners" in exchange for a reduction in their sentence.

== Plot ==
In Dune, Duke Leto Atreides, his Bene Gesserit concubine Lady Jessica, and their son Paul arrive on Arrakis to take control of melange mining operations there. The mysterious Fremen housekeeper at the palace of Arrakeen is known as the Shadout Mapes, and when Paul saves her life from a deadly hunter-seeker intended to kill him, Mapes warns of a traitor in the Atreides household. She is killed by that same traitor, Suk doctor Wellington Yueh, as the Harkonnens attack. Leto is killed, and Paul and Jessica flee into the deep desert and find shelter with the Fremen of Sietch Tabr. Paul is immediately challenged by the Fremen warrior Jamis, and when he kills Jamis in a ritual fight to the death, Paul is faced with the Fremen custom of taking responsibility for Jamis's wife Harah and her children. A key to Fremen survival in the harsh conditions of Arrakis is their ritualistic conservation of water. Paul rises as a leader among the Fremen, learning their ways while he and Jessica train them in the Bene Gesserit weirding way fighting discipline. Paul also becomes close to Chani, the daughter of Imperial Planetologist Liet-Kynes and his Fremen wife. Harah tries to explain to the superstitious and wary Fremen the unique nature of Paul's younger sister Alia, who was changed in the womb as Jessica underwent a Fremen/Bene Gesserit ritual to replace the Fremen Reverend Mother Ramallo. Paul leads the Fremen to take back Arrakis from the Harkonnens and Padishah Emperor Shaddam IV, placing himself on the throne.

In Dune Messiah (1969), a religion has arisen around Paul, and a jihad is being fought in his name across the universe. Korba, one of the Fedaykin death commandos in Dune, has become one of the chief priests of the religion of Muad'Dib. Another Fedaykin, Farok, is one of many Fremen disillusioned by the changes Paul's regime brings to their culture, and he joins the conspiracy to unseat Paul initiated by the Spacing Guild, Tleilaxu, and Bene Gesserit. Lichna, the daughter of Paul's trusted Fedaykin Otheym, is killed and impersonated by the Tleilaxu Face Dancer Scytale as a means to infiltrate Paul's household, which ultimately fails. Chani dies giving birth to Paul's twin heirs, Leto II and Ghanima, and a blinded Paul follows Fremen tradition and walks into the desert to die.

As regent for Leto II and Ghanima, Alia struggles to control Paul's virtually uncontrollable religion in Children of Dune (1976). She succumbs to possession by the persona of her grandfather, Baron Vladimir Harkonnen, and Sietch Tabr leader Stilgar, his wife Harah, and Princess Irulan flee with Leto II and Ghanima to escape Alia's worsening tyranny. Though married to Duncan Idaho, Alia takes Fremen warrior Buer Agarves as a lover, promising him leadership of Sietch Tabr in return for killing Stilgar. In the clandestine Sietch Fondak, Gurney Halleck follows what he believes are Jessica's orders, and with the help of Fremen Namri administers an overdose of melange to Leto II as a test of his resistance to the danger of Abomination that has taken Alia. Alia, however, is actually behind the plan, and Namri has secretly been instructed by her to kill Leto no matter the result. Leto recognizes a potential mate in the Fondak woman Sabiha, but recognizes this as an alternate path he should not take. A blind preacher emerges from the desert, guided by teenage Assan Tariq, son of Muriz from a cast out tribe of Fremen.

By God Emperor of Dune (1981), taking place 3,500 years after Children of Dune, Arrakis has become terraformed into a wet, lush planet. The desert was now limited to the area surrounding Leto II's fortress, and all sandworms other than the God Emperor have died off, thus altering the Fremen culture drastically. Traditions and rituals held by ancient Fremen were maintained and performed by "Museum Fremen", though they had lost all their meaning and value. Many Fremen had moved to other planets during Muad'Dib's jihad and in centuries afterward were absorbed into other societies, but by the end of Leto II's reign the Fremen as a distinct culture had ceased to exist.

In Heretics of Dune (1984), 1,500 years after the events of God Emperor of Dune and the fall of Leto II, Arrakis (now called Rakis) had once again reverted to a desert planet. The local population adopted some similar customs to the ancient Fremen to live in the desert environment but with little real continuity. By this time the planet was dominated by the Rakian Priesthood, descendants of the Fish Speakers and before them Muad'Dib's Qizarate priesthood, who continue to worship Leto II as the "Divided God". The Rakian Priesthood are considered a brutal and ignorant lot by all the major galactic powers, a nuisance to be dealt with but not an actual political player. As the renegade off-shoot of the Bene Gesserit known as the Honored Matres are returning to the galaxy to invade the territories of the old Imperium, events on Rakis snap into focus when a young girl named Sheanna displays the ability to command the sandworms after one destroys her village. The Rakian Priesthood fixate on Sheanna, attracting the attention of the Bene Gesserit (who determine that Sheanna is a distant descendant of Siona Atreides, and thus through her Paul Atreides). This sets in motion a chain of events that leads the Honored Matres to destroy all life on Rakis through orbital bombardment, save for Sheanna and a handful of others who escape with the Bene Gesserit (along with a surviving sandworm, to begin a new spice cycle on another planet).

== Characteristics ==
In the series, the "native" Fremen of Arrakis live in communities called sietches ("Sietch Tabr" combines the Ukrainian Cossack words sich and tabor or "wagon fort"), each with its own leader, called a naib, who has ascended to the position by challenging his predecessor and proving himself the strongest in the tribe. The Fremen system of justice relies primarily on trial by combat, and individuals may challenge each other hand-to-hand duels to the death over matters of etiquette, law, or honor. The victor of these challenges becomes responsible for the wife, children, and certain possessions of the defeated. The Fremen pay enormous spice bribes to the Spacing Guild to keep orbital space above Arrakis free of spy satellites, and they have a long-term plan to terraform the planet.

Each sietch also has a Sayyadina, a wise woman trained in the spiritual traditions of her people who can serve as a spiritual leader or as an acolyte to a holy woman who is the Fremen version of a Bene Gesserit Reverend Mother. A significant part of the Fremen mythology has been created by the Bene Gesserit Missionaria Protectiva, an arm of the matriarchy which practices "religious engineering" by introducing contrived myths, prophecies and superstition among the populations of the Empire with the intent to later exploit them to the advantage of an individual Bene Gesserit or the entire order. In the case of the Fremen, a messiah legend has been put in place that is utilized in Dune by Paul Atreides to secure the safety of himself and his mother Jessica. The Fremen have a language unique to them, but also use Chakobsa for ritual purposes.

The Fremen worship the giant sandworms of Arrakis as manifestations of the earth deity they call Shai'Hulud. Though they cross the desert on foot in a specifically nonrhythmic pattern to avoid vibrations that would attract the deadly and destructive creatures, the Fremen are also able to ride the worms by "calling" and mounting them in a ritualized, controlled manner. As part of the sandworm life cycle, the spice drug melange is everywhere on Arrakis, and the Fremen diet is rich with it. Such a level of exposure to the spice tints the sclera, cornea and iris of the user to a dark shade of blue, called "blue-in-blue" or "the Eyes of Ibad".

=== Water conservation ===
Herbert illustrates that living in the desert with no natural sources of water has spurred the Fremen to ritualize and build their society around the collection, storage, and conservative use of all moisture. They conserve the water distilled from their dead, consider spitting a sign of respect, and put a great cultural reverence on tears. Water is collected from the atmosphere in windtraps that condense the humidity and add it to underground water stores in each sietch. Water can also be collected from dead people and animals using a deathstill to remove the water from a corpse for addition to the sietch water store. Personal ownership of moisture is designated by "water rings", which are used as a form of currency. When outside of their sietch, Fremen wear a stillsuit, a special body-enclosing suit designed to collect and recycle all the moisture the body releases through perspiration, urine, feces, and even the exhalation of water vapor in the breath. The special fabric is a micro-sandwich designed to dissipate heat and filter wastes while reclaiming moisture. The water is then held in catchpockets and made available to drink through a tube. A Fremen in a well-kept suit can survive weeks in the desert without any other source of water. Herbert even suggests in Dune that the Fremen have adapted to the environment physiologically, with their blood able to clot almost instantly in order to prevent water loss.

=== Combat ===
A crysknife from Frank Herbert's Dune (2000)

The dangerous conditions of Arrakis, which ensure that only the strongest survive, have also forged the Fremen into superior hand-to-hand combatants. In Dune, Paul trains his Fremen forces in the use of the "weirding way", the Fremen name for the specialized Bene Gesserit martial arts that he learned from his mother. The Mentat assassin Thufir Hawat is later shocked to learn that Fremen have not only overcome some of Shaddam IV's fierce and previously unstoppable Sardaukar soldiers, but have done the impossible and captured some as well. Herbert also writes that "Paul recalled the stories of the Fremen—that their children fought as ferociously as the adults." In the novel Shaddam notes, "I only sent in five troop carriers with a light attack force to pick up prisoners for questioning. We barely got away with three prisoners and one carrier. Mind you, Baron, my Sardaukar were almost overwhelmed by a force composed mostly of women, children, and old men."

In Herbert's fictional universe, personal body shields have made all forms of projectile weapons semi-obsolete. Only a slow-moving weapon can penetrate a shield, putting knives and similar weapons in common use. The beam of energy weapons called lasguns react violently with a shield, creating an unpredictable explosion comparable to sub-atomic fusion which can kill the attacker, shield wearer, and surrounding individuals. Fremen do not use shields because they also attract the native giant sandworms of Arrakis and drive them into a killing frenzy. As a result, the Fremen have the advantage of not being trained to slow their knives when attacking, as those battling a shielded opponent do. Fremen use different archaic weapons such as maula pistols, lances and crossbows to great effect, but the most deadly and prized possession of a Fremen warrior is the crysknife. A crysknife is a personally-tuned blade ground from the crystal tooth of a sandworm, and is the formal and sacred weapon of the Fremen. It is a milk-white, double-edged curved knife, the blade about 20 centimetres (8 in) long. The crysknife comes in two forms, fixed and unfixed. Unfixed knives need to be stored in proximity to an electrical field produced by the human body or they will disintegrate after a period of time. Fixed crysknives are put through chemical processes to keep them permanently intact. In Children of Dune, Leto II notes that "The crysknife dissolves at the death of its owner." All young Fremen must go through a ritual confirming their adulthood, which is sealed with the gift of a crysknife to the adolescent warrior. According to the religious beliefs of the Fremen, a drawn crysknife must not be sheathed until it draws blood. The Fremen also forbid outsiders from possessing crysknives, and in Dune the Lady Jessica refers to "the fabled crysknife of Arrakis, the blade that had never been taken off the planet, and was known only by rumor and wild gossip." When the Shadout Mapes gives one to Jessica, the Fremen woman warns, "Who sees that knife must be cleansed or slain!"

== In the Dune games ==
The Fremen have been featured in the Dune series of games, playing a vital role in the plots of nearly all of them. The first Dune game (1992) and Frank Herbert's Dune (2001) are tied closely to the original book by Frank Herbert, retelling Paul Muad'Dib's rise to becoming the Fremen's Messiah, and leading them against the Harkonnens and the Padishah Emperor under the Atreides banner. In Dune II (1992) and Dune 2000 (1998), the Fremen are special Atreides units, native elite guerrillas invoked from the Palace. In Emperor: Battle for Dune (2001) they are one of the five sub-factions.
