= The Illustrated Dune =

1978 edition of Dune by Frank Herbert

- First edition cover
- Author: Frank Herbert
- Illustrator: John Schoenherr
- Cover artist: John Schoenherr
- Language: English
- Series: Dune series
- Genre: Science fiction
- Published: August 1978
- Publisher: Berkley Windhaven
- Publication place: United States
- Media type: Print (softcover)
- Pages: 533
- ISBN: 0425038912

The Illustrated Dune is the 1978 edition of Dune by Frank Herbert, published by Berkley Books and most known for its drawings and paintings by artist John Schoenherr. Schoenherr began creating art for the Dune series beginning with the cover art for the first edition of the debut book and by illustrating the Analog serializations of Dune World (December 1963 - February 1964), the five-part Prophet of Dune (January-May, 1965), and Children of Dune (1976); Schoenherr won a Hugo Award for Best Professional Artist for his Dune artwork.

The edition includes 33 black-and-white sketch drawings and eight full color paintings, which were received positively by Herbert though the author did not speak to Schoenherr until after all the artwork was finished. Herbert said, "I can envision no more perfect visual representation of my Dune world than John Schoenherr’s careful and accurate illustrations," and that Schoenherr was the "only man who has ever visited Dune."
