= Sandworm (Dune) =

Fictional extraterrestrial creature

- Dune franchise element
- Sheeana Brugh and a sandworm from the cover of Heretics of Dune (1984), artwork by John Schoenherr
- First appearance: Dune; 1965
- Created by: Frank Herbert
- Genre: Science fiction

In-universe information
- Type: Creature
- Traits and abilities: Aggressive, territorial and destructive, attracted by rhythmic sounds, and driven into a killing frenzy by Holtzman shields

A sandworm is a fictional extraterrestrial creature that appears in the Dune novels written by Frank Herbert, first introduced in Dune (1965).

Sandworms are colossal, worm-like creatures that live on the desert planet Arrakis. Their larvae produce a drug called melange (known colloquially as "the spice"), the most essential and valuable commodity in the universe because it makes safe and accurate interstellar travel possible. Melange deposits are found in the sand seas of Arrakis, where the sandworms live and hunt, and harvesting the spice from the sand is a dangerous activity because sandworms are aggressive and territorial. Harvesting vehicles must be airlifted in and out of the sand sea in order to evade sandworm attacks. The struggle over the production and supply of melange is a central theme of the Dune saga. The sandworms are reverently called Shai-Hulud by the planet's indigenous Fremen, who worship them as agents of God whose actions are a form of divine intervention. The name is derived from the Arabic شيء خلود (šayʾ khulūd, "thing of immortality").

== Conception ==
One of the earliest illustrations of a sandworm, by John Schoenherr (Analog, January 1965)

The sandworms in Dune were inspired by the dragons of European mythology that guard some sort of treasure. In particular, Herbert referred to the dragon in Beowulf that guards a hoard of gold in a cave, and the dragon of Colchis that guards the Golden Fleece from Jason. Like these dragons, the sandworms of Arrakis will attack anyone who attempts to take the treasure that is spice from the desert sands, as if they were guarding it. In Children of Dune (1976), a character even refers to sandworms as "the dragon on the floor of the desert." However, in the story, the sandworms are merely territorial and have no use for the spice, which is in fact waste matter produced by their larvae.

In the plot of Frank Herbert's novel Dune, Herbert used the sandworms (along with the spice they produce) as a plot device to provide Paul Atreides with the trials through which he ascends to a superhuman state of being. Herbert believed that a memorable myth must have something profoundly moving that could either empower the hero or overwhelm him completely. The force in question must be dangerous and terrifying, yet somehow essential. In Dune, the sandworms serve this function. To earn the spice, humans must cope with sandworm attacks on their harvesting expeditions. To earn an even greater prize (his apotheosis into the all-seeing Kwisatz Haderach), Paul undergoes even more dangerous and transformative trials in which he risks madness and death, one of which involves the ritual sacrifice of a juvenile sandworm, and another in which he must learn to ride a sandworm.

The elements of any mythology must grow from something profoundly moving, something which threatens to overwhelm any consciousness which tries to confront the primal mystery. Yet, after the primal confrontation, the roots of this threat must appear as familiar and necessary as your own flesh. For this, I give you the sandworms of Dune ... the extension of human lifespan cannot be an unmitigated blessing. Every such acquisition requires a new consciousness. And a new consciousness assumes that you will confront dangerous unknowns—you will go into the deeps.

— Frank Herbert, 1977

Sandworms are attracted to rhythmic vibrations in the sand, which they mistake for prey (smaller sandworms). To escape the notice of the sandworms, a traveller in the desert must learn to "walk without rhythm" in a manner that simulates the natural sounds of the desert. This element comes from Frank Herbert's experiences as a hunter and fisherman. He knew how to mask his presence from prey by techniques such as approaching from downwind and treading lightly. Frank Herbert's son Brian explained that "In Children of Dune, Leto II allowed sandtrout to attach themselves to his body, and this was based in part upon my father's own experiences as a boy growing up in Washington state, when he rolled up his trousers and waded into a stream or lake, permitting leeches to attach themselves to his legs."

John Schoenherr provided the earliest artwork for the Dune series, including the illustrations in the initial pulp magazine serial and the cover of the first hardcover edition. Frank Herbert was very pleased with Schoenherr's art, and remarked that he was "the only man who has ever visited Dune". Schoenherr gave the sandworm three triangular lobes that form the lips of its mouth. This design was referenced for the sandworm puppets that appeared in the 1984 movie adaptation of Dune.

== Description ==
Sandworms are giant creatures found only on the desert planet Arrakis. They are reverently called "Shai-Hulud" by the planet's indigenous Fremen, who worship them as agents of God whose actions are a form of divine intervention. The Fremen also refer to the sandworms as "Makers".

=== Physiology ===
Herbert describes sandworms as colossal terrestrial annelids with features of the lamprey. They have an array of crystalline teeth which are used primarily for rasping rocks and sand. During his first close encounter with a sandworm in Dune, Paul notes, "Its mouth was some eighty meters in diameter ... crystal teeth with the curved shape of crysknives glinting around the rim ... the bellows breath of cinnamon, subtle aldehydes ... acids ..."

Sandworms grow to hundreds of meters in length, with specimens observed over 400 metres (1,300 ft) long and 40 metres (130 ft) in diameter, although Paul becomes a sandrider by summoning a worm that "appeared to be" around half a league (1.5 miles (2.4 km)) or more in length. These gigantic worms burrow deep in the ground and travel swiftly; "most of the sand on Arrakis is credited to sandworm action".

Sandworms are described as "incredibly tough" by Liet-Kynes, who further notes that "high-voltage electrical shock applied separately to each ring segment" is the only known way to kill and preserve them; atomics are the only explosive powerful enough to kill an entire worm, with conventional explosives being unfeasible as "each ring segment has a life of its own". Water is poisonous to the worms, but it is in too short supply on Arrakis to be of use against any but the smallest of them.

=== Life cycle ===
The sandworms of Herbert's Dune have a self-contained lifecycle and ecosystem with a feeding mechanism similar to how baleen whales feed on plankton. They move through the desert sands and ingest large quantities of melange pockets to consume the microscopic organisms known as "sand plankton" that inhabit it. These plankton eat melange which itself is a byproduct of dying sandworms. When consuming a melange mass, a sandworm excretes a more refined form of the melange as well as dispersing it across the desert environment, all this sustaining further plankton growth.

The "larval" stage of a sandworm are shown to be called "sandtrout", which the Fremen call "Little Makers". They are described as "flat and leathery" in Children of Dune, with Leto II noting that they are "roughly diamond-shaped" with "no head, no extremities, no eyes" and "coarse interlacings of extruded cilia". They can find water unerringly, and squeezing the sandtrout yields a "sweet green syrup". When water is flooded into the sandtrout's excretions, a pre-spice mass is formed; at this "stage of fungusoid wild growth", gases are produced which result in "a characteristic 'blow', exchanging the material from deep underground for the matter on the surface above it". After exposure to sun and air, this mass becomes melange.

While sandworms are capable of eating humans, the latter do contain a level of water beyond the preferred tolerances of the worms. They routinely devour melange-harvesting equipment—mistaking the mechanical rhythm for prey or a rival worm—but they seem to derive actual nutrition only from sand plankton and smaller sandworms, and have no actual interest in the spice. Sandworms will also not attack sandtrout.

Imperial Planetologist Pardot Kynes (father of Liet Kynes) had discovered the sandtrout during his ecological investigations of the planet, deducing their existence before he actually found one. Kynes determines that they block off water "into fertile pockets within the porous lower strata below the 280° (absolute) line", and Alia Atreides notes in Children of Dune that the "sandtrout, when linked edge to edge against the planet's bedrock, formed living cisterns". The Fremen themselves protect their water supplies with "predator fish" that attack invading sandtrout. Sandtrout can be lured by small traces of water, and Fremen children catch and play with them; smoothing one over the hand forms a "living glove" until the creature is repelled by something in the "blood's water" and falls off.

Kynes' "water stealers" die "by the millions in each spice blow" and may be killed by even a "five-degree change in temperature". He notes that "the few survivors entered a semi-dormant cyst-hibernation to emerge in six years as small (about three meters long) sandworms". A small number of these then emerge into maturity as giant sandworms, to whom water is poisonous. A "stunted worm" is a "primitive form ... that reaches a length of only about nine meters". Their drowning by the Fremen makes them expel the awareness-spectrum narcotic known as the Water of Life.

Leto II says in Children of Dune:

The sandtrout ... was introduced here from some other place. This was a wet planet then. They proliferated beyond the capability of existing ecosystems to deal with them. Sandtrout encysted the available free water, made this a desert planet ... and they did it to survive. In a planet sufficiently dry, they could move to their sandworm phase.

=== Behavior and function ===
In Dune, the desert of Arrakis is the only known source of the spice melange, the most essential and valuable commodity in the universe. Used as a drug, melange lengthens life span, increases vitality, and heightens awareness. It can also unlock prescience in some subjects, which makes safe and accurate interstellar travel possible. The harvesting of melange is therefore essential, but is also a highly dangerous undertaking due to the presence of sandworms. Rhythmic activity as minimal as normal walking on the desert surface of Arrakis attracts the territorial worms, which are capable of swallowing even the largest mining equipment whole. They are an accepted obstacle to spice mining, as any attempt to exterminate them would be prohibitively expensive, if not entirely futile. Harvesting is done by a gigantic machine called a Harvester, which is carried to and from a spice blow by a larger craft called a Carryall. The Harvester on the ground has four scouting ornithopters patrolling around it watching for wormsign, the motions of sand which indicate that a worm is coming. Melange is collected from the open sand until a worm is close, at which time the Carryall lifts the Harvester to safety. The Fremen, who base their entire industry around the sale of spice and the manufacture of materials out of spice, have learned to co-exist with the sandworms in the desert and harvest the spice manually for their own use and for smuggling off-planet.

Due to their size and territorial nature, sandworms can be extremely dangerous, even to Fremen. The worms are attracted to—and maddened by—the presence of Holtzman force fields used as personal defense shields, and as a result these shields are of little use on Arrakis. In Children of Dune it is noted that a weapon has been developed on Arrakis called a "pseudo-shield". This device will attract and enrage any nearby sandworm, which will destroy anything in its vicinity. The Fremen manage to develop a unique relationship with the sandworms. They learn to avoid most worm attacks by mimicking the motions of desert animals, moving with the natural sounds of the desert rather than rhythmic vibrations. However, they also develop a device known as a thumper with the express purpose of generating a rhythmic vibration to attract a sandworm. This can be used either as a diversion or to summon a worm to ride.

The Fremen have secretly mastered a way to ride sandworms across the desert. First, a worm is lured by the vibrations of a thumper device. When it surfaces, the lead worm-rider runs alongside it and snares one of its ring-segments with a special "maker hook". The hook is used to pry open the segment, exposing the soft inner tissue to the abrasive sand. To avoid irritation, the worm will rotate its body so the exposed flesh faces upwards, lifting the rider with it. Other Fremen may then plant additional hooks for steering, or act as "beaters", hitting the worm's tail to make it increase speed. A worm can be ridden for several hundred kilometers and for about half a day, at which point it will become exhausted and sit on the open desert until the hooks are released, whereupon it will burrow back down to rest. Worm-riding is used as a coming-of-age ritual among the Fremen, and Paul's riding and controlling a giant sandworm cements him as a Fremen leader. Paul also uses worms for troop transport into the city during the Battle of Arrakeen after using atomic weapons to blow a hole in the Shield Wall. After the reign of Leto II, sandworms become un-rideable. The one exception is a young girl named Sheeana, an Atreides descendant who possesses a unique ability to control the worms and safely move around them.

Fremen also use the sharp teeth of dead sandworms to produce the sacred knives they call crysknives. Approximately 20 centimetres (8 in) long, these hand-to-hand weapons are either "fixed" or "unfixed". An unfixed knife requires proximity to a human body's electrical field to prevent its eventual disintegration, while fixed knives are treated for storage. Fremen tradition dictates that once a crysknife is drawn, it must not be sheathed until it has drawn blood.

== Storylines ==
=== Original series ===
By the time of the events of Dune (1965), humans have been harvesting melange from Arrakis for several thousand years. The indigenous Fremen regard the sandworms as divine, but to everyone else, they are just deadly pests. Few people understand the sandworms' connection to the spice. This is no longer the case by the time of Children of Dune (1976), and numerous groups attempt to smuggle sandworms off Arrakis and transplant them to other planets so as to break the Atreides' monopoly on spice production.

In Children of Dune, Leto II consumes massive amounts of spice and allows many sandtrout to cover his body, the concentration of spice in his blood fooling them. This layer gives Leto tremendous strength, speed, and protection from mature sandworms, which mistake his sandtrout-covered body for a lethal mass of water. He calls it a "living, self-repairing stillsuit of a sandtrout membrane", and soon notes that he is "no longer human".

Gradually over the next 3,500 years, Leto not only survives, but also is transformed into a hybrid of human and giant sandworm. By the time of God Emperor of Dune (1981), he has exterminated all other sandworms, and his own transformation has modified his component sandtrout. When Leto allows himself to be assassinated, the sandtrout release themselves to begin the sandworm lifecycle anew; subsequent offspring are tougher and more adaptable than their predecessors, allowing them to ultimately be more easily settled on other worlds, thus ensuring the survival of the sandworm species. Each one, according to Leto, carries in it a tiny pearl of his consciousness, trapped forever in an unending prescient dream.

Over the next 1500 years, Arrakis (now called Rakis) is returned to a desert by the thriving sandworm cycle. Bene Gesserit Mother Superior Taraza becomes aware in Heretics of Dune (1984) that humanity is being limited by the prescient dream of Leto, and controlled by him through his worm remnants. She engineers the destruction of Rakis by the Honored Matres to free humanity, leaving one remaining worm to start the cycle anew. Taraza is killed; her successor Darwi Odrade takes the worm to Chapterhouse. She submerges it in a spice bath to generate sandtrout, with the goal of terraforming their own planet Chapterhouse into another Dune, and later doing the same on other planets, with new worms and infinite potential for gathering spice.

=== Prequels and sequels ===
In the Prelude to Dune prequel trilogy by Brian Herbert and Kevin J. Anderson (1999–2004), the Tleilaxu initiate Project Amal, an early attempt to create synthetic melange to eliminate dependence upon Arrakis. They are fundamentally unaware, however, that melange production is part of the sandworm lifecycle, and the project is an abysmal failure.

In Sandworms of Dune, Brian Herbert and Anderson's 2007 conclusion to the original series, the Spacing Guild is manipulated into replacing its Navigators with Ixian navigation devices and cutting off the Navigators' supply of melange. Sure to die should they be without the spice, a group of Navigators commissions Waff, an imperfectly awakened Tleilaxu ghola, to create "advanced" sandworms able to produce the melange they so desperately require. He accomplishes this by altering the DNA of the sandtrout stage and creating an aquatic form of the worms, which are then released into the oceans of Buzzell. Adapting to their new environment, these seaworms quickly flourish, eventually producing a highly concentrated form of spice, dubbed "ultraspice". Meanwhile, sandworms are revealed to have survived the devastation of Rakis after all, by burrowing deep under the surface.

== In adaptations ==
=== Dune (1984) ===
In the 1984 David Lynch film Dune, the sandworms were designed by special effects modeler Carlo Rambaldi for a budgeted $2 million. Rambaldi had previously created the titular alien for the 1982 film E.T. the Extra-Terrestrial. The blue screen constructed for Dune's special effects was thirty-five feet (11 m) high and 108 feet (33 m) wide, the largest at that time. The sandworms were achieved using practical effect models, miniature sets and blue screens. Several scales of sandworm models were created, operated by "worm wranglers" and pulled with cables to simulate motion. The largest models, which were approximately 20 feet (7 m) long, allowed for wranglers to open the worms' mouths and crane their bodies up and down and from side to side. The smaller versions were used for other movements, and for background action.

Critics were generally not impressed with the film's effects. Roger Ebert called Lynch's sandworms "striking", but noted, "the movie's special effects don't stand up to scrutiny. The heads of the sand worms begin to look more and more as if they came out of the same factory that produced Kermit the Frog (they have the same mouths)." Entertainment Weekly's Sandra P. Angulo called the sandworms "embarrassingly phallic looking". Daniel D. Snyder of The Atlantic was impressed by the "gargantuan" appearance of the sandworms thanks to the "staggering sense of scale" achieved by the miniature sets created by Emilio Ruiz del Río. Though panning the film overall, Janet Maslin of The New York Times noted the "nice worm-fight at the end of the story." Hoai-Tran Bui of /Film noted that "the popular image of the sandworm comes from David Lynch's 1984 film, which depicted the massive creatures as fleshy, phallic-looking monsters."

=== Dune (2000) and Children of Dune (2003) ===
The 2000 Sci Fi Channel miniseries Frank Herbert's Dune, and the 2003 sequel miniseries Frank Herbert's Children of Dune, employed computer-generated visual effects to create sandworms onscreen, under the guidance of special effects supervisor Ernest Farino.

Critics praised the visual effects in both miniseries, each of which won a Primetime Emmy Award for Outstanding Special Visual Effects for a Miniseries, Movie or a Special. Deborah D. McAdams of Broadcasting & Cable suggested that the images of "gigantic computer-generated sandworms munching down huge machines and people like popcorn" contributed to the 2000 miniseries' record-breaking ratings.

=== Dune (2021) and Dune: Part Two (2024) ===
A sandworm from the 2021 film Dune

Regarding his 2021 film Dune, director Denis Villeneuve said:

I kept saying to Patrice Vermette, my production designer, "I want the worm to be like a prehistoric creature, something that has been living and evolving for 100,000 years." We needed a beast that can survive a harsh and brutal environment. We were thinking about how thick the skin should be, how the mouth should close to travel in the sand. But more important, we were talking about, how does it feed? We had the idea that it would be a bit like a whale: It would need some kind of filter system to be able to capture nutrients in the sand—this idea of the baleen ... It's an anatomic detail that's very grounded in the world and in the ecosystem. And it also allowed me to create this idea that when you look into a worm's mouth, it looks like an eye. It has this feeling of the presence of a god.

VFX production supervisor Paul Lambert explained, "We spent more time working out the animation around the worm than the worm itself [with its large mouth and teeth]. You see the destruction that it creates. We spent time trying to find references of how sand can be displaced so we could copy that."

=== Video games ===
Besides film and television adaptations, the Dune franchise has been adapted into a series of computer and video games in which sandworms play a part.

Sandworms are a featured element in the 1992 real-time strategy video game Dune II: The Building of a Dynasty, primarily as destroyers of the player's spice Harvesters, assault tanks, and other equipment. In the game, sandworms are computer-controlled forces that lie dormant under the sand until either player- or computer-controlled units come within range, and they will attack indiscriminately. The sandworms can be damaged or destroyed by sonic blasts, a Death Hand explosion, a detonated Spice Bloom, or a self-destructing Devastator, and will disappear when they have been destroyed, reduced to half health, or have eaten three units. Sandworms do not appear until the third missions, and there may be two or three in play at once.

Sandworms also appear in Dune 2000 (1998). They behave somewhat differently than in the previous game, and are present from the first mission. Sandworms will disappear temporarily after devouring five vehicles, but eventually return.

Emperor: Battle for Dune (2001) features gameplay on four planets, and sandworms are a hazard on Arrakis. Players must also destroy a genetically engineered "Emperor Worm" to complete the game.

In Dune: Awakening (2025), sandworms are a persistent environmental threat, and any players crossing open sand on the ground will attract the attention of nearby sandworms. Like the novels, they are fiercely territorial and are attracted to any vibrations on the sand in the areas they patrol, with the threat level rising for stronger vibrations (eg, driving a ground vehicle will trigger the sandworm threat level much faster than walking across open sand). The threat level is indicated by a vibration meter on the bottom of the screen which shows how much attention a player's vibrations are drawing, with colors representing the degree of threat: white/yellow being low priority, orange as medium and red warning that a sandworm is close. The red display on the meter is usually closely followed by a warning breach above the sands by the nearby sandworm, indicating that the player has a very short grace period to make it to safety before the sandworm begins charging. While players normally will not lose any of their progress when they are defeated, being devoured by a sandworm will cause almost every carried item to be lost, including gear and equipment and any nearby vehicles on the ground.

== Merchandising ==
A line of Dune action figures from toy company LJN was released to lackluster sales in 1984. Styled after David Lynch's film, the collection included a poseable sandworm. Revell also produced a model kit of a sandworm complete with figures representing Fremen riders. For the 2024 release of Denis Villeneuve's Dune: Part Two, AMC Theatres introduced a popcorn bucket with the likeness of the giant sandworm, featuring a lid with flexible plastic "teeth" that appear to consume the moviegoer's hand as they reach in. The bucket was satirized by Saturday Night Live and on social media.

== Impact and analysis ==
The sandworms have been called "iconic" to the franchise, and "synonymous with the Dune series", having appeared in nearly every novel, on several book covers, and in all of the television, film, and video game adaptations. Hoai-Tran Bui of /Film noted that they are an "essential to the narrative of the story", and Lindsey Romain of Nerdist deemed the creatures "extremely important to the plot and the very fiber of the Dune universe." Bella Ross of Screen Rant called the sandworms "the embodiment of the perils of colonization."

William Touponce suggests that Herbert's depiction of larval sandworms (or sandtrout), which hold back water in the desert to maintain the arid conditions their sandworm vector requires to thrive, is "an analogy for a stage of consciousness [Paul's sister] Alia can feel. Some of the ancestral voices within her mind hold back dangerous forces that could destroy her." Touponce also describes "the archetypal terrors of confronting Shai-Hulud, the giant sandworm guarding the treasure".

Sibylle Hechtel analyzes the concept of sandworms in the essay "The Biology of the Sandworm" in The Science of Dune (2008).

The American metalcore band Shai Hulud, founded in 1995, takes their name from the sandworms of the Dune franchise.

A hacker group responsible for several major cyberattacks in the 2010s named itself Sandworm, in reference to the fictional organism.

In August 2023, University of Kansas paleontologist Rhiannon LaVine named a newly-discovered, 500-million-year-old marine polychaete worm Shaihuludia shurikeni after Herbert's fictional sandworms.

== See also ==
- Graboid
- Mongolian death worm

== Bibliography ==
- Brian Herbert (2003). Dreamer of Dune: The Biography of Frank Herbert. Macmillan. ISBN 9781429958448.
- Tim O'Reilly, ed. (1987). The Maker of Dune: Thoughts of a Science Fiction Master. Berkley Books. ISBN 0425097854.
