= Poverty grass =

Poverty grass is a common name for several plants and may refer to:

- Any of several grasses that grow in poor or sandy soil, for example:
  - Aristida dichotoma, Shinner's three-awn
  - Eremochloa bimaculata
  - Sporobolus vaginiflorus, sheathed dropseed
  - Danthonia spicata, poverty oatgrass
- Any of several plants in the genus Hudsonia that grow up on beaches
- During the Dust Bowl period of The Great Depression, struggling farmers in Oklahoma referred to certain fluffy-headed grasses as "poverty grass". Those grasses had very little nutrition value to offer their stock, but would keep them from their noisy complaining if allowed to graze on them when there were no nutritious grasses to eat.
