= Desert planet =

Rocky planet whose surface is dominated by desert

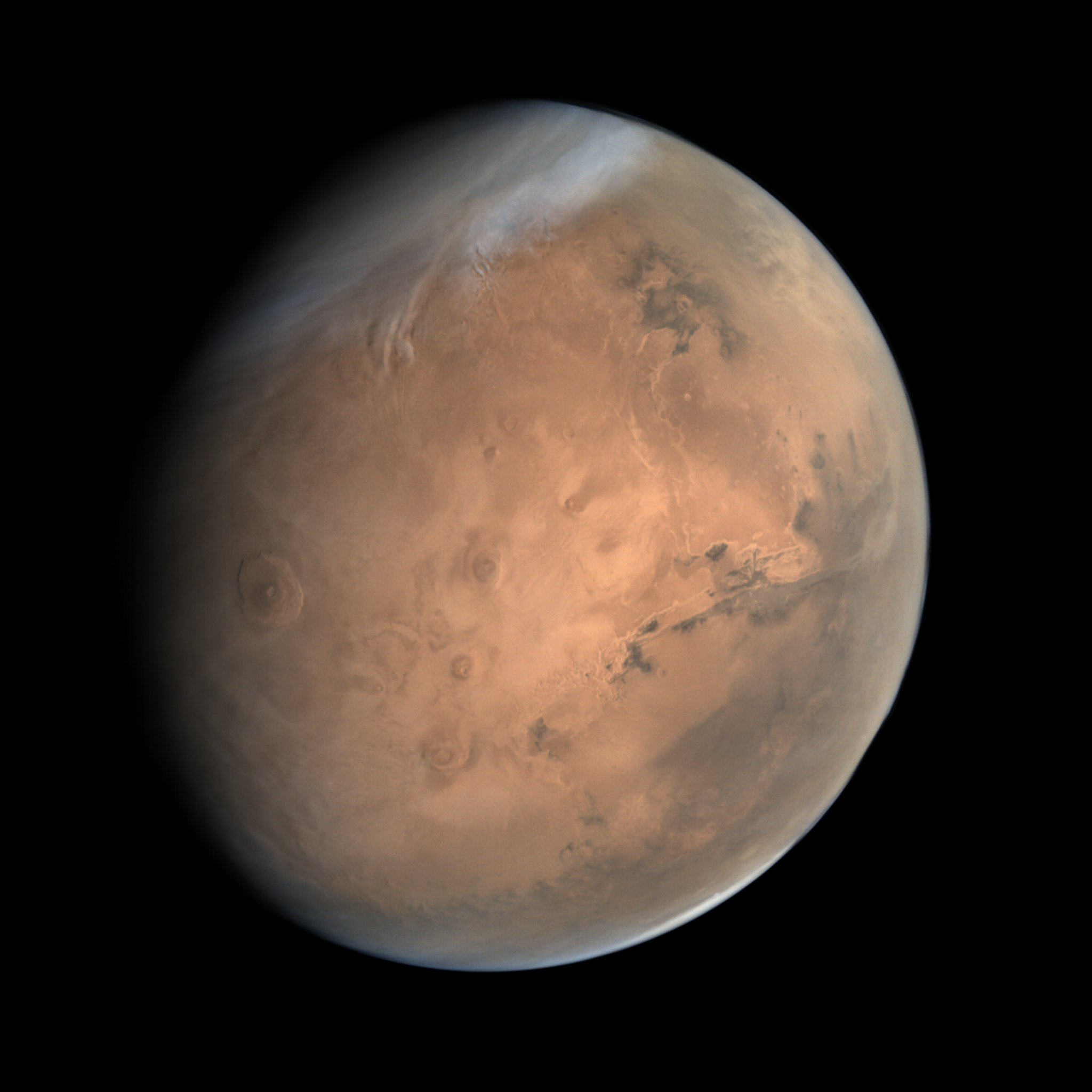
Mars, an example of a cold desert planet, seen by the Mars Orbiter Mission space probe

A desert planet, also known as a dry planet, an arid planet, or a dune planet, is a type of terrestrial planet that is arid at the surface level.

Deserts can be cold or hot, and even retain water, like Antarctica or the Sahara on Earth; however, desert planets are arid across their entire surface. Mars is a prominent example of a (cold) desert planet with a tenuous atmosphere.

But also other arid planets with atmospheres more as well as less dense have been identified as desert planets, like Venus and Mercury.

== Habitability ==
A 2011 study suggested that not only are life-sustaining desert planets possible, but that they might be more common than Earth-like planets. The study found that, when modeled, desert planets had a much larger habitable zone than ocean planets. The same study also speculated that Venus may have once been a habitable desert planet as recently as 1 billion years ago. It is also predicted that Earth will become a desert planet within a billion years due to the Sun's increasing luminosity.

A study conducted in 2013 concluded that hot desert planets without runaway greenhouse effect can exist in 0.5 AU around Sun-like stars. In that study, it was concluded that a minimum humidity of 1% is needed to wash off carbon dioxide from the atmosphere, but too much water can act as a greenhouse gas itself. Higher atmospheric pressures increase the range in which water can remain liquid.

In a 2026 study, computer calculations show that arid terrestrial planets may have unbalanced geologic carbon cycles due to runoff-limits to weathering, which can lead to a loss of habitability and runaway warming. (Note: The Carbon cycle can be keept in planets with enough liquid surface water: atmospheric CO2 dissolves in rain to form carbonic acid, such acid reacts with continental silicate rocks, trapping so the carbon. This cycle is balanced by feedback: as more atmospheric CO2 is accumulated by volcanic outgassing, temperatures increase by its greenhouse effect, increasing also water evaporation and rain, which draw down the CO2 excess. If the carbon cycle is unbalanced it can accumlate freely in the atmosphere, so that high temperatures will evaporate all water (then solar photodissociation breaks de atomic bounds of H2O resulting in hydrogen escape and final loss of water inventories).) Even if a given planet is in the Habitable Zone (HZ), it can transition to an uninhabitable state if it does not have enough initial surface water to balance outgassing and weathering fluxes. So a planet with less than 10% Earth's oceans (as comparison half of the Atlantic Ocean), couldn't keep a balanced carbon cycle, entering in a runaway warming state, being unlikely to be habitable. The minimum threshold of surface water required to maintain a balanced carbon cycle would be around 0.2–0.5 Earth’s oceans by mass.

== Science fiction ==
The concept has become a common setting in science fiction, appearing as early as the 1956 film Forbidden Planet and Frank Herbert's 1965 novel Dune. The environment of the desert planet Arrakis (also known as Dune) in the Dune franchise drew inspiration from the Middle East, particularly the Arabian Peninsula and Persian Gulf, as well as Mexico. Dune in turn inspired the desert planets which prominently appear in the Star Wars franchise, including the planets Tatooine, Geonosis, and Jakku.

== See also ==
- Exoplanet
- Ocean world
