= Jane Yolen bibliography =

List of works by or about fantasy writer Jane Yolen:

== Novels ==
- Trust a City Kid (1966, with Anne Huston)
- The Wizard of Washington Square (1969)
- The Inway Investigators, or, The Mystery at McCracken's Place (1970)
- The Magic Three of Solatia (1974)
- The Transfigured Hart (1975)
- The Mermaid's Three Wisdoms (1978)
- The Gift of Sarah Barker (1981)
- The River Maid (1981)
- Children of the Wolf (1984)
- The Stone Silenus (1984)
- Cards of Grief (1985, Mythopoeic Fantasy Award for Adult Literature)
- The Devil's Arithmetic (1988, Nebula Award finalist; basis of the 1999 film of the same name)
- The Dragon's Boy (1990)
- Wizard's Hall (1991, illustrated by Trina Schart Hyman)
- Briar Rose (1992, Mythopoeic Fantasy Award for Adult Literature, Nebula Award finalist)
- The Wild Hunt (1995)
- Armageddon Summer (1998, with Bruce Coville, ALA Best Book for Young Adults, ALA Quick Pick for Reluctant Young Adult Readers)
- Sword of the Rightful King (2003, ALA Best Books 2004, ALA Best Books for Young Adults 2004, ALA Top 10 Fantasy Books for Youth 2004)
- Except the Queen (2010, with Midori Snyder)
- Snow in Summer (2011)
- Curse of the Thirteenth Fairy (2012)
- B.U.G. (Big Ugly Guy) (2013, with Adam Stemple)
- Bad Girls: Sirens, Jezebels, Murderesses, Thieves, and Other Female Villains (2013, with Heidi E. Y. Stemple and illustrated by Rebecca Guay)
- A Plague of Unicorns (2014)
- Centaur Rising (2014)
- Trash Mountain (2015)
- Mapping the Bones (2018)
- Finding Baba Yaga (2018)
- Schlemiel Comes to America (2023)

The Pit Dragon Chronicles

1. Dragon's Blood (1982)
2. Heart's Blood (1984)
3. A Sending of Dragons (1987)
4. Dragon's Heart (2009)

Great Alta

1. Sister Light, Sister Dark (1988, Nebula Award finalist)
2. White Jenna (1989, Nebula Award finalist)
3. The One-Armed Queen (1998)

The Young Merlin Trilogy (Mythopoeic Fantasy Award for Children's Literature)

1. Passager (1996)
2. Hobby (1996)
3. Merlin (1997)

Tartan Magic

1. The Wizard's Map (1999)
2. The Pictish Child (1999)
3. The Bagpiper's Ghost (2002)

The Stuart Quartet (with Robert J. Harris)

1. Queen's Own Fool (2000), based on the life of Nichola, a jester at the court of Mary, Queen of Scots
2. Girl in a Cage (2002), based on the life of Marjorie Bruce
3. Prince Across the Water (2004)
4. The Rogues (2007)

Young Heroes (with Robert J. Harris)

- Odysseus in the Serpent Maze (2001)
- Hippolyta and the Curse of the Amazons (2001)
- Atalanta and the Arcadian Beast (2003)
- Jason and the Gorgon's Blood (2004)

Rock 'n' Roll Fairy Tales (with Adam Stemple)

- Boots and the Seven Leaguers (2000)
- Pay the Piper (2005, Locus Award for Best Young Adult Novel)
- The Troll Bridge (2007)

The Seelie Wars (with Adam Stemple)

- The Hostage Prince (2013)
- The Last Changeling (2014)
- The Seelie King's War (2016)

== Short fiction ==
Collections

- The Wizard Islands (1973, illustrated by Robert Quackenbush)
- The Girl Who Cried Flowers and Other Tales (1974)
- The Moon Ribbon and Other Tales (1976)
- The Hundredth Dove and Other Tales (1977)
- Dream Weaver (1979)
- Neptune Rising: Songs and Tales of the Undersea People (1982)
- Tales of Wonder (1983)
- The Whitethorn Wood and Other Magicks (1984)
- Dragonfield and Other Stories (1985)
- Merlin's Booke (1986)
- Tales of Wonder (1987, for adults)
- The Faery Flag (1989)
- Storyteller (1992)
- Twelve Impossible Things Before Breakfast (1997)
- Sister Emily's Lightship and Other Stories (2000)
- The Fish Prince and Other Stories: Mermen Folk Tales (2001, with Shulamith Levey Oppenheim)
- Once Upon a Time (She Said) (2005)
- The Last Selchie Child (2012)
- Grumbles from the Forest: Fairy-Tale Voices with a Twist (2013, with Rebecca Kai Dotlich)
- The Bloody Tide (2014)
- The Emerald Circus (2017)
- How to Fracture a Fairy Tale (2017, stories and poems)
- The Midnight Circus (2020)
- The Scarlet Circus (2023)

Here There Be... illustrated by David Wilgus

- Here There Be Dragons (1993)
- Here There Be Unicorns (1994)
- Here There Be Witches (1995)
- Here There Be Angels (1996)
- Here There Be Ghosts (1998)

Stories (Note: Short stories unless otherwise noted.)

Title	Year	First published	Reprinted/collected	Notes
Sister Emily's Lightship	1997	Starlight 1		Short story; Nebula Award winner
Lost Girls	1998	Twelve Impossible Things Before Breakfast		Novelette; Nebula Award winner
The Jewel in the Toad Queen's Crown	2013	Queen Victoria's Book of Spells		available online

== Children's books and picture books ==
=== Fiction picture books ===
- The Witch Who Wasn't (1964, illustrated by Arnold Roth)
- Gwinellen: The Princess Who Could Not Sleep (1965, illustrated by Ed Renfro)
- The Emperor and the Kite (1967, illustrated by Ed Young; Caldecott Medal winner, 1968)
- Isabel's Noel (1967, illustrated by Arnold Roth)
- The Minstrel and the Mountain: A Tale of Peace (1968, illustrated by Anne Rockwell)
- The Longest Name on the Block (1968, illustrated by Peter Madden)
- It All Depends (1969, illustrated by Don Bolognese)
- The Seventh Mandarin (1970, illustrated by Ed Young)
- The Bird of Time (1971, illustrated by Mercer Mayer)
- Rainbow Rider (1974, illustrated by Michael Foreman)
- The Boy Who Had Wings (1974, illustrated by Helga Aichinger)
- The Little Spotted Fish (1974, illustrated by Friso Henstra)
- An Invitation To The Butterfly Ball (1976, illustrated by Jane Breskin Zalben)
- Milkweed Days (1976, photos by Gabriel Amadeus Cooney)
- The Seeing Stick (1977, illustrated by Daniela Jaglenka Terrazzini)
- The Sultan's Perfect Tree (1977, illustrated by Barbara Garrison)
- The Simple Prince (1978, illustrated by Jack Kent)
- No Bath Tonight (1978, illustrated by Nancy Winslow Parker)
- All in the Woodland Early: An ABC Book (1978, illustrated by Jane Breskin Zalben)
- The Giants Go Camping (1979, illustrated by Tomie dePaola)
- The Giants' Farm (1979, illustrated by Tomie dePaola)
- The Robot and Rebecca: Mystery of the Code-Carrying Kids (1980, illustrated by Jurg Obrist)
- Mice on Ice (1980, illustrated by Lawrence Di Fiori)
- Dragon Night and Other Lullabies (1980, illustrated by Demi)
- The Robot, Rebecca, and the Missing Owser (1981, illustrated by Lady McCrady)
- Sleeping Ugly (1981, illustrated by Diane Stanley)
- Uncle Lemon's Spring (1981, illustrated by Glen Rounds)
- Shirlick Holmes and the Case of the Wandering Wardrobe (1981, illustrated by Anthony Rao)
- The Boy Who Spoke Chimp (1981, illustrated by David Wiesner)
- The Acorn Quest (1981, illustrated by Susanna Natti)
- Brothers of the Wind (1981, illustrated by Barbara Berger)
- The Sleeping Beauty (1986, illustrated by Ruth Sanderson)
- The Girl Who Loved the Wind (1987, illustrated by Ed Young; Lewis Carroll Shelf Award)
- Owl Moon (1987, illustrated by John Schoenherr; Caldecott Medal winner, 1988)
- Dove Isabeau (1989, illustrated by Dennis Nolan)
- Tam Lin (1990, illustrated by Charles Mikolaycak)
- Elfabet: An ABC of Elves (1990, illustrated by Lauren A. Mills)
- Sky Dogs (1990, illustrated by Barry Moser)
- Dinosaur Dances (1990, illustrated by Bruce Degan)
- All Those Secrets of the World (1991, illustrated by Leslie Baker)
- Hark! A Christmas Sampler (1991, with Tomie dePaola)
- Greyling (1991, illustrated by William Stobbs)
- Wings (1991, illustrated by Dennis Nolan)
- Letting Swift River Go (1992, illustrated by Barbara Cooney)
- Eeny, Meeny, Miney Mole (1992, illustrated by Kathryn Brown)
- Welcome to the Green House (1993, illustrated by Laura Regan)
- Too Old for Naps (1993, illustrated by Alexi Natchev)
- Honkers (1993, illustrated by Leslie Baker)
- Mouse's Birthday (1993, illustrated by Bruce Degen)
- The Girl in the Golden Bower (1994, illustrated by Jane Dyer)
- Beneath the Ghost Moon (1994, illustrated by Laurel Molk)
- Good Griselle (1994, illustrated by David Christiana)
- Before the Storm (1994, illustrated by Georgia Pugh)
- Grandad Bill's Song (1994, illustrated by Melissa Bay Mathis)
- Old Dame Counterpane (1994, illustrated by Ruth Tietjen Councell)
- The Ballad of the Pirate Queens (1995, illustrated by David Shannon)
- Alphabestiary (1995, illustrated by Allan Eitzen)
- Merlin and the Dragons (1995, illustrated by Li Ming, based on film Merlin and the Dragons)
- A Sip of Aesop (1995, illustrated by Karen Barbour)
- And Twelve Chinese Acrobats (1995, illustrated by Jean Gralley)
- Little Mouse & Elephant: A Tale from Turkey (1995, illustrated by John Segal)
- Musicians of Bremen: A Tale from Germany (1995, illustrated by John Segal)
- Encounter (1996, picture book illustrated by David Shannon)
- Meet the Monsters (1996, with Heidi E. Y. Stemple; illustrated by Patricia Ludlow)
- Miz Berlin Walks (1997, illustrated by Floyd Cooper)
- Nocturne (1997, illustrated by Anne Hunter)
- Once Upon a Bedtime Story (1997, illustrated by Ruth Tietjen Councell)
- Pegasus, the Flying Horse (1998, illustrated by Li Ming)
- Welcome to the Ice House (1998, illustrated by Laura Regan)
- The Prince of Egypt (1998, illustrated by Michael Köelsch)
- The Sea Man (1998, illustrated by Christopher Denise)
- King Long Shanks (1998, illustrated by Victoria Chess)
- Raising Yoder's Barn (1998, illustrations by Bernie Fuchs)
- MoonBall (1999, illustrated by Greg Couch)
- Where Have the Unicorns Gone? (2000, illustrated by Ruth Sanderson)
- Off We Go! (2000, illustrated by Laurel Molk)
- The Flying Witch (2003, illustrated by Vladimir Vagin)
- The Firebird (2002, illustrated by Vladimir Vagin)
- Harvest Home (2002, illustrated by Greg Shed)
- The Sea King (2002, with Shulamith Levey Oppenheim; illustrated by Stefan Czernecki)
- Time for Naps (2002, illustrated by Hiroe Nakata)
- Hoptoad (2003, illustrated by Karen Lee Schmidt)
- Child of Faerie, Child of Earth (2005, illustrated by Jane Dyer)
- Grandma's Hurrying Child (2005, illustrated by Kay Charao)
- Soft House (2005, illustrated by Wendy Anderson Halperin)
- Dimity Duck (2006, illustrated by Sebastien Braun)
- Sleep, Black Bear, Sleep (2007, with Heidi E. Y. Stemple; illustrated by Brooke Dyer)
- Naming Liberty (2008, illustrated by Jim Burke)
- One Hippo Hops (2008, illustrated by Vlasta van Kampen)
- Sad, Mad, Glad Hippos (2008, illustrated by Vlasta van Kampen)
- Hip Hippos (2008, illustrated by Vlasta van Kampen)
- Mama's Kiss (2008, illustrated by Daniel Baxter)
- Pumpkin Baby (2009, illustrated by Susan Mitchell)
- The Scarecrow's Dance (2009, illustrated by Bagram Ibatoulline)
- My Uncle Emily (2009, illustrated by Nancy Carpenter)
- Come to the Fairies' Ball (2009, illustrated by Gary Lippincott)
- Under the Star: A Christmas Counting Story (2009, illustrated by Vlasta van Kampen)
- Elsie's Bird (2010, illustrated by David Small)
- Hush, Little Horsie (2010, illustrated by Ruth Sanderson)
- My Father Knows the Names of Things (2010, illustrated by Stéphane Jorisch)
- Creepy Monsters, Sleepy Monsters (2011, illustrated by Kelly Murphy)
- The Day Tiger Rose Said Goodbye (2011, illustrated by Jim LaMarche)
- Pretty Princess Pig (2011, with Heidi E. Y. Stemple; illustrated by Sam Williams)
- Sister Bear: A Norse Tale (2011, illustrated by Linda Graves)
- Waking Dragons (2012, illustrated by Derek Anderson)
- Romping Monsters, Stomping Monsters (2013, illustrated by Kelly Murphy)
- The Stranded Whale (2015, illustrated by Melanie Cataldo)
- Stone Angel (2015, illustrated by Katie May Green), OCLC 852681833
- You Nest Here with Me (2015, with Heidi E. Y. Stemple; illustrated by Melissa Sweet)
- Sing a Season Song (2015, illustrated by Lisa Ashlock)
- What To Do With a Box (2016, illustrated by Chris Sheban)
- On Bird Hill (2016, illustrated by Bob Marstall)
- On Duck Pond (2017, illustrated by Bob Marstall)
- Thunder Underground (2017, illustrated by Josée Masse)
- On Gull Beach (2018, illustrated by Bob Marstall)
- Crow Not Crow (2018, illustrated by Elizabeth Dulemba)
- A Bear Sat on My Porch Today (2018, illustrated by Rilla Alexander)
- Monster Academy (2018, with Heidi E. Y. Stemple; illustrated by John McKinley)
- Miriam at the River (2020, illustrated by Khoa Le)
- Kiki Kicks (2023, with Ariel Stemple; illustrated by John Ledda)

Commander Toad

- Commander Toad in Space (1980)
- Commander Toad and the Planet of the Grapes (1982)
- Commander Toad and the Big Black Hole (1983)
- Commander Toad and the Dis-asteroid (1985)
- Commander Toad and the Intergalactic Spy (1986)
- Commander Toad and the Space Pirates (1987)
- Commander Toad and the Voyage Home (1998)

Piggins (illustrated by Jane Dyer)

- Piggins (1987)
- Picnic with Piggins (1988)
- Piggins and the Royal Wedding (1989)

How Do Dinosaurs...? (illustrated by Mark Teague)

- How Do Dinosaurs Say Good Night? (2000)
- How Do Dinosaurs Get Well Soon? (2002)
- How Do Dinosaurs Learn to Read? (2003)
- How Do Dinosaurs Clean Their Rooms? (2004)
- How Do Dinosaurs Count to Ten? (2004)
- How Do Dinosaurs Eat Their Food? (2005)
- How Do Dinosaurs Play with Their Friends? (2006)
- How Do Dinosaurs Learn Their Colors? (2006)
- How Do Dinosaurs Go to School? (2007)
- How Do Dinosaurs Say I Love You? (2009)
- How Do Dinosaurs Learn Colours and Numbers? (2009)
- How Do Dinosaurs Love Their Cats? (2010)
- How Do Dinosaurs Love Their Dogs? (2010)
- How Do Dinosaurs Laugh Out Loud? (2010)
- How Do Dinosaurs Say Happy Birthday? (2011)
- How Do Dinosaurs Go Up and Down? (2011)
- How Do Dinosaurs Play All Day? (2011)
- How Do Dinosaurs Say Merry Christmas? (2012)
- How Do Dinosaurs Say Happy Chanukah? (2012)
- How Do Dinosaurs Eat Cookies? (2012)
- How Do Dinosaurs Say I'm Mad? (2013)
- How Do Dinosaurs Stay Safe? (2013)
- How Do Dinosaurs Stay Friends? (2016)
- How Do Dinosaurs Choose Their Pets? (2016)

Baby Bear (illustrated by Melissa Sweet)

- Baby Bear's Bedtime Book (1990)
- Baby Bear's Chairs (2005)
- Baby Bear's Books (2006)
- Baby Bear's Big Dreams (2007)

Little Frog

- Little Frog and the Scary Autumn Thing (2016, illustrated by Ellen Shi)
- Little Frog and the Spring Polliwogs (2017, illustrated by Ellen Shi)

=== Story collections ===
- Spider Jane (1978, illustrated by Stefan Bernath)
- Ring of Earth: A Child's Book of Seasons (1986, illustrated by John Wallner)
- Milk and Honey: A Year of Jewish Holidays (1996, illustrated by Louise August)
- The Fairies' Ring: A Book of Fairy Stories & Poems (1999, illustrated by Stephen Mackey)
- Not One Damsel In Distress: World Folktales for Strong Girls (2000, illustrated by Susan Guevara)
- Mightier Than the Sword: World Folktales for Strong Boys (2003, illustrated by Raúl Colón)
- The Barefoot Book of Ballet Stories (2004, with Heidi E. Y. Stemple; illustrated by Rebecca Guay)
- Meow: Cat Stories from Around the World (2005, illustrated by Hala Wittwer)
- The Barefoot Book of Dance Stories (2010, with Heidi E. Y. Stemple; illustrated by Helen Cann)
- Animal Stories: Heartwarming True Tales from the Animal Kingdom (2014, with Heidi E. Y. Stemple, Adam Stemple, and Jason Stemple; illustrated by Jui Ishida)
- Once There Was a Story: Tales from Around the World, Perfect for Sharing (2017, illustrated by Jane Dyer)
- Meet Me at the Well: The Girls and Women of the Bible (2018, with Barbara Diamond Goldin; illustrated by Vali Mintzi)

=== Songbooks ===
- The Fireside Song Book of Birds and Beasts (1972, musical arrangement by Barbara Green; illustrated by Peter Parnall)
- Rounds about Rounds (1977, music arrangement by Barbara Green; illustrated by Gail Gibbons)
- The Lullaby Songbook (1986, music arrangement by Adam Stemple; illustrated by Charles Mikolaycak)
- The Lap-Time Song and Play Book (1989, music arrangement by Adam Stemple; illustrated by Margot Tomes)
- Jane Yolen's Mother Goose Songbook (1992, music arrangement by Adam Stemple; illustrated by Rosekrans Hoffman)
- Jane Yolen's Songs Of Summer (1993, music arrangement by Adam Stemple; illustrated by Cyd Moore)
- Jane Yolen's Old Macdonald Songbook (1994, music arrangement by Adam Stemple; illustrated by Rosekrans Hoffman)
- Apple for the Teacher: Thirty Songs for Singing While You Work (2005, music arrangement by Adam Stemple)

=== Literary cookbooks ===
- Fairy Tale Feasts (2006, recipes by Heidi E. Y. Stemple; illustrations by Philippe Béha)
- Fairy Tale Breakfasts (2009, recipes by Heidi E.Y. Stemple; illustrations by Philippe Béha)
- Fairy Tale Lunches (2009, recipes by Heidi E. Y. Stemple; illustrations by Philippe Béha)
- Fairy Tale Dinners (2009, recipes by Heidi E. Y. Stemple; illustrations by Philippe Béha)
- Fairy Tale Desserts (2009, recipes by Heidi E. Y. Stemple; illustrations by Philippe Béha)
- Jewish Fairy Tale Feasts (2013, recipes by Heidi E. Y. Stemple; illustrations by Sima Elizabeth Shefrin)

=== Nonfiction picture books ===
- Ring Out! A Book of Bells (1974, illustrated by Richard Cuffari)
- World on a String: The Story of Kites (1975)
- Simple Gifts: The Story of the Shakers (1976, illustrated by Betty Fraser)
- A Letter from Phoenix Farm (1992, photos by Jason Stemple)
- Welcome to the Sea of Sand (1996, illustrated by Laura Regan)
- Tea with an Old Dragon: A Story of Sophia Smith, Found of Smith College (1998, illustrated by Monica Vachula)
- House, House (1998, photos by the Howes Brothers and Jason Stemple)
- Welcome to the River of Grass (2001, illustrated by Laura Regan)
- My Brothers' Flying Machine: Wilbur, Orville, and Me (2003, illustrated by Jim Burke)
- The Perfect Wizard: Hans Christian Andersen (2005, illustrated by Dennis Nolan)
- Johnny Appleseed: The Legend and the Truth (2008, illustrated by Jim Burke)
- Lost Boy: The Story of the Man Who Created Peter Pan (2010, illustrated by Steve Adams)
- All Star!: Honus Wagner and the Most Famous Baseball Card Ever (2010, illustrated by Jim Burke)
- The Emily Sonnets: The Life of Emily Dickinson (2012, illustrated by Gary Kelley)
- Smout and the Lighthouse (2023, with John Patrick Pazdziora, illustrated by Lyndsay Roberts Rayne)

An Unsolved Mystery from History (with Heidi E.Y. Stemple; illustrated by Roger Roth)

- The Mary Celeste (1999)
- The Wolf Girls (2001)
- Roanoke, the Lost Colony (2003)
- The Salem Witch Trials (2004)

== Poetry ==
Collections

- Yolen, Jane (1987). The three bears rhyme book. Illustrated by Jane Dyer. San Diego: Harcourt Brace Jovanovich.
- Best Witches: Poems for Halloween (1989, illustrated by Elise Primavera)
- What Rhymes with Moon? (1993, illustrated by Ruth Tietjen Councell)
- Raining Cats and Dogs (1993, illustrated by Janet Street)
- How Beastly! (1994, illustrated by James Marshall)
- Animal Fare (1994, illustrated by Janet Street)
- Water Music: Poems for Children (1995, photos by Jason Stemple)
- Sacred Places (1996, illustrations by David Shannon)
- Snow, Snow: Winter Poems for Children (1998, photos by Jason Stemple)
- The Originals: Animals that Time Forgot (1998, illustrated by Ted Lewin)
- Bird Watch (1990, illustrated by Ted Lewin)
- O Jerusalem: Voices of a Sacred City (1996, illustrated by John Thompson)
- Sea Watch (1996, illustrated by Ted Lewin)
- Color Me a Rhyme: Nature Poems for Young People (2000, photos by Jason Stemple)
- Dear Mother, Dear Daughter: Poems for Young People (2001, with Heidi E.Y. Stemple; illustrated by Gil Ashby)
- Wild Wings: Poems for Young People (2002, with Jason Stemple. National Outdoor Book Award (Children's Category))
- Horizons: Poems as Far as the Eye Can See (2002, photos by Jason Stemple)
- The Radiation Sonnets (2003)
- Least Things: Poems about Small Natures (2003, photos by Jason Stemple)
- Fine Feathered Friends (2004, photos by Jason Stemple)
- Count Me a Rhyme: Animal Poems by the Numbers (2006, photos by Jason Stemple)
- Shape Me a Rhyme: Nature's Forms in Poetry (2007, photos by Jason Stemple)
- A Mirror to Nature: Poems About Reflection (2009, photos by Jason Stemple)
- An Egret's Day (2010, photos by Jason Stemple)
- Things to Say to a Dead Man: Poems at the End of a Marriage and After (2011)
- Bird of a Feather (2011, photos by Jason Stemple)
- Bug Off! Creepy, Crawly Poems (2012, photos by Jason Stemple)
- The Last Selchie Child (2012)
- Ekaterinoslav: One Family's Passage to America: A Memoir in Verse (2012)
- Sister Fox’s Field Guide to the Writing Life (2013)
- Grumbles from the Forest: Fairy-Tale Voices with a Twist (2013, with Rebecca Kai Dotlich; illustrated by Matt Mahurin)
- The Bloody Tide: Poems about Politics and Power (2012)
- Grumbles from the Town: Mother-Goose Voices with a Twist (2016, with Rebecca Kai Dotlich; illustrated by Angela Matteson)
- The Alligator's Smile, and Other Poems (2016, photos by Jason Stemple)
- How to Fracture a Fairy Tale (2017, stories and poems)
- Before the Vote After (2017)
- Fly with Me: A Celebration of Birds Through Pictures, Poems, and Stories (2018, with Heidi E.Y. Stemple, Adam Stemple, and Jason Stemple)
- In and Out the Window (2024, illustrated by Cathrin Peterslund)

Anthologies edited

- Street Rhymes Around the World (1992)
- Weather Report (1993, illustrated by Annie Gusman)
- Sleep Rhymes Around the World (1994)
- Mother Earth Father Sky: Poems of Our Planet (1995, illustrated by Jennifer Hewitson)
- Sky Scrape/City Scape: Poems of City Life (1996, illustrated by Ken Condon)
- Once Upon Ice: And Other Frozen Poems (1997, photos by Jason Stemple)

Individual poems

Title	Year	First published	Reprinted/collected	Notes
Angels fly because they take themselves lightly	1991	Yolen, Jane (December 1991). "Angels fly because they take themselves lightly". Asimov's Science Fiction. 15 (14).		1991 Asimov's Science Fiction Readers' Award, poetry.
Call of the Wild	2014	Yolen, Jane (December 2014). "Call of the Wild". Asimov's Science Fiction. 38 (12): 53.		
Fiddler at midnight	2014	Yolen, Jane (October–November 2014). "Fiddler at midnight". Asimov's Science Fiction. 38 (10–11): 149.		
Perhaps	2015	Yolen, Jane (February 2015). "Perhaps". Asimov's Science Fiction. 39 (2): 71.		
Prince/glass	2015	Yolen, Jane (March 2015). "Prince/glass". Asimov's Science Fiction. 39 (3): 67.		
South of Oz	2014	Yolen, Jane (June 2014). "South of Oz". Asimov's Science Fiction. 38 (6): 79.		
Telling the true	2013	Yolen, Jane (August 2013). "Telling the true". Asimov's Science Fiction. 37 (8): 55.		
Tintagel morning : song	1990	Yolen, Jane (April 1990). "Tintagel morning : song". Asimov's Science Fiction. 14 (4).		
What a time traveler needs most	2014	Yolen, Jane (March 2014). "What a time traveler needs most". Asimov's Science Fiction. 38 (3): 24.		
Will	1992	Yolen, Jane (Spring 1992). "Will". The Magazine of Speculative Poetry.		Also published as a broadside by A Midsummer Night's Press; 1993 Rhysling Award winner.

- "Lies" (Paradox, Issue 8, Winter 2005–2006)
- "War Memorial: Edinburgh" (Paradox, Issue 8, Winter 2005–2006)
- "Fife Map" (Paradox, Issue 9, Summer 2006)
- "Suzy and Leah"
- "Fat Is Not a Fairy Tale" (Find in Poetry 180)
- "Smallpox" and "A Story Must Be Held", Sarah LeFanu and Stephen Hayward (eds), Colours of a New Day: Writing for South Africa (London: Lawrence & Wishart, 1990), pp. 145–146
- "Portrait of the Book As Golem" (Tor.com 2013)

== Graphic novels ==
- The Last Dragon (2011, adapted from the short story "Dragonfield" [1985] and illustrated by Rebecca Guay)
- Foiled (2010, illustrated by Mike Cavallaro)
- Curses! Foiled Again (2013, illustrated by Mike Cavallaro)
- The Stone Man Mysteries (with Adam Stemple; illustrated by Orion Zangara)
  1. Stone Cold (2016)
  2. Sanctuary (2018)

== Screenplays ==
- Merlin and the Dragons (1991, story by Yolen, animation based on illustrations by Alan Lee)

== As editor ==
=== Fiction ===
- Zoo 2000: Twelve Stories of Science Fiction and Fantasy Beasts (1973)
- Favorite Folktales From Around the World (1986, winner of the World Fantasy Award)
- Spaceships & Spells: A Collection Of New Fantasy And Science Fiction Stories (1987, with Martin H. Greenberg and Charles G. Waugh)
- Werewolves (1988, with Martin H. Greenberg)
- Things That Go Bump in the Night (1989, with Martin H. Greenberg)
- Vampires (1991, with Martin H. Greenberg)
- Xanadu (1992, with Martin H. Greenberg)
- Xanadu 2 (1993, with Martin H. Greenberg)
- Xanadu 3 (1994, with Martin H. Greenberg)
- 2041: Twelve Short Stories About the Future by Top Science Fiction Writers (1994, with Connie Willis and Anne McCaffrey)
- Camelot: A Collection of Original Arthurian Stories (1995, illustrated by Winslow Pels)
- Gray Heroes: Elder Tales from Around the World (1999)
- Sherwood: Original Stories from the World of Robin Hood (2000)
- Mirror, Mirror: Forty Folk Tales for Mothers and Daughters to Share (2000, with Heidi E.Y. Stemple)
- Year's Best Science Fiction and Fantasy for Teens (2005, with Patrick Nielsen Hayden)
- Nebula Awards Showcase 2018 (2018)

== Nonfiction ==
- Writing Books for Children (1973)
- Friend: The Story of George Fox and the Quakers (1979)
- Touch Magic: Fantasy, Faerie and Folklore in the Literature of Childhood (1981)
- Take Joy: A Writer's Guide to Loving the Craft (2003)
- Sea Queens: Women Pirates Around the World (2008, illustrated by Christine Joy Pratt)
