= Carle Honors =

The Carle Honors are annual awards given by the Eric Carle Museum of Picture Book Art to individuals and organizations in the picture book field for their dedication and creative vision. They are named in honor of the American author and illustration of children's picture books Eric Carle.

== Categories of honorees ==
There are four categories of honoree:

- Artist Honoree - for an exceptional picture book creator
- Angel Honoree - for an individual who has supported and advocated for picture book writers and artists
- Bridge Honoree - presented to individuals who have taken innovative approaches to expanding picture book readership
- Mentor Honoree - presented to editors, educators, and designers

== Carle Honorees ==
=== 1st Carle Honorees – 2006 ===
- Artist: Rosemary Wells
- Angel: Helen Bing
- Bridge: Morton Schindel
- Mentor: Ann Beneduce
- Presenters: Jane Bayard Curley and Leonard S. Marcus

=== 2nd Carle Honorees – 2007 ===
- Artist: Ashley Bryan
- Angel: Martin Pope and Lillie Pope
- Bridge: Twila Liggett
- Mentor: Margaret McElderry
- Presenters: Jane Bayard Curley and Leonard S. Marcus

=== 3rd Carle Honorees – 2008 ===
- Artist: Maurice Sendak
- Angel: Jim Oelschlager and Vanita Oelschlager
- Bridge: Jim Trelease
- Mentor: Susan Hirschman

=== 4th Carle Honorees – 2009 ===
- Artist: Alice Provensen
- Angel: Kyle Zimmer
- Bridge: Blouke Carus and Marianne Carus
- Mentor: Walter Lorraine
- Co-Chairs: Jon Scieszka and Jamie Lee Curtis

=== 5th Carle Honorees – 2010 ===
- Artist: David Macaulay
- Angel: Allan Daniel and Kendra Daniel
- Bridge: Nancy Schon
- Mentor: Stephen Mooser & Lin Oliver
- Co-Chairs: Les Charles and Zora Charles and Chris Van Allsburg and Lisa Van Allsburg

=== 6th Carle Honorees – 2011 ===
- Artist: Lois Ehlert
- Angel: Jeanne Steig
- Bridge: Karen Nelson Hoyle
- Mentor: Michael Di Capua
- Co-Chairs: Jerry Pinkney and Gloria Jean Pinkney and Maurice Sendak

=== 7th Carle Honorees – 2012 ===
- Artist: Lane Smith
- Angel: Kent L. Brown, Jr.
- Bridge: Christopher Cerf
- Mentor: Frances Foster
- Co-Chairs: Jules Feiffer, Kate Feiffer, and Norton Juster and Jeanne Juster

=== 8th Carle Honorees – 2013 ===
- Artist: Chris Van Allsburg
- Angel: Lynda Johnson Robb and Carol Rasco
- Mentor: Phyllis Fogelman Baker
- Bridge: Barbara Bader
- Co-Chairs: Tony DiTerlizzi and Angela DiTerlizzi

=== 9th Carle Honorees – 2014 ===
- Artist:Jerry Pinkney
- Angel: Reach Out and Read, represented by Brian Gallagher and Dr. Perri Klass
- Mentor: Dr. Henrietta Mays Smith
- Bridge: Françoise Mouly
- Presenters: Tony DiTerlizzi and Angela DiTerlizzi

=== 10th Carle Honorees – 2015 ===
- Artist: Helen Oxenbury
- Angel: The Cotsen Children's Library at Princeton University, represented by Corinna Cotsen and Andrea Immel
- Mentor: Neal Porter
- Bridge: Joan Bertin, executive director of the National Coalition Against Censorship (NCAC)
- Presenter: David Macaulay

=== 11th Carle Honorees – 2016 ===
- Artist: Allen Say
- Angel: Lee & Low Books, represented by Jason Low
- Mentor: Regina Hayes
- Bridge: Steven Heller
- Presenter: Gregory Maguire

=== 12th Carle Honorees – 2017 ===
- Artist: Ed Young
- Angel: Dr. John Y. Cole
- Mentor: Bank Street Writers Lab, represented by Chairperson Dr. Cynthia Weill
- Bridge: Anthea Bell
- Presenter: Jack Gantos

=== 13th Carle Honorees – 2018 ===
- Artist: Paul O. Zelinsky, illustrator
- Angel: The Sendak Fellowship & Workshop, represented by Lynn Caponera and Dona Ann McAdams
- Mentor: Dr. Rudine Sims Bishop
- Bridge: The Bologna Children's Book Fair, represented by Elena Pasoli
- Host: Andrea Davis Pinkney

=== 14th Carle Honorees – 2019 ===
- Artist: Melissa Sweet, author-illustrator
- Angel: REFORMA, the National Association to Promote Library and Information Services to Latinos and the Spanish Speaking
- Mentor: David Saylor, VP and Creative Director of Scholastic; founder and publisher of Graphix
- Bridge: Takeshi Matsumoto, founder of the Chihiro Art Museum in Japan

=== 15th Carle Honorees – 2021 ===
- Artist: Raúl Colón
- Angel: Every Child a Reader, represented by Carl Lennertz
- Mentor: Patricia Aldana
- Bridge: Dennis M. V. David and Justin G. Schiller

=== 16th Carle Honorees – 2022 ===
- Artist: Faith Ringgold, painter, teacher and author
- Angel: Dolly Parton’s Imagination Library
- Mentor: Wade Hudson and Cheryl Hudson, authors, publishers and champions for diversity equity and inclusion
- Bridge: Ajia, translator, author, promoter of picture books

=== 17th Carle Honorees - 2024 ===
- Artist: Uri Shulevitz
- Angel: We Need Diverse Books
- Mentor: Horn Book
- Bridge: KidLit TV
- Inspiration: Marlo Thomas
