= Ed Young (illustrator) =

Chinese-born American children's illustrator (1931–2023)

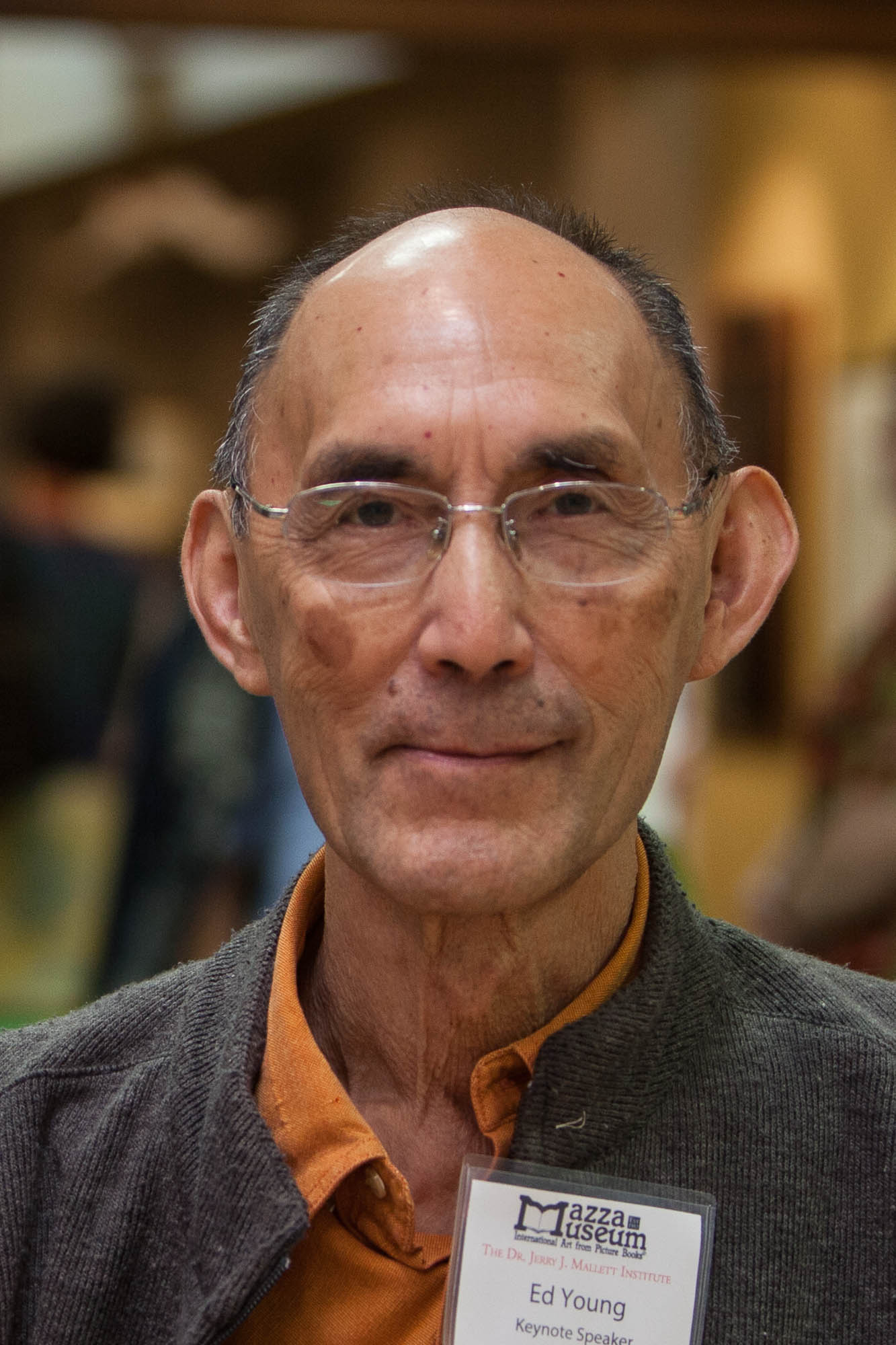
- Young at the Mazza Museum 2013 conference
- Born: Young Tse-chun; November 28, 1931; Tianjin, China
- Died: September 29, 2023 (aged 91); Hastings-on-Hudson, New York, U.S.
- Occupations: Illustrator, writer, tai chi teacher
- Writing career
- Period: 1962–2023
- Genre: Children's picture books
- Notable awards: Caldecott Medal; 1990; Carle Honors 2017

Ed Tse-chun Young (Chinese: 杨志成; pinyin: Yáng Zhìchéng; November 28, 1931 – September 29, 2023) was a Chinese-born American illustrator and writer of children's picture books and tai chi instructor. He received many awards and recognitions, including the Caldecott Medal and lifetime achievement awards for his contributions as a children's illustrator.

== Biography ==
Young was born in Tianjin, China. When he was three years old, he and his family moved to Shanghai. From an early age, Ed loved to create stories and draw sketches.

He moved to the U.S. in 1951 to study architecture, but grew more interested in art and switched his major. His first job was with a New York advertising agency where he spent his lunch breaks sketching animals at the Central Park Zoo. He died at his home in Hastings-on-Hudson, New York aged 91.

== Work ==
Young's first book, The Mean Mouse and Other Mean Stories, was published by Harper & Row in 1962. He expected it to be his first and last book, but it won an American Institute of Graphic Arts award and launched his career. He is known for his use of colours and images to convey hidden symbolism, and for his use of mixed media: pencil, pastel, cut paper, collage, ink, photographs, light and shadows, and found materials.

The subject and style of each story provide Young with the initial inspiration for his art. Young based his work on research, believing a strong foundation of credibility must be established in order to create new and exciting images.

Young won the 1990 Caldecott Medal for illustrating Lon Po Po, his version of a Red-Riding Hood story from China. This annual award from the American Library Association recognizes the previous year's "most distinguished American picture book for children". Young had previously been a runner-up twice (two Honor Books), for The Emperor and the Kite and Seven Blind Mice. For his lifetime contribution as a children's illustrator, he was U.S. nominee in both 1992 and 2000 for the biennial, international Hans Christian Andersen Award. In 2016, Young was honoured with Lifetime Achievement Awards from the Eric Carle Museum and the Society of Illustrators. In 2020 he received a Chen Bochui Children's Literature Award as Best Author of the Year.

== Exhibits ==
Young's original art for his books has been the subject of many exhibits such as "Journey Without End" at the National Center for Children's Illustrated Literature in Abilene, Texas (2011–2012). He participated in many group shows such as the Michaelson Gallery's Children's Illustration Celebration and the Eric Carle Museum. A major retrospective of his work "Ed Young's Bright Worlds" was mounted in 2026 at the Museum of Chinese in America in New York City.

== Tai chi ==
In 1964, Young met the renowned tai chi master, Cheng Man-ch'ing. He became one of Cheng's top disciples in America, and was one of his two principal translators. Sent by Cheng, Young began teaching tai chi in Hastings-on-Hudson in 1971. Young taught tai chi for over four decades in his hometown and other venues such as Yale University and Naropa University, and workshops around the United States.

== Awards and honors ==
Young received over fifty awards and honors for his work, among them:

- Caldecott Medal: Lon Po Po: A Red Riding Hood Story from China 1990
- Caldecott Honor: The Emperor and the Kite 1967
- Caldecott Honor: Seven Blind Mice 1992
- Hans Christian Andersen Award U.S. nominee 1992 and 2000
- Mazza Medallion of Excellence for Artistic Diversity: 2002
- Boston Globe–Horn Book Award - Nonfiction: The Double Life of Pocahontas 1984
- Boston Globe–Horn Book Award - Picture book: Seven Blind Mice 1992
- Boston Globe–Horn Book Award - Picture book: Lon Po Po 1990
- Boston Globe–Horn Book Honor - Picture book: Yeh Shen 1983
- Asian/Pacific American Awards for Literature - Picture book: Wabi Sabi 2008-2009
- Asian/Pacific American Awards for Literature - Picture book: The House Baba Built: An Artist's Childhood in China 2011-2012
- Washington Irving Children's Choice Book Award: Pinocchio 1997, The Hunter 2000
- Publishers Weekly Best Illustrated Books selection: The House Baba Built 2011
- Publishers Weekly Best Illustrated Books selection: Nighttime Ninja, 2012
- Children's Book Council Children's Choice Award: Nighttime Ninja 2013
- Society of Illustrators Lifetime Achievement Award 2016
- The New York Times Best Illustrated Books 2016: Cat From Hunger Mountain
- Eric Carle Museum Lifetime Achievement Award 2017 Carle Honorees

Young's books received the ALA Notable, Junior Library Guild, Parents' Choice, New York Times' Best Illustrated, Publishers Weekly Best Illustrated, and Boston Globe Horn Book Honors, among others. Many of his books have been translated into other languages, including Chinese, Japanese, and Spanish. Several have been published as original Chinese editions.

== Works ==
=== Self-Illustrated books, for children ===
- (With Hilary Beckett) The Rooster's Horns: A Chinese Puppet Play to Make and Perform, 1978.
- (Reteller) The Terrible Nung Gwama: A Chinese Folktale, 1978.
- (Adaptor) The Lion and the Mouse: An Aesop Fable, 1979.
- High on a Hill: A Book of Chinese Riddles, 1980.
- Up a Tree, 1983.
- The Other Bone, 1984.
- (Translator) Lon Po Po: A Red-Riding Hood Story from China, 1989.
- (Reteller) Seven Blind Mice, 1992 (a version of The Blind men and an elephant).
- (Reteller) Moon Mother: A Narrative American Creation Tale, 1993.
- (Reteller) Red Thread, 1993.
- (Reteller) Little Plum, 1994.
- (Reteller) Donkey Trouble, 1995.
- (Adaptor) Pinocchio, 1995.
- (Reteller) Night Visitors, 1995.
- Cat and Rat: The Legend of the Chinese zodiac, 1995.
- (Reteller) Mouse Match: A Chinese Folktale, 1997 (a version of The Mouse Turned into a Maid).
- (Adaptor) Genesis, 1997.
- Voices of the Heart, 1997.
- (Reteller) The Lost Horse: A Chinese Folktale, 1998.
- Monkey King, 2001.
- What About Me?, 2002.
- I, Doko: The Tale of the Basket, 2004.
- Sons of the Dragon King, 2004.
- Beyond the Great Mountains, 2005.
- My Mei Mei, 2006.
- Tiger of the Snows, 2006.
- Hook, 2009.
- The House Baba Built, 2011.
- Should You Be a River, 2015.
- Cat From Hunger Mountain, 2016.
- Voices of the Heart, 2019. (New edition).
- (Reteller, with Stephen Cowan) The Weather's Bet, 2020 (a version of Aesop The Wind and the Sun).
- Talking Tree (小树的话), 2022. (Published in China).
- My Grandfather, Yeh Yeh (我爷爷老丘), 2024. (Published in China).
- Bright World (亮世界), 2024. (Published in China).

=== As Illustrator ===
- Janice May Udry, The Mean Mouse and Other Mean Stories, 1962.
- Leland B. Jacobs and Sally Nohelty, editors, Poetry for Young Scientists, 1964.
- Margaret Hillert, The Yellow Boat, 1966.
- Jane Yolen, The Emperor and the Kite, 1967.
- Robert Wyndam, editor, Chinese Mother Goose Rhymes, 1968.
- Kermit Krueger, The Golden Swans: A Picture Story from Thailand, 1969.
- Mel Evans, The Tiniest Sound, 1969.
- Jane Yolen, The Seventh Mandarin, 1970.
- Renee K. Weiss, The Bird from the Sea, 1970.
- Diane Wolkstein, Eight Thousand Stones: A Chinese Folktale, 1972.
- Jane Yolen, The Girl Who Loved the Wind, 1972.
- L. C. Hunt, editor, The Horse from Nowhere, 1973.
- Donnarae MacCann and Olga Richard, The Child's First Books, 1973.
- Elizabeth Foreman Lewis, Young Fu of the Upper Yangtze, 1973.
- Diane Wolkstein, The Red Lion: A Tale of Ancient Persia, 1977.
- Feenie Ziner, Cricket Boy: A Chinese Tale, 1977.
- N. J. Dawood, Tales from the Arabian Nights, 1978.
- Diane Wolkstein, White Wave: A Chinese Tale, 1979.
- Priscilla Jaquith, Bo Rabbit Smart for True: Folktales from the Gullah, 1981.
- Al-Ling Louie, Yeh-Shen: A Cinderella Story from China, 1982.
- Mary Scioscia, Bicycle Rider, 1983.
- Rafe Martin, Foolish Rabbit's Big Mistake, 1985.
- Jean Fritz, The Double Life of Pocahontas, 1985.
- Margaret Leaf, Eyes of the Dragon, 1987.
- James Howe, I Wish I Were a Butterfly, 1987.
- Tony Johnston, Whale Song, 1987.
- Richard Lewis, In the Night, Still Dark, 1988.
- Nancy Larrick, editor, Cats Are Cats, 1988.
- Robert Frost, Birches, 1988.
- Oscar Wilde, The Happy Prince, 1989.
- Lafcadio Hearn, The Voice of the Great Bell, retold by Margaret Hodges, 1989.
- Ruth Y. Radin, High in the Mountains, 1989.
- Nancy Larrick, editor, Mice Are Nice, 1990.
- Richard Lewis, All of You Was Singing, 1991.
- Nancy White Carlstrom, Goodbye, Geese, 1991.
- Barabara Savage Horton, What Comes in Spring?, 1992.
- Mary Calhoun, While I Sleep, 1992.
- Audrey Osofsky, Dreamcatcher, 1992.
- Laura Krauss Melmed, The First Song Ever Sung, 1993.
- Eleanor Coerr, Sadako and The Thousand Paper Cranes, 1993.
- Isaac Olaleye, Bitter Bananas, 1994.
- Shulamith Levey Oppenheim, reteller, Iblis, 1994.
- Penny Pollock, reteller, The Turkey Girl: A Zuni Cinderella Story, 1996 ( a Native American version of Cinderella)
- Lisa Westberg Peters, October Smiled Back, 1996.
- Jack London, White Fang, 1999.
- Mary Casanova, The Hunter: A Chinese Folktale, 2000.
- Dorothea P. Seeber, A Pup Just for Me—A Boy Just for Me, 2000.
- Tony Johnston, Desert Song, 2000.
- Nikki Grimes, Tai Chi Morning: Snapshots of China, 2004.
- Andrea Cheng, Shanghai Messenger, 2005.
- Dennis Haseley, Twenty Heartbeats, 2008.
- Mark Reibstein, Wabi Sabi, 2008.
- Kimiko Kajikawa, Tsunami!, 2009.
- Brenda Z. Guiberson, Moon Bear, 2010.
- Robert Burleigh, Tiger of the Snows: Tenzing Norgay: The Boy Whose Dream Was Everest, 2010.
- Ashley Ramsden, Seven Fathers 2011.
- Michelle Cuevas, The Masterwork of a Painting Elephant 2011.
- Marilyn Singer, A Strange Place to Call Home: The World's Most Dangerous Habitats & the Animals That Call Them Home, 2012.
- Barbara DaCosta, Nighttime Ninja, 2012.
- Gary Golio, Bird and Diz, 2015.
- Barbara DaCosta, Mighty Moby, 2017.
- Gary Golio, Smile: How Young Charlie Chaplin Taught the World to Laugh (and Cry), 2019.
- Mark Reibstein, Yugen, 2019.
- Brenda Peterson, Catastrophe by the Sea, 2019.
- Barbara DaCosta, Night Shadows, 2020.
- Stephen Cowan, Vessel of Promises, 2021

== Translator ==
"Sage Principles: Discourses on Taiji Medicine", by Cheng Man-ch'ing, co-translator with Tam Gibbs and Stephen Cowan. Ring Press Collective, 2026.

== Film ==
- Sadako and the Thousand Paper Cranes, based on the story by Eleanor Coerr

== Art Exhibits ==
- "Ed Young's Bright World: Gesture and Feeling in 60 Years of Picture Books for Children." Solo retrospective exhibit. Museum of Chinese in America, New York City, New York. May 14, 2026 – September 13, 2026
- "Picturing Poetry." Group exhibit. Art Institute of Chicago, Chicago, Illinois. November 17, 2012 – May 12, 2013.
- "Journey Without End." Solo exhibit. National Center for Children's Illustrated Literature, Abilene, Texas (2011–2012).
- "Ed Young" solo exhibition at the Tang Gallery in Bisbee, Arizona. (2010).
