= The Devil's Arithmetic =

The Devil's Arithmetic may refer to:

- The Devil's Arithmetic (novel), a 1988 historical fiction time slip novel by Jane Yolen
- The Devil's Arithmetic (film), a 1999 historical fantasy TV movie, based on the novel
