= Swimmy (book) =

1961 Caldecott picture book

- Author: Leo Lionni
- Publisher: Alfred A. Knopf
- Publication date: 1963
- Media type: Hardcover
- Pages: 32
- Awards: Caldecott Honor
- ISBN: 0394817133

Swimmy is a 1963 picture book written and illustrated by Leo Lionni. The book is the story of a very small fish who stands out because he has a different color from all of his school. He is curious and adventurous, exploring the sea after being forced away from his home. When he meets a new school that fears leaving their safe rock and being attacked by a predator, Swimmy saves the day by being the leader they need. The book was a recipient of a 1964 Caldecott Honor for its illustrations.

== Plot ==
A very large tuna eats all the red fish who are swimming around, leaving the little Swimmy all alone. Scared and on his own, the little black fish swims away into the large ocean. He sees many beautiful and strange creatures on his journey until he finally discovers another school of little red fish, just like his own family used to be. He excitedly asks them all to come out and play, but they refuse out of fear of being eaten by the big fish. Swimmy tells them they can't spend their whole life hiding in the rocks and they must make a plan. He devises a plan to have all the red fish swim in the shape of a large fish – and then Swimmy takes his place among them in the place the eye would be. After that they are able to swim in the sea without fear – scaring the larger fish away wherever they go.

== Medium ==
Lionni uses paints and stamping in this book to create his underwater world. Lace, cloth, and string are some of the objects used for seaweed, water, and tentacles, respectively.

== Themes ==
In Leo Lionni's obituary, The New York Times writer, Steven Heller, states, "When Swimmy says, 'I will be the eye,' it is clear that this is also a portrait of the artist as seer." Frances Foster, Lionni's long-time editor also said, "I think that's certainly the way Leo saw his role as an artist, seeing for people." Lionni told teacher and author, Vivian Paley, that of all the creations in his writings, Swimmy was the character most like himself.

== Critical reception and awards ==
In her article "Fish Stories: Teaching Children's Literature In A Postmodern World", Karen Coats uses Swimmy as an example of how children's books can be as intellectually demanding as writings for adult audiences. She posits that a book like Swimmy is a simple hero story to children, but adults are able to see additional messages about society and relationships that go beyond the surface story.
