= Neptune Rising =

Neptune Rising may refer to:

- Neptune Rising: Songs and Tales of the Undersea Folk, a 1982 book by Jane Yolen
- Neptune Rising, a composition from the 1975 album The Neptune Collection by The Entourage Music and Theater Ensemble
