= Wolkstein =

Wolkstein is a surname. Notable people with the surname include:

- Diane Wolkstein (1942–2013), American folklorist and author
- Lauren Wolkstein (born 1982), American film director, writer, and editor
