= Robert J. Avrech =

American screenwriter

- Born: United States
- Occupation: Screenwriter

Robert J. Avrech is an American screenwriter whose works include the 1984 film Body Double (with Brian De Palma) and A Stranger Among Us (1992). He won an Emmy Award for his screenplay The Devil's Arithmetic, based on the young adult novel by Jane Yolen.

He is also the author of the children's novel The Hebrew Kid and the Apache Maiden and the memoir How I Married Karen, and publishes personal and political writings on his blog, Seraphic Press.

== Personal life ==
Avrech is an Orthodox Jew and a graduate of the Yeshiva of Flatbush in Brooklyn, New York, Yeshiva University High School for Boys, and Bard College. He was the father of two daughters and a son, but his son Ariel died of complications from severe pulmonary fibrosis at the age of 22. Avrech established Seraphic Press in his son's memory, to publish works "for Jewish teens". However, only one such title, The Hebrew Kid and the Apache Maiden, has been published. His writings have also appeared in The Jewish Press.

Avrech also established the Ariel Avrech Memorial Lecture series at Young Israel of Century City in memory of his son. Early titles in this lecture series included "What Was the Rosh Yeshiva Reading: Intellectual Openness in 19th Century Lithuania", while more recent titles have included "Shifting Alliances: Why Liberals No Longer Reliably Support Israel — And Conservatives Do".

== Filmography ==
- Blood Bride (1980, also director)
- Body Double (1984)
- Dark Tower (1987, credited as Robert J. Avereck)
- Scandal in a Small Town (1988, credited as Robert Avrech)
- Spymaker: The Secret Life of Ian Fleming (1990)
- A Stranger Among Us (1992)
- Running Delilah (1993, credited as Robert Avrech)
- The Infiltrator (1995)
- Into Thin Air: Death on Everest (1997)
- Max Q (1998)
- The Devil's Arithmetic (1999)
- Brotherhood of Murder (1999)
- Within These Walls (2001)
