= Frederick (book) =

1967 children's book by Leo Lionni

- Author: Leo Lionni
- Illustrator: Leo Lionni
- Genre: Children's fiction; Animal stories
- Published: 1967, Renewed 1995
- Publisher: Pantheon Books
- Pages: 28
- Award: Caldecott Honor
- ISBN: 978-0-394-81040-9
- OCLC: 239309

Frederick is a 1967 children's book by Leo Lionni. The book is about a group of field mice who are gathering food, except the titular mouse who prefers to store up something special for the winter instead. The book won a 1968 Caldecott Honor for its illustrations and is listed in the literary reference book 1001 Children's Books You Must Read Before You Grow Up.

== Plot ==
On a farm, a colony of field mice who live in a stone wall prepare to gather food for the winter. One of the mice however, Frederick, strangely does not do anything; when asked about what he is doing, Frederick states he is gathering "sunlight for the cold dark winter days", "colors, for winter is gray", and "words, for the winter days are long and many, and we'll run out of things to say". When winter arrives, the family spend their days feasting on the abundance they had collected. However, as winter progresses, their food supply becomes low and the mice feel cold with nothing to talk about. Then, they remember what Frederick had said, and gather near him, and ask about his "supplies". Frederick begins to talk about the sunlight and the colors, and as he talks, the mice start to feel warmer and vividly picture the colors in their minds. Finally, Frederick recites a poem about the seasons, where he depicts them as "four little field mice who live up in the sky". When he finishes, the mice applaud him, calling him a poet; Frederick bashfully states "I know it".
