= Raising Yoder's Barn =

1998 children's book written by Jane Yolen and illustrated by Bernie Fuchs

Raising Yoder's Barn is a 1998 illustrated children's book written by Jane Yolen and illustrated by Bernie Fuchs. The story is centered on a traditional, Amish barn raising and the Amish sense of community.

== Plot ==
The story, written in the lyrical prose style, is narrated by eight-year-old Matthew Yoder. Matthew does not know any other life than growing up on a Pennsylvania farm. Matthew has great pride in working in the fields alongside his brothers and father. When a lightning storm destroys the Yoder's barn, the community is called to action to put the fire out. Once the ashes settle, the Yoders plan a barn raising. The women bring food and the men work to build the structure. Matthew worries that he will not be able to help in the barn raising because of his age. Samuel Stulzfoot, the organizer, gives Matthew a very special job of being his "voice" and carrying his instructions to the other workers. After a very long day, the barn is complete and the family asks God to bless their new barn and the upcoming harvest season. The new season proves fruitful and Matthew anxiously awaits another year of helping his family in the fields.

== Art ==
The illustrations, by Bernie Fuchs are prints of oil paintings. Muted reds, yellows, browns, and tans are the primary colors used in this book.
