= Max Q (film) =

- Genre: Science fiction
- Teleplay by: Marty Kaplan; Robert J. Avrech
- Story by: Marty Kaplan
- Directed by: Michael Shapiro
- Starring: Bill Campbell; Paget Brewster; Ned Vaughn; Geoffrey Blake; Tasha Smith; Denis Arndt; Christopher John Fields; Kevin McNulty; Leslie Horan; Chris Ellis; Greg Michaels
- Music by: Nick Glennie-Smith
- Country of origin: United States
- Original language: English

Production
- Executive producer: Jerry Bruckheimer
- Producer: David Roessell
- Cinematography: Glen MacPherson
- Editor: Michael Schweitzer
- Running time: 91 minutes
- Production companies: Jerry Bruckheimer Films; Touchstone Television

Original release
- Network: ABC
- Release: November 19, 1998

Max Q, or Max Q: Emergency Landing, is a 1998 American science fiction television film directed by Michael Shapiro and written by Marty Kaplan and Robert J. Avrech. The film stars Bill Campbell, Paget Brewster, Ned Vaughn, Geoffrey Blake, Tasha Smith, Denis Arndt, Christopher John Fields, Kevin McNulty, Leslie Horan, Chris Ellis, and Greg Michaels. The film was produced by Jerry Bruckheimer Films and Touchstone Television and premiered on ABC on November 19, 1998.

== Plot summary ==
The US Space Shuttle Endeavour is launched into space to release a new satellite. An explosion occurs and the crew has to find a way to get back to Earth without atmospheric pressure (max q) crushing the damaged shuttle.

== Cast ==
- Bill Campbell as Clay Jarvis
- Paget Brewster as Rena Winter
- Ned Vaughn as Scott Hines
- Geoffrey Blake as Jonah Randall
- Tasha Smith as Karen Daniels
- Denis Arndt as Don Mitchum
- Christopher John Fields as Elliot Henschel
- Kevin McNulty as Oz Gilbert
- Leslie Horan as Melissa Hines
- Chris Ellis as Bob Matthews
- Greg Michaels as Rusty Porter
