= Cards of Grief =

Cards of Grief is a novel by Jane Yolen published in 1984.

== Plot summary ==
Cards of Grief is a novel in which an anthropologist from Earth falls in love with a native from a world where the custom of grieving is nearly an artform.

== Reception ==
Dave Langford reviewed Cards of Grief for White Dwarf #86, and stated that "the secrets and plot turns are merely sad, and Yolen's low, moaning narrative tone makes this not a punch book but a memorable one."

== Reviews ==
- Review by Veronica M. S. Kennedy (1985) in Fantasy Review, June 1985
- Review by Tom Easton (1985) in Analog Science Fiction/Science Fact, July 1985
- Review by Colin Bird (1987) in Paperback Inferno, #65
- Review by Ken Brown (1987) in Interzone, #20 Summer 1987
