= John Schoenherr =

American illustrator (1935–2010)

- Born: John Carl Schoenherr; July 5, 1935; New York City, New York
- Died: April 8, 2010 (aged 74); Easton, Pennsylvania, USA
- Occupation: Illustrator
- Spouse: Judith Grey
- Children: Ian, Jenny
- Writing career
- Period: 1958–2007
- Genres: Science fiction, children's picture books
- Subject: Wildlife
- Notable works: The Illustrated Dune; Owl Moon
- Notable awards: Hugo Award (1965); Caldecott Medal (1988)

John Carl Schoenherr (July 5, 1935 – April 8, 2010) was an American illustrator. He won the 1988 Caldecott Medal for U.S. children's book illustration, recognizing Owl Moon by Jane Yolen, which recounts the story of the first time a father takes his youngest child on a traditional outing to spot an owl. He was posthumously inducted into the Science Fiction and Fantasy Hall of Fame in 2015.

== Early life ==
Schoenherr was born July 5, 1935, in New York City (Manhattan) and raised in Queens, "in a German-speaking household in a polyglot community", where he used drawings to communicate with speakers of other languages. He graduated from Stuyvesant High School, and studied art at the Art Students League of New York with Will Barnet and at Pratt Institute.

== Career ==
=== Dune ===
Schoenherr may be known best as the original illustrator of the dust jacket art of Dune, a 1965 science fiction novel by Frank Herbert that inaugurated a book series and media franchise. He had previously illustrated the serializations of the novel in Analog, an endeavor which secured him a 1965 Hugo Award for Best Professional Artist. He later did the art for the Analog serialization of Herbert's Children of Dune. In 1978 Berkley Books published The Illustrated Dune, an edition of Dune with 33 black-and-white sketch drawings and 8 full color paintings by Schoenherr. Herbert wrote in 1980 that though he had not spoken to Schoenherr prior to the artist creating the paintings, the author was surprised to find that the artwork appeared exactly as he had imagined its fictional subjects, including sandworms, Baron Harkonnen, and the Sardaukar.

=== Other works ===
Schoenherr was also very well known as a wildlife artist and children's book illustrator, with over forty books to his credit. Most of his black-and-white illustration work used the scratchboard technique, and he was long known as the only commercial artist who specialized in it. His paintings were often egg tempera, another unusual medium. Schoenherr also completed paintings for NASA. Schoenherr's knowledge of zoology was very useful in creating alien creatures. He was a member of the American Society of Mammalogists, the Society of Animal Artists, and the Society of Illustrators.

Beginning in the 1960s, Schoenherr created numerous science fiction illustrations, in addition to artwork in other genres. Among the books he illustrated are The Wolfling and Rascal by Sterling North, the latter a Newbery Honor Book. Under John W. Campbell, Jr. and Ben Bova at Analog, he also illustrated the first Dragonriders of Pern stories by Anne McCaffrey, the 1967/1968 novellas "Weyr Search" and "Dragonrider" (each featured on one Analog cover as well) that were subsequently developed as the novel Dragonflight. Schoenherr's July 1975 cover for Analog has been cited as influential in the designs for the Star Wars character Chewbacca. He also worked for paperback and hardcover science fiction publishers like Ace Books and Doubleday.

== Personal life ==
Schoenherr was a resident of Delaware Township, Hunterdon County, New Jersey. He died on April 8, 2010, of chronic obstructive pulmonary disease in Easton, Pennsylvania.

== Awards ==
- 1965 Hugo Award for Best Professional Artist
- 1988 Caldecott Medal for Owl Moon by Jane Yolen
- 2015 Science Fiction and Fantasy Hall of Fame
