= Seven Blind Mice =

1992 children's picture book by Ed Young

- Author: Ed Young
- Language: English
- Genre: Picture book
- Publisher: Philomel Books
- Publication date: April 29, 1992
- Publication place: United States
- Pages: 40
- Awards: Caldecott Honor
- ISBN: 978-0-399-22261-0

Seven Blind Mice is a children's picture book written and illustrated by Ed Young. Based on the Indian fable of the blind men and an elephant, the book tells the story of seven mice who, each day, explore and describe a different part of the elephant. It was well received by critics and received a Caldecott Honor for its illustrations.

== Background ==
When planning the book, Ed Young believed that the story would work better with pictures if the blind men were instead small animals exploring the elephant. He considered using monkeys at first, but wanted an even smaller animal, so settled on having the characters be mice instead.

Having added a seventh character, Young then began introducing other concepts that worked with that number, such as colors, with six of the mice representing the rainbow and the seventh a light. He later introduced the idea of the seven days of the week.

== Reception ==
Ed Young's book was received positively, including a starred review from The Horn Book Magazine. Horn Book's review praised the art, "where the brightly colored mice cavort against black backgrounds", and called the elephant's design "striking". A review for the School Library Journal also praised the book's art, saying the collage was "vibrant", and its use on a completely black background resulted in a "strong visual impact."

Publishers Weekly called Seven Blind Mice a "stunning celebration of color", and also noted how the sparse use of text allows for "greater exploration and enjoyment of the artwork". The reviewer noted, though, that the story's moral could be seen as "superfluous" by some.

Kirkus Reviews called Young's retelling of the blind men and an elephant through the use of collage "innovative" and commented on the "dramatic black ground" in which the illustrations and text are superimposed against. Kirkus also noted how the final mouse, the one capable of seeing the whole picture, is the only female one. They concluded by calling the book "[e]xquisitely crafted".

Seven Blind Mice was the recipient of a Caldecott Honor in 1993.

== Adaptation ==
A video and audio version of the book was produced and published by Weston Woods Studios in 2007. The background music was done by Ernest V. Troost, while the narration was by BD Wong. The recording was also accompanied by a short interview with Young, who discussed the fable and talked about push back the book received "for having the white mouse figure out the puzzle, while noting that no one took exception to the fact that the smart mouse was the only female in the group".

This version was well received by critics and received ALA's "Notable Children's Recordings" award in 2008.
