= Running Delilah =

- Genre: Science Fiction; Thriller
- Written by: Ron Koslow; Robert J. Avrech
- Directed by: Richard Franklin
- Starring: Kim Cattrall; Billy Zane
- Music by: Lee Holdridge
- Country of origin: United States
- Original language: English

Production
- Executive producer: Ron Koslow
- Producers: Mel Efros; Steve Oster
- Cinematography: Ellery Ryan
- Editor: Andrew London
- Running time: 97 minutes
- Production companies: ABC Productions; Empty Chair Productions; Sea Change Productions

Original release
- Release: August 29, 1994

Running Delilah is a 1994 American made-for-television science fiction thriller film directed by Richard Franklin, starring Kim Cattrall and Billy Zane, and aired on ABC. It was intended as the pilot episode for a TV series.

== Plot ==
Top agent Delilah dies in a risky mission against weapons dealer Kercharian. She is revived using high-tech medicine and given artificial body parts. She returns as an invincible superwoman and continues her fight against Kercherian, who is currently seeking plutonium from Russia.

== Cast ==
- Kim Cattrall as Christina / Delilah
- Billy Zane as Paul
- François Guétary as Lucas
- Yorgo Voyagis as Alec Kasharian
- Diana Rigg as Judith
- Michael Francis Clarke as Operative #1
- Dawn Comer as Language Lab Technician
- Rob LaBelle as Watcher
- Marilyn McIntyre as Barbara
- Philip Moon as Technician #2
- Quentin O'Brien as Operative #2
- Philip Sokoloff as Iraqi Scientist
- Eric Stone as Liaison
- Richard Topol as Technician #1
- Victor Touzei as Security Guard #1

== Production ==
The production was filmed in 1992 but not broadcast on television until 1994.

== Home video ==
It was released on video in Japan, Sweden, and the UK in 1993, followed by the USA and Germany in 1994. The film was known as Robospy in Australia and was released on video in the UK as Cyborg Agent.

== References to earlier films ==
The overall concept bears significant similarity to the premise of RoboCop (1987) as well as The Bionic Woman (1976‒1978).

A hideout uses the password "swordfish", a reference to Horse Feathers (1932).

Delilah and Paul watch clips of It's a Wonderful Life (1946) on their Paris hotel's television, dubbed into French.
