= Eric Carle Museum of Picture Book Art =

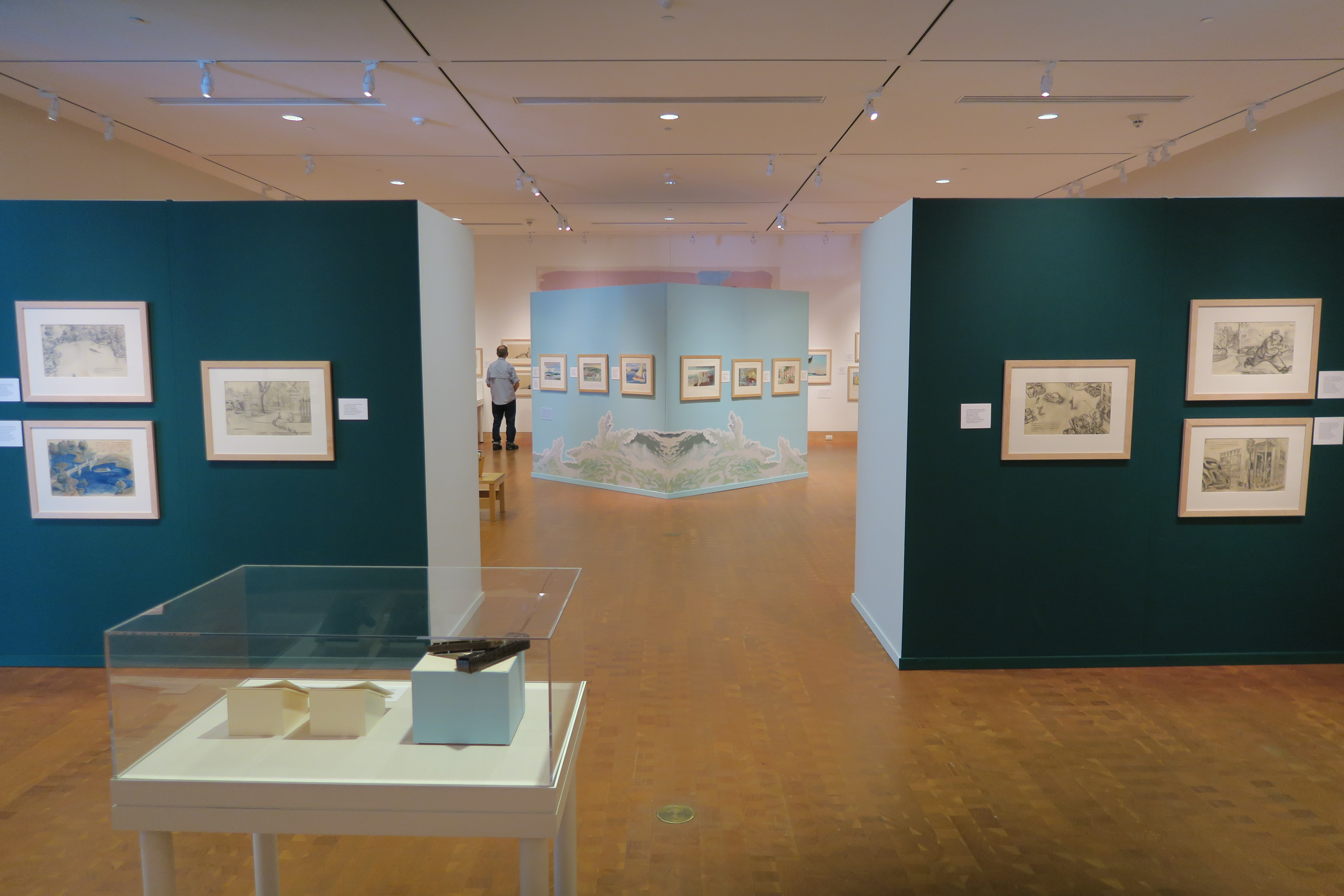
- Eric Carle Museum of Picture Book Art
- Location: Amherst, Massachusetts
- Coordinates: 42.3211°N 72.5330°W
- Type: Art Museum
- Website: carlemuseum.org

The Eric Carle Museum of Picture Book Art is a museum devoted to the art of the picture book and especially the children's book. It is a member of Museums10 and is located within the campus of Hampshire College in Amherst, Massachusetts. The Carle was founded in 2002 by Eric and Barbara Carle, and designed by Juster Pope Frazier Architects.

== History ==
Together with his wife Barbara, Eric Carle, the author and illustrator of more than 70 books, including the 1969 classic The Very Hungry Caterpillar, founded the museum. It was the first full-scale museum in the United States devoted to national and international picture book art. The Museum's stated goal is to foster connections between visual and verbal literacy and to provide visitors of all ages and backgrounds with the opportunity to explore their own creativity and the confidence to appreciate and enjoy art of every kind.

== Exhibitions ==
The museum includes three rotating galleries, each housing picture book art. The West Gallery is devoted to the work of Eric Carle, while the East and Central galleries present the work of numerous picture book artists.

=== Past exhibitions ===
- Maurice Sendak: Inside and Out (November 22, 2002 - January 12, 2003)
- The Birth of a Book: Robert Ingpen (November 22, 2002 - February 23, 2003)
- The Colorful World of Eric Carle (November 22, 2002 - March 23, 2003)
- Nancy Ekholm Burkert: The Art of Illustration (January 31 - March 30, 2003)
- Children’s Book Week Posters (March 4 -May 18 2003)
- The Art of Mitsumasa Anno: Bridging Cultures (April 15 - June 29 2003)
- Out and About: The Many Worlds of Eric Carle (March 28 - July 13 2003)
- Leo Lionni: A Passion for Creativity (July 13 - October 19 2003)
- Ashley Bryan: Beautiful Blackbird (May 29 - October 19 2003)
- Eric Carle: Carnival of Animals (July 17 -November 9 2003)
- From the Silver Age to Stalin: Russian Children’s Book Illustration in the Sasha Lurye Collection (November 7- January 18 2003)
- Trashworks: The Art of Jeanne Steig (January 31 - April 4th 2004)
- Heart and Humor: The Picture Book Art of William Steig ( February 8 - April 25 2004)
- Selections from The Art of Eric Carle: Beginning with Bears ( November 14 - May 30 2004)
- The Many Paths of Dr. Seuss: Four Points of the Compass (May 7 - July 11, 2004)
- The Mysteries of Chris Van Allsburg (November 20, 2004 - March 13, 2005)
- The Wonderful Art of Oz (July 11 - October 22, 2006)
- Picture Stories: A Celebration of African American Illustrators (March 24 - June 17, 2007)
- Dorothy Kunhardt's Pat the Bunny (May 16 - December 7, 2008)
- 80/40: Celebrating the Birthdays of Eric Carle and The Very Hungry Caterpillar (February 10 - September 6, 2009)
- Drawings from the Heart: Tomie dePaola Turns 75 (July 3 - November 1, 2009)
- Golden Legacy: Original Art from 65 Years of Golden Books Featuring Artwork from Iconic Children's Books (November 24, 2009 - February 28, 2010)
- Into the Wood: Antonio Frasconi's Art for Children (March 16 - June 13, 2010)
- Leo Lionni: Geraldine, the Music Mouse (May 4 - November 28, 2010)
- Eric Carle: A Feast for the Eyes (September 21, 2010 - March 20, 2011)
- Monsters and Miracles: A Journey through Jewish Picture Books (October 15, 2010 - January 23, 2011)
- Partners in Wonder: Selections from the Collection of Jane Yolen (December 14, 2010 - May 1, 2011)
- What a Circus! The Art of Étienne Delessert (February 8, 2011 - June 5, 2011)
- Let's Talk! Animals from the Collection (August 8, 2020 - January 24, 2021)
- Speechless: The Art of Wordless Picture Books (July 17, 2021 - December 5, 2021)
- Ashley Bryan in Song (June 12, 2021 - November 7, 2021)

== Public Art Program ==
The Art Studio at the Museum is open to visitors of all ages during regular Museum hours and supports the aims of the Museum by encouraging making, appreciating, and thinking about art. Activities and materials change regularly and are inspired by the Museum's exhibitions. The Public Art Program is Free with Museum Admission.

== Programs & events ==
Designed for classroom teachers, librarians, art teachers, and others interested in engaging students in the visual arts and the art of the book, the Museum's professional development programs emphasize teaching through the arts and encourage critical and creative thinking.

The Carle Honors is an annual awards and fundraising event hosted by the museum. Each year the event honors artists and authors who have made an impact in the genre of picture books. Works of art are also auctioned to benefit the museum.

== Benefit publications ==
In 2009, Putnam/Philomel published Artist To Artist: 23 Major Illustrators Talk to Children about Their Art, with contributors including Mitsumasa Anno, Quentin Blake, Carle, Tomie dePaola, Leo Lionni, Barry Moser, Robert Sabuda, Maurice Sendak and Rosemary Wells. All profits from the book went to benefit the museum.
