= Lillie Pope =

American educator (1918–2015)

Lillie Pope (June 22, 1918 - October 26, 2015) was an American educator who was regarded as a pioneer in special education, with a focus on literacy, learning problems, learning, and reading disabilities.

Pope was the founding director of the earliest Learning Center as part of the Mental Health Service at a public hospital. She was an author of books and producer of films to guide in prevention and remediation of learning problems.

== Early life ==
Pope was born in Manhattan, but grew up in Bensonhurst, Brooklyn. She attended Brooklyn College, transferring to Hunter College, where she received her BA. After graduating from college in 1937, she began working as a teacher in public schools at the age of 19.

== Career ==
During her professional career as a teacher, she was elected to the office of Vice President of the Vocational High School Teachers Association, as well as to the office of Vice President of the Teachers' Union. In the 1940s, equipment needed to be improved for effective teaching, class sizes were abnormally large, and trade teachers taught eight periods daily compared to their academic colleagues who carried a five-period daily load. Her efforts led to reduced class sizes and teaching loads, and to improved equipment in the shop classes.

She left the public school system in 1952 and earned a Ph.D. in Educational Psychology at New York University.

After several years as an Educational Psychologist in a hospital setting, she established the first Learning Center in a mental health setting in this country for students with learning problems. Her center served as a model for many who followed. She worked closely with the schools, guiding teachers, paraprofessionals, volunteers and parents in how to help their students become readers.

Working in an impoverished area in Coney Island, she employed and trained neighborhood women to assist in this work. A number of these women went back to school and gained careers in education. While there, she employed the Bread and Puppet Theatre as part of the therapeutic program for children served by the clinic. She retired from the mental health center as Associate Chief of Child Psychiatry. Dr. Pope, Diplomate in School Psychology, has served as a consultant to educational and mental health agencies, and as adjunct professor at Brooklyn College and New York University.

== Later life ==
She has published many books, as well as papers in professional journals, and her speaking engagements and workshops have been numerous. Importantly, she was the Keynote Speaker at the International Conference of the United Electrical Workers; her address was published as a pamphlet by the United Electrical Workers and also translated into Spanish, as a guide to the workers on how to understand and deal with the learning problems of their children. She also was the Keynote Speaker several times at the Atlantic Conference on Learning Disabilities in Halifax, Canada, and conducted training workshops there as well. She produced three 16mm. Films and The Psycho-Educational Battery, circulated on request to teachers in the United States and Canada; these guided teachers in diagnosing and remediating the needs of learners who need assistance.

In 1983, her friend, the writer Ezra Jack Keats died. He had set up a foundation to promote children’s literacy and diversity in children’s literature and after his death, Pope and her husband administered the foundation. As Educational Director and Vice-President of the Ezra Jack Keats Foundation, Pope facilitated thousands of programs in schools and public libraries in the 50 states by providing grants for programs that encourage literacy, creativity, and joy in learning.

Her published material (books, tests, and papers), as well as the instructional films that she produced, reside in the archives of the Tamiment Library at New York University.

She was married to Martin Pope and they had two children.

== Honors and awards ==
Honoree, The Clara Lemlich Award for Social Activism, 2011, which honors women who have been working for the larger good all their lives.

Honoree, Eric Carle Museum of Picture Book Art, 2007, for innovative and effective support of children’s literature.

Hunter College Hall of Fame, 1997

Council for Exceptional Children, Outstanding Service Award, 1990

Mary Hornby award for distinguished contributions in the field of learning disabilities, Atlantic Conference for Learning Disabilities, 1981.

Fellowship, National Institute of Mental Health, 1966-67.

== Publications ==
=== Books ===
Guidelines for Teaching Remedial Reading to the Disadvantaged (Book-Lab, 1967)

Psycho-Educational Evaluation of the Pre-School Child (Grune and Stratton,1972) (also in Spanish and Italian)

Tutor’s Sampler (Book-Lab, 1973)

Issues in Urban Education and Mental Health (Book-Lab, 1974)

Pope-Dinola Word Bank (New Directions Press, 1977)

Special Needs, Special Answers (Book-Lab, 1979)

Guidelines for Teaching Children with Learning Problems (Book-Lab, 1982)

Guidelines for Teaching Remedial Reading, a Holistic Approach (Book-Lab, 1996)

Word Play: A Dictionary of Idioms (Book-Lab, 1998)

Teach Anyone to Read: The No-Nonsense Guide (EJK Publishing, 2008)

=== Tests and instruments for evaluation ===
PEB: Psycho-Educational Battery (Book-Lab, 1976) Inventory of Reading Skills (Book-Lab, 1974)

=== Tapes ===
Introductory Course in Learning Disabilities, a five-session taped course (Book-Lab, 1976)

=== Films and videos ===
All for One - Tutorial Highlights (Single Concepts, 1973)

Let’s Look at Sounding Out (Single Concepts, 1973)

Evaluation for Educational Planning (Video-Time Productions, 1976)

Ten Module Tutorial in Reading Instruction for Volunteers (Lilrob Productions, 1992)
