= Scandal in a Small Town =

1988 American TV film

- Newspaper ad
- Genre: Drama
- Written by: Robert J. Avrech
- Directed by: Anthony Page
- Starring: Raquel Welch; Christa Denton; Frances Lee McCain; Robin Gammell; Peter Van Norden; Ronny Cox
- Music by: Mark Snow
- Country of origin: United States
- Original language: English

Production
- Producers: Mark Carliner; Michele Rappaport
- Production locations: Verdugo Hills High School - 10625 Plainview Avenue, Tujunga, Los Angeles, California
- Cinematography: Paul Lohmann
- Editor: Skip Schoolnik
- Running time: 91 minutes
- Production company: Carliner-Rappaport Productions

Original release
- Network: NBC
- Release: April 10, 1988

Scandal in a Small Town is a 1988 television film directed by Anthony Page and starring Raquel Welch.

== Plot ==
Leda Beth Vincent lives in the small town of Shiloh. Her daughter Julie is a high school student who experiences antisemitic propaganda in her history class. Leda thinks this is unacceptable and tries to fight the school board. She is forced to take them and the teacher responsible to court.

== Cast of characters ==
- Raquel Welch as Leda Beth Vincent
- Christa Denton as Julie Vincent
- Frances Lee McCain as Gwendolyn McLeod
- Robin Gammell as Professor Paul Martin
- Peter Van Norden as Lawyer
- Ronny Cox as George Baker
- Mickey Jones as Glenn
- Peter Palmer as Scottie
- Harold Pruett as Michael
- Helen Page Camp as Mrs. Bengston

== Production ==
In a 1988 interview, Raquel Welch explained the appeal of the script, saying, "One reason I liked this script is because I have dealt with a teenage daughter myself and I know the problems of raising a young woman who at that age is going to reject you and your ideas and will challenge your authority and seek out her own identity."

In a 1988 interview, Raquel Welch explained that the title had been changed, saying, "It's about somebody who discovers that their daughter is being taught antisemitism in school and really rather stumbles across it-- uh, upon this kind of thing, and then has to take issue with the school board and eventually go to court over it, and it makes her a target for a lot of very ugly things. They're calling it Scandal in a Small Town. It used to be called The Education of Leda Beth, but somebody thought Scandal in a Small Town sounded more juicy, I guess, so that's what they're calling it this week. I tried! I tried to stop them, but they wouldn't listen."

== Broadcast ==
The film aired on NBC on Sunday, April 10, 1988, 9-11 p.m. Eastern time.

== Reception ==
In a glowing review for FilmInk, reviewer Erin Free states that "Welch's best telemovie [...] is arguably 1988's Scandal In A Small Town, partly because of its solid, ambitious story, but also because it effectively utilises Welch's striking beauty rather than attempting to suppress it." The reviewer furthermore praises the work of the crew, stating that the film is "Strongly directed by Unsung Auteur Anthony Page (The Lady Vanishes, Absolution) and punchily written by Robert J. Avrech (who penned Brian De Palma's Body Double)".
