= The Emperor and the Kite =

1967 book by Jane Yolen

- Dust jacket of the First Edition, designed by Ed Young
- Author: Jane Yolen
- Illustrator: Ed Young
- Cover artist: Young
- Language: English
- Genre: Picture book
- Publisher: Putnam and Grosset
- Publication date: 1967
- Publication place: United States
- Media type: Print
- Pages: 32 pp
- ISBN: 9780698116443

The Emperor and the Kite, written by Jane Yolen and illustrated by Ed Young, is a 1967 picture book. The Emperor and the Kite was a Caldecott Medal Honor Book for 1968 and was Young's first Caldecott Honor Medal of a total of three during his career.

== Description ==
The story, written by Yolen, is told in present tense from the third-person point of view (a third person narrative) and takes the form of a short story of 32 pages. A lot of this story is centralized upon the daughter and how everyone's opinion changes once the daughter does something amazing. The illustrations by Young, which also precede and follow the text, include a very detailed and traditional style of art that follows very closely to the actions that are being presented in the text.

== Synopsis ==
In Imperial China, there is an emperor who has four sons and three daughters that meant the world to him. He, later on, has a fourth daughter named Djeow Seow. This emperor barely pays attention to the small and young Djeow Seow. One day these "bad" men come and take the emperor from his throne to an isolated and secluded tower and then lie to everyone that the emperor is dead. The "bad" men did not notice Djeow Seow watching all the events unfold from a corner. She preserves her father's life by sending him baskets of food via kite to the hidden tower. The daughter used to play with her kite every day because no one noticed or paid any attention to her. This being her chance, she thinks of the idea to use her kite string to rescue her father. The emperor then slides down along the string of the kite to safety and returns home to reclaim China from these people who kidnapped him. He rules happily with his youngest daughter now by his side, showering her with love and affection after the events that unfolded.

== See also ==
- Children's literature
