= Frances Foster (editor) =

Children's books editor

Frances Foster (née Starbuck, June 3, 1931 – June 8, 2014) was a children's books editor.

== Early life and career ==
Frances Foster, née Frances Starbuck, was born on June 3, 1931. Her father was a banker and her mother an artist. Born in Oakland, California, Foster and her family moved to Berkeley after her parents opened a weaving studio, where she spent most of her childhood. Foster studied at Denison University, where she received a bachelor's degree in English literature in 1953.

After she finished studying, Foster spent one year working in Rome. She then returned to the United States in search of a job in the book publishing industry. She went to Alice Dalgliesh's office and asked her for a job, which Dalgliesh offered, as her previous assistant was going on maternity leave. After some time working with Dalgliesh, Foster left to become a freelance editor at Knopf while raising her two children. During her time working for Knopf, Foster served as the editor of several notable authors, such as Leo Lionni and Roald Dahl.

In 1995, Foster was hired by the publishing company Farrar, Straus and Giroux to head a new imprint under her name, Frances Foster Books. The imprint would publish around a dozen new children's books every year, with titles by authors such as Peter Sís and Louis Sachar.

Foster retired from her work as editor in 2013 due to health issues.

== Personal life ==
Foster married her husband in 1956, with whom she had two children. Foster was cousin to writer and poet Elizabeth Coatsworth, and her grandmother's brother was Elbert Hubbard, an artist who founded the Roycroft Press.

== Death ==
Foster died on June 8, 2014, at the age of 83. According to her daughter, it was due to a stroke she suffered in 2012.
