= Martin Pope =

American physical chemist (1918–2022)

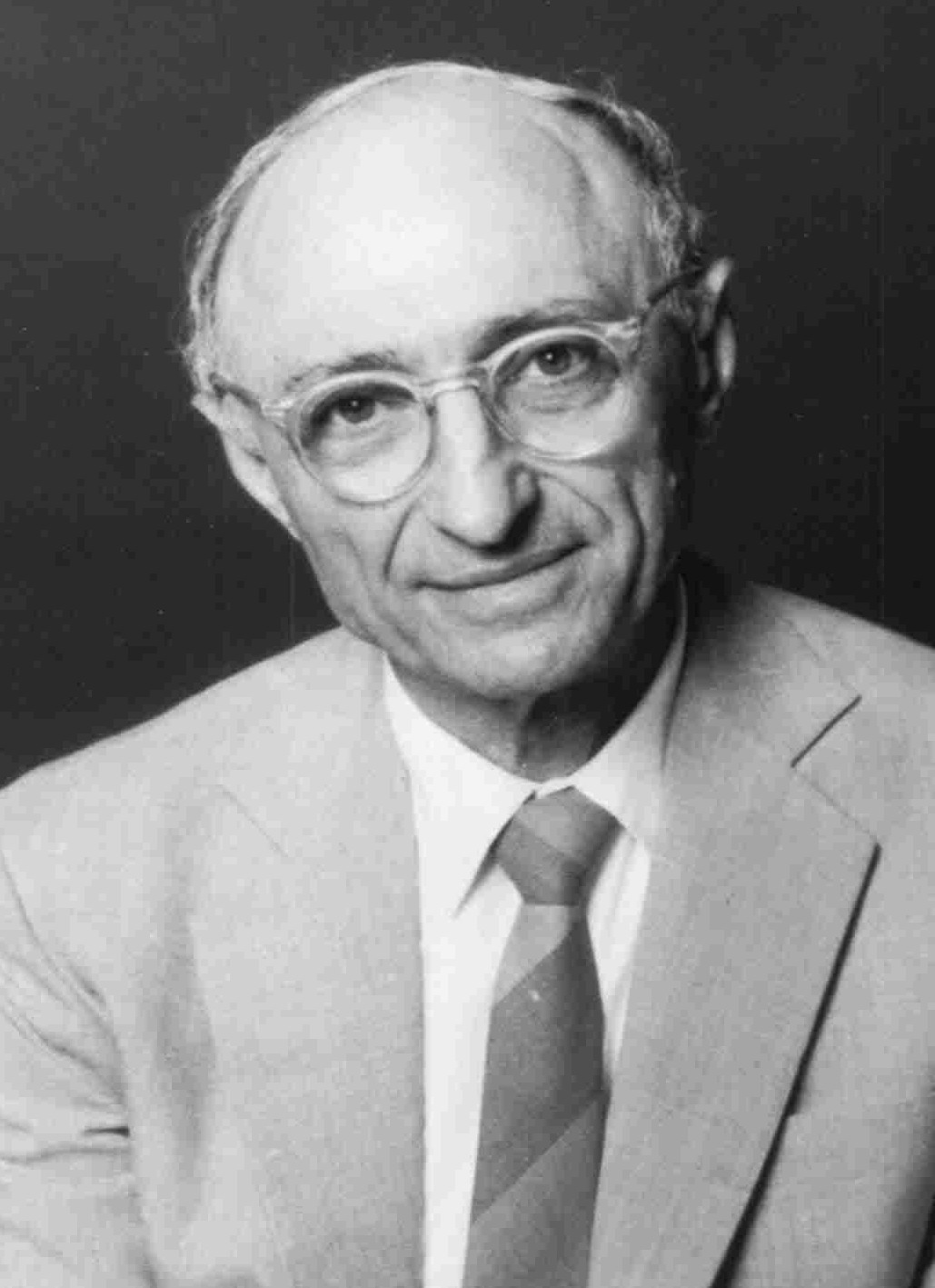
- Born: Isidore Poppick; August 22, 1918; New York City, U.S.
- Died: March 27, 2022 (aged 103); New York City, U.S.
- Occupation: Physical chemist
- Spouse: Lillie Pope (m. 1946; died 2015)
- Scientific career
- Fields: Physical chemistry
- Institutions: New York University
- Thesis: The Diffusion of Neutral Molecules in a Cation Exchange Resin (1951)
- Doctoral advisor: Harry P .Gregor

Martin Pope (born Isidore Poppick; August 22, 1918 – March 27, 2022) was an American physical chemist and professor at New York University.

His discoveries of ohmic contacts and research in the fields of organic insulators and semiconductors led to techniques enabling organic semiconductors to carry relatively large currents, and to convert electricity into light and vice versa. These discoveries have had application in electrophotography, organic light-emitting diodes (OLED), photovoltaic cells, biological sensors, transistors, molecular electronics, and batteries.

For his work, Dr. Pope was awarded the Davy Medal from the Royal Society in 2006.

== Biography ==
Martin Pope was born in 1918 to Jewish immigrants from Ukraine. The second of four sons, Pope grew up on New York's Lower East Side. He attended the City College of New York, graduating with a bachelor's degree in chemistry in 1939.

While at CCNY, Pope assisted in nuclear experiments at Columbia University and met Fermi, Schwinger, Dunning and other key figures in the development of nuclear fission. After graduation, he served in the Army Air Force in the Pacific, where he reached the rank of first lieutenant. After the war, Pope returned home and found work at Balco Research Laboratories, where he received two patents for thin film inventions. He received his Ph.D. in 1950 from the Brooklyn Polytechnic Institute.

He joined the faculty of New York University in 1956 as a researcher in the Radiation and Solid State Physics Lab (RSSL). In 1988, he retired as professor of chemistry and director of the RSSL. He became professor emeritus, physical chemistry at NYU. He was still active in research until the final years of his life. He published his last two papers in 2003 and 2004.

== Personal life and death ==
Pope married Lillie Pope, an educational psychologist and author, in 1946. She died in 2015.

He turned 100 in August 2018, and died on March 27, 2022, at the age of 103.
