= Owl Moon =

Book by Jane Yolen

- Owl Moon cover
- Author: Jane Yolen
- Illustrator: John Schoenherr
- Cover artist: Schoenherr
- Language: English
- Genre: Children's picture book
- Publisher: Philomel Books
- Publication date: 1987
- Publication place: United States
- ISBN: 978-0-399-21457-8
- OCLC: 15198290
- Dewey Decimal: [E] 19
- LC Class: PZ7.Y78 Ow 1987

Owl Moon is a 1987 children's picture book written by Jane Yolen and illustrated by John Schoenherr. It won a number of awards, most notably the Caldecott Medal for its illustrations, and appeared on the public television series Reading Rainbow. It has been translated into more than a dozen foreign languages, including French, German, Chinese, and Korean. In 1989, Weston Woods Studios adapted the book into an animated film narrated by Yolen.

Yolen described the book as a positive family story, saying "It's about a girl and her father. Usually stories of a little girl are with her mother. It is gentle yet adventurous, quiet yet full of sound."

== Plot ==
The story deals with a father who takes his child out owling for the first time on a cold winter night, during which they encounter a great horned owl. While the text does not specify the child's gender, the jacket flap copy refers to the characters as "a little girl and her father". According to Yolen's website, the child is actually Yolen's daughter Heidi. The "Pa" character is based on her husband, David, who was an avid outdoorsman and birdwatcher and to whom Yolen credits her awareness of nature.

Awards
Preceded by Hey, Al	Caldecott Medal recipient 1988	Succeeded by Song and Dance Man
