= The Devil's Arithmetic (film) =

- Based on: The Devil's Arithmetic by Jane Yolen
- Screenplay by: Robert J. Avrech
- Directed by: Donna Deitch
- Starring: Kirsten Dunst; Brittany Murphy; Paul Freeman; Mimi Rogers; Louise Fletcher
- Music by: Frédéric Talgorn
- Country of origin: United States
- Original language: English

Production
- Producers: Lee Gottsegen; Tom Kuhn; Murray Schisgal; Fred Weintraub
- Running time: 95 minutes
- Production company: Punch Productions

Original release
- Network: Showtime
- Release: March 28, 1999

The Devil's Arithmetic is a 1999 historical fantasy TV movie based on the novel of the same name by Jane Yolen. It stars Kirsten Dunst as Hannah Stern and costars Brittany Murphy, Louise Fletcher, and Mimi Rogers. Dustin Hoffman introduces the film but is uncredited and serves as an executive producer with Mimi Rogers.

== Plot ==
Hannah, a teen girl, visits a tattoo parlor with her friends, contemplating what tattoo she wants. Before she can decide, she notes the time and realizes she is late for a Passover dinner. Hannah hates going to her family seder as her family tells the same stories and Hannah is tired of hearing about the past. Her aunt tells her every year that Hannah looks like her namesake, Chaya, but won't tell Hannah who Chaya was or what she did. During the seder Hannah opens the front door to let in the prophet Elijah, but she sees a Polish village instead of the outside of the apartment. All of a sudden she is not only in a new place but also in 1941.

Hannah learns she is in the home of Rivka, who says she is Hannah (now Chaya)'s cousin, and her aunt Gitl. They tell Hannah she has been sick with cholera and that should explain her strange ramblings about the future. The next day, the family goes into the village for a wedding, which is interrupted by Nazi soldiers, who say the whole village will be resettled, burning their synagogue as they leave. After a long journey, they arrive at a Nazi concentration camp. There, their valuables are stolen, their heads are shorn, they are tattooed, and they are made prisoners.

Life is brutal, but Hannah tells fairy tales and stories to the women in her bunk to keep their spirits up, and she insists that she knows what is coming because of her history classes in school, but no one believes her. Tensions rise when a family is revealed to have typhus and when a woman goes into labor, some of the men attempt an escape when they find a guard they think they can trust, only to be caught and executed via hanging.

One day, the commandant notices that Rivka and other inmates are ill, so he orders them to go to the gas chamber. Before he can see, Hannah switches places with Rivka. As she enters the gas chamber, she is transported back to the present day, awakening surrounded by her family, who tell her she had too much to drink. She embraces her aunt Eva and calls her Rivka, to her astonishment. They speak privately and Hannah fills in details she did not previously know. The family sings traditional songs at the table – the teenage Hannah is no longer alienated but is now part of the family.

== Production ==
The film was shot in Vilnius, Lithuania in fall 1998 and a concentration camp set was built before shooting began and was designed to resemble Auschwitz.

== Cast ==
- Kirsten Dunst as Hannah Stern/Chana Abramowicz
- Brittany Murphy as Rivka
- Paul Freeman as Rabbi
- Mimi Rogers as Leonore Stern
- Louise Fletcher as Aunt Eva
- Daniel Brocklebank as Shmuel
- Shelly Skandrani as Leah
- Philip Rham as Commandant Krieger
- Daniel Rausch as Sgt. Steinbach
- Kristy McFarland as Yetta
- Nitzan Sharron as Ariel
- Rachel Roddy as Esther
- Ives Jackevičiūtė as Miriam
- Vaidotas Martinaitis as Hans
- Nijolė Narmontaitė as Hedwig
- Leonardas Pobedonoscevas as Isaac
- Louis Negin as Uncle Morris
- Caterina Scorsone as Jessica
