= Feenie Ziner =

American author and educator

- Born: Florence Katz; March 22, 1921; Brooklyn, New York, US
- Died: December 13, 2012 (aged 91); Branford, Connecticut, US
- Education: Columbia University (MSS); Brooklyn College (BA)
- Occupations: Novelist, educator
- Spouse: Zeke Ziner
- Writing career
- Language: English
- Genre: Children's literature

Florence "Feenie" Ziner (March 22, 1921 — December 13, 2012) was an American author and educator specializing in children's literature. She taught English literature and creative writing at the University of Connecticut for 20 years before retiring in 1994. Her first book for young children, The Book of Time, sold more than half a million copies.

== Life and career ==
Ziner was born Florence Katz in Brooklyn, New York, to first-generation Americans Morris and Sophie (Guttman) Katz. Her father was a diamond merchant. She attended public schools in New York City and received her Bachelor of Arts degree from Brooklyn College in 1941 and her master's degree from the Columbia University School of Social Work in 1944. She married Zeke Ziner, an artist and sculptor, on September 17, 1941. They had five children: Marc, Joe, Amie, Ted, and Eric. The couple moved to Chicago immediately following World War II, where Ziner worked several years as a psychiatric social worker.

She left her social work career to try her hand at writing, publishing her first book for children in 1956. Following her husband's career, Ziner moved to Dobbs Ferry, New York, from 1958 to 1966. The family next moved to Montreal, where Ziner reviewed children's books for the Montreal Star and taught contemporary literature at Sir George Williams University and McGill University from 1967 to 1970. Returning to Dobbs Ferry in 1970, she reviewed children's books for The New York Times Book Review from 1970 to 1974 and taught at the New School for Social Research and at SUNY Purchase from 1971 to 1973. Offered a temporary job teaching in the Department of English at the University of Connecticut in Storrs in 1974, Ziner accepted the position and ended up staying for 20 years, retiring as a professor emerita in 1994.

In addition to her books for children and adults, Ziner contributed to Canadian Magazine, Parents, American Journal of Psychoanalysis, Redbook, Good Housekeeping, and other journals and magazines. Her papers are held at the University of Connecticut's Archives and Special Collections, to which she donated them in 1999.

Ziner died of Alzheimer's disease in Branford, Connecticut, at the age of 91. Her husband predeceased her. All five of their children survived their parents.

== Published books ==
- (With E. S. Thompson) The Book of Time, Children's Press, 1956, published as Time, Grosset, 1959 (published in England as The Junior Book of Time, Muller, 1959).
- Hiding, Golden Gate, 1957.
- Little Sailor's Big Pet, Parnassus, 1958.
- Wonderful Wheels, Melmont, 1959.
- Pilgrims and Plymouth Colony, American Heritage, 1961.
- (With Paul Galdone) Counting Carnival, Coward, 1962.
- Dark Pilgrim, Chilton, 1965.
- A Guide to Expo, Tundra Books, 1967.
- A Full House, Simon & Schuster, 1967.
- Bluenose, Queen of the Grand Banks, Chilton, 1970.
- The Duck of Billingsgate Market, Four Winds Press, 1974.
- Cricket Boy: A Chinese Tale Retold, Doubleday, 1978.
- Within This Wilderness, Norton, 1978.
- Squanto, Linnet Books (Hamden, CT), 1988.
- (Editor) The Small Press in Connecticut, Two Ninety One-0-Two (Storrs, CT), 1990.
