= Leo Lionni =

Dutch-Italian artist and children's writer

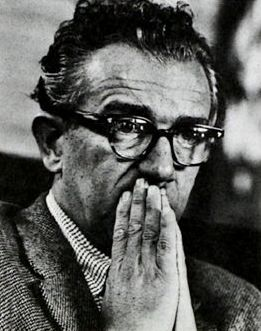
- Born: May 5, 1910; Amsterdam
- Died: October 11, 1999 (aged 89); Radda in Chianti
- Occupation: Graphic designer, illustrator, painter, children's writer, designer, picture book writer, graphic artist
- Awards: Prix Janusz Korczak de Littérature Jeunesse (2015)
- Website: www.rhcbooks.com/authors/17763/leo-lionni/about

Leo Lionni (May 5, 1910 – October 11, 1999) was an American writer and illustrator of children's books. Born in the Netherlands, he moved to Italy and lived there before moving to the United States in 1939, where he worked as an art director for several advertising agencies, and then for Fortune magazine. Lionni returned to Italy in 1962 and started writing and illustrating children's books. That same year his book Inch by Inch was awarded the Lewis Carroll Shelf Award.

== Family ==
Lionni was born in Amsterdam but spent two years in Philadelphia before moving to Italy as a teenager. His father worked as an accountant and his mother was an opera singer. His father was assigned to an office in Italy part way through Leo's time in high school. He married Nora Maffi, the daughter of Fabrizio Maffi, a founder of the Italian Communist Party, and they had two sons, Louis and Paolo, grandchildren Pippo and Annie and Sylvan, and great-grandchildren Madeline, Luca, Sam, Nick, Alix, Henry, and Theo.

Lonni died on October 11, 1999, at his home in Tuscany, Italy, at age 89.

== Career ==
From 1931 to 1939, Lionni was a well-known and respected painter in Italy, where he worked in the Futurism and avant-garde styles. In 1935, Lionni received a degree in economics from the University of Genoa. During the later part of this period, he devoted himself more and more to advertising design.

In 1939, Lionni moved to Philadelphia and began full-time work in advertising, at which he was extremely successful, acquiring accounts from Ford Motors and Chrysler Plymouth, among others. Lionni commissioned art from Saul Steinberg, the then neophyte Andy Warhol, Alexander Calder, Willem de Kooning, and Fernand Léger. He was a member of the Advertising Art Hall of Fame.

In 1948, Lionni accepted a position as art director for Fortune, which he held until 1960. Lionni also maintained outside clients, designing The Family of Man catalogue design for the Museum of Modern Art, and was design director for Olivetti, for whom he produced ads, brochures and showroom design.

In 1962, Lionni moved back to Italy, and began his career as a children's book author and illustrator. He produced more than 40 children's books. Lionni received the 1984 American Institute of Graphic Arts (A.I.G.A.) Gold Medal and was a four-time Caldecott Honor Winner—for Inch by Inch (1961), Swimmy (1964), Frederick (1968), and Alexander and the Wind-Up Mouse (1970). He also won the Deutscher Jugendliteraturpreis in 1965.

Over the course of his career, Lionni also held several teaching posts, beginning in 1946, when he taught advertising art at Black Mountain College. Lionni also taught at Parsons School of Design in 1954; the Institute of Design in Ahmedabad, India, in 1967; the University of Illinois in 1967; and Cooper Union from 1982 to 1985.

Lionni always thought of himself as an artist. He worked in many disciplines including, especially, drawing, painting, sculpture and photography. Lionni had one-man shows in the United States, Europe, Asia and the Middle East. He continued to work as an artist until just before his death in 1999.

== Children's author and illustrator ==
Lionni became the first children's author/illustrator to use collage as the main medium for his illustrations. Reviewers such as Booklist and School Library Journal have said that Lionni's illustrations are "bold, sumptuous collages" that include "playful patches of color" and that his "beautifully simple [and] boldly graphic art [is] perfect to share with very young children." Book World said that "the translucent color of the pictures and the simplicity of the text make a perfect combination." Many of Lionni's books deal with issues of community and creativity, and the existential condition, rendered as fables which appealed to children. He participated in workshops with children and even after his death school children continue to honor him by making their own versions of his books.

Lionni would usually draw pictures as he told stories to his grandchildren, but one time, Lionni found himself on a long train ride with no drawing materials. Instead, Lionni tore out circles of yellow and blue from a magazine to help him tell the story he had in mind. This experience led him to create his first book for children, Little Blue and Little Yellow (1959).

Lionni uses earth tones in his illustrations that are close to the actual colors of the objects found in nature. In his book Inch by Inch, for example, Lionni uses realistic shades of brown and burnt orange in his collage of a robin, while the tree branches are shades of brown with dark green leaves. Mice are consistently found as characters in his books, such as the star character in Frederick and the title character in the Caldecott Honor Book Alexander and the Wind-Up Mouse. Lionni's illustrations have been compared to those of Eric Carle as both often employ animals, birds, insects, and other creatures to tell a story about what it is to be human.

== Parallel Botany ==
Among Lionni's books that were not intended for children, the best known is probably Parallel Botany (1978; first published in Italian as La botanica parallela, 1976). This detailed treatise on plants that lack materiality—in other words, imaginary plants—is richly illustrated with drawings of plants in charcoal or pencil and photographs of "parallel botanists". The text is a rich mix of plant descriptions, travel tales, "ancient" myths, and folk etymologies, leavened with historical facts and grounded in actual science. As an imaginary taxonomy, it is invoked by Italo Calvino as a precursor to the Codex Seraphinianus of Luigi Serafini.

== Art collector ==
Lionni's art collection included Georg Grosz's Self Portrait with a Model, which he acquired from Carel von Lier in 1938 and donated to the Museum of Modern Art in 1954.

== Bibliography ==
=== Children's books ===
- Little Blue and Little Yellow (1959) (a New York Times Best Illustrated Children's Book of the Year, 1959)
- Inch by Inch (1960)
- On My Beach There are Many Pebbles (1961)
- Swimmy (1963) (named by the National Education Association one of its "Teachers' Top 100 Books for Children" based on a 2007 online poll)
- Tico and the Golden Wings (1964)
- Frederick (1967) (listed by the National Education Association as one of its "Teachers' Top 100 Books for Children" based on a 2007 online poll)
- The Alphabet Tree (1968)
- The Biggest House in the World (1968)
- Alexander and the Wind-up Mouse (1969)
- Fish is Fish (1970)
- Theodore and the Talking Mushroom (1971)
- The Greentail Mouse (1973)
- In the Rabbitgarden (1975)
- Pezzettino (1975)
- A Color of His Own (1976)
- I Want to Stay Here! I Want to Go There!: A Flea Story (1977)
- Geraldine, the Music Mouse (1979)
- Let's Make Rabbits (1980)
- Cornelius (1983)
- It's Mine (1985)
- Nicolas, Where Have You Been? (1987)
- Six Crows (1988)
- Tillie and the Wall (1989)
- Matthew's Dream (1991)
- A Busy Year (1992)
- Mr. McMouse (1992)
- An Extraordinary Egg (1994)

=== Other works ===
- Between Worlds (autobiography)
- The Book of Ma
- Design for the Printed Page
- Parallel Botany

=== Books for younger children ===
- Mouse Days: A Book of Seasons (1981)
- What?: Pictures to Talk About (1983)
- When?: Pictures to Talk About (1983)
- Where?: Pictures to Talk About (1983)
- Who?: Pictures to Talk About (1983)
- Colors to Talk About (1985)
- Letters to Talk About (1985)
- Numbers to Talk About (1985)
- Words to Talk About (1985)
- Let's Play (1993)
