= The Devil's Arithmetic (novel) =

1988 children's time slip novel by Jane Yolen

- Author: Jane Yolen
- Genre: Science fiction, fantasy, time slip
- Publisher: Viking Kestrel
- Publication date: 1988
- Publication place: United States of America
- ISBN: 0-670-81027-4

The Devil's Arithmetic is a historical fiction time slip novel written by American author Jane Yolen and published in 1988. The book is about Hannah Stern; a Jewish girl, while at a Passover Seder dinner, is sent back in time to 1942 Poland during World War II. Hannah experiences the Holocaust horrors and is sent to a concentration camp and learns the importance of knowing about the past.

== Background ==
Author Jane Yolen, who is Jewish, noted that she had considered writing about the Holocaust for some time, but was overwhelmed. She was convinced to pursue the subject by an editor of hers at the time, who was a Rabbi's wife. The Devil's Arithmetic is the author's first book that deals explicitly with Jewish themes.

While writing the novel, Yolen spent a week at an Indianapolis private school; when she explained to students about her forthcoming work, one student asked if Yolen had made up the events of the novel, based on the real story of the Holocaust.

== Plot ==
Hannah Stern is a Jewish preteen girl living in the present day. She is bored by her relative's stories about the past, is not looking forward to the Passover Seder, and is tired of her religion. When Hannah symbolically opens the door for the prophet Elijah, she is transported back in time to a shtetl on the Polish/German border in 1942, during World War II. Hannah is not immediately aware of the time period.

At that time and place, the people believe she is Chaya Abramowicz, who is recovering from cholera, the fever that killed Chaya's parents a few months ago. The strange remarks Hannah/Chaya makes about the future and her inability to recognize Chaya's aunt Gitl and uncle Shmuel are blamed on the fever.

At Uncle Shmuel's wedding, the Nazis come to transport the entire population of the village to a death camp near Donavin, and only Hannah knows all the terrors they will face: starvation, mistreatment, forced labor, and finally execution.

Hannah and the other women are stripped, shaved, and tattooed with a number. Hannah and the other women are forced to dig trenches in the camp. Hannah struggles to survive at the camp, with the help of a girl named Rivka. Uncle Shmuel and some other men try to escape; the men are caught and then shot as everyone watches. Fayge, who was going to be married to Shmuel, is killed because she runs to Shmuel when he is about to be shot with the men that were caught. Yitzchak escapes and lives in the forest with the partisans, fighting the Germans.

Later, when Hannah, Rivka, Esther, and Shifre are working, a guard overhears them talking instead of working. Shifre tries to reassure the guard they have been working, but he takes them anyway and leaves Hannah by herself. As the three are about to leave, Hannah takes Rivka's place by putting on her babushka. Since the guards don't know their faces, this goes unnoticed by the officer. The girls are led to the gas chamber. Hannah is then transported back to her family's Seder. Aunt Eva calls her over. Hannah looks at Aunt Eva's number; it is the same as Rivka's. Hannah (when she was Chaya) was really the girl she was named after, Rivka was Aunt Eva, and Rivka's brother, Wolfe, was Grandpa Will. (Aunt Eva said that they changed their names when they got to America.)

The epilogue at the end of the novel reveals that when the camp was liberated, the survivors were Gitl (weighing a mere 73 pounds [33 kg]), Yitzchak, Rivka, and Leye (a worker in the camp) and her baby. Gitl and Yitzchak reunite and immigrate to Israel where Yitzchak becomes a politician while Gitl organizes a rescue mission that is dedicated to salvaging the lives of young survivors and locating family members. The organization is named after Chaya, her niece that died a hero.

== Themes ==
Hannah experiences a time slip to experience the past. The novel employs time travel as a plot device and both a method for remembering and for the reader to more deeply feel the story. Yolen believed children would be more likely to engage with the past if the novel featured a contemporary child who went back in time and experienced history themselves.

== Reception ==
The Devil's Arithmetic received a starred review from Kirkus, which called it "a triumphantly moving book". Publishers Weekly called the book "brave and powerful".

In The New York Times, Cynthia Samuels said that Yolen's use of the time travel convention was brought to "a new and ambitious level".

The Devil's Arithmetic was nominated for the Nebula award for best novella in 1988 and won the National Jewish Book Award (in the children's literature category) in 1989. The script for the television movie was also nominated for a Nebula Award.

== Adaptations ==
The novel was adapted into a 1999 Showtime television film with the same title, starring Kirsten Dunst and Brittany Murphy.
