= Diane Wolkstein =

Diane Wolkstein (November 11, 1942 – January 31, 2013) was a folklorist and author of children's books. She was New York City's official storyteller from 1967 to 1971.

== Biography ==
As New York's official storyteller beginning in 1967, Wolkstein visited two of the city's parks each weekday, staging hundreds of one-woman storytelling events. After successfully talking her way into the position, she said she realized "there was no margin for error" in a 1992 interview. "I mean, it was a park. [The children would] just go somewhere else if they didn't like it."

She also had a radio show on WNYC, Stories From Many Lands, from 1968 until 1980, and she helped to create the Storytelling Center of New York City.

Wolkstein wrote two dozen books, primarily collections of folk tales and legends she gathered during research trips. She made many visits to China, Haiti and Africa. She collaborated with the Assyriologist Samuel Noah Kramer to translate Inanna, Queen of Heaven and Earth, the story of Inanna, the Sumerian goddess of fertility, love and war.

The Library of Congress houses an archive of Wolkstein's photographs, performance events and productions, interviews and other materials.

== Personal life ==
Wolkstein was born in Newark, New Jersey, and grew up in Maplewood, New Jersey. Her father, Henry, was an accountant and her mother, Ruth, was a librarian. She received a bachelor's degree from Smith College and a master's degree in education from Bank Street College of Education. While living in Paris, she studied mime under Étienne Decroux. She had a daughter, Rachel Zucker.

Wolkstein was in Taiwan to research a book of Chinese folk stories when she underwent emergency surgery for a heart condition. She died in the city of Kaohsiung at the age of 70.
