= Jane Yolen =

American writer (1939–2026)

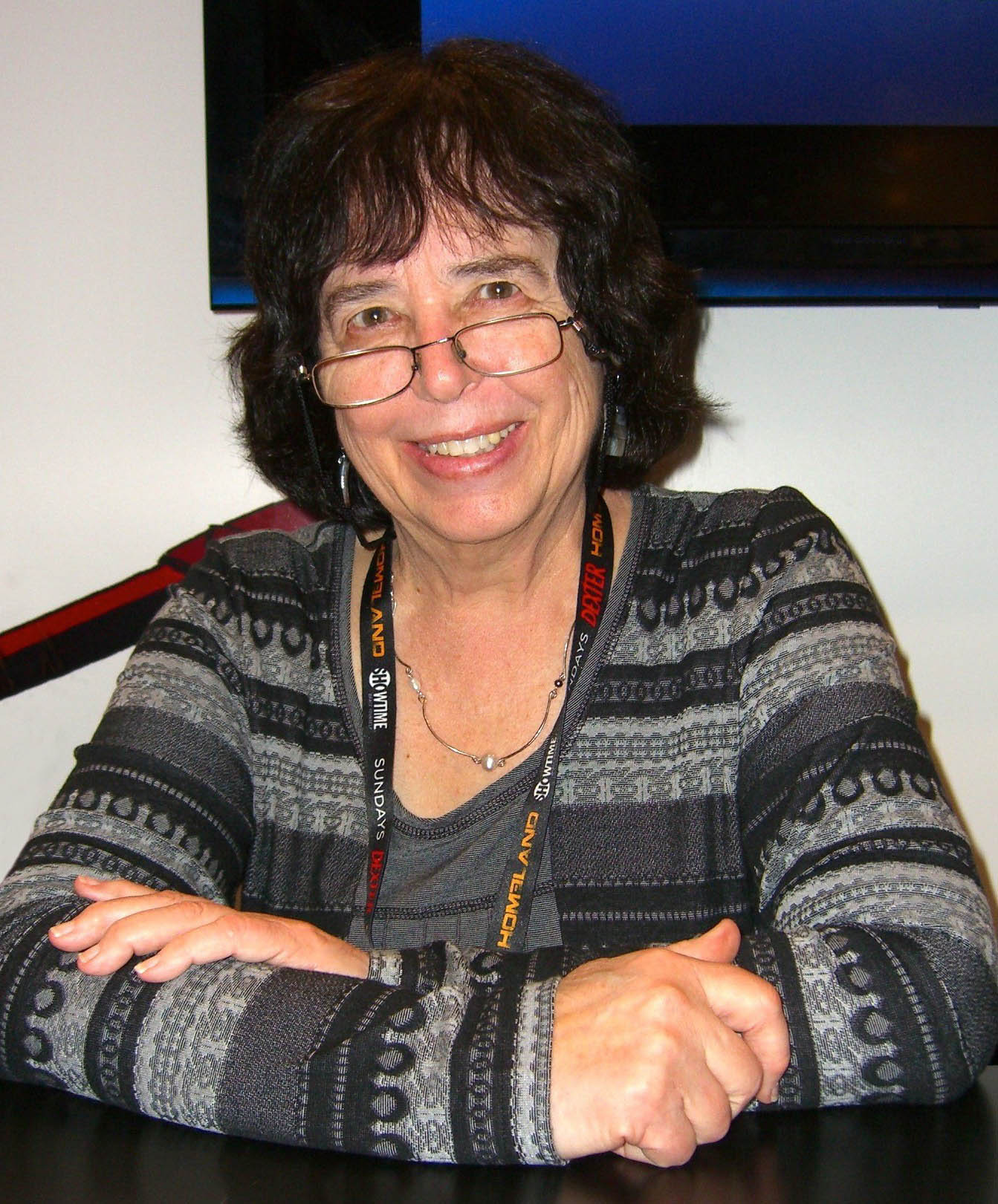
- Yolen in 2011
- Born: February 11, 1939; New York City, U.S.
- Died: June 11, 2026 (aged 87); Hatfield, Massachusetts, U.S.
- Education: Smith College
- Occupations: Writer, poet
- Writing career
- Period: 1960s–2026
- Genres: Fantasy, science fiction, folklore, children's fiction
- Notable awards: World Fantasy Award for Life Achievement
- Website: janeyolen.com

Jane Hyatt Yolen (February 11, 1939 – June 11, 2026) was an American writer of fantasy, science fiction and children's books best known for The Devil's Arithmetic, a Holocaust novella. Her other works include the Nebula Award–winning short works "Sister Emily's Lightship" and "Lost Girls", Owl Moon, The Emperor and the Kite, and the Commander Toad series. She also worked as an editor and collaborated on works with all three of her children, most extensively with Adam Stemple.

Yolen delivered the inaugural Alice G. Smith Lecture at the University of South Florida in 1989. In 2012 she became the first woman to give the Andrew Lang lecture. Yolen published her 400th book in early 2021, Bear Outside. Her 450th (and final) book, Terror Birds, was published posthumously on July 14, 2026.

== Early life ==
Jane Hyatt Yolen was born on February 11, 1939, at Beth Israel Medical Center in Manhattan. She was the first child of Isabell Berlin Yolen, a psychiatric social worker who became a full-time mother and homemaker upon Yolen's birth, and Will Hyatt Yolen, a journalist who wrote columns at the time for New York newspapers. Her father, William (Wolf), was born in Katerynoslav (present day Dnipro, Ukraine) into the family of Samson and Mina Iolin, who were engaged in the manufacture of kerosene lamps. In 1914, the Iolin family emigrated to the United States in full, later settling in New Haven.

Both of Yolen's parents were Jewish and raised her secular-Jewish. Isabell also did volunteer work, and wrote short stories in her spare time. However, she was not able to sell them. Because the Hyatts, the family of Yolen's grandmother, Mina Hyatt Yolen, only had girls, a number of the children of Yolen's generation were given their last name as a middle name in order to perpetuate it.

When Yolen was barely one year old, the family moved to California to accommodate Will's new job working for Hollywood film studios, doing publicity on films such as American Tragedy and Knute Rockne, All American. The family moved back to New York City prior to the birth of Yolen's brother, Steve. When Will joined the Army as a Second Lieutenant to fight in England during World War II, Yolen, her mother and brother lived with her grandparents, Danny and Dan, in Newport News, Virginia. After the war, the family moved back to Manhattan, living on Central Park West and 97th Street until Yolen turned 13. She attended PS 93, where she enjoyed writing and singing, and became friends with future radio presenter Susan Stamberg. She also engaged writing by creating a newspaper for her apartment with her brother that she sold for five cents a copy. She was accepted to Music and Art High School. During the summer prior to that semester, she attended a Vermont summer camp, which was her first involvement with the Society of Friends (Quakers). Her family also moved to a ranch house in Westport, Connecticut, where she attended Bedford Junior high for ninth grade, and then Staples High School. She received a BA from Smith College in 1960, majoring in Russian and English literature and minoring in religion, and a master's degree in Education from the University of Massachusetts in 1978. After graduating she moved back to New York City.

== Career ==
Yolen considered herself a poet and a journalist/nonfiction writer, and she became a children's book writer to her own surprise. She sold her first published book, Pirates in Petticoats, on her 22nd birthday, February 11, 1961.

During the 1960s, Yolen held editorial positions at various magazines and publishers in New York City, including Gold Medal Books, Routledge Books, and Alfred A. Knopf Juvenile Books (from 1963). In the mid-1960s, Yolen, her husband, and their infant daughter moved to Hatfield, in western Massachusetts, and Yolen began working at the UMass Amherst computer center. She was an early member of the Society of Children's Book Writers and Illustrators (founded 1971). In the 1980s, she founded the Western Massachusetts Illustrators Group, and she served as president of the Science Fiction Writers of America from 1986 to 1988. From 1990 to 1996 she ran her own young adult fiction imprint, Jane Yolen Books, at Harcourt Brace.

Yolen co-wrote two books with her son, the writer and musician Adam Stemple, Pay the Piper and Troll Bridge, both part of the Rock 'n' Roll Fairy Tale series. She also wrote lyrics for the song "Robin's Complaint," recorded on the 1994 album Antler Dance by Stemple's band Boiled in Lead.

Yolen published her 300th book in 2010, and her 365th and 366th books on the same day in 2018. By 2021, she had written more than 400 books. At the time of Yolen's death, her daughter, children's book writer Heidi Stemple, reported that she had completed her 450th book, and People announced a posthumous release date of July 14, 2026.

== Personal life and death ==
In 1962, Yolen married David W. Stemple. They had three children—photographer Jason Stemple in addition to Adam the musician and Heidi the author—and six grandchildren. David Stemple died in March 2006.

Yolen owned a house in Scotland, where she lived for a few months each year. She died at her home in Hatfield, Massachusetts on June 11, 2026, at the age of 87.

== Awards ==
- 1968 Caldecott Honor Book for The Emperor and the Kite
- 1987 Special World Fantasy Award (for Favorite Folktales From Around the World)
- 1988 Caldecott Medal winner for Owl Moon
- 1989 Sydney Taylor Book Award for Older Readers (for The Devil's Arithmetic)
- 1992 The Catholic Library Association's Regina Medal (for her body of children's literature)
- 1997 Nebula Award for Short Story (for "Sister Emily's Lightship")
- 1998 Nebula Award for Novelette (for "Lost Girls")
- 2006 Locus Award for Best Young Adult Book (for Pay the Piper)
- 2009 World Fantasy Award for Life Achievement at the 2010 World Fantasy Convention. A panel of judges selects about two people annually.
- 2010 SFPA Grand Master award.
- 2017 Damon Knight Memorial Grand Master Award
- 2018 World Fantasy Award for Anthology/Collection (for The Emerald Circus)

=== Nominations ===
- 1984 World Fantasy Award for Anthology/Collection (for Tales of Wonder)
- 1986 World Fantasy Award for Anthology/Collection (for Dragonfield and Other Stories)
- 1987 World Fantasy Award for Anthology/Collection (for Merlin's Booke)
- 1989 World Fantasy Award for Best Novella (for Briar Rose)
- 1993 World Fantasy Award for Best Novel (for The Devil's Arithmetic)
- 2009 Sydney Taylor Book Award Younger Reader Honor (for Naming Liberty, illustrated by Jim Burke)
- 2021 Sydney Taylor Book Award Picture Book Honor (for Miriam at the River, illustrated by Khoa Le)
