= Frank Herbert bibliography =

This is a list of works by the science fiction author Frank Herbert.

== Fiction ==
=== Dune ===
1. Dune: Serial publication: Analog, December 1963 – February 1964 (Part I, as "Dune World"), and January – May 1965 (Parts II and III, as "The Prophet of Dune"). First edition: Philadelphia: Chilton Books, 1965.
2. Dune Messiah: Serial publication: Galaxy, July – November 1969. First edition: New York: G.P. Putnam's Sons, 1969.
3. Children of Dune: Serial publication: Analog, January – April 1976. First edition: New York: G.P. Putnam's Sons, 1976.
4. God Emperor of Dune, New York: G.P. Putnam's Sons, 1981.
5. Heretics of Dune, New York: G.P. Putnam's Sons, 1984.
6. Chapterhouse: Dune, New York: G.P. Putnam's Sons, 1985.
7. "The Road to Dune", 1985 (short story collected in Eye)

=== The Pandora Sequence (also known as the WorShip series) ===
1. Destination: Void: Serial publication: Galaxy, August 1965, as "Do I Wake or Dream?" First edition: New York: Berkeley, 1966 revised in 1978.
2. The Jesus Incident (with Bill Ransom): Serial publication: Analog, February 1979, G.P. Putnam's Sons, 1979.
3. The Lazarus Effect (with Bill Ransom), New York: G.P. Putnam's Sons, 1983.
4. The Ascension Factor (with Bill Ransom), New York: G.P. Putnam's Sons, 1988.

=== The ConSentiency series ===
1. "A Matter of Traces" (1958): short story collected in Eye
2. "The Tactful Saboteur" (1964): short story collected in Eye
3. Whipping Star: Serial publication: Worlds of If, January – April 1970. First edition: New York: G.P. Putnam's Sons, 1970.
4. The Dosadi Experiment: Serial publication: Galaxy, May – August 1977 "The Dosadi Experiment". First edition: New York: G.P. Putnam's Sons, 1977.

=== Standalone novels ===
- The Dragon in the Sea: Serial publication: Astounding, November 1955 – January 1956. First edition: New York: Doubleday, 1956. Also titled Under Pressure and 21st Century Sub.
- The Green Brain: Serial publication: Amazing, March 1965, under the title "Greenslaves." First edition: New York: Ace, 1966.
- The Eyes of Heisenberg: Serial publication: Galaxy, June – August 1966, as "Heisenberg's Eyes." First edition: New York: Berkeley, 1966.
- The Heaven Makers: Serial publication: Amazing, April – June 1967. First edition: New York: Avon, 1968
- The Santaroga Barrier: Serial publication: Amazing, October 1967 – February 1968. First edition: New York: Berkeley, 1968
- Soul Catcher, New York: G.P. Putnam's Sons, 1972.
- The Godmakers: Serial publication: "You Take the High Road", Astounding, May 1958, "Missing Link", Astounding, February 1959, "Operation Haystack", Astounding, May 1959 and "The Priests of Psi" Fantastic, February 1960. First edition: New York: G.P. Putnam's Sons, 1972.
- Hellstrom's Hive: Serial publication: Galaxy, November 1972 – March 1973, "Project 40." First edition: New York: Doubleday, 1973.
- Direct Descent: Serial publication: Astounding, December 1954, "Packrat Planet". First edition: New York: Ace Books, 1980.
- The White Plague, New York: G.P. Putnam's Sons, 1982.
- Man of Two Worlds (with Brian Herbert), New York: G.P. Putnam's Sons, 1986.
- High-Opp: WordFire Press, 2012.
- Angels' Fall: WordFire Press, 2013.
- A Game of Authors: WordFire Press, 2013.
- A Thorn in the Bush: WordFire Press, 2014.

=== Short fiction collections ===
- The Worlds of Frank Herbert, London: New English Library, 1970.
- The Book of Frank Herbert, New York: DAW Books, 1973.
- The Best of Frank Herbert, London: Sidgwick & Jackson, 1975.
- The Priests of Psi, London: Gollancz Ltd, 1980.
- Eye (Jim Burns, illustrator), New York: Berkeley, 1985.
- The Collected Stories of Frank Herbert, New York: Tor Books, 2014.
- Unpublished Stories, WordFire Press, 2016.

=== Short fiction ===
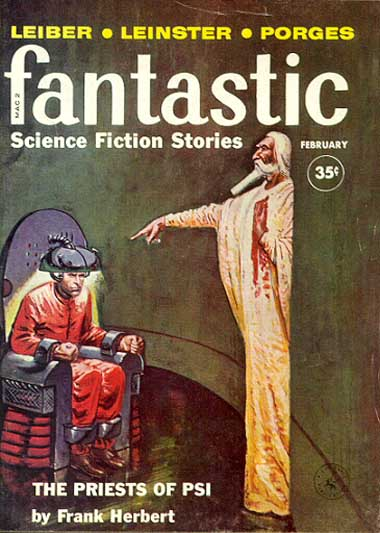
Herbert's novella "The Priests of Psi" was the cover story for the February 1960 issue of Fantastic

- "Survival of the Cunning," Esquire, March 1945.
- "The Jonah and the Jap," Doc Savage, April 1946.
- "Yellow Fire," Alaska Life (Alaska Territorial Magazine), June 1947.
- "Looking for Something?" Startling Stories, April 1952.
- "Operation Syndrome," Astounding, June 1954. also in T.E. Dikty's Best Science Fiction Stories and Novels, 1955 series
- "The Gone Dogs," Amazing, November 1954.
- "Packrat Planet," Astounding, December 1954.
- "Rat Race," Astounding, July 1955.
- "Occupation Force," Fantastic, August 1955.
- "The Nothing," Fantastic Universe, January 1956.
- "Cease Fire," Astounding, January 1956.
- "Old Rambling House," Galaxy, April 1958.
- "You Take the High Road," Astounding, May 1958.
- "A Matter of Traces," Fantastic Universe, November 1958.
- "Missing Link," Astounding, February 1959. also in Author's Choice, ed. Harry Harrison, New York: Berkeley, 1968.
- "Operation Haystack," Astounding, May 1959.
- "The Priests of Psi," Fantastic, February 1960.
- "Egg and Ashes," Worlds of If, November 1960.
- "A-W-F Unlimited", Galaxy, June 1961.
- "Try to Remember," Amazing, October 1961.
- "Mating Call", Galaxy, October 1961.
- "Mindfield," Amazing, March 1962.
- "The Mary Celeste Move," Analog, October 1964.
- "The Tactful Saboteur," Galaxy, October 1964.
- "Greenslaves," Amazing, March 1965.
- "Committee of the Whole", Galaxy, April 1965.
- "The GM Effect," Analog, June 1965.
- "Do I Wake or Dream?" Galaxy, August 1965.
- "The Primitives", Galaxy, April 1966.
- "Escape Felicity," Analog, June 1966.
- "By the Book," Analog, August 1966.
- "The Featherbedders," Analog, August 1967.
- "The Mind Bomb" (aka "The Being Machine"), Worlds of If, October 1969.
- "Seed Stock," Analog, April 1970.
- "Murder Will In," The Magazine of Fantasy and Science Fiction, May 1970.
- "Project 40" (three installments) (novelized as "Hellstrom's Hive"), Galaxy, November 1972 – March 1973.
- "Encounter in a Lonely Place," The Book of Frank Herbert, New York: DAW Books, 1973.
- "Gambling Device," The Book of Frank Herbert New York, DAW Books, 1973.
- "Passage for Piano," The Book of Frank Herbert New York, DAW Books, 1973.
- "The Death of a City," Future City, ed. Roger Elwood. Trident Press: New York, 1973.
- "Come to the Party" with F. M. Busby, Analog, December 1978.
- "Songs of a Sentient Flute", Analog, February 1979. (Ghost written by Bill Ransom)
- "Frogs and Scientists," Destinies, Ace Books, August–September 1979.
- "Feathered Pigs," Destinies, Ace Books, October–December 1979.
- "The Road to Dune," Eye, New York: Berkeley 1985.
- "The Daddy Box", The Collected Stories of Frank Herbert, New York: Tor 2014.
- "The Yellow Coat", Fiction River: Pulse Pounders, WMG Publishing 2015.
- "The Cage", Unpublished Stories, WordFire Press, 2016.
- "The Illegitimate Stage", Unpublished Stories, WordFire Press, 2016.
- "A Lesson in History", Unpublished Stories, WordFire Press, 2016.
- "Wilfred", Unpublished Stories, WordFire Press, 2016.
- "The Iron Maiden", Unpublished Stories, WordFire Press, 2016.
- "The Wrong Cat", Unpublished Stories, WordFire Press, 2016.
- "The Heat's On", Unpublished Stories, WordFire Press, 2016.
- "The Little Window", Unpublished Stories, WordFire Press, 2016.
- "The Waters of Kan-E", Unpublished Stories, WordFire Press, 2016.
- "Paul's Friend", Unpublished Stories, WordFire Press, 2016.
- "Public Hearing", Unpublished Stories, WordFire Press, 2016.

== Nonfiction ==
=== Nonfiction books ===
- New World or No World (editor), New York: Ace Books, 1970 (paper).
- Threshold: The Blue Angels Experience, New York: Ballantine, 1973 (paper). Companion to documentary of same name about Blue Angels flight team.
- Without Me, You're Nothing (with Max Barnard), New York: Pocket Books, 1981 (hardcover).
- The Maker of Dune: insights of a master of science fiction, New York, Berkley Books, 1987 (paper). Edited by Tim O'Reilly.
- The Home Computer Handbook, Frank Herbert, Max Barnard - Ed.: Gollancz, 1981, 297 pag. - ISBN 9780575030503.

=== Essays and introductions ===
- Introduction to Saving Worlds, by Roger Elwood and Virginia Kidd. New York: Doubleday, 1973. Reissued by Bantam Books as The Wounded Planet.
- "Introduction: Tomorrow's Alternatives?" in Frontiers 1: Tomorrow's Alternatives, ed. Roger Elwood. New York: Macmillan, 1973.

Reprinted as "Doll Factory, Gun Factory" in The Maker of Dune.

- Introduction to Tomorrow and Tomorrow and Tomorrow. Heitz, Herbert, Joor McGee. New York: Holt, Rinehart and Winston, 1973.
- "Listening to the Left Hand", Harper's Magazine, December 1973, pp. 92 – 100.
- "Science Fiction and a World Crisis" in Science Fiction: Today and Tomorrow, ed. Reginald Bretnor. New York: Harper and Row, 1974.
- "Men on Other Planets", The Craft of Science Fiction, ed. Reginald Bretnor. New York: Harper and Row, 1976.
- "The Sky is Going to Fall", in Seriatim: The Journal of Ecotopia, No. 2, Spring 1977, pp. 88 – 89. (slightly different article appeared in The San Francisco Examiner "Overview" column, July 4, 1976.)
- "The ConSentiency and How it Got That Way", Galaxy, May 1977 (may be considered as a fiction story and therefore in the "Original Single Story" section)
- "Dune Genesis", Omni, July 1980.

==== Significant newspaper articles ====
- "Flying Saucers: Fact or Farce?", San Francisco Sunday Examiner & Chronicle, people supplement, October 20, 1963.
- "2068 A.D.", San Francisco Sunday Examiner & Chronicle, California Living section, July 28, 1968.
- "We're Losing the Smog War" (part 1). San Francisco Sunday Examiner & Chronicle, California Living section, December 1, 1968.
- "Lying to Ourselves About Air" (part 2). San Francisco Sunday Examiner & Chronicle, California Living section, December 8, 1968.
- "You Can Go Home Again." San Francisco Sunday Examiner & Chronicle, California Living section, March 29, 1970. (Refers to some of Herbert's childhood experiences in the Northwest)
- "Overview," San Francisco Sunday Examiner & Chronicle, July 4, 1976.
- "New Lifestyle to Fit a World of Shortages." San Francisco Sunday Examiner & Chronicle, March 25, 1977

== Other publications ==
=== Poetry ===
- "Carthage: Reflections of a Martian", Mars, We Love You, ed. Jane Hipolito and Willis E. McNelly. New York: Doubleday, 1971.

=== As Editor ===
- Nebula Winners Fifteen (editor), New York: Harper & Row, 1981 (hardcover).

=== Audio recordings ===
- Sandworms of Dune, New York: Caedmon Records, 1978.
- Dune: The Banquet Scene, New York: Caedmon Records, 1979.
- The Battles of Dune, New York: Caedmon Records, 1979.
- The Truths of Dune "Fear is the Mindkiller", New York: Caedmon Records, 1979.

=== Interviews ===
- Interviews with Frank Herbert, Vertex, 1973, 1977.
- The Plowboy interview Frank Herbert, The Mother Earth News, May 1981.
- The Willis E. McNelly Interview with Frank Herbert, February 1969.
- A Talk with Frank Herbert, October 1981
