= The Collected Stories of Frank Herbert =

2014 short story collection by Frank Herbert

- Author: Frank Herbert
- Language: English
- Genre: Science fiction
- Publisher: Tor Books
- Publication date: 2014
- Publication place: United States
- Media type: Print (hardcover)
- Pages: 700 pp
- Preceded by: Eye (1985)

The Collected Stories of Frank Herbert is the sixth, and first posthumous, anthology of short science fiction stories by American author Frank Herbert, released by Tor Books on November 18, 2014.

== Stories ==
Title	Originally published in
"Introduction"	The Best of Frank Herbert (1975)
"Looking for Something?"	Startling Stories (1952)
"Operation Syndrome"	Astounding (1954)
"The Gone Dogs"	Amazing (1954)
"Pack Rat Planet"	Astounding (1954)
"Rat Race"	Astounding (1955)
"Occupation Force"	Fantastic (1955)
"The Nothing"	Fantastic Universe (1956)
"Cease Fire"	Astounding (1956)
"A Matter of Traces"	Fantastic Universe (1958)
"Old Rambling House"	Galaxy (1958)
"You Take the High Road"	Astounding (1958)
"Missing Link"	Astounding (1959)
"Operation Haystack"	Astounding (1959)
"The Priests of Psi"	Fantastic (1960)
"Egg and Ashes"	Worlds of If (1960)
"A-W-F Unlimited"	Galaxy (1961)
"Mating Call"	Galaxy (1961)
"Try to Remember"	Amazing (1961)
"Mindfield"	Amazing (1962)
"The Tactful Saboteur"	Galaxy (1964)
"Mary Celeste Move"	Analog (1964)
"Greenslaves"	Amazing (1965)
"Committee of the Whole"	Galaxy (1965)
"The GM Effect"	Analog (1965)
"The Primitives"	Galaxy (1966)
"Escape Felicity"	Analog (1966)
"By the Book"	Analog (1966)
"The Featherbedders"	Analog (1967)
"The Being Machine" (Originally "The Mind Bomb")	Worlds of If (1969)
"Seed Stock"	Analog (1970)
"Murder Will In"	The Magazine of Fantasy and Science Fiction (1970)
"Passage for Piano"	The Book of Frank Herbert (1973)
"Gambling Device"	The Book of Frank Herbert (1973)
"Encounter in a Lonely Place"	The Book of Frank Herbert (1973)
"Death of a City"	Future City (1973)
"Come to the Party"	Analog (1978)
"Songs of a Sentient Flute"	Analog (1979)
"Frogs and Scientists"	Destinies (1979)
"Feathered Pigs"	Destinies (1979)
"The Daddy Box"	Previously unpublished
