= Lurton Blassingame =

American literary agent (1904–1988)

Lurton Blassingame (February 10, 1904 – April 1988) was a literary agent of long career based in New York City, a Howard College- and Columbia University-trained journalist whose clients included Robert A. Heinlein and Frank Herbert.

== Early life and education ==
Blassingame was born on February 10, 1904, in Fort Smith, Arkansas, and moved with his family—he had a sister, Alice—afterward, to Auburn, Alabama, with his first university degree coming from Howard College in Birmingham. He moved to New York City, completing a master's degree in journalism from Columbia University. His Master's thesis focused on the history of pulp fiction.

== Career ==
Blassingame's first job was as a writer in Hollywood. While yet in his 20's (ca. 1929), he founded the agency that he would run for nearly 50 years, mostly in the borough of Manhattan in New York City. In 1937–1938, he and writer William Allen founded the American Library Foundation in California.

He saw a major success in 1943 representing Rosemary Taylor in the publication of Chicken Every Sunday, a best seller from McGraw-Hill (made into motion picture in 1948).

Blassingame's public relations operation, named Houston Branch Associates, was "one-man", and he sold it off in 1979—to Eleanor Wood, where it became part of Spectrum Literary Agency. He retired in 1980.

=== Clientele and dedications ===
In addition to Taylor, Blassingame served as literary agent for Robert A. Heinlein, Frank Herbert, Gerald Green, William F. Nolan, and John Barth.

Blassingame is, further, known to an extent through periodic author dedications. Robert A. Heinlein dedicated his 1951 science fiction work, The Puppet Masters, to him. Frank Herbert's first full-length novel set in the ConSentiency universe, and featuring Bureau of Sabotage agent Jorj X. McKie, the 1969-1970 Whipping Star, appeared with this dedication in the Putnam edition:

To Lurton Blassingame, who helped buy the time for this book, dedicated with affection and admiration[.]

In 1980, literary agent Kirby McCauley dedicated his horror anthology, Dark Forces, to Blassingame "with admiration and affection".

Robert Heinlein's posthumous 1989 book Grumbles from the Grave, which consists of his letters, features more to Blassingame than any other correspondent (as well as some of Blassingames' letters to him).

== Personal life and passing ==
Blassingame was married to the former Kathryn Shaw of Montgomery, Alabama, with whom he had a son, Lurton Wyatt Blassingame.

He was described by a close associate of decades, Margo Fischer, as being "full of life", with passions for fishing and hunting, as well playing bridge and attending the ballet and opera; "He was always a thoughtful person with a wonderful sense of humor," she stated to The New York Times.

With his 1943 success with Rosemary Taylor's work, Blassingame bought Ilikite (his fashioning of "I like it"), a country house near Peekskill, New York.

His wife Kathryn died in 1980; in that year he retired, relocating first from New York to Florida, and later to Mobile, Alabama where his sister resided. Blassingame, battling liver cancer, "died in his sleep at his home in Mobile" at the age of 84.
