= The Best of Frank Herbert =

1975 short story collection

- Author: Frank Herbert
- Language: English
- Genre: Science fiction
- Publisher: Sidgwick & Jackson
- Publication date: 1975
- Publication place: United States
- Media type: Print (hardback & paperback)
- Pages: 302
- ISBN: 0-283-98173-3
- Preceded by: The Book of Frank Herbert (1973)
- Followed by: The Priests of Psi (1980)

Short story collection.

The Best of Frank Herbert (1975) is a collection of thirteen short stories by American science fiction author Frank Herbert and edited by Angus Wells. In 1976 this book was re-released as a two volume set; The Best of Frank Herbert 1952–1964 and The Best of Frank Herbert 1965–1970. All of the stories in this collection had been previously published in magazine or book form.

== Contents ==
=== The Best of Frank Herbert 1952–1964 ===
- "Looking for Something?" - short story - Startling Stories, April 1952
- "Nightmare Blues" - novelette - Best SF Stories and Novels, 1955
- "Dragon in the Sea" (Excerpt) - short fiction - 1956
- "Cease Fire" - short story - Astounding Science Fiction, January 1958
- "Egg and Ashes" - short story - If, November 1960
- "The Mary Celeste Move" - short story - Analog, October 1964

=== The Best of Frank Herbert 1965–1970 ===
- "Committee of the Whole" - novelette - Galaxy Magazine, April 1965
- "Dune" (Excerpt) - short fiction - 1965
- "By the Book" - novelette - Analog, August 1966
- "The Primitives" - novelette - Galaxy Magazine, April 1966
- "The Heaven Makers" (Excerpt) - short fiction - 1967
- "The Being Machine" (also known as "The Mind Bomb") - novelette - If, October 1969
- "Seed Stock" - short story - Analog, April 1970
