= Destination: Void =

1965 novel by Frank Herbert

- Cover of first book edition (p/b)
- Author: Frank Herbert
- Original title: Do I Wake or Dream?
- Cover artist: Richard M. Powers
- Language: English
- Series: The Pandora Sequence
- Genre: Science fiction
- Published: August 1965 (magazine); June 1966 Berkley (book)
- Publication place: United States
- Media type: Print (hardback & paperback)
- ISBN: 0839825501; 978-0839825500
- Followed by: The Jesus Incident

Destination: Void is a science fiction novel by American author Frank Herbert, the first of four novels in the Pandora Sequence series. It first appeared in Galaxy Magazine—illustrated by John Giunta—in August 1965, under the title Do I Wake or Dream?, but was published in book form as Destination: Void the following year. A revised edition, edited and updated by the author, was released in 1978. The book stands alone but the story is continued—and embellished with more details of the Moonbase project and the history of the clones—in The Jesus Incident, The Lazarus Effect and The Ascension Factor co-authored by Bill Ransom.

== Plot summary ==
In the future, mankind has tried to develop artificial intelligence, succeeding only once, and then disastrously. A transmission from the project site on an island in the Puget Sound, "Rogue consciousness!", was followed by slaughter and destruction, culminating in the island vanishing from the face of the earth.

The current project is being run on the Moon, and the book tells the story of the seventh attempt in a series of experiments to create an artificial consciousness. For each attempt the scientists raise a group of clones. These clones are kept isolated and raised to believe that they will be the crew of a spaceship that will colonize a planet in the Tau Ceti solar system. (That Tau Ceti has no habitable planet is part of the planned frustration of the crew). The spaceship will take hundreds of years to reach the system and the crew will spend most of their time in hibernation. Along with the crew of six, the ship carries thousands of other clones in hibernation, intended to populate the new colony and, if necessary, provide replacements for any crew members who die along the way.

The crew are just caretakers: the ship is controlled by a disembodied human brain, called "Organic Mental Core" or "OMC", that runs the complex operations of the vessel and keeps it moving in space. But the first two OMCs (Myrtle and Little Joe) become catatonic, while the third OMC goes insane and kills three of the umbilicus crew members. The crew are left with only one choice: to build an artificial consciousness that will enable the ship to continue. The crew knows that if they attempt to turn back they will be ordered to abort (self destruct).

The clones have been bred and carefully selected for psychological purposes to reinforce each other, as well as to provide various specialized skills that will give them the best chance of success. The crew includes a chaplain-psychiatrist, Raja Flattery, who knows their real purpose, and that the breakdown of the OMCs was planned. He is aware that six other ships have gone out before theirs, each one of which failed. And he understands the nature of the test: create a high pressure environment in which brilliance may break through out of necessity, and create in the safety of the void what humans couldn't safely create on Earth. In this Space Ship Earthling number Seven ultimately succeeds, and the consequences of their success form the basis of the plot for the novels which follow.
