= Plasteel =

Plasteel may refer to:

- Plasteel, a composite of fiberglass and steel patented by automobile manufacturer Gurgel and first used in 1973
- Plasteel (Dune), a durable tough form of steel mentioned by Frank Herbert in his 1965 science fiction novel Dune and its sequels, and in his 1956 novel The Dragon in the Sea.
- Plasteel, a material commonly described in science fiction, often a composite of metal and plastic, a plastic with metallic properties, or a metal with plastic properties.
