= The Jesus Incident =

1979 novel by Frank Herbert

- First edition
- Authors: Frank Herbert; Bill Ransom
- Cover artist: Paul Alexander
- Language: English
- Genre: Science fiction
- Publisher: G. P. Putnam's Sons
- Publication date: May 1979
- Publication place: United States
- Media type: Print (hardback & paperback)
- ISBN: 0-399-12268-0
- OCLC: 4496975
- Dewey Decimal: 813/.5/4
- LC Class: PZ4.H5356 Je PS3558.E63
- Preceded by: Destination: Void
- Followed by: The Lazarus Effect

The Jesus Incident (1979) is the second science fiction novel set in the Destination: Void universe by the American author Frank Herbert and poet Bill Ransom. It is a sequel to Destination: Void (1965), and has two sequels: The Lazarus Effect (1983) and The Ascension Factor (1988).

== Plot introduction ==
The book takes place at an indeterminate time following the events in Destination: Void. At the end of Destination: Void the crew of the ship had succeeded in creating an artificial intelligence. The new conscious being, now known as 'Ship', gains a level of awareness that allows it to manipulate space and time. Ship instantly transports itself to a planet which it has decided the crew will colonize, christening it "Pandora". The first book ends with a demand from Ship for the crew to learn how to WorShip or how to establish a relationship with Ship, a godlike being.

The action of the book is divided between two settings, the internal spaces of Ship which is orbiting Pandora and the settlements on the planet. While the original crew of Ship, as described in Destination: Void, were cloned human beings from the planet Earth, by the time of The Jesus Incident, the crew has become a mixed bag of peoples from various cultures that have been accepted as crew members by Ship when it visited their planet as well as people who have been conceived and born on the ship. Evidently Ship has shown up at a number of planets as the suns of those planets were going nova, the implication being that these planets were other, failed experiments by Ship to establish a relationship with human beings. Ship refers to these as replays of human history, suggesting Ship itself has manipulated human history time and time again.

Ship's charge for humans to decide how to WorShip still remains unsatisfied. In the opening chapters, Ship reveals that Pandora will be a final test for the human race. Ship awakens the Chaplain/Psychiatrist Raja Flattery (part of the original Destination: Void crew) from hibernation, and reveals to him the true nature of this test. It tasks Flattery with intervening in the society which has developed on Pandora to solve this riddle of WorShip. Flattery is to help the humans to pass Ship's test or else risk the destruction of the race. Flattery assumes the name of Raja Thomas to mask his identity from the other shipmen.

Pandora is 80% sea which dominated by a type of kelp which appears to be sentient. The land is overrun by deadly efficient predators, forcing those living on the surface to adapt to a highly stressful lifestyle living within a fortress. The main fortress is known as Colony, a small city that is predominantly underground. When The Jesus Incident begins there have been three failed attempts at colonization of the surface. (The current colony is starting a second colonization site, known as The Redoubt.)

In addition to Raja Flattery, several main characters drive the narrative. Morgan Oakes is the head administrator of both the crew and the colonists and the central provocateur whose actions drive the conflict. Jesus Lewis is his main assistant as well as a biological engineer. Kerro Panille is a poet who has a special relationship with Ship. Legata Hamill is an administrative assistant and data analyst for Morgan Oakes. The planet Pandora itself with its non-human inhabitants is another main character of the book. As the book progresses, the reader discovers that the kelp, the hylighters, and other creatures of the planet appear to be linked into a large entity with a shared consciousness, Avata.

Jesus Lewis is the manager and chief scientist of Lab One which is a genetic engineering facility that is working on genetically modified clones of human beings in order to develop a class of engineered human beings who can survive the predators of Pandora. The clones are viewed as organic tools much like they were presented in Destination: Void where clones are sent out in specially prepared space ships to create an artificial consciousness. There is a clear social distinction between clones and naturally born human beings, a distinction that in the end leads to the outbreak of a series of battles and confrontations (slave rebellions) between natural humans and clones as conflict over food supplies and assignment of risk escalates.

The other major project of Lab One is to create a tool that will eliminate the kelp living in the seas of Pandora. The kelp is viewed by the leadership of the Oakes administration as the major impediment to the exploitation of the seas as a source of food.

== Major themes ==
The book deals with concepts such as artificial intelligence, worship, resource allocation, and religious violence. Clones and genetic engineering take up themes of racism. One of the major themes is leadership and how the values of leaders influence a society through the actions and narratives of a society's leaders. Another is the nature and definition of God. There are echoes of Herbert's exploration of the effect of greed on the leaders within a society and how greedy leaders will warp a society in order to consolidate their own power, a theme in the Dune books as well as The Dosadi Experiment (1977).

The book makes several references to Frankenstein, as an analogy to the relationship between Ship and humans. The book takes it a step further demanding that humans take responsibility for their creation by realizing Ship is a human artifact and its omnipotence ultimately sprang from human hands. This is what Ship meant when it demanded worShip.

== History ==
The novelette "Songs of a Sentient Flute" (1979) from the Medea series was the precursor version of The Jesus Incident, but the two were set on different planets due to copyright issues, being published by different publishers.
