= Jim Simmerman =

American poet and editor (1952–2006)

- Born: March 5, 1952; Boulder, Colorado, U.S.
- Died: June 29, 2006 (aged 54); Flagstaff, Arizona, U.S.
- Education: University of Missouri; Iowa Writers' Workshop (MFA)
- Occupations: Poet; editor
- Parent(s): Wade Simmerman; Jane Simmerman

Jim Simmerman (March 5, 1952 – June 29, 2006) was an American poet and editor.

== Biography ==
Simmerman was born in Boulder, Colorado, in 1952. He received his MFA in Poetry from University of Iowa in 1980. He was Regents Professor of English at Northern Arizona University in Flagstaff, Arizona, where he led poetry writing workshops and served as an advisor to the literary journal Thin Air. He took his own life on June 29, 2006, in Flagstaff, Arizona after a long illness.

His poems have appeared widely in journals (Antæus, Georgia Review, North American Review, Ploughshares, Poetry), anthologies (The Bread Loaf Anthology of Contemporary American Poetry, The POETRY Anthology 1912-2002, Pushcart Prize X: Best of the Small Presses), and textbooks (Literature: Reading, Reacting, Writing; Thirteen Ways of Looking for a Poem: A Guide to Writing Poetry; Western Wind: An Introduction to Poetry); and his poetry writing exercise "Twenty Little Poetry Projects" generated the anthology Mischief, Caprice, & Other Poetic Strategies (Red Hen Press, 2004), edited by Terry Wolverton.

He is also co-editor, with Joseph Duemer, of Dog Music: Poetry about Dogs (St. Martin's Press, 1996).

== Awards ==
Jim Simmerman was the recipient of fellowships from the Arizona Commission on the Arts, the Bread Loaf Writers' Conference, the Port Townsend Writers' Conference, the Fine Arts Work Center, the Hawthornden Castle International Retreat for Writers, and the NEA.

== Works ==
- Home (Dragon Gate, Inc., 1983), chosen by Raymond Carver as a Pushcart Prize "Writer's Choice" Selection
- Once Out of Nature (The Galileo Press, Ltd., 1989), a "Best of the Small Presses" feature at the Frankfurt Book Fair
- Moon Go Away, I Don't Love You No More (Miami U. Press, 1994)
- Kingdom Come (Miami U. Press, 1999)
- American Children (BOA Editions, 2005).
