= The Priests of Psi =

1980 story collection by Frank Herbert

- Author: Frank Herbert
- Language: English
- Genre: Science fiction
- Publisher: Gollancz
- Publication date: 1980
- Publication place: United States
- Media type: Print (hardback & paperback)
- Pages: 192 pp
- ISBN: 0-575-02778-9
- Preceded by: The Best of Frank Herbert (1975)
- Followed by: Eye (1985)

The Priests of Psi (1980) is a collection of five short stories written by science fiction author Frank Herbert. All of the works had been previously published in magazine or book form.

== Contents ==
- "Old Rambling House" - short story - Galaxy Science Fiction 1958
- "Murder Will In" - novelette - Five Fates, Doubleday 1970
- "The Priests of Psi" - novella - Fantastic Science Fiction Stories 1960
- "Try to Remember!" - novelette - Amazing Stories 1961
- "Mindfield!" - novelette - Amazing Stories 1962
