= Port Townsend Writers' Conference =

The Port Townsend Writers' Conference was founded in 1974 by novelist Bill Ransom. It is held every summer at Fort Worden State Park, within the city limits of Port Townsend, on the inner tip of the Olympic Peninsula in Washington state. The conference is presented by Centrum, the multidisciplinary arts organization that also presents Jazz Port Townsend, the Festival of American Fiddle Tunes, and other week-long and weekend workshops and festivals.

The Conference features morning workshops in literary fiction, non-fiction, and poetry, and afternoon workshops in a wide variety of literary topics. Annual attendance averages 200 writers. Numerous readings, craft lectures, special events, and guided freewrites are a part of the Conference. in addition to founder Ransom, other program directors have included Jim Heynen, Carol Jane Bangs, Sam Hamill, Carla Vander Ven, and Jordan Hartt.

Noted authors who have been associated with the Port Townsend Writers' Conference over the years include Margaret Atwood, Raymond Carver, Alice Walker, Leslie Marmon Silko, Ken Kesey, Carolyn Forché, Belle Randall, Barry Lopez, Tom Robbins, Sam Hamill, Marvin Bell, Sherman Alexie, David Guterson, Terry Tempest Williams and Frank Herbert.
