= Centrum (arts organization) =

Washington state performing arts organization

Coordinates: 48°8′6″N 122°45′56″W

Centrum, located in Fort Worden State Park near Port Townsend, Washington, in Jefferson County is a multidisciplinary nonprofit arts organization that presents workshops and performances in a wide variety of artistic disciplines.

== Origin ==
Centrum was founded in 1973 as a partnership between the Washington State Arts Commission, the Office of the Superintendent of Public Instruction, and the Washington State Parks and Recreation Commission. The first executive director was Joseph F. Wheeler. Early program directors included Bill Ransom and Sam Hamill.

== Activities ==
While most programming is intergenerational, Centrum also provides a series of residential learning experiences that serve youth only. About one-third of Centrum workshop participants are 18 years old or younger. Centrum presents such programs as the Festival of American Fiddle Tunes, Jazz Port Townsend, the Port Townsend Acoustic Blues Festival, and the Port Townsend Writers' Conference.
