= The Lazarus Effect (novel) =

1983 novel by Frank Herbert and Bill Ransom

- Authors: Frank Herbert and Bill Ransom
- Cover artist: Abe Echevarria
- Language: English
- Genre: Science fiction
- Publisher: Putnam
- Publication date: 1983
- Publication place: United States
- Media type: Print (hardback & paperback)
- ISBN: 0-399-12815-8
- OCLC: 9044853
- Dewey Decimal: 813/.54 19
- LC Class: PS3558.E63 L3 1983
- Preceded by: The Jesus Incident
- Followed by: The Ascension Factor

The Lazarus Effect (1983) is the third science fiction novel set in the Destination: Void universe by the American author Frank Herbert and poet Bill Ransom. It takes place some time after the events in The Jesus Incident (1979).

== Plot summary ==
Set several centuries after The Jesus Incident, the ocean world Pandora has undergone drastic change. The once-dominant sentient kelp has nearly vanished, causing unstable ocean currents and submerging most of the remaining land masses. Humanity has split into two distinct cultures: Islanders and Mermen.

Islanders live on massive, bioengineered floating islands, each supporting populations of at least 10,000. Their technology is largely organic, but their society suffers from genetic instability caused by the cloning and experimentation of Jesus Lewis. Physical variations are common and broadly accepted, but infants with dangerous mutations are executed shortly after birth.

Mermen, by contrast, are genetically stable and physiologically closer to baseline humans, aside from webbed hands and feet. They inhabit advanced underwater cities, enjoying superior technology, medicine, and overall quality of life. Their long-term goals include restoring the intelligent kelp and redeveloping spaceflight to reach the orbiting Ship, the sentient vessel created in Destination: Void that originally brought humans to Pandora and still contains hibernation tanks filled with life from Earth.

Amid increasingly chaotic seas, a young Islander named Brett is swept overboard during a rogue wave and presumed lost. He is rescued by Scudi Wang, a Merman woman of similar age, and brought to her underwater home. Scudi is the heiress to a powerful Merman corporation controlling key resources such as food production and transport, making her a target for GeLaar Gallow, a revolutionary leader seeking to seize control of critical infrastructure.

Gallow leads a militant group known as the Green Dashers, named for their green camouflage suits and the native local predator species colloquially referred to as the Hooded Dasher. His plan centers on capturing the descending hibernation tanks from Ship, which contain both ancient humans and Earth life. A key element of his strategy involves Vata, a human-kelp hybrid created in the previous novel, who has remained dormant since the kelp’s collapse. To force Vata’s release from Islander control, Gallow destroys a floating city and kidnaps Ward Keel, the Islander Chief Justice responsible for deciding the fate of genetically unstable infants.

As Brett and Scudi attempt to escape, they are pursued by Gallow’s forces. They are aided by Queets Twisp, Brett’s employer, and Bushka, an Islander traumatized after being coerced into piloting the attack that destroyed the island. At the same time, the kelp begins to reawaken. Enormous hydrogen-filled creatures known as hylighters reappear, acting as carriers for kelp spores not seen for generations.

The resurgent kelp, now identifying itself as Avata, intervenes decisively. Gallow’s forces are ultimately destroyed, some overwhelmed as the kelp infiltrates their vessels and drags them underwater.

Avata establishes communication with Brett, Scudi, and others, revealing a broader restoration underway. The falling hibernation tanks release a variety of Earth species, including whales, while hylighters transport revived humans from centuries-long stasis to newly stabilized regions of land. With the kelp once again regulating ocean currents, these areas become viable for habitation.

In the aftermath, it is revealed that Vata has merged with the kelp, existing within its collective awareness. Ward Keel, who dies during the conflict, is also absorbed into this shared consciousness, reflecting a central reality of Pandora: those returned to the kelp after death become part of its distributed mind.

== Major themes ==
The book deals with concepts such as artificial intelligence, worship, ecology, and the inherent problems of totalitarianism. It also addresses the issues of clones, genetic engineering and racism.

== Reception ==
Dave Langford reviewed The Lazarus Effect for White Dwarf #50, and stated that "Not top-class Herbert - dunno about Ransom - but far better than its predecessor."

== Reviews ==
- Review by William Coyle (1983) in Fantasy Newsletter, #62 September 1983
- Review by Stuart Napier (1983) in Science Fiction Review, November 1983
- Review by Ken Lake (1984) in Vector 118
- Review by Tom Easton (1984) in Analog Science Fiction/Science Fact, February 1984
- Review by Frank Catalano (1984) in Amazing Science Fiction, March 1984
- Review by Peter Brigg (1984) in Foundation, #30 March 1984
- Review [French] by Élisabeth Vonarburg? (1984) in Solaris, #56
- Review [French] by Michel Cossement (1984) in SFère, #18
- Review [French] by Dominique Warfa (1984) in Fiction, #356
- Review [French] by Jean-Pierre Lion (2011) in Bifrost, #63
