= The Eyes of Heisenberg =

1966 science fiction novel by Frank Herbert

- Cover of first edition (paperback)
- Author: Frank Herbert
- Original title: Heisenberg's Eyes
- Language: English
- Genre: Science fiction
- Publisher: Berkley Books
- Publication date: 1966
- Publication place: United States
- Media type: Print (hardback & paperback)
- Pages: 158

The Eyes of Heisenberg is a 1966 science fiction novel by American writer Frank Herbert.

Originally serialized as Heisenberg's Eyes in Galaxy magazine between June and August 1966, it was issued as a book by Berkley later the same year. The title refers to Werner Heisenberg's uncertainty principle, which the plot examines as a source of randomness both on the molecular (specifically genetic) level and on a macroscopic (anthropological) level.

== Setting ==
The narrative takes places in a future in which the Earth is unified and society is rigidly stratified into two genetic and reproductive classes: the "Optimen" (a ruling class of genetically superior humans, who include women) and the "Folk." All humans are mandatorily genetically reviewed and modified ("cut") shortly after conception.

The Optimen, who are distinguished by genetic excellence and exercise absolute dictatorial control over Earth from an enclave in North America, hold global society in stasis, both politically and through continuous manipulation of the human genome. They are self-selected; their metabolism responds to the life-extension enzymes available to all members of society - which normally increase lifespan to around 400 years - by inducing true biological immortality. Only a small minority of the Folk is permitted to reproduce, and that only under strict supervision—the vast majority are "Sterries," kept sterile through an ever-present prophylactic gas. The Optimen are naturally sterile.

The Folk revere the Optimen with a quasi-religious fervor, centered on the mantra "They are the power that loves us and protects us." The adulation is however not universal; an anti-Optiman resistance exists, in the form of the "Parents Underground" and the "Couriers," both networks sponsored by the Cyborgs, mechanically-enhanced humans who had lost a war for control of Earth to the Optimen in the distant past. As the story unfolds, the setting — which had seemed a relatively near future, perhaps a few centuries at most — is revealed to be at least 80,000 years in the future (that being the age given for the oldest of the Optimen). The extraordinary social control of the Optimen - who have deliberately stunted technological progress - is such that culture is largely indistinguishable from that of the late 21st century. The Cyborgs themselves contribute to the stasis, being extremely long-lived themselves — the Optiman-Cyborg War is implied to have taken place in the extremally distant past, but also no more than three Cyborg generations ago.

Most of the book takes place in the "Seatac Megalopolis"—apparently incorporating present-day Seattle and Tacoma — and the Optiman enclave in the Great Lakes region.

== Major characters ==
- Harvey and Lizbeth Durant - protagonists, "viables" (parents), Courier dissidents
- Dr. Vyaslav Potter - a surgeon, performs the "cut" on Harvey and Lizbeth's embryo, refuses to destroy it
- Dr. Thei Svengaard - a lower-ranking surgeon. Shanghaied by the resistance after becoming suspicious
- Glisson - a high-ranking Cyborg
- The Tuyere - the ruling triumvirate of the Optimen, elected for a century. Comprises the Optimen Calapine, Nourse and Schruille
- Dr. Boumard and Dr. Igan - high-ranking surgeons in the service of the Optimen
- Max Allgood - the Tuyere's Chief of Tachy-Security. A succession of clones, replaced at 400-year intervals

== Plot ==
Harvey and Lizbeth Durant arrive to witness the "cutting" of their embryo. Svengaard, a low-ranking doctor, tries to convince them to not view the procedure, but they are adamant and insist on their right, all the while secretly communicating their contempt for Svengaard in a silent Courier code. Potter, a high-ranking surgeon, arrives to perform the cut. During the procedure, he is shocked to discover that the embryo has qualities not seen in millennia; superior genetics in the areas of intelligence, plus vocation for immortality and full fertility. Obligated to destroy it, Potter is surprised to find himself unwilling to do so, aided by the on-the-spot collusion of one of the nurses who sabotages the record of the operation.

Allgood, Boumard and Igan arrive at the Hall of Counsel for an audience with the Tuyere after Tachy-Security monitoring detects something suspicious during the Durant embryo "cutting." The nurse has been arrested, but has died under interrogation. The Optimen triumvirate of Calapine, Nourse and Schruille playfully mock their subordinates, but with a faint undercurrent of menace. Calapine flirts with Allgood in a semi-bemused fashion. The Tuyere order that Svengaard be brought before them. Boumard and Igan are revealed to the reader as Cyborg agents. Svengaard is interrogated by the Tuyere; badly frightened, he fumbles and grows agitated under their mockery, becoming borderline insubordinate. The Tuyere calm him down with a display of magnanimity, reminding him of their power, wisdom and seniority.

In a service area under the Seatac Megalopolis, the Durants have gone into hiding. They meet with the cyborg Glisson, who informs them of events, tells them that a strange external force had (beneficially) interfered with the cutting process of their embryo, and orders them to stay put. The Durants chafe under its unfeeling, domineering manner, hoping to one another to one day be free of the Optimen and Cyborgs. They scheme to deliver their baby the unheard-of natural way, and keep it out of reach of both factions. They wonder if the interfering power might be God.

Svengaard detects activity in the hospital vat room, where the embryo is kept. Investigating, he is rendered unconscious and abducted from under the nose of Allgood's surveillance. Potter is escorted through the streets of Seatac by a resistance agent. Near their destination, they are intercepted by security forces. Potter's escort sends him ahead, revealing itself as a combat cyborg and decimating the pursuers until it is destroyed. Potter is spirited away by the resistance. The Tuyere—and many other Optimen—watch the battle live, the long-unfamiliar thrill of violence awakening odd sensations in them.

In a resistance safehouse, Igan tries to recruit a recalcitrant Svengaard. Failing, he and Boumard sedate him and make plans to evacuate Seatac, which they suspect the Optimen are about to genocidally purge of all life. The Durants, Boumard and Igan (their cover blown) and a gagged Svengaard are moved out of Seatac in a hover-truck driven by a cyborg, later revealed to be Glisson. At a checkpoint, Svengaard cries out briefly, causing them to be traced. Glisson changes their destination.

The Tuyere wipe out the population of Seatac through a combination of poison gas and sonic weapons. They find themselves surprised by their unstable emotional reactions to the event. The occupants of the truck observe the destruction of Seatac; Svengaard's faith in the Optimen is badly shaken. The Durants notice that Boumard and Igan are in the early stages of cyborgization. The truck proceeds to a ramshackle safehouse in the forest.

The Tuyere receives a field report from Allgood. Calapine, growing suspicious of his behavior, scans him with her instruments, discovering that he has accepted Cyborg implants. Enraged, she kills him remotely. Calapine and Schruille decide to henceforth run Tachy-Security themselves, finding themselves oddly stimulated by the prospect of an even more active involvement in violence. Potter is revealed to have died offstage in Seatac. Calapine and Nourse both require treatment for enzyme imbalance. The occupants of the cabin decide that the apathetic Svengaard cannot be trusted, and should be killed. Harvey asks him if he wants to live; Svengaard suddenly finds that he does. He offers to care for the Durant's child, an offer Harvey accepts as he does not trust Boumard and Igan. The security forces of the Optimen surround the house and disarm (literally) Glisson.

The Tuyere debate what to do with the prisoners. They speculate that, if the infection of viability spreads, wiping out all the Folk and starting over would not be out of the question. They decide to have the prisoners brought before themselves for interrogation. A full assembly of Optimen meet in the Hall of Counsel. The prisoners are brought in, immobilized in a solid block of transparent plastic. The assembled Optimen begin to feel odd emotions, which spiral into greater and greater instability. Glisson asserts that reintroducing them to firsthand violence had been a Cyborg ploy to destabilize the delicate equilibrium of the Optiman mind, and that the Cyborgs have won. A semi-hysterical Calapine converses with the prisoners, verges on killing them, then abruptly releases them instead. The Optimen descend into insanity; several, including Schruille, are killed in a stampede. The former prisoners try to help.

Calapine and the former prisoners discuss the new status quo. Glisson's gloating is cut off when a biological solution is proposed: Svengaard believes that he will be able to stabilize the Optimen, and introduce the beneficial mutations of the Durant embryo on a wide scale, giving the Folk a lifespan of at least 12,000 to 15,000 years—longevity without the pernicious ossification of immortality. The novel concludes on a note of guarded optimism.

== Themes ==
Continuing a theme present in many of Herbert's other works, the novel is principally concerned with the problems inherent in or caused by the inflexibility of a static system. The Durants find themselves a cog in the high-level machinations of competing factions, none of which have their own best interests at heart.

A number of Herbert's other common themes pop up, including his interest in complex, rigidly codified or ritualized behaviors, reflected in the precise etiquette expected of those granted an audience with the Tuyere. Herbert's interest in exotic forms of communication takes the shape of the secret language of the Couriers, conveyed through subtle palm pressures during handholding. The longevity of the Optimen prefigures Leto II of the Dune saga.

== Reception ==
David Pringle rated The Eyes of Heisenberg two stars out of four. Pringle described the book as "a provocative novel of ideas written in this author's usual style".

== See also ==
- Battle Angel Alita
- Elysium (film)
