= Direct Descent =

1980 novel by Frank Herbert

- Author: Frank Herbert
- Language: English
- Genre: Science fiction
- Publisher: Ace Books
- Publication date: 1980
- Publication place: United States
- Media type: Print (Paperback)
- Pages: 186
- ISBN: 0-441-14897-2
- OCLC: 7051228
- Dewey Decimal: 813/.54 19
- LC Class: PS3558.E63 D5

Direct Descent is a 1980 science fiction novella by American writer Frank Herbert. It was based on his short story "Pack Rat Planet" published in 1954 in Astounding Science Fiction and was marketed as an illustrated story, with over 60 pages of illustrations to complement the narrative.

== Plot summary ==
Set in the far future, it consists of two stories about how the peaceful Archivists of the library planet Earth have to deal with warmongers arriving and trying to exploit knowledge for power.
