= Eye (short story collection) =

Book by Frank Herbert

- Cover of the first edition
- Author: Frank Herbert
- Illustrator: Jim Burns
- Language: English
- Genre: Science fiction
- Publisher: Berkley Books
- Publication date: November 1985
- Publication place: United States
- Media type: Print (paperback)
- Pages: 328
- ISBN: 0-425-08398-5
- Preceded by: The Priests of Psi (1980)
- Followed by: The Collected Stories of Frank Herbert (2014)

Eye (1985) is a collection of 13 science fiction short stories by American writer Frank Herbert. All of the works had been previously published in magazine or book form, except for "The Road to Dune".

== Contents ==
=== Introduction ===
Herbert discusses David Lynch's film Dune and his own participation in the production, and lists scenes that were shot, but cut from the released version.

=== Short fiction ===
- "Rat Race"
- "The Dragon in the Sea" - A psychological thriller originally serialized as Under Pressure in Astounding magazine from December 1955 through February 1956. It was revised and expanded into a novel in 1956. The version in this collection is the original short version, only 36 pages long.
- "Cease Fire"
- "A Matter of Traces" - A short story first appearing in Fantastic Universe magazine in 1958. It is notable for the introduction of the character Jorj X. McKie, saboteur extraordinaire, and is the first story set in the ConSentiency universe.
- "Try to Remember" - A linguist who tries to decipher the language of a race of frog-like extraterrestrials.
- "The Tactful Saboteur" - A novelette which appeared in Galaxy Science Fiction magazine in 1964. It was republished in The Worlds of Frank Herbert in 1971, and established the setting for Herbert's ConSentiency universe. It is a sequel to the above story "A Matter of Traces".
- "The Road to Dune" - Set in Herbert's Dune universe, this short "guidebook" takes the form of a guidebook for pilgrims to the planet Arrakis, following the fall of Padishah Emperor Shaddam IV. It was illustrated by Welsh artist Jim Burns. The "guidebook" discusses the major sights in the capital city, Arrakeen, including the Grand Palace and Temple of Alia. It also features images (with descriptions) of some of the devices and characters presented in the novels, including Paul's personal ornithopter, an Ixian heating device, Princess Irulan, Duncan Idaho, and Reverend Mother Mohiam.
- "By the Book"
- "Seed Stock"
- "Murder Will In"
- "Passage for Piano"
- "Death of a City"
- "Frogs and Scientists"

== Reception ==
Dave Langford reviewed Eye for White Dwarf #83, and stated that "It's a good anthology, free of the grotty potboilers which filled out earlier collections. I would have preferred another 'real' short story or two in place of the extract from The Dragon in the Sea (which deserves to be read in context): otherwise, OK."

=== Awards ===
Eye was nominated for a Locus Award for best short story collection in 1986, but lost to Stephen King's collection Skeleton Crew.
