= The Worlds of Frank Herbert =

1970 collection of short stories and articles by Frank Herbert

- Cover of 1st edition
- Author: Frank Herbert
- Cover artist: Jan Parker
- Language: English
- Series: Worlds of ... series
- Genre: Science fiction
- Publisher: New English Library, Ace Books
- Publication date: 1970
- Publication place: United States
- Media type: Print (paperback)
- Pages: 191
- OCLC: 11434828
- Preceded by: The Worlds of Robert A. Heinlein
- Followed by: The Worlds of Theodore Sturgeon

The Worlds of Frank Herbert is a collection of science fiction short stories written by American author Frank Herbert. It was first published in paperback by the British publisher New English Library in December 1970, and reprinted by the same publisher in May 1972, May 1972, and January 1988. The first American edition was published in paperback by Ace Books in 1971 as the second volume in its Worlds of ... series, and reprinted by the same publisher in 1972. Publication was later taken over by Berkley Books, which reissued the collection in paperback in September 1977, July 1981, and April, 1983. The first hardcover edition was published by Gregg Press in August 1980.

== Summary ==
The book collects eights short works of fiction by the author. A ninth story was added in the Ace Books edition, which also rearranged the order of the other stories. All of the stories in this collection had been previously published in magazines.

== Contents ==
- "The Tactful Saboteur" (novelette, Galaxy Magazine, October 1964) - appeared first in both editions
- "By the Book" (short story, Analog, August 1966) - absent from NEL edition, appeared second in Ace edition
- "Committee of the Whole" (short story, Galaxy Magazine, April 1965) - appeared second in NEL edition, third in Ace edition
- "Old Rambling House" (short story, Galaxy Magazine, April 1958) - appeared third in NEL edition, eighth in Ace edition
- "Mating Call" (short story, Galaxy Magazine, October 1961) - appeared fourth in NEL edition, fourth in Ace edition
- "A-W-F, Unlimited" (novelette, Galaxy Magazine, June 1961) - appeared fifth in NEL edition, ninth in Ace edition
- "The Featherbedders" (novelette, Analog, August 1967) - appeared sixth in NEL edition, seventh in Ace edition
- "The GM Effect" (short story, Analog, June 1965) - appeared seventh in NEL edition, sixth in Ace edtion
- "Escape Felicity" (short story, Analog, June 1966) - appeared eighth in NEL edition, fifth in Ace eidtion
