= The GM Effect =

- Short story by Frank Herbert
- Country: United States
- Language: English
- Genre: Science fiction

Publication
- Published in: Analog
- Publication type: Periodical
- Media type: Print (Magazine)
- Publication date: 1965

"The GM Effect" is a science fiction short story by American writer Frank Herbert, which first appeared in Analog magazine in 1965 and later in Herbert's 1985 short story collection The Worlds of Frank Herbert. It was Herbert's first story that dealt with a concept of other memory, a concept which would come to permeate most of his work, most notably the novels of the Dune universe.

== Plot summary ==
While "looking for a hormonal method of removing fat from the body" a group of doctors at a Yankton Technical Institute realize that the side effect of their compound 105 is a genetic memory (GM) effect, which allows the users to access memories of all of their biological ancestors. Realizing that such a discovery not only gives a complete and true insight in the history of the human race, but also grants the knowledge that the ancestors acquired, the doctors organize a meeting in which they plan to discuss how to proceed. They are, however, betrayed and killed by military forces, who then seize the formula to test it further for military use.

== Reception ==
Like many of Herbert's stories, the sprouts of ideas mentioned in "The GM Effect" would develop fully in his other works. Other Memory, a concept Herbert based on the idea of a genetic memory and Jung's collective unconscious, is in "The GM Effect" discovered by Dr. Valeric Sabantoce and accessed by both males and females by a simple use of a drug compound. In the Dune universe, the spice melange, as a drug, would come to dominate the future of mankind for both its ability to prolong life and to grant superhuman abilities. Also, the inability of males to access the other memory would turn out to be the leading cause for the creation of Kwisatz Haderach by the Bene Gesserit sisterhood in their attempt to create their equal, a male counterpart that would finally help them bring on the maturity of the human race. Hints of possession, as a possible side effect of the other memory, further developed in the concept of Abomination, is already mentioned in "The GM Effect", as is the "brutality of ancestors" necessary for the survival of the species and the downfall of individuals and groups that try to limit the information from others of their kind, which Herbert further explored in "Committee of the Whole" and the Dune universe.
