= Committee of the Whole (short story) =

- Short story by Frank Herbert
- Country: United States
- Language: English
- Genre: Science fiction

Publication
- Published in: Galaxy
- Publication type: Periodical
- Media type: Print (Magazine)
- Publication date: April 1965

"Committee of the Whole" is a short story by American science fiction author Frank Herbert; it first appeared in Galaxy magazine in April 1965, and later in Herbert's 1985 short story collection The Worlds of Frank Herbert. It deals with the concept of restraint as a paramount virtue necessary for survival of a human race in times when both information and the means for production of weapons of mass destruction are available to every individual.

== Plot summary ==
William R. Custer, a representative of farmers from Oregon, uses the public hearing for amendments to Taylor Grazing Act of 1934 to showcase a weapon with enough power to "cut the planet in half". The live broadcast of the hearing, during which Custer explains the details on how to build such a weapon, ensures that restraint becomes the key to survival of the human race, making threats and any form of slavery among humans obsolete, while also sending humanity in a new direction that may lead to its maturity. The idea of maturity of the human race would be fully developed by Herbert in the Dune universe, making it the main motivation behind the Bene Gesserit actions.
