= A Matter of Traces =

Short story by Frank Herbert

- Short story by Frank Herbert
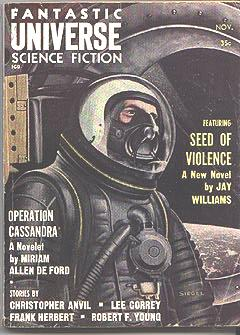
- Fantastic Universe, November 1958
- Country: United States
- Language: English

Publication
- Published in: Fantastic Universe
- Publication type: Periodical
- Media type: Print (Magazine)
- Publication date: 1958

Chronology
—	The Tactful Saboteur

"A Matter of Traces" is a science fiction short story by American writer Frank Herbert. It was first published in November 1958 in Fantastic Universe magazine, and reprinted in 1985 in Herbert's short story collection Eye. It is the first story in Herbert's ConSentiency universe, one of his three elaborate fictional universes spanning multiple volumes (the others being the Duniverse, and the Pandora Sequence developed with co-author Bill Ransom).

== Plot ==
This story takes place in the distant future on the planet Aspidiske VII. A meeting of the "Special Subcommittee on Intergalactic Culture" is called to investigate the possibility of excessive wastefulness on the part of the "Historical Preservation Teams of the Bureau of Cultural Affairs". Secretary Hablar comes to present a sample of the work being done by the Historical Preservation Team. The sample he submits is an interview with one of the few surviving pioneers of the planet Gomeisa III. He is an old man named Hilmot Gustin. During the course of the interview it is learned that Hilmot was the inventor of the rollitor, a plow harness for an alien life form native to the planet, and also the man who discovered what swamp cream does for the complexion. When the interview is finished the meeting is adjourned until the following day.

== Characters ==
- Senator Jorj C. Zolam – chairman of the subcommittee
- Senator Arden B Pingle – from Proxistu I
- Mergis Wl Ledder – counsel to the subcommittee
- Jorj X. McKie – saboteur extraordinary
- Glibbis Hablar – Secretary of Fusion
- Interviewer Simsu Yaggata
- Mr. Presby Kilkau
- Mrs. Kilkau – Gustin's niece
- Hilmot Gustin – pioneer

== Jorj X. McKie ==
Although there is not explicit reference to the Bureau of Sabotage in this story, Jorj X. McKie appears for the first time in his capacity as saboteur extraordinary. In an effort to keep the meeting from going on too long McKie sabotaged Secretary Hablar's projector and arranged to have the Assistant Secretary for Cultural Affairs sent to another meeting so that he would be unable to testify.

== Related works ==
"A Matter of Traces" was followed in 1964 by Herbert's short story "The Tactful Saboteur", in 1970 by his short novel Whipping Star and in 1977 by his full-length novel The Dosadi Experiment. While none of these works are exactly sequels they take place in the same imaginary universe and share the character, Jorj X. McKie.

== Sources ==
- Herbert, Frank. "A Matter of Traces" (short story) Fantastic Universe, 1958
- Herbert, Frank. "The Tactful Saboteur" (short story) Galaxy Science Fiction, 1964
- Herbert, Frank. Whipping Star (novel) G. P. Putnam's Sons, 1970
- Herbert, Frank. The Dosadi Experiment (novel) G. P. Putnam's Sons, 1977
