= Whipping Star =

1970 science fiction novel by Frank Herbert

- Cover of the first edition
- Author: Frank Herbert
- Language: English
- Genre: Science fiction
- Publisher: G. P. Putnam's Sons
- Publication date: 1970
- Publication place: United States
- Media type: Print (hardback & paperback)
- ISBN: 0-8398-2648-6
- Preceded by: “The Tactful Saboteur”
- Followed by: The Dosadi Experiment

Whipping Star is a 1970 science fiction novel by American writer Frank Herbert. It is the first full-length novel set in the ConSentiency universe established by Herbert in his short stories “A Matter of Traces” and “The Tactful Saboteur”.

== Plot ==
In the far future, humankind has made contact with numerous other sapient species: Gowachin, Laclac, Wreaves, Pan Spechi, Taprisiots, and Caleban (among others) and has helped to form the ConSentiency to govern among the species. After suffering under a tyrannous pure democracy which had the power to create laws so fast that no thought could be given to the effects, the sentients of the galaxy found the need for a Bureau of Sabotage (BuSab) to slow the wheels of government, thereby preventing it from legislating recklessly.

In Whipping Star, Jorj X. McKie is a saboteur extraordinary, a born troublemaker who has naturally become one of BuSab's best agents. As the novel opens, it is revealed that Calebans, who are beings visible to other sentient species as stars, have been disappearing one by one. Each disappearance is accompanied by millions of sentient deaths and instances of incurable insanity.

Ninety years prior to the setting of Whipping Star, the Calebans appeared and offered jumpdoors to the collective species, allowing sentients to travel instantly to any point in the universe. Gratefully accepting, the sentiency didn't question any potential flaws in this infrastructure. Now Mliss Abnethe, a female human psychotic of immense power and wealth, has bound a Caleban (called Fannie Mae) in a contract that allows the Caleban to be whipped to death; when the Caleban dies, everyone who has ever used a jumpdoor (which is almost every adult in the sentient world and many of the young) will die as well.

The Calebans face an even more existential threat, and begin to disappear one at a time, leaving our plane of existence (or exiting "our wave") to save themselves. (As all Calebans are connected, if all were to remain in our plane of existence, when Fannie Mae dies all Calebans would die.) Upon each Caleban's exit, millions of the ConSentiency are killed or rendered insane. McKie has to find Mliss and stop her before Fannie Mae reaches, in her words, "ultimate discontinuity", but he is constrained by the law protecting private individuals by restricting the ministrations of BuSab to public entities.

McKie succeeds in saving Fannie Mae by opening a jumpdoor into space which shunts a large interstellar cloud of (presumably) hydrogen into her stellar body, rejuvenating her from her torture at the hands of the criminal Palenki henchmen hired by Mliss Abnethe. Fannie Mae had agreed to the contract with Abnethe in return for education. Calebans have great difficulty understanding and communicating with the more limited species of the ConSentiency (and vice versa), but Fannie Mae is insatiably curious. Abnethe's wealth provides the best tutors in exchange for Fannie Mae's agreement to take the whippings. Abnethe has an insane sadistic streak, but a court-mandated Clockwork Orange–style conditioning session leaves her unable to tolerate the suffering of others. Abnethe needs a Caleban to take the whippings because she nevertheless still craves a way to satisfy her sadistic urges – and Calebans do not broadcast their pain easily recognized by other species.

== Related works ==
Whipping Star was preceded by the short story "The Tactful Saboteur". It was followed in 1977 by Herbert's The Dosadi Experiment. These stories take place in the same imaginary universe and have the same main character, Jorj X. McKie, as in Whipping Star.

== Features related to other Herbert works ==
The chairdogs that appear in multiple Dune novels—both the original series by Frank Herbert, as well as the extended series by Brian Herbert and Kevin J. Anderson—are also a feature of the later Whipping Star novel.

== Main characters ==
- Jorj X. McKie - BuSab Saboteur Extraordinary - Human
- Bildoon - BuSab Director - Pan Spechi
- Fannie Mae - Caleban
- Mliss Abnethe - wealthy female - human
