= The Ascension Factor =

1988 novel by Frank Herbert and Bill Ransom

- Authors: Frank Herbert and Bill Ransom
- Cover artist: Ron Miller
- Language: English
- Genre: Science fiction
- Publisher: Putnam
- Publication date: 1988
- Publication place: United States
- Media type: Print (Hardcover & paperback)
- ISBN: 0-399-13224-4
- OCLC: 16313372
- Dewey Decimal: 813/.54 19
- LC Class: PS3558.E63 A9 1988
- Preceded by: The Lazarus Effect

The Ascension Factor (1988) is the fourth and final science fiction novel set in the Destination: Void universe by the American author Frank Herbert and poet Bill Ransom. It takes place about twenty five years after The Lazarus Effect. It completes the story of the humans descended from those left by the voidship Earthling on the planet Pandora approximately 480 years earlier.

== Plot summary ==
Twenty-five years after the hibernation tanks were retrieved from orbit releasing multiple Earth organisms into Pandora's ecosystem, the sixth Raja Flattery clone, who went into hibernation when the voidship Earthling (from the earlier novel Destination: Void) was launched. Banking on the respect Pandorans bore for his training as a Chaplain/Psychiatrist he has established himself as a totalitarian dictator styling himself "the Director". He maintains some semblance of order through violent suppression of opposition and government control of food production and distribution, often withholding rations to suppress attempted popular revolts. He also controls mass media including fake news reports blaming rebel activity for mass murder of civilians and food destruction when murders are perpetrated by his own security forces and the food is not destroyed as it is safely in underground government storage silos. Towards the end of the book, the protagonists speculate that there is no organised resistance, merely individual people engaging in one off acts of disobedience, that serve to disrupt Flattery's control.

Current Control, which uses electrical stimulation to make navigable pathways through the sea kelp as well as literally controlling worldwide oceanic currents to prevent rogue waves that would otherwise result from Pandora's binary stars destroying land settlements, is located in an orbital space station. It is headed by Dwarf MacIntosh, one of the few humans from the hyb tanks to survive long after they opened and along with Flattery the only one still alive. MacIntosh chose his position to get away from Flattery.

Flattery has instigated a research and manufacture programme to result in the launch of a voidship so he can escape Pandora. To this end he ordered the assassination of Alyssa Marsh, a kelp researcher and one of the last three humans who survived the hyb tank opening and Flattery's former lover who rejected him. Flattery personally stripped Marsh's flesh and removed her brain for use as an Organic Mental Core (OMC). While the original voidship program used OMCs that the designers knew would go insane forcing the crew to develop an artificial intelligence in order to survive (this led to the creation of Ship in the earlier books), Flattery does not want to risk another AI and believes that by giving the OMC sensory inputs and the ability to speak it will not go mad. Unbeknownst to Flattery and the child, Marsh was impregnated by him and gave birth to a child, Yuri Brood. Brood is a captain in the security forces. As part of his propaganda, Flattery orders a holovision news reporter, Beatriz Tatoosh, to accompany the OMC as it sent into orbit. To ensure compliance, Flattery orders the murder of Beatriz's crew who are replaced by a security team led by Brood.

Ben Ozette, another journalist, has been allowed to do a series of articles on Crista Galli. Crista arrived mysteriously from out of the kelp as an approximately 20-year-old woman. Flattery fears the kelp, which one of his predecessors nearly eradicated from Pandora, and thus Crista who has been affected by kelp in unknown ways. He keeps her heavily sedated and has her injected with a series of "medicines" that are actually a chemical that will develop into a fatal neurotoxin killing anyone who touches her if the injections stop. This is both propaganda against the kelp which he claims is dangerous and a mechanism designed to have her returned to his care if she escapes or is abducted. Ben uses his access to free Crista.

While fleeing in a hydrofoil, the boat's door is opened and the scent of Crista reaches a giant stand of blue kelp. Unlike other kelp that has been returning to sentience and creating colour light displays which is then bombed by the humans on Flattery's standing order to prevent it becoming intelligent, this stand of wild kelp has refrained from giving indication of its awakening, instead growing to huge size on the periphery of controlled kelp. This kelp likens its awareness to a brain damaged human, knowing that it should have greater capacity than it does but having holes it its awareness. On detecting the familiar scent, the kelp configures itself to force the hydrofoil into itself, the oceans being so densely filled with kelp that pathways (created by Current Control) are the only way to navigate. On the way, Ben's holograph technician is lost overboard presumed killed by the kelp. Withdrawn from her fake medicine, Ben is nearly killed by contacting Crista's poison exuding body. Contact with Crista's bare skin also gives Ben an altered state of shared consciousness wherein he gains access to information known to the kelp and to Crista and to all creatures the kelp has contacted.

On board the Orbiter, McIntosh notices the overt actions of the kelp and states that the wild kelp is large enough that it could overwhelm Current Control if it wished. He, Beatriz, and the Orbiter's crew combat Flattery's security forces even to the point where the security forces threaten to destroy the Marsh OMC.

Flattery's master assassin, Spider Nevi, and his chief of Security, Zentz, manage to track Ben and Crista when they make landfall in a region outside Flattery's control. This region is home to Zavatans, members of a pacifistic religion, including Queets Twisp (a fisherman from the previous book) who have organised a vast food production network as well as a vast number of refugees. Their food is produced undercover or underground, using the same biotechnology the Islanders used to feed their living island ships. They deliberately expose small and meagre crops to deceive Flattery's aerial reconnaissance. About to be killed, Crista and Ben are instead hidden from the sight of Flattery's agents by some sort of hologram that vastly exceeds human technology levels. Crista and Ben learn that the technician Rico is alive and that the kelp has in a very short amount of learned from him about holography and extended it. The kelp is even able to add some sort of physical component that resists lasers and is able to add tactile element. The presence of kelp fibres in the computer systems of the Orbiter allows the kelp to extend this effect into the Orbiter so that people on Pandora and the Orbiter can touch.

Despite widespread uprisings seeking revenge on Flattery, the kelp declares that Flattery is not to be killed. Instead he is encapsulated by the kelp and kept alive to be a prisoner of his own selfishness. Through the same shared consciousness this is witnessed by the world's whole human population.

Through the shared Avata consciousness Tweegs learns that Ben and Crista are destined to improve life on Pandora. Brood is to earn redemption by, having learned of his parentage through the altered consciousness, tending to his mother as the OMC onboard the Voidship Nietzsche as she dictates to him a manual of proper human behaviour. MacIntosh and Beatriz are to take themselves, other humans and the symbiotic shared consciousness Avata to a new planet far away from Pandora whose days are numbered.
