= Bill Ransom =

American novelist

- Born: 1945 (age 80–81); Puyallup, Washington
- Education: BA, Sociology and English Education; MA, English
- Alma mater: University of Washington; Utah State University
- Occupations: Science fiction author The Evergreen State College dean
- Writing career
- Notable awards: Nominated for Pulitzer Prize and National Book Award
- Website: billransom.org

Bill Ransom (born 1945 in Puyallup, Washington) is an American science fiction writer.

== Early life and education ==
He began full-time employment at the age of eleven as an agricultural worker. He attended Washington State University on track and boxing scholarships, and the University of Puget Sound on a track scholarship. He received his BA in Sociology and English Education from the University of Washington in 1970, and MA in English from Utah State University in 1997.

== Work ==
From 1965 to 1970 Ransom worked as an expeditor on a quick engine change team, building and repairing military and commercial jet engines. He studied American minority literature and Old and Middle English on an NDEA Title IV fellowship at the University of Nevada, Reno, then began a pilot project with the Poetry in the Schools program in Washington state. He received his MA in English from Utah State University. He founded and directed the popular Port Townsend Writers Conference for Centrum and appeared in two feature films: An Officer and a Gentleman and The Caine Mutiny Court-Martial (CBS).

He was a firefighter, firefighting basic training instructor, and CPR instructor for six years; and an advanced life support emergency medical technician for ten years in Jefferson County, Washington. He volunteers with humanitarian groups in Central America.

== Writing ==
Bill Ransom co-authored three Ace Science Fiction novels with Frank Herbert, following up on Herbert's Destination: Void. The Pandora series included: The Jesus Incident (1979), The Lazarus Effect (1983) and The Ascension Factor (1988) from the Putnam/Berkley Publishing Group. In addition the novelette "Songs of a Sentient Flute" (1979) from the Medea series was the precursor version of The Jesus Incident, but the two were set on different planets due to copyright issues, being published by different publishers.

Ransom has published six novels, six poetry collections, numerous short stories and articles. Learning the Ropes (Utah State University Press), a collection of poetry, short fiction and essays, was billed as "a creative autobiography." Three of his short stories from this collection have been selections of the PEN/NEA Syndicated Fiction Project, often called "The Pulitzer Prize of the Short Story": "Uncle Hungry," "What Elena Said" and "Learning the Ropes." These appeared in the Sunday magazine editions of major newspapers around the country.

His 1973 poetry collection Finding True North & Critter was nominated for both the Pulitzer Prize and the National Book Award.

His most recent novel is Burn (Ace, 1995), a sequel to ViraVax (Ace, 1993). Recent poetry is in Puerto del Sol, Spillway and Petroglyph. Jaguar, a 1990 Ace paperback, came out on the internet via Alexandria Digital Literature in 1999, and was the first novel to outstrip short stories for the bestseller slot. Jaguar remained on the bestseller list from January through June, 2000; Wildside Press re-released it as a physical book in 2001. With Richard Landerman, he wrote screenplays of his novels Jaguar, ViraVax and Burn.

== Personal life ==
Bill Ransom is single with an adult daughter and three grandchildren. He resides in Grayland, Washington. As of 2010 he was listed as Dean of Curriculum at The Evergreen State College in Olympia, Washington.
