= The Heaven Makers =

Science fiction novel by Frank Herbert

- Cover of first edition (paperback)
- Author: Frank Herbert
- Cover artist: John Schoenherr
- Language: English
- Genre: Science fiction
- Publisher: Avon
- Publication date: 1967 (1968 as book)
- Publication place: United States
- Media type: Print (Hardback & Paperback)
- Pages: 159

The Heaven Makers (1968) is a science fiction novel by American writer Frank Herbert. It was originally serialized in Amazing Stories magazine in 1967.

== Plot introduction ==
The Heaven Makers is set on contemporary Earth with one difference: that we are being watched and manipulated by aliens for their viewing pleasure. The plot focuses on several humans whose lives are changed by the aliens, and an alien observer investigating the morality of these changes.

== Reception ==
David Pringle rated The Heaven Makers one star out of four. Pringle added "the sex in the book is all male wish-fulfillment; the politics and science are childish".
