= The Tactful Saboteur =

- Short story by Frank Herbert
- Galaxy Science Fiction, October 1964
- Country: United States
- Language: English

Publication
- Published in: Galaxy Science Fiction
- Publication type: Periodical
- Media type: Print (Magazine)
- Publication date: October 1964

Chronology
- Series: ConSentiency
A Matter of Traces	Whipping Star

"The Tactful Saboteur" is a science fiction novelette by American writer Frank Herbert, which first appeared in Galaxy Science Fiction magazine in October 1964. It is the second story in Herbert's ConSentiency universe, the first being "A Matter of Traces".

Its three chapters are written in a brisk, economical style, and it proved to be one of Herbert's most accessible and popular works. It was subsequently republished in The Worlds of Frank Herbert in 1971, and again in Herbert's 1985 short story collection Eye after the film adaptation of his magnum opus, Dune.

== Plot ==
The protagonist of "The Tactful Saboteur" is saboteur extraordinary Jorj X. McKie, an employee of the Bureau of Sabotage (BuSab). BuSab is a government agency responsible for conducting dirty tricks "in lieu of red tape" to help slow down and regulate the vast galaxy-spanning bureaucracy of the ConSentiency. (In keeping with its ethos the Secretary of the agency retains their office until they themselves are sabotaged or resign). Tasked with finding missing saboteur Napoleon Bildoon, McKie attempts to penetrate the secrets of the Pan-Spechi, a race divided into groups of five crèche mates, only one of whom possess ego-awareness at a time. In so doing he runs afoul of the "Tax Watchers" organization, which is adamantly opposed to the very existence of BuSab.

== Sources ==
- Herbert, Frank. "A Matter of Traces" (short story) Fantastic Universe, 1958
- Herbert, Frank. "The Tactful Saboteur" (short story) Galaxy Science Fiction, 1964
- Herbert, Frank. Whipping Star (novel) G. P. Putnam's Sons, 1970
- Herbert, Frank. The Dosadi Experiment (novel) G. P. Putnam's Sons, 1977
