= Cease Fire (short story) =

"Cease Fire" is a science fiction short story by Frank Herbert. It was first published in Astounding Science Fiction in 1958, and was included in the anthology of notable stories, A Century of Science Fiction (1962), edited by Damon Knight. It has also been published as part of later collections of Herbert's best stories, such as Eye.

== Plot ==
The story is set in 1972, during a low-level war against an unnamed enemy (presumably the USSR) being waged somewhere in the arctic region of North America. Both sides have "life detection" technology, that can detect living creatures at a distance, and electromagnetic shields of varying effectiveness that can conceal people from the detectors.

Hulser is a scientist conscripted into the army. His wife is expecting their first child. He is manning a forward observation post using detectors and his own shield to spot enemy activity. His detector registers small life forms that may or may not be foxes or wolves. Hulser wonders if the enemy has a shield that merely reduces the apparent size of the person wearing it in the detector. Thinking about his own shield, and need to protect him against chemical reactions it would induce in his body, he realizes that the technology can be used to remotely detonate explosives, giving his side an overwhelming advantage and ending the war. Deciding that the detector is registering enemy soldiers, he calls in a mortar strike and then is embroiled in a full-scale fire fight. Panicking, he spends the rest of his time demanding to be pulled out.

The story describes Hulser's efforts to get out of combat and have his idea taken seriously. Convinced of his cause, he stands up to his sergeant and insults his commanding officer, earning him a cell in the brig. There, he is contacted by a higher-ranking officer and prominent scientist who starts to believe his idea.

Eventually there is a successful demonstration attended by top military officers, and a mysterious civilian to whom they defer. Although the war will be won, they are strangely pessimistic. In the final scene they explain that although war with explosives is no longer possible, war will continue with even worse weapons, such as chemical poisons and disease agents. They give Hulser a copy of a book, saying that he and his children will need it. It is a copy of the unexpurgated works of "the master of treachery and deceit", Niccolò Machiavelli.
