= Frogs and Scientists =

- Short story by Frank Herbert
- Destinies cover (1979)
- Country: United States
- Language: English

Publication
- Published in: Destinies
- Publisher: Ace Books
- Media type: Print (Paperback)
- Publication date: 1979

"Frogs and Scientists" is a short short story by science fiction author Frank Herbert. It appeared in the August–September 1979 edition of the anthology Destinies: The Paperback Magazine of Science Fiction and Speculative Fact edited by Jim Baen, and later in Herbert's 1985 short story collection Eye.

== Plot ==
Two frogs are counting minnows in a hydroponics pond when a human female comes to take a bath. The two frogs begin discussing the woman, and the frog Lapat tries to explain what is going on to the other frog, Lavu. Lapat tells Lavu about the use of clothing, his theory about the purpose of breasts, and the belief that the woman is there trying to attract a mate. When Lavu asks Lapat why he knows so much about humans, Lapat says "I pattern my life after the most admirable of all humans, the scientist." After Lapat explains what a scientist is, the frogs go back to counting minnows.

== Interior artwork ==
When this short story was originally published in Destinies it was accompanied by two drawings by Alicia Austin. The drawings were not reprinted in Eye.
