= Old Rambling House =

- Short story by Frank Herbert
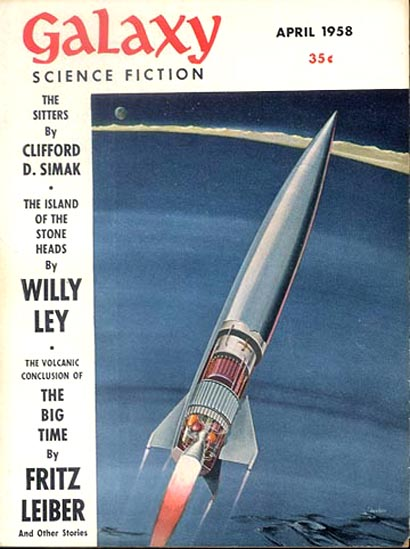
- Country: United States
- Language: English
- Genre: Science fiction

Publication
- Published in: Galaxy
- Publication type: Periodical
- Media type: Print (Magazine)
- Publication date: 1958

"Old Rambling House" is a short story by American science fiction author Frank Herbert which first appeared in Galaxy magazine in 1958 and later in Herbert's 1985 short story collection The Worlds of Frank Herbert. It features a dystopian multiverse in which no hope of freedom is left, which is atypical for Herbert's works.

== Plot ==
Having decided to leave their old life behind and to settle down to raise their child, Ted and Martha Graham put their trailer house on sale. Over a phone call they are offered a house in exchange for their trailer, and are shortly after lead to the tour of the house by its owners Clint and Raimee Rush. Although suspicious of the deal, as the house is worth several times more and of the Rushes themselves who claim to be foreigners (Basque), they still decide to go forward with the deal.

As soon as they said yes, the Rushes disappeared and a strange man entered their new home informing them that they are now under the Rojac sovereignty.

Rushes, aliens from another planet, have cleverly realized that the only way to be free from Rojac is to find willing substitutes for their position in the sovereignty, a position of taxcollectors in a house that travels around galaxies. However, because of Martha's pregnancy, they realize that the child did not agree to the exchange. They are compelled to contact the Rojac, realizing that this will bring Earth, a world yet unknown to them, under Rojac's domain.

== Publication history ==
- Galaxy magazine, Volume 15 No. 6, April 1958.
- Herbert, Frank. The Worlds of Frank Herbert, London: New English Library, 1970.
- Herbert, Frank. The Priests of Psi and Other Stories, London, Gollancz, 1980.
