= The Dragon in the Sea =

1956 novel by Frank Herbert

- Author: Frank Herbert
- Original title: Under Pressure
- Cover artist: Mel Hunter
- Language: English
- Genre: Psychological thriller
- Publisher: Doubleday & Company
- Publication date: 1956
- Publication place: United States
- Media type: Print (Hardcover & Paperback)
- Pages: 192

The Dragon in the Sea (1956), also known as Under Pressure from its serialization, is a novel by Frank Herbert. It was first serialized in Astounding magazine from 1955 to 1956, then reworked and published as a standalone novel in 1956. A 1961 2nd printing of the Avon paperback, catalog # G-1092, was titled 21st Century Sub with the previous title in parentheses, and a short 36 page version of the novel was later collected in Eye. It is usually classified as a psychological novel.

== Plot ==
In a near-future earth, the West and the East have been at war for more than a decade, and resources are running thin. The West is stealing oil from the East with specialised nuclear submarines that sneak into the underwater oil fields of the East to pump out the oil and bring it back. Each carrying a crew of four, these submarines undertake the most hazardous missions. The East has been very successful in planting sleeper agents in the West's military and command structures, and the suspicion is that sleepers are sabotaging the subs or revealing their positions once at sea. John Ramsey, a young psychologist from the Bureau of Psychology (BuPsych), is trained as an electronics operator and sent on the next mission, replacing the previous officer who went insane. His secret mission is to find the sleeper, or figure out why the crews are going insane.

Ramsey embeds undercover with a sub crew with the goal of secretly psychoanalyzing the captain and crew, partly using special emotion-monitoring equipment that he must keep hidden from the others aboard. Together they endure perilous situations including enemy submarines attempting to hunt them down, problems with the onboard nuclear reactor, radiation, mechanical disasters, electronics warfare, and the discovery of treachery and bugged equipment onboard. The crew members gain a respect for Ramsey despite their initial distrust of him. When Ramsey’s deceit is partly perceived or conjectured by the others, they seemingly misidentify him as an undercover security agent rather than an undercover psychologist or enemy spy. All 4 men share a distrust of one another in an atmosphere of paranoia mixed with a legitimate sense of naval camaraderie, professional duty, and sarcasm.

It is eventually discovered who the spy among them is. The crew wish to protect the person from punishment because of their genuine friendship and the fact that the ostensible traitor sacrificed themself for the sake of the others. It is also revealed that the spy was coerced to work for the enemy by threats to his family members, and that his motivation may be mixed with extreme disillusionment with the war. Aided by philosophical discussions with Captain Sparrow, Ramsey determines the cause of the seemingly epidemic “insanity” of the sub fleet crews: the physical and psychological conditions of the sub crews amid dystopian endless war, a daily threat of death, and a lack of acknowledgment or fanfare supposedly for security reasons.

The book ends with Ramsey and his mentor musing over their department’s ability to succeed in their own agenda in opposition to the ominous security department, and over Ramsey’s possible re-assignment to a comically undesired new role at the behest of higher-ups now that he’s seen as a hero because of his feats on the mission.

== Major themes ==
Herbert's portrayal of submarines towing large bags filled with surreptitiously pumped oil has been cited as an inspiration for the invention called the Dracone, for which development started in the year following Herbert's serial.

== Reception ==
Galaxy reviewer Floyd C. Gale praised Dragon in the Sea as "a dramatically fascinating story. . . . [a] tense and well-written novel." Algis Budrys described it as "hypnotically fascinating," praising Herbert's "intelligence, sophistication, [and] capacity for research" as well as his "ability to write clean prose as an unobtrusive but effective vehicle for a cleanly told story." Anthony Boucher found the novel "as impressive in its cumulative depiction of a specialized scientific background as anything since Hal Clement's Mission of Gravity." Spider Robinson, reviewing a mid-1970s reissue, faulted the novel's characterizations, saying "there are no real people in it, only psychological types and syndromes walking around on legs."

J. Francis McComas praised the novel in The New York Times, comparing it to Forester and Wouk and declaring, "In this fine blend of speculation and action, Mr. Herbert has created a novel that ranks with the best of modern science fiction."

== Awards ==
The Dragon in the Sea tied for number thirty-four in the 1975 Locus All-Time Poll.

== See also ==
- List of underwater science fiction works
