= The Book of Frank Herbert =

1973 publication by Frank Herbert

- Author: Frank Herbert
- Illustrator: Jack Gaughan
- Cover artist: Jack Gaughan
- Language: English
- Series: The Book of ... series
- Genre: Science fiction
- Publisher: DAW Books
- Publication date: 1973
- Publication place: United States
- Media type: Print (paperback)
- Pages: 189 pp
- Preceded by: The Book of Brian Aldiss
- Followed by: The Book of Philip K. Dick

The Book of Frank Herbert is a collection of science fiction short stories by author Frank Herbert. It was first published in paperback by DAW Books in January 1973 as the third volume in its Book of ... series, and was reprinted in May 1977. A second edition was issued by Berkley Books in May 1981, and reprinted in April 1983 and September 1984.The first British edition was published in paperback by Panther in 1977, and reprinted by Panther/Granada in 1984. The book has been translated into German.

== Summary ==
The book contains ten short works of fiction by the author, three of them published in it for the first time, and features a frontispiece by Jack Gaughan.. The second edition adds a concluding essay, "Listening to the Left Hand," by the author.

== Contents ==
- "Seed Stock" - short story - Analog, April 1970
- "The Nothing" - short story - Fantastic Universe, January 1956
- "Rat Race" - novelette - Astounding Science Fiction, July 1955
- "Gambling Device" - short story - first appearance, 1973
- "Looking for Something?" - short story - Startling Stories, April 1952
- "The Gone Dogs" - short story - Amazing Stories, November 1954
- "Passage for Piano" - short story - first appearance, 1973
- "Encounter in a Lonely Place" - short story – first appearance, 1973
- "Operation Syndrome" - novelette - Astounding Science Fiction, June 1954
- "Occupation Force" - short story - Fantastic, August 1955
- "Listening to the Left Hand" - essay - first appearance, 1981 (2nd ed. only)

== Reception ==
The collection was reviewed by Philip Stephensen-Payne in Paperback Parlour, August 1977.
