= The Dosadi Experiment =

1977 science fiction novel by Frank Herbert

- Cover of the first edition
- Author: Frank Herbert
- Language: English
- Series: ConSentient
- Genre: Science fiction
- Publisher: G. P. Putnam's Sons
- Publication date: 1977
- Publication place: United States
- Media type: Print (Hardcover & Paperback)
- ISBN: 0-399-12022-X
- OCLC: 2837037
- Dewey Decimal: 813/.5/4
- LC Class: PZ4.H5356 Do PS3558.E63
- Preceded by: Whipping Star
- Followed by: Eye

The Dosadi Experiment is a 1977 science fiction novel by American writer Frank Herbert. It is the second full-length novel set in the ConSentiency universe established by Herbert in his short stories "A Matter of Traces" and "The Tactful Saboteur", and continued in his novel Whipping Star. It was first published as a four-part serial in Galaxy Science Fiction magazine from May to August, 1977.

== Plot summary ==
The novel is set in a distant future when humans are part of an interstellar civilization, the ConSentiency, comprising numerous species including humans, Gowachin, and Caleban. The mysterious and powerful Caleban provide "jump-doors" (which allow instantaneous travel between any two points in the universe); this is the glue that holds the far-flung ConSentiency together. Unfortunately, one consequence of the technology is the possibility that large numbers of unsuspecting sentients can be diverted to destinations unknown for nefarious purposes. A government saboteur attempts to expose one such plot.

Jorj X. McKie is a Saboteur Extraordinary, one of the principals of the Bureau of Sabotage, and the only human admitted to practice law before the Gowachin bar as a legum (lawyer). Whilst meditating in a park on the grounds of the Bureau's headquarters, McKie is mentally contacted by the Caleban Fannie Mae, a nominally female member of a multidimensional species of unparalleled power, who cryptically explains his mission. (Their dialogue has elements of a lover's spat, which is indicative of the depth of their relationship.)

Generations ago, a secret, unauthorized experiment by the Gowachins was carried out with the help of a contract with the Calebans. The planet Dosadi was isolated behind an impenetrable barrier (called "The God Wall") and populated with humans and Gowachin. The planet and its biosphere are massively poisonous except for a deep narrow valley containing the city-state "Chu", into which nearly 89 million humans and Gowachin are crowded under terrible conditions. The culture of ordinary day-to-day power on Dosadi is hence extremely violent. At the time of the story Chu is ruled by a dictator. Numerous other governmental systems have been installed by DemoPol, a computer system used to manipulate the populace without its consent or knowledge. Furthermore, addictive drugs are a commonplace method of control.

In this milieu Senior Liator (or Liaitor) Keila Jedrik begins a war that will change Dosadi, and ultimately the ConSentiency itself forever. Jorj, having been thoroughly but narrowly briefed, arrives ignorant of what possible benefits the Dosadi experiment had been expected to yield. The saboteur and the bureaucrat join forces via ego sharing, and by using a hole in the contract isolating Dosadi they escape via jump gate. By further legal manoeuvring the Dosadi population itself is unleashed upon the ConSentiency for good or ill. The Gowachin, having sent McKie to Dosadi in the first place in the hopes of a solution more in keeping with their interests could be found, must deal with the consequences.

== Main characters ==
=== Jorj X. McKie ===
Jorj X. McKie is the leading saboteur extraordinary in the Bureau of Sabotage (BuSab), an organization found in The Dosadi Experiment as well as two earlier short stories. He is described as a squat and ugly man of Pacific Islander ancestry, with green eyes and a shock of red hair. The Gowachin say they feel their bones age in his presence, because when he smiles, he bears a remarkable resemblance to their "Frog god", the nearly-divine Lawgiver, Mrreg.

A troublemaker, Jorj McKie finds BuSab to be a natural outlet for his tendencies. McKie's success as a BuSab agent comes from his intelligence and sensitivity to the traditions of other races, combined with the ability to adapt to any circumstances. Sent by the agency to Dosadi as their "best", he was initially out of his depth among a people shaped by fifteen generations of violence. In less than a week he finds his bearings, and Keila Jedrik appraises him as "more Dosadi than Dosadi."

Despite his feelings of requited love for the Caleban Fannie Mae, McKie never forms long-term attachments to human women; his more than fifty marriages have been strictly transactional. Nevertheless, he finds in Keila Jedrik a companion who becomes more than a soul mate.

=== Keila Jedrik ===
Keila Jedrik is a human native of Dosadi with short, bristly black hair and icy blue eyes. She introduced a subtle flaw in the computer system governing food distribution, which eliminated her own position as "Senior Liaitor" (or Liator) along with the jobs of 49 other human beings. This small, dislodged pebble becomes the avalanche which leads to a full-scale race-war against the Gowachin, a crisis for which she had long prepared: Jedrik is the culmination of an eight-generation plan to break free of the God Wall enclosing Dosadi.

She captures McKie before he could fall into the hands of Dosadi's nominal ruler, Broey, whereupon the novel chronicles the character development of these two remarkable individuals in becoming utterly joined in body, mind, and purpose.

=== Broey ===
Elector Broey, the Gowachin ruler of Dosadi, is slow to recognize that the race riots are the beginning of a world war, much less one orchestrated by a mid-level functionary. Such is the crisis that after only a few days cuts his human allies loose to devote all of his resources defending a narrow corridor through Chu to the Rim and to the wider world. Acknowledging the superior abilities of Jedrik, he nevertheless dispatches suicide bombers to make her inevitable victory as costly as possible. He is shocked into personally surrendering to Jedrik, however, after the God Wall Caleban turns the sky of Dosadi black in preparation for the total destruction of the planet.

Later, temporarily allied with Jedrik, Broey seizes the reins of power throughout the ConSentiency universe after the God Wall contract is cancelled. Furthermore, he is the only judge to survive the courtarena when the Dosadi affair comes to trial. In the end, however, he only succeeds in providing a single target for the "ministrations" of the Bureau of Sabotage under its new leader, Jorj X. McKie.

== Reception ==
C. Ben Ostrander reviewed The Dosadi Experiment in The Space Gamer No. 13. Ostrander commented that "The wheels-within-wheels plotting is one of the most enjoyable reading experiences any SF fan can have. I recommend this book highly."

=== Awards ===
The Dosadi Experiment was nominated for a Locus Award for best science fiction novel in 1978 but lost to Frederik Pohl's novel Gateway.
