= Scandinavica =

Scandinavica may refer to:

Species

- Methylomonas scandinavica, Methylomonas
- Primula scandinavica, Primula
- Sarcocystis scandinavica, Sarcocystis

Ships

- MS Stena Scandinavica, ferry that goes between Gothenburg and Kiel
- MS Stena Scandinavica (1973)

Journals

- Scandinavica (journal)
- Acta Agriculturae Scandinavica
- Acta Anaesthesiologica Scandinavica
- Acta Chemica Scandinavica
- Acta Medica Scandinavica, since 1989 known as the Journal of Internal Medicine
- Acta Morphologica Neerlando-Scandinavica
- Acta Neurologica Scandinavica
- Acta Obstetricia et Gynecologica Scandinavica
- Acta Odontologica Scandinavica
- Acta Oecologica Scandinavica, a.k.a. Oikos
- Acta Ophthalmologica Scandinavica
- Acta Pathologica et Microbiologica Scandinavica
- Acta Pathologica, Microbiologica et Immunologica Scandinavica (APMIS)
- Acta Paediatrica Scandinavica
- Acta Psychiatrica Scandinavica
- Acta Physiologica Scandinavica
- Fauna Entomologica Scandinavica
- Ornis Scandinavica, a.k.a. Journal of Avian Biology

Books

- Scandinavica et Fenno-Ugrica (1954), by Björn Collinder
