= Dune (novel) =

1965 science fiction novel by Frank Herbert

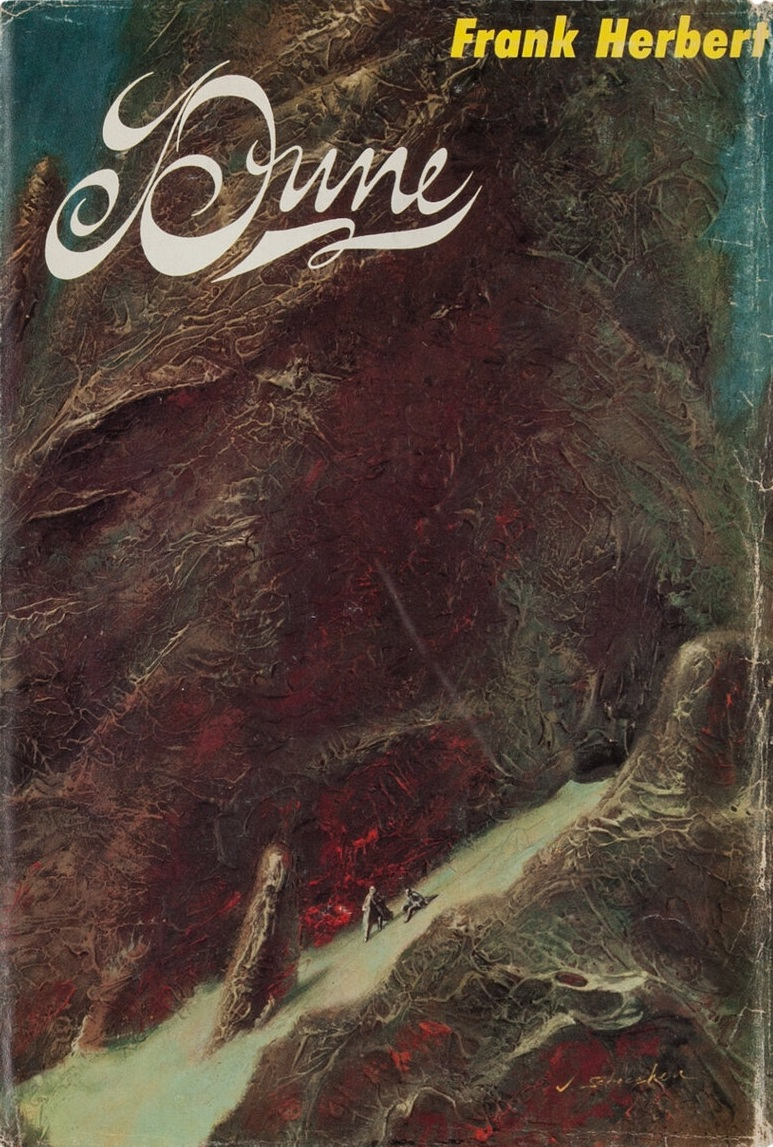
- First-edition cover
- Author: Frank Herbert
- Cover artist: John Schoenherr
- Language: English
- Series: Dune series
- Genre: Science fiction Philosophical fiction
- Published: October 1, 1965
- Publisher: Chilton Books
- Publication place: United States
- Media type: Print (hardcover & paperback)
- Pages: 412 (first edition); 896 (paperback)
- Awards: Hugo Award for Best Novel (1966); Nebula Award for Best Novel (1966); Seiun Award for Best Translated Long Work (1974); Locus All-Time Best Novel (1975); Locus All-Time Best SF Novel (1987); Locus All-Time Best SF Novel before 1990 (1998); Locus Online Best 20th Century SF Novel (2012)
- ISBN: 9780441013593
- OCLC: 1399967988
- Dewey Decimal: 813.54
- LC Class: PS3558.E63 D8
- Followed by: Dune Messiah

Dune is a 1965 epic science fiction novel by American author Frank Herbert, originally published as two separate serials (1963–64 novel Dune World and 1965 novel Prophet of Dune) in Analog magazine. It tied with Roger Zelazny's This Immortal for the Hugo Award for Best Novel and won the inaugural Nebula Award for Best Novel in 1966. It is the first installment of the Dune Chronicles. It is one of the world's best-selling science fiction novels.

Dune is set in the distant future in a feudal interstellar society, descended from terrestrial humans, in which various noble houses control planetary fiefs. It tells the story of young Paul Atreides, whose family reluctantly accepts the stewardship of the planet Arrakis. While the planet is an inhospitable and sparsely populated desert wasteland, it is the only source of melange or "spice", an enormously valuable drug that extends life and enhances mental abilities. Melange is also necessary for space navigation, which requires a kind of multidimensional awareness and foresight that only the drug provides. As melange can only be produced on Arrakis, control of the planet is a coveted and dangerous undertaking. The story explores the multilayered interactions of politics, religion, ecology, technology, and human emotion as the factions of the empire confront each other in a struggle for the control of Arrakis and its spice.

Herbert wrote five sequels: Dune Messiah, Children of Dune, God Emperor of Dune, Heretics of Dune, and Chapterhouse: Dune. Following Herbert's death in 1986, his son Brian Herbert and author Kevin J. Anderson continued the series in over a dozen additional novels since 1999.

Adaptations of the novel to cinema have been notoriously difficult and complicated. In the 1970s, cult filmmaker Alejandro Jodorowsky attempted to make a film based on the novel. After three years of development, the project was canceled due to a constantly growing budget. In 1984, a film adaptation directed by David Lynch was released to mostly negative responses from critics and failure at the box office, although it later developed a cult following. The book was also adapted into the 2000 Sci-Fi Channel miniseries Frank Herbert's Dune. A second film adaptation, directed by Denis Villeneuve, was released on October 22, 2021, to positive reviews. It went on to be nominated for ten Academy Awards, including Best Picture, ultimately winning six. Villeneuve's film covers roughly the first half of the original novel; a sequel, which covers the second half, was released on March 1, 2024, to critical acclaim. A third film is set to release on December 18, 2026, based on Dune Messiah, the sequel to Dune.

The series has also been used as the basis for several board, role-playing, and video games.

Since 2009, the names of planets from the Dune novels have been adopted for the real-life nomenclature of plains and other features on Saturn's moon Titan.

== Origins ==
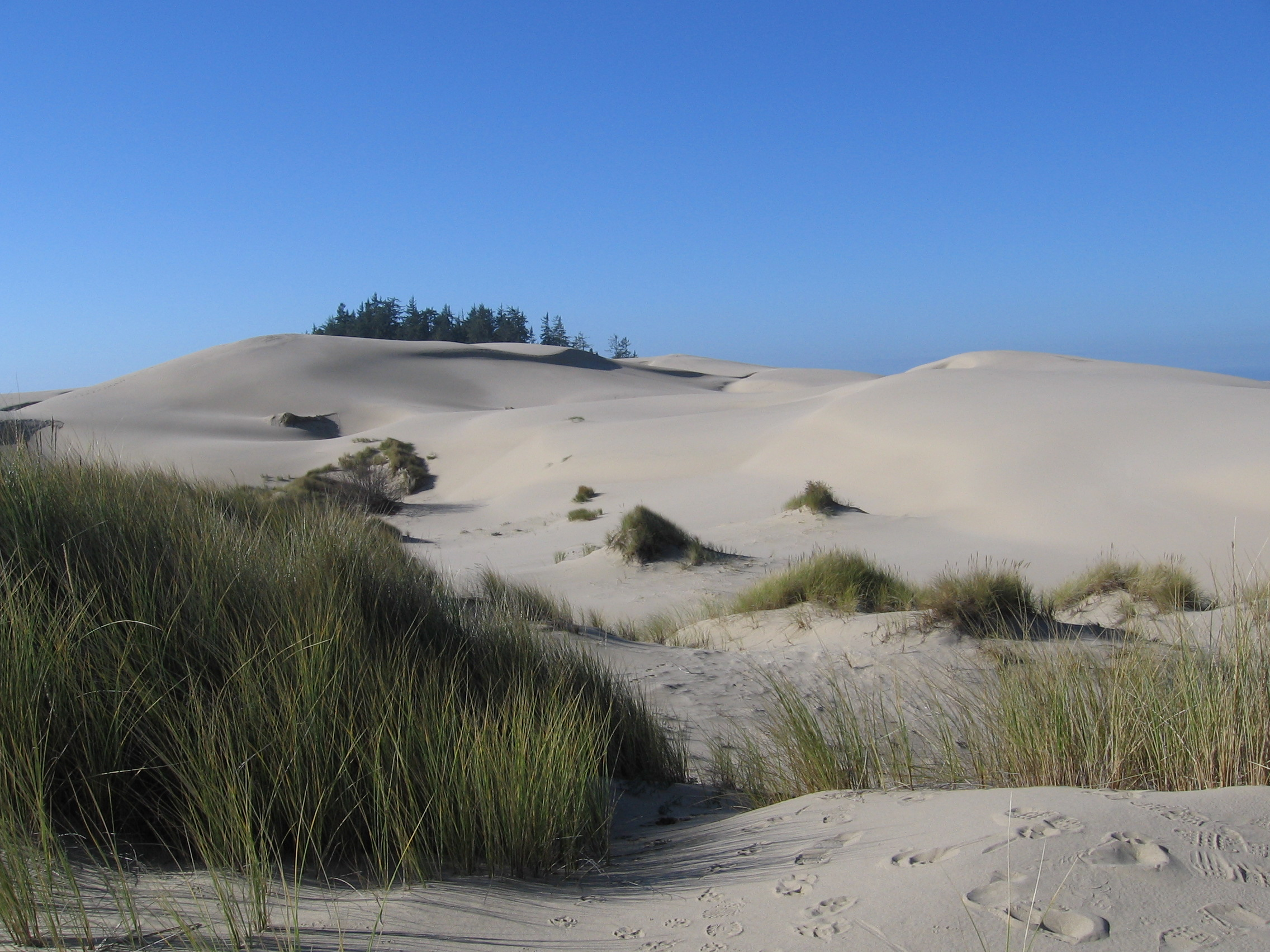
The Oregon Dunes, near Florence, Oregon, served as an inspiration for the Dune saga, specifically including the landscape on Arrakis.

After his novel The Dragon in the Sea was published in 1957, Herbert traveled to Florence, Oregon, at the north end of the Oregon Dunes. Here, the United States Department of Agriculture was attempting to use poverty grasses to stabilize the sand dunes. Herbert claimed in a letter to his literary agent, Lurton Blassingame, that the moving dunes could "swallow whole cities, lakes, rivers, highways." Herbert's article on the dunes, "They Stopped the Moving Sands", was never completed (and only published decades later in The Road to Dune), but its research sparked Herbert's interest in ecology and deserts.

Herbert further drew inspiration from Native American mentors like "Indian Henry" (the name Herbert's son recalls him using for a man otherwise likely called Henry Martin, of the Hoh tribe) and Howard Hansen. Both Martin and Hansen grew up on the Quileute reservation near Herbert's hometown. According to historian Daniel Immerwahr, Hansen regularly shared his writing with Herbert. "White men are eating the earth," Hansen told Herbert in 1958, after sharing a piece on the effect of logging on the Quileute reservation. "They're gonna turn this whole planet into a wasteland, just like North Africa." The world could become a "big dune," Herbert responded in agreement. Herbert began to consider an inspirational question for his fiction: "What if I had an entire planet that was a desert?" He applied to this to his developing concerns about religious leaders and messianic social changes in history.

Herbert believed that feudalism was a natural condition humans fell into, where some led and others gave up the responsibility of making decisions and just followed orders. He found that desert environments have historically given birth to several major religions with messianic impulses. He decided to join his interests together so he could play religious and ecological ideas against each other. In addition, he was influenced by the story of Lawrence of Arabia and the "messianic overtones" in Lawrence's involvement in the Arab Revolt during World War I. In an early version of Dune, the hero was actually very similar to Lawrence of Arabia, but Herbert decided the plot was too straightforward and added more layers to his story.

Herbert drew heavy inspiration also from Lesley Blanch's The Sabres of Paradise (1960), a narrative history recounting a mid-19th-century conflict in the Caucasus between rugged Caucasian Muslim tribes and the expanding Russian Empire. Language used on both sides of that conflict become terms in Herbert's world—Chakobsa, a Caucasian hunting language, becomes a battle language of humans spread across the galaxy; kanly, a word for blood feud in the 19th-century Caucasus, represents a feud between Dune's noble Houses; sietch and tabir are both words for camp borrowed from Ukrainian Cossacks (of the Pontic–Caspian steppe).

Herbert also borrowed some lines which Blanch stated were Caucasian proverbs. "To kill with the point lacked artistry", used by Blanch to describe the Caucasus peoples' love of swordsmanship, becomes in Dune "Killing with the tip lacks artistry", a piece of advice given to a young Paul during his training. "Polish comes from the city, wisdom from the hills", a Caucasian aphorism, turns into a desert expression: "Polish comes from the cities, wisdom from the desert".

Another potential source of inspiration for Dune was Herbert's alleged experiences with psilocybin and cultivating mushrooms, according to mycologist Paul Stamets's account of meeting Herbert in the 1980s:

Frank went on to tell me that much of the premise of Dune—the magic spice (spores) that allowed the bending of space (tripping), the giant sand worms (maggots digesting mushrooms), the eyes of the Freman (the cerulean blue of Psilocybe mushrooms), the mysticism of the female spiritual warriors, the Bene Gesserits (influenced by the tales of Maria Sabina and the sacred mushroom cults of Mexico)—came from his perception of the fungal life cycle, and his imagination was stimulated through his experiences with the use of magic mushrooms.

Herbert spent the next five years researching, writing, and revising. He wrote the majority of the initial Dune manuscript in San Francisco, where his family relocated in 1960 for his wife's job in advertising.

== Publication ==
Herbert published a three-part serial Dune World in the monthly Analog, from December 1963 to February 1964. The serial was accompanied by several illustrations that were not published again. After an interval of a year, he published the much slower-paced five-part The Prophet of Dune in the January–May 1965 issues. The first serial became "Book One: Dune" in the final published Dune novel, and the second serial was divided into "Book Two: Muad'dib" and "Book Three: The Prophet". The serialized version was expanded, reworked, and submitted to more than twenty publishers, each of whom rejected it. The novel, Dune, was finally accepted and published in August 1965 by Chilton Books, a printing house better known for publishing auto repair manuals. Sterling Lanier, an editor at Chilton, had seen Herbert's manuscript and had urged his company to take a risk in publishing the book. However, the first printing, priced at $5.95 (equivalent to $60.79 in 2025), did not sell well and was poorly received by critics as being atypical of science fiction at the time. Chilton considered the publication of Dune a write-off and Lanier was fired. Over the course of time, the book gained critical acclaim, and its popularity spread by word-of-mouth to allow Herbert to start working full time on developing the sequels to Dune, elements of which were already written alongside Dune.

At first Herbert considered using Mars as setting for his novel, but eventually decided to use a fictional planet instead. His son Brian said that "Readers would have too many preconceived ideas about that planet, due to the number of stories that had been written about it."

Herbert dedicated his work "to the people whose labors go beyond ideas into the realm of 'real materials'—to the dry-land ecologists, wherever they may be, in whatever time they work, this effort at prediction is dedicated in humility and admiration."

== Plot ==
Duke Leto Atreides of House Atreides, ruler of the ocean world Caladan, is assigned by the Padishah Emperor Shaddam IV to serve as fief ruler of the planet Arrakis. Although Arrakis is a harsh and inhospitable desert planet, it is of enormous importance because it is the only planetary source of melange, or the "spice", a unique and incredibly valuable substance that extends human youth, vitality and lifespan. It is also through the consumption of spice that Spacing Guild Navigators are able to effect safe interstellar travel through a limited ability to see into the future. The Emperor is jealous of the Duke's rising popularity in the Landsraad, the council of Great Houses, and sees House Atreides as a potential rival and threat. He conspires with House Harkonnen, the former stewards of Arrakis and the longstanding enemies of the Atreides, to destroy Leto and his family after their arrival. Leto is aware his assignment is a trap of some kind, but is compelled to obey the Emperor's orders anyway.

Leto's concubine Lady Jessica is an acolyte of the Bene Gesserit, an exclusively female group that pursues mysterious political aims and wields seemingly superhuman physical and mental abilities, such as the ability to control their bodies down to the cellular level, and also decide the sex of their children. Though Jessica was instructed by the Bene Gesserit to bear a daughter as part of their breeding program, out of love for Leto she bore him a son, Paul. From a young age, Paul is trained in warfare by Leto's aides, the elite soldiers Duncan Idaho and Gurney Halleck. Thufir Hawat, the Duke's Mentat (human computers, able to store vast amounts of data and perform advanced calculations on demand), has instructed Paul in the ways of political intrigue. Jessica has also trained her son in Bene Gesserit disciplines.

Paul's prophetic dreams interest Jessica's superior, the Reverend Mother Gaius Helen Mohiam. She subjects Paul to a deadly test. She holds a poisoned needle, the gom jabbar, to his neck, ready to strike should he withdraw his hand from a box which creates extreme pain by nerve induction but causes no physical damage. The purpose of the test is to appraise Paul's ability to endure the pain and override his animal instincts, proving that he is, in the eyes of the Bene Gesserit, human. Paul passes, while enduring greater pain than any woman who has ever been subjected to the same test.

Paul and his parents travel with their household to occupy Arrakeen, the capital of Arrakis. Leto learns of the dangers involved in harvesting the spice, which is protected by giant sandworms, and seeks to negotiate with the planet's indigenous Fremen people, seeing them as a valuable ally rather than foes. Soon after the Atreides' arrival, Harkonnen forces attack, joined by the Emperor's ferocious Sardaukar troops in disguise. Leto is betrayed by his personal physician, the Suk doctor Wellington Yueh, who delivers a drugged Leto to the Baron Vladimir Harkonnen and his twisted Mentat, Piter De Vries.

Yueh, who delivered Leto under duress related to his late wife, Wanna, arranges for Jessica and Paul to escape into the desert. Duncan is killed helping them flee, and they are subsequently presumed dead by the Harkonnens as they venture into a sandstorm. Yueh replaces one of Leto's teeth with a poison gas capsule, hoping Leto can kill Baron Harkonnen during their encounter. Piter kills Yueh, and the Baron narrowly avoids the gas (due to his defensive shield), which kills Leto, Piter, and the others in the room. The Baron seduces Thufir Hawat into becoming his replacement mentat by promising him "the most efficient spices" and denigrating Leto as "one whose reason was clouded by emotion," while secretly dosing him with an unremovable fatal poison, providing a daily antidote via his food, as security.

Having fled into the desert, Paul is exposed to high concentrations of spice and has visions through which he realizes he has significant powers (as a result of the Bene Gesserit breeding scheme). He foresees potential futures in which he lives among the Fremen before leading them on a holy war across the known universe. Paul reveals to Jessica that her father (and therefore his maternal grandfather) is Baron Harkonnen, a secret kept from her by the Bene Gesserit.

Paul and Jessica traverse the desert in search of Fremen people. After being captured by a Fremen band, Paul and Jessica agree to teach the Fremen the Bene Gesserit fighting technique known to the Fremen as the "weirding way" and are accepted into the community of Sietch Tabr. Paul proves his manhood by killing a Fremen man named Jamis in a ritualistic crysknife fight and chooses the Fremen name Muad'Dib, while Jessica opts to undergo a ritual to become a Reverend Mother by drinking and neutralizing the poisonous Water of Life. Pregnant with Leto's daughter, she inadvertently causes her unborn daughter Alia to become infused with the same powers in her womb. Paul takes a Fremen lover, Chani, who gives birth to his son Leto.

Two years pass, and Paul's powerful prescience manifests, which confirms to the Fremen that he is their prophesied "Lisan al-Gaib" messiah, a legend planted on Arrakis generations ago by the Bene Gesserit's Missionaria Protectiva. Paul embraces his father's belief that the Fremen could be a powerful fighting force to take back Arrakis, but also sees that if he does not control them, their jihad could consume the entire universe. Word of the new Fremen leader reaches both the Baron and the Emperor as spice production falls due to their increasingly destructive raids. The Baron encourages his brutish nephew Glossu "Beast" Rabban to rule with an iron fist, hoping the contrast with his shrewder nephew Feyd-Rautha will make the latter popular among the people of Arrakis when he eventually replaces Rabban. The Emperor, suspecting the Baron of trying to create troops more powerful than the Sardaukar to seize power, sends spies to Arrakis. Thufir uses the opportunity to sow seeds of doubt in the Baron about the Emperor's true plans, putting further strain on their alliance.

Gurney, who survived the Harkonnen coup and became a smuggler, reunites with Paul and Jessica after a Fremen raid on his harvester. Believing Jessica to be a traitor, Gurney threatens to kill her but is stopped by Paul. Paul did not foresee Gurney's attack and concludes he must increase his prescience by drinking the Water of Life, which is fatal to males. Paul falls into unconsciousness for three weeks after drinking a single drop of the poison, but when he wakes, he has clairvoyance across time and space: he is the Kwisatz Haderach, the ultimate goal of the Bene Gesserit breeding program.

Paul senses the Emperor and the Baron are amassing fleets around Arrakis to quell the Fremen rebellion, and prepares the Fremen for a major offensive. The Emperor arrives with the Baron on Arrakis. The Sardaukar seize a Fremen outpost, killing many, including young Leto, while Alia is captured and taken to the Emperor. Under cover of an electric storm which shorts out the Sardaukar's defensive shields, Paul and the Fremen destroy the capital's natural rock fortifications with atomics and attack on giant sandworms, while Alia assassinates the Baron and escapes. The Fremen quickly defeat both the Harkonnen and Sardaukar troops, killing Rabban in the process. Thufir is ordered to assassinate Paul, who gives him the opportunity to take anything that Thufir wishes of him. Thufir chooses to stab himself with the poisoned needle intended for Paul.

Paul faces the Emperor, threatening to destroy spice production forever unless Shaddam abdicates the throne. Feyd-Rautha challenges Paul to a knife fight, during which he cheats and tries to kill Paul with a poison spur in his belt. Paul gains the upper hand and kills him. The Emperor reluctantly cedes the throne to Paul and promises his daughter Princess Irulan's hand in marriage. Paul takes control of the Empire, but realizes that he cannot stop the Fremen jihad, as their belief in him is too powerful to restrain.

== Characters ==
House Atreides

- Duke Leto Atreides, head of House Atreides
- Lady Jessica, Bene Gesserit and concubine of the Duke, mother of Paul and Alia
- Paul Atreides, son of Leto and Jessica
- Alia Atreides, Paul's younger sister
- Thufir Hawat, Mentat and Master of Assassins to House Atreides
- Gurney Halleck, staunchly loyal troubadour warrior of the Atreides
- Duncan Idaho, Swordmaster for House Atreides, graduate of the Ginaz School
- Wellington Yueh, Suk doctor for the Atreides who is secretly working for House Harkonnen

House Harkonnen

- Baron Vladimir Harkonnen, head of House Harkonnen
- Piter De Vries, twisted Mentat
- Feyd-Rautha, nephew and heir-presumptive of the Baron
- Glossu "Beast" Rabban, also called Rabban Harkonnen, older nephew of the Baron
- Iakin Nefud, Captain of the Guard

House Corrino

- Shaddam IV, Padishah Emperor of the Known Universe (the Imperium)
- Princess Irulan, Shaddam's eldest daughter and heir, also a historian
- Count Fenring, the Emperor's closest friend, advisor, and "errand boy"

Bene Gesserit

- Reverend Mother Gaius Helen Mohiam, Proctor Superior of the Bene Gesserit school and the Emperor's Truthsayer
- Lady Margot Fenring, Bene Gesserit wife of Count Fenring

Fremen

- The Fremen, native inhabitants of Arrakis
- Stilgar, Fremen leader of Sietch Tabr
- Chani, Paul's Fremen concubine and a Sayyadina (female acolyte) of Sietch Tabr
- Dr. Liet-Kynes, the Imperial Planetologist on Arrakis and father of Chani, as well as a revered figure among the Fremen
- The Shadout Mapes, head housekeeper of imperial residence on Arrakis
- Jamis, Fremen killed by Paul in ritual duel
- Harah, wife of Jamis and later servant to Paul who helps raise Alia among the Fremen
- Reverend Mother Ramallo, religious leader of Sietch Tabr

Smugglers

- Esmar Tuek, a powerful smuggler and the father of Staban Tuek
- Staban Tuek, the son of Esmar Tuek and a powerful smuggler who befriends and takes in Gurney Halleck and his surviving men after the attack on the Atreides

== Themes and influences ==
The Dune series is a landmark of science fiction. Herbert deliberately suppressed technology in his Dune universe so he could address the politics of humanity, rather than the future of humanity's technology. For example, a key pre-history event to the novel's present is the "Butlerian Jihad", in which all robots and computers were destroyed, eliminating these common elements to science fiction from the novel as to allow focus on humanity. Dune considers the way humans and their institutions might change over time. Director John Harrison, who adapted Dune for Syfy's 2000 miniseries, called the novel a universal and timeless reflection of "the human condition and its moral dilemmas", and said:

A lot of people refer to Dune as science fiction. I never do. I consider it an epic adventure in the classic storytelling tradition, a story of myth and legend not unlike the Morte d'Arthur or any messiah story. It just happens to be set in the future ... The story is actually more relevant today than when Herbert wrote it. In the 1960s, there were just these two colossal superpowers duking it out. Today we're living in a more feudal, corporatized world more akin to Herbert's universe of separate families, power centers and business interests, all interrelated and kept together by the one commodity necessary to all.

Dune has also been described as a mix of soft and hard science fiction since "the attention to ecology is hard, the anthropology and the psychic abilities are soft." Hard elements include the ecology of Arrakis, suspensor technology, weapon systems, and ornithopters, while soft elements include issues relating to religion, physical and mental training, cultures, politics, and psychology.

Herbert said Paul's messiah figure was inspired by the Arthurian legend, and that the scarcity of water on Arrakis was a metaphor for oil, as well as air and water itself, and for the shortages of resources caused by overpopulation. Novelist Brian Herbert, his son and biographer, wrote:

Dune is a modern-day conglomeration of familiar myths, a tale in which great sandworms guard a precious treasure of melange, the geriatric spice that represents, among other things, the finite resource of oil. The planet Arrakis features immense, ferocious worms that are like dragons of lore, with "great teeth" and a "bellows breath of cinnamon." This resembles the myth described by an unknown English poet in Beowulf, the compelling tale of a fearsome fire dragon who guarded a great treasure hoard in a lair under cliffs, at the edge of the sea. The desert of Frank Herbert's classic novel is a vast ocean of sand, with giant worms diving into the depths, the mysterious and unrevealed domain of Shai-hulud. Dune tops are like the crests of waves, and there are powerful sandstorms out there, creating extreme danger. On Arrakis, life is said to emanate from the Maker (Shai-hulud) in the desert-sea; similarly all life on Earth is believed to have evolved from our oceans. Frank Herbert drew parallels, used spectacular metaphors, and extrapolated present conditions into world systems that seem entirely alien at first blush. But close examination reveals they aren't so different from systems we know ... and the book characters of his imagination are not so different from people familiar to us.

Each chapter of Dune begins with an epigraph excerpted from the fictional writings of the character Princess Irulan. In forms such as diary entries, historical commentary, biography, quotations and philosophy, these writings set tone and provide exposition, context and other details intended to enhance understanding of Herbert's complex fictional universe and themes. They act as foreshadowing and invite the reader to keep reading to close the gap between what the epigraph says and what is happening in the main narrative. The epigraphs also give the reader the feeling that the world they are reading about is epically distanced, since Irulan writes about an idealized image of Paul as if he had already passed into memory. Brian Herbert wrote: "Dad told me that you could follow any of the novel's layers as you read it, and then start the book all over again, focusing on an entirely different layer. At the end of the book, he intentionally left loose ends and said he did this to send the readers spinning out of the story with bits and pieces of it still clinging to them, so that they would want to go back and read it again."

=== Middle-Eastern and Islamic references ===
Due to the similarities between some of Herbert's terms and ideas and actual words and concepts in the Arabic language, as well as the series' "Islamic undertones" and themes, a Middle-Eastern influence on Herbert's works has been noted repeatedly. In his descriptions of the Fremen culture and language, Herbert uses both authentic Arabic words and Arabic-sounding words. For example, one of the names for the sandworm, Shai-hulud, is derived from شيء خلود, šayʾ ḫulūd, 'immortal thing' or شيخ خلود, šayḫ ḫulūd, 'old man of eternity'. The title of the Fremen housekeeper, the Shadout Mapes, is borrowed from the شادوف, šādūf, the Egyptian term for a device used to raise water. In particular, words related to the messianic religion of the Fremen, first implanted by the Bene Gesserit, are taken from Arabic, including Muad'Dib (from مؤدب, muʾaddib, 'educator'), Lisan al-Gaib (from لسان الغيب, lisān al-ġayb, 'voice of the unseen'), Usul (from أصول, ʾuṣūl, 'fundamental principles'), Shari-a (from شريعة, šarīʿa, 'sharia; path'), Shaitan (from شيطان, šayṭān, 'Shaitan; devil; fiend'), and jinn (from جن, ǧinn, 'jinn; spirit; demon; mythical being'). It is likely Herbert relied on second-hand resources such as phrasebooks and desert adventure stories to find these Arabic words and phrases for the Fremen. They are meaningful and carefully chosen, and help create an "imagined desert culture that resonates with exotic sounds, enigmas, and pseudo-Islamic references" and has a distinctly Bedouin aesthetic.

As a foreigner who adopts the ways of a desert-dwelling people and then leads them in a military capacity, Paul Atreides bears many similarities to the historical T. E. Lawrence. His 1962 biopic Lawrence of Arabia has also been identified as a potential influence. The Sabres of Paradise (1960) has also been identified as a potential influence upon Dune, with its depiction of Imam Shamil and the Islamic culture of the Caucasus inspiring some of the themes, characters, events and terminology of Dune.

The environment of the desert planet Arrakis was primarily inspired by the environments of the Middle East. Similarly Arrakis as a bioregion is presented as a particular kind of political site. Herbert has made it resemble a desertified petrostate area. The Fremen people of Arrakis were influenced by the Bedouin tribes of Arabia, and the Mahdi prophecy originates from Islamic eschatology. Inspiration is also adopted from medieval historian Ibn Khaldun's cyclical history and his dynastic concept in North Africa, hinted at by Herbert's reference to Khaldun's book Kitāb al-ʿibar ("The Book of Lessons"). The fictionalized version of the "Kitab al-ibar" in Dune is a combination of a Fremen religious manual and a desert survival book.

==== Additional language and historic influences ====
In addition to Arabic, Dune derives words and names from a variety of other languages, including Navajo, Latin, Old Scandinavian ("Landsraad"), Romani, Hebrew ("Kefitzat haderech", קפיצת הדרך, contracting of the path), Serbo-Croatian, Nahuatl, Greek, Persian, Sanskrit ("prana bindu", "prajna"), Russian, Turkish, Finnish, and Old English. Bene Gesserit is part of the Latin legal phrase quamdiu se bene gesserit "as long as he shall behave himself well" seen in grants of certain offices (such as judgeships) meaning that the appointee shall remain in office so long as he shall not be guilty of abusing it. Some critics miss the connotation of the phrase, misled by the Latin future perfect gesserit, taking it over-literally (and adding an unwarranted passive) to mean "it will have been well borne", an interpretation which is not well supported by the Bene Gesserit doctrine in the story.

Through the inspiration from The Sabres of Paradise, there are also allusions to the tsarist-era Russian nobility and Cossacks. Frank Herbert stated that bureaucracy that lasted long enough would become a hereditary nobility, and a significant theme behind the aristocratic families in Dune was "aristocratic bureaucracy" which he saw as analogous to the Soviet Union.

=== Environmentalism and ecology ===
Dune has been called the "first planetary ecology novel on a grand scale". Herbert hoped it would be seen as an "environmental awareness handbook" and said the title was meant to "echo the sound of 'doom'". It was reviewed in the best-selling countercultural Whole Earth Catalog in 1968 as a "rich re-readable fantasy with clear portrayal of the fierce environment it takes to cohere a community".

After the publication of Silent Spring by Rachel Carson in 1962, science fiction writers began treating the subject of ecological change and its consequences. Dune responded in 1965 with its complex descriptions of Arrakis life, from giant sandworms (for whom water is deadly) to smaller, mouse-like life-forms adapted to live with limited water. Dune was followed in its creation of complex and unique ecologies by other science fiction books such as A Door into Ocean (1986) and Red Mars (1992). Environmentalists have pointed out that Dune's popularity as a novel depicting a planet as a complex—almost living—thing, in combination with the first images of Earth from space being published in the same time period, strongly influenced environmental movements such as the establishment of the international Earth Day.

While the genre of climate fiction was popularized in the 2010s in response to real-world climate change, Dune as well as other early science fiction works from authors like J. G. Ballard (The Drowned World) and Kim Stanley Robinson (the Mars trilogy) have retroactively been considered pioneering examples of the genre.

=== Declining empires ===
The Imperium in Dune contains features of various empires in Europe and the Near East, including the Roman Empire, Holy Roman Empire, and Ottoman Empire. Lorenzo DiTommaso compared Dune's portrayal of the downfall of a galactic empire to Edward Gibbon's Decline and Fall of the Roman Empire, which argues that Christianity allied with the profligacy of the Roman elite led to the fall of Ancient Rome. In "The Articulation of Imperial Decadence and Decline in Epic Science Fiction" (2007), DiTommaso outlines similarities between the two works by highlighting the excesses of the Emperor on his home planet of Kaitain and of the Baron Harkonnen in his palace. The Emperor loses his effectiveness as a ruler through an excess of ceremony and pomp. The hairdressers and attendants he brings with him to Arrakis are even referred to as "parasites". The Baron Harkonnen is similarly corrupt and materially indulgent. Gibbon's Decline and Fall partly blames the fall of Rome on the rise of Christianity. Gibbon claimed that this exotic import from a conquered province weakened the soldiers of Rome and left it open to attack. The Emperor's Sardaukar fighters are little match for the Fremen of Dune not only because of the Sardaukar's overconfidence and the fact that Jessica and Paul have trained the Fremen in their battle tactics, but because of the Fremen's capacity for self-sacrifice. The Fremen put the community before themselves in every instance, while the world outside wallows in luxury at the expense of others.

The decline and long peace of the Empire sets the stage for revolution and renewal by genetic mixing of successful and unsuccessful groups through war, a process culminating in the Jihad led by Paul Atreides, described by Frank Herbert as depicting "war as a collective orgasm" (drawing on Norman Walter's 1950 The Sexual Cycle of Human Warfare), themes that would reappear in God Emperor of Dune's Scattering and Leto II's all-female Fish Speaker army.

=== Gender dynamics ===
Gender dynamics are complex in Dune. Herbert offers a multi-layered portrayal of gender roles within the context of a feudal, hierarchical society, particularly through the Bene Gesserit Sisterhood. Although the Bene Gesserit tend to hold roles that are traditionally associated with women, such as wives, concubines, and mothers, their characters transcend stereotypes as they play politics and pursue long-term strategic goals. Full gender equality is not depicted in Dune, but the Bene Gesserit use specialized training and access to high-ranking men to gain agency and power within the constraints of their environment. Their training in prana-bindu allows them to exert control over their minds and bodies, including over pregnancy, and they are skilled in hand-to-hand combat and use of the Voice to command others. Jessica's disobedience in bearing a son instead of daughter and training him in the Bene Gesserit Way is a major plot point that sets in motion the events of the novel. By setting up certain women with leaders of certain Houses in the Imperium, the Bene Gesserit can control bloodlines across generations through their secret breeding program. Even within the male-dominated Imperium, then, the Bene Gesserit wield reproductive power and choose which genetic markers to continue into the future.

Reverend Mother Mohiam uses skills in Truthsaying to act as the Emperor's official Truthsayer and advisor. Her role can be considered similar to that of abbesses in the medieval Church. Before Princess Irulan appears as a character who agrees to a political marriage with Paul, she acts as a historian who shapes the reader's interpretation of the story and Paul's legacy due to the excerpts from her writing that frame each chapter.

Among the Fremen, women have roles as mothers and wives and also exercise agency through combat and religious authority. Fremen women and children have a reputation for being just as violent and dangerous as Fremen men. Chani travels with Stilgar in his military party, armed like the others. After becoming Paul's concubine, she kills one of the men who comes to challenge him. Alia leads an attack against the Emperor's Sardaukar and kills Baron Harkonnen with a gom jabbar. Women also take on the role of religious leaders. Chani is a Sayyadina who presides over tribal rituals such as Paul's worm-riding test, and Reverend Mother Ramallo carries the tribe's memories and passes them along to Jessica through the Water of Life ceremony. Within the male-led sietches, Fremen women find different avenues of authority.

The gom jabbar test of humanity is administered by the female Bene Gesserit order but rarely to males. The Bene Gesserit have seemingly mastered the unconscious and can play on the unconscious weaknesses of others using the Voice, yet their breeding program seeks after a male Kwisatz Haderach. Their plan is to produce a male who can "possess complete racial memory, both male and female," and look into the black hole in the collective unconscious that they fear. A central theme of the book is the connection, in Jessica's son, of this female aspect with his male aspect. This aligns with concepts in Jungian psychology, which features conscious/unconscious and taking/giving roles associated with males and females, as well as the idea of the collective unconscious. Paul's approach to power consistently requires his upbringing under the matriarchal Bene Gesserit, who operate as a long-dominating shadow government behind all of the great houses and their marriages or divisions. He is trained by Jessica in the Bene Gesserit Way, which includes prana-bindu training in nerve and muscle control and precise perception. Paul also receives Mentat training, thus helping prepare him to be a type of androgynous Kwisatz Haderach, a male Reverend Mother.

In a Bene Gesserit test early in the book, it is implied that people are generally "inhuman" in that they irrationally place desire over self-interest and reason. This applies Herbert's philosophy that humans are not created equal, while equal justice and equal opportunity are higher ideals than mental, physical, or moral equality.

=== Heroism ===
I am showing you the superhero syndrome and your own participation in it.

— Frank Herbert

Throughout Paul's rise to superhuman status, he follows a plotline common to many stories describing the birth of a hero. He has unfortunate circumstances forced onto him. After a long period of hardship and exile, he confronts and defeats the source of evil in his tale. As such, Dune is representative of a general trend beginning in 1960s American science fiction in that it features a character who attains godlike status through scientific means. Eventually, Paul Atreides gains a level of omniscience which allows him to take over the planet and the galaxy, and causes the Fremen of Arrakis to worship him like a god. Author Frank Herbert said in 1979, "The bottom line of the Dune trilogy is: beware of heroes. Much better to rely on your own judgment, and your own mistakes." He wrote in 1985, "Dune was aimed at this whole idea of the infallible leader because my view of history says that mistakes made by a leader (or made in a leader's name) are amplified by the numbers who follow without question."

Juan A. Prieto-Pablos says Herbert achieves a new typology with Paul's superpowers, differentiating the heroes of Dune from earlier heroes such as Superman, van Vogt's Gilbert Gosseyn and Henry Kuttner's telepaths. Unlike previous superheroes who acquire their powers suddenly and accidentally, Paul's are the result of "painful and slow personal progress." And unlike other superheroes of the 1960s—who are the exception among ordinary people in their respective worlds—Herbert's characters grow their powers through "the application of mystical philosophies and techniques." For Herbert, the ordinary person can develop incredible fighting skills (Fremen, Ginaz swordsmen and Sardaukar) or mental abilities (Bene Gesserit, Mentats, Spacing Guild Navigators).

=== Zen and religion ===
Early in his newspaper career, Herbert was introduced to Zen by two Jungian psychologists, Ralph and Irene Slattery, who "gave a crucial boost to his thinking". Zen teachings ultimately had "a profound and continuing influence on [Herbert's] work". Throughout the Dune series and particularly in Dune, Herbert employs concepts and forms borrowed from Zen Buddhism. The Fremen are referred to as Zensunni adherents, and many of Herbert's epigraphs are Zen-spirited. In "Dune Genesis", Frank Herbert wrote:

What especially pleases me is to see the interwoven themes, the fugue like relationships of images that exactly replay the way Dune took shape. As in an Escher lithograph, I involved myself with recurrent themes that turn into paradox. The central paradox concerns the human vision of time. What about Paul's gift of prescience—the Presbyterian fixation? For the Delphic Oracle to perform, it must tangle itself in a web of predestination. Yet predestination negates surprises and, in fact, sets up a mathematically enclosed universe whose limits are always inconsistent, always encountering the unprovable. It's like a koan, a Zen mind breaker. It's like the Cretan Epimenides saying, "All Cretans are liars."

Brian Herbert called the Dune universe "a spiritual melting pot", noting that his father incorporated elements of a variety of religions, including Buddhism, Sufi mysticism and other Islamic belief systems, Catholicism, Protestantism, Judaism, and Hinduism. He added that Frank Herbert's fictional future in which "religious beliefs have combined into interesting forms" represents the author's solution to eliminating arguments between religions, each of which claimed to have "the one and only revelation."

=== Asimov's Foundation ===
Tim O'Reilly suggests that Herbert also wrote Dune as a counterpoint to Isaac Asimov's Foundation series. In his monograph on Frank Herbert, O'Reilly wrote that "Dune is clearly a commentary on the Foundation trilogy. Herbert has taken a look at the same imaginative situation that provoked Asimov's classic—the decay of a galactic empire—and restated it in a way that draws on different assumptions and suggests radically different conclusions. The twist he has introduced into Dune is that the Mule, not the Foundation, is his hero." According to O'Reilly, Herbert bases the Bene Gesserit on the scientific shamans of the Foundation, though they use biological rather than statistical science. In contrast to the Foundation series and its praise of science and rationality, Dune proposes that the unconscious and unexpected are actually what are needed for humanity.

Both Herbert and Asimov explore the implications of prescience (i.e., visions of the future) both psychologically and socially. The Foundation series deploys a broadly determinist approach to prescient vision rooted in mathematical reasoning on a macroscopic social level. Dune, by contrast, invents a biologically rooted power of prescience that becomes determinist when the user actively relies on it to navigate past an undefined threshold of detail. Herbert's eugenically produced and spice-enhanced prescience is also personalized to individual actors whose roles in later books constrain each other's visions, rendering the future more or less mutable as time progresses. In what might be a comment on Foundation, Herbert's most powerfully prescient being in God Emperor of Dune laments the boredom engendered by prescience, and values surprises, especially regarding one's death, as a psychological necessity.

However, both works contain a similar theme of the restoration of civilization and seem to make the fundamental assumption that "political maneuvering, the need to control material resources, and friendship or mating bonds will be fundamentally the same in the future as they are now."

== Critical reception ==
Dune tied with Roger Zelazny's This Immortal for the Hugo Award in 1966 and won the inaugural Nebula Award for Best Novel. Reviews of the novel have been largely positive, and Dune is considered by some critics to be the best science fiction book ever written. The novel has been translated into dozens of languages, and has sold almost 20 million copies. Dune has been regularly cited as one of the world's best-selling science fiction novels.

Arthur C. Clarke described Dune as "unique" and wrote, "I know nothing comparable to it except The Lord of the Rings." Robert A. Heinlein described the novel as "powerful, convincing, and most ingenious." It was described as "one of the monuments of modern science fiction" by the Chicago Tribune, and P. Schuyler Miller called Dune "one of the landmarks of modern science fiction ... an amazing feat of creation." The Washington Post described it as "a portrayal of an alien society more complete and deeply detailed than any other author in the field has managed ... a story absorbing equally for its action and philosophical vistas ... An astonishing science fiction phenomenon." Algis Budrys praised Dune for the vividness of its imagined setting, saying "The time lives. It breathes, it speaks, and Herbert has smelt it in his nostrils". He found that the novel, however, "turns flat and tails off at the end. ... [T]ruly effective villains simply simper and melt; fierce men and cunning statesmen and seeresses all bend before this new Messiah". Budrys faulted in particular Herbert's decision to kill Paul's infant son offstage, with no apparent emotional impact, saying "you cannot be so busy saving a world that you cannot hear an infant shriek". After criticizing unrealistic science fiction, Carl Sagan in 1978 listed Dune as among stories "that are so tautly constructed, so rich in the accommodating details of an unfamiliar society that they sweep me along before I have even a chance to be critical".

The Louisville Times wrote, "Herbert's creation of this universe, with its intricate development and analysis of ecology, religion, politics, and philosophy, remains one of the supreme and seminal achievements in science fiction." Writing for The New Yorker, Jon Michaud praised Herbert's "clever authorial decision" to exclude robots and computers ("two staples of the genre") from his fictional universe, but suggested that this may be one explanation why Dune lacks "true fandom among science-fiction fans" to the extent that it "has not penetrated popular culture in the way that The Lord of the Rings and Star Wars have". Tamara I. Hladik wrote that the story "crafts a universe where lesser novels promulgate excuses for sequels. All its rich elements are in balance and plausible—not the patchwork confederacy of made-up languages, contrived customs, and meaningless histories that are the hallmark of so many other, lesser novels."

On November 5, 2019, the BBC News listed Dune on its list of the 100 most inspiring novels.

J. R. R. Tolkien refused to review Dune, on the grounds that he disliked it "with some intensity" and thus felt it would be unfair to Herbert, another working author, if he gave an honest review of the book.

== First edition prints and manuscripts ==
The first edition of Dune is one of the most valuable in science fiction book collecting. Copies have been sold for more than $20,000 at auction.

California State University, Fullerton's Pollak Library has several of Herbert's draft manuscripts of Dune and other works, with the author's notes, in their Frank Herbert Archives.

== Sequels and prequels ==
After Dune proved to be a critical and financial success for Herbert, he was able to devote himself full time to writing additional novels in the series. He had already drafted parts of the second and third while writing Dune. The series included Dune Messiah (1969), Children of Dune (1976), God Emperor of Dune (1981), Heretics of Dune (1984), and Chapterhouse: Dune (1985), each sequentially continuing on the narrative from Dune. Herbert died on February 11, 1986.

Herbert's son, Brian Herbert, had found several thousand pages of notes left by his father that outlined ideas for other narratives related to Dune. Brian Herbert enlisted author Kevin J. Anderson to help build out prequel novels to the events of Dune. Brian Herbert's and Anderson's Dune prequels first started publication in 1999, and have led to additional stories that take place between those of Frank Herbert's books. The notes for what would have been Dune 7 also enabled them to publish Hunters of Dune (2006) and Sandworms of Dune (2007), sequels to Frank Herbert's final novel Chapterhouse: Dune, which complete the chronological progression of his original series, and wrap up storylines that began in Heretics of Dune.

== Adaptations ==
Dune has been considered an "unfilmable" and "uncontainable" work to adapt from novel to film or other visual medium. Described by Wired, "It has four appendices and a glossary of its own gibberish, and its action takes place on two planets, one of which is a desert overrun by worms the size of airport runways. Lots of important people die or try to kill each other, and they're all tethered to about eight entangled subplots." There have been several attempts to achieve this difficult conversion with various degrees of success.

=== Early stalled attempts ===
In 1972, the production company Apjac International (APJ) (headed by Arthur P. Jacobs) optioned the rights to film Dune. As Jacobs was busy with other projects, such as the sequel to Planet of the Apes, Dune was delayed for another year. Jacobs' first choice for director was David Lean, but he turned down the offer. Charles Jarrott was also considered to direct. Work was also under way on a script while the hunt for a director continued. Initially, the first treatment had been handled by Robert Greenhut, the producer who had lobbied Jacobs to make the movie in the first place, but subsequently Rospo Pallenberg was approached to write the script, with shooting scheduled to begin in 1974. However, Jacobs died in 1973.

Pre-release flyer for Jodorowsky's Dune

In December 1974, a French consortium led by Jean-Paul Gibon purchased the film rights from APJ, with Alejandro Jodorowsky set to direct. In 1975, Jodorowsky planned to film the story as a 3-hour feature, set to star his own son Brontis Jodorowsky in the lead role of Paul Atreides, Salvador Dalí as Shaddam IV, Padishah Emperor, Amanda Lear as Princess Irulan, Orson Welles as Baron Vladimir Harkonnen, Gloria Swanson as Reverend Mother Gaius Helen Mohiam, David Carradine as Duke Leto Atreides, Geraldine Chaplin as Lady Jessica, Alain Delon as Duncan Idaho, Hervé Villechaize as Gurney Halleck, Udo Kier as Piter De Vries, and Mick Jagger as Feyd-Rautha. It was at first proposed to score the film with original music by Karlheinz Stockhausen, Henry Cow, and Magma; later on, the soundtrack was to be provided by Pink Floyd. Jodorowsky set up a pre-production unit in Paris consisting of Chris Foss, a British artist who designed covers for science fiction periodicals, Jean Giraud (Moebius), a French illustrator who created and also wrote and drew for Metal Hurlant magazine, and H. R. Giger. Moebius began designing creatures and characters for the film, while Foss was brought in to design the film's space ships and hardware. Giger began designing the Harkonnen Castle based on Moebius's storyboards. Dan O'Bannon was to head the special effects department.

Dalí was cast as the Emperor. Dalí later demanded to be paid $100,000 per hour; Jodorowsky agreed, but tailored Dalí's part to be filmed in one hour, drafting plans for other scenes of the emperor to use a mechanical mannequin as substitute for Dalí. According to Giger, Dalí was "later invited to leave the film because of his pro-Franco statements". Just as the storyboards, designs, and script were finished, the financial backing dried up. Frank Herbert traveled to Europe in 1976 to find that $2 million of the $9.5 million budget had already been spent in pre-production, and that Jodorowsky's script would result in a 14-hour movie ("It was the size of a phone book", Herbert later recalled). Jodorowsky took creative liberties with the source material, but Herbert said that he and Jodorowsky had an amicable relationship. Jodorowsky said in 1985 that he found the Dune story mythical and had intended to re-create it rather than adapt the novel; though he had an "enthusiastic admiration" for Herbert, Jodorowsky said he had done everything possible to distance the author and his input from the project. Although Jodorowsky was embittered by the experience, he said the Dune project changed his life, and some of the ideas were used in his and Moebius's The Incal. O'Bannon entered a psychiatric hospital after the production failed, then worked on 13 scripts, the last of which became Alien. A 2013 documentary, Jodorowsky's Dune, was made about Jodorowsky's failed attempt at an adaptation.

In 1976, Dino De Laurentiis acquired the rights from Gibon's consortium. De Laurentiis commissioned Herbert to write a new screenplay in 1978; the script Herbert turned in was 175 pages long, the equivalent of nearly three hours of screen time. De Laurentiis then hired director Ridley Scott in 1979, with Rudy Wurlitzer writing the screenplay and H. R. Giger retained from the Jodorowsky production; Scott and Giger had also just worked together on the film Alien, after O'Bannon recommended the artist. Scott intended to split the novel into two movies. He worked on three drafts of the script, using The Battle of Algiers as a point of reference, before moving on to direct another science fiction film, Blade Runner (1982). As he recalls, the pre-production process was slow, and finishing the project would have been even more time-intensive:

But after seven months I dropped out of Dune, by then Rudy Wurlitzer had come up with a first-draft script which I felt was a decent distillation of Frank Herbert's. But I also realised Dune was going to take a lot more work—at least two and a half years' worth. And I didn't have the heart to attack that because my older brother Frank unexpectedly died of cancer while I was prepping the De Laurentiis picture. Frankly, that freaked me out. So I went to Dino and told him the Dune script was his.

—From Ridley Scott: The Making of his Movies by Paul M. Sammon

A draft of the screenplay for the Scott version was discovered in 2024 in the Wheaton College archives.

=== 1984 film by David Lynch ===
In 1981, the nine-year film rights were set to expire. De Laurentiis re-negotiated the rights from the author, adding to them the rights to the Dune sequels (written and unwritten). After seeing The Elephant Man, De Laurentiis' daughter Raffaella decided that David Lynch should direct the movie. Around that time Lynch received several other directing offers, including Return of the Jedi. He agreed to direct Dune and write the screenplay even though he had not read the book, was not familiar with the story, or even been interested in science fiction. Lynch worked on the script for six months with Eric Bergren and Christopher De Vore. The team yielded two drafts of the script before it split over creative differences. Lynch would subsequently work on five more drafts. Production of the work was troubled by problems at the Mexican studio and hampering the film's timeline. Lynch ended up producing a nearly three-hour-long film, but at demands from Universal Pictures, the film's distributor, he cut it back to about two hours, hastily filming additional scenes to make up for some of the cut footage.

This first film of Dune, directed by Lynch, was released in 1984, nearly 20 years after the book's publication. Though Herbert said the book's depth and symbolism seemed to intimidate many filmmakers, he was pleased with the film, saying that "They've got it. It begins as Dune does. And I hear my dialogue all the way through. There are some interpretations and liberties, but you're gonna come out knowing you've seen Dune." Reviews of the film were negative, saying that it was incomprehensible to those unfamiliar with the book, and that fans would be disappointed by the way it strayed from the book's plot. Upon release for television and other forms of home media, Universal opted to reintroduce much of the footage that Lynch had cut, creating an over-three-hour-long version with extensive monologue exposition. Lynch was extremely displeased with this move, and demanded that Universal replace his name on these cuts with the pseudonym "Alan Smithee", and has generally distanced himself from the film since.

=== 2000 miniseries by John Harrison ===
In 2000, John Harrison adapted the novel into Frank Herbert's Dune, a miniseries that premiered on the Sci-Fi Channel. As of 2004, the miniseries was one of the three highest-rated programs broadcast on the Sci-Fi Channel.

=== Further film attempts ===
In 2008, Paramount Pictures announced that they would produce a new film based on the book, with Peter Berg attached to direct. Producer Kevin Misher, who spent a year securing the rights from the Herbert estate, was to be joined by Richard Rubinstein and John Harrison (of both Sci-Fi Channel miniseries) as well as Sarah Aubrey and Mike Messina. The producers stated that they were going for a "faithful adaptation" of the novel and considered "its theme of finite ecological resources particularly timely". Science fiction author Kevin J. Anderson and Frank Herbert's son Brian Herbert, who had together written multiple Dune sequels and prequels since 1999, were attached to the project as technical advisors. In October 2009, Berg dropped out of the project, later saying that it "for a variety of reasons wasn't the right thing" for him. Subsequently, with a script draft by Joshua Zetumer, Paramount reportedly sought a new director who could do the film for under $175 million. In 2010, Pierre Morel was signed on to direct, with screenwriter Chase Palmer incorporating Morel's vision of the project into Zetumer's original draft. By November 2010, Morel left the project. Paramount finally dropped plans for a remake in March 2011.

=== Films by Denis Villeneuve ===
==== Dune (2021) ====
In November 2016, Legendary Entertainment acquired the film and TV rights for Dune. Variety reported in December 2016 that Denis Villeneuve was in negotiations to direct the project, which was confirmed in February 2017. In April 2017, Legendary announced that Eric Roth would write the screenplay. Villeneuve explained in March 2018 that his adaptation will be split into two films, with the first installment scheduled to begin production in 2019. Casting includes Timothée Chalamet as Paul Atreides, Dave Bautista as Rabban, Stellan Skarsgård as Baron Harkonnen, Rebecca Ferguson as Lady Jessica, Charlotte Rampling as Reverend Mother Mohiam, Oscar Isaac as Duke Leto Atreides, Zendaya as Chani, Javier Bardem as Stilgar, Josh Brolin as Gurney Halleck, Jason Momoa as Duncan Idaho, David Dastmalchian as Piter De Vries, Chang Chen as Dr. Yueh, and Stephen Henderson as Thufir Hawat. Warner Bros. Pictures distributed the film, which had its initial premiere on September 3, 2021, at the Venice Film Festival, and wide release in both theaters and streaming on HBO Max on October 21, 2021, as part of Warner Bros.' approach to handling the impact of the COVID-19 pandemic on the film industry. The film received "generally favorable reviews" on Metacritic. It has gone on to win multiple awards and was named by the National Board of Review as one of the 10 best films of 2021, as well as the American Film Institute in their annual top 10 list. The film went on to be nominated for ten Academy Awards, winning six, the most wins of the night for any film in contention.

==== Dune: Part Two (2024) ====
A sequel, Dune: Part Two, was scheduled for release on November 3, 2023, but was released on March 1, 2024, due to the 2023 SAG-AFTRA strike. It had its world premiere at the Odeon Luxe Leicester Square, London, on February 15, 2024, and opened in the United States on March 1. It received critical acclaim especially for its visual effects and has grossed over $715 million worldwide, making it the seventh-highest-grossing film of 2024.

==== Dune: Part Three (2026) ====
Dune: Part Three, scheduled for release on December 18, 2026 (United States), is Villeneuve's third and final Dune film, based on the 1969 novel Dune Messiah by Frank Herbert.

=== Audiobooks ===
In 1993, Recorded Books released a 20-disc audiobook narrated by George Guidall. In 2007, Macmillan Audio released a full-cast production featuring Scott Brick, Simon Vance, Orlagh Cassidy, Katherine Kellgren, Euan Morton (as Paul Atreides), and others, with sound effects and musical scoring. The production won the Audie Award for Science Fiction in 2008 and received the AudioFile Earphones Award; it was also a finalist in the Audie Award categories for Multi-Voiced Performance and Achievement in Production. As of March 2026, nearly nineteen years after its release, the audiobook ranked #3 on the Audible Best Sellers chart for Space Opera Science Fiction.

== Cultural influence ==
Dune has been widely influential, inspiring numerous novels, music, films, television, games, and comic books. It is considered one of the most influential science fiction novels of all time, with numerous modern science fiction works owing their existence to Dune. Dune has been referenced in numerous works of popular culture, including Star Wars, Star Trek, Chronicles of Riddick, The Kingkiller Chronicle and Futurama. Dune was cited as a source of inspiration for Hayao Miyazaki's manga Nausicaä of the Valley of the Wind (1982–1994) and its anime film adaptation (1984) for its post-apocalyptic world.

Dune was parodied in 1984's National Lampoon's Doon by Ellis Weiner, which William F. Touponce called "something of a tribute to Herbert's success on college campuses", noting that "the only other book to have been so honored is Tolkien's The Lord of the Rings," which was parodied by The Harvard Lampoon in 1969.

=== Music ===
- In 1977, David Matthews became one of the first artists to dedicate an entire composition to Dune, publishing an album of the same name on CTI Records. Matthews and CTI faced legal challenges from Herbert due to the unauthorized usage of Dune as the album's theme, which resulted in the album being removed from CTI's catalog.
- In 1978, French electronic musician Richard Pinhas released the nine-track Dune-inspired album Chronolyse, which includes the seven-part Variations sur le thème des Bene Gesserit.
- In 1979, German electronic music pioneer Klaus Schulze released an LP titled Dune featuring motifs and lyrics inspired by the novel.
- A similar musical project, Visions of Dune, was released also in 1979 by Zed (a pseudonym of French electronic musician Bernard Sjazner).
- 1981 French zeuhl band Dün released their album Eros which was inspired by the Dune novel, also their band name Dün was a short form from their temporary name Dune.
- Heavy metal band Iron Maiden wrote the song "To Tame a Land" based on the Dune story. It appears as the closing track to their 1983 album Piece of Mind. The original working title of the song was "Dune"; however, the band was denied permission to use it, with Frank Herbert's agents stating "Frank Herbert doesn't like rock bands, particularly heavy rock bands, and especially bands like Iron Maiden".
- Dune inspired the German happy hardcore band Dune, who have released several albums with space travel-themed songs.
- The progressive hardcore band Shai Hulud took their name from Dune.
- In 1988, New Zealand rock band Shihad chose their name based on "Jihad", the holy war scene from David Lynch's 1984 film.
- "Traveller in Time", from the 1991 Blind Guardian album Tales from the Twilight World, is based mostly on Paul Atreides' visions of future and past.
- The title of the 1993 Fear Factory album Fear is The Mindkiller is a quote from the "litany against fear".
- The song "Near Fantastica", from the Matthew Good album Avalanche, makes reference to the "litany against fear", repeating "can't feel fear, fear's the mind killer" through a section of the song.
- In the Fatboy Slim song "Weapon of Choice", the line "If you walk without rhythm/You won't attract the worm" is a near quotation from the sections of novel in which Stilgar teaches Paul to ride sandworms. Christopher Walken, who would later star in Dune: Part Two as Emperor Shaddam IV, appears in the music video.
- Dune also inspired the 1999 album The 2nd Moon by the German death metal band Golem, which is a concept album about the series.
- The song "The Eyes of Ibad" from Panchiko's 2000 EP D>E>A>T>H>M>E>T>A>L, takes its name from Dune, referencing the blue-in-blue eyes of the Fremen.
- Dune influenced Thirty Seconds to Mars on their self-titled debut album.
- The Youngblood Brass Band's song "Is an Elegy" on Center:Level:Roar references "Muad'Dib", "Arrakis" and other elements from the novel.
- The debut album of Canadian musician Grimes, called Geidi Primes, is a concept album based on Dune.
- In 2015, the Baltimore-based band Tendrills released a psych rock album called 10,191. The album's title, sound, emotionality, and some of its lyrics were inspired by the Dune novels.
- Japanese singer Kenshi Yonezu, released a song titled "Dune", also known as "Sand Planet". The song was released on 2017, and it was created using the voice synthesizer Hatsune Miku for her 10th anniversary.
- Sleep's 2018 album The Sciences features a song, Giza Butler, that references several aspects of Dune.
- Tool's 2019 album Fear Inoculum has a song entitled "Litanie contre la peur (Litany against fear)".
- "Rare to Wake", from Shannon Lay's album Geist (2019), is inspired by Dune.
- Heavy metal band Diamond Head based the song "The Sleeper" and its prelude, both off the album The Coffin Train, on the series.

=== Games ===
There have been a number of games based on the book, starting with the strategy–adventure game Dune (1992). The most important game adaptation is Dune II (1992), which established the conventions of modern real-time strategy games and is considered to be among the most influential video games of all time.

The online game Lost Souls includes Dune-derived elements, including sandworms and melange—addiction to which can produce psychic talents. The 2016 game Enter the Gungeon features the spice melange as a random item which gives the player progressively stronger abilities and penalties with repeated uses, mirroring the long-term effects melange has on users.

Rick Priestley cites Dune as a major influence on his 1987 wargame, Warhammer 40,000.

In 2023, Funcom announced Dune: Awakening, a massively multiplayer online game set in the universe of Dune.

=== Space exploration ===
The Apollo 15 astronauts named a small crater on Earth's Moon after the novel during the 1971 mission, and the name was formally adopted by the International Astronomical Union in 1973. Since 2009, the names of planets from the Dune novels have been adopted for the real-world nomenclature of plains and other features on Saturn's moon Titan, like Arrakis Planitia.

== See also ==
- Soft science fiction – Sub-genre of science fiction emphasizing "soft" sciences or human emotions
- Hydraulic empire – Government by control of access to water
- Genetics in fiction – Genetics as a theme in fiction
- Space travel in science fiction – Fictional methods, e.g. antigravity, hyperdrive
- Religious order – Groups based on religious devotion

== Bibliography ==
- Huddleston, Tom (2023). The Worlds of Dune: The Places and Cultures That Inspired Frank Herbert. Minneapolis, MN: Quarto Publishing Group UK.
