= Søren Brostrøm =

Director General of the Danish Health Authority

Søren Brostrøm R.

Director General of the Danish Health Authority
- In office 8 October 2015 – 1 August 2023
- Deputy: Helene Bilsted Probst
- Preceded by: Else Smith (Note: Jakob Cold served as interim Director General.)
- Succeeded by: Jonas Egebart

Member of the Executive Board of the World Health Organization
- Incumbent
- Assumed office 28 May 2021

Chairperson of the Standing Committee of the European Regional Committee of the WHO
- In office September 2019 (Note: Brostrøm was a member of the SCRC from 2017 and vice-chair from 2018.) – September 2020

Deputy Executive President of the WHO Regional Committee for Europe
- In office September 2019 – September 2020
- Preceded by: Ioannis Baskozos

Personal details
- Born: 4 June 1965 (age 61) Aarhus, Denmark
- Education: University of Copenhagen; Copenhagen Business School
- Scientific career
- Fields: Obstetrics & Gynecology, Urogynecology
- Workplaces: Danish Health Authority, Herlev Hospital, Rigshospitalet Glostrup, University of Copenhagen Faculty of Health and Medical Sciences

Søren Brostrøm (born 4 June 1965) is a Danish physician-scientist specializing in obstetrics and gynaecology. He was the Director general of the Danish Health Authority between 2015 and 2023, and has been a senior adviser to the Director-General of the WHO in charge of organizational change, since 2023.

Brostrøm has previously been a member (from 2017), Vice-chair (from 2018), and Chair (from 2019), of the Standing Committee of the European Regional Committee (SCRC), as well as (ex officio) Deputy Executive president of the WHO Regional Committee for Europe (69th session; 2019–2020). He held these posts during the COVID-19 pandemic, and as chairperson he led the committee's crisis management and response.

Before becoming director general in 2015, Brostrøm served, from September 2011, as the Director of the Department of Hospitals and Emergency management, also at the Danish Health Authority. Brostrøm worked as a chief physician at Herlev Hospital and as an associate professor at the University of Copenhagen, before joining the Danish Health Authority.

Following the COVID-19 pandemic, Brostrøm became a prominent public figure in Denmark, where he played a key role in the Danish response to COVID-19, which has been described as "one of the most successful in Europe." In Denmark, he became widely known as the "corona general", and was especially praised for his "directness and clarity with which he speaks" and his reliance on facts and logic.

== Early life and education ==
Søren Brostrøm was born in Aarhus in 1965, the second son of two medical doctors; his mother a paediatrician and his father a cancer researcher. He grew up in Risskov and Farsø. His father died in an accident when Brostrøm was 11 years old, and the family moved to Mobile, Alabama, where Brostrøm experienced different social conditions. Brostrom said in a 2020-interview that "the tragedy has left an everlasting mark on me" and that life after his father's death was burdened by "both grief and a tough financial situation".

In the early 1980s, Søren Brostrøm was the international secretary of the Danish Communist Youth League. Brostrøm graduated from Gammel Hellerup Gymnasium in 1984.

From an early age, he was interested in biology and mathematics. Brostrøm has said in connection with his profession and education that "although my parents were doctors, it was my own choice, but I was probably also very influenced by them."

In 1995, Brostrøm received a Master of Science in Medicine (cand. med.) degree from the University of Copenhagen. He completed his clinical clerkship at Holstebro Hospital in Holstebro, Denmark. In 2003, he obtained his PhD degree in obstetrics and gynaecology, with a subspecialization in urogynecology, focused on laparoscopic pelvic surgery. He completed a Master of Public Administration from the Copenhagen Business School in 2011. In 2019, he completed a Senior Managers in Government (SMG) program at Harvard Kennedy School of Government.

His PhD thesis was on motor evoked potentials from the pelvic floor and lower urinary tract dysfunction.

== Career ==
He made a career in several Copenhagen hospitals as a gynaecological surgeon and was one of the leading doctors in Europe in performing a special robotic-assisted operation in which the top of the vagina is stitched open.

After his medical training, Brostrøm worked in 2007 as an attending physician at the gynaecological-obstetric department at Aarhus University Hospital Skejby. He then worked as a chief physician at the gynaecological-obstetric department at Glostrup Hospital from 2007 to 2008. From 2009 to 2011 he worked as a chief physician at the gynaecological-obstetric department at Herlev University Hospital.

For two years from 2009 to 2011, Brostrøm worked concurrently as an associate professor at the Department of Gynaecology and Obstetrics (now part of the Department of Clinical Medicine) at the Faculty of Health and Medical Sciences at the University of Copenhagen, and completed a Master of Public Administration (MPA) at Copenhagen Business School.

=== Danish Health Authority ===
In September 2011, Brostrøm joined the Danish Health Authority as the Director of the Department of Hospitals and Emergency management, with broad responsibilities for the national planning of specialized hospital services, emergency services and preparedness, communicable diseases, immunization and screening programs as well as national action plans in the field of cancer, cardiovascular diseases, mental health etc.

The responsibilities also included health preparedness and infectious diseases, which is where the Authority's pandemic preparedness lies. During the COVID-19 pandemic ten years later, Brostrøm would come to rely on the experience and knowledge he gained as department head.

=== Director-General ===
In October 2015, Brostrøm was appointed Director general of the Danish Health Authority, which was immediately afterwards heavily reshaped by a comprehensive organizational change, where major areas such as patient safety, approval of medicines and handling of health data were placed in independent authorities. The Danish Health Authority remained the overall authority.

One of his first major tasks was to complete the update of the specialty plan, which dictates which hospitals can perform complicated treatments and which cannot. It came into force in June 2017 after extensive committee work and many critical debates in medical circles.

In May 2021, Brostrøm was elected a member of the Executive Board of the World Health Organization by the World Health Assembly.

==== Public attention ====
Brostrøm came to public attention when the Danish Health Authority's HPV vaccination programme in 2014–15 experienced a sudden and large drop in uptake among the target group, girls and young women, who feared serious side effects. Brostrøm took responsibility for inadequate communication and did so in an open and personal manner, which has also been characteristic of his appearance at numerous press conferences and interviews in connection with the handling of the COVID-19 pandemic.

== Personal life and interests ==
Brostrøm is interested in art, theatre and the opera. Brostrøm is openly homosexual.

=== HIV/AIDS impact on Brostrøm ===
Brostrom spoke in an interview in 2020 about how the HIV and AIDS global epidemic affected his youth: "HIV and AIDS is the disease I myself grew up with. Both as a young gay man and as a young medical student." Brostrøm described how the disease came as a shock and put a damper on the free and uninhibited sexuality that had taken hold in the gay community throughout the 1960s and 70s. Brostrøm said, "In 1992 I was in the US as part of (medical) school, and from that period I remember it very clearly. There was a lot of debate and the disease was shrouded in taboo. There were religious and conservative groups who called HIV and AIDS God's punishment on homosexuals. At that time I saw young beautiful men lying dead. People like myself."

== Memberships, chairmanships and organizational work ==
Brostrøm has been chairman and board member of a number of organizations. List:

=== Danish ===
- Member of the Board of the Danish Society of Obstetrics and Gynaecology.
- 2001–2003: President of the Danish Association of Young Gynaecologists and Obstetricians (FYGO).
- 2008–2011: President of the Danish FIGO-foundation.
- 2018–2022: Member of the Board of the Danish Health Fund.

==== Governmental ====
- 2014–present: Chair of the National Task force on Cancer and Heart Disease.
- 2014–present: Chair of the National Task force on Mental health.
- 2015–present: Advisory role to Cabinet and Parliament.
- 2015–present: Executive officer in the Ministry of Health.

=== International ===
- 2001–2002: Member of the Executive Committee of the European Network of Trainees in Obstetrics and Gynaecology (ENTOG)
- 2003–2005: President of the European Network of Trainees in Obstetrics and Gynaecology (ENTOG).
- 2003–2006: board member of the European Board and College of Obstetrics and Gynaecology (EBCOG).
- 2008–2011: Member of the Scientific Committee of the International Urogynaecology Association (IUGA).
- 2008–2011: President of the Nordic Urogynaecology Association (NUGA).
- 2010–2012: Secretary general of the International Urogynecological Association (IUGA).
- 2012–2015: Member of the Health Security Committee (HSC) of the European Union

==== World Health Organization ====
- 2017–2018: Member of the Standing Committee of the European Regional Committee (SCRC) of the WHO.
- 2018: Vice-chair of the WHO World Health Assembly Committee A
- 2018–2019: Vice-chair of the Standing Committee of the European Regional Committee (SCRC) of the WHO.
- 2019–2020: Chair of the Standing Committee of the European Regional Committee (SCRC) of the WHO.
- 2019–2020: Deputy Executive president of the WHO Regional Committee for Europe.
- 2021–2024: Member of the Executive Board of the World Health Organization.

== Awards and honours ==
=== National ===
- Denmark:
  - Knight of the Order of the Dannebrog (2018)

== Selected works and publications ==
=== Journals ===
- Brostrøm, Søren (2003). "Motor Evoked Potentials from the Pelvic Floor". Neurourology and Urodynamics. 22 (7): 620–637. doi:10.1002/nau.10151. PMID 14595605. S2CID 9427779. Wikidata ()
- Brostrøm, Søren; Jennum, Poul; Lose, Gunnar (2003). "Motor evoked potentials from the striated urethral sphincter: A comparison of concentric needle and surface electrodes". Neurourology and Urodynamics. 22 (2): 123–129. doi:10.1002/nau.10030. ISSN 0733-2467. PMID 12579629. S2CID 19880017. Wikidata ()
- Brostrøm, Søren; Jennum, Poul; Lose, Gunnar (2003). "Motor evoked potentials from the striated urethral sphincter and puborectal muscle: Normative values". Neurourology and Urodynamics. 22 (4): 306–313. doi:10.1002/nau.10077. ISSN 1520-6777. PMID 12808705. S2CID 2471980. Wikidata ()
- Brostrøm, Søren; Jennum, Poul; Lose, Gunnar (2003). "Motor evoked potentials from the striated urethral sphincter and puborectal muscle: reproducibility of latencies". Clinical Neurophysiology. 114 (10): 1891–1895. doi:10.1016/S1388-2457(03)00199-8. ISSN 1388-2457. PMID 14499750. S2CID 24909746. Wikidata ()
- Brostrøm, Søren; Frederiksen, J. L.; Jennum, P.; Lose, G. (2003). "Motor evoked potentials from the pelvic floor in patients with multiple sclerosis". Journal of Neurology, Neurosurgery, and Psychiatry. 74 (4): 498–500. doi:10.1136/jnnp.74.4.498. ISSN 0022-3050. PMC 1738390. PMID 12640072. Wikidata ()
- Brostrøm, Søren (2005). "European trainees cooperate to harmonise and improve the quality of training in OB/GYN". European Clinics in Obstetrics and Gynaecology. 1 (1): 57–58. doi:10.1007/s11296-004-0001-2. ISSN 1613-3412. S2CID 68229375. Wikidata ()
- Brostrøm, Søren; Lose, Gunnar (2008). "Pelvic floor muscle training in the prevention and treatment of urinary incontinence in women – what is the evidence?". Acta Obstetricia et Gynecologica Scandinavica. 87 (4): 384–402. doi:10.1080/00016340801938806. ISSN 1600-0412. PMID 18382863. Wikidata ()
- Brostrøm, Søren (2008–2010). "Which nonsurgical options are effective for the treatment of female urinary incontinence?". Nature Clinical Practice Urology. 5 (10): 532–533. doi:10.1038/ncpuro1197. ISSN 1743-4289. PMID 18728631. S2CID 42368096. Wikidata ()
- Brostrøm, Søren (2019). "Improving care for patients with functional disorders in Denmark". Journal of Psychosomatic Research. 116: 22–24. doi:10.1016/j.jpsychores.2018.11.003. ISSN 0022-3999. PMID 30654989. S2CID 58551967. Wikidata ()
- Guldberg, Rikke; Brostrøm, Søren; Hansen, Jesper Kjær; Kærlev, Linda; Gradel, Kim Oren; Nørgård, Bente Mertz; Kesmodel, Ulrik Schiøler (2013). "The Danish Urogynaecological Database: establishment, completeness and validity". International Urogynecology Journal. 24 (6): 983–990. doi:10.1007/s00192-012-1968-8. ISSN 1433-3023. PMID 23073539. S2CID 434294. Wikidata ()
- Guldberg, Rikke; Kesmodel, Ulrik Schiøler; Brostrøm, Søren; Kærlev, Linda; Hansen, Jesper Kjær; Hallas, Jesper; Nørgård, Bente Mertz (2014). "Use of antibiotics for urinary tract infection in women undergoing surgery for urinary incontinence: a cohort study". BMJ Open. 4 (2) e004051. doi:10.1136/bmjopen-2013-004051. ISSN 2044-6055. PMC 3918979. PMID 24496697. Wikidata ()
- Due, Ulla; Brostrøm, Søren; Lose, Gunnar (1 April 2016). "Lifestyle advice with or without pelvic floor muscle training for pelvic organ prolapse: a randomized controlled trial". International Urogynecology Journal. 27 (4): 555–563. doi:10.1007/s00192-015-2852-0. ISSN 1433-3023. PMID 26439114. S2CID 20986824. Wikidata ()
- Due, Ulla; Brostrøm, Søren; Lose, Gunnar (2016). "The 12-month effects of structured lifestyle advice and pelvic floor muscle training for pelvic organ prolapse". Acta Obstetricia et Gynecologica Scandinavica. 95 (7): 811–819. doi:10.1111/aogs.12884. ISSN 1600-0412. PMID 26910261. Wikidata ()

=== Books ===
- Subjektivt & objektivt: anamnese, undersøgelse og journal [Subjective & objective: anamnesis, examination and journal]. Søren Brostrøm, Niels, f. Saxtrup, Lotte Clevin (3 ed.). Copengagen: Munksgaard Danmark. 2011. ISBN 978-87-628-1012-9. OCLC 769811356.
