= Scandinavia (disambiguation) =

Scandinavia generally refers to the region consisting of Denmark, Norway, and Sweden.

Scandinavia may also refer to:

== Places ==
- Scandinavian Peninsula, a peninsula in Northern Europe
- Scandinavia Township, Harlan County, Nebraska, U.S.
- Scandinavia, Wisconsin, U.S., a village
- Scandinavia (town), Wisconsin, adjacent to the village
- Scandinavia, Manitoba, Canada

== Music ==
- Scandinavia (album), by Michael Learns to Rock, 2012
- "Scandinavia" (composition), by Van Morrison, 1982
- "Scandinavia", a song by Morrissey from World Peace Is None of Your Business, 2014

== Ships ==
- MS Scandinavia, several ships
- USS Scandinavia (SP-3363), a US Navy patrol vessel 1918–1919, later the US Coast and Geodetic Survey ship USC&GS Scandinavia

== Other ==
- Scandinavia (horse), Thoroughbred racehorse

== See also ==
- Nordic countries, the broader region that includes Scandinavia
- Pan-Scandinavia
- Scandinavian (disambiguation)
- Scandinavica (disambiguation)
