= MS Stena Scandinavica =

MS Stena Scandinavica may refer to:

- MS Stena Scandinavica (1972) (built 1973) – Broken up in 2007
- MS Stena Scandinavica (built 1974) – Broken up in 2022
- MS Stena Scandinavica (1983) (built 1983) – Now Stena Spirit with Stena Line
- MS Stena Scandinavica (2003) (built 2003) – Current Stena Scandinavica
