= COVID-19 pandemic in Denmark =

Aspect of viral disease pandemic

- Nationwide distribution of confirmed cases by municipality on 17 March 2020
- Disease: COVID-19
- Pathogen: SARS-CoV-2
- Location: Denmark
- First outbreak: Wuhan, Hubei, China (globally), Wuhan, China (origin of first Danish case), Tyrol, Austria (origin of most imported cases)
- Index case: Roskilde
- Arrival date: 27 February 2020 (6 years, 8 months, 3 weeks and 3 days)
- Confirmed cases: 2,519,057 (20 February 2022)
- Active cases: 117,815 (21 December 2021)
- Recovered: 519,497 (21 December 2021)
- Deaths: 4,250 (20 February 2022)
- Fatality rate: 0.2% (20 February 2022)

Government website
- www.sst.dk/da/corona/tal-og-overvaagning; www.ssi.dk/sygdomme-beredskab-og-forskning/sygdomsovervaagning/c/covid19-overvaagning

On 31 December 2019, China announced the discovery of a cluster of pneumonia cases in Wuhan. The first Danish case was reported on 27 February, and prime minister Mette Frederiksen announced lockdown measures on 11 March effective from 13 March. Following a period of consistent increases in hospitalisations, the number of people in hospital with COVID-19 fell from March onwards, with the number of cases in need of intensive care and ventilator units, also peaking in late March. Starting on 15 April, a very slow and gradual reopening was initiated.

In an attempt to reduce the economic impact of the COVID-19 pandemic, the Frederiksen Cabinet introduced large economic packages with the support of all parties in the Folketing. The Danish GDP fell by 2.7% in 2020, less than in many other countries.

== Background ==
On 12 January 2020, the World Health Organization (WHO) confirmed that a novel coronavirus was the cause of a respiratory illness in a cluster of people in Wuhan, Hubei, China, which was reported to the WHO on 31 December 2019. The case fatality ratio for COVID-19 has been much lower than SARS of 2003, but the transmission has been significantly greater, with a significant total death toll.

== Timeline ==
=== February 2020 ===
From late January to early February, several groups of Danish citizens were evacuated from China. All were placed in quarantine and tested; none were infected.

At the very end of February, three men tested positive for the virus. On 27 February 2020, Denmark confirmed its first case, a man from Roskilde who had been skiing in Lombardy, Italy and returned to Denmark on 24 February. The next day, a man in Copenhagen tested positive. He had been skiing in Italy two weeks earlier, and the relatively long time period made it difficult to determine whether the virus had spread from him to others in that time. On 29 February, a man in Aarhus tested positive; he was believed to have been infected at a medical conference in Germany.

=== March 2020 ===
On 1 March, a person who was already in home quarantine was tested positive. The person had been in contact with the man tested positive on 28 February.

3 March

On 3 March, five people that had visited northern Italy and one person that had visited Iran were tested positive for COVID-19. All six were placed in home quarantine.

4 March

On 4 March, there were four more cases confirmed in Denmark and the first confirmed case was reported from the Faroe Islands (an autonomous territory in the Kingdom of Denmark), bringing the total number of confirmed cases to fifteen. All the new cases were placed in home quarantine. The case in the Faroe Islands was a man with mild symptoms that had returned home from a conference in Paris, France.

5 March

On 5 March, there were five new confirmed cases. One of the cases was former Danish national football player Thomas Kahlenberg, who had been infected at a birthday party in Amsterdam, the Netherlands. This forced the Danish clubs Brøndby and Lyngby, and the Dutch club Ajax to place some of their players and coaches, who had recently met with Kahlenberg, into quarantine. Kahlenberg described his symptoms as similar to a flu, and he was placed in home quarantine. On the same date, the first Dane that had been confirmed infected on 27 February also became the first Dane to be declared fully recovered.

6 March

On 6 March, there were three new confirmed cases, including one in the Faroe Islands (the second case for this archipelago).

7 March

On 7 March, there were six new confirmed cases. Most Danes confirmed to be infected with SARS-CoV-2 had contracted it abroad, and they had infected a few people in Denmark (there had been no person-to-person spread within Denmark where the source was unknown).

8 March

On 8 March, there were eight new confirmed cases, including a patient first admitted to North Zealand Hospital Hillerød with symptoms resembling pneumonia. Another mild case where the patient was placed in home quarantine was the first person confirmed to have COVID-19 in the North Jutland Region, meaning that all five regions of Denmark now had cases.

9 March

On 9 March, there were 53 new confirmed cases, bringing the total in Denmark to 90. Among all those infected, six were in hospital, but none of them required intensive care.

10 March

On 10 March, there were 172 new cases, bringing the total in Denmark to 262. Among the new cases was one patient admitted to hospital, bringing the total to seven.

11 March

On 11 March, there were 252 new cases, bringing the total in Denmark to 514. One of the cases, who likely had become infected at a meeting where another attendee was infected, caused particular concern because the person worked in a nursing home. As a result, the elderly at the nursing home were isolated in their own rooms, they were closely monitored, and tests were being performed. Among all the infected people in Denmark, ten patients were in hospital, including two in intensive care.

Prime Minister Mette Frederiksen announced major restrictions on this day, asking Danes to act with a sense of collective responsibility and community spirit in the face of coming hardships.

12 March

On 12 March, there were 160 new confirmed cases, bringing the total in Denmark to 674. Among these were two at the nursing home where the elderly had been isolated and closely monitored since the day before because an employee was tested positive. On the same date, former footballer Thomas Kahlenberg announced that he had been declared fully recovered, making him the second publicly known recovery in the country. Whereas many early cases were related to people returning from ski holiday in northern Italy, many cases discovered later were related to people returning from ski holiday in Tyrol in Austria. An 80-year-old man with a history of heart disease tested positive after having a heart attack and dying in the North Jutland Region. Although unclear whether the virus had played a role in it, the authorities counted it as the first fatality related to COVID-19 in Denmark.

13 March

On 13 March, there were 127 new confirmed cases, bringing the total in Denmark to 801. In addition, the Faroe Islands had their third confirmed case. Among all the infected people in Denmark, 23 were in hospital, including 4 in intensive care.

14 March

On 14 March, there were 26 new confirmed cases in Denmark, bringing the total to 827. Another 6 were confirmed in the Faroe Islands, bringing the total to 9 in this archipelago. The second person died from COVID-19 in Denmark, in the Capital Region. It was an 81-year-old that was already weakened due to other serious diseases.

=== April 2020 ===
6 April

On 6 April, Prime Minister Mette Frederiksen announced what she called the "first phase" of the reopening of Denmark: she announced that nurseries and kindergartens would be opened again on 15 April and that folkeskole would be reopened for pupils in years 1–6 (Danish: 0.-5. klasse); furthermore, the final exams for pupils in year 10 (Danish: 9. klasse), the last year of the folkeskole, were cancelled. Restaurants, cafés and hairdressers were to remain closed until 10 May, and larger gatherings will be prohibited until September.

10 April

The Danish Health Authority changed its guideline to say that asymptomatic people can transmit the disease, from saying that the risk was "unconfirmed" or "very small" to "significant". As documented by the Danish newspaper Berlingske, there has long been consensus among experts that this was indeed the case (and it had long been widely reported common knowledge), and the health authority was unable or unwilling to defend their previous claim. It had previously been strongly criticized that workers in a retirement home were asked to continue working after having had contact with sick persons, again against all expert advice, and apparently because of Danish Health Authority guidelines.

=== May–October ===
On 12 May, Prime Minister Mette Frederiksen announced a new offensive testing strategy, which aims to "strengthen the contact tracing". The national testing strategy is based on three essential elements: testing, tracing and isolation. The new testing strategy takes a more aggressive approach with broader testing of both symptomatic and asymptomatic individuals. The new testing strategy also charge the local municipalities with providing holiday centres, hotels or the like, as a voluntary offer of self-isolation.

As a part of new offensive testing strategy, the Prime Minister presented a new government agency. The agency will be organised under the Ministry of Justice. The Ministry of Justice said that experience in dealing with COVID-19 in Denmark shows that there is a need for a consistent and transverse coordination and support of government efforts, for example to ensure the supply of socially critical infrastructure. The implementation of the new offensive test strategy, the detection of infection and better possibilities for self-isolation require a massive support from, among other things, the use of the test-system, security of supply and practical operation. At the same time, there is a need for health authorities in such a situation to focus on the core tasks of health care. In order to strengthen more permanently the overall regulatory effort, this new government agency was established. The agency is expected to be fully operational in August 2020.

Masks/face shields become mandatory in public transport in August, with the mandate being extended to most public places in October.

=== November 2020 and onwards ===
A major producer of mink pelts, the government ordered all the country's mink nationwide to be slaughtered over fears of viral mutations, following an outbreak of a mutated SARS-CoV-2 virus referred to as Cluster 5.[481] While the State Serum Institute (SSI, Statens Serum Institut) suggested that this mutation was no more dangerous than other coronaviruses, SSI head Kåre Mølbak warned that the mutation could impact the development and effectiveness of COVID-19 vaccines. On 5 November, it was announced that a new lockdown and movement restrictions would be implemented in seven municipalities of Northern Jutland beginning 6 November.

Danish Health Authority announced on 14 April 2021 the removal of the Oxford AstraZeneca COVID-19 vaccine from the Danish vaccination program due to concerns of serious side effects. On 29 June, health minister Magnus Heunicke announced that the government had bought 1.17 million COVID-19 vaccines from Romania. An agreement to phase out the requirement of masks in public was also reasched in June, but was in November reinforced along with several other restrictions.

On the negotiations to reopen society in April 2021, Freja Brandhøj stated on behalf of Danmarks Restauranter & Caféer "We think it's a shame that we couldn't reach an agreement right away".

On 21 January 2022, Denmark had 1.3 million confirmed cases, reaching an all-time high of 20–40 thousand daily cases throughout most of January. In February, most restrictions were lifted, with authorities stating that the virus was no longer a "critical threat".

== Testing, treatment and preventive measures ==
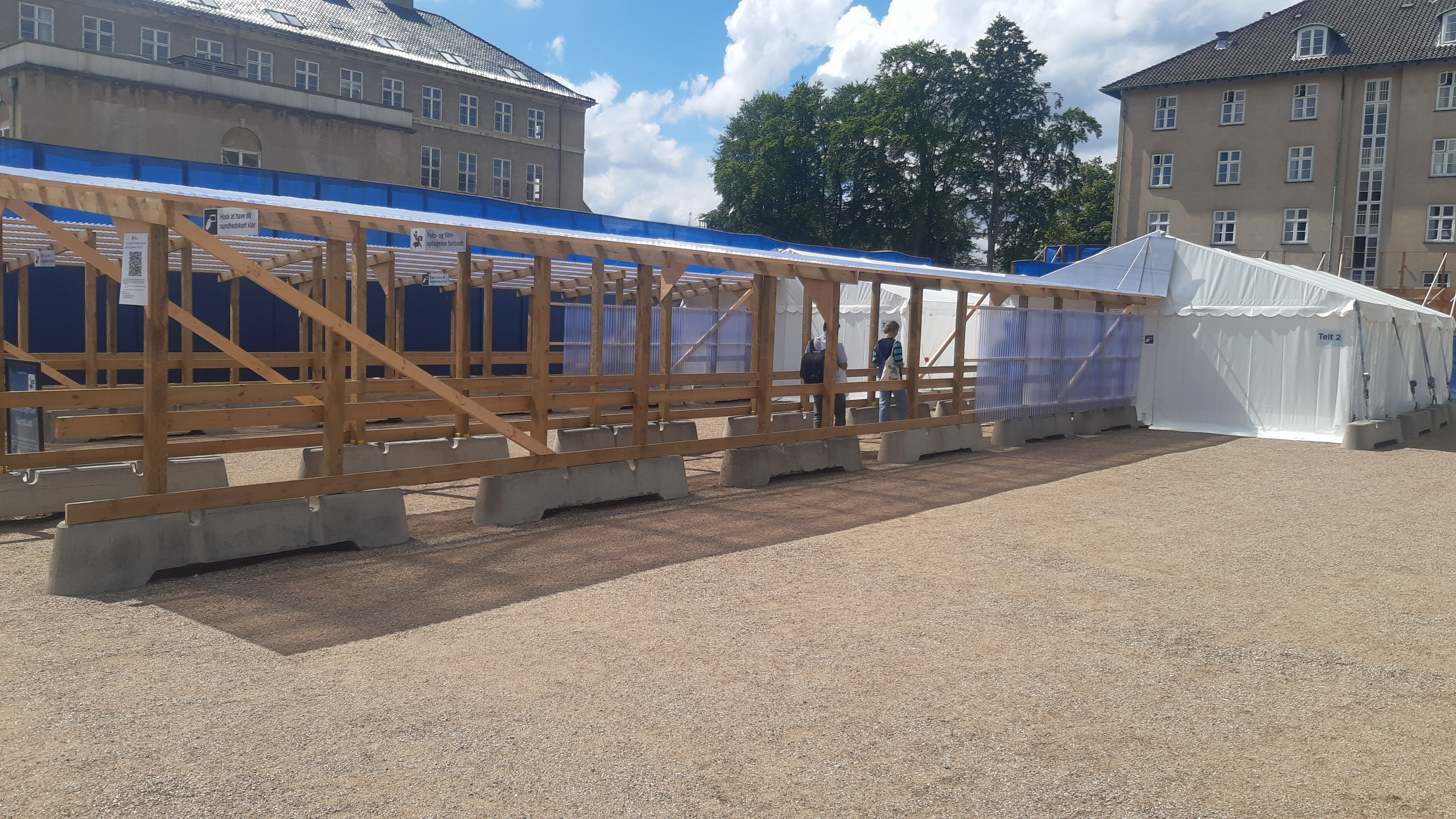
Testing tent outside Rigshospitalet, Copenhagen

In Denmark, (Note: The autonomous territories of the Faroe Islands and Greenland have their own, but associated hospital systems, that also have prepared for dealing with COVID-19) Aalborg University Hospital, Aarhus University Hospital, Hvidovre Hospital, Odense University Hospital, Rigshospitalet and Zealand University Hospital Roskilde have sections prepared for serious cases of COVID-19 that require treatment, as well as patients that are elderly or have pre-existing conditions and therefore are particularly vulnerable to the disease. Other hospitals were required by the regions to prepare lists of non-essential operations that can be postponed. This would allow the manpower, space and equipment to rapidly be allocated towards an outbreak of coronavirus. On 11 March 2020, the first hospitals began postponing non-essential operations as a preparation for future cases of COVID-19, and on 17 March this was done in all hospitals nationwide. Initially, all testing of samples for SARS-CoV-2 was performed at the SSI, but on 25 February (before the first confirmed case in the country) this was expanded to all the hospitals that also had sections that were ready for treating serious cases of COVID-19. In early March, other hospitals started to perform the tests. On 6 March, Aarhus University Hospital made a "drive-through" test facility (similar to those used in South Korea) where a person can be tested without having to leave his/her vehicle, but people using it still have to phone their personal doctor or the doctor-on-call (Danish: Lægevagten) for instructions first. On 10–11 March, Aalborg University Hospital, Regionshospital North Jutland Hjørring and Zealand University Hospital Roskilde introduced "drive-through" test facilities.

On 11 March, the Danish Health Authority announced a change of strategy, which means that only people hospitalised with severe signs of respiratory illness or shortness of breath, will be examined for COVID-19 infection. As a consequence, it is suspected that COVID-19 cases in the country are underreported, and health officials expect the actual number to be significantly higher than the current number of confirmed cases.

According to the guidelines by the Danish Health Authority, all infected people that have no or mild symptoms and are not considered particularly vulnerable are placed in home quarantine with daily contact from health professionals. Anybody that has been in close contact with someone known to be infected with SARS-CoV-2 is also placed in home quarantine. As of 2 March 122 people were in home quarantine in Denmark because they had been in contact with an infected person in Denmark or abroad; by 12 March this had increased to 1366 in Denmark and 31 in the Faroe Islands. It is expected to further increase as a result of new cases of COVID-19. Should it become necessary, each region has its own facilities for quarantining at least one thousand people, and if containment of SARS-CoV-2 through normal isolation fails, more drastic measures can be implemented using the Epidemic Law (Danish: epidemiloven).

Initially, the authorities strongly recommended that all events with more than one thousand people be cancelled or postponed, but on 11 March the limit was lowered to one hundred people; this recommendation covers March, but can be extended if necessary. Among others, football (including the Danish Superliga) and handball matches were without spectators or entirely cancelled, the Dansk Melodi Grand Prix did not have an audience, concerts and conferences were cancelled or postponed, and the Euroschoolsport tournament at Esbjerg High School, where students and teachers from much of Europe were supposed to meet, was cancelled. The Folketing cancelled some of its regular meetings and hearings, and when voting a clearing system will be used to avoid having more than 95 members in the main chamber at any one time.

On 10 March, the authorities recommended that people using public transport attempt to reduce their travel in peak hours, additionally encouraged them to walk or cycle shorter distances instead if possible, and advised any persons feeling sick in any way or suspecting that they might have been infected against using public transport. In an attempt to increase the space between people using public transport, more buses and trains were added to the schedules, and there were stricter limits on the number of passengers allowed in each. From 12 March, all intercity train rides were restricted to people with seat reservations.

=== Lockdown ===
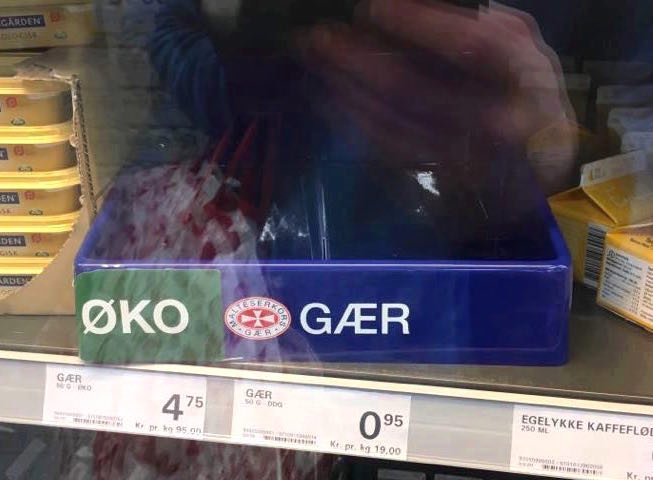
An empty yeast tray at a supermarket in Odense on 17 March 2020. Following the announcement of a general lockdown, large-scale panic buying of several everyday products occurred.

Starting on 13 March 2020, all people working in non-essential functions in the public sector were ordered to stay home for two weeks. These restrictions were announced with an acknowledgement that the circumstances would be difficult, and Prime Minister Mette Frederiksen urged Danes to practice samfundssind (roughly, community-mindedness). The first documented use of this Danish word was in the 1936, and the then-Prime Minister Thorvald Stauning used the term to call for solidarity at the outbreak of World War II in Europe.

In the private sector, employers were urged by the authorities to allow their employees to stay home in the same period and work from there if possible, although this should not affect functions that are essential to the society (such as pharmacy workers and people working with sale of food and maintenance of critical infrastructure).

On that same date, all secondary education (like gymnasiums), universities, libraries, indoor cultural institutions and similar places were closed, initially for two weeks. Starting on 16 March, all primary schools, daycare and similar places were also closed for two weeks. Virtual (online) schooling was used to some degree. The municipalities are establishing limited daycare for children where the parents could not stay home and take care of them. Because of the vulnerability of elderly to COVID-19, it was strongly recommended that grandparents should not take care of their grandchildren.

Starting on 18 March at 10:00 AM, a number of further restrictions were activated: it became illegal to assemble more than ten people in public, all shopping centres and stores with close contact such as hairdressers and nightclubs must be closed, restaurants can only serve take-away, and other businesses must ensure that there is enough space between customers.

Unlike previous restrictions on the number of people allowed to assemble, the new restrictions were not merely a recommendation, and breaking the new restrictions was associated with fines of DKK1500.

In late March, authorities acknowledged that the strategy of mitigation had partially worked, but had been less successful than the mass testing in China and South Korea. Efforts were increased for immediate testing (at Novo Nordisk), mass testing and local rapid testing for individuals.

=== International travel, quarantine after return and foreign visitors ===
The Danish Foreign Ministry has changed its travel guidelines several times during the COVID-19 pandemic. During the peak of the outbreak in mainland China, Iran, the regions of Aosta Valley, Emilia-Romagna, Lombardy, Marche, Piedmont and Veneto in Italy, Ischgl in Tyrol of Austria, and San Marino, all travel to these places was advised against, and during the peak in the rest of Italy, the rest of Tyrol in Austria, Madrid, Basque Country and La Rioja in Spain, parts of Germany, parts of France, parts of Switzerland, and Daegu City and North Gyeongsang Province (also known as Gyeongbuk) in South Korea, all non-essential travel to these places was advised against. On 13 March, all non-essential travel to the rest of the world was advised against because of the spread of the outbreak, restrictions introduced on foreign visitors (for example, restrictions of flights or forced quarantine), their healthcare system's ability to handle a major outbreak or other reasons indirectly related to the COVID-19 pandemic. On 13 March, the authorities recommended that all Danes that were abroad (excluding Danes that live abroad) return to Denmark as soon as possible. From 14 March to 13 April, all Danish borders were closed, with exceptions made solely for the transport of goods, people with an important reason for visiting, foreigners leaving Denmark, and Danes and people with a residence permit returning to Denmark.

On 3 March, the Danish government required all healthcare workers (in addition to nursing home workers) who had travelled to a high-risk region to self-quarantine themselves for 14 days after returning to Denmark; this was done to reduce the risk of vulnerable people getting infected. As of 9 March, the list of high-risk regions included mainland China, part of South Korea, Iran, Italy and the Austrian state of Tyrol. Other people who had visited these high-risk areas were advised against visiting hospitals or nursing homes for 14 days after returning to Denmark (and people who suspected that they had been infected were urged to call their personal doctor or the doctor-on-call (Danish: Lægevagten) for further instructions), and it was recommended—but not required—that they also stay home from work for 14 days. This recommendation was supported by the employers' organisations in the country, such as the Confederation of Danish Industry and the Danish Chamber of Commerce. Kommunernes Landsforening, which represents the municipalities in Denmark, made similar recommendations for all children that had visited a high-risk region; it recommended that they stay home from school, kindergarten, daycare and similar places for 14 days after returning to Denmark. Foreigners that arrive in Denmark from a high-risk region were urged—but not required—by the authorities to follow the same guidelines as Danes, and localities for quarantining were made available for people that did not already have a suitable locality.

Starting on 9 March, passengers on flights that originated in a high-risk region were not given access to Danish airport buildings, but instead were picked up directly from the plane and transported by special buses that could drive them to their home or other locality of quarantine. From 11 March onwards, all flights from high-risk regions were cancelled.

The postal service suspended international mail outside the European Union to all but 17 countries due to lack of transportation, and suspended gathering of signatures on delivery.

== Vaccination ==
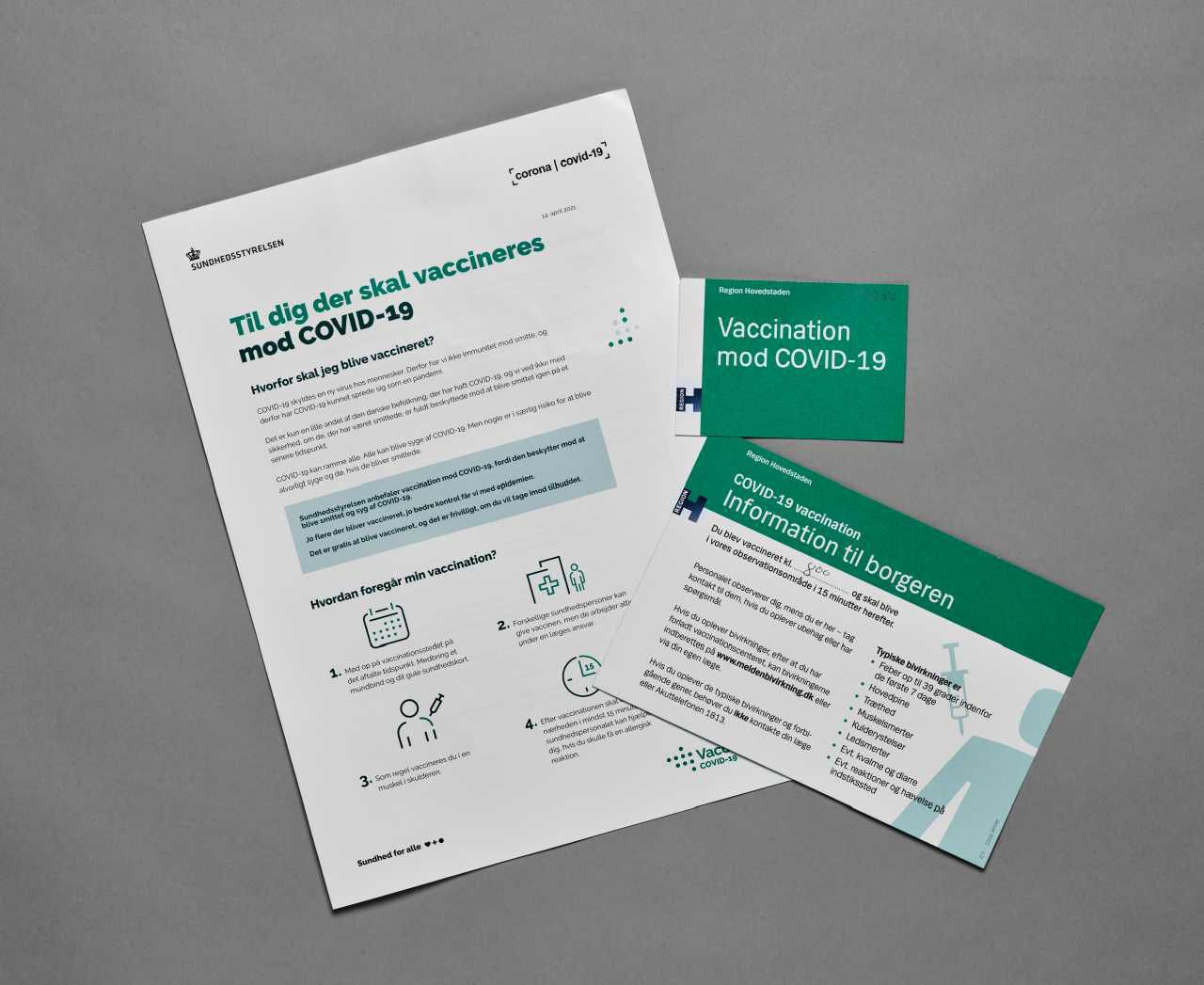
Danish guidance papers regarding COVID-19 vaccination

Denmark started vaccinating against COVID-19 on 27 December 2020. The vaccination was free of cost and voluntary. It was available to all residents of Denmark and those from abroad staying for more than 30 days in Denmark. By September 2021, Denmark had one of the highest levels of COVID-19 vaccination in the European Union. In April 2022, Denmark announced the suspension of its COVID-19 vaccination program, making it the first country in the world to do so. As of October 2022 the Danish Health Authorities recommend a booster vaccination to people aged 50 and over, as well as selected risk groups. They did so due to the expectation of an increasing number of COVID-19 infections during the autumn and winter months.

Because children and adolescents rarely become severely ill from the Omicron variant of COVID-19, the Danish Health Authority does not recommend vaccination. From 1 July 2022, it was no longer possible for children and adolescents aged under 18 to get the first injection and, from 1 September 2022, it was no longer possible for them to get the second injection. A very limited number of children at particularly higher risk of becoming severely ill may still be offered vaccination based on an individual assessment by a doctor.

Denmark used Pfizer/BioNTech and Moderna vaccines. Denmark was the first country in Europe to stop using Oxford-AstraZeneca as well as Janssen J&J vaccines by citing blood clots as side effects, despite the approval of these vaccines by the European Medicines Agency. In May 2021, it became possible for Danish citizens to opt-in to receive any of these vaccines, although these vaccines were not included in the Danish vaccination program.

=== Vaccines on order ===
Vaccine	Approval	Deployment
Pfizer–BioNTech	21 December 2020	27 December 2020
Moderna	6 January 2021	12 January 2021
Oxford-AstraZeneca	29 January 2021	7 February 2021
Janssen J&J	11 March 2021	April 2021
Novavax	20 December 2021	Pending
Valneva	Pending	Pending
Sanofi–GSK	Pending	Pending
CureVac	Request withdrawn	No

=== Vaccine calendar ===
When vaccination began in Denmark in 2021, the priority order for vaccination was determined using a Vaccine Calendar. The 10 target groups in descending order of priority are as follows:

1. Residents in nursing homes.
2. People over 65 years who receive both personal care and practical assistance.
3. People aged over 85 years.
4. Healthcare professionals, elderly care professionals and others who are identified to be at risk for infection or are performing a critical function in the society.
5. Persons with pre-existing conditions who have significantly higher risk for severe illness from COVID-19.
6. Relatives of individuals or caregivers who are at increased risk of severe illness from COVID-19.
7. Age group of 80–84.
8. Age group of 75–79.
9. Age group of 65–74.
10. Other age groups.

== Investigation ==
On 23 June 2020, the Folketing decided to have the basis for the decisions behind the 11 March 2020, lockdown of Denmark, examined by an independent investigation team. The report of the investigation team was presented to the Folketing on 29 January 2021. As the lockdown of Denmark was not an initiative that was recommended by the health authorities, a significant focus in the report is the motivation behind the Government's desire to design and implement such an action, which in the ninth chapter of the report is shown to be most likely based on a series of nightly emails written on 10 March 2020, by the Permanent Secretary of the Prime Minister's Office. On 28 May 2024, the Folketing voted for an independent review of the country's handling of the pandemic to be made by VIVE, expected for release in late 2025.

== See also ==
- COVID-19 pandemic in Europe
- COVID-19 pandemic by country and territory
- Living with COVID-19
