= Eros (Dün album) =

Studio album by Dün
- Released: 1981 (re-released in 2000 & 2012 with bonus tracks)
- Recorded: 1981 at Studio Sunrise, Kirchberg, St. Gallen, Switzerland
- Genre: Zeuhl, Progressive rock, experimental rock
- Length: 36:33
- Label: Soleil Atreides (Catalog #: 03)

Eros is the name of the first (and, to date, only) recording made by the French progressive rock band Dün. The record was self-released as a vinyl LP; a thousand copies were printed and sold by the band at concert. The band failed to find a record label for a further, international distribution. The concept of the album was based on Frank Herbert's novel Dune, which particularly fascinated Geeraerts and Vandenbulcke.

== Track listing ==
=== Original 1981 album ===
1. "L'épice" (Jean Geeraerts) - 9:30
2. "Arrakis" (Pascal Vandenbulcke) - 9:40
3. "Bitonio" (Vandenbulcke) - 7:15
4. "Eros" (Geeraerts) - 10:28

=== Bonus tracks on 2012 re-issue ===
1. "Arrakis" (1979 version) - 5:44
2. "Bitonio" (1979 version) - 10:24
3. "Arrakis" (1978 version) - 5:12
4. "Eros" (1978 version) - 7:16
5. "Acoustic Fremen" (Geeraerts, Vandenbulcke, Philippe Portejoie; 1978 recording) - 6:26

== Reception ==
The LP was re-released and remastered several times, including in 2000 by Soleil Zeuhl as a CD with eight tracks, in 2012 with 12 tracks and in 2020 with nine tracks, with bonus tracks added to the original four tracks on the LP.

The album received 4.25/5 points, at 518 votes on the progressive music portal Prog Archives. It is rated as one of the best instrumental progressive rock albums to date and recommended as a unique masterpiece. Also on the German-language progressive rock portal Babyblaue Seiten, the 2000 and 2012 CD editions of the album were rated very positively and received 12.67/15 points. It is praised as a worthwhile rediscovery of a forgotten work, due to its "decidedly virtuoso and varied prog-jazz and zeuhl touch".

== Personnel ==
- Jean Geeraerts: electric & acoustic guitars
- Bruno Sabathe: piano, synthesizers
- Alain Termolle: xylophone, vibraphone, percussion
- Pascal Vandenbulcke: flute
- Thierry Tranchant: bass
- Laurent Bertaud: drums
- Philippe Portejoie: saxophone (7 & 9)

== Production ==
- Recorded & Engineered by Etienne Conod at Studio Sunrise in Kirchberg, Switzerland.
- 2012 remaster by Udi Koomran for Soleil Zeuhl Records
