= Scandinavian =

A Scandinavian is a resident of Scandinavia or maybe something associated with the region, including:

== Culture ==
- Scandinavianism, political and cultural movement
- Scandinavian design, a design movement of the 1950s
- Scandinavian folklore
- Scandinavian language
- Scandinavian literature, literature in the language of the Nordic Countries
- Scandinavian mythology

== People ==
- Scandinavian Americans, in the United States
- Scandinavians or North Germanic peoples, the most common name for modern North Germanic peoples
- Scandinavians, any citizen of the countries of Scandinavia
- Scandinavians, ethnic groups originating in Scandinavia, irrespective of ethnolinguistic affiliation

== Places ==
- Scandinavian Mountains, a mountain range on the Scandinavian peninsula
- Scandinavian Peninsula, a geographic region of northern Europe

== Ships ==
- SS Scandinavian, a ship

== Other ==
- Scandinavian Airlines (SAS), an aviation corporation
- Scandinavian Channel, a defunct American television network
- Scandinavian Defense, a chess opening
- Scandinavian Gold Cup, an international sailing competition established in 1919
- Scandinavian flick, a driving technique
- Scandinavian (Fabergé egg)

== See also ==
- Scandinavia (disambiguation)
- Old Scandinavian (disambiguation)
