= Pax Volumi =

Studio album by Youngblood Brass Band
- Released: 2013
- Genres: Riot Jazz, hip-hop, punk
- Label: Tru Thoughts

Youngblood Brass Band chronology
Is That a Riot? (2006)	Pax Volumi (2013)

Pax Volumi is a 2013 studio album by the Youngblood Brass Band, which saw the return of sousaphonist Nat McIntosh to the band. The album was also the band's first released under its new label, UK-based Tru Thoughts.

== Track listing ==
1. "20 Questions"
2. "Cite the Line"
3. "Whiskey Tango Foxtrot"
4. "A Gust Inside the God"
5. "The Plank Will Nod, and You Will Go"
6. "Ê la Ê"
7. "Overtime"
8. "Erik Owen"
9. "Wrestlevania"
10. "Ain't Nobody"
11. "The Old Rugged Cross/His Eye Is on the Sparrow"
12. "Third Half"
