= Is That a Riot? =

Studio album by Youngblood Brass Band
- Released: 2006
- Genres: Riot Jazz, hip-hop, punk

Youngblood Brass Band chronology
Live. Places. (2005)	Is That a Riot? (2006)	Pax Volumi (2013)

Is That a Riot? is an album recorded in 2006 by the Youngblood Brass Band.

== Track listing ==
1. "March"
2. "Nuclear Summer"
3. "Waiver"
4. "But You Can't Run"
5. "Pala Minima"
6. "JEM"
7. "Dead Man Stomping"
8. "Ake"
9. "Is That a Riot?"
10. "Bone Refinery"
11. "Sell Me More or Like You Just Don't Care"
12. "Will"
13. "Thanks"
