= National Lampoon's Doon =

Book by Ellis Weiner

- Pall Agamemnides, aka Mauve'Bib and the Kumkwat Haagendasz, rides one of the giant pretzels of Doon, the dessert planet
- Author: Ellis Weiner
- Cover artist: Doug Beekman
- Language: English
- Genre: Parody, Science fiction
- Published: November 1984
- Publisher: Pocket Books (National Lampoon)
- Publication place: United States
- Media type: Print (Paperback)
- Pages: 221
- ISBN: 0-671-54144-7
- OCLC: 123103635

National Lampoon's Doon is a parody novel written by Ellis Weiner and published in 1984 by Pocket Books for National Lampoon. Doon is a spoof of Frank Herbert's 1965 science fiction novel Dune.

Doon was reprinted by Grafton Books (ISBN 0-586-06636-5) in 1985. In 1988 William F. Touponce called the book "something of a tribute to Herbert's success on college campuses", noting that "the only other book to have been so honored is Tolkien's The Lord of the Rings," which was parodied by The Harvard Lampoon in 1969.

Dune is set on the dangerous planet Arrakis, sole source of the spice melange, the most valuable substance in the universe. The parody follows a similar storyline, wherein rival restaurant-owning families battle for control of Arruckus, which is overrun by giant pretzels and the source of valuable beer.

== Plot ==
The planet Arruckus is also known as "Doon", the Dessert Planet totally devoid of entrées, and its only export is beer. Within the Galactic Empire, House Hardchargin, the House given charge of Arruckus, has been displaced by House Agamemnides, with Duke Lotto at its head.

Soon after arriving at Doon, Duke Lotto and House Agamemnides fall victim to a scheme originated by Baron Vladimir Hardchargin and implemented by the Duke's own accountant Oyeah, who kept a secret second ledger. When the Emperor called for an audit of the fief, the duplicate ledger made it appear as though House Agamemnides had been cooking the books. Duke Lotto's brief reign over Doon is ended and House Hardchargin is reinstated as fief-holders.

Banished to the sugared wilderness, Pall, head of House Agamemnides, and Lady Jazzica meet with and are eventually accepted by the planet's native population, the Freedmenmen. Pall begins to ascend the power structure of the tribe and takes the Freedmenmen girl Loni as his lover. Pall positions himself as the long hoped-for Freedmenmen messiah, who will finally bring the entrées the Freedmenmen have hungered for. By this route, he assumes and consolidates his power over the natives.

Meanwhile, Baron Vladimir Hardchargin is hungry for more success, and has plans to become the true power in the galaxy. Events come to a head when Pall challenges the Baron to a bake-off, with a new ingredient: peanut butter, rendered from the naturally occurring snack mix's peanuts, and debuting his secret weapon – a liqueur made from beer – Drambrewski. With the support of the people, Pall assumes Imperial control, banishing the Emperor's house to the prison planet Simplicissima Secundus, acquiring the hand of the Emperor's daughter Serutan in a marriage of convenience, and the Freedmenmen woman Loni as his concubine.

== Reception ==
Dave Langford reviewed National Lampoon's Doon for White Dwarf #76, and stated that "with the best will in the world, a parody of a particular author gets tiresome after a few thousand words."

== Reviews ==
- Review by Dave Mead (1985) in Fantasy Review, February 1985
- Review by Thomas G. Mahnken (1985) in Fantasy Review, February 1985
- Review by Alma Jo Williams (1985) in Science Fiction Review, Summer 1985
- Review by Robert Coulson (1985) in Amazing Stories, July 1985

== See also ==
- Bored of the Rings
