= Dün (band) =

French progressive rock band

Background information
- Origin: Nantes, Pays de la Loire, France
- Genres: Progressive rock; experimental rock; Avant-rock; Zeuhl; Rock in Opposition
- Years active: 1976-1983
- Labels: Belle Antique; Soleil Zeuhl
- Past members: Alain Termolles; Bruno Sabathé; Jean Geeraerts; Laurent Bertaud; Pascal Vandenbulcke; Philippe Portejoie; Thierry Tranchant

Dün was a French progressive rock band, active from 1978 to 1981, during which they played shows with Magma, Art Zoyd, Etron Fou Leloublan, and almost became a part of the short-lived Rock in Opposition grouping of bands in Europe. In 1981, they recorded an album, Eros, that never secured proper distribution, and as a result is quite rare.

The French label Soleil reissued the Eros album, which included the four tracks from the original LP plus four bonus tracks, three of which are early demo versions of the tracks on the original release.

== History ==
In 1976, guitarist François Tellard, drummer Laurent Bertaud, pianist Jacques Bretonniere, bassist Michel Blancart and flute player Pascal Vandenbulcke founded the group Vegetaline Boufiol. In 1978, the group changed its name to Kan-Daar. They mainly played cover versions of Mahavishnu Orchestra, Frank Zappa and Magma. The repertoire was later expanded to include pieces by Henry Cow. Saxophonist Philippe Portejoie joined the band and Thierry Tranchant replaced Blancart on bass.

After a few gigs in and around Nantes, the band reformed, with Jean Geeraerts replacing guitarist Tellard and Bruno Sabathe taking Bretonniere's place on keyboards. The band initially changed its name to Dune, from which the final band name Dün was derived a shortly after. In 1980, saxophonist Portejoie left and Alain Termol took over the drums. Between 1978 and 1981, Dün played around 40 concerts in the greater Nantes area, including one as an opener for Magma at the 1979 festival in Douarnenez, but they were hardly able to extend their fame beyond this area. In 1981, the band started the recording of their first LP record Eros, with tracks such as Arrakis and L'Epice already coming from heir Kan-Daar times. The concept of the album was based on Frank Herbert's Dune novel, which particularly fascinated Geeraerts and Vandenbulcke. The production of the LP, which was recorded at Sunrise Studio in Kirchberg, Switzerland, was financed entirely by the band members and the LP was sold at concerts in an edition of 1000 copies. However, the band failed to find a record label for a supraregionally promotion of the LP, which made the original pressing a coveted collectable item and hindered the album from being a major success at the time.

In 1982, the line-up changed again, Termol and Tranchant left and Alain Mellier took over the bass and Christian Dupont the saxophone, which shifted the sound stylistically more towards jazz and was accompanied by extended and contrasting live improvisations. Dün gave a few more concerts until they finally disband in 1983. In 1984, Geeraerts and Vandenbulcke started the Latin jazz band Nevrose Spirituals until Vandenbulcke enrolled to study guitar at the Berklee College of Music in Boston (USA). Geeraerts continued to play in various jazz formations.

In 1992, a local initiative tried to reactivate former rock bands from Nantes for performances such as Dün, Tequila or Danger. Dün performed in the formation of their LP one concert in the MJC (Maison des jeunes et de la culture) of Rezé, which was the final official appearance of Dün.

== Discography ==
- Eros (Soleil Records, 1981)

== Personnel ==
=== The Band ===
- Jean Geeraerts: Electric & Acoustic Guitars
- Bruno Sabathe: Synthesizers & Piano
- Pascal Vandenbulcke: Flute & Gruyérophone
- Thierry Tranchant: Bass
- Laurent Bertaud: Drums
- Alain Termolle: Percussions, xylos, vibras...

=== Additional Musicians ===
- Philippe Portejoie: Saxophone
