= Old Scandinavian =

Old Scandinavian may refer to:

- Proto-Norse, a language spoken from the 3rd to the 7th century
- Old Norse, a language spoken in Scandinavia from the 9th to the 13th century

== See also ==
- Scandinavian (disambiguation)
