= MS Scandinavia =

MS Scandinavia may refer to the following ships:

- MS Scandinavia (1979), launched in 1979 and served under this name until 1982 when she was renamed Tzarevetz
- MS Scandinavia (1981), a cruiseferry launched in 1981, renamed Stardancer in 1985, Viking Serenade in 1990 and converted to a cruise ship in 1991. Subsequently renamed as Island Escape in 2002 and then Ocean Gala in 2015. She was scrapped under the name Ocean Gala 1 in 2018.
- MS Scandinavia (2003), a cruiseferry launched in 1980 as Visby she was in operation as Scandinavia between 2003 and 2015 and renamed Rigel II in 2015
