= APMIS =

PMI Journal
- Discipline: Pathology, microbiology, immunology
- Language: English
- Edited by: L. Kruse Jensen, T. Bjarnsholt, P.Ø. Jensen

Publication details
- Former names: APMIS - Acta Pathologica et Microbiologica Scandinavica; Acta Pathologica, Microbiologica, et Immunologica Scandinavica
- History: 1924–present
- Publisher: Wiley.
- Frequency: Monthly
- Open access: Yes
- License: Hybrid
- Impact factor: 2.8 (2022)

Standard abbreviations
- ISO 4: APMIS

Indexing
- CODEN: APMSEL
- ISSN: 0903-4641 (print); 1600-0463 (web)
- OCLC no.: 17476618

Links
- Journal homepage; Online access; Online archive

PMI Journal, formerly known as APMIS - Acta Pathologica, Microbiologica, et Immunologica Scandinavica, is a monthly peer-reviewed medical journal published by Wiley".

== History ==
The journal was formed in 1988 by a merger of the three sections of Acta Pathologica, Microbiologica, et Immunologica Scandinavica: Section A, Pathology, Section B, Microbiology, and Section C, Immunology. The original journals dated from 1924, originally published as Acta Pathologica et Microbiologica Scandinavica. Since 2012 it has been an electronic-only publication.
