= European Journal of Morphology =

- Language: English
- Former names: Acta Neerlandica Morphologiae Normalis et Pathologicae, Acta Morphologica Neerlando-Scandinavica

Standard abbreviations
- ISO 4: Eur. J. Morphol.
- NLM: Acta Morphol Neerl Scand

Indexing
- ISSN: 0001-6225

Acta Morphologica Neerlando-Scandinavica (ISSN 0001-6225) was an anatomical journal that was published quarterly in Utrecht, Netherlands, by Oosthoek from 1956 to 1989. It consists of volumes 1–27, and is a continuation of the earlier journal Acta Neerlandica Morphologiae normalis et pathologicae (ISSN 0033-183X), published by Oosthoek from 1938 to 1949.

Acta Morphologica Neerlando-Scandinavica was succeeded by the European Journal of Morphology (ISSN 0924-3860), which was published in Lisse, Netherlands, from 1990 to 2005.In the process of becoming the European Journal of Morphology, Acta Morphologica Neerlando-Scandinavica was merged with European archives of biology.
