= Youngblood Brass Band =

American brass band

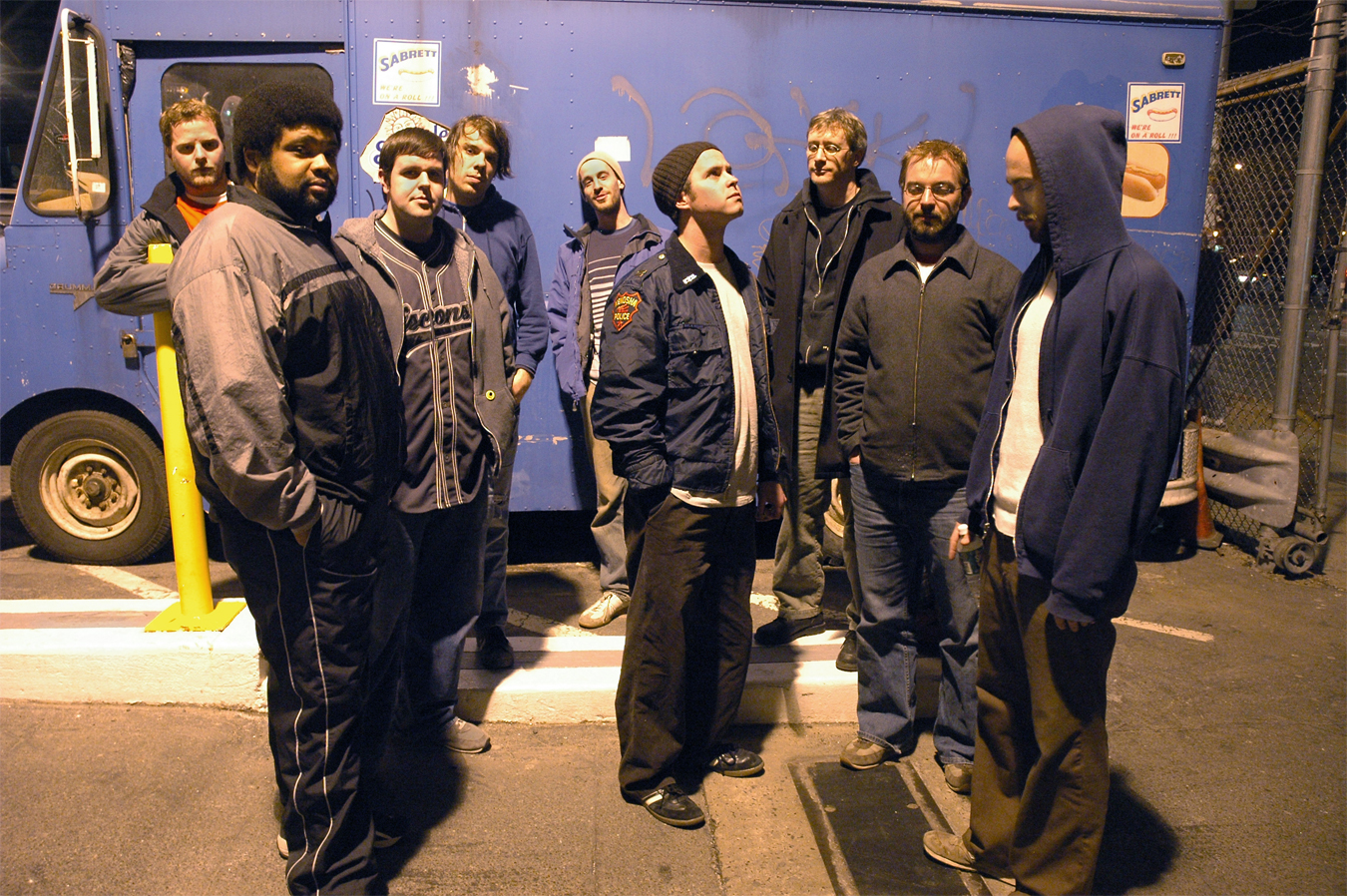

Background information
- Origin: Madison, Wisconsin, United States
- Genres: Jazz; hip-hop; punk jazz
- Years active: 1998–present
- Label: Tru Thoughts
- Members: David Henzie-Skogen; Zach Lucas; Tony Barba; Adam Meckler; Charley Wagner; Joe Goltz; Matt Hanzelka; Nat McIntosh; Conor Elmes; Tom Reschke
- Past members: Arian Macklin (1979–2017); Carl Bartsch; Moses Patrou; Jonah Gaster; Mike Boman
- Website: youngbloodbrassband.com

The Youngblood Brass Band is an American brass band from Madison, Wisconsin that was established in 1998. The band has released six albums and has toured throughout the United States and Europe.

== History ==
The band came together in 1995 as the One Lard Biskit Brass Band, subsequently releasing the album Better Recognize locally. The Youngblood name dates from 1998, the year the group put out their first album, Word On The Street. In 2000, Youngblood released Unlearn, which featured appearances by Talib Kweli, Mike Ladd, DJ Skooly and Ike Willis. Unlearn, which like Word On The Street was released independently, garnered the band significant attention and led to them being signed to Ozone Music NYC. The band's first album for Ozone, called center:level:roar, came out in 2003.

In 2004, sousaphonist and primary arranger Nat McIntosh left the group. As McIntosh's music was a "main component of the band's sound since inception", his departure marked a change in sound for Youngblood Brass Band, as chronicled by the release of Live. Places and Is That a Riot?. The band's work during this time features a harder hip-hop edge with stronger punk influences than their other work.

In 2005, they released a live album entitled live. places. on their Layered Music record label. Is That a Riot? (2006) was supported by multiple international tours and festival appearances.

McIntosh rejoined the band in 2013, and his playing and songwriting both appear on Pax Volumi, which was released on September 9, 2013, by Tru Thoughts. They released 20 Years Young, a compilation spanning the band's two-decade existence, in 2017, and followed it in 2018 with the most recent Covers 1 EP, both released independently.

In 2021, following 13 allegations of grooming students/ex-students by founding member David Henzie-Skogen, Joseph Goltz announced on behalf of the band that "We don't know what the future holds for the band", but that "we will no longer be working under his leadership or with his label going forward."

As of 2025, David Henzie-Skogen is back in the band and playing live shows with them.

== Educational work ==
Band members credit "really good public school system arts-education programs" for inspiring their love of music, and they make an effort to play for schools as well as at clubs and larger venues. Under the aegis of the Layered Arts Collective, which band members co-founded, they also presented musical lectures where in addition to performing, they discussed the history of brass bands and hip-hop. Layered Arts Collective also functioned as a record label/publishing house for their family of artists (including Cougar, a group of experimental rockers that also count David Henzie-Skogen as a member). Youngblood has also released sheet-music transcriptions of all songs included on their albums, since many university and high school music ensembles have included Youngblood in their repertoire.

== Members ==
Current

- David Henzie-Skogen – percussion
- Zach Lucas – alto and tenor saxophones
- Tony Barba – tenor saxophone and bass clarinet
- Adam Meckler – trumpet
- Charley Wagner – trumpet
- Joe Goltz – trombone
- Matt Hanzelka – trombone
- Nat McIntosh – trombone/euphonium/sousaphone
- Miles Lyons – sousaphone
- Conor Elmes – percussion
- Tom Reschke – percussion
- Natalie Baker – live audio engineer

Former

- Arian Macklin
- Carl Bartsch – tenor saxophone
- Moses Patrou – percussion
- Kyle Traska – percussion
- Jonah Gaster
- Josh Smith – trumpet
- Mike Boman – trumpet
- Ben McIntosh – trombone

== Discography ==
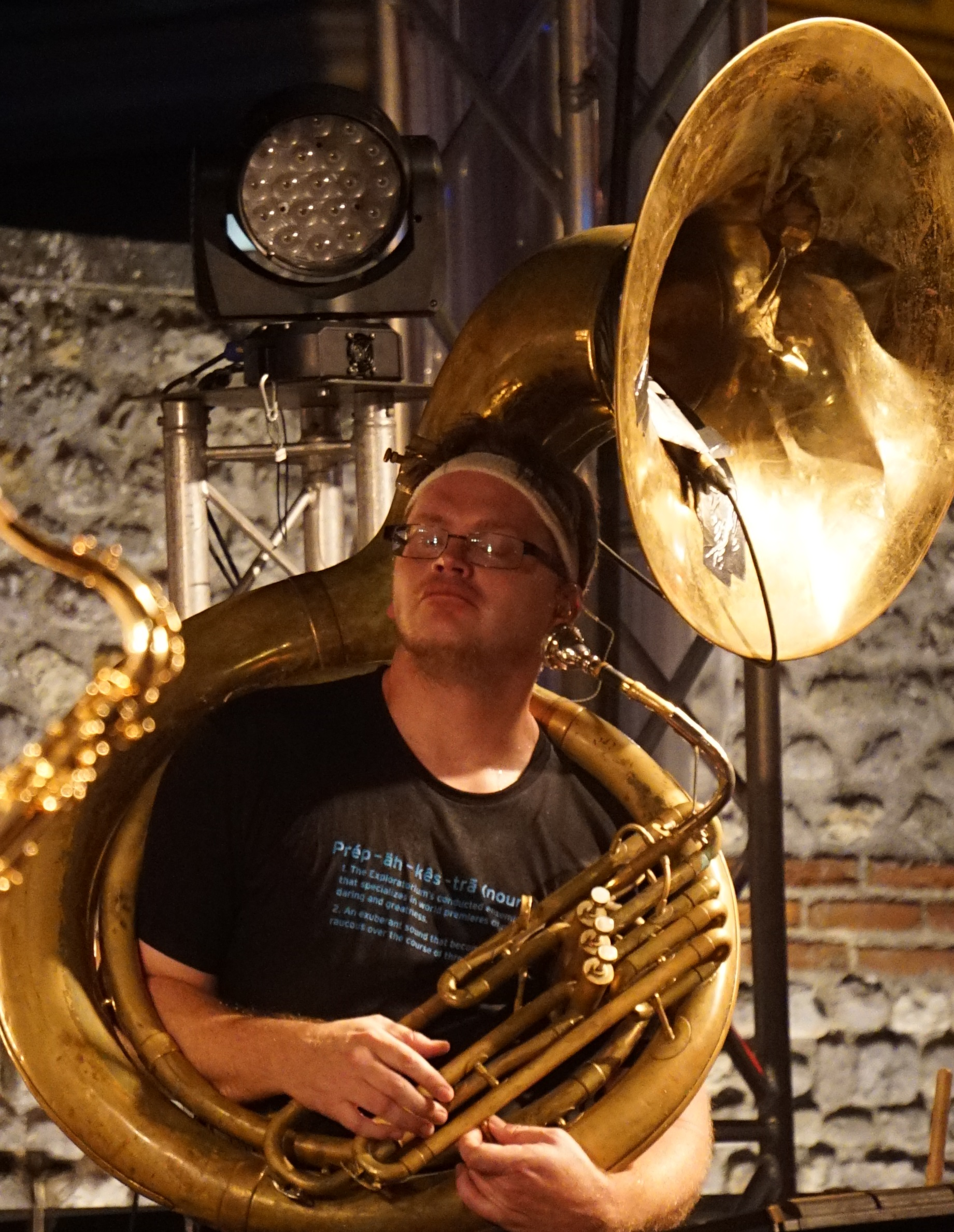
2015

=== Albums ===
- Better Recognize* (1997)
- Word on the Street (1998)
- Unlearn (2000)
- Center:Level:Roar (2003)
- Live. Places. (2005)
- Is That a Riot? (2006)
- Riot Instrumentals EP (2007)
- Pax Volumi (2013)
- 20 Years Young (2017)
- Covers 1 EP (2018)

* recorded by One Lard Biskit Brass Band
