= Center:Level:Roar =

Studio album by Youngblood Brass Band
- Released: 2003
- Genres: Riot Jazz, hip-hop, punk

Youngblood Brass Band chronology
Unlearn (2000)	Center:Level:Roar (2003)	Live. Places. (2005)

Professional ratings
Review scores
Source	Rating
Pitchfork	(3.4/10)
PopMatters	8/10

Center:Level:Roar is an album recorded in 2003 by the Youngblood Brass Band.

== Track listing ==
1. "To Come Together..."
2. "Round One"
3. "Culture:Envy:War"
4. "Brooklyn"
5. "Diaspora"
6. "Human Nature, Part 2"
7. "Thursday"
8. "The Movement"
9. "Avalanche"
10. "Nate McCavish Handbills for No Man"
11. "Camouflage"
12. "Is an Elegy"
13. "Under Your Influence"
14. "V. I. P."
15. "...And Leave Alone"
