= Ellis Weiner =

American author and humorist

Ellis Weiner (born 31 October 1950) is an author and humorist who has previously worked as an editor of National Lampoon and a columnist for Spy Magazine. His humor has also appeared in The New Yorker, Paris Review, and The New York Times Magazine.

Weiner was raised in Pikesville, Maryland. He attended Wellwood Elementary School, Sudbrook Junior High, Pikesville High School and the University of Pennsylvania. Weiner was a split end in the Development Football League from 1961 to 1964 with the Summit Park Colts Association (SPCA). In college, he played drums and sang in a rock band called Droylesden Wake.

His first produced work was the 1967 Pikesville High Junior Play, an original parody using music from H.M.S. Pinafore and other Gilbert and Sullivan operas.

He works regularly as an editor and ghostwriter for Kevin Anderson & Associates Inc.

== Publications ==
=== Books ===
- The Great Muppet Caper!: The Making of the Masterpiece (mock behind-the-scenes book about the film The Great Muppet Caper) (1980)
- National Lampoon's Doon (1984)
- Howard the Duck (novelization of Howard the Duck) (1986)
- Decade of the Year (1987)
- The Dream Team (novelization of The Dream Team) (1989)
- The Northern Exposure Cookbook: A Community Cookbook from the Heart of the Alaskan Riviera (1993)
- Letters from Cicely (1992)
- Drop Dead, My Lovely (2004)
- The Joy of Worry (2004)
- The Big Boat to Bye-Bye (2005)
- Santa Lives!: Five Conclusive Arguments for the Existence of Santa Claus (2005)
- Oy! Do This, Not That! (2009)
- The Templeton Twins Have an Idea (2012)
- The Templeton Twins Make a Scene (2013)
- Atlas Slugged AGAIN: The "Secret Sequel" to the Towering Masterpiece (2015)

==== With Barbara Davilman ====
- Yiddish With Dick and Jane (2004)
- Yiddish With George and Laura (2006)
- Arffirmations: Meditations for Your Dog (2007)
- How to Profit From the Coming Rapture (2008)
- How to Raise a Jewish Dog (2009)
- CATechisms: Fundamentals of Feline Faith (2010)
- The Big Jewish Book for Jews (2010)

==== With Steve Radlauer ====
- Monsters of the Ivy League (2017)

==== With Sydney Biddle Barrows ====
- Mayflower Manners: Etiquette for Consenting Adults (1991)

=== Essays ===
- "Subject: Our Marketing Plan", published in The New Yorker
