= Danish Health Authority =

State-owned entity in Denmark

The Danish Health Authority (Danish: Sundhedsstyrelsen) is a state-owned entity in Denmark sorting under the Ministry of Health. It was founded in 1909 and is situated in Copenhagen in the area of Islands Brygge.

Its areas of responsibility range widely, including establishment of patient safety, coordination and monitoring of health promotion and disease prevention, advisory functions, etc.

The current Director General is Søren Brostrøm.

In August 2015, Minister for Health Sophie Løhde announced that she will strengthen the focus on core tasks, case handling and the development of the health area by establishing four new agencies under the Danish Ministry of Health: The Danish Health Authority, the Danish Patient Safety Authority, the Danish Health Data Authority and the Danish Medicines Agency.
