= MS Stena Scandinavica (1972) =

Ferryboat

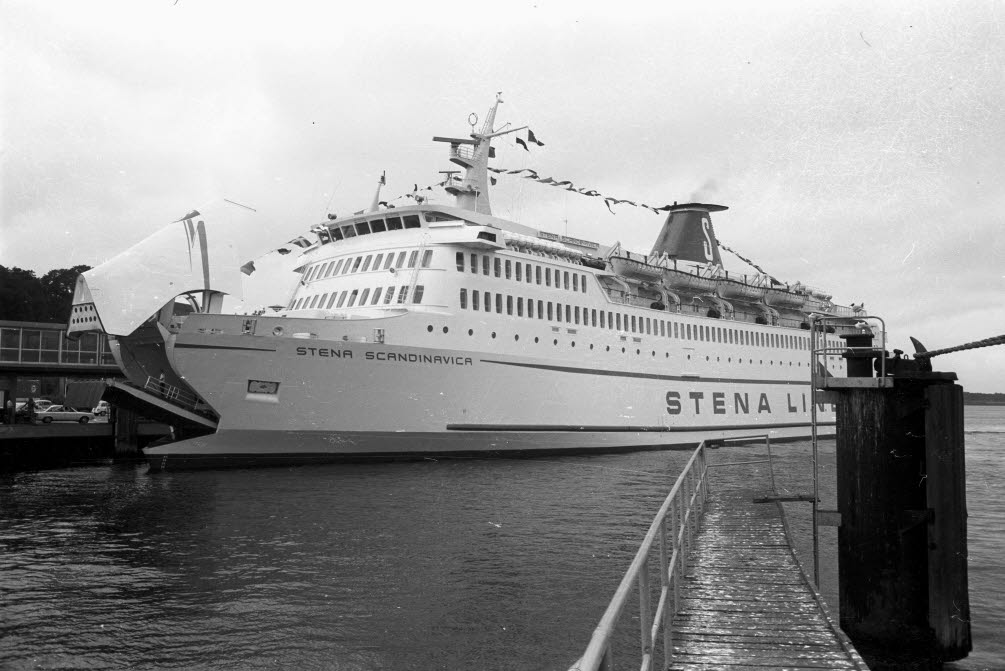
- Stena Scandinavica at Kiel in 1973.

History
- Name: 1974–1978: Stena Scandinavica; 1978–1982: Saint Killian; 1982–1998: Saint Killian II; 1998–2002: Medina Star; 2002–2007: Egnatia III; 2007–2007: Egnatia
- Operator: 1974–1978: Stena Line; 1978–1995: Irish Continental Line; 1995–1998: Irish Ferries; 1998–2003: Laid up; 2003–2003: HML; 2004–2004: Algérie Ferries; 2005–2007: Laid up
- Port of registry: 1974–1978: Gothenburg, Sweden; 1978–1998: Dublin, Ireland; 1998–2007: Panama, Panama
- Builder: Titovo Brodogradiliste, Kraljevica
- Launched: 9 September 1972
- Completed: 1974
- Maiden voyage: 1974
- In service: 1974
- Out of service: 2005
- Identification: IMO number: 7226603
- Fate: Scrapped at Alang, India in 2007.

General characteristics (as built)
- Tonnage: 7,125 GRT
- Length: 124.75 m (409 ft 3 in)
- Beam: 19.54 m (64 ft 1 in)
- Draught: 5.12 m (16 ft 10 in)
- Installed power: 2 × Lindholmen-Pielstick 18PC2 V diesels
- Propulsion: 2 x Controllable pitch propellers
- Speed: 22 knots (40.74 km/h; 25.32 mph)
- Capacity: 1500 passengers

General characteristics (as rebuilt in 1982)
- Tonnage: 10,256 GT
- Length: 156.85 m (514 ft 7 in)
- Capacity: 2000 passengers

MS Stena Scandinavica (IMO number: 7226603) was a car/passenger ferry built in 1974 by Titovo Brodogradiliste in Kraljevica, Yugoslavia for Stena Line. Between 1978 and 1981 the ship sailed for Irish Ferries as Saint Killian. In 1981–1982 the ship was lengthened by 32.10 m (105 ft 4 in) at Amsterdamsche Droogdok Maatschaapij in Amsterdam, The Netherlands. Subsequently, she was renamed Saint Killian II and remained in Irish Ferries service until 1997.

In 1998 the ship was sold to Greek interests and renamed Medina Star, but was laid up. From 2002 until 2005 she sailed as Egnatia III for Hellenic Mediterranean Lines and Algérie Ferries. She was laid up from 2005 until 2007, when she was scrapped in Alang, India as Egnatia.

== Service history ==
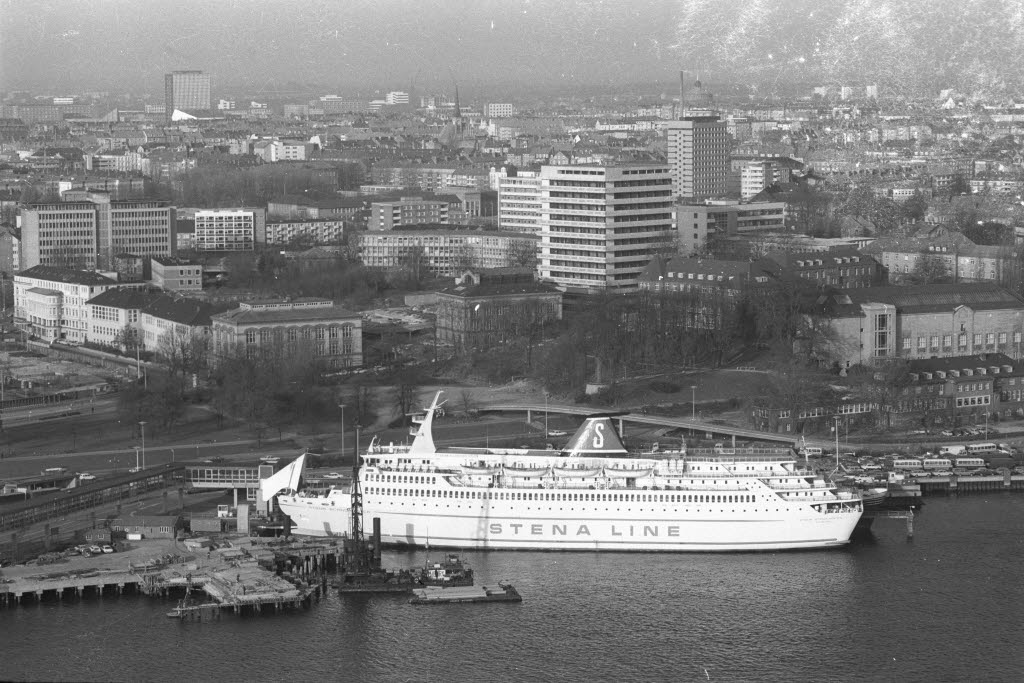
Stena Scandinavica at Kiel in 1975.

The Stena Scandinavica was one of four identical ships built by Yugoslavian shipyards for Stena Line in 1972–1974. She was delivered to Stena on 27 June 1973, primarily for use on their Gothenburg—Kiel service, but she also sailed on the Korsør-Kiel and Gothenburg-Frederikshavn services. In January 1974 she was rebuilt with additional cabins ay Sölvesborgs Varv.

Irish Ferries

In February 1978 Irish Ferries bought the Stena Scandinavica, but she was chartered back to Stena Line until April 1978. On entering service with her new owners he sailed from Rosslare and Cork to Cherbourg and Le Havre.

By the early 1980s Irish Ferries needed more capacity on the Ireland-France routes, and instead of getting new tonnage, it was decided to lengthen Saint Killian. Between February 1981 and February 1982 the Saint Killian was lengthened by 32.10 m (105 ft 4 in) at Amsterdamsche Droogdok Maatschaapij in Amsterdam. Her capacities were increased by 517 passengers and 98 cars.

On 26 February 1982 she was renamed Saint Killian II and was subsequently placed back on the Ireland—France service. On Christmas Eve 1986 a fire disabled the ship off the coast of Cornwall. The vessel was taken under tow to Falmouth where she received temporary repairs, and in January 1987 moved to Blohm & Voss, Hamburg, where she was fully repaired. In February 1987 she resumed service.

In 1997 the Saint Killian II was withdrawn from service following her final departure from Ringaskiddy to Le Havre on 27 September 1997, where she was laid up and put for sale.

Caper Enterprise Ltd.

In October 1998 the Saint Killian II was sold to Cape Enterprise Ltd, Panama and renamed Medina Star. She sailed to Piraeus, Greece, where she was laid up.

Green Island Maritime Ltd.; Commercial Bank of Greece.

In 2000 she was sold to Green Island Maritime Ltd, and in 2001 the Commercial Bank of Greece, but remained laid up.

In 2002 the ship was chartered to Hellenic Mediterranean Lines, renamed Egnatia III and refitted, entering service on the Patras–Igoumenitsa–Korfu–Brindisi service in May 2003.

In June 2004 she was charted to Algérie Ferries for use on their services from Béjaïa, Algiers and Oran to Marseille, and Oran to Alicante. After end of the charter to Algérie Ferries in January 2005 the Egnatia III was laid up at Eleusis Bay, Greece. In September 2007 she was sold to the scrapyard at Alang, India as Egnatia and was subsequently scrapped.
