= Acta Obstetricia et Gynecologica Scandinavica =

Journal of women's health

- Discipline: Women's health
- Language: English
- Edited by: Amarnath Bhide

Publication details
- Former name: Acta gynecologica Scandinavica
- History: 1921–present
- Publisher: Wiley-Blackwell
- Frequency: Monthly
- Open access: Yes
- License: CC BY
- Impact factor: 3.1 (2024)

Standard abbreviations
- ISO 4: Acta Obstet. Gynecol. Scand.

Indexing
- CODEN: AOGSAE
- ISSN: 0001-6349 (print); 1600-0412 (web)
- LCCN: 79007171
- OCLC no.: 67055028

Links
- Journal homepage; Online access; Online archive

Acta Obstetricia et Gynecologica Scandinavica is a monthly peer-reviewed open access medical journal covering all aspects of women's health such as gynecology, obstetrics, female urology, gynecologic oncology, and fertility. The journal is published by Wiley-Blackwell on behalf of the Nordic Federation of Societies of Obstetrics and Gynecology. The editor-in-chief is Amarnath Bhide (University of London). Articles are published fully open access since 30 July 2021.

According to the Journal Citation Reports, the journal has a 2024 impact factor of 3.1.

== History ==
The journal was established in 1921 as Acta Gynecologica Scandinavica by Nordic gynecologists (i.e. from Denmark, Finland, Norway, and Sweden). In 1926 the name was changed to Acta Obstetricia et Gynecologica Scandinavica. Initially articles were published in German, French, or English, but since 1972 all articles are published in English.

== Editors-in-chief ==
The following persons are or have been editor-in-chief:

- 1921–1924: John Hjalmar Forssner
- 1925–1948: James Heyman
- 1949–1960: Axel Westman
- 1961–1970: Alf Sjovall
- 1970–1977: Axel Ingelman-Sundberg
- 1978–1990: Ingemar Joelsson
- 1990–1993: Per Bergsjo
- 1994–1999: Wiggo Fischer-Rasmussen
- 1999–2000: Lars Hamberger
- 2000–2007: Per Olof Janson
- 2007–2014: Reynir Tomas Geirsson
- 2015–2024: Ganesh Acharya
- 2025–present: Amarnath Bhide
