= Dune: House Harkonnen =

2000 novel by Brian Herbert and Kevin J. Anderson

- First edition cover
- Authors: Brian Herbert; Kevin J. Anderson
- Audio read by: Scott Brick
- Cover artist: Stephen Youll
- Language: English
- Series: Prelude to Dune
- Genre: Science fiction
- Publisher: Spectra
- Publication date: 2000
- Publication place: United States
- Media type: Print (hardback & paperback)
- Pages: 624
- ISBN: 0-553-11072-1
- OCLC: 43903779
- Dewey Decimal: 813/.54 21
- LC Class: PS3558.E617 D87 2000
- Preceded by: Dune: House Atreides
- Followed by: Dune: House Corrino

Dune: House Harkonnen is a 2000 science fiction novel by Brian Herbert and Kevin J. Anderson, set in the fictional Dune universe created by Frank Herbert. It is the second book in the Prelude to Dune prequel trilogy, which takes place before the events of Frank Herbert's celebrated 1965 novel Dune. The Prelude to Dune novels draw from notes left behind by Frank Herbert after his death.

Dune: House Harkonnen debuted at #11 on The New York Times Best Seller list, and rose to #8 in its second week of publication.

== Plot summary ==
Eighteen years have passed since Shaddam IV succeeded his father as Padishah Emperor of the Known Universe. However, his rule is precarious as his wife Anirul has been instructed by her Bene Gesserit sisterhood to bear him only daughters. Shaddam's authority is also challenged by the powerful House Harkonnen, whose illegal stock-piling of melange is of great concern to the Emperor. In order to monopolize the spice, Shaddam and his trusted advisor and friend, Count Fenring, plan to synthesize the substance with the help of Hidar Fen Ajidica, a Tleilaxu Master Researcher. Ajidica sets up laboratories to accomplish this purpose on the newly conquered planet of Ix, formerly the home of House Vernius. By the end of the novel, Ajidica tells Fenring that the manufacture of synthetic spice has been a success, although the validity of his claim is highly dubious.

Meanwhile, on Caladan, Duke Leto Atreides bids Duncan Idaho farewell. Duncan is headed for Ginaz, where he will study to become a swordmaster. Leto and his friends, Kailea and Rhombur Vernius, are still struggling to liberate the siblings' former homeworld, but they have made little progress so far. Kailea becomes Leto's concubine, though he refuses to marry her for obvious political reasons. Rhombur seeks out a companion from the Bene Gesserit order and is matched with a young woman named Tessia who gives him a new sense of drive and purpose. After receiving a plea for help from C'tair Pilru, an Ixian rebel, Rhombur begins supplying the Ixian resistance with limited aid, though his attempts are greatly hindered by the Emperor's Sardaukar. Kailea soon gives birth to Leto's son, Victor. After the child's birth, she becomes increasingly dissatisfied with her role as Leto's concubine, wanting the Duke to marry her so that their son can succeed his father someday. Kailea's lady-in-waiting, Chiara, is actually a Harkonnen agent sent to poison Kailea's mind against Leto.

Matters are complicated further with the arrival of Jessica, a Bene Gesserit and the secret daughter of Reverend Mother Gaius Helen Mohiam and Baron Vladimir Harkonnen (though Jessica herself is unaware of her parentage). Jessica is presented to Leto as a gift from the Bene Gesserit, although the sisterhood has the ulterior motive of using the pair in their breeding program. At first, Leto refuses to have much to do with Jessica and tries to remain faithful to Kailea. However, as he and Kailea grow farther apart, he begins to seek out Jessica's company. Finally, Kailea is driven to make an attempt on Leto's life by having an explosive device planted on his skyclipper. At the last minute, Atreides house guard Captain Swain Goire decides to let Victor and Rhombur go along with Leto, and the boy dies instead. Leto is relatively unharmed, but Rhombur is reduced to little more than a charred lump of flesh. Fearing that Leto will guess that she is responsible for the death of their son and driven by guilt, Kailea kills her lady-in-waiting (a spy from the Harkonnen) and then commits suicide by jumping out a window. The Tleilaxu offer to grow a ghola of Leto's deceased son in exchange for the barely alive body of Rhombur Vernius. Leto ultimately refuses, after much soul-searching, knowing that the Tleilaxu intend only harm towards House Vernius and House Atreides. Instead, Tessia, a Bene Gesserit and wife of Rhombur, with consent of Leto hires Dr. Wellington Yueh, an expert in the field of cybernetics, to fashion a cybernetic replacement body for Rhombur. Leto and Jessica fall deeply in love, leading Jessica to decide to conceive a son for Leto's sake, directly disobeying the Bene Gesserit's order that she have a daughter.

On the Harkonnen homeworld of Giedi Prime, the Baron Harkonnen grows weaker and more corpulent due to a strange disease which, unbeknownst to him, was inflicted upon him by a vengeful Mohiam. After killing a slew of doctors who fail to diagnose or alleviate his condition, he hires Dr. Yueh for a massive price. Yueh reveals to the Baron that Mohiam is responsible for his ailment. In response, the Baron attempts to take revenge against the Bene Gesserit, but fails miserably. Meanwhile, the Baron's brother, Abulurd, uncovers an illegal stockpile of spice on Lankiveil. Rather than turn his brother in to the Emperor, Abulurd, a benevolent ruler and the polar opposite of his brother Vladimir, uses the stockpile to benefit his people. Upon discovery of this, Glossu Rabban, Abulurd's firstborn son, strangles his father to death, an act which earns him the nickname of "Beast." Baron Harkonnen also kidnaps Abulurd's other son, Feyd-Rautha, and tries to raise him as his own.

Young Liet-Kynes comes of age and continues the realization of his father Pardot Kynes's dream of taming the hostile conditions on Arrakis. Also on Arrakis, the Lady Margot Fenring seeks out the Fremen in order to explain the disappearance of several other members of the Bene Gesserit order, including the Reverend Mother Ramallo. She finds that the Bene Gesserit have already integrated themselves into Fremen society and implanted the myths of the Missionaria Protectiva into Fremen culture.

Gurney Halleck, a farm laborer on Giedi Prime, witnesses the capture of his sister Bheth at the hands of Harkonnen agents. Halleck fights for his sister's release and is savagely beaten by the Harkonnen. After four years of searching for Bheth, Gurney receives a note from her that tells him she is still alive. A Harkonnen census taker tells Gurney that Bheth paid him to smuggle Gurney's family the note. The man gives Gurney information that leads him to a pleasure house near Mount Ebony. He infiltrates the pleasure house and finds his sister tied to a bed, entwined with two Harkonnen soldiers. Bheth's larynx has been cut out so that she cannot speak. Gurney is again beaten to a pulp by the soldiers, and when he regains consciousness he is in a Harkonnen slave pit, where he is forced to mine and polish obsidian ore. The Harkonnen overseers repeatedly try to break Gurney's spirit through a variety of means: forcing him to watch while his sister is raped and finally murdered, drugging him, and beating him. Gurney finally manages to escape by stowing himself away in a shipment of the ore, which happens to be a gift from Leto Atreides to his concubine Kailea. Gurney leaves the shipment before it arrives at his final destination and joins the renegade Earl Dominic Vernius. After the Earl is killed on Dune, Gurney travels to Caladan to find the Vernius heirs, and swears his loyalty to House Atreides.

== Reception ==
Dune: House Harkonnen debuted at #11 on The New York Times Best Seller list, and rose to #8 in its second week of publication.

== Adaptation ==
In October 2022, Boom! Studios announced a 12 issue comic adaptation of Dune: House Harkonnen to follow the adaptation of Dune: House Atreides and other Dune comics written by the original authors Brian Herbert and Kevin J. Anderson. It concluded in January 2024.
