= Margot Fenring =

Fictional character created by Frank Herbert

- Dune character
- Léa Seydoux as Lady Margot in Dune: Part Two (2024)
- First appearance: Dune (1963–1965)
- Last appearance: The Heir of Caladan (2022)
- Created by: Frank Herbert
- Portrayed by: Léa Seydoux (Dune: Part Two)

In-universe information
- Affiliation: Bene Gesserit
- Spouse: Count Hasimir Fenring
- Children: Marie Fenring

Margot, Lady Fenring is a fictional character from the Dune universe created by Frank Herbert. She is featured in Herbert's Dune (1965), and is a major character in the Prelude to Dune prequel trilogy (1999–2001) and the 2008 novel Paul of Dune by Brian Herbert and Kevin J. Anderson. She later appears in the Caladan Trilogy (2020–2022). Margot is the Bene Gesserit wife of Count Hasimir Fenring, a close friend of the Padishah Emperor Shaddam IV, but is loyal to the Sisterhood.

Léa Seydoux portrays Margot in Denis Villeneuve's 2024 film Dune: Part Two.

== Description ==
Margot is one of the Bene Gesserit, a secretive matriarchal order who have achieved superhuman abilities through mental and physical conditioning, and the use of the drug melange. Under the guise of humbly "serving" the Empire, the Sisterhood is in fact a major power in the universe, using its many areas of influence to subtly guide humanity along the path of its own plan for humanity's future. To this end, the Bene Gesserit install some of their initiates in noble families as wives and concubines to their advantage.

Margot's Bene Gesserit abilities include acute observation and awareness, seduction and sexual imprinting, and precise control of her body chemistry, which allows her to ensure conception and choose the sex of the child. Despite general prohibitions against sharing Bene Gesserit skills with males, Margot has trained her husband Count Fenring, who is sympathetic to the goals of the Bene Gesserit, in the acute observation practiced by the Sisterhood.

Feyd-Rautha Harkonnen describes Margot in Dune:

He stared at the Lady Fenring. She was golden-haired and willowy, her perfection of figure clothed in a flowing gown of ecru—simple fitness of form without ornament. Gray-green eyes stared back at him. She had that Bene Gesserit serene repose about her that the young man found subtly disturbing.

== Appearances ==
Margot appears in Herbert's novel Dune (1965), in which she warns fellow Bene Gesserit Lady Jessica of impending danger to the Atreides, and is later sent by the Sisterhood to visit Feyd-Rautha Harkonnen. Margot is also a major character in the Prelude to Dune prequel trilogy (1999–2001), the 2008 novel Paul of Dune, and the Caladan Trilogy (2020–2022) by Brian Herbert and Kevin J. Anderson.

=== Dune (1965) ===
In Dune, Duke Leto Atreides accepts stewardship of the lucrative but dangerous desert planet Arrakis, previously controlled by his enemy, Baron Vladimir Harkonnen. Leto's Bene Gesserit concubine, Lady Jessica, discovers a coded message from Margot, the wife of the former governor of Arrakis, Count Fenring. Also a Bene Gesserit, Margot has left Jessica a warning that the Atreides, especially Leto and Jessica's son Paul, are in danger from the Harkonnens, and alerts her to the existence of a traitor in the Atreides household. Paul evades a trap set for him, but a devastating attack by the Harkonnens leaves Leto dead, and forces Paul and Jessica to flee into the desert. Due to the harsh conditions and an oncoming sandstorm, they are soon presumed dead as well.

Margot is sent by the Bene Gesserit to seduce Feyd-Rautha Harkonnen and to "preserve the bloodline" by retrieving his genetic material, through conception, for their breeding program. She also conditions Feyd via "hypno-ligation", which will allow the Bene Gesserit to control him in the future if necessary. After Paul is presumed dead, Margot and her husband Count Fenring discuss what a shame it is, and Margot prophetically recounts a Bene Gesserit saying: "Do not count a human dead until you've seen his body. And even then you can make a mistake."

Paul is later revealed to be alive, and attempts to depose Shaddam. Count Fenring observes Paul, "seeing with eyes his Lady Margot had trained in the Bene Gesserit way, aware of the mystery and hidden grandeur about this Atreides youth", and subsequently refuses Shaddam's command that he kill Paul. Soon after, as Reverend Mother Mohiam watches Paul and Feyd duel to the death, she comments on the existence of Margot's child by Feyd: "If both died here that would leave only Feyd-Rautha's bastard daughter, still a baby, an unknown, an unmeasured factor, and [Paul's sister] Alia." Margot has planted a command in Feyd's mind through which Paul can paralyze him and thus win the duel easily, but Paul is able to defeat Feyd without using it. Seizing control of Arrakis, Paul deposes Shaddam, who is exiled to Salusa Secundus. Count Fenring and Margot willingly join the former emperor in exile.

Margot as seen in the collectible card game Dune (1997), designed after the 1984 film.

=== Dune: House Atreides (1999) ===
During the events of Dune: House Atreides, unmarried Margot Rashino-Zea is hand-selected by Bene Gesserit Kwisatz Mother Anirul to infiltrate the household of Abulurd Harkonnen on Lankiveil. One of the Bene Gesserit's best commandos, she knows sixty-three ways to kill a human using nothing but her fingers, and has also been trained in the ways of spying and ferreting out information, flash-memorization techniques and connecting mismatched tidbits of data to construct a broader picture. The Sisterhood hopes to find incriminating evidence, perhaps hidden there by the Baron Vladimir Harkonnen, that they can use to coerce him into participating in their breeding program. Margot soon discovers that the Harkonnens have been grossly underreporting melange production to CHOAM and the Padishah Emperor Elrood IX, and are stockpiling it for their own purposes. Margot and her future husband Count Fenring later convince Emperor Shaddam IV to marry Reverend Mother Anirul by explaining the benefits of an alliance with the Bene Gesserit. Through this arrangement the Sisterhood seek influence over the Imperial throne by ensuring that Shaddam will never have a son.

=== Dune: House Harkonnen (2000) ===
In Dune: House Harkonnen, Margot seeks out the Fremen on Arrakis in search of a group of Bene Gesserit sisters working on the Missionaria Protectiva, including the Reverend Mother Ramallo, who had previously disappeared. The manual from a Fremen desert survival pack called a fremkit, similar to the Bene Gesserit Azhar Book but "adapted to Fremen ways", indicates to Margot that the Bene Gesserit have integrated themselves into Fremen society and implanted the myths of the Missionaria Protectiva into Fremen culture.

=== Paul of Dune (2008) ===
In Paul of Dune, Margot and Count Fenring are raising Feyd and Margot's daughter—whom they have named Marie—as their own. Between the events of Dune and Dune Messiah (1969), the Fenrings train their child as both an assassin and a Bene Gesserit, but reject the interference of the Sisterhood itself in favor of their own plans for Marie to seize the Imperial throne from Paul Atreides. Marie has Margot's blond hair and features, as well as Feyd's pale blue eyes. At age six, the Fenrings declare her ready. Marie is accepted into Paul's court as a playmate for his young sister Alia. At a banquet with her visiting parents, Marie and the Fenrings execute their well-planned assassination attempt on Paul. Alia manages to kill Marie, but Margot's revelation of her daughter's paternity surprises Paul enough to allow Count Fenring to stab him mortally. Paul's concubine Chani uses the poisonous Water of Life to help save him, and he lives. Rather than kill the Fenrings, Paul banishes them to Salusa Secundus into permanent exile with Shaddam, whom they now loathe.

== In adaptations ==
The character of Margot was to have an increased role in the film adaptation of Dune planned by director Alejandro Jodorowsky in the 1970s, which was never made. Both Margot and Count Fenring are omitted from David Lynch's 1984 film Dune. However, Count Fenring plays a minor part in the 2000 miniseries Frank Herbert's Dune, and some of Margot's actions are attributed to Princess Irulan as part of director John Harrison's expansion of Irulan's role in that adaptation. Though Margot was not included in the 2021 Denis Villeneuve film Dune, Léa Seydoux portrays the character in the 2024 sequel, Dune: Part Two. Margot has been described as a critical character in the film.
