= Count Fenring =

Fictional character created by Frank Herbert

- Dune character
- Miroslav Táborský as Hasimir Fenring in the Dune miniseries (2000)
- First appearance: Dune (1963–1965)
- Last appearance: The Heir of Caladan (2022)
- Created by: Frank Herbert
- Portrayed by: Miroslav Táborský (2000 miniseries)

In-universe information
- Occupation: Assassin; Governor of Arrakis; Siridar-Absentia of Caladan
- Affiliation: House Corrino
- Spouse: Margot Fenring
- Children: Marie Fenring
- Relatives: Lady Chaola Fenring (mother); Dalak, husband of Wensicia

Count Hasimir Fenring is a fictional character in the Dune universe created by Frank Herbert. He is featured in the 1965 science fiction novel Dune by Frank Herbert, and is also a key character in the Prelude to Dune trilogy by Brian Herbert and Kevin J. Anderson. He later appears in the 2008 novel Paul of Dune, and the Caladan Trilogy (2020–2022).

Fenring is the longtime friend and advisor to Padishah Emperor Shaddam IV, and a formidable fighter. He serves as Shaddam's agent, emissary, or assassin as necessary. Fenring is married to Bene Gesserit Lady Margot.

== Description ==
In Dune, Shaddam's daughter Princess Irulan writes via epigraph, "My father had only one real friend, I think. That was Count Hasimir Fenring...one of the deadliest fighters in the Imperium." She goes on to describe him as "a dapper and ugly little man". Baron Vladimir Harkonnen calls Fenring "a killer with the manners of a rabbit...the most dangerous kind." The Baron's nephew Feyd-Rautha Harkonnen describes Fenring as "a small man, weak-looking. The face was weaselish with overlarge dark eyes. There was gray at the temples. And his movements—he moved a hand or turned his head one way, then he spoke another way. It was difficult to follow."

As Shaddam's chief counsellor, Fenring is described as "the Emperor's errand boy" in the novel. He appears to suffer from a verbal tic, but his unusual speech pattern is actually a "humming" code employed to privately communicate with his Bene Gesserit wife Margot. Herbert writes that "Fenring seldom did anything he felt to be unnecessary, or used two words where one would do, or held himself to a single meaning in a single phrase." Baron Harkonnen refers to Fenring as "Ambassador to the Smugglers", indicating Shaddam IV's interest in spice smuggling operations on Arrakis. Herbert also notes that Fenring had been trained by Margot in the Bene Gesserit method of acute observation. Paul Atreides notes that "Fenring was one of the might-have-beens, an almost Kwisatz Haderach, crippled by a flaw in the genetic pattern—a eunuch, his talent concentrated into furtiveness and inner seclusion."

== Storylines ==
=== Dune ===
Prior to the events of Dune, Fenring serves as the Imperial Agent on Arrakis during the Harkonnen regime, and then as Governor of Arrakis during the handover period between House Harkonnen and House Atreides. He is later the Siridar-Absentia of the Atreides homeworld of Caladan while the Atreides occupy Arrakis. In Dune, the Harkonnens, secretly aided by the Emperor's fierce Sardaukar warriors, destroy the Atreides forces and reclaim control of Arrakis. Fenring and Margot visit the Harkonnen homeworld of Giedi Prime, where the Count informs Baron Harkonnen that Shaddam is displeased with the way the invasion of Arrakis was handled, and frustrated by his failure to suppress the disruptive native Fremen population. Fenring is also there on the Emperor's behalf to assess the Harkonnen heir, Feyd, which irks the Baron. Margot is also observing Feyd for the Bene Gesserit, who count him as an important part of their breeding program. With the Count's knowledge and acceptance, Margot has been tasked with retrieving Feyd's genetic material through conception. Impressed with Feyd but lamenting his Harkonnen upbringing, Fenring notes, "I can see now why we must have that bloodline".

When Shaddam is forced into a corner by Paul Atreides, the Emperor and his Truthsayer, the Bene Gesserit Reverend Mother Mohiam, realize that Shaddam's only option is treachery. Fenring is summoned and ordered to kill Paul, but refuses, aware that Paul represents the success of the Bene Gesserit breeding program of which Fenring himself is a failure.

In "Appendix IV: The Almanak en-Ashraf (Selected Excerpts of the Noble Houses)" in Dune, Herbert writes that Fenring is a cousin and former childhood companion of Shaddam, and is rumored to have poisoned Shaddam's father, Elrood IX. Another epigraph by Irulan explains that "the measure of Count Fenring's friendship" with Shaddam is shown by both Fenring's efforts to conceal Shaddam's complicity in the Harkonnen invasion, and by his refusal of Shaddam's command to kill Paul. After Paul ascends the Imperial throne, Fenring joins Shaddam in his forced retirement on the prison planet Salusa Secundus, and Fenring dies in 10,225 A.G.

=== Prelude to Dune series ===
The Prelude to Dune prequel trilogy by Brian Herbert and Kevin J. Anderson establishes that Fenring's mother is Chaola, a Bene Gesserit and lady-in-waiting to Habla, the fourth wife of Shaddam's father Elrood IX, and served as wet nurse to both her son and Shaddam. Though Fenring is a failure in the Bene Gesserit breeding program to produce the Kwisatz Haderach, he is a supremely intelligent and perceptive killer. It is noted in Dune: House Atreides, "Over the years, Fenring had murdered at least fifty men and a dozen women, some of whom had been his lovers, of either sex." One of these was Shaddam's older brother Fafnir, killed to secure Shaddam's position as heir. In the novel, the Imperial concubines call Fenring "the Ferret" because of "his narrow face and pointed chin."

In Dune: House Atreides, Fenring assassinates Shaddam's father, Elrood IX, using a slow-acting poison administered on orders from Shaddam himself. Shaddam subsequently gives Fenring the title of Imperial Spice Minister and orders him to supervise Elrood's Project Amal, an early attempt by the Tleilaxu to create synthetic melange in order to remove dependence upon the planet Arrakis, by that time the only source of melange in the Known Universe. Although Tleilaxu Master Hidar Fen Ajidica manages to create an artificial melange (called ajidamal, or amal) that seems to have the original's properties, it does not work properly. During the events of Dune: House Corrino, Fenring uses two Spacing Guild heighliners to secretly test the synthetic melange. Disastrously, the first heighliner emerges from foldspace at the wrong point, strikes the defensive shields of Wallach IX and plummets into the atmosphere to its destruction. The flawed spice also disrupts and confuses the thoughts, feelings and prescience of D'murr Pilru, the Navigator of the second heighliner. Affected by the tainted melange, D'murr misguides his ship out of the Known Universe and collapses; with a fresh supply of real melange he is able to return the ship safely to Guild Headquarters before dying. All records and laboratories of Project Amal are destroyed by Fenring himself afterward when House Vernius retakes the planet Ix, and Shaddam later denies all knowledge of it. When Shaddam starts to act without Fenring's counsel due to jealousy, he begins making grievous mishaps, in particular using atomic weapons and a biological plague, and threatening to destroy Arrakis. Eventually and with some reluctance, Shaddam again begins following Fenring's advice.

=== Sandworms of Dune ===
In Hunters of Dune (2006), the first of Brian Herbert and Kevin J. Anderson's two-part finale to the original Dune series, an ancient knife is discovered on the Atreides homeworld of Caladan that is covered in traces of Paul Atreides' blood. This genetic material is used by the Face Dancer Khrone to create a ghola of Paul, named Paolo, as part of the thinking machine plot to dominate humanity.

In Sandworms of Dune (2007), the dagger is used by Paolo in his duel-to-the-death with the Bene Gesserit's own Paul Atreides ghola. It is noted that, among the knife's many notable uses, "Hasimir Fenring stabbed Emperor Muad'Dib with it and nearly killed him" sometime between the events of the novels Dune and Dune Messiah (1969).

=== Paul of Dune ===
Hasimir and Margot are raising Feyd and Margot's daughter — whom they have named Marie — as their own in the Brian Herbert/Kevin J. Anderson novel Paul of Dune (2008). Between the events of Dune and Dune Messiah (1969), the Fenrings train their young child as both an assassin and a Bene Gesserit, but reject the interference of the Sisterhood itself in favor of their own plans for Marie to seize the Imperial throne from Paul Atreides. Marie is accepted into Paul's court as a playmate for his young sister Alia; at a banquet with her visiting parents, six-year-old Marie and the Fenrings execute their well-planned assassination attempt on Paul. Alia manages to kill Marie, but Margot's revelation of her daughter's paternity surprises Paul enough to allow Hasimir to stab him near-mortally. Paul's concubine Chani uses the poisonous Water of Life to help save him, and he lives; rather than kill the Fenrings, he banishes them to Salusa Secundus into permanent exile with Shaddam, whom they now loathe.

== In adaptations ==
Both Fenring and his wife Margot are omitted from David Lynch's 1984 film Dune.

Fenring plays a minor part in the 2000 miniseries Frank Herbert's Dune, where he is portrayed by Miroslav Táborský. His function here is more of an advisor to the Emperor. Additionally, some of Margot's actions are attributed to Princess Irulan (essentially the Fenrings' visit to Giedi Prime) as part of director John Harrison's expansion of Irulan's role in the adaptation.

Fenring is also omitted from Denis Villeneuve's 2024 film Dune: Part Two, although his wife Margot does appear.

The character of Fenring was also to appear in the film adaptation of Dune planned by Alejandro Jodorowsky in the 1970s.

Fenring appears in the 2025 video game Dune: Awakening, voiced by Darin De Paul. In the game's alternate timeline, in which Paul Atreides is never born, Fenring is still the Imperial Spice Minister and governor of Arrakis, charged with overseeing spice production as well as the War of Assassins between House Atreides and House Harkonnen. Late in the game story's first chapter, the player character encounters Fenring, who is able to discern the character being a Bene Gesserit agent, and puts the character to work for him to assassinate a number of targets across Arrakis.
