= Princess Irulan =

Fictional character in the Dune universe

- Dune character
- Virginia Madsen as Irulan in Dune (1984)
- First appearance: Dune (1965)
- Created by: Frank Herbert
- Portrayed by: Virginia Madsen (1984 film); Julie Cox (2000 series / 2003 series); Florence Pugh (2024 film / 2026 film)

In-universe information
- Affiliation: Bene Gesserit; House Atreides
- Family: House Corrino
- Spouse: Paul Atreides
- Children: Leto II Atreides (stepson); Ghanima Atreides (stepdaughter)
- Relatives: Shaddam IV (father); Anirul (mother); Chalice (sister); Wensicia (sister); Josifa (sister); Rugi (sister); Farad'n (nephew)

Princess Irulan (/ˈɪrəlɑːn/) is a fictional character in the Dune universe created by Frank Herbert. She first appears in Dune (1965) and is later featured in Dune Messiah (1969) and Children of Dune (1976). The character's birth and early childhood are touched upon in the Prelude to Dune prequel trilogy (1999–2001) by Herbert's son Brian and by Kevin J. Anderson, and she is a principal character in the Herbert/Anderson series Heroes of Dune (2008–2009).

The character of Irulan serves as a de facto narrator in Dune, with excerpts of her later writings used as epigraphs before each chapter of the novel. Within the storyline, Irulan is established as the eldest daughter of the 81st Padishah Emperor Shaddam IV and Anirul, a Bene Gesserit of Hidden Rank. In Dune, the character appears in person only near the end of the novel but continues as a regular character in the sequels Dune Messiah and Children of Dune. Epigraphs attributed to Irulan also appear—to a much lesser extent—in these subsequent novels and others in the extended series.

Irulan is portrayed by Virginia Madsen in the 1984 film Dune and by Julie Cox in the 2000 TV miniseries Frank Herbert's Dune and its 2003 sequel, Frank Herbert's Children of Dune. The character is played by Florence Pugh in the 2024 film Dune: Part Two.

== Description ==
Within the storyline, Irulan is established as the eldest daughter of the 81st Padishah Emperor Shaddam IV and Anirul, a Bene Gesserit of Hidden Rank. She has four younger sisters named Chalice, Wensicia, Josifa and Rugi, and no brothers. In Dune, Irulan is described through Paul Atreides' eyes:

Paul's attention came at last to a tall blonde woman, green-eyed, a face of patrician beauty, classic in its hauteur, untouched by tears, completely undefeated. Without being told it, Paul knew her—Princess Royal, Bene Gesserit-trained, a face that time vision had shown him in many aspects: Irulan. There's my key, he thought.

Baron Vladimir Harkonnen notes that Irulan has eyes "that looked past and through him". In Dune Messiah, the Tleilaxu Face Dancer Scytale refers to Irulan as "a tall blonde beauty ... she carried herself with an aristocrat's hauteur, but something in the absorbed smoothness of her features betrayed the controls of her Bene Gesserit background".

Although Irulan is noted to have been "trained in the deepest of the Bene Gesserit ways, destined to be a Reverend Mother", in the series she never undergoes the dangerous ritual spice agony to achieve this. In Dune Messiah she is noted to have been "well trained for a task at which she had failed, a flawed Bene Gesserit creation". Of Irulan, Lady Jessica says in Children of Dune, "Irulan had never been the most accomplished adept in the Bene Gesserit—valuable more for the fact that she was a daughter of Shaddam IV than for any other reason; often too proud to exert herself in extending her capabilities."

== Appearances ==
=== Dune ===
Each chapter of Dune begins with an epigraph attributed to the Princess Irulan. In forms such as diary entries, historical commentary, biography, quotations and philosophy, these writings set tone and provide exposition, context and other details intended to enhance understanding of Herbert's complex fictional universe and themes. These epigraphs serve as a framing device for the novel's narrative. Ryan Britt of Inverse writes, "The Irulan framing in the book gives the future-tense aspects of Paul's visions another layer: the story of Paul's rise to power has already happened ... this creates an interesting layer of perception for the reader. It's not as though the fairly omniscient narration of Dune is unreliable per se, but there is an indication that the prose might be biased, which is itself a comment on the story." Irulan herself appears in person only near the end of the novel.

In Dune, Shaddam orders Duke Leto Atreides to take over the valuable spice melange operations on the desert planet Arrakis. Though seemingly a reward, it is instead a means for Shaddam to destroy Leto, whose rising power and influence in the Landsraad threatens the emperor. The Atreides are soon attacked by the forces of House Harkonnen, longtime enemies of the Atreides, secretly supplemented by Shaddam's seemingly unstoppable Imperial Sardaukar troops. Leto is killed, and Paul and his Bene Gesserit mother Jessica flee into the desert and are presumed dead. A crisis on Arrakis begins when the mysterious Muad'Dib, in actuality Paul Atreides, emerges as a leader of the native Fremen tribes rebelling against the rule of the Harkonnens. With the production of the all-important spice disrupted, Shaddam is forced to personally intervene. Irulan accompanies her father and his army to Arrakis to impose order, but Shaddam's Sardaukar are disastrously defeated by the Fremen. Paul sets his terms: the Imperial armada will leave Arrakis, Shaddam will step down and Paul will marry Irulan—or he will destroy all spice production. Shaddam is furious, but Irulan says: "Here's a man fit to be your son." Once Paul defeats the Baron Harkonnen's treacherous heir Feyd-Rautha in single combat, and Count Fenring refuses the Emperor's order to kill Paul, Shaddam capitulates. Paul intends to accede to the throne in Shaddam's place, assuming power of the Empire in Irulan's name. He assures his concubine, Chani, that he will not give Irulan any affection, or children. Jessica, formerly the concubine to Paul's late father, reassures Chani that though Irulan will have the Atreides name, "history will call us wives."

Emmet Asher-Perrin of Tor.com noted that while Shaddam realizes "by bits and pieces" that Paul has defeated him, Irulan "recognizes it from the beginning". Asher-Perrin explained "how nonplussed she is by the entire event. She's like 'sure, I'll marry that guy, he seems cool' and keeps trying to get her dad to chill out." He adds, "You have to wish that the book had delved into [Irulan's] arc more, rather than presenting her as a scholar only. We could use a bit more of her personality, a bit more insight into her mind."

=== Dune Messiah ===
Twelve years later in Dune Messiah, Irulan is Imperial Consort, but is Paul's wife in name only, as he intends his beloved concubine Chani to bear his children and heirs apparent. Any hope Irulan has of bearing a new Atreides-Corrino royal bloodline with Paul—and retaining the Imperial House Corrino's influence in some form—has been lost. She is also under pressure from the Bene Gesserit, who seek to preserve the Atreides bloodline, if not subvert Paul's rule entirely. This resentment, coupled with Bene Gesserit orders that Paul not be allowed to father an heir with Chani, has driven Irulan to secretly drug the Fremen woman with dangerous contraceptives for years. As a result, the new Emperor and his concubine are without children. When Chani begins a special Fremen fertility diet high in melange, Irulan loses her ability to administer the contraceptives; though urged by the Bene Gesserit Reverend Mother Gaius Helen Mohiam to chemically abort any potential fetus, Irulan protests. Irulan does, however, become part of a conspiracy against the Emperor involving the Bene Gesserit, Tleilaxu, and Spacing Guild. Paul says of her at this time:

That's a real princess down the hall. She was raised in all the nasty intrigues of an Imperial Court. Plotting is as natural to her as writing her stupid histories!

Despite her ties to both the Bene Gesserit and her deposed father, Paul values Irulan as an advisor and has made her a member of his high council. Chani ultimately discovers not only Irulan's role in her infertility but the fact that the contraceptives have caused permanent damage and will jeopardize her current pregnancy. Chani seeks to kill Irulan, but Paul forbids it. He is secretly somewhat grateful to Irulan, as he has seen through his prescience that childbirth will bring Chani's death, and so Irulan has unwittingly extended Chani's life. Chani dies after giving birth to Paul's twin children, Leto II and Ghanima, and a newly blinded Paul soon thereafter wanders alone into the desert to die, as is Fremen custom for the blind. Subsequently Paul's sister Alia notes, "Do you know what I must do for [Paul]? I must save the life of the Princess Irulan. That one! You should hear her grief. Wailing, giving moisture to the dead; she swears she loved him and knew it not. She reviles her Sisterhood, says she'll spend her life teaching Paul's children ... She reeks of trustworthiness!" The ghola Duncan Idaho realizes that the defection of Irulan leaves the Bene Gesserit with "no remaining lever against the Atreides heirs."

=== Children of Dune ===
Deserting the Bene Gesserit, Irulan subsequently devotes herself to House Atreides and helping to raise Paul and Chani's orphaned twins. Meanwhile, Irulan's sister Wensicia plots to assassinate Leto and Ghanima to reclaim power for the Corrinos. Irulan also serves as chief advisor to Alia, who reigns as Holy Regent for young Leto and Ghanima. During the events of Children of Dune, Irulan attempts to serve as a guide and confidante to Ghanima, but is often flustered by the adult consciousness the twins possess as a result of being pre-born and having access to Other Memory. Ghanima cares for Irulan, but Alia never trusts the Princess, due to Irulan's Corrino heritage and Alia's own increasing paranoia. This personal distrust proves to be well-placed, as Irulan follows Ghanima and Stilgar into the desert during the Fremen rebellion against Alia's tyranny. Though the other rebels are massacred, Irulan and Stilgar are imprisoned upon their capture, and presumably freed when Leto deposes Alia.

=== Other novels ===
Irulan appears briefly as a child in Dune: House Corrino (2001), the third novel in the Prelude to Dune prequel trilogy by Brian Herbert and Kevin J. Anderson, set prior to Dune.

Irulan is a principal character in the Heroes of Dune series of novels by Brian Herbert and Anderson. Half of the story of Paul of Dune (2008) takes place between Frank Herbert's Dune and Dune Messiah. Irulan decides to become Paul's official biographer, shaping his legend. In the story, as Paul's Jihad rages, Shaddam seeks to regain his throne, and Irulan accepts the "task of building the legend of Muad'Dib". The other half of the novel is Irulan's chronicle of Paul's early years, between House Corrino and Dune. The Winds of Dune (2009) is set between Frank Herbert's Dune Messiah and Children of Dune. In the novel, Paul's disappearance into the desert has left a power vacuum, and Irulan and his other advisors struggle to determine what path his empire should take. Princess of Dune (2023) focuses on Irulan and Chani two years before the events of Dune.

== In adaptations ==
Director Alejandro Jodorowsky intended Amanda Lear to play Irulan in his planned 1970s film adaptation of Dune, which was never made. Irulan is portrayed by Virginia Madsen in the 1984 film Dune, and by Julie Cox in the 2000 TV miniseries Frank Herbert's Dune and its 2003 sequel, Frank Herbert's Children of Dune. Irulan does not appear in the 2021 film Dune, which covers the first part of the book, but does appear in the sequel film Dune: Part Two, where she is portrayed by Florence Pugh.

=== Dune (1984) ===
David Lynch's 1984 film recreates Irulan's narrative function literally, with the character narrating an introduction to the Dune universe, but only appearing briefly in person at the beginning and very end of the film. Michel Chion explained, "Where Lynch has been most audacious is in the structuring of the story. He devised a kind of spiralling structure, described by him as circular, in which all the information needed to understand the story is given from the start rather than being doled out progressively. Via the voice of the narrating princess we are bombarded straight away with facts and names. Only later, little by little, are the facts allowed to find their meaning and the names their faces." Francesca Annis, who portrayed Lady Jessica in the film, said "When I first went to see the film at the premiere ... as soon as Princess Irulan started to talk in voice-over at the beginning, explaining the story, I thought 'Uh oh, this film is in trouble.' Any Hollywood film that has to explain itself in detail at the beginning is in trouble."

Madsen said that Helena Bonham Carter was originally cast in the role, but ended up having a scheduling conflict with the film A Room with a View. According to Madsen, there was a "mad scramble" to recast, and she was signed for Dune and two potential sequels. Madsen called the role her "big break" and said: "Really all I had to do was that monologue, and I was really a glorified extra".

=== Frank Herbert's Dune (2000) ===
The 2000 miniseries, however, invents an extensive subplot for Irulan. Director John Harrison said that he felt the need to expand Irulan's role because she plays such an important part in later books, and her epigraphs make her a significant presence in the novel. Additionally, the character gave him a window into House Corrino. Actress Julie Cox noted that Harrison made Irulan "more of a love interest and to offset the weirdness of Paul marrying a stranger at the end".

In the miniseries, Irulan is sent to Arrakis to confirm Leto's position, the presence of the Princess Royal meant to defray Leto's suspicions about the Emperor's motives. While there, she strikes up a friendship with his son, Paul. After the attack on the Atreides, Irulan immediately realizes that her father is the only one who could have possibly helped the Harkonnens, and expresses her displeasure at being used. Later on, Irulan spies on Reverend Mother Mohiam's clandestine meeting with a Spacing Guild operative, and their conversation makes her realize that there is more to what is happening on Arrakis than meets the eye. Under the pretext of being bored, Irulan heads for the Harkonnen homeworld of Giedi Prime and coyly coerces Feyd into confirming her suspicions. As the Fremen uprising grows worse, Irulan ingratiates herself to her father's council and offers valuable military advice. She is the only one of Shaddam's advisers to realize the connection between Muad'Dib and Paul Atreides, the truth of which she reveals to the court upon Alia's capture. Rather than simply agreeing to Paul's demands, it is Irulan who actually suggests their marriage.

Besides the final scene, in which Irulan is betrothed to Paul, her only appearance in the miniseries based on an actual excerpt from the novel is her visit to Feyd. However, in the book it is a different Bene Gesserit, Margot Fenring, who visits the Harkonnen heir, on assignment from the Sisterhood to retrieve his genetic material (through conception) for their breeding program. The miniseries does not suggest this as Irulan's motive, particularly since she hands Feyd off to one of her operatives before he can actually sleep with her.

Asher-Perrin called the expansion of Irulan's role in the plot "the smartest change" from the novel, and noted the importance of Irulan as an expository tool in the miniseries. He wrote that "Cox is elegant and cunning with the part, and makes Irulan's own journey every bit as interesting as Paul's on the flip side of the political machine." Austin Jones of Paste wrote, "Julie Cox as Irulan is unquestionably a major highlight. She serves as a sympathetic eye in which to view House Corrino as her father plots with the Harkonnens for the downfall of House Atreides. Many of the performances in the miniseries are quite lacking ... but Cox brings a certain vivacity to an otherwise dense story. Much of the strength in Dune lies in the women guiding the plot from behind-the-scenes, and Irulan is undoubtedly a key player not to be trifled with alongside Jessica and Reverend Mother Mohiam."

=== Frank Herbert's Children of Dune (2003) ===
Cox reprised her role for the 2003 sequel Frank Herbert's Children of Dune, which covers the plot of both Dune Messiah and Children of Dune.

Laura Fries of Variety wrote: "[Daniela] Amavia and Cox as the tortured Alia and the put-upon Irulan offer layered performances". Asher-Perrin praised Irulan's "complete character arc" in the miniseries as an improvement to the character's treatment in the source novels, and noted:

There are a few clever changes made in order to connect the two stories better, the primary one being that rather than having Princess Irulan work as a conspirator against Paul alongside the Bene Gesserit, the Spacing Guild, and the Tleilaxu, her sister Wensicia is brought to the fore sooner and given that role. This has two advantages; it means that Irulan's love for Paul doesn't come out of left field the way it does at the end of Dune Messiah, and it means that the story spends more time with Wensicia ... who is played with antagonistic relish by Susan Sarandon.

Asher-Perrin also wrote, "There are other moments of perfect execution ... The dual conversations between Irulan and Reverend Mother Gaius Helen Mohiam—and later Jessica—are gorgeous, offering subtitles to their sign language while an entirely different conversation plays out in words."

=== Dune: Part Two (2024) ===
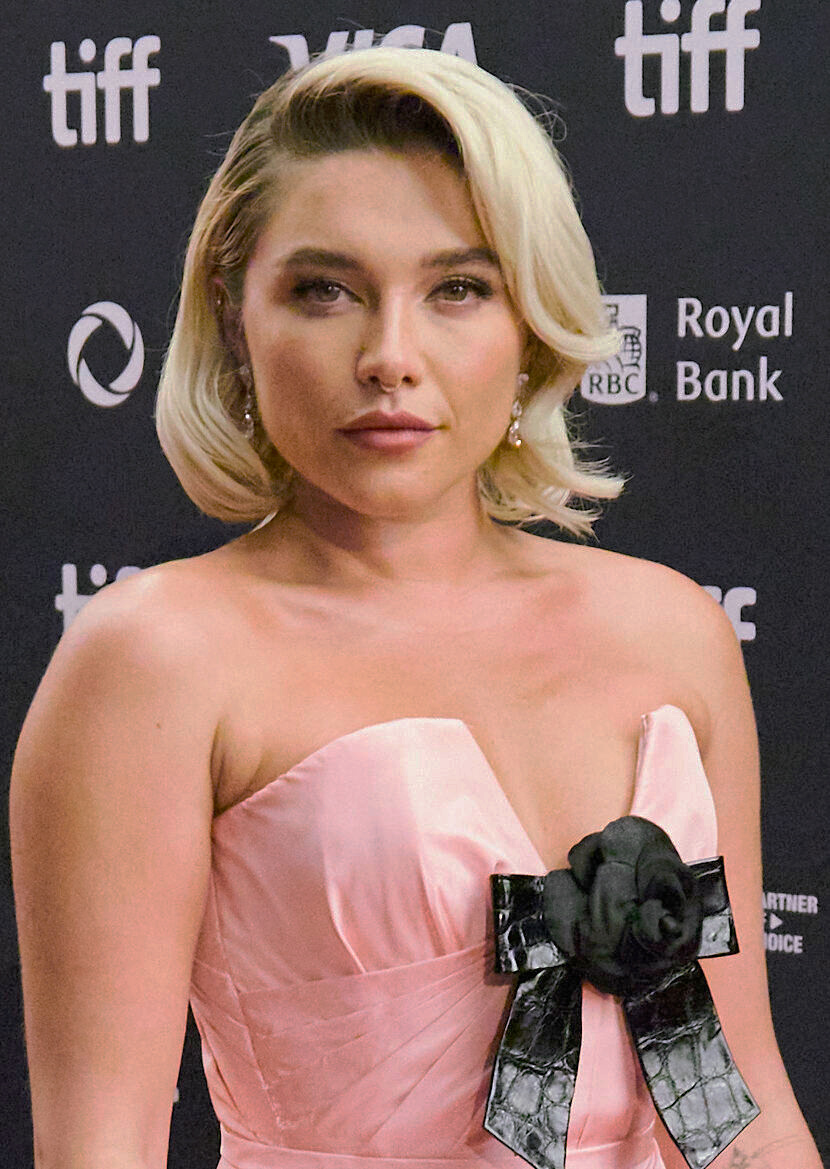
Florence Pugh portrays Irulan in the 2024 film Dune: Part Two and its upcoming sequel, Dune: Part Three.

Irulan does not appear in Denis Villeneuve's 2021 film Dune, which covers the first part of the book. Villeneuve dispensed with the novel's framing epigraphs by Irulan, which according to Ryan Britt of Inverse leaves "certain expository details" and "at least one political and historical side of Dune" missing. David Crow of Den of Geek explained, "Without [Irulan's] interluding anecdotes about the man Paul Atreides will become (or at least is romanticized to be in Irulan's texts), we are left to experience this story as Paul does: chronologically and in real time." Adrienne Westenfeld of Esquire called this a "cinematic" choice, and wrote,"The result is a more fiercely interior experience of Paul's journey to messianic prominence ... [and] to shift any sort of frame device from the royal Princess Irulan to the indigenous Chani is to provide a welcome juxtaposition to the frequent focus on noble political power brokers."

In March 2022, Florence Pugh entered negotiations to join the film's cast as Irulan, and her role was confirmed in May 2022. Irulan appeared in the 2024 sequel film Dune: Part Two.

=== Dune: Part Three (2026) ===
Pugh is confirmed to reprise the role of Irulan in the upcoming sequel film, Dune: Part Three (2026), which will adapt Dune Messiah.

== Family tree ==
House Atreides family tree

House Atreides
House Harkonnen
House Corrino	Baron Vladimir; Harkonnen	Tanidia Nerus (Note: The Prelude to Dune prequel series (1999–2001) establishes that Tanidia Nerus is an alias of Gaius Helen Mohiam.)
Anirul	Shaddam IV	Leto I Atreides	Lady Jessica (Note: In Dune (1965), Jessica is the concubine of Leto I, and Chani becomes the concubine of their son, Paul.)
Count Dalak; Kenola	Princess Wensicia	Princess Irulan	Paul Atreides	Chani
Josifa	Farad'n	Ghanima Atreides	Leto II Atreides	Leto II Atreides; The Elder (Note: The infant Leto II Atreides is murdered in Dune, and his brother Leto II is later also named after their grandfather, Leto I, in Children of Dune (1976).)	Duncan Idaho
Chalice	Rugi	Many generations (Note: Per God Emperor of Dune, Duncan Idaho gholas was used several times in Leto II's breeding program)	Alia Atreides	Hayt (Note: Hayt is a ghola of Duncan Idaho, a kind of clone made using his corpse.)
Moneo Atreides
Siona Atreides
Many generations
Miles Teg
Darwi Odrade
