= Leto II Atreides =

Fictional character from Dune

- Dune character
- Leto II as God Emperor, from the paperback cover of God Emperor of Dune (1981)
- First appearance: Dune Messiah (1969)
- Last appearance: The Winds of Dune (2009)
- Created by: Frank Herbert
- Portrayed by: James McAvoy (2003 series); Nakoa-Wolf Momoa (2026 film)

In-universe information
- Species: Human/Sandworm hybrid (God Emperor of Dune)
- Title: God Emperor
- Affiliation: Fremen
- Family: House Atreides
- Relatives: Paul Atreides (father); Chani (mother); Ghanima Atreides (sister/wife); Leto Atreides (older brother murdered in infancy); Leto I Atreides (grandfather); Lady Jessica (grandmother); Liet-Kynes (grandfather); Vladimir Harkonnen (great-grandfather); Alia Atreides (aunt); Princess Irulan (stepmother)

Leto II Atreides (/ˈleɪtoʊ əˈtreɪɪdiːz/) is a fictional character from the Dune universe created by Frank Herbert. Born at the end of Dune Messiah (1969), Leto is a central character in Children of Dune (1976) and is the title character of God Emperor of Dune (1981). The character is brought back as a ghola in the Brian Herbert/Kevin J. Anderson sequels which conclude the original series, Hunters of Dune (2006) and Sandworms of Dune (2007). Leto also appears as a child in the prequel The Winds of Dune (2009).

Leto is the son of Paul Atreides and his Fremen concubine Chani, and the twin brother of Ghanima. Leto is named for his paternal grandfather Duke Leto I Atreides, who is killed in the Harkonnen invasion of the desert planet Arrakis (Dune) during the events of Dune (1965). Leto II is the second child of Paul to bear that name, the first having been killed as an infant by the Emperor's Sardaukar in Dune.

Leto is portrayed by James McAvoy in the 2003 miniseries Frank Herbert's Children of Dune. The character will be played by Nakoa-Wolf Momoa in the upcoming Denis Villeneuve film Dune: Part Three.

== Character biography ==
=== Dune Messiah ===
Chani dies giving birth to Leto and his twin sister Ghanima near the end of Dune Messiah. Blinded by the blast of a nuclear weapon called a stone burner, Paul is at a disadvantage when the Tleilaxu Face Dancer Scytale holds a knife over the newborns and threatens their death if Paul does not surrender his Empire to the Tleilaxu. Paul suddenly finds that he is able to see through the eyes of the infant Leto, allowing him to aim and throw a crysknife that kills Scytale.

=== Children of Dune ===
In Children of Dune, Leto and Ghanima are nine years old. Because of the melange ingested by their mother, which causes unusual effects for the Atreides bloodline, the twins are "pre-born", meaning that as fetuses they had been awakened to consciousness and to their genetic memories; they had been born as fully matured human beings in the bodies of infants. At the start of the novel, Leto is not prescient to the degree that his father Paul had been, but he senses the test his father had faced — to embrace a prescient vision of the universe is to set the universe on that path, a terrible responsibility that comes with terrible power. At the end of Dune Messiah, Paul had forsaken that responsibility by walking into the desert — his time as the Fremen messiah had shown him that he was not strong enough to be messiah/tyrant to the universe. Leto believes that he must face the same test.

At the same time, the Imperium created by Paul is ruled by his sister Alia Atreides as regent. The horror of the pre-born—the reason the Bene Gesserit call them "Abominations"—is that they are easily possessed by the ego-memories of their ancestors. When Bene Gesserit awaken to their "other memories" in the rite of the spice agony, they are adults with fully formed personalities, and can withstand the inner assault of their forebears; the pre-born have no such defense. Like Leto and Ghanima, Alia had been pre-born, and she succumbs to the pressure under an intense dose of spice. Among her ancestors is the Baron Vladimir Harkonnen, still hungry for revenge against his enemies, the Atreides. Alia is possessed by him, and unconsciously turns against the Atreides empire, plotting to kill Leto and Ghanima and to tear down the Imperium in a bloody civil war.

Independently, Leto and Ghanima both solve the problem of the pre-born. Leto constructs his own personality out of an executive committee of his ancestors; with all (the important ones) inhabiting him, none can possess him individually. Following an assassination attempt by House Corrino, Leto disappears into the desert leaving Ghanima behind. As part of Leto's plan, Ghanima hypnotizes herself to believe that Leto had been killed. The intense mental discipline needed for this self-deception builds a safe haven in Ghanima's mind for her own personality to safely develop, with the memory of Chani acting as a guardian.

Leto finds Jacurutu, a sietch that has been forbidden to anyone by Fremen law. There he faces the test his father had refused to take, and embraces prescience, its visions, its attendant power, and the terrible price it will extract — to follow his vision, Leto will become a symbiote with the sandworm, setting the universe on the Golden Path, a future in which humanity's survival is assured. After consuming massive amounts of spice, he allows many sandtrout to cover his body, the concentration of spice in his blood fooling the creatures:

The sandtrout squirmed on his hand, elongating, stretching ... becoming thin, covering more and more of his hand. No sandtrout had ever before encountered a hand such as this one, every cell supersaturated with spice ... Delicately Leto adjusted his enzyme balance ... The knowledge from those uncounted lifetimes which blended themselves within him provided the certainty through which he chose the precise adjustments, staving off the death from an overdose which would engulf him if he relaxed his watchfulness for only a heartbeat. And at the same time he blended himself with the sandtrout, feeding on it, feeding it, learning it ... He located another, placed it over the first one ... Their cilia locked and they became a single membrane which enclosed him to the elbow ... This was no longer sandtrout; it was tougher, stronger. And it would grow stronger and stronger ... With a terrible singleness of concentration he achieved the union of his new skin with his body, preventing rejection ... They were all over his body now. He could feel the pulse of his blood against the living membrane ... My skin is not my own.

— Children of Dune

This layer gives Leto tremendous strength and speed, acting as a living powered exoskeleton and also protection from mature sandworms, who mistake his sandtrout-covered body for a lethal mass of water. He calls it a "living, self-repairing stillsuit of a sandtrout membrane," and soon notes that he is "no longer human." Leto returns to wrest the Imperium from Alia and take his rightful place as Emperor.

=== God Emperor of Dune ===
Thirty-five hundred years later in God Emperor of Dune, Leto is almost fully transformed into a sandworm. He is virtually invulnerable to physical harm, save for a severe vulnerability to water, inherited from the sandworms. Arrakis is now a verdant planet with a great river named after Duncan Idaho. Except for Leto, the sandworms are extinct, and all that is left of the desert is a preserve set aside for Leto alone. The old institutions, the Bene Gesserit, the Bene Tleilax, the Spacing Guild, the houses Major and Minor, the Landsraad, the technocrats of Ix, and CHOAM, have all faded from power in the face of Leto's hydraulic despotism. He has absolute control of the spice on which the whole universe depends, and therefore has a stranglehold on the universe. His enforced peace has kept the universe quiet but in stagnation, by his design. His all-female army of Fish Speakers keeps order and act as priestesses.

Leto has taken over the Bene Gesserit's breeding program for himself, the same program that produced his father, the Kwisatz Haderach. Leto's Golden Path is nearly assured now, and his long rule has begun to bore him; the trap of prescience is an existence without surprises. To ensure that humanity will survive, Leto has spent millennia enforcing quiescence on humanity: people rarely travel, rarely fight in wars, rarely do anything but live and worship him. This repression has created in humanity a deep and urgent need to explode upon the universe, scattering itself beyond the reach of any single tyrant. Leto seeks a solution in which he might die without destroying his people; if a god commits suicide, his worshippers would commit suicide with him. The only option is revolution, so Leto breeds for the person who will overthrow him: Siona Atreides, the daughter of his majordomo, Moneo.

Siona is the second human to carry a gene that makes her invisible to prescience and thus uncontainable by it, the first being Count Fenring, from the novel Dune. Siona can pass on her genes to her descendants, whereas Fenring was a genetic eunuch. Since Siona cannot be seen in a vision, she cannot be controlled by a vision, nor can her descendants. Thus the tyranny of prescience will end with Siona — humanity can never again be bound by a powerful prescient like Muad'dib or the God Emperor himself.

Siona's partner in revolution is Duncan Idaho, the constant companion of Leto throughout the long millennia. For his entire reign, Leto has had a ghola of Duncan in charge of his Fish Speaker army. The Duncans represent the old Atreides loyalty, along with everything vital in humanity, so something in the Duncans always rebels against the blasphemous chimaera Leto has made of himself; many Duncans die trying to kill Leto. When Siona finally arrives, she finds in Duncan a justification for revolt.

Meanwhile, the rest of the universe is scheming to kill Leto as well. The Bene Tleilax try many ham-fisted schemes. The technocrats of Ix craft a human, Malky, to seduce Leto, a being of perfect evil, a Devil to Leto's God. Malky is a charming Lucifer, and as ambassador to Leto's court he plumbs the depths of Leto's piety. In Dune Messiah, the Face Dancer Scytale reveals to a Reverend Mother that the Bene Tleilax created their own Kwisatz Haderachs, and discovered that Kwisatz Haderachs will die before becoming their opposites (and so can be killed by manipulating them into betraying themselves). Malky's purpose is to get Leto to turn against his holy creativity, but fails because Leto, more than anyone, understands the blasphemy of his enterprise.

At the same time as Leto is breeding a psi-invisible human, Ix invents another solution: no-chambers, electro-mechanical constructs that hide their contents from prescient vision. Inside the first no-chamber, the Ixians grow their replacement for Malky: his niece Hwi Noree, a creature of pure goodness. Leto falls in love with her, and plans to marry her. He is not alone in loving her, however, for his current Duncan has also fallen to her charms. By this chain of events, Leto weakens his godhood enough to allow Siona's revolt the possibility of success.

Leto plans to wed Hwi in what remains of an old Fremen village near the former Sietch Tabr, but changes his mind at the last instant to use the Museum Fremen's Tuono Village, the place where Moneo had sent Siona and Duncan in an attempt to keep the peace and keep Duncan alive, safe from the God Emperor's wrath. However, that is not to be.

The Royal Peregrination, the journey on foot for any of Leto's trips, to Tuono has all the appearance of a normal trip. However, Siona and Duncan, both well aware of the God Emperor's coming and his schemes to breed them, are primed for rebellion, not quiet acceptance. Siona uses her power over Nayla, Leto's pet Fish Speaker, to set in motion his demise. At the point of the Sareer's guardian wall that opens to allow for the passage of the Idaho River, Nayla, caught in her faith in Leto and hoping he will perform a miracle, opens fire on the bridge with a lasgun, destroying it as Leto, Hwi, and Moneo are crossing, dropping them into the Idaho River. The water destroys Leto's sandworm body, decomposing it into the sandtrout that will lock up the water in their bodies, recreating the conditions for the sandworms to re-appear, each with a pearl of Leto's consciousness and adaptability inside it. Leto dies, his last vision that of the Golden Path, shining brightly in humanity's future. His total reign spanned 3509 years.

Before arrival to Tuono, Hwi asks Leto to "share their souls", since they cannot interact carnally after Leto's loss of humanity. Her deep empathy and ability to see beyond the abyss that separates Leto from all human beings and to love him brings a tear in each of his eyes. Earlier, it was remarked that the God Emperor was unable to shed tears, partly because of the disrupting effect water had on his worm body and partly because of the Fremen-inherited inhibition of wasting body water. (The discussion in which that matter had been brought up sparked a deep interest and concern for Hwi.)

Although the Atreides (Moneo, Siona) that surround him needed to be shown (by activating their genetically-inherited prescient powers) the absolute horrors that could only be avoided by Leto's apparent tyranny in order for them to support the Golden Path, Hwi is able to understand, without having seen any proof, the altruism in Leto's actions and the ultimate sacrifice that he had to make, and is able to love him.

This interaction evokes strong emotions in Leto, including fear, admiration, and mutual understanding, giving him a renewed sense of hope.

After Leto's death, driven by the Famine Times and the pent up desires of thousands of years of Leto's enforced peace, which bred stagnation and isolation, humanity explodes out into the universe in waves of migration known as the Scattering, as predicted and forced by Leto's Golden Path. Humanity's exponential expansion in the Scattering spreads them beyond the ability of any single force to control or threaten their destiny. Thus Leto's Golden Path gave humanity both immunity to domination by prescient rulers via Siona's genetic trait, and immunity to domination by any single ruler or disaster by spreading them far and wide into unknown reaches of the universe.

The sandworms which once again travel Dune after Leto's death carry, in his words, "a pearl of his awareness locked forever in an endless dream." They and Leto are worshipped as the Divided God, and their existence keeps humanity locked on Leto's Golden Path.

=== Sequels ===
More than 1500 years after his death, Leto II is brought back as a ghola on board the no-ship Ithaca in Brian Herbert and Kevin J. Anderson's continuation of the original series, Hunters of Dune (2006). During an assassination attempt, he appears to transform into a small sandworm and defends himself before reverting to an innocent one-year-old. Genetically, he is noted to be very unusual; as he grows older, he displays an uncanny intelligence, but is very withdrawn. The current Duncan ghola notes that it had been cruel to bring Leto back without his twin sister, who had been so much of the original's life.

In the concluding novel Sandworms of Dune (2007), Leto (like Sheeana) can control the worms. After his memories are returned, he leads the seven sandworms being transported on the Ithaca to wreak havoc in Synchrony, homeworld of the thinking machines. At the conclusion of the battle, all seven worms fuse together into one massive worm; Leto steps inside, and they descend below the planet's surface. While it is stated that Leto had foreseen the conflict with Omnius and the thinking machines, the ultimate fate of the Golden Path, or the worms' status on Synchrony, is left open.

== In adaptations ==
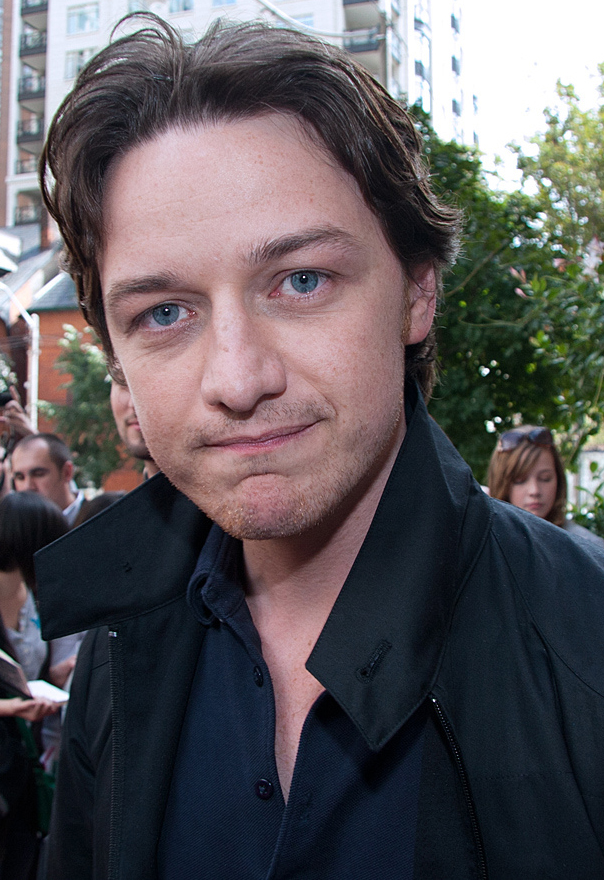
James McAvoy portrays Leto II in the Children of Dune miniseries (2003).

Leto is portrayed by James McAvoy in the 2003 miniseries Frank Herbert's Children of Dune. Laura Fries of Variety wrote, "the mini picks up a great deal of charisma when McAvoy and [Jessica] Brooks [as Ghanima] come aboard as the next generation of the house of Atreides." The characters Leto and Ghanima were aged from ten-year-olds to teens for the miniseries, which Emmet Asher-Perrin of Tor.com called "a smart move here, as finding two ten year old kids who had the ability to behave as though they had millennia of ancestral memory bubbling up inside of them was always going to be an impossibility." Asher-Perrin also called McAvoy "easily one of the highlights of the miniseries, and he plays the part with a sort of brooding-yet-impish etherealness. He's really excellent, and his rapport with Jessica Brooks's Ghanima is dazzling.

God Emperor of Dune is parodied in the animated television show The Grim Adventures of Billy & Mandy in the 2003–04 season episode "Mandy, the Merciless", with Mandy as the emperor Leto II, and Billy as Duncan Idaho.

In 2025, Nakoa-Wolf Momoa was cast as Leto in the Denis Villeneuve film Dune: Part Three.

== Family tree ==
House Atreides family tree

House Atreides
House Harkonnen
House Corrino	Baron Vladimir; Harkonnen	Tanidia Nerus (Note: The Prelude to Dune prequel series (1999–2001) establishes that Tanidia Nerus is an alias of Gaius Helen Mohiam.)
Anirul	Shaddam IV	Leto I Atreides	Lady Jessica (Note: In Dune (1965), Jessica is the concubine of Leto I, and Chani becomes the concubine of their son, Paul.)
Count Dalak; Kenola	Princess Wensicia	Princess Irulan	Paul Atreides	Chani
Josifa	Farad'n	Ghanima Atreides	Leto II Atreides	Leto II Atreides; The Elder (Note: The infant Leto II Atreides is murdered in Dune, and his brother Leto II is later also named after their grandfather, Leto I, in Children of Dune (1976).)	Duncan Idaho
Chalice	Rugi	Many generations (Note: Per God Emperor of Dune, Duncan Idaho gholas was used several times in Leto II's breeding program)	Alia Atreides	Hayt (Note: Hayt is a ghola of Duncan Idaho, a kind of clone made using his corpse.)
Moneo Atreides
Siona Atreides
Many generations
Miles Teg
Darwi Odrade
