= Dune: The Machine Crusade =

2003 science fiction novel by Brian Herbert and Kevin J. Anderson

- First edition cover
- Authors: Brian Herbert; Kevin J. Anderson
- Audio read by: Scott Brick
- Cover artist: Stephen Youll
- Language: English
- Series: Legends of Dune
- Genre: Science fiction
- Publisher: Tor Books
- Publication date: 2003
- Publication place: United States
- Media type: Print (hardback & paperback)
- Pages: 624
- ISBN: 0-7653-0158-X
- OCLC: 52429634
- Dewey Decimal: 813/.54 21
- LC Class: PS3558.E617 D895 2003
- Preceded by: Dune: The Butlerian Jihad
- Followed by: Dune: The Battle of Corrin

Dune: The Machine Crusade is a 2003 science fiction novel by Brian Herbert and Kevin J. Anderson, set in the fictional Dune universe created by Frank Herbert. It is the second book in the Legends of Dune prequel trilogy, which takes place over 10,000 years before the events of Frank Herbert's celebrated 1965 novel Dune. The series chronicles the Butlerian Jihad, a crusade by the last free humans in the universe against the thinking machines, a violent and dominating force led by the sentient computer mind Omnius.

Dune: The Machine Crusade debuted at #7 on The New York Times Best Seller list.

== Plot summary ==
Dune: The Machine Crusade moves forward into the center of the Butlerian Jihad, described in the first book of the trilogy, Dune: The Butlerian Jihad. Leading the movement is the ex-slave and ex-machine trustee Grand Patriarch Iblis Ginjo. However, Iblis appears more interested in politics and his own personal gain than in the Jihad.

Vorian Atreides, despite the long life given to him by his father, the Titan Agamemnon, begins to show the vestiges of wanting to settle down after visiting the planet Caladan, and meeting Leronica Tergiet, who is to become his long-term concubine.

Xavier Harkonnen manages to free Ix from the thinking machines and must eventually make the ultimate sacrifice that will tarnish his name.

The robot Erasmus continues with his enlightening human experimentation, and makes a curious bet with the Omnius entity on Corrin, where he claims he can raise a human being to be orderly and civilized like a machine. This child is Gilbertus Albans, the first true Mentat.

Omnius himself suffers badly from a computer virus created by Vorian and spread unwittingly by his old companion Seurat.

On Ginaz, the aging Zon Noret is killed in a training accident by a mek called Chirox, a captured and reprogrammed fighting machine. Though Noret did not live to pass on his skills to the other Ginaz mercenaries, Chirox remained to train them into the greatest of all mercenaries, the Swordmasters, who will be the ultimate fighting force against the thinking machines.

On the planet of Poritrin, Norma Cenva becomes a successful inventor whose research and inventions on shields and spacefolding technology aids the League's war efforts against the machines. However, her benefactor Tio Holtzman takes credit for her research. Meanwhile, the Zensunni slave Ishmael petitions Duke Niko Bludd for better conditions for the slaves and recognition for their role in constructing a decoy fleet during the successful defense of Poritin. As punishment, he is separated from his wife and daughters and reassigned to Cenva's laboratories. Ishmael's devout religious pacifism clashes with Aliid's militancy, destroying their friendship.

Norma leaves the world just in time to avoid a slave uprising, during which Aliid, unaware of the consequences, fires a lasgun into a Holtzman personal shield. The resulting explosion wipes out Tio Holtzman's labs; the slave revolt is eventually brutally crushed. Ishmael manages to escape offworld with a hundred slaves including his older daughter Chamal and her husband Rafel by forcing the Tlulaxa Tuk Keedair to fly Norma's prototype spacefolding ship to the lonely desert world of Arrakis.

Meanwhile, Norma, due to her heritage as daughter of the main Sorceress of Rossak Zufa Cenva, finally taps into her latent powers under great pressure (precipitated by her capture and subsequent torture by the Titan Xerxes) to become the spearhead of humanity. She envisions a future in which massive ships transport goods and humans instantaneously across the universe, using the Holtzman effect to fold space. Norma's ships are the first of what will later be known as heighliners, and her family uses their monopoly on such travel to found the Spacing Guild.

On Arrakis, Ishmael and his followers struggle to survive on the desert world. They are saved after Keedair alerts the followers of Selim, who are also Zensunni, to their presence. Selim's followers welcome the former Poritrin slaves into their number and the two communities merge to become the Free Men of Arrakis.

Finally, the remaining Titans take their chance becoming independent from their machine master Omnius on the planet of Bela Tegeuse.

== Reception ==
Dune: The Machine Crusade debuted at #7 on The New York Times Best Seller list.
