= Paul of Dune =

2008 novel by Brian Herbert and Kevin J. Anderson

- First edition cover
- Authors: Brian Herbert; Kevin J. Anderson
- Audio read by: Scott Brick
- Language: English
- Series: Heroes of Dune
- Genre: Science fiction
- Publisher: Tor Books
- Publication date: 2008
- Publication place: United States
- Media type: Print (hardcover & paperback)
- Pages: 512
- ISBN: 0-7653-1294-8
- OCLC: 233573359
- Dewey Decimal: 813.54
- LC Class: PS3558.E617 P38 2008
- Followed by: The Winds of Dune

Paul of Dune is a 2008 science fiction novel written by Brian Herbert and Kevin J. Anderson, set in the Dune universe created by Frank Herbert. Released on September 16, 2008, it is the first book in the Heroes of Dune series and chronicles events between Frank Herbert's Dune (1965) and Dune Messiah (1969), as well as between Dune and its 2001 Brian Herbert and Kevin J. Anderson prequel, Dune: House Corrino.

Following the events of Dune, Paul Atreides is in control of the all-important planet Arrakis and therefore the entire universe. Former Padishah Emperor Shaddam IV has been deposed and exiled, but plots to return to power. The Fremen jihad in Paul's name rages as he himself sees to the accuracy of his consort Princess Irulan's chronicle of his life story. Paul flashes back to his memories of the War of Assassins which played out in his youth, before his family relocated to Arrakis in Dune.

== Plot ==
The book is divided into seven sections, which alternate between Paul Atreides's youth before the events portrayed in Dune, and the early period of his Fremen jihad between Dune and Dune Messiah.

=== Paul Atreides's youth ===
Twelve-year-old Paul resides on the planet Caladan with his parents, Duke Leto Atreides and his Bene Gesserit concubine Lady Jessica. House Ecaz of Ecaz and House Moritani of Grumman are embroiled in a generations-long feud, and an Atreides-Ecazi alliance is set to be formalized by Leto's marriage to the Archduke Armand Ecaz's daughter Illesa. At the wedding, Leto and his family escape an assassination attempt, but Armand is injured and Illesa is killed.

Leto and Armand lead a retaliatory attack on Grumman, not realizing that the Moritani forces have been supplemented by troops from House Harkonnen, sworn enemies of the Atreides. The Padishah Emperor's Sardaukar warriors also arrive to prevent full-scale war. Viscount Hundro Moritani has planned this entire offensive as a means to assemble the Ecazi, Atreides, and Imperial forces and annihilate them with a doomsday device; the plot fails as Moritani's Swordmaster Hiih Resser disables the weapon.

=== Muad'Dib's jihad ===
After the fall of Padishah Emperor Shaddam IV and Paul's accession to the Imperial throne, Paul's Fremen forces are engaged on multiple fronts, fighting the Houses that refuse to recognize Atreides rule. The Fremen finally capture Kaitain, the former Imperial capital and home planet of House Corrino. Paul levels Shaddam's fortress, which he hopes will send a message to the other dissident Houses. He invites Whitmore Bludd, a former Swordmaster of House Ecaz and a friend to Paul's former mentor Duncan Idaho, to help him construct on Arrakis the grandest citadel the universe has ever seen. Meanwhile, Earl Thorvald, the nobleman heading the rebel forces, is being chased across the galaxy by Fremen naib Stilgar and Paul's Fedaykin commandos. Elsewhere, Shaddam's former minion the exiled Count Fenring and his Bene Gesserit wife Margot are raising their daughter Marie on Tleilax, training her as a weapon against the Atreides. The savage brutality of the Fremen pushes more noble Houses into alliances with Thorvald. Bludd is executed after trying to assassinate Paul and make his mark in history. Growing more callous and savage as the years pass, Paul ultimately orders the complete annihilation of Thorvald's home planet after he learns that the rebel is planning an attack against Caladan. Marie attempts to assassinate Paul but is killed by Paul's young sister Alia; a distraught Fenring manages to stab Paul mortally. Saved by the deadly Water of Life, Paul arises and banishes the Fenrings to live out their days with Shaddam, whom they now loathe.
