= Dune: House Atreides =

1999 novel by Brian Herbert and Kevin J. Anderson

- First edition cover
- Authors: Brian Herbert; Kevin J. Anderson
- Audio read by: Scott Brick
- Cover artist: Stephen Youll
- Language: English
- Series: Prelude to Dune
- Genre: Science fiction
- Publisher: Spectra
- Publication date: 1999
- Publication place: United States
- Media type: Print (hardcover & paperback)
- Pages: 624
- ISBN: 0-553-11061-6
- OCLC: 40754615
- Dewey Decimal: 813/.54 21
- LC Class: PS3558.E617 D86 1999
- Followed by: Dune: House Harkonnen

Dune: House Atreides is a 1999 science fiction novel by Brian Herbert and Kevin J. Anderson, set in the fictional Dune universe created by Frank Herbert. It is the first book in the Prelude to Dune prequel trilogy, which takes place before the events of Frank Herbert's celebrated 1965 novel Dune. Bantam Books made a $3 million deal for the novels in 1997. The Prelude to Dune novels draw from notes left behind by Frank Herbert before his death.

Dune: House Atreides debuted at #13 on The New York Times Best Seller list, and rose to #12 in its second week of publication.

== Plot summary ==
The novel begins 35 years before the events of the original Dune. Three interconnected narratives revolve around heir-apparent to House Atreides Leto, acting governor of Arrakis Baron Vladimir Harkonnen, and Imperial Crown Prince Shaddam. Side plots involve a young Duncan Idaho escaping enslavement at the hands of House Harkonnen, a young planetologist Pardot Kynes befriending the Fremen native to Arrakis, and the Bene Gesserit's troubles producing a child from the union between the Reverend Mother Gaius Helen Mohiam and Vladimir Harkonnen.

While Leto is studying politics in the court of Earl Dominic Vernius on Ix, a joint Tleilaxu/Sardaukar army suddenly attacks the planet. Leto manages to escape to his homeworld of Caladan with the Earl's children, Rhombur and Kailea. The Tleilaxu conquerors begin using the Ix's technological and industrial resources for "Project Amal" with the goal of creating synthetic melange in order to eliminate dependence upon Arrakis.

Duke Paulus welcomes Leto and the Vernius heirs on Caladan. Lady Helena, however, bitterly opposes protecting the Ixian children. Lady Helena drugs a Salusan bull which then kills the Old Duke at a bullfight one evening. Leto becomes the new Duke and sends his mother away to a monastery. Shortly after, Shaddam's father succumbs to the poison given to him at Shaddam's order years ago, setting Shaddam to become the Padishah Emperor. He invites nobles from across the Imperium to attend his coronation ceremony on Kaitain. The Baron Harkonnen, having invented an invisible ship with the aid of a Richese scientist, has his nephew Glossu Rabban attack Tleilaxu ships, making it look like an attack from the Atreides. Leto opts for a trial before the Landsraad and the Bene Gesserit save him with evidence of Corrino involvement in the Tleilaxu takeover of Ix. Shaddam, wishing to keep Project Amal secret, uses his influence to affect the trial and find Leto innocent.

== Reception ==
Dune: House Atreides debuted at #13 on The New York Times Best Seller list, and rose to #12 in its second week of publication.

Reviewers generally remarked on the book's inferiority in quality compared to those written by the series's original author, with speculation that the younger Herbert and Anderson's efforts might attract new readers to the original books. Gerald Jonas of The New York Times says that readers familiar with the series would enjoy seeing familiar characters and settings, though the book is dialogue-heavy with poor descriptions of action. John Snider of SciFi Dimensions describes Herbert and Anderson's prequels as "pulpy" and "cartoonish" while allowing that they "make [Frank] Herbert's esoteric and philosophical stories more accessible to general audiences." Similarly, Publishers Weekly characterizes the plot of Dune: House Atreides as "intricate" while still being accessible to new readers who might be inspired to turn to the classic books written by the elder Herbert. Likewise, the review of House Atreides from Kirkus Reviews considers the authors' attempt at continuing the Dune saga to have "inventive touches" and devious plotting that would be on par with the complexity of the originals, were they not "less subtle" with "disappointingly lightweight characters" who "make for less powerful drama". The benefit to their work, Kirkus muses, is to promote interest in the original series.

Greg L. Johnson of SF Site praises the authors' choice to focus on side characters from the original Dune that readers are familiar with, though he laments that female characters are not given the time or opportunity to get fleshed out. The practice of heading each chapter with quotations from the original series continues, but Johnson views these quotes as "less clever and thought-provoking" than those of the original series.

At RPGnet, fantasy author Scott Lynch found the book to be a "disappointingly mediocre" and unenlightening contrast to the subtle, competent characters in the original series:

"The places are set, the table is ready, but the meal that is served is ultimately thin and unsatisfying… Where Dune's subtlety was multilayered and mature, the events of this prequel are, at times, depressingly childish. The word 'antics' springs to mind."

== Adaptation ==
In May 2020, Boom! Studios was announced to have acquired the comic and graphic novel rights to Dune: House Atreides, with the intent of doing a 12-issue comic adaptation written by the original authors Brian Herbert and Kevin J. Anderson. It concluded in December 2021.
