= Spacing Guild =

Fictional organization in the Dune franchise

- Dune franchise element
- Mutated Guild Navigator suspended in a tank filled with spice gas, accompanied by Guild agents, as depicted in the David Lynch film Dune (1984).
- First appearance: Dune; 1965
- Created by: Frank Herbert
- Genre: Science fiction

In-universe information
- Type: Organization
- Function: Controls a monopoly on space travel and banking

The Spacing Guild is an organization in Frank Herbert's science fiction Dune universe that possesses a monopoly on interstellar travel and banking. Guild Navigators (alternately Guildsmen or Steersmen) (Note: Frank Herbert refers to the Navigators alternately as "Guild Steersmen" beginning with Dune Messiah (1969). It may also be noted that starting in Dune (1965), Herbert uses the term "Guildsman" alternately for both Navigators and Guild agents.) use the drug melange (also called "the spice") to achieve limited prescience, a form of precognition that allows them to successfully navigate "folded space" and safely guide enormous starships called heighliners across interstellar space instantaneously.

The power of the Guild is balanced against that of the Padishah Emperor as well as of the assembled noble Houses of the Landsraad. Essentially apolitical, the Guild is primarily concerned with the flow of commerce and preservation of the economy that supports them. Although their ability to dictate the terms of and fees for all transport gives them influence in the political arena, they do not pursue political goals beyond their economic ones.

== Overview ==
In the Dune series, enormous starships called heighliners employ a scientific phenomenon known as the Holtzman effect to "fold space" and thereby travel great distances across the universe instantaneously. Navigators are able to use a limited form of prescience to safely navigate interstellar space. Navigators are humans who mutated through the consumption of and exposure to massive amounts of the drug melange, also known as the spice. Control of these Navigators gives the Spacing Guild its monopoly on interstellar travel and banking, making the organization a balance of power against the Padishah Emperor and the assembled noble Houses of the Landsraad. In the 1965 novel Dune, Paul Atreides seizes control of the desert planet Arrakis, only known source of the spice, turning the Guild's reliance on the spice into leverage over them. Paul demands that Emperor Shaddam IV relinquish the Imperial throne to him, but looks to the Spacing Guild agents present for the answer. Paul's ability to threaten, or destroy, the flow of spice has rendered Shaddam powerless, and the Guild forces him to capitulate.

=== Navigators ===
Edrik in his spice tank, as depicted on the cover of Hunters of Dune (2006)

To enable their prescience, Guild Navigators not only consume large quantities of the spice, but are also continuously immersed in highly concentrated amounts of orange spice gas. This level of extreme and extended exposure causes their bodies to atrophy and mutate over time, their heads and extremities elongating, and causing them to become vaguely aquatic in appearance. The first external sign of melange-induced metabolic change is visible in the eyes, as the drug tints the sclera and iris to a dark shade of blue, called "blue-in-blue" or "the Eyes of Ibad," which is "a total blue so dark as to be almost black." This is a common side effect in all spice addicts.

In Dune, Duke Leto Atreides notes that the Guild is "as jealous of its privacy as it is of its monopoly," and that not even their own agents ever see Navigators. Leto's son Paul wonders if they are mutated to the point of no longer appearing human. At the end of the novel, two self-identified Guild Navigators accompanying Emperor Shaddam IV are described as "fat", but not otherwise non-human. The Guild Navigator Edric, introduced in the first chapter of Dune Messiah (1969), is called a "humanoid fish," and described in his tank of spice gas as "an elongated figure, vaguely humanoid with finned feet and hugely fanned membranous hands—a fish in a strange sea." The Navigators' "elongated and repositioned limbs and organs" are noted in Heretics of Dune. In 1985's Chapterhouse: Dune, Lucilla notes that "Navigators were forever bathed in the orange gas of melange, their features often fogged by the vapors," that they possess a "tiny v of a mouth" and "ugly flap of nose" and that "mouth and nose appeared small on a Navigator's gigantic face with its pulsing temples." She also notes that their mutated voices require translation devices, describing "the singsong ululations of the Navigator's voice with its simultaneous mechtranslation into impersonal Galach."

In an unused passage by Frank Herbert from Dune Messiah published in The Road to Dune (2005), Edric is described as surviving without spice gas once a hole is opened in his tank, though his prescient abilities are practically useless in this state.

== Plotlines ==
=== Original series ===
==== Dune ====
In Dune (1965), the Spacing Guild enjoys a profitable monopoly on interstellar travel and commerce. Though powerful, the Spacing Guild has never actively tried to openly seize power over all of humanity and rule directly, instead sharing power with the Emperor and the Great Houses, and influencing events from the shadows. Paul Atreides concludes that the Guild does this out of a belief that any political empire is finite, ending sooner or later. The only way to guarantee their continual existence is to be a "parasite", propping up one imperial dynasty until it collapses, then simply switching to support the next one. At the end of the novel, Paul deposes Padishah Emperor Shaddam IV by seizing control of Arrakis, the only source of the all-important drug melange. Paul has learned the extent of the Guild's dependence on spice, and that without it they are "blind" and unable to navigate interstellar travel. The Guild is forced to side with Paul, threatening to strand the Emperor and his troops on Arrakis if he does not relinquish the throne.

In 'Appendix A' of Dune, Herbert wrote that the Guild, along with the Bene Gesserit order, had been responsible for the standardization of religion in the universe by promoting the adoption of the Orange Catholic Bible and offering protection to the dissenting theologians who created this book. Nonetheless, in the same appendix, Herbert held that the Guild members themselves were atheists, and only promoted this move to promote a stable societal order from which they could profit. Houses of the Imperium may contract with the Guild to be removed "to a place of safety outside the System". Some Houses in danger of ruin or defeat have "become renegade Houses, taking family atomics and shields and fleeing beyond the Imperium". The Guild controls a "sanctuary planet" (or planets) known as Tupile, intended for such "defeated Houses of the Imperium ... Location(s) known only to the Guild and maintained inviolate under the Guild Peace".

==== Dune Messiah ====
In Dune Messiah (1969), the Navigator Edric engages in a conspiracy to dethrone Emperor Paul Atreides, joined by the Tleilaxu Face Dancer Scytale, the Bene Gesserit Reverend Mother Gaius Helen Mohiam, and Paul's embittered consort, Princess Irulan of House Corrino. With their endless need for melange, the Spacing Guild has a vested interest in breaking Paul's stranglehold over the spice supply. Edric's involvement also protects the conspirators from discovery, as his prescience hides the activities of himself and those around him from other prescients, like Paul. The plot ultimately fails, and Edric and Mohiam are executed by Fremen naib Stilgar on orders from Paul's sister Alia Atreides.

In Chapterhouse Dune (1985), a "very powerful" Navigator is described as "one of the Edrics", suggesting a possible breeding plan or use of gholas.

==== God Emperor of Dune ====
In God Emperor of Dune (1981), God Emperor Leto II has secured complete control over of the scarce melange reserves through hydraulic despotism, making the Guild completely dependent on him. He also notes in the novel that though history has attributed the design of the first Guild ship to Aurelius Venport, it was actually Venport's mistress Norma Cenva who designed it.

==== Heretics of Dune and Chapterhouse: Dune ====
The fifth and sixth novels of the series, Heretics of Dune (1984) and Chapterhouse: Dune (1985), are set 5,000 years after the reign of Paul Atreides, a period that includes 3,500 years of Leto II's reign and 1,500 years following his death. The warlike Honored Matres have seized control of Junction, the old Spacing Guild complex above Gammu. The technocrats of Ix develop technology that the Ixians and the Administrative faction of the Spacing Guild refer to as "compilers". These compilers perform calculations very similar to computers, nearly violating the prohibitions against "thinking machines" that were imposed following the Butlerian Jihad several millennia before. These compilers eliminate the need for the Navigators, and the strategic disadvantage that this aspect of melange dependency has become, because the Navigators' abilities are slowly being compromised by the severe reductions in the availability of spice resulting from the destruction of Dune and the sandworms on that planet, and the strict control by the Bene Gesserit, who maintain a monopoly over the largest stockpiles of melange. The prescient rule of Leto II that lasted 3,500 years has shown the universe the perils of prescience, namely that the entire universe can be locked into the vision of a single entity, giving that entity absolute power. The Guild, facing obsolescence and suspicion, couples itself with Ix in decline; Navigators continue to exist, but their importance in the universe is severely diminished. As Paul Atreides notes in Dune, it was the Spacing Guild's obsession with the "safe path" that led them "ever into stagnation", and brought on their eventual obsolescence.

=== Sequels ===
After publishing six Dune prequel novels, Frank Herbert's son Brian Herbert and author Kevin J. Anderson released two sequel novels, Hunters of Dune (2006) and Sandworms of Dune (2007), which complete the original series and wrap up storylines that began with Frank Herbert's Heretics of Dune. The works were based on a 30-page outline by Frank Herbert for a sequel to Chapterhouse Dune he dubbed Dune 7.

In Hunters of Dune, the Navigator Edrik fears his kind's obsolescence when the Spacing Guild itself (pressured by a shortage of melange) begins funding the development of superior Ixian navigation technology that would not require Navigators. Seeking an alternative source of spice to break the Bene Gesserit monopoly, Edrik meets with Uxtal, the last of the Lost Tleilaxu, hoping that he can rediscover the method of producing melange in axlotl tanks (a secret believed lost when the Bene Tleilax were destroyed by the Honored Matres). However, Uxtal is in the forced service of the Matre Superior Hellica, and her price for his expertise is Edrik's help transporting a certain cargo. He agrees, delivering by heighliner the Obliterators that destroy the planet Richese, where the Bene Gesserit are mass-producing weapons and armed battleships. Uxtal is ultimately unsuccessful, but the ghola he creates of deceased Tleilaxu Master Waff later offers Edrik something better in exchange for sanctuary—the genetic knowledge for the Guild to create their own, optimized sandworms to produce melange.

In Sandworms of Dune (2007), the sequel to Hunters and finale of the original Dune series, the Spacing Guild has begun replacing its Navigators with the more cost-effective Ixian navigation devices and cutting off the Navigators' supply of melange. More and more Navigators are dying from withdrawal of the spice—including Ardrae, "one of the oldest remaining Navigators"—and many defect and disappear into space rather than allow the devices on their ships. All are unaware that Face Dancer infiltrators are behind the plan, plotting their own takeover of the universe. Waff works in secret, hidden on Edrik's own heighliner, on genetically engineering his "advanced" sandworms. He accomplishes this by altering the DNA of the sandtrout stage and creating an aquatic form of the worms, which are then released into the oceans of Buzzell. Adapting to their new environment, these "seaworms" quickly flourish, eventually producing a highly concentrated form of spice, dubbed "ultraspice." Edrik and the ultraspice are later intercepted by Face Dancer leader Khrone, who seizes the valuable optimized melange. He incapacitates Edrik by damaging his tank and releasing its spice gas, soon destroying the entire heighliner to rid himself of the Navigator altogether.

=== Prequels ===
The Prelude to Dune prequel trilogy (1999–2001) by Brian Herbert and Anderson, set immediately before the events of Dune, explores the previously unexplained process of becoming a Navigator through the story of D'murr Pilru. D'murr, a human native of the technology-producing planet Ix, goes through the training process and physical transformation to become a full Navigator. In House Corrino (2001), D'murr is piloting one of two heighliners which Count Fenring uses to secretly test the synthetic melange created by the Tleilaxu in their Project Amal. The flawed spice disrupts and confuses D'murr's thoughts, feelings and prescience. Disastrously, the first heighliner emerges from foldspace at the wrong point, striking the defensive shields of Wallach IX and plummeting into the atmosphere to its destruction. Affected by the tainted melange, D'murr misguides his ship out of the known universe and collapses. As his spice supply is replaced with genuine melange, D'murr uses the last of his strength to return the ship safely to Junction, home of the Guild headquarters, before dying.

In the Legends of Dune prequel trilogy (2002–2004) by Brian Herbert and Anderson, unappreciated scientist Norma Cenva creates the Holtzman engine, which allows a ship to fold space, traveling great distances instantaneously. Her future husband, entrepreneur Aurelius Venport, begins mass-producing the ships which are eventually known as heighliners. The technique proves to be unsafe, however, as one in ten flights ends in the ship's destruction due to navigational difficulties. Desperate for a solution, Norma consumes increasing amounts of melange to improve her thinking and concentration. Full immersion in a tank of spice gas deforms her body, but ultimately bestows on her the prescient ability to plot a safe path for a heighliner through foldspace. As the first Navigator, Norma begins a training program to produce enough Navigators to pilot a fleet of heighliners. Over 80 years later, she puts the creation of the Spacing Guild in motion through her descendant, Josef Venport.

After consolidating its hold on the space travel industry during the events of Sisterhood of Dune (2012), this company, now called Venport Holdings or VenHold, evolves into the Guild of the later novels. VenHold originally has the monopoly on foldspace travel, granted to Aurelius Venport by Serena Butler. However, decades after the end of the Butlerian Jihad, Emperor Jules revokes the monopoly in order to curry political favor, resulting in several rival foldspace companies springing up, such as Celestial Transport and EsconTran. These new companies, however, are unable to provide 100% safe transportation due to their lack of Navigators, the creation process of whom is a proprietary secret tightly held by VenHold. Director Josef Venport ruthlessly crushes the competition and even executes a rival CEO. Josef's desire to restore his family's monopoly and thirst for knowledge put him in conflict with the Butlerians, a radical religious sect that follows the teachings of the late Rayna Butler under the leadership of Manford Torondo. Realizing that the weak Emperor Salvador Corrino is unwilling to crush the Butlerians, Venport lures him out to Arrakis and has him eaten by a sandworm. Unfortunately for him, Salvador's sabotaged ship manages to return to Salusa Secundus and report the truth to the newly crowned emperor Roderick, Salvador's brother. Roderick swears vengeance on Venport. Just then, Torondo gets his hands on a cache of atomics, which he uses to obliterate VenHold's main planet. Eventually, imperial forces track down Venport's secret laboratory and invade. Norma offers Josef a chance to survive by becoming a Navigator. She then folds space to the bridge of the imperial flagship and strikes a deal with the Emperor, agreeing to dissolve VenHold in exchange for Roderick sparing her and all her Navigators, and also establishing the Spacing Guild.

== Depictions ==
=== Film and television ===
In David Lynch's 1984 film Dune, the Navigator's mutation affects his entire body, and he resembles a giant newt or worm with a heavily deformed head, V-shaped mouth and vestigial limbs. The 2000 miniseries Frank Herbert's Dune portrays the Navigator as a withered figure with a humanoid head, blue-in-blue eyes and arms which have mutated into wings with elongated webbed fingers. The 2003 sequel miniseries Frank Herbert's Children of Dune presents Edric as a sleek, golden humanoid with an elongated head and limbs, and feathery appendages. Though Navigators are not present in Denis Villeneuve's 2021 film Dune, Guild representatives are depicted as humanoids in white, cloaked space suits with opaque helmet visors. Villeneuve explained:

We don't see the Navigators in this first part... I tried to keep all the space-travelling as mysterious as possible, like almost bringing some kind of mysticism or sacred relationship with that part of the movie. Everything involving space is just evocated and very mysterious.

Writing for Screen Rant, Adam Felman opined that the limited inclusion of the Guild in Villeneuve's film helped prevent the story from becoming convoluted.

=== Games ===
The Spacing Guild is a sub-faction in the real-time strategy video game Emperor: Battle for Dune (2001). It has its own private army with which it can back up its demands. The Guild uses its heighliners to transport troops of the three player Houses (Atreides, Harkonnen and Ordos) from their homeworlds to Arrakis. The Guild also uses its Navigators to pilot their NIAB ("Navigator in a Boat") Tanks, a hover tank that projects a single electrical bolt, and NIAP ("Navigators in a Plane") Flyers, an aerial version of the NIAB Tank, although without any weapons of its own. The NIAB Tank also has the ability to fold-space for short distances on the battlefield. One mission in the game involves the three House attacking each other on a Guild heighliner. The Guild forces in the game can also deploy a unit called the Maker, an infantry unit somewhat resembling both a Navigator and a small sandworm, armed with an electrical weapon. Later in the game, the Spacing Guild attempts to seize control of the universe by building an "Emperor Worm".

== Analysis ==
In Herbert's series, the Spacing Guild's exclusive control of interstellar travel effectively grants them unrivaled power over the Emperor, the other noble houses and the economy of the Imperium itself. Paul is able to disrupt this power dynamic by seizing control of spice production on Arrakis and threatening to destroy it. The Guild, and by extension the Emperor, are forced to accept Paul's power over them and capitulate to his demands. This shift allows Paul to further dismantle the existing bureaucratic structures and replace the Emperor's Sardaukar forces with his own Fremen warriors, fundamentally transforming the political landscape of the Imperium.

Herbert depicts the historical relationship between the Guild and the Imperium as fundamentally symbiotic, and makes both reliant in one way or another on the spice, a metaphor for the finite resource of oil. He employs the concept of hydraulic despotism, describing it in God Emperor of Dune as "when a substance or condition upon which life in general absolutely depends can be controlled by a relatively small and centralized force."

John C. Smith analyzes the concept of the Guild in the essay "Navigators and the Spacing Guild" in The Science of Dune (2008).
