= Dune: The Butlerian Jihad =

2002 science fiction novel by Brian Herbert and Kevin J. Anderson

- First edition cover
- Authors: Brian Herbert; Kevin J. Anderson
- Audio read by: Scott Brick
- Cover artist: Stephen Youll
- Language: English
- Series: Legends of Dune
- Genre: Science fiction
- Publisher: Tor Books
- Publication date: 2002
- Publication place: United States
- Media type: Print (hardback & paperback)
- Pages: 624
- ISBN: 0-7653-0157-1
- OCLC: 50192212
- Dewey Decimal: 813/.54 21
- LC Class: PS3558.E617 D89 2003
- Followed by: Dune: The Machine Crusade

Dune: The Butlerian Jihad is a 2002 science fiction novel by Brian Herbert and Kevin J. Anderson, set in the fictional Dune universe created by Frank Herbert. It is the first book in the Legends of Dune prequel trilogy, which takes place over 10,000 years before the events of Frank Herbert's celebrated 1965 novel Dune. The series chronicles the fictional Butlerian Jihad, a crusade by the last free humans in the universe against the thinking machines, a violent and dominating force led by the sentient computer Omnius.

Dune: The Butlerian Jihad rose to #7 on The New York Times Best Seller list in its second week of publication.

== Plot summary ==
The novel introduces a generation of characters whose families will later become the most significant in the universe: the Atreides, the Corrinos and the Harkonnens. Serena Butler, daughter of the viceroy of the League of Nobles, is a strong voice for the human rebellion. Her paramour Xavier Harkonnen leads the military force on the current League capital world of Salusa Secundus. As the story begins, Xavier is repelling an attack on the planet by Omnius' army of cymeks. The cymeks are former humans whose brains have been implanted in preservation canisters, which in turn can be installed into a variety of fearsome mechanical bodies, to extend their lives indefinitely and make them nearly unstoppable. The original twenty cymeks (calling themselves the Titans) had conquered the complacent universe by exploiting humanity's reliance and dependency on machines, yet the Titans were later overthrown themselves by Omnius, an artificial intelligence of their design. Seeking to replace human chaos with machine order, Omnius thus ignited the war between machine and humanity. Vorian Atreides is the son and subordinate of the leading cymek Titan Agamemnon (whose last name, Atreides, originates with House Atreus, from the ancient Greek epic the Iliad).

Meanwhile, the Sorceresses of Rossak, a matriarchal order, are perfecting their destructive psychic powers for use against the machines and maintaining a breeding program to create more powerful telepaths. Pharmaceutical magnate Aurelius Venport is about to discover an interesting new substance, the spice melange, and the famous inventor Tio Holtzman accepts the diminutive genius Norma Cenva into his employ.

Serena is captured by the Titan Barbarossa and put under the watch of Erasmus, an independent robot who seeks to understand humans completely so that the thinking machines may be truly superior. His methods of study often entail human vivisection and torture in his slave pens. Erasmus takes a liking to Serena, as does the young Vorian. Serena realizes she is pregnant with Xavier's child and later gives birth to a baby boy whom she names Manion (after her father). Erasmus finds this distraction inconvenient, and subsequently removes Serena's uterus and kills her young son in front of her.

This single event incites the entire Jihad, and young Manion is soon labelled the first martyr, Manion the Innocent. Vorian, learning about the murder and realizing the lie he lives as a machine trustee, betrays his machine masters and flees with Serena. They are joined by another trustee, Iblis Ginjo, a slave leader who masterminds the rebellion on Synchronized Earth.

The first human victory of the so-called Butlerian Jihad is the destruction of Earth and the Earth Omnius using atomics. Iblis (now Grand Patriarch of the Holy Jihad) and Serena (Priestess of the Jihad) are the religious leaders of the human rebellion, and Xavier and Vorian its two generals. The brutal Titans are desperate to break free of their machine masters and wage their own techno-misanthropic war, and Omnius and Erasmus are determined to conquer and destroy all of humanity once and for all.

A subplot of the novel focuses on the Zensunni slave Ishmael who is captured by slavers and taken to Poritrin. He and a Zenshiite slave named Aliid attempt to sabotage one of Holtzmann's experiments. The two are influenced by the charismatic slave leader Bel Moulay, who inspires a slave uprising. Lord Niko Bludd's Dragoons suppress the revolt. While the slaves receive an amnesty due to the pressing war with Omnius, Moulay is mutilated and executed.

And on a lonely desert planet known as Arrakis, the seeds of legend are sown with Selim Wormrider, an outcast from his tribe, who sees the future of Shai-Hulud and makes it his mission to save his god from those who would wish to take the spice.

== Characters ==
- Serena Butler (221–164 B.G.), an ambitious and intelligent woman from Salusa Secundus and a strong voice for the human rebellion. She is the daughter of League of Nobles Viceroy Manion Butler and is romantically involved with Xavier Harkonnen, the leader of human forces on Salusa Secundus. Captured by the machines, the pregnant Serena is put under the watch of the thinking machine Erasmus, who kills Serena's child from Xavier, Manion Butler Jr. This incites the rebellion of human slaves and eventually the Jihad against the machines. Serena, as Priestess of the Jihad, becomes one of the religious leaders of the human rebellion. Upon her father's retirement, she became interim Viceroy, but was later relegated to a figurehead by Patriarch Iblis Ginjo. She eventually travels to Corrin, ostensibly to negotiate a peace but actually to provoke Omnius into martyring her and thus motivating war-weary humans to fight the Jihad until a victorious end. In 108 B.G., Serena posthumously becomes the focal point of the fanatically anti-technological Cult of Serena, founded by her great-grandniece, Rayna.
- Xavier Harkonnen (223–154 B.G.) is a young military officer leading the defense against the cymek attack against Salusa Secundus. Xavier courts Serena Butler and fathers her son, Manion, but after she is abducted (and presumed dead), he marries Serena's sister Octa. Through this union, Xavier becomes the ancestor of both House Corrino and House Harkonnen. In the Jihad, he serves as a Primero (general) alongside Vorian Atreides, who turns from a rival for Serena Butler's love into a good friend. Upon Xavier's suggestion, Omnius's primary stronghold on Earth is destroyed with a massive nuclear strike. Later on, finding out about Iblis Ginjo's organ raids, Xavier takes control of Ginjo's spacecraft and flies it directly into the Tlulaxa sun Thalim, carrying Iblis Ginjo to his death. In the process, Xavier not only sacrifices his life but also his reputation as the public, ignorant of Ginjo's corruption, regards the latter as a martyr while Xavier is marked as a traitor. Most of Xavier's descendants afterwards shun the name of Harkonnen in favour of Butler.
- Vorian Atreides – the human co-pilot of the Dream Voyager
- Iblis Ginjo (234?–164 B.G.) – a charismatic human work leader on Earth
- Erasmus – an independent thinking machine
- Agamemnon – the general of the cymeks, one of the Twenty Titans, and Vorian's father
- Norma Cenva – a dwarf and mathematical genius from Rossak
- Tio Holtzman – a genius inventor on Poritrin
- Selim – a young exile on Arrakis
- Zufa Cenva – a powerful Sorceress of Rossak and Norma Cenva's mother
- Ishmael – a young Zensunni slave taken from Harmonthep
- Aurelius Venport – a Rossak businessman and Zufa Cenva's mate
- Omnius – the computer evermind that controls all thinking machines
- Bel Moulay – a Zenshiite religious leader and slave taken from IV Anbus
- Tuk Keedair – a Tlulaxa slaver and flesh merchant
- Niko Bludd – the Lord of Poritrin
- Brigit Paterson – an engineer on Serena Butler's commando team
- Ajax – the most brutal of the Twenty Titans
- Juno – a cymek female, one of the Twenty Titans, and Agamemnon's lover
- Manion Butler – the Viceroy of the League of Nobles and Serena Butler's father
- Heoma – a powerful Sorceress of Rossak and one of Zufa Cenva's trainees
- Dhartha – the naib of a Zensunni tribe on Arrakis
- Seurat – the thinking machine captain of the Dream Voyager
- Mahmad – Dhartha's son
- Xerxes – the Titan responsible for Omnius' takeover
- Camio – a Sorceress of Rossak and one of Zufa Cenva's trainees
- Aliid – a young Zenshiite slave on Poritrin
- Eklo – a Cogitor of Earth
- Aquim – one of Eklo's secondaries

== Reception ==
Dune: The Butlerian Jihad rose to #7 on The New York Times Best Seller list in its second week of publication.
