= Feyd-Rautha =

Dune character

Feyd-Rautha Harkonnen
- Dune character
- Feyd-Rautha Harkonnen as portrayed by Sting in the 1984 film Dune
- First appearance: Dune (1963–65)
- Last appearance: Dune: Part Two (2024)
- Created by: Frank Herbert
- Portrayed by: Sting (1984 film); Matt Keeslar (2000 series); Austin Butler (2024 film)
- Voiced by: Piotr Michael (Dune Awakening)

In-universe information
- Title: na-Baron
- Affiliation: House Harkonnen
- Children: Prequels: Marie Fenring
- Relatives: Abulurd Harkonnen II (father); Emmi Rabban (mother); Glossu Rabban (brother); Baron Vladimir Harkonnen (uncle)

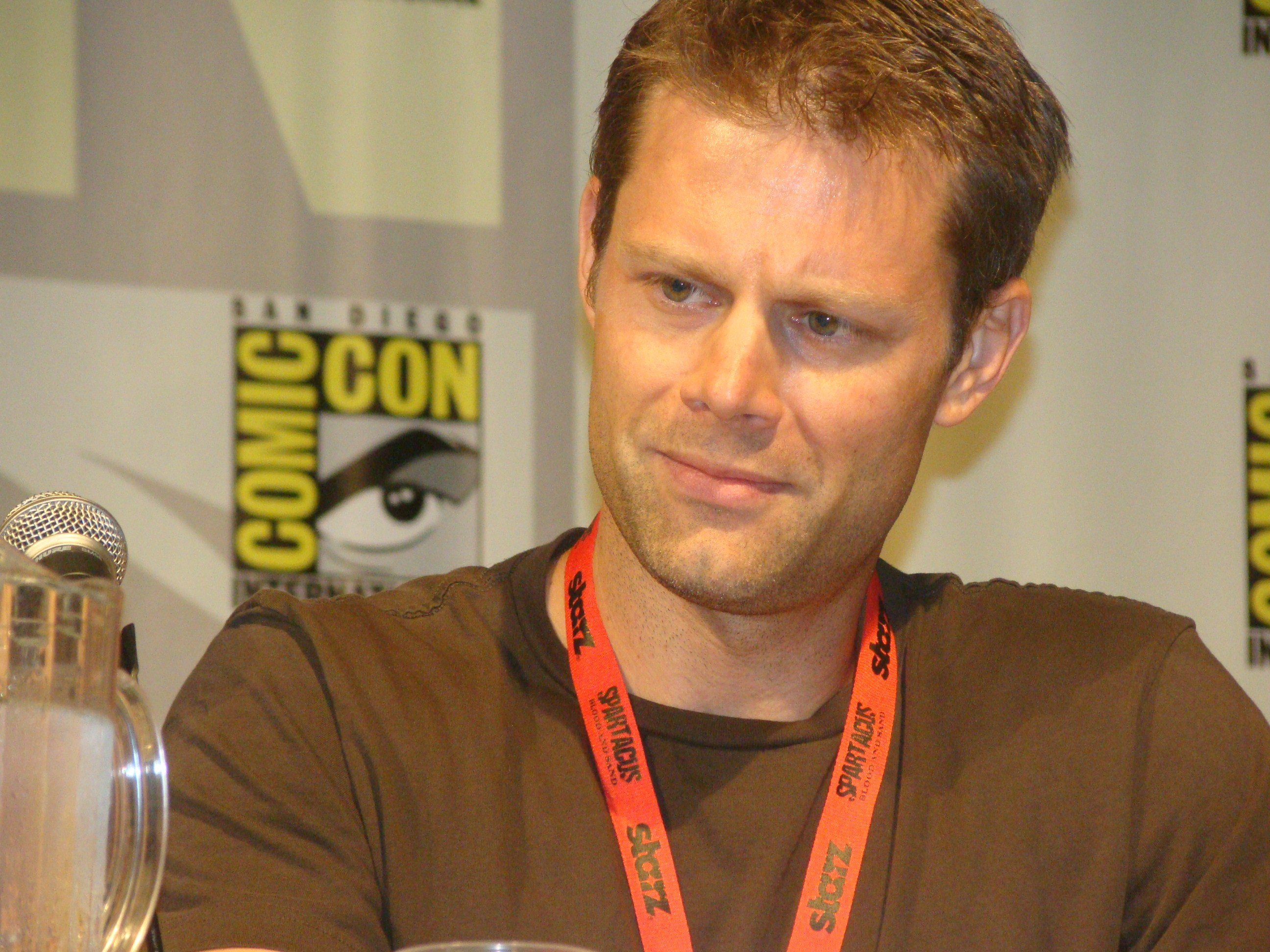
Matt Keeslar plays Feyd in the 2000 Dune miniseries.

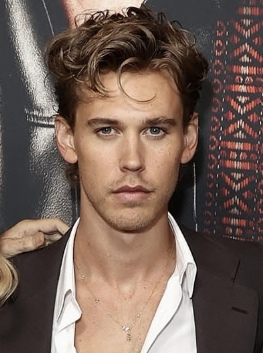
Austin Butler portrays Feyd-Rautha in the 2024 film Dune: Part Two.

Feyd-Rautha Harkonnen is a fictional character in the 1965 science fiction novel Dune by Frank Herbert. He is the younger nephew and heir of the Baron Vladimir Harkonnen, and is depicted as being cruel, treacherous and cunning, though less so than his uncle.

Feyd is portrayed by Sting in the 1984 film Dune, by Matt Keeslar in the 2000 miniseries Frank Herbert's Dune, and by Austin Butler in the 2024 film Dune: Part Two.

== Description ==
Sixteen-year-old Feyd, the younger nephew and heir of Baron Harkonnen, is described as dark haired, and "round of face and with sullen eyes". He is lean and muscular in contrast to his morbidly obese uncle, and is a deadly fighter. The Baron also notes that the "full and pouting look" of Feyd's lips is "the Harkonnen genetic marker". Feyd and his elder brother Glossu Rabban are the legal sons of Baron Harkonnen's youngest half-brother, Abulurd Rabban, who had "renounced the Harkonnen name and all rights to the title when given the subdistrict governorship of Rabban-Lankiveil".

The character Feyd serves as a narrative foil to Paul Atreides, son of the Baron's enemy, Duke Leto Atreides. Ari Szporn of Comic Book Resources wrote, "Both [Paul and Feyd] are charismatic, cunning young noblemen who have received the greatest education and combat training. But where Paul displays compassion and loyalty, Feyd cares only for himself and the acquisition of power."

== Appearances ==
=== Dune ===
As Dune begins, Feyd-Rautha figures heavily in the Baron's plans to gain power for House Harkonnen. The Baron favors the handsome and charismatic Feyd over Feyd's older brother Glossu Rabban ("The Beast") because of Feyd's intelligence and his dedication to the Harkonnen culture of carefully planned and subtly executed sadism and cruelty, as opposed to Rabban's outright brutality.

The Baron could see the path ahead of him. One day, a Harkonnen would be Emperor. Not himself, and no spawn of his loins. But a Harkonnen. Not this Rabban he'd summoned, of course. But Rabban's younger brother, young Feyd-Rautha. There was a sharpness to the boy that the Baron enjoyed ... a ferocity ... A year or two more — say, by the time he's seventeen, I'll know for certain whether he's the tool that House Harkonnen requires to gain the throne.

Feyd is, for a while, the Baron's heir, or na-Baron. To assure Feyd's power, the Baron intends to install him as ruler of Arrakis after a period of tyrannical misrule by Rabban, making Feyd appear to be the savior of the people.

Feyd, like Paul Atreides, is also the product of a centuries-long breeding program organized by the Bene Gesserit, who planned their own alliance by joining a Harkonnen son to an Atreides daughter with the expectation that their offspring would have a high probability of being their hoped-for Kwisatz Haderach. For this reason, Lady Jessica's decision to defy the Sisterhood and to produce an Atreides son, Paul, threw the Bene Gesserit's plans into turmoil and established an irreconcilable tension between Feyd and Paul as the scions of their bitterly opposed noble houses. The risk of one or both of these young men being killed, destroying thousands of years of genetic engineering, is so great that the Bene Gesserit send an envoy, Margot Fenring, to seduce Feyd and conceive a child, salvaging his genetic material.

Margot also intends to "plant deep in his deepest self the necessary prana-bindu phrases to bend him," which she later refers to as the "hypno-ligation of that Feyd-Rautha's psyche." Presumably he is thus "prepared" and made vulnerable to a command which will cause complete muscle paralysis, a technique the Bene Gesserit sometimes use on individuals who are considered highly dangerous. It is also later noted by the Reverend Mother Mohiam that Feyd's encounter with Lady Fenring produced a daughter.

Feyd's ambition and impatience to inherit the Baron's title and power spur him to attempt his uncle's assassination. The attempt fails, prompting the Baron to reveal to his nephew the lofty plans he has for him, possibly to even have him ascend the throne as Emperor. The Baron explains that the elevation of House Harkonnen means more to him than power in his own lifetime, so if Feyd promises to forego any further assassination attempts, he will voluntarily step down and let his nephew succeed him—after his plot against the Emperor has succeeded. Feyd agrees, but as punishment for his assassination attempt, the Baron forces Feyd to single-handedly slaughter all the female slaves who serve as his lovers so that Feyd will learn the price of failure.

As Paul makes his final bid to usurp the Padishah Emperor's power, he is challenged by Feyd, the current Harkonnen leader after the deaths of the Baron and Rabban. Though famed for his prowess in single combat, Feyd intends to guarantee victory by breaking the formal rules of kanly (which govern this type of challenge) and using a hidden poison spur in his fighting outfit. He nearly succeeds in killing Paul in the ritualized fight, as Paul struggles with whether to try the paralysis word-sound given to him by his mother, and owe the Bene Gesserit his victory, or to risk his life against Feyd in a "fair" fight. Paul manages to defeat Feyd without the command, killing him, and goes on to accede to the throne of the Emperor.

=== Prelude to Dune ===
In the Prelude to Dune prequel trilogy by Brian Herbert and Kevin J. Anderson, it is established that Feyd had been born on the Harkonnen planet Lankiveil as the second son of Vladimir's younger half-brother Abulurd Harkonnen and his wife Emmi. The Bene Gesserit, desiring a son by Abulurd for their breeding program but finding Glossu unacceptable, secretly administer fertility drugs to an aging Emmi, who soon conceives Feyd.

Named after his maternal grandfather, Rautha Rabban, who had been murdered by Glossu, Feyd becomes honorable Abulurd's hope for a son who would not have to inherit the dishonor of the name Harkonnen, and a worthy heir in comparison to his older, murderous son, Glossu. The Baron decides to take the infant Feyd from his father to raise on the Harkonnen homeworld Giedi Prime as another possible heir for himself, and as punishment for Abulurd's attempts to sever all his ties to House Harkonnen. In time, the Baron comes to favor Feyd over Glossu.

=== Sandworms of Dune ===
In Sandworms of Dune (2007), the second of Brian Herbert and Kevin J. Anderson's two-part finale to the original Dune series, a ghola of Paul Atreides is created over 5,000 years after the original's death. Once his memories are restored, Paul recalls that after his ascension to the Imperial throne (between the novels Dune and 1969's Dune Messiah) he "had not been able to escape political struggles, assassination attempts, the exiled Emperor Shaddam's bid for power and the pretender daughter of Feyd-Rautha and Lady Fenring ..."

== In adaptations ==
Director Alejandro Jodorowsky intended Mick Jagger to play Feyd in his planned 1970s film adaptation of Dune, which was never made.

Feyd is portrayed by Sting in the 1984 David Lynch film Dune, Brigid Brown of BBC America called Sting a "scene-stealer" in the film.

Matt Keeslar played the character in the 2000 miniseries Frank Herbert's Dune. Emmet Asher-Perrin of Tor.com called his portrayal "the strangest casting choice you've ever seen," adding that "it's also hard not to love the strangeness of it."

Feyd does not appear in the 2021 film Dune, which covers the first part of the book, but director Denis Villeneuve subsequently confirmed that the character would appear in the 2024 sequel film Dune: Part Two. Austin Butler entered negotiations to join the cast as Feyd in March 2022, and his casting was confirmed in May 2022. Butler has been praised for the role, and Brooks Vernon of Screen Rant wrote, "The performance was memorably psychotic, and there is a high level of physicality and charisma in it that helps Austin Butler play well onscreen against Timothée Chalamet [as Paul Atreides]."

Feyd, based on his appearance in Dune: Part Two, appears alongside Paul Atreides as a playable character in Call of Duty: Modern Warfare III and Call of Duty: Warzone 2.0.

== Merchandising ==
A line of Dune action figures from toy company LJN was released to lackluster sales in 1984. Styled after David Lynch's film, the collection featured a figure of Feyd as well as other characters. In October 2019, Funko announced a "Dune Classic" line of POP! vinyl figures, one of which was Feyd in a blue jumpsuit, styled after Lynch's film. An alternate version of Feyd in his blue loincloth was released for the 2019 New York Comic Con.
