= The Winds of Dune =

2009 novel by Brian Herbert and Kevin J. Anderson

- First edition cover
- Authors: Brian Herbert; Kevin J. Anderson
- Audio read by: Scott Brick
- Language: English
- Series: Heroes of Dune
- Genre: Science fiction
- Publisher: Tor Books
- Publication date: August 4, 2009
- Publication place: United States
- Media type: Print (hardback & paperback)
- Pages: 448
- ISBN: 0-7653-2272-2
- OCLC: 294887445
- Preceded by: Paul of Dune
- Followed by: Princess of Dune

The Winds of Dune is a science fiction novel written by Brian Herbert and Kevin J. Anderson, set in the Dune universe created by Frank Herbert. Released on August 4, 2009, it is the second book in the Heroes of Dune series and chronicles events between Frank Herbert's Dune Messiah (1969) and Children of Dune (1976). Before publication, the novel's title was initially announced as Jessica of Dune.

The novel rose to #15 on The New York Times Best Seller list in its second week of publication.

== Plot introduction ==
The novel opens with the Lady Jessica back on Arrakis following the disappearance of her son Emperor Paul-Muad'Dib, who according to Fremen custom has walked into the desert to die after he is blinded. The story of the friendship between Paul and Bronso Vernius is also told.
