= Dune: The Battle of Corrin =

2004 novel by Kevin J. Anderson and Brian Herbert

- First edition cover
- Authors: Brian Herbert; Kevin J. Anderson
- Audio read by: Scott Brick
- Cover artist: Stephen Youll
- Language: English
- Series: Legends of Dune
- Genre: Science fiction
- Publisher: Tor Books
- Publication date: 2004
- Publication place: United States
- Media type: Print (hardback & paperback)
- Pages: 620
- ISBN: 0-7653-0159-8
- OCLC: 54822702
- Dewey Decimal: 813/.54 22
- LC Class: PS3558.E617 D88 2004
- Preceded by: Dune: The Machine Crusade

Dune: The Battle of Corrin is a 2004 science fiction novel by Brian Herbert and Kevin J. Anderson, set in the fictional Dune universe created by Frank Herbert. It is the third book in the Legends of Dune prequel trilogy, which takes place over 10,000 years before the events of Frank Herbert's celebrated 1965 novel Dune. The series chronicles the fictional Butlerian Jihad, a crusade by the last free humans in the universe against the thinking machines, a violent and dominating force led by the sentient computer Omnius.

The events of the novel take place a full century after the beginning of the Butlerian Jihad. It is divided into two parts, the first of which begins in the year 108 B.G. (before Guild) and details a biological war waged by the thinking machines on the humans. The second part of the novel begins in 88 B.G. and covers the events after the Great Purge, leading up to the fateful Battle of Corrin. At the conclusion of the Legends of Dune series, several storylines started in the previous two novels lead to the political and social climate that is well established in Frank Herbert's original Dune series.

Dune: The Battle of Corrin rose to #9 on The New York Times Best Seller list in its second week of publication.

== Plot summary ==
The machine evermind Omnius is continuing with its plans to eradicate all humans in the universe. After first being suggested by the traitor Yorek Thurr, an RNA retrovirus is designed by the captured Tlulaxa Rekur Van and the independent robot Erasmus. Omnius then launches capsules containing the retrovirus to infect the planets inhabited by the hapless humans. With a 43% direct-mortality rate, the virus succeeds in effectively crippling the League of Nobles, leaving them vulnerable to attack.

It is discovered that consumption of the spice melange has the effect of both bolstering immunity to the retrovirus and stopping its progression in some of those already infected. Omnius, unaware that the virus has been effectively stopped, prepares for the second phase of its attack. Gathering the bulk of the machine armies stationed at the different synchronized planets, the evermind launches the massive fleet towards the League capital Salusa Secundus. After learning of the imminent destruction headed their way in the form of the machine fleet, Vorian Atreides formulates a plan whereby the humans can launch pulse-atomic attacks on all of the undefended Synchronized Worlds, ridding the universe of Omnius altogether. However, this plan called for the use of the still unreliable space-folding technology in order to carry out the attacks before the machines have a chance to recall the fleet en route to Salusa. The Great Purge is successful in destroying Omnius on all but one planet, albeit with an appalling cost in human lives because each planet was turned into slag, and while all the machines were obliterated, all the captured humans and slaves on these planets were also killed. Each time the human armies fold space to a new location there is a 10% attrition rate due to the undependable space-folders because of the uncertainty principle. In all, it amounted to billions of lives lost. The humans are also unable to destroy Omnius on the primary synchronized world, Corrin. While the other Evermind incarnations are being attacked, the cogitor Vidad travels to Corrin and warns Corrin-Omnius of the human counter-offensive. The machine fleet is recalled to defend their last remaining stronghold. Despite this, Serena Butler's Jihad is declared over. The Great Purge ended with an impasse between humans and thinking machines on the planet Corrin. While unable to destroy the machines, the human army is able to trap them on Corrin by surrounding the planet with a net of scrambler satellites, so that any thinking machine attempting to leave would have its gelcircuitry mind destroyed. This situation continues for almost 20 years with the machines unable to escape, and most humans unwilling to enter another battle.

Omnius, again at the suggestion of Thurr, sends machines with primitive minds that can evade the scrambler network to attack Salusa Secundus and Rossak. These attacks have a limited effect, but are enough to remind the humans that the machines are still a threat. Touting his victory over the Titans (see below), Vorian Atreides convinces the League to attack Corrin. Facing robots using human shields and unable to use their main tactical weapons due to treachery by Abulurd Harkonnen, the Army of Humanity is bogged down around Corrin. They are forced to use most of their atomics to destroy the robot defenders. There is a ground offensive by Ginaz mercenaries that finally destroys Omnius, but not before he sends out an unknown radio message into space. Following the Battle of Corrin, Viceroy Faykan Butler renames himself Faykan Corrino in commemoration.

=== The Cult of Serena ===
Having seen her parents succumb to the Machine ("demon") Scourge, and barely surviving herself, Rayna Butler begins her personal crusade against the thinking machines. Claiming to have had a vision of Serena Butler herself (possibly a hallucination caused by her illness), Rayna begins smashing anything resembling thinking machines, including even innocuous devices, and desperately needed medical equipment. A new group known as the Martyrists who worship The Three Martyrs: Serena Butler, Manion the Innocent, and Iblis Ginjo, are instantly taken up by Rayna's mission. Led by Rayna, the Cult of Serena causes even more mayhem for humans. Despite inherent hypocrisy (such as the destruction of some technology, but the continuous use of spaceships) within the group, the cult's legacy endures. The primary commandment in the Orange Catholic Bible, "thou shall not make a machine in the likeness of a human mind" is attributed directly to Rayna Butler. Furthermore, the group is responsible for the strict laws banning all thinking machines under pain of death (and sometimes torture).

=== Destruction of the Titans ===
During the 20-year impasse the three remaining Titans, Agamemnon, Juno and Dante, are struggling to rebuild their cymek empire. While surveying Wallach IX, which has been devastated during the Great Purge, for possible survivors in need of aid, Primero Quentin Butler (Faykan and Abulurd Harkonnen's father) is captured by cymeks, and taken to the Titan stronghold on Hessra. There he is tortured and converted into a cymek himself. After learning about this, Vorian Atreides feigns retirement and travels to Hessra. Once there he regains his father Agamemnon's trust. In a final coup, Vorian and Quentin successfully kill the Titans and their cymek underlings, but at the cost of Quentin's life.

== Legacy ==
=== The Atreides-Harkonnen Feud ===
A story line followed throughout the novel is the relationship between Vorian Atreides and Abulurd Butler. Abulurd is fiercely loyal to his mentor Vorian. Vorian tells Abulurd the truth behind Xavier Harkonnen's death, and how it was Iblis Ginjo who betrayed humanity and not Xavier. Abulurd changes his last name back to Harkonnen, which is reviled by most in the League. Though this bogs down Abulurd's military career, Vorian still manages to promote him to Segundo in the Army of the Jihad, and finally Bashar in the Army of Humanity. Together they vow to win the war against the thinking machines, and once this goal is met, to clear the name of Xavier Harkonnen.

Their relationship takes a bad turn during the Battle of Corrin when faced with the human-shield situation. Erasmus has placed two million captive humans in an array of cargo containers rigged to explode once the human fleet advances, called the Bridge of Hrethgir. Vorian believes that sacrificing the captive humans is a necessary loss, but Abulurd disagrees. The two argue until Vorian relieves Abulurd of his command and has him confined to quarters. In a final attempt to save the captives, Abulurd deactivates the weapons for the entire fleet, making the Corrin attack more difficult and dangerous and eventually causing much higher casualties. Unknown to either, the robot Erasmus disabled the human shield programming, saving the humans in orbit. Following the victory, Abulurd is discharged and branded a coward by Vorian, though not branded a traitor like his grandfather Xavier, and banished from the League. After Abulurd is sentenced to exile on Lankeveil, his children hear stories about how their nobility had been stolen from them. When Abulurd dies of a fever, his sons claim it was Vorian Atreides who had brought the fever to destroy the Harkonnens. When House Harkonnen returns to the empire, their wild accusations at House Atreides are accepted as truth. Thus begins the feud between House Atreides and House Harkonnen.

=== The Bene Gesserit ===
The Sorceresses of Rossak take their final steps toward becoming the Bene Gesserit sisterhood when a resurgence of the machine plague occurs after the Great Purge. Raquella Berto-Anirul (granddaughter of Vorian Atreides) and Mohandas Suk, two doctors, arrive to assist with the new outbreak. After being infected herself, Raquella makes a miraculous recovery due to substances found on the planet. Paranoid and feeling that the doctor might somehow usurp her power, the leader of the Sorceresses, Ticia Cenva, poisons Raquella with the Rossak drug. Rather than killing her, the ordeal awakens Other Memory within Raquella. She manages to internally convert the poison into a harmless substance, thus being the first to undergo what would later become the Spice Agony. Ticia kills herself, and it is implied that Raquella becomes the first Bene Gesserit Reverend Mother. After the Butlerian Jihad, Raquella assumes authority over the Sorceresses of Rossak and their breeding programs and founds the Bene Gesserit school of thought.

=== The Suk School ===
After the situation on Rossak is resolved, Mohandas Suk sets out on his mission to "form a medical school like none the League has ever seen". This, of course, is later known as the Suk School.

=== The Guild ===
Determined to find a solution to the space-folding problem, Norma Cenva experiments on herself by sealing herself inside a tank filled with gaseous melange. After mutating horribly, she finds out that she is capable of guiding a ship through foldspace. At the end of the book, Norma and her son administer the training for the next generation of Navigators. VenKee Enterprises continues to hold their monopoly over Space Folding and continues to strengthen their company, later transforming into the Guild of Navigators.

=== The Mentats ===
Erasmus continues his experiment with his ward Gilbertus Albans, whom he names his Mentat. After seventy years it becomes clear that the independent robot loves his "son" even though he has no problem brutalizing other humans. When Gilbertus sneaks onto one of the cargo haulers of the Bridge of Hrethgir containing a Serena Butler clone with whom he is infatuated, Erasmus disables the explosive trip mechanism in order to save him. In doing so, Erasmus dooms the entire machine empire. Realizing that hrethgir will rule the universe, he suggests to Gilbertus that he teach the other humans to "think efficiently". Erasmus apparently survives the battle when Gilbertus smuggles away his memory core.

=== The Fremen ===
During the rush for spice to aid with the retrovirus epidemic, many prospectors come to Arrakis. The novel follows the struggle between Ishmael, who wishes to follow strict Zensunni tradition, and his stepson El'hiim, who wants to profit from the off-worlders. Unable to sway El'hiim, Ishmael challenges him to a sandworm duel and loses. Though defeated, many of the Zensunnis choose to leave the community and follow Ishmael as Free Men of Arrakis.

== Reception ==
Dune: The Battle of Corrin rose to #9 on The New York Times Best Seller list in its second week of publication.
