= SciFiDimensions =

Online science fiction magazine

SciFiDimensions was an online science fiction magazine published monthly between February 2000 and February 2010, when it went on hiatus. It was edited and published by John C. Snider, a long-time genre fan who lives in Roswell, Georgia. SciFiDimensions included interviews, articles and reviews covering books, movies, television shows and comic books. Beginning in February 2008, the site launched a companion podcast.

== Awards ==
SciFiDimensions received an honorable mention for Best Website in the 2002 Hugo Awards.
