= Dune prequel series =

Five sci-fi trilogies prequel to 'Dune'

- Dune: House Atreides (1999)
- Prelude to Dune trilogy: House Atreides (1999); House Harkonnen (2000); House Corrino (2001); Legends of Dune trilogy: The Butlerian Jihad (2002); The Machine Crusade (2003); The Battle of Corrin (2004); Heroes of Dune trilogy: Paul of Dune (2008); The Winds of Dune (2009); Princess of Dune (2023); Great Schools of Dune trilogy: Sisterhood of Dune (2012); Mentats of Dune (2014); Navigators of Dune (2016); Caladan trilogy: The Duke of Caladan (2020); The Lady of Caladan (2021); The Heir of Caladan (2022)
- Author: Brian Herbert; Kevin J. Anderson
- Country: United States
- Genre: Science fiction
- Publisher: Spectra (1999–2001); Tor Books (2002–present)
- Published: 1999–present
- Media type: Print (hardback & paperback); Audiobook eBook

The Dune prequel series is a sequence of novel trilogies written by Brian Herbert and Kevin J. Anderson. Set in the Dune universe created by Frank Herbert, the novels take place in various time periods before and in between Herbert's original six novels, which began with 1965's Dune. In 1997, Bantam Books made a $3 million deal with the authors for three Dune prequel novels, partially based upon notes left behind by Frank Herbert, that would come to be known as the Prelude to Dune trilogy. Starting with 1999's Dune: House Atreides, the duo have published 15 Dune prequel novels to date.

Dune itself is frequently cited as the best-selling science fiction novel in history, and won the 1966 Hugo Award and the inaugural Nebula Award for Best Novel. Herbert wrote five sequels before he died in 1986.

Brian Herbert and Anderson have also published Hunters of Dune (2006) and Sandworms of Dune (2007), sequels to Frank Herbert's final novel Chapterhouse: Dune (1985) which complete the chronological progression of his original series and wrap up storylines that began with his Heretics of Dune (1984).

== Prelude to Dune ==
Prelude to Dune is a prequel trilogy of novels written by Brian Herbert and Kevin J. Anderson, set in Frank Herbert's Dune universe. The series takes place in the years leading up to the events in the original novel Dune (1965) and explores the origins of some of its characters. In 1997, Bantam Books made a $3 million deal with the authors for three Dune prequel novels that would come to be known as the Prelude to Dune trilogy. The novels draw from notes left behind by Frank Herbert after his death in 1986.

The books in the series are:

- Dune: House Atreides (1999)
- Dune: House Harkonnen (2000)
- Dune: House Corrino (2001)

=== Comics ===
In May 2020, Boom! Studios announced that it had acquired the comic and graphic novel rights to Dune: House Atreides, with the intent of doing a 12-issue comic adaptation written by the original authors Brian Herbert and Anderson. The series ran from 2020 to 2021, and was followed by comic adaptations of Dune: House Harkonnen (12 issues, 2023) and Dune: House Corrino (8 issues, 2024).

=== Plot ===
The Prelude to Dune series begins four decades before the events of Dune, with an eager Crown Prince Shaddam plotting to succeed his aging father Elrood IX, young House Atreides heir Leto becoming close with the ruling family of the important technology world Ix, and the Bene Gesserit scheming behind the scenes to create the Kwisatz Haderach. As the series progresses, Leto becomes the new Atreides Duke, Shaddam becomes the emperor and aligns with the Bene Tleilax in their takeover of Ix to develop synthetic spice, and the Bene Gesserit punish Baron Vladimir Harkonnen for raping one of them with a disease that slows his metabolism. The Baron Vladimir Harkonnen then plots his revenge against the Bene Gesserit. The Spacing Guild, having found the Tleilaxu synthetic spice to be fatal to its Navigators, forces Shaddam to capitulate to the Landsraad, with Leto playing a role in forcing Shaddam to sign humiliating peace accords, confirming his status as the emperor's leading rival.

=== Reception ===
Dune: House Atreides debuted at No. 13 on the New York Times Best Seller list, and rose to No. 12 in its second week of publication. Dune: House Harkonnen debuted at No. 11 on the same list, and rose to No. 8 its second week. The third installment, Dune: House Corrino, debuted at No. 8 on the New York Times list.

John Snider of SciFi Dimensions found Herbert and Anderson's Prelude to Dune prequels to be "pulpy", though he allowed that they "make [Frank] Herbert's esoteric and philosophical stories more accessible to general audiences."

== Legends of Dune ==
Legends of Dune is a prequel trilogy of novels written by Brian Herbert and Kevin J. Anderson, set in Frank Herbert's Dune universe. The series takes place over 10,000 years before the events of the original novel Dune (1965), and chronicles the universe-spanning war against thinking machines that would eventually become known as the Butlerian Jihad. It also explores the origins of the families and organizations that populate the distinctive universe in other Dune works.

The books in the series are:

- The Butlerian Jihad (2002)
- The Machine Crusade (2003)
- The Battle of Corrin (2004)

=== Plot ===
The series begins more than a millennium after a group of immortal, militant cyborgs calling themselves the Titans seized control of the entire universe in indestructible cymek bodies and then accidentally relinquished control to an artificial intelligence program called Omnius. Omnius and the immortal Titans rule over the 500 planets of the Synchronized Worlds with cruelty while a handful of free planets are united under the League of Nobles, a government using what resources it has to defend against machine aggression. A prominent figure in the human rebellion is Serena Butler, whose young son dies at the hands of the independent robot Erasmus and sparks the Butlerian Jihad, with humanity mounting a decisive offense against machine rule. This crusade against the machines lasts for nearly a century, with much loss of human life but ending in human victory at the Battle of Corrin. The Jihad also gives rise to the Bene Gesserit, the Spacing Guild, the Sardaukar army, the Landsraad, and House Corrino, whose Padishah Emperors rule the universe for the next 10,000 years until the events of Dune.

=== Reception ===
Dune: The Butlerian Jihad rose to No. 7 on The New York Times Best Seller list in its second week of publication. Dune: The Machine Crusade debuted at No. 7 on the list. The third installment, Dune: The Battle of Corrin, reached No. 9 on the New York Times list.

John Snider of SciFi Dimensions found the Legends of Dune prequels as having "cartoonish" AI characters that were "little different than Harkonnens with metal faces."

== Heroes of Dune ==
Heroes of Dune was a planned tetralogy of novels by Brian Herbert and Kevin J. Anderson set in the Dune universe created by Frank Herbert. The potential series was initially referred to as Paul of Dune by the authors as early as 2004. These novels were intended to "fill in the story" between Frank Herbert's early Dune novels.

The books in the series are:

- Paul of Dune (2008)
- The Winds of Dune (2009)
- Princess of Dune (2023)

Half of the story of Paul of Dune takes place between Frank Herbert's Dune (1965) and Dune Messiah (1969) as Paul's Jihad rages, Shaddam seeks to regain his throne and Princess Irulan accepts the "task of building the legend of Muad'Dib". She in turn chronicles Paul's early years (between the 2001 prequel Dune: House Corrino and the 2020 prequel Dune: The Duke of Caladan), which feature "his friendship with Duncan and Gurney and Duke Leto's War of Assassins against Grumman". The Winds of Dune (originally announced as Jessica of Dune) chronicles events between Frank Herbert's Dune Messiah (1969) and Children of Dune (1976), as well as events between the prequel sections of Paul of Dune and the original Dune, and events between Paul of Dune and Dune Messiah.

The final two novels in the series were to be called The Throne of Dune (formerly Irulan of Dune) and Leto of Dune (formerly The Golden Path of Dune). However, in a July 2010 blog post Anderson announced that these novels had been postponed due to plans by Herbert and Anderson to publish a trilogy (later known as Great Schools of Dune) about "the formation of the Bene Gesserit, the Mentats, the Suk doctors, the Spacing Guild and the Navigators, as well as the solidifying of the Corrino imperium." In January 2023, Brian Herbert announced a third Heroes of Dune novel, Princess of Dune, a prequel focused on Chani and Irulan, set two years before the events of Dune. It was released on October 3, 2023.

=== Plot ===
In Paul of Dune, Paul Atreides's childhood lessons in the political intrigues of the empire are juxtaposed with his current struggle to secure his control over it. His Fremen armies are spread across the universe in attempt to bring rebel worlds to heel, and Paul avoids one assassination attempt only to nearly die in another. In The Winds of Dune, Paul's disappearance into the desert has left a power vacuum, and his closest advisors struggle to determine what path his empire should take.

=== Reception ===
The Winds of Dune rose to No. 15 on The New York Times Best Seller list in its second week of publication.

== Great Schools of Dune ==
Great Schools of Dune is a prequel trilogy of novels written by Brian Herbert and Kevin J. Anderson, set in Frank Herbert's Dune universe. A sequel to the Legends of Dune trilogy (2002–2004), the series takes place nearly a century after the events of Brian Herbert and Anderson's Dune: The Battle of Corrin (2004), in which the Army of Humanity finally defeats the thinking machine armies of Omnius. Now, the fledgling Bene Gesserit, Mentat and Suk Schools, as well as the Spacing Guild, are threatened by the independent anti-technology forces gaining power in the aftermath of the Butlerian Jihad. The Great Schools of Dune trilogy, first discussed by Anderson in a 2009 interview and later named by him in a 2010 blog post, chronicles the early years of these organizations, which figure prominently in the original Dune novels. Though the third and final novel was originally identified by Anderson as The Swordmasters of Dune in 2009, in 2014 Brian Herbert and Anderson confirmed that its title would be Navigators of Dune. It was released on September 13, 2016.

The books in the series are:

- Sisterhood of Dune (2012)
- Mentats of Dune (2014)
- Navigators of Dune (2016)

=== Plot ===
In Sisterhood of Dune, the anti-technology Butlerian movement is gaining momentum under the leadership of the popular Manford Torondo. He and his forces are scouring the universe to cleanse humanity of its reliance on convenient technologies, destroying any machinery they can find. Torondo's growing power threatens the Corrino Emperor Salvador, as well as the Sisterhood on Rossak and the Mentat School on Lampadas, each of which harbors secret technology. Space travel tycoon Josef Venport also plots to salvage machinery which he believes can be useful in his business empire. Mentats of Dune finds Gilbertus Albans carefully managing his Mentat School under the watchful eye of the fanatical Butlerians, while Raquella Berto-Anirul seeks to rebuild her own Sisterhood School on Wallach IX. To secure his control of interstellar commerce and strike a blow against the Butlerians, Venport places a trade embargo on any planet which embraces Torondo's movement.

=== Reception ===
Sisterhood of Dune debuted at No. 23 on The New York Times Hardcover Fiction Best Seller List, and Mentats of Dune was released at No. 17 on the same list. Publishers Weekly called Sisterhood a "shallow but fun blend of space opera and dynastic soap opera."

=== Adaptation ===
The American television series Dune: Prophecy premiered on HBO in November 2024, centered on Valya and Tula Harkonnen and the fledgling Sisterhood. Exploring multiple time periods, the series continues the story as Raquella's Sisterhood, now led by Valya, is threatened by outside forces. Some material from the Great Schools of Dune trilogy is adapted as flashbacks.

== Caladan ==
In July 2020, Herbert and Anderson introduced a new trilogy of prequel novels called the Caladan trilogy, set after Dune: House Corrino (2001) and before Dune (1965).

The books in the series are:

- The Duke of Caladan (2020)
- The Lady of Caladan (2021)
- The Heir of Caladan (2022)

== Reception ==
In 2011, Publishers Weekly called the series "a sprawling edifice that Frank Herbert's son and Anderson have built on the foundation of the original Dune novels." Jon Michaud of The New Yorker wrote in 2013, "The conversion of Dune into a franchise, while pleasing readers and earning royalties for the Herbert estate, has gone a long way toward obscuring the power of the original novel." In 2024, Charles Papadopoulos of Screen Rant wrote that the prequel novels "have never been as well-received as the originals", but noted, "While the expanded Dune books aren't hated, the typical analysis is that they just don't have the depth of the originals despite expanding the universe's lore in numerous ways."
