= Dune: House Corrino =

2001 novel by Brian Herbert and Kevin J. Anderson

- First edition cover
- Authors: Brian Herbert; Kevin J. Anderson
- Audio read by: Scott Brick
- Cover artist: Stephen Youll
- Language: English
- Series: Prelude to Dune
- Genre: Science fiction
- Publisher: Spectra
- Publication date: 2001
- Publication place: United States
- Media type: Print (hardback & paperback)
- Pages: 512
- ISBN: 0-553-11084-5
- OCLC: 46565153
- Dewey Decimal: 813/.54 21
- LC Class: PS3558.E617 D865 2001
- Preceded by: Dune: House Harkonnen

Dune: House Corrino is a 2001 science fiction novel by Brian Herbert and Kevin J. Anderson, set in the fictional Dune universe created by Frank Herbert. It is the third book in the Prelude to Dune prequel trilogy, which takes place before the events of Frank Herbert's celebrated 1965 novel Dune. The Prelude to Dune novels draw from notes left behind by Frank Herbert after his death.

Dune: House Corrino debuted at #8 on The New York Times Best Seller list.

== Plot summary ==
One year after the War of Assassins, Duke Leto Atreides sponsors an assault on Ix to reclaim the planet for House Vernius, while his concubine Jessica is pregnant with his son. Emperor Shaddam IV commences his Great Spice War to create a dependency on his soon-to-be-released synthetic melange, ajidamal. The Bene Gesserit eagerly await the birth of the Kwisatz Haderach's mother by Jessica; little do they know that things are not going to turn out exactly how they intend.

== Reception ==
Dune: House Corrino debuted at #8 on The New York Times Best Seller list.

== Adaptation ==
In February 2024, Boom! Studios announced an 8-issue comic adaptation of Dune: House Corrino written by the original authors Brian Herbert and Kevin J. Anderson to conclude their adaptation of the Prelude to Dune trilogy.
