= Dune Messiah =

1969 science fiction novel by Frank Herbert

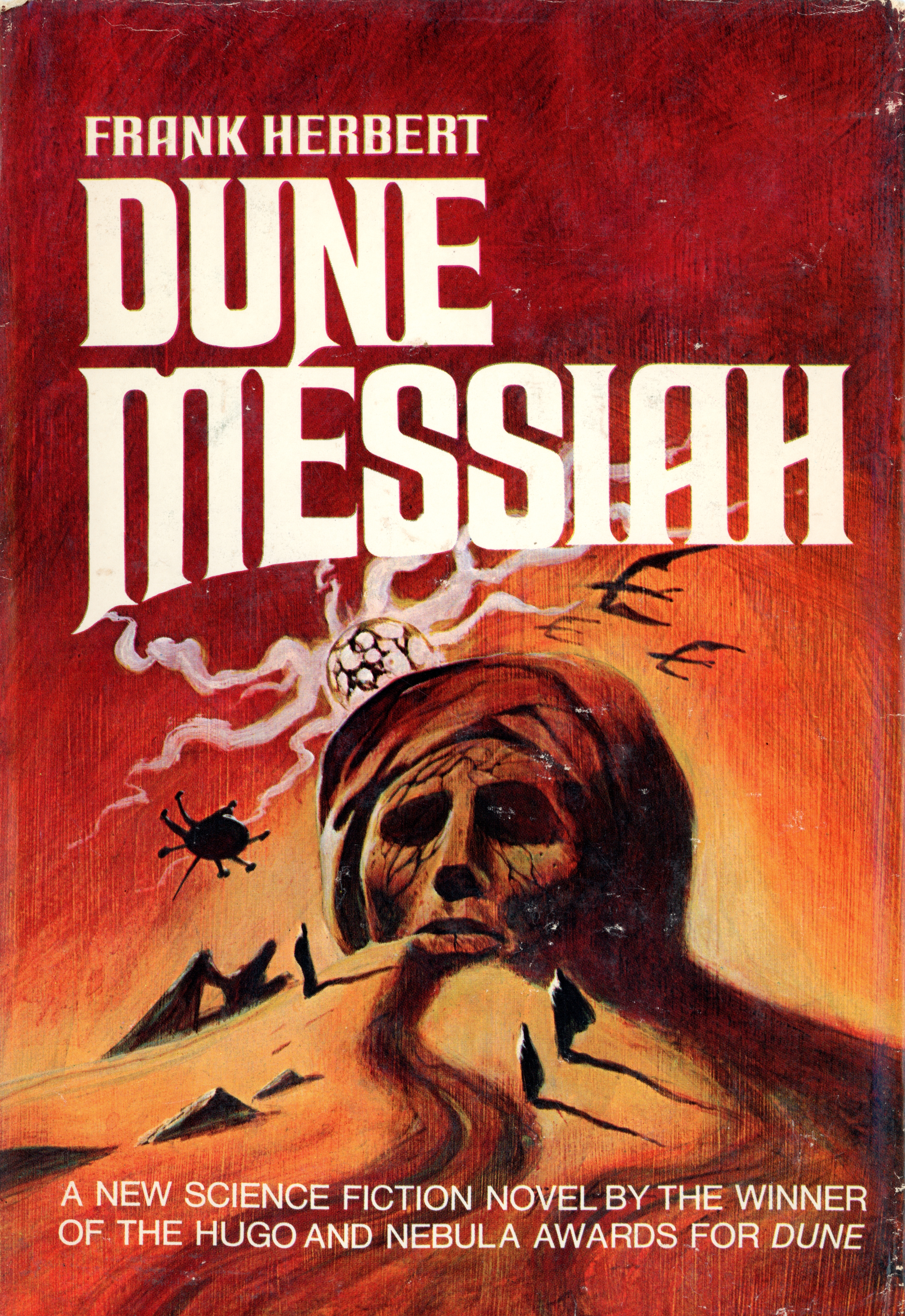
- Reproduction of first edition cover
- Author: Frank Herbert
- Audio read by: Scott Brick; Katherine Kellgren; Euan Morton; Simon Vance
- Cover artist: Jack Gaughan
- Language: English
- Series: Dune
- Genre: Science fiction
- Published: 1969
- Publisher: Putnam Publishing
- Publication place: United States
- Media type: Print (hardcover & paperback)
- Pages: 256
- OCLC: 32595
- Dewey Decimal: 813/.5/4
- LC Class: PZ4.H5356 Du PS3558.E63
- Preceded by: Dune
- Followed by: Children of Dune

Dune Messiah is a 1969 science fiction novel by American writer Frank Herbert, the second in his Dune series of six novels. A sequel to Dune (1965), it was originally serialized in Galaxy magazine in 1969, and then published by Putnam the same year.

Dune Messiah and its sequel Children of Dune (1976) were collectively adapted by the Sci-Fi Channel in 2003 into a miniseries entitled Frank Herbert's Children of Dune. A film adaptation directed by Denis Villeneuve, Dune: Part Three, is scheduled to be released in 2026. It follows his films Dune (2021) and Dune: Part Two (2024).

== Plot ==
Paul "Muad'Dib" Atreides has ruled as Emperor for 12 years. By accepting the role of messiah to the Fremen, he has unleashed a jihad which has conquered most of the known universe but is powerless to stop the lethal excesses of the religious juggernaut he has created. Although 61 billion people have perished, Paul's prescient visions indicate this is far from the worst possible outcome for humanity. Motivated by this knowledge, Paul allows the war to continue and maintains his role as a focal point for the Fremen religion while turning his attention to reforming the Empire and entrenching his dynasty.

The Bene Gesserit, Spacing Guild, and Tleilaxu conspire to dethrone Paul, with the Guild Navigator Edric using his prescience to shield their meetings with the Bene Gesserit Reverend Mother Mohiam and Tleilaxu Face Dancer Scytale from Paul's visions. Mohiam enlists Princess Irulan, daughter of the deposed Padishah Emperor Shaddam IV, who is wed to Paul for political purposes. Paul has refused to father a child with Irulan, but he and his Fremen concubine Chani have also failed to produce an heir, causing tension within his monarchy. Desperate both to secure her place in the Atreides dynasty and to preserve the bloodline for the Bene Gesserit breeding program, Irulan has secretly been giving contraceptives to Chani. Paul is aware of this fact, but has foreseen that the birth of his heir will bring Chani's death, and does not want to lose her.

Edric gifts Paul a ghola named Hayt, a reanimated being of Tleilaxu-make in the image of the deceased Duncan Idaho, Paul's childhood teacher and friend. The conspirators hope the presence of the ghola will weaken Paul's ability to rule by both disconcerting him and appealing to his emotional vulnerability. Furthermore, Paul's acceptance of the gift weakens his support among the Fremen, who see the Tleilaxu and their tools as unclean. Chani, taking matters into her own hands, switches to a traditional Fremen fertility diet, preventing Irulan from tampering with her food, and soon becomes pregnant. However, Chani's extended consumption of Irulan's contraceptive has weakened her, endangering the pregnancy.

Paul learns of a Fremen conspiracy against him, but sees the strands of a Tleilaxu plot. As Paul's soldiers target the conspirators, an atomic weapon sourced from the Tleilaxu called a stone burner destroys the area. Many soldiers are maimed or killed, and Paul is blinded by the attack. By tradition, all blind Fremen exile themselves in the desert, but Paul shocks the Fremen by proving he can still see despite his condition. His oracular powers have become so developed that he can foresee everything, so by moving through his life in lockstep with his visions, he can see even the slightest details of the world around him. Posing as a dwarf servant to Paul, the Tleilaxu agent Bijaz implants a command in Hayt, compelling him to kill Paul if triggered. During childbirth, Chani's weakened body succumbs to the pain and she dies. Paul's reaction to her death triggers the command in Hayt to kill Paul, however, Hayt's ghola body resists, and the trauma forces Duncan's full consciousness to be recovered, simultaneously making him independent of Tleilaxu control.

Before her death, Chani gives birth to twins who, like Alia, have full access to both their male and female ancestral memories. The son is a total surprise for Paul, who had only foreseen the birth of their daughter. Scytale offers to revive Chani as a ghola, revealing the full purpose behind Hayt's presence and the restoration of his memories. Paul refuses, considering the possibility that the Tleilaxu might program a Chani ghola in some diabolical way. Scytale threatens the infants with a knife, demanding that Paul abdicate and relinquish all of his CHOAM holdings in return for his children's lives. By successfully escaping the oracular trap and setting the universe on a new path, Paul has been rendered completely blind, yet he is able to kill Scytale with a dagger to the eye due to a vision from his son's perspective. Now prophetically and physically blind, Paul chooses to embrace the Fremen tradition and walks alone into the desert, winning the fealty of the Fremen for his children, who will inherit his empire.

Paul leaves his sister Alia, herself worshipped by the Fremen and now intimately involved with Duncan, as regent for the twins, whom he has named Leto and Ghanima. Alia orders Stilgar to execute Edric, Mohiam, and others involved in the plot against her brother, going against his wish that the reverend mother should be spared. Alia spares Irulan, who in grief for Paul has renounced her loyalty to the Bene Gesserit and vowed to dedicate her life as a teacher to Paul's children. Duncan notes the irony that Chani's death and Paul's nullification have enabled them to triumph against their enemies: the Spacing Guild and the Bene Tleilaxu have been foiled, Irulan's defection from the Bene Gesserit removes the sisterhood's last lever against the Atreides, and Paul has escaped his deification by walking into the desert as a man, while guaranteeing Fremen support for the Atreides line.

== Publication history ==
Parts of Dune Messiah (and its sequel Children of Dune) were written prior to the completion of Dune itself. The novel appeared initially as a five part serial in Galaxy Science Fiction magazine published from June (cover dated July) to October (cover dated November) 1969 with illustrations by Jack Gaughan. A Putnam hardback edition also appeared in October 1969. The American and British editions contain different prologues which summarized the events of Dune. Dune Messiah and Children of Dune were published in a single volume by the Science Fiction Book Club in 2002, and in 1979 by Gollancz with Dune as The Great Dune Trilogy.

== Analysis ==
Herbert likened the initial trilogy of novels (Dune, Dune Messiah, and Children of Dune) to a fugue, and while Dune was a heroic melody, Dune Messiah was its inversion. Paul rises to power in Dune by seizing control of the single critical resource in the universe, melange. His enemies are dead or overthrown, and he is set to take the reins of power and bring a hard but enlightened peace to the universe. Herbert chose in the books that followed to undermine Paul's triumph with a string of failures and philosophical paradoxes.

== Critical reception ==
Galaxy Science Fiction called Dune Messiah "Brilliant ... It was all that Dune was, and maybe a little more." Spider Robinson enjoyed the book "even as [he] was driving a truck through the holes in its logic, because it had the same majestic rolling grandeur of the previous book." Challenging Destiny called the novel "The perfect companion piece to Dune ... Fascinating."

Brian Herbert wrote in the 2008 introduction to the Penguin Random House edition of Dune Messiah that it “hadn’t been favorably received by the critics”, with the consensus being that its sales came “on the coattails of Dune.”

== Adaptations ==
David Lynch had planned to adapt sequels to Dune during the film's production in 1983–1984, with a script tentatively-titled Dune II. Based on Dune Messiah, the film had some differences from the novel's story, much like the first film had. After the critical and commercial failure of Dune, the sequel did not proceed. The partial script developed by Lynch with notes by Frank Herbert was discovered in summer 2023 at Herbert's archives at California State University, Fullerton. Lynch describes the novel as “a very short book, and a lot of people don’t like it, but in there are some really nifty ideas.”

Dune Messiah and its sequel Children of Dune (1976) were collectively adapted by the Sci-Fi Channel in 2003 into a miniseries entitled Frank Herbert's Children of Dune. The first installment of the three part, six-hour miniseries covers the bulk of the plot of Dune Messiah. The second and third installments adapt Children of Dune.

=== Villeneuve trilogy ===
Prior to the release of his 2021 theatrical adaptation Dune, director Denis Villeneuve confirmed at the 2021 Venice Film Festival that a film based on Dune Messiah was planned, and it would serve as the third film in a trilogy. After Dune: Part Two (covering the second half of the first novel) was officially greenlit in October 2021, Villeneuve reiterated his hope to continue the series with a third film based on Dune Messiah. In April 2024, following the critical and commercial success of Dune: Part Two, Legendary Pictures confirmed that an adaptation of Dune Messiah was in development, with Villeneuve returning as director. Principal photography for the film, titled Dune: Part Three, began on July 7, 2025, with the film scheduled to be released in the United States by Warner Bros. Pictures on December 18, 2026.
