= Stephen Youll =

English cover artist (born 1965)

- Born: 8 June 1965 (age 60); Hartlepool, England
- Education: Durham New College of Art and Design, Sunderland University
- Known for: Painting, illustration
- Movement: Fantasy, science fiction
- Family: Paul Youll (brother)
- Website: stephenyoull.com

Stephen Youll (born 8 June 1965 in Hartlepool) is a British science fiction artist. He got his start in the genre when his work, done in conjunction with his twin brother Paul, was seen in 1987 at the 45th World Science Fiction Convention in Brighton, England. His first commission, a collaboration with Paul, was for the cover painting for Emerald Eyes by Daniel Keys Moran that was published by Bantam Books. The brothers continued to work together until Stephen moved to the United States. Painting originally in acrylics, he switched to oils and has produced pieces for such clients as Bantam, Ballantine/Del Rey, Warner and Avon. He has also done work for DC Comics, IBM and for Hamilton Plates.

Youll attended the Durham New College of Art and Design and Sunderland University with his brother. Both graduated with honors and began working as reconstruction artists at Durham Cathedral, before beginning their freelance art careers.
