= Dune: Part Three =

Upcoming film by Denis Villeneuve

- Theatrical release poster
- Directed by: Denis Villeneuve
- Screenplay by: Denis Villeneuve; Brian K. Vaughan
- Based on: Dune Messiah by Frank Herbert
- Produced by: Mary Parent; Cale Boyter; Denis Villeneuve; Tanya Lapointe; Joseph M. Caracciolo Jr.
- Starring: Timothée Chalamet; Zendaya; Jason Momoa; Florence Pugh; Rebecca Ferguson; Isaach de Bankolé; Charlotte Rampling; Anya Taylor-Joy; Robert Pattinson; Javier Bardem
- Cinematography: Linus Sandgren
- Edited by: Joe Walker
- Music by: Hans Zimmer
- Production companies: Legendary Pictures; Image Nation Studios
- Distributed by: Warner Bros. Pictures
- Release date: December 18, 2026
- Running time: 150 minutes
- Country: United States
- Language: English

Dune: Part Three is an upcoming American epic space opera film directed by Denis Villeneuve, from a screenplay he wrote with Brian K. Vaughan. Based on the 1969 novel Dune Messiah by Frank Herbert, it is the sequel to Dune: Part Two (2024) and the final installment of a trilogy of films developed by Legendary Pictures. Villeneuve produced the film with his wife and business partner Tanya Lapointe, Legendary's Mary Parent and Cale Boyter, and Joseph M. Caracciolo Jr. Timothée Chalamet leads an ensemble cast as Paul Atreides, a despotic emperor forced to contend with the fallout of his ascent to the throne, including threats of an insurgency and visions of widespread pandemonium.

The film is the second adaptation of Dune Messiah, preceded by its collective adaptation with Children of Dune as John Harrison's 2003 television miniseries Frank Herbert's Children of Dune. Villeneuve envisioned a trilogy of films as early as 2021. He and Vaughan began working on a script concluding Paul's character arc in late 2023, and Legendary commissioned Dune: Part Three the following year. The producers then began hiring filmmakers for the production. Principal photography occurred in Hungary, the United Arab Emirates, Iceland, and Norway from July to November 2025. Hans Zimmer composed the film's score.

Dune: Part Three is scheduled for release in the United States on December 18, 2026.

== Plot ==
Nearly two decades after he seized control of the Imperium, (Note: As depicted in Dune: Part Two (2024).) Paul "Muad'dib" Atreides rules the Known Universe as the ruthless Padishah Emperor, while facing the consequences of his reign. Old allies return, terrifying new threats emerge, and betrayal lurks in every shadow. Haunted by visions of Imperial collapse and the reappearance of his long-lost love, Paul is drawn into a sweeping conspiracy, with Chani at the heart of its unfolding mystery. As rebellion brews and enemies close in, Paul must confront the true cost of power and the fate of those he loves the most.

== Cast ==
- Timothée Chalamet as Paul Atreides:
  The Padishah Emperor of the Known Universe and head of House Atreides, who has the power of prescience and is revered amongst the Fremen as the Lisan-al-Gaib, or the Voice from the Outer World. Chalamet described playing Paul in Part Three as "fantastic to chew on as an actor, where it's not purely redemptive", preferring to not label him as an 'anti-hero' or a hero. Director Villeneuve further distinguishes Paul's arc in the film as different from the first two, with Paul "dealing with the consequences of his actions and his decisions, so it's more of a redemption story" and "living with the burden of what he created, trying to find a way out of this spiral of violence". Co-star Momoa described Chalamet as "a whole 'nother person, what he brings to being the Emperor", calling him "strong, silent, and violent" and "comes in like a nuke".
- Zendaya as Chani, a young and rebellious Fremen warrior and Paul's romantic partner
- Jason Momoa as Hayt:
  A ghola created in the image of Duncan Idaho, the deceased swordmaster of House Atreides and one of Paul's mentors. Momoa described returning in a new form as "nerve-wracking", claiming "It's one of those things where you're like, 'I didn't sign up to play this guy. I signed up to play the other guy.'" He said some of the old Duncan Idaho was hiding in Hayt's genetic code, with Hayt "going to unleash hell on everyone!"
- Florence Pugh as Irulan Corrino:
  Paul's wife, the daughter of former Padishah Emperor Shaddam IV, and the Empress Consort of the Known Universe who schemes with Scytale and the Bene Gesserit to dethrone Paul as Emperor. "She's watched the world change," Pugh said of Irulan's motivation for committing treason. "She's watched morals change. She's wanted people die. She's watching the [man] that she believed in turn from her...She's genuinely terrified...She's scared of being killed, being executed. She's been put in this position where she actually has immense power, but is totally terrified of using it."
- Rebecca Ferguson as Lady Jessica, a Bene Gesserit Reverend Mother and Paul and Alia's mother
- Isaach de Bankolé as Farok, Paul's former Fedaykin death commando, now disillusioned with Paul
- Charlotte Rampling as Reverend Mother Mohiam, a Bene Gesserit Reverend Mother and the former Emperor's Truthsayer
- Anya Taylor-Joy as Alia Atreides:
  Paul's sister who gained prescience in the womb after her mother Lady Jessica drank the Water of Life while pregnant. Taylor-Joy had appeared as Alia in an uncredited cameo in Dune: Part Two. On her connection to Paul, she noted he is "the only person who's ever made her feel like she makes sense." Co-star Chalamet called Alia "actually terrifying and amazing".
- Robert Pattinson as Scytale, a Tleilaxu Face Dancer who strives to execute a plot to dethrone Paul
- Javier Bardem as Stilgar, the leader of the Fremen tribe at Sietch Tabr and one of Paul's most loyal followers
- Josh Brolin as Gurney Halleck, weapons master of House Atreides and one of Paul's mentors
- Nakoa-Wolf Momoa as Leto II Atreides, Paul and Chani's son and Ghanima's twin brother
- Ida Brooke as Ghanima Atreides, Paul and Chani's daughter and Leto II's twin sister

== Production ==
=== Development ===
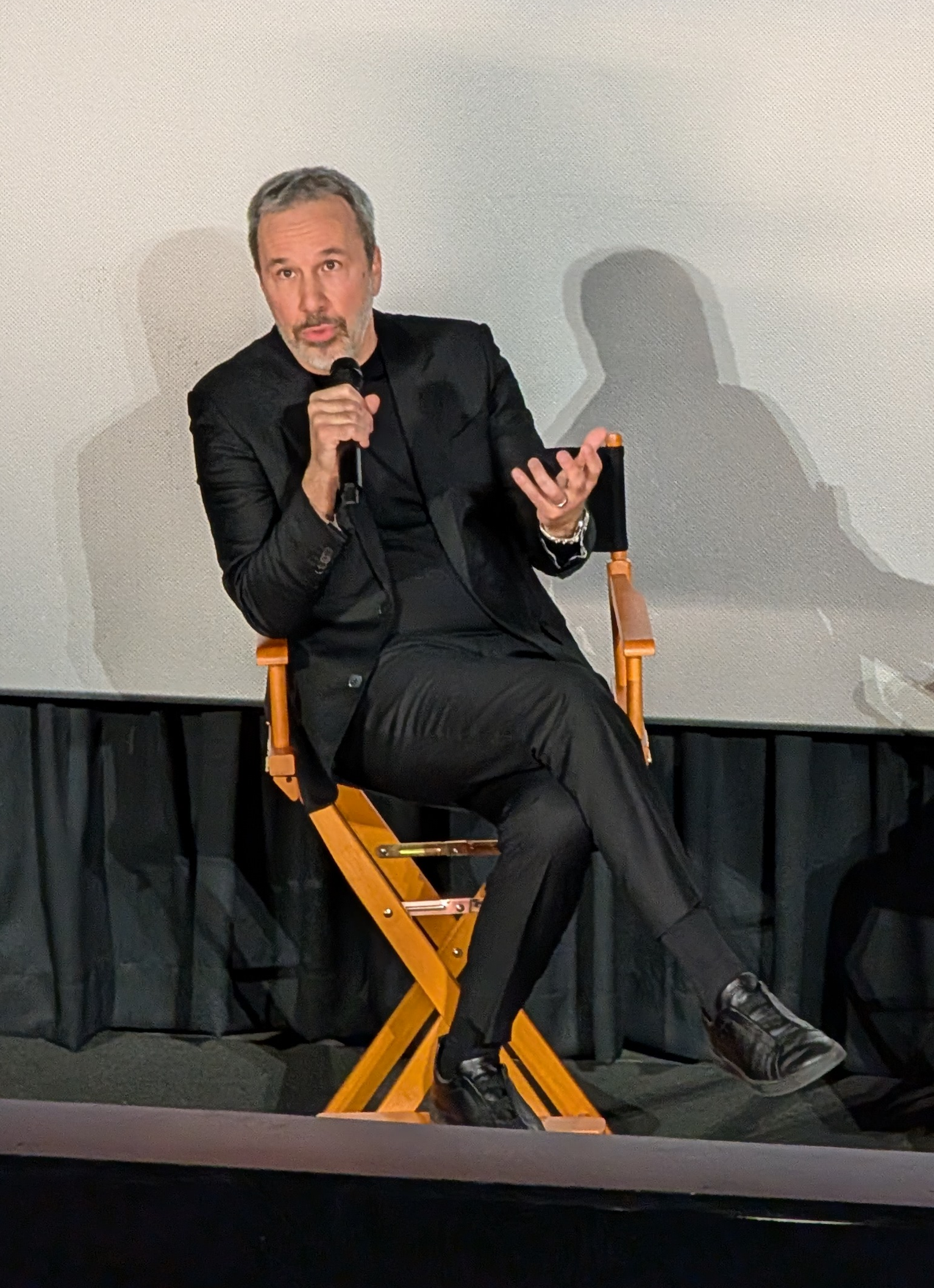
Denis Villeneuve at a Dune: Part Three press event, 2026.

Legendary Entertainment vice chair Mary Parent and her producing partner Cale Boyter bought the film rights to Frank Herbert's science fiction novel Dune (1965) from the Herbert estate in 2011. It took another five years to finalize the transfer of the rights as a consequence of turnover, changes in legal representation, and several other legal hurdles. In January 2017, the producers hired Denis Villeneuve under a multi-picture deal as director of Dune (2021), the terms of which stipulated the novel's adaptation in two films.

Villeneuve was considering a trilogy of films as early as 2021. Interviews around that time involving him or other Dune filmmakers, such as Jon Spaihts, further fueled media speculation about a third film based on Dune Messiah (1969). Villeneuve said such a film would be his final Dune project, one that he intended to develop after Timothée Chalamet had aged. One reason was because he wanted to take a break from filming to rest and focus on other ventures. He may have also sought this choice to correspond with the twelve year passage of time in Dune Messiah.

Following the release of Dune: Part Two (2024), Legendary executives began discussing the production of a sequel. The studio approved development of Dune: Part Three in April 2024. That June, Warner Bros. Pictures announced a December 18, 2026 release date for an undisclosed film directed by Villeneuve, which The Hollywood Reporter and Deadline Hollywood suspected was Dune: Part Three. After slightly over a year, the film's title was revealed in the media.

Villeneuve called Dune: Part Three "more action-packed and tense" than his other films because it focuses on Paul navigating life as a ruler with absolute power. The Writers Guild of America West (WGAW) credits the director and Brian K. Vaughan as the writers of the film's finished script. The filmmakers commenced work on the script in August 2023, lasting until at least September or October 2024. Their main objective was to resolve the long-running narrative about Paul. The script modifies the book story in a number of respects. In Dune Messiah, the timeline jump spans a shorter period, compared to seventeen years in Dune: Part Three. Villeneuve's film frames Paul and Chani's relationship as a source of friction by continuing Chani's presentation as a critic of the prophecy. Chalamet said Villeneuve exerted the most creative freedom in Dune: Part Three.

=== Casting ===
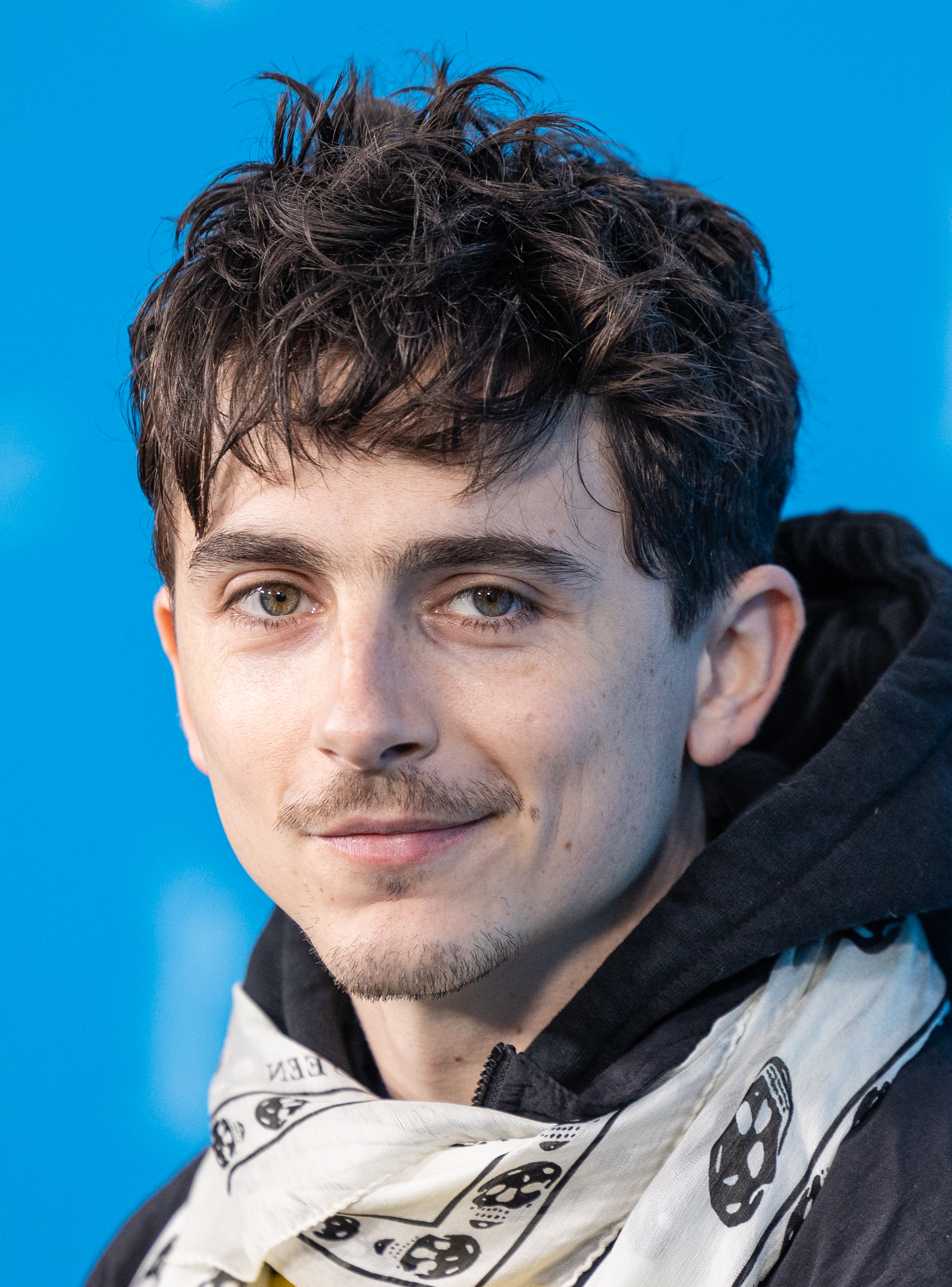
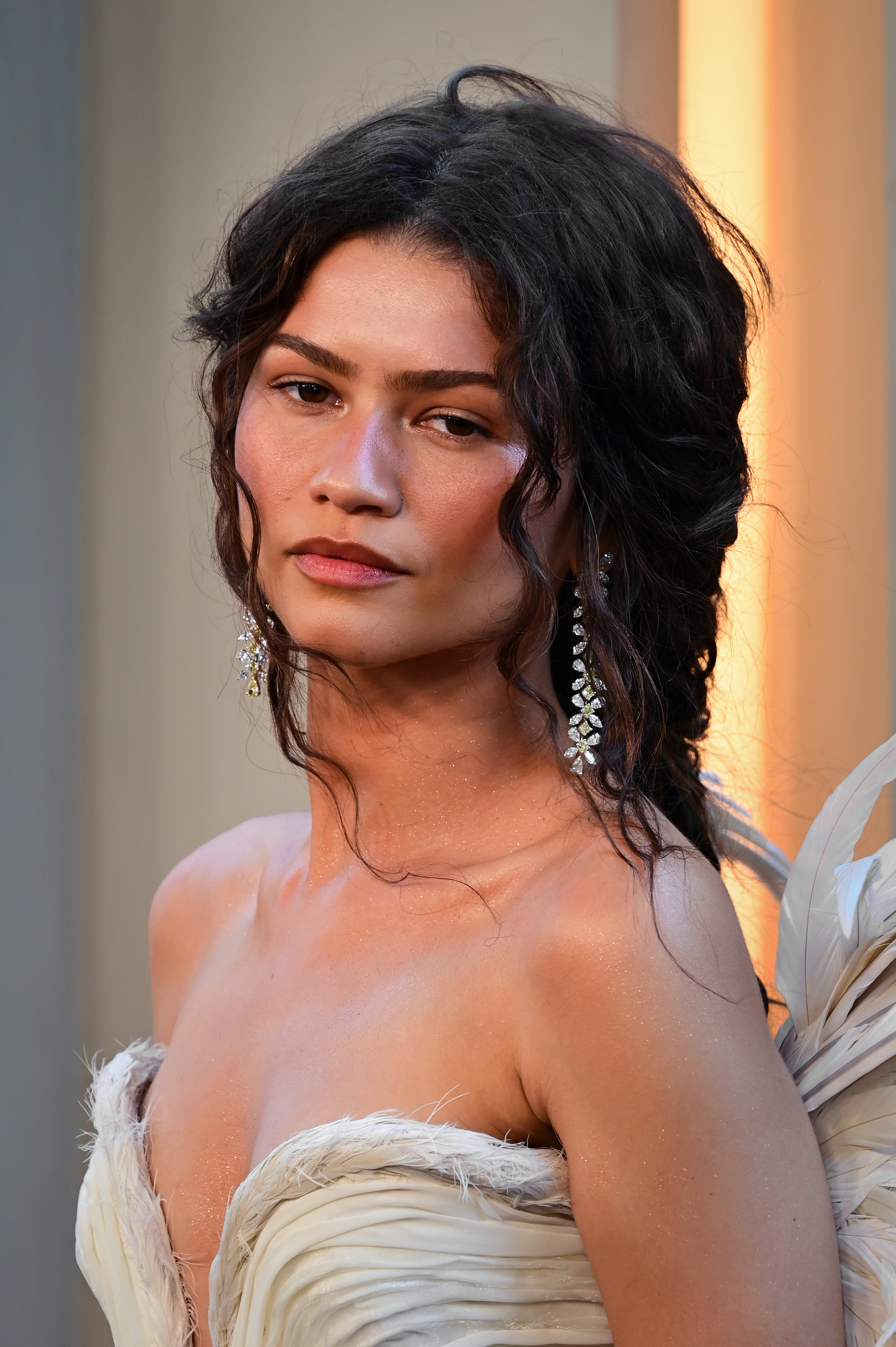
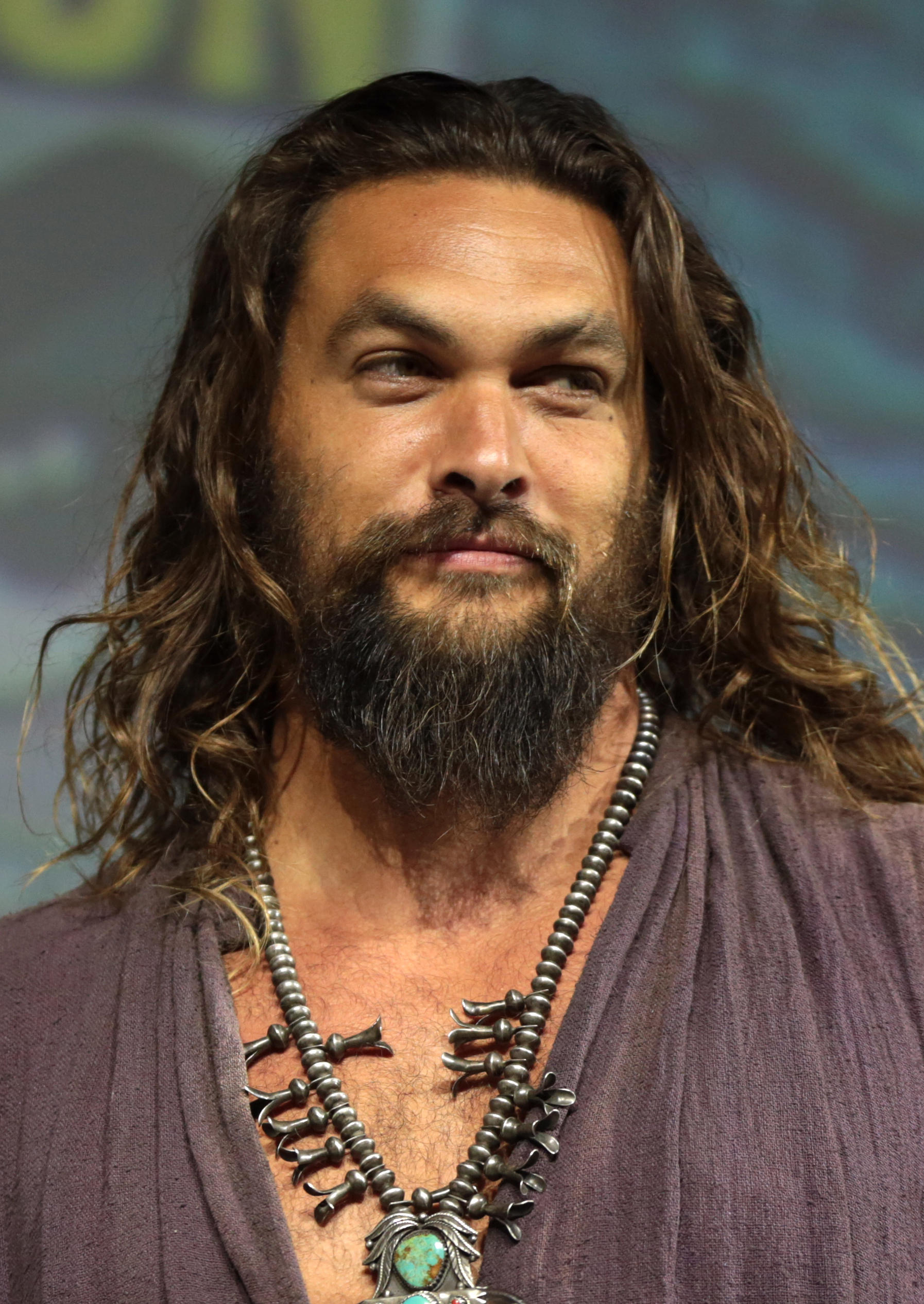
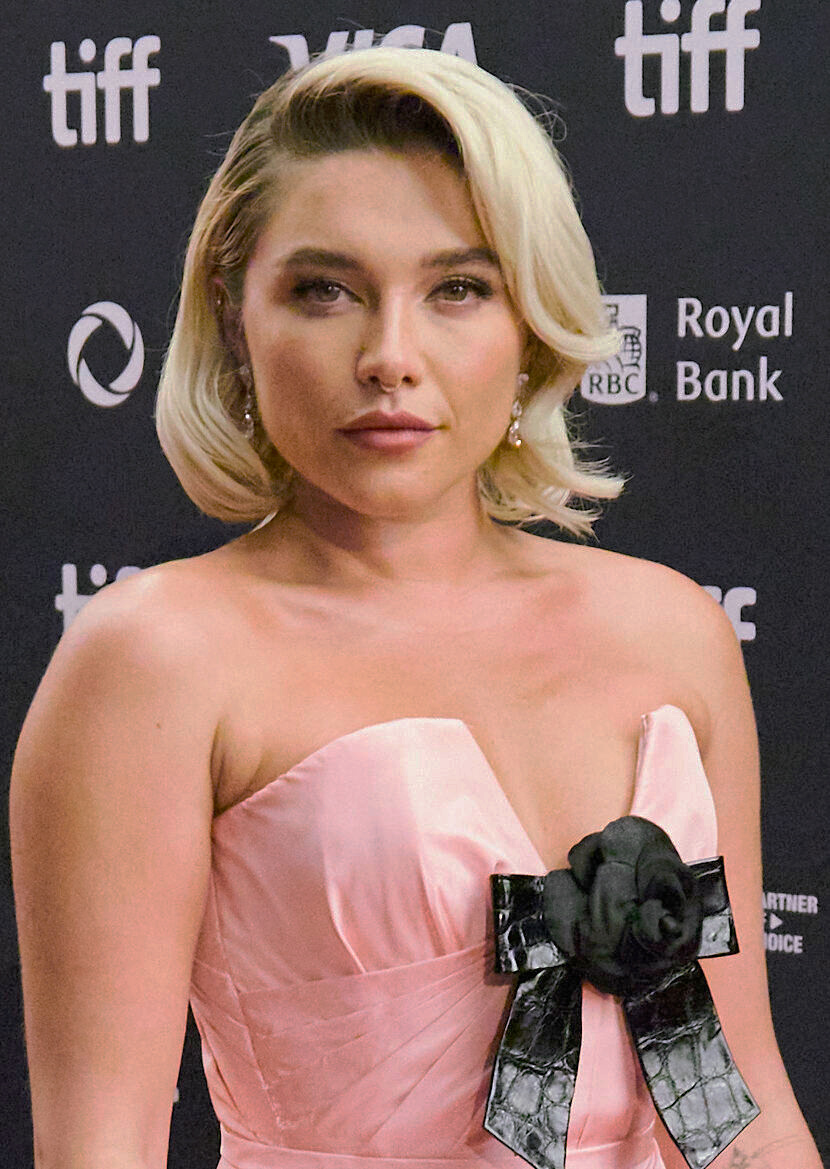
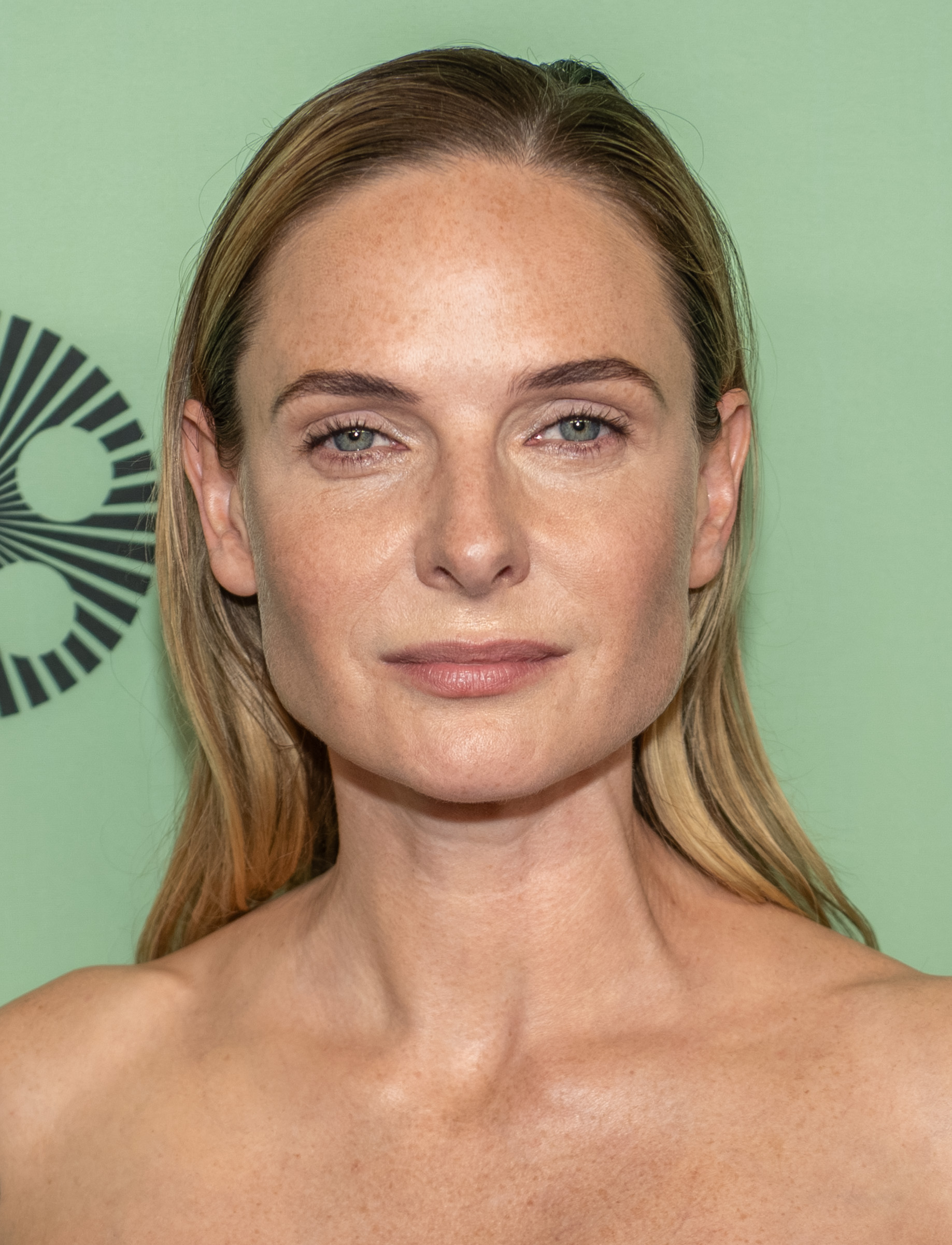
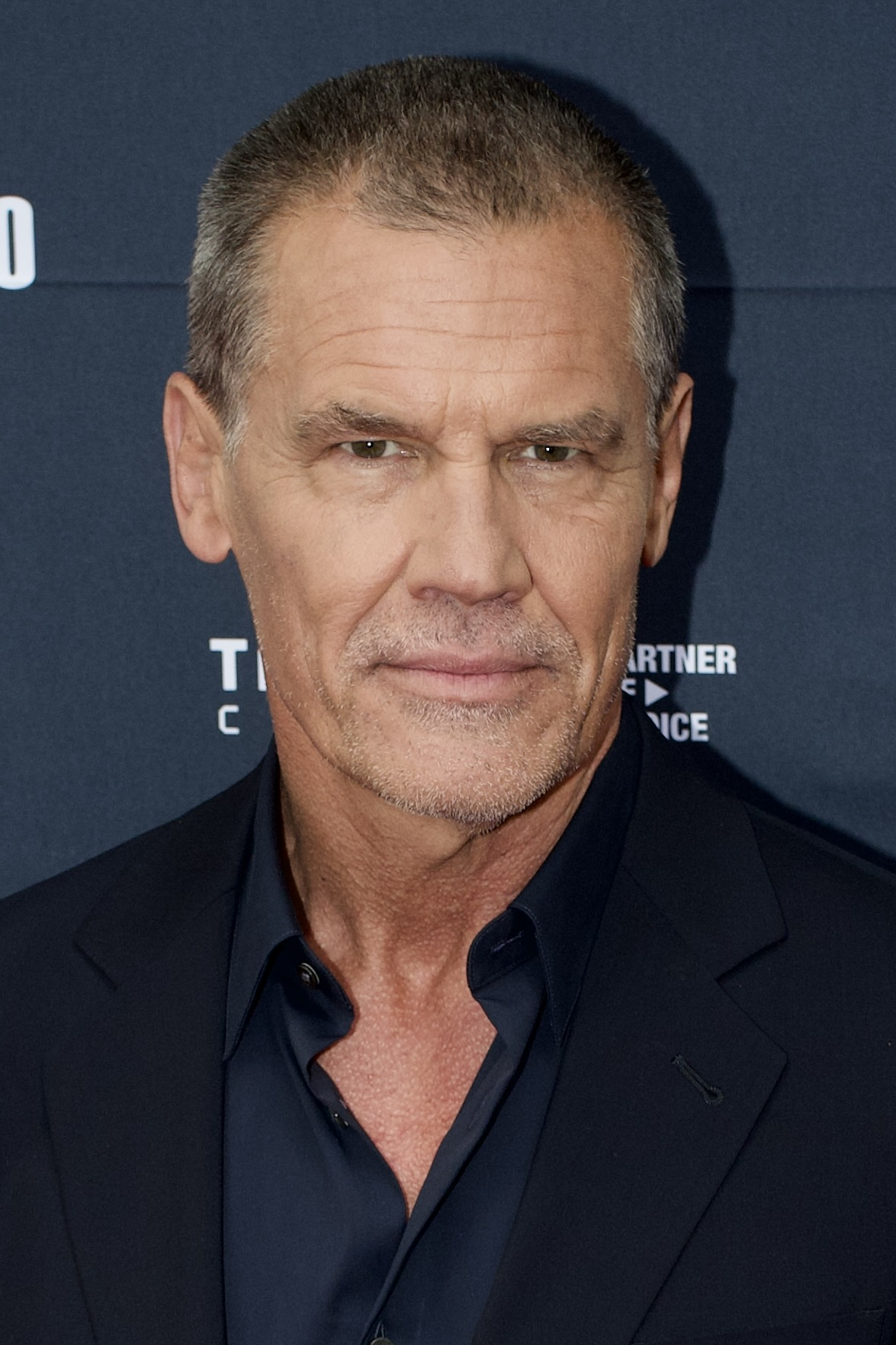
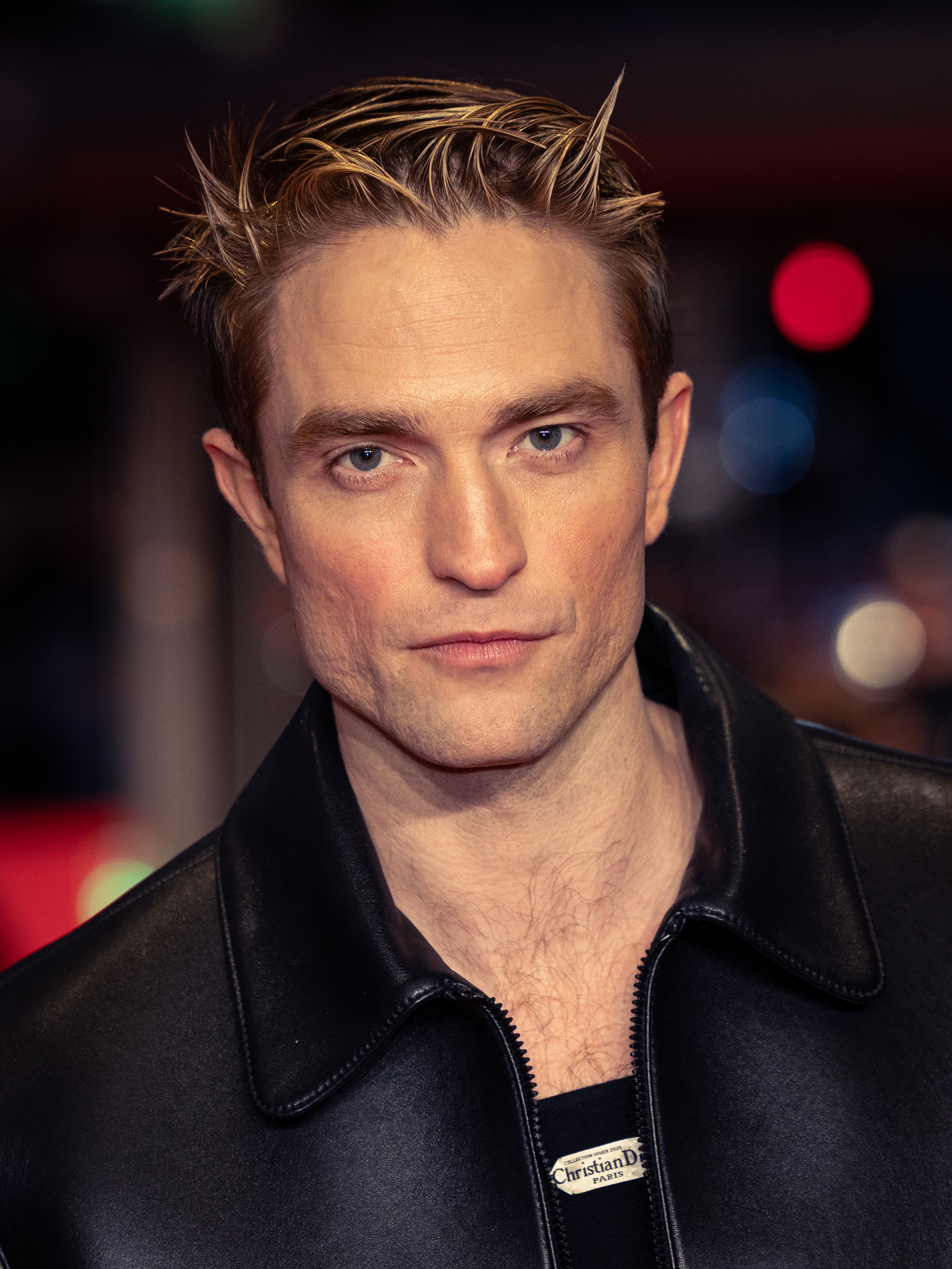
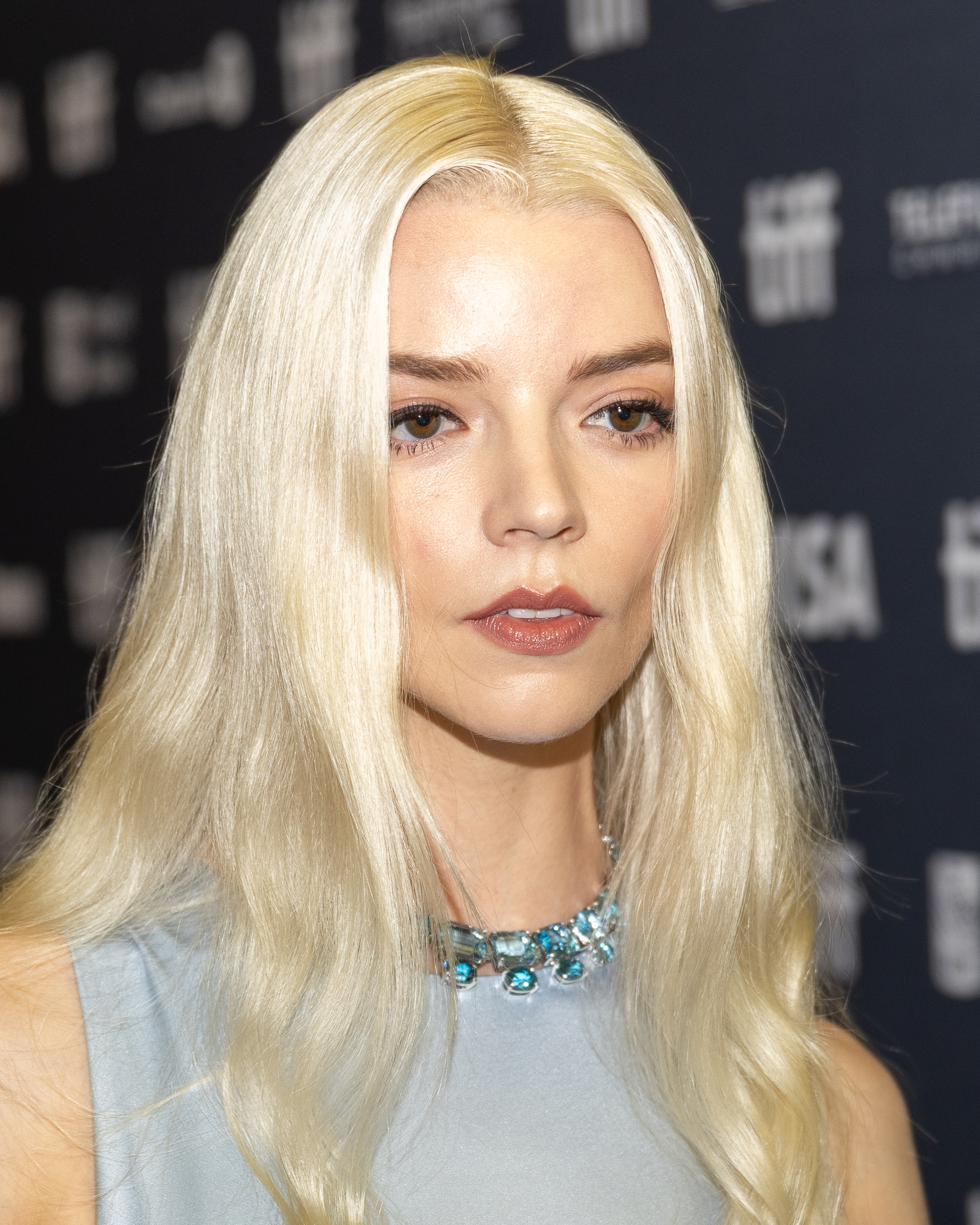
Select cast from left to right: Timothée Chalamet, Zendaya, Jason Momoa, Florence Pugh, Rebecca Ferguson, Josh Brolin, Robert Pattinson, Anya Taylor-Joy, and Javier Bardem.

The producers were hiring actors by June 2024. Most of the ensemble reprise roles from earlier Dune films, including Chalamet, Zendaya, Florence Pugh, Jason Momoa, Josh Brolin, Rebecca Ferguson, and Javier Bardem. (Note: Attributed to multiple references:) To play a corrupted Paul, Chalamet's manner of preparation was to shave his head and research the behavior of heads of state. His head was shaven by filmmakers every other day to remain bald.

Among the new actors in the cast are Robert Pattinson, Anya Taylor-Joy, and Isaach de Bankolé. Pattinson's casting as the villain Scytale had been speculated since April 2025 and was confirmed the following June. Pattinson said he was drawn to Scytale because he was morally ambiguous, a trait he felt made the character unlike the usual villain. The actor finished filming his scenes in November 2025. Dune: Part Three will also feature Ida Brooke and Momoa's son Nakoa-Wolf Momoa, in his acting debut, playing Ghanima and Leto Atreides II, Paul and Chani's twin children.

=== Filming ===
Principal photography began on July 7, 2025, in Budapest, Hungary and ran until that November. Dune: Part Three's Budapest shoot operated from four production facilities. Altogether, the filmmakers used 925,000 sq ft (85,900 m^{2}) of studio space for constructed sets, each typically taking between fourteen to sixteen weeks to build. An outlier is the imperial throne set, which took twenty weeks to construct. The metal cast screens covering the throne's windows are characterized by a design influenced by the Saint-Ambroise Church in Montreal. More notable sets in Dune: Part Three depict Wallach IX, the Bene Gesserit home planet, and Veteran's District, the living quarters for retired Fremen fighters. Representations of the Eye of Providence feature as a motif in several imperial palace sets, a choice that, according to production designer Patrice Vermette, was drawn from the title of the novel.

The filmmaking crew shot exterior scenes in the United Arab Emirates, Iceland, and Norway. Filming in Norway took place in the country's northwestern coast, specifically the Kråkenes region, standing in for Caladan in flashback scenes. Footage showing a seaside expanse on the planet Enfeil was shot on a beach in Iceland's Ingólfshöfði because it had black sand. Iceland was one of several countries the production scouted in search of a location to execute Villeneuve's idea of a "black surface going on for forever, a super flat surface with those low clouds and a band of light, just the sun piercing through the horizon." In the UAE, principal photography was based in Abu Dhabi, where filmmakers shot Dune: Part Three in the Liwa Oasis and a plateau near the city of Al Ain. The Liwa Oasis set consumed thirty one days of the filming schedule, employing about 600 workers. Dune: Part Three qualified for a thirty five percent tax rebate on in-state costs from the Abu Dhabi municipal government. The production deployed three filmmaking teams at various points, including a "psychedelic unit" partly supervised by Villeneuve's daughter Salomé. Linus Sandgren replaced Greig Fraser as director of photography; Fraser left due to a preexisting commitment to Sam Mendes's The Beatles – A Four-Film Cinematic Event (2028).

In a CNBC interview in July 2025, IMAX CEO Richard Gelfond stated that Dune: Part Three would be shot wholly with IMAX's proprietary cameras, claims that were disputed by Variety as erroneous. It is only occasionally shot with IMAX film; most of the film was captured on 65 mm film stock. Instead, the filmmakers used IMAX-certified digital cameras for desert scenes as Villeneuve liked the brutality he felt the footage conveyed. This differs from Dune: Part One and Part Two, which were entirely shot with IMAX-certified digital cameras and then printed onto 35 mm film stock, before being re-scanned digitally to emulate shot-on-film photography.

Longtime Villeneuve collaborator Joe Walker oversaw the post-production, which concentrated on the creation of multiple cuts of the film. The filmmakers spent up to mid-2026 conducting the film editing and, thereafter, two or three months composing music, dubbing, and adding the visual effects. Walker said his approach was dictated by the changes in tone, pacing, scale, and presentation exhibited in Dune: Part Three.

=== Costumes ===
Villeneuve worked with costume designer Jacqueline West to create Dune: Part Three's costumes. They first discussed style ideas while West was working on Alejandro G. Iñárritu's comedy Digger (2026) in London. The direction of the story, West says, determined the reference material and in turn clothing choices. That gave way to costume ideas that, unlike the other films, draws from somewhat more modern styles.

West referenced industrialist Howard Hughes attempting to develop costumes for Paul that projected his psychological malaise. She dressed Chalamet in robes of leathers and heavier or embroidered fabrics to convey this demeanor. By contrast, Chani's wardrobe remained largely unchanged, the most significant piece being a redesigned "stillsuit", a Fremen bodysuit that recycles moisture from the host to produce drinkable water. The production of the redesigned stillsuit, made from a stretched rubber-like spandex with molded acrylic plates, was one of the most technically demanding tasks for filmmakers to complete. Some of the crew's costume-making efforts went to the creation of elaborate armor with headwear reminiscent of ancient Japanese armour worn by samurai, which was weatherproofed for the desert.

Costumes for Princess Irulan and Alia incorporate imagery of the Bene Gesserit, the former through headpieces, including metal headdresses designed by the London-based designer Liria Pristine. Irulan's wardrobe comprised mostly blue tones that was said by Vogue to express the sadness of a woman bound to an unhappy marriage. One such piece was a shiny faux fur-esque cape corresponding to a book version made from "blue whale fur". For Alia, West designed pieces referencing Sufi attires, fresco paintings by Gothic painter Giotto in Padua, and, in shots of Taylor-Joy smeared in blood, Sissy Spacek in the horror film Carrie (1976). She had also been inspired by a memory of a wealthy Iranian woman styled in large sunglasses and a white chador. West's idea for Scytale was to create clothes that indicated his shapeshifting ability. She turned to Catholic imagery dating to the early Avignon Papacy as she was fascinated by the historical conceptions of religious persecution.

== Music ==
Hans Zimmer composed the score for Dune: Part Three. Its first single, "Desert Chant", was released by Warner Bros. imprint WaterTower Music on October 20, 2026.

== Release ==
Pattinson, Taylor-Joy, Bardem, Zendaya, and Villeneuve at a Dune: Part Three press event

Warner Bros. will release Dune: Part Three theatrically in the United States in IMAX on December 18, 2026, following insider screenings beginning on December 14. The film's exhibition schedule starts with a three-week exclusivity period in IMAX theaters, which it received over Avengers: Doomsday. It will then expand to other premium formats such as Dolby and ScreenX. IMAX 70 mm tickets first went on sale at nineteen locations in April 2026 and sold out within minutes. Another ticket sale was arranged on August 18, 2026; the spikes in demand resulted in long wait times and site crashes. In the United Kingdom, Dune: Part Three amassed $1.2 million in presales from BFI IMAX, breaking the first-day presale record set by The Odyssey ($1 million). About 33,000 advance tickets were sold within the first 24 hours.

The studios initiated Dune: Part Three's advertising campaign by debuting nine character posters and the first teaser trailer in March 2026. The latter was part of an AMC Theatres presentation event in Los Angeles, featuring Villeneuve and several of the actors either in person or over video. In April, Warner Bros. played seven minutes of footage at a trade show exhibit at CinemaCon, again with some of the filmmakers on stage. Two more trailers were released in July and October 2026. A four minute-preview of Dune: Part Three was shown with IMAX 70 mm screenings of The Odyssey, which released in July 2026, ending with a message from Villeneuve thanking director Christopher Nolan. Warner Bros. will exhibit further previews in tandem with their November 2026 re-releases of Dune and Dune: Part Two in IMAX theaters. The film was promoted with product sponsorships from AMC, Cinemark, Odeon, Regal, CeraVe and Compartés. (Note: Attributed to multiple references:) Merchandise from the theater chains feature various collectible items, including a popcorn bucket from AMC consisting of a double-sided sandworm design.

== Reception ==
=== Accolades ===
Award	Date of ceremony	Category	Recipient(s)	Result	Ref.
Astra Midseason Movie Awards	June 30, 2026	Most Anticipated Film (Second Half of 2026)	Dune: Part Three	Nominated	
Golden Trailer Awards	May 28, 2026	Best Fantasy/Adventure	Warner Bros. / Jax	Nominated	
Golden Trailer Awards	May 28, 2026	Best Original Score	Warner Bros. / Jax	Won	
Golden Trailer Awards	May 28, 2026	Best Summer 2026 Blockbuster Trailer	Warner Bros. / Jax	Nominated	
Hollywood Music in Media Awards	November 18, 2026	Best Original Score — Sci-Fi/Fantasy Film	Hans Zimmer	Nominated	
