= Duncan Idaho =

Fictional character in the Dune universe created by Frank Herbert

- Dune character
- Jason Momoa as Duncan Idaho in Dune (2021)
- First appearance: Dune (1963–65)
- Last appearance: The Winds of Dune (2009)
- Created by: Frank Herbert
- Portrayed by: Richard Jordan (1984 film); James Watson (2000 series); Edward Atterton (2003 series); Jason Momoa (2021 film / 2026 film)

In-universe information
- Occupation: Atreides Swordmaster, later Mentat
- Affiliation: House Atreides; Swordmasters of Ginaz
- Spouses: Alia Atreides (1st ghola); Siona Atreides (later ghola); Murbella (later ghola)
- Children: Rinya; Janess; Gianne; Tanidia

Duncan Idaho is a fictional character in the Dune universe created by Frank Herbert. He was introduced in the first novel of the series, 1965's Dune, and became a breakout character. He was revived in 1969's Dune Messiah. He is the only character to feature in all six of Herbert's original Dune novels.

Idaho was portrayed by Richard Jordan in David Lynch's 1984 film version of Dune, and by James Watson in the 2000 Sci-Fi Channel miniseries. Edward Atterton assumed the role in the 2003 miniseries Children of Dune. The character is played by Jason Momoa in the 2021 Denis Villeneuve film Dune and the upcoming third installment, Dune: Part Three (2026).

== Description ==
In Dune (1965), Duncan is described as a handsome man with "curling black hair" to whom women are easily attracted. Paul Atreides notes Duncan's "dark round face" and "feline movements, the swiftness of reflex that made him such a difficult weapons teacher to emulate." And in Dune Messiah (1969) he is described as having "high cheekbones" and "definite epicanthic folds." Lady Jessica calls him "the admirable fighting man whose abilities at guarding and surveillance are so esteemed." Duncan is fiercely loyal to House Atreides, a skilled pilot, and as a Swordmaster of the Ginaz is a gifted hand-to-hand fighter. In the fight that ends with his death in Dune, Duncan kills an unheard-of 19 Sardaukar, the Padishah Emperor's fearsome supersoldiers. The Sardaukar sell his body to the Tleilaxu; subsequent gholas of Duncan possess the rebellious streak of the original.

In 1976's Children of Dune, Lady Jessica tells Duncan that he was drawn to her daughter Alia because "you wanted a girl you saw as a younger version of me." In God Emperor of Dune (1981), the latest Duncan ghola discovers that one of his predecessors had fathered a child with a woman named Irti who closely resembles Jessica.

== Appearances ==
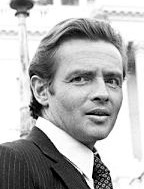
Richard Jordan portrays Duncan in the 1984 film.

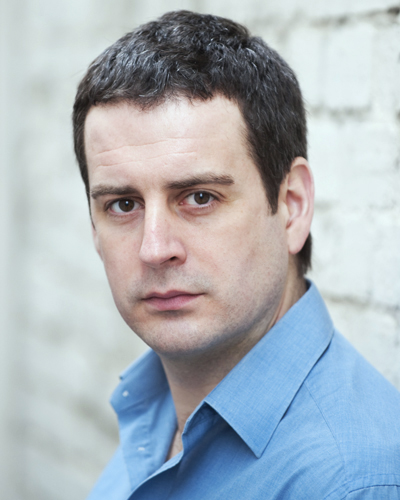
James Watson portrays Duncan in the Dune miniseries (2000).

=== Dune ===
At the time of Frank Herbert's original novel Dune (1965), Idaho is a Swordmaster of the Ginaz in the service of House Atreides and one of Duke Leto's right-hand men (with Gurney Halleck and Thufir Hawat). When the Atreides take over the planet Arrakis at the order of the Padishah Emperor Shaddam IV, Idaho becomes Leto's ambassador to the Fremen, the desert people of Dune that Leto hopes will ally with him in the coming war against the Emperor and the Harkonnens. Idaho goes to live with the Fremen, serving both Leto and Fremen leader Stilgar. When the Emperor's dreaded Sardaukar attack Arrakis in the guise of Harkonnen troops, Idaho initially survives the assault and saves Leto's son Paul Atreides and concubine Lady Jessica. When they are cornered at a Botanical Testing Station, Paul and Jessica flee while Idaho holds off the enemy, but he is ultimately killed. It is noted in Dune Messiah (1969) that a "grievous head wound" had caused Idaho's death, and made clear in Children of Dune (1976) that Idaho had killed an unheard-of tally of nineteen Sardaukar before dying.

=== Dune Messiah and Children of Dune ===
Idaho returns in Dune Messiah (1969) as a ghola named Hayt, made by the Tleilaxu and given to Paul Atreides, now Emperor. The purpose of the gift is 'psychic poison': the ghola is trained to tempt the Kwisatz Haderach Paul into becoming that which he despises. Trained as a Mentat and a Zensunni philosopher, Hayt has no memory of his former life, but constantly feels vague hints and reminders of his previous incarnation that make him hope he can recover those memories.

The seemingly harmless dwarf Bijaz recognizes that Hayt is failing to destroy the Emperor psychologically. As the ghola is of Tleilaxu design, Bijaz employs a specific humming intonation that renders Hayt open to implanted commands. Bijaz programs Hayt to kill Paul when he says the words "She is gone," in the depths of grief over the death of his concubine Chani. But this is only part of the true plan; the emotional distress of the attempt allows Hayt to recover the buried memories of Duncan Idaho, up to and including his death at the hands of the Imperial Sardaukar. This is the culmination of the Tleilaxu plot, as masterminded by the Face Dancer Scytale—to demonstrate to Paul that the Tleilaxu can create for him an exact duplicate of Chani—but only if he abdicates his throne and relinquishes his CHOAM holdings. Paul resists the temptation, killing Scytale himself and having Hayt/Duncan kill Bijaz.

Also in Dune Messiah, hints are dropped of a growing attraction between Idaho and Paul's sister, Alia. In one scene, Duncan even kisses Alia, which infuriates her; he replies that he took no more than what was offered. When a blinded Paul abdicates and wanders into the desert to die (as is the tradition for blind Fremen), Alia asks Idaho for his continued support and affection to help her get through the times ahead.

In 1976's Children of Dune, Idaho is now Alia's husband and Mentat. She has assumed power as Holy Regent in the name of Paul's children, Leto II and Ghanima. Alia becomes possessed by the memory-ego of her ancestor, the Baron Vladimir Harkonnen, who sets out to destroy the Atreides empire. Recognizing this, Idaho remains loyal to the Atreides, and flees to the desert to protect the children. In order to get Stilgar to join the Fremen opposition to Alia's rule, Duncan kills Javid, Alia's secret lover, on the neutral ground of Sietch Tabr. He also insults Stilgar three times, by saying to him the three deadliest insults a Fremen could ever hear: "You wear a collar!", "You are a servant! You've sold Fremen for their water!" and "You have no immortality! None of your descendents carry your blood!" Duncan then allows himself to be struck down by an enraged Stilgar, who realizes afterward that Alia would be forced by political necessity to execute him and his only hope of survival is to join the Fremen rebels—which is what Duncan had planned from the beginning. Duncan's last gasping words were, "Two deaths for the Atreides. The second for no better reason than the first."

=== God Emperor of Dune ===
God Emperor of Dune (1981) reintroduces Idaho as a serial ghola: Leto II has ruled as a sandworm-human hybrid for 3,500 years, and has continually had an Idaho ghola to serve him. Beyond his personal affection for Idaho, to Leto, Idaho represents loyalty, humanity, and the spirit of the unknown, something which the God Emperor, having perfect prescience, knows nothing of. It is also implied that Duncan is needed for Leto's plan for humanity's ultimate survival — called the Golden Path — to come to fruition. However, the Idaho gholas, with their memories restored, struggle to deal with what the Atreides have become. Where before, the hallmark of Atreides rule was justice, Leto's reign has been one of godhood and oppression. Idaho's old-fashioned conscience rebels, leading the Idaho ghola to attempt to kill Leto (who as a sandworm is invulnerable to all but water and extreme violence). Leto notes that only nineteen of "his" Duncans have survived long enough to die what is considered a "natural death." In just about all of these rebellions, the Idaho ghola is killed by the God Emperor. After a certain time, the God Emperor orders another one from the Tleilaxu, or the Tleilaxu themselves just send another one as a token for their security.

The novel chronicles the perceptions and actions of a new Duncan that has just been ordered from the Tleilaxu. Like the others before him, Duncan is appalled at what Atreides rule has become, but Leto appoints him as the head of his otherwise all-female military, the Fish Speakers. Leto also reveals that he has repeatedly used his Duncan gholas in his breeding program to genetically improve the Atreides line. The current Duncan is intended to mate with Siona Atreides, the end product of Leto's breeding program: she is invisible to prescient sight. Duncan is extremely reluctant and protests, saying that he is not Leto's stud. He does catch the eye of Hwi Noree, the Ixian Ambassador sent to Arrakis with the explicit purpose of wooing the Emperor. Leto forbids Duncan from having any relations with her, but he disobeys and sleeps with Hwi.

Duncan eventually joins Siona's rebels and works with her to assassinate Leto. His plan is successful, but Hwi is killed in the process. Leto reveals that he knew of their plan, and that his death is simply another step to ensuring the Golden Path. Siona, having seen the Golden Path during her trial in the desert, realizes she was bred as a key figure for humanity's survival. At the end of the novel, she schemes on how to carefully seduce and mate with Duncan, as Leto had originally intended. None of their descendants will be traceable by prescience, ensuring that humanity can never be completely found and destroyed.

Fifteen hundred years later in Chapterhouse: Dune (1985), the Bene Gesserit Bellonda assesses the many Duncans who came before:

In the original and early gholas, his character had been dominated by impulsiveness. Quick to hate, quick to give loyalty. Later Idaho-gholas tempered this with cynicism but the underlying impulsiveness remained. The Tyrant had called it to action many times. Bellonda recognized a pattern. He can be goaded by pride. His long service to the Tyrant fascinated her. Not only had he been a Mentat several times but there was evidence he had been a Truthsayer in more than one incarnation.

Although a third party work not connected to the main Dune series, but endorsed by Herbert in his lifetime, The Dune Encyclopedia provides some background on the characteristics, personalities, and often gruesome deaths of 17 additional Duncans from the time before the Duncan that is the focus of God Emperor of Dune, further noting that there were "well over seventy Duncans".

=== Heretics of Dune and Chapterhouse: Dune ===
The Bene Gesserit become the consumers of Idaho gholas in Heretics of Dune (1984) and Chapterhouse: Dune (1985). However, the gholas are repeatedly assassinated after several years, and the Sisterhood suspect the Tleilaxu. Not knowing exactly what purpose Idaho will serve, the Bene Gesserit believe that the Tleilaxu are using the gholas to control the timing of his release upon the universe, implying some Tleilaxu purpose in addition to their own. The current ghola survives such an attempt and Miles Teg is able to restore the memories of Duncan Idaho to the ghola, but Duncan can feel that the Tleilaxu planted something else in his mind. When Murbella, an Honored Matre, tries to sexually bind Idaho to her, he entraps and enslaves her, revealing the Tleilaxu purpose: to conquer the Honored Matres by using a better version of their own sexual techniques. When Murbella tries to enslave Duncan, the Tleilaxu's plan comes to fruition, and he becomes aware of the memories of all the other Idaho gholas, though he is also imprinted to her. It is later determined that the Tleilaxu had mixed the cells from almost all of the Idaho gholas to make this one. Idaho and Murbella are confined to a no-ship on Chapterhouse. There, Idaho trains young men to go out into the universe and enslave Honored Matres. Duncan also inherits an awkward prescient vision, wherein he sees an old man and woman staring back at him. Duncan retrieves the Miles Teg ghola, and Sheeana Burg who escape in the no-ship, evading the trap set for him by the strange couple.

=== Hunters of Dune and Sandworms of Dune ===
Brian Herbert and Kevin J. Anderson continued from the original series with Hunters of Dune (2006) and Sandworms of Dune (2007), originally planned to be Dune 7 by Frank Herbert. Duncan continues his travels on the no-ship, now named the Ithaca by its passengers. He is accompanied by Miles Teg, Sheeana and a group of her Bene Gesserit sisters, the last Tleilaxu Master Scytale, and many others.

Duncan and the other refugees from Chapterhouse are still on the run from the Unknown Enemy that hunts them. They do not learn until near the end that the Enemy is the revived empire of thinking machines, and the old couple are actually the computer-entity Omnius and the robot Erasmus. In the final confrontation with Omnius, Paul Atreides (brought back as a ghola and with his power of prescience just restored), and then Norma Cenva (the Oracle of Time to the Navigators), both reveal that Duncan is the Ultimate Kwisatz Haderach; not Paul (who is an "imperfect" Kwisatz Haderach) nor any other Atreides, nor their descendants. Overwhelmed by the unexpected revelations, Duncan decides to unite humanity and the thinking machines—after Cenva permanently removes Omnius from existence—rather than bring about the absolute destruction of intelligent technology for the second time in history.

Assuming the responsibility of mediator between the two sides, and with Erasmus' willing participation (the robot being left as the leader and controlling-force of the thinking machines), Duncan does something similar to Bene Gesserit Sharing with the robot; possibly along with what seems to be a physical-bonding (similar to what Leto II did with the sandtrout) into something of a human-machine hybrid. Erasmus then voluntarily "dies", while remaining an Other Memory speaking to Duncan. In addition to being the Final Kwisatz Haderach of the humans, Duncan becomes the new evermind of the thinking machines, guiding their joint future.

=== Prelude to Dune ===
According to the Prelude to Dune prequel trilogy (1999–2001) by Brian Herbert and Kevin J. Anderson, Duncan Idaho is born on the planet Giedi Prime, under the Harkonnen Regime. His hatred for the Harkonnens is established when, at eight years of age, his parents are murdered in front of him by Glossu Rabban. Rabban subsequently chooses young Idaho to be the prey for one of his hunts, but Idaho's resourcefulness and the aid of a woman who wants to punish the Harkonnens enables him to escape Giedi Prime for the planet Caladan. Upon arriving at the Atreides palace, he becomes a stableboy at Duke Paulus Atreides' request. After Paulus' death, Idaho expresses his desire to become a Ginaz Swordmaster. In the trilogy's second installment Dune: House Harkonnen, Duncan undergoes the immense rigors needed to become a Swordmaster; he is promoted to the title, alongside a Grumman friend named Hiih Resser, and helps defeat a mob of insurgent students. At the time of Dune: House Corrino, Duncan is an instrumental part of the liberation of the planet Ix from the Sardaukar and Tleilaxu, and even manages to defeat Count Hasimir Fenring in single combat.

== In adaptations ==
In the 1984 film Dune, Duncan is played by Richard Jordan. Everett McGill, who portrays Stilgar in the film, said “I recall Richard Jordan as Duncan Idaho agreed to a smaller presence in Dune for the promise of the breakout character in Dune Messiah and beyond." Though Dune II, a planned sequel film adapting Dune Messiah, was never made, the unfinished script depicts Duncan being revived by Scytale.

James Watson portrays the character in the 2000 miniseries Frank Herbert's Dune. In the 2003 miniseries sequel Frank Herbert's Children of Dune, the ghola of Duncan (known in the novels as "Hayt") is played by Edward Atterton. Emmet Asher-Perrin of Tor.com writes that Atterton "plays the mentat ghola reincarnation of Idaho with all the upright stoicism and vulnerability that the character is owed."

In the animated television show The Grim Adventures of Billy & Mandy, the 2003–04 season episode "Mandy, the Merciless" parodies God Emperor of Dune, with the character Billy as the repeatedly killed Duncan Idaho.

The character is played by Jason Momoa in the 2021 film Dune. He is set to reprise the role in Dune: Part Three, the upcoming film adaptation of Dune Messiah.

== Family tree ==
House Atreides family tree

House Atreides
House Harkonnen
House Corrino	Baron Vladimir; Harkonnen	Tanidia Nerus (Note: The Prelude to Dune prequel series (1999–2001) establishes that Tanidia Nerus is an alias of Gaius Helen Mohiam.)
Anirul	Shaddam IV	Leto I Atreides	Lady Jessica (Note: In Dune (1965), Jessica is the concubine of Leto I, and Chani becomes the concubine of their son, Paul.)
Count Dalak; Kenola	Princess Wensicia	Princess Irulan	Paul Atreides	Chani
Josifa	Farad'n	Ghanima Atreides	Leto II Atreides	Leto II Atreides; The Elder (Note: The infant Leto II Atreides is murdered in Dune, and his brother Leto II is later also named after their grandfather, Leto I, in Children of Dune (1976).)	Duncan Idaho
Chalice	Rugi	Many generations (Note: Per God Emperor of Dune, Duncan Idaho gholas was used several times in Leto II's breeding program)	Alia Atreides	Hayt (Note: Hayt is a ghola of Duncan Idaho, a kind of clone made using his corpse.)
Moneo Atreides
Siona Atreides
Many generations
Miles Teg
Darwi Odrade
