= Paul Atreides =

Fictional character in Dune

- Dune character
- Timothée Chalamet as Paul in Dune (2021)
- First appearance: Dune (1963–65)
- Created by: Frank Herbert
- Portrayed by: Kyle MacLachlan (1984 film); Alec Newman (2000 series / 2003 sequel); Euan Morton (Macmillan Audio audiobooks, 2007–2009); Timothée Chalamet (2021 film / 2024 sequel / 2026 sequel)

In-universe information
- Alias: Usul
- Title: Padishah Emperor
- Occupation: Mentat
- Affiliation: Fremen
- Family: House Atreides
- Spouse: Princess Irulan
- Significant other: Chani (concubine)
- Children: Leto; Leto II Atreides; Ghanima Atreides
- Relatives: Leto I Atreides (father); Lady Jessica (mother); Alia Atreides (sister); Vladimir Harkonnen (grandfather); Tanidia Nerus (grandmother); Prequels: Paulus Atreides (grandfather); Helena Richese (grandmother); Gaius Helen Mohiam

Paul Atreides (/əˈtreɪɪdiːz/; later known as Paul Muad'Dib, and later still as The Preacher) is a fictional character in the Dune universe created by Frank Herbert. He is a main character in the first two novels in the series, Dune (1965) and Dune Messiah (1969), and returns in Children of Dune (1976). The character is brought back as two different gholas (clones) in the Brian Herbert and Kevin J. Anderson novels which conclude the original series, Hunters of Dune (2006) and Sandworms of Dune (2007), and appears in the prequels Paul of Dune (2008) and The Winds of Dune (2009). According to Brian Herbert, Frank Herbert's son and biographer, House Atreides was based on the heroic but ill-fated Greek mythological house of Atreus.

A primary theme of Dune and its sequels is Frank Herbert's warning about society's tendencies to "give over every decision-making capacity" to a charismatic leader. He said in 1979, "The bottom line of the Dune trilogy is: beware of heroes. Much better [to] rely on your own judgment, and your own mistakes." Paul rises to leadership through military strategy and political maneuvering, but his superhuman powers and ability to fit himself into pre-existing religious infrastructure allow him to force himself upon mankind as their messiah. As "Muad'Dib", Paul becomes the central figure of a new religion, and reluctantly unleashes a bloody jihad in his name across the universe. Paul struggles with the idea of potentially seizing divine control over his newly minted empire, but by following the path of his destiny, he escapes from the burden of it. He lets an assassination plot against him play out, blinding him, and follows the Fremen tradition of the blind going out into the desert to die. The burden of the empire is then placed upon Paul's sister Alia, and his children Leto II and Ghanima. Paul later reappears as the Preacher, seeking to end the religion founded around him, but is assassinated.

Paul Atreides has been successively performed by Kyle MacLachlan in David Lynch's 1984 film adaptation, by Alec Newman in the 2000 Dune miniseries and its 2003 sequel, by Euan Morton in the Audie Award-winning audiobook adaptations produced by Macmillan Audio (2007–2009), and by Timothée Chalamet in the 2021 Denis Villeneuve film Dune and its sequels, Dune: Part Two and Dune: Part Three.

== Appearances ==
=== Dune ===
The son of Duke Leto Atreides and the Lady Jessica, Paul is the heir of House Atreides, an aristocratic family that rules the planet Caladan. Jessica is a Bene Gesserit and an important key in the Bene Gesserit breeding program. According to the breeding program, she was to produce a daughter, who would be bred with Feyd-Rautha, a nephew of Baron Vladimir Harkonnen. However, Jessica falls in love with Leto and grants him the son he desires. Although Paul is a boy, Jessica gives him some training in the Bene Gesserit ways, including enhanced observation and the Sisterhood's specialized martial art. Initially described as "small for his age", Paul has secretly undergone the early Mentat training, and is also schooled in weapon use by Gurney Halleck and Duncan Idaho.

In Dune (1965), Paul is fifteen years old; the Padishah Emperor Shaddam IV orders the family to leave Caladan and govern the desert planet Arrakis (known as Dune), though Paul's father Duke Leto is in full knowledge that the Emperor is colluding with House Harkonnen to destroy House Atreides as a perceived threat to the throne. On Dune, the family is betrayed by their Suk doctor, Wellington Yueh. He disables the House defensive shields, allowing the Imperial Sardaukar troops, dressed in Harkonnen uniforms, to capture Duke Leto and Thufir Hawat and to kill most of the Atreides army. Duncan sacrifices himself while attempting to hold off the Sardaukar and ensures Paul's escape. His betrayal motivated by the Baron's capture and torture of his Bene Gesserit wife, Yueh implants a poisonous gas capsule concealed within a false tooth on Duke Leto after his capture and instructs Leto to use it to kill the Baron. Shortly afterward, the Baron has Yueh murdered. Upon meeting Baron Harkonnen and his twisted Mentat Piter De Vries, Leto bites down on the capsule. He succeeds in killing De Vries—and himself—but not the Baron. Fed a poison for which only the Baron has the antidote, Hawat is forced to serve as the new Harkonnen Mentat. With some help from Yueh, Paul and Jessica escape into the desert.

They flee to the Fremen, who see in Paul the Lisan al-Gaib or "the Voice from the Outer World", a prophet they call the Mahdi whom they believe is "The One Who Will Lead Us to Paradise". Paul and Jessica take shelter in Sietch Tabr, a Fremen settlement led by the naib, Stilgar. Paul and his mother train the Fremen in weapon use and martial arts, creating a formidable army. When Paul is accepted into the Fremen tribe, he is given the secret "sietch name" Usul, the Fremen word meaning "the base of the pillar". He chooses "Paul Muad'Dib" as his common name of manhood, to be used openly. Muad'Dib is the name of the adapted kangaroo mouse of Arrakis, and Stilgar relates that Paul's choice pleases the Fremen:

Muad'Dib is wise in the ways of the desert. Muad'Dib creates his own water. Muad'Dib hides from the sun and travels in the cool night. Muad'Dib is fruitful and multiplies over the land. Muad'Dib we call 'instructor-of-boys.' That is a powerful base on which to build your life, Paul Muad'Dib, who is Usul among us.

Paul leads a Fremen campaign of resistance against Harkonnen rule. He and Chani, daughter of Liet-Kynes, take each other as mates and produce a son, named Leto in honor of Paul's father. Paul also reunites with Gurney Halleck, who had sought refuge with smugglers after the Harkonnen attack. In a bid to unlock his latent powers, Paul undergoes the process of spice agony via the consumption of the Water of Life. He survives, although barely, and the ordeal gives him knowledge of his male and female ancestors; this proves Paul is the Kwisatz Haderach.

Awakening, Paul launches an attack on the Harkonnen and Imperial troops with his Fremen army (and with his personal squad of bodyguards, the Fedaykin), riding the enormous sandworms indigenous to the planet. In the attack, he learns that his son Leto has been killed in a Sardaukar raid. They win and Paul requests an audience with Shaddam IV. He threatens to destroy the spice melange, thus making transport between the planets impossible and effectively destroying civilization. In return for preserving the spice, he requires the hand of the Emperor's daughter, the Bene Gesserit-trained Princess Irulan as well as the Emperor's abdication in favor of Paul. Urged by the Spacing Guild, Shaddam accepts his terms.

=== Dune Messiah ===
In Dune Messiah (1969), Paul has been Emperor for twelve years. His jihad has killed sixty-one billion people across the known universe, but according to his prescient vision, this is a fate far better than what he has seen. Paul is beleaguered by a need he sees—to set humanity on a course that does not lead to stagnation and destruction, while at the same time managing both the Empire and the religion built around him.

A Fremen conspiracy attempts to assassinate Paul using a stone burner. The attempt fails, but the effects of the weapon destroy Paul's eyes. Although he becomes physically blind, his prescience allows him to "see" by tightly locking in reality with his prescient visions. Despondent as a result of his prescience, Paul faces another assassination attempt by a conspiracy of the Bene Tleilax, the Bene Gesserit and the Spacing Guild. This attempt, made using a ghola (a resurrected clone) of Paul's friend and mentor Duncan Idaho also fails, but the ordeal seemingly helps the Duncan ghola to regain his memories. At the same time, Chani dies in childbirth, bearing twins: a boy, Leto II, and a girl, Ghanima (which means "spoil of war"). Paul, who did not foresee the birth of twins, loses his prescience after Chani's death and becomes truly blind, although he conceals this. With a knife over the babies, the Tleilaxu Scytale offers to make a ghola of Chani and restore her to life, in exchange for all of Paul's CHOAM holdings and his effective abdication from the throne. However Paul, seeing through his newborn son's eyes, kills Scytale. Immediately afterwards, the dwarf Tleilaxu Master Bijaz makes the same offer regarding the Chani ghola; Paul orders Duncan to kill Bijaz. The blind Paul then walks into the desert to die alone, in accordance with Fremen law. He leaves his children in the care of the Fremen, with Paul's sister Alia set to rule the empire as regent.

=== Children of Dune ===
In Children of Dune (1976), a mysterious figure known as The Preacher emerges from the desert and preaches among the people of Arrakis. Led around by a boy, he discredits the religion that has been built around Paul Atreides, saying, "The religion of Muad'Dib is not Muad'Dib", and scorns Alia. It is strongly suggested that he is indeed Paul, which is confirmed when he walks past Alia and says, "Stop trying to pull me into the background once more, sister." Paul meets with his son Leto in the desert. They have both seen mankind's future extinction in their prescient vision; Paul had been unable to face the terrible sacrifice necessary to avoid this future, and hopes Leto will enjoy his life rather than take that path. Leto has decided otherwise, and soon begins the long transformation into a sandworm. Back in Arrakeen, Paul (as the Preacher) speaks out against Alia to the crowd outside Alia's Temple; his words and the actions of Leto cause a riot. Reacting to his blasphemy, Alia's priests rush forward and stab Paul to death, as Alia and the remaining Atreides watch from above.

Over 3,500 years later in God Emperor of Dune (1981), Leto still rules the universe as the Tyrant. The ego-personas of Paul and Leto's other ancestors "live" within his Other Memory.

=== Later works ===
At the end of Frank Herbert's sixth and last book in the Dune series, Chapterhouse: Dune (1985), a ghola of Scytale is seemingly the only Tleilaxu Master left alive. He secretly possesses a nullentropy capsule containing cells carefully and secretly collected by the Tleilaxu for millennia, including cells from Paul himself.

In Brian Herbert and Kevin J. Anderson's Hunters of Dune, the 2006 sequel to Chapterhouse: Dune, Scytale is a prisoner on the no-ship Ithaca, at the mercy of the latest Duncan Idaho ghola and a rebel group of Bene Gesserit. Nearing death from advanced age, a desperate Scytale trades his precious cell samples for permission to grow his own ghola; Duncan and the Bene Gesserit group subsequently grow gholas of Paul, Chani, Jessica, and others. Meanwhile, the independent Face Dancer Khrone obtains Paul's genetic material from a religious relic on Caladan and tasks his Lost Tleilaxu prisoner Uxtal to create his own ghola of Paul. Named Paolo, this ghola is to be "conditioned" by Khrone's sadistic ghola of Baron Harkonnen to become a twisted version of Paul, who will serve the shadowy needs of Krone's mysterious masters, Daniel and Marty.

In Sandworms of Dune (2007), the young Paul ghola ultimately duels Paolo. Paul is mortally wounded, but the trauma restores his original memories and he manages to heal himself. A power-hungry Paolo overdoses on ultraspice, an incredibly potent form of melange, and falls into a catatonic state. Later on the recovering planet Dune, the awakened gholas of Paul and Chani have reverted to the ways of the ancient Fremen, resolving to lead simple lives and restore the planet to its former glory. Paul reaffirms his love for Chani, telling her he has loved her for five thousand years.

Paul's birth is featured in the Brian Herbert/Kevin J. Anderson prequel novel Dune: House Corrino (2001). The 2008 novel Paul of Dune explores both Paul's childhood before Dune and his life between the novels Dune and Dune Messiah. Brian Herbert and Anderson's The Winds of Dune (2009) also relates events from Paul's youth and the period before Dune Messiah.

=== Parody ===
In the Dune parody novels National Lampoon's Doon by Ellis Weiner (1984) and Head-Space (2016) by Tom Fowler, Paul is spoofed as "Pall Agamemnides" and "Morty'Dyb", respectively.

== Analysis ==
According to novelist Brian Herbert, Frank Herbert's son and biographer, House Atreides was based on the heroic but ill-fated Greek mythological House Atreus. Noting that the characters in Dune fit mythological archetypes, Brian Herbert wrote that "Paul is the hero prince on a quest who weds the daughter of a 'king'". A primary theme of Dune and its sequels is Frank Herbert's warning about society's tendencies to "give over every decision-making capacity" to a charismatic leader. He said in 1979, "The bottom line of the Dune trilogy is: beware of heroes. Much better rely on your own judgment, and your own mistakes." He wrote in 1985, "Dune was aimed at this whole idea of the infallible leader because my view of history says that mistakes made by a leader (or made in a leader's name) are amplified by the numbers who follow without question." In a 1970 interview, Herbert noted that the character of Paul was constructed to express "the conflict between absolutes and the necessity of the moment". Brian Herbert wrote:

Paul Atreides (who is the messianic "Muad'Dib" to the Fremen) resembles Lawrence of Arabia (T. E. Lawrence), a British citizen who led Arab forces in a successful desert revolt against the Turks during World War I. Lawrence employed guerrilla tactics to destroy enemy forces and communication lines, and came close to becoming a messiah figure for the Arabs. This historical event led Frank Herbert to consider the possibility of an outsider leading native forces against the morally corrupt occupiers of a desert world, in the process becoming a godlike figure to them.

The similarity to T.E. Lawrence was reinforced within the novel Dune Messiah, in which a chapter heading-quotation is taken from a post-conquest work of Paul's, with the title The Seven Pillars of the Universe. This appears to have been inspired by Lawrence's account of his war-time activities in the desert, titled Seven Pillars of Wisdom.

Throughout Paul's rise to superhuman status, he follows a plotline common to many stories describing the birth of a hero. He has unfortunate circumstances forced onto him, and after a long period of hardship and exile, he confronts and defeats the source of evil in his tale. As such, Dune is representative of a general trend beginning in 1960s American science fiction in that it features a character who attains godlike status through scientific means. Paul's riding and controlling a giant sandworm cements him as a Fremen leader, and he eventually gains a level of omniscience which leads to his accession to the Imperial throne and causes the Fremen to worship him like a god.

Juan A. Prieto-Pablos says Herbert achieves a new typology with Paul's superpowers, differentiating the heroes of Dune from earlier heroes such as Superman, A. E. van Vogt's Gilbert Gosseyn, and Henry Kuttner's telepaths. Unlike previous superheroes who acquire their powers suddenly and accidentally, Paul's are the result of "painful and slow personal progress". And unlike other superheroes of the 1960s—who are the exception among ordinary people in their respective worlds—Herbert's characters grow their powers through "the application of mystical philosophies and techniques". For Herbert, the ordinary person can develop incredible fighting skills (Fremen and Sardaukar) or mental abilities (Bene Gesserit and Mentats).

Denis Villeneuve, director and co-writer of the 2021 film adaptation Dune, compared Paul to the character Michael Corleone in The Godfather, explaining that "He's training to be the Duke. But as much as he's been prepared and trained for that role, is it really what he dreams to be? That's the contradiction of that character. It's like Michael Corleone in The Godfather–it's someone that has a very tragic fate and he will become something that he was not wishing to become."

The Egyptian-Canadian commentator Khalid M. Baheyeldin has enumerated the obviously Islamic concepts and references appearing in Dune, to the level of finding multiple similarities between the career of Herbert's Paul Atreides and that of the Islamic prophet Muhammad. Beyond the obvious general resemblance—both Muhammad and Atreides found a powerful new religion, energizing hitherto disregarded desert-dwellers to topple an old empire and build a new one—Baheyeldin noted various specific similarities between Muhammad's career and that of Atreides.

== In adaptations ==
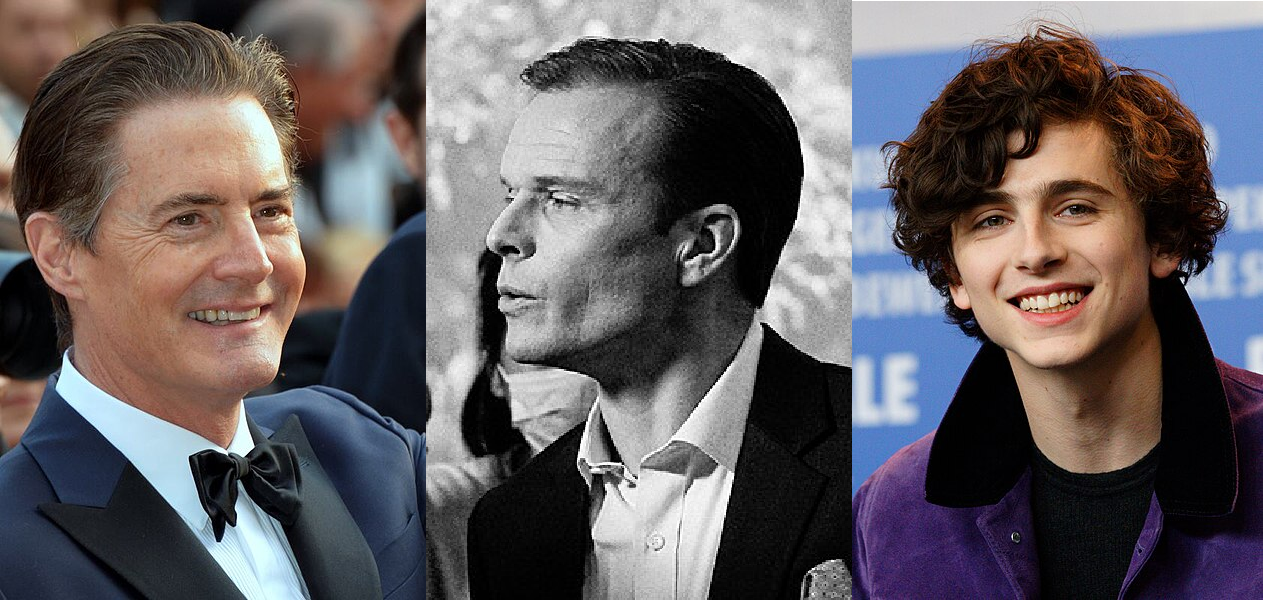
Paul Atreides has been portrayed by three actors: Kyle MacLachlan (1984), Alec Newman (2000/2003), and Timothée Chalamet (2021/2024/2026)

Paul is portrayed by Kyle MacLachlan in David Lynch's 1984 film adaptation, and by Alec Newman in the 2000 Dune miniseries and its 2003 sequel. The character is played by Timothée Chalamet in the 2021 Denis Villeneuve film Dune, its 2024 sequel, Dune: Part Two, and the upcoming third film, Dune: Part Three. The character is also voiced by Euan Morton in the Audie Award-winning audiobook adaptations of Frank Herbert's original Dune series, produced by Macmillan Audio.

Richard Corliss of Time notes that "MacLachlan, 25, grows impressively in the role; his features, soft and spoiled at the beginning, take on a he-manly glamour once he assumes his mission." Lynch and producer Raffaella De Laurentiis specifically wanted to cast an unknown actor in the role of Paul, and began a nationwide search. Casting scout Elizabeth Leusting found MacLachlan, who had been performing in the Oregon Shakespeare Festival.

Laura Fries of Variety writes that "Newman, as the sour Paul, sticks to just one note". Emmet Asher-Perrin of Tor.com suggested that the choice to cast adult actor Newman as Paul is problematic because the character is written in the script as less mature and observant than he is in the source novel.

Chalamet received strong praise for his portrayal in the 2021 film. Ben Travis of Empire wrote, "Among the uniformly excellent performances, Timothée Chalamet holds his own in his first blockbuster leading role. In a film this size, there's every chance he'd get swallowed up by the sandworm-like enormity of everything around him—but even against the colossal spectacle, the magnetic charisma he displayed in smaller indie fare shines through." Pete Hammond of Deadline Hollywood called Chalamet "perfectly cast" and wrote that he plays the role "earnestly and effectively". Reviewing the 2024 sequel, Lovia Gyarke of The Hollywood Reporter wrote, "Chalamet sheds the boyish innocence of the first film for a darker, more complicated persona."

Villeneuve described Chalamet portraying Paul, "There's a deep intelligence in the eyes, and he has an old soul. When you talk with Tim, you get the impression that he's lived many lives. Yet he looks so young on camera. So that contrast of someone who has a lot of experience but is in the middle of his teenage years is Paul." Chalamet's Paul is described as "spindly", and has "inward-looking sorrow". He is portrayed as "a boy-man [with] the patrician bone structure of an imperial hemophiliac". With Paul being 15 years old in the novel, The New York Times said, "Chalamet looks young enough for the role... and can certainly strike a Byronic pose, complete with black coat and anguished hair." Slate wrote, "Chalamet, at 28 still convincing as a juvenile, seems to have been born to play this ambivalent prince."

The character is also featured in the 1992 video game Dune from Cryo Interactive/Virgin Interactive, and the 2001 3D video game Frank Herbert's Dune by Cryo Interactive/DreamCatcher Interactive. Paul and Chani were both added to Fortnite Battle Royale in October 2021. Paul also appears as a playable Operator in Call of Duty: Modern Warfare III and Call of Duty: Warzone 2.0, alongside Feyd-Rautha Harkonnen, in December 2023.

== Audiobooks ==
Macmillan Audio produced full-cast audiobook adaptations of Frank Herbert's Dune novels. Scottish actor Euan Morton voices Paul Atreides in the adaptations of Dune (2007) and Dune Messiah (2007), and is also part of the ensemble cast of Chapterhouse: Dune (2009). All three productions feature a full ensemble cast with sound effects and musical scoring. The Dune audiobook won the Audie Award for Science Fiction in 2008 and received the AudioFile Earphones Award; it was also a finalist in the Audie Award categories for Multi-Voiced Performance and Achievement in Production. As of June 2026, nearly nineteen years after their release, Dune and Dune Messiah continue to rank among the best sellers on the Audible Best Sellers chart for Space Opera Science Fiction, with Dune reaching #2.

== Merchandising ==
A line of Dune action figures from toy company LJN was released to lackluster sales in 1984. Styled after David Lynch's film, the collection featured a figure of Paul, as well as other characters. In October 2019, Funko announced a "Dune Classic" line of POP! vinyl figures, one of which would be Paul in a stillsuit, styled after Lynch's film. Paul appears in the 1979 Avalon Hill board game Dune, the 1984 Parker Brothers game Dune, and the 1997 collectible card game Dune.

== Family tree ==
House Atreides family tree

House Atreides
House Harkonnen
House Corrino | Baron Vladimir; Harkonnen | Tanidia Nerus (Note: The Prelude to Dune prequel series (1999–2001) establishes that Tanidia Nerus is an alias of Gaius Helen Mohiam.)
Anirul | Shaddam IV | Leto I Atreides | Lady Jessica (Note: In Dune (1965), Jessica is the concubine of Leto I, and Chani becomes the concubine of their son, Paul.)
Count Dalak; Kenola | Princess Wensicia | Princess Irulan | Paul Atreides | Chani
Josifa | Farad'n | Ghanima Atreides | Leto II Atreides | Leto II Atreides; The Elder (Note: The infant Leto II Atreides is murdered in Dune, and his brother Leto II is later also named after their grandfather, Leto I, in Children of Dune (1976).) | Duncan Idaho
Chalice | Rugi | Many generations (Note: Per God Emperor of Dune, Duncan Idaho gholas was used several times in Leto II's breeding program) | Alia Atreides | Hayt (Note: Hayt is a ghola of Duncan Idaho, a kind of clone made using his corpse.)
Moneo Atreides
Siona Atreides
Many generations
Miles Teg
Darwi Odrade
