= Frank Herbert's Children of Dune =

Television series

- DVD cover
- Based on: Dune Messiah and Children of Dune by Frank Herbert
- Screenplay by: John Harrison
- Directed by: Greg Yaitanes
- Starring: James McAvoy; Alec Newman; Julie Cox; Daniela Amavia; Alice Krige; Susan Sarandon; Tim Thorne
- Music by: Brian Tyler
- Original language: English

Production
- Cinematography: Arthur Reinhart
- Running time: 266 minutes
- Production companies: Blixa Film Produktion GmbH & Co. KG; New Amsterdam Entertainment
- Budget: $20 million

Original release
- Network: Sci Fi Channel
- Release: March 16 – March 26, 2003

Related
- Frank Herbert's Dune

Frank Herbert's Children of Dune is a three-part science fiction television miniseries written by John Harrison and directed by Greg Yaitanes, based on Frank Herbert's novels Dune Messiah (1969) and Children of Dune (1976). First broadcast in the United States on March 16, 2003, Children of Dune is the sequel to the 2000 miniseries Frank Herbert's Dune (based on Herbert's 1965 novel Dune), and was produced by the Sci Fi Channel. Children of Dune and its predecessor are among the highest-rated programs ever to be broadcast on the Sci-Fi Channel. In 2003, Children of Dune won a Primetime Emmy Award for Outstanding Special Visual Effects, and was nominated for three additional Emmys.

Children of Dune is the first filmed adaptation of Dune's sequel novels, preceding Denis Villeneuve's film adaptation of Dune Messiah (2026).

== Plot ==
=== Part One: Messiah ===
Twelve years have passed since Paul Atreides became Emperor at the end of Frank Herbert's Dune by seizing control of the planet Arrakis and forcing a union with the former Emperor's daughter, the Princess Irulan. Paul's Fremen armies have since launched several bloody jihads to solidify his position. Deposed Emperor Shaddam IV and the rest of his family are exiled to Salusa Secundus, where his other daughter, Princess Wensicia plots to restore House Corrino to power. The Bene Gesserit, the Spacing Guild, and the Tleilaxu also plot to overthrow Paul's reign, aided even by rebel Fremen, who hate how Paul's terraforming project is changing Arrakis and the traditional Fremen way of life. The Tleilaxu present Paul with a ghola in the likeness of his friend Duncan Idaho, killed during the events of Dune but secretly conditioned to assassinate Paul when triggered by certain words.

Though his prescient abilities reveal the dangers ahead, Paul allows the conspiracies to succeed to avoid even worse consequences. He is attacked with a type of nuclear weapon called a stone burner and blinded, but still manages to "see" by following his prescient visions. Later, Paul's concubine Chani gives birth to twins at a Fremen sietch but dies soon afterward. In Paul's absence, his sister Alia purges the imperial city of the enemies of House Atreides. Paul says the words that trigger Duncan's conditioning, but the trauma of potentially killing Paul breaks his programming and unlocks the memories of his original incarnation. The Tleilaxu Face Dancer Scytale offers this as proof that the Tleilaxu can bring Chani back to life if Paul agrees to their terms. Paul is tempted, but the unique nature of the infants (who, like Alia, were "pre-born") allows him to see through the eyes of his son and kill Scytale. Following the Fremen tradition of abandoning the blind to the sandworms, Paul walks alone into the desert. His legacy secured, the twins and their future empire are left in the care of Alia.

=== Part Two: The Children ===
Paul's and Chani's children Leto II and Ghanima are now young adults; Princess Irulan has protected their interests as her own. Now married to Duncan, Alia is still regent of Paul's empire and official guardian of the children. Irulan's sister Wensicia yearns for a return to power through her son, Farad'n. After a long absence, Paul and Alia's mother, Lady Jessica arrives on Arrakis to visit her family, but Alia fears that Jessica has resumed her allegiance to the Bene Gesserit and may be plotting against her. An individual known as "The Preacher" has surfaced in the capital, speaking against the decline of Muad'Dib's religion into empty rituals; Alia resists having him killed because she shares the popular belief that he may be a returned Paul.

Alia possesses the memories and personalities of her ancestors due to being pre-born but has trouble controlling them; her internal struggles against the assertive voices manifest themselves in the form of paranoia and self-destructive behavior. The persona of the evil Baron Vladimir Harkonnen, Alia's maternal grandfather whom she had killed, begins to influence her and threatens to overtake Alia's consciousness altogether. Jessica senses that Alia has become dangerous and advises Irulan to spirit Leto and Ghanima away to safety. Later, after an assassination attempt on her, Jessica seeks sanctuary with Fremen dissidents. Wearing clothes presented to them by Wensicia, the twins escape into the deep desert but are soon cornered in a deadly trap of her devising.

=== Part Three: The Golden Path ===
Wensicia's plot to assassinate the Atreides heirs fails but provides Leto an opportunity to fake his death and buy time to overcome Alia, whose madness reaches its peak. Baron Harkonnen's grip on her consciousness strengthens and a civil war brews with the rebel Fremen. Leto returns from the deep desert, where he bonds himself with sandtrout, the larval form of Arrakis' sandworms, to acquire a partial carapace granting the superhuman speed, strength, and invulnerability of the sandworms themselves.

To force the neutral Fremen leader Stilgar to lead the rebels, Duncan murders Alia's lover Javid in Stilgar's sietch. As he predicts, Stilgar kills him in revenge and comes out in opposition to Alia. Leto encounters the Preacher, whose identity as his father is revealed. Leto's prescient visions have convinced him that he must lead mankind along "the Golden Path" to ensure humanity's ultimate survival. The Preacher / Muad'dib admits that he saw the same path with his own prescient vision but he refused to take it, horrified at the sacrifices it would entail for him and humanity. Leto is vindicated by pointing out to his father that he also saw this is the only possible path that avoids humanity's extinction.

With a political marriage arranged by Jessica between Ghanima and Wensicia's son Farad'n, the Corrino heir identifies his mother as the mastermind behind Leto's apparent death. Alia has Wensicia imprisoned but Ghanima accepts Farad'n's gesture as honest. With Stilgar's forces moving in, father and son return to the capital city of Arrakeen, where the Preacher makes a final speech denouncing Alia and his own religion, and is fatally stabbed by a rebel Fremen. Leto confronts Alia at Ghanima's wedding and defeats her. Alia then takes her own life, rather than be controlled by the Baron, and dies in her mother's arms. After handing Alia's water and his father's ring to Stilgar, Leto disappears into the desert. In the final scene, Ghanima tells Farad'n that while he will not be her husband due to politics, they may yet fall in love and how she pities her brother for the solitude and suffering he will endure in the millennia that he must live for the sake of humanity.

== Main cast ==
- Alec Newman as Paul "Muad'Dib" Atreides / The Preacher
- Julie Cox as Princess Irulan
- Edward Atterton as Duncan Idaho
- Ian McNeice as Baron Vladimir Harkonnen
- Barbora Kodetová as Chani
- Steven Berkoff as Stilgar
- Daniela Amavia as Alia Atreides
- P. H. Moriarty as Gurney Halleck
- Alice Krige (Note: Harrison has stated in interviews that Krige was his first choice to play Jessica in the original miniseries, but she was unavailable and Saskia Reeves won the role. Krige was cast for the sequel miniseries when Reeves was unavailable.) as Lady Jessica
- Susan Sarandon as Princess Wensicia
- James McAvoy as Leto II Atreides
- Jessica Brooks as Ghanima Atreides
- Jonathan Brüün as Farad'n
- Rik Young as Javid
- Martin McDougall as Scytale
- Gee Williams as Bijaz
- Jakob Schwarz as Otheym
- Klára Issová as Lichna
- Zuzana Geislerová as Reverend Mother Gaius Helen Mohiam
- Karel Dobrý as Korba

== Development ==
Acquiring the television rights to Frank Herbert's original six Dune novels, executive producer Richard P. Rubinstein envisioned the complex material adapted in a miniseries format, as he had done previously with Stephen King's The Stand and The Langoliers. He told The New York Times in 2003, "I have found there's a wonderful marriage to be had between long, complicated books and the television mini-series. There are some books that just can't be squeezed into a two-hour movie." Around the same time Rubenstein was first developing the material, the Sci Fi Channel's president, Bonnie Hammer, was spearheading a campaign for the channel to produce "blockbuster miniseries on a regular basis". Frank Herbert's Dune was the first in 2000, followed by Steven Spielberg's Taken in 2002, and Frank Herbert's Children of Dune and Battlestar Galactica in 2003.

Rubenstein called his two Dune miniseries "science fiction for people who don't ordinarily like science fiction" and suggested that "the Dune saga tends to appeal to women in part because it features powerful female characters". Actress Sarandon agreed, saying "One of the reasons I always loved the books was because they were driven by strong women, living outside the rules." She added that the Dune series "is very apropos to some of what's going on in the world today. It's about the dangers of fundamentalism and the idea that absolute power corrupts." Sarandon said of portraying Wensicia, "it's always fun to play a smart villain."

== Adaptation ==
After production completed on the first miniseries (and before its broadcast), the Sci Fi Channel contracted writer/director Harrison to write a sequel. Harrison's idea for the next instalment was to combine Frank Herbert's subsequent novels, Dune Messiah and Children of Dune. He has said in interviews that he believed both novels to be two parts of the same story, which essentially concludes the story of House Atreides. The three-part, six-hour miniseries covers the bulk of the plot of Dune Messiah in the first installment, and adapts Children of Dune in the second and third parts.

Greg Yaitanes directed the miniseries.

== Soundtrack ==
The series' score, containing 36 tracks, was written by Brian Tyler in a span of one month, and is considered one of Tyler's best scores. The music has been reused in several theatrical trailers, including Master and Commander: The Far Side of the World, The Chronicles of Narnia: The Lion, The Witch and The Wardrobe, Cinderella Man, Kung Fu Panda, The Golden Compass, Indiana Jones and the Kingdom of the Crystal Skull, and Star Trek.

The lyrics of the track "Inama Nushif" are sung by Azam Ali. According to Yaitanes, Tyler claimed that he pieced the lyrics together from excerpts of the Fremen language that appear throughout the Dune series of novels, and that the title translates as "She is Eternal". However, the lyrics are in fact an alteration of text published in The Dune Encyclopedia (1984), a companion book not written by Herbert.

== Reception ==
Laura Fries of Variety cited the complexity of Herbert's novels and called the adaptation "decidedly more accessible—even if that means more soaplike". Melanie McFarland of the Seattle Post-Intelligencer called the miniseries "exciting to watch", adding that "common couch potatoes will delight in the show's dark operatics, especially when cloaked in exquisite special effects" and that "Herbert devotees should be pleased with the outcome". McFarland noted that, though complex, "Children of Dune doesn't feel weighed down by its ponderous story line, where its predecessor did". Ron Wertheimer of The New York Times wrote, "Subtlety? Nuance? No and no. The plot ... doesn't always make sense. The film ... unfolds more as a pageant than as a coherent narrative." Emmet Asher-Perrin of Tor.com wrote that "there are ways in which this sequel series outstrips the initial series entirely." She praised the "clever changes" made to the plot, in particular the removal of Irulan from the conspiracy against Paul, and the expansion of Wensicia's role. But Asher-Perrin also criticized the first installment, blaming the lack of plot and difficult-to-adapt themes in Dune Messiah. Matthew Jackson of Syfy wrote in 2024 that because of the source novels' complex plots, "Children of Dune is somewhat streamlined as a miniseries, and some of the weirder elements are smoothed over or ditched entirely in order to make the story a bit more straightforward for audiences that aren't necessarily Herbert devotees. Still, the propulsive plotting that made the original miniseries work is still there, and the sequel boasts an even more impressive set of stars".

According to Fries, "It's Susan Sarandon and Alice Krige who steal the thunder as opposing matriarchs of the great royal houses. Although the two never catfight, their ongoing struggle to rule the Dune dynasty gives this mini a real kick." Observing that Sarandon and Krige were "clearly relishing their roles", Fries added that "Sarandon makes a formidable enemy, while Krige, traditionally cast as the villain, proves she can work both sides of the moral fence." McFarland concurred, writing "[Sarandon's] princess may be the villain, cooking up deadly schemes, but we're right along with her in having a good time." Stating that the acting "is at best utilitarian, the universally attractive performers embody attributes, not people", Wertheimer added:

The exception is the piece's token movie star ... Susan Sarandon, having a high old time as the villain. Looking swell in slinky gowns and a collection of outer-space-deco headgear fitted with sensual silver antennas, Ms. Sarandon nearly winks into the camera. Her body language, her purring tone, the gleam in her evil eye, the curve of her evil eyebrow all declare, "Isn't this a hoot?" In another film, such a jarring note from a principal would sink it. But she's right; this is a hoot. Her mugging is part of the fun.

While Fries continues that "the mini picks up a great deal of charisma when McAvoy and Brooks come aboard as the next generation of the house of Atreides" and that "Amavia and Cox as the tortured Alia and the put-upon Irulan offer layered performances", she also adds that "Newman, as the sour Paul, sticks to just one note". McFarland writes, Children of Dune's only annoyance is in the cast's insistence upon inexpressive acting. Fear may be the mind killer, but in this show power serves emotional strychnine—the more royal the character, the stiffer the expression. Asher-Perrin cited several "moments of perfect execution", including Alia's death and the coded conversation between Irulan and Mohiam, and praised the costumes. Fries also praised the miniseries' costumes and visual effects, and Wertheimer wrote, "The best qualities of the earlier film are matched in its successor: the eye-filling vistas, the over-the-top sets and costumes, the nifty effects, all of them light years beyond standard made-for-television fare." McFarland agreed, writing "What really keeps you engaged are Ernest Farino's special effects. He won an Emmy for his efforts on Dune, and tops that accomplishment here. The visuals are so incredible they demand a large screen viewing."

As of 2007, Frank Herbert's Children of Dune and its predecessor Frank Herbert's Dune were two of the three highest-rated programs ever to be broadcast on the Sci-Fi Channel.

=== Awards and nominations ===
Frank Herbert's Children of Dune won the Primetime Emmy Award for Outstanding Special Visual Effects for a Miniseries, Movie or a Special in 2003. The miniseries was also nominated for Emmys for Outstanding Sound Editing for a Miniseries, Movie or a Special, Outstanding Hairstyling for a Limited Series or Movie, and Outstanding Makeup for a Limited Series or Movie (Non-Prosthetic).
