= James Watson (actor) =

British film and television actor (born 1970)

- Born: 16 April 1970 (age 56); Glasgow, Scotland
- Years active: 1988-present

James (Jimmy) Watson (born 16 April 1970 in Glasgow, Scotland, UK) is a British film and television actor.

He trained at the Drama Studio London and at the Focus Theatre Studio, Dublin. Started his acting career playing Dr. John McEwan in the Irish television soap opera Fair City in 1988. His most important role yet may be that of the swordmaster Duncan Idaho in the American TV miniseries Frank Herbert's Dune in 2000.

He founded the Actor's Bothy at the CCA and co-founded Celtic Mouse Productions (Ireland). He has produced five short films, two of which were short listed for Oscar consideration. Directing credits include Sixteen Words for Water (nominated for an Irish Times Theatre Award), "Breathe" (short film) and "The Playboy Interviews" (art installation film for the Douglas Hyde Gallery, Dublin).

== Filmography ==
- The Undertow (2024), Bus Driver - TV Series
- Department Q (2024), Reporter 1 - TV Series
- Fair City (1988), Dr John McEwan - TV Series
- Before I Sleep (1997), patient
- Biological Maintenance Department (1997), Jim
- The Mystic Knights of Tir Na Nog (1998), Tidgh
- Blind Date (1999), Brien
- Frank Herbert's Dune (2000), Duncan Idaho
- The Hawk & the Dove (2001), Michael
- If Silence Should End (2002), Malcolm
- King Jamie and the Angel (2002), soldier
- Prince William (2002), Sqiggy Clavell - TV
- The Winter Warrior (2002), Fingal
- The Bone Hunter (2003), Fingal
- Red Rose (2004), Lewars
- Summer Solstice (2005), Dominic
- A Woman in Winter (2005), taxi driver
- Take 3 Girls (2006), bouncer
- Book of Blood (2008), Jimmy - Matador
- Last Hand (2008), One - BBC
- Life of Riley (2008), bus driver - BBC
- My Family (2008), police sergeant - BBC
- Happy Holidays (2009), groom - F'n'G
- River City (2009), Alain - BBC

== Theatre ==
- Gagarin Way (2007), Gary
- What Every Woman Knows (2007), David
- The Black Water (2008), Martin
- Red Diesel (2008), Chris - reading
- LIFE as Duggie
- Sticks and Stones, Jordon Doyle
- Writers in Progress II, Various
- MacGregor, Argyll
- Trainspotting, Renton
- Mysteries 2000, Jesus
- Europe, Morocco
- Making Love to Yorick, Man
- Dark Places, Brian
- Trade me a Dream, O'Neill

== Producer ==
- The Last (2002) (producer)
- A Dublin Story (2003) (executive producer)
- Martin (2003) (producer)
- Luka (2004) (producer)
- Push Hands (2004) (executive producer)
