= Alec Newman =

Scottish actor

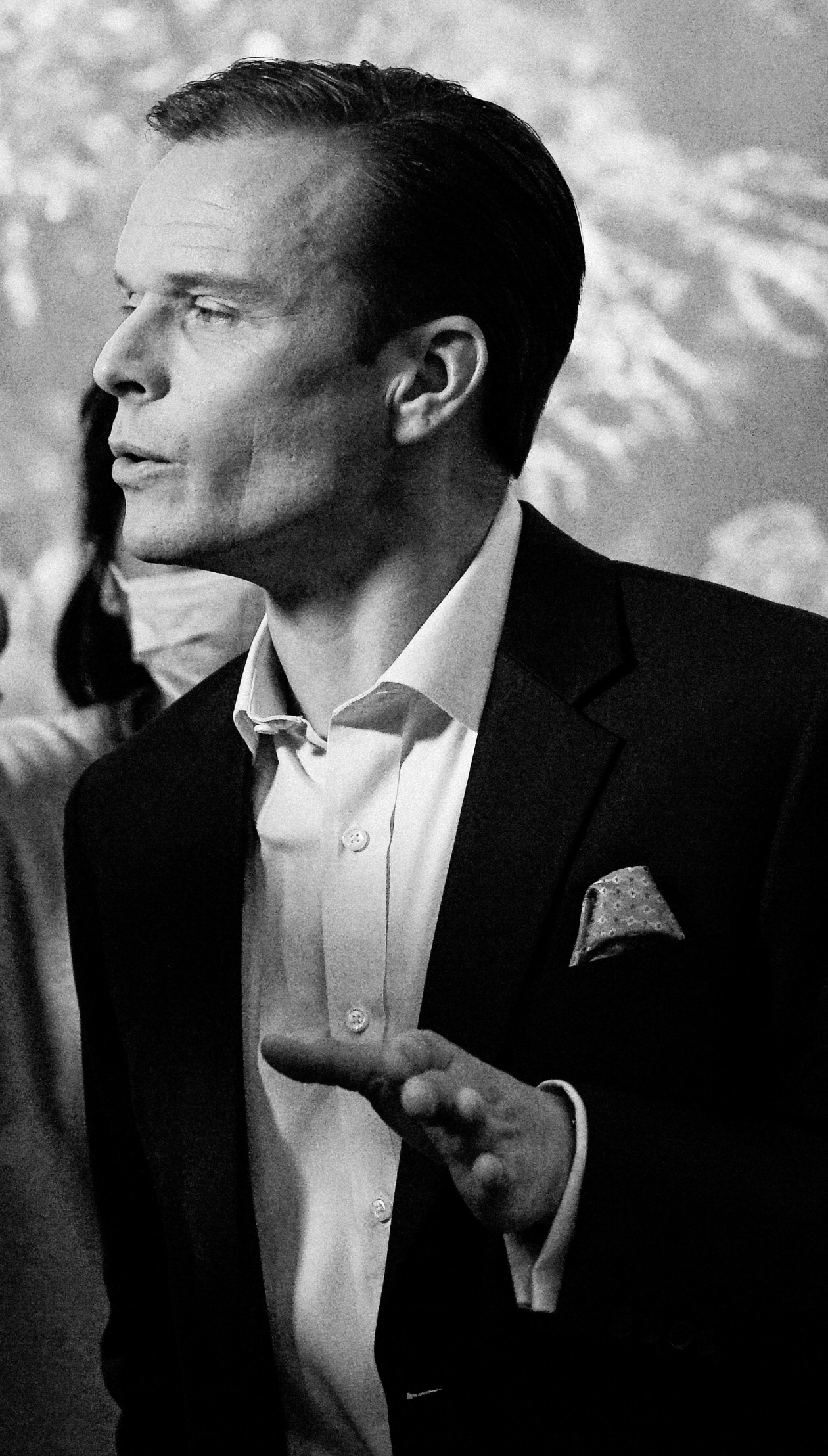
- Newman in 2017
- Born: Mark Alexander Newman; Glasgow, Scotland
- Education: London Academy of Music and Dramatic Art
- Occupation: Actor
- Years active: 1991–present

Alec Newman is a Scottish actor. He is best known for portraying Paul Atreides in the Sci Fi Channel's 2000 miniseries Frank Herbert's Dune and its 2003 sequel Frank Herbert's Children of Dune, based on Frank Herbert's Dune universe. He voiced Adam Smasher in Cyberpunk 2077 and Cyberpunk: Edgerunners and Cameron "Caz" McLeary in Still Wakes the Deep, for the latter of which he won the British Academy Games Award for Performer in a Leading Role.

== Early life ==
Newman was born in Glasgow, Scotland, and moved to Berkshire at the age of four. His father is Sandy Newman, a member of Scottish band Marmalade. He has a brother, John James Newman, who appeared on The Voice UK in 2012. Prior to joining the National Youth Theatre in London at age 17, Newman considered becoming a professional footballer. He trained at the London Academy of Music and Dramatic Art.

== Career ==
After graduating from LAMDA Newman built up a steady list of television and film credits before landing the lead role of Paul Atreides in the Sci Fi channel's miniseries Frank Herbert's Dune, reprising his role in Frank Herbert's Children of Dune. This led to a string of appearances in US TV and film, which culminated in being cast in the role of Barnabas Collins in a WB reboot of Dark Shadows. However, the show was not picked up for series.

The 2004 Hallmark Channel version of Frankenstein with Newman working with an ensemble cast including William Hurt and Donald Sutherland, met with favourable reviews and won an Emmy. This period also found Newman consistently working on film - in Penny Woolcock's The Principles of Lust and in the Stephen Fry directed Bright Young Things. Both played at festivals around the world including Cannes Film Festival, Sundance Film Festival and the BFI London Film Festival.

From 2011 to 2013 Newman played head teacher Michael Byrne in the BBC school drama Waterloo Road.

Series regular roles in Kurt Sutter's The Bastard Executioner, Amazon's Rogue, and HBO's Strike Back saw him in edgier and often action oriented territory, yet in Guy Pitt's 2014 film Greyhawk Newman's more intimate and emotional performance contributed to a nomination for the Michael Powell award at the Edinburgh International Film Festival. He has since worked with directors Tomas Alfredson, Amma Asante and George Clooney.

Newman has often played edgy and complex characters. Performances in the BBC's Showtrial and World Production's Karen Pirie are recent examples of roles with a moral conflict at their core.

He regularly returns to work in the theatre. The Donmar Warehouse production of King Lear, in which he played Edmund, transferred to the Brooklyn Academy of Music, New York. The National Theatre's 2015 production of The Motherfucker with the Hat featured Newman in the title role and was nominated at the Evening Standard Theatre Awards for Best Play. More recently, he played Bruno Bischofberger in the Young Vic production of Anthony McCarten's new play The Collaboration opposite Paul Bettany, Jeremy Pope and Sofia Barclay.

Newman also works as a voice artist appearing in numerous video games including Cyberpunk 2077, Assassin's Creed Valhalla, Assassin's Creed Syndicate and Lego Star Wars: The Skywalker Saga.

== Filmography ==
=== Film ===
| Year | Title | Role | Notes |
|---|---|---|---|
| 1999 | G:MT – Greenwich Mean Time | Charlie | |
| 2002 | Long Time Dead | Liam | |
| 2003 | Bright Young Things | Tiger | |
| 2003 | The Death of Klinghoffer | Young Benjamin | |
| 2003 | The Principles of Lust | Paul | |
| 2005 | Staring at the Sun | Clay Roberts | Short |
| 2005 | Constellation | Kent Seras | |
| 2005 | Four Corners of Suburbia | Benjamin Winters | |
| 2007 | The Fifth Patient | Dr. Stevenson | |
| 2007 | The Gene Generation | Christian | |
| 2008 | Blackwater | David | Short |
| 2009 | Moonlight Serenade | Nate Holden | |
| 2011 | A Lonely Place to Die | Rob | |
| 2011 | Disco | Mike | Short |
| 2014 | Greyhawk | Mal | |
| 2016 | The Head Hunter | John | |
| 2017 | The Snowman | Mould Man | |
| 2018 | The Marine 6: Close Quarters | Patrick Dillon | |
| 2018 | Where Hands Touch | Juttner | |
| 2018 | Suzanne & Martin | Martin | Short |
| 2018 | Mary Anning | Mr. Cromwell | |
| 2021 | All That Glitters | David | Short |
| 2021 | Code of Silence | Wright | |
| 2021 | The Visit | Patrick | Short |
| 2022 | Chevalier | Poncet | |
| 2023 | The Boys in the Boat | Harry Rantz | |
| 2024 | The Hunted | Vlad | |
| 2024 | Winnie-the-Pooh: Blood and Honey 2 | Alan Robin | |
| 2025 | Words of War | Major Popov | |
| 2026 | The Weight | Taggert | |

=== Television ===
| Year | Title | Role | Notes | Ref |
|---|---|---|---|---|
| 1996 | Lloyds Bank Channel 4 Film Challenge | John | Episode: "Cold Season" | |
| 1997 | Rag Nymph | Ben | TV miniseries | |
| 1997 | Taggart | Stephen Burns | Episode: "Apocalypse" (Part One) | |
| 1998 | Dangerfield | Michael Dyson | Episode: "The Last Picture" | |
| 1998 | Heartbeat | Johnny Wyler | Episode: "Local Knowledge" | |
| 1998 | Peak Practice | Sean Hollings | Episode: "A Matter of Principle" | |
| 1998 | Silent Witness | Nick Arnold | 2 episodes: "An Academic Exercise: Part 1" & "An Academic Exercise: Part 2" | |
| 1999 | The Blonde Bombshell | Jimmy Stanford | Episode: "1.1" | |
| 2000 | Frank Herbert's Dune | Paul Atreides / Muad'Dib | TV miniseries | |
| 2000 | Murder Rooms: Mysteries of the Real Sherlock Holmes | Thomas Neill | Episode: "The Dark Beginnings of Sherlock Holmes: Part 1"; Episode: "Dr. Bell and Mr. Doyle: Part 1 (U.S. Title)" | |
| 2001 | Judge John Deed | Heathcote Machin | Episode: "Rough Justice" | |
| 2002 | Judge John Deed | Heathcote Machin | Episode: "Nobody's Fool" | |
| 2002 | Night Flight | Young "Flash" Harry Peters | TV movie | |
| 2003 | Frank Herbert's Children of Dune | Paul Atreides / Muad'Dib | TV miniseries | |
| 2003 | Coming Up | Marc | Episode: "Loveless" | |
| 2004 | Tru Calling | Michael Mancuso | Episode: "The Longest Day" | |
| 2004 | Angel | Drogyn | 2 episodes: "A Hole In The World" and "Power Play" | |
| 2004 | Dark Shadows | Barnabas Collins | Unaired pilot | |
| 2004 | Frankenstein | Viktor Frankenstein | TV miniseries | |
| 2004 | Star Trek: Enterprise | Malik | 3 episodes: "Borderland", "Cold Station 12" & "The Augments" | |
| 2006 | Spooks | Richard Dempsey | Episode: "The Criminal" | |
| 2007 | Reichenbach Falls | Jim Buchan | TV movie | |
| 2008 | Casualty | Craig | Episode: "Hurt" | |
| 2008 | Heroes and Villains | Villafana | Episode: "Cortes" | |
| 2009 | Hope Springs | Euan Harries | TV series | |
| 2010 | Casualty | Robert Ludlow | Recurring role (9 episodes) | |
| 2010 | Silent Witness | John Carmody | Episode: "Run: Part 1" | |
| 2010 | Silent Witness | Peter Carmody | Episode: "Run: Part 2" | |
| 2010 | The Bill | Mark Pierce | Episode: "Paying the Price" | |
| 2011–2013 | Waterloo Road | Michael Byrne | Recurring role (47 episodes) | |
| 2013 | Dracula | Josef Cervenka | Episode: "From Darkness to Light" | |
| 2014 | 24 | Kevin Cordero | 2 Episodes: "Day 9: 2:00 p.m.-3:00 p.m" and "Day 9: 3:00 p.m.-4:00 p.m" | |
| 2014 | Lewis | Graham Lawrie | Episode: "Beyond Good and Evil" (2 parts) | |
| 2014 | Rogue | Ray Williams | Recurring role (10 episodes) | |
| 2015 | The Bastard Executioner | Leon Tell | Recurring role (9 episodes) | |
| 2015 | The Last Kingdom | King Aethelred | 2 episodes | |
| 2016 | Him | Ross Brodie | TV miniseries | |
| 2016 | Serial Thriller: Angel of Decay | John | Episode: "The Head Hunter Part 1" | |
| 2017 | Fearless | Tony Pullings | 5 episodes | |
| 2018 | Outlander | Joseph Wemyss | Episode: "Down the Rabbit Hole" | |
| 2018 | Eullenia | Marcus Hammond | 3 episodes | |
| 2019 | Strike Back | Pavel Kuragin | Recurring role (10 episodes) | |
| 2020 | Call the Midwife | Father Duncombe | Episode: "9.1" | |
| 2021 | Grace | Joe Baker | Episode: "Dead Tomorrow" | |
| 2021 | Unforgotten | Mark Tomlinson | 3 episodes | |
| 2021 | Love in the Lockdown | Giovanni | Recurring role (9 episodes) | |
| 2021 | Showtrial | Stephen Vendler | 2 Episodes: "Little Horses" and "Lady Tease" | |
| 2021 | Shetland | Niven Guthrie | 6 episodes | |
| 2022 | Karen Pirie | Ziggy Malkiewicz | Episode "1.1" | |
| 2022 | Cyberpunk: Edgerunners | Adam Smasher | Voice; episode: "My Moon My Man" | |
| 2023 | The Nurse | Nils Lundin | Voice; English version (4 episodes) | |
| 2023 | Sister Boniface Mysteries | Stanley Fawcett | Episode: "The Star of the Orient" | |
| 2024 | Protection | Edward Crowther | Recurring role | |

=== Video games ===
| Year | Title | Role | Notes | Ref |
|---|---|---|---|---|
| 2010 | Fable III | Additional voices | | |
| 2010 | GoldenEye 007 | Valentin Dmitrovich Zukovsky | | |
| 2010 | Xenoblade Chronicles | Vangarre | English version | |
| 2011 | The Adventures of Tintin: The Secret of the Unicorn | Sakharine | | |
| 2011 | Brink | Security | | |
| 2011 | Dragon Age II | Sebastian Vael - The Exiled Prince DLC, Seneschal Bran, Fenarel, Ser Theodore of Wildervale | | |
| 2011 | Killzone 3 | Helghast Soldiers | | |
| 2011 | Star Wars: The Old Republic | Apprentice Maraad, Captain Joris, Imperial Scientist, Imperial Soldier, Imperial Special Forces Soldier, Imperial Trooper, Lieutenant Mei, Lieutenant Orawn, NK-33, Private Cote, Private Ganbar, Private Wicke, Ri Farrona, Sapper, Sergeant, Sergeant Jaymis, Sergeant Pratt, Sith, Sith Apprentice, Soldier, Technician, Thanaton's Servant, The Old Man Imperial Form, Thul Scout, Thul Soldier, Transport Pilot, Warden Khel | | |
| 2011 | Warhammer 40,000: Space Marine | Orc Boyz | | |
| 2011 | The Witcher 2: Assassins of Kings | Arthur Tailles, additional voices | English version | |
| 2013 | Castlevania: Lords of Shadow – Mirror of Fate | Simon Belmont, Night Watchman | | |
| 2013 | Company of Heroes 2 | The Officer | In The British Forces DLC | |
| 2013 | Soul Sacrifice | Praeco | | |
| 2014 | Assassin's Creed Unity | Revolutionary Leader, Parisian Civilian | | |
| 2014 | Divinity: Original Sin | Additional voices | | |
| 2014 | Dragon Age: Inquisition | Finn, Gurd Harofsen, Hakkonite | In the Jaws of Hakkon DLC | |
| 2015 | Assassin's Creed: Syndicate | Jack | In the Jack the Ripper DLC | |
| 2015 | Assassin's Creed Unity | Additional voices | In the Dead Kings DLC | |
| 2015 | Dragon Age: Inquisition – Trespasser | Seneshal Bran | | |
| 2015 | Dragon Quest Heroes: The World Tree's Woe and the Blight Below | Kiryl | English version | |
| 2015 | Final Fantasy XIV: Heavensward | Lahabrea | | |
| 2015 | Soma | Automated Voice, Steve Glasser, additional voices | | |
| 2015 | The Witcher 3: Wild Hunt | Graden | English version | |
| 2016 | Battlefield 1 | Additional voices | | |
| 2016 | Dragon Quest Heroes II | Kiryl | English version | |
| 2016 | Hitman | Oybek Nabazov, Brendan Conner, Wen Ts'ai, Pavel Frydel, Keratoplasty Patient, Elusive Target Cast, Supporting Cast | | |
| 2016 | RIGS: Mechanized Combat League | Ferguson | | |
| 2016 | Steep | Nate Smith | | |
| 2016 | Total War: Warhammer | Additional voices | | |
| 2017 | Divinity: Original Sin II | Beast | | |
| 2017 | Get Even | Additional voices | | |
| 2017 | Nioh | The Others | | |
| 2017 | Star Wars: Battlefront II | Kram Namwen | | |
| 2017 | The Surge | Additional voices | | |
| 2017 | Warhammer 40,000: Dawn of War III | Gabriel Angelos | | |
| 2018 | Ni no Kuni II: Revenant Kingdom | Additional voices | | |
| 2018 | Vampyr | Benjamin, Mason, Richard, Booth | | |
| 2019 | A Plague Tale: Innocence | Robert, Soldier 2 | | |
| 2019 | The Surge 2 | Buccaneer, various voices | | |
| 2020 | Assassin's Creed Valhalla | Walla | | |
| 2020 | Cyberpunk 2077 | Anders Hellman, Adam Smasher, Arthur Jenkins, Reyes | | |
| 2021 | Gloomhaven | The Narrator | | |
| 2021 | Final Fantasy XIV: Endwalker | Hephaistos, Cagnazzo | | |
| 2022 | Dying Light 2 | Aitor | | |
| 2022 | The Diofield Chronicles | Donovar Sullion, Engram | | |
| 2024 | Still Wakes the Deep | Cameron "Caz" McLeary | Main character | |
| 2024 | Elden Ring | Dane | Shadow of the Erdtree DLC | |
| 2024 | Final Fantasy XIV: Dawntrail | Ketenramm, Geode, Frantic Man | | |
| 2026 | Crimson Desert | Kliff | Main character | |
