= Frank Herbert's Dune =

2000 three part TV mini-series directed by John Harrison

- DVD cover
- Based on: Dune by Frank Herbert
- Screenplay by: John Harrison
- Story by: Frank Herbert
- Directed by: John Harrison
- Starring: William Hurt; Alec Newman; Saskia Reeves; Ian McNeice; Julie Cox; Giancarlo Giannini
- Music by: Graeme Revell; Tim Simonec
- Countries of origin: United States; Canada; Germany; Italy
- Original language: English

Production
- Executive producers: Richard P. Rubinstein; Mitchell Galin
- Producer: David R. Kappes
- Production locations: Barrandov Studios, Prague, Czech Republic
- Cinematography: Vittorio Storaro
- Running time: 265 minutes 295 minutes (Director's cut)
- Production companies: New Amsterdam Entertainment; Blixa Film Produktion; Victor Television Productions
- Budget: $20 million

Original release
- Network: Syfy
- Release: December 3 – December 6, 2000

Related
- Frank Herbert's Children of Dune

Frank Herbert's Dune is a 2000 science fiction television miniseries, based on the 1965 novel of the same title by Frank Herbert. Written for the screen and directed by John Harrison, it stars Alec Newman as Paul Atreides, William Hurt as Duke Leto Atreides, and Saskia Reeves as Lady Jessica, along with Ian McNeice, Julie Cox, and Giancarlo Giannini. It was an international co-production between the American cable network Syfy (then-known as Sci Fi), and companies in Germany, Canada, and Italy. This is the second overall filmed adaptation of Herbert's novel, following the 1984 film directed by David Lynch, and preceding Denis Villeneuve's two-part film adaptation (2021 and 2024).

The series was first broadcast in three installments, beginning on December 3, 2000. It was released on DVD in 2001 by Artisan Entertainment, with an extended director's cut appearing in 2002. It received generally positive reviews, and was praised by both critics and audiences for its faithfulness to Herbert’s novel. The series was nominated for three Primetime Emmy Awards and won two, for Primetime Emmy Award for Outstanding Cinematography for a Limited Series or Movie and Primetime Emmy Award for Outstanding Special Visual Effects.

A 2003 sequel miniseries titled Frank Herbert's Children of Dune continues the story, adapting the second and third novels in the series (1969's Dune Messiah and its 1976 sequel Children of Dune). Both miniseries are among the highest-rated programs ever to be broadcast on Syfy.

== Cast ==
- William Hurt as Duke Leto Atreides
- Alec Newman as Paul Atreides / Muad'Dib
- Saskia Reeves as Lady Jessica
- James Watson as Duncan Idaho
- Jan Vlasák as Thufir Hawat
- P. H. Moriarty as Gurney Halleck
- Robert Russell as Dr. Wellington Yueh
- Laura Burton as Alia Atreides
- Ian McNeice as Baron Vladimir Harkonnen
- Matt Keeslar as Feyd-Rautha
- László I. Kish as Glossu Rabban
- Jan Unger as Piter De Vries
- Giancarlo Giannini as Padishah Emperor Shaddam IV
- Julie Cox as Princess Irulan
- Miroslav Táborský as Count Hasimir Fenring
- Uwe Ochsenknecht as Stilgar
- Barbora Kodetová as Chani
- Jakob Schwarz as Otheym
- Karel Dobrý as Liet-Kynes
- Christopher Lee Brown as Jamis
- Jaroslava Šiktancová as Shadout Mapes
- Zuzana Geislerová as Reverend Mother Gaius Helen Mohiam
- Philip Lenkowsky as Guild Agent

== Production ==
=== Development ===
Acquiring the television rights to Frank Herbert's original six Dune novels, executive producer Richard P. Rubinstein envisioned the complex material adapted in a miniseries format, as he had done previously with Stephen King's The Stand and The Langoliers. He told The New York Times in 2003, "I have found there's a wonderful marriage to be had between long, complicated books and the television miniseries. There are some books that just can't be squeezed into a two-hour movie." Around the same time Rubenstein was first developing the material, the Sci Fi Channel's president, Bonnie Hammer, was spearheading a campaign for the channel to produce "blockbuster miniseries on a regular basis". The Dune miniseries was greenlit in November 1999.

Released in 2000, Frank Herbert's Dune was the first of the Sci Fi Channel's miniseries, followed by Steven Spielberg's miniseries Taken in 2002, and Frank Herbert's Children of Dune and Battlestar Galactica in 2003. Rubenstein called his two Dune miniseries "science fiction for people who don't ordinarily like science fiction" and suggested that "the Dune saga tends to appeal to women in part because it features powerful female characters".

=== Filming ===
Though the production initially scouted filming locations in Morocco, these proved unfeasible. Dune was shot entirely in the Czech Republic at Barrandov Studios in Prague, with post-production taking place at Cinecittà Studios in Rome, Italy. The miniseries was shot by Oscar-winning cinematographer Vittorio Storaro in his proprietary Univisium (2.00:1) aspect ratio, although it was broadcast in 1.78:1. The sets were designed by production designer Miljen Kljaković, and the costumes by Theodor Pištěk.

=== Comparisons to source material ===
Director John Harrison has described his adaptation as a "faithful interpretation" in which any changes he made served to suggest what Herbert had explained subtly or not at all. The miniseries introduces elements not found in Herbert's novel, but according to the director, these serve to elaborate rather than to edit. Hurt was the first to be cast in the 2000 adaptation. A fan of the novel, he told The New York Times, "I was a science fiction junkie ... [Harrison] captured Herbert's prophetic reflection of our own age, where nation-states are competing with the new global economy and its corporate elements."

Herbert's novel begins with lead character Paul Atreides being 15 years old and aging to 18 over the course of the story. Harrison aged the character to adulthood in order to draw upon an adult acting pool for this crucial role.

The miniseries invents an extensive subplot for Princess Irulan, a character who plays little part in the plot of the first novel. Harrison felt the need to expand Irulan's role because she played such an important part in later books, and epigraphs from her later writings opened each chapter of Dune. Additionally, the character gave him a window into House Corrino. Besides the final scene, the only one of Irulan's appearances based on an actual excerpt from the novel is her visit to Feyd-Rautha. However, in the book it is a different Bene Gesserit, Margot Fenring, who visits the Harkonnen heir, on assignment from the Bene Gesserit to "preserve the bloodline" by retrieving his genetic material (through conception) for their breeding program. The miniseries does not suggest this as Irulan's motive.

== Broadcast ==
The first episode was broadcast on Sci Fi in the United States on December 3, 2000; the second episode was broadcast on December 4 and the third and last on December 6.

== Soundtrack ==
A soundtrack album for the miniseries was released by GNP Crescendo Records on December 3, 2000. It contains 27 tracks composed by Graeme Revell and Tim Simonec and performed by the City of Prague Philharmonic Orchestra.

== Reception ==
=== Ratings ===
Frank Herbert's Dune aired in three parts, starting Sunday, December 3, 2000. The first installment achieved a 4.6 rating with 3 million homes, and the miniseries averaged a 4.4/2.9 million households over all three nights. This doubled all viewership records for Sci Fi, placing Dune among the top ten of basic cable's original miniseries in the five years previous. Two of the three installments also rated among the year's top 10 original cable movies. As of 2007, the 2000 Dune miniseries and its 2003 sequel were two of the three highest-rated programs ever to be broadcast on the Sci Fi Channel.

=== Critical response ===
Emmet Asher-Perrin of Tor.com deemed the miniseries a better adaptation than the 1984 Lynch film, but wrote that "it doesn't reach spectacular heights due to the desire to be as close to the written text as possible." She wrote that "the story naturally drags at certain points in the book that work in prose but not on screen", and added that "the narrative gets over-explained in an effort to be sure that no one watching is left behind." Asher-Perrin suggested that Harrison's choice to cast adult actor Newman as Paul is problematic because the character is written in the script as less mature and observant than he is in the source novel, but she praised many members of the cast, in particular McNeice (Baron Harkonnen) and Cox (Irulan). Asher-Perrin also complimented the special effects, set design, and costuming.

The series was also praised by several critics, including Kim Newman.

=== Awards and nominations ===
Award	Year	Category	Nominee(s)	Result
American Society of Cinematographers Award	2001	Outstanding Achievement in Cinematography in Motion Picture, Limited Series, or Pilot Made for Television	Vittorio Storaro	Nominated
Cinema Audio Society Award	2001	Outstanding Achievement in Sound Mixing for Television Movie or Limited Series	Larry Stensvold, Pete Elia, Michal Holubec	Nominated
Hugo Award	2001	Best Dramatic Presentation	John Harrison, Frank Herbert	Nominated
Motion Picture Sound Editors Award	2001	Best Sound Editing - Television Mini-Series - Effects & Foley	Jay Wilkinson, Erik Aadahl, Andrew Ellerd, Bruce Tanis, Victor Iorillo	Won
Motion Picture Sound Editors Award	2001	Best Sound Editing - Television Mini-Series - Dialogue & ADR	Jay Wilkinson, Erik Aadahl, Bruce Tanis, Victor Iorillo, Andrew Ellerd, Bob Newlan, Ulrika Akander, David Grecu, Sonya Lindsay, David Beadle, Jeff Rosen, Larry Goeb, R.J. Palmer, Helen Luttrell, Patrick Hogan, Joshua Winget, Dale W. Perry	Nominated
Primetime Emmy Award	2001	Outstanding Cinematography for a Miniseries or Movie	Vittorio Storaro (for "Part 2")	Won
Primetime Emmy Award	2001	Outstanding Sound Editing for a Miniseries, Movie or a Special	Jay Wilkinson, Erik Aadahl, Bruce Tanis, Victor Iorillo, Andrew Ellerd, Bob Newlan, Ulrika Akander, David Grecu, Sonya Lindsay, David Beadle, Jeff Rosen, Larry Goeb, R.J. Palmer, Helen Luttrell, Patrick Hogan, Joshua Winget, Dale W. Perry (for "Part 3")<	Nominated
Primetime Emmy Award	2001	Outstanding Special Visual Effects for a Miniseries, Movie or a Special	Ernest Farino, Tim McHugh, Laurel Klick, Frank H. Isaacs, Elaine Essex Thompson, Jim Healy, Greg Nicotero, Tony Alderson, Chris Zapara (for "Part 1")	Won

== Alternate versions ==
A director's cut special edition was released on DVD featuring expanded footage and dialogue.

== Video game ==
The 2001 3D video game Frank Herbert's Dune by Cryo Interactive/DreamCatcher Interactive is styled after the 2000 miniseries.

== Sequel series ==
A 2003 sequel miniseries titled Frank Herbert's Children of Dune continues the story, adapting the second and third novels in the series (1969's Dune Messiah and its 1976 sequel Children of Dune).

== Relation to other adaptations ==
John Harrison and Richard P. Rubinstein are credited as executive producers of the Dune (2021) and Dune: Part Two (2024), the two-part theatrical film adaptation of the novel released by Warner Bros.
