= Lady Jessica =

Character in the Dune franchise created by Frank Herbert

- Dune character
- Rebecca Ferguson as Lady Jessica in Dune (2021)
- First appearance: Dune (1963–65)
- Last appearance: The Heir of Caladan (2022)
- Created by: Frank Herbert
- Portrayed by: Francesca Annis (1984 film); Saskia Reeves (2000 series); Alice Krige (2003 series); Rebecca Ferguson (2021 / 2024 films)

In-universe information
- Occupation: Reverend Mother
- Affiliation: Bene Gesserit; House Atreides
- Significant others: Leto I Atreides; Gurney Halleck (Note: Jessica's later involvement with Gurney Halleck is inferred in Children of Dune as Alia notes, "Gurney Halleck would be with [Jessica] ... Some said he'd become her mother's lover.")
- Children: Paul Atreides; Alia Atreides
- Relatives: Vladimir Harkonnen (father); Tanidia Nerus (mother); Zora (half-sister); Brom (nephew); Leto II Atreides (grandson); Ghanima Atreides (granddaughter); Prequels: Gaius Helen Mohiam (Note: The Prelude to Dune prequel trilogy by Brian Herbert and Kevin J. Anderson establishes that Tanidia Nerus is an alias of Gaius Helen Mohiam.)

Lady Jessica is a fictional character in the Dune universe created by Frank Herbert. A main character in the 1963–65 novel Dune, Jessica also plays an important role in the later installment Children of Dune (1976). The events surrounding Jessica's conception, her birth and her early years with Leto are chronicled in the prequel trilogies Prelude to Dune (1999–2001) and Caladan (2020–2022) by Brian Herbert and Kevin J. Anderson. The character is brought back as a ghola in the Herbert/Anderson sequels which conclude the original series, Hunters of Dune (2006) and Sandworms of Dune (2007).

Lady Jessica was portrayed by Francesca Annis in the 1984 David Lynch film Dune. Saskia Reeves played the role in the 2000 Sci-Fi Channel TV miniseries Frank Herbert's Dune, which was subsequently portrayed by Alice Krige in the 2003 sequel, Frank Herbert's Children of Dune. Rebecca Ferguson portrayed Jessica in the 2021 Denis Villeneuve film adaptation and its 2024 sequel.

== Description ==
Jessica is described in Dune as having "hair like shaded bronze ... and green eyes" as well as an "oval face." This shape is later notable as a marker of Jessica's bloodline. Novelist Brian Herbert, Frank Herbert's son and biographer, wrote that "Frank Herbert had modeled Lady Jessica Atreides after [his wife] Beverly Herbert, with her dignified, gentle ways of influence, and even her prescient abilities, which my mother actually possessed."

Francesca Annis, who portrayed Jessica in the 1984 film Dune, said of the character, "I see her as sort of a supreme matriarch ... She's a mother, a guardian, a guide and an almost mystical figure". Michel Chion wrote, "In the novel, [Jessica] is a pitiless, resolute woman with an influential voice. She is also the book's second most important character, present in a great many scenes narrated from her point of view. She does not hesitate to reprimand, advise and toughen her son."

== The original series ==
=== Dune ===
As Dune begins, Jessica is the Bene Gesserit concubine to the Duke Leto Atreides, and mother to his young son and heir Paul. Leto has been granted control of the lucrative planetary fief of Arrakis, and is moving his entire household there from his ocean homeworld of Caladan. Though Jessica's mentor and former instructor, the Bene Gesserit Reverend Mother Gaius Helen Mohiam, remains furious over Jessica's past insubordination—she had been instructed to bear only daughters but, out of love for Leto, she instead intentionally conceived Paul—Mohiam is somewhat intrigued by the potential she sees in the 15-year-old boy. Still, an Atreides daughter is a crucial part of the Bene Gesserit breeding program to eventually produce a super-being they call the Kwisatz Haderach.

Previously managed by House Atreides' longtime enemies, the Harkonnens, Arrakis is an inhospitable desert planet plagued by giant sandworms, and the only known source of melange, the valuable drug at the center of the galactic empire's economy. Leto suspects treachery on the part of Padishah Emperor Shaddam IV, but cannot refuse the assignment. Soon the Baron Harkonnen launches an attack, his forces secretly bolstered by Shaddam's fierce Sardaukar warriors and aided by Leto's own trusted Suk doctor, Wellington Yueh. Coerced by the Baron to save his wife from torture, Yueh disables the shields of the Atreides fortress and delivers a drugged Leto to the Baron, but also provides Leto with a false tooth filled with poison gas. Leto bites down on the tooth in the Baron's presence, but the gas only manages to kill Leto and the Baron's twisted Mentat, Piter De Vries. Jessica is drugged, bound and gagged to prevent her using her powers. The Baron orders that she and Paul be disposed of in the desert. Thanks to supplies left by Yueh, Paul and Lady Jessica escape into the desert and find refuge with the native Fremen. They take advantage of the legends planted there by the Bene Gesserit's Missionaria Protectiva, which practices religious engineering. Jessica casts Paul as the Lisan al'Gaib, the messiah, and herself as the Reverend Mother who shall bring him, even though she has not yet experienced the Bene Gesserit spice agony that transforms an acolyte into a full Reverend Mother. Jessica is also revealed to be the secret daughter of the Baron Harkonnen himself.

Paul soon molds the Fremen into a massive army with which he hopes to retake the planet from Imperial rule. The Fremen have their own "wild" Reverend Mothers, women who undergo their own version of the spice agony to awaken their Other Memory. Jessica undergoes the ritual of spice agony and replaces the dying Fremen Reverend Mother. But Jessica is pregnant during the ordeal, exposing the fetus to the same awakening of ancestral ego-memories. A child born this way is called an Abomination by the Bene Gesserit, because experiencing this heightened awareness before they have formed a personality of their own makes them vulnerable to eventually being overtaken by one of their ancestral personalities. Jessica's daughter Alia, a full Reverend Mother from birth, is a grown woman in a child's body. Paul's Fremen seize control of Arrakis from Shaddam and the Harkonnens, and Paul accedes to the throne as Emperor after taking the Emperor's daughter as his wife.

Paul is the Kwisatz Haderach, and eventually sets the Imperium on a course lasting thousands of years in the person of his son, Leto II. Much to the frustration of the Bene Gesserit, they do not control Paul, and the events of the coming millennia leave Jessica noteworthy as a figure of history who committed a great wrong (according to the Bene Gesserit); in the coming centuries, for a Bene Gesserit to choose her love over the instructions of her order is known as "the Jessica crime."

=== Sequels ===
By the time of Dune Messiah (1969), Jessica has returned to Caladan, the ancestral home of the Atreides. She has also, by some accounts, returned to the Sisterhood following the death of her Duke, and while she cannot influence Paul, she does act as distant counselor. It is also implied that she and Atreides Weapons Master Gurney Halleck have become lovers.

In Children of Dune (1976), Jessica returns to Dune to inspect Paul's children, Leto II and Ghanima, to see if they can be returned to the control of the Sisterhood. Leto notes the identity of Jessica's birth mother: Tanidia Nerus. Realizing that Alia is fully possessed, Jessica survives an assassination attempt by Alia and flees to the desert once more, taking refuge with Fremen leader (and old friend) Stilgar in Sietch Tabr. A civil war has divided Arrakis, with Fremen revolting against the transformation of the desert started by Pardot Kynes. Alia's husband, Duncan Idaho, also realizes that Alia is possessed. When Alia instructs Duncan to make her mother disappear, Duncan kidnaps her on the orders of the Preacher, a mysterious desert figure that some suspect is Paul Atreides, who disappeared into the desert. Duncan takes her to Salusa Secundus, the home of exiled House Corrino and the previous Emperor Shaddam IV. The Preacher has told Jessica, through Duncan, to train the pupil she finds there: Prince Farad'n, Shaddam's grandson. She trains him in the Bene Gesserit way, and at the end of Children of Dune, he becomes Ghanima's concubinus and Leto's Royal Scribe.

Jessica is quoted via epigraph in Heretics of Dune (1984):

When strangers meet, great allowance should be made for differences of custom and training. — The Lady Jessica, from Wisdom of Arrakis (Note: Jessica makes this statement to a Spacing Guild banker in the banquet scene in Dune.)

In Chapterhouse: Dune (1986) it is noted that she "lived out her years on Caladan." According to the Appendix IV: The Almanak en-Ashraf (Selected Excerpts of the Noble Houses) in Dune, Lady Jessica dies in the year 10,256 A.G. after 102 years of life.

== Prequels ==
In the Prelude to Dune prequel trilogy (1999–2001) by Brian Herbert and Kevin J. Anderson, it is revealed that Mohiam is Jessica's biological mother. According to the authors, this fact was pulled directly from Frank Herbert's working notes for the original Dune series. In the storyline, Mohiam blackmails the homosexual Baron Harkonnen into a sexual encounter. When the first daughter she conceives proves genetically undesirable, she is forced to return. At this point the Baron drugs and viciously rapes Mohiam, and in retribution she secretly infects him with the disease that will later leave him horribly obese. The daughter born of this second union is Jessica. The Prelude to Dune series also follows Jessica and Leto's relationship from their first meeting through the birth (and subsequent kidnapping and return) of their son Paul. It is indicated that Jessica's choice to bear a son is partially due to her desire to help Leto overcome the devastating loss of his first son, Victor, by his concubine Kailea Vernius.

The Caladan trilogy (2020–2022) by Brian Herbert and Anderson continues the story of Leto and Jessica's relationship and Paul's early years before the events of Dune.

== In adaptations ==
=== 1984 film ===
Francesca Annis as Lady Jessica in Dune, wearing a costume by Bob Ringwood and makeup and hair by Giannetto De Rossi and Mirella De Rossi

Lady Jessica was portrayed by Francesca Annis in the 1984 David Lynch film Dune. Annis said that when her agent first called her to say that Lynch and producer Dino De Laurentiis were interested in her for a part in Dune, she declined a meeting because she was working on a television series in northern England and had heard that a "big film star" was already in line for the role. Annis had been recommended to Lynch because of her portrayal of Lillie Langtry in the 1978 series Lillie, for which she had won the BAFTA Television Award for Best Actress. Lynch and De Laurentiis persisted, insisting on a meeting and took the Concorde to London. Annis said, "I got the last train to London from Manchester after filming and I met David for an hour at 10 p.m. before getting the all-night train back to Manchester." During filming in Mexico, Annis burned off her eyebrows, eyelashes and the front of her hair in an oven explosion, which makeup artist Giannetto De Rossi fixed for filming. She said that the Reverend Mothers being bald in the film was an unrelated creative decision by Lynch.

Richard Corliss of Time praised "the lustrous Francesca Annis ... who whispers her lines with the urgency of erotic revelation. In those moments when Annis is onscreen, Dune finds the emotional center that has eluded it in its parade of rococo decor and austere special effects. She reminds us of what movies can achieve when they have a heart as well as a mind." Michel Chion described the depiction of Jessica in the film as a "radical reversal" from the novel, writing that "Jessica becomes a gentle woman, a solicitous mother and wife, and finally a docile and discreet companion in flight." Praising the work of costume designer Bob Ringwood, Ed Naha wrote, "In terms of sheer artistry, Lady Jessica's costumes deserve much applause. She wears a variety of shimmering gowns that are never anything less than ornate."

=== 2000 miniseries ===
Saskia Reeves played the role in the 2000 Sci-Fi Channel TV miniseries Frank Herbert's Dune. In her review of the 2000 miniseries, Emmet Asher-Perrin of Tor.com wrote that Reeves "embodies everything that you would expect from Lady Jessica in both bearing and commanding presence."

=== 2003 miniseries ===
Reeves's real-life pregnancy forced producers to recast the role with Alice Krige for the 2003 sequel miniseries, Frank Herbert's Children of Dune. Laura Fries of Variety noted, "it's Susan Sarandon [as Farad'n's mother Wensicia] and Alice Krige who steal the thunder as opposing matriarchs of the great royal houses. Although the two never catfight, their ongoing struggle to rule the Dune dynasty gives this mini a real kick." Observing that Sarandon and Krige were "clearly relishing their roles", Fries added that "Sarandon makes a formidable enemy, while Krige, traditionally cast as the villain, proves she can work both sides of the moral fence." Asher-Perrin noted of the recast, "While it's hard not to miss Reeves's elegance, there is an otherworldliness to Krige that suits a Bene Gesserit 'witch' superbly."

=== 2021 and 2024 films ===
Rebecca Ferguson as Jessica in Dune: Part Two (2024), depicted with ritual Fremen garments, facial tattoos and the blue-in-blue eyes of a melange addict

Rebecca Ferguson portrayed Jessica in the 2021 Denis Villeneuve film Dune and its 2024 sequel, Dune: Part Two. The films adapt the 1965 novel in two parts. Ferguson was initially dismissive of the role, as she felt it was too similar to Ilsa Faust, the character she played in the Mission: Impossible franchise, and she did not want to be typecast as a "strong female character". However, she was convinced after hearing Villeneuve's ideas and reading the book, saying she enjoyed the "simplicity of wanting to save something you have created and all of these shades".

Villeneuve was intent on increasing the prominence of the female characters and themes from the book. He said, "Femininity is there in the book, but I thought it should be up front. I said, 'We need to make sure that Lady Jessica is not an expensive extra.' She's such a beautiful and complex character." Ferguson said that while Villeneuve respected Herbert's characterization in the book, Villeneuve's modifications had helped improve the quality of female characters by expanding the role of Lady Jessica as a soldier and member of the Bene Gesserit. As such, the studio labeled this role a "warrior priestess", in contrast to the joking label of "space nun" that Villeneuve felt was implied by the book. Ferguson said of Jessica, "She's a mother, she's a concubine, she's a soldier." The Los Angeles Times wrote that Ferguson's Jessica "has a fierceness and a fighting prowess, along with her Bene Gesserit mental abilities, not always evident in the novel." IGN explained that in the first film, Jessica is simultaneously driven by a need to protect the son she loves and "a desire to facilitate his rise to power", describing her as "a cunning manipulator who has been training Paul in the superhuman abilities of her order against their wishes, and grooming him for a dark destiny that the young Atreides spends much of the two films hoping to avoid."

Discussing the second film, Villeneuve said, "Lady Jessica kind of disappears in the second part of the book, and I made sure as I was writing the screenplay to do the opposite, to make sure that she will be active, to bring her back to the front of the story." Ferguson said of Jessica in Part Two, "She's a mom protecting and training someone, something. I say something because she knows [she's dealing with] an entity bigger than themselves. When Paul starts going off, she begins losing power, and it puts her on an unpredicted journey to discover who we are in response to other people." Villeneuve explained, "She lost everything. She is a survivor like her son Paul, and she has to strategize how to accomplish her ambition. It's a really beautiful and nicely complex character." Jessica becomes fixated with fulfilling the Fremen prophecy and installing Paul as their messiah. IGN wrote that Jessica steps "into an even more overtly villainous role" in the second film, with "her relationship with Paul becoming more antagonistic as she sets in motion the events that will lead to his accepting the role of [messiah] and challenging the Emperor".

While Jessica is depicted in "ornate and ceremonial" costumes as the concubine of Duke Leto in the first film, she wears ritual garments and her face is covered in tattoos in the aftermath of her transformation into the Fremen Reverend Mother in Part Two. Villeneuve explained, "She's trying to play on the symbolism that was put in the prophecy. She's supposed to be the mother of the messiah, so I wanted to bring the idea that she was like the Pope of the Reverend Mothers on Arrakis. There's some kind of madness in writing elements of the prophecies on her face. Frankly, I think when you drink the worm poison, it affects your sanity—and the same with Paul. I like the idea that we feel she's going too far." The Guardian wrote that Jessica is "twisted" by the Fremen ritual and "takes on a chilling ruthlessness". Villeneuve said, "We see that there's a darkness, a very specific darkness in her eyes. Lady Jessica is one of the masterminds of Dune. She's trying to play her own agenda." The Washington Post wrote that Jessica "goes off the deep end" in pursuing her ambitions for Paul.

The Telegraph praised a "tremendous, melodramatically on-target" Ferguson in the first film, describing her chemistry with costar Timothée Chalamet, who portrays Paul, as "devotional, bordering on incestuous". Empire praised her "wrenching performance" as Jessica waits for Paul to complete Mohiam's test. IGN wrote of Part Two, "That Jessica has any sympathy from the audience—despite being a eugenicist and megalomaniac who usurped the religious leadership of an indigenous culture so her son could claim dominion of the universe almost purely out of her own vanity—all comes down to Ferguson imbuing her with inner life and dimension that makes us feel like we understand her even when the script doesn't actually give us every detail about her motivations." Villeneuve said, "I'm looking forward for the world to see what Rebecca has accomplished. She's not afraid to go very far away. She's a force that I can count on."

== Merchandising ==
A line of Dune action figures from toy company LJN was released to lackluster sales in 1984. Styled after David Lynch's film, the collection featured figures of various characters. A figure of Lady Jessica previewed in LJN's catalog was never produced. In 2020, Funko produced a Lady Jessica figure as part of their POP! Television line. It is a 4.5-inch (11 cm) vinyl figure in the Japanese chibi style, depicting Jessica in a glow-in-the-dark yellow outfit styled after the 2021 Villeneuve film. McFarlane Toys released a Lady Jessica 7-inch figurine in November 2020 and Dark Horse released a Lady Jessica 8.9-inch (22.61 cm) figurine in March 2022, both featuring the character in a stillsuit. In February 2024, a Lego Dune playset based on the Atreides ornithopter from the 2021 Dune film was released, containing a Lady Jessica Lego minifigure.

== Family tree ==
House Atreides family tree

House Atreides
House Harkonnen
House Corrino	Baron Vladimir; Harkonnen	Tanidia Nerus (Note: The Prelude to Dune prequel series (1999–2001) establishes that Tanidia Nerus is an alias of Gaius Helen Mohiam.)
Anirul	Shaddam IV	Leto I Atreides	Lady Jessica (Note: In Dune (1965), Jessica is the concubine of Leto I, and Chani becomes the concubine of their son, Paul.)
Count Dalak; Kenola	Princess Wensicia	Princess Irulan	Paul Atreides	Chani
Josifa	Farad'n	Ghanima Atreides	Leto II Atreides	Leto II Atreides; The Elder (Note: The infant Leto II Atreides is murdered in Dune, and his brother Leto II is later also named after their grandfather, Leto I, in Children of Dune (1976).)	Duncan Idaho
Chalice	Rugi	Many generations (Note: Per God Emperor of Dune, Duncan Idaho gholas was used several times in Leto II's breeding program)	Alia Atreides	Hayt (Note: Hayt is a ghola of Duncan Idaho, a kind of clone made using his corpse.)
Moneo Atreides
Siona Atreides
Many generations
Miles Teg
Darwi Odrade
