= Nanotechnology in fiction =

Fictional uses of nanotechnology

The use of nanotechnology in fiction has attracted scholarly attention. The first use of the distinguishing concepts of nanotechnology was "There's Plenty of Room at the Bottom", a talk given by physicist Richard Feynman in 1959. K. Eric Drexler's 1986 book Engines of Creation introduced the general public to the concept of nanotechnology. Since then, nanotechnology has been used frequently in a diverse range of fiction, often as a justification for unusual or far-fetched occurrences featured in speculative fiction.

== Notable examples ==
=== Literature ===
In 1931, Boris Zhitkov wrote a short story titled Microhands (Микроруки), where the narrator builds a pair of microscopic remote manipulators and uses them for fine tasks like eye surgery. When he attempts to build even smaller manipulators operated by the first pair, the story goes into detail about the problem of regular materials behaving differently on a microscopic scale.

In his 1956 short story The Next Tenants, Arthur C. Clarke describes tiny machines that operate at the micrometer scale – although not strictly nanoscale ("billionth of a meter"), they are perhaps the first fictional example of the concepts now associated with nanotechnology.

A concept similar to nanotechnology, called "micromechanical devices", was described in Stanislaw Lem's 1959 novel Eden. These devices were used by the aliens as "seeds" to grow a wall around the human spaceship. Lem's 1964 novel The Invincible involves the discovery of an artificial ecosystem of minuscule robots, although like in Clarke's story they are larger than what is strictly meant by the term 'nanotechnology'.

Robert Silverberg's 1969 short story How It Was when the Past Went Away describes nanotechnology being used in the construction of stereo loudspeakers, with a thousand speakers per inch.

The 1984 novel Peace on Earth by Stanislaw Lem is about small bacteria-sized nanorobots that resemble normal dust. Originally developed by artificial intelligence placed by humans on the Moon in the era of cold warfare, the nanobots later come to Earth and begin replicating, destroying all weapons, modern technology and software, while leaving living beings intact.

The 1985 novel Blood Music by Greg Bear (originally a 1983 short story) features genetically engineered white blood cells that eventually learn to manipulate matter on an atomic scale.

The 1991 novelization of Terminator 2: Judgment Day, authored by Randall Frakes, expands the origin story of the T-1000 Terminator through the inclusion of a prologue set in the future. It is explained that the T-1000 is a 'Nanomorph', created by Skynet, through the use of programmable nanotechnology. This was only implied in the film itself.

The 1992 novel Assemblers of Infinity is a science-fiction novel authored by Kevin J. Anderson and Doug Beason. The plot line makes specific mention of nano-assembly and nano-disassembly robots, along with admonitions regarding the dangers that these bacteria-sized machines might pose.

In Kim Stanley Robinson's Red Mars (1992), the extraordinary tensile strength of carbon nanotubes is used to create a tether for a space elevator, which connects Mars to an asteroid that has been led into orbit around the planet. The space elevator speeds travel of people and materials between Earth and Mars, but also creates tension between factions — and is later destroyed.

Neal Stephenson's 1995 novel The Diamond Age is set in a world where nanotechnology is commonplace. Nanoscale warfare, fabrication at the molecular scale, and self-assembling islands all exist.

The morphing technology in Animorphs is a form of nanotechnology that allows its users to transform into other animal and alien species, as well as members of their own species.

The Trinity Blood series published 2001-2004 features an alien nanomachine found on Mars that is present in the body of the protagonist, Abel Nightroad. These nanomachines are known as Krusnik nanomachines, and feed on the cells of vampires.

Nanobots (called Nanoes) are central to Stel Pavlou's novel Decipher (2001).

Michael Crichton's novel Prey (2002) is a cautionary tale about the possible risks of developing nanotechnology. In Prey, a swarm of molecule-sized nanorobots develops intelligence and becomes a large scale threat.

The 2003 Dean Koontz novel By the Light of the Moon features characters injected with nanotechnology against their will by an unscrupulous research scientist.

Robert Ludlum's 2005 novel The Lazarus Vendetta focuses on nanotechnology, particularly its ability to cure cancer.

The 2006 children's novel The Doomsday Dust (book 4 in the Spy Gear Adventures series by Rick Barba) features a nanite swarm as the villain.

1995's GURPS Robots by science fiction writer David Pulver features the nanomorph, which is a fictional robot made of nanomachines. Its brain is distributed throughout its whole body, which also acts as an all-around sensor, making it impossible to surprise as long as the target is in line of sight. The nanomorph is capable of using parts of its body as a tracking to perform several tasks, merging with other nanomorphs, gliding by transforming itself into a giant kite, and changing its color and texture for camouflage.

In the Expanse series, the protomolecule was created by a race of ancient aliens and sent to star systems across the galaxy to terraform planets into habitable worlds and develop a gateway network to facilitate interstellar travel. The protomolecule could consume biomass and technology and use them to serve various functions. Numerous violent conflicts occurred between factions of humanity, notably the United Nations, Martian Congressional Republic, Outer Planets Alliance, and Laconian Empire, for control of this technology.

Rudy Rucker's 2007 novel Postsingular depicts the protagonists' experiences with three generations of swarm nanorobots: "nants", initially tasked with consuming the Earth and Moon (including organic life) to create a virtual Earth before being reversed; "orphids", tasked with a more ubiquitous and assistive role in augmenting reality, interfacing with human thought, and even enabling interdimensional travel; and "silps", which accomplish the Singularity by replacing the previous generations of nanorobots and enable organic beings and inorganic material on Earth to express sentient, intelligible thought to each other. Rucker's 2009 sequel Hylozoic continues the protagonists' experiences with silps after the Singularity as they enable interstellar and interdimensional travel and communication with Earth by extraterrestrial beings who have already experienced similar Singularities themselves.

=== Film and television ===
One of the first mentions on a television show was an announcement to students over the school loudspeakers in the 1987 Max Headroom episode, "Academy" that, "Nanotechnology pod test results are posted in the Submicron Lab for your viewing."

The anime series Ghost in the Shell: Stand Alone Complex employs a plotline heavily involved in the use of "micromachines" as a form of treatment against complex diseases after a subject undergoing cyberisation.

In the Star Trek universe, from Star Trek: The Next Generation onward, the Borg use nanomachines, referred to as nanoprobes, to assimilate individuals into their collective. In another episode, an experiment by Wesley Crusher gone awry led to nanites developing a collective intelligence and interfering with ship systems. The nanites are eventually deposited on another planet to establish their own civilization.

On the television show Red Dwarf, nanobots played a notable role in series VII to IX. Nanobots are nanotechnology created to be a self-repair system for androids like Kryten as they can also change anything into anything else. Kryten's nanobots grow bored of their duties and take over the ship Red Dwarf, leaving the crew to try and recapture it aboard the smaller Starbug. In the end the ship they are chasing is actually a smaller Red Dwarf built by the nanobots (which evaded their scanners in the end by coming aboard Starbug), with the rest being changed into a planet. Once the crew discover this and find the nanobots, they force them to rebuild Red Dwarf (as well as Dave Lister's then-missing arm). In the end, the nanobots build an enhanced Red Dwarf based on the original design plans. They also resurrect the original full crew killed in the first episode.

The episode "The New Breed" of the show Outer Limits featured nanobots.

Nanobots are featured during the Sci-Fi Channel era of Mystery Science Theater 3000, where they were known as "nanites". They were depicted as microscopic, bug-like, freestanding robots with distinct personalities.

Nanotechnology appear several times in the TV series Stargate SG-1 and Stargate Atlantis, in the form of the replicators and the Asurans, respectively. A "nanovirus" is also seen in Stargate Atlantis.

In Cowboy Bebop: The Movie (2001), a criminal blows up a tanker trunk containing a nanobot virus that instantly kills thousands.

In the 2003 film Agent Cody Banks, a scientist creates nanobots programmed to clean up oil spills.

In the 2004 film I, Robot, nanites are used to wipe out artificial intelligence in the event of a malfunction and are depicted as a liquid containing tiny silver objects.

In the 2005 Doctor Who consecutive episodes "The Empty Child" and "The Doctor Dances", a metal cylinder falls from space and lands in World War II-era London, releasing nanobots which transform every human they come into contact with into gas mask-wearing zombies.

In the 2008 film The Day the Earth Stood Still, the alien robot "GORT" disintegrates into a swarm of self-replicating nanobots shaped like bugs that cover Earth and destroy all humans and artificial structures by seemingly devouring them within seconds.

The revamped Knight Rider television series and TV movie incorporate nanotechnology into the Knight Industries Three Thousand (KITT), allowing it to change color and shape, as well as providing abilities such as self-regeneration.

In the 2009 film G.I. Joe: The Rise of Cobra, the main plot is to save the world from a warhead containing deadly nanobots called the "Nanomites", which if detonated over a city could destroy it in hours.

The popular NBC science fiction series Revolution is based on a worldwide blackout due to the manipulation of nanotechnology.

In the Cartoon Network series Generator Rex (2010), a failed experiment five years prior to the series' events caused nanites to spread throughout Earth, infecting most of its population. These nanites can activate involuntarily at any time, transforming the host into a monstrous form known as an E.V.O. The protagonist, Rex Salazar, is an E.V.O. who retains his human appearance and is able to cure other E.V.O.s and manipulate his nanites to form various constructs.

In the Ben 10 series, there is a nanotechnology-based alien species called Nanochips, who first appeared in the live-action film Ben 10: Alien Swarm.

Nanotechnology is featured heavily within the Terminator film series. The 1991 film Terminator 2: Judgment Day and 2015 film Terminator: Genisys feature the T-1000 terminator. The T-1000 is composed of Mimetic Polyalloy, a liquid metal that utilizes nanites for shapeshifting abilities, giving the T-1000 the ability to mimic anyone it samples through physical contact. It can also form its arms into blades and stabbing weapons and instantly recover from any damage. In the 2003 film Terminator 3: Rise of the Machines a new terminator, the T-X, also utilities Mimetic Polyalloy for shapeshifting abilities; like the T-1000 it can mimic anyone it touches. The T-X is also equipped with nanotechnological transjectors, and can infect and control other machines using nanites.

In Terminator Genisys, human resistance leader John Connor is infected with "machine phase matter" by a T-5000 terminator, transforming John into a "T-3000". The T-3000, like the T-1000 and T-X units, has shapeshifting and replication abilities. This unit's deadly structure gives the T-3000 the unique ability to instantly scatter its body into particles and reform at will.

In the 2014 film Transcendence, the uploaded consciousness of Will Caster (Johnny Depp) uses nanotechnology to turn himself, and the local townsfolk, into a self-healing defense force with superhuman strength.

In The Venture Bros. episode "Faking Miracles" a laboratory accident causes nanobots to enter Dean Venture's body. Billy Quizboy and Peter White take remote control of the nanobots, inadvertently torturing Dean to showcase the power of the nanobots to Dr. Venture. Eventually they are used, unbeknownst to Dean, to improve his intelligence so that he can pass an entrance examination for college. In the episode's post-credit scene, Dean painfully urinates the nanobots out of his body.

Nanotechnology is featured in the Marvel Cinematic Universe (MCU):

- In Black Panther (2018), the titular character's suit of armor is made of nanites, which are stored in a necklace when not in use.
- In Avengers: Infinity War (2018), Tony Stark's Iron Man Mark L Armor is made of nanites housed in Stark's arc reactor. Spider-Man's Iron Spider suit, also created by Stark, uses nanotechnology as well.
- In Avengers: Endgame (2019), Stark incorporates nanotechnology into his Mark LXXXV Armor as well as the Time Suits that the Avengers use to travel through the Quantum Realm.
- In Spider-Man: No Way Home (2021), Otto Octavius rips Peter Parker's nanotechnology from his Iron Spider suit, which bonds with Octavius's mechanical tentacles and allows Parker to disable them.

=== Video games ===
In PlanetSide and PlanetSide 2, nanites are used to fabricate weapons, vehicles, structures, equipment, and even resurrect human bodies. The development of rebirthing technology has allowed soldiers achieve immortality by downloading their consciousness into a new body composed entirely of nanites.

In Rise of the Robots and Rise 2: Resurrection, A nanomorth features a gynoid known as the Supervisor which composed of Chromium element, a liquid metal that utilizes nanites for shapeshifting abilities and a hive mind constructed from trillions of nanobots in a sealed central chamber within Metropolis 4 . Due to the corruption of the EGO virus which infect the Supervisor, she now controls the Electrocorp and all other machines in Metropolis 4.

In Total Annihilation nanobots are used to build structures and units.

In some games of the Mortal Kombat series, the character Smoke is a cloud of nanobots.

In System Shock 2 (1999), "nanites" are used as currency as well as a type of weapon ammo.

In Deus Ex (2000), nanotechnology is an important part of both the plot and game mechanics. A dangerous technology in the wrong hands, it provides a number of superhuman abilities to the protagonist along with novel approaches to weaponry such as the coveted Dragon's Tooth Sword.

The MMORPG Anarchy Online (2001) is set on a planet with well-developed nanotechnology, which generally is used as magic in fantasy-themed games.

In James Bond 007: Everything or Nothing (2004) follows James Bond as he dismantles a plot by ex-KGB agent Nikolai Diavolo to use stolen nanotechnology for world domination.

In Metal Gear Solid (1998), Solid Snake utilizes nanomachines to supply and administer adrenalin, nutrients, sugar, nootropics, and benzedrine and to recharge a Codec's battery. Metal Gear Solid 4 (2008) featured a great deal of nanotechnology, such as the Sons of the Patriots, an artificial intelligence/nanomachine network that regulated and enhanced the actions of every lawful combatant in the world. In Metal Gear Rising Revengeance (2013), the main antagonist Senator Armstrong also augments himself with nanotechnology.

In Red Faction (2001), nanotechnology is used on Mars to control miners, and Red Faction Guerilla (2009) features nanotechnology, in particular a device called the Nano Forge, as a major plot point.

The computer game Hostile Waters features a narrative involving nanotech assemblers.

In the Ratchet & Clank series, the health system involves nanotechnology. The nanotech can be upgraded by purchase in the first game, or by defeating enemies in other games of the series.

Nanotechnology is also found in Crysis (2007), Crysis 2 (2011), and Crysis 3 (2013). The protagonists of these games are equipped with a "Nano Suit", which enables them to become stronger, invisible, heavily armored, etc.

In Marvel: Ultimate Alliance 2 (2009), Reed Richards creates nanites that are meant to control the minds of supervillains. However, the nanites evolve into a group mind called the Fold which serves as the primary antagonist for the game.

In SpaceChem (2011), the player has to build molecular assembler/disassemblers using nanomachines called "Waldos" controlled by a visual programming language.

The Distant Stars expansion for Stellaris heavily features nanotechnology in many aspects.

In Goddess of Victory: Nikke (2022), the titular character's brain is flooded with nanomachines referred to as NIMPH (Neuro-Implanted Machine for the Protection of Humans), which manipulate the synaptic connections of neurons to control the Nikke's memories. These are employed to erase familial memories to ensure they are made into ideal obedient humanoid weapons, not bound by human attachments. The NIMPHs are also utilized as a fetter to have codes that prevent them from disobeying humans as well as attacking them.

=== Comics and other media ===
In the manga series Battle Angel Alita: Last Order, nanotechnology is referenced numerously and its use is heavily restricted, owing to the loss of Mercury as a potential planetary colony due to a grey goo catastrophe. Its danger and control has become one of the main driving narratives in the story.

In Dx13: Nano A Mano - a manga series by Kirupagaren Kanni - the protagonist uses nanobots to create a giant mecha, which is remotely controlled by custom-built equipment such as electronic glove, microphones, cameras, etc.

Nanomites appear in the G.I. Joe Reinstated series published by Devil's Due.

In the anime and manga series Black Cat, Eve is able to manipulate nanomachines. Nanobots are used for a variety of purposes, from turning victims into berserk warriors to granting Creed Diskenth immortality.

In the anime and manga series To Love-Ru, the Transformation Weapons Golden Darkness and Mea Kurosaki have nanomachines within them.

In the anime and manga series Project ARMS, the ARMS are weapons made from many nanomachines imbued into compatible biological beings, granting them a great variety of combative abilities and regeneration. The four protagonists each have an ARMS that have artificial intelligence, but the Keith series and the modulated ARMS do not.

In the LEGO franchise BIONICLE, it is eventually revealed that all characters from the 2001–2008 storyline are biomechanical nanobots (though roughly human-sized, given the size of the gigantic robot they inhabit (12,192 km tall)).

One of the earliest appearances of nanotech in comics is the Technovore, introduced in the series Iron Man (1993). Technovore is a technological creature made of nanomachines that has an insectoid appearance.

In several X-Men storylines, nano-Sentinels appear, either used to modify humans into Prime Sentinels, or to infect mutants and attack their cells. Karima Shapandar is an Omega Prime Sentinel, a powerful type of Prime Sentinel.

== See also ==
- Nanopunk
- Transhumanism
- Nanomedicine
