= Songs of Muad'Dib =

1992 poetry collection by Frank Herbert

Songs of Muad'Dib: The Poetry of Frank Herbert
- Author: Frank Herbert; Brian Herbert
- Language: English
- Series: Dune series
- Genre: science fiction poetry
- Published: 1992
- Publisher: Ace Books
- Publication place: United States
- Media type: Print
- Pages: 109 xiii, 111 pages
- ISBN: 0-441-77427-X
- OCLC: 25980728

Songs of Muad'Dib: The Poetry of Frank Herbert is a 1992 collection of poems written by Frank Herbert and edited by his son Brian, published by Ace Books in May 1992. Many of the poems are related to Herbert's Dune science fiction series—"Muad'Dib" is an in-universe epithet of Paul Atreides, a series protagonist.

== Contents ==
The book opens with an introduction by Frank Herbert's son, Brian Herbert. The book itself contains 86 poems, most of which are "Brian Herbert's poetic translations of brief passages from his father's science fiction novels" (primarily from Soul Catcher, The White Plague, Dune, Dune Messiah, Children of Dune, and Heretics of Dune; 18 had not been previously published).

== Reception ==
In 1992 the book was reviewed by Gary K. Wolfe for Locus and Tony Manna for Voice of Youth Advocates.

Manna's review was positive, calling the book a collection of "eloquent, sometimes puzzling, poems" that should be well received by Herbert fans and inspire those not familiar with his works to pick them up. Manna notes that "the poems reflect tiny impressions of character, incident, atmosphere, and emotional climate, capturing in miniature the entire sweep of mood..., conflict..., or relationship... which permeates the immense and complex stories from which the poems are derived".

Wolfe's review of the collection was much more critical. Wolfe wrote that "It's not so much that Herbert is a bad poet - some of the pieces from Soul Catcher do a good job of capturing the mood and rhythm of Native American verse - but that he never really pretended to be a poet at all. Most of what's here was written not so much as poetic expression as it was to help give texture to imaginary societies; yanked out of those contexts, it sounds peculiar at best." Wolfe also commented that three of the poems in Songs... originate from The White Plague, but that work contains another poem which was not, speculating that it was perhaps "too racy". Wolfe concludes that the book makes a "pretty weak memorial to Herbert" (Frank Herbert died in 1986, several years before the Songs... were published by his son), suggesting that its publication amounted to little more than a marketing stunt aimed to keep the Dune franchise alive.
