= Dune short stories =

Short stories by Frank Herbert, Brian Herbert, and Kevin J. Anderson

The Road to Dune (2005) US 1st edition cover

A series of Dune short stories have been written that relate to the Dune novels by Frank Herbert, Brian Herbert and Kevin J. Anderson. Some of these stories were originally available for download from the official Dune website, released in a promotional capacity in conjunction with the Brian Herbert/Kevin J. Anderson novels. "Dune: A Whisper of Caladan Seas", "Dune: Hunting Harkonnens", "Dune: Whipping Mek", and "Dune: The Faces of a Martyr" were later published as part of the collection The Road to Dune (not to be confused with the Frank Herbert short work of the same name) released in September 2005. "Dune: Sea Child" was published in Elemental, a 2006 benefit anthology for children who survived the 2004 Indian Ocean tsunami, and was later made available as part of the paperback edition of The Road to Dune. "Dune: Treasure in the Sand" was published online in 2006 at Jim Baen's Universe, and was later made available as part of the paperback edition of Hunters of Dune. "Dune: Wedding Silk" was released June 12, 2011 in the Dune e-book short story collection Tales of Dune, which also included previously published stories "Dune: Sea Child" and "Dune: Treasure in the Sand." "Dune: Red Plague" was released on November 1, 2016, followed by "Dune: The Waters of Kanly" in October 17, 2017. "Blood of the Sardaukar" was released in March 2019. "Dune: The Edge of a Crysknife" and "Dune: Imperial Court" released on June 28, 2022 in the novella collection Sands of Dune, which also included "The Waters of Kanly" and "Blood of the Sardaukar", which had previously only been published in other short story anthologies.

Boom! Studios published multiple comic adaptations based on stories by Brian Herbert and Kevin J. Anderson.

== By Frank Herbert ==
=== "The Road to Dune" ===
"The Road to Dune" is a short story written by Frank Herbert, originally published in 1985 in the short story collection Eye

It takes the form of a guidebook for pilgrims to Arrakis, illustrated by Welsh artist Jim Burns. The work takes place after the fall of Padishah Emperor Shaddam IV and the ascension of Paul Atreides to the throne in the original novel Dune. The short story discusses the major sites in the capital city, Arrakeen, including the Grand Palace and Temple of Alia. It also features images (with descriptions) of some of the devices and characters seen in the novels, including Paul's personal ornithopter, an Ixian glowglobe, Princess Irulan, Duncan Idaho, and Reverend Mother Mohiam.

== By Brian Herbert and Kevin J. Anderson ==
=== "Dune: A Whisper of Caladan Seas" ===
"A Whisper of Caladan Seas", by Brian Herbert and Kevin J. Anderson, was published in the 1999 issue of Amazing Stories. It was the first official Dune written work since the death of Frank Herbert, and the first collaboration between Brian Herbert and Anderson. It was later reprinted in the 2001 short story collection Dogged Persistence, and in September 2005 in the collection The Road to Dune.

The story takes place during the Harkonnen attack on Arrakis during the course of the original Dune by Frank Herbert. It depicts a group of Atreides soldiers trapped in a cave in the Shield Wall outside Arrakeen. One of the soldiers, a master story teller, recounts tales of Caladan, the sea-covered ancestral homeworld of House Atreides. A group of Fremen warriors find the soldiers shortly after and discover that the soldiers have all magically drowned — a fate that has never happened previously on the desert planet of Arrakis.

==== Adaptation ====
In December 2021, Boom! Studios published a one-shot comic adaptation of A Whisper of Caladan Seas written by the original authors Brian Herbert and Kevin J. Anderson.

=== "Dune: Hunting Harkonnens" ===
"Hunting Harkonnens", by Brian Herbert and Kevin J. Anderson, was first released online in 2002 prior to the release of the first Legends of Dune novel, Dune: The Butlerian Jihad; it was later published in the 2005 collection The Road to Dune.

In the short story, Ulf and Katarina Harkonnen and their son Piers (the parents and brother of Xavier Harkonnen) are travelling to Salusa Secundus when they are attacked by thinking machines under the command of General Agamemnon, a cymek. The Harkonnen ship is severely damaged and the 20-year-old Piers is ejected in an escape pod. He lands on the planet Caladan and meets a band of primitives who assist him in taking vengeance against the cymeks.

=== "Dune: Whipping Mek" ===
"Whipping Mek", by Brian Herbert and Kevin J. Anderson, appeared online in 2003 prior to the release of the second Legends of Dune novel, Dune: The Machine Crusade; it was later published in the collection The Road to Dune.

In the story, young Vergyl Tantor is serving in the Army of the Jihad on Giedi Prime during the Butlerian Jihad when his mentor and adopted brother Xavier Harkonnen arrives for repairs to be done to his battered fleet of warships. Vergyl, eager to fight the Thinking Machines, is pleased to encounter a mercenary from Ginaz who uses a captured machine for training purposes.

=== "Dune: The Faces of a Martyr" ===
"The Faces of a Martyr", by Brian Herbert and Kevin J. Anderson, was first released online in 2004 prior to the release of the third Legends of Dune novel, Dune: The Battle of Corrin; it was re-published in the 2005 collection The Road to Dune.

By the time of this short story, Leaders Xavier Harkonnen, Iblis Ginjo and Serena Butler are dead, but the Butlerian Jihad continues. The Army of the Jihad attack the Tlulaxa homeworld as vengeance for their actions in The Machine Crusade; one scientist, however, escapes to thinking machine territory. There he offers his services to the evermind Omnius, and sets about creating a clone of Serena. Meanwhile, in the League of Nobles, Vorian Atreides attempts to combat the slurs on Xavier's name by confronting Ginjo's wife.

=== "Dune: Sea Child" ===
"Sea Child", by Brian Herbert and Kevin J. Anderson, was published on May 16, 2006 in the tsunami benefit anthology Elemental; it was re-released in the paperback edition of The Road to Dune, in the June 12, 2011 collection Tales of Dune, and in the July 17, 2017 collection Tales of Dune: Expanded Edition.

It takes place during the events of Chapterhouse: Dune, and focuses on the Honored Matre invasion of the Bene Gesserit planet Buzzell, the only source of precious soostones. Corysta is a banished Reverend Mother, sent to Buzzell for the crime of loving her child and refusing to give it up to the Bene Gesserit's Breeding Mistresses. On Buzzell, and under Honored Matre oppression, Corysta comes across a Phibian baby outcast from the main group. Phibians have been brought to Buzzell by the Matres to harvest the soostones for them; as the Phibians are capable of breathing underwater as well as on land, they can dive deeper and farther from shore than any human can. After Corysta raises the child for months, the Matres find out and attempt to use Corysta's attachment to coerce her into revealing the location of the Bene Gesserit homeworld, Chapterhouse. Corysta refuses, and the Matres take the Phibian child away.

=== "Dune: Treasure in the Sand" ===
"Treasure in the Sand", by Brian Herbert and Kevin J. Anderson, was published in August 2006 online at Jim Baen's Universe; its events take place between Hunters of Dune and Sandworms of Dune. It was re-released on June 26, 2007 in the paperback edition of Hunters of Dune, and later collected in the June 12, 2011 collection Tales of Dune) and in the July 17, 2017 collection Tales of Dune: Expanded Edition.

=== "Dune: Wedding Silk" ===
"Wedding Silk", by Brian Herbert and Kevin J. Anderson was published on June 12, 2011 in the collection Tales of Dune. It was devised originally as part of their 2008 novel Paul of Dune, but was ultimately left out of the final version. The story was later collected in the July 17, 2017 collection Tales of Dune: Expanded Edition.

"Dune: Wedding Silk" features Duncan Idaho and a young Paul Atreides exploring the jungles of the planet Ecaz.

=== "Dune: Red Plague" ===
"Red Plague", by Brian Herbert and Kevin J. Anderson, was published on November 1, 2016 on the website Tor.com. The story was later collected in the July 17, 2017 collection Tales of Dune: Expanded Edition.

"Dune: Red Plague" takes place immediately prior to the events of Navigators of Dune, which was published on September 13, 2016. In the story, industrialist Josef Venport is in a bitter feud with Butlerian leader Manford Torondo. The population of the planet Walgis, loyal to the Butlerian cause, is dying of a virulent disease called the Red Plague, and Dr. Rohan Zim of the Suk School attempts to persuade Venport to intervene, helping the physician to deliver a vaccine.

=== "Dune: The Waters of Kanly" ===
"The Waters of Kanly", by Brian Herbert and Kevin J. Anderson, was published on October 17, 2017 in the anthology Infinite Stars edited by Bryan Thomas Schmidt. The story was later included in the collection Sands of Dune, released on June 28, 2022.

"Dune: The Waters of Kanly" takes place during the events of Frank Herbert's novel Dune. The story chronicles Gurney Halleck's plan of revenge against the Harkonnens for assassinating Duke Leto Atreides.

==== Adaptation ====
In May 2022, Boom! Studios began a 4 issue comic adaptation of The Waters of Kanly written by the original authors Brian Herbert and Kevin J. Anderson. It concluded in August 2022.

=== "Dune: Blood of the Sardaukar" ===
"Blood of the Sardaukar", by Brian Herbert and Kevin J. Anderson, was published on March 19, 2019 in the anthology Unfettered III, edited by Shawn Speakman. On July 28, 2021, a graphic novel adaptation was released. The story was later included in the collection Sands of Dune, released on June 28, 2022.

"Dune: Blood of the Sardaukar" takes place during the events of Frank Herbert's novel Dune. It follows the child of a betrayed nobleman who is trained as one of the Emperor's Sardaukar warriors.

==== Adaptation ====
In July 2021, Boom! Studios published a one-shot comic adaptation of Blood of the Sardaukar written by the original authors Brian Herbert and Kevin J. Anderson.

=== "Dune: The Edge of a Crysknife" ===
"The Edge of a Crysknife", by Brian Herbert and Kevin J. Anderson, was published on June 28, 2022 in the collection Sands of Dune. An excerpt was published on the Tor/Forge blog on April 16, 2022.

The story takes place before the events of the Prelude to Dune trilogy. It is a prequel novella about the Fremen woman who will become the Shadout Mapes.

=== "Dune: Imperial Court" ===
"Imperial Court", by Brian Herbert and Kevin J. Anderson, was published on June 28, 2022 in the collection Sands of Dune.

The story is set 10,000 years before the events in Frank Herbert's novel Dune, and not long after the events of the prequel novel Navigators of Dune by Brian Herbert and Kevin J. Anderson. It explores more of what brought about the blood feud between the Atreides and Harkonnens.
