= Dune: The Heir of Caladan =

2022 novel by B. Herbert and Anderson

- First edition cover
- Authors: Brian Herbert; Kevin J. Anderson
- Language: English
- Series: The Caladan Trilogy
- Genre: Science fiction
- Publisher: Tor Books
- Publication date: November 22, 2022
- Publication place: United States
- Pages: 416
- Preceded by: Dune: The Lady of Caladan

The Heir of Caladan is a science fiction novel by Brian Herbert and Kevin J. Anderson, set in the Dune universe created by Frank Herbert. It is the third book in the Caladan Trilogy of prequels. The novel was released on November 22, 2022, and was preceded by Dune: The Duke of Caladan (2020) and Dune: The Lady of Caladan (2021).

== Plot summary ==
CHOAM’s Ur-Director, Malina Aru, discovers that damning secrets about the Great Houses collected by CHOAM have been stolen by her son, Jaxson, and that Leto Atreides has become a follower of Jaxson. Jaxson’s faction also receives advanced shield nullifiers from Viscount Giandro Tull, but Emperor Shaddam sends the Sardaukar under Colonel Bashar Japati Kolona to destroy House Tull after the Viscount poisons all of his thoroughbred horses. Glossu Rabban and Piter de Vries torture Gurney Halleck and obtain Leto’s explanation of his plan to infiltrate the Noble Commonwealth. Rabban’s uncle, Baron Vladimir Harkonnen, agrees to deliver secret shipments of melange to Jaxson in exchange for eventually being declared Emperor, but also notifies Count Hasimir Fenring concerning Jaxson’s presence on Arrakis; Fenring executes his Mentat, Grix Dardik, for attempting to report the Baron’s dealings to the Emperor. Thufir Hawat secretly arrives on Lankiveil and rescues Gurney from the Harkonnens; Leto entrusts Wellington Yueh with a new recording explaining his actions. After the Baron reveals Leto’s involvement, Shaddam orders Kolona to destroy House Atreides as well as House Londine. Kolona eliminates House Londine, personally killing Rajiv Londine on Cuarte. House Londine’s Chief Administrator, Rodundi, who arranged their role in the Caladan ailar drug operations, is revealed as a Face Dancer working for Tleilaxu Master Arafa, and escapes to join Jaxson on Nossus with Rajiv’s face.

Paul Atreides and Duncan Idaho travel to the southern continent of Caladan for a hunting game, but are discovered and pursued separately by agents of Chaen Marek's drug operations; Duncan is imprisoned whilst Paul hides among the Muadh villagers, and Paul rescues Duncan with the Muadh warrior Yar Zell, resulting in Marek’s death, and the Muadh holy mountain desacrated by the Tleilaxu begins to rebuild. On Bellaris, the Baron summons the Sardaukar while selling his illegal melange surplus to Jaxson, and the Sardaukar discover Nossus as the capital of the Noble Commonwealth. The Sardaukar attack House Tull on Elegy, and Viscount Tull destroys his own palace in a pseudo-atomic explosion when it is besieged; Reverend Mother Cordana rescues Jessica. When Nossus is targeted, Jaxson, Leto, and the other Noble Commonwealth rebels are protected by Tull's nullifiers and offered sanctuary by Malina, who has actually convinced Jaxson's siblings that he is their enemy and summons the Sardaukar to Tanegaard, revealing herself as the source of the information about Leto and Rajiv Londine’s involvement and the location of Jaxson’s faction. Jaxson's supporters take his brother Frankos, the CHOAM President, hostage and seal themselves in the CHOAM fortress vault with other hostages. Shaddam’s wife Aricatha proposes to treat with Leto as he may be working to undermine Jaxson; Malina gives her a ring stolen from the Ixians who developed Jaxson’s memory stone containing the black archives. Jaxson takes Aricatha hostage and rejects her and Leto’s sanctuary agreement. Leto secretly reveals himself and Aricatha gives him the Ixian ring. On Wallach IX, Jessica prepares Brom, pushed as a potential Kwisatz Haderach by Mohiam, for the spice Agony, but he dies in the overly rushed process.

When the Baron requests Caladan, Fenring steals swaths of CHOAM files from the vaults during the distraction of the lockdown. The Face Dancer disguised as Londine replaces Frankos and Aricatha's guard and rescues Frankos, but kills and replaces Aricatha, witnessed by a returning Frankos. With this news, Shaddam bombards the vault; Leto tackles Jaxson and he and the supposed Aricatha destroy the memory stone. The Sardaukar arrive in Cala City; Paul tries to convince Kolona of Leto’s true intentions, and is finally saved by Yueh returning Leto’s latest recording, which he had stolen to appease the Harkonnens‘ threats. Jaxson reveals more densely packed files about Corrino crimes in a Richesian data coil with a transmitter, but this has already been destroyed by Malina. With the stolen files, Fenring finally discovers the black market Orgiz spice dealings of the Baron and Malina, but expunges Malina’s name from the records. Jaxson accepts ailar barra ferns from Malina to avoid execution. Leto explains his infiltration plan and Gurney Halleck’s interception to Shaddam and the harm to Fenring’s investment caused by Rabban’s attack on the moonfish industry; Shaddam decides to punish the Harkonnens, but is secretly upset that Caladan was saved in time. Leto is celebrated by the Great Houses for stopping Jaxson; the entire Landsraad formally honours him on proposal of Archduke Armand Ecaz and asks Shaddam to reward House Atreides; Fenring reveals the Harkonnens' involvement with Orgiz to the Emperor and suggests that Arrakis be transferred to the Atreides. Shaddam sends Kolona’s fleet to organise the transferral by force. Malina makes Frankos resign as CHOAM President as a scapegoat. Duncan and Paul fight and kill the disguised Twisted Swordmaster Egan Saar, who had betrayed Feyd-Rautha to seek personal revenge on Paul, and the Baron’s contest between his nephews ends in failure. Harishka, Mohiam, and Cordana send Jessica back to Caladan, ordering an Atreides daughter. Paul and Duncan visit the Muadh villages again before Duncan leaves for Arrakis. Mohiam goes to Caladan to examine Paul, their next Kwisatz Haderach candidate, with a gom jabbar.
