= Dune: The Lady of Caladan =

2021 novel by Brian Herbert and Kevin J. Anderson

- First edition cover
- Authors: Brian Herbert; Kevin J. Anderson
- Language: English
- Series: The Caladan Trilogy
- Genre: Science fiction
- Publisher: Tor Books
- Publication date: September 21, 2021
- Publication place: United States
- Media type: Print (hardcover)
- Pages: 416
- ISBN: 978-1250765055
- Preceded by: Dune: The Duke of Caladan
- Followed by: Dune: The Heir of Caladan

Dune: The Lady of Caladan is a 2021 science fiction novel by Brian Herbert and Kevin J. Anderson, set in the Dune universe created by Frank Herbert. It is the second book in the Caladan Trilogy of prequels. The novel was released on September 21, 2021, by Tor Books. It was preceded by Dune: The Duke of Caladan in October 2020, and was followed by Dune: The Heir of Caladan in October 2022.

== Plot summary ==
A year before the events of Dune, Lady Jessica is recalled from Caladan by the Bene Gesserit after the dying Sister Lethea demands to see Jessica. Sister Cordana believes Lethea wants Jessica dead, but Sister Ruthine trusts Lethea's warning that Jessica's 14-year-old son Paul Atreides is a danger to the Sisterhood. Jessica befriends Sister Xora, who despises Lethea. Xora's son Brom was separated from her by the Bene Gesserit after her affair with a Sardaukar officer as the concubine of Baron Onar Molay seventeen years ago. Jessica tells Xora about Paul's prophetic dreams.

Duke Leto Atreides travels to Kaitain to gain favor in the Imperium. Count Hasimir Fenring offers to help him influence Emperor Shaddam and elevate House Atreides by adopting Fenring's advice. The aristocrat Lord Atikk invokes kanly (vendetta) against Leto at the imperial court after the death of Atikk's son as a result of the Caladan ailar drug, despite Leto's destruction of the drug fields. Lord Atikk is later poisoned in his chambers, presumably by Count Fenring, winning Leto more support. During Leto's stay, Onar Molay also returns to Kaitain after many years. Leto temporarily leaves Paul in charge of House Atreides. Swordmaster Duncan Idaho attempts to find the girl in the desert appearing in Paul's dreams by searching the dune areas of Caladan. After flying to the sand dunes, Paul determines his dreams do not take place in the area, seeking a larger desert. Archivar Torono warns Paul and Duncan that the Muadh people may be threatened by new restarted drug operations.

Lethea secretly tells Jessica that she believes Paul is the Kwisatz Haderach. Xora helps Jessica secretly locate a message cylinder to contact Pau, but then reveals this as a test to betray her to Mother Superior Harishka as disloyal. Jessica is assigned to the planet Elegy, where Viscount Giandro Tull has stopped financing the Sisterhood, in order to seduce Tull as his concubine, while Xora is sent to replace Jessica as Leto's concubine. Xora attempts to reconcile with Jessica before leaving but is rejected.

Shaddam sends Colonel Bashar Jopati Kolona to Elegy to find Jaxson Aru, the leader of the violent wing of the Noble Commonwealth rebellion. Tull denies that Jaxson is hiding on Elegy. Jaxson visits the Tleilaxu capital city of Bandalong to alter his face into a combination of his features and those of his father Brondon Aru with the help of Tleilaxu Master Arafa. Shaddam's Bene Gesserit wife Aricatha is secretly a member of the official, moderate faction of the Noble Commonwealth movement, led by CHOAM's Ur-Director Malina Aru, Jaxson's mother. Malina's plans have been disrupted by Shaddam's elimination of House Verdun, since Duke Fausto Verdun was an important inner CHOAM Director.

In order to fulfil his agreement with Malina Aru, Baron Vladimir Harkonnen operates the secret Orgiz spice refinery on Arrakis, creating an unrecorded spice output to send illegally to CHOAM and evading the Emperor's harsh spice surtax enforced by Fenring as Spice Minister. Shaddam intends to host a large physical celebration of the wealth collected through the surtax, secretly planning to drop the coins upon the people at this display to prove the largesse of House Corrino. After seeing Malina's spinehounds, the Baron asks her to request the Tleilaxu breed two more for his nephew Feyd-Rautha, which Malina eventually delivers. Meanwhile, he challenges both his nephews to harm House Atreides; the winner of the challenge will become his heir. Rabban recruits the Harkonnen Mentat Piter de Vries on Lankiveil to sabotage Caladan's moonfish industry by breeding aquatic mites, while Feyd-Rautha hires Twisted Swordmaster Egan Saar to train to assassinate the Atreides. The Baron himself kidnaps the wife of Atreides Suk doctor Wellington Yueh while she is on a Bene Gesserit mission and arranges a private meeting with Yueh.

Jaxson sends Tleilaxu smuggler Chaen Marek back to Caladan to resume his drug operations in the southern continent; after failing to find Duke Leto, he visits his sister Jalma on Pliesse and his brother Frankos on Kaitain to enlist their support against Malina. Malina learns of these visits and considers allying with Jaxson. Fenring asks Leto to marry Vikka Londine, the son of Count Rajiv Londine, a disruptive noble protesting against the surtax, in order to help disgrace the Count, before returning to Arrakis with his erratic failed Mentat Grix Dardik. Fenring realises spice is still being smuggled from Arrakis and enlists Esmar Tuek's smugglers to help him find the perpetrators. Leto ultimately rejects Fenring's plan and departs for Caladan, causing Shaddam to mock Fenring's attempts to help Leto. Fenring follows Leto to Caladan to invest in the moonfish industry, but secretly asks Dardik to determine whether Leto is involved with the Noble Commonwealth.

Chaen Marek visits Count Londine, secretly a Noble Commonwealth member and the distributor of the Caladan drug in Lord Atikk's court, to arrange the shipment of the new ailar. Esmar Tuek's agent Bena witnesses Rabban at the Orgiz refinery. Lethea kills herself after claiming that Jessica is a danger, leading Ruthine to give Xora and sisters Aislan and Taula the mission of killing Paul, while Brom visits Jessica in her holding cell and offers to help her. Ruthine and Sister Jiara attempt to assassinate Jessica in her cell but she escapes with Brom. They reach the spaceport but are discovered by a returning Gaius Helen Mohiam. Mohiam sends Jessica to Elegy, while Mohiam and Cordana find Ruthine has killed herself by stopping her breath. Rabban's mites cripple the moonfish industry, thwarting Fenring's attempts to support it. In response, Leto orders Duncan and Gurney Halleck to attack Lankiveil. Jaxson approaches Leto and gives him the coordinates to the Noble Commonwealth. At Shaddam's celebration of the surtax, Jaxson blows up the ship holding the coins, killing thousands, influencing Leto to infiltrate the Noble Commonwealth as a spy and send Gurney to inform the Emperor of his plan.

Esmar Tuek reveals to Fenring that Orgiz, thought to have been destroyed decades ago, is being used in covert operations. In turn, the Baron orders Rabban to entirely destroy Orgiz and all of its operators. Viscount Tull warns Jessica not to seduce him, and she ultimately convinces him to let her secretly travel to Caladan and back. Jaxson informs Leto that his next target is the planet Issimo III, the site of a famine, but Leto convinces him to deliver food supplies rather than accelerating the famine. Jaxson then takes Leto to the core of the Noble Commonwealth on Nossus. Gurney is kidnapped on Parmentier by Piter's agennts. On Caladan, Paul and Duncan kill two of Ruthine's followers. When Xora arrives, Paul and Thufir Hawat reject her claims to be Leto's new concubine and send her to a hotel. Saar reaches Caladan and checks into the same hotel, killing Xora after she claims to be the Lady of Caladan, then returns to a disappointed Feyd-Rautha. The Baron discovers Leto's plan to infiltrate the Noble Commonwealth from Piter. Jessica fights and kills Aislan and Taula, then reunites with Paul before departing. On Elegy, she bonds with Viscount Tull.

== Reception ==
Ryan Britt of Den of Geek wrote, "When Dune begins, this matter has more or less been settled, but how? Dune: The Lady of Caladan, a new prequel novel in the Dune series, answers that question and then some. The latest in a long line of Dune prequel and sequel novels from Brian Herbert and Kevin J. Anderson, The Lady of Caladan tells the story of Jessica's tribulations and adventures in the year before the original book begins. And, in doing so, The Lady of Caladan enriches the entire saga. If, after re-reading Frank Herbert's Dune, or, in anticipation of the new film, you want to get a greater sense of Lady Jessica, this book delivers. Here's how The Lady of Caladan fits into the Dune timeline, and why it's a fantastic way of reframing the larger story." Jordan Maison of Cinelinx stated, "Even though The Lady of Caladan brings to mind some familiar problems, I find myself greatly enjoying this new trilogy. I especially had fun with this one. There's plenty of action, intrigued [sic], and all those elements you've come to expect from the franchise. The middle novel does an excellent job of wrapping up earlier storylines, while introducing some others I'm eager to see payoff when the final book arrives next year."
