= Dune: The Duke of Caladan =

2020 science fiction novel

- First edition cover
- Authors: Brian Herbert; Kevin J. Anderson
- Language: English
- Series: The Caladan Trilogy
- Genre: Science fiction
- Publisher: Tor Books
- Publication date: October 13, 2020
- Publication place: United States
- Media type: Print (hardcover)
- Pages: 320
- ISBN: 9781250764744
- Preceded by: Dune: House Corrino
- Followed by: Dune: The Lady of Caladan

Dune: The Duke of Caladan is a 2020 science fiction novel by Brian Herbert and Kevin J. Anderson, set in the Dune universe created by Frank Herbert. It is the first book in the Caladan Trilogy of prequels. The novel was released on October 13, 2020, by Tor Books, and was followed by Dune: The Lady of Caladan in September 2021. The final novel in the trilogy is Dune: The Heir of Caladan, was released in November 2022.

== Reception ==
Publishers Weekly review stated, "Herbert and Anderson's tepid 15th foray into the universe of Herbert's father's Dune novels (after Tales of Dune) adds little to the original series' mix of action, politics, magic, and religion... The passable prose and lackluster plot will limit this one's appeal to diehard fans only." Daniel Matters of Worldly Magazine wrote, "For anyone new to the Dune universe, Dune: The Duke of Caladan is an excellent place to start. Herbert and Anderson's crisp prose is easy to follow and does just the right amount of world building so that newcomers who have never read any other books in the Dune series are eased into the interconnected politics of the planets within the Imperium, and its many organisations and structures. Older fans will be happy to find that they are not oversaturated by Herbert and Anderson with information they already possess." Kelly Adams of Big Shiny Robot commented, "This is a fast-paced, fun read, and it's sure to help with the pangs of missing out on the film this year. If you have read the other Herbert/Anderson books, this is a wonderful addition to their stories. If your knowledge is limited to Dune, then it's easy to find your footing with these familiar characters and places. And if this is your first step into the Dune universe, it's a great first look into this world. However, the worldbuilding begun by Frank Herbert is vast and may be a bit overwhelming at first."
