= High-Opp =

Posthumous novel by Frank Herbert

- US first edition cover
- Author: Frank Herbert
- Language: English
- Genre: Science fiction
- Publisher: WordFire Press
- Publication date: March 11, 2012 (e-book); April 5, 2012 (paperback)
- Publication place: United States
- Media type: Print (E-book & Paperback)
- Pages: 232
- ISBN: 1-614-75038-6

High-Opp is a science fiction novel by American writer Frank Herbert, written between The Dragon in the Sea (1956) and Dune (1965), and published posthumously in 2012. It contains a foreword by Kevin J. Anderson, who co-authored many books in the Dune series with Frank Herbert's son, Brian Herbert.

Though the novel was never published in Herbert's lifetime, some elements of the story were used in his 1977 novel The Dosadi Experiment, sometimes word-for-word.

== Plot summary ==
On a dystopian future Earth, an ongoing series of opinion polls set the boundaries of the caste system: the high scored High-Opps are rewarded with luxury and privilege, while the low-opped struggle for comfort and survival in the crowded Labor Pool. When Senior Liaitor Daniel Movius falls from the upper ranks to the lowest depths of society, he faces the harsh and brutal conditions of the underworld and finds a brewing revolution in need of a leader.
