= Enemies & Allies =

2009 novel by Kevin J. Anderson

- Author: Kevin J. Anderson
- Genre: Superhero fiction
- Publisher: William Morrow and Company
- Publication date: May 2009
- Publication place: United States
- Media type: Print (hardcover, paperback), audiobook
- Pages: 326
- ISBN: 978-0-06-166255-3
- OCLC: 244659845

Enemies & Allies is a 2009 novel by American science fiction author Kevin J. Anderson. The book is set in the 1950s, in the midst of the Cold War, and follows Superman and Batman. Though suspicious of each other, they confront Lex Luthor who stages an international nuclear conflict and spreads fear of an alien invasion so that he can sell advanced weapons to governments. Themes used in the novel, reflective of the 1950s era, include alien invasion films, nuclear threats, and Cold War paranoia.

Anderson has written supporting novels in the past in established franchises, such as Star Wars and Dune. He had previously written about Superman in the 2007 novel The Last Days of Krypton. Enemies & Allies was published in May 2009 and met with mixed reviews which noted flat characterization but that it may be entertaining for comic book fans.

== Background ==
The novel Enemies & Allies uses the DC Comics characters Batman and Superman. It was written by science fiction author Kevin J. Anderson who, at the time of publication, was 47 years old and living in Colorado. He had been writing novels for the past 20 years and had 15 years' experience writing tie-in novels to existing franchises, such as The X-Files and Star Wars. He was best known for his prequel novels in the Dune franchise with co-author Brian Herbert. His latest novels in the Dune series were Paul of Dune, published in September 2008, and The Winds of Dune, which was released in August 2009, only several months after releasing Enemies & Allies. He gained experience writing in the comic book format by authoring the 2004–05 six issue miniseries JSA: Strange Adventures featuring the Justice Society of America. He had previously written a novel about the origins of Superman, The Last Days of Krypton published in 2007.

== Plot ==
The story takes place in the late 1950s. Gotham is a crime-ridden city with corrupt cops, but the crime rate has been hit hard by the vigilante actions of the Batman. Metropolis is the far opposite of Gotham; bright, uncorrupted, and protected by the super powered hero known as Superman. When interviewed by Daily Planet reporter Lois Lane, he revealed that he was an alien from Krypton. But to their surprise, no one, not even businessmen Lex Luthor and Bruce Wayne, believed that statement, even though someone like Wayne cannot explain how Superman can do what he does.

After fleeing another trap from the police, Batman returns home to meet (as Bruce Wayne) Clark Kent and Jimmy Olsen from Metropolis' Daily Planet for an interview. In Siberia, Luthor meets with his partner, General Ceridov, who reveals his slaves working day and night at the Gulag in search for strange and deadly green rocks. After showing him the violent Mutants that someone can become after long term exposure to the rocks, Luthor asks to have one for his journey home. Editor Perry White gives Lois and Clark the assignment of completing this month's "love advice" column, though Clark has troubles because he doesn't know how to help people by offering honest advice. Lois wants to investigate the possible illegal activates LuthorCorp have been performing, but needs concrete facts first. After Bruce finds out his father and Alfred Pennyworth's friend, Drayling, resigned from Wayne Enterprises because of the board of directors' corruption; Bruce discovers Wayne technology being sold to LuthorCorp from their offices, and bribes, blackmail, and threats, either to them or to their families, from their homes as Batman. Lois meets with LuthorCorp ex-employee, Blanche Rosen, who reveals her and many others were hired to construct a reactor in the Caribbean, but the site was dangerous, leaving many sick and left to die. This leads to Lois sneaking inside LuthorCorp, and reaching the assembly line and the secret maps, all of which prove Rosen's sayings. Clark sees Earth vs the Flying Saucers with Jimmy, a movie that seems to answer why no one believes Superman to be an alien, as well as makes Clark wonder about other existing aliens. His question seems to get answered when a UFO appears, traveling across the country. Superman flies to intercept along with seven F-100D Super Sabres, but a LuthorCorp aircraft fires a pulse beacon to disable the planes, and disappears with the UFO.

Batman heads to Luthor's mansion in Metropolis, and finds further evidence of Luthor's corrupted connections toward Wayne Enterprises. While discovering memos of Luthor being denied "his property" from Area 51, Batman discovers battlesuit designs based on Bruce's own Superman-related experiments, as well as a small case carrying the green rock from Siberia. Seeking poetic justice for the theft against him, Batman steals the green rock, which sets off alarms, Luthor and his security, to Batman's presence. Superman flies to Luthor's mansion to get answers regarding the UFO when he hears the alarms and sees Batman escaping. Knowing who he is, Superman stops Batman and carries him away en route to the authorities. While the two argue over the other being a creation or pawn of Luthor's, Batman removes his cape to escape, only for Superman to find him moments later. Wanting to know what he stole, Batman shows him the green rock, only for Superman to collapse in pain for the first time in his life. Batman uses this time to escape, while Superman tries to regain his strength. The next morning, Clark decides to investigate the UFO, and is assigned to go to Vegas to cover a crash in Arizona with Jimmy. At the same time, Luthor holds a press conference revealing he'd been robbed by Superman and Batman, much to the shock of the press. Lois goes to meet with Rosen again, only to discover she'd been murdered by a passerby. Bruce Wayne meets with his board members unannounced to reveal that he will now take over his family's business away from them, and reveals to the fearful board their dealings with LuthorCorp. Forbidding them to resign, even with the findings sent to Captain James Gordon, he tells them he won't press charges if they send over each department's research results to him, so he can send to Luthor what he wants to send, even if they don't really work.

Clark and Jimmy arrive in Arizona and disappointingly find out the flying saucer they came for is gone, but witnesses reveal where it went: Area 51. Luthor heads to his Caribbean island, self named Luthor Island, and meets with Ceridov again. Luthor shows off to Ceridov his Death Ray that would destroy any incoming missiles, which he plans Ceridov to fire upon the island to show it off. That way, Luthor sells it to the US, and Ceridov uses the "failure" to get more money for his military operations. Clark and Jimmy go see Invasion of the Body Snatchers, which makes them wonder if aliens really live among them. After being stopped from being close to Area 51, Superman heads there come night fall; at the same time, thanks to his connections and investigation, Batman arrives there too. Meeting each other, and after getting their stories straight, both Superman & Batman realize the "flying saucer" is a LuthorCorp prototype, making Batman suspicious, but disappointing Superman. Ceridov fires the Russian warheads to Metropolis just as Clark and Jimmy cover the United Nations meeting with the Americans and Soviets when missile alarms go off. Luthor fires his Death Ray, but to his shock and anger, they malfunction. Luckily, Superman speeds toward the warheads and with his strength, sends them all into space, saving the world. President Eisenhower awards Superman at a ceremony, with Superman happy Lois is there.

Months later, Luthor finishes his battlesuit plans, and meets with Senator McCarthy, and using McCarthy's own paranoia, makes him believe that Superman is an alien threat in disguise. Flying around the globe, and watching the Soviets, Superman ends up finding the Gulag in Siberia. When he comes close to the dome protecting the interior, he is hit with the green rocks that forces him to fall underground. News breaks that Russia have arrested a sick Superman, claiming him to be a spy, and the White House is unsure if he'll be free or not. Luthor returns to the Caribbean to fix his Death Ray and destroys Sputnik, hoping to fuel McCarthy's paranoia on an alien invasion. Ceridov calls Luthor and reveals he has Superman. Bruce and Alfred finish the Batplane, and the Dark Knight heads out to Siberia. Lois heads to the Caribbean, against Perry's wishes. Reaching Siberia, Batman sneaks into the Gulag, and frees Superman. The cries of the prisoners alert the guards and sound the alarm. Using mines and covering from their fire, Batman and Superman manage to escape. Ceridov sends out the Mutants, and when they reach the two heroes, Batman lays them down with his traps, making them fail in their pursuit. Ceridov is about to abuse them until they fight back, killing the guards in the process. He is chased into a reactor, sabotaging it from inside, and dying from radiation poisoning. Lois reaches Luthor Island, and is caught by Bertram in his LuthorCorp battlesuit. Lois confronts Luthor over his Soviet dealing, his crimes, and Superman. Luthor claims Superman being an alien makes him mysterious and dangerous, but Lois accuses him of being jealous. Luthor reveals that he will show the world that he is Earth's real protector by giving them a real threat.

Superman and Batman escape Siberia just as the reactor breaches and the Gulag explode. Still weak and trusting him after his help, Superman guides Batman to his Fortress of Solitude in the Arctic. Once inside, the impressed Dark Knight realizes Superman is indeed an alien; a revelation that makes both men one and the same given their origins of being orphans, as well as realizing the green rocks are from Krypton. Huge UFOs appear above Metropolis demanding a surrender of the planet or the cities will be destroyed. This is of course Luthor's doing: fake an alien invasion, come in to "save the day", and he will be everyone's hero. Broadcasting to the world to announce that he will save them, the LuthorCorp building opens to reveal its own Death Ray and destroys the first ship, and makes the other ships fight back. Superman and Batman arrive in Metropolis just as the UFOs are destroying skyscrapers. Knowing they are empty props created by Luthor, Superman and Batman single-handedly destroy each ship with the help of the Air Force; Superman saves Batman after the Death Ray attacks his Batplane, and destroys the Ray. Lois gets out of the cell she was in, and sees Superman is freed. Lois gets to a radio and successfully contacts the military to go to Luthor Island just as she's found by Luthor and Bertram. Bertram goes after her in his battlesuit, but destroys the control room by accident, killing the island's power. Superman hears from General Lane, Lois' father, where she is and Luthor Island. Flying at supersonic speed, Superman arrives at the island and fights Luthor's battlesuit army. While the fight is tough, Superman wins by knocking the men out inside their indestructible suits. Superman saves Lois from Luthor, ending the ordeal. As the Air Force arrives, Superman gives Lois a lift back home.

Thanks to Lois, Superman & Batman, Luthor is charged with mass murder, terrorism, corruption, and more, all of which Luthor doesn't deny, but credits himself for while preparing his own defence. Lois wonders why Clark isn't around when Superman appears, but that thought is cut short when Clark, Lois, and Jimmy head out for more adventures. In the Batcave, Bruce ponders the kryptonite he still has, and keeps it for safe keeping, hoping not to use it. Luthor is found guilty and sentenced to death, and expresses satisfaction when informed that the electric chair was built by LuthorCorp while already making plans for his own escape. Superman and Batman meet again in Gotham, agreeing that they both work best alone, though together can accomplish more. Superman promises not to reveal Batman is Bruce Wayne, a fact he discovered with his x-ray vision, but he is taken aback when Batman reveals not to reveal his secret identity, and calls him Clark.

== Style and themes ==
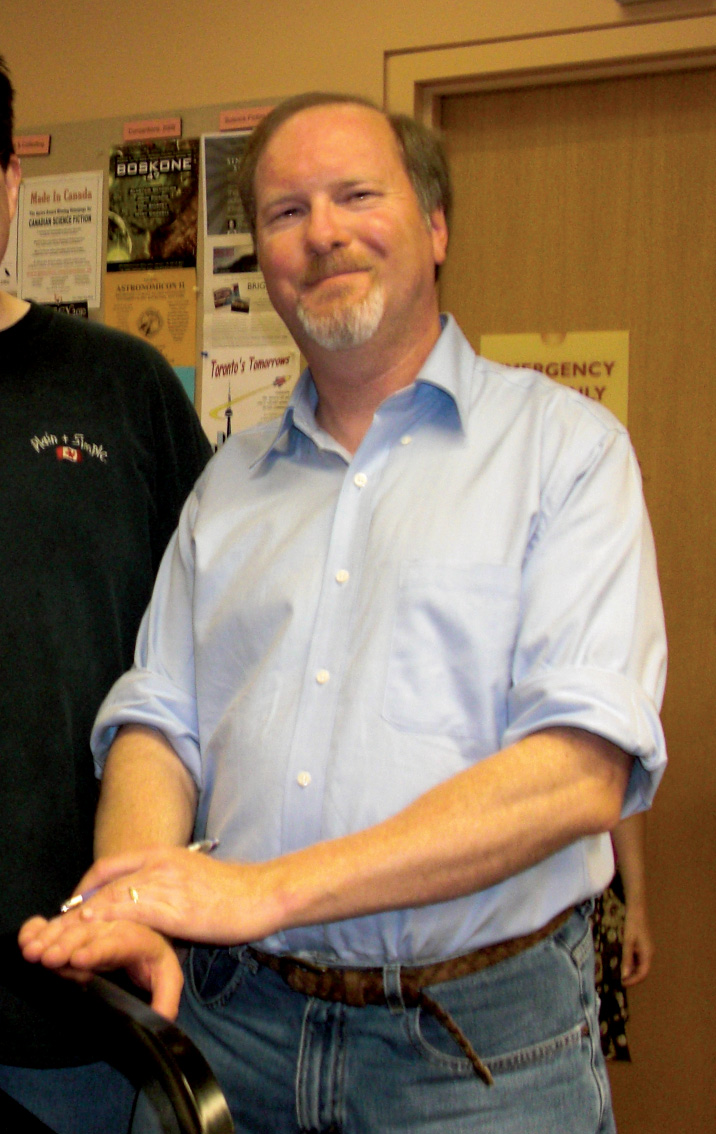
Author Kevin J. Anderson at an August 2009 book signing event.

The story is set in the DC Universe but is non-canon, similar to an Elseworlds story. The content is divided into 60 chapters which mostly alternate between the (third person) points-of-view of the two protagonists, Batman/Bruce Wayne and Superman/Clark Kent, though several chapters follow antagonists (Lex Luthor and Soviet General Anatoly Ceridov). While the novel is based on comic book characters, it consists solely of prose. Anderson commented on the difficulty in writing comics as prose stating that "in the comics, several pages of superpowered action can propel the story, but when you read it in a book, it's not quite so interesting. You need more parts to the story..."

Anderson sought to capture the nostalgic feel of the 1950s. In this effort, he used several themes associated with the time period, including alien invasion movies, nuclear threats, Cold War paranoia, and optimism in the future. About the time period, Anderson said that "it seemed like this was a time when you could say with a straight face, 'I'm fighting for truth, justice and the American way'". For the characters Anderson was picturing George Reeves's Superman and Noel Neill's Lois Lane as portrayed in the 1950s television series Adventures of Superman. One reviewer noted that Anderson's portrayal of Lex Luthor is that of the post-Crisis on Infinite Earths amoral businessman and Batman was more reminiscent of a 1930s-style or a "Year One"-style Batman where he is actively pursued by the police.

== Publication and reception ==
Enemies & Allies was published by William Morrow and Company, an imprint of HarperCollins. The novel was released as a hardcover in May 2009 and as a paperback in October 2010. Book reviewers had mixed reactions. The review in Publishers Weekly called it a "hokey, contrived imagining" of the team-up of Superman and Batman, concluding that it was "a schlocky mediocrity for die-hard fans only". Stacey Rottiers in Library Journal found Anderson's portrayal of Metropolis and Gotham City, as well as the "imposing feel of the Soviet presence" to be well done. Both the Publishers Weekly and Library Journal reviews noted flat characterization and recommended the novel to comic fans only. In Booklist, Carl Hays had a more positive review, writing that "Anderson keeps us guessing throughout with clever plot twists and some intriguing alternate cold war history". The review in Kirkus Reviews was also positive, saying that "this is a refreshing diversion from the grimness of The Dark Knight or the tedious Superman Returns. Injects a welcome dose of retro exuberance into the capes-and-tights routine".

== Audiobook ==
In May 2013, GraphicAudio released a full cast audiobook adaptation based on the novel, with five CDs and features a full cast, music, and sound effects.
