= The Road to Dune =

2005 written work collection

- First edition cover
- Editor: Patrick LoBrutto
- Authors: Frank Herbert; Brian Herbert; Kevin J. Anderson
- Audio read by: Scott Brick
- Cover artist: Stephen Youll
- Language: English
- Series: Dune franchise
- Genre: Science fiction
- Publisher: Tor Books
- Publication date: 2005
- Publication place: United States
- Media type: Print (Hardback)
- Pages: 489
- ISBN: 9780765312952

The Road to Dune is a collection of science fiction works and related material by American writers Frank Herbert, Brian Herbert, and Kevin J. Anderson. A companion book to the Dune novels, the book was released in September 2005.

== Contents ==
This companion work to the Dune novels includes an alternate novel based on Frank Herbert's original notes for his 1965 novel Dune, letters between Frank Herbert and his editor, the original article by Frank Herbert which inspired the creation of Dune — "They Stopped the Moving Sands" — as well as unused chapters from Dune and its sequel Dune Messiah (1969), and the short stories in the Dune universe written by Brian Herbert and Kevin J. Anderson.

=== Spice Planet ===
Spice Planet is an alternate Dune story written by Brian Herbert and Kevin J. Anderson based upon the original story outline that Frank Herbert made for Dune. It features House Linkam (a version of House Atreides) temporarily taking control of Duneworld from their rivals, House Hoskanner (the forerunner of the Harkonnens), to settle a dispute between them. The Hoskanners had received a monopoly concession on the recently discovered Duneworld, but as melange had grown in popularity in the Empire, other Houses had begun to dislike the Hoskanner's wealth and pushed House Linkam to challenge House Hoskanner. The Emperor, secretly allied with the Hoskanners, orders Linkam to take over Duneworld for two years with the promise that if they produce more melange, then they will receive the concession — otherwise it will go permanently to the Hoskanners. Much like in Dune, the Hoskanners sabotage and thwart to the best of their abilities, although the Linkams enlist the help of the Imperial Planetologist to devise a way to neutralize the sandworms and vastly increase the efficiency of operations.

The story has some obvious links to the original Dune novel, such as many of the same characters, but some key themes are underdeveloped in this version:

When we arranged all the chapters and read through the remarkable outline, we found that Spice Planet was a unique and worthy story in its own right, not just a precursor to Dune. Although the harsh desert is very similar to the one familiar to millions of fans, the tale itself is thematically different, focusing on decadence and drug addiction instead of ecology, finite resources, freedom, and religious fanaticism.

The authors note that if Herbert had written a novel like Spice Planet rather than Dune, it would have been about the length of most paperback novels and that publishing it might have been much easier.

=== Letters of Dune ===
This collection of letters details the trials and tribulations that Frank Herbert went through to have Dune published in Analog magazine and later by Chilton Books. The letters detail how he was encouraged to cut the length of the novel and to ease up on his descriptions of Paul Atreides's prescient powers.

=== "They Stopped the Moving Sands" ===
"They Stopped the Moving Sands" is an uncompleted article about how sand dunes were held in place by specially designed grasses. The article was never published, but was the impetus for Frank Herbert writing Dune.

=== Missing chapters from Dune and Dune Messiah ===
Also included in The Road to Dune are deleted chapters and alternate scenes from the first two novels in the Dune chronicles, Dune and Dune Messiah. These include alternate and extended scenes between Paul and Reverend Mother Mohiam, between Paul and Dr. Yueh, between Paul and Thufir Hawat, between Paul and his father Duke Leto Atreides, the passage to Arrakis on the Spacing Guild heighliner, the escape from Arrakeen and between Paul and a muad'dib mouse. The Dune Messiah scenes include a new chapter between Alia Atreides and Duncan Idaho, a new introduction and a discarded ending that features the death of the conspirators Edric, the Reverend Mother Mohiam and possibly Princess Irulan at the hands of a Fremen mob incensed by Paul Atreides' death.

=== Short stories ===
The Dune short stories "A Whisper on Caladan Seas", "Hunting Harkonnens", "Whipping Mek", and "The Faces of a Martyr" by Brian Herbert and Kevin J. Anderson are included in this collection. The story "Dune: Sea Child", originally published in Elemental, a 2006 benefit anthology for children who survived the 2004 Indian Ocean tsunami, is also included in the paperback edition of Road to Dune.
