= The Garbage Chronicles =

Novel by Brian Herbert and Kevin J. Anderson

The Garbage Chronicles - Being an Account of the Adventures of Tom Javik and Wizzy Malloy in the Faraway Land of Catapulted Garbage is a science fiction comedy novel written by Brian Herbert and Kevin J. Anderson, first published on January 1, 1985 by Berkley Books.

== Plot summary ==
In the consumer society of the future, in order to cope with economic problems, recycling and repairing is made illegal, and all damaged goods and garbage are launched into outer space. The protagonist gets a job of tracking criminals who collect garbage on another planet.

== History ==
The author wrote that a dramatic scene in the novel originated in a part of his then unpublished satirical science fiction short story "Earth Games" which was set in an alien world where earthling prisoners were forced to take part in mortal competitions in hotrod fighter cars called "Road Rage", "based on an ancient Earth highway ritual". "Earth Games" was published a year later in his collection Dangerous Worlds.

== Reception ==
Neil Gaiman reviewed The Garbage Chronicles for Imagine magazine, and stated that "one of the worst books I've read in years - it may have been meant to be funny, but I could well be wrong - and should be avoided as you would a rabid dog with a Cruise missile."

A reviewer noticed an insider joke: among the trash depicted on the book dust cover there is a catalog of the Andromeda Books, a sci-fi bookstore.
