= Dreamer of Dune =

2003 biography by Brian Herbert

Dreamer of Dune: The Biography of Frank Herbert
- Cover of the first edition
- Author: Brian Herbert
- Language: English
- Subject: Frank Herbert
- Publisher: Tor Books
- Publication date: 2003
- Publication place: United States
- Media type: Print (Hardcover & Paperback)
- Pages: 576
- ISBN: 0765306468

Dreamer of Dune: The Biography of Frank Herbert is a 2003 biography of the American science fiction author Frank Herbert written by his son Brian Herbert. It was a Hugo Award for Best Related Work finalist in 2004.
