= Spice World =

Spice World may refer to:

- Spiceworld (album), a 1997 album by the Spice Girls
- Spiceworld Tour, a 1998 concert tour by the Spice Girls
- Spice World – 2019 Tour, a 2019 concert tour by the Spice Girls
- Spice World (film), a 1997 British musical comedy film starring the Spice Girls
  - Spice World: The Official Book of the Movie, 1997 book
  - Spice World (video game), a video game based on the film
- SpiceWorld, the Spiceworks annual user conference

== See also ==
- Spice Planet, an alternate Dune story written by Brian Herbert and Kevin J. Anderson
