= The Trinity Paradox =

1991 novel by Kevin J. Anderson

The Trinity Paradox is a time travel novel by Kevin J. Anderson and Doug Beason, exploring the premise of an anti-nuclear activist from 1990s being transported back in time to the Manhattan Project, giving her the potential to sabotage the project in an attempt to prevent the development of nuclear weapons altogether.

Her attempt to do so, however, has far-reaching and unpredictable results, changing the outcome of the Second World War and the face of the post-war world.

== Reception ==
Donald Erbschloe in his review for Physics Today said that "the setting and the people of Los Alamos come alive", "the cast is impressive" and "the climax is thrilling and, as one might suspect, explosive". James P. Hogan noted that it "soberingly shows the perils of the sheep solemnly pledging themselves to vegetarianism while the wolves remain unconverted".
