= A Game of Authors =

Posthumous novel by Frank Herbert

- US first edition cover
- Author: Frank Herbert
- Language: English
- Genre: Thriller
- Publisher: WordFire Press
- Publication date: October 18, 2013
- Publication place: United States
- Media type: Print (Paperback & e-Book)
- Pages: 168
- ISBN: 1-614-75076-9

A Game of Authors is a thriller novel written by Frank Herbert between The Dragon in the Sea (1955) and Dune (1965), and published posthumously in 2013. The plot involves an American journalist who faces danger in Mexico.

== Plot summary ==
American journalist Hal Garson finds himself facing danger in Mexico as he picks up the mystery of legendary author Antone Luac, who had vanished in the country years before.
