= A Thorn in the Bush =

Posthumous novel by Frank Herbert

- US first edition cover
- Author: Frank Herbert
- Language: English
- Genre: Thriller
- Publisher: WordFire Press
- Publication date: November 12, 2014 (e-book); December 16, 2014 (paperback)
- Publication place: United States
- Media type: Print (E-book & Paperback)
- Pages: 144
- ISBN: 1-614-75283-4

A Thorn in the Bush is a thriller novel written by Frank Herbert and published posthumously in 2014.

== Plot summary ==
Expatriate American Mrs. Ross is living a quiet life in San Juan, Mexico when an ambitious American painter arrives, determined to know everything there is to know about the small village. Mrs. Ross, however, is determined to go to whatever lengths necessary to hide the secrets of her previous life.
