= Angels' Fall =

Posthumous novel by Frank Herbert

- US first edition cover
- Author: Frank Herbert
- Language: English
- Genre: Adventure fiction Thriller
- Publisher: WordFire Press
- Publication date: April 17, 2013 (e-book); April 30, 2013 (paperback)
- Publication place: United States
- Media type: Print (E-book & Paperback)
- Pages: 296
- ISBN: 1-614-75058-0

Angels' Fall is an adventure/thriller novel written by Frank Herbert in 1957 and published posthumously in 2013.

== Plot summary ==
After crashing in the Amazon rainforest, pilot Jeb Logan leads his small group of passengers on a desperate journey of survival.
