= Hellhole (novel) =

2011 novel by Kevin J. Anderson and Brian Herbert

- Cover of first edition hardcover.
- Authors: Brian Herbert; Kevin J. Anderson
- Cover artist: Stephen Youll
- Language: English
- Genre: Science fiction
- Publisher: Tor Books
- Publication date: March 15, 2011
- Publication place: United States
- Media type: Print (hardcover)
- Pages: 544
- ISBN: 978-0-7653-2269-2
- OCLC: 651912767
- Dewey Decimal: 813.54
- Followed by: Hellhole Awakening; Hellhole Inferno

Hellhole is the first book in the Hellhole science fiction trilogy by American authors Brian Herbert and Kevin J. Anderson.

== Plot summary ==
On the dangerous frontier planet Hellhole, defeated and exiled rebel Gen. Tiber Adolphus continues his honorable opposition to the political scheming and selfish machinations of the Crown Jewel worlds and grandmotherly Diadem Michella Duchenet. Adolphus and his companions work in secret to undermine the royal space travel monopoly and form a coalition of Deep Zone planets. Diadem Michella, embroiled in the schemes of the ancient noble families on the decadent capital planet Sonjeera, is too distracted to recognize the danger Adolphus poses.

=== The Constellation ===
The Crown Jewels are the twenty core planets in the Constellation. They are the most highly populated and considered to be the most civilized. These planets are ruled by nobles who constantly jockey for increased power. The Deep Zone is made up of the fifty-four frontier worlds of the Constellation recently opened for settlement. They are administered by government-appointed Governors and pay constantly increased tribute to the Crown Jewels.

== Characters ==
- General Tiber Adolphus: leader of a failed rebellion against the Constellation, now the exiled leader on planet Hallholme.
- Diadem Michella Duchenet: current leader of the Constellation.
- Ishop Heer: Diadem Michella's confidential aide, spy, and hatchet man.
- Sophie Vence: A powerful merchant on Hellhole, in a relationship with Gen. Adolphus.
- Keana Duchenet: Diadem Michella's only heir.
- Lord Louis de Carre: planetary ruler of Vielinger and lover of Keana.
- Christoph de Carre: Lord de Carre's only son and manager of the iperion mines on Vielinger.
- Fernando Neron: new Hellhole colonist
- Vincent Jenet: new Hellhole colonist, sentenced to exile there after being convicted of theft on Orsini.

== Reception ==
Publishers Weekly wrote that the "characters are one-dimensional, and the tale has an unsatisfying cliffhanger conclusion", while Booklist found the characters "easy for the reader to believe in, brought to life through not only their own emotions but also the responses and thoughts of the individuals around them ".

== Sequels ==
Herbert and Anderson have also published Hellhole Awakening (March 19, 2013) and Hellhole Inferno (August 12, 2014), which complete the trilogy.
