= The Godmakers (novel) =

1972 science fiction novel by Frank Herbert

The God Makers
- Author: Frank Herbert
- Cover artist: Vincent DiFate
- Language: English
- Genre: Science fiction
- Publisher: Putnam
- Publication date: 1972
- Publication place: United States
- Media type: Print (hardback & paperback)
- ISBN: 0-399-11006-2
- OCLC: 534343
- Dewey Decimal: 813/.5/4
- LC Class: PZ4.H5356 Go PS3558.E63

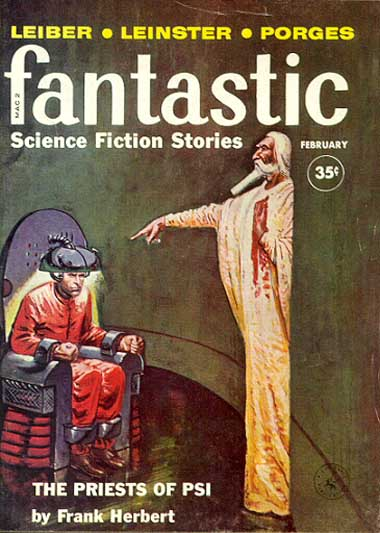
"The Priests of Psi" was the cover story for the February 1960 issue of Fantastic

The God Makers (1972) is a science fiction novel by Frank Herbert. Some later editions used a variant title, The Godmakers.

== Publication history ==
The novel The Godmakers expands upon a storyline appearing in four short stories over a decade earlier:

- "You Take the High Road". Appeared in Astounding Science Fiction, May 1958;
- "Missing link". Appeared in Astounding Science Fiction February 1959;
- "Operation Haystack". Appeared in Astounding Science Fiction, May 1959; and
- "The Priests of Psi". Appeared in Fantastic Science Fiction Stories, February 1960.

== Plot summary ==
The story focuses on Lewis Orne, an agent for a government agency which develops "lost planets". After correctly identifying a warlike civilization on the planet Hamal, he is drafted into Investigative Adjustment (I-A), which manages dangerous planets. Under the auspices of I-A, he travels to various planets in order to maintain peace throughout the galaxy. At the same time, the priests of the planet Amel, who practice "religious engineering", set about creating a god, something they have done numerous times before:

"We do not know from what creature or thing the god will be born", the Abbod said. "It could be one of you."

After resolving a number of dangerous situations, Lewis is injured and has a near-death experience. Following this, his psychic powers develop, and after passing a series of tests he becomes a god.

== Reception ==
Colin Greenland reviewed The Godmakers for Imagine magazine, and stated that "For all his ever-expanding cosmic perspective, Herbert still writes characters who look and sound as if they'd been cut off the backs of cornflake packets."
