= The White Plague =

1982 science fiction novel by Frank Herbert

- First edition cover
- Author: Frank Herbert
- Cover artist: Abe Echevarria
- Language: English
- Genre: Science fiction
- Publisher: G.P. Putnam's Sons
- Publication date: 1982
- Publication place: United States
- Media type: Print (Hardcover and Paperback)
- Pages: 445 pp
- ISBN: 978-0-399-12721-2
- OCLC: 8432222
- Dewey Decimal: 813/.54 19
- LC Class: PS3558.E63 W55 1982

The White Plague is a 1982 science fiction novel by American author Frank Herbert about an engineered disease which kills only women. It was nominated for a best science fiction novel Locus Award in 1983.

== Plot ==
On May 20, 1987, an IRA car bomb explodes, killing the wife and children of American molecular biologist John Roe O'Neill, who is visiting Dublin with his family. Driven halfway insane by his loss, his mind fragments into different personalities who carry out his plan for him. O'Neill plans a gendercidal revenge and creates a plague that kills only women, but for which men are the carriers. O'Neill then releases it in Ireland (for supporting the IRA), England (for their actions in Ireland and giving the IRA a cause), and Libya (for training said terrorists); he demands that the governments of the world send all citizens of those countries back to their countries, and that they quarantine those countries and let the plague run its course, so they will lose what he has lost; if they do not, he has more plagues to release.

After releasing the plague, O'Neill goes to Ireland to hide, planning to offer his services as a molecular biologist in the hopes of sabotaging whatever work is done there on finding a cure. When he arrives in Ireland, investigatory agencies suspect his true identity as the instigator of the plague. To travel to the lab at Killaloe, he is forced to walk with a priest, a boy who has taken a vow of silence due to the death of his mother, and Joseph Herity, the IRA bomber who detonated the explosive that killed O'Neill's wife and children; their purpose is to confirm his identity, either through Herity's indirect questioning, or the possibility that he will confess to the priest when confronted with the pain his revenge has caused for the boy.

Meanwhile, law and order have broken down in England and Ireland, and the old Irish ways are coming back. Local IRA thugs appoint themselves "kings of old", and others recreate ancient Celtic religions centered on the rowan tree. The IRA has effective control of Ireland, but as the governments of the world grow certain that O'Neill is there and essentially in custody, they consider wiping out the three targeted countries to end the lingering threat.

== Reception ==
Dave Langford reviewed The White Plague for White Dwarf #41, and stated that "There's plenty of edge-of-the-seat suspense and good thumping melodrama in the race to crack the gene-structure of the plague while a few women are still left alive."

The White Plague was nominated for a Locus Award for best science fiction novel in 1983, but lost to Isaac Asimov's novel Foundation's Edge.
