= Doug Beason =

American novelist

- Born: December 3, 1953 (age 72)
- Education: United States Air Force Academy
- Occupation: Novelist
- Writing career
- Genre: Science fiction

Doug Beason (born December 3, 1953) is an American scientist and science fiction author.

He graduated from the United States Air Force Academy in 1977 with a dual major in physics and math. He started his first novel while at the academy after returning there as an officer in the 1980s to teach physics. He is a retired Air Force Colonel with a PhD in physics. He is also a Fellow of the American Physical Society and has published two non-fiction books. His book "Science and Technology Policy for the post-Cold War: A Case for Long-Term Research", was awarded the National Defense University President's Strategic Vision award. He also worked on a few books, (e.g. Lifeline, The Trinity Paradox, and Nanospace) with Kevin J. Anderson. In 2008, he retired from his position as Associate Laboratory Director for Threat Reduction at the Los Alamos National Laboratory. He currently writes full-time, lectures, and consults.

== Bibliography ==
=== Novels ===
- Return to Honor (1989)
- Assault on Alpha Base (1990)
- Strike Eagle (1991)
- Wild Blue U (2005)
- Return to Honor (2014)
- The Cadet (2015)
- The Officer (2016)
- Space Station Down (2020), Co-Authored with Ben Bova

==== Co-authored with Kevin J. Anderson ====
- Lifeline (1990)
- The Trinity Paradox (1991)
- Assemblers of Infinity (1993)
- Ill Wind (1995)
- Ignition (1997)
- Kill Zone (2019)

Craig Kreident Series:

- Virtual Destruction (1996)
- Fallout (1997)
- Lethal Exposure (1998)

=== Short fiction ===
Title	Year	First published in	Reprinted in
"Lifeguard"	1987	New Destinies : volume 1 / Spring 1987, ed. Jim Baen (Baen, 1987)	Cities in Space, ed. Jerry Pournelle and Jim F. Carr (Ace, 1991)
"Reflections in a Magnetic Mirror" / with Kevin J. Anderson	1988	Full Spectrum, ed. Lou Aronica and Shawna McCarthy (Bantam Spectra, 1988)	Dogged Persistence / Kevin J. Anderson (Golden Gryphon Press, 2001)
"Rescue at L-5" / with Kevin J. Anderson	1990	Project Solar Sail, ed. Arthur C. Clarke and David Brin (Roc/Penguin, 1990)	
"Defense Conversion"	1995	How to Save the World, ed. Charles Sheffield (Tor, 1995) hb	How to Save the World, ed. Charles Sheffield (Tor, 1999) pb
"Homecoming"	1995	Full Spectrum 5, ed. Jennifer Hershey, Tom Dupree and Janna Silverstein (Bantam Spectra, 1995)	

=== Non-fiction ===
- Science and Technology Policy for the post-Cold War: A Case for Long-Term Research
- The E-Bomb: How America's new directed energy weapons will change the way future wars will be fought (2005)
