= Assemblers of Infinity =

1993 novel by Kevin J. Anderson

- Author: Kevin J. Anderson; Doug Beason
- Illustrator: Randy Asplund-Faith (Analog)
- Cover artist: Pamela Lee
- Language: English
- Genre: Science fiction
- Publisher: Analog, Bantam Spectra
- Publication date: 1993
- Publication place: United States
- Media type: Print (Softcover, Hardcover), eBook
- Pages: 335
- Awards: Nebula Award 1994 (Nomination); Locus Award 1994 (25th)
- ISBN: 978-0-553-29921-2
- OCLC: 27344950

Assemblers of Infinity is a science-fiction novel by American writers Kevin J. Anderson and Doug Beason. It first appeared in print in serialized form in the American magazine Analog Science Fiction and Fact from September to December 1992 and was published in 1993 by Bantam Spectra. In 1994 it was nominated for the Nebula Award for best science fiction novel: this was the only Nebula nomination that both Anderson and Beason ever had. It was also placed 25th SF Novel in the 1994 Locus Award. The book is currently out of print, but is still available as e-book.
