= Man of Two Worlds (novel) =

1986 science fiction novel by Brian and Frank Herbert

- Author: Brian and Frank Herbert
- Cover artist: John Schoenherr
- Language: English
- Genre: Science fiction
- Publisher: Putnam
- Publication date: 1986
- Publication place: United States
- Media type: Print (Hardcover and Paperback)
- Pages: 429
- ISBN: 0-399-13132-9
- OCLC: 12942431
- Dewey Decimal: 813/.54 19
- LC Class: PS3558.E63 M3 1986

Man of Two Worlds (1986) is a science fiction novel by American writers Brian and Frank Herbert.

== Plot summary ==
On the distant planet Dreenor lives the most powerful species in the Galaxy. All of the Universe is the creation of the Dreens, who possess the power of "idmaging", turning their thoughts into reality. They can create whole worlds, of which the wild, ungovernable planet Earth is one. But suddenly Earth is a threat, its people on the verge of discovering interstellar travel, and with it, of gaining access to Dreenor itself—a paradox within a paradox, not to be permitted. While the elder Dreens plan Earth's destruction, a youngster, Ryll, embarks on an unauthorized jaunt across space. Forced for survival to merge bodies with an "Earther" whose mind is as strong as his own, he has to battle for control. And the future of all earthly life lies in the hand of a composite being, half wily, aggressive human, half naive adolescent alien, confused and far from home.

== Reception ==
Dave Langford reviewed Man of Two Worlds for White Dwarf #80, and stated that "The combination of tension and daftness (eg, Dreens are helpless against the mind-rotting Earthly herb, basil) makes for an odd read."

Kirkus Reviews highly commended the novel stating that it is "a novel of great charm and freshness, with improbable situations, weird complications, vital characters, a wobbly plot and plenty of loose ends."

== Reviews ==
- Review by Peter A. Brigg (1986) in Fantasy Review, June 1986
- Review by Ken Lake (1986) in Vector 133
- Review by Brian Stableford (1986) in Foundation, #37 Autumn 1986
- Review [French] by Thierry Bosch (1987) in Fiction, #392
- Review by Helen McNabb (1988) in Paperback Inferno, #70
- Review [French] by Jonathan Dornet (1988) in A&A, #113-114
- Review by Ken Brown (1988) in Interzone, #23 Spring 1988
- Review [German] by Brian Stableford (1990) in Das Science Fiction Jahr Ausgabe 1990
