= Soul Catcher (novel) =

1972 science fiction novel by Frank Herbert

- First edition cover
- Author: Frank Herbert
- Language: English
- Published: May 9, 1972
- Publisher: G. P. Putnam's Sons
- Publication place: United States
- Media type: Print (Hardcover & paperback)
- Pages: 250
- ISBN: 0-425-04250-2
- OCLC: 5434182

Soul Catcher is a 1972 novel by Frank Herbert about a Native American who kidnaps a young white boy, and their journey together.

In 2014 producer Dimitri Villard acquired the film rights to the novel.

== Plot ==
After his young sister is brutally raped by white loggers, Native American student Charles Hobuhet abducts the 13-year-old son of a high-level US politician. As Katsuk, "the avenger", Charles plans to use young David as a sacrifice in an ancient ritual of vengeance. A complicated bond begins to form as they journey across the Pacific Northwest, pursued by hunters.

== Critical reception ==
Kirkus Reviews writes that the bond between Katsuk and David "sounds almost plausible, but the novel's serious fantasy fiction — the characters are symbols and Katsuk's tranced sense of mission will remind some of Dune's Paul Atreides. At times excessively lyrical and portentous; nonetheless, deeply felt and magical, and an eloquent evocation of the old earth-life religion contrasted to the walking death of whites."

The novel was partially inspired by Herbert's relationship with Quileute Howard Hansen, who disapproved of the book's ending, saying it was culturally contrary to how a Native American would behave in that context. Film producer Dimitri Villard noted in 2014 that the novel's "not cinematically acceptable" ending was likely one of the reasons the novel had never been adapted into a film.

== Film adaptation ==
In August 2014, producer Dimitri Villard acquired the film rights to the novel. He said:

The book is an extraordinary example of Frank Herbert's brilliant writing, and it is something I've always wanted to turn into a film. I remember the rights being unavailable when I first pursued the Soul Catcher project in the '80s, but as my producing career developed I never forgot the powerful effect the story had on me. Now, with full support from the Frank Herbert estate, we have the opportunity to make a culturally impactful film that combines elements of suspense, high drama, mysticism and Native American history that will resonate for years to come and appeal to the millions of Frank Herbert fans worldwide.

Villard later hired Quileute elder Howard Hansen, a friend of Herbert's, as a consultant to help rework the ending (Hansen died in 2018). He also enlisted casting director Rene Haynes, known for her work with Native American performers.

Film adaptation now in pre-production with Chris Eyre (Smoke Signals, Dark Wind) helming (October 2026). https://www.imdb.com/title/tt3978046/
