= Brian Herbert =

American author (born 1947)

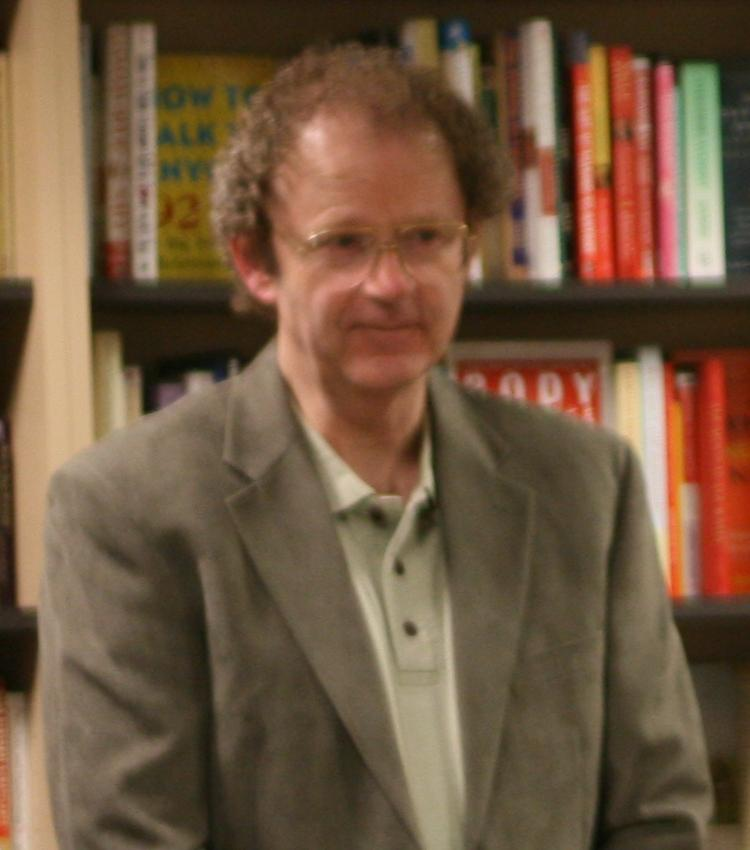
- Herbert in 2008
- Born: Brian Patrick Herbert; June 29, 1947 (age 79); Seattle, Washington, U.S.
- Spouse: Jan Herbert (m. 1967)
- Children: 3
- Father: Frank Herbert
- Writing career
- Genre: Science fiction
- Notable work: Dune series
- Website: www.brianherbertnovels.com

Brian Patrick Herbert (born June 29, 1947) is an American author, known for his work on the Dune franchise, which was created by his father, Frank Herbert.

Brian Herbert's novels include Sidney's Comet, Prisoners of Arionn, Man of Two Worlds (written with his father), and Sudanna Sudanna. In 2003, Herbert wrote a biography of his father titled Dreamer of Dune: The Biography of Frank Herbert. The younger Herbert has edited the Songs of Muad'dib and the Notebooks of Frank Herbert's Dune. Herbert created a concordance for the Dune universe based on his father's notes, though, according to the younger Herbert, there are no immediate plans to publish it. He has written several comic books with Kevin J. Anderson based on Dune novels and short stories.

== Career ==
Herbert is known for his collaborations with author Kevin J. Anderson, with whom he has written multiple prequels (and some sequels) to his father's landmark 1965 science fiction novel, Dune, all of which have made The New York Times Best Seller list. The duo began with the prequel trilogies Prelude to Dune (1999–2001) and Legends of Dune (2002–2004). Herbert and Anderson next published Hunters of Dune (2006) and Sandworms of Dune (2007), two sequels to Frank Herbert's original Dune series, which was left incomplete at the end of Frank's sixth Dune novel, Chapterhouse: Dune. These novels are based on an outline and notes left behind by Frank Herbert after his 1986 death for what he referred to as Dune 7, his own planned seventh novel in the series.

In 2008, Herbert and Anderson began publishing Heroes of Dune (2008–2023), a series of four novels which take place between the first five novels of Frank Herbert's six original Dune series, but only two were published initially. The others were set aside, first for the Great Schools of Dune trilogy (2012–2016), and later for the Caladan trilogy (2020–2022). However, in 2023, Herbert resumed the Heroes of Dune series by publishing Princess of Dune (2023). Herbert and Anderson have also written numerous Dune short stories (2001–2017).

== Works ==
=== Individual ===
- Classic Comebacks (1981)
- Incredible Insurance Claims (1982)
- Sidney's Comet (1983)
- The Garbage Chronicles (1985)
- Man of Two Worlds (1986) (with Frank Herbert)
- Sudanna, Sudanna (1986)
- Prisoners of Arionn (1987)
- The Race for God (1990)
- Memorymakers (1991) (with Marie Landis)
- Blood on the Sun (1996) (with Marie Landis)
- The Little Green Book of Chairman Rahma (2014)

==== Timeweb series ====
- Timeweb (2006)
- The Web and the Stars (2007)
- Webdancers (2008)

=== Non-fiction ===
- Dreamer of Dune: The Biography of Frank Herbert (2003)
- The Forgotten Heroes: The Heroic Story of the United States Merchant Marine (2004) ISBN 0-7653-0706-5

=== Dune books ===
(all with Kevin J. Anderson)

==== Prelude to Dune trilogy ====
- Dune: House Atreides (1999)
- Dune: House Harkonnen (2000)
- Dune: House Corrino (2001)

==== Legends of Dune ====
- Dune: The Butlerian Jihad (2002)
- Dune: The Machine Crusade (2003)
- Dune: The Battle of Corrin (2004)

==== Collection ====
- The Road to Dune (2005) (also with Frank Herbert)
- Sands of Dune (2022)

==== Dune 7 ====
- Hunters of Dune (2006)
- Sandworms of Dune (2007)

==== Heroes of Dune ====
- Paul of Dune (2008)
- The Winds of Dune (2009)
- Princess of Dune (2023, originally titled Irulan of Dune and planned for a 2011 release)
- Leto of Dune (postponed indefinitely; title may be changed to Golden Path of Dune)

==== Great Schools of Dune ====
- Sisterhood of Dune (2012)
- Mentats of Dune (2014)
- Navigators of Dune (2016)

==== The Caladan Trilogy ====
- Dune: The Duke of Caladan (2020)
- Dune: The Lady of Caladan (2021)
- Dune: The Heir of Caladan (2022)

==== Dune short stories ====
- "Dune: A Whisper of Caladan Seas"
- "Dune: Hunting Harkonnens"
- "Dune: Whipping Mek"
- "Dune: The Faces of a Martyr"
- "Dune: Sea Child"
- "Dune: Treasure in the Sand"
- "Dune: Wedding Silk"
- "Dune: Red Plague"
- "Dune: The Waters of Kanly"
- "Dune: Blood of the Sardaukar"

=== Hellhole series ===
with Kevin J. Anderson

- Hellhole (2011)
- Hellhole Awakening (2013)
- Hellhole Inferno (2014)
