= Kevin J. Anderson =

American science fiction author (born 1962)

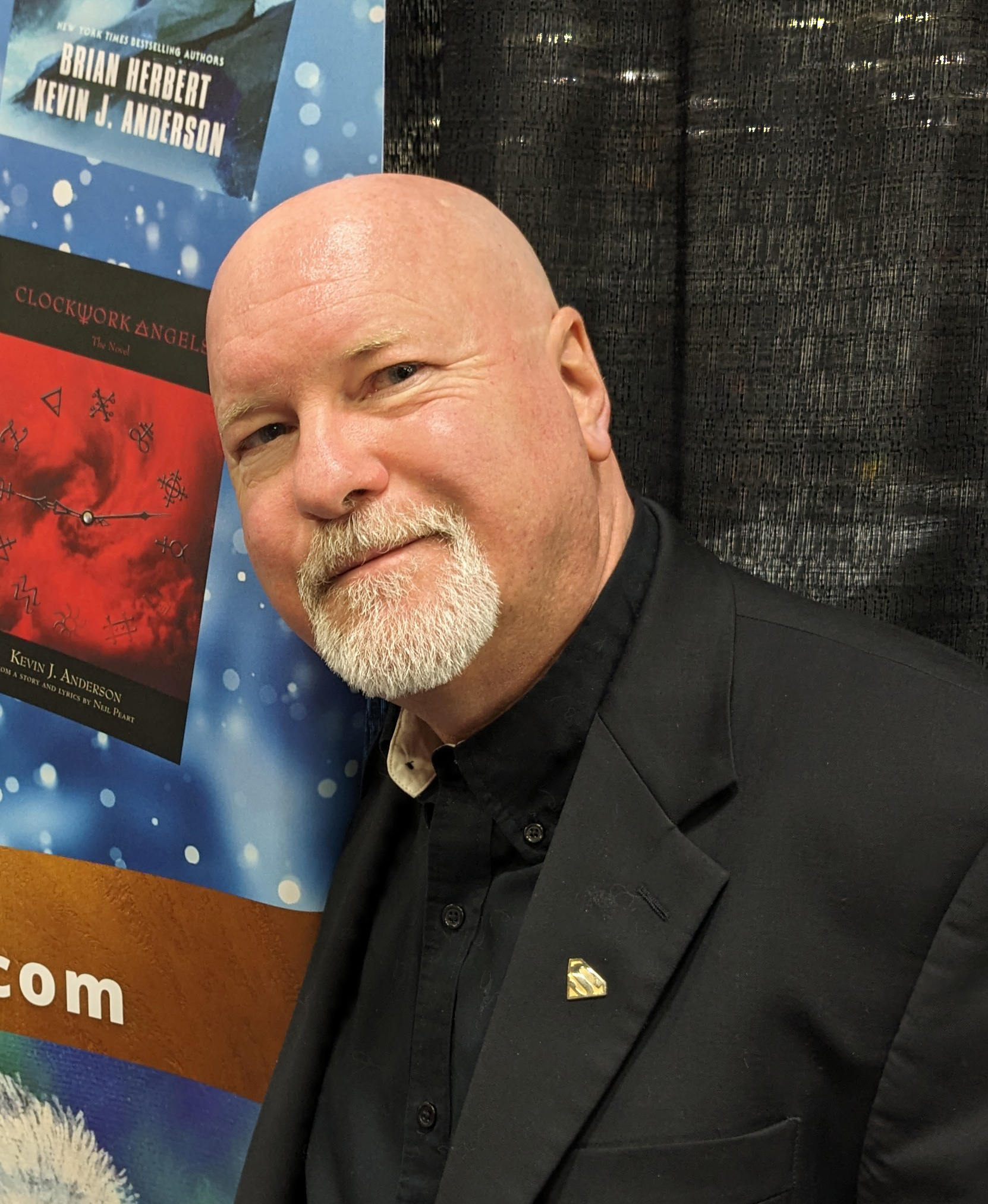
- Anderson in June 2023 at Origins Game Fair
- Born: March 27, 1962 (age 64); Racine, Wisconsin, U.S.
- Occupation: Author
- Spouse: Rebecca Moesta (m. 1991)
- Writing career
- Pen name: Gabriel Mesta, K.J. Anderson
- Language: English
- Genres: Science fiction, fantasy, horror
- Website: wordfire.com

Kevin James Anderson (born March 27, 1962) is an American science fiction author. He has written spin-off novels for Star Wars, StarCraft, Titan A.E. and The X-Files, and with Brian Herbert is the co-author of the Dune prequel series. His original works include the Saga of Seven Suns series and the Nebula Award–nominated Assemblers of Infinity. He has also written several comic books, including the Dark Horse Star Wars series Tales of the Jedi written in collaboration with Tom Veitch, Dark Horse Predator titles, and The X-Files titles for Topps. Some of Anderson's superhero novels include Enemies & Allies, about the first meeting of Batman and Superman, and The Last Days of Krypton, telling the story of how Superman's planet Krypton came to be destroyed.

Anderson has published over 140 books, over 50 of which have been on US and international bestseller lists, and he has more than 23 million books in print worldwide.

Anderson is working as a professor at Western Colorado University. Anderson has been a Literary Guest of Honor and Keynote Speaker at the Life, the Universe, & Everything professional science fiction and fantasy arts symposium, on at least three occasions: 2016, 2006 and 1993. In 2021, Anderson was inducted into the Colorado Authors Hall of Fame along with Stephen King and James Michener. He has twice won the Scribe Award and in 2012 was elected Grandmaster of the International Association of Media Tie-In Writers.

== Early and personal life ==
Kevin J. Anderson was born March 27, 1962, in Racine, Wisconsin, and grew up in Oregon, Wisconsin. According to Anderson, The War of the Worlds greatly influenced him. At the age of eight, he wrote his first story, titled "Injection". At ten, he bought a typewriter and has written ever since. In his freshman year in high school, he submitted his first short story to a magazine, but it took two more years before one of his manuscripts was accepted. When it was accepted, they paid him in copies of the magazine. In his senior year, he sold his first story for money for $12.50.

Anderson received a B.S. degree in Physics/Astronomy with honors from the University of Wisconsin–Madison in 1981. In 2017, he also received an MFA with an emphasis in Fiction from Lindenwood University.

For 12 years Anderson worked at the Lawrence Livermore National Laboratory, where he met fellow writers Rebecca Moesta and Doug Beason. Anderson later married Moesta and frequently coauthors novels with both her and Beason.

== Career ==
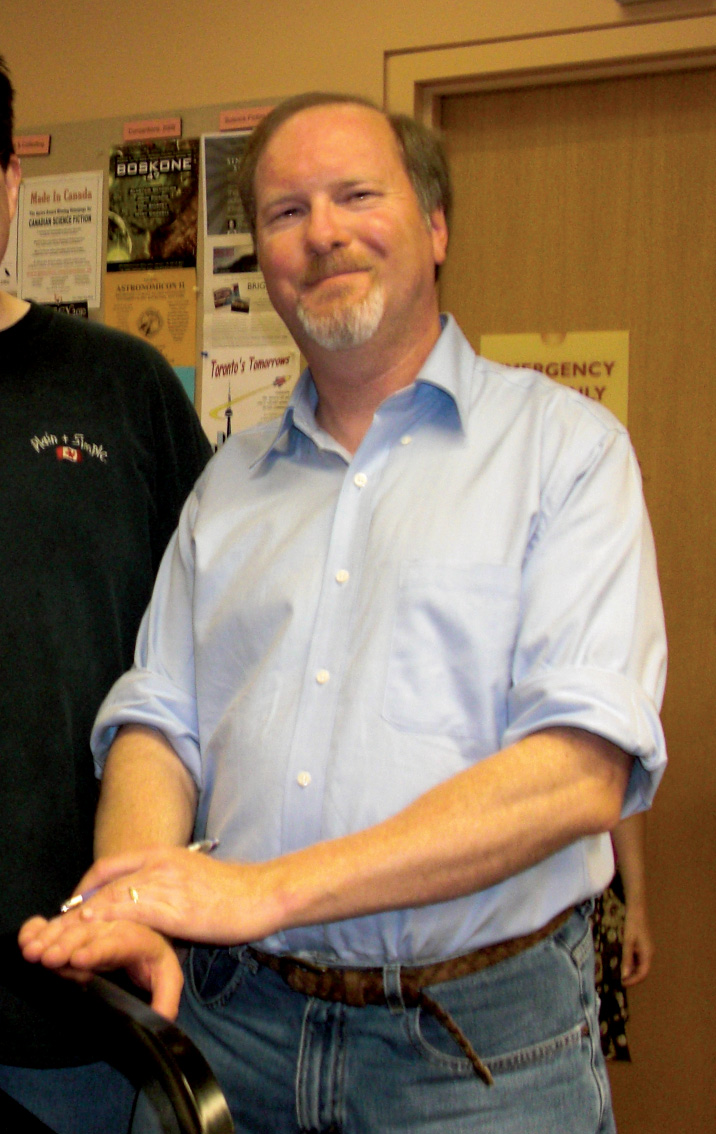
Anderson at Toronto book signing, August 2009

Anderson's first novel, Resurrection, Inc., was published in 1988 and nominated for a Bram Stoker Award for Best First Novel. His 1993 collaboration with Beason, Assemblers of Infinity, was nominated for both a Nebula and Locus Award. Anderson wrote The X-Files novels Ground Zero (1995), Ruins (1996) and Antibodies (1997). Ground Zero reached #1 on the London Sunday Times Best Seller List and Ruins made the New York Times Best Seller list. Contracted to write novels in the Star Wars expanded universe, Anderson published the Jedi Academy trilogy in 1994, followed by the 1996 novel Darksaber. He and Moesta also wrote the 14-volume Young Jedi Knights series from 1995 to 1998. As a noted Star Wars novelist, Anderson was a participant in the FidoNet Star Wars Echo, a 1990s bulletin board system forum cited as one of the earliest influential forms of Star Wars on-line fandom.

In 1997, Anderson and Brian Herbert signed a $3 million deal with Bantam Books to coauthor a prequel trilogy to the 1965 novel Dune and its five sequels (1969–1985) by Herbert's deceased father, Frank Herbert. Starting with 1999's Dune: House Atreides, the ongoing Dune prequel series has expanded to ten novels to date. In 2011 Publishers Weekly called the series "a sprawling edifice that Frank Herbert's son and Anderson have built on the foundation of the original Dune novels." Anderson and Brian Herbert have also published Hunters of Dune (2006) and Sandworms of Dune (2007), sequels to Frank Herbert's final novel Chapterhouse: Dune (1985) which complete the chronological progression of his original series and wrap up storylines that began with his Heretics of Dune (1984). Between 2011 and 2014, Anderson and Herbert also released their Hellhole trilogy of novels unrelated to Dune.

In 2002, Anderson released the steampunk/adventure novel Captain Nemo: The Fantastic History of a Dark Genius and was subsequently asked to write The League of Extraordinary Gentlemen (2003), a novelization of the film of the same name. The following year he also wrote the novelization for the 2004 film Sky Captain and the World of Tomorrow. In 2005, Anderson co-wrote, along with Dean Koontz, the first book in the Frankenstein series called Frankenstein, Prodigal Son.

Between 2002 and 2008, Anderson published a seven-novel original space opera series called The Saga of Seven Suns. In 2014 he began publishing a sequel trilogy called The Saga of Shadows. Anderson published four novels and two short stories in his Dan Shamble, Zombie P.I. series between 2012 and 2014. In 2012, Anderson coauthored a novelization of Clockwork Angels, an album by the Canadian rock band Rush, with Rush's drummer, Neil Peart. Anderson and Peart reunited in 2015 for a sequel, Clockwork Lives. The original novelisation would win a Scribe Award for Best Adapted Novel

=== WordFire Press ===
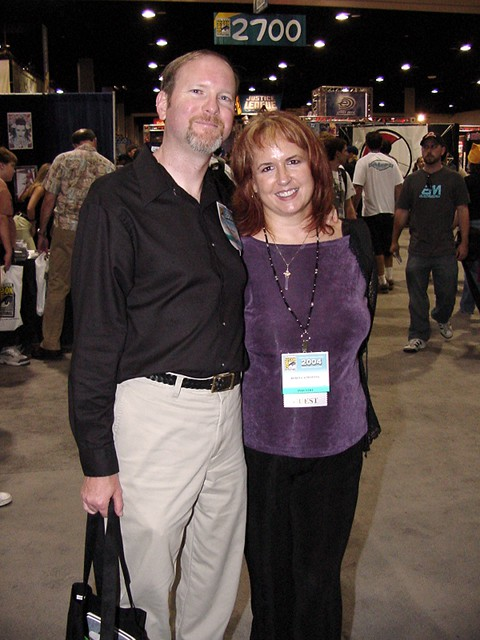
Anderson with his wife Rebecca Moesta in 2004 at Comic Con

In 2011, Anderson and Moesta founded their own publishing imprint, WordFire Press, to reissue some of their out-of-print books in paperback and/or e-book formats. They have subsequently published and reprinted works in various genres, including several out-of-print or previously unpublished novels by Frank Herbert.

In 2013, WordFire acquired the reprint rights to the works of Allen Drury, including his 1959 Pulitzer Prize-winning political novel Advise and Consent. That novel, out of print for nearly 15 years, ranked #27 on the 2013 BookFinder.com list of the Top 100 Most Searched for Out of Print Books before WordFire reissued it in February 2014. The company also reprinted Advise and Consent's five sequels — A Shade of Difference (1962), Capable of Honor (1966), Preserve and Protect (1968), Come Nineveh, Come Tyre (1973), and The Promise of Joy (1975) — as well as Drury's later novels Mark Coffin, U.S.S. (1979) and Decision (1983).

WordFire released four previously unpublished novels by Frank Herbert, who died in 1986: High-Opp (2012), Angels' Fall (2013), A Game of Authors (2013), and A Thorn in the Bush (2014). Anderson announced these in his blog. WordFire also reissued several of Herbert's unavailable titles: Destination: Void (1966), The Heaven Makers (1968), Soul Catcher (1972), The Godmakers (1972), and Direct Descent (1980) — as well as Man of Two Worlds (1986), an out-of-print novel cowritten by Herbert and his son Brian. WordFire also possesses non-US/Canadian e-book rights to some of Anderson's own collaborations with Brian Herbert, the Prelude to Dune trilogy (1999–2001), as well as Anderson's Dan Shamble, Zombie P.I. series of novels.

== Awards, records and nominations ==
- Resurrection, Inc. (1988): Nominated for Bram Stoker Award for Best First Novel
- Assemblers of Infinity with Doug Beason (1993): Nebula and Locus Award nominee
- Blindfold (1995): Preliminary Nebula Award nominee (1996)
- Ground Zero (1995): No. 1 on The Sunday Times best seller list and voted "Best Science Fiction Novel of 1995" by readers of SFX
- Ruins (1996): New York Times Best Seller list (first The X-Files novel to make the list) and voted the "Best Science Fiction Novel of 1996"
- Young Jedi Knights series (1995–98): New York Times Best Sellers, winner of 1999 Golden Duck Award (middle grades) for excellence in science fiction
- Guinness World Record for "Largest Single Author Signing" (previously set by General Colin Powell and Howard Stern)
- The Dark Between the Stars (2014): Nominated for a Hugo Award for Best Novel.

== Works ==
Anderson has published over 120 books, over 50 of which have been on US and international bestseller lists, and he has more than 23 million books in print worldwide.
