= Frank Herbert =

American science-fiction author (1920–1986)

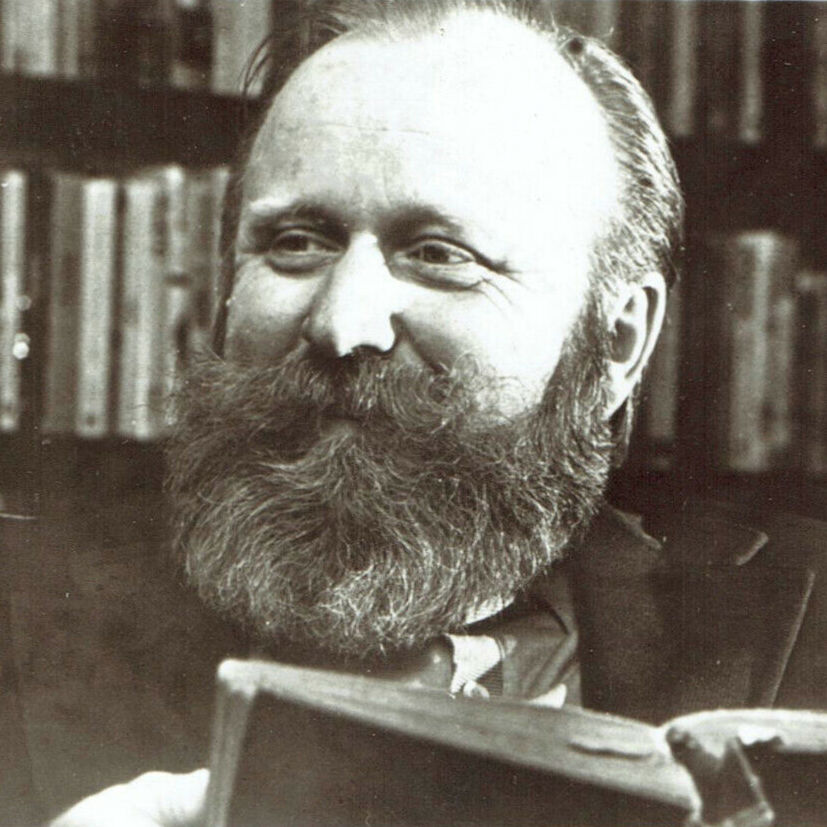
- Herbert in 1984
- Born: Franklin Patrick Herbert Jr; October 8, 1920; Tacoma, Washington, U.S.
- Died: February 11, 1986 (aged 65); Madison, Wisconsin, U.S.
- Occupations: Novelist; story-story writer
- Spouses: Flora Lillian Parkinson (m. 1941; div. 1943) Beverly Ann Stuart (m. 1946; died 1984) Theresa Diane Shackelford (m. 1985)
- Children: 3, including Brian
- Writing career
- Period: 1945–1986
- Genre: Science fiction
- Works: Full list
- Notable awards: Hugo Award (1966); Nebula Award (1966)

Signature
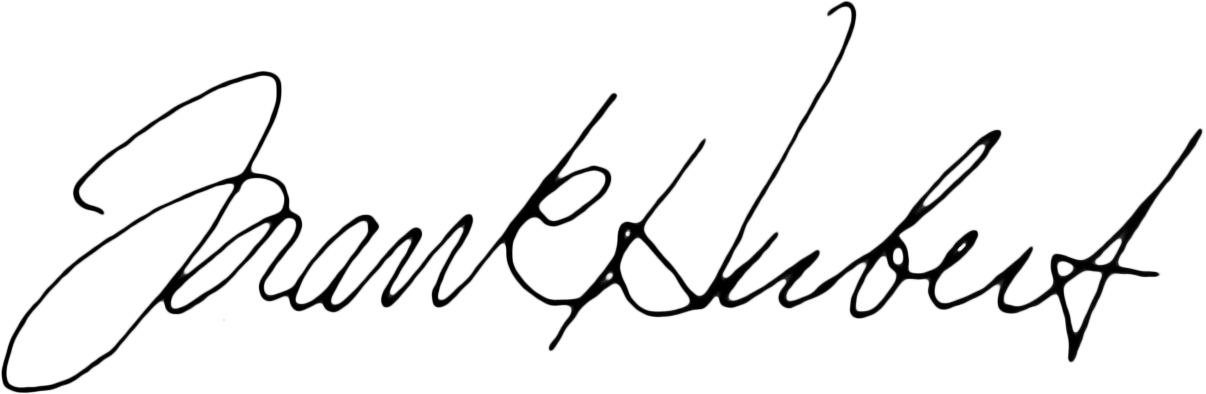

Franklin Patrick Herbert Jr. (October 8, 1920 – February 11, 1986) was an American science-fiction author, best known for his 1965 novel Dune and its five sequels. He also wrote short stories and worked as a newspaper journalist, photographer, book reviewer, ecological consultant, and lecturer.

Dune is one of the best-selling science fiction novels of all time, and the series is a classic of the science-fiction genre. The series has been adapted numerous times, including the film Dune (1984) by David Lynch, the miniseries Frank Herbert's Dune (2000) and Frank Herbert's Children of Dune (2003) by John Harrison, and a film trilogy by Denis Villeneuve currently in production, with Dune (2021) and Dune: Part Two (2024) having been released with Dune: Part Three (2026) being the last installment.

== Biography ==
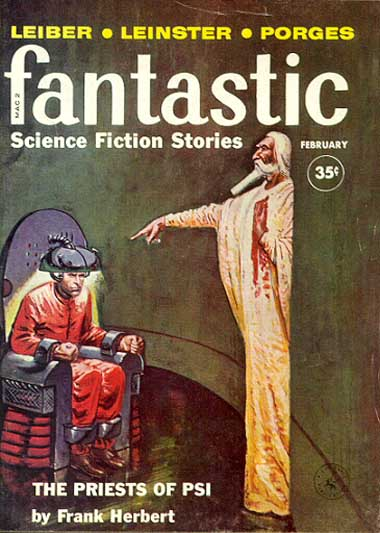
Herbert's novella The Priests of Psi was the cover story for the February 1960 issue of Fantastic.

=== Early life ===
Franklin Patrick Herbert Jr. was born on October 8, 1920, in Tacoma, Washington, to Franklin Patrick Herbert Sr. and Eileen (née McCarthy) Herbert. His paternal grandparents had come west in 1905 to join Burley Colony in Kitsap County, one of many utopian communes springing up in Washington State beginning in the 1890s. His upbringing included spending a lot of time on the rural Olympic and Kitsap Peninsulas. He was fascinated by books, could read much of the newspaper before the age of five, had an excellent memory, and learned quickly. He had an early interest in photography, buying a Kodak box camera at age ten, a new folding camera in his early teens, and a color film camera in the mid-1930s. Due to his parents' drinking, he ran away from home with his little sister, 5-year-old Patricia Lou, in 1938 to live with Frank's favorite maternal aunt, Peggy "Violet" Rowntree, and her husband, Ken Rowntree Sr. Within weeks, Patricia moved back home. But Frank, 18, remained with his aunt and uncle.

=== Education ===
He enrolled in high school at Salem High School (now North Salem High School), where he graduated the next year. In 1939, his parents and sister had moved to Los Angeles, California, so Frank followed them. He lied about his age to get his first newspaper job at the Glendale Star. Herbert then returned to Salem in 1940 where he worked for the Oregon Statesman newspaper (now Statesman Journal) in a variety of positions, including photographer.

Herbert married Flora Lillian Parkinson in San Pedro, California, in 1941. They had one daughter, Penelope (b. February 16, 1942), and divorced in 1943. During 1942, after the U.S. entry into World War II, he served in the U.S. Navy's Seabees for six months as a photographer, but suffered a head injury and was given a medical discharge. Herbert subsequently moved to Portland, Oregon where he reported for The Oregon Journal.

After the war, Herbert attended the University of Washington, where he met Beverly Ann Stuart at a creative writing class in 1946. They were the only students who had sold any work for publication; Herbert had sold two pulp adventure stories to magazines, the first to Esquire in 1945 titled "Survival of the Cunning", and Stuart had sold a story to Modern Romance magazine. They married in Seattle in 1946, and had two sons, Brian (b. 1947) and Bruce Calvin Herbert who died from AIDS-related pneumonia (1951–1993). In 1949 Herbert and his wife moved to California to work on the Santa Rosa Press-Democrat. Here they befriended the psychologists Ralph and Irene Slattery. The Slatterys introduced Herbert to the work of several thinkers who would influence his writing, including Freud, Jung, Jaspers, and Heidegger; they also familiarized Herbert with Zen Buddhism.

Herbert never graduated from college. According to his son Brian, he wanted to study only what interested him and so did not complete the required curriculum. He returned to journalism and worked at the Seattle Star and the Oregon Statesman. He was a writer and editor for the San Francisco Examiner's California Living magazine for a decade.

=== Early career ===
In a 1973 interview, Herbert stated that he had been reading science fiction for "about ten years" before he began writing in the genre, and he listed his favorite authors as H. G. Wells, Robert A. Heinlein, Poul Anderson and Jack Vance.

Herbert's first science fiction story, "Looking for Something", was published in the April 1952 issue of Startling Stories, then a monthly edited by Samuel Mines. Three more of his stories appeared in 1954 issues of Astounding Science Fiction and Amazing Stories. His career as a novelist began in 1955 with the serial publication of Under Pressure in Astounding from November 1955; afterward it was issued as a book by Doubleday titled The Dragon in the Sea. The story explored sanity and madness in the environment of a 21st-century submarine and predicted worldwide conflicts over oil consumption and production. It was a critical success but not a major commercial one. During this time Herbert also worked as a speechwriter for Republican senator Guy Cordon.

=== Dune ===
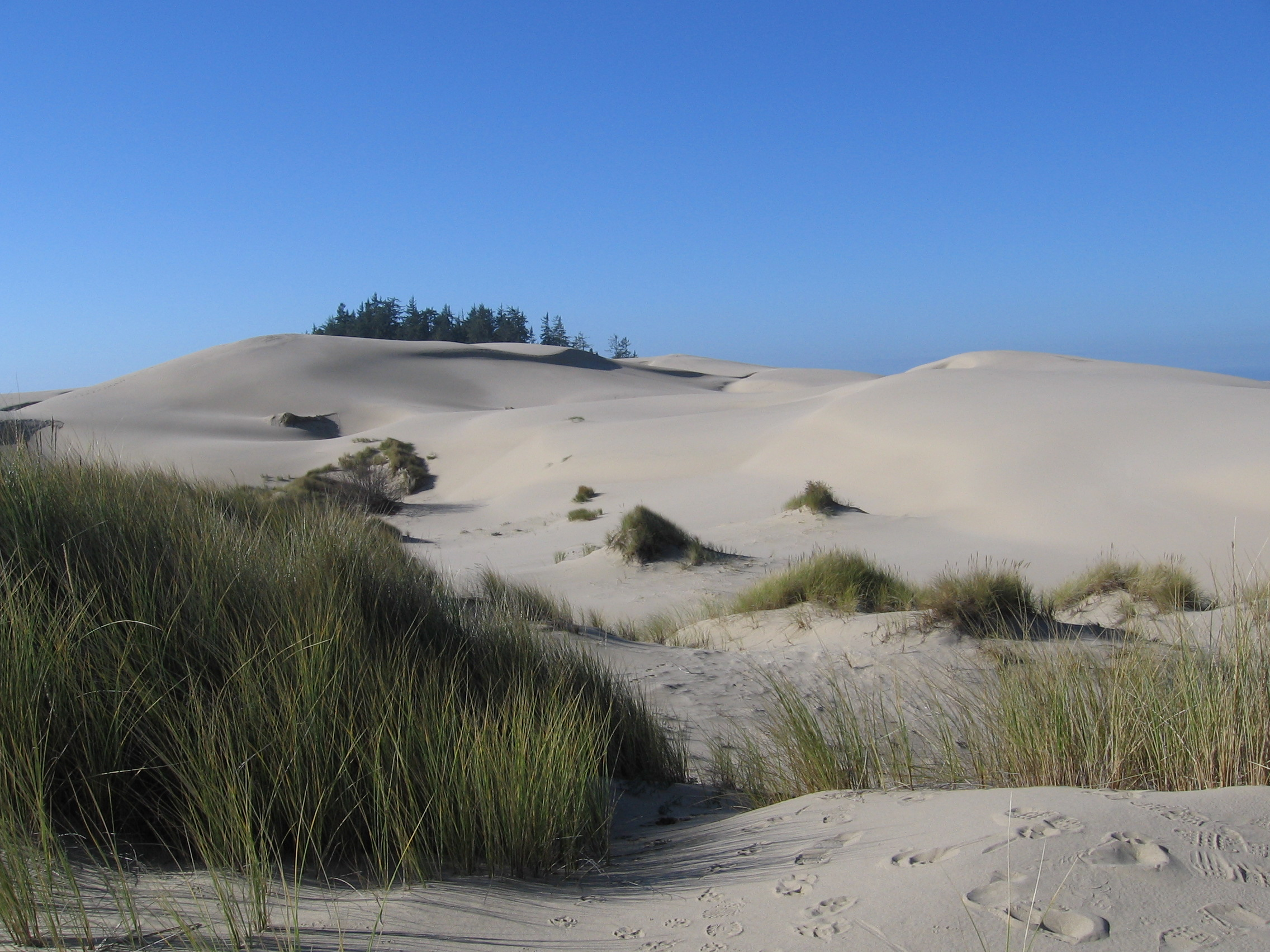
The Oregon Dunes near Florence, Oregon, served as an inspiration for the Dune saga.

Herbert began researching Dune in 1959. He was able to devote himself wholeheartedly to his writing career because his wife returned to work full-time as an advertising writer for department stores, becoming their breadwinner during the 1960s. The novel Dune was published in 1965, which spearheaded the Dune franchise. He later told Willis E. McNelly that the novel originated when he was assigned to write a magazine article about sand dunes in the Oregon Dunes near Florence, Oregon. He got overinvolved and ended up with far more raw material than needed for an article; while the article was never written, it planted in Herbert the seed that would become Dune.

Dune took six years of research and writing to complete, and was much longer than other commercial science fiction of the time. Herbert's environmental work in Oregon formed the basis of the speculative ecological work of the Fremen, which parallels real-world efforts and tactics of sand dune management.

Analog (formerly Astounding, but still edited by John W. Campbell) published it in two parts comprising eight installments, "Dune World" from December 1963 and "Prophet of Dune" in 1965. It was then rejected by nearly twenty book publishers. One editor prophetically wrote, "I might be making the mistake of the decade, but..."

Sterling E. Lanier, an editor of Chilton Book Company (known mainly for its auto-repair manuals), had read the Dune serials and offered a $7,500 advance plus future royalties for the rights to publish them as a hardcover book. Herbert rewrote much of his text.

Dune was soon a critical success. It won the Nebula Award for Best Novel in 1965 and shared the Hugo Award in 1966 with ...And Call Me Conrad by Roger Zelazny.

Dune was not an immediate bestseller, but Herbert had still received $20,000 from Dune's publication by 1968, which was much more than most science fiction novels of the era. Although he could not yet take up a full-time career as a writer, Dune's success opened other doors for him. He was the Seattle Post-Intelligencer's education writer from 1969 to 1972 and lecturer in general studies and interdisciplinary studies at the University of Washington (1970–1972). He then worked in Vietnam and Pakistan as a social and ecological consultant in 1972, and in 1973 he was director-photographer of the television show The Tillers.

I don't worry about inspiration or anything like that.... later, coming back and reading what I have produced, I am unable to detect the difference between what came easily and when I had to sit down and say, "Well, now it's writing time and now I'll write."

— Frank Herbert

By the end of 1972, Herbert had retired from newspaper writing and became a full-time fiction writer. During the 1970s and 1980s, he enjoyed considerable commercial success as an author. He divided his time between homes in Hawaii and Washington's Olympic Peninsula; his home in Port Townsend on the peninsula was intended to be an "ecological demonstration project". During this time he wrote numerous books and pushed ecological and philosophical ideas. He continued his Dune saga with Dune Messiah (1969), Children of Dune (1976), God Emperor of Dune (1981), Heretics of Dune (1984) and Chapterhouse: Dune (1985). Herbert planned to write a seventh novel to conclude the series, but his death in 1986 left storylines unresolved.

Other works by Herbert include The Godmakers (1972), The Dosadi Experiment (1977), The White Plague (1982) and the books he wrote in partnership with Bill Ransom: The Jesus Incident (1979), The Lazarus Effect (1983) and The Ascension Factor (1988), which were sequels to Herbert's 1966 novel Destination: Void. He also helped launch the career of Terry Brooks with a very positive review of Brooks' first novel, The Sword of Shannara, in 1977.

=== Success, family changes, and death ===
Herbert's change in fortune was shadowed by tragedy. In 1974, his wife Beverly underwent treatment for lung cancer. She lived ten more years, but her health was adversely affected by the treatment. In October 1978, Herbert was the featured speaker at the Octocon II science fiction convention held at the El Rancho Tropicana in Santa Rosa, California. In 1979, he met anthropologist Jim Funaro with whom he conceived the Contact Conference. In June 1981, Herbert was a guest of honour at Advention '81 in Adelaide, South Australia. Beverly Herbert died on February 7, 1984. Herbert completed and published Heretics of Dune that year. In his afterword to 1985's Chapterhouse: Dune, Herbert included a dedication to Beverly.

The year 1984 was a tumultuous year in Herbert's life. During this same year of his wife's death, his career took off with the release of David Lynch's film version of Dune. Despite high expectations, a big-budget production design and an A-list cast, the movie drew mostly poor reviews in the United States. However, despite a disappointing response in the US, the film was a critical and commercial success in Europe and Japan.

In 1985, after Beverly's death, Herbert married his former Putnam representative Theresa Shackleford. The same year he published Chapterhouse: Dune, which tied up many of the saga's story threads. This would be Herbert's final single work (the collection Eye was published that year, and Man of Two Worlds was published in 1986). He died of a massive pulmonary embolism while recovering from surgery for pancreatic cancer on February 11, 1986, in Madison, Wisconsin, aged 65.

=== Political views ===
Herbert was a Republican and an environmentalist. His political views have been variously described as conservative, reactionist, and libertarian. Herbert was politically active within the Republican Party, and worked as a speechwriter for several politicians, including Senator Guy Cordon. Herbert also volunteered on the campaign of Republican William Bantz in the 1958 Washington Senate election, who unsuccessfully challenged the incumbent Democrat Henry M. Jackson.

Herbert was a critic of the Soviet Union. He was a distant relative of the Republican senator Joseph McCarthy, whom he referred to as "Cousin Joe". However, he was appalled to learn of McCarthy's blacklisting of suspected communists from working in certain careers and believed that he was endangering essential freedoms of citizens of the United States. Herbert also opposed American involvement in the war in Vietnam. He was also critical of welfare, arguing that it increased dependence on the state.

Herbert believed that governments lie to protect themselves and that, following the Watergate scandal, President Richard Nixon had unwittingly taught an important lesson in not trusting government. He considered Nixon a better president than John F. Kennedy, calling the latter "one of the most dangerous presidents this country ever had." He praised President Ronald Reagan, for his pro-family and pro-individualist stances, while opposing his foreign policy.

In Chapterhouse: Dune, he wrote:

All governments suffer a recurring problem: Power attracts pathological personalities. It is not that power corrupts but that it is magnetic to the corruptible. Such people have a tendency to become drunk on violence, a condition to which they are quickly addicted.

— Frank Herbert, Chapterhouse: Dune

Herbert believed civil service to be "one of the most serious errors we made as a democracy" and that bureaucracy negatively impacts the lives of people in all forms of government. He stated that "every such bureaucracy eventually becomes an aristocracy" and uses preferential treatment and nepotism in favor of bureaucrats as his main arguments.

== Ideas and themes ==
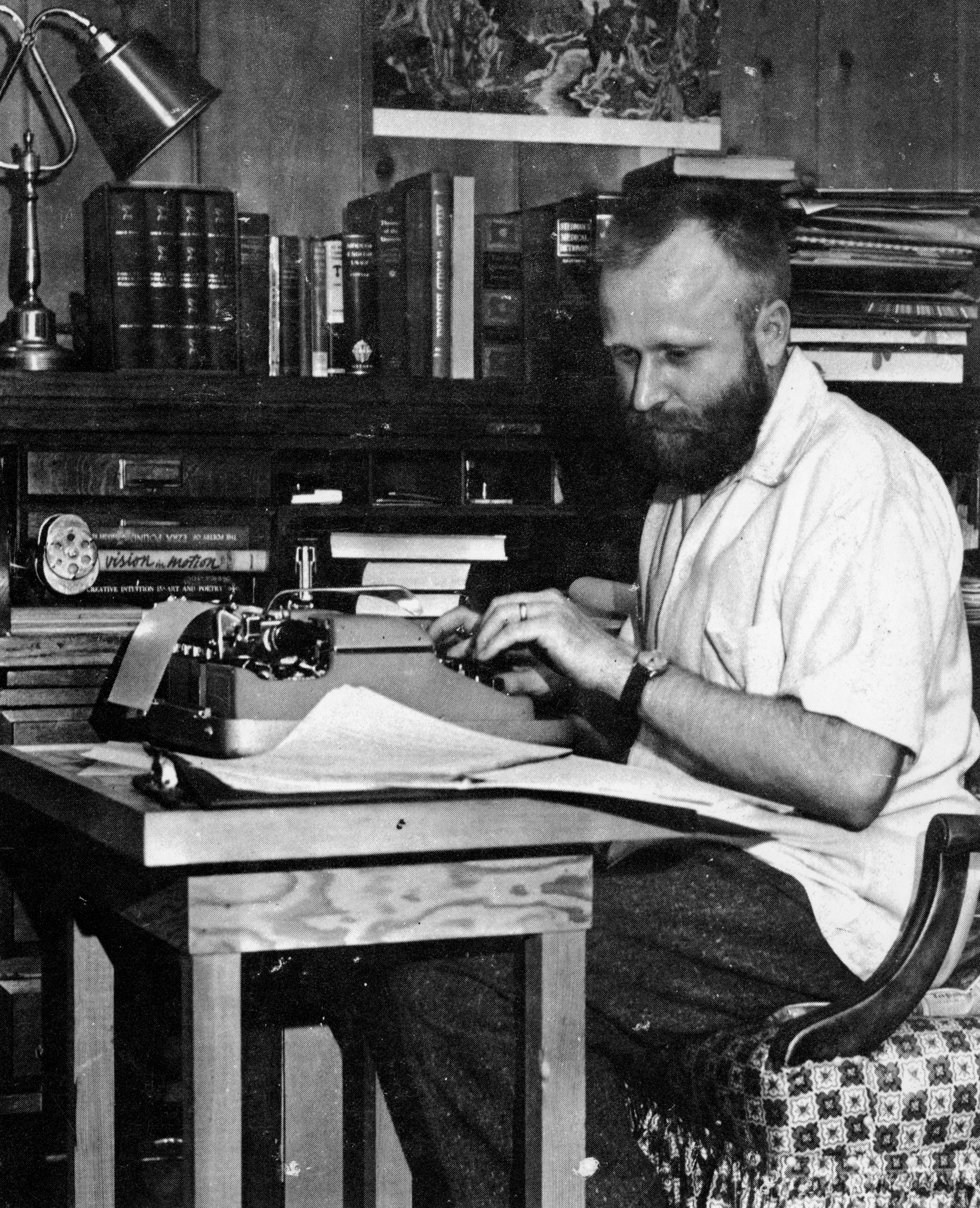
Herbert, c. 1969

Herbert used his science fiction novels to explore complex ideas involving philosophy, religion, psychology, politics and ecology. The underlying thrust of his work was a fascination with the question of human survival and evolution. Herbert has attracted a dedicated fan base, many of whom have attempted to read everything he wrote (fiction or non-fiction); indeed, such was the devotion of some of his readers that Herbert was at times asked if he was founding a cult, a proposition which he very much rejected.

There are a number of key themes found in Herbert's work:

- A concern with leadership: Herbert explored the human tendency to slavishly submit to charismatic leaders. He delved into both the flaws and potentials of bureaucracy and government.
- Herbert was among the first science fiction authors to popularize ideas about ecology and systems thinking. He stressed the need for humans to think both holistically and with regards to the long-term.
- The relationship between religion, politics and power.
- Human survival and adaptation: Herbert writes of the Fremen, the Sardaukar, and the Dosadi, who are molded by their terrible living conditions into dangerous super races.
- Human possibilities and potential: Herbert offered Mentats, the Bene Gesserit and the Bene Tleilax as different visions of human potential.
- The nature of sanity and madness. Herbert was interested in the work of Thomas Szasz and the anti-psychiatry movement. Often, Herbert poses the question, "What is sane?", and while there are clearly examples of insane behavior and psychopathy to be found in his works (as evinced by characters such as Piter De Vries), it is often suggested that normal and abnormal are relative terms which humans are sometimes ill-equipped to apply to one another, especially on the basis of statistical regularity.
- The possible effects and consequences of consciousness-altering chemicals, such as the spice in the Dune saga, as well as the 'Jaspers' fungus in The Santaroga Barrier, and the Kelp in the Destination: Void sequence.
- How language shapes thought. More specifically, Herbert was influenced by Alfred Korzybski's General Semantics. Algis Budrys wrote that Herbert's knowledge of language and linguistics was 'worth at least one PhD and the Chair of Philology at a good New England college'.
- Learning, teaching, and thinking.

Herbert refrained from offering his readers formulaic answers to many of the questions he explored.

== Status and influence on science fiction ==
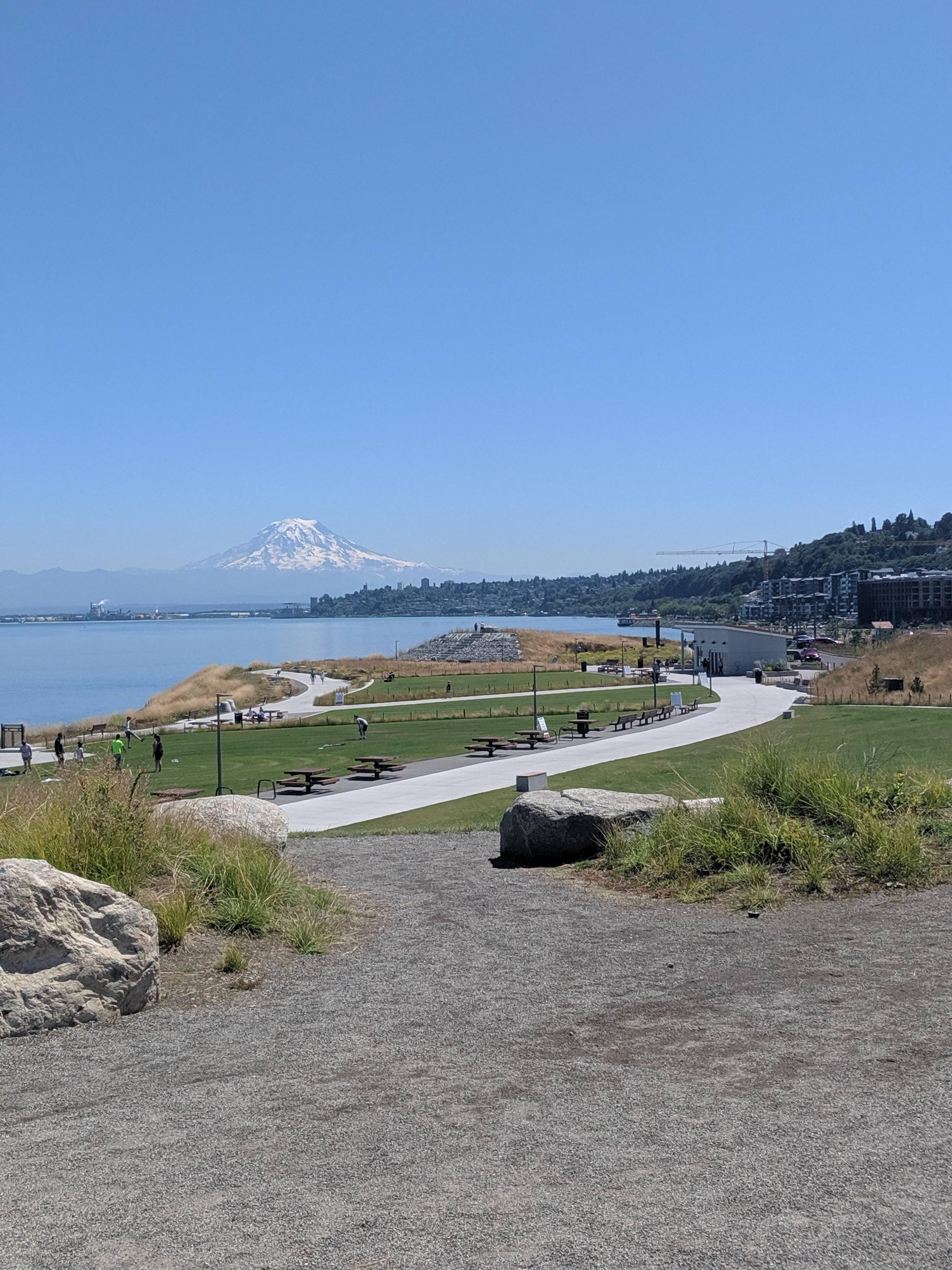
The Dune Peninsula at Point Defiance Park in Tacoma, Washington, with the volcano Mount Rainier in the distance

Dune and the Dune saga constitute one of the world's best-selling science fiction series and novels; Dune in particular has received widespread critical acclaim, winning the Nebula Award in 1965 and sharing the Hugo Award in 1966, and is frequently considered one of the best science fiction novels ever, if not the best. Locus subscribers voted it the all-time best SF novel in 1975, again in 1987, and the best "before 1990" in 1998.

Dune is considered a landmark novel for a number of reasons:

- Dune is a landmark of soft science fiction. Herbert deliberately suppressed technology in his Dune universe so that he could address the future of humanity, rather than the future of humanity's technology. Dune considers the way humans and their institutions might change over time.
- Herbert was a great popularizer of scientific ideas. In Dune, he helped popularize the term ecology. Gerald Jonas explains in The New York Times Book Review: "So completely did Mr. Herbert work out the interactions of man and beast and geography and climate that Dune became the standard for an emerging subgenre of 'ecological' science fiction."
- Dune is considered an example of literary world-building. The Library Journal reports that "Dune is to science fiction what The Lord of the Rings is to fantasy". Arthur C. Clarke is quoted as making a similar statement on the back cover of a paperback edition of Dune. Frank Herbert imagined every facet of his creation. He included glossaries, quotes, documents, and histories, to bring his universe alive to his readers.

Herbert never again equalled the critical acclaim he received for Dune. Neither his sequels to Dune nor any of his other books won a Hugo or Nebula Award, although almost all of them were New York Times Best Sellers.

Malcolm Edwards wrote, in The Encyclopedia of Science Fiction:

Much of Herbert's work makes difficult reading. His ideas were genuinely developed concepts, not merely decorative notions, but they were sometimes embodied in excessively complicated plots and articulated in prose which did not always match the level of thinking [...] His best novels, however, were the work of a speculative intellect with few rivals in modern science fiction.

The Science Fiction Hall of Fame inducted Herbert in 2006.

California State University, Fullerton's Pollack Library has several of Herbert's draft manuscripts of Dune and other works, with the author's notes, in their Frank Herbert Archives.

Metro Parks Tacoma named Dune Peninsula and the Frank Herbert Trail at Point Defiance Park in July 2019 to honor the hometown writer.

== Bibliography ==
=== Posthumously published works ===
Beginning in 2012, Herbert's estate and WordFire Press have released four previously unpublished novels in e-book and paperback formats: High-Opp (2012), Angels' Fall (2013), A Game of Authors (2013), and A Thorn in the Bush (2014).

In subsequent years, Frank Herbert's son Brian Herbert and author Kevin J. Anderson have added to the Dune franchise, using notes left behind by Frank Herbert and discovered over a decade after his death. Brian Herbert and Anderson have written three prequel trilogies (Prelude to Dune, Legends of Dune and Great Schools of Dune) exploring the history of the Dune universe before the events of the original novel, two novels that take place between novels of the original Dune sequels (with plans for more), as well as two post-Chapterhouse Dune novels that complete the original series (Hunters of Dune and Sandworms of Dune) based on Frank Herbert's own Dune 7 outline.

== Sources ==
- Touponce, William F. (1988). Frank Herbert. Twayne Publishers. ISBN 0-8057-7514-5. OCLC 16717899.
