= Tula Harkonnen =

Fictional character in the Dune: Prophecy television series

- Dune: Prophecy character
- Olivia Williams in the 2024 television series
- First appearance: Mentats of Dune; 2014
- Created by: Brian Herbert & Kevin J. Anderson
- Portrayed by: Olivia Williams; Emma Canning (young)

In-universe information
- Species: Human
- Gender: Female
- Title: Reverend Mother
- Affiliation: Sisterhood (Bene Gesserit)
- Significant other: Orry Atreides
- Children: Desmond Hart
- Relatives: Valya Harkonnen (sister); Griffin Harkonnen (brother); Harrow Harkonnen (nephew); Evgeny Harkonnen (uncle); Vergyl Harkonnen (father); Sonia Harkonnen (mother); Abulurd Harkonnen (great-grandfather); Novels: Danvis Harkonnen (brother); Weller Harkonnen (uncle); Dirdos Harkonnen (grandfather)

Tula Harkonnen is a fictional character in the 2024 HBO science fiction television series Dune: Prophecy, portrayed by Olivia Williams. She is a Reverend Mother of the Sisterhood, a secretive and powerful matriarchal order whose members undergo intense physical training and mental conditioning to obtain superhuman abilities. Set in Frank Herbert's Dune universe, ten thousand years before the events of his 1965 novel Dune, the series follows Tula and her sister, Valya Harkonnen (Emily Watson), as they combat forces that threaten humanity's future, and shape the Sisterhood's evolution into the Bene Gesserit order.

Tula first appears in the Great Schools of Dune (2012–2016) prequel trilogy of novels by Brian Herbert and Kevin J. Anderson.

== Character ==
=== Development and casting ===
In June 2019, Legendary Television announced a full series order of Dune: The Sisterhood, a series in development which would focus on the Bene Gesserit order and serve as a prequel to Denis Villeneuve's 2021 film adaptation Dune. It was further explained that the series "follows two Harkonnen sisters as they combat forces that threaten the future of humankind, and establish the fabled sect that will become known as the Bene Gesserit."

Shirley Henderson was originally cast as Tula Harkonnen, alongside Emily Watson as her sister Valya Harkonnen, in October 2022, but left the series during an extended production hiatus in February 2023. The role of Tula was recast with Olivia Williams in June 2023. Emma Canning was later cast as the younger version of Tula. The series was retitled Dune: Prophecy in November 2023.

=== Description ===
In the series, Tula Harkonnen is a Reverend Mother in the Sisterhood, a powerful social, religious, and political force whose members possess superhuman powers and abilities by undergoing years of intense physical and mental conditioning. Among these are the abilities to detect lies, and to use their voices to control the behavior of others. She is also the younger sister of Valya Harkonnen, the leader of the Sisterhood. This secretive, matriarchal order also continues to acquire power and influence as a means to direct the Imperium, and thereby humanity, on the path they have set for it.

Showrunner Alison Schapker said, "Valya Harkonnen and Tula Harkonnen share a past and certain trauma, and have a dynamic that's very specific to that family. And there is a bit of an older sibling, younger sibling dynamic. There is a bit of that relatable older sibling driving things overtly, and younger sibling feeling maybe a bit diminished or in the shadow of." Watson explained, "They both have secrets that they are bound together by their past and things that are really deeply, deeply and profoundly shocking that other people don't necessarily know about them. But also, Valya has always been the leader, she's always been the eldest who's brought Tula along with her. But Tula is the quiet one and is extremely surprising." Williams said, "There's a terrible, terrible loss in Tula's past, which is entirely due to her lack of confidence in herself, and a form of self-loathing that leads her to do something dreadful and unthinkable."

== Storyline ==
Set in Frank Herbert's Dune universe, Dune: Prophecy takes place ten thousand years before the events of his 1965 novel Dune. It centers on the origins of the Bene Gesserit, in particular the efforts of sisters Valya and Tula Harkonnen to "combat forces that threaten the future of humankind", as well as "a prophecy [which] foretells of a mysterious and powerful danger that threatens to destroy the Sisterhood." Schapker explained that the series explores multiple time periods, with the characters' pasts adapted from the Great Schools of Dune trilogy of novels by Brian Herbert and Kevin J. Anderson, and the present timeline original to the television series. In particular, the series depicts Valya in the present as the powerful leader of the Sisterhood, as well as her origins 30 years before.

In the series premiere "The Hidden Hand", young Tula Harkonnen has followed her elder sister and joined the Sisterhood on Wallach IX to escape her family's exile to a desolate world. Thirty years later, Valya is Mother Superior, and with Tula at her side has grown the Sisterhood in size and power. Tula oversees the training of the Sisterhood's acolytes, and serves as Valya's closest advisor. When Valya dismisses the dire visions of Imperial Truthsayer Kasha Jinjo, which challenge Valya's long-planned marriage arrangements for Princess Ynez-Arat, Tula urges her sister to consider the warning carefully.

In "Two Wolves", Valya instructs a reluctant Tula to put her protégée, Lila, through the dangerous Agony ritual to unlock her Other Memory and access information they desperately need to navigate the dangerous prophecy which is now unfolding. Lila is revealed to be the great-great-granddaughter of Raquella Berto-Anirul, the founder of the Sisterhood and Dorotea's granddaughter. Tula prepares the Rossak poison required, but explains to a fearful Lila, whom she has raised like a daughter, that she may choose for herself whether to risk her life. Lila agrees to submit to the Agony, and though she is able to access her genetic memory and pass on information from Raquella, she is overwhelmed by the inner voices and appears to die.

In "Sisterhood Above All", Tula is devastated by Lila's failure, and has been keeping the brain-dead girl alive against protocol. She eventually allows the other acolytes to say their goodbyes, and appears to euthanize her. However, with Valya away at the capital, Tula connects Lila to a secret thinking machine-powered life-support machine, demanding that the artificial intelligence, named Anirul, use the spice, a powerful psychotropic drug, to repair Lila's damaged brain. In the past, Valya and Tula's brother, Griffin Harkonnen, is killed, allegedly murdered by Vorian Atreides, the man responsible for their family's downfall. Tula, using the alias Tula Veil, begins a romantic relationship with Vorian's direct descendant, Orry Atreides, on Caladan. He asks her to marry him, she accepts, and they have sex. The next morning, Tula reveals her true identity, and is shocked when Orry says he does not care, and still loves her. He is horrified to discover that she has poisoned his entire clan overnight, and Tula mournfully kills Orry as well. She reports her success to Valya, hoping that the sisters can make a fresh start, with Tula joining the Sisterhood too.

In "Twice Born", the Sisterhood's acolytes, except for Sister Jen, are tortured by nightmares. A concerned Tula administers them with a dose of the spice and tasks them to draw images from their dreams. They all draw the holy sandworm of the desert planet Arrakis, source of the spice, and a pair of blue eyes. Tula subsequently has a vision that she slits the throat of acolyte Sister Emeline, who knows Tula's crimes. Tula discovers that Lila has awakened.

Trusting Jen for her nightmare resistance, Tula reveals the ailing Lila to her in "In Blood, Truth". Lila has become possessed by Raquella, and discovers that Kasha's mysterious burning death was caused by a virus. Tula analyzes a blood sample, provided by Valya, of Emperor Javicco Corrino's troublesome bashar Desmond Hart, who somehow caused Kasha's death and is immune to the Sisterhood's power of compulsion, the Voice. Tula is shocked to discover that Desmond has Atreides and Harkonnen blood. Elsewhere, Desmond tells Empress Natalya that his mother was a Sister, who left him to scavengers.

In "The High-Handed Enemy", young Tula witnesses young Valya use the Voice to order the suicide of Dorotea, Valya's rival for command of the Sisterhood and Raquella's great-granddaughter. Tula reveals to Valya that she is pregnant with Orry Atreides's child. Valya shows the Anirul device to Tula for the first time, and explains that as the first cross of Harkonnen and Atreides bloodlines, Tula's son will have the power to change the universe if they guide him. After birthing Desmond, Tula switches him with a stillborn baby to deceive Valya. In the present, the Suk doctor Sister Nazir tells Tula that fear feeds the virus, but dies analyzing it. Lila, now possessed by her grandmother, Dorotea, reveals that Valya made Dorotea and her followers commit suicide. Dorotea-as-Lila destroys Anirul, which had been her intent before Valya killed her. Desmond attempts to immolate Valya with his powers, but Tula helps her to survive, explaining that Desmond is able to control a virus that feeds on fear. She considers killing Desmond, but Tula reveals his parentage. She embraces her son, but his guards arrest her.

== Literary origins ==
Tula is introduced as a child in the 2012 prequel novel Sisterhood of Dune by Brian Herbert and Kevin J. Anderson. In its 2014 sequel, Mentats of Dune, Valya oversees Tula's training with the Sisterhood. Having discovered direct descendants of Vorian Atreides living on the planet Caladan, Valya sends her younger sister, using the alias Tula Veil, to exact their revenge. Tula marries young Orry Atreides, and murders him on their wedding night. In Navigators of Dune (2016), Tula is overcome with guilt over Orry, whom she had grown to love. She is hunted and nearly killed by Willem Atreides, Orry's brother, and Vorian himself. Valya captures Tula and tries to free her of any guilt or sympathy toward the Atreides, hoping she will next execute Willem and end the bloodline. Willem battles Tula, but stops short of killing her when she reveals she is carrying Orry's child.
