= Desmond Hart =

Fictional character in the Dune: Prophecy television series

- Dune: Prophecy character
- Travis Fimmel in the 2024 television series
- First appearance: "The Hidden Hand"; Dune: Prophecy; November 17, 2024
- Created by: Diane Ademu-John; Alison Schapker
- Portrayed by: Travis Fimmel

In-universe information
- Species: Human
- Gender: Male
- Occupation: Soldier
- Affiliation: Imperial army
- Relatives: Tula Harkonnen (mother); Orry Atreides (father); Valya Harkonnen (aunt); Griffin Harkonnen (uncle); Harrow Harkonnen (cousin); Keiran Atreides (cousin)

Desmond Hart is a fictional character in the 2024 HBO science fiction television series Dune: Prophecy, portrayed by Travis Fimmel. He is a mysterious, charismatic soldier in the Imperial army whose miraculous survival of an attack by a giant sandworm grants him deadly, seemingly supernatural powers. Set in Frank Herbert's Dune universe, ten thousand years before the events of his 1965 novel Dune, the series finds Desmond ingratiating himself to Emperor Javicco Corrino (Mark Strong), and plotting to destroy the powerful Sisterhood, led by Valya Harkonnen (Emily Watson).

== Character ==
=== Development and casting ===
In June 2019, Legendary Television announced a full series order of Dune: The Sisterhood, a series in development which would focus on the Bene Gesserit order and serve as a prequel to Denis Villeneuve's 2021 film adaptation Dune. Travis Fimmel was cast as Desmond Hart in November 2022. The character was created specifically for the series. Informed of Desmond's story arc before filming began, Fimmel was "intrigued" by the character, whom he described as not fully defined at that point. He praised the collaborative atmosphere set by the creators, noting that "They let you make a lot of decisions."

=== Description ===
Desmond is introduced as a mysterious, charismatic soldier in the Imperial army who seeks the trust of the Emperor, and emerges as an enemy to the Sisterhood. Fimmel said, "Desmond certainly doesn't want to be in control of everything. But he wants the Imperium to be in safe hands, and he'll do whatever he can to manipulate that." Charles Papadopoulos of Screen Rant wrote that Desmond is similar to Dune character Duncan Idaho in that he is accomplished in desert warfare and has served several tours on Arrakis, but differs because Desmond "carries devious secrets and seems intent on manipulating those around him." Fimmel said, however, "I've always felt he was a guy who was representing the hardworking and the common folk."

In the premiere episode, Desmond demonstrates his ability to psychically immolate others from within, though using his powers causes him considerable physical pain. Fimmel said that the character is very driven to achieve his goals, and is willing to use violence to do so. He explained that though using his powers hurts Desmond physically and emotionally, "He still sort of enjoys it. He won't stop doing it." Desmond believes that, through the lens of what he thinks is best for the universe, "the sacrifice of one individual can save many thousands or millions of people’s lives."

Desmond holds a grudge against the Sisterhood, in part, because he grew up an orphan among scavengers, and from his perspective, was abandoned by the Sisterhood. Fimmel described the scene in the season one finale in which Desmond meets his long-lost mother:

I think the emotion is a bit too much for him at the moment. He felt that he’d be so angry, and I’m sure he’s visualized exactly what he’d say if he ever comes across his mother. And when that moment comes he’s just a little boy. He just wants her love.

Charles Papadopoulos of Screen Rant described the character as "a complex, enigmatic villain." Cheryl Eddy of Gizmodo wrote, "Spooky sandworm guy Desmond Hart, propelled by Travis Fimmel’s scenery-devouring performance, continues to dazzle and/or horrify, depending on whose side you’re on." Keith Phipps of Vulture wrote that Fimmel's performance "invest[s] Desmond with both menace and sympathy", arguing that "by the end of the season, once we’ve learned more about his background and motivations, Desmond’s one of the most sympathetic characters on the show."

== Storyline ==
Set in Frank Herbert's Dune universe, Dune: Prophecy takes place ten thousand years before the events of his 1965 novel Dune. It centers on the origins of the Bene Gesserit and their efforts to "combat forces that threaten the future of humankind", as well as "a prophecy [which] foretells of a mysterious and powerful danger that threatens to destroy the Sisterhood."

In "The Hidden Hand", renowned soldier Desmond Hart appears on the capital world of Salusa Secundus, having survived an attack on the Imperial mining operations on the desert planet Arrakis attributed to the native Fremen. He reveals to Emperor Javicco Corrino that the assault was in fact perpetrated by rebellious forces growing against him, and suggests that the "witches" of the Sisterhood may be intentionally not keeping him informed. Javicco confides in Desmond that he is uneasy about the politically necessary betrothal of his daughter Princess Ynez to young Pruwet Richese, and would be happy to be freed of it. Javicco finds a video of Desmond in the desert of Arrakis, not only surviving the attack but seemingly devoured by a giant sandworm. Desmond finds Pruwet and explains that there is a "war in plain sight" in that the Sisterhood has unacceptable influence over the Imperium. Desmond confesses that he has been given a "great power" by his near-death experience on Arrakis. Apologetically, he thanks Pruwet for his sacrifice and then psychically immolates the boy, an attack which simultaneously immolates Imperial Truthsayer Kasha Jinjo on Wallach IX.

In "Two Wolves", Desmond tells Javicco he killed Pruwet because the Emperor wanted him to. Shocked, Javicco has him arrested, but Empress Natalya suggests they use his unique powers for their own purposes. Detecting Javicco's lies about Desmond's involvement in Pruwet's death, Mother Superior Valya Harkonnen of the Sisterhood persuades the Emperor to let her interrogate the soldier. Desmond freely admits that he killed Pruwet for "justice", intimating Javicco's involvement, and Kasha because she was corrupt and "unworthy" to serve Javicco. He tells Valya that the sandworm on Arrakis "took my eye and granted me with a gift to see what even you cannot." Javicco rebuffs Valya's suggestion that he execute Desmond, and Natalya later frees the soldier. Pruwet's father, Duke Ferdinand Richese, rails against Javicco and threatens to overthrow and humiliate him. Desmond proves his loyalty by burning Ferdinand severely, until Javicco calls him off. Desmond informs Valya that the Emperor no longer requires her services, and expresses his intent to wipe out the Sisterhood. She employs the Voice to compel him to commit suicide, but to her shock, he is immune.

Ynez hears Desmond's murder confession in "Twice Born". With rumors swirling that Prewet was murdered, Desmond unsuccessfully recommends Javicco remove the Landsraad's Truthsayers. Manipulated by other nobles, Valya's nephew Harrow Harkonnen nearly accuses the Corrinos of murdering Pruwet, but Ynez interrupts and accuses Desmond. Valya's plan to reveal a rebel assassination attempt on the Emperor to win his favor is foiled when Desmond drags out rebel leader Horace, and immolates him and his conspirators with Javicco's consent. Valya collects a sample of wounded Desmond's blood.

Javicco makes Desmond the Bashar of an elite regiment in "In Blood, Truth". Harrow apologizes to Desmond for challenging Javicco, and blames Valya. Desmond wants proof of her complicity in rebel spice-smuggling. Harrow reports his meeting to Valya. Desmond's troops find spice at the Division bar, but Valya's secret agent Mikaela bombs the place and Desmond is the only survivor. On Wallach IX, Valya's sister, Tula Harkonnen, is shocked to discover that Desmond has Atreides and Harkonnen blood. Desmond tells Natalya that his mother was a Sister, who left him to scavengers. Natalya complains to Desmond that the Sisterhood stole her power and her daughter, then kisses him.

In "The High-Handed Enemy", young Tula is pregnant by Orry Atreides, whom she has murdered as revenge for the death of her brother, Griffin Harkonnen. Valya tells her that as the first cross of Harkonnen and Atreides bloodlines, Tula's son will have the power to change the universe if they guide him. After birthing Desmond, Tula switches him with a stillborn baby to deceive Valya. In the present, Javicco begs Valya's assistance against Desmond, who has become too powerful. Valya intentionally antagonizes the Emperor and is arrested, allowing her to free an imprisoned Ynez and her lover, Keiran Atreides. The trio flee as Valya's minion Sister Theodosia, secretly a shapeshifter, stabs Desmond. He attempts to immolate Valya with his powers. Tula helps her to survive, explaining that Desmond is able to control a virus that feeds on fear. Valya sees a vision of a blue-"eyed" machine forcibly implant technology in Desmond. She considers killing Desmond, but Tula reveals his parentage. Valya says some hidden hand, grasping for control, also realized Desmond's potential. Tula embraces Desmond, but his guards arrest her.

== Literary origins ==
Though Desmond is an original character created for the series, the Great Schools of Dune (2012–2016) prequel trilogy of novels by Brian Herbert and Kevin J. Anderson features a storyline in which Orry Atreides fathers a child with Tula Harkonnen. Orry's murder in the television series is adapted from the novels, which also include a sequence in which Tula reveals her pregnancy to Orry's brother, Willem, and the siblings' ancestor, Vorian Atreides.
