= Valya Harkonnen =

Fictional character in the Dune: Prophecy television series

- Dune: Prophecy character
- Emily Watson in the 2024 television series
- First appearance: Sisterhood of Dune; 2012
- Created by: Brian Herbert & Kevin J. Anderson
- Portrayed by: Emily Watson; Jessica Barden (young)

In-universe information
- Species: Human
- Gender: Female
- Title: Reverend Mother
- Occupation: Leader of the Sisterhood
- Affiliation: Bene Gesserit
- Relatives: Tula Harkonnen (sister); Griffin Harkonnen (brother); Harrow Harkonnen (nephew); Evgeny Harkonnen (uncle); Vergyl Harkonnen (father); Sonia Harkonnen (mother); Abulurd Harkonnen (great-grandfather); Novels: Danvis Harkonnen (brother); Weller Harkonnen (uncle); Dirdos Harkonnen (grandfather)

Valya Harkonnen is a fictional character in the 2024 HBO science fiction television series Dune: Prophecy, portrayed by Emily Watson. She is the leader of the Sisterhood, a secretive and powerful matriarchal order whose members undergo intense physical training and mental conditioning to obtain superhuman abilities. Set in Frank Herbert's Dune universe, ten thousand years before the events of his 1965 novel Dune, the series follows Valya and her sister, Tula Harkonnen (Olivia Williams), as they combat forces that threaten humanity's future, and shape the Sisterhood's evolution into the Bene Gesserit order.

Valya first appears in the Great Schools of Dune (2012–2016) prequel trilogy of novels by Brian Herbert and Kevin J. Anderson.

== Character ==
=== Development and casting ===
In June 2019, Legendary Television announced a full series order of Dune: The Sisterhood, a series in development which would focus on the Bene Gesserit order and serve as a prequel to Denis Villeneuve's 2021 film adaptation Dune. It was further explained that the series "follows two Harkonnen sisters as they combat forces that threaten the future of humankind, and establish the fabled sect that will become known as the Bene Gesserit."

The casting of Emily Watson as Valya Harkonnen was announced in October 2022. In November 2023, the series was retitled Dune: Prophecy. In May 2024, Jessica Barden was cast as the younger version of Valya.

=== Description ===
In the series, Valya Harkonnen is the leader of the Sisterhood, a powerful social, religious, and political force whose members possess superhuman powers and abilities by undergoing years of intense physical and mental conditioning. Among these are the abilities to detect lies, and to use their voices to control the behavior of others. This secretive, matriarchal order also continues to acquire power and influence as a means to direct the Imperium, and thereby humanity, on the path they have set for it.

Watson described Valya as powerful and talented, yet damaged, traumatized and "driven by vengeance ... a properly messed up, complicated character". Valya leaves her family for the Sisterhood, and Watson explains:

It's there that there's a charismatic leader who sees her and goes, "I see you, you are special." And being told you're special when you're a young person is a very, very powerful thing to do to somebody, and it gives her a sense of passion and really a sense of a vision and a mission ... she believes that her mission is more important than what we would naturally assume is the moral compass that we would recognize ... She's kind of a puppetmaster, manipulating the balance of power in the human world across the universe. She's dictating the path that humanity is taking. And they have this program of what, basically it's really kind of eugenics about making sure the right people breed with the right people to get the best leaders the right path ahead.

Showrunner Alison Schapker said, "Valya Harkonnen and Tula Harkonnen share a past and certain trauma, and have a dynamic that's very specific to that family. And there is a bit of an older sibling, younger sibling dynamic. There is a bit of that relatable older sibling driving things overtly, and younger sibling feeling maybe a bit diminished or in the shadow of." Watson explained, "They both have secrets that they are bound together by their past and things that are really deeply, deeply and profoundly shocking that other people don't necessarily know about them. But also, Valya has always been the leader, she's always been the eldest who's brought Tula along with her." She said, "What was really delicious to me as an actor about coming into this world was that these women are from a truly, truly, recognizably messed-up family. They've had an awful childhood and it's sort of propelled them away. And nothing, nothing in this world is good and bad; everything is compromised and strange, and yet what Valya Harkonnen sets her sights on is really determining the right path for humankind. That's her ambition."

Young Valya is described as "ambitious, stubborn and forceful". Watson and Barden discussed their shared character before filming. Watson said of Barden, "She's a real firebrand and just her actual nature, Jessica's nature, was very inspiring to me. She's just incredibly forthright. And we spoke really about the anger, the absolutely uncontrolled sort of powerful anger inside (Valya), which she later in life learns to channel into the ways of the Sisterhood ... It was a really important moment for me talking to her, [learning] her understanding of what this character was like as a young woman."

In the series, Mother Superior Valya schemes on a long term scale that involves fellow Sisters, Imperial power players and Emperor Javicco Corrino (Mark Strong) himself. Watson said, “Certain people will be in favor and in power. If they're no longer useful, then they will be removed. But they're allowed to think that they have power.” She added that Valya is "always one step ahead, moving on, ‘This is the plan', and she doesn't really care who she destroys in the wake of that." But Valya meets her match in Desmond Hart (Travis Fimmel), a mysterious and charismatic Imperial soldier who makes a play for Javicco's trust and who Valya finds is not easily controlled. She perceives him as both a threat and a mystery to be solved, and according to Watson, "Valya has the sort of presence of mind, call it what you will, to know that somehow there's a piece, there's a player somewhere that she can't discern and she hasn't found it yet, and she's going after it."

== Storyline ==
Set in Frank Herbert's Dune universe, Dune: Prophecy takes place ten thousand years before the events of his 1965 novel Dune. It centers on the origins of the Bene Gesserit, in particular the efforts of sisters Valya and Tula Harkonnen to "combat forces that threaten the future of humankind", as well as "a prophecy [which] foretells of a mysterious and powerful danger that threatens to destroy the Sisterhood." Schapker explained that the series explores multiple time periods, with the characters' pasts adapted from the Great Schools of Dune trilogy of novels by Brian Herbert and Kevin J. Anderson, and the present timeline original to the television series. In particular, the series depicts Valya in the present as the powerful leader of the Sisterhood, as well as her origins 30 years before.

In the series premiere "The Hidden Hand", young Valya Harkonnen has joined the Sisterhood on Wallach IX to escape her family's exile to a desolate world. Mother Superior Raquella, the leader of the Sisterhood, has created a network of influence by placing her Truthsayers, loyal to the Sisterhood, as trusted advisors to the Great Houses. She has also devised a secret breeding program, intended to guide noble bloodlines to cultivate better, more easily controlled leaders. Dying, Raquella tells Valya that she must grow, protect and strengthen the Sisterhood, and that Valya "will be the one to see the burning truth, and know." Raquella's granddaughter Dorotea intends to destroy the breeding program as something heretical and impure, so Valya uses the Voice to force Dorotea to kill herself. Thirty years later, Valya is Mother Superior, and with her sister Tula at her side, has grown the Sisterhood in size and power. Valya has arranged for Princess Ynez-Arat, the daughter and heir of Emperor Javicco Corrino, to be trained at the Sisterhood School, which will ultimately fulfill Valya's goal to place a Sister on the Imperial throne. Valya has also orchestrated a match between Ynez and nine-year-old Pruwet Richese to stabilize the Imperial bloodline for generations. Empress Natalya, Ynez's mother, is wary of Valya's influence and opposes the marriage, but Valya has manipulated events so that Javicco requires Richese ships to maintain his control of the planet Arrakis, only source of the all-important spice. After meeting the mysterious Imperial soldier Desmond Hart, Imperial Truthsayer Kasha Jinjo has unsettling visions that involve Ynez, and comes to believe that the marriage should not proceed. Her decades-long plan nearing fruition, Valya dismisses Kasha's warnings. On the capital world of Salusa Secundus, Desmond warns Javicco about rebellious forces growing against him, and Javicco indicates that he is uneasy about the betrothal. Desmond explains to Pruwet that the Sisterhood has unacceptable influence over the Imperium, and confesses that he has been given a "great power" by his near-death experience on Arrakis. Desmond psychically immolates Pruwet, an attack which simultaneously immolates Kasha on Wallach IX. A horrified Valya recalls Raquella's dying prediction.

In "Two Wolves", Valya instructs a reluctant Tula to put her protégée Lila, revealed to be Raquella's great-great-granddaughter, through the dangerous Agony ritual to unlock her Other Memory and contact Raquella. Valya takes Theodosia with her to Salusa Secundus, where she arrives unannounced to bring news of Kasha's death and assign Theodosia to bond with Ynez. Detecting Javicco's lies about Desmond's involvement in Pruwet's death, Valya persuades the Emperor to let her interrogate the soldier. Desmond readily admits to killing both Pruwet and Kasha, but Javicco rebuffs Valya's suggestion that he execute Desmond. Valya meets with her spy in the rebel faction plotting against Javicco: Mikaela, a Fremen bartender who is secretly a Sister. Valya has been supporting the insurgents to weaken the Emperor so he remains reliant on the Sisterhood. With the situation changed, she now intends to bolster Javicco and burn the rebel cell. Natalya, however, has convinced Javicco to use Desmond and his powers. Desmond subsequently informs Valya that the Emperor no longer requires her services, and expresses his intent to wipe out the Sisterhood. She employs the Voice to compel him to commit suicide, but to her shock, he is immune.

In "Sisterhood Above All", Valya reassures her Truthsayers on Salusa Secundus that she will turn the tables on Desmond and reassert her control over the Emperor. Valya then visits her estranged uncle, Evgeny Harkonnen. In the past, young Valya passionately calls for revenge against the Atreides. Her parents, Sonia and Vergyl, and uncle, Evgeny, are content living a quiet life on the ice planet Lankiveil. They do not want to risk further retaliation by the Atreides, especially since Vorian Atreides, the man responsible for their downfall, has recently resurfaced. Valya's brother, Griffin, shares her desire to restore their family's reputation, but is subsequently killed, allegedly murdered by Vorian. Valya leaves to join the Sisterhood, the elder Harkonnens blaming her for Griffin's death, but resists taking her vows because she still considers her family's vengeance her top priority. Raquella takes Valya under her wing, eventually sharing with her the secret of the forbidden technology used to maintain her vast DNA database. Valya, in turn, demonstrates her nascent talent, the Voice. Recognizing that her life is waning, Raquella intends to put Valya and Dorotea through the Agony to succeed her as leaders of the Sisterhood. Valya at first refuses, and Raquella issues the ultimatum that she take care of her family issues and return as a Reverend Mother, or not at all. Meanwhile, Tula has managed to assassinate Vorian's descendant, Orry Atreides, and his entire clan. When Sonia chastises Valya for her negative influence, Valya uses the Voice on her mother, silencing her and forcing her to pick up a blade. Satisfied that her family has been avenged, Valya self-administers the Rossak drug, and survives the Agony.

In "Twice Born", Valya finally fulfills House Harkonnen's request for a Truthsayer: with herself. She arranges for her nephew, Harrow Harkonnen, to fill the spot vacated by House Richese in the High Council. Valya's plan to reveal a rebel assassination attempt on the Emperor is foiled when Desmond drags out rebel leader Horace, and immolates him and his conspirators with Javicco's consent. Valya collects a sample of wounded Desmond's blood. Valya faces a gloating Evgeny, who laments what she has done to their family. Criticizing his weakness, she withholds his respirator, and he dies. Theodosia, revealed to be a shapeshifter, transforms into Griffin. Valya asks him if she pushed him too far. In "The High-Handed Enemy", young Tula witnesses Valya order Dorotea's suicide. Valya shows Anirul to Tula, and reveals her plan to mate Javicco to Natalya. In the present, Valya gives Sister Francesca, Javicco's former lover, a metacyanide gom jabbar needle to kill him. Javicco begs Valya's assistance against Desmond. She reveals the Sisterhood manipulated his whole life; he has her arrested. Valya uses the Voice to free Ynez and Keiran from Natalya's imprisonment, and they flee. Desmond ignites a virus in Valya's virus, but Tula helps her save herself by abandoning fear. Valya sees a shadowy person use blue-"eyed" machine to forcibly implant thinking-machine technology in Desmond's right eye. Valya, Keiran, and Ynez land on Arrakis.

== Literary origins ==
Valya Harkonnen first appears in the Great Schools of Dune (2012–2016) prequel trilogy of novels. Set in Frank Herbert's Dune universe, the series is a sequel to the Legends of Dune trilogy (2002–2004), and takes place nearly a century after the events of the third novel, The Battle of Corrin (2004), in which humanity finally defeats the thinking machine armies bent on their extinction. In The Battle of Corrin, Abulurd Harkonnen defies an order from his commander, Vorian Atreides, that would sacrifice many lives, and in doing so causes even more deaths. Vorian brands him a traitor, and the Harkonnens are exiled to the ice planet Lankiveil.

In the Great Schools of Dune series, the independent anti-technology forces gaining power in the aftermath of the Butlerian Jihad pose a threat to the nascent Spacing Guild, Bene Gesserit, Mentat and Suk Schools, and even the rule of Emperor Salvador Corrino. The Harkonnens have accepted their punishment, but a new generation manifest in Valya and Griffin Harkonnen hopes to reclaim their rightful place, and avenge themselves on the Atreides. Julio Bardini of Collider described Valya as "one of the most fascinating characters in the Dune continuity", and Bisma Fida of Game Rant called the character "arguably the most notable early figure in the Bene Gesserit Sisterhood." Valya singlehandedly ignites the Harkonnen-Atreides feud and mobilizes her siblings to the cause, while taking control of the fledgling Bene Gesserit and shaping it to her will as a formidable force in the universe.

=== Sisterhood of Dune (2012) ===
In Sisterhood of Dune, the remnants of House Harkonnen live a simple existence as whalers on the ice planet Lankiveil. Siblings Valya and Griffin Harkonnen, however, seek to restore the power and influence lost by their family when Jihad hero Vorian Atreides branded their great-grandfather Abulurd Harkonnen a traitor 80 years before. Griffin works to rise in the Landsraad assembly of noble Houses, and Valya becomes an acolyte of the Sisterhood on Rossak.

Five years later, Valya has become a trusted aide to Mother Superior Raquella Berto-Anirul, who has shared with Valya the secret that she has flouted the Butlerian prohibitions on thinking machines by using computers to maintain the extensive records of the Sisterhood's breeding program. Valya's rival in the Sisterhood, Sister Dorotea, is a Butlerian sympathizer who discovers the existence of Raquella's computers and reports it to Salvador. Valya helps Raquella remove them in advance of the Emperor's invasion, but a petulant Salvador disbands the Sisterhood School on Rossak. Dorotea returns to the capital world of Salusa Secundus with the Emperor as his Truthsayer, and forms an orthodox faction of sisters.

Valya learns that Vorian, made seemingly immortal by the thinking machines, is still alive. Bent on revenge, Griffin tracks Vorian to the desert planet Arrakis. Vorian saves Griffin from a giant sandworm, and Griffin subsequently defeats Vorian in a duel, but spares his life. Though they come to an understanding to end the Atreides-Harkonnen feud, Griffin is executed by Vorian's sister Hyla, an assassin loyal to the vanquished thinking machines who, with her twin Andros, wants Vorian to join them in resurrecting the machine empire. Vorian returns Griffin's body to Lankiveil with a letter of condolence, and Valya refuses to believe he did not kill her brother himself. She swallows and survives the dangerous Rossak drug and gains access to the memories and mental presences of her female ancestors, becoming the third Reverend Mother after Raquella and Dorotea. Raquella and Valya take their followers to regroup on a new planet, Wallach IX.

=== Mentats of Dune (2014) ===
In Mentats of Dune, Valya studies with the Swordmasters of the Ginaz so she can someday kill Vorian. She also trains herself in the Voice, a power newly-discovered by Raquella allowing her to control others using precise tonal changes in her voice. Valya retrieves the hidden computers from Rossak and hopes to succeed Raquella as Mother Superior. Nearing the end of her life, Raquella believes that the only hope for the Sisterhood to survive is for the Wallach IX sisters to reconcile with Dorotea's faction. She forces Valya and Dorotea to put their differences aside and agree to work together for the good of the Sisterhood. Naming them co-leaders, Raquella dies. Valya however, still bitter about Dorotea's betrayal, uses the Voice to force Dorotea to commit suicide. Valya declares herself to be the sole Mother Superior, and ingratiates herself to the new Emperor, Salvador's brother, Roderick Corrino. Vorian, feeling guilty for Griffin's death, tries to help the struggling Harkonnens with a secret infusion of funds to their whaling business on Lankiveil. He visits the planet Caladan to meet his descendants there, just in time for young Orry Atreides to be slain on his wedding night by his new bride: Griffin and Valya's younger sister, Tula.

=== Navigators of Dune (2016) ===
In Navigators of Dune, Valya has renamed the Sisterhood as the Bene Gesserit, and erected the Mother School. Tula, who had come to love Orry and fled out of guilt for murdering him, is hunted and nearly killed by his brother Willem Atreides and Vorian. Valya captures Tula and tries to free her of any guilt or sympathy toward the Atreides, hoping she will next execute Willem and end the bloodline. Though her Truthsayer Cindel assures Valya that Vorian is not lying when he says he did not kill Griffin, she refuses to believe it. On Corrin, Vorian duels Valya as Willem battles Tula. Valya finds that Vorian is immune to the Voice, and Willem stops short of killing Tula when she reveals she is carrying Orry's child. With the fighting at a stalemate, Vorian leaves the planet but is presumed dead when his ship explodes, though he survives. Valya guides her young brother Danvis Harkonnen as he begins service in the royal court, and resumes her duties as leader of the Bene Gesserit.
