= List of Dune: Prophecy characters =

Characters from the HBO television series Dune: Prophecy (2024). From left to right: Travis Fimmel as Desmond Hart, Emily Watson as Valya Harkonnen, Olivia Williams as Tula Harkonnen and Mark Strong as Emperor Javicco Corrino

Dune: Prophecy is an American science fiction television series developed by Diane Ademu-John and Alison Schapker for HBO. Set in Frank Herbert's Dune universe, the series focuses on the origins of the Bene Gesserit, a powerful social, religious, and political force whose members possess superhuman powers and abilities after undergoing years of intense physical and mental conditioning. Dune: Prophecy is a prequel to the 2021 Denis Villeneuve film Dune, which adapts the first half the 1965 novel of the same name by Frank Herbert, and it takes place some 10,000 years before the events of the film. The series, which draws on, but is set after, the Great Schools of Dune novel trilogy (2012–2016) by Brian Herbert and Kevin J. Anderson, is produced by Legendary Television, with Schapker serving as showrunner, writer, and executive producer.

The series stars Emily Watson as Valya Harkonnen, leader of the Sisterhood; Olivia Williams as Tula Harkonnen, Valya's younger sister; Travis Fimmel as Desmond Hart, an Imperial soldier; and Mark Strong as Emperor Javicco Corrino. The rest of the ensemble cast includes Jodhi May as Javicco's consort, Empress Natalya; Sarah-Sofie Boussnina as their daughter and heir, Princess Ynez-Arat; Shalom Brune-Franklin as Mikaela, a Fremen spy for the Sisterhood; Jade Anouka as Sister Theodosia, an acolyte of the Sisterhood; and Chris Mason as Keiran Atreides, the Swordmaster of House Corrino.

== Main ==
=== Valya Harkonnen ===
Valya Harkonnen, portrayed by Emily Watson, is the Mother Superior of the Sisterhood, a secretive, matriarchal order whose members undergo intense physical training and mental conditioning to obtain superhuman abilities. In the series, she faces threats to the Sisterhood's plans for humanity.

Watson's casting in the role was announced in October 2022. In May 2024, Jessica Barden was cast as the younger version of Valya.

Valya is introduced as a young woman in the Great Schools of Dune trilogy of novels (2012–2016) by Brian Herbert and Kevin J. Anderson. She plots to rise within, and ultimately take control of, the fledgling Bene Gesserit, while galvanizing her siblings to help her visit Harkonnen vengeance on the bloodline of Vorian Atreides, who had brought their family to ruin 80 years before.

=== Tula Harkonnen ===
Tula Harkonnen, portrayed by Olivia Williams, is Valya's younger sister and a Reverend Mother in the Sisterhood. In the series, Tula is Valya's loyal second-in-command, but a secret from her past comes back to threaten everything she and her sister have built.

Shirley Henderson was originally cast as Tula alongside Watson in October 2022, but left the series during an extended production hiatus in February 2023. The role of Tula was recast with Williams in June 2023. Emma Canning was later cast as the younger version of Tula.

Tula is introduced as a young woman in the Great Schools of Dune trilogy of novels (2012–2016) by Brian Herbert and Kevin J. Anderson. She is Valya's tool of revenge against the descendants of Vorian Atreides, but grows remorseful of her crimes against them.

=== Desmond Hart ===
Desmond Hart, portrayed by Travis Fimmel, is a mysterious, charismatic soldier in the Imperial army who seeks the trust of the Emperor Javicco Corrino, and emerges as an enemy to the Sisterhood.

Fimmel was cast as Desmond in November 2022. The character was created specifically for the series.

=== Empress Natalya ===
Empress Natalya-Arat, portrayed by Jodhi May, is the consort of Emperor Javicco Corrino and mother to their daughter and heir, Princess Ynez-Arat. She is described as "a formidable royal who united thousands of worlds in her marriage to Emperor Corrino." May said, "I love the fact that Natalya has to operate in a way that's pretty underhanded, so it's a real exploration of power that we are not necessarily used to seeing. She's almost like a kind of politician who has to maneuver and manipulate."

In the series premiere "The Hidden Hand", Natalya opposes the match orchestrated by Mother Superior Valya between Ynez and young nine-year-old Pruwet Richese. Natalya is suspect of Valya's motives, but by design, Javicco requires Richese ships to maintain his control of the desert planet Arrakis, only source of the all-important spice. She is frustrated that Javicco no longer heeds her advice like he used to, when she negotiated their marriage. During the engagement celebration, Natalya is horrified by Pruwet's possession of forbidden technology in the form of a robotic toy lizard, and his father Duke Ferdinand Richese's flippant acceptance of it. She angrily reminds the Duke that he only exists because the Corrinos defeated the thinking machines, and is shocked speechless when Javicco declares he will ignore the transgression for the evening. In "Two Wolves", Natalya angers Ferdinand by suggesting that Pruwet's death was an accident, likely caused by his robotic toy. She is intrigued by Desmond's powers, and recognizing his loyalty to Javicco, suggests that they use them. Natalya frees Desmond, and when Ferdinand rails against Javicco and threatens to overthrow and humiliate him, Desmond proves his loyalty by burning Ferdinand severely.

Indira Varma was originally cast as Natalya in October 2022. In June 2023, May was cast to replace Varma, who exited the series due to scheduling conflicts after an extended production hiatus.

=== Princess Ynez ===
Princess Ynez-Arat, portrayed by Sarah-Sofie Boussnina, is the daughter and heir of Emperor Javicco Corrino and Empress Natalya. She is described as "an independent young princess dealing with the pressures of her responsibility as heir to the Golden Lion Throne."

In "The Hidden Hand", Princess Ynez is the heir to the Golden Lion Throne, training in swordplay under Corrino Swordmaster Kieran Atreides, and preparing to enter the Sisterhood as an acolyte. Though Natalya dislikes both Ynez's betrothal to young Pruwet Richese and her daughter's plans to join the Sisterhood, Ynez sees these as being useful to her as the future Empress. Meanwhile, Mother Superior Valya is determined that Ynez's training will cultivate loyalty to the Sisterhood into the future Empress. Ynez tries to connect with her nine-year-old future husband during the engagement ceremony, but scolds him harshly after his possession of forbidden technology is revealed. On the eve of her departure for the Sisterhood School, Ynez and Keiran take recreational drugs and have sex. In "Two Wolves", Ynez is traumatized by the death of her close confidante, Imperial Truthsayer Kasha Jinjo. Mother Superior Valya Harkonnen assigns Sister Theodosia to bond with the Princess. Her departure delayed, Ynez has a close moment with Keiran, and tells him about how she and her illegitimate half-brother, Constantine Corrino, were kidnapped and held captive by rebels as children. Ynez and Keiran agree they cannot become romantically involved.

Boussnina was cast as Ynez in October 2022.

=== Lila ===
Lila, portrayed by Chloe Lea, is the youngest acolyte at the Sisterhood School, described as having "a deep empathy beyond her years." Lila is one of the girls raised by the Sisterhood with no knowledge of their biological families so as to emphasize the importance of the Sisterhood in their lives. Schapker explained:

[Lila] does think of the Sisterhood as her family, and it's all she's known. And Tula has very much been a mother figure to her. And on the other hand, she doesn't really have the full story of her origin. And there's a ritual that Lila is going to be asked to participate in that would unlock some of those answers for her, but at great risk. And so the question of who Lila is matters to the series, and how that plays out. Her desire to know those answers will very much affect how the story goes forward.

In "The Hidden Hand", Lila is the favorite pupil of Tula Harkonnen. While Mother Superior Valya describes her as "a lamb lost in the woods", Tula notes that Lila is a "true empath" who needs to be nurtured, and that "given her lineage, she will be a natural born Truthsayer." In "Two Wolves", Lila is revealed to be the great-great-granddaughter of Raquella Berto-Anirul, the founder of the Sisterhood. Desperate for more information about the dangerous prophecy which is now unfolding, Valya instructs a reluctant Tula to put Lila through the dangerous Agony ritual to unlock her Other Memory and access Raquella's consciousness. Tula and Lila acknowledge to each other that they feel like mother and daughter, and Tula insists the choice to risk her life is Lila's. Though scared, Lila believes in the Sisterhood and their mission, and consents to submit to the Agony. She is administered the deadly Rossak poison, which she is able to render harmless using her control of her internal chemistry. The genetic memories of her maternal ancestors are unlocked, and Raquella speaks through her. However, the consciousness of Lila's grandmother Dorotea, bitter that Valya forced her to commit suicide, overwhelms Lila, who appears to die. In "Sisterhood Above All", Tula is devastated by Lila's failure, and has been keeping the brain-dead girl alive against protocol. She eventually allows the other acolytes to say their goodbyes, and appears to euthanize her. However, with Valya away at the capital, Tula connects Lila to a secret thinking machine-powered life-support machine, demanding that the artificial intelligence, named Anirul, begins using the spice to repair Lila's damaged brain.

Lea was cast as Lila in October 2022.

=== Keiran Atreides ===
Keiran Atreides, portrayed by Chris Mason, is the new Swordmaster of House Corrino. He has a strong sense of right and wrong, and struggles with the corruption of the royal court and his own family's legacy.

In "The Hidden Hand", Keiran has been tasked with training the future Empress, Princess Ynez, in swordplay. She is formally betrothed to nine-year-old Pruwet Richese, but her mother, Empress Natalya, has noticed Ynez's attraction to Keiran. On the eve of her departure to Wallach IX to be trained by the Sisterhood, Ynez and Keiran take recreational drugs and have sex. In "Two Wolves", Keiran is revealed to be a direct descendant of Vorian Atreides, as well as a spy for a faction of insurgents plotting against Emperor Javicco and the Great Houses. He provides plans of the Imperial palace to his conspirators, who include the bartender Mikaela. She warns him that getting attached to Ynez will complicate their scheme. Keiran has a close moment with Ynez, but they agree they cannot become romantically involved.

Mason was cast as Keiran in December 2022.

=== Mikaela ===
Mikaela, portrayed by Shalom Brune-Franklin, is described as "a strong-willed Fremen woman who serves the royal family while longing for a home planet she's never known."

In "The Hidden Hand", Mikaela is a bartender at the nightclub where Princess Ynez and her illegitimate half-brother, Constantine Corrino, go on the eve of her departure to Wallach IX to be trained by the Sisterhood. Mikaela is acquainted with Keiran Atreides, who is also there and goes off with Ynez. In "Two Wolves", Mikaela is revealed to be part of a faction of insurgents, which also includes Keiran, plotting against Emperor Javicco and the Great Houses. She is also secretly a member of the Sisterhood, using the insurgents to weaken Javicco so that he remains reliant on the Sisterhood. When Mother Superior Valya informs her that the Sisterhood now needs to bolster Javicco, Mikaela is surprised but readily offers to burn the entire resistance cell, starting with Kieran.

Brune-Franklin was cast as Mikaela in October 2022.

=== Javicco Corrino ===
Javicco Corrino, portrayed by Mark Strong, is the Padishah Emperor of the Known Universe. He is described as "a man from a great line of war-time Emperors, who is called upon to govern the Imperium and manage a fragile peace."

In "The Hidden Hand", Javicco has consented to a match, orchestrated by Mother Superior Valya, between his daughter, Princess Ynez, and nine-year-old Pruwet Richese. Thanks to Valya's machinations, Javicco requires Richese ships to maintain his control of the planet Arrakis, only source of the all-important spice, and is thus frustrated by his weak negotiating position with Duke Ferdinand Richese. Renowned Imperial soldier Desmond Hart warns Javicco about rebellious forces growing against him, and Javicco indicates that he is uneasy about the betrothal, and would be happy to be freed of it. Desmond subsequently meets with Pruwet and uses a newly-acquired power to immolate him. In "Two Wolves", Desmond tells Javicco he killed Pruwet because the Emperor wanted him to. Shocked, Javicco has him arrested, but Natalya suggests they use his unique powers. Javicco attempts to hide Desmond's guilt from Valya, and though she easily detects the lie and suggests that Desmond be executed, Javicco defers the decision. A grieving Ferdinand rails against Javicco and threatens to overthrow and humiliate him. Desmond proves his loyalty by burning Ferdinand severely, until Javicco calls him off.

Strong was cast as Javicco in December 2022.

Young Javicco is introduced as a child in the 2014 novel Mentats of Dune by Brian Herbert and Kevin J. Anderson, and is a supporting character in its 2016 sequel, Navigators of Dune. He is the young son and heir of Roderick Corrino, who becomes emperor when his brother, Emperor Salvador Corrino, is assassinated. Javicco's seven-year-old sister, Nantha, is killed in Mentats of Dune, trampled to death by an anti-technology mob incited by demagogue Manford Torondo. In Navigators of Dune, Javicco is confused when Manford erects a giant statue of Nantha outside the palace. Roderick explains that it is a futile attempt by the man responsible for Nantha's death to make the Imperial family forget.

=== Theodosia ===
Sister Theodosia, portrayed by Jade Anouka, is described as "a talented and ambitious acolyte at the Sisterhood who harbors a dangerous secret about her past." Anouka called the character "ambitious, mysterious and capable." Watson said of Theodosia's murky origins:

You don't necessarily understand what the situation is yet, but Theodosia's circumstances are very unique, and she has come as an outcast from a very difficult, desperate past to the Sisterhood in a little bit in the same way that Valya did. Valya kind of has recognized her as having the same kind of drive, and almost it's as if really damaged people are very, very good candidates for this kind of devotion or drive that it needs to be a really, really good Bene Gesserit.

In "The Hidden Hand", Tula notes that Theodosia is Valya's favorite pupil, and says "She has reason to be loyal to us. We took her in when she had nowhere else to turn. She excels in her studies. She is uniquely useful." In "Two Wolves", Valya takes Theodosia with her to Salusa Secundus, where she arrives unannounced to bring news of Imperial Truthsayer Kasha Jinjo's death and assign Theodosia to bond with Princess Ynez.

Anouka was cast as Theodosia in December 2022.

=== Harrow Harkonnen ===
Harrow Harkonnen, portrayed by Edward Davis, is the current Baron Harkonnen, "who harbors a strong desire to elevate his House to its former glory."

In "The Hidden Hand", the Harkonnen family makes a fourth request to Mother Superior Valya to assign them a Truthsayer, which she refuses again. At the engagement celebration for Princess Ynez and Pruwet Richese, Harrow pitches his family's whale fur and whale sperm exports to a disinterested Emperor Javicco. In "Sisterhood Above All", Harrow greets his "Aunt Valya" when the Mother Superior arrives to visit her estranged uncle, Evgeny Harkonnen.

Davis was cast as Harrow in December 2022.

=== Constantine Corrino ===
Constantine Corrino, portrayed by Josh Heuston, is the illegitimate son of Javicco who is "torn between seeking his father's approval, and his own happiness."

In "The Hidden Hand", Constantine is close to his half-sister, Princess Ynez, and handles the final negotiations for her entry into the Sisterhood on his father's behalf. He insists that Mother Superior Valya grant Ynez private quarters, and when Valya refuses, he laughs, "I had to try." In "Two Wolves", Constantine has a sexual encounter with Shannon Richese, daughter of Duke Ferdinand Richese, during which he learns about her father's designs on Arrakis but also inadvertently reveals Desmond Hart's connection to her brother Pruwet's death.

Heuston was cast as Constantine in December 2022.

=== Jen ===
Sister Jen, portrayed by Faoileann Cunningham, is "a fierce, unpredictable acolyte in training at the Sisterhood School who rarely reveals her emotional core."

In "The Hidden Hand", Tula says that "Jen has bite", and Valya agrees that "She'll go far—if she can be tamed." But in considering which acolyte to pair with their incoming pupil, Princess Ynez, Valya says of Jen: "She's too independent a thinker. We need to pair Ynez with someone we can trust to keep her in line." In "Two Wolves", Jen warns Lila against undergoing the dangerous Agony ritual because she believes the Sisterhood clearly care about their own goals more than they care about Lila.

Cunningham was cast as Jen in October 2022.

=== Emeline ===
Sister Emeline, portrayed by Aoife Hinds, is "a zealous acolyte descended from a long line of martyrs, who carries fervent religion to her training at the Sisterhood."

In "The Hidden Hand", Valya says that Emeline is "too rigid" and "reeks of piety" when considering which acolyte to pair with their incoming pupil, Princess Ynez. Valya says, "Our aim is not to broaden the Princess's world view, it's to adhere her to our own ... Emeline is a bad influence." In "Two Wolves", Lila comes to Emeline when considering whether to undergo the dangerous Agony ritual to aid the Sisterhood. Emeline reveals that her family fought with Rayna Butler in the Battle of Corrin, and sacrificed themselves to allow time for the human fleet to destroy the thinking machine army with atomics. She says, "Human life is sacred .... that's why there is no greater honor than to give it."

Hinds was cast as Emeline in October 2022.

=== Evgeny Harkonnen ===
Evgeny Harkonnen, portrayed by Mark Addy, is Valya and Tula's uncle and a once-powerful member of the banished House Harkonnen. He blames Valya for their family's fall from grace.

In "Sisterhood Above All", young Valya Harkonnen calls for revenge against House Atreides. Her uncle, Evgeny, and parents Vergyl and Sonia Harkonnen are content living a quiet life on the ice planet Lankiveil. They do not want to risk further retaliation by the Atreides, especially since Vorian Atreides, the man responsible for their disgrace, has recently resurfaced. Valya's brother, Griffin, shares her desire to restore their family's reputation, but is subsequently killed, allegedly murdered by Vorian. Valya leaves to join the Sisterhood, the elder Harkonnens blaming her for Griffin's death. In the present, Valya, now Mother Superior, visits Evgeny in the wake of losing her direct influence over Emperor Javicco Corrino.

== Recurring ==
=== Dorotea ===
Reverend Mother Dorotea, portrayed by Camilla Beeput, is young Valya Harkonnen's rival in the Sisterhood, and the granddaughter and heir apparent of Mother Superior Raquella. She is described as "pious and determined to return the Sisterhood to what she believes are its core values."

In "The Hidden Hand", Dorotea and Valya are at a dying Raquella's bedside to hear her final words, urging them to "use every tool" to grow, protect and strengthen the Sisterhood after her death. Valya urges the gathered Sisters to carry on Raquella's legacy by expanding their reach and influence, and by pushing the boundaries of their abilities. Dorotea, however, preaches humility, and indirect power. Raquella has devised a secret breeding program, intended to guide noble bloodlines to cultivate better, more easily controlled leaders. With Raquella dead, Dorotea rushes to destroy it, believing it to be sinful. Valya uses the Voice to stop her, and when Dorotea refuses to bend to Valya's will, she commands Dorotea to commit suicide.

In "Two Wolves", Sister Lila is revealed to be Dorotea's granddaughter. With the Sisterhood desperate for more information about the dangerous prophecy which is now unfolding, Lila undergoes the dangerous Agony ritual to unlock her Other Memory and access Raquella's consciousness. Raquella speaks through her, but then the vengeful persona of Dorotea overwhelms Lila, who appears to die. "Sisterhood Above All" depicts Dorotea looking on as Raquella meets and takes Valya under her wing. Recognizing that her life is waning, Raquella intends to put Valya and Dorotea through the Agony to succeed her as leaders of the Sisterhood. Valya at first refuses, while Dorotea accepts and survives the ordeal.

=== Kasha Jinjo ===
Reverend Mother Kasha Jinjo, portrayed by Jihae, is Emperor Javicco's trusted Truthsayer. Kasha wields considerable influence over the Emperor, as well as his daughter, Princess Ynez. She has groomed Ynez from childhood to be trained at the Sisterhood School, and the women share a mother-daughter dynamic. This relationship challenges Kasha's loyalty to the Sisterhood and their plans.

In "The Hidden Hand", Kasha is at Emperor Javicco's side during his final negotiations with Duke Richese for the betrothal of Ynez to Pruwet Richese. Though she advises Javicco wisely and truthfully, Kasha's ultimate loyalty is to the Sisterhood and their plans. After meeting the mysterious Imperial soldier Desmond Hart, Kasha has unsettling visions that involve Ynez, and comes to believe that the marriage, orchestrated by Mother Superior Valya, should not proceed. Kasha travels from the capital world of Salusa Secundus to the Sisterhood School on Wallach IX to report her visions to Valya. Her decades-long plan nearing fruition, Valya dismisses Kasha's warnings. On Salusa Secundus, Desmond suggests to Javicco that the "witches" of the Sisterhood are keeping him in the dark about growing insurgency against him, but the Emperor insists that Kasha has never led him astray. Javicco voices his unease with Ynez's pending marriage. Desmond finds Pruwet and explains that there is a "war in plain sight" in that the Sisterhood has unacceptable influence over the Imperium. Desmond confesses that he has been given a "great power" by his near-death experience on Arrakis. Apologetically, he thanks Pruwet for his sacrifice and then psychically immolates the boy, an attack which simultaneously immolates Kasha on Wallach IX. Kasha's burned body reminds Valya of the former Mother Superior Raquella's deathbed prediction that Valya "will be the one to see the burning truth, and know."

Jihae was cast as Kasha in May 2024. Yerin Ha was later cast as the younger version of the character.

=== Francesca ===
Sister Francesca, portrayed by Tabu, is the Emperor's former lover and the mother of Constantine, as well as a powerful member of the Sisterhood, whose arrival at the palace "strains the balance of power in the capital." She is an imprinter, possessing the ability to use physical intimacy to influence someone else's body chemistry to ensure their loyalty. In her youth, Francesca was commanded by Valya to imprint Javicco Corrino, but in doing so Francesca also developed deep feelings for him.

In "The Hidden Hand", Francesca is one of young Valya's friends and followers in the wake of Mother Superior Raquella's death.

Tabu was cast as Francesca in May 2024. Charithra Chandran was later cast as the younger version of the character. Brian Tallerico of The A.V. Club wrote of Tabu, a "legendary" Bollywood actress, "Her casting here adds some gravity to a show that needs it."

== Guest ==
=== Raquella Berto-Anirul ===
Mother Superior Raquella Berto-Anirul, portrayed by Cathy Tyson, is the founder and leader of the Sisterhood. She has created a network of influence by placing her Truthsayers, loyal to the Sisterhood, as trusted advisors to the Great Houses. Raquella has also devised a secret breeding program intended to guide noble bloodlines to cultivate better, more easily controlled leaders.

In "The Hidden Hand", a dying Raquella tells young Valya Harkonnen that she must grow, protect and strengthen the Sisterhood, and that Valya "will be the one to see the burning truth, and know." Raquella's granddaughter Dorotea intends to destroy the breeding program as something heretical and impure, so Valya uses the Voice to force Dorotea to kill herself. Thirty years later, Valya is Mother Superior, and has grown the Sisterhood in size and power. She has arranged for the future Empress, Princess Ynez, to be trained by the Sisterhood, and has orchestrated a union for Ynez which will stabilize the Imperial bloodline for generations. Suddenly, Imperial Truthsayer Kasha Jinjo has unsettling visions and warns against the marriage, but Valya persists. Mysterious Imperial soldier Desmond Hart, who perceives the Sisterhood as a growing threat to the autonomy of the Imperium, uses a "great power" granted to him by his near-death experience on Arrakis to psychically immolate Ynez's betrothed, Pruwet Richese. The attack simultaneously immolates Kasha, whose burned body reminds Valya of Raquella's dying prediction.

In "Two Wolves", Sister Lila is revealed to be Raquella's great-great-granddaughter. With the Sisterhood desperate for more information about the dangerous prophecy which is now unfolding, Lila undergoes the dangerous Agony ritual to unlock her Other Memory and access Raquella's consciousness. Raquella speaks through her, providing more details about the prophecy that point to Desmond as the key to a coming reckoning. "Sisterhood Above All" depicts Raquella meeting and taking Valya under her wing, eventually sharing with her the secret of the forbidden technology used to maintain her vast DNA database. Recognizing that her life is waning, Raquella intends to put Valya and Dorotea through the Agony to succeed her as leaders of the Sisterhood. Valya at first refuses, and Raquella issues the ultimatum that she take care of her family issues and return as a Reverend Mother, or not at all. Once Valya is sure that her brother Griffin's death has been avenged, she self-administers the Rossak drug and survives.

=== Ferdinand Richese ===
Duke Ferdinand Richese, portrayed by Brendan Cowell, is a key military ally to Emperor Javicco Corrino.

In "The Hidden Hand", Ferdinand's nine-year-old son, Pruwet, is betrothed to Javicco's adult daughter and heir, Princess Ynez. The match is predicated on Javicco's need for Richese ships to maintain his control of the planet Arrakis, only source of the all-important spice. Javicco and Ferdinand's Truthsayers, loyal to the Sisterhood, are aware that the Duke hopes to ultimately secure Arrakis for himself, but the Sisterhood's immediate goal is to cement the marriage for their own purposes, and then deal with Ferdinand later. Already displeased with the engagement, Empress Natalya is horrified by Pruwet's possession of forbidden technology in the form of a robotic toy lizard, and Ferdinand's flippant acceptance of it. She angrily reminds the Duke that he only exists because the Corrinos defeated the thinking machines, and is shocked speechless when Javicco declares he will ignore the transgression for the evening.

=== Shannon Richese ===
Shannon Richese, portrayed by Tessa Bonham Jones, is the elder sister of Pruwet Richese, and the daughter of Duke Ferdinand Richese and his wife, Duchess Orla.

In "The Hidden Hand", Shannon arrives at the palace with her family for the betrothal of Pruwet to Emperor Javicco's daughter, Princess Ynez. In "Two Wolves", she has a sexual encounter with Javicco's illegitimate son, Constantine Corrino, during which she learns of Desmond Hart's connection to Pruwet's death. She informs her father, and the information spurs Ferdinand to threaten Javicco and reveal his disdain for him.

=== Pruwet Richese ===
Pruwet Richese, portrayed by Charlie Hodson-Prior, is the nine-year-old son and heir of Duke Ferdinand Richese.

In "The Hidden Hand", Pruwet has been betrothed to Emperor Javicco Corrino's adult daughter and heir, Princess Ynez. The match is predicated on Javicco's need for Richese ships to maintain his control of the planet Arrakis, only source of the all-important spice. Already displeased with the engagement, Empress Natalya is horrified by Pruwet's possession of forbidden technology in the form of a robotic toy lizard, and Ferdinand's flippant acceptance of it. Ynez tries to connect with her nine-year-old future husband during the engagement ceremony, but scolds him harshly after his possession of forbidden technology is revealed. Javicco indicates to Imperial soldier Desmond Hart that he is uneasy about the betrothal, and would be happy to be freed of it. Desmond finds Pruwet and explains that there is a "war in plain sight" in that the Sisterhood has unacceptable influence over the Imperium. Desmond confesses that he has been given a "great power" by his near-death experience on Arrakis. Apologetically, he thanks Pruwet for his sacrifice and then psychically immolates the boy.
