= Dune: Prophecy =

American television series

- Genre: Drama; Science fiction
- Based on: Great Schools of Dune by; Brian Herbert; Kevin J. Anderson; Dune by Frank Herbert
- Developed by: Diane Ademu-John; Alison Schapker
- Showrunner: Alison Schapker
- Starring: Emily Watson; Olivia Williams; Travis Fimmel; Jodhi May; Sarah-Sofie Boussnina; Chloe Lea; Chris Mason; Shalom Brune-Franklin; Mark Strong; Jade Anouka; Edward Davis; Josh Heuston; Faoileann Cunningham; Aoife Hinds; Mark Addy
- Music by: Volker Bertelmann
- Country of origin: United States
- Original language: English
- No. of seasons: 1
- No. of episodes: 6

Production
- Executive producers: Diane Ademu-John; Alison Schapker; Jon Spaihts; Scott Z. Burns; Matthew King; John Cameron; Brian Herbert; Byron Merritt; Kim Herbert; Jordan Goldberg; Mark Tobey; Anna Foerster; John Shiban
- Producers: Kevin J. Anderson; Bryan H. Carroll; Angela LaManna
- Production locations: Hungary; Jordan
- Cinematography: Pierre Gill
- Running time: 58–80 minutes
- Production companies: Wandering Jew Productions; Herbert Properties, Inc.; Flying Life; Legendary Television

Original release
- Network: HBO
- Release: November 17, 2024 – present

Dune: Prophecy is an American science fiction television series developed by Diane Ademu-John and Alison Schapker, with Schapker serving as showrunner and writer. Set in Frank Herbert's Dune universe, the series focuses on the origins of the Bene Gesserit, a powerful social, religious, and political force whose members possess superhuman powers and abilities after undergoing years of intense physical and mental conditioning. Dune: Prophecy is a prequel to the Denis Villeneuve films Dune (2021) and Dune: Part Two (2024), taking place approximately 10,000 years earlier. It draws upon, but is set after, the Great Schools of Dune novel trilogy (2012–2016) by Brian Herbert and Kevin J. Anderson.

During Legendary Entertainment's 2016 acquisition of the television and film rights to the Dune book series, it began development of a two-part film adaptation with Denis Villeneuve serving as director by 2017. Legendary Television ordered the series in 2019 as a spin-off project from Villeneuve's films. Various creative figures joined by 2019, and following creative overhauls, Schapker became the show-runner with Anna Foerster as director for multiple episodes by June 2023. Meanwhile, casting took place from November 2022 to June 2023. Principal photography began in November 2022 in Budapest and Jordan, and wrapped in December 2023.

Dune: Prophecy premiered on HBO on November 17, 2024, to mixed reviews from critics. In December 2024, the series was renewed for a second season, which is set to premiere in 2026.

== Plot ==
Set 10,000 years before the events of Dune, the series commences 80 years after an alliance of humans defeated the thinking machine armies that had nearly exterminated them. Sisters Valya and Tula Harkonnen struggle to maintain the power and influence of the Sisterhood, and combat forces that threaten the future of humanity.

The story sheds light on the origins of the Sisterhood (later known as the Bene Gesserit), their rise to power and influence in the Imperium, as well as their personal struggles, conflicts, and battle against a prophesied enemy, while at the same time delving into key historical aspects of the Dune universe, such as the roots of the Harkonnen and Atreides families.

== Cast and characters ==
=== Main ===
- Emily Watson as Mother Superior Valya Harkonnen, leader of the Sisterhood
  - Jessica Barden as Young Valya, an ambitious, stubborn, and forceful woman who "dreams of restoring her family's noble status."
- Olivia Williams as Reverend Mother Tula Harkonnen, Valya's biological sister and close ally.
  - Emma Canning as Young Tula
- Travis Fimmel as Desmond Hart, "a charismatic soldier with an enigmatic past, who seeks to gain the Emperor's trust at the expense of the Sisterhood."
- Jodhi May as Empress Natalya, "a formidable royal who united thousands of worlds in her marriage to Emperor [Javicco] Corrino."
- Sarah-Sofie Boussnina as Princess Ynez, "an independent young princess dealing with the pressures of her responsibility as heir to the Golden Lion Throne."
- Chloe Lea as Sister Lila, "the youngest acolyte at the Sisterhood School with a deep empathy beyond her years."
- Chris Mason as Keiran Atreides, Swordmaster of House Corrino
- Shalom Brune-Franklin as Mikaela, "a strong-willed Fremen woman who serves the royal family while longing for a home planet she's never known."
- Mark Strong as Padishah Emperor Javicco Corrino, "a man from a great line of war-time Emperors, who is called upon to govern the Imperium and manage a fragile peace."
- Jade Anouka as Sister Theodosia, "a talented and ambitious acolyte at the Sisterhood who harbors a dangerous secret about her past."
- Edward Davis as Harrow Harkonnen, a "rising politician from a once-great family, who harbors a strong desire to elevate his House to its former glory."
- Josh Heuston as Constantine Corrino, the illegitimate son of Javicco who is "torn between seeking his father's approval and his own happiness."
- Faoileann Cunningham as Sister Jen, "a fierce, unpredictable acolyte in training at the Sisterhood School who rarely reveals her emotional core."
- Aoife Hinds as Sister Emeline, "a zealous acolyte descended from a long line of martyrs, who carries fervent religion to her training at the Sisterhood."
- Mark Addy as Evgeny Harkonnen, Valya and Tula's uncle

=== Recurring ===
- Barbara Marten as Sister Avila, an aide to Valya and Tula
  - Sarah Oliver-Watts as Young Avila, one of Dorotea's followers
- Camilla Beeput as Reverend Mother Dorotea, a pious Reverend Mother and Raquella's granddaughter
- Jihae as Reverend Mother Kasha Jinjo, the Emperor's Truthsayer, whose loyalty to the Sisterhood is challenged
  - Yerin Ha as Young Kasha
- Tabu as Sister Francesca, a powerful Sister, the Emperor's former lover and Constantine's mother, whose return to the palace "strains the balance of power in the capital."
  - Charithra Chandran as Young Francesca

=== Guest ===
- Cathy Tyson as Mother Superior Raquella Berto-Anirul, founder of the Sisterhood
- Brendan Cowell as Duke Ferdinand Richese
- Hannah Khalique-Brown as Sister Farouz, an acolyte with an eye for Constantine Corrino
- Flora Montgomery as Reverend Mother Vera, Truthsayer of House Richese
- Laura Howard as Duchess Orla Richese
- Tessa Bonham Jones as Lady Shannon Richese
- Charlie Hodson-Prior as Lord Pruwet Richese
- Sam Spruell as Horace, a member of a rebellion against the Great Houses
- Karima McAdams as Sister Nazir, a Suk doctor previously trained by the Sisterhood
- Polly Walker as Sonia Harkonnen, Valya and Tula's mother
- Earl Cave as Griffin Harkonnen, Valya and Tula's brother
- Milo Callaghan as Orry Atreides
- David Bark-Jones as Vergyl Harkonnen, Valya and Tula's father
- Archie Barnes as Albert, the only survivor of Tula's massacre of the Atreides
- Tanya Moodie as the Voice of Anirul, the Sisterhood's secret artificial intelligence
- Lucy Russell as the Truthsayer of House Gbangbala
- Sarah Lam as the Truthsayer of House Hagal
- Nicola Alexis as the Truthsayer of House Yaofirks

== Episodes ==
No.	Title	Directed by	Written by	Original release date	U.S. viewers (millions)
1	"The Hidden Hand"	Anna Foerster	Diane Ademu-John	November 17, 2024	0.205
Over 10,000 years before the events of Dune, sisters Valya and Tula Harkonnen join the Sisterhood, an order of women trained to serve the Great Houses of the Imperium as Truthsayers. Mother Superior Raquella Berto-Anirul dies after envisioning a future reckoning (Tiran-Arafel), which she dubs the Burning Truth. Valya uses the Voice to force Dorotea, Raquella's granddaughter/successor, to kill herself before she can destroy the Sisterhood's breeding program. Thirty years later, Valya, now Mother Superior, arranges for Princess Ynez, daughter of Emperor Javicco Corrino, to marry nine-year-old Pruwet Richese, which they expect will stabilize the Corrino bloodline for generations to come while strengthening their control of desert planet Arrakis and its invaluable spice. Imperial Truthsayer Kasha Jinjo has unsettling visions after meeting soldier Desmond Hart, who claims Imperium-based insurgents, and not the native Fremen, were responsible for the ambush that wiped out his regiment. Valya dismisses Kasha's concerns. Visiting a nightclub, Ynez has sex with Imperial Swordmaster Keiran Atreides. Following a conversation with Javicco that reveals his unease with Ynez's marriage, Desmond meets with Pruwet and uses a "great power" to immolate him, an attack that simultaneously immolates Kasha. Seeing Kasha's burning body prompts Valya to recall Raquella's vision.
2	"Two Wolves"	John Cameron	Elizabeth Padden and Kor Adana	November 24, 2024	0.142
After Kasha's inconclusive autopsy, Valya leaves with Theodosia to secure Princess Ynez. Empress Natalya angers Duke Ferdinand by claiming Pruwet's death is accidental. Desmond, who claims a sandworm swallowed him, tells Javicco he killed Pruwet for him. Javicco has him arrested, but Natalya suggests they use Desmond. Valya has Tula put her protégée, Raquella's great-great-granddaughter Lila, through the Agony ritual to unlock her Other Memory and contact Raquella. Lila learns of a "revenant", envisions Valya killing her grandmother Dorotea, becomes overwhelmed, and seemingly dies. Constantine has sex with Shannon Richese and reveals Desmond's involvement in Pruwet's murder. Valya brings news of Kasha's death, agonizing Ynez, and interrogates Desmond, who again admits both murders; Javicco eschews prosecution. Keiran, a clandestine anti-imperial insurgent, copies the palace layout for the rebels and Ynez recounts how rebels once kidnapped her and Constantine. Ferdinand threatens Javicco and Desmond burns him as a warning. Valya acquires from her spy, Division bartender Sister Mikaela, a list of Arrakis rebels the Sisterhood secretly supports, saying she may surrender them to bolster Javicco. Desmond confronts Valya, saying he intends to destroy the Sisterhood. She employs the Voice to compel him to commit suicide but he successfully resists; Valya retreats.
3	"Sisterhood Above All"	Richard J. Lewis	Monica Owusu-Breen and Jordan Goldberg	December 1, 2024	0.137
In the past, Valya advocates revenge on the Atreides for House Harkonnen's banishment. Her brother Griffin joins the Landsraad, seeking commercial privileges, but dies, allegedly murdered by Vorian Atreides. Valya joins the Sisterhood, and Tula, hiding her Harkonnen identity, visits lover Orry Atreides' Caladan bull-hunt. Dorotea criticizes Valya for questioning if Sisters can withhold truth from rulers, and for being without loyalties. At a rainy vow-taking ceremony, Valya refuses to put the Sisterhood first. She uses the Voice on Raquella, impressing her. Orry proposes to Tula; she accepts, and they have sex. Next morning, Tula has slaughtered his family, and kills him too, avenging Griffin. Raquella shows Valya her ambitious DNA database using forbidden technology. When Dorotea and Valya are to undergo the Agony, the latter refuses; one of Dorotea's followers calls her coward. Raquella remands Valya to Lankiveil, telling her to return as a Reverend Mother or not at all. During a tense exchange, Valya employs the Voice on her mother. She later puts herself through Agony, surviving; Tula joins her in the Sisterhood. In the present, Valya visits her family as a recourse; Tula pretends to euthanize a comatose Lila but connects her to a thinking/life-support machine.
4	"Twice Born"	Richard J. Lewis	Kevin Lau & Suzanne Wrubel	December 8, 2024	0.132
Jen discovers other Sisters' nightmares, preventing Emeline's suicide. Valya becomes the Harkonnens' truthsayer. Ynez hears Desmond's murder confession. Desmond unsuccessfully recommends Javicco remove the Landsraad's Truthsayers. Keiran and Horace acquire an Ixian flying thermal bomb to kill Javicco, telling Mikaela. Valya hears, revealing she plans to save Javicco, and turn over Keiran. Sisters reveal Pruwet's murder to various Houses, which invite Harrow to replace the departed Richeses on the High Council and investigate. Tula has spice-imbibing acolytes draw images from their dreams: Shai-Hulud and blue eyes. Natalya reveals she leaked the truth about Pruwet's murder, so Javicco could prosecute thinking-machine abusers. At Division, Ynez recalls Vorian refused the throne, and tells Keiran of Desmond's guilt, volunteering to act. Harrow tells the Landsraad kanly was violated, almost naming the Corrinos; but Ynez accuses Desmond, who brings in Horace, bound. Desmond concurs but calls it a legal execution, flourishing the bomb. Javicco lets him immolate Horace and his co-conspirators. Valya obtains a sample of wounded Desmond's blood. Tula dreams she kills Emeline, who knows her crimes; Lila wakes. Evgeny laments Valya warping her siblings; criticizing his weakness, she withholds his respirator, killing him. Theodosia is revealed as a shapeshifter; Valya has her appear as Griffin.
5	"In Blood, Truth"	Anna Foerster	Carlito Rodriguez & Leah Benavides Rodriguez	December 15, 2024	0.150
Javicco makes Desmond an elite regiment's Bashar. Sister Francesca arrives to see Constantine, her son. Jen, trusted for her nightmare-resistance, is shown the ailing Lila. Harrow apologizes to Desmond for challenging Javicco, and blames Valya. Desmond wants proof of her complicity in rebel spice-smuggling. Harrow reports his meeting to Valya. Valya wants Francesca to assuage Javicco, and have Ynez study on Wallach IX. Raquella, possessing Lila, applauds Valya's efforts. Francesca tells Javicco to give Constantine responsibility; Javicco kisses her. Lila isolates a virus that killed Kasha; Avila, stunned, discovers Lila. Desmond's troops find spice at the Division; Keiran and Mikaela kill some. Keiran sees her Sisterhood knife, and warns her to avoid him. Desmond awakens after Mikaela's chain detonators explode the Division. Francesca says she had Constantine to protect Ynez. Valya gives Mikaela safe passage to Arrakis; Mikaela feels exploited. Constantine discovers Keiran's palace map, and smilingly betrays him to Desmond. Javicco makes Constantine fleet commander, tasked to pacify Arrakis. Ynez interrogates Keiran, who pledges to improve the Imperium. Tula is shocked to discover that Desmond has Atreides and Harkonnen blood; on Salusa Secundus, Desmond tells Natalya that his mother was a Sister, who left him to scavengers. Natalya complains to Desmond that the Sisterhood stole her power and her daughter, then kisses him.
6	"The High-Handed Enemy"	Anna Foerster	Elizabeth Padden & Suzanne Wrubel	December 22, 2024	0.162
In flashback, Tula sees Valya order Dorotea's suicide, then reveals her pregnancy. Valya shows Tula Anirul, and plans mating Javicco to Natalya. After birthing Desmond, Tula exchanges him for a stillborn. In the present, Nazir tells Tula fear feeds the virus, but dies analyzing it. Natalya arrests Ynez for attempting Keiran's rescue. Valya gives Francesca a poison needle to kill Javicco. Javicco unsuccessfully tries to send Natalya away. Javicco begs Valya's assistance against Desmond. She reveals the Sisterhood manipulated his whole life; he has her arrested. Dorotea-possessed Lila reveals Valya made Dorotea's followers commit suicide. Francesca shows angry Javicco the needle, blaming Valya. Valya frees Ynez and Keiran; they flee; Theodosia poses as Ynez, then a guard, stabbing Desmond. Javicco threatens Francesca, but, despairing, stabs himself. Natalya kills Francesca with the needle. Lila shows the acolytes Dorotea's followers' skeletons, then destroys Anirul. Harrow recovers a recording device he used to spy on Valya. Desmond ignites Valya's virus; Tula helps her to survive by abandoning fear. Valya senses an unknown person had a blue-"eyed" machine forcibly implant technology in Desmond. She considers killing Desmond, but Tula reveals his parentage. Valya says some hidden hand, grasping for control, also realized Desmond's potential. Tula embraces Desmond; his guards arrest her. Valya, Keiran, and Ynez land on Arrakis.

== Production ==
=== Development ===
In November 2016, Legendary Entertainment had acquired the film and television rights for the 1965 novel Dune by Frank Herbert from his estate. Legendary eventually contacted Denis Villeneuve to direct a two-part film adaptation of the novel by the next month, and was confirmed as director by February 2017. Legendary Television announced a full series order of Dune: The Sisterhood in June 2019, produced for WarnerMedia's then-unnamed streaming service. The series would focus on the Bene Gesserit order and serve as a prequel to Villeneuve's 2021 film Dune, based on material from Dune and the 2012 prequel novel Sisterhood of Dune by Brian Herbert and Kevin J. Anderson. Villeneuve was set to direct and produce the series' pilot with Jon Spaihts writing the screenplay. Both would serve as executive producers alongside Byron Merritt, Kim Herbert, Kevin J. Anderson, and Herbert's son, Brian. Villeneuve said, "The Bene Gesserit have always been fascinating to me. Focusing a series around that powerful order of women seemed not only relevant and inspiring but a dynamic setting for the television series."

Shortly after its announcement, the project received criticism for its lack of female creatives except for Herbert's granddaughter, Kim Herbert. Dana Calvo was hired in July 2019 to serve as showrunner alongside Spaihts. In November 2019, Spaihts left the series to focus on Dune: Part Two (2024). The Hollywood Reporter reported that Legendary Television was "not happy" with Spaihts's early work as showrunner and opted to remove him. Diane Ademu-John had been hired as the new showrunner by July 2021. As production of Dune: Part Two progressed, Villeneuve was no longer able to direct and was replaced by Johan Renck as director for the first two episodes in April 2022. Shortly after production began, Diane Ademu-John had exited the project as co-showrunner but remained the executive producer; this left Alison Schapker as the sole showrunner. In February 2023, Renck also exited the project, resulting in the project being on hiatus. He was replaced that June by Anna Foerster, who would direct multiple episodes, including the pilot. In November 2023, the series was retitled Dune: Prophecy and set to release on Warner Bros. Discovery's streaming service, Max. In November 2024, Schapker explained that the series would explore multiple time periods, with the characters' pasts adapted from the Great Schools of Dune novel trilogy, and the present timeline original to the television series. In December 2024, HBO renewed the series for a second season.

=== Casting ===
In October 2022, Emily Watson, Shirley Henderson, Indira Varma, Sarah-Sofie Boussnina, Shalom Brune-Franklin, Faoileann Cunningham, Aoife Hinds, and Chloe Lea were cast to star in the series. Travis Fimmel joined the cast the following month. On December 1, 2022, Mark Strong, Jade Anouka, and Chris Mason joined the cast in starring roles. Josh Heuston and Edward Davis would join in recurring roles later that month. During Renck's exit in February 2023, Henderson had also left. In June, Olivia Williams was cast to replace Henderson, with Jodhi May cast to replace Varma, who exited the series due to scheduling conflicts. In May 2024, it was announced that Tabu had joined the cast of the series as Sister Francesca, Jihae was cast as Reverend Mother Kasha, the Emperor's Truthsayer, and Jessica Barden was cast as the younger version of Valya. The younger versions of Tula, Francesca and Kasha are portrayed by Emma Canning, Charithra Chandran and Yerin Ha, respectively. Mark Addy plays Evgeny Harkonnen, Valya and Tula's uncle.

In November 2025, Indira Varma, Ashley Walters, and Tom Hollander were announced to have joined the cast for the second season.

=== Filming ===
The series was originally scheduled to start filming on November 2, 2020, in Budapest and Jordan. It began production on November 22, 2022, under the working title Dune: The Sisterhood, with Renck confirming the start on his Instagram account. In July 2023, Deadline Hollywood reported that, following a winter hiatus, production was set to resume in Budapest amidst the WGA and SAG strikes due to the series' talent working under the UK-based union Equity. Filming had concluded by December 2023, with Pierre Gill having served as lead cinematographer. Gill did not use the StageCraft virtual production technology, which he had previously utilized in the television series Percy Jackson and the Olympians, as the production primarily relied on practical sets and production values.

Principal photography for the second season began in November 2025 in Hungary, Jordan, and Spain and concluded on March 21, 2026.

=== Music ===
Jónsi was originally hired to compose the show's score. However, by October 2023, Volker Bertelmann was set to compose the score for the series.

=== Marketing ===
Max released a teaser trailer for the series on May 15, 2024. A second teaser was released on July 18, 2024. On October 17, 2024, the official trailer was unveiled during a panel at New York Comic Con.

== Release ==
Originally announced to premiere on the streaming service Max, Dune: Prophecy was rebranded as an HBO Original in July 2024. The first season premiered on HBO and Max on November 17, 2024. It was released on DVD, Blu-ray, and UHD Blu-ray in May 2025. The second season is set to premiere in 2026.

== Reception ==
The review aggregator website Rotten Tomatoes reported a 65% approval rating with an average rating of 6.4/10, based on 98 critic reviews. The website's critics consensus reads, "Grounded by reliably terrific performances from Emily Watson and Olivia Williams, Dune: Prophecy lacks the spice of Denis Villeneuve's films but compensates with addictively perilous palace intrigue." Metacritic, which uses a weighted average, assigned a score of 64 out of 100 based on 34 critics, indicating "generally favorable" reviews.

The premiere of Dune: Prophecy drew 1.2 million U.S. viewers across platforms, with the audience growing another 75% the following day, bringing the total to 2.1 million viewers.

As of December 19, 2024, the number of viewers surpassed 10 million, when "according to HBO, the premiere episode of the series raked in about 15 million viewers across Max's covered territories".

=== Awards and nominations ===
Award	Year	Category	Nominee(s)	Result	Ref.
Art Directors Guild Awards	2025	Excellence in Production Design for a One-Hour Fantasy Single-Camera Series	Tom Meyer (for "The Hidden Hand")	Nominated	
Canadian Society of Cinematographers Awards	2025	Dramatic Series Cinematography	Pierre Gill (for "In Blood, Truth")	Nominated	
Costume Designers Guild Awards	2025	Excellence in Sci-Fi/Fantasy Television	Bojana Nikitović (for "The Hidden Hand")	Won	
Critics' Choice Super Awards	2025	Best Science Fiction/Fantasy Series, Limited Series or Made-for-TV Movie	Dune: Prophecy	Nominated	
Golden Trailer Awards	2025	Best Fantasy Adventure (Trailer/Teaser) – TV/Streaming Series	HBO / Concept Arts (for "Power")	Nominated	
Gotham TV Awards	2025	Outstanding Supporting Performance in a Drama Series	Olivia Williams	Nominated	
Primetime Creative Arts Emmy Awards	2025	Outstanding Fantasy/Sci-Fi Costumes	Bojana Nikitović, Gábor Homonnay, and Srdjan Perić (for "The Hidden Hand")	Nominated	
Primetime Creative Arts Emmy Awards	2025	Outstanding Original Main Title Theme Music	Volker Bertelmann	Nominated	
Primetime Creative Arts Emmy Awards	2025	Outstanding Production Design for a Narrative Period or Fantasy Program (One Hour or More)	Tom Meyer, Guy Potgieter, and Carolyn Loucks (for "The Hidden Hand")	Nominated	
Primetime Creative Arts Emmy Awards	2025	Outstanding Special Visual Effects in a Season or Movie	Terron Pratt, Michael Enriquez, Brennan Prevatt, Martyn Culpitt, Philip Engstrom, Peter Lames, Julien Hery, Vincent Poitras, and Jed Glassford	Nominated	
Set Decorators Society of America Awards	2025	Best Achievement in Décor/Design of a One Hour Fantasy or Science Fiction Series	Carolyn Loucks, Roxana Balogh, and Tom Meyer	Nominated	
Visual Effects Society Awards	2025	Outstanding Created Environment in an Episode, Commercial, Game Cinematic, or Real-Time Project	Scott Coates, Sam Besseau, Vincent l'Heureux, and Lourenco Abreu (for "The Hidden Hand"; Imperial Palace)	Nominated	
Visual Effects Society Awards	2025	Outstanding Created Environment in an Episode, Commercial, Game Cinematic, or Real-Time Project	Nils Weisbrod, David Anastacio, Rene Borst, and Ruben Valente (for "Two Wolves"; Zimia Spaceport)	Nominated	
