= Emma Canning =

Irish actress

- Education: Guildhall School of Music & Drama
- Occupation: Actress
- Years active: 2021–present

Emma Canning is an Irish actress. Her television roles include a young Tula Harkonnen in Dune: Prophecy (2024).

== Early life ==
She graduated from the Guildhall School of Music & Drama in 2019.

== Career ==
Her first professional screen role was as Isabelle, a maid within a wealthy household, in the supernatural series The Irregulars. She also had an early role appearing as Young Antonia in the Roman-era historical drama television series Domina.

In 2022, she played Judy Sears in the Alice Childress play Trouble in Mind at the Royal National Theatre’s Dorfman Theatre. Her stage roles have also included a production of Tennessee Williams play The Night of the Iguana at the Noël Coward Theatre alongside Clive Owen and Anna Gunn.

In 2024, she played Helen in Apple TV+ war drama Masters of the Air, and Kathleen in Disney+ historical drama series Say Nothing set in Northern Ireland during The Troubles. She also has a role in action thriller television series Citadel: Honey Bunny. She played the younger version of Elsa Lombardi (played by Emily Mortimer) in Apple TV+ World War Two biographical fashion drama The New Look which centres on the fashion houses of Coco Chanel and Christian Dior.

In late 2024, she appeared as Young Tula in fantasy drama series adaptation Dune: Prophecy, playing the younger version of the character Tula Harkonnen, played by Olivia Williams. In 2025, she appeared in the film The History of Sound, which was nominated for the Palme d'Or prize at the 2025 Cannes Film Festival.

In 2026, Canning appeared as a teenage Greta in How to Get to Heaven from Belfast.

== Filmography ==
=== Film ===
Year	Title	Role	Notes
2025	The History of Sound	Clarissa Roux	

=== Television ===
Year	Title	Role	Notes
2021	The Irregulars	Isabelle	1 episode
2021	Domina	Young Antonia	5 episodes
2024	Masters of the Air	Helen	Miniseries, 3 episodes
2024	The New Look	Young Elsa	1 episode
2024	Say Nothing	Kathleen	Miniseries, 2 episodes
2024	Dune: Prophecy	Young Tula	3 episodes
2026	How to Get to Heaven from Belfast	Young Greta	
