= Navigators of Dune =

2016 novel set in the Dune universe by Brian Herbert and Kevin J. Anderson

- First edition cover
- Authors: Brian Herbert; Kevin J. Anderson
- Audio read by: Scott Brick
- Language: English
- Series: Great Schools of Dune
- Genre: Science fiction
- Publisher: Tor Books
- Publication date: September 13, 2016
- Publication place: United States
- Media type: Print (hardcover)
- Pages: 448
- ISBN: 978-0-7653-8125-5
- OCLC: 918994424
- Dewey Decimal: 813.54
- Preceded by: Mentats of Dune
- Followed by: Dune: The Duke of Caladan

Navigators of Dune is a 2016 science fiction novel by Brian Herbert and Kevin J. Anderson, set in the Dune universe created by Frank Herbert. It is the third book in their Great Schools of Dune prequel trilogy, which itself is a sequel to their Legends of Dune trilogy.

== Background ==
Set nearly a century after the events of 2004's Dune: The Battle of Corrin, the novel continues to chronicle the beginnings of the Bene Gesserit, Mentat and Suk Schools, as well as the Spacing Guild, all of which are threatened by the independent anti-technology forces gaining power in the aftermath of the Butlerian Jihad. The Great Schools of Dune trilogy, first mentioned by Anderson in a 2010 blog post, chronicles the early years of these organizations, which figure prominently in the original Dune novels.

In a 2009 interview Anderson stated that the third and final novel would be titled The Swordmasters of Dune, but by 2014 it had been renamed Navigators of Dune. On July 27, 2015, Anderson previewed the cover of Navigators of Dune on Twitter and noted its 2016 release. The novel was published on September 13, 2016.

A prequel short story called "Dune: Red Plague" was released on Tor.com on November 1, 2016.
