= Olivia Williams =

British actress (born 1968)

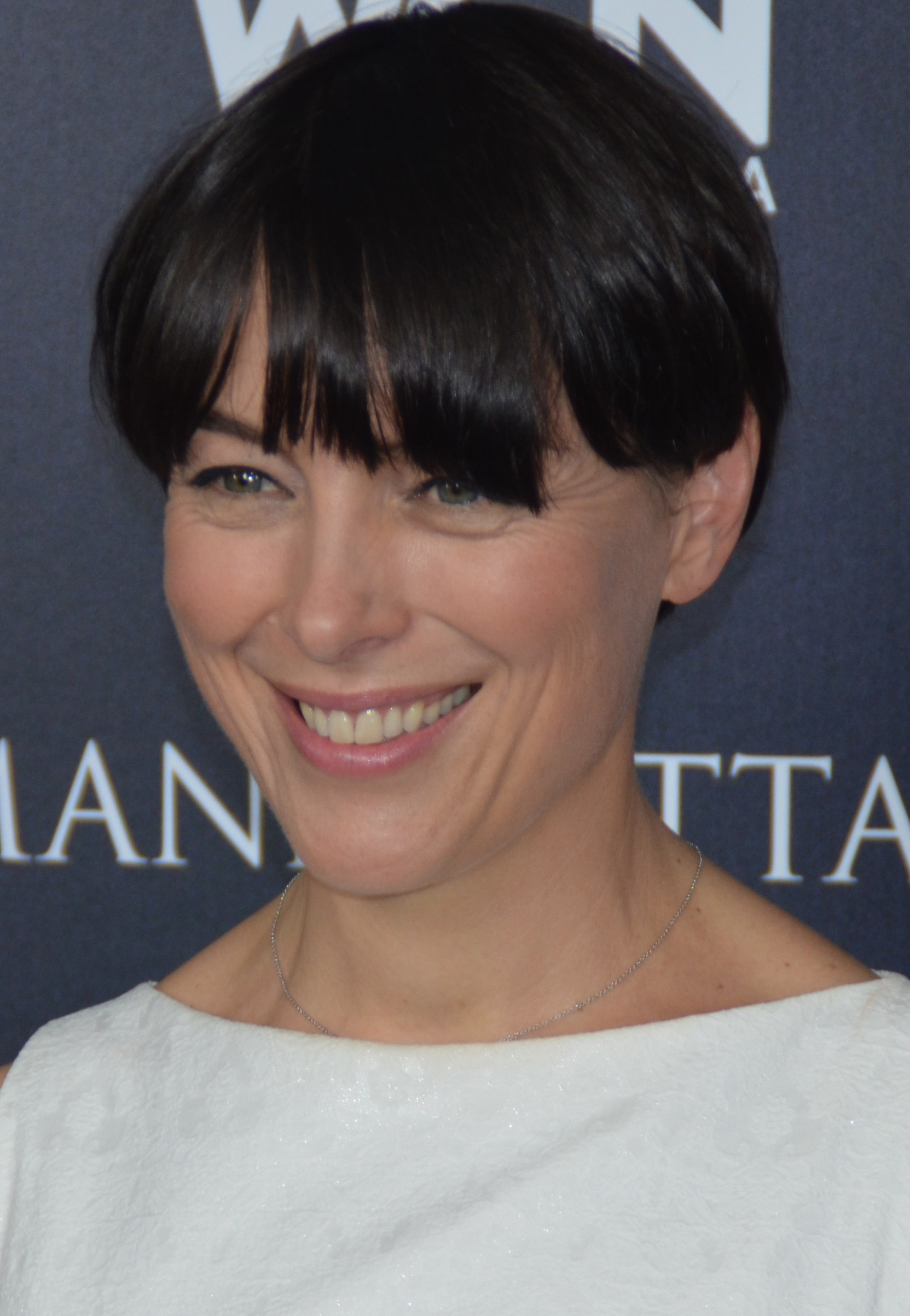
- Williams in 2014
- Born: Olivia Haigh Williams; 26 July 1968 (age 58); London, England
- Education: Newnham College, Cambridge; Bristol Old Vic Theatre School
- Occupation: Actress
- Years active: 1992–present
- Spouse: Rhashan Stone (m. 2003)
- Children: 2

Olivia Haigh Williams (born 26 July 1968) is an English actress who appears in British and American films and television. Williams studied drama at the Bristol Old Vic Theatre School for two years followed by three years at the Royal Shakespeare Company. Her first significant screen role was as Jane Fairfax in the British television film Emma (1996), based on Jane Austen's novel.

Williams made her film debut in 1997's The Postman, followed by Rushmore (1998) and The Sixth Sense (1999). She then acted in the British films Lucky Break (2001), The Heart of Me (2002), and An Education (2009). She next had roles in the films The Ghost Writer (2010), Hanna (2011), Anna Karenina (2012), Hyde Park on Hudson (2012), Sabotage (2014), Maps to the Stars (2014), Victoria & Abdul (2017), and The Father (2020).

From 2017 to 2019, Williams played Emily Silk in the science fiction television series Counterpart. In 2022 and 2023, she portrayed Camilla Parker Bowles in the final two seasons of Netflix's historical drama The Crown.

== Early life ==
Williams was born in North London. Both her parents are barristers.

Williams was educated at South Hampstead High School, an independent school for girls in Hampstead in north London, and Newnham College, Cambridge, where she graduated with a degree in English literature. She then studied drama at the Bristol Old Vic Theatre School for two years and spent three years at the Royal Shakespeare Company.

== Career ==
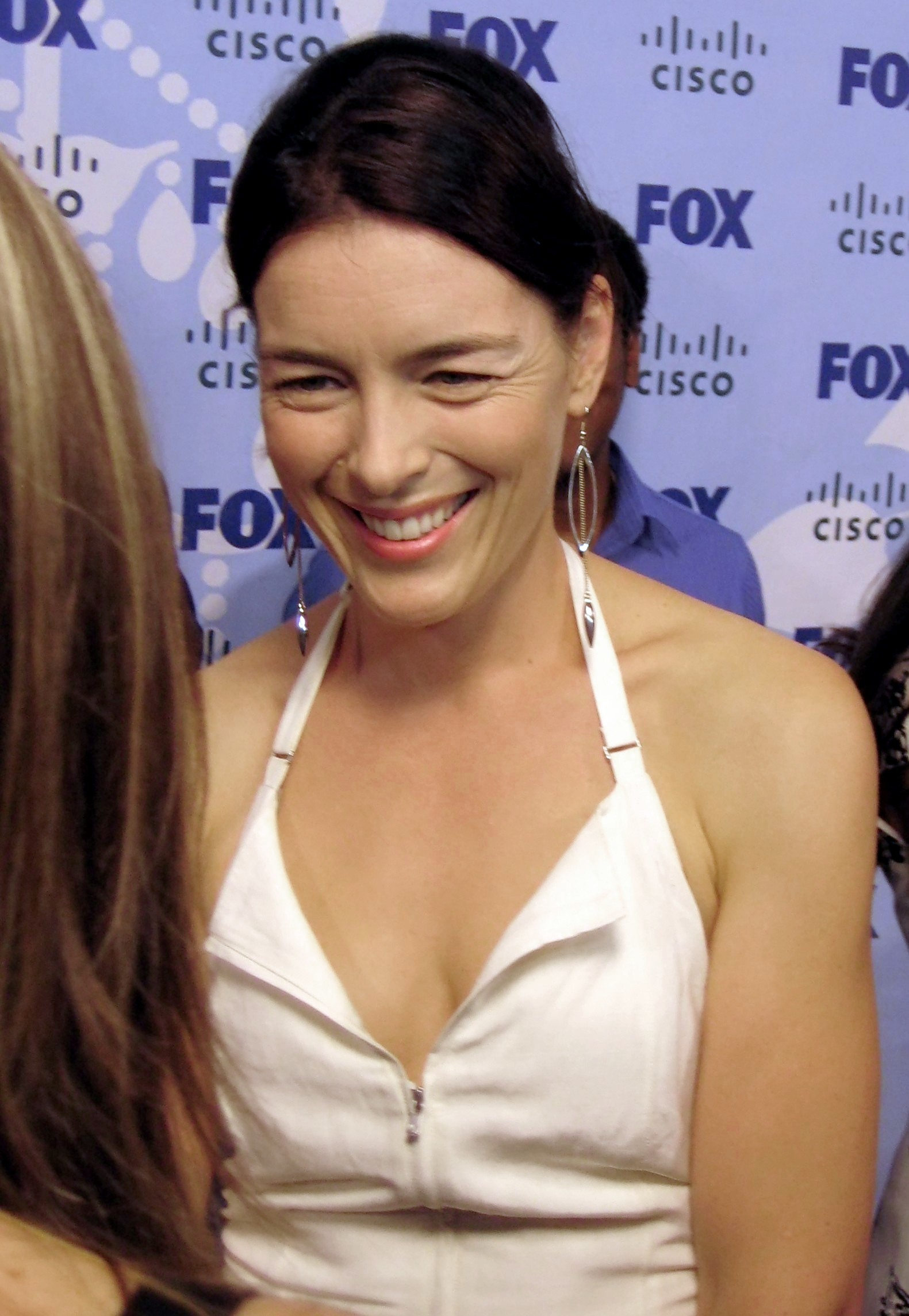
Olivia Williams at the Fox Fall Eco-Casino Party (2008)

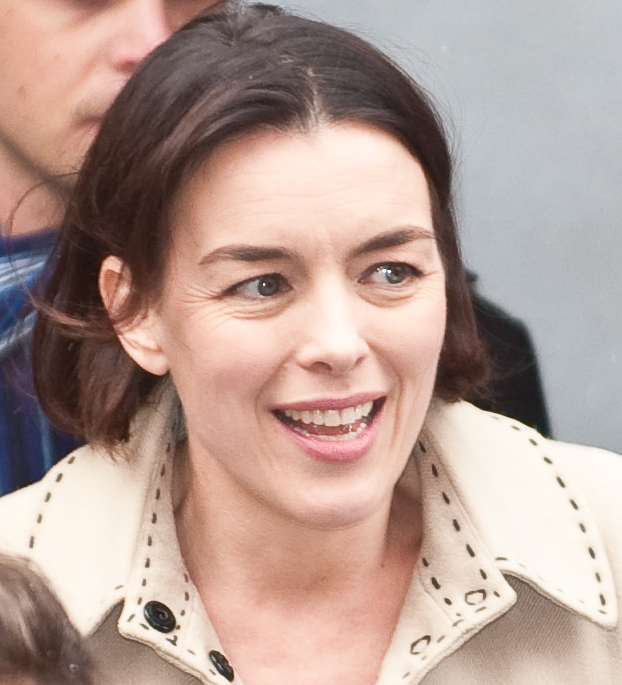
Williams at the 60th Berlin International Film Festival (2010)

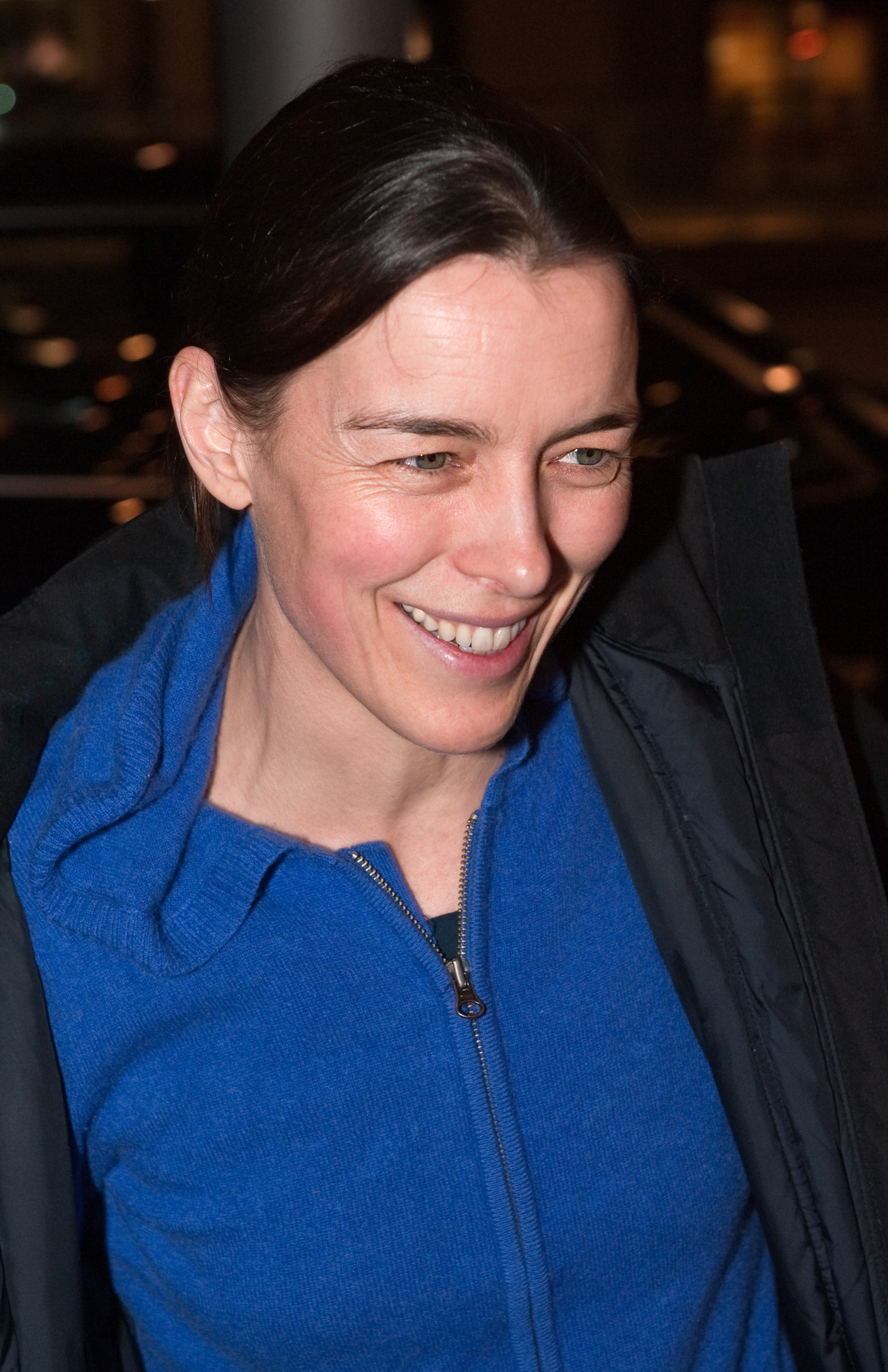
Williams at the Berlin Film Festival (2010)

After graduation, Williams worked with the Royal Shakespeare Company in both Stratford-upon-Avon and London. In 1995, she toured the United States in the National Theatre production of Shakespeare's Richard III starring Ian McKellen. Her first significant appearance before the cameras was as Jane Fairfax in the British TV film Emma (1996), based on Jane Austen's 1816 novel.

Williams made her film debut in the 1997 movie The Postman, after doing a screen test for Kevin Costner. She later won the lead role of Rosemary Cross in Wes Anderson's Rushmore (1998). She then starred as Bruce Willis' wife in the blockbuster The Sixth Sense (1999), a film she would later parody during her brief appearance in the British sitcom Spaced.

In 2000, Williams wrote the short story "The Significance of Hair" for BBC Radio and read it on the air.

Since 2001, Williams has appeared in several British films, including Lucky Break (2001), The Heart of Me (2002), for which she won the British Independent Film Award for Best Actress, and An Education (2009). She played Mrs. Darling in the 2003 film adaptation of Peter Pan. Williams was uncredited for her role as Dr. Moira MacTaggert in the 2006 film X-Men: The Last Stand.

On TV, Williams portrayed British author Jane Austen in Miss Austen Regrets (2008) and was cast as Adelle DeWitt in Joss Whedon's Dollhouse, which ran on Fox from 2009 to 2010.

In 2010, Williams won acclaim for her performance as Ruth Lang in Roman Polanski's The Ghost Writer, winning the National Society of Film Critics Award, London Critics Circle Film Award for best supporting actress and was runner-up for best supporting actress at the Los Angeles Film Critics Association Awards 2010.

In Hanna (2011), Williams played Rachel, a bohemian mother travelling across North Africa and Europe, who comes into contact with the eponymous teenage assassin, who is on the run. The film starred Saoirse Ronan, Eric Bana and Cate Blanchett, and was a critical and sleeper hit. In 2014, Williams co-starred in David Cronenberg's Maps to the Stars, a dark comic look at Hollywood excess. In 2014 she portrayed Meg Hamilton in the British mystery film Altar.

In 2017, Williams began appearing in the Starz science-fiction series Counterpart, playing Emily, the wife of lead character Howard Silk. In one universe she is still married to him, but her counterpart in the other universe is divorced from him. In 2021, she was cast as Camilla Parker Bowles, for the final two seasons of The Crown.

== Personal life ==
She had a seven-year relationship and then engagement to the actor Jonathan Cake, which ended two weeks before their planned wedding. In 2003, she married the actor and playwright Rhashan Stone, with whom she has two daughters.

After filming The Postman, she spent time in Bolivia studying spectacled bears in the rainforest.

Williams was diagnosed with VIPoma in 2018 and, after treatment, became an ambassador for Pancreatic Cancer UK.

== Filmography ==
Key
†	Denotes films that have not yet been released

=== Film ===
Year	Film	Role	Notes
1997	Beck	Karen Quinn	
1997	Gaston's War	Nicky	
1997	The Postman	Abby	
1998	Rushmore	Rosemary Cross	
1999	The Sixth Sense	Anna Crowe	
2000	Four Dogs Playing Poker	Audrey	
2000	Born Romantic	Eleanor	
2000	Dead Babies	Diana	aka Mood Swingers
2001	The Body	Sharon Golban	
2001	Lucky Break	Annabel Sweep / Lady Hamilton in show	
2001	The Man from Elysian Fields	Andrea	
2002	The Heart of Me	Madeleine	
2002	Below	Claire	
2003	To Kill a King	Anne Fairfax	
2003	Peter Pan	Mrs. Darling	
2005	Valiant	Victoria (voice)	
2005	Tara Road	Ria	
2005	Mockingbird	Mother	
2006	X-Men: The Last Stand	Moira MacTaggert	Uncredited
2008	Flashbacks of a Fool	Grace Scott	
2008	Broken Lines	Zoe	
2009	An Education	Miss Stubbs	
2010	The Ghost Writer	Ruth Lang	
2010	Sex & Drugs & Rock & Roll	Betty Dury	
2011	Collaborator	Emma Stiles	
2011	Hanna	Rachel	
2011	Wild Bill	Kelly	
2012	Anna Karenina	Countess Vronskaya	
2012	Now Is Good	Mother	
2012	Hyde Park on Hudson	Eleanor Roosevelt	
2013	The Last Days on Mars	Kim Aldrich	
2013	Justin and the Knights of Valour	Queen (voice)	
2014	Sabotage	Caroline Brentwood	
2014	Maps to the Stars	Cristina Weiss	
2014	Altar	Meg Hamilton	
2015	Seventh Son	Mam Ward	
2015	Man Up	Hilary	
2016	The White King	Sophia (voice)	
2017	Victoria & Abdul	Jane Spencer	
2020	The Father	The Woman	
2023	The Trouble with Jessica	Beth	
2024	Another End	Juliette	

=== Television ===
Year	Title	Role	Notes
1992	Van der Valk	Irene Kortman	Episode: "Still Waters"
1992	The Ruth Rendell Mysteries	Jennifer Norris	Episode: "The Speaker of Mandarin"
1996	Emma	Jane Fairfax	Television film
1998	Friends	Felicity	2 episodes
2000	Jason and the Argonauts	Hera	2 episodes
2001	Spaced	Knocked-down cyclist	Episode: "Help"
2004	Agatha Christie: A Life in Pictures	Agatha Christie	Television film
2006	Krakatoa: The Last Days	Johanna Beijerinck	Television film
2007	Damage	Michelle Cahill	Television film
2008	Miss Austen Regrets	Jane Austen	Television film
2009–2010	Dollhouse	Adelle DeWitt	Main role
2010	Terriers	Miriam Foster	Episode: "Change Partners"
2011–2012	Case Sensitive	Charlie Zailer	4 episodes
2014	Salting the Battlefield	Belinda Kay	Television film
2014–2015	Manhattan	Liza Winter	Main role
2017	The Halcyon	Lady Hamilton	8 episodes
2017–2019	Counterpart	Emily Burton Silk	Main role
2020	Homemade	Queen (voice)	Episode: "Voyage Au Bout De La Nuit"
2021–2023	The Nevers	Lavinia Bidlow	Main role
2022	Ten Percent	Olivia Williams	Episode #1.2
2022–2023	The Crown	Camilla Parker Bowles	Main role (seasons 5–6)
2023–2024	Funny Woman	Gloria	4 episodes
2024–present	Dune: Prophecy	Tula Harkonnen	Main role
2024	The Lord of the Rings: The Rings of Power	Winterblossom the Entwife (voice)	Episode: "Eldest"
2025	The Wheel of Time	Morgase Trakand	Episode: "A Question of Crimson"
2025	Monster: The Ed Gein Story	Alma Reville	2 episodes
TBA	The Good Daughter †	Harriet Quinn	Upcoming series

=== Theatre ===
Olivia Williams theatre roles
Year	Production	Role	Venue
1995	Richard III	Maid / Nurse / Mistress	
2003	Love's Labour's Lost	The Princess	Olivier Theatre, National Theatre, London
2003	The Hotel in Amsterdam	Annie	Donmar Warehouse, London
2006	The Changeling	Beatrice-Joanna	Cheek by Jowl production at the Barbican Centre, London
2008	Happy Now?	Kitty	Cottesloe Theatre, National Theatre, London
2011	In a Forest, Dark and Deep	Betty	Vaudeville Theatre, London
2013	Scenes from a Marriage	Marianne	St James Theatre, London
2015	Waste	Amy O'Connell	Lyttelton Theatre, National Theatre, London
2017	Mosquitoes	Alice	Dorfman Theatre, National Theatre, London
2019	Tartuffe	Elmire	Lyttelton Theatre, National Theatre, London
2022	Marys Seacole	May	Donmar Warehouse, London
2026	One Flew Over The Cuckoo's Nest	Nurse Ratched	The Old Vic, London

== Awards and nominations ==
- 2001: Lucky Break
  - Nominated: Empire Award for Best Actress
- 2002: The Heart of Me
  - Won: British Independent Film Award for Best Actress
- 2009: An Education
  - Nominated: London Film Critics Circle Award for British Supporting Actress of the Year
  - Nominated: Screen Actors Guild Award for Outstanding Performance by a Cast in a Motion Picture
- 2010: The Ghost Writer
  - Won: London Film Critics Circle Award for British Supporting Actress of the Year
  - Won: National Society of Film Critics Award for Best Supporting Actress
  - Nominated: Empire Award for Best Actress
  - Nominated: Los Angeles Film Critics Association Award for Best Supporting Actress
- 2023 and 2024: The Crown:
  - Nominated: Screen Actors Guild Award for Outstanding Performance by an Ensemble in a Drama Series
- 2025: Dune: Prophecy
  - Nominated: Gotham TV Award for Outstanding Supporting Performance in a Drama Series
