= Bene Gesserit =

Fictional organization in the Dune franchise created by Frank Herbert

- Dune franchise element
- Reverend Mother Gaius Helen Mohiam (Siân Phillips) and other Bene Gesserit from David Lynch's Dune (1984)
- First appearance: Dune; 1965
- Created by: Frank Herbert
- Genre: Science fiction

In-universe information
- Traits and abilities: Superior physical and mental conditioning

The Bene Gesserit (/ˈbɛniː ˈdʒɛsərɪt/) are a group in Frank Herbert's fictional Dune universe. A powerful social, religious, and political force, the Bene Gesserit are described as an exclusive sisterhood whose members train their bodies and minds through years of physical and mental conditioning to obtain superhuman powers and abilities that seem magical to outsiders. The group seeks to acquire power and influence to direct humanity on an enlightened path, a concerted effort planned and executed over millennia.

Members who have acquired the full range of Bene Gesserit abilities are called Reverend Mothers; some outsiders call them "witches" for their secretive nature and misunderstood powers. As the skills of a Bene Gesserit are as desirable as an alliance with the Sisterhood itself, they are able to charge a fee (Note: As of roughly 10,100 AG, the time of the first Dune novel.) to teach women from Great Houses, and install some of their initiates as wives and concubines to their advantage. Loyal only to themselves and their collective goals, Bene Gesserit sometimes feign other loyalties to attain their goals and avoid outside interference.

The Bene Gesserit are primary characters in all of Frank Herbert's Dune novels, as well as the prequels and sequels written by Brian Herbert and Kevin J. Anderson. They also feature prominently in the multiple adaptations of the Dune series: the 1984 film Dune; the 2000 TV miniseries Frank Herbert's Dune; and its 2003 sequel, Frank Herbert's Children of Dune; as well as the 2021 feature film Dune, and its 2024 sequel, Dune: Part Two. A television series based on the Bene Gesserit, called Dune: Prophecy, debuted on November 17, 2024, on Max.

Some of their fictional powers are analyzed and deconstructed from a real-world scientific perspective in the non-fiction book The Science of Dune (2008), written by physicist Kevin Grazier and other experts.

== Plotlines ==
=== Original Dune series ===
In Frank Herbert's 1965 novel Dune, the Bene Gesserit are a secretive matriarchal order who have achieved superhuman abilities through physical and mental conditioning and the use of the drug melange. Under the guise of humbly "serving" the Empire, the Sisterhood is in fact a major power in the universe, using its many areas of influence to subtly guide humanity along the path of its own plan for humanity's future. Herbert notes that over 10,000 years before the events of Dune, in the chaotic time after the Butlerian Jihad and before the unveiling of the Orange Catholic Bible, the Bene Gesserit "consolidated their hold upon the sorceresses, explored the subtle narcotics, developed prana-bindu training and conceived the Missionaria Protectiva, that black arm of superstition. But it is also the period that saw the composing of the litany against fear and the assembly of the Azhar Book, that bibliographic marvel that preserves the great secrets of the most ancient faiths."

Millennia later in Dune, the Bene Gesserit base of power is the Mother School on the planet Wallach IX, whose graduates are fit mates for Emperors, and whose specially trained Truthsayers can detect falsehood. But beyond the outer virtues of poise, self-control, and diplomacy, Bene Gesserit training includes superior combat skills and precise physiological control that grants them total control over their bodies, including direct control over conception and embryotic sex determination, ageing, and even the ability to render poisons harmless within their bodies. The Bene Gesserit power of Voice allows them to control others by merely modulating their vocal tones. Sisters who survive a ritualized poisoning known as the spice agony achieve increased awareness and abilities through access to Other Memory, and are subsequently known as Reverend Mothers. Every member of the Bene Gesserit is conditioned into singular loyalty to the order and its goals with allegiances to even family being secondary, and no goal is more paramount than the Sisterhood's large-scale breeding program. It aims to create a superbeing that can tap into abilities even the Bene Gesserit cannot, a being whom they can use in order to gain more direct control over the universe. To this end, the Bene Gesserit have subtly manipulated bloodlines for generations, using breeding sisters to "collect" the genes they require.

Reverend Mother Mohiam (Zuzana Geislerová) and other Bene Gesserit, from the Dune miniseries (2000)

The Bene Gesserit super-being – whom they call the Kwisatz Haderach – arrives a generation earlier than expected in the form of Paul Atreides, who is free from their direct control though his mother is the Bene Gesserit Lady Jessica. In Dune, Paul seizes control of the harsh desert planet Arrakis, the only source of the all-important spice melange; by threatening to destroy all spice production, he maneuvers himself onto the Imperial throne. With Paul holding a tight monopoly on melange, a decade later the Bene Gesserit participate in a conspiracy to topple his rule in Dune Messiah (1969). Even after a blinded Paul walks into the desert to die, his sister Alia rules his empire and keeps the Bene Gesserit at bay until Paul's young son Leto II takes control himself in Children of Dune (1976). Over 3,500 years later, Leto – now a hybrid of human and sandworm – still dominates the universe as the tyrant God Emperor in God Emperor of Dune (1981). Through prescience, he foresees humanity's possible destruction, and has forced humanity into what he calls the Golden Path, a plan which he believes will assure their survival. Having halted all spice production and thus making his own stockpile the only source of melange left in the universe, Leto is able to maintain firm control over the various factions and effects a "forced tranquility". He takes the Bene Gesserit breeding program from them and uses it for his own mysterious purposes, and their limited spice supply is conditional on their obedience to him and his prescient vision. Recognizing that his work is finally done, Leto allows himself to be assassinated.

Fifteen hundred years later in Heretics of Dune (1984), the Bene Gesserit have regained their power and relocated to a hidden homeworld they call Chapterhouse, and the spice cycle has been renewed on Arrakis, now called Rakis. Although they still have a reputation as manipulators and witches, the Bene Gesserit operate much more openly than they did before, since many of their schemes are common knowledge thanks to the religion of Leto II. New opposition arrives in the form of a violent matriarchal order calling themselves the Honored Matres, a ruthless and brutal force who seek domination over the Old Empire and who do not use or rely on melange for their powers. As the Matres all but exterminate the Tleilaxu and next target the Sisterhood, Bene Gesserit Mother Superior Taraza implements a bold plan to release humanity from the oracular hold of Leto II by goading the Honored Matres into destroying Rakis. Meanwhile, the Bene Gesserit have terraformed Chapterhouse into a desert planet like Rakis by bringing a single sandworm there and drowning it, releasing its sandtrout, to begin a new spice cycle. In Chapterhouse: Dune (1985), the Honored Matres begin to destroy all of the Bene Gesserit-controlled planets and enslave the populace of the other planets they conquer. The Matres themselves are hunted by a far more powerful force from out in the Scattering. The new Mother Superior Darwi Odrade recognizes that the threat of this unknown enemy is greater than that of the Honored Matres, and forms another bold plan. The captive Honored Matre Murbella, who has been assimilated into the Bene Gesserit and gained the full powers of a Reverend Mother, defeats the leader of the Honored Matres in combat and thus becomes Great Honored Matre. She immediately succeeds Odrade as Mother Superior of the Bene Gesserit, joining the two forces under a single leader in an uneasy truce that, it is hoped, will be able to defeat the unknown enemy.

=== Sequels ===
In Hunters of Dune, the 2006 continuation of the series by Brian Herbert and Kevin J. Anderson, Murbella adopts the new title of Mother Commander and struggles to bring the opposing factions of her New Sisterhood together. Among the Bene Gesserit, some are willing to accept the merger with the Honored Matres, while others oppose allying with their enemies; a group of dissenters led by Reverend Mother Sheeana having fled Chapterhouse aboard a no-ship upon Murbella's ascension to leadership. Within the Honored Matres, many admire Murbella's strength and abilities and desire Bene Gesserit training, but resist assimilation. Additionally, a number of Honored Matres refuse to acknowledge Murbella as their leader; the largest such rebel group is led by Matre Superior Hellica on Tleilax. As Murbella amasses weapons for the coming battle with the unknown enemy, she trains an elite force of commando troops with the combined battle talents of Bene Gesserit, Honored Matres, and even the Swordmasters of Ginaz. These "Valkyries" are able to effect Hellica's defeat, galvanizing many dissenters into finally joining Murbella's cause against the unknown enemy, now revealed to be the resurrected thinking machines thought destroyed 15,000 years before. In the 2007 sequel, Sandworms of Dune, the thinking machines have unleashed decimating viruses on planet after planet, while Face Dancers infiltrate human civilization in their own insidious plot to take over the universe. The New Sisterhood's fleet of warships succumbs to Face Dancer sabotage, but is saved from thinking machine attack by a host of Guild Navigators in heighliners, brought together by the Oracle of Time, Norma Cenva. Thinking machine leader Omnius is wiped out of existence by the Oracle, and the Face Dancer threat eliminated. As Murbella joins Duncan Idaho in his plan to rule a universe in which humanity and thinking machines co-exist, Sheeana introduces sandworms to the former thinking machine planet Synchrony, where she will found an orthodox Sisterhood.

=== Legends of Dune ===
In the Legends of Dune prequel trilogy (2002–2004) by Brian Herbert and Anderson it is revealed that the Sorceresses of Rossak, who possess destructive telekinetic powers existing only in women and have a breeding plan to create more powerful telepaths, had been the predecessors of the Bene Gesserit. As a Sorceress is always killed when she unleashes her full power, they sacrifice themselves to destroy some of the Titans and Neo-Cymeks during the Butlerian Jihad, over 10,000 years before the events in Dune. Later, they expand their genetic program to preserve human bloodlines when humanity is endangered by a widespread plague called the "Demon Scourge", genetically engineered and unleashed by the thinking machines. Raquella Berto-Anirul becomes their leader after surviving a poisoning attempt by being the first to internally render the toxin harmless. The ordeal also makes Raquella the first to access Other Memory and use the power of Voice; she later establishes the Bene Gesserit, instituting a similar ritualized poisoning to unlock the same abilities in others.

=== Great Schools of Dune ===
In Sisterhood of Dune (2012), 80 years have passed since the end of the Butlerian Jihad, and an aging Raquella remains the only Sister to have survived the Agony. Ambitious young Valya Harkonnen has hopes of using her Bene Gesserit training to complete her family's vendetta against Vorian Atreides and his entire bloodline. Valya is one of the Sisters trusted with the records of Raquella's breeding program, which are maintained by a secret cache of forbidden computers, concealed in a cave outside the Sisterhood School on Rossak. Raquella's granddaughter Dorotea undergoes the Agony and becomes a Reverend Mother, discovering the truth about her parentage and the existence of computers. As a devout anti-technology Butlerian, she assists Emperor Salvador Corrino in his raid on the Rossak school. Salvador has several dozen Sisters executed and disbands the Sisterhood, except for Dorotea's Orthodox followers, who return to the Imperial capital on Salusa Secundus to serve as court Truthsayers.

Raquella has reestablished her school on Wallach IX in Mentats of Dune (2014), thanks to the help of industrialist Josef Venport. Valya, now a Reverend Mother, retrieves the hidden computers from Rossak and hopes to succeed the declining Raquella as Mother Superior. Raquella believes that the only hope for the Sisterhood to survive is for the Wallach IX sisters to reconcile with Dorotea's faction on Salusa Secundus; her health failing, she summons Dorotea to the School and forces Dorotea and Valya to put their differences aside and agree to work together for the good of the Sisterhood. Naming them co-leaders, Raquella dies; Valya however, still bitter about Dorotea's betrayal, uses her newly discovered power of Voice to force Dorotea to commit suicide. Valya declares herself to be the sole Mother Superior, and ingratiates herself to the new Emperor, Roderick Corrino.

== Goals, strategies, and ritual ==
=== Breeding program ===
The ultimate goal of the Bene Gesserit Sisterhood, up to the end of the novel Dune, is the creation of a male Bene Gesserit they call the Kwisatz Haderach (/ˈkwɪsɑːts ˈhɑːdəræk/, defined by Herbert as "The Shortening of the Way", the term comes from the Hebrew mystical term Kefitzat Haderech). They intend to achieve this superbeing through a massive human breeding program, which they have conducted for countless generations; using careful manipulations of relationships and breeding sisters to "collect" key genes, the Bene Gesserit have controlled and finessed bloodlines through the ages. Also called "the one who can be two places simultaneously" or "the one who can be many places at once", the Kwisatz Haderach, with mental powers that would bridge space and time and access to both male and female lines in Other Memory, will be an overt figure in the Bene Gesserit's manipulations and thrust upon the universe as a messiah.

In Dune, the millennia-old Bene Gesserit breeding scheme is, in theory, to have come at long last to full fruition in another generation by means of the union of an Atreides daughter (planned to be born of the Bene Gesserit Lady Jessica and the Duke Leto Atreides) with Feyd-Rautha Harkonnen, a nephew of the Baron Vladimir Harkonnen (himself secretly the spawning father of Lady Jessica). This entire plan is disrupted when Jessica chooses instead to conceive the male heir for which her Duke so wishes rather than the daughter that the plan had ordered her to produce.

This surprise son, Paul Atreides, is the apt pupil of tutelage in many excellent schools of training, most of all in his mother's own Bene Gesserit ways, and he eventually proves himself indeed to be the Kwisatz Haderach, although unexpected in his characteristics and born a generation earlier than planned. The ruination of House Atreides after their move to Arrakis actually positions the refugee Paul to assume the position of prophesied messiah among the indomitable native population of the deadly desert planet: the secretive Fremen. Political intrigue, religious belief, and Paul's character and his uniting of great powers within himself, all result in his further assumption of the throne of the Emperor of the Known Universe, secured by his peerless Fremen armies and by, most of all, his complete control over the melange supply.

A decade later, in Dune Messiah, the Bene Gesserit are frustrated to be at the mercy of their own creation, but a conspiracy to remove Paul from power fails. He realizes, however, that while prescience grants knowledge, absolute control of outcomes is not possible due to interference patterns caused by their own actions. Despising the religion that has risen up around him and seeing where it will lead, Paul walks into the desert seeking death in hopes that he can change the course of the future.

Paul's son Leto II is also a Kwisatz Haderach; seeing the same future, Leto decides to do what his father could not bring himself to do: he takes control of both the empire and the Bene Gesserit breeding program in Children of Dune, and begins his own transformation into a human-sandworm hybrid to give himself the time he needs for his Golden Path to be fully realized.

Thirty-five hundred years later, his breeding plan produces Siona Atreides, the first in a line of humans who are able to disappear from prescient sight, and Leto allows himself to be assassinated. After 1,500 more years (as chronicled in Heretics of Dune and Chapterhouse Dune), the Bene Gesserit have restored their breeding program. However, they are too terrified of the consequences of producing another Kwisatz Haderach, so instead breed for special individuals of great talent and usefulness in order to amplify certain human characteristics and preserve them. Now aware of Leto's Golden Path, the Bene Gesserit widen their goals of advancing humanity and saving it from extinction.

The behind-the-scenes intrigues of the breeding program are illuminated in the Prelude to Dune prequel trilogy (1999–2001) as the program nears fruition in the time immediately prior to the novel Dune. The origins of the program are explored in the Legends of Dune prequel series. Over 10,000 years before the events of Dune, the Sorceresses of Rossak had started keeping detailed breeding records circa 400 B.G., trying to improve the potency and prevalence of their telekinetic powers. In 108 B.G., the Sorceresses begin collecting genetic samples of various human bloodlines, which were in jeopardy from a catastrophic virus genetically engineered and unleashed by the thinking machines.

In Sandworms of Dune (2007), written by Brian Herbert and Kevin J. Anderson, Duncan Idaho is revealed to be the final Kwisatz Haderach destined to bring together humans and thinking machines. While he is not a product of a breeding program, his multiple rebirths and deaths as a ghola throughout the series had given him the opportunity to gain experience and develop himself as no other human could.

=== Avoiding direct power ===
The Bene Gesserit choose to use indirect methods to further their goals, rather than wield overt power themselves. They have noted the Taoist principle that whatever rises must fall; and so rather than taking direct control of the human race, they instead manipulate the social and political order with subtlety and insinuation, often using extraordinarily long-term stratagems spanning generations. The Bene Gesserit avoid appearing too rich or powerful, or revealing the extent of their powers, to prevent being seen as overtly responsible for the rise and fall of governments and empires, and to avoid any organized backlash. To this end, the Bene Gesserit provide some of their trained initiates as wives and concubines, and will train the daughters of noble families for a fee.

In Dune, Padishah Emperor of the known universe Shaddam IV keeps the wise but calculating Bene Gesserit Truthsayer Mohiam by his side at all times. The Emperor's deceased wife, Anirul, had been a "Bene Gesserit of Hidden Rank", and Herbert notes that every one of their five daughters is Bene Gesserit-trained. In fact, Shaddam is kept without a male heir on specific orders from the Sisterhood, and is bound by an agreement that only a daughter will ascend his throne. The Bene Gesserit had also placed their acolyte Jessica (herself the product of a secret Bene Gesserit liaison with the Baron Harkonnen) as the concubine to Duke Leto Atreides, and married the Bene Gesserit Margot to Shaddam's close friend and minion Count Fenring. After Shaddam's eldest daughter Princess Irulan is forced into marriage to Paul to secure his claim to the Imperial throne, in Children of Dune Irulan's loyalty to the Sisterhood gives them false hope that she can help them topple Paul, or at least control his offspring. Later in God Emperor of Dune, Herbert establishes that despite Leto's many restrictions on them, the Bene Gesserit still train young noblewomen for a price. In fact, when Leto meets Hwi Noree, the Ixian ambassador obviously bred and trained to charm him, he realizes "that part of her education had been conducted by the Bene Gesserit. She had their way of controlling her responses, of sensing the undertones in a conversation. He could see, however, that the Bene Gesserit overlay had been a delicate thing, never penetrating the basic sweetness of her nature."

=== Missionaria Protectiva ===
With the Lady Jessica and Arrakis, the Bene Gesserit system of sowing implant-legends through the Missionaria Protectiva came to its full fruition. The wisdom of seeding the known universe with a prophecy pattern for the protection of B.G. personnel has long been appreciated, but never have we seen a condition-ut-extremis with more ideal mating of person and preparation. The prophetic legends had taken on Arrakis even to the extent of adopted labels (including Reverend Mother, canto and respondu, and most of the Shari-a panoplia propheticus). And it is generally accepted now that the Lady Jessica's latent abilities were grossly underestimated.

— from Analysis: The Arrakeen Crisis by the Princess Irulan

The Bene Gesserit practice "religious engineering" through the Missionaria Protectiva, which spreads "infectious superstitions on primitive worlds, thus opening those regions to exploitation by the Bene Gesserit". Collectively known as Panoplia Prophetica, these myths, prophecies, and superstitions provide the opportunity for a Bene Gesserit to later cast herself as a guide, protector, or some other figure in fulfillment of a prophecy in order to manipulate the religious subjects for protection or other purposes. These myths also exploit religion as a powerful force in human society; by controlling the particulars of religion, the Bene Gesserit have a manipulative lever on society in general. The Bene Gesserit also employ the Missionaria Protectiva to prepare the Empire for its Kwisatz Haderach.

In Dune, Jessica and Paul take refuge among the Fremen after the attack on House Atreides. With his mother's guidance, Paul is able to make use of the planted myths by claiming to be the "mahdi", a messianic figure from legendary material planted among the Fremen by the Missionaria Protectiva. That the mahdi legend has been planted on Dune indicates to Jessica that conditions on Dune are truly awful, since this legend is reserved for only the harshest environments where a Bene Gesserit would need the maximum advantage over surrounding influences. Paul's meteoric rise to power is greatly facilitated by his association with the mahdi legend. Later, in Heretics of Dune, the Bene Gesserit plan to use Reverend Mother Sheeana's ability to control the great sandworms to build her into a religious figure around whom they can fashion a mass devoted following, uniting many factions in the universe under the Bene Gesserit and against the forces of the Scattering.

=== Spice agony ===
The spice agony is an ordeal in which an acolyte of the Bene Gesserit takes a poisonous "awareness spectrum" narcotic and, by internally changing the substance and neutralizing its toxicity, gains access to Other Memory, the combined ego and memories of all her female ancestors. In Dune, Lady Jessica notes that the ritual originated with the "discovery of the poison drug on Rossak", although by her time, the Rossak drug has long since been replaced by melange. On Arrakis, the Fremen Reverend Mothers use a poison called Water of Life, which is the exhalation of a drowning "little maker" (small sandworm) in water. In the Fremen version of the rite, after the ordeal the Reverend Mother also provides the changed poison for the sietch orgy.

An acolyte unable to effect this change dies. Only women have ever survived the agony, but through their breeding program the Bene Gesserit seek the male Kwisatz Haderach who will be able to change an illuminating poison. The Bene Gesserit try over many generations through selective breeding to produce such a being. A Kwisatz Haderach is given abilities different from those of a Reverend Mother. During the spice agony, there are two areas of the soul that the acolyte may visit — the part that gives, and the part that takes; a Reverend Mother cannot access the memories of her male ancestors, and is terrified by the psychic space within her that the masculine memories inhabit. Until Paul Atreides, all men who had attempted the spice agony had died.

In Dune, Jessica endures the agony while pregnant with her daughter, Alia. This has a profound effect on the unborn Alia, who is consequently born a full Reverend Mother with the complete Other Memory of both her female and male ancestors. The Bene Gesserit refer to children born this way as "Abominations". Without the benefit of a fully formed adult ego of her own, Alia is susceptible to the influence of her ancestral memories. This ultimately leads to her downfall, as she is eventually possessed by the persona of her evil grandfather Baron Vladimir Harkonnen, whom she herself had murdered as a child in the events of Dune.

The origin of the ritual is explained in the prequel novel Dune: The Battle of Corrin (2004) when Raquella Berto-Anirul is poisoned by Rossak Sorceress Ticia Cenva with the Rossak drug. Raquella manages to internally convert the poison into a harmless substance and is thus the first to experience the awakening of Other Memory. Raquella later establishes the Bene Gesserit, presumably perfecting the technique and training others to survive the ordeal.

== Powers ==
=== Other Memory ===
One of the 'powers' of a Bene Gesserit Reverend Mother is her Other Memory: the combined ego and memories of all her female ancestors, passed on through genetic memory, and thus, up to the point where each following ancestor was born and the physical contact with the mother broken. The ego/memory combination remains a distinct identity within the Reverend Mother's mind, and is able to inject itself into her awareness at appropriate or emotional moments, though the Reverend Mother's ego is always dominant. The prequel novel Dune: The Battle of Corrin by Brian Herbert and Kevin J. Anderson establishes that the first Bene Gesserit to access Other Memory had been Raquella Berto-Anirul, the founder of the order.

A Reverend Mother has access only to her female lineage in Other Memory; her male line is unavailable to her, present as a dark void that terrifies her. Until the time of God Emperor of Dune, the purpose of the Bene Gesserit breeding scheme is to breed a Kwisatz Haderach, a male with Other Memory who can see both lines, male and female. Male memory will be complete until moment of conception, when physical contact with the father is lost.

Reverend Mothers may also pass their own ego/memory combination to other Reverend Mothers at will, merely by touching foreheads. When a Reverend Mother dies in the presence of another Reverend Mother, the second will accept the ego/memory of the first to prevent the loss of the dying Reverend Mother's experience and ancestral memories. Especially when the Mother Superior perishes, it is important to take her ego/memory so that her plans and strategies may continue uninterrupted. This is first explored in Dune, when Jessica accepts the life experience of the dying Fremen Reverend Mother Ramallo. In Chapterhouse Dune, Darwi Odrade is Mother Superior, a contentious choice ratified by the fact that she was present at the previous Mother Superior's death, and has her in Other Memory; she represents the most continuous line of leadership. Under extreme conditions, a large community of Bene Gesserit will practice Extremis Progressiva, a mass sharing of ego/memories with each other to spread all the ego/memories amongst everyone; thus, if one survives, they all survive. In Chapterhouse Dune, the Bene Gesserit school on Lampadas, under attack by the Honored Matres, undertakes Extremis Progressiva; Lucilla escapes with the "Lampadas Horde", hoping to return to the Bene Gesserit with them.

Brian Herbert, Frank Herbert's son and biographer, explains that the concept of Other Memory is "largely based upon the writings and teachings of Carl Gustav Jung, who spoke of a 'collective unconscious', that supposedly inborn set of 'contents and modes of behavior' possessed by all human beings". Frank Herbert was introduced to Jung's work by two Jungian psychologists, Ralph and Irene Slattery, and Jung's teachings ultimately had "a profound and continuing influence on [Herbert's] work".

=== The Voice ===
Bene Gesserit are trained in what they call "the Voice" – a means "to control others merely by selected tone shadings of the voice". By modulating the subtleties of her voice, a Bene Gesserit can issue commands on a subconscious level, compelling obedience in others that they cannot resist, whether they are consciously aware of the attempt or not. This control can be as subtle as influencing thoughts and motivations, or as strong as forcing physical actions and even temporary paralysis in the subject. The Voice may also be subtly employed in any manner of conversation, public speaking, or debate to help soothe, convince, persuade, influence, or otherwise enhance the effect of the words being spoken. To affect this, the Bene Gesserit must "register" the intended target by analyzing his or her personality and vocal patterns through observation or seemingly innocuous direct questions.

Training in the Voice is independent of the Reverend Mother ritual, so people outside the order may be instructed in its use. Before the events of Dune, Jessica has begun teaching it to Paul; after the Reverend Mother Mohiam tests him in the novel, she urges Jessica to "ignore the regular order of training. His own safety requires the Voice. He already has a good start in it, but we both know how much more he needs...and that desperately." Jessica herself later notes of Paul's novice attempt: "The tone, the timbre excellent – imperative, very sharp. A slightly lower pitch would have been better, but it could still fall within this man's spectrum."

The Voice is useless against targets who cannot hear the speaker; both Baron Harkonnen in Dune and House Corrino in Children of Dune employ deaf people to guard Jessica, knowing that she cannot control them via the Voice. Being a manipulation of the target's subconscious mind, the Voice is of limited utility against an extremely disciplined mind, such as a Reverend Mother or a strong Mentat; if the target understands what the Voice is and how it works, and is aware that it is being used, he may resist it. One trained in the use of the Voice may easily detect its use by others, even subtly. In Dune Messiah, Paul trains some guards to resist the Voice so that he may imprison Bene Gesserit. By the time of Children of Dune, Gurney Halleck has also been trained by Jessica to resist the Voice completely.

In Heretics of Dune, Reverend Mother Odrade explains to Sheeana that planetary populations exposed to long-term Voice control learn ways to adapt to it, and can no longer be manipulated. This is why the Honored Matres have been driven back into the Old Empire; over-controlling, they have built up both resistance and rebellion, and are now on the run from their former subjects.

The prequel Dune: The Battle of Corrin establishes that the first Bene Gesserit to use the Voice is Raquella Berto-Anirul, the founder of the order. The continuity of the TV series Dune: Prophecy depicts the Voice as the invention of Raquella's protégée, Valya Harkonnen.

=== Acute observation and Truthsay ===
Bene Gesserit are trained in "the minutiae of observation", noticing details that the common person would miss in the people and environment around them. When combined with their analytical abilities, this "hyperawareness" enables the Bene Gesserit to divine secrets and arrive at conclusions that are invisible to everyone else. Slight differences in air currents or the design of a room might allow a Bene Gesserit to detect hidden portals and spyholes; minute variations in a person's vocal inflection and body language allow a Bene Gesserit to deeply understand a person's emotional state, and manipulate it. Knowing that any schooling impresses a particular pattern in its students, they are able to use these clues to predict and anticipate actions. The Bene Gesserit can easily determine a person's origins and root language by analyzing their speech patterns, cadence, and pacing, as Jessica does when she realizes that a visiting Spacing Guild banker is a Harkonnen agent.

Bene Gesserit specifically trained as Truthsayers are able to determine whether someone is lying by analyzing their speech, body language, and physical signs like pulse and heart rate. In principle, all humans have such perception, but extensive training is required to develop this latent talent to the point of great usefulness. Truthsayers are used widely in politics and trade; the Padishah Emperors are never without one. Combined with the Voice, Truthsay is also useful for interrogation and torture.

=== Simulflow ===
Bene Gesserit also practice simulflow, the flow of several threads of consciousness at once—mental multitasking, as it were. The combination of simulflow with their analytical abilities and Other Memory are responsible for the frightening intelligence of the average Bene Gesserit, though this ability is less powerful than the analytical abilities of a Mentat. This simulflow can also be held with Other Memory; Reverend Mother Darwi Odrade practiced both forms in Heretics of Dune.

=== Prana-bindu training and the "weirding way" ===
The Bene Gesserit develop their physical abilities as well as their mental abilities. A trained Sister has full control over each muscle in her body through training known as prana-bindu. This allows her to bend the last joint in her little toe while remaining otherwise motionless, bend and contort her body in ways that most would consider impossible, or put a remarkable amount of force behind a physical blow. The mental part of prana-bindu, or prana-nervature (prana stands for breath, bindu stands for musculature) is the precise control of the totality of nerves in the human body. In Dune, Reverend Mother Mohiam tests Paul with a nerve induction device ("the box") that causes the sensation of intense pain. Paul learns that he is not the only one to have tried it, but is perhaps specially resistant; this conversation points to a widespread use of it as a tool among the Bene Gesserit to measure self control, nerve control, and as Mohiam puts it, crisis and observation.

Unarmed attacks are part of a specialized Bene Gesserit martial art which incorporates the prana-bindu methods of optimized muscle control. These enable one to deliver powerful blows and to move with extreme precision and speed. The basic principle behind it is that, as Farad'n of House Corrino says, "My mind affects my reality." A practitioner of the art has to know that the action he or she "wants" to perform has already been performed. For example, to imagine oneself behind an opponent at the current moment in time; when trained well, this knowledge will place you at the spot desired. To anyone witnessing, it almost appears as though the combatant has teleported.

The Fremen refer to this fighting ability as the "weirding way". In Dune, the Fremen use the word "weirding" instead of "Bene Gesserit", calling Jessica a "weirding woman" and noting "he has the weirding voice" when Paul wields this power.

=== Internal organic-chemical control ===
Just as the prana-bindu allows the Bene Gesserit to precisely control each muscle and nerve, they also have complete conscious control over the functions of their internal organs and body chemistry. A Sister can completely control her breathing and heart rate to the degree that she can appear dead to most tests even after intense physical exertion. They can control their need for food and water to the extremes of hunger and thirst, and even commit suicide at will by simply stopping their hearts or shutting down their brains. The Bene Gesserit are therefore immune to poisons, as they can simply change the chemical makeup of any harmful substance in their body and render it harmless. It is hinted that should a Bene Gesserit wish to, she could slow her aging process dramatically, controlling every aspect of her metabolism. It is suggested that a Sister would never attempt this, as it might call attention to the Sisterhood and reveal too much of their abilities. In Children of Dune, Jessica realizes that her daughter Alia has done this, which is her first sign that her daughter is sinking into Abomination.

One of the most significant biological abilities of the Bene Gesserit is their control of their own menstrual cycles, and their ability to control (at conception) their child's sex. Jessica was ordered to bear only daughters to the Atreides, but defied her Bene Gesserit sisters (out of her love for the Duke) and had a son, Paul Atreides. The Bene Gesserit conspired against the Padishah Emperor Shaddam IV's desire to have a male heir and instructed his Bene Gesserit wife to give him only daughters, such as Princess Irulan.

=== Sexual talents ===
The Bene Gesserit are notable for their extensive skill in seduction, sex and sexual imprinting. The most talented and most highly trained are known as Imprinters. Men in a position of power or future power, or those with specific qualities that the order wishes to incorporate into their breeding program, are typical targets of a Bene Gesserit imprinter. Men seduced by an imprinter are permanently affected (imprinted) by the intense sexual experience and are thereafter consciously or subconsciously favorable to the Sisterhood. An imprinter can be successfully resisted if the subject has been psychologically conditioned to do so, and the subject's automatic defensive response may even be entirely subconscious.

In Dune, Lady Fenring is instructed by the Bene Gesserit to seduce Feyd-Rautha Harkonnen in order to "preserve the bloodline" by retrieving his genetic material through conception. She also intends to "plant deep in his deepest self the necessary prana-bindu phrases to bend him", which she later refers to as the "Hypno-ligation of that Feyd-Rautha's psyche". When Paul later fights Feyd to the death, Jessica advises her son to temporarily stun him using the word-sound Uroshnor, typically implanted in a dangerous person who has been prepared by the Bene Gesserit. Paul, however, refuses to use this advantage.

In Heretics of Dune, Reverend Mother and Imprinter Lucilla is charged with the seduction-imprinting of the Duncan Idaho ghola so that the Sisterhood may assert some control over him; he ultimately avoids her. Lucilla also mentions the hundreds of sexual positions and variations she knows. In Heretics, the Honored Matres have themselves refined this ability to such an intense level that the targeted male becomes completely enslaved. The captured Honored Matre Murbella attempts this on Duncan; his own imprinting ability, secretly conditioned into him by his Tleilaxu creators, suddenly manifests itself. Murbella and Duncan imprint each other, neither having complete control over the other. In Chapterhouse Dune the order has learned the Honored Matre method from Murbella and use it for their own purposes, specifically to awaken the memories within the Miles Teg ghola.

== Weaknesses ==
=== Addiction to melange ===
Reverend Mothers are dependent on melange to give them their abilities. Any person who consumes melange regularly becomes addicted to it and requires it for survival; however, one who has gone through the agony has a far greater need. Though the effects of melange are highly favorable, including vastly increased lifespan and mental powers, withdrawal results in death. Melange is expensive and thus is a continual drain on the Sisterhood's wealth; the most significant threat to the Bene Gesserit is the potential loss of their supply. Paul Atreides and then his son Leto II assert control over the Bene Gesserit and keep them in check by grasping control of the planet Arrakis and the spice supply.

=== Abomination ===
A Bene Gesserit who survives the ritual spice agony gains access to Other Memory, the combined ego and memories of all her female ancestors. An adult Reverend Mother can manage the presence of these subordinate inner voices because she has a full personality of her own and a solid sense of self. However, if a Bene Gesserit undergoes the agony while pregnant, the fetus will also experience it, acquiring full consciousness and access to Other Memory. Since the child has not yet developed a sufficiently strong ego before being exposed to her tide of ancestors, she is more susceptible to their influence, and there is a danger that she will ultimately be overcome and possessed by a strong ancestral ego. The Bene Gesserit call this "Abomination", and such children are killed immediately. They are also referred to as "pre-born" in Children of Dune.

In Dune, Lady Jessica is pregnant when she undergoes the spice agony while among the Fremen; her resulting daughter, Alia, is born a full Reverend Mother, the mind of an adult in a child's body. She pretends to be a child, but others notice that she is different. The Bene Gesserit are eventually outraged and horrified by Alia's existence, but she is out of their control. Mohiam says, "I've said too much, but the fact remains that this child who is not a child must be destroyed. Long were we warned against such a one and how to prevent such a birth, but one of our own has betrayed us." In Children of Dune, an adult Alia eventually succumbs to the ancestral ego of her grandfather, the Baron Vladimir Harkonnen, who wants nothing more than the destruction of the Atreides, and is given another opportunity, from the inside, to realize it.

Paul Atreides and Chani's twins, Leto II and Ghanima, are also pre-born, but before they become possessed, they stumble across solutions: Leto, forced to undergo a radical spice agony, constructs an executive of benevolent ancestral egos (such as Paul and Paul's father Leto I) who protect him; Ghanima, as part of their plan to fake Leto's death, consciously blocks the memory of Leto and their plan, inadvertently developing a mental discipline capable of protecting her undeveloped ego. She also uses the ego of her mother, Chani, as a "door guard" of her alter egos, only "peeking behind the door" when she needs advice from Other Memory.

== Litany against fear ==
The litany against fear is an incantation used by the Bene Gesserit throughout the series to focus their minds and calm themselves in times of peril. The litany is as follows:

I must not fear.
Fear is the mind-killer.
Fear is the little-death that brings total obliteration.
I will face my fear.
I will permit it to pass over me and through me.
And when it has gone past, I will turn the inner eye to see its path.
Where the fear has gone there will be nothing.
Only I will remain.

Lady Jessica teaches it to her son Paul, who uses it in Dune when faced with Mohiam's test of his ability to withstand excruciating pain. The litany is shortened in David Lynch's 1984 film.

== Analysis ==
"Bene Gesserit" is Latin for "he/she shall have behaved well."

Brian Herbert, Frank Herbert's son and biographer, said of his father's creation of the Bene Gesserit:

When he was a boy, eight of Dad's Irish Catholic aunts tried to force Catholicism on him, but he resisted. Instead, this became the genesis of the Bene Gesserit Sisterhood. This fictional organization would claim it did not believe in organized religion, but the sisters were spiritual nonetheless. Both my father and mother were like that as well.

In Mycelium Running, mycologist Paul Stamets argues that Herbert was influenced by tales of María Sabina and the sacred mushroom cults of Mexico in creating the Bene Gesserit.

In Dreamer of Dune, Brian Herbert's 2003 biography of his father, the younger Herbert speculates that the name "Gesserit" is supposed to suggest to the reader the word "Jesuit" and thus evoke undertones of a religious order.

The powers of Bene Gesserit are an example of the use of hypnosis in science fiction.

== In adaptations ==
The Bene Gesserit appear in all of the Dune adaptations to date: the 1984 film Dune; the 2000 TV miniseries Frank Herbert's Dune; and its 2003 sequel, Frank Herbert's Children of Dune; as well as the 2021 feature film Dune, and its 2024 sequel, Dune: Part Two.

A prequel series called Dune: Prophecy, centered on the Bene Gesserit, premiered on Max on November 17, 2024. Showrunner Alison Schapker said, "We certainly don't want to take away [the Bene Gesserit's] mystique, but we do go behind their closed doors and kind of see how they operate".
