= Mentats of Dune =

2014 novel by Brian Herbert and Kevin J. Anderson

- First edition cover
- Authors: Brian Herbert; Kevin J. Anderson
- Audio read by: Scott Brick
- Language: English
- Series: Great Schools of Dune
- Genre: Science fiction
- Publisher: Tor Books
- Publication date: March 11, 2014
- Publication place: United States
- Media type: Print (hardcover & paperback)
- Pages: 448
- ISBN: 978-0-7653-2274-6
- OCLC: 66590377
- Dewey Decimal: 813.54
- Preceded by: Sisterhood of Dune
- Followed by: Navigators of Dune

Mentats of Dune is a 2014 science fiction novel by Brian Herbert and Kevin J. Anderson, set in the Dune universe created by Frank Herbert. It is the second book in their Great Schools of Dune prequel trilogy, which itself is a sequel to their Legends of Dune trilogy. Set nearly a century after the events of 2004's Dune: The Battle of Corrin, the novel continues to chronicle the beginnings of the Bene Gesserit, Mentat and Suk Schools, as well as the Spacing Guild, all of whom are threatened by the independent anti-technology forces gaining power in the aftermath of the Butlerian Jihad. The Great Schools of Dune trilogy, first mentioned by Anderson in a 2010 blog post, chronicles the early years of these organizations, which figure prominently in the original Dune novels.

== Plot summary ==
With anti-technology Butlerian forces of Manford Torondo growing in strength and influence, Prince Roderick Corrino sees a threat to the Imperial power of his brother, Emperor Salvador. Industrialist Josef Venport squares off against Torondo, whose interference thwarts Venport's business interests. Meanwhile, Gilbertus Albans grows increasingly fearful for his Mentat School on Lampadas (and the copy of the thinking machine Erasmus he is hiding there) as Torondo grows bolder. When Gilbertus refuses to force his Mentats to swear an oath to the Butlerians, his school is invaded and his past as a "machine sympathizer" is revealed. He is executed by Manford, but Anna Corrino escapes with Erasmus. Meanwhile, a riot incited by Torondo results in the death of Roderick's daughter; Salvador seizes the lucrative melange mining operations on Arrakis from Venport, who soon uses the constant danger of giant sandworms to orchestrate the Emperor's assassination.

Raquella Berto-Anirul has reestablished her Bene Gesserit school on Wallach IX, thanks to the help of Josef Venport. Valya Harkonnen, now a Reverend Mother, retrieves the hidden computers from Rossak and hopes to succeed the declining Raquella as Mother Superior. Raquella believes that the only hope for the Sisterhood to survive is for the Wallach IX sisters to reconcile with Dorotea's faction on Salusa Secundus; her health failing, she summons Dorotea to the School and forces Dorotea and Valya to put their differences aside and agree to work together for the good of the Sisterhood. Naming them co-leaders, Raquella dies; Valya however, still bitter about Dorotea's betrayal, uses her newly discovered power of Voice to force Dorotea to commit suicide. Valya declares herself to be the sole Mother Superior, and ingratiates herself to the new Emperor Roderick.

Vorian Atreides, feeling guilty for the death of Griffin Harkonnen, tries to help his struggling family with a secret infusion of funds to their whaling business on Lankiveil. He next travels to Caladan to meet his descendants, brothers Orry and Willem Atreides. Orry is brutally murdered on his wedding night by his new bride, the mysterious beauty Tula Veil. She is revealed to be Griffin and Valya's vengeful younger sister, Tula Harkonnen, who subsequently disappears.

== Reception ==
Mentats of Dune debuted at #17 on The New York Times Hardcover Fiction Best-Seller List.
