= Chani (character) =

- Dune character
- Zendaya as Chani in Dune (2021)
- First appearance: Dune (1963–1965)
- Created by: Frank Herbert
- Portrayed by: Sean Young (1984 film); Barbora Kodetová (2000 miniseries / 2003 sequel); Zendaya (2021 / 2024 / 2026 films)
- Voiced by: Karen Strassman (Dune)

In-universe information
- Alias: Sihaya
- Title: Imperial concubine
- Affiliation: Fremen; House Atreides
- Significant other: Paul Atreides
- Children: Leto (murdered while an infant); Leto II Atreides; Ghanima Atreides
- Relatives: Liet-Kynes (parent)

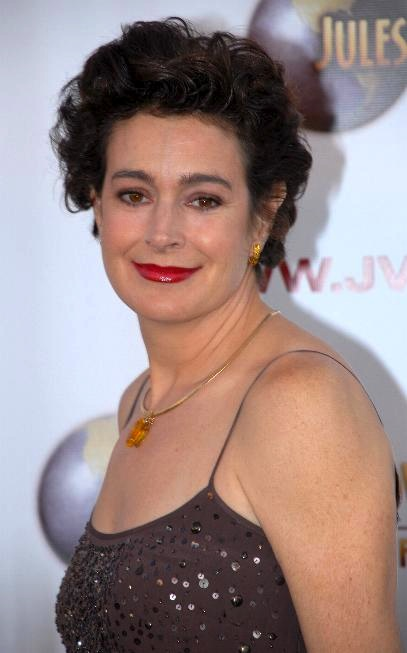
Sean Young portrays Chani in Dune (1984).

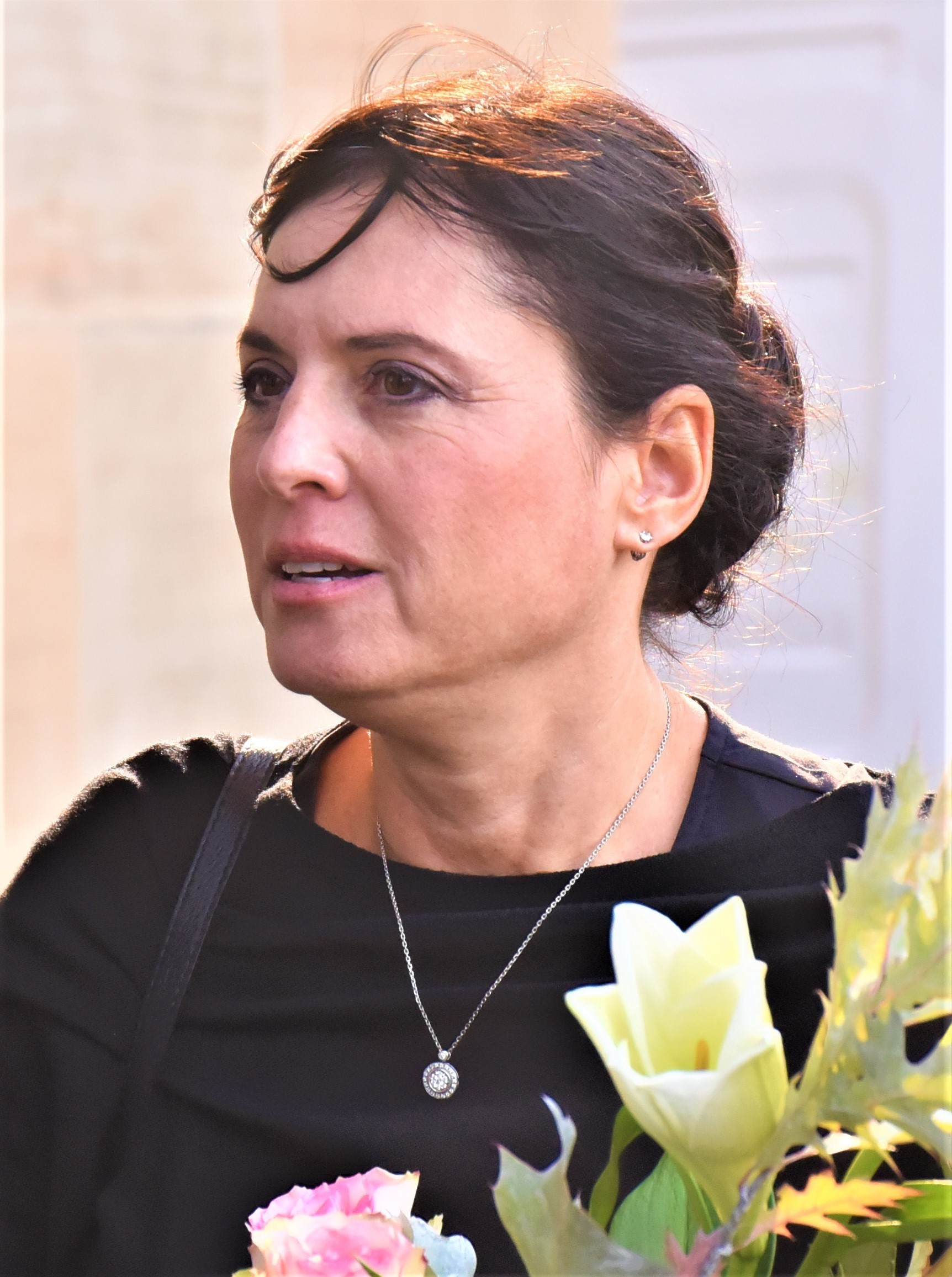
Barbora Kodetová portrays Chani in Frank Herbert's Dune (2000) and Frank Herbert's Children of Dune (2003).

Chani (/ˈtʃeɪni/ CHAY-nee or /ˈtʃɑːni/ CHAH-nee) (Note: Frank Herbert specified he intended for the "CHAY-nee" pronunciation to be used. However, several audiovisual works in the Dune franchise, including the 2021 and 2024 film adaptations of the first book, have used the "CHAH-nee" pronunciation.) is a character featured in Frank Herbert's novels Dune (1965) and Dune Messiah (1969). Known mainly as the Fremen wife and legal concubine of protagonist Paul Atreides, Chani is the daughter of Imperial Planetologist Liet-Kynes and his Fremen wife Faroula, and later the mother of the twins Ghanima and Leto II Atreides. The character is later resurrected as a ghola, appearing in Hunters of Dune (2006) and Sandworms of Dune (2007), Brian Herbert and Kevin J. Anderson's novels which complete the original series.

Chani is portrayed by actress Sean Young in the David Lynch film Dune (1984), and by Barbora Kodetová in the 2000 John Harrison miniseries Frank Herbert's Dune and its 2003 sequel Frank Herbert's Children of Dune. The character is played by Zendaya in the 2021 Denis Villeneuve film Dune and its sequels in 2024 and 2026.

== Character overview ==
=== Dune ===
In Dune, Paul's prescience begins manifesting itself through dreams while he is still living in his ancestral home on the planet Caladan; he sees Chani in these visions, though they have not yet met. Paul and the Atreides come to the desert planet Arrakis, but Paul's father Duke Leto is soon killed by the Harkonnens and Paul and his mother Lady Jessica are forced to flee into the desert. They are reluctantly taken in by a tribe of the planet's native Fremen, and Chani is the Fremen woman put in charge of protecting and guiding Paul. They soon become lovers, and Paul rises as a religious leader among the Fremen, and is called Muad'Dib.

Already a talented warrior before meeting Paul, Chani becomes deadly after training by Paul and Jessica in the Bene Gesserit martial arts called the "weirding way" by the Fremen. Chani later manages to bring Paul out of the deep spice trance he falls into after using spice essence to enhance his powers. Paul and Chani's first child, Leto II (not to be confused with their later son, Leto II Atreides), is killed as an infant in a Corrino raid on their home in the deep desert.

To cement his control of the Empire after deposing Padishah Emperor Shaddam IV, Paul takes Shaddam's daughter, the Princess Irulan, as his wife. Chani understands the political reasons, but Paul reassures her:

"I swear to you now ... that you'll need no title. That woman over there will be my wife and you but a concubine because this is a political thing and we must weld peace out of this moment, enlist the Great Houses of the Landsraad. We must obey the forms. Yet that princess shall have no more of me than my name. No child of mine nor touch nor softness of glance, nor instant of desire."

Jessica adds:

"Think on it, Chani: that princess will have the name, yet she'll live as less than a concubine—never to know a moment of tenderness from the man to whom she's bound. While we, Chani, we who carry the name of concubine—history will call us wives."

=== Dune Messiah ===
Twelve years later in Dune Messiah, Paul remains completely loyal to Chani. With their breeding program in mind, the Bene Gesserit are desperate to regain control of Paul's bloodline, and are fearful of the effect Chani's "wild" genes may have on their offspring. Wishing to rid himself of their machinations, Paul negotiates with the Bene Gesserit Reverend Mother Gaius Helen Mohiam: "You may have my seed, but not my person ... Irulan banished and inseminated ... You may have my seed for your plans, but no child of Irulan's will sit on my throne." Artificial insemination is prohibited in the wake of the Butlerian Jihad, and the idea of it is as horrific to the Sisterhood as the loss of the "precious Atreides genes".

Irulan, herself Bene Gesserit-trained, secretly feeds Chani contraceptives to prevent her from conceiving an Imperial heir. However, Chani eventually changes to an ancient Fremen diet to enhance fertility; Irulan is unable to interfere, and Chani soon becomes pregnant. Tragically, Chani dies giving birth to the twins Ghanima and Leto II. His intricate plan coming to fruition, the Tleilaxu agent Scytale offers to "resurrect" Chani as a ghola in return for Tleilaxu control of the empire, but Paul has him killed. Through his prescience, Paul can see that Chani's death during childbirth is far less painful and cruel than her possible future fates had she survived.

=== Children of Dune ===
Despite her death, Chani lives on as part of the Other Memory of her pre-born twins. In Children of Dune, this ancestral self is summoned by Ghanima for her guidance, but Chani's persona nearly possesses Ghanima completely. Leto II manages to save his sister from this Abomination by summoning Paul through his own Other Memory; Paul threatens Chani, who releases her hold on Ghanima. At the end of the novel, Chani's memory-self becomes a guardian against Ghanima's other ancestral memories who may try to possess her, allowing her daughter's personality to continue and grow in safety.

=== God Emperor of Dune ===
According to God Emperor of Dune, a version of Chani's memory-self also exists in Leto II. By the time of the novel, Leto is able to allow his ancestral memories to speak through his mouth without threat of Abomination. At one point, he allows Chani to speak through him.

=== Hunters of Dune and Sandworms of Dune ===
In the 2006 Brian Herbert/Kevin J. Anderson sequel Hunters of Dune, gholas of Paul and Chani are among the others created to assist mankind in the climactic battle with what turns out to be the thinking machines.

In Sandworms of Dune (2007), Paul ultimately duels another Paul Atreides ghola — named Paolo — created by the Face Dancers and twisted by the sadistic ghola of Baron Harkonnen himself. Paul is mortally wounded, but the trauma restores his memories and he manages to heal himself. Later, on the recovering planet Dune, the awakened gholas of Paul and Chani go about restoring the planet to its former glory. They have reverted to the ways of the ancient Fremen, resolving to lead simple lives and unafraid of the plots and schemes that had threatened them in their previous lives. Now able to devote all of his attention to her, Chani remarks that Paul has finally learned how to treat his wife. As the novel closes, Paul reaffirms his love for Chani, telling her he has loved her for five thousand years.

== In adaptations ==
Chani is portrayed by actress Sean Young in the David Lynch film Dune (1984),

Barbora Kodetová plays Chani in the John Harrison miniseries Frank Herbert's Dune (2000) and its sequel Frank Herbert's Children of Dune (2003). Emmet Asher-Perrin of Tor.com wrote that "Kodetová is divine as Chani in both her sensitivity and fierceness".

Zendaya portrays Chani in the 2021 Denis Villeneuve film Dune and its 2024 sequel, Dune: Part Two. Zendaya's portrayal of Chani, along with Timothée Chalamet's Paul, were added to Fortnite Battle Royale in October 2021. Villeneuve's depiction of Chani diverges from her portrayal in the books: where Herbert wrote her as fiercely loyal to Paul and his cause, in the film Chani is shown to grow increasingly alarmed at Paul's rise in power and doubtful of his proclaimed love for her. When he pledges to marry Princess Irulan and gains the Emperor's power, Chani refuses to bow to him and departs on a sandworm. Villeneuve notes that Dune Messiah was written partly to make clear Herbert's intention that Paul was an anti-hero, with Chani's depiction in the film serving as set-up for Villeneuve's planned Dune Messiah adaptation. Zendaya is confirmed to reprise the role in the upcoming sequel film, Dune: Part Three (2026), which will adapt Dune Messiah.

== Family tree ==
House Atreides family tree

House Atreides
House Harkonnen
House Corrino	Baron Vladimir; Harkonnen	Tanidia Nerus (Note: The Prelude to Dune prequel series (1999–2001) establishes that Tanidia Nerus is an alias of Gaius Helen Mohiam.)
Anirul	Shaddam IV	Leto I Atreides	Lady Jessica (Note: In Dune (1965), Jessica is the concubine of Leto I, and Chani becomes the concubine of their son, Paul.)
Count Dalak; Kenola	Princess Wensicia	Princess Irulan	Paul Atreides	Chani
Josifa	Farad'n	Ghanima Atreides	Leto II Atreides	Leto II Atreides; The Elder (Note: The infant Leto II Atreides is murdered in Dune, and his brother Leto II is later also named after their grandfather, Leto I, in Children of Dune (1976).)	Duncan Idaho
Chalice	Rugi	Many generations (Note: Per God Emperor of Dune, Duncan Idaho gholas was used several times in Leto II's breeding program)	Alia Atreides	Hayt (Note: Hayt is a ghola of Duncan Idaho, a kind of clone made using his corpse.)
Moneo Atreides
Siona Atreides
Many generations
Miles Teg
Darwi Odrade
