= Galach =

Galach may refer to:

- Galach (Dune), a fictional language in the Dune series of books
- Galach (Yiddish word), a Yiddish word referring to a Catholic priest or, sometimes, any type of Christian minister.
