= Dune movie =

Dune movie can refer to one of:

- Dune (1984 film)
- Dune (2021 film)
- Dune: Part Two
