= Arrakis Planitia =

Plain on Titan

- Feature type: Planitia
- Coordinates: 78.4°S 117.0°W
- Eponym: Arrakis

Arrakis Planitia is a planitia (plain) on Titan, the largest natural satellite of the planet Saturn. It is located in Titan's southern hemisphere, between 74 and 80° south and 113–134° east, within the Mezzoramia region.

Arrakis Planitia is named after Arrakis, a fictional desert planet that is featured prominently in Frank Herbert's Dune novels. The name follows a convention that Titanean plains are named after planets in Herbert's work.

In 2005, the Cassini orbiter observed a new large dark patch and a nearby smaller one on Arrakis Planitia. The patches were interpreted as ponding after a large storm in the area in October 2004. In 2009, Cassini observed the region again and found no dark features, suggesting that the liquid had evaporated.
