= Glossary of Dune (franchise) =

This is a list of terminology used in the fictional Dune universe created by Frank Herbert, the primary source being "Terminology of the Imperium", the glossary contained in the novel Dune (1965).

Dune word construction could be classified into three domains of vocabulary, each marked with its own neology: the names and terms related to the politics and culture of the Imperium, the names and terms characteristic of the mystic sodality of the Bene Gesserit, and the barely displaced Arabic of the Fremen language. Fremen share vocabulary for Arrakeen phenomena with the Empire, but use completely different vocabulary for Bene Gesserit-implanted messianic religion.

Due to the similarities between some of Herbert's terms and ideas and actual words and concepts in the Arabic and Hebrew languages — as well as the series' "Islamic undertones" and themes — a Middle Eastern influence on Herbert's works has been noted repeatedly. There are over eighty terms used of Arabic origin, several other loanwords from Indo-European languages such as German and Persian, and words from the North American Na-Dene language Navajo.

== A ==
- Aba – A loose, usually black robe worn by Fremen women and Bene Gesserit sisters.
- Abomination – Bene Gesserit term for one who is pre-born and thus susceptible to being taken over by the ancestral personalities in Other Memory.
- Ajidamal (or Amal) – Disastrously-flawed synthetic melange created by the Tleilaxu Project Amal before the process of producing spice in axlotl tanks is perfected.
- Akarso – "Plant native to Sikun (of 70 Ophiuchi A) characterized by almost oblong leaves. Its green and white stripes indicate the constant multiple, condition of parallel active and dormant chlorophyll regions."
- Arafel – The "cloud-darkness of holy judgment" or "cloud darkness at the end of the universe;" the end of mankind (as it was) averted by Leto II's Golden Path.
- Axlotl tank – Biological tank in which gholas and melange may be produced.
- Assassin's Handbook – "Third-century compilation of poisons commonly used in a War of Assassins. Later expanded to include those deadly devices permitted under the Guild Peace and Great Convention."

== B ==
- Baliset – "Nine-stringed musical instrument, lineal descendant of the zithra, tuned to the Chusuk scale and played by strumming. Favorite instrument of Imperial troubadours." Gurney Halleck is a master at playing the baliset in the series. In David Lynch's 1984 adaptation of Dune, a cosmetically altered Chapman Stick was used to portray the instrument. In the miniseries Frank Herbert's Dune, the baliset resembles a renaissance-era lute, with the pegbox bent back almost 90°. A real-world version of the baliset has been created, divided into two sections, the treble played with the right hand, and the bass the left. Unlike a guitar, each hand can play either chords or separate notes.
- Bashar – Military rank, slightly above a traditional Colonel and primarily used for military leader of a planetary subdistrict; alternately, Colonel Bashar, or Supreme Bashar for a military's most senior commander.
- Bene Gesserit – Secretive and powerful matriarchal order whose members possess extraordinary physical and mental powers.
- Bene Tleilax (or Tleilaxu) – Secretive and powerful patriarchal race known for their genetic manipulation technologies.
- Buddislam – Term for those religions derived from a syncretic fusion of denominations of Buddhism and Islam.
- Burseg – Military general.
- Butlerian Jihad – Mankind's "crusade against computers, thinking machines, and conscious robots." The term jihad is of Arabic origin.

== C ==
- Caid – "Sardaukar officer rank given to a military official whose duties call mostly for dealings with civilians; A military governorship over a full planetary district; Above the rank of Bashar but not equal to a Burseg."
- Caladan – Ancestral homeworld of House Atreides. A lush, oceanic planet with a wet, temperate climate, Caladan had served as the Atreides’ home for at least twenty-six generations at the time of the first novel.
- Carryall – Aircraft used on Arrakis to "transport large spice mining, hunting and refining equipment."
- Chairdogs – Living and partially sentient creatures created by the Tleilaxu, which are used for seating and possess the ability to shape themselves to fit their occupant.
- Chakobsa – Language on Arrakis, used by the Fremen for rituals and other purposes, inspired by the Caucasian hunting language of the same name. The language was further developed by David J. Peterson and Jessie Peterson for the films Dune (2021) and Dune: Part Two (2024).
- Chaumas (or Aumas) – "Poison in solid food as distinguished from poison administered in some other way."
- Chaumurky (or Musky) – "Poison administered in a drink."
- CHOAM (Combine Honnete Ober Advancer Mercantiles) – the "universal development corporation controlled by the Emperor and Great Houses with the Guild and Bene Gesserit as silent partners." This corporation essentially controls the economy of the known universe, with shares and directorships determining each House's income and financial leverage.
- Cogitor – One of several ancient philosophers whose brains are transplanted into fluid-filled canisters so that they can analyze the universe indefinitely.
- Communinet, ComNet or Comms – A local planetary communications network. Similar to Wireless radio communications, it relies on electromagnetic radiation to transmit audio and other information. Used by the Atreides and Harkonnen forces to communicate and issue battle commands.
- Cone of silence – Sound-deadening "field of a distorter that limits the carrying power of the voice or any other vibrator by damping the vibrations with an image-vibration 180 degrees out of phase." Used for privacy, the field does not visually obscure lip movement.
- Coriolis storm – Sandstorms on Arrakis in which "winds across the open flatlands are amplified by the planet's own revolutionary motion to reach speeds up to 700 kilometres per hour."
- Crysknife – Weapon made from the tooth of a sandworm from Arrakis.
- Cutterray – "Short-range version of a lasgun used mostly as a cutting tool and surgeon's scalpel."
- Cymek – Type of cyborg; specifically, a human brain implanted into a large, weaponized machine body.

== D ==
- D-wolves – Guardians of the Sareer on Arrakis in the time of Leto II Atreides; ferocious wolves descended from Gaze Hounds and ordinary wolves, "noted for their keen eyesight."
- Damper, Ixian – Portable device which hides words from anyone without the proper coded translator, and projects distortions that hide the precise movements of lips and the sounds of voices. It is described as a "black disc" buoyed midair by suspensors.
- Deathstill – Fremen device used to extract all moisture from a living or dead human or creature. This is traditionally done to reclaim precious water from the dead, who no longer require it; but in Children of Dune the device is used as a method of execution.
- Distrans – Steganographic device producing a "temporary neural imprint on the nervous system of Chiroptera (bats) or birds. The creature's normal cry then carries the message imprint, which can be sorted from that carrier wave by another distrans."

== E ==
- Elacca drug – Narcotic produced from the "blood-grained" elacca wood of Ecaz; users' skin shows a characteristic carrot color. The drug's effect is to remove most of the will to self-preservation; commonly used to prepare slave gladiators for the ring.
- Ego-likeness – Portraiture of one or more people, reproduced through a shigawire projector, that is capable of showing subtle movements said to convey the mannerisms and ego essence of the subjects.

== F ==
- Face Dancers – Creatures created by the Bene Tleilax that are able to mimic other humans exactly and go undetected by all known means, except by Bene Gesserit Truthsayers.
- Famine Times – Years after the reign of Leto II, marked by chaos and famine on many worlds, that led to the Scattering.
- Faufreluches – "The rigid rule of class distinction enforced by the Imperium. 'A place for every man and every man in his place.'"
- Fedaykin – /fɪˈdaɪkɪn/ "Fremen death commandos; historically: a group formed and pledged to give their lives to right a wrong." In Dune, they are personally trained by, and fiercely loyal to, Paul Atreides. The term is derived from the Arabic Fedayeen.
- Filmbook – A shigawire imprint, used for training and education, which carries a mnemonic pulse that imprints information and corresponding images in the reader's mind.
- Fish Speakers – All-female military force created by Leto II Atreides to enforce his rule over the known universe.
- Fogwood – Plant native to Ecaz, capable of being shaped by thought alone.
- Foldspace – An extra-dimensional region outside of spacetime accessible using a Holtzman drive, and traversable only by Guild Navigators who have ingested vast amounts of the psychotropic drug melange.
- Fremen – "Native" inhabitants of Arrakis.
- Fremkit – Fremen desert survival kit. Notable contents include an inflatable stilltent, a sand snorkel, a thumper, and maker hooks.
- Frigate – A class of spacecraft employed as both a troop carrier and a battleship. It was said that all the frigates and transport ships of House Atreides occupied a single corner of a Guild Heighliner’s immense cargo hold.
- Futar – Primitive and fierce humanoid creatures, a genetic mix of human and cat, artificially created by the Bene Tleilax out in the Scattering to hunt Honored Matres. Introduced briefly in Heretics of Dune and appearing in Chapterhouse: Dune, the species are brought as captives to the "million planets" by the Honored Matres, who keep them as pets. Futars use their voice-like scream to immobilize Honored Matres, but the scream has no effect on the Bene Gesserit.

== G ==
- Galach – Universal language of the Dune universe.
- Ghola – A type of Clone grown in an axlotl tank from genetic material retrieved from the cells of a deceased subject.
- Giedi Prime (later Gammu) – Homeworld of House Harkonnen. A dark, barren planet covered in buildings, factories, industrial plants and a heavy layer of pollution. This resulted in a low level of photosynthesis, leading to a severe lack of oxygen and the extinction of most animal and plant life on the planet’s surface.
- Glowglobe – "Suspensor-buoyed illuminating device, self-powered (usually by organic batteries)."
- Golden Lion Throne – Refers to both the physical throne upon which the Padishah Emperor sits, as well as the figurative position of the Emperor as the head of the Landsraad Council and ruler of the Known Universe.
- Golden Path – Leto II's strategy to prevent humanity's destruction.
- Gom jabbar – "Specific poison needle tipped with meta-cyanide used by Bene Gesserit Proctors in their death-alternative test of human awareness."
- Great Convention – "Universal truce enforced under the power balance maintained by the Guild, the Great Houses, and the Imperium. Its chief rule prohibits the use of atomic weapons against human targets." Any House that violates this rule is subject to having its entire planet destroyed by the others.
- Guild Navigator – Melange-mutated humans able to safely navigate interstellar space (using prescience) in ships called Heighliners.

== H ==
- Handlers – Humanoid race who bred and trained Futars to hunt Honored Matres.
- Harvester (also Harvester Factory or Crawler) – "Large (often 120 metres by 40 metres) spice mining machine ... [with a] buglike body on independent tracks."
- Heighliner – Enormous carrier starships used by the Spacing Guild for interstellar travel.
- Holtzman effect – Scientific phenomenon that makes (among other things) instantaneous space travel and defensive force shields possible. Such shields can be tuned to block projectiles moving faster than a chosen speed, typically a few centimeters per second in the case of personal protection.
- Honored Matres – Violent matriarchal order formed in the Scattering.
- Hunter-seeker – "Ravening sliver of suspensor-buoyed metal guided as a weapon by a nearby control console; common assassination device." Floating in mid-air, it kills by entering the body and following nerve pathways to vital organs. A hunter-seeker is employed in Dune in an assassination attempt on Paul Atreides.
- Hypnobong – Device in the shape of a concave base that induced a drug-like state. According to Reverend Mother Lucilla it is outlawed in most of the civilized worlds.

== I ==
- Inkvine – "Creeping plant native to Giedi Prime and frequently used as a whip in its slave pens. Victims are marked by beet-colored tattoos that cause residual pain for many years."
- Ixian damper – Portable device which hides words from anyone without the proper coded translator, and projects distortions that hide the precise movements of lips and the sounds of voices. It is described as a "black disc" buoyed midair by suspensors.
- Ixian Probe – Device used to capture the thoughts of a person (living or dead) for analysis; can be blocked by the substance shere.

== J ==
- Judge of the Change – "An official appointed by the Landsraad High Council and the Emperor to monitor a change of fief, a kanly negotiation, or formal battle in a War of Assassins. The Judge's arbitral authority may be challenged only before the High Council with the Emperor present."

== K ==
- Kaitain – New homeworld of House Corrino (following the environmental destruction of Salusa Secundus) and capital of the Corrino Empire. Kaitain is also the location of the Imperial Court and Golden Lion Throne, as well as the meeting place of the Landsraad Council.
- Kanly – "Formal feud or vendetta under the rules of the Great Convention carried on according to the strictest limitations". Derived from kanlı, a Turkish word for a blood feud between Islamic tribes of the Caucasus.
- Kralizec – Long-foretold "Typhoon Struggle" or final "battle at the end of the universe".
- Krimskell fiber/Krimskell rope – "The 'claw fiber' woven from strands of the hufuf vine from Ecaz. Knots tied in krimskell will claw tighter and tighter to preset limits when the knot-lines are pulled."
- Kwisatz Haderach – "The Shortening of the Way" or "The one who can be two places simultaneously". Bene Gesserit label applied to "the unknown for which they sought a genetic solution: a male Bene Gesserit whose organic mental powers would bridge space and time." Originating from the Hebrew word kefitzat haderech.

== L ==
- Landsraad – The Assembly of all nobles in the Imperium.
- Lasgun – Handheld energy weapon, technically a "continuous-wave laser projector;" also lasegun. If the beam intersects a defensive shield, a nuclear explosion occurs whose magnitude is impossible to predict.
- Laza tiger – A breed of tiger brought to Salusa Secundus "almost eight thousand years" before the events of Children of Dune. "Genetic manipulation of the ancient Terran stock had erased some of the original tiger features and refined other elements. The fangs remained long. Their faces were wide, eyes alert and intelligent. The paws were enlarged to give them support on uneven terrain and their sheathed claws could extend some ten centimeters, sharpened at the ends into razor tips by abrasive compression of the sheath. Their coats were a flat and even tan which made them almost invisible against sand."
- Levenbrech – A military rank that is roughly in between a sergeant and a lieutenant.
- Lisan al Gaib – (Arabic: لسان الغيب - 'The tongue of the unseen') The Fremen term for an off-world prophet or messiah, applied to Paul Atreides in Dune. It is "The Voice from the Outer World" and is outlined in Fremen messianic legends heavily influenced by the Bene Gesserit's Missionaria Protectiva. It is also translated as the "Giver of Water". A phrase of Arabic origin meaning "Tongue of the Unseen", also title of Hafez.
- Litter – A kind of stretcher or cart that uses anti-gravity suspensors to hover above the ground. Used by Harkonnen troopers to transport Paul and Jessica to a waiting ornithopter in the original novel.
- Little Maker – The "half-plant-half-animal deep-sand vector of the Arrakis sandworm", whose "excretions form the pre-spice mass." Also known as "sandtrout," they represent an early stage in the life cycle of the worm. They can link the cilia on the edges of their bodies to encapsulate pockets of free subsurface water, which is lethal to fully grown worms.
- Lost Tleilaxu – Offshoot race of the Bene Tleilax, formed in the Scattering.

== M ==
- Mahdi – "In the Fremen messianic legend, 'The One Who Will Lead Us to Paradise;'" applied to Paul Atreides by the Fremen when they determine that he is their messiah. The term Mahdi is the same as that used in Islam for a messianic figure who will appear shortly before the Day of Judgment in Islamic eschatology.
- Maker hooks – "The hooks used for capturing, mounting, and steering a sandworm of Arrakis."
- Maula pistol – "Spring-loaded gun for firing poison darts; range about 40 metres."
- Melange – Known colloquially as "the spice", a highly-addictive drug essential to space travel, extended life, and therefore to the survival of the universe.
- Memocorder – Tiny handheld device described as "a dull black Ixian artifact whose existence crowded the proscriptions of the Butlerian Jihad".
- Mentats – Individuals trained as "human computers," their minds developed to staggering heights of cognitive and analytical ability.
- Missionaria Protectiva – An arm of the Bene Gesserit charged with spreading contrived myths, prophecies and superstition on primitive worlds so that the Bene Gesserit may later exploit those regions.
- Muad'Dib – "The adapted kangaroo mouse of Arrakis, a creature associated in the Fremen earth-spirit mythology with a design visible on the planet's second moon. This creature is admired by Fremen for its ability to survive in the open desert." In Dune, Paul Atreides takes "Muad'Dib" as his Fremen name, which takes on greater significance when he is perceived as a messiah. The term originates from the word مؤدب (muʾaddib) meaning "teacher" in Arabic.
- Muadru – Ancient religion predating the Old Empire before the Time of the Titans.

== N ==
- na-Baron – Noble title given to a Baron's heir-apparent.
- No-chamber – Construct that hides anything inside from prescient and oracular vision, as well as other methods of detection.
- No-ship – No-chamber in spaceship form, with enough limited prescience to be capable of interstellar travel without a Guild Navigator.
- Nullentropy – Technology akin to the science fiction concept of stasis, in which the natural processes of time, such as decomposition, are ceased. In this way, perishable matter such as food and even human cells may be stored for millennia and remain undamaged.

== O ==
- Obliterators – Weapons of mass destruction stolen by Honored Matres from their "outside enemy". They combust the atmosphere of a planet, and subsequently its surface.
- Orange Catholic Bible, or OCB – The primary orthodox religious text in the universe, a syncretic fusion of all significant religious concepts in the historical record, created by an ecumenical council. Its supreme commandment is considered to be: "Thou shalt not disfigure the soul."
- Other Memory – The combined ego and memories of all female ancestors, which a Bene Gesserit may be trained to access.
- Ornithopter (or 'Thopter) – "Aircraft capable of sustained wing-beat flight in the manner of birds;" one of the primary modes of transportation on the desert planet Arrakis.

== P ==
- Palm lock – "Lock or seal which can be opened only by contact with the palm of the human hand to which it has been keyed."
- Phibian – Primitive and amphibious humanoid creatures, a genetic mix of human and fish, created out in the Scattering. First mentioned in Chapterhouse: Dune, they have been brought as captives to the "million planets" by the Honored Matres. In Hunters of Dune, Phibians are described as having bullet-shaped heads and lean and streamlined bodies, taller than humans and slick green skin that "shines with oily iridescence". Capable of breathing underwater as well as on land, they are used by the Honored Matres on Buzzell to harvest valuable soostones from the sea.
- Plasteel – Extremely tough form of steel, "stabilized with stravidium fibers grown into its crystal structure."
- Plaz (or windowplaz) – Synthetic glass, used for windows (especially in aircraft and spaceships) due to its superior strength.
- Poison snooper – "Radiation analyzer within the olfactory spectrum and keyed to detect poisonous substances." Said to resemble a dead spider that hangs limply over a table.
- Powindah – Tleilaxu term for all outsiders, whom they consider "unclean" sinners and heretics.
- Prana-bindu – Training providing a Bene Gesserit with complete muscle control (Prana nervature relates to nervous system control).
- Prescience – Form of precognition, based in genetics but made possible by use of the drug melange.
- Pre-spice mass – The "stage of fungusoid wild growth achieved when water is flooded into the excretions of Little Makers. At this stage, the spice of Arrakis forms a characteristic 'blow', exchanging the material from deep underground for the matter on the surface above it. This mass, after exposure to sun and air, becomes melange."
- Probe, Ixian – Device used to capture the thoughts of a person (living or dead) for analysis; can be blocked by the substance shere.
- Probe, T – Device used to capture the thoughts of a person (living or dead) for analysis; unlike an Ixian Probe, it cannot be blocked by the substance shere.
- Pundi rice – "A mutated rice whose grains, high in natural sugar, achieve lengths up to four centimeters; chief export of Caladan."

== Q ==
- Qanat – "Open canal for carrying irrigation water under controlled conditions through a desert."

== R ==
- Rachag – A "caffeine-type stimulant from the yellow berries of Akarso."
- Residual poison – "Innovation attributed to the Mentat Piter De Vries whereby the body is impregnated with a substance for which repeated antidotes must be administered; withdrawal of the antidote at any time brings death."
- Reverend Mother – Bene Gesserit who has survived a ritual wherein she consciously transforms a toxic dose of melange into a non-poisonous substance at the molecular level, thereby raising herself to a higher level of awareness and enabling her to access Other Memory.
- Rossak drug – A precursor to the Water of Life, used by the Sisterhood of Rossak to unlock Other Memory.

== S ==
- Salusan bull – Fierce and very aggressive creature with compound eyes and multiple horns, used in bullfighting on Caladan and originating from Salusa Secundus.
- Salusa Secundus – Original homeworld of House Corrino. Later devastated by atomics, it eventually became the Emperor’s prison planet and a training ground for his elite Sardaukar military forces.
- Sandworm – Giant sand-dwelling creatures native to Arrakis. Called Shai-Hulud (and sometimes Little Maker) by the Fremen and worshipped as deities.
- Sapho – "High-energy liquid extracted from barrier roots of Ecaz. Commonly used by Mentats who claim it amplifies mental powers. Users develop deep ruby stains on mouth and lips."
- Sardaukar – Ferocious "soldier-fanatics" of the Padishah Emperor, later disbanded by Leto II.
- Sareer – Last desert of Arrakis in the time of Leto II Atreides, location of his Citadel; guarded by D-wolves.
- Sayyadina – Among the Fremen, the Sayyadina ("Friend of God" in Chakobsa) is a priestess who has not yet passed within to become a Reverend Mother. When a Sayyadina undergoes the spice agony, another is then consecrated into the Sayyadina to continue the line of succession.
- Scattering, The – Event after the reign of Leto II in which trillions of people left the settled worlds of the Old Empire, striking off into unknown space.
- Semuta – "Second narcotic derivative (by crystal extraction) from the burned residue of elacca wood [from Ecaz]. The effect (described as timeless, sustained ecstasy) is elicited by certain atonal vibrations referred to as semuta music."
- Servo-receiver – A communications device worn in the ear. In Dune, Shaddam wears one during the Battle of Arrakeen to receive updates on the battle.
- Shai-Hulud – Fremen name for the sandworms of Arrakis. Originating from the Arabic words meaning "thing of eternity" (شيء خلود šayʾ khulūd).
- Shere – A substance which, when present in the body at high enough concentrations, will block the use of an Ixian Probe (but not a T-Probe) from recovering memories.
- Shigawire – "Metallic extrusion of a ground vine (Narvi narviium) grown only on Salusa Secundus and III Delta Kaising. It is noted for extreme tensile strength" and is used as a recording medium as well as a garrote weapon.
- Sietch – Cave warren inhabited by a Fremen tribal community; in the Fremen language, "Place of assembly in time of danger." The name was borrowed from the sich of the Zaporozhian Cossacks. "Sietch Tabr" combines the Ukrainian Cossack words sich and tabor or "wagon fort".
- Sietch orgy (or sietch tau orgy) – "The culmination of the Fremen Water of Life ritual. Once a Reverend Mother has converted the water from its poisonous state, the Fremen then drink of the changed water, which has narcotic properties." Fremen partaking in the ritual "receive release from some of their pent-up emotions" and wild dancing or even sexual activity may occur.
- Siridar – A planetary governor.
- Slig – A livestock animal which is the hybrid of a large slug and a pig, created by the Tleilaxu and considered a culinary delicacy. The Tleilaxu themselves do not consume the animals, having designed them to facilitate what they see as the degrading decadence and spiritual bankruptcy of all cultures but their own.
- Solari – The official currency and principal monetary unit used throughout the Corrino Empire and, presumably, the Known Universe. Often used in parallel with spice as a form of payment. Implied to still be in use at the time of the accession of Leto II, as well as in the years following his death.
- Solido – "Three-dimensional image from a solido projector using 360-degree reference signals imprinted on a shigawire reel."
- Soostone – Valuable iridescent gem produced on Buzzell by the abraded carapaces of monoped sea creatures called Cholisters, much in the manner of pearls.
- Spacing Guild – Powerful organization with a monopoly on space travel and transport due to their Navigators.
- Spice – Common name for melange, a highly-addictive drug essential to space travel, extended life, and therefore to the survival of the universe.
- Spice agony – Fremen version of the ritual used by the Bene Gesserit to create Reverend Mothers, using the Water of Life instead of melange.
- Starship Lighter or Space Lighter – A class of spacecraft that functions similarly to a ferry or barge, and serves to shuttle people and cargo between a larger ship such as a Guild Heighliner and a planet’s surface.
- Steersman – Title given to Guild Navigators.
- Stillsuit – "Body-enclosing garment" of Fremen design which performs the "functions of heat dissipation and filtering bodily wastes," as well as retaining and reclaiming moisture.
- Stilltent – "Small, scalable enclosure of micro-sandwich fabric designed to reclaim as potable water the ambient moisture discharged within it by the breath of its occupants."
- Stone burner – Atomic weapon, the explosion and radiation of which can be precisely adjusted depending on the desired effect. A stone burner with sufficient fuel can burn through the crust of a planet to the mantle or core, potentially causing a release of energy destroying the surface of the planet on which the weapon is deployed. Stone burners emit "J-Rays," a form of radiation that has a side effect of destroying the eyes of anyone surviving the initial radiation blast.
- S'tori – Tleilaxu concept, derived from Japanese satori (悟り), spiritual awakening. "To achieve s'tori, no understanding is needed. S'tori exists without words, without even a name."
- Suboid – Bioengineered Ixian workers.
- Suk School – Prominent medical school whose doctors are the universe's most competent and trusted; those who have received the "Suk Imperial Conditioning" bear a diamond tattoo on their foreheads, wear their hair in a special silver ring, and are incapable of inflicting harm. However, the fallibility of Suk training is proven in Dune (1965) when Baron Vladimir Harkonnen and his twisted Mentat Piter De Vries manage to subvert this conditioning and coerce Suk Dr. Wellington Yueh into helping him in his attempt to destroy House Atreides.
- Suspensor – Any of a number of 'hovering' devices which utilize the "secondary (low-drain) phase of a Holtzman field generator" to nullify gravity "within certain limits prescribed by relative mass and energy consumption." In Dune, the obese Baron Harkonnen uses suspensors to support his massive weight. Hunter-seekers also use suspensor fields for propulsion, which make them slippery and hard to grasp.

== T ==
- T-Probe – Device used to capture the thoughts of a person (living or dead) for analysis. Shere only prevents the T-Probe from recovering memories directly (as it does for the Ixian Probe) and does not impede any of the other features. The model created by the operation of this probe can be interrogated to give an idea of how the person would have reacted to a set of stimuli, possibly giving insight into a shere-loaded prisoner.
- Tabr – from the Ukrainian Cossack word tabor or "wagon fort"; see also sietch.
- Tachyon net (or tachyon web) – Technology (involving faster-than-light tachyon particles) used by Daniel and Marty in their attempt to track and capture the no-ship Ithaca.
- Thinking machines – Intelligent and sentient machines "created in the likeness of a human mind" and thus abolished in the Butlerian Jihad.
- Thalim – Star of the single planet system of the Tleilaxu.
- Thopter (Ornithopter) – "Aircraft capable of sustained wing-beat flight in the manner of birds."
- Thorse – A six-legged pack animal bred for its stability.
- Thumper – "Short stake with a spring-driven clapper at one end", placed in the sand to 'call' sandworms, who are attracted to vibration and sound.
- Titans – Ancient dictators whose brains were transplanted into fearsome, weaponized machine bodies to achieve immortality.
- Tleilaxu (or Bene Tleilax) – Secretive and powerful patriarchal race known for their genetic manipulation technologies.
- Truthsayer – Bene Gesserit Reverend Mother "qualified to enter truthtrance and detect insincerity or falsehood".

== U ==
- Umma – "One of the brotherhood of prophets; a term of scorn in the Imperium, meaning any 'wild' person given to fanatical prediction."
- Usul – Fremen word, meaning "The strength at the base of the pillar." This is the secret "sietch name" (known only to his tribe) given to Paul Atreides upon his joining the Fremen.

== V ==
- Verite – Will-destroying narcotic from Ecaz that "renders a person incapable of falsehood." Originating from the French word for "truth"
- The Voice – Training that allows the Bene Gesserit "to control others merely by selected tone shadings of the voice."

== W ==
- Wali – The name the Fremen give to an untried youth.
- War of Assassins – Regulated form of warfare between noble houses, intended to "reduce involvement of innocent bystanders." The rules require "formal declarations of intent and restrict permissible weapons."
- Water of Life – Toxic liquid exhalation of a drowning sandworm, used by Fremen Reverend Mothers in the spice agony.
- Water rings – Metal rings wore by Fremen women to indicate the amount of water possessed by their households.
- Weirding way – Fremen term for Bene Gesserit abilities, in particular the specialized martial art component of prana-bindu.
- Whale fur – Valuable commodity noted to be the original source of House Harkonnen's wealth. Princess Irulan is described wearing whale fur multiple times, including during her meeting with her fellow conspirators in Dune Messiah. The Prelude to Dune prequel series establishes it to be the fur of the Bjondax whales of Lankiveil, a planet controlled by the Harkonnens.
- Windowplaz (or simply plaz) – Synthetic glass, used for windows (especially in aircraft and spaceships) due to its superior strength.
- Windtrap – Type of air well "placed in the path of a prevailing wind and capable of precipitating moisture from the air caught within it, usually by a sharp and distinct drop in temperature within the trap."

== Y ==
- Yali – "A Fremen's personal quarters within the sietch."

== Z ==
- Zensunni – Ancient religious sect, ancestors of the Fremen.

== See also ==
- List of technology in the Dune universe
