= Organizations of the Dune universe =

Details of the Dune science fiction novels

Young Alia Atreides in front of (from left to right) a Spacing Guild agent, Princess Irulan, Reverend Mother Gaius Helen Mohiam and her Bene Gesserit, and Padishah Emperor Shaddam IV, from the 2000 Dune miniseries

Multiple organizations of the Dune universe dominate the political, religious, and social arena of the setting of Frank Herbert's Dune series of science fiction novels, and derivative works. Set tens of thousands of years in the future, the saga chronicles a civilization which has banned computers but has also developed advanced technology and mental and physical abilities through physical training, eugenics and the use of the drug melange. Specialized groups of individuals have aligned themselves in organizations focusing on specific abilities, technology and goals. Herbert's concepts of human evolution and technology have been analyzed and deconstructed in at least one book, The Science of Dune (2008). His originating 1965 novel Dune is popularly considered one of the greatest science fiction novels of all time, and is frequently cited as the best-selling science fiction novel in history. Dune and its five sequels by Herbert explore the complex and multilayered interactions of politics, religion, ecology, and technology, among other themes.

== Overview ==
We've a three-point civilization: The Imperial Household balanced against the Federated Great Houses of the Landsraad, and between them, the Guild with its damnable monopoly on interstellar transport.

— Reverend Mother Gaius Helen Mohiam, Dune

As Frank Herbert's Dune (1965) begins, the known universe is ruled by Shaddam IV, the 81st Padishah Emperor of House Corrino, whose power is secured by his control of the Sardaukar, his brutally efficient military force. Imperial power is balanced by the assembly of noble houses called the Landsraad, which enforces the Great Convention's ban on the use of atomics against human targets. Though the power of House Corrino is unrivaled by any other individual House, they are in constant competition with each other for political power and stakes in the omnipresent CHOAM company, a directorship which controls the wealth of the entire Empire. The third primary power in the universe is the Spacing Guild, which monopolizes interstellar travel and banking through its proprietary use of melange-mutated Guild Navigators who perform the necessary computations to safely navigate "folded space".

The matriarchal Bene Gesserit possess almost superhuman physical, sensory, and deductive powers developed through years of physical and mental conditioning. While positioning themselves to serve mankind, the Bene Gesserit pursue their goal to better the human race by subtly and secretly guiding and manipulating human bloodlines and the affairs of others to serve their own purposes. "Human computers" known as Mentats have been developed and perfected to replace the capacity for logical analysis lost through the prohibition of computers. The Bene Tleilax are amoral merchants who traffic in biological and genetically engineered products such as artificial eyes, "twisted" Mentats and a type of clone called a ghola. Finally, the Ixians produce cutting-edge technology that seemingly complies with (but sometimes pushes the boundaries of) the prohibitions against computers, thinking machines and conscious robots put in place 10,000 years before as a result of the Butlerian Jihad. The doctors of the Suk School are the universe's most competent and trusted; those who have received the "Suk Imperial Conditioning" are incapable of inflicting harm. The Swordmasters of Ginaz are an elite group of master swordsmen whose fighting skills are prized and unmatched. Equally fierce in battle are the native Fremen of the desert planet Arrakis, known as Dune. Naturally honed to excellence in harsh conditions rivaling the planet on which the Imperial Sardaukar are trained, the Fremen are misunderstood and underestimated by the other powers in the universe.

Arrakis is the only natural source of the all-important spice melange, and by leading the Fremen to seize control of the planet in Dune, Paul Atreides is able to depose Shaddam and become ruler of the known universe. With a bloody jihad subsequently unleashed across the universe in Paul's name but out of his control, the Bene Gesserit, Tleilaxu, Spacing Guild and House Corrino plot to dethrone him in Dune Messiah (1969). Seeing the eventual extinction of mankind through prescient vision, in Children of Dune (1976) Paul's son Leto II devises an extended plan to save humanity, but becomes a symbiote with the sandworm of Arrakis to gain the long lifespan needed to see this plan to its end.

Thirty-five hundred years later in God Emperor of Dune (1981), Leto still rules the universe as a 'benevolent tyrant', with the help of his all-female army, the Fish Speakers. He forbids any spiritual outlets other than his own compulsory religion, and maintains a tight monopoly on melange and space travel. Through his own selective breeding program among the descendants of his twin sister Ghanima, Leto finally achieves Siona, whose actions are hidden from prescient vision. He engineers his own assassination, knowing it will result in rebellion and revolt but also in an explosion in travel and colonization. The resultant chaos and severe famine on many worlds cause trillions of humans to set off into the freedom of unknown space and spread out across the universe in a diaspora later called the Scattering.

Fifteen hundred years later, as Heretics of Dune (1984) begins, the balance of power in the Empire rests among the Ixians, the Bene Gesserit, and the Tleilaxu. The Spacing Guild has been forever weakened by the development of Ixian machines capable of navigation in foldspace, practically replacing Guild Navigators. Ixians are at their apex with their alliance with the Fish Speakers; but Bene Gesserit analysts see them as a failing power, because Ixian society has become a bureaucracy and no great inventions have come out of the workshops of Ix for centuries. The Bene Gesserit control the sandworms and their planet, now called Rakis, through their influence over the Rakian Priesthood that worships the sandworms as the Divided God, Leto II, and now actively participate on interstellar politics and even have their own standing armies. But the Tleilaxu have also discovered how to synthetically produce melange, and they are preparing to subjugate the rest of humanity. As a large influx of people begin to return from the Scattering, the Bene Gesserit find their match in a violent and corrupt matriarchal society known as the Honored Matres. A bitter and bloody war erupts between the orders, but in Chapterhouse: Dune (1985) it ultimately becomes clear that joining the two organizations into a single New Sisterhood with shared abilities is their best chance at survival against the approaching enemy, who had driven the Honored Matres into the Old Empire.

== Bene Gesserit ==
The Bene Gesserit are a key social, religious, and political force in Frank Herbert's science fiction Dune universe. The matriarchal group is described as a secretive and exclusive sisterhood whose members train their bodies and minds through years of physical and mental conditioning to obtain superhuman powers and abilities that can seem magical to outsiders. Under the guise of humbly "serving" the Empire, the Sisterhood is in fact a major power in the universe, using its many areas of influence to subtly guide mankind along the path of their own plan for humanity's future. The Bene Gesserit also have a secret, millennia-long selective breeding program to bolster and preserve valuable skills and bloodlines as well as to produce a theoretical superhuman male they call the Kwisatz Haderach.

== Bene Tleilax ==
The Bene Tleilax, (adjective for its adherents or creations: Tleilaxu) /tleɪˈlæksuː/, are an extremely xenophobic and isolationist society in the Dune universe. Genetic manipulators who traffic in biological products such as artificial eyes, gholas, and "twisted" Mentats, the Tleilaxu are a major power in the Imperium. The race is ruled by a small council of Tleilaxu Masters, whose genetically engineered Face Dancer servants have the ability to mimic any human. The Masters themselves possess a bland and diminutive appearance intended to cause other races to underestimate them. In Heretics of Dune (1984), it is revealed that they are a secret totalitarian theocracy, ultimately seeking domination of the universe. Despite their influence, the Bene Tleilax are universally distrusted and inspire disgust because their products, though desirable, push the moral limits of what humanity at large considers acceptable and can involve extensive physiological and physical manipulation of human life.

After Dune Messiah (1969), the Tleilaxu have the ability to regain their genetic memory with ease, allowing them to live forever, using their axlotl tanks to create gholas of themselves. In Heretics of Dune, it is noted that Tleilaxu sperm "does not carry forward in a straight genetic fashion ... Gaps occur", and that they are "naturally immune to an Ixian Probe", an interrogation device which normally can extract information even from the dead. The Tleilaxu are described as short, dwarf-like characters with gray skin, hair and eyes, elfin features, and pointy teeth. Masters control their creations by forcing them into a hypnotic state with a predefined, implanted sound (often a specific humming or whistling noise). In Dune Messiah, the Tleilaxu dwarf Bijaz controls the ghola Hayt through a specific humming intonation that renders Hayt open to implanted commands. In Heretics of Dune, the Master Waff attempts to control his perfectly mimicked Face Dancer copy of High Priest Hedley Tuek with a humming language, but fails due to the copy's complete assimilation into its new form.

=== The original series ===
The Tleilaxu control a number of planets but are originally connected with Tleilax, the sole planet of the star Thalim. Herbert's 1965 novel Dune notes that the Tleilaxu are the source of twisted Mentats. Baron Harkonnen states his intent to "send at once to Tleilax for a new Mentat" after Piter De Vries is killed. The Tleilaxu themselves step into the foreground in Dune Messiah as their Face Dancer Scytale enters into a conspiracy with the Bene Gesserit, Spacing Guild, and House Corrino to topple the rule of Paul Atreides. To this end, the Tleilaxu resurrect Paul's dead friend Duncan Idaho as the ghola Hayt, trained as a Mentat. Hayt's function is to unwittingly destroy Paul psychologically and, failing that, kill Paul when triggered by an implanted command. The emotional stress of this assassination attempt unlocks Duncan's memories in Hayt, which Scytale uses to illustrate that the Tleilaxu can provide Paul with a fully realized ghola of his deceased concubine Chani, in exchange for his abdication. Paul refuses and kills Scytale. Duncan further ponders the Tleilaxu legacy of his creation in Children of Dune (1976).

Over 3,500 years later, in God Emperor of Dune (1981), Tleilaxu Face Dancers kill and replace nearly everyone in the Ixian embassy on Arrakis as part of an assassination attempt on Paul's seemingly immortal son, the God Emperor Leto II Atreides. The Tleilaxu have been providing Leto with Duncan Idaho gholas for centuries, and their plot fails in part due to the ingenuity of the latest Duncan. Another 1,500 years later in Heretics of Dune (1984), the Tleilaxu routinely provide the Bene Gesserit with Duncan Idaho gholas, and have also developed the ability to grow the spice melange in the same axlotl tanks they use to grow gholas. Secretly a theistic Zensunni society, the Tleilaxu believe they are on the brink of taking control of the Imperium. They have perfected their Face Dancers, who are now perfect mimics, able to copy the memories and consciousness of the people they imitate. Virtually undetectable to all but the Bene Gesserit, these Face Dancers begin to replace leaders in the Imperium as a means for the Tleilaxu to seize control. The plan fails as, over time, the Face Dancers come to believe they are the people they have copied and elude their genetically programmed loyalty to the Tleilaxu Masters. Leto II's death had spawned a widespread diaspora known as the Scattering, and in Heretics of Dune the descendants of "lost" Tleilaxu return from the Scattering. Tleilaxu leader Waff does not fully trust these newcomers, noting that "their accents were strange, their manners even stranger and their observances of the rituals questionable." And though he believes the so-called Lost Ones may be religiously tainted by their time away, he is willing to overlook this because of the valuable information they have brought with them. In particular, they have made it possible for the Tleilaxu to condition their latest Duncan Idaho ghola to possess a sexual imprinting ability to match that of the fierce, domination-hungry Honored Matres.

By the events of Chapterhouse: Dune (1985), the Bene Tleilax have been all but eradicated by the Honored Matres save for one Master, Scytale. He is a ghola of the original Scytale of Dune Messiah, somehow having ascended from Face Dancer to Master. He tells the Bene Gesserit leader Darwi Odrade how the Lost Ones brought back captive Futars, hybrids of human and cat, which could not be reproduced in axlotl tanks. Both Odrade and Scytale realize this was a ploy of the descendant Tleilaxu to gain the confidence of the Masters and yet not divulge their secrets. Scytale's secret bargaining tool, while held against his will by the Bene Gesserit is a hidden nullentropy capsule containing cells carefully and secretly collected by the Tleilaxu for millennia, including the cells of Tleilaxu Masters, Face Dancers, Paul Atreides, Chani, Gurney Halleck, Thufir Hawat and other legendary figures. He intends to not only grow his own life-sustaining ghola, but to resurrect the rest of his order as well. In the meantime, he has given the Bene Gesserit enough of the axlotl technology to produce melange and grow their own gholas, in particular a replacement for their military genius Miles Teg.

=== Sequels ===
In Brian Herbert and Kevin J. Anderson's 2006 continuation of the original series, Hunters of Dune, the descendant Tleilaxu, now called the Lost Tleilaxu, have avoided extermination by the Honored Matres through a shaky alliance with them. The Lost Tleilaxu council of Elders is served by a subgroup of advanced Face Dancers, led by Khrone, who cannot be detected by even the Bene Gesserit. Despite having the technology to create gholas, the Lost Tleilaxu do not know how to manufacture melange in axlotl tanks, the process for which died with the original Tleilaxu Masters. Their immediate goal is to rediscover this secret to break the Bene Gesserit monopoly. However, the Lost Tleilaxu leadership has been infiltrated and overtaken by Khrone's Face Dancers, and soon, the last true Elder, Burah, is killed. The Face Dancers have also secretly gained control of many similar power bases across the Old Empire.

A minion of the powerful independent Face Dancers Daniel and Marty, Khrone joins them in their pursuit of the Ithaca, the no-ship that escaped the Bene Gesserit in Chapterhouse: Dune. They have calculated that it contains something or someone important to their victory in the coming final battle to conquer the human race. Meanwhile, Scytale, still a prisoner of the Bene Gesserit on the wandering Ithaca, manages to negotiate permission to grow a ghola of himself. Khrone sends second-rank Lost Tleilaxu Uxtal, who had served as secretary to Elder Burah, to the former Tleilaxu capital, Bandalong, now ruled by renegade Honored Matre leader Hellica. Uxtal is tasked to pacify Hellica by producing the orange adrenaline-enhancing drug used by the Honored Matres with axlotl technology. Khrone, however, has his own agenda for domination of the universe and believes that, like the Tleilaxu, Daniel and Marty can be fooled.

While the universe at large is unaware that the no-ship carries the secret to producing melange in axlotl tanks, The Guild Navigator Edrik comes to Uxtal on Tleilax, seeking this knowledge. New Ixian navigation technology, secretly masterminded by Khrone, threatens the Spacing Guild's own monopoly on interstellar travel, and the Bene Gesserit control the melange supply. Uxtal is eventually able to access the genetic material of deceased Master Waff and, through an accelerated process, creates several (ultimately flawed) Waff gholas, hoping to unlock the secret of producing melange in the tanks. The Bene Gesserit New Sisterhood conquers Tleilax, Uxtal is devoured by hungry sligs, and the sole remaining Waff ghola escapes. He finds refuge with the Spacing Guild, offering Edrik something better than artificial melange: the genetic knowledge for the Guild to create their own, optimized sandworms, the natural origin of the spice cycle. Daniel and Marty are revealed to be new incarnations of humankind's ancient enemy, thinking machine leader Omnius and his second-in-command Erasmus, introduced in the Legends of Dune prequel trilogy by Brian Herbert and Anderson.

In the series finale, Sandworms of Dune (2007), it is revealed that Khrone and his legions of autonomous Face Dancers seek to overthrow their machine "masters". Secretly in control of Ix and its technology production, Khrone manipulates the Spacing Guild and New Sisterhood, setting them up for disastrous failure in their final battle against the thinking machine forces of Omnius. When Khrone asserts dominance over even the machine empire, a smug Erasmus activates a fail-safe built into all enhanced Face Dancers, instantly killing Khrone and all of his minions across the universe.

=== Prequels ===
In the Prelude to Dune (1999–2001) prequel trilogy by Brian Herbert and Anderson, it is noted that the founder of the Bene Tleilax had been a Master named Xuttuh. Master Hidar Fen Ajidica heads Project Amal, an early attempt by the Bene Tleilax to create synthetic melange in order to eliminate dependence upon the planet Arrakis, intending an eventual Tleilaxu takeover of the universe, Ajidica sends "improved" Face Dancers off to unexplored systems. The ancestors of the Bene Tleilax are featured in the Legends of Dune (2002–2004) prequel series by Brian Herbert and Anderson. They are a civilization of human merchants known as the "Tlulaxa", specializing in slaves and replacement organs. They claim that the organs are grown artificially in organ farms, but in reality, the vast majority of the organs are harvested from slaves. The Tlulaxa do have working organ farms, but they are used mainly as a front for slave harvesting operations and provide only a small fraction of the replacement organs.

=== Emperor: Battle for Dune ===
The Tleilaxu are one of the five subfactions in the 2001 computer game Emperor: Battle for Dune.

== CHOAM ==
The flag of CHOAM, based on its description in Dune (1965)

The Combine Honnete Ober Advancer Mercantiles (CHOAM) is a universal development corporation in Frank Herbert's science fiction Dune universe, first mentioned in the 1965 novel Dune. CHOAM controls all economic affairs across the cosmos, though it is still at the mercy of the Spacing Guild's monopoly on interstellar travel. In a 1980 article, Herbert equated CHOAM with OPEC, the real-world intergovernmental organization which is a major power in the petroleum industry. He writes in Dune:

"Few products escape the CHOAM touch ... Logs, donkeys, horses, cows, lumber, dung, sharks, whale fur — the most prosaic and the most exotic ... even our poor pundi rice from Caladan. Anything the Guild will transport, the art forms of Ecaz, the machines of Richese and Ix. But all fades before melange. A handful of spice will buy a home on Tupile. It cannot be manufactured, it must be mined on Arrakis. It is unique and it has true geriatric properties ... But the important thing is to consider all the Houses that depend on CHOAM profits. And think of the enormous proportion of those profits dependent upon a single product — the spice. Imagine what would happen if something should reduce spice production. — Duke Leto Atreides, Dune

CHOAM's management and board of directors are controlled by the Padishah Emperor and the Landsraad, the assembly of noble Houses, with the Spacing Guild and the Bene Gesserit as silent partners. Because of its control of interplanetary commerce, CHOAM is the largest single source of wealth in the Empire; as such, influence in CHOAM is a central goal of political maneuvering. In Dune, Herbert notes:

"You have no idea how much wealth is involved, Feyd," the Baron said. "Not in your wildest imaginings. To begin, we'll have an irrevocable directorship in the CHOAM Company."
Feyd-Rautha nodded. Wealth was the thing. CHOAM was the key to wealth, each noble House dipping from the company's coffers whatever it could under the power of the directorships. Those CHOAM directorships — they were the real evidence of political power in the Imperium, passing with the shifts of voting strength within the Landsraad as it balanced itself against the Emperor and his supporters.

Before the climactic battle in Dune, Paul Atreides and the Fremen watch the Padishah Emperor's encampment to see whether he will raise the Atreides flag, indicating a recognition of Paul's claims, or the banner of Paul's Harkonnen enemies. Instead, the Emperor raises the flag of CHOAM, as a reminder to all of the combatant parties that economics trump political considerations.

In 2011, Forbes ranked CHOAM as the largest fictional corporation.

=== Prequels ===
In the Great Schools of Dune novels that take place eight decades after the end of the Butlerian Jihad, Josef Venport, the director of Venport Holdings (Venhold), the largest foldspace transportation company in the universe and the only company utilizing Navigators, forms Combined Mercantiles to mine spice on Arrakis. While ostensibly an independent company, it's an open secret that Combined Mercantiles works for Venhold. Presumably, the company eventually evolves into CHOAM.

== Fish Speakers ==
The Fish Speakers are the all-female army of the God Emperor Leto II Atreides in Frank Herbert's science fiction Dune universe, appearing primarily in God Emperor of Dune (1981). Named so because "the first priestesses spoke to fish in their dreams," the organization is founded by Leto after the events of Children of Dune (1976).

In Dune (1965), Leto II's father Paul Atreides overthrows Padishah Emperor Shaddam IV when Paul's fierce Fremen army manages to defeat Shaddam's previously-unstoppable Sardaukar forces. Though the religiously loyal Fremen and the remnants of the Sardaukar are later at Leto's disposal, Leto (possessing the life experiences of his ancestors over millennia through Other Memory) has come to believe that male-dominated military organizations are essentially predatory and will turn on the civilian population in the absence of an external enemy. Ruling for 3,500 years as a human-sandworm hybrid, Leto molds his Fish Speaker army into both a military and religious force that also functions as the bureaucracy for his tyrannical empire. As Leto sees his Golden Path for humanity's survival from extinction coming to fruition, he allows himself to be assassinated at the end of God Emperor of Dune (1981). Control of the Fish Speakers passes to Duncan Idaho and Siona Atreides.

By the time of Heretics of Dune (1984), the influence of the Fish Speakers has significantly waned in comparison to the Bene Gesserit, Bene Tleilax, and Ixians, the latter two now having great control over the Fish Speakers. By then, the Fish Speakers have also incorporated men into their ranks, and have little in common with the force maintained by Leto II in terms of philosophy or practices. Also by this time, many of the leaders of the Fish Speakers have been replaced with Tleilaxu Face Dancers, essentially making the Fish Speakers, and the realms under their domain, puppets of the Tleilaxu. In Chapterhouse: Dune (1985), the unlocking of Murbella's Other Memory confirms the Bene Gesserit's suspicions that the violent Honored Matres are descendants of Fish Speakers and Bene Gesserit who had fled into the Scattering following Leto's death.

== Fremen ==
The Fremen are a secretive and misunderstood tribe of humans in the Dune universe. As the resident population of the desert planet Arrakis – who came there after thousands of years of wandering the universe – when Dune (1965) begins they have been long overlooked by the rest of the Imperium and are considered backward savages; in reality they are an extremely hardy people and exist in large numbers, their culture built around the commodity of water, which is extremely scarce on Arrakis.

== Honored Matres ==
The Honored Matres are a fictional matriarchal organization in Frank Herbert's science fiction Dune universe, described as an aggressive cult obsessed with power, violence, and sexual domination. They are a renegade off-shoot of the Bene Gesserit that develops in the diaspora known as the Scattering, which occurs after the death of the tyrant Leto II Atreides in God Emperor of Dune (1981).

After Leto II's death, the galaxy-spanning Imperium collapses, according to his plan. Representatives from each major race and order of the Empire spread out beyond the known universe in fleets of untraceable no-ships, beginning the journey along Leto II's Golden Path to save mankind from destruction. Freed from millennia of forced stagnation, trillions of people within the Old Empire flee into unexplored space, "scattering" humanity over a volume of space exponentially larger than the Old Empire itself. Over the next 1,500 years these isolated explorers and colonists develop into their own new cultures.

One of the major powers that arises during the Scattering are the "Honored Matres", theorized to have originated from a fusion of Bene Gesserit missionaries and members of Leto II's all-female military force known as the Fish Speakers. Their name is derived from the Bene Gesserit rank of "Reverend Mother". While the Bene Gesserit seek to manipulate power from the shadows, the militaristic Honored Matres seek direct control through ruthless conquest. In Heretics of Dune (1984), set 1,500 years after the death of Leto II and 5,000 years after the time of Paul Atreides, the Honored Matres suddenly return to the known space of the former Imperium, wreaking havoc and leaving destruction in their wake.

The Honored Matres conquer and rule through sexual enslavement, sheer physical power and the terror inspired by their draconian methods. They are completely without mercy and quick to anger, often resorting to extreme measures of violence in the face of the slightest provocations. The leadership succession practices employed by the order are also severe: a subordinate sister who manages to kill the leader, the so-called Great Honored Matre or Matre Superior, takes her place. The Honored Matres exercise a form of fighting similar to what the Bene Gesserit refer to as prana-bindu, but they execute movement at a speed that far outmatches that of their Bene Gesserit contemporaries. This is coupled with their fighting style, known as Hormu, which is centered on the use of kicks to weak points on the body. The combination of these produces a warrior that is superhumanly fast and more than a match for any fully trained Reverend Mother in direct combat. In addition to their extremely violent tendencies, the Honored Matres are characterized by sexual imprinting abilities far superior to those of Bene Gesserit Imprinters. The Honored Matres are able to imprint a man sexually by amplifying his orgasmic response to such an ecstatic height that the victim of an imprinting becomes "addicted" to his imprinter, thereby becoming a willing slave of the Honored Matre who "marks" him. As the Bene Gesserit rely on melange and its many beneficial properties, the Honored Matres employ (and are similarly addicted to) a different drug that stimulates the production of adrenaline and other chemicals typically produced by the body when experiencing pain. In addition to heightening the senses and responses of a user, this stimulant causes the eyes of an addict to be covered in flecks of orange when agitated, and when an addict is completely enraged the eyes are consumed by the color orange.

Focusing on refining their martial abilities compared to the Bene Gesserit, the Honored Matres lose several of the Bene Gesserit's non-martial skills. Honored Matres are capable of using combinations of language and tone in order to compel listeners into obedience on a subconscious level, but nowhere near as potently as the Bene Gesserit Voice. Most importantly, the Honored Matres lack the precise control over their internal chemistry possessed by the Bene Gesserit, making them vulnerable to toxins and disease in ways the Bene Gesserit are not. The returning Honored Matres actively seek to forcibly regain these skills from the Bene Gesserit, leading Lucilla to discern that the Honored Matres are in fact fleeing back to the space of the old Imperium, after being defeated by enemies that used biological warfare against them.

Tleilaxu Master Waff notes that Honored Matres are "far more terrible than Reverend Mothers of the Bene Gesserit." Scholar Kara Kennedy views the Honored Matres, in the context of the discussion of women's sexual agency in the novels, as "a foil to the Bene Gesserits' attitude towards sexuality".

In Heretics of Dune, the Honored Matres capture the teenage Duncan Idaho ghola, who is loyal to their enemies, the Bene Gesserit. Young Honored Matre Murbella is tasked to use her sexual imprinting talents to enslave Duncan to force his allegiance to them. The Tleilaxu have secretly programmed the ghola with the male equivalent to the imprinting power of the Honored Matres, which is unlocked by Murbella's attempt. Duncan and Murbella imprint each other, and in her weakened condition Murbella is easily captured by the Bene Gesserit. Following a Bene Gesserit plan, Miles Teg goads the Honored Matres into destroying the desert planet Arrakis, the only source of melange. The Bene Gesserit have, however, escaped with a single sandworm, which they will use to restart the spice cycle on their own secret homeworld. In Chapterhouse Dune (1985), the Honored Matres have destroyed all Tleilaxu worlds and have targeted the Bene Gesserit. They intend to assimilate the technology and superhuman skills of the Sisterhood, and then exterminate them. The Honored Matres capture and torture as many Bene Gesserit Reverend Mothers as possible to glean their secrets, while the Bene Gesserit hope to decipher their new enemies' motives, and learn enough about the fearsome Honored Matres to defeat them. It is also revealed that the Honored Matres are fleeing a powerful "unknown enemy" who had conquered their own massive empire out in the Scattering. Murbella decides to join the Bene Gesserit. During a Bene Gesserit attack on the Honored Matres, Murbella kills the Great Honored Matre Logno with her Bene Gesserit-enhanced fighting skills, and the Honored Matres are awed by her physical prowess. The Bene Gesserit Mother Superior Darwi Odrade is also killed, and Murbella secures the leadership of both groups, per Odrade's plan. Murbella intends to merge the two orders into a New Sisterhood, which displeases some women on both sides.

=== Sequels ===
The Honored Matres also appear in Hunters of Dune (2006) and Sandworms of Dune (2007) by Brian Herbert and Kevin J. Anderson, which conclude the original series. Joining forces under Murbella's rule, both the Honored Matres and Bene Gesserit struggle to coexist. Renegade Honored Matres still persist, led by Matre Superior Hellica and maintaining strongholds on captured worlds such as Buzzell, Gammu and Tleilax. Over the course of twenty years, Murbella leads the Sisterhood against the renegades, culminating in the Battle of Tleilax, where Hellica is killed and the planet is completely destroyed. Killing Hellica, Murbella discovers that she is in fact a Face Dancer duplicate. With the fall of Tleilax, and the revelation of Face Dancer infiltration, the unbalanced and vindictive breed of Honored Matres is crushed. Murbella soon learns the "missing link" in the origin of the Honored Matres by exploring their past through Other Memory. Initially a hybrid group of Bene Gesserit and Fish Speakers, they had developed their violent tendencies with their third addition: awakened Tleilaxu females. The best kept secret of the Tleilaxu—that their famed axlotl tanks are in fact their race's females kept in a vegetative state—had been laid bare before the matriarchal alliance, and their wrath had known no bounds. Attacking every Tleilaxu planet on their way out of the galaxy, the martial prowess of both the Fish Speakers and the Bene Gesserit had ensured their victory. They had managed to liberate a number of the axlotl tanks, and their next task had been to rehabilitate the brain-dead women. The fledgling order had enjoyed a modicum of success, and eventually the Tleilaxu females, angry at their males for treating them in such a way, had vowed revenge. Thus, when the Honored Matres burst upon the universe again, they take special care to lay waste to every extant Tleilaxu world, though the Honored Matres of later generations cannot remember the origin of their own hatred for the Tleilaxu. Murbella also discovers the true nature of the unknown Enemy: they are the resurrected thinking machines, thought destroyed 15,000 years before, at the end of the Butlerian Jihad, but amassing a force to finally exterminate humanity. Through Other Memory she witnesses the Honored Matres' first encounter with the unknown Enemy. A young Matre commander had invaded an area controlled by the remnants of the machine empire, with initial success. However, the thinking machines' retribution had been terrible, especially when they had realized that humans still existed. The machines had destroyed the Honored Matre empire, and the remnants had then fled back to the Old Empire to build a new dominion.

== Ixians ==
The Ixians are a technological culture in Frank Herbert's science fiction Dune universe. They provide both simple and sophisticated mechanical devices to the rest of the Imperium. Though Ixian technology is commonplace and considered essential, it sometimes tests the limits of the anti-technology proscriptions established in the aftermath of the Butlerian Jihad, humanity's crusade against computers, thinking machines, and conscious robots. Among the Ixians' inventions later in the series are the no-chamber, a construct that hides anything inside from prescient vision and long-range instruments, and the no-ship, a no-chamber in starship form that does not require a Guild Navigator to fold space.

By the time of the events described in the 1965 novel Dune, Ix is the leader in providing technology to the Imperium. Ixian devices are ever-present, but the society itself is unseen until later in the series. The sequel to Dune, Dune Messiah (1969), refers to the "Ixian Confederacy". In God Emperor of Dune (1981), Leto II Atreides's precognition shows him that his Golden Path has prevented a future in which the Ixians released, and ultimately lost control of, self improving hunter-seekers that would eventually consume all organic life in the known universe. Leto talks about his relationship with the former Ixian ambassador Malky, who had been specially raised and trained by the Ixians to be a "tempter", the "Devil to Leto's God." The Ixians had intended for Malky to manipulate Leto into doubting his own purpose; the plan had ultimately failed. They had later created Hwi Noree, a female designed specifically to attract, seduce, and hold influence over Leto. In the novel, Leto meets Hwi and sees this intent, but cannot dismiss his attraction to her. The Ixian embassy on Arrakis is infiltrated by Tleilaxu Face Dancers, who kill and replace everyone there—except for Hwi—as part of an assassination attempt on Leto. The attempt fails, but Leto later allows himself and Hwi to be killed by Siona Atreides as part of his own plan for the universe.

The Ixians had kept Hwi's development a secret through the use of their new invention, the no-room (later called a no-chamber), a construct which is able to hide the people within from prescience, as Guild Navigators can. The Ixians had also created the Navigation Device which would eventually take the place of Guild Navigators and help fuel the diaspora known as the Scattering. Combining these two technologies later results in the no-ship, a starship that can remain unseen and does not require a Navigator to fold space. By the time of the events described in Heretics of Dune (1984), the power of the Ixians seems at its apex with their alliance with the Fish Speakers; however, Bene Gesserit analysts see them as a failing power, because Ixian society had become a bureaucracy and no great inventions had come out of the workshops of Ix for centuries. As the Honored Matres conquer the Old Empire, the Ixians are reduced to a barely tolerated technological combine. In Chapterhouse: Dune (1985), the latest Duncan Idaho ghola suggests that Leto had never "suppressed" Ix because "he was fascinated by the idea of human and machine inextricably bound to each other, each testing the limits of the other."

=== Prequels ===
In the Prelude to Dune (1999–2001) prequel trilogy, Ix is a beautiful, untouched planet that remains so by having no development on the surface. The industry of Ix is subterranean, mainly consisting of labs and factories. The Ixians are the galaxy leader in technological production and have the monopoly on producing the starships known as heighliners. House Vernius rules the planet, but the Padishah Emperor Elrood IX Corrino holds a grudge against Earl Dominic Vernius for two reasons: Dominic had married Elrood's former concubine, Shando Balut, and Ix's new, larger heighliners negatively impact Imperial tax revenue on cargo. Elrood secretly grants the Tleilaxu the right to occupy Ix by force (with the help of his Sardaukar army) and remake it into a laboratory station for Project Amal. This secret project seeks to produce a synthetic version of melange which the Tleilaxu Master Ajidica calls ajidamal, or amal. The Emperor wants to take over the spice monopoly by making sure that he has the only access to spice, thus controlling the Spacing Guild. The Tleilaxu seize control of Ix and rename it "Xuttuh" after their founder, and House Vernius is forced to go rogue. Although Ajidica manages to create an artificial melange that seems to have the original's properties, it is proven to have adverse effects when two Guild Navigators, unknowingly testing the substance, cause the destruction of their heighliners. When Duke Leto Atreides invades Xuttuh and reestablishes Rhombur Vernius as the ruler of Ix, all the records of Project Amal are destroyed.

== Landsraad ==
The Landsraad is a political body in Frank Herbert's science fiction Dune universe. As established in Herbert's 1965 novel Dune, it is the assembly of all noble Houses in the Imperium, and plays a very important role in the political and economic power balance of the Empire, which is shared among the Landsraad, the Padishah Emperor, and the Spacing Guild (the Bene Gesserit prefer clandestine manipulation to overt action and therefore remain a "silent" fourth power in the Empire until the fall of Leto II Atreides). The Emperor's power derives from Imperial control of the seemingly invincible military forces of the Sardaukar, and of the planet Arrakis and its priceless melange, a source of endless wealth. The Landsraad represents the unification of all the other ruling families, known as Houses, to create a check against the individual power of the Emperor, a theoretically comparable force. Both the combined Houses and the Emperor are in turn dependent on the Guild for interstellar travel. This delicate balance of power initially serves to prevent any particularly ambitious or destructive faction or individual from upsetting the stability of society.

In "Terminology of the Imperium," the glossary of Dune (1965), Herbert specifies a House as a "Ruling Clan of a planet or planetary system," with major Houses holding planetary fiefs and being interplanetary entrepreneurs, and minor Houses being planet-bound. Individual Houses are in constant competition for fiefdoms, financial and political power, and Imperial favor. The High Council is the inner circle of the Landsraad during the time of the Faufreluches, "the rigid rule of class distinction enforced by the Imperium." The council is "empowered to act as supreme tribunal in House to House disputes." A grievance is brought before the High Council in a Bill of Particulars. Shortly after the assassination of his father Duke Leto Atreides and the Harkonnen/Corrino invasion of the planet Arrakis in Dune, Paul Atreides expresses a desire to put forward a Bill of Particulars to the Landsraad High Council to express his grievance and point out the laws that had been broken by this invasion. Paul believes that his grievance would be supported because the Great Houses would never endorse the Sardaukar eliminating them one by one (which is, of course, one of the principal reasons why the Landsraad exists to begin with). The Judge of the Change is "an official appointed by the Landsraad High Council and the Emperor to monitor a change of fief, a kanly negotiation, or a formal battle in a War of Assassins. The Judge's arbitral authority may be challenged only before the High Council with the Emperor present." As a political body, the Landsraad predates the end of the Butlerian Jihad (itself 10,000 years before the events of the novel) by approximately 2000 years. It was at some point referred to as the Landsraad League, and held influence over more than 13,300 worlds immediately after the Jihad.

The word Landsraad is a compound word meaning "council of the land" (the 's' indicates possessive case). The word exists in several Germanic languages. It was still written as landsraad in Danish until the spelling reform of 1948 saw it changed to landsråd. Herbert borrowed the word from a Scandinavian language. When asked, he defined the Landsraad thus:

Q: In the novel Dune, what is the Landsraad?

Herbert: Well, Landsraad is an old Scandinavian word for an assembly of landowners. It's historically accurate in that it was an assembly and the first meetings of the legislative body—an early one, yes. The Landsraad—it's the landed gentry.

=== Prequels ===
It is established in the Legends of Dune prequel trilogy (2002–2004) by Brian Herbert and Kevin J. Anderson that the predecessor to the Landsraad is the League of Nobles. The League is the system of government employed by the remaining free humans before and during the Butlerian Jihad; it is feudal at its core but slightly more democratic than the Landsraad, as the League members vote for which Viceroy they prefer to govern them. After the Jihad and the accession of Faykan Corrino to the new Imperial throne, the Landsraad is formed by the League in order to keep the power of the Corrinos in check.

== Mentats ==
A Mentat is a type of human, presented in Frank Herbert's science fiction Dune universe. In an interstellar society that fears a resurgence of artificial intelligence and thus prohibits computers, Mentats are specially trained to mimic the cognitive and analytical ability of computers. In Herbert's Dune universe, a historical movement known as the Butlerian Jihad results in the strict prohibition of all "thinking machines", including computers, robots and artificial intelligence of any kind. This is a key influence on the setting of Herbert's Dune series. More than simply calculators, Mentats possess exceptional cognitive abilities of memory and perception that enable them to sift large volumes of data and devise concise analyses. They can accurately assess people and situations by interpreting minor changes in body language or intonation. Early training occurs without the subject's knowledge, and at a certain age they are made aware, and given the choice to continue. Though human nature brings an ethical component to a Mentat's logic and reasoning, the Tleilaxu can create "twisted Mentats", who are sociopaths free from the usual constraints of human morality and ethical boundaries. Mentat capabilities can be greatly increased by taking sapho juice, an addictive drug extracted from roots found on Ecaz. Repeated use leaves a permanent "cranberry-colored stain" on the user's lips.

In Dune (1965), House Atreides Mentat Thufir Hawat is considered to be one of the finest Mentats of his time, and his protégé, Paul Atreides, is trained as a Mentat. Twisted Mentat Piter De Vries serves as advisor and strategist to the Baron Vladimir Harkonnen in Dune. In Dune Messiah (1969), the Tleilaxu restore renowned Atreides swordsman Duncan Idaho to life as a ghola, Hayt, imbued with the powers of both a Mentat and Zensunni philosopher. In Heretics of Dune (1984) and Chapterhouse: Dune (1985), Miles Teg has an illustrious career as a combined Mentat and high-ranking leader of the Bene Gesserit military forces. In God Emperor of Dune (1981), Leto II outlaws the Mentat order and crushes any renegade training schools he finds. The Bene Gesserit preserve the Mentat discipline, assuming that Leto knows of this through his prescience, and approves. Later, in Chapterhouse Dune, the Bene Gesserit Reverend Mother Bellonda learns from Other Memory that the Order of Mentats was founded by Gilbertus Albans.

=== Prequels ===
The origin of the first Mentat is later explored in the Legends of Dune (2002–2004) prequels written by Kevin J. Anderson and Brian Herbert. During the Butlerian Jihad, thinking machine leader Omnius sees humans as animals, but the independent robot Erasmus argues that any human can become brilliant. Omnius picks a nine-year-old, blond-haired boy who appears to be the wildest and most unkempt of all, and challenges Erasmus to prove his theory. Erasmus calls the boy Gilbertus Albans, thinking that this sounds like a smart human's name. After initially failing to make progress by using a system of benevolence and rewards, he switches to a system of strict supervision and punishment, and the method works. By emulating Erasmus, whom he has come to consider his father, Albans becomes the first human to display computer-like cognitive and calculation capacity on the level of thinking machines. Because of Gilbertus' remarkable memory, organizational ability and capacity for logical thinking, Erasmus nicknames him "Mentat", created from the words "mentor", "mentee", and "mentation".

== Padishah Emperors ==
The Padishah Emperors are the hereditary rulers of the Old Empire in Frank Herbert's science fiction Dune universe. In Herbert's originating novel Dune (1965), it is established that while the Padishah Emperor is supreme sovereign ruler of the known universe, power is shared, in a quasi-feudal arrangement, with the noble houses of the Landsraad and with the Spacing Guild, which possesses a monopoly over interstellar travel. Members of House Corrino sit on the Golden Lion throne as Padishah Emperors from the time of the ancient Battle of Corrin until the events of Dune some 10,000 years later. Dune establishes that Salusa Secundus had been the homeworld of House Corrino, and at some point the Imperial Court had moved to the planet Kaitain.

As Dune begins, the 81st Padishah Emperor is Shaddam IV, but by the end of the novel he is deposed by Duke Paul Atreides in 10,193 A.G. (After Guild) after Paul seizes control of the desert planet Arrakis, the only source of the all-important spice melange. Though Paul subsequently rules as Emperor, the term "Padishah" is dropped, and the Imperium as it has previously been known essentially ceases to exist since absolute control of the spice gives Paul unprecedented power over the Landsraad, Spacing Guild and all other factions. As detailed in Dune Messiah (1969), Paul's apparent death 13 years later puts his sister Alia in place as Imperial Regent for his children, Leto II and Ghanima. Young Leto ascends the throne in 1976's Children of Dune, becoming a human-sandworm hybrid to achieve superhuman physical abilities and longevity. Leto rules as God Emperor for over 3,500 years; his assassination in God Emperor of Dune (1981) effectively abolishes the Imperial throne.

=== Prequels ===
Several prequel novels by Brian Herbert and Kevin J. Anderson further explore the back-story of the Dune universe. According to their Legends of Dune prequel trilogy (2002–2004), the Empire had been founded on Salusa Secundus. Following the human victory over the thinking machines in the Battle of Corrin, Viceroy Faykan Butler takes the last name Corrino in commemoration. He ultimately names himself the first Padishah Emperor, Faykan I. The Prelude to Dune prequel trilogy (1999–2001) chronicles the last years of the reign of Shaddam's father, Elrood IX, as well as Shaddam's accession and reign until the events of Dune. The series also reveals that, after centuries as the capital of the Corrino Padishah Empire, Salusa had been devastated by atomics. The Imperial throne had been relocated to the planet Kaitain, where it remains for millennia.

== Rakian Priesthood ==
The Rakian Priesthood is a priestly body that worships the Divided God, Leto II Atreides. They rule Rakis during the time the Lost Ones are returning from the Scattering, approximately 1500 years after Leto II's death. They are presumably descendants of the Fish Speakers priestesses. The Rakian Priesthood maintain that both Muad'Dib and his son Leto II were hallowed, and that Leto was God Himself. Their canon details how, after his death, Leto divided into the sandworms and became Shai-Hulud, hence the term "Divided God". The Priesthood is largely populated with individuals who lack insight, but possess ambition. After Leto's death, they maintain a brutal rule over Rakis, marked by random executions. Other powers from the Old Imperium, including the Bene Gesserit, the Fish Speakers, and the Bene Tleilax, have come to find them a troublesome, ignorant group. The Bene Gesserit, however, enjoy a particularly great influence over the priesthood.

At the time of the discovery of Sheeana, the Priesthood is led by the High Priest Hedley Tuek, a descendant of Esmar Tuek. Tuek is eventually killed by the Tleilaxu and replaced with a Face Dancer, with the approval of the Bene Gesserit. However, the Face Dancer eventually comes to believe that he is Tuek. The entire Rakian Priesthood is later annihilated, along with the planet's population, when the surface of Rakis is sterilized by the Honored Matres.

== Sardaukar ==
The Sardaukar are a military force from Frank Herbert's Dune universe, primarily appearing in the 1965 science fiction novel Dune, as well as Brian Herbert and Kevin J. Anderson's Prelude to Dune prequel trilogy (1999–2001). They are soldier-fanatics loyal to the Padishah Emperors of House Corrino, who have ruled the known universe for over 10,000 years at the time of the events of Dune. The key to House Corrino's hold on the Imperial throne, the Sardaukar troops are the most formidable professional military in the universe in that time. They are secretly trained on the inhospitable Imperial prison planet Salusa Secundus, and the harsh conditions there ensure that only the strongest and most ferocious men survive. Sardaukar training emphasizes ruthlessness, near-suicidal disregard for personal safety, and the use of cruelty as a standard weapon in order to weaken opponents with terror. Their uniforms are described as gray with silver and gold trim.

As Dune begins, the 81st Padishah Emperor Shaddam IV sends Sardaukar to join the forces of the Baron Harkonnen in their attack on the stronghold of Duke Leto Atreides on the desert planet Arrakis. The Atreides forces are crushed and the Duke killed, but Leto's concubine, Lady Jessica, and son, Paul, escape and find refuge with the native Fremen of Arrakis, a fierce people with secretly large numbers and formidable fighting skills. Paul's training in Bene Gesserit martial arts and galvanization of their rebellion under his command make the newly allied Fremen forces unstoppable, superior even to the Emperor's Sardaukar. Using the Bene Gesserit compulsion technique called the Voice, Paul himself manages to compel the Sardaukar Captain Aramsham to humiliate himself by surrendering. However, Aramsham's Sardaukar discipline is so strong that he will not even give his name until Paul uses the Voice again. The defeat of the Sardaukar and Paul's stranglehold on the supply of the all-important spice melange allows him to depose Shaddam, marry his eldest daughter Princess Irulan, and ascend the throne.

In Dune Messiah (1969), Shaddam retains a single legion of Sardaukar in his exile on Salusa Secundus. Paul's concubine Chani later recognizes Sardaukar spies hidden among a visiting Spacing Guild entourage, and they are killed. It is also revealed that a "wise Sardaukar commander" had retrieved the corpse of the slain Atreides Swordmaster Duncan Idaho, which had been entrusted to the Tleilaxu and used to create a ghola duplicate. During the events of Children of Dune (1976), Princess Wensicia, younger daughter of Shaddam IV, initiates a plot for her family and the Sardaukar to return to power. By this time, Paul has improved conditions on Salusa under the guise of making the planet more hospitable for the exiled Corrinos, but with the intent of rendering it an ineffective training ground for more soldiers. Though Wensicia's son Farad'n has tried to maintain the strict discipline that keeps the Sardaukar at their best, when Wensicia's efforts fail Farad'n voluntarily surrenders the army to the new Emperor, Paul's son Leto II Atreides. The text of God Emperor of Dune notes that, during the 3,500-year reign of Leto II after the events of Children of Dune, one of Leto II's many Duncan Idaho gholas had led the remnants of the Sardaukar in an unsuccessful revolt. Leto II finally abolishes the Sardaukar corps, replacing them with the all-female Fish Speakers. Leto believes that male-dominated military organizations are essentially predatory and will turn on the civilian population in the absence of an external enemy.

A line of Dune action figures released by toy company LJN in 1984, styled after David Lynch's film, included a figure of a Sardaukar warrior.

== Spacing Guild ==
The Spacing Guild is an organization in the Dune universe whose monopoly on interstellar travel and banking makes it a balance of power against the Padishah Emperor and the assembled noble Houses of the Landsraad. Mutated Guild Navigators use the spice drug melange to successfully navigate "folded space" and safely guide enormous heighliner starships from planet to planet instantaneously. Essentially apolitical, the Guild is primarily concerned with the flow of commerce and preservation of the economy that supports them; though their ability to dictate the terms of and fees for all transport gives them influence in the political arena, they do not pursue political goals beyond their economic ones.

== Suk School ==
The Suk School is a prominent medical school in Frank Herbert's science fiction Dune universe. Suk doctors are the universe's most competent and trusted physicians. Those who have received the "Suk Imperial Conditioning" are incapable of inflicting harm upon their charges. These individuals bear a black diamond tattoo on their foreheads, and wear their hair long and bound in a special silver ring.

The fallibility of Suk training is proven in Dune (1965), in a situation involving Dr. Wellington Yueh. The Harkonnen twisted Mentat Piter De Vries notes:

Hawat will have divined that we have an agent planted on him ... The obvious suspect is Dr. Yueh, who is indeed our agent. But Hawat has investigated and found that our doctor is a Suk School graduate with Imperial Conditioning — supposedly safe enough to minister even to the Emperor. Great store is set on Imperial Conditioning. It's assumed that ultimate conditioning cannot be removed without killing the subject. However, as someone once observed, given the right lever you can move a planet. We found the lever that moved the doctor.

To gain such leverage against Yueh, Baron Vladimir Harkonnen had abducted and tortured Yueh's wife Wanna. The doctor is thus compelled to betray House Atreides in exchange for her release. Even so, Yueh allows Paul Atreides and Lady Jessica to escape the attack and gives Duke Leto Atreides the means to kill the Baron (though Leto fails to do so).

Later in the series, in Heretics of Dune (1984) and Chapterhouse: Dune (1985), many Bene Gesserits are trained by Suk Schools to become doctors for the Sisterhood.

=== Prequels ===
The origins of the school are explored in the Legends of Dune prequel trilogy (2002–2004) by Brian Herbert and Kevin J. Anderson. It gets its name from Dr. Mohandas Suk, a physician instrumental in fighting a catastrophic thinking machine-created plague among humans during the Butlerian Jihad. After the war he sets out to establish a medical institution which will assure "that no threat of machine, war, or plague can ever harm us again."

== Swordmasters of Ginaz ==
The Swordmasters of Ginaz are a school of martial artists in Frank Herbert's science fiction Dune universe. They are mentioned briefly in 1965's Dune and its 1969 sequel Dune Messiah. "Terminology of the Imperium" in the Appendix of Dune notes that House Ginaz are "one-time allies of Duke Leto Atreides" and are "defeated in the War of Assassins with Grumman." Duncan Idaho is noted to be a "Swordmaster of the Ginaz," which leads to his body later being sold to the Tleilaxu as "a master swordsman, an adept of the Ginaz School."

=== Prequels ===
The school's origins are detailed in the Legends of Dune prequel trilogy (2002–2004) by Brian Herbert and Kevin J. Anderson. Jool Noret of the ocean-covered planet Ginaz uses personal tragedy to make himself a fierce and innovative warrior, distinguishing himself in the ongoing war against the machine forces of Omnius in the Butlerian Jihad. Despite his reluctance to bask in fame or accept students, young warriors flock to Ginaz for training; he concedes, and eventually his unique fighting style becomes an art in its own right. Ultimately, the mercenaries of Ginaz are considered the most elite warriors available outside the Imperial Sardaukar.

== Thinking machines ==
Thinking machines (a cymek (left) and Erasmus) from the cover of Dune: The Machine Crusade (2003)

Thinking machines is a collective term for artificial intelligence in Frank Herbert's science fiction Dune universe. The Butlerian Jihad — a human crusade against thinking machines — is an epic turning point in the backstory of the Dune universe. The thinking machines are first mentioned in 1965's Dune, the glossary of which includes the following:

JIHAD, BUTLERIAN: (see also Great Revolt) — the crusade against computers, thinking machines, and conscious robots begun in 201 B.G. and concluded in 108 B.G. Its chief commandment remains in the O.C. Bible as "Thou shalt not make a machine in the likeness of a human mind."

In Dune Messiah (1969), the Tleilaxu Face Dancer Scytale notes that "From the days of the Butlerian Jihad when 'thinking machines' had been wiped from most of the universe, computers had inspired distrust." Herbert refers to thinking machines and the Jihad several times in his later works in the Dune series, but does not give much detail on how he imagined either. In God Emperor of Dune (1981), Leto II Atreides indicates that the Jihad had been a semi-religious social upheaval initiated by humans who felt repulsed by how guided and controlled they had become by machines:

"The target of the Jihad was a machine-attitude as much as the machines," Leto said. "Humans had set those machines to usurp our sense of beauty, our necessary selfdom out of which we make living judgments. Naturally, the machines were destroyed."

Later in the same novel, Leto tests Siona Atreides, who experiences a vision of the future Leto is trying to prevent with his Golden Path — mankind's extinction at the hands of "seeking machines":

He knew this experience, but could not change the smallest part of it. No ancestral presences would remain in her consciousness, but she would carry with her forever afterward the clear sights and sounds and smells. The seeking machines would be there, the smell of blood and entrails, the cowering humans in their burrows aware only that they could not escape . . . while all the time the mechanical movement approached, nearer and nearer and nearer ...louder...louder! Everywhere she searched, it would be the same. No escape anywhere.

Herbert's death in 1986 left this topic unexplored and open to speculation.

=== Prequels ===
Chronicling the Butlerian Jihad, the Legends of Dune prequel trilogy (2002–2004) by Brian Herbert and Kevin J. Anderson establishes that the thinking machines are a host of destructive robots led by Omnius, a sentient computer network. A thousand years before the Jihad, a group of twenty dissident humans had used thinking machines to enslave the rest of mankind, and then converted themselves into weaponized human-machine hybrids called cymeks. Essentially immortal and unstoppable, they had become known as the Titans, but after a century had been overthrown themselves by Omnius and made his servants. Much of mankind suffers under thinking machine oppression for another 900 years, before the murder of young Manion Butler at the hands of the independent robot Erasmus incites the Butlerian Jihad. The last remaining free humans fight for a century before finally defeating the machines in the Battle of Corrin.

=== Sequels ===
In Hunters of Dune (2006), Brian Herbert and Kevin J. Anderson's first of a two-part finale to Frank Herbert's original series, the antagonists Daniel and Marty (introduced in Frank Herbert's 1985 Chapterhouse: Dune) are revealed to be incarnations of Omnius and Erasmus. In the third Legends novel Dune: The Battle of Corrin (2004), Omnius had sent out a last burst of information before being destroyed in the Battle of Corrin; it is explained in Hunters that this signal had eventually connected with one of the probes disseminated from Giedi Prime several decades earlier, uploading versions of Erasmus and Omnius.

== Titans ==
The Titans are a group of warlike cyborgs in the Legends of Dune (2002–2004) trilogy of prequel novels, written by Brian Herbert and Kevin J. Anderson and set in Frank Herbert's science fiction Dune universe.

Over 11,000 years before the events of Frank Herbert's Dune (1965), a group of 20 ambitious humans see the stagnation of the Old Empire and realize that their small band can take control of it with the aid of thinking machines. Calling themselves the Titans, they rule humanity for a hundred years and rename themselves after famous historical and mythological figures, most notably Agamemnon, Ajax, Barbarossa, Dante, Hecate, Juno, Tlaloc and Xerxes. Eventually the group separates to each rule their own worlds in the galaxy, utilizing the thinking machines that had originally brought them to power as the means to control entire planets. Realizing that their human bodies are fragile and their lifespans limited, the Titans find a way to extend their lives indefinitely: installing their brains with the help of specialized interfaces into large, walking machine bodies. Calling themselves cymeks, the Titans become virtually unstoppable in these new fearsome, weaponized bodies. Having pushed to the very farthest limits of artificial intelligence, their own machines run their empire for them for a century. Then, having mistakenly given one attendant AI program too much autonomy, the Titans suddenly find themselves overthrown and enslaved by an AI consciousness calling itself Omnius that seizes control of the entire known universe through the interconnected machine network. For over 900 years the Titans live in perpetual servitude to Omnius, cruelly subjugating humanity, quelling human insurrections and secretly plotting their own return to power. The murder of young Manion Butler at the hands of the independent robot Erasmus finally incites the Butlerian Jihad; the last remaining free humans fight for a century before finally destroying both Omnius' forces and the remaining Titans in the Battle of Corrin.
