= Melange (Dune) =

Fictional drug central to the Dune series by Frank Herbert

- Dune franchise element
- Container of melange being examined by a poison snooper in David Lynch's Dune (1984)
- First appearance: Dune; 1965
- Created by: Frank Herbert
- Genre: Science fiction

In-universe information
- Type: Drug
- Function: Ingested to lengthen lifespan, improve health, and heighten awareness
- Traits and abilities: Heavy powder which smells like cinnamon and glows blue; highly addictive, and longterm users acquire blue-within-blue colored eyes
- Affiliation: Bene Gesserit; CHOAM; Fremen; Sandworms

Melange (/meɪˈlɑːnʒ/), often referred to as "the spice", is the fictional psychedelic drug central to the Dune series of science fiction novels by Frank Herbert and derivative works.

In the series, the most essential and valuable commodity in the universe is melange, a drug that gives the user a longer life span, greater vitality, and heightened awareness. In some humans, the spice can also unlock prescience, a form of precognition based in genetics but made possible by use of the drug in larger dosages. By far the most important of prescience’s functions is that it makes safe and accurate interstellar travel possible. However, melange is also highly addictive, and withdrawal is fatal. Harvesting melange is also hazardous in the extreme, as its only known source is the harsh desert planet Arrakis, where its deposits are guarded by giant sandworms.

== Description ==
=== Properties ===
Melange is a drug that prolongs life and bestows heightened vitality and awareness, and in some humans unlocks prescience, a form of precognition based in genetics but made possible by use of the spice. In the story, the Spacing Guild uses humans mutated by excessive consumption of melange, and thereby endowed with limited prescience, to safely navigate heighliner starships through folded space. In larger quantities, the spice possesses intense psychotropic effects and is used as a powerful entheogen by both the Bene Gesserit and the Fremen people of Arrakis to initiate clairvoyant and precognitive trances, access genetic memory, and heighten other abilities. The Fremen also use the spice to make, among other things, paper, plastics, and chemical explosives, and the existence of "spice-cloth" and "spice-fiber" rugs are noted in Dune Messiah (1969) and Children of Dune (1976). Melange can be mixed with food, and it is used to make beverages such as spice coffee, spice beer, and spice liquor.

By the events of Dune, the spice is used throughout the universe and is a sign of wealth. Duke Leto Atreides notes that of every valuable commodity known to mankind, "all fades before melange. A handful of spice will buy a home on Tupile." Jon Michaud of The New Yorker wrote: "Imagine a substance with the combined worldwide value of cocaine and petroleum and you will have some idea of the power of melange." Due to the rarity and value of melange and its necessity as a catalyst for interstellar travel, the Padishah Emperor's power at the outset of Dune is secured by his control of Arrakis, which puts him on equal footing with both the assembly of noble families called the Landsraad and the Spacing Guild, which monopolizes interstellar travel. Seizing control of the planet, Paul Atreides intensifies this form of hydraulic despotism by asserting control over both the Landsraad and Spacing Guild, as well as other factions in the universe. Paul's sister Alia says in Children of Dune, "The spice often called 'the secret coinage'. Without melange, the Spacing Guild's heighliners could not move ... Without melange and its amplification of the human immunogenic system, life expectancy for the very rich degenerated by a factor of at least four. Even the vast middle class of the Imperium ate diluted melange in small sprinklings with at least one meal a day."

=== Physiological side effects ===
Extensive use of the drug tints the sclera, cornea, and iris of the user to a dark shade of blue, called "blue-in-blue" or "the Eyes of Ibad", which is something of a source of pride among the Fremen and a symbol of their tribal bond. In Dune, Paul initially has green eyes, but after several years on Arrakis they begin to take on the deep, uniform blue of the Fremen. On other planets, the addicted often use tinted contact lenses to hide this discoloration. In Dune, Padishah Emperor Shaddam IV notes of two Guildsmen:

The taller of the two, though, held a hand to his left eye. As the Emperor watched, someone jostled the Guildsman's arm, the hand moved, and the eye was revealed. The man had lost one of his masking contact lenses, and the eye stared out a total blue so dark as to be almost black.

Melange is also highly addictive, and withdrawal means certain death. Paul Atreides notes in Dune that the spice is "[a] poison—so subtle, so insidious... so irreversible. It won't even kill you unless you stop taking it." When aerosolized and used as an inhalant in extremely high dosages—the standard practice for Guild Navigators—the drug alters the physiology of its user. In the first chapter of Dune Messiah, Guild Navigator Edric is described in his tank of spice gas as "an elongated figure, vaguely humanoid with finned feet and hugely fanned membranous hands—a fish in a strange sea."

In Children of Dune, the term "spice trance" is used to describe the effects of an overdose of spice. Alia had previously subjected herself to such an overdose late in Dune Messiah, hoping to enhance her prescient visions. She achieves some success, but in Children of Dune, Leto II and Ghanima blame the trance for Alia's descent into Abomination. Fearful of the same fate, they resist Alia's urgings to undergo the spice trance themselves. The trial is later forced upon Leto at Jacurutu when it is suspected that he too is an Abomination. Leto survives the challenge and escapes, but is left changed. Unlike Alia, however, he remains in control, and the spice trance opens his eyes to the Golden Path that will ultimately save humanity.

=== Appearance ===
Herbert is vague in describing the appearance of the spice. He hints at its color in Dune Messiah when he notes that Guild Navigator Edric "swam in a container of orange gas ... His tank's vents emitted a pale orange cloud rich with the smell of the geriatric spice, melange." Later in Heretics of Dune (1984), a discovered hoard of melange appears as "mounds of dark reddish brown". Herbert also indicates fluorescence in God Emperor of Dune (1981) when the character Moneo notes: "Great bins of melange lay all around in a gigantic room cut from native rock and illuminated by glowglobes ... The spice had glowed radiant blue in the dim silver light. And the smell—bitter cinnamon, unmistakable." Herbert writes repeatedly, starting in Dune (1965), that melange smells like cinnamon. In Dune, Lady Jessica notes that her first taste of spice "tasted like cinnamon". Dr. Yueh adds that the flavor is "never twice the same ... It's like life—it presents a different face each time you take it. Some hold that the spice produces a learned-flavor reaction. The body, learning a thing is good for it, interprets the flavor as pleasurable—slightly euphoric. And, like life, never to be truly synthesized."

=== Sources ===
In Dune, there is only one source of melange: the sands of the planet Arrakis, colloquially known as Dune, and millennia later called simply "Rakis". Herbert notes in Dune that a pre-spice mass is "the stage of fungusoid wild growth achieved when water is flooded into the excretions of Little Makers", the "half-plant–half-animal deep-sand vector of the Arrakis sandworm". Gases are produced which result in "a characteristic 'blow', exchanging the material from deep underground for the matter on the surface above it." This blow is explosive in nature, erupting with enough force to kill anyone in the vicinity of it. Frank Herbert describes such a spice blow in the following passage from Dune:

Then he heard the sand rumbling. Every Fremen knew the sound, could distinguish it immediately from the noises of worms or other desert life. Somewhere beneath him, the pre-spice mass had accumulated enough water and organic matter from the little makers, had reached the critical stage of wild growth. A gigantic bubble of carbon dioxide was forming deep in the sand, heaving upward in an enormous "blow" with a dust whirlpool at its center. It would exchange what had been formed deep in the sand for whatever lay on the surface.

Herbert writes that the pre-spice mass, "after exposure to sun and air, becomes melange". He later indicates its color in Children of Dune, when Leto II passes "the leprous blotches of violet sand where a spiceblow had erupted".

Collecting the melange is hazardous in the extreme, since rhythmic activity on the desert surface of Arrakis attracts the worms, which can be up to 400 meters (1,300 feet) in length and are capable of swallowing a mining crawler whole. Thus, the mining operation essentially consists of vacuuming it from the surface with a vehicle called a harvester until a worm comes, at which time an aircraft known as a carryall lifts the mining vehicle to safety. The Fremen, who have learned to co-exist with the sandworms in the desert, harvest the spice manually for their own use and for smuggling off-planet.

Within the 1500 years between the events of God Emperor of Dune (1981) and Heretics of Dune (1984), the Tleilaxu discover an artificial method of producing the spice in their axlotl tanks, previously used only to create gholas. It is noted in Heretics of Dune that "[f]or every milligram of melange produced on Rakis, the Bene Tleilax tanks produced long tons". The technology "had broken the Rakian monopoly on the spice" but is not fully successful in pushing natural melange out of the marketplace.

== Prequels and sequels ==
=== Project Amal ===
In the Prelude to Dune prequel trilogy by Brian Herbert and Kevin J. Anderson (1999–2001), Project Amal is an early attempt by the Bene Tleilax to create synthetic melange in order to eliminate dependence upon Arrakis. Upon presenting their idea to the Padishah Emperor Elrood Corrino IX, in 10,154 A.G. the Tleilaxu are granted the right to occupy the planet Ix by force (with the help of Elrood's Sardaukar army) and remake it into a laboratory station for the project. The old Emperor wants to restructure the spice monopoly such that he has the only access to it, thus controlling the Spacing Guild. The Tleilaxu subsequently rename Ix "Xuttuh" after their founder. In the year 10,156 A.G., Elrood IX is assassinated by Count Hasimir Fenring at the behest of Crown Prince Shaddam. Shaddam, now under the name of Padishah Emperor Shaddam IV, gives Fenring the title of Imperial Spice Minister and orders him to supervise the project.

Although Tleilaxu Master Hidar Fen Ajidica manages to create an artificial melange (called "ajidamal", or "amal") that seems to have the original's properties, it does not work properly. Test-sandtrout explode when exposed to it, and Fenring's test of its use by Guild Navigators ends in catastrophe as one heighliner and its passengers are destroyed and the Navigator of a second heighliner dies. When Duke Leto Atreides invades Xuttuh in 10,175 A.G. and reestablishes Prince Rhombur of House Vernius as ruler of Ix, all the records of Project Amal are destroyed by Fenring. When the news hits the Landsraad, Shaddam denies all participation, claiming never to have heard of it. He maintains that it had probably been something his senile father Elrood had done in his last days. The Tleilaxu Masters involved are ultimately executed. Ajidica himself dies from the side effects of ajidamal: his body literally falls apart as the synthetic melange eats its way from the inside out.

=== Ultraspice ===
In Sandworms of Dune, Brian Herbert and Anderson's 2007 conclusion to the original series, the Spacing Guild is manipulated into replacing its Navigators with Ixian navigation devices and cutting off the Navigators' supply of melange. Sure to die should they be without the spice, a group of Navigators commission Waff, an imperfectly awakened Tleilaxu ghola, to create "advanced" sandworms able to produce the melange they so desperately require. He accomplishes this by altering the DNA of the worm's sandtrout stage and creating an aquatic form of the worms, which are then released into the oceans of Buzzell. Adapting to their new environment, these "seaworms" quickly flourish, eventually producing a highly concentrated form of spice, dubbed ultraspice. This new form of spice is so powerful that a relatively small dose causes a potential Kwisatz Haderach to descend into a complete and unbreakable coma through perfect prescience.

== Analysis ==
In Mycelium Running, mycologist Paul Stamets argues that Herbert's creation of melange was related in part to his own personal experiences with psilocybin mushrooms. Carol Hart analyzes the concept of the drug in the essay "Melange" in The Science of Dune (2008). Also in Science of Dune, Csilla Csori analyzes the concept of prescience in the essay "Prescience and Prophecy".

== See also ==
- Nootropics
- Synthetic cannabinoids, a real-life class of drugs sometimes called "spice"
- Psilocybin mushrooms
- Psilocybin
- Soma, fictional drug from the 1932 novel Brave New World by Aldous Huxley
