= Galach (Yiddish word) =

Yiddish word meaning priest

Galach (Yiddish: גלח) or gal'ach is a Yiddish word meaning priest or, sometimes, any type of Christian minister. Its etymology is the Hebrew word galach (Hebrew: גלח), meaning "to shave" or "shaven", which references the fact that rabbis traditionally wore beards. It may also be a reference to tonsure, traditionally practiced by both Catholic and Eastern Orthodox clerics.
