= Arrakis =

Fictional desert planet featured in the Dune series

- Dune universe location
- Grand Palace of Arrakeen and dunes of Arrakis from Frank Herbert's "The Road to Dune" (1985), illustrated by Jim Burns
- First appearance: Dune (1965)
- Created by: Frank Herbert
- Genre: Science fiction

In-universe information
- Other names: Dune, Rakis
- Type: Desert
- Ethnic group: Fremen
- Locations: Arrakeen, Sietch Tabr

Arrakis (/əˈrækɪs/, ə-RAK-iss), informally known as Dune and later called Rakis, is a fictional desert planet featured in the Dune series of novels by Frank Herbert. Herbert's first novel in the series, 1965's Dune, is considered one of the greatest science fiction novels of all time and is among the best-selling science fiction novels in history.

In Dune, Arrakis is the most important planet in the universe, as it is the only source of the drug melange. Melange (or "the spice") is the most essential and valuable commodity in the universe, as it extends life and makes safe interstellar travel possible (among other uses). Harvesting the spice is also hazardous in the extreme, due to both the harsh climate of the planet and the fact that melange deposits are guarded by giant sandworms.

Arrakis is also the home of the Fremen, a people conditioned by the planet's harsh environment. The planet eventually becomes the capital of the Atreides Empire.

== Environment and the spice ==
A desert planet with no natural precipitation, in Dune it is established that Arrakis had been "His Imperial Majesty's Desert Botanical Testing Station" before the discovery of melange, for which it is the only natural source in the universe. Melange (or "the spice") is the most essential and valuable commodity in the universe, as it extends life and makes safe interstellar travel possible (among other uses). The planet has no surface water bodies, but open canals called qanats are used "for carrying irrigation water under controlled conditions" through the desert. The Fremen collect water in underground reservoirs to fulfill their dream of someday terraforming the planet and pay the Spacing Guild exorbitant fees in melange to keep the skies over Arrakis free of any satellites which might observe their efforts. As indicated by its large salt flats, Arrakis once had lakes and oceans; Lady Jessica also notes in Dune that wells drilled in the sinks and basins initially produce a "trickle" of water which soon stops, as if "something plugs it".

Paul Atreides recalls that the few plants and animals on the planet include "saguaro, burro bush, date palm, sand verbena, evening primrose, barrel cactus, incense bush, smoke tree, creosote bush ... kit fox, desert hawk, kangaroo mouse ... many to be found now nowhere else in the universe except here on Arrakis". The most notable life forms on the planet are the giant sandworms and their immature forms of sandtrout and sand plankton. Sandtrout encyst any water deposits; predator fish are placed in the qanats and other water storage areas to protect them from the sandtrout. It is suggested that the sandworms are an introduced species that caused the desertification of Arrakis; In Children of Dune (1976), Leto II Atreides explains to his twin sister Ghanima:

The sandtrout [...] was introduced here from some other place. This was a wet planet then. They proliferated beyond the capability of existing ecosystems to deal with them. Sandtrout encysted the available free water, made this a desert planet [...] and they did it to survive. In a planet sufficiently dry, they could move to their sandworm phase.

The environment of the desert planet Arrakis was primarily inspired by the hydrocarbon (i.e. oil and/or natural gas) wealthy Mexico and the Middle East. Similarly Arrakis as a bioregion is presented as a particular kind of political site. Herbert has made it resemble a generic desertified petrostate.

== Inhabitants ==
The Zensunni wanderers, driven from planet to planet, eventually found their way to Arrakis, where they became the Fremen. They settled in artificial cave-like settlements known as sietches across the Arrakeen deserts. They also developed stillsuit technology, allowing them to survive in the open desert. By harvesting melange, they were able to bribe the Spacing Guild for privacy from observation and weather control in order to hide from the Imperium their true population and their plans to terraform Arrakis. Much of this ecological activity took place in the unexplored southern latitudes of the planet. The best-known of the sietches is Sietch Tabr, home of Stilgar and Muad'Dib's center of operations before victory in the Battle of Arrakeen put Muad'Dib on the Imperial throne.

According to the Legends of Dune prequel trilogy by Brian Herbert and Kevin J. Anderson, it was a group of Zensunni wanderers escaping slavery on the planet Poritrin who originally crashed on Dune in a prototype interstellar spacecraft several years prior to the creation of the Spacing Guild.

== Plotlines ==
During the events of Dune, the Padishah Emperor Shaddam IV grants Duke Leto Atreides control of the lucrative spice harvesting operations of Arrakis, ousting the Atreides' longtime rivals, the Harkonnens. The Atreides rule is cut short by a murderous conspiracy crafted by the Harkonnens and the Emperor himself. Leto's son Paul Atreides (known by the Fremen as Muad'Dib) later leads a massive Fremen army to victory over the Emperor's Sardaukar soldier-fanatics, and by threatening the destruction of all spice production on Arrakis manages to depose Shaddam and ascend the throne in his place. With Emperor Paul worshipped as a god, Arrakis becomes the governmental and religious center of the Imperium.

Paul Muad'Dib continues the efforts to terraform Arrakis into a green world, a plan begun by the Fremen under the guidance of Imperial Planetologist Pardot Kynes and his son Liet-Kynes. The core of their plan is gradual water-collection from the Arrakeen atmosphere to form large reservoirs that would, eventually, become lakes and oceans. Much of this activity takes place in the unexplored southern latitudes of Arrakis.

By the time of Children of Dune, Alia Atreides (and then Leto II and Ghanima) realize that the ecological transformation of Arrakis is altering the sandworm cycle, which would eventually result in the end of all spice production. This at first seems a future to be avoided, but Leto II later uses this eventuality as part of his Golden Path to ultimately save humanity. Once he himself begins the transformation into a human/sandworm hybrid, he eradicates all desert on Arrakis except for a small area he makes his base of operations, and destroys all of the sandworms save one—himself.

After his death some 3,500 years later in God Emperor of Dune, Leto's worm-body is transformed back into sandtrout. Within only a few centuries, these sandtrout return Arrakis (thence called 'Rakis') to a desert.

In Heretics of Dune, all life on Arrakis is destroyed (and the entire surface of the planet slagged into oblivion) by the Honored Matres in a failed attempt to eliminate the latest Duncan Idaho ghola. The Bene Gesserit escape with a single sandworm, and drown it to revert the worm back into sandtrout. In Chapterhouse: Dune, the Bene Gesserit use these sandtrout to begin a new sandworm cycle on their homeworld of Chapterhouse, which is terraformed into desert for this purpose.

Finally, in Sandworms of Dune, some sandworms are revealed to be alive and well on Arrakis, having sensed the upper crust would be destroyed and therefore burrowed even deeper, escaping the blast.

== Features ==
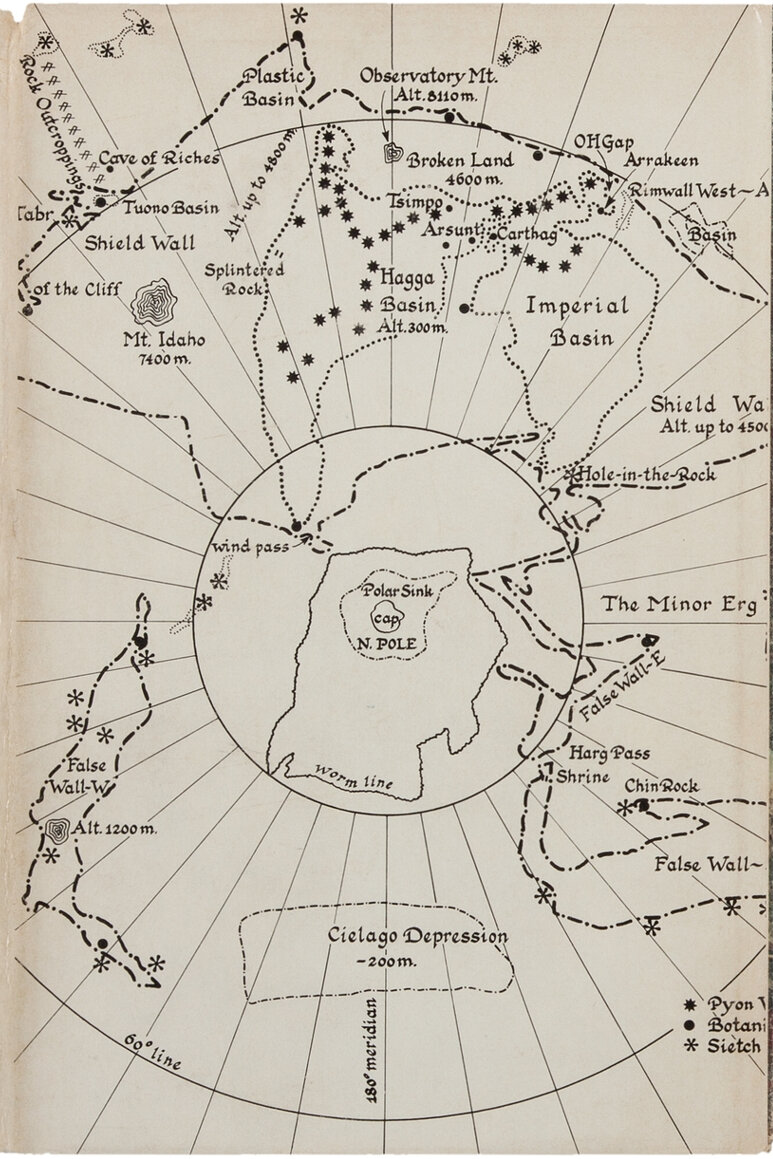
The map of Arrakis included on the dust jacket of the first edition of Dune

The technical name for Arrakis is Canopus 3 (in other words, the third planet orbiting said star). Arrakis itself is orbited by two moons. The first moon is larger, featuring a darker, weathered area of terrain vaguely resembling a human hand or clenched human fist and referred to colloquially as "the Hand of God". The second, smaller moon was named Muad'dib by the Zensunni, after an albedo pattern on it which resembles the desert kangaroo mouse. This creature is known for its ability to endure extreme temperatures and conserve moisture, characteristics that parallel Fremen survival strategies.

=== Arrakeen ===
The capital of Arrakis and its long-time seat of planetary government is Arrakeen (/ærəˈkiːn/). Leto I describes it as "a smaller city, easier to sterilize and defend". He and his family take up residence in the ostentatious palace previously occupied by the planetary governor Count Fenring and his wife Margot during the Harkonnen period of stewardship over Arrakis. In Dune, Leto's concubine Lady Jessica describes the Great Hall as being constructed of "bleak stone" with shadowed carvings, deeply recessed windows, buttressed walls and dark hangings. She notes: "The arched ceiling stood two stories above her with great [wooden] crossbeams she felt sure had been shipped here to Arrakis across space at monstrous cost." Arrakeen goes through multiple transformations over time. It first becomes an Imperial capital of staggering proportions under Paul Muad'Dib, and millennia later is transformed into a festival city known as Onn, explicitly for the worship of the Tyrant Leto II. Finally, in the centuries after his death, it is known as Keen, a modern (though still impressive) city to house the Priesthood of Rakis.

During the reign of Muad'Dib until the ascension of his son Leto II, the Atreides home-base is a colossal megastructure in Arrakeen, designed to intimidate, known as the Keep or the Grand Palace of Arrakeen. In Dune Messiah, the fortress is described as being large enough to enclose entire cities. Constructed during Paul's reign, is described as "the largest man-made structure ever built", big enough to contain "more than ten of the Imperium's most populous cities under one roof". Alia's Fane (or Alia's Temple) is a two-kilometer wide temple built by Paul for his sister Alia between the events of Dune and Dune Messiah. A feature of the temple is the Sun-Sweep Window, which incorporates every solar calendar known to human history.

=== Sietch Tabr ===
In Dune, Sietch Tabr is a major Fremen sietch originally led by Naib Stilgar ("Sietch Tabr" combines the Ukrainian Cossack words sich and tabor or "wagon fort"). Paul Atreides and his mother Lady Jessica, safely escaping from the Harkonnen attack, come upon Sietch Tabr and are eventually accepted into the community. In these Fremen Paul finds an incomparable fighting force who are already disgruntled by Imperial rule. He shapes them into a resistance movement that eventually takes control of Arrakis, allowing Paul to depose the Emperor. Paul moves his base of operations to Arrakeen, but Sietch Tabr remains a center of Fremen culture and politics, as well as a religiously significant site for those who worship Paul as a messiah. All Fremen sietches but one are abandoned after the terraforming of Arrakis, their exact locations remaining a mystery for thousands of years.

=== The Citadel of Leto II ===
The Tyrant Leto II rules the universe from the Citadel, a fortress built in the Last Desert of the Sareer. The Sareer is flanked by the Forbidden Forest, home of the ferocious D-wolves, the guardians of the Sareer. Beyond that lies the Idaho River, across which a bridge spans that leads to the festival city of Onn (once Arrakeen). Mount Idaho had been completely demolished to provide the raw materials to build the high walls surrounding the Sareer. The Citadel itself is taken apart in the Famine Times after the death of Leto II in search of his alleged hoard of spice.

=== Other locations ===
All Imperial cities on Arrakis are in the far-northern latitudes of the planet and protected from the violent weather of Arrakis by a natural formation known as the Shield Wall. When the Harkonnens controlled the planet, they ruled from the Harkonnen-built "megalopolis" of Carthag, described by Jessica as "a cheap and brassy place some two hundred kilometers northeast across the Broken Land". Arrakeen was merely the titular capital until the arrival of the Atreides.

There are other cities scattered in the northern regions of the planet (especially near the ice cap, where water is harvested), as well as the Fremen sietch communities scattered throughout the desert.

Other notable sites on Arrakis throughout its history include Observatory Mountain, Mount Idaho, Dar-es-balat and the Kynes Sea.

== Prequels ==
The novel Paul of Dune (2008) by Brian Herbert and Kevin J. Anderson establishes that the first known inhabitants of Arrakis had been the Muadru, who introduced the sandworms to the planet. They had settlements all over the galaxy which suddenly disappeared; the Zensunni Wanderers came later, ultimately becoming the Fremen. In the novel Paul notes: "There appears to be a linguistic connection between the Fremen and the Muadru."

== Namesakes ==
- On April 5, 2010, a real-world planitia (plain) on Saturn's moon Titan was named Arrakis Planitia after Herbert's fictional planet, under the naming convention for Titanian planitia (which are all named for planets in Frank Herbert's works).
- Arrakis is also an alternative name for the star Mu Draconis.
- The fictional desert planet of Tatooine in the Star Wars franchise was inspired by the desert planet of Arrakis in Dune. However, Tatooine is shown to be more hospitable than its conceptual precursor.
- Organisms named after Arrakis include the Australian trapdoor spider Synothele arrakis, so named because it has deep blue eyes, reminiscent of the eyes of longterm spice users; the fossil worm Arrakiscolex, in allusion to the sandworms of Arrakis; and a desert-dwelling cricket from Australia named simply Arrakis.

== Analysis ==
The significance of Arrakis has been discussed in the context of ecocriticism and ecofiction as well as in the context of influences of Arabic culture on modern popular culture.
