= Gurney Halleck =

Fictional character in the Dune franchise

- Dune character
- Patrick Stewart plays Halleck in the 1984 film.
- First appearance: Dune (1963–65)
- Last appearance: Dune: Part Two (2024)
- Created by: Frank Herbert
- Portrayed by: Patrick Stewart (1984 film); P. H. Moriarty (2000 miniseries / 2003 sequel); Josh Brolin (2021 / 2024 films / 2026 sequel)

In-universe information
- Occupation: Atreides Weapons Master
- Affiliation: House Atreides
- Significant other: Lady Jessica (Note: Gurney's later involvement with Lady Jessica is inferred in Children of Dune as Alia notes, "Gurney Halleck would be with [Jessica] ... Some said he'd become her mother's lover.")
- Relatives: Beth Halleck (sister) (Note: The Brian Herbert/Kevin J. Anderson prequels give Gurney's previously unnamed sister the name Beth.)

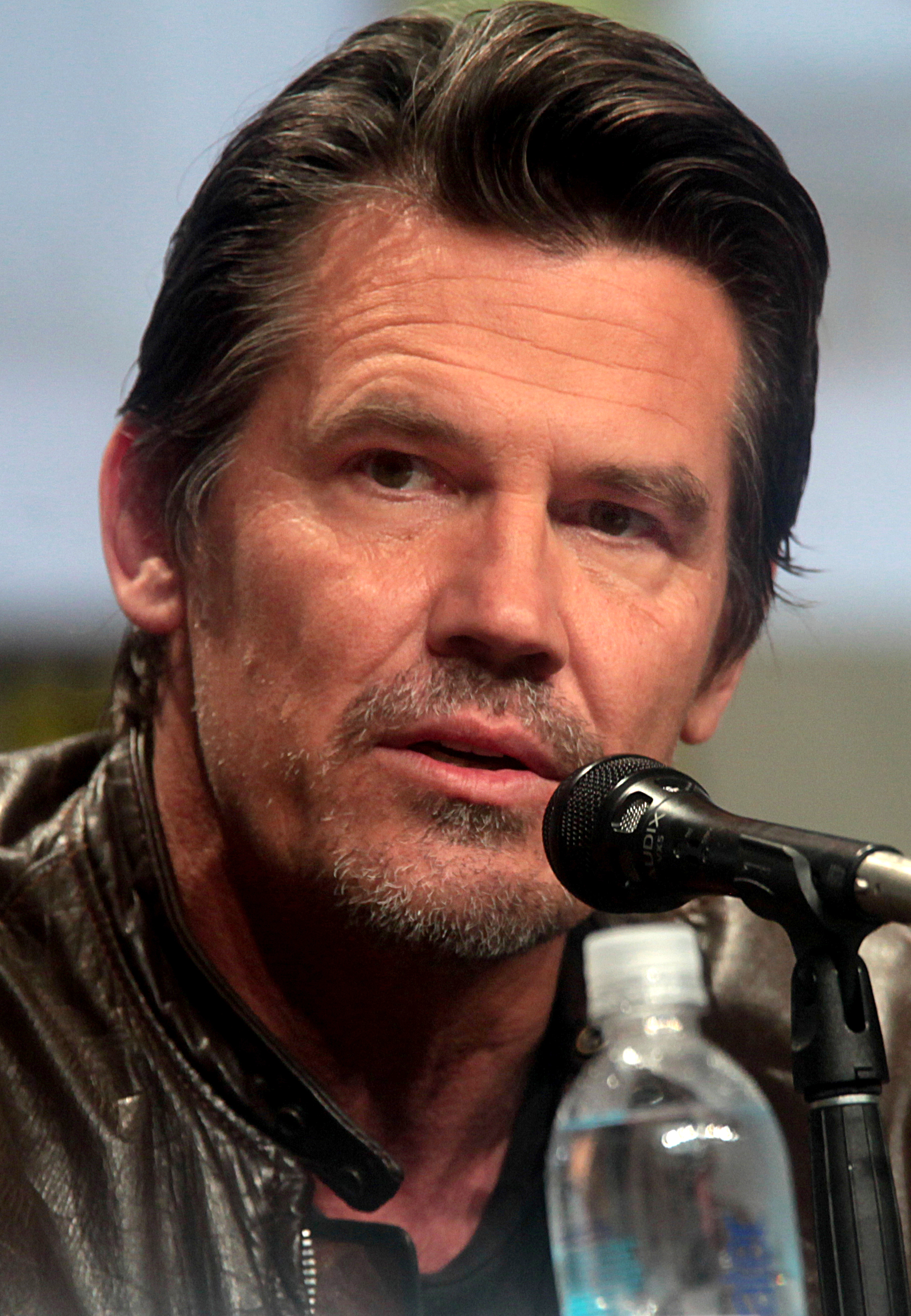
Josh Brolin plays Gurney in the 2021 film and its 2024 sequel.

Gurney Halleck is a fictional character in the Dune universe created by Frank Herbert. He is a major character in Herbert's Dune (1965) and Children of Dune (1976) as the War Master of House Atreides, acting as mentor, friend, and advisor to Paul Atreides. He also appears in some of the prequel/sequel novels by Brian Herbert and Kevin J. Anderson.

Gurney is portrayed by Patrick Stewart in the 1984 David Lynch film Dune. P. H. Moriarty plays the role in the 2000 Sci-Fi Channel TV miniseries Frank Herbert's Dune and its 2003 sequel, Frank Herbert's Children of Dune. The character is portrayed by Josh Brolin in the 2021 Denis Villeneuve film Dune, its 2024 sequel, Dune: Part Two, and the upcoming third film, Dune: Part Three.

== Characteristics ==
Halleck is a talented minstrel skilled in the use of the baliset, a stringed musical instrument. His jawline bears a scar from an inkvine whip wound inflicted by Glossu Rabban in the Harkonnen slave pits. A loyal friend to Duke Leto Atreides and his concubine Lady Jessica, many years after Leto's death it is suggested in Children of Dune that Gurney and Jessica have become lovers. Leto's son Paul Atreides refers to him as "Gurney the valorous" in Dune, and Duke Leto comments that Paul has named Gurney well.

== Appearances ==
=== Dune novels ===
Halleck is Paul's weapons teacher, as well as a skilled musician. He is one of Leto's chief officers, and serves alongside Duncan Idaho as the Weapons Master of House Atreides. According to Dune, Gurney was trained by "the best fighters in the universe", and alongside Idaho and Thufir Hawat gave Leto a war council almost unparalleled in the Imperium. He manages to survive the fall of House Atreides on Arrakis with 73 men. In the years after the attack, he falls in with the melange smugglers, eventually becoming a powerful figure. His smugglers fall for a Fremen trap—a fake hoard of spice—and are almost killed before Paul, now the Fremen leader "Muad'Dib", recognizes him. Halleck later becomes Jessica's loyal chief officer after nearly killing her, mistakenly believing she betrayed Duke Leto.

In Children of Dune, Gurney returns to Arrakis with Jessica from Caladan. He coordinates a purging of dissidents along with Fremen leader Stilgar, an operation that he kept secret. He goes to the sietch Jacurutu under what he believes are Jessica's orders to test that Paul's son Leto II has not fallen to Abomination. When the Fremen Namri reveals that the testing was ordered by Alia, he kills the man and escapes, sending a message to Duncan to set off the course of events that will force Stilgar to act. He takes temporary shelter with a new batch of smugglers before stealing an ornithopter. With it, he escapes to a rebel sietch, where Leto II and The Preacher arrive. Leto II takes him to Shuloch. After Leto II returns to Arrakeen and takes the throne, Gurney is assigned to Sietch Tabr as part of Stilgar's council.

=== Prequels and sequels ===
Gurney's character is further explored in the Prelude to Dune prequels (1999–2001) written by Brian Herbert, Frank Herbert's son, and Kevin J. Anderson.

According to the prequels, Gurney Halleck was born on Giedi Prime, the homeworld of House Harkonnen. After an incident with the local militia and the murder of his sister, he escaped Giedi Prime and aligned himself with the rogue House Vernius. Eventually, after a string of conflicts and the death of Earl Dominic Vernius, Gurney Halleck arrived at the Atreides homeworld of Caladan seeking the exiled Prince Rhombur Vernius. After helping reclaim the planet Ix for House Vernius, Halleck served House Atreides, eventually becoming Paul Atreides' weapons teacher.

In Chapterhouse: Dune (1985) it is revealed that the Tleilaxu Master Scytale possesses a hidden nullentropy capsule containing cells carefully and secretly collected by the Tleilaxu for millennia, including the cells of Paul Atreides, Duke Leto, Jessica, and Gurney. A ghola of Gurney is "conceived" in Sandworms of Dune (2007), a sequel to the original Frank Herbert series written by Brian Herbert and Kevin J. Anderson, but is killed during gestation in an act of sabotage.

== In adaptations ==
Gurney is portrayed by Patrick Stewart in the 1984 David Lynch film Dune. P. H. Moriarty plays the role in the 2000 Sci-Fi Channel TV miniseries Frank Herbert's Dune and its 2003 sequel, Frank Herbert's Children of Dune. The character is portrayed by Josh Brolin in the 2021 Denis Villeneuve film Dune, who reprised the role in the 2024 sequel Dune: Part Two. Brolin will return to the role for Dune: Part Three in 2026, which will be based on the novel Dune Messiah.

== Merchandising ==
A line of Dune action figures, styled after David Lynch's film, was released in 1984 by toy company LJN to lackluster sales. A figure of Gurney previewed in LJN's catalog was never produced.

== Family tree ==
House Atreides family tree

House Atreides
House Harkonnen
House Corrino	Baron Vladimir; Harkonnen	Tanidia Nerus (Note: The Prelude to Dune prequel series (1999–2001) establishes that Tanidia Nerus is an alias of Gaius Helen Mohiam.)
Anirul	Shaddam IV	Leto I Atreides	Lady Jessica (Note: In Dune (1965), Jessica is the concubine of Leto I, and Chani becomes the concubine of their son, Paul.)
Count Dalak; Kenola	Princess Wensicia	Princess Irulan	Paul Atreides	Chani
Josifa	Farad'n	Ghanima Atreides	Leto II Atreides	Leto II Atreides; The Elder (Note: The infant Leto II Atreides is murdered in Dune, and his brother Leto II is later also named after their grandfather, Leto I, in Children of Dune (1976).)	Duncan Idaho
Chalice	Rugi	Many generations (Note: Per God Emperor of Dune, Duncan Idaho gholas was used several times in Leto II's breeding program)	Alia Atreides	Hayt (Note: Hayt is a ghola of Duncan Idaho, a kind of clone made using his corpse.)
Moneo Atreides
Siona Atreides
Many generations
Miles Teg
Darwi Odrade
