= Bruce Pennington =

British painter (born 1944)

Bruce Pennington (born 10 May 1944) is a British painter, best known for his science fiction and fantasy novel cover art. Pennington's works have largely featured on the covers of novels of Isaac Asimov, Clark Ashton Smith, and Robert A. Heinlein, adopting both science fiction and fantastical themes.

Pennington's works are largely characterised by bold, daring colours; rich pinks and blues sustaining his continuing motifs of speculation, as well as precise brush strokes, harmonious pigment blending.

Pennington attended the Ravensbourne School of Art in Bromley during the early 1960s. He began working as a freelance illustrator in 1967. In 1976, Paper Tiger Books published an LP-sized graphic album, Eschatus, featuring Pennington's paintings inspired by the prophecies of Nostradamus. They followed this, in 1991, with a graphic album, Ultraterranium, collecting various private and commercial works.

== Selected works ==
- The Defence by Vladimir Nabokov, Panther Books, 1967
- Stranger in a Strange Land by Robert Heinlein, New English Library. 1970
- Dune by Frank Herbert
- Dune Messiah by Frank Herbert
- Children of Dune by Frank Herbert
- God Emperor of Dune by Frank Herbert
- Heretics of Dune by Frank Herbert
- Chapterhouse: Dune by Frank Herbert
- The Shadow of the Torturer by Gene Wolfe (1981 BSFA Award)
