= Dune 7 =

Dune 7 may refer to:

- Dune 7, working title of the unfinished seventh book in the Dune series by Frank Herbert, eventually written by Brian Herbert and Kevin J. Anderson as two books:
  - Hunters of Dune (2006)
  - Sandworms of Dune (2007)
  - "Dune 7", the original notes for a direct sequel to Chapterhouse: Dune (1985)
- Dune 7: Cartea Brundurilor (1997; Romanian: The Book of Brundus) a novel by Sebastian A. Corn (writing as Patrick Herbert)
- Dune 7 (Namibia), a very large sand dune and tourist attraction at Walvis Bay
- Dune 7, another name for the Big Daddy dune at Sossusvlei in Namibia

== See also ==
- Dune (disambiguation)
