= Gaius Helen Mohiam =

Fictional character in the Dune universe created by Frank Herbert

- Dune character
- Siân Phillips as Gaius Helen Mohiam in Dune (1984)
- First appearance: Dune (1963–65)
- Last appearance: Dune: Part Two (2024)
- Created by: Frank Herbert
- Portrayed by: Siân Phillips (1984 film); Zuzana Geislerová (2000 miniseries / 2003 sequel); Charlotte Rampling (2021 / 2024 films)

In-universe information
- Aliases: Prequels: Tanidia Nerus
- Title: Reverend Mother
- Affiliation: Bene Gesserit
- Children: Unnamed daughters; Prequels: Lady Jessica

Gaius Helen Mohiam is a fictional character in the Dune universe created by Frank Herbert. She is a Bene Gesserit Reverend Mother, and initially appears in the 1963–65 novel Dune and its 1969 sequel, Dune Messiah. Mohiam also has a major role in the Prelude to Dune prequel trilogy (1999–2001) and the Caladan Trilogy (2020–2022) by Brian Herbert and Kevin J. Anderson.

In Dune, Gaius Helen Mohiam is the Imperial Truthsayer, and the mentor of Lady Jessica, the Bene Gesserit concubine of Duke Leto Atreides. Mohiam is interested in Jessica's young son Paul Atreides, who is a key figure in the Bene Gesserit breeding program but has also displayed unusual potential. She ultimately loses any influence she may have had over Jessica or Paul, who ally themselves with the native Fremen of Arrakis and depose Padishah Emperor Shaddam IV. In Dune Messiah, Mohiam joins a conspiracy to remove Paul from power, which fails.

Gaius Helen Mohiam is portrayed by Siân Phillips in David Lynch's 1984 film Dune, by Zuzana Geislerová in the 2000 miniseries Frank Herbert's Dune and its 2003 sequel Frank Herbert's Children of Dune, and by Charlotte Rampling in the 2021 Denis Villeneuve film Dune and its 2024 sequel.

== Description ==
In the novel Dune, the Baron Vladimir Harkonnen has this impression of Gaius Helen Mohiam:

An old woman in a black aba robe with hood drawn down over her forehead detached herself from the Emperor's suite, took up station behind the throne, one scrawny hand resting on the quartz back. Her face peered out of the hood like a witch caricature—sunken cheeks and eyes, an overlong nose, skin mottled and with protruding veins.
The Baron stilled his trembling at the sight of her. The presence of the Reverend Mother Gaius Helen Mohiam, the Emperor's Truthsayer, betrayed the importance of this audience.

In Dune Messiah, Herbert notes that Mohiam's eyes are "dark with the blue brilliance of her melange addiction."

Novelist Brian Herbert, Frank Herbert's son and biographer, describes Mohiam as "a witch mother archetype".

== Appearances ==
=== Dune ===
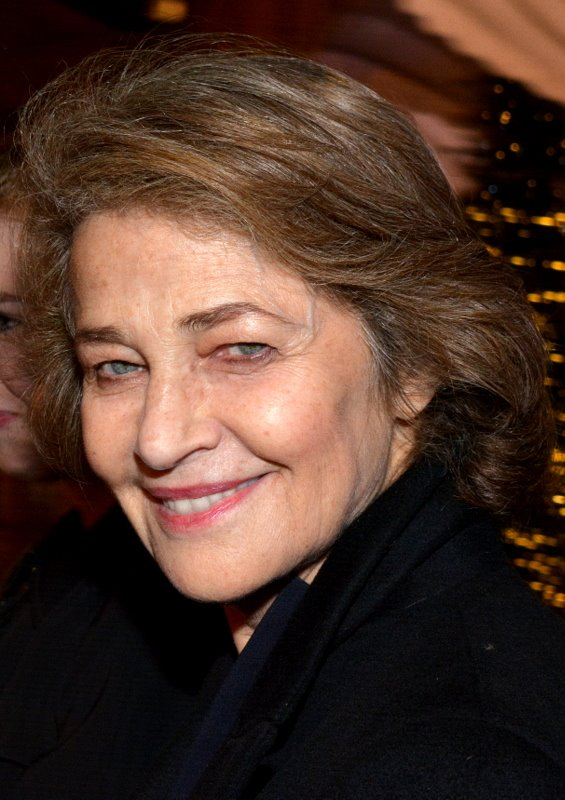
Charlotte Rampling portrays Gaius Helen Mohiam in the 2021 film Dune and its 2024 sequel Dune: Part Two.

As Dune begins, the "old crone" Reverend Mother Mohiam comes to Caladan to "test" young Paul Atreides before he departs for Arrakis. Having trained Paul's mother Lady Jessica at the Bene Gesserit school on Wallach IX decades before, Mohiam now holds a lethal gom jabbar to Paul's neck. If he withdraws his hand from a box that inflicts pain through direct nerve induction, the gom jabbar will kill him instantly. Mohiam explains to Paul that the purpose of the test is to discover whether Paul is "truly human", by requiring him to endure pain and still act rationally. He passes the test, and Mohiam (though still furious over Jessica's choice to disobey the Sisterhood and bear a son instead of a daughter) is somewhat intrigued by the potential she sees in 15-year-old Paul, as she notes he has withstood more pain than any other Bene Gesserit inductee.

Later, Mohiam accompanies Emperor Shaddam IV to Arrakis in her role as Imperial Truthsayer; there she is faced with Paul's four-year-old sister, the pre-born Alia, whom she calls an Abomination. Mohiam is further alarmed as she witnesses the ritual battle-to-the-death between Paul and Feyd-Rautha. Paul calls Feyd "cousin," revealing that Paul is aware of the secret that Baron Harkonnen is his grandfather. But Mohiam is most concerned with the potential outcome of the duel, which could prove to be "a major catastrophe for the Bene Gesserit breeding scheme." She realizes that "Two end products of this long and costly program faced each other in a fight to the death that might easily claim both of them. If both died here that would leave only Feyd-Rautha's bastard daughter, still a baby, an unknown, an unmeasured factor, and Alia, the Abomination."

Paul is victorious; seeing the inevitability of the situation he has orchestrated, Mohiam compels Shaddam to give in to Paul's demands, allowing Paul to depose him and become Emperor in his place.

=== Dune Messiah ===
In Dune Messiah, the Reverend Mother joins the conspiracy to topple the rule of Paul Atreides after he ascends the Golden Lion Throne and unleashes his Jihad upon the Empire. She, along with the Tleilaxu Face Dancer Scytale, the Spacing Guild Navigator Edric, and Paul's embittered consort (and Shaddam's daughter) Princess Irulan of House Corrino, plot to insinuate the Tleilaxu ghola Hayt into the court to weaken Paul's confidence in his prescience and thereby ruin him.

Forbidden to ever return to Arrakis, Mohiam is taken into Paul's custody when it becomes known that she is on a heighliner in orbit above the planet. Aware of the Bene Gesserit's desire to acquire his genetic material for their breeding program, Paul seeks to negotiate with Mohiam. In exchange for the guaranteed safety of his concubine Chani, and the Sisterhood's acceptance of his decision to father no heirs with Irulan, Paul offers something of the utmost value: his sperm. This is a complicated proposition for Mohiam, however, because artificial insemination is forbidden in the wake of the Butlerian Jihad.

When the conspiracy ultimately fails and Scytale is killed, Edric is executed in 10,207 A.G. by Fremen Naib Stilgar, on orders from Alia. Stilgar also puts Mohiam to death, despite previous orders from Paul to spare her life.

=== Prelude to Dune ===
In the Prelude to Dune series, Mohiam is instructed by the Bene Gesserit to collect the genetic material of Baron Vladimir Harkonnen (through conception) for their breeding program. She blackmails the homosexual Baron into fathering a child with her. When that daughter proves genetically undesirable, Mohiam kills it and then returns to Harkonnen for a second try, at which point he drugs and rapes her. She exacts her retribution by infecting him with a disease that later causes his obesity. Though Mohiam kills her first child with Harkonnen, their second child is Jessica, Harkonnen's paternity having been previously established in Dune.

According to Brian Herbert and Kevin J. Anderson, the idea that Mohiam is Jessica's mother was pulled directly from Frank Herbert's working notes for the original Dune series. To this end, they establish that the name given for Jessica's mother in Dune, Tanidia Nerus, is an alias used by Mohiam to conceal Jessica's maternity.

== In adaptations ==
Mohiam is portrayed by Siân Phillips in David Lynch's 1984 film Dune, and by Zuzana Geislerová in the 2000 miniseries Frank Herbert's Dune and its 2003 sequel Frank Herbert's Children of Dune. The character is played by Charlotte Rampling in the 2021 Denis Villeneuve film Dune and its 2024 sequel Dune: Part Two.

All three portrayals received positive reviews in contemporary press. Variety wrote of the 1984 film that "Siân Phillips has some mesmerizing moments as a powerful witch". Phillips said that she and Lynch both independently came up with the idea for her character's distinctive bald appearance. Tor.com noted of Children of Dune, "There are other moments of perfect execution ... The dual conversations between Irulan and Reverend Mother Gaius Helen Mohiam—and later Jessica—are gorgeous, offering subtitles to their sign language while an entirely different conversation plays out in words." Screen Rant called Rampling's Mohiam in the 2021 film Dune "one of the movie's more intimidating characters", and The Telegraph described her as "blood-chilling". The Los Angeles Times wrote that Rampling "is the only actor living who can project both world-weary wisdom and utter ruthlessness while wearing an absurdly high hat and a nearly impenetrable black veil ... her relationship with acolyte Lady Jessica plays a bit like a perpetually skeptical head of the CIA dealing with an exasperating but productive rogue agent."

== Family tree ==
House Atreides family tree

House Atreides
House Harkonnen
House Corrino	Baron Vladimir; Harkonnen	Tanidia Nerus (Note: The Prelude to Dune prequel series (1999–2001) establishes that Tanidia Nerus is an alias of Gaius Helen Mohiam.)
Anirul	Shaddam IV	Leto I Atreides	Lady Jessica (Note: In Dune (1965), Jessica is the concubine of Leto I, and Chani becomes the concubine of their son, Paul.)
Count Dalak; Kenola	Princess Wensicia	Princess Irulan	Paul Atreides	Chani
Josifa	Farad'n	Ghanima Atreides	Leto II Atreides	Leto II Atreides; The Elder (Note: The infant Leto II Atreides is murdered in Dune, and his brother Leto II is later also named after their grandfather, Leto I, in Children of Dune (1976).)	Duncan Idaho
Chalice	Rugi	Many generations (Note: Per God Emperor of Dune, Duncan Idaho gholas was used several times in Leto II's breeding program)	Alia Atreides	Hayt (Note: Hayt is a ghola of Duncan Idaho, a kind of clone made using his corpse.)
Moneo Atreides
Siona Atreides
Many generations
Miles Teg
Darwi Odrade
