= Alia Atreides =

Fictional character in the Dune universe created by Frank Herbert

- Dune character
- Daniela Amavia as Alia in the Children of Dune miniseries (2003)
- First appearance: Dune (1963–1965)
- Last appearance: Dune: Part Two (2024)
- Created by: Frank Herbert
- Portrayed by: Alicia Witt (1984 film); Laura Burton (2000 series); Daniela Amavia (2003 series); Anya Taylor-Joy (2024 film / 2026 sequel)

In-universe information
- Title: Imperial Regent
- Occupation: Reverend Mother
- Affiliation: Bene Gesserit; Fremen
- Family: House Atreides
- Spouse: Hayt (Duncan Idaho)
- Relatives: Leto I Atreides (father); Lady Jessica (mother); Paul Atreides (brother); Leto (nephew; died as infant); Leto II Atreides (nephew); Ghanima Atreides (niece); Vladimir Harkonnen (grandfather); Tanidia Nerus (grandmother); Prequels: Paulus Atreides (grandfather); Helena Richese (grandmother)

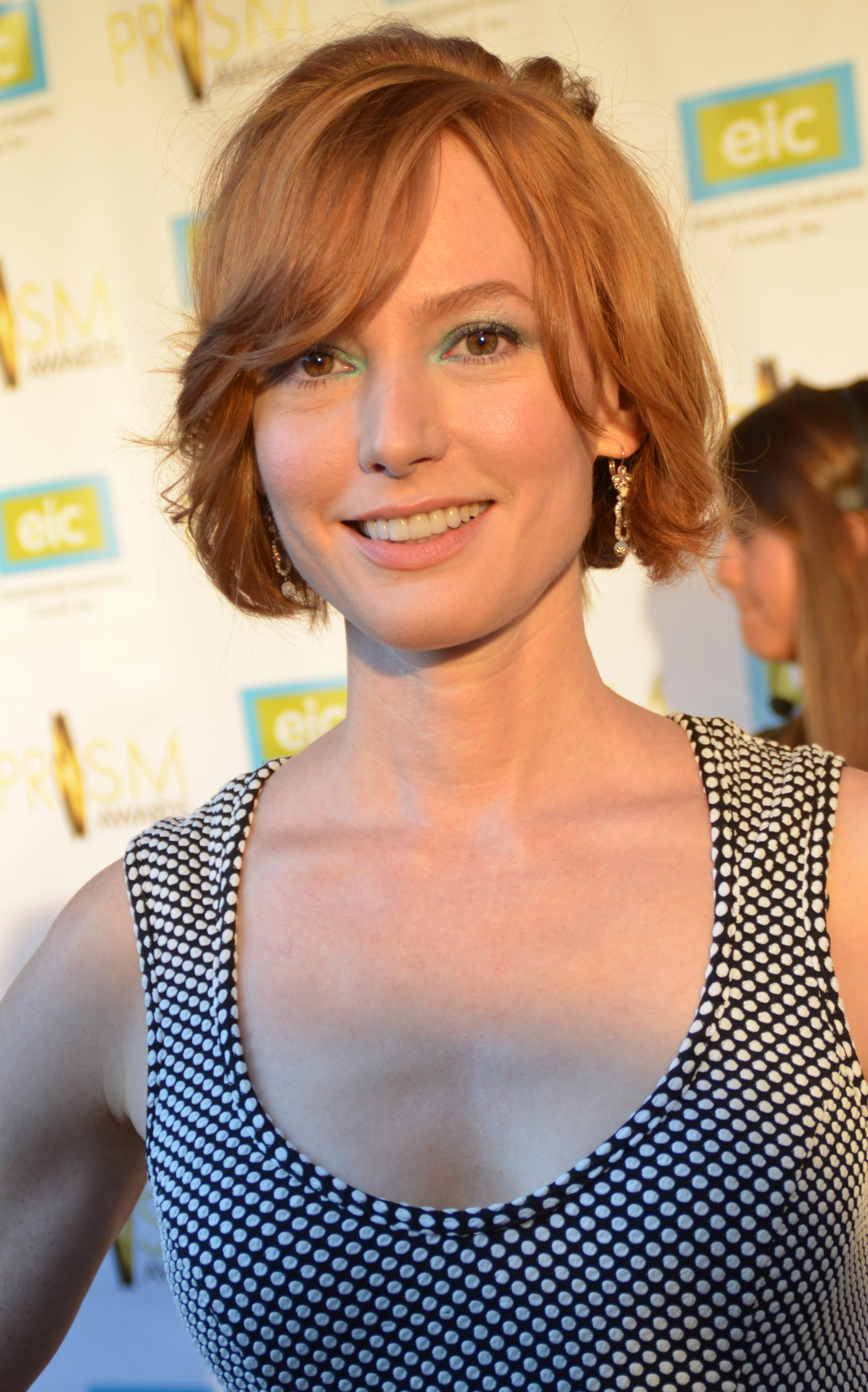
As a child actress, Alicia Witt portrayed Alia in the 1984 film Dune.

Alia Atreides (/əˈliːə əˈtreɪɪdiːz/) is a fictional character in the Dune universe created by Frank Herbert. She was introduced in the first novel of the series, 1965's Dune, and was originally killed in Herbert's first version of the manuscript. At the suggestion of Analog magazine editor John Campbell, Herbert kept her alive in the final draft. Alia would next appear as a main character in both Dune Messiah (1969) and Children of Dune (1976). The character is brought back as a ghola in the Brian Herbert/Kevin J. Anderson conclusion to the original series, Sandworms of Dune (2007).

In the novels, Alia is the daughter of Duke Leto Atreides of Caladan and his Bene Gesserit concubine, Lady Jessica, and the younger sister to Paul Atreides. Born on the planet Arrakis eight months after her father's death, she possesses the full powers of an adult Bene Gesserit Reverend Mother. Later known to her followers as St. Alia of the Knife, Alia is considered an Abomination by the Bene Gesserit because of the unique nature of her birth. As an adult, she becomes a devoted ally to Paul, and later regent for his children. She marries the ghola Duncan Idaho, but becomes possessed by the persona of her deceased maternal grandfather, Baron Vladimir Harkonnen.

Alia is portrayed by Alicia Witt in David Lynch's 1984 film adaptation, by Laura Burton in the 2000 miniseries Frank Herbert's Dune, by Daniela Amavia in its 2003 sequel, Frank Herbert's Children of Dune, and by Anya Taylor-Joy in a cameo appearance in Denis Villeneuve's 2024 film Dune: Part Two. Taylor-Joy will reprise her role in Dune: Part Three.

== Description ==
The daughter of Duke Leto Atreides of Caladan and his Bene Gesserit concubine, Lady Jessica, Alia is the younger sister to Paul Atreides. During the events of Dune, Alia is born on the planet Arrakis in the year 10,191 A.G., eight months after her father's death. Because of the unique nature of her birth she possesses the consciousness of an adult Reverend Mother; thus she is considered an Abomination by the Bene Gesserit. The Fremen woman Harah notices that four-year-old Alia "only pretends to be a little girl, that she has never been a little girl." She seeks to explain Alia's unique nature to the superstitious and wary Fremen. In the later years of her regency, Alia's enemies and victims among the Fremen call her Coan-Teen, "the female death spirit who walks without feet." An adult Alia is described by Herbert in Dune Messiah:

Her features lay exposed—blue-in-blue "spice eyes," her mother's oval face beneath a cap of bronze hair, small nose, mouth wide and generous.

Novelist Brian Herbert, Frank Herbert's son and biographer, describes Alia as a "virgin witch" archetype. William Touponce explains, "Alia is the archetypal virgin-harlot, a Reverend Mother without motherhood, virgin priestess, witch, and object of fearful veneration for the superstitious masses".

== Appearances ==
=== Dune ===
In Dune (1965), Alia is born a full Reverend Mother when she is exposed to the Water of Life (the bile of a drowned sandworm) in the womb as Lady Jessica undergoes the spice agony. Children born this way, called Abominations, are killed by the Bene Gesserit whenever possible because they have little defense against the personalities contained in Other Memory, the Bene Gesserit ability to access ancestral egos and memories. Without the existence of a strong personal identity, a child awakened to consciousness in utero is highly susceptible to becoming possessed by one of her ancestors. Jessica, despite her awareness of this likelihood, brings her baby to term, and Alia slowly learns to control the powers she has been granted as Reverend Mother and sister of the Kwisatz Haderach.

Alia is raised in a community of Fremen, led by her brother in an effort to control the planet and its production of melange. Alia is captured and the infant Leto killed in a Sardaukar raid on the sietch; she is presented to the Padishah Emperor Shaddam IV, who notes that she had been "in command of one of the attacking groups" of Fremen rebels ("mostly of women, children, and old men") that nearly decimated his raiding party. Mature far beyond her four years, Alia escapes during the final battle of Arrakeen, but not before pricking her grandfather, Baron Harkonnen, with a deadly, poisoned gom jabbar, also revealing her direct lineage to him in the process. Afterwards, she wanders the battlefield of Arrakeen killing fallen Sardaukar and Harkonnen soldiers with a crysknife, earning her the holy epithet "St. Alia of the Knife."

Alia uses her limited prescience in a unique way, projecting thoughts and images into the mind of the horrified Imperial Truthsayer, Gaius Helen Mohiam. Bene Gesserit Mohiam tells the Emperor that it is "Not telepathy. She's in my mind. She's like the ones before me, the ones who gave me their memories. She stands in my mind! She cannot be there, but she is!" Alia further explains that she cannot do this with everyone: "Unless I'm born as you, I cannot think as you." Alia soon communicates with Paul the same way:

Of all the uses of time-vision, this was the strangest. "I have breasted the future to place my words where only you can hear them," Alia had said. "Even you cannot do that, my brother. I find it an interesting play. And ... oh, yes—I've killed our grandfather, the demented old Baron. He had very little pain."

Touponce suggests that Herbert's depiction of larval sandworms (or sandtrout), which hold back water in the desert to maintain the arid conditions their sandworm vector requires to thrive, is "an analogy for a stage of consciousness Alia can feel. Some of the ancestral voices within her mind hold back dangerous forces that could destroy her."

=== Dune Messiah ===
In Dune Messiah (1969), teenaged Alia is worshipped as a saint, and the avatar of Paul's religion. A 22-meter tall statue of her stands in the Grand Reception Hall of Paul's immense Grand Palace in Arrakeen, and he has built a temple dedicated to her, known as Alia's Fane. Alia is further explored in the novel through her relationship with the ghola Hayt, who is Paul's teacher, Duncan Idaho, brought back from the dead by Tleilaxu means. Throughout the novel, there are hints of sexual tension between them as they work together to unravel the conspiracy against the Atreides. Hayt even steals a kiss from Alia, which upsets her; he responds by saying that he took nothing more than what was offered. Alia eventually agrees. When a blinded Paul departs into the desert, as is the Fremen custom for the blind, Alia is named Regent and the guardian of Paul's children: the heir, Leto II, and his sister, Ghanima. Shortly after, Alia marries Hayt, who has regained his full memory and is completely restored as Duncan. Alia gives the order to Fremen leader Stilgar to execute the Reverend Mother Mohiam and Spacing Guild Navigator Edric after the failure of their conspiracy (with the Tleilaxu Face Dancer Scytale and the Princess Irulan of House Corrino) to seize the throne from Paul.

Touponce notes that "Alia will come to sexual maturity in [Dune Messiah] and discover an ascendant desire for a mate and political power." Hayt has been programmed by the Tleilaxu with three functions to be used against the Atreides, one of which is the seduction of Alia.

=== Children of Dune ===
In Children of Dune (1976), Alia becomes progressively more devious and power-hungry as she slowly succumbs to Abomination. Falling under the influence of the persona of her deceased grandfather, the Baron Harkonnen, Alia abuses her powers as Regent and becomes a ruthless tyrant. She allows the Baron access to her senses in exchange for his help fighting off the other personalities within her, but his sexual proclivities soon control her, compelling her to engage in sexual acts with one of her aides. During the exercise of his Mentat powers, Duncan comes to the realization that Alia has fallen into Abomination, and helps Jessica escape Alia's murderous plot.

The Preacher, actually Paul Atreides, returns once more to the steps of the temple and exposes Alia's conversion to Abomination to the Fremen. Her priests soon murder him, as Alia's nephew Leto II returns from hiding, his sister Ghanima in tow. The twins offer Alia their help conquering her inner lives, as they had. Alia then loses all control over the other personalities within her and they all fight for dominance over her. Leto realizes that the Baron's hold over her is too strong, and provides two options: a Trial of Possession, an ancient ritual that would guarantee the Baron's undoing; and the open window, high above the temple steps. As a helpless Jessica looks on, Alia regains control of her body long enough to leap out the window to her death.

=== Hunters of Dune ===
In the Brian Herbert/Kevin J. Anderson novel Hunters of Dune (2006), the Face Dancer Khrone manages to restore the memories of the Baron Vladimir Harkonnen ghola. The Baron is displeased to note that Alia's voice haunts him in his head, somehow in a reversal of the influence he had over her while she was in the throes of Abomination in Children of Dune. Although not possessing the body of the Baron, Alia taunts him mercilessly.

=== Sandworms of Dune ===
In Sandworms of Dune (2007), the voice of Alia continues to irk the Baron, driving him to frequent outbursts that confuse those around him. Alia is recreated as a ghola on the no-ship Ithaca; in an attempt to grow Alia exactly as she had been in life, the axlotl tank is flooded with a near-lethal dose of the spice melange. Although the Alia ghola shows a great deal more maturity than would be expected for her age, she does not display any Other Memory or signs of Abomination. The reincarnated Baron Harkonnen murders the four-year-old Alia ghola on the Ithaca, but is soon murdered himself by the Wellington Yueh ghola.

== In adaptations ==
Alia is portrayed by Alicia Witt in David Lynch's 1984 film adaptation, by Laura Burton in the 2000 miniseries Frank Herbert's Dune and by Daniela Amavia in its 2003 sequel, Frank Herbert's Children of Dune.

Alia appears briefly as an infant in one of Paul's visions of the future in the 2021 film Dune, which covers the first part of the book. The casting of Anya Taylor-Joy in Dune: Part Two as an adult Alia in a cameo appearance was kept secret until the February 2024 film premiere in London.

Laura Fries of Variety wrote in 2003, regarding the miniseries adaption of Alia, "Amavia and [Julie] Cox as the tortured Alia and the put-upon Irulan offer layered performances". Emmet Asher-Perrin of Tor.com called Amavia's portrayal of Alia a "highlight" of the miniseries, and praised the attention paid to Alia's character development. Asher-Perrin praised the miniseries' departure from the novel in regard to Alia's fate:

And rather than have Alia throw herself out a window to end her possession once and for all, the miniseries does something devastating—Alia stabs herself, and as she lies on the floor dying, Jessica takes her into her arms. In a moment of exact parallel between her child self in the Dune miniseries, Alia reaches up to touch her mother's tears, tastes them, then whispers, "I want my brother," before joining him in death. It is one of those rare moments that makes the book seem clumsy and frail by comparison.

In the scripting of 2024's Dune: Part Two, director Denis Villeneuve opted to compress the timeline of events in order to keep Jessica pregnant throughout the film, explaining that he considered it "really fresh and original to have a character who is pregnant and still a powerful woman, a central figure of the story." As a result of the change, the adaptation assigns aspects of Alia's role in the book's climax to Paul. Instead, Jessica communicates with the sentient fetus throughout the film, while an adult Alia (played by Taylor-Joy) appears in one of Paul's visions of the future. Villeneuve acknowledged "it's a strong curve that we took, but I felt that it was very close to the spirit of the book."

== Family tree ==
House Atreides family tree

House Atreides
House Harkonnen
House Corrino	Baron Vladimir; Harkonnen	Tanidia Nerus (Note: The Prelude to Dune prequel series (1999–2001) establishes that Tanidia Nerus is an alias of Gaius Helen Mohiam.)
Anirul	Shaddam IV	Leto I Atreides	Lady Jessica (Note: In Dune (1965), Jessica is the concubine of Leto I, and Chani becomes the concubine of their son, Paul.)
Count Dalak; Kenola	Princess Wensicia	Princess Irulan	Paul Atreides	Chani
Josifa	Farad'n	Ghanima Atreides	Leto II Atreides	Leto II Atreides; The Elder (Note: The infant Leto II Atreides is murdered in Dune, and his brother Leto II is later also named after their grandfather, Leto I, in Children of Dune (1976).)	Duncan Idaho
Chalice	Rugi	Many generations (Note: Per God Emperor of Dune, Duncan Idaho gholas was used several times in Leto II's breeding program)	Alia Atreides	Hayt (Note: Hayt is a ghola of Duncan Idaho, a kind of clone made using his corpse.)
Moneo Atreides
Siona Atreides
Many generations
Miles Teg
Darwi Odrade
