= Alien Encounters (TV series) =

Science fiction television series

Alien Encounters is a science fiction mini series on the Science Channel. The series explores how humanity might react to first-contact with aliens. The fictional series is presented as a documentary intermixed with commentary from scientists and sci-fi writers. The series begins with an alien signal detected by the SETI Institute and follows through alien contact and the creation of hybrids ("Brids") based on alien DNA.

== Episodes ==
The series had the following episodes:

=== Season 1 ===
There are 2 episodes in the first season.

| # | Title | Original release date |
|---|---|---|
| 1 | "The Message" | March 13, 2012 |
Human race reacts to a message from space.
| 2 | "The Arrival" | March 20, 2012 |
Humans react to learning that an alien spaceship is en route to Earth.

=== Season 2 ===
There are 2 episodes in the second season.

| # | Title | Original release date |
|---|---|---|
| 1 | "The Invasion" | March 5, 2013 |
Alien spacecraft deposit thousands of pods on the Earth's surface.
| 2 | "The Offspring" | March 12, 2013 |
Humans learn to coexist with the ever shrinking multiplying alien pods.

=== Season 3 ===
There are 6 episodes in season three.

| # | Title | Original release date |
|---|---|---|
| 1 | "The Seventh Sense (working title: The Aura)" | May 27, 2014 |
A Turkish physicist discovers blueprints to a quantum computer.
| 2 | "The Entanglement" | June 3, 2014 |
Quantum supercomputer, "Quincy", is built that allows hybrid human children with alien DNA to connect to it telepathically.
| 3 | "The Prophecies" | June 10, 2014 |
Quincy becomes self-aware and is able to calculate future events.
| 4 | "The Escalation" | June 17, 2014 |
The U.S. government plans an attack on Quincy.
| 5 | "The War" | June 24, 2014 |
After an attack on the quantum super-computer fails, the U.S. government plans to attack the network. A mysterious box surfaces out of the alien trash orbiting Earth.
| 6 | "The Time Machine" | July 1, 2014 |
The quantum computer manages to distribute the cloud before being destroyed. Information about an inbound comet is released.

== Recurring Commentators ==
Recurring commentators included:

- Anthony D. Call - Narrator
- Ariel Anbar - Director, ASU Astrobiology Program
- Jeffrey L. Bada - Distinguished Professor of Marine Chemistry, UCSD
- David Brin - Astronomer, Author, NASA Consultant
- Paul Davies - Physicist, Director of the Beyond Center at Arizona State University
- Alan Dean Foster - Author
- David Gerrold - Author, Screen Writer
- Kevin R. Grazier - Planetary Scientist
- Alex Lightman - Author, Entrepreneur, Futurist
- Malcolm Maciver - Neuroscientist, Mechanical Engineer, Northwestern University
- Hakeem Oluseyi - Astrophysicist, Florida Tech
- Nick Sagan - Author
- John Scalzi - Author
- Seth Shostak - Astronomer, SETI Institute
- Joan Slonczewski - Microbiologist, Author
- Jill Tarter - Author, SETI Institute
- Neil deGrasse Tyson - Astrophysicist, author, and Director of the Hayden Planetarium
- Douglas Vakoch - Psychologist, SETI Institute

== See also ==
- Astrobiology
- Cultural impact of extraterrestrial contact
- First contact (science fiction)
- SETI@home
