= The Science of Dune =

2007 book edited by Kevin R. Grazier

- Editor: Kevin R. Grazier
- Language: English
- Subject: Dune franchise
- Genre: Science fiction
- Publisher: BenBella Books
- Publication date: 2007
- Publication place: United States
- Media type: Print (Hardback)
- Pages: 489
- ISBN: 978-19337-7128-1
- OCLC: 317815278

The Science of Dune: An Unauthorized Exploration into the Real Science Behind Frank Herbert's Fictional Universe is a 2007 book edited by Kevin R. Grazier and published by BenBella Books. As the name implies, it focuses on the real science behind various elements of the science and technology in the Dune universe.

== Contents ==
The book has sixteen topical chapters following an introduction. Contributors to the volume include anthropologist Sharlotte Neely (author of the chapter on "The Anthropology of Dune") and the editor, planetary physicist Kevin R. Grazier, himself (chapters "The Real Stars of Dune", "Suspensor of Disbelief" and "Cosmic Origami").

== Reception ==
A review for Booklist stated that "the authors represented in this fascinating collection pay homage to Herbert's vision while analyzing the scientific plausibility of the Dune universe's many idiosyncrasies", highlighting a "treatise on melange", an examination of "the biology of sandworm", and essays on the desert ecology of Arrakis; the "feasibility of water-conserving still-suits"; and the science behind interstellar travel.

A reviewer for the Science News similarly noted that the volume contains numerous chapters written by scientists and science writers who engage in conjecture about "the biological, physical, and chemical feasibility" of Herbert's world. In addition to the topics mentioned by the previous reviewer, they also highlighted the chapter on the plausibility of human evolution without the pressures of natural selection.

Reviewing the book for the Daily Camera, Clay Evans wrote that the book is a well-executed representation of a subgenre that also includes similar analyses of the fictional world created by J. R. R. Tolkien. It explores Herbert's desert planet and the surrounding universe with intricate details about various cultures, religions, and politics, alongside fascinating but less-developed technologies. In Evans' view, it effectively illustrates the scope of Herbert's imagination, while clarifying which parts are plausible and which are fanciful. The volume authors comprise enthusiastic Dune scholarly fans from diverse fields, featuring essays from biologists, physicists, and anthropologists, among others, all engaged in deconstructing Herbert's imaginative creations. Evans recommended the book to dedicated fans of the franchise, noting that they are the intended audience, while providing the caveat that their suspension of disbelief might be negatively affected by reading it.

Neale Monks reviewed the book for SF Crowsnest, concluding that "the quality of what's presented here varies", identifying the chapters on memory and stars as particularly strong and the chapter on anthropology as comparatively weak. Monks found the work to be inferior to the earlier The Dune Encyclopedia (1984), but said that "it does benefit from being written from our perspective and through the lens of early 21st century science".

== See also ==
- The Dune Encyclopedia
