= Kevin Grazier =

American planetary physicist

Kevin R. Grazier
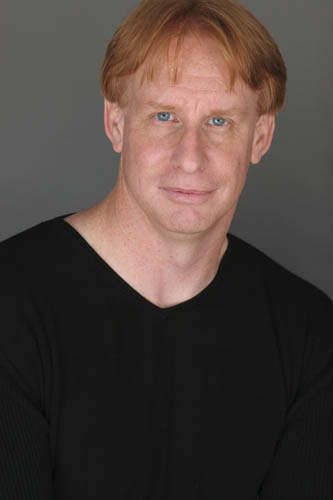
- Kevin Grazier in 2015
- Born: Cleveland, Ohio, U.S.
- Education: Purdue University (two B.S., M.S.); Oakland University (B.S.); University of California, Los Angeles (M.S., Ph.D.)
- Occupation: Physicist
- Known for: Planetary Scientist, Author, Science Advisor for TV and Film

Kevin R. Grazier is an American planetary physicist, known for his work on the Cassini/Huygens Mission to Saturn and Titan where he had the dual roles of Science Planning Engineer and Investigation Scientist for the Imaging Science Subsystem instrument. He is an expert in computational methods and planetary dynamics and performs large-scale, long-term simulations of early Solar System evolution, dynamics, and chaos.

Grazier has over two dozen technical publications in planetary science, astrobiology, numerical analysis, computer science, and spacecraft operations journals. He is also the science consultant for several television series and movies, most notably the series Defiance, Battlestar Galactica, and Eureka, and the films Gravity and Pirates of the Caribbean: Dead Men Tell No Tales. Grazier has written and/or edited several popular science books. He is from Sterling Heights, Michigan.

== Education ==
Grazier attended Purdue University on an NROTC scholarship, but due to an ankle surgery before his final semester, he was disqualified from further military service. Grazier has Bachelor's degrees in Computer Science and Geology, and a Master's degree in Physics, from Purdue University. He also has a bachelor's degree in Physics from Oakland University, and a master's degree in Geophysics and Space Physics from the University of California, Los Angeles (UCLA). His doctoral work was at UCLA, which lead to a PhD in Planetary Physics with advisor William I. Newman on "The Stability of Planetesimal Niches in the Outer Solar System: A Numerical Investigation". When Grazier started getting recurring entertainment industry consulting work, he returned to UCLA, and earned a certificate in television screenwriting.

== Career ==
=== RAND Corporation ===
While a graduate student at UCLA, Grazier worked at the RAND Corporation in nearby Santa Monica, processing Viking Mars imagery in support of the Mars Observer Mission. When the spacecraft was lost during orbit insertion, support for the work came to an immediate end.

=== Cassini/Huygens Mission to Saturn and Titan ===
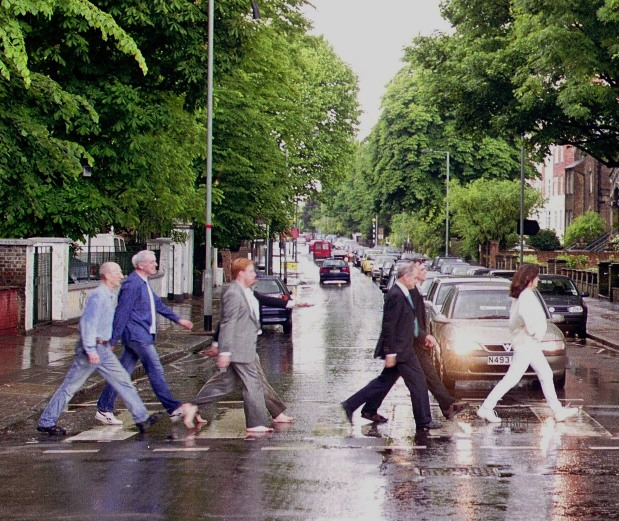
Grazier (as Paul) re-enacting the famous Beatles photograph at Abbey Road along with the other members of the Cassini Imaging Team led by Team Leader Carolyn Porco.

Grazier was hired at the Jet Propulsion Laboratory while still in graduate school to write mission planning and analysis software, used primarily by the Cassini/Huygens Mission. Upon completion of his Ph.D., he was hired full-time onto Cassini as a Science System Engineer (later Science Planning Engineer) and, a short time later, as Investigation Scientist for the Imaging Science Subsystem—the visible light camera aboard the spacecraft. As a Science Planning Engineer, Grazier co-wrote an award-winning program called EVENTS which determined event times when spacecraft can make many different types of observations. Later, Grazier created the Cassini Tour Atlas, a large database with geometrical values and event times, used for mission and observation planning, flight rule constraint checking, and data analysis. Grazier led a small team that designed software to automatically regenerate the Tour Atlas for hypothetical spacecraft trajectories, or when the actual trajectory was subject to change. This software saved Cassini an estimated quarter of a million dollars, and earned a NASA Space Act Award, a NASA Board Act Award, and a NASA Tech Brief Award.

=== United States Military Academy ===
From July 2016 to July 2018, Grazier was an Assistant Professor of Computer Science at the U.S. Military Academy in West Point, NY.

=== Astronomy Educator ===
Grazier has been an adjunct professor of astronomy at both Santa Monica College and Pierce College, having also taught evening classes on astronomy and the "Science of Science Fiction" at UCLA. From 1995 until 2011 he was a planetarium lecturer at Griffith Observatory, and performed over 700 planetarium shows.

=== Public Speaking ===
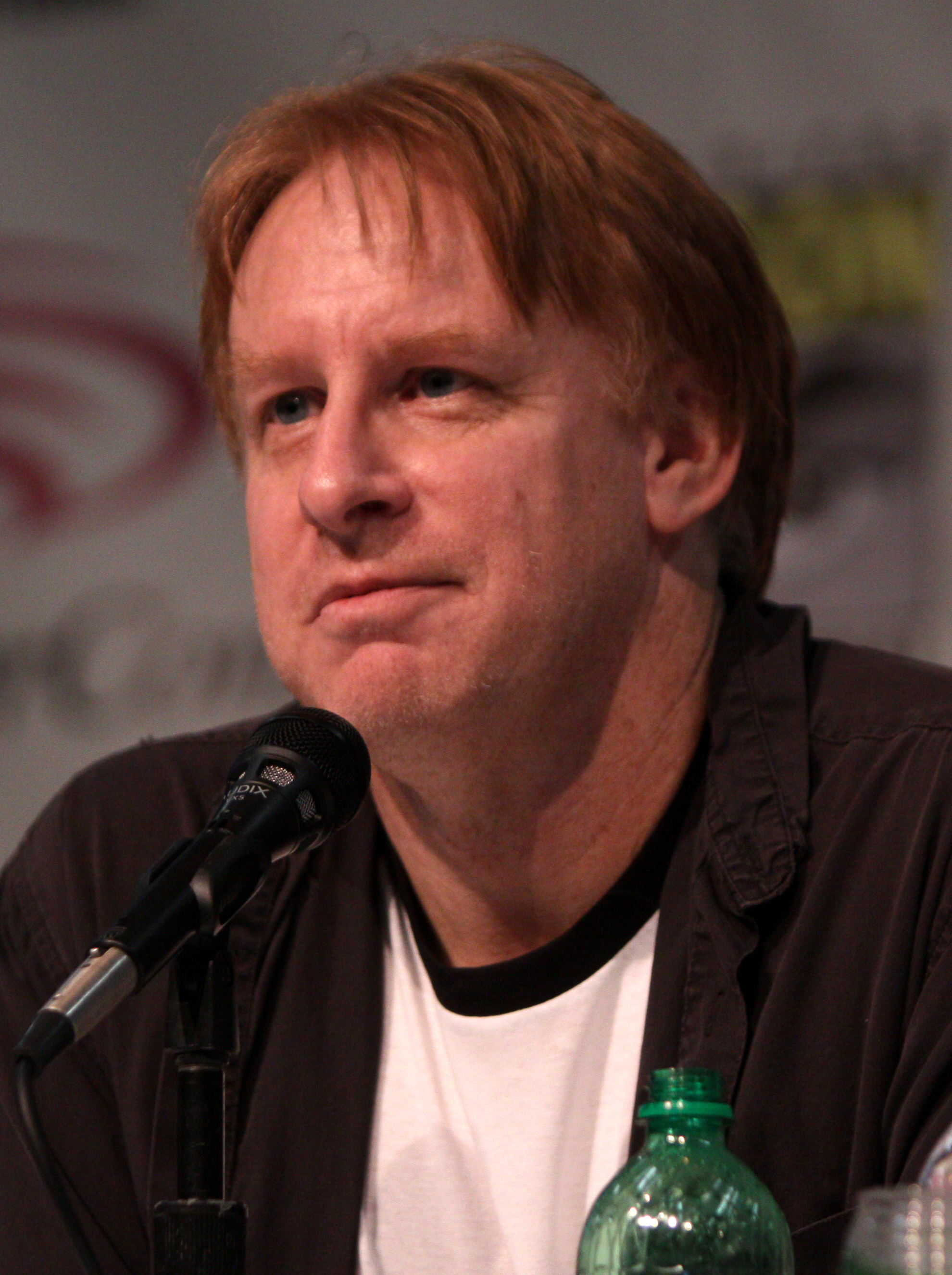
Grazier speaking at the 2013 WonderCon.

Grazier is a frequent public speaker about science, space, technology, and the portrayal of science and scientists by the entertainment industry. He has spoken to K-12 and college classes, given commencement addresses, spoken at film festivals, and gave a TEDx talk about the search for life in the Solar System. In 2011, he was the guest lecturer at the Launch Pad Workshop—held every year at the University of Wyoming in Laramie—that teaches writers basic physics and astronomy. He was a featured speaker at the 50th Anniversary Celebration of the Purdue University Department of Computer Sciences, as well as at the 2015 Stories about Science Conference at the University of Manchester in the UK, and the Communicating Science to the Public Conference in Cambridge, MA. He appears frequently at science fiction conventions, in particular Dragon*Con in Atlanta and San Diego Comic-Con.

=== NASA Consultant ===
Since 2001 Grazier has been consulting on NASA educational product review panels.

=== Science Advisor ===
Grazier and co-author Ges Seger submitted an unsolicited Star Trek: Voyager script to Paramount whilst Grazier was in grad school at UCLA. Based upon the strength of that script, they were invited by showrunner Jeri Taylor to pitch stories to the writing staff. At Paramount, Grazier met staff writers Bryan Fuller and Michael Taylor. It was Fuller who pitched Grazier to Ronald D. Moore as the science advisor on Battlestar Galactica in 2003, and he has been a consultant for Hollywood productions since.

==== TV series ====
Start year	End year	Name	Reference(s)
2014	2014	Ascension	
		Battlestar Galactica	
2012	2012	Battlestar Galactica: Blood & Chrome	
2011	--	Defiance	
2005	2011	Eureka	
2011	2015	Falling Skies	
		The Event	
		The Zula Patrol	

==== Films ====
Year	Name	Reference(s)
2013	Gravity	
2014	ETXR	
2016	Inversion	
2017	Pirates of the Caribbean: Dead Men Tell No Tales	

==== Shorts ====
Year	Name	Reference(s)
2012	D.N.E.: Do Not Erase	

== Books ==
- Hollyweird Science: The Next Generation: From Spaceships to Microchips (co-authored by Stephen Cass, 2017)
- Hollyweird Science: From Quantum Quirks to the Multiverse (co-authored by Stephen Cass, 2015)
- Hollywood Chemistry: When Science Met Entertainment (editor and contributing author, 2011)
- The Science of Battlestar Galactica (co-author, 2010)
- Fringe Science: Parallel Universes, White Tulips, and Mad Scientists, editor.
- The Science of Michael Crichton, editor
- The Science of Dune: An Unauthorized Exploration into the Real Science Behind Frank Herbert's Fictional Universe, editor and contributing author.
- Essay in Halo Effect: The Unauthorized Look at the Most Successful Video Game of All Time on the science behind Halo.

== TV appearances ==
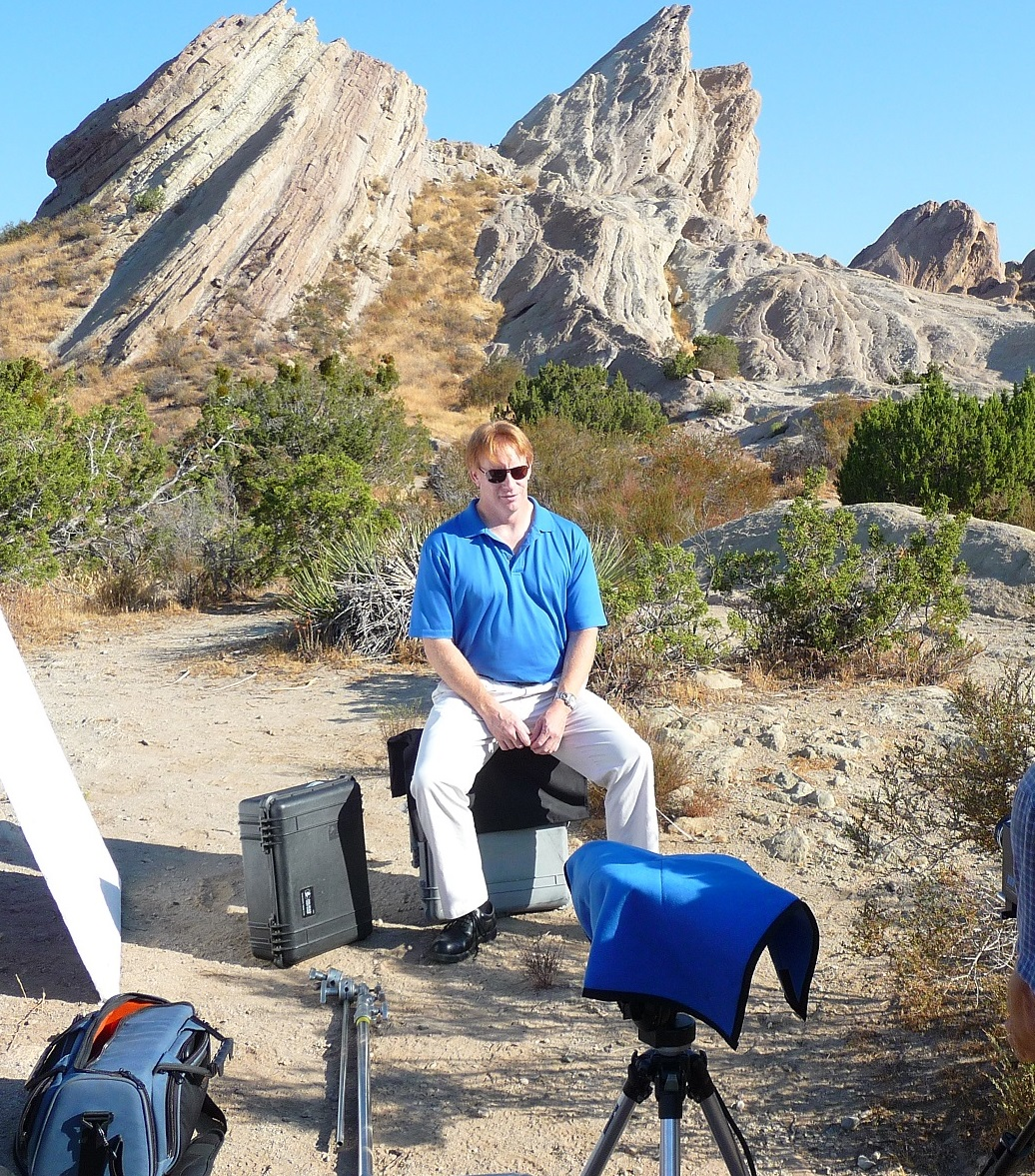
Dr. Kevin Grazier shooting the episode "Science Fiction / Science Fact" for History Channel's series "The Universe"

- The Universe (TV series)
- Alien Encounters (TV series)
- Naked Science
- NASA's Unexplained Files

== Awards and honors ==
While at JPL, Grazier won numerous JPL and NASA technical and software awards, including two NASA Space Act Awards, two NASA Tech Brief Awards, a NASA New Technology Award, and a Multimission Ground Systems Office Achievement Award.

In 2001, Grazier was the honorary chairperson of the first-ever Oakland University "Week of Champions" (homecoming) celebration.

In 2005, along with the cast and crew of Battlestar Galactica, Grazier won a George Foster Peabody Award, given yearly "For significant and meritorious achievement in broadcasting and cable."

In 2008, he attended the invitation-only Sci-Foo unconference at Google Headquarters in Mountain View, CA.

in 2011, Grazier won the Oakland University Odyssey Award for the alumni whose career most typifies the university motto "To Seek Virtue and Knowledge."

In 2013, Grazier was honored as an Outstanding Alumnus by the Purdue University School of Science.
