= List of technology in the Dune universe =

Fictional technology

Technology is a key aspect of the fictional setting of the Dune series of science fiction novels written by Frank Herbert, and derivative works. Herbert's concepts and inventions have been analyzed and deconstructed in at least one book, The Science of Dune (2007). Herbert's original 1965 novel Dune is popularly considered one of the greatest science fiction novels of all time, and is frequently cited as the best-selling science fiction novel in history. Dune, and its five sequels by Herbert, explore the complex and multilayered interactions of politics, religion, ecology and technology, among other themes.

The Butlerian Jihad, an event in the back-story of Herbert's universe, leads to the outlawing of certain technologies, primarily "thinking machines", a collective term for computers and artificial intelligence of any kind. This prohibition is a key influence on the nature of Herbert's fictional setting. In Dune, ten thousand years after this jihad, its enduring commandment remains, "Thou shalt not make a machine in the likeness of a human mind."

== Atomics ==
Atomics is the term used to refer to nuclear weapons in the Dune universe. Like real-world nuclear weapons, atomics presumably are fission and/or thermonuclear weapons, and Herbert notes that "radiation lingers" after their use. However, the author never delves into the specifics of the technology or explores in detail how it may have evolved by the time of Dune's far-future setting.

In the initial Dune novels, the Great Houses of the Landsraad own "family atomics" as heirlooms, keeping a secure, hidden cache as weapons of last resort in their wars. Though such possession is necessary to secure power, the use of atomics against humans violates the chief prohibition of the Great Convention, the "universal truce enforced under the power balance maintained by the Guild, the Great Houses, and the Imperium". Paul Atreides notes in Dune that "The language of the Great Convention is clear enough: Use of atomics against humans shall be cause for planetary obliteration." The atomics themselves act as a military deterrent; any House which violates the Great Convention flagrantly (such as using atomics openly in warfare) faces massive retaliation from any number of the other Houses. As Paul notes via epigraph in Dune Messiah (1969), "any Family in my Empire could so deploy its atomics as to destroy the planetary bases of fifty or more other Families".

A stone burner is a conventional weapon that uses atomics for fuel. Whether they are covered by the Great Convention is discussed several times in the series, with the opinion that while they "skirt the intentions of the law" they do not warrant retaliation. The explosion and radiation can be precisely adjusted depending on the desired effect. Stone burners emit "J-rays", a form of radiation that destroys the eye tissue of anyone surviving the initial radiation blast. If of sufficient power, a stone burner can burn its way into the core of a planet, destroying it:

Paul remained silent, thinking what this weapon implied. Too much fuel in it and it'd cut its way into the planet's core. Dune's molten level lay deep, but the more dangerous for that. Such pressures released and out of control might split a planet, scattering lifeless bits and pieces through space.

=== The original series ===
In Dune, Paul uses an atomic device on the surface of Arrakis to blast a pass through the Shield Wall, a desert mountain range protecting the planet's capital. He says this act is in accordance with the Great Convention because the atomics are not used against humans, but rather against "a natural feature of the desert". A stone burner is used in an attempt to assassinate Paul in Dune Messiah; he survives but is blinded for the rest of his life. In God Emperor of Dune (1981), the God Emperor Leto II notes that since his 3,500-year reign began, he has "searched out all of the Family atomics and moved them to a safe place".

=== Prequels ===
In the Prelude to Dune prequel trilogy by Brian Herbert and Kevin J. Anderson (1999–2001) it is revealed that a renegade House of the Landsraad had devastated the capital of the Corrino Padishah Empire, Salusa Secundus, with atomics and rendered the planet essentially uninhabitable. Padishah Emperor Hassik Corrino III had relocated the Imperial throne to the planet Kaitain, and the attacking House had been subsequently exterminated. During the events of the series in 10,175 A.G., Padishah Emperor Shaddam IV uses atomics to destroy House Richese's artificial laboratory moon of Korona. Part of Shaddam's plan to ensure his own spice monopoly, the explosion causes a quarter of the planet Richese's population to go blind from the resulting light produced by the destruction of the Richesian mirrors stored on Korona. Finally, the persecuted Earl Dominic Vernius plans to use atomics to attack Kaitain; when his hidden base on Arrakis is discovered by the Padishah Emperor's Sardaukar army, Vernius ignites a stone burner to destroy himself and as many of the Sardaukar as he can.

The Legends of Dune prequel series (2002–2004) establishes that the first human victory of the Butlerian Jihad (the crusade against the thinking machines) is the 200 B.G. destruction of Earth and the Earth Omnius using atomics. "Pulse atomics" calibrated for use against the gel circuitry of the thinking machines are also used at the end of the war to systematically wipe out every single machine-controlled planet. It is this action, and the millions of human slaves who are killed in it, which ultimately leads to the ban on atomic warfare in the Great Convention. It also contributes to the development of the feud between the Harkonnens and Atreides.

== Axlotl tank ==
Axlotl tanks are a fictional biological technology in the Dune universe created by Frank Herbert. Axlotl technology is also mentioned in Herbert's novels Destination: Void and The Jesus Incident but not elaborated upon.

A trade secret of the Tleilaxu, an axlotl tank is a "device for reproducing a living human being from the cells of a cadaver", a type of clone called a ghola. Axlotl tanks are eventually revealed to be semi-artificial uteri created by transforming women into biological factories. Later in the series, the Tleilaxu scientists also use the axlotl tanks to replicate the spice melange, previously only available on the desert planet Arrakis where it is created naturally as part of the life cycle of giant sandworms.

=== The original series ===
The tanks are briefly mentioned in Dune Messiah (1969) as the source of the Duncan Idaho ghola. (Note: Both mentions of the tanks are spelled "axolotl" in Dune Messiah, but Herbert spells the term "axlotl" in all later novels in the series.) Their nature is a well-guarded Tleilaxu secret. During his 3500-year reign which ends in God Emperor of Dune (1981), Leto II purchases countless Idaho gholas produced for him in the tanks.

Within the 1500 years between the events of God Emperor of Dune and Heretics of Dune (1984), the Tleilaxu discover an artificial method of producing the spice melange in their axlotl tanks as well. Some melange users, like the Bene Gesserit, prefer the natural melange of Arrakis to the Tleilaxu substitute, claiming increased potency.

In Heretics of Dune, Miles Teg recalls how his Bene Gesserit mother Lady Janet had said that "No one outside of [the Tleilaxu] planets has ever reported seeing a Tleilaxu female." Wondering whether the Tleilaxu breed or simply rely on the tanks to reproduce, Miles had asked, "Do they exist or is it just the tanks?" Janet confirmed that females do indeed exist. Later in Heretics, Teg's own daughter, Reverend Mother Darwi Odrade, theorizes that the axlotl tanks may be, in fact, "surrogate mothers"—Tleilaxu females somehow transformed. Soon, the current Duncan ghola recalls his repeated "births" from the tanks:

The axlotl tanks! He remembered emerging time after time: bright lights and padded mechanical hands. The hands rotated him and, in the unfocused blurs of the newborn, he saw a great mound of female flesh—monstrous in her almost immobile grossness…a maze of dark tubes linked her body to giant metal containers.

In Chapterhouse: Dune (1985), the last remaining Tleilaxu Master Scytale is coerced into revealing the means of creating the tanks to the Bene Gesserit Sisterhood.

=== Sequels ===
In Hunters of Dune (2006) and Sandworms of Dune (2007), the novels by Brian Herbert and Kevin J. Anderson which complete Frank Herbert's original series, the Bene Gesserit on the no-ship Ithaca use the captive Scytale's knowledge to create their own axlotl tanks from Bene Gesserit volunteers. The Rabbi, leader of the group of "secret" Jews on board, is upset when his follower Rebecca, a "wild" Reverend Mother, volunteers herself for the process.

=== Prelude to Dune ===
In the Prelude to Dune prequel trilogy (1999–2001) by Brian Herbert and Kevin J. Anderson (set immediately prior to the events of 1965's Dune), the Tleilaxu attempt to create artificial melange called ajidamal using axlotl technology; the best results are gained by using a Bene Gesserit sister to create an axlotl tank. However, the project ultimately fails.

== Cymek ==
A cymek is a type of cyborg, or machine-human hybrid, in the fictional Dune prequel universe. They appear in the Legends of Dune prequel trilogy (2002–2004) by Brian Herbert and Kevin J. Anderson. The only organic part of a cymek is its brain; in the series, living humans willingly have their brains transplanted into large mechanized bodies with the intent of extending life indefinitely. The technology is later revived in the prequel novel Mentats of Dune (2014).

=== Legends of Dune ===
Over 11,000 years before the events of Frank Herbert's Dune (1965), a group of 20 ambitious humans see the stagnation of the Old Empire and realize that their small band can take control of it with the aid of thinking machines. Calling themselves the Titans, they rule humanity for a hundred years and rename themselves after famous historical and mythological figures, most notably Agamemnon, Ajax, Barbarossa, Dante, Hecate, Juno, Tlaloc and Xerxes.

Ten years into their reign, their leader Tlaloc is killed in a freak accident. Realizing their mortality and limited lifespans, they seek a way to extend their lives. Juno is inspired by the cogitors, ancient philosophers whose brains had been installed in fluid-filled canisters so that they might analyze the universe indefinitely; they are living and retain awareness and consciousness, and the ability to communicate should they choose. The Titan Agamemnon is the first to become a cymek, his brain transplanted into a canister which, through special interfaces, is installed into a large, fearsome, and weaponized body. In cymek form, the remaining 19 Titans are virtually unstoppable, and continue their tyrannical rule of the universe for another 90 years. Growing complacent, the Titans are themselves overthrown and enslaved by Omnius, a sentient computer network given too much autonomy; Omnius controls the universe for the next 900 years. The Titans recruit humans from the enslaved, Omnius-controlled "Synchronized Worlds" to become neo-cymeks, footsoldiers who could more fully understand human strategy and thought processes than machines.

A small group of worlds, united as the League of Nobles, resist the initial Titan rebellion and remain free from machine rule. With the thinking machines ever-persistent in their intent to enslave or destroy all humans, the League initiates the Butlerian Jihad, mankind's century-long crusade against the machines. The humans are ultimately victorious, destroying all but one hidden copy of Omnius as well as the Titans, the neo-cymeks and all thinking machine forces. With all thinking machine technology henceforth banned, new organizations arise, composed of humans who had developed specialized skills during the Jihad to replace and exceed technology, including the Spacing Guild, Mentats, and the Bene Gesserit.

=== Great Schools of Dune ===
In Mentats of Dune (2014), a group of new cymeks are created by the human Dr. Ptolemy using the brains of failed Guild Navigators. Funded by Josef Venport as a counter to Manford Torondo and his fanatical mobs of anti-technology Butlerians, these cymeks are more advanced than their predecessors; a team of them manages to destroy a sandworm on Arrakis, though they are destroyed themselves. Ptolemy himself later willingly undergoes the surgery to have his brain placed in a cymek.

== Face Dancer ==
Face Dancers are a fictional servant caste of sterile humanoid shapeshifters in Frank Herbert's Dune universe. Created by the Bene Tleilax, they are able to physiologically change their appearance to impersonate other people. Face Dancers possess full sentience, but also genetically programmed loyalty to the Tleilaxu Masters. They are used by the Tleilaxu throughout the universe to replace people whom the Tleilaxu find useful, usually killing the originals. In this way they may infiltrate and control various groups in the universe. Face Dancers are "Jadacha hermaphrodites", able to change their gender at will. In Heretics of Dune (1984), Herbert describes a pair of Face Dancers in their natural state: "Two small men as alike as twins. Almost chinless round faces, pug noses, tiny mouths, black button eyes, and short-cropped white hair that stood up from their heads like the bristles on a brush." The Tleilaxu are able to control Face Dancers by forcing them into a hypnotic state with a predefined sound, often a specific humming or whistling noise. In Heretics of Dune, Master Waff attempts to control his Face Dancer duplicate of Hedley Tuek: "Humming sounds like the noises of angry insects came from his mouth, a modulated thing that clearly was some kind of language."

=== Original series ===
In Dune Messiah (1969), Tleilaxu Face Dancer Scytale enters into a conspiracy with the Bene Gesserit, Spacing Guild and House Corrino to remove Paul Atreides from the Imperial throne. Scytale is the architect of a multi-pronged plot against Paul centered on the Tleilaxu ghola Hayt, a reincarnation of Paul's friend Duncan Idaho who has been programmed to unwittingly destroy Paul psychologically, and failing that, kill Paul when triggered by an implanted command. Scytale also kills and replaces the Fremen girl Lichna to infiltrate Paul's household and lure him to an assassination attempt outside the safety of his stronghold. Paul's Bene Gesserit training allows him to detect the substitution, but he allows the plot to play out. All of these schemes fail to eliminate Paul, but set the stage for Scytale's final ploy: the unlocking of Duncan's memories in Hayt illustrates that the Tleilaxu can provide Paul with a fully realized ghola of his deceased concubine Chani, in exchange for his abdication. Paul refuses, and kills Scytale.

Over 3,500 years later in God Emperor of Dune (1981), Tleilaxu Face Dancers kill and replace nearly everyone in the Ixian embassy on Arrakis as part of an assassination attempt on Paul's seemingly immortal son, the God Emperor Leto II Atreides. Though these Face Dancers are more imperceptible than ever before, Leto and the Bene Gesserit Reverend Mother Anteac are able to detect the impostors thanks to the Bene Gesserit techniques of acute observation. Another 1,500 years later in Heretics of Dune (1984), the Tleilaxu have perfected their Face Dancers, who are now perfect mimics, able to copy the memories and consciousness of the people they imitate. Virtually undetectable to all but the Bene Gesserit, these Face Dancers begin to replace leaders in the Imperium as a means for the Tleilaxu to seize control. The plan fails as, over time, the Face Dancers come to believe they are the people they have copied, and elude their genetically-programmed loyalty to the Tleilaxu Masters. In Chapterhouse: Dune (1985), Duncan Idaho notes that the mysterious observers Daniel and Marty resemble Face Dancers, but atypically autonomous ones. Daniel and Marty later confirm that they are independent Face Dancers, noting "[The Tleilaxu] gave us the power to absorb the memories and experiences of other people ... The Masters should've known we would gather enough of them one day to make our own decisions about our own future."

=== Sequels ===
In Brian Herbert and Kevin J. Anderson's 2006 continuation of the original series, Hunters of Dune, the leaders of the Lost Tleilaxu have been killed and replaced by their own advanced Face Dancers, who cannot be detected by even the Bene Gesserit. The Face Dancer leader, Khrone, serves Daniel and Marty in their plot for domination of the universe, but has separate schemes of his own. Khrone's Face Dancers have secretly gained control of many power bases across the Empire, and Daniel and Marty are revealed to be new incarnations of mankind's ancient enemies, thinking machine leader Omnius and his second-in-command Erasmus, introduced in the Legends of Dune prequel trilogy by Brian Herbert and Anderson.

In the series finale, Sandworms of Dune (2007), it is revealed that Khrone and his legions of autonomous Face Dancers seek to overthrow their machine "masters". Secretly in control of Ix and its technology production, Khrone manipulates the Spacing Guild and New Sisterhood, setting them up for disastrous failure in their final battle against the thinking machine forces of Omnius. When Khrone asserts dominance over even the machine empire, a smug Erasmus activates a fail-safe built into all enhanced Face Dancers, instantly killing Khrone and all of his minions across the universe.

== Ghola ==
A ghola is a fictional humanoid in the Dune universe created by Frank Herbert. Similar to clones, they are "manufactured" human duplicates grown in an axlotl tank from cells collected from a deceased subject. A true ghola is initially shown to be the resurrection of a corpse through regrowth of damaged tissues, while later gholas in the series are more accurately described as clones—grown from genetic material extracted from a few cells (e.g. a small scraping of skin taken moments before death). Through specific stresses, gholas can be made to recall the memories of the original, including their moment of death. In Herbert's Dune series, the technological process is developed and initially monopolized by the Tleilaxu; in later novels the process is also used by the Bene Gesserit.

The first ghola featured in the series—Hayt in 1969's Dune Messiah—is a resurrection of the corpse of Duncan Idaho. Later gholas are grown from a few cells, as in the case of subsequent Idaho gholas provided to Leto II, as described in God Emperor of Dune (1981). The Tleilaxu can control their creations by forcing them into a hypnotic state with some predefined sound (often a specific humming or whistling noise) that has been pre-conditioned into each ghola. (Note: In Dune Messiah, the Tleilaxu dwarf Bijaz hums to activate dormant programming in the Duncan Idaho ghola Hayt to induce him to kill Paul Atreides: "He began to hum, a keening, whining monotonous theme, repeated over and over…Hayt stiffened, experiencing odd pains that played up and down his spine…The sound made Hayt think of ancient rituals, folk memories, old words and customs, half-forgotten meanings in lost mutterings.") (Note: In Heretics of Dune, Master Waff tries to control his Face Dancer duplicate of Hedley Tuek: "Humming sounds like the noises of angry insects came from his mouth, a modulated thing that clearly was some kind of language.") (Note: In Chapterhouse Dune, Scytale sees an opportunity to control/influence the Duncan Idaho ghola and thus effect his escape from the Bene Gesserit when he thinks: Somehow, I must contrive it that Idaho and I meet intimately. There's always the whistling language we impress on every ghola.)

Csilla Csori analyzes the concept of recording and restoring memories in the essay "Memory (and the Tleilaxu) Makes the Man" in The Science of Dune (2007).

=== The original series ===
Before the events of Dune: Messiah, gholas are merely physical copies without the memories of their original incarnations. The ghola Hayt is programmed by the Tleilaxu to kill Emperor Paul Atreides under post-hypnotic suggestion. The attempt fails but, as hoped by the Tleilaxu, the stress of attempting to kill someone who was deeply loved in the ghola's previous life breaks the mental barrier between the ghola's consciousness and the life memories of the original. Hayt recovers the full memories of the original Duncan Idaho. The Tleilaxu are now able to offer Paul a similar ghola "resurrection" of his deceased beloved Chani to gain leverage over him, but he refuses.

In God Emperor of Dune, over Leto II's 3,500-year reign he has, as constant companions, a series of Duncan gholas with restored memories of the original Idaho but not the memories of the previous gholas. They are perfectly reconstructed incarnations made from a few cells, created as needed in the time span of one to two years. In this novel, one of the Duncans recalls how, as a blank ghola, he was tasked to kill a Face Dancer duplicate of Leto's father and Duncan's friend, Paul, and the psychological stress awakened his memories. Fifteen hundred years later in Heretics of Dune (1984), Leto is dead and the Bene Gesserit are the users of Duncan gholas. The current Idaho ghola recovers the memories of the original like his predecessors; however, the later attempt by the Honored Matre Murbella to sexually imprint him results in his recovery of the memories of all his ghola incarnations. It is later determined that the Tleilaxu had mixed the cells from multiple Idaho gholas to make this one—however, recovery of genetic material from every incarnation would have been impossible for the Tleilaxu, indicating the development of some form of prescient or metaphysical awareness.

Though intense psychological trauma is the key to unlocking the memories of a ghola, the actual situation contrived to accomplish this is specific to each individual. When military genius Miles Teg is killed in Heretics of Dune, a ghola of him is born in Chapterhouse: Dune (1985) on orders from Teg's own daughter, Bene Gesserit leader Darwi Odrade. (Note: Though the replacement Teg is called a ghola, Herbert notes that he is technically a clone because the cells used to create him had been taken from the original just prior to his death, rather than from a corpse.) His former memories are unlocked using sexual imprinting.

The discovery of how to reawaken a ghola has tremendous consequences for the Tleilaxu Masters themselves; they subsequently use the technology of axlotl tanks and memory recovery to grant themselves effective immortality. Every Master is "recreated" upon his death with recovered memories, accumulating many generations of knowledge and experience and permitting planning on a timespan of millennia.

=== Dune games ===
There are also mentions of gholas in the Dune games. In Dune 2000 (1998), the Harkonnen Mentat is allegedly a ghola cloned from Tleilaxu flesh vats, and in Emperor: Battle for Dune (2001), House Ordos constantly deploy their own gholas in assassination and infiltration missions. This is particularly effective in tricking the Sardaukar and Fremen into allying with House Ordos. On a much larger scale, they plan to use a ghola of the now-deceased Corrino Emperor to claim the Golden Lion Throne, with the Executrix as the true leaders behind the so-called "puppet Emperor".

== Heighliner ==
A heighliner is a type of fictional starship used for interstellar travel in the Dune universe created by Frank Herbert. These enormous spaceships are the "major cargo carrier of the Spacing Guild's transportation system".

Duke Leto Atreides speaks of them in Dune (1965):

A Heighliner is truly big. Its hold will tuck all our frigates and transports into a little corner—we'll be just a small part of the ship's manifest.

Heighliner operation requires a Guild Navigator, who uses a limited form of prescience (made possible by their use of the drug melange), to safely guide the ship across space at "translight" speeds. Navigators are confined to giant tanks, completely immersed in highly concentrated orange spice gas. Unable to land, heighliners jump from point to point, parking in planetary orbits, though the ship itself does not technically move. Special laws govern travel aboard a heighliner; heighliners are considered neutral territory and all acts of war aboard heighliners carry stiff penalties. Leto notes that while they are traveling to Arrakis it is quite likely they will share cargo space with Harkonnen vessels, but neither will be aggressive to each other for fear of losing shipping privileges.

It is mentioned in God Emperor of Dune (1981) that while history books credit Aurelius Venport with designing the first Spacing Guild ship, it was actually Venport's mistress, Norma Cenva, who gave him the design. In the Legends of Dune prequel trilogy (2002–2004), Norma invents heighliners during the Butlerian Jihad. The Prelude to Dune prequel trilogy (1999–2001) establishes that in subsequent millennia, the ships are manufactured on the planet Ix. During the events described in the 2001 prequel Dune: House Corrino, a heighliner is expertly spacefolded into a cavern under the surface of Ix, incapacitating an occupying army during the Atreides-led liberation of the planet. In the novel, heighliners are noted to be more than 20 kilometers long.

== Holtzman effect ==
The Holtzman effect is a fictional scientific phenomenon in the Dune universe created by Frank Herbert, beginning with the 1965 novel Dune. The effect is never explained in detail, but it makes (among other things) defensive force shields and instantaneous space travel possible through its application in Holtzman shields, foldspace or Holtzman drives, suspensors, and glowglobes. Herbert defined the Holtzman effect as "the negative repelling effect of a shield generator." Its discovery is explored in the Legends of Dune prequel trilogy by Brian Herbert and Kevin J. Anderson (2002–2004).

=== Holtzman shield ===
In Dune, the Holtzman effect has been adapted to produce personal defensive shields which permit penetration only by objects that move below a pre-set velocity. (Note: Charles L. Harness uses a similar concept in his 1953 novel Flight into Yesterday.) Paul Atreides notes in Dune, "In shield fighting, one moves fast on defense, slow on attack ... The shield turns the fast blow, admits the slow kindjal".

The interaction of a lasgun beam and a Holtzman field results in subatomic fusion and a nuclear explosion. The magnitude of this blast is unpredictable; sometimes it destroys only the shielded target and gunner, sometimes the explosion is more powerful than atomics. Using lasguns in a shielded environment can result in military and environmental catastrophe, though at one point in Dune, Duncan Idaho deliberately allows shield/lasgun contact as a discouragement to his enemies, and in Chapterhouse: Dune, Miles Teg directs the creation of lasgun/Holtzman-field shield drone-mines for use against the Honored Matres. By the time of God Emperor of Dune (1981), God Emperor Leto II has banned shields throughout his empire "to avoid such explosive interactions."

The vibrations of an active shield will drive a sandworm on Arrakis into a killing frenzy, drawing them from across territorial lines to attack the shield. For this reason, the native Fremen eschew them. It is noted in Children of Dune (1976) that the Fremen have developed a small shield generator known as a "pseudo-shield" to attract and madden a worm, for use as an ersatz bomb.

=== Holtzman drive ===
The effect is used in this case to fold space at the quantum level, allowing the Spacing Guild's heighliner ships to instantaneously travel far distances across space without actually moving at all. However, the chaotic and seemingly non-deterministic quantum nature of "foldspace" requires at least limited prescience on the part of the human navigator; otherwise the absurdly complex mathematics involved in producing reliable physical projections of such events would only be possible with advanced computers, which are strictly prohibited because of mankind's crusade against thinking machines, the Butlerian Jihad. To this effect, the Guild produces melange-saturated Navigators who intuitively "see paths through foldspace" in this way. This stumbling block is overcome several thousand years after the events of Dune when Ixian scientists develop mechanical replacements for Guild Navigators.

Kevin R. Grazier analyzes the concepts of folding space and faster-than-light travel in the essay "Cosmic Origami" in The Science of Dune (2007).

=== Suspensors ===
Hovering devices called suspensors utilize the "secondary (low-drain) phase of a Holtzman field generator" to nullify gravity "within certain limits prescribed by relative mass and energy consumption." Suspensors are used in chairs, tables, and structures that are too massive to be physically sound, among other uses. In Dune, the grotesquely obese Baron Vladimir Harkonnen utilizes suspensor belts and harnesses to buoy his flesh and allow him to walk. (Note: In both (1984 and 2021) Dune films and the 2000 miniseries Frank Herbert's Dune, the Baron floats or levitates rather than walk on the ground himself.) In Dune, Jessica theorizes that suspensors, like shields, attract sandworms.

Kevin R. Grazier analyzes the concept of anti-gravity technology in the essay "Suspensor of Disbelief" in The Science of Dune (2007).

=== Glowglobes ===
A varied use of the Holtzman effect is the glowglobe. This device is a small glowing sphere that floats gracefully above a surface like a portable, personal sun, and is typically tuned to a yellowish color. Herbert describes it as a "suspensor-buoyed illuminating device, self-powered (usually by organic batteries)."

== Ixian Probe ==
An Ixian Probe is a fictional device in Frank Herbert's Dune universe used to capture the thoughts of a person (living or dead) for analysis. Ixian Probes are mentioned in Herbert's Heretics of Dune (1984).

As described in Heretics of Dune, the probe is an interrogation device of Ixian manufacture which "can raid the mind even of a dead person". However, the substance shere blocks the effects of the probe, and will protect a person who has taken it even in death. The probe itself or how it works are not described, but when Miles Teg sees a T-Probe for the first time, he believes it is an Ixian Probe. The T-Probe consists of a hood with a series of electrodes attached to the skull, controlled by an operator; the notable difference is that shere has no effect against a T-Probe.

== Lasgun ==
A lasgun (pronounced /ˈleɪzɡʌn/) is a fictional directed-energy weapon, specifically a laser gun, in the Dune universe created by Frank Herbert. In Terminology of the Imperium, the glossary of the 1965 novel Dune, Herbert provides the following definition:

LASGUN: continuous-wave laser projector. Its use as a weapon is limited in a field-generator-shield culture because of the explosive pyrotechnics (technically, subatomic fusion) created when its beam intersects a shield.

The interaction of a lasgun beam and a Holtzman field results in subatomic fusion and a nuclear explosion. The magnitude of this blast is unpredictable; sometimes it destroys only the shielded target and gunner, sometimes the explosion is more powerful than atomics. Using lasguns in a shielded environment can result in military and environmental catastrophe, though at one point in Dune Duncan Idaho deliberately allows shield–lasgun contact as a discouragement to his enemies. In God Emperor of Dune (1981), lasgun fire is described as "blue arcs"; a lasgun is noted to be "heavy" in Chapterhouse: Dune (1985). A cutteray is described in Dune as a "Short-range version of a lasgun used mostly as a cutting tool and surgeon's scalpel".

== No-chamber/No-ship ==
A no-ship, from the cover of Chapterhouse: Dune (1985)

A no-chamber is a fictional stealth technology in the Dune universe created by Frank Herbert. Originally called a no-room in Herbert's God Emperor of Dune (1981), it is a construct that hides anything inside from prescient vision and long-range instruments. A no-globe is a larger construction of no-chambers, and a no-ship is a no-chamber in starship form, with enough limited prescience to be capable of interstellar travel without the use of a Guild Navigator.

=== The original series ===
In God Emperor of Dune, Leto II deduces that the new Ixian Ambassador Hwi Noree had been "born" in what would come to be known as a no-room to shield her creation and upbringing from him. Hwi had been created by the Ixians from the cells of Leto's friend/nemesis Malky but as Malky's direct opposite, using Tleilaxu ghola technology, and designed to be irresistible to Leto. The no-room is an improvement upon a device the Ixians had previously created for Leto to record his thoughts into a written journal and hide them from prescient vision.

In Heretics of Dune (1984), Miles Teg, the Bene Gesserit Lucilla and the Duncan Idaho ghola hide in a no-globe on Gammu, created by the Harkonnens millennia before when the planet had been called Giedi Prime. It is a sizeable complex, noted to be "very ancient but the chambers are still intact and functioning". The exact era of its creation is not specified, but it is written that "Gammu was Giedi Prime, a Harkonnen place ... They were rich ... Rich enough to accomplish the secret installation of a no-room ... even of a large no-globe ... Bribes, third-party purchases, many transshipments ... The Famine Times were very disruptive and before that there were all those millennia of the Tyrant ... When the Harkonnens kept their heads down or lost them."

No-ships are in use at the time of Heretics of Dune; like no-chambers, anything inside a no-ship is hidden from prescient vision and other means of detection, and the ship itself is invisible to sight or photography. However, a no-ship has much greater technological capability than a no-chamber, as it can perform the functions of a Guild Navigator. Specifically, a no-ship's navigation machine is capable of enough limited prescience to successfully navigate its way through foldspace. Teg steals a massive no-ship from the fierce Honored Matres on Gammu in Heretics of Dune, and its Great Hold alone is noted to be one kilometer in length, large enough to transport an adult sandworm. In Chapterhouse: Dune (1985), the Bene Gesserit initially confine Duncan and Murbella to this no-ship on Chapterhouse for their own protection from prescient spying. As Murbella becomes the leader of a New Sisterhood composed of both the Bene Gesserit and Honored Matres, Duncan and Teg flee Chapterhouse with Sheeana and other passengers on the no-ship.

In Heretics of Dune and Chapterhouse Dune it is suggested that certain characters of Atreides ancestry have the ability to use their prescient powers to "see" no-ships. This ability to nullify no-field invisibility is unleashed in Miles Teg after he is interrogated with a device called a T-Probe. Teg's subsequent ghola duplicate also retains that unique ability after his memories are re-awakened.

=== Sequels ===
In Hunters of Dune (2006) and Sandworms of Dune (2007), the novels by Brian Herbert and Kevin J. Anderson which complete Frank Herbert's original series, the fleeing no-ship is named the Ithaca by its passengers in homage to the long journey of the mythological Greek hero Odysseus to his home of Ithaca. Accompanying Duncan, Teg and Sheeana are some 150 refugees, including the (apparent) last Tleilaxu Master Scytale, some Bene Gesserit Sisters, and a group of secret Jews. They seek a new world onto which to introduce the captive sandworms on board, as well as a new home for the Jews, but are in constant pursuit by the Unknown Enemy who seek to ensnare the ship in an inescapable tachyon net. With the help of genetic material possessed by Scytale, the passengers of the Ithaca begin growing gholas of historical heroes such as Paul Atreides and Lady Jessica to assist them in the final battle they know is coming against the Unknown Enemy.

=== Prelude to Dune ===
In the Prelude to Dune prequel trilogy (1999–2001) by Brian Herbert and Kevin J. Anderson, the creation of the Harkonnen no-globe is attributed to a man named Chobyn. He invents the technology and builds the no-globe for Baron Vladimir Harkonnen immediately prior to the events of Dune (1965). However, Chobyn is killed and the technology lost until it is reinvented by the Ixians millennia later during the reign of Leto II.

== Ornithopter ==
An ornithopter (from Greek roots ornithos- "bird" and pteron "wing") is an aircraft that flies by flapping its wings.

In the Dune universe, ornithopters (or 'thopters) are one of the primary modes of transportation on Arrakis. Herbert describes ornithopters as "Aircraft capable of sustained wing-beat flight in the manner of birds" in his 1965 novel Dune. The craft achieve takeoff primarily through the beat of their wings, with jet power assisting in propulsion and stabilization:

Leto fed power to the wings, felt them cup and dip—once, twice. They were airborne in ten meters, wings feathered tightly and afterjets thrusting them upward in a steep, hissing climb.

The wings themselves, consisting of "delicate metal interleavings", are adjustable in length through a "retractor bar" or manually. They are fully extended when the jetpods are used little or not at all:

The Duke kicked on the jet brakes. The ship bucked as its tail pods whispered to silence. Stub wings elongated, cupped the air. The craft became a full 'thopter as the Duke banked it, holding the wings to a gentle beat.

The wings are shortened when more jet thrust is used or the 'thopter uses the "jet-boost" alternative mode of takeoff, and tip to assist in braking.

In the 1984 film adaptation, ornithopters are depicted with small, folding, non-flapping wings. According to the film's designers, propulsion is provided via an antigravity device called an "etherbender", which is shown but never mentioned in the film itself. In the 2000 Sci Fi Channel miniseries Frank Herbert's Dune, the craft have wings that appear to incorporate tiltrotor technology. In the 2021 film adaptation, ornithopters are depicted with four or eight foldable, flapping wings on either side, resembling those of a dragonfly, a design that director Denis Villeneuve had conceived when he read the novel at a young age. Villeneuve's VFX team used actual helicopters as placeholders, which they later replaced with computer-generated ornithopters. Two 12-ton practical ornithopters were built and taken to Budapest and the Jordanian desert for filming. VFX production supervisor Paul Lambert explained, "These machines had a fully hydraulic ramp to open and close, and were lifted by cranes for take off and landing. CG wings were added in post."

== Stillsuit ==
Fremen Chani (Zendaya) and Stilgar (Javier Bardem) wearing stillsuits in Dune (2021)

A stillsuit is a fictional body suit in Frank Herbert's Dune universe, worn by the indigenous Fremen of the desert planet Arrakis to maintain their body moisture in the harsh environment.

=== Description ===
As described in the 1965 novel Dune, a stillsuit is a "body-enclosing garment" of Fremen design which performs the "functions of heat dissipation and filtering bodily wastes" to reclaim moisture. Perspiration, urine, and the water vapor expelled during respiration are captured by the stillsuit and filtered, and reclaimed water accumulates in pockets and is made available for drinking through a tube at the neck. Walking and breathing provide the pumping action to move water through the filtration process and provide the necessary heat exchange. Without a stillsuit, the average person on Arrakis could lose more than 10 liters of water daily through their pores, but the stillsuit reduces that loss to 5 milliliters. Imperial Planetologist Liet-Kynes describes the stillsuit in Dune:

It's basically a micro-sandwich—a high-efficiency filter and heat-exchange system. The skin-contact layer's porous. Perspiration passes through it, having cooled the body ... near-normal evaporation process. The next two layers ... include heat exchange filaments and salt precipitators. Salt's reclaimed. Motions of the body, especially breathing and some osmotic action provide the pumping force. Reclaimed water circulates to catchpockets from which you draw it through this tube in the clip at your neck ... Urine and feces are processed in the thigh pads. In the open desert, you wear this filter across your face, this tube in the nostrils with these plugs to ensure a tight fit. Breathe in through the mouth filter, out through the nose tube. With a Fremen suit in good working order, you won't lose more than a thimbleful of moisture a day".

Due to its scarcity on Arrakis, water and its preservation are sacred to the Fremen.

=== Analysis ===
In his essay "Stillsuit" in The Science of Dune (2007), John C. Smith analyzes Herbert's stillsuit and its feasibility in the real world as described. Smith suggests that "Stillsuits designed using strict literal interpretations from the Dune books probably would not work and most likely would cook the wearer like a Crock-Pot ... However, engineering solutions can be envisioned for all the suit's shortcomings."

== T-Probe ==
A T-Probe is a fictional device in Frank Herbert's Dune universe used to capture the thoughts of a person (living or dead) for analysis. T-Probes appear or are referred to in Herbert's Heretics of Dune (1984) and Chapterhouse: Dune (1985), as well as the sequels Hunters of Dune (2006) and Sandworms of Dune (2007) by Brian Herbert and Kevin J. Anderson.

As described in Heretics of Dune, the probe is a non-Ixian interrogation device brought by the Honored Matres from the Scattering. It is attached to the body through a series of "medusa contacts" placed around the skull and on major nerve centers. An operator can increase or decrease the power supplied to the probe to maximize its efficacy while at the same time not overloading the nervous system of the subject. While being subjected to the probe, Miles Teg's Mentat thinking deduces that not only can it "command his body as though he had no thinking part in his own behavior", but also "The whole spectrum of his senses could be copied into this T-probe and identified ... The machine could trace those out as though it made a duplicate of him." The probe builds a 'digital framework' of the person which can be subjected to stimuli, and will respond as the person would. The T-Probe also causes massive, virtually unendurable pain in a living subject. Shere only prevents the T-Probe from recovering memories directly (as it does for the Ixian Probe) and does not impede any of the other features. Memories can still be guessed at from the model the probe constructs. The T-Probe is what causes Miles Teg's brain to change its structure, giving him the blinding speed and amazing abilities seen at the end of Heretics of Dune. This mental alteration continues in Teg even after being 'reborn' as a Tleilaxu ghola in Chapterhouse Dune.

== Weirding Module ==
Specific to the 1984 Dune film adaptation by David Lynch, a Weirding Module is a fictional sonic weapon. Used by House Atreides and later by Fremen fighters, the device is a sonic beam weapon that translates specific sounds of varying potency into attacks.

In the novel, Paul Atreides and his mother Lady Jessica teach the Fremen the Bene Gesserit martial arts which was called the "weirding way" by the Fremen. An indirect reference to this detail is made in the scene where Jessica physically overpowers Fremen leader Stilgar at their first encounter. Lynch is said to have adapted the weirding way into the Weirding Module because he did not like the idea of "kung-fu on sand dunes". The change literalizes Paul's line "My own name is a killing word". In the novel, the Fremen shout his Fremen name, "Muad'Dib", as a battle cry; in the film, the Fremen are surprised to find that saying "Muad'Dib" is a powerful trigger for the Weirding Module.

The Weirding Module appears in the computer games Dune (1992) and Emperor: Battle for Dune (2001), and the concept is adapted into "sonic tanks" for the games Dune II (1992) and Dune 2000 (1998). There is no reference to this technology in the original novels.

== Other technologies ==
In Dune Messiah, the ghola Hayt is provided by the Tleilaxu with metallic artificial eyes, which they boast "improved on the original." Survivors of atomic stone burner blasts are typically blinded, but the superstitious Fremen in Paul Atreides' armies tend to believe that Tleilaxu eyes "enslave their users", and that a union between metal eyes and human flesh "must be sinful." The Bene Tleilax also produce biological products other than gholas and Face Dancers. Chairdogs are living and partially sentient creatures used for seating which possess the ability to shape themselves to fit their occupant. Some characters dislike sitting on an animal and prefer normal chairs. A slig is a hybrid livestock animal—a cross between a large slug and a Terran pig—first mentioned in Heretics of Dune and considered a culinary delicacy. Despite being the producers of sligs, the Tleilaxu themselves do not consume the animals, having designed them to facilitate what they see as the degrading decadence and spiritual bankruptcy of all cultures but their own.

Herbert's series of Dune novels have numerous other technologically advanced devices. In Dune (1965), water is scarce on the desert planet Arrakis; the native Fremen use a type of air well called a windtrap to condense moisture from the air and collect it in vast catch basins. They also collect moisture from the dead using a device called a deathstill. The Fremen accomplish long-distance coded communication using a distrans, a steganographic device that produces a "temporary neural imprint" on the nervous system of bats or birds. The message imprint is carried within the animal's normal cry, and can later be separated out using another distrans. A palm lock is a lock or seal keyed to a specific human hand, a solido is a projected three-dimensional image, and a poison snooper is a device which can detect poisons by analyzing radiation in the "olfactory spectrum". In Dune, the Baron Vladimir Harkonnen employs a cone of silence, a sound-deadening field used for privacy, though it does not visually obscure lip movement. In Heretics of Dune (1984) Herbert mentions an Ixian damper, a similar, portable device described as a "black disc" which is buoyed midair by suspensors. It hides words from anyone without the proper coded translator, and projects distortions that hide the precise movements of lips and the sounds of voices. A filmbook is a shigawire imprint, used for training and education, which carries a mnemonic pulse that imprints information and corresponding images in the reader's mind.

Herbert mentions other unnamed technologies in the Dune series. In Dune, the Bene Gesserit Reverend Mother Mohiam "tests" young Paul Atreides using a box that inflicts pain through "nerve induction". It is described as "a green metal cube about fifteen centimeters on a side", with one open side revealing a blackness so dark that no light penetrates it. Paul is forced to place his hand into the box and not remove it until Mohiam allows him. He experiences first coldness, tingling, then itching, followed by "the faintest burning" which soon intensifies to the point that "he could feel skin curling black on that agonized hand, the flesh crisping and dropping away until only charred bones remained". The pain stops, and when he is permitted to remove his hand, it is unmarked and unharmed. This device is later referred to as the "agony box" in Heretics of Dune, and is noted to be used for interrogation as well. Carol Hart analyzes the concept of inflicting pain without injury in the essay "The Black Hole of Pain" in The Science of Dune (2007).

In God Emperor of Dune (1981), Moneo Atreides uses a memocorder, a tiny handheld device described as "a dull black Ixian artifact whose existence crowded the proscriptions of the Butlerian Jihad". In the same novel, the Bene Gesserit Reverend Mother Anteac writes a message to be sent to her Sisterhood:

On Anteac's lap lay a small square of inky black about ten millimeters on a side and no more than three millimeters thick. She wrote upon this square with a glittering needle—one word upon another, all of them absorbed into the square. The completed message would be impressed upon the nerve receptors of an acolyte-messenger's eyes, latent there until they could be replayed at the Chapter House.

In Heretics of Dune, Reverend Mother Lucilla recognizes a device called a hypnobong in use on the street, witnessing a passerby lean into a concave basin and then lift his face "with a shudder ... staggering slightly, his eyes glazed". She notes that the device is "outlawed on all of the more civilized worlds".

== See also ==
- Glossary of Dune (franchise)
