= Sandworms of Dune =

2007 novel by Brian Herbert and Kevin J. Anderson

- First edition cover
- Authors: Brian Herbert; Kevin J. Anderson
- Audio read by: Scott Brick
- Cover artist: Stephen Youll
- Language: English
- Series: Dune series
- Genre: Science fiction
- Published: 2007
- Publisher: Tor Books
- Publication place: United States
- Media type: Print (hardcover & paperback)
- Pages: 496
- ISBN: 0-7653-1293-X
- OCLC: 77504538
- Dewey Decimal: 813/.54 22
- LC Class: PS3558.E617 S26 2007
- Preceded by: Hunters of Dune

Sandworms of Dune is a science fiction novel by American writers Brian Herbert and Kevin J. Anderson, the second of two books they wrote to conclude Frank Herbert's original Dune series, and the final book chronologically of the story. It is based on notes left behind by Frank Herbert for Dune 7, his own planned seventh novel in the Dune series. The novel was released on August 7, 2007.

== Plot ==
=== End nears ===
As Sandworms of Dune begins, the passengers of the no-ship Ithaca continue their nearly two-decade search for a new Bene Gesserit homeworld, while Duncan Idaho evades the tachyon net of the old couple Daniel and Marty, now known to be thinking-machine leaders Omnius and Erasmus. Among the inhabitants of the Ithaca are young gholas of Paul Atreides, Lady Jessica, and others.

Back in the Old Empire, Mother Commander Murbella of the New Sisterhood attempts to rally humankind for a last stand against the thinking machines. The new Face Dancers continue to infiltrate the main organizations of the Old Empire at all levels, having also sent their gholas of Paul Atreides (called Paolo) and the Baron Vladimir Harkonnen to the thinking-machine capital, Synchrony.

At the prompting of Face Dancer infiltrators, the Spacing Guild has begun replacing its Navigators with Ixian navigation devices and cutting off the Navigators' supply of melange. Navigator Edrik and his faction have commissioned Waff, the imperfectly awakened ghola rescued by the Guild from the Bene Gesserit attack on Bandalong, to create "advanced" sandworms able to produce the melange they so desperately require. He accomplishes this by altering the DNA of the sandtrout stage and creating an aquatic form of the worms, which are then released into the oceans of Buzzell. Adapting to their new environment, these "seaworms" quickly flourish, producing a highly concentrated form of spice, dubbed "ultraspice".

Meanwhile, Murbella commissions Ix to copy the planet-destroying Honored Matre Obliterator superweapons for use on the fleet of warships she has ordered from the Guild. However, Ix is now secretly controlled by Face Dancer leader Khrone; previously acting as a minion of Omnius, he continues his own plot for Face Dancer domination of the universe.

Omnius's forces have begun striking world after world, releasing an ultra-deadly virus and then pressing on to other inhabited planets. The thinking-machine plague arrives at Chapterhouse and cripples the Sisterhood, but the few survivors rally unified humankind into one last great stand.

Aboard the Ithaca, Sheeana restarts the ghola project. Gholas of Serena Butler, Gurney Halleck, and Xavier Harkonnen are about to be born when the axlotl tanks are poisoned, killing all three ghola babies and the tanks. Saboteurs are suspected, as many of the ship's systems have also been failing. Scytale, the last Tleilaxu Master, finally reawakens his own ghola's past memories, but only by dying in front of his younger self.

The gholas of Wellington Yueh, Stilgar, and Liet-Kynes regain their memories through various traumatic experiences. Desperate to replenish their supplies, the Ithaca lands on the planet Qelso, a world slowly being terraformed into a desert planet by the introduction of sandworms years before by the Bene Gesserit. Stilgar and Liet-Kynes decide to remain behind to help the skeptical natives slow the encroaching desert and prepare them for the inevitable.

=== Climax ===
Having successfully completed his attempts to create a new incarnation of sandworm, Waff begs Edrik to return him to the ruined planet of Rakis so that he can spend his little remaining time to live attempting to reintroduce the worms there. Unsuccessful, Waff resigns himself to failure and prepares to die; as the last of his sandworm specimens perishes, many sandworms erupt from beneath the surface. Waff realizes that the pearl of Leto II's awareness that each sandworm carries had foreseen the Honored Matre attack on Rakis and caused them to have buried themselves deep beneath the planet's surface. Knowing the planet has begun healing itself, Waff is consumed by a worm, rejoicing that his prophet has finally returned. Meanwhile, Edrik and the ultraspice are intercepted by Khrone, who seizes the spice and kills the Navigator.

The saboteurs are eventually revealed to be the gholas of the Rabbi and Thufir Hawat, who had been murdered and replaced with Face Dancers back on the planet of the Handlers during the events of Hunters of Dune. In the ensuing chaos, the Rabbi ghola (who had also fooled Yueh into killing a Leto I ghola fetus, thinking it was Piter de Vries), before a tiny Alia ghola kills him, ensnares the Ithaca in the tachyon net. Miles Teg sacrifices his life in an unsuccessful attempt to prevent the ship's capture. The Ithaca is brought to Synchrony. They are met by a party led by the ghola of Vladimir Harkonnen. Seeing Alia when he arrives, he immediately kills her: the original Alia had murdered his original self 5,000 years before. The Bene Gesserit gholas of Paul, Lady Jessica, Chani, and Yueh are then taken to see Omnius and Erasmus.

Omnius explains that to complete his domination of humanity, he requires the superior Kwisatz Haderach of the two Paul gholas. Paolo and Paul are forced to duel, during which Paul is seemingly mortally wounded. Victorious, the vicious Paolo consumes the ultraspice; overwhelmed by the rapid onset of perfect prescient vision, he slips into a coma. Paul, at the urging and efforts of Yueh, Chani, and Jessica, slowly regains his past memories and is able to repair the damage to his body using Bene Gesserit physiological control. Under the guise of aiding Paolo, Yueh takes his revenge by killing Vladimir Harkonnen, who had orchestrated the torture and death of Yueh's wife Wanna in their original incarnations.

As this is happening, Murbella has all the new ships in place and launches her fleet against Omnius's oncoming armada. But the Obliterators and Ixian navigation devices all suddenly fail. Murbella realizes that they have been sabotaged. When it appears that defeat at the hands of the thinking-machine forces is imminent, the Oracle of Time, Norma Cenva, appears with a thousand ships piloted by Guild Navigators and attacks the machines, leaving their fleet in pieces. The Oracle then tells Murbella that she is going to Synchrony to stop Omnius once and for all; she folds space, and a visual manifestation of the Oracle appears in the room where Paul and Paolo have been dueling. The Oracle then removes every aspect of Omnius and transports the Evermind away into another dimension forever.

=== Ultimate Kwisatz Haderach ===
Sheeana and the young Leto II ghola free the sandworms from the Ithaca's cargo hold, and the worms wreak havoc throughout Synchrony. Leto II regains his memories, and after the battle is finished, he tells Sheeana that he must now go back into the dreaming. Leto walks into the belly of the largest worm, Monarch, and the seven worms twist together and join into one giant superworm before digging deep into the ground.

Fresh from fighting the thinking machines outside on Synchrony with Sheeana, Duncan enters the chamber where a recovering Paul, his memories now restored, reveals that Duncan is the final Kwisatz Haderach, having evolved and perfected himself through thousands of years of ghola rebirth and altered DNA. Erasmus, the independent-minded robot, explains that he, not Omnius, was the mastermind behind the rebuilding of the Synchronized Worlds.

A mutinous Khrone declares that the universe now belongs to his Face Dancers, as both humans and machines have been crippled. Amused by Khrone's attempt to seize power, Erasmus explains that a fail-safe system had been built into the Face Dancers. Erasmus kills Khrone and his party—and then all enhanced Face Dancers across the universe—with the simple flip of a mental switch. The immediate death of so many Face Dancers exposes how much they had infiltrated human society.

Erasmus then offers Duncan a choice. With humans battered and thinking machines beaten in Kralizec, the great prophesied battle, Duncan can choose either destruction for one side or recovery and healing for both. Choosing peace over victory, Duncan then merges minds with Erasmus. Erasmus imparts to Duncan all the codes required to run the Synchronized Worlds, as well as all of his knowledge. Duncan now stands as the bridge between humans and machines.

With little left for himself, Erasmus again expresses his desire to learn everything possible about what it is to be human—he asks for Duncan to help him die. As Duncan shuts down Erasmus, now in the form of Marty, he shares with the robot many of the deaths he experienced. A version of Erasmus continues in Duncan's mind.

Back in the Old Empire, Murbella's forces are preparing to attack Omnius's second wave when the machines suddenly stop. With the Oracle having taken Omnius, a Navigator brings Murbella to Synchrony. She and Duncan are reunited, and he meets his daughter Supreme Bashar Janess Idaho; he explains his intent to end the divide between humans and thinking machines—the two will co-exist. Duncan gives Synchrony to Sheeana for her Orthodox Sisterhood, while he returns to Chapterhouse with Murbella to help lead the new human-machine mode of life.

=== Epilogue ===
On Qelso, the gholas of Stilgar and Liet-Kynes continue to help hold back the expanding desert, while simultaneously teaching the planet's occupants how to adapt to the inevitable changes. Under the control of Duncan and his daughter Janess, a thinking-machine convoy lands on the planet; Duncan offers the gholas the machines' aid in holding back the desert. He tells Stilgar and Kynes that just as he has become both man and machine, Qelso will become both desert and forest.

On Caladan, the gholas of Lady Jessica and Yueh have returned to the ancient Atreides castle. Having removed all traces of the Baron's occupancy, the two discuss how they will go forward with their lives. Accompanying them is the unawakened ten-year-old ghola of Leto I. Looking forward to the time when his memories will be restored, Lady Jessica finds solace in the fact that she will be reunited with her Duke.

With the aid of the Tleilaxu Master Scytale, Sheeana and the Orthodox Sisterhood on Synchrony have reestablished the ancient Bene Gesserit breeding program, resolving to never again breed another Kwisatz Haderach. At her side, Sheeana has a young ghola of Serena Butler, heroine of the Butlerian Jihad. Along with gholas of the Tleilaxu Masters, Scytale has grown Tleilaxu females from newly discovered cells, vowing that they will never again be forced into becoming axlotl tanks, in the hopes that this will prevent the creation of a vengeful enemy such as the Honored Matres from ever occurring again, and also vowing to never again allow the Masters to corrupt the recovering Tleilaxu people.

On the recovering planet Dune, the awakened gholas of Paul and now-pregnant Chani go about restoring the planet to its former glory. Now that Paul is able to devote all of his attention to her, Chani remarks that he has finally learned how to treat his wife. Paul reaffirms his love for Chani, telling her he has loved her for over 5,000 years.

== Critical reception ==
The novel was commercially successful, and praised by Jackie Cassada of the Library Journal:

Complex in structure though never hard to follow, this sequel to Hunters of Dune ties together the threads left by Chapterhouse: Dune, bringing closure to a saga of planetary birth and death and human courage and hubris. At the same time, the authors have left room for further explorations of one of the genre's most enduring worlds. Highly recommended for all SF collections.

Conversely, the novel was criticized by Publishers Weekly for its writing and storytelling methods:

Longtime collaborators Herbert and Anderson set themselves a steep challenge—and, in the end, fail to meet it—in this much anticipated wrapup of the original Dune cycle (after 2006's Hunters of Dune) [...] Though pacing is brisk and the infrequent action scenes crackle with tension, only two minor characters—gholas, who are young clones with restored memories, of Suk doctor Wellington Yueh and God-Emperor Leto II—acquire real depth. Everyone else is too busy reacting to mostly irrelevant subplots like sabotage aboard the no-ship Ithaca, a plague devastating the planet of Chapterhouse and the genetic engineering of marine-dwelling sandworms. The lengthy climax relies on at least four consecutive deus ex machina bailouts... Series fans will argue the novel's merits for years; others will be underwhelmed.

== Previous use ==
Sandworms of Dune was originally the working title for the fourth Dune novel, which was eventually published as God Emperor of Dune. Sandworms of Dune is the name of a 1978 recording comprising readings by Frank Herbert of passages of the first three Dune novels involving Sandworms.
