= Heretics of Dune =

1984 novel by Frank Herbert

- First edition cover
- Author: Frank Herbert
- Audio read by: Simon Vance
- Cover artist: Abe Echevarria
- Language: English
- Series: Dune series
- Genre: Science fiction
- Published: 1984
- Publisher: Putnam
- Publication place: United States
- Media type: Print (hardcover & paperback)
- Pages: 480
- ISBN: 0-399-12898-0
- OCLC: 77462821
- Dewey Decimal: 813/.54 19
- LC Class: PS3558.E63 H4 1984
- Preceded by: God Emperor of Dune
- Followed by: Chapterhouse: Dune

Heretics of Dune is a 1984 science fiction novel by Frank Herbert, the fifth in his Dune series of six novels.

Set 1,500 years after the events of God Emperor of Dune (1981), the novel finds humanity on the path set for them by the tyrant Leto II Atreides to guarantee their survival. But a new threat arrives in the form of the Honored Matres, a brutal matriarchy from beyond the known universe whose only goals are conquest and destruction.

Heretics of Dune was ranked as the No. 13 hardcover fiction best seller of 1984 by The New York Times.

== Plot summary ==
Fifteen hundred years after the 3,500-year reign of the God Emperor Leto II Atreides ended with his assassination, humanity is firmly on the Golden Path, Leto's plan to save humanity from destruction. By crushing the aspirations of humans for over three thousand years and dismantling the complex economic system dependent on the spice melange, Leto caused the Scattering, an explosion of humanity into the rest of the universe upon his death.

Sandworms have reappeared on Arrakis (now called Rakis), and have renewed the flow of the all-important spice to the galaxy. A new civilization has risen, with three dominant powers: the Ixians, whose no-ships are capable of piloting between the stars and are invisible to outside detection; the Bene Tleilax, who have learned to manufacture spice in their axlotl tanks and have created a new breed of Face Dancers; and the Bene Gesserit, a matriarchal order of subtle political manipulators who possess superhuman abilities. However, people from the Scattering are returning with their own peculiar powers. The most powerful of these forces are the Honored Matres, a violent society of women bred and trained for combat and the sexual control of men.

The Bene Gesserit leader, Mother Superior Taraza, brings Mentat and former Supreme Bashar Miles Teg out of retirement to oversee the protection of their latest Tleilaxu-provided Duncan Idaho ghola on the planet Gammu, the former Giedi Prime. She also sends Bene Gesserit Imprinter Lucilla to instruct Duncan, and eventually bind his loyalty to the Sisterhood with her sexual talents. At the same time, Teg's biological daughter, Reverend Mother Darwi Odrade, is put in command of the Bene Gesserit keep on Rakis. The Bene Gesserit discover Sheeana, an orphan girl who can control the giant sandworms, and hope to gain control of her and the religion that will inevitably form around her. Soon the Bene Gesserit thwart an attack on Sheeana, and Odrade begins training her in the ways of the Sisterhood. The two discover a huge hoard of spice that Leto left, along with a message from Leto, saying the Bene Gesserit should find noble purpose.

When an assassination attempt is made on Duncan, Lucilla and Teg flee with him into the countryside, finding refuge in an old Harkonnen no-globe. Teg awakens Duncan's original memories, but does so before Lucilla can imprint Duncan and thus tie him to the Sisterhood. Teg is captured by the Honored Matres while Lucilla and Duncan escape. Teg is tortured by a T-Probe, but under pressure discovers new abilities: drastically increased physical capabilities and an uncertain type of prescience, which he uses to escape easily and capture a no-ship with some of his old battle comrades. Duncan is subdued by a young Honored Matre named Murbella, who attempts to enslave him sexually. However, hidden Tleilaxu conditioning kicks in, and Duncan responds with an equal technique that overwhelms Murbella. The experience restores in him the entire memories of all of the hundreds of previous Duncan gholas.

Taraza meets with the Tleilaxu Master Waff and compels him to tell her what he knows about the Honored Matres. He also reveals that the Bene Tleilax have conditioned their own agenda into Duncan. Taraza gleans the Tleilaxu's secret religious beliefs from their conversation, and uses them to manipulate an alliance with the Bene Tleilax that better serves the Bene Gesserit. Odrade realizes that Taraza's plan is to destroy Rakis (which will help destroy Leto's tyrannical grip on history) just as the Honored Matres invade, killing Taraza and Waff. Odrade becomes Mother Superior of the Bene Gesserit and escapes with Sheeana into the desert on a worm.

Teg finds that his prescient powers allow him to "see" shielded no-ships, enabling him to locate Duncan and Lucilla. They flee to Rakis with a captive, pregnant Murbella, intercepting Odrade and Sheeana and their giant worm. Teg leads his troops in a suicidal defense of Rakis designed to enrage the Honored Matres and goad them into destroying the planet and its worms, which had been Taraza's intent. The Honored Matres do so, incinerating Rakis' surface and killing all sandworms, save the one with which Odrade and Sheeana have escaped. They intend to use it to create a new sandworm ecosystem on the secret Bene Gesserit planet Chapterhouse.

== Publication history ==
Frank Herbert wrote much of the initial draft of Heretics of Dune in Hawaii, using a Compaq word processor. According to his son Brian, Herbert's time spent writing the draft would be "exceedingly arduous and much slower for him [Herbert] than usual, because of all the time he had to spend out of his study tending to the medical crises of my mother, Beverly Herbert."

== Reception ==
Kirkus Reviews described this fifth installment of the Dune series as "another uneven entry, slow to start and hastily, rather abruptly concluded—but more exciting and adventurous than any since the original Dune, with a gratifying influx of new ideas."

Heretics of Dune was ranked as the No. 13 hardcover fiction best seller of 1984 by The New York Times.
