= Hunters of Dune =

2006 novel by Brian Herbert and Kevin J. Anderson

- First edition cover
- Authors: Brian Herbert; Kevin J. Anderson
- Audio read by: Scott Brick
- Cover artist: Stephen Youll
- Language: English
- Series: Dune series
- Genre: Science fiction
- Published: 2006
- Publisher: Tor Books
- Publication place: United States
- Media type: Print (hardcover & paperback)
- Pages: 528
- ISBN: 0-7653-1292-1
- OCLC: 65538555
- Dewey Decimal: 813.54
- LC Class: PS3558.E617 H86 2006
- Preceded by: Chapterhouse: Dune
- Followed by: Sandworms of Dune

Hunters of Dune is the first of two books written by Brian Herbert and Kevin J. Anderson to conclude Frank Herbert's original Dune series of science fiction novels.

The cliffhanger ending of Frank Herbert's Chapterhouse: Dune (1985) and his subsequent death in 1986 left some overarching plotlines unresolved. Released on August 22, 2006, Hunters continues the story of the danger posed to humanity by a remote, unnamed, but ever-present "great enemy". The novel is based on notes left behind by Frank Herbert, but Hunters and its 2007 sequel Sandworms of Dune represent the authors' version of what Frank Herbert referred to as Dune 7, his own planned seventh novel in the Dune series.

The first five chapters of the novel were available prior to the novel's publication via free download from the official Dune website, released monthly from March until July in 2006.

== Plot ==
For three years, the no-ship Ithaca has been in an alternate universe, hiding from the "great Enemy". It carries the clones, or gholas, of Duncan Idaho and military commander Miles Teg, as well as the Bene Gesserit Sheeana, the last Bene Tleilax Master Scytale, a group of Jews, other humans, four Futar man-beasts, and seven small melange-producing sandworms. Scytale has shared the secret of producing melange, also called "spice", in axlotl tanks, because the sandworms do not produce enough to allow the ship to continue traveling. The mysterious Oracle of Time speaks to Duncan and brings the no-ship back into the "regular" universe. The ship is discovered by the mysterious beings Daniel and Marty, who attempt to capture it using a tachyon net, but the Ithaca escapes.

On Chapterhouse, the only remaining planet which can produce spice, Murbella has now become the leader of a New Sisterhood, which emerged from the combination of the Honored Matres and the Bene Gesserit. Despite her best efforts to seamlessly merge the two groups together and prevent a civil war, there are many episodes of violence that erupt between them. Bene Gesserit Bellonda and Honored Matre Doria fight, and Bellonda dies from their intense battle. Desperate for more spice so that their Navigators can travel through space, the Spacing Guild approaches Murbella, but she threatens to completely cut off their already insufficient spice supply if they do not cooperate with the New Sisterhood to eliminate the remaining rebel remnants of Honored Matres and the Enemy. Known only to the Bene Gesserit, the Chapterhouse sandworms produce little melange; the Bene Gesserit make up the shortfall with their own stockpiles.

Though Honored Matres destroyed nearly all Bene Tleilax worlds, some descendants of the Tleilaxu who went off into the Scattering, called the Lost Tleilaxu, have returned. They use the shape-shifting Face Dancers for espionage, until the Face Dancers kill Tleilaxu Elder Burah and replace him with a duplicate. It is revealed that they have replaced all Lost Tleilaxu Elders, as well as countless humans on various Old Empire planets. The Face Dancer leader, Khrone, sends Tleilaxu scribe Uxtal to serve rebel Honored Matre leader Hellica, who proclaimed herself Matre Superior and now rules the conquered Bene Tleilax homeworld, Tleilax.

The desperate Spacing Guild goes to Ix seeking an alternative means of space travel. Khrone and his Face Dancers have secretly infiltrated Ix, plotting to dominate the universe. Working with Daniel and Marty, Khrone offers their advanced navigation technology to the Guild as if it were Ixian-designed. The Guild agrees to develop this technology if they have a monopoly on it.

Uxtal is forced to use Tleilaxu axlotl tank technology to produce the adrenaline-enhancing drug Honored Matres use. Khrone tasks Uxtal to make a ghola of Baron Vladimir Harkonnen, as sociopathic as the original. Khrone obtains the blood of Paul Atreides and has Uxtal make a ghola of Paul; he intends to use the Baron's ghola to twist Paul's ghola into a weapon for Daniel and Marty's conquest of the universe. Later, Guild Navigator Edrik comes to Tleilax seeking Uxtal's knowledge of axlotl tanks; the Navigator fears his kind's obsolescence when Ixian navigation technology becomes available. He seeks an axlotl tank-based source of spice to break the Bene Gesserit monopoly, but everyone believes that technology died with the Tleilaxu Masters. Eventually, Uxtal accesses the genetic material of deceased Master Tylwyth Waff and creates several Waff gholas, hoping to recover the knowledge to recreate that lost technology.

The Tleilaxu sustain their lives indefinitely using gholas; Scytale's current body is dying, and he lacks a replacement. He has a secret to use as a bargaining tool: a hidden nullentropy capsule containing cells of numerous important historical figures secretly collected by Tleilaxu for millennia, as far back as the Butlerian Jihad. The Bene Gesserit viciously debate over whether to create gholas of any of them. A few at a time, the historical gholas are created—Leto II Atreides, Lady Jessica, Paul Atreides, Chani, planetologist Liet-Kynes, Mentat Thufir Hawat, and Stilgar—and Scytale is given a ghola of himself to train as his replacement.

On Chapterhouse, Murbella creates the Valkyries, an elite New Sisterhood strike force. They successfully attack rebel Honored Matre strongholds on other planets, discovering that some Matres are disguised Face Dancers. Murbella accesses Other Memory from her Matre ancestors and learns their true origins: they were vengeful Tleilaxu females, freed and assimilated by Fish Speakers and Bene Gesserit fleeing into the Scattering. Tleilaxu females had been enslaved for use as axlotl tanks by Tleilaxu males for millennia. These origins were forgotten; Murbella now understands why Honored Matres annihilated Tleilaxu worlds in the Old Empire.

On the no-ship, rebel Bene Gesserit attempt to murder the Leto II ghola, but are foiled when he transforms into a sandworm. Sheeana has visions that suggest the use of the gholas is dangerous, and halts the program until she knows more. The Paul ghola, helped by the Chani ghola, steals and consumes an overdose of spice in an attempt to remember his past, but instead has a vision of being stabbed by an evil version of himself. After the Bene Gesserit discover him, he concludes he has regained prescience.

Daniel and Marty tell Khrone to discard the Baron and Paul gholas, as they have lured the Ithaca into a trap, and expect soon to capture the Paul ghola. Working to his own ends, Khrone continues to prepare the gholas, restoring the Baron's memories—including the taunting inner voice of Alia Atreides—and instructing the Baron to train the Paul ghola, who is renamed as Paolo, in preparation for restoring his memories.

Murbella contracts Ix's competitor Richese to provide armaments to fight the great Enemy, but rebel Honored Matres destroy the planet to cripple the Sisterhood. Murbella and her Valkyries—including her daughter, Janess—successfully assault Tleilax, the most powerful rebel Matre stronghold, and discover that many, including Matre Superior Hellica, were Face Dancers. Uxtal, after suffering forced sexual imprinting by ugly crone Matre Ingva, dies trying to escape, eaten by sligs. The only surviving Waff ghola finds refuge with the Spacing Guild, offering Edrik genetic knowledge for the Guild to create their own sandworms.

The Ithaca stumbles upon the homeworld of the Futars' Handlers. An exploratory party discovers that the "Handlers" are actually Face Dancers, and barely escape back to the ship, aided by the self-sacrifice of Hrrm the Futar. Some Face Dancer ships crash into the Ithaca, and the chaos makes it impossible to know if Face Dancers replaced any passengers. The emergency forces Teg to reveal his hidden power of superhuman speed. Duncan, who considers making a Murbella ghola, is cured of his Murbella obsession by mutual imprinting with Sheanna.

Murbella, now in complete control of Honored Matres and Bene Gesserit, prepares a defense against the great Enemy, now identified by Other Memory to be thinking machines of Omnius, the machine overlord destroyed in the ancient Butlerian Jihad. The Oracle of Time is revealed to be the living consciousness of Norma Cenva, somehow also still in existence millennia after the Jihad.

Daniel and Marty are revealed to be Omnius and the independent robot, Erasmus, respectively. Before its destruction, the Omnius incarnation on Giedi Prime had launched thousands of probes capable of constructing new machine colonies on any planets encountered. One probe eventually intercepted a signal transmitted by the last remaining Omnius on Corrin before it too was destroyed. Its forces and Synchronized Empire finally reassembled, the new version of the Evermind is on the way back to the Old Empire to destroy all humanity.

== Reception ==
The New York Times said of Hunters of Dune that "Brian Herbert and Kevin J. Anderson go through the motions, but they don't often seem to be having much fun with their material ... by the end of Hunters, they have done little more than set the table for Sandworms of Dune."
