= Chapterhouse: Dune =

1985 novel by Frank Herbert

- US first edition cover
- Author: Frank Herbert
- Audio read by: Scott Brick; Katherine Kellgren; Euan Morton; Simon Vance
- Cover artist: John Schoenherr
- Language: English
- Series: Dune series
- Genre: Science fiction
- Published: April 1985
- Publisher: Putnam
- Publication place: United States
- Media type: Print (hardcover & paperback)
- Pages: 464
- ISBN: 0-399-13027-6 (hardcover); 0-425-09214-3 (paperback)
- OCLC: 780493996
- Dewey Decimal: 813/.54
- LC Class: PS3558.E63 C48 1985
- Preceded by: Heretics of Dune
- Followed by: Hunters of Dune

Chapterhouse: Dune is a 1985 science fiction novel by Frank Herbert, the last in his Dune series of six novels. It rose to No. 2 on The New York Times Best Seller list.

A direct follow-up to Heretics of Dune, the novel chronicles the continued struggles of the Bene Gesserit sisterhood against the violent Honored Matres, who are succeeding in their bid to seize control of the universe and destroy the factions and planets that oppose them.

Chapterhouse: Dune ends with a cliffhanger, and Herbert's subsequent death in 1986 left some overarching plotlines of the series unresolved. Two decades later, Herbert's son Brian Herbert, along with Kevin J. Anderson, published two sequels – Hunters of Dune (2006) and Sandworms of Dune (2007) – based in part on notes left behind by Frank Herbert for what he referred to as Dune 7, his own planned seventh novel in the Dune series.

== Plot ==
The Bene Gesserit find themselves the target of the Honored Matres, whose conquest of the Old Empire is almost complete. The Matres are seeking to exterminate the Sisterhood for daring to oppose them. Now in command of the Bene Gesserit, Mother Superior Darwi Odrade continues to develop her drastic, secret plan to overcome the Honored Matres. The Bene Gesserit are also terraforming the planet Chapterhouse to accommodate the all-important sandworms, as the planet Dune had been destroyed by the Matres.

Sheeana, in charge of the project, expects sandworms to appear soon. The Honored Matres have also destroyed the entire Bene Tleilax civilization, with Tleilaxu Master Scytale the only one of his kind left alive. In Bene Gesserit captivity, Scytale possesses the Tleilaxu secret of ghola production, which he has reluctantly traded for the Sisterhood's protection. The first ghola produced is that of their recently deceased military genius, Miles Teg. The Bene Gesserit have two other prisoners on Chapterhouse: the latest Duncan Idaho ghola, and his lover, former Honored Matre Murbella, whom they have accepted as a novice despite their suspicion that she intends to escape back to the Honored Matres.

Lampadas, a center for Bene Gesserit education, is destroyed by the Honored Matres. The planet's Chancellor, Reverend Mother Lucilla, manages to escape carrying the shared-minds of millions of Reverend Mothers. Lucilla is forced to land on Gammu where she seeks refuge with an underground group of Jews, known as "Secret Israel". The Rabbi gives Lucilla sanctuary, but to save his people from the Matres he must deliver her to them. Before doing so, he reveals Rebecca, a "wild" Reverend Mother who has gained her Other Memory without Bene Gesserit training.

Lucilla shares minds with Rebecca, who promises to take the memories of Lampadas safely back to the Sisterhood. Lucilla is then "betrayed", and taken before the Great Honored Matre Dama, who tries to persuade her to join the Honored Matres, preserving her life in exchange for Bene Gesserit secrets. The Honored Matres are particularly interested in learning to voluntarily modify their body chemistry, a skill they no longer have, despite the fact that they are descendants of Bene Gesserit and Fish Speakers who went out into the Scattering, and evolved into the Honored Matres. From this, Lucilla deduces that the greater enemy that the Matres are fleeing from is making extensive use of biological warfare. Lucilla refuses to share this knowledge with the Matres, and Dama ultimately kills her.

Back on Chapterhouse, Odrade confronts Duncan and forces him to admit that he is a Mentat, proving that he retains the memories of his many ghola lives. Meanwhile, Murbella collapses under the pressure of Bene Gesserit training, and realizes that she wants to be Bene Gesserit. Odrade believes that the Sisterhood made a mistake in fearing emotion, and that in order to evolve, they must learn to accept emotions. Murbella survives the spice agony and becomes a Reverend Mother. Odrade confronts Sheeana, discovering that Duncan and Sheeana have been allies for some time. Sheeana does not reveal that they have been considering the option of reawakening Teg's memory through imprinting, nor does Odrade discover that Sheeana has the keys to Duncan's no-ship prison.

Teg is awakened by Sheeana using imprinting techniques. Odrade appoints him again as Bashar of the military forces of the Sisterhood for the assault on the Honored Matres. Odrade announces to the Bene Gesserit that Teg will lead an attack against the Honored Matres. She also makes clear her intention to share her memories with Murbella and Sheeana, making them candidates to succeed her as Mother Superior if she dies. Odrade meets with the Great Honored Matre while the Bene Gesserit forces under Teg attack Gammu, and then Junction, with tremendous force. Teg uses his secret ability to see no-ships to secure control of the system, and victory for the Bene Gesserit seems inevitable. In the midst of this battle, Rebecca and the Jews take refuge with the Bene Gesserit fleet.

Dama's chief advisor Logno assassinates Dama with poison and assumes control of the Honored Matres. Too late, Odrade and Teg realize they have fallen into a trap, and the Honored Matres use a mysterious weapon, which kills without wounding, to turn defeat into victory, and capture Odrade. Murbella saves as much of the Bene Gesserit force as she can by sending them to Chapterhouse. Odrade, however, had planned for the possible failure of the Bene Gesserit attack and left Murbella instructions for a last desperate gamble. Murbella pilots a small craft down to the surface, announcing herself as an Honored Matre who, in the confusion, has managed to escape the Bene Gesserit with all their secrets. She arrives on the planet and is taken to the Great Honored Matre, and taunts her. Unable to control her anger, Logno attacks but is killed by Murbella.

Awed by her physical prowess, the remaining Honored Matres are forced to accept her as their new leader. Odrade is also killed in the melee and Murbella shares with Odrade to absorb her newest memories, as they had already shared prior to the battle. Murbella's ascension to leadership, and her bringing the Honored Matres to merge with the Bene Gesserit, is not accepted as victory by all the latter. Some flee Chapterhouse, notably Sheeana, who has a vision of her own, and arranges to have some of the new worms that have emerged in the Chapterhouse desert brought aboard the no-ship. Sheeana is joined by Duncan. The two escape in the giant no-ship, with Scytale, Teg and the Jews. Murbella recognizes their plan at the last minute, but is powerless to stop them. Two mysterious entities resembling an old married couple, Daniel and Marty, whom Duncan had seen in visions, wryly note the refugees' escape.

== Reception ==
Chapterhouse: Dune debuted at No. 5 and rose to No. 2 on The New York Times Best Seller list. Gerald Jonas of The New York Times noted that "Against all odds, the universe of Dune keeps getting richer in texture, more challenging in its moral dilemmas."

Dave Langford reviewed the novel for White Dwarf #65, and stated that "The hyper-acute characters are impressive, the resolution thoughtful and humane. Though initially I gave up after Children, Heretics and Chapter House have partially Restored My Faith."

== Sequels ==
Two decades after Frank Herbert's death, his son Brian Herbert, along with Kevin J. Anderson, published two sequels – Hunters of Dune (2006) and Sandworms of Dune (2007) – based on notes left behind by Frank Herbert for what he referred to as Dune 7, his own planned seventh novel in the Dune series, while also continuing plot-lines from Brian Herbert's and Kevin J. Anderson's own Dune prequel novels.
