= Children of Dune =

1976 novel by Frank Herbert

- US first edition cover
- Author: Frank Herbert
- Audio read by: Scott Brick; Simon Vance
- Cover artist: Vincent Di Fate
- Language: English
- Series: Dune series
- Genre: Science fiction
- Published: April 1976
- Publisher: Putnam
- Publication place: United States
- Media type: Print (hardcover & paperback)
- Pages: 444
- ISBN: 0-399-11697-4
- OCLC: 1975222
- Dewey Decimal: 813/.5/4
- LC Class: PZ4.H5356 Ch3 PS3558.E63
- Preceded by: Dune Messiah
- Followed by: God Emperor of Dune

Children of Dune is a 1976 science fiction novel by Frank Herbert, the third in his Dune series of six novels. Originally serialized in Analog Science Fiction and Fact in 1976, it was the last Dune novel to be serialized before book publication.

At the end of Dune Messiah, Paul Atreides walks into the desert, a blind man, leaving his sister Alia to rule the universe as regent for his twin children, Leto II and Ghanima. Awakened in the womb by the spice, the children are the heirs to Paul's prescient vision of the fate of the universe, a role that Alia desperately craves. House Corrino schemes to return to the throne, while the Bene Gesserit make common cause with the Tleilaxu and Spacing Guild to gain control of the spice and Paul's children.

Initially selling over 75,000 copies, it became the first hardcover best-seller in science fiction. The novel was critically well-received for its plot, action, and atmosphere and was nominated for the Hugo Award for Best Novel in 1977. Dune Messiah (1969) and Children of Dune were collectively adapted by the Sci-Fi Channel in 2003 into a miniseries titled Frank Herbert's Children of Dune.

== Plot ==
Nine years after Emperor Paul "Muad'Dib" Atreides walked into the desert, the ecological transformation of Dune has reached the point where some Fremen are living without stillsuits in the less arid climate and have started to move out of the sietches and into villages and cities. As the old ways erode, more and more pilgrims arrive to experience the planet of Muad'Dib. The imperial high council has lost its political might and is powerless to control the jihad.

Paul's young twin children, Leto II and Ghanima, have concluded that their aunt and guardian Alia has succumbed to Abomination—possession by her grandfather Baron Vladimir Harkonnen—and fear that a similar fate awaits them. They (and Alia) also realize that the terraforming of Dune will kill all the sandworms, thus destroying the source of the spice, but the Baron desires this outcome. Leto also fears that, like his father, he will become trapped by his prescience.

Meanwhile, a new religious figure called "The Preacher" has risen in the desert, rallying against the religious government's injustices and the changes among the Fremen. Some Fremen believe he is Paul Atreides. Princess Wensicia of the fallen House Corrino on Salusa Secundus plots to assassinate the twins and regain power for her House.

Lady Jessica returns to Arrakis and recognizes that her daughter is possessed, but finds no signs of Abomination in the twins. Leto arranges for Fremen leader Stilgar to protect Ghanima if there is an attempt on their lives. The Preacher journeys to Salusa Secundus to meet Wensicia's son Farad'n, and in return pledges the Duncan Idaho ghola as an agent of House Corrino. Alia attempts to assassinate Jessica, who escapes into the desert with Duncan's help, precipitating a rebellion among the Fremen. The twins anticipate and survive the Corrino assassination plot, faking Leto's death.

Leto leaves to seek out Jacurutu, a mythical Fremen sietch and possible holdout of the Preacher, while Ghanima, changing her memory with self-hypnosis, reports (and believes) that her brother has been murdered. Duncan and Jessica flee to Salusa Secundus, where Jessica begins to mentor Farad'n in the ways of the Bene Gesserit. He sidelines and publicly denounces his regent mother Wensicia over the assassination attempt, and allies with the Bene Gesserit, who promise to marry him to Ghanima and support his bid to become Emperor.

A band of Fremen outlaws capture Leto and force him to undergo the spice trance at the suggestion of Gurney Halleck, who has infiltrated the group on Jessica's orders. Leto's spice-induced visions show him myriad possible futures where humanity becomes extinct and only one where it survives. He names this future the "Golden Path" and resolves to bring it to fruition—something that his father, who had already glimpsed this future, refused to do. He escapes his captors and sacrifices his humanity in pursuit of the Golden Path by physically fusing with a school of sandtrout, the larval form of sandworms, gaining superhuman strength and near-invulnerability. He travels across the desert destroying qanats to slow down the ecological transformation of Dune and eventually confronts the Preacher, who is indeed Paul.

Duncan returns to Arrakis and provokes Stilgar into killing him to force Stilgar to flee with Ghanima for their protection. Despite this, Alia eventually recaptures Ghanima and arranges her marriage to Farad'n. Alia secretly predicts Ghanima will kill Farad'n to avenge her brother's murder and makes plans to exploit the ensuing chaos. Paul and Leto return to the capital to confront Alia, where Jessica and Farad'n have arrived for his betrothal to Ghanima. Upon arriving, Paul is publicly murdered by agents of Alia's government, to her horror. Leto reveals himself in a display of superhuman strength and triggers the return of Ghanima's genuine memories. He confronts Alia and offers to help her overcome her possession, but the Baron resists. Alia, fighting the Baron's possession, manages to throw herself off a high balcony, killing both herself and the Baron.

Leto declares himself Emperor and asserts control over the Fremen. Farad'n enlists in his service and delivers control of the Corrino armies and his Sardaukar. In describing the Golden Path to Farad'n, Leto reveals that he will live for thousands of years due to the sandworm skin and genetics he is encased in. Leto marries Ghanima to consolidate power, but because his sandworm skin destroyed his ability to reproduce, he allows Farad'n to be her true consort so the Atreides line can continue. Ghanima reflects that one twin had to follow the Path, but Leto was always the strongest.

== Publication history ==
Parts of Dune Messiah and Children of Dune were written before Dune was completed. Children of Dune was originally serialized in Analog Science Fiction and Fact in 1976, and was the last Dune novel to be serialized before book publication. Dune Messiah and Children of Dune were published in one volume by the Science Fiction Book Club in 2002.

== Analysis ==
Herbert likened the initial trilogy of novels (Dune, Dune Messiah, and Children of Dune) to a fugue – Dune was a heroic melody, Dune Messiah was its inversion, while Children of Dune expands the number of interplaying themes. Paul rises to power in Dune by seizing control of the single critical resource in the universe, melange. His enemies are dead or overthrown, and he is set to take the reins of power and bring a hard but enlightened peace to the universe. Herbert chose in the books that followed to undermine Paul's triumph with a string of failures and philosophical paradoxes.

== Critical reception ==
Initially selling over 75,000 copies, Children of Dune became the first hardcover best-seller in the science fiction field. The novel was critically well-received for its gripping plot, action, and atmosphere, and was nominated for the Hugo Award for Best Novel in 1977.

The Los Angeles Times called Children of Dune "a major event", and Challenging Destiny noted that "Herbert adds enough new twists and turns to the ongoing saga that familiarity with the recurring elements brings pleasure." Publishers Weekly wrote, "Ranging from palace intrigue and desert chases to religious speculation and confrontations with the supreme intelligence of the universe, there is something here for all science fiction fans." In a 1976 review, Spider Robinson found Children of Dune unsatisfying, faulting the ending as unconvincing and thematically overfamiliar. The novel is referred to in A Thousand Plateaus (1980) by Gilles Deleuze and Félix Guattari. David Pringle gave the novel a rating of two stars out of four and described the novel as "dark and convoluted stuff."

== Adaptation ==
Dune Messiah (1969) and Children of Dune were collectively adapted by the Sci-Fi Channel in 2003 into a miniseries titled Frank Herbert's Children of Dune. The three-part, four-and-a-half-hour miniseries covers the bulk of the plot of Dune Messiah in the first installment, and adapts Children of Dune in the second and third parts.
