= God Emperor of Dune =

1981 science fiction novel by Frank Herbert

- First US edition
- Author: Frank Herbert
- Audio read by: Simon Vance
- Cover artist: Brad Holland
- Language: English
- Series: Dune series
- Genre: Science fiction
- Published: 1981
- Publisher: Putnam
- Publication place: United States
- Media type: Print (hardcover & paperback)
- Pages: 496
- ISBN: 0-575-02976-5
- OCLC: 16544554
- Preceded by: Children of Dune
- Followed by: Heretics of Dune

God Emperor of Dune is a science fiction novel by American writer Frank Herbert, published in 1981. The fourth in his Dune series of six novels, it was ranked as the No. 11 hardcover fiction best seller of 1981 by Publishers Weekly.

== Plot ==
Leto II Atreides, the God Emperor, has ruled the universe as a tyrant for 3,500 years after becoming a hybrid of human and sandworm. The death of all other sandworms as a result of the terraforming of Arrakis, and his control of the remaining supply of the all-important spice, has allowed him to keep civilization under his complete command. Leto has been physically transformed into a worm, retaining only his human face and arms, and though he is now seemingly immortal and invulnerable to harm, he is prone to instinct-driven bouts of violence when provoked to anger. As a result, his rule is one of religious awe and despotic fear.

Leto has disbanded the Landsraad to all but a few Great Houses; the remaining powers defer to his authority, although they individually conspire against him in secret. The Fremen have long since lost their military power and have been replaced by the Fish Speakers, an all-female army who obey Leto without question. He has rendered the human population into a state of trans-galactic stagnation; space travel is non-existent to most people in his empire, which he has deliberately kept to a near-medieval level of technological sophistication. All of this he has done in accordance with a prophecy divined through precognition that will establish an enforced peace preventing humanity from destroying itself through aggressive behavior.

Arrakis has been transformed via terraforming from a desert planet to a lush forested biosphere with the exception of "The Sareer", a single section of desert retained by Leto for his Citadel. A string of Duncan Idaho gholas have served Leto over the millennia, and, during that time, Leto has also fostered the bloodline of his twin sister Ghanima. Her descendant, Moneo Atreides, is Leto's majordomo and closest confidant, while Moneo's daughter, Siona, has become the leader of an Arrakis-based rebellion against Leto. She steals a set of Leto's secret journals from his archives, not realizing that he has allowed it. Leto intends to breed Siona with the latest Duncan ghola, but is aware that the ghola, moved by his own morality, may try to assassinate him before this can occur.

The Ixians send a new ambassador named Hwi Noree to serve Leto, and though he realizes that she has been specifically designed and trained to ensnare him, he cannot resist falling in love with her. She agrees to marry him. Leto tests Siona by taking her out to the middle of the desert. After improperly using her stillsuit to preserve moisture, dehydration forces her to accept Leto's offer of spice essence from his body to replenish her. Awakened to Leto's prophecy, which he calls the Golden Path, Siona is convinced of the importance of it. She remains dedicated to Leto's destruction, and an errant rainstorm demonstrates to her his mortal vulnerability to water.

When Duncan falls in love and copulates with Hwi, Moneo sends him and Siona out to Tuono Village, an outcropping along the Royal Procession road, to keep them safe from Leto's wrath. Leto changes the venue of his wedding from Tabur Village to Tuono Village. There, Siona and Duncan plan to assassinate Leto. As Leto's wedding procession moves across a high bridge over a river, Siona's Fish Speaker bodyguard Nayla, ordered by Leto to do whatever Siona says, destroys the support beams with a lasgun. The bridge collapses and Leto and his entourage, including Hwi, fall to their deaths into the river below. Leto's body rends apart in the water; the sandtrout which are part of his body encyst the water and scurry off, while the worm portion burns and disintegrates on the shore. Enraged by Hwi's death, Duncan kills Nayla.

With his dying breaths, Leto reveals a secret portion of the Golden Path: the production of a human who is invisible to prescient vision. Having begun millennia before with the union of Leto's twin sister Ghanima and Farad'n of House Corrino, Siona is the finished result, and she and her descendants will retain this ability. He explains that humanity is now free from the domination of oracles, free to scatter throughout the universe, never again to face complete domination or complete destruction. After revealing the location of his secret spice hoard, Leto dies, leaving Duncan and Siona to face the task of managing the empire.

The Ixians have also begun the construction of navigation computers that will render the Spacing Guild's Navigators obsolete. Leto's death causes the Scattering, a great forced exodus of the former Imperium citizens to other galaxies and planets.

== Analysis ==
In God Emperor of Dune, Frank Herbert analyzes the cyclical patterns of human society, as well as humanity's evolutionary drives. Using his ancestral memories, Leto II has knowledge of the entirety of human history and is able to recall the effects and patterns of tyrannical institutions, from the Babylonian empire through to the Jesuits on ancient Earth, and thus builds an empire existing as a complete nexus encompassing all these methods. This galactic empire differs from the historical tyrants in that it is deliberately designed to end in destruction, and is only instituted in the first place as part of a plan to rescue humanity from an absolute destruction which Leto II has foreseen through his prescient visions. Leto II personally explores the emergent effects of civilization, noting that most hierarchical structures are remnants of evolutionary urges toward safety. Thus, by forming a perfectly safe and stable empire, Leto II delivers a message to be felt throughout history.

Stylistically, the novel is permeated by quotations from, and speeches by its main character, Leto, to a degree unseen in any of the other Dune novels. The quotations are from Leto's own dictated records, made for future humanity. In part, this stylistic shift is an artifact of how Herbert wrote it: the first draft was written almost entirely in the first-person narrative voice, only being revised in later drafts to insert more third-person narration of events.

== Critical reception ==
God Emperor of Dune was ranked as the No. 11 hardcover fiction best seller of 1981 by Publishers Weekly. The Los Angeles Times wrote that the novel was "Rich fare ... heady stuff", and Time called it "a fourth visit to distant Arrakis that is every bit as fascinating as the other three—every bit as timely." Critic John Leonard of The New York Times was less charitable, stating the original Dune novel "was just about a perfect science fiction" that had not been improved on: "not in Dune Messiah, in Children of Dune or in God Emperor of Dune."

== In popular culture ==
The book is parodied in the animated television show The Grim Adventures of Billy & Mandy in the 2003–04 season episode "Mandy, the Merciless", with Mandy as the emperor Leto II, and Billy as Duncan Idaho.
