= Islamic governance =

Approach to leading Islamic nations

Islamic governance is the approach to leading Islamic nations and guiding their communities and organizations, all in line with the fundamental principles of Islam. It can be viewed as a governance model that integrates Islamic values into the realms of administration, rule, management, and government.

== Key principles ==
The term ‘Islamic governance' denotes a form of political rule guided by the teachings of the Quran and Sunnah. The philosophical underpinnings of an ideal Islamic governance system are rooted in several key principles. Tawhid, the doctrine of God's oneness, underscores the vertical axis of the Islamic ethical framework. Amanah, the concept of trust, governs the empowerment of individuals within the system. Al-‘adl wa al-ihsan, embodying justice, harmony, and benevolence, defines the horizontal plane of equity and societal compassion. Ukhuwwah emphasizes universal solidarity, while islah represents the relentless quest for holistic excellence, anchored in ethical and moral integrity. M. A. Muqtedar Khan identifies three pivotal principles of Islamic governance that are found in Islamic sources such as the Quran, the prophetic tradition Sunnah, and current Muslim discourse on the Islamic state: a structured constitution, the necessity of consent, and the practice of consultation.

== Objectives ==
Maqāṣid al-sharīah, or the higher objectives of Islamic law, involve ensuring justice throughout the community by protecting and advancing human well-being, which is the fundamental goal of governance. Thus, Islamic governance is centered on managing public affairs and resources for the common good, setting and enforcing laws and policies, and ensuring these align with the Qur'an and Sunnah.

Islamic governance... aims for a holistic moral-laden philosophy that will eventually lead to ‘human well-being’ with the emphasis on unity, peace and cohesion. Thus, Islamic governance rather than making reference to the creation of institutions, aims at developing ‘aware’ individuals or homoIslamicus that can then shape the institutions.

— Malik Maszlee, Foundations of Islamic Governance: A Southeast Asian Perspective, 2017

Malik Maszlee states that conventional methods focus on whether institutions alone can deliver good governance, whereas the Islamic approach centers on the development of individuals as crucial for good governance. In other words, conventional functionalism views institutions as the primary objective with individuals as the means to that end, while the Islamic perspective sees individuals as the ultimate goal, using institutions as a means to achieve it. Abdul Rashid Moten, however, states that most Muslim scholars and political leaders see Islamic governance as a fusion of Islamic principles with advantageous aspects of modern Western governance models.

== In practice ==
=== Legislative dimension ===
The prevailing view in Islamic history and political theory is that legislation based on ijtihad is reserved for Islamic jurists (‘ulama’), given their expertise in interpreting religious texts. However, some challenge this idea, noting that legislative work often goes beyond issuing fatwas or interpreting scripture. Rached Ghannouchi argues that much of legislation involves addressing societal conditions, group dynamics, and complex modern issues that require input from various experts. He contends that limiting legislative authority to jurists alone is unfair and against the public interest, as it excludes the contributions of other specialists necessary for sound and informed decision-making.

=== Women participation ===
Abu’l-A‘la al-Mawdudi argued in his proposed Islamic constitution for Pakistan that political offices should be reserved for men. He based this view on a Quranic verse stating, “Men are the protectors and maintainers of women,” and a hadith from al-Bukhari’s collection that says, “A people ruled by a woman will never prosper.” Mawdudi interpreted these texts to mean that women should not hold key positions in the state, such as the presidency, ministries, membership in the Shura Assembly. Ghannouchi, however, states that no one before Mawdudi used the above quoted verse for prohibiting public offices from women. He states that with the exception of the office of the imamate, or head of state, "in which there was a consensus or near consensus among these scholars about forbidding this office to women based on the above hadith", there is nothing in the Islamic corpus that bars women from holding public offices.

== Ihsan based approach ==
M. A. Muqtedar Khan, in his book Islam and Good Governance offers an ihsan based perspective on Islamic governance, emphasizing that it is not just about the implementation of Islamic laws. He believes that Islamic governance should aim to achieve virtuous goals such as social justice, tolerance, acceptance, compassion, and peace, which he refers to as the "state of Ihsan." According to Khan, Muslim political and academic discussions largely concentrate on applying Islamic laws and rules under shariah, while neglecting the concept of ihsan, which refers to performing virtuous and beautiful deeds, the ultimate goal for a true believer. Since the Qur'an prohibits compulsion in religion, Khan supports Abdullahi A. An-Na‘im's approach to creating a secular state that doesn't force religious adherence but fosters a religiously inspired society through initiatives within civil society, guided by Islamic values. He thus envisions the "state of ihsan" as a secular state that does not impose religious beliefs or values but fosters a supportive environment where diverse ethical and virtuous communities and movements can promote the quest for individual and societal improvement without fear of intimidation. S Sakarya criticized Khan's approach, saying that "While trying to save Islam from Muslims, Khan seems to create his own imagined community of Muslims in order to establish his utopian state..".

== Sources ==
- Malik, Maszlee (2017). "Architectonics of Islamic Governance". Foundations of Islamic Governance: A Southeast Asian Perspective. Rutledge.
- Islam, Md. Rafiqul (2019). "Islamic Governance". Global Encyclopedia of Public Administration, Public Policy, and Governance. Cham: Springer International Publishing. pp. 1–9. doi:10.1007/978-3-319-31816-5_2618-1. ISBN 978-3-319-31816-5.
- Ghannouchi, Rached (2020). "The Basic Principles of Islamic Governance". Public Freedoms in the Islamic State. Yale University Press. pp. 115–286. doi:10.12987/yale/9780300211528.003.0005. ISBN 978-0-300-21152-8.
- Khan, M.A.M. (2019). Islam and Good Governance: A Political Philosophy of Ihsan. Palgrave Macmillan US. ISBN 978-1-137-54832-0.
- Bouzenita, A. I. (2012). "Early Contributions to the Theory of Islamic Governance: Abd al-Rahman al-Awza'i". Journal of Islamic Studies. 23 (2): 137–164. doi:10.1093/jis/ets041. ISSN 0955-2340.
- Moten, Abdul Rashid (2015). "Striving for Islamic governance: Varying Contexts, Different Strategies". American Journal of Islam and Society. 32 (2): 68–89. doi:10.35632/ajis.v32i2.267. ISSN 2690-3741.
- Sakarya, Sümeyye (2019). "Book review: Islam and Good Governance". ReOrient. 5 (1). doi:10.13169/reorient.5.1.0125. ISSN 2055-5601.
- Malik, Maszlee (2019). "Constructing an Alternative Concept of Islamic Governance: A Maqāṣidic Approach". Kemanusiaan the Asian Journal of Humanities. 26 (Supplement 1): 89–108. doi:10.21315/kajh2019.26.s1.5.
