= Dune (2021 film) =

Film by Denis Villeneuve

- Release poster
- Directed by: Denis Villeneuve
- Screenplay by: Jon Spaihts; Denis Villeneuve; Eric Roth
- Based on: Dune by Frank Herbert
- Produced by: Mary Parent; Denis Villeneuve; Cale Boyter; Joe Caracciolo Jr.
- Starring: Timothée Chalamet; Zendaya; Rebecca Ferguson; Oscar Isaac; Josh Brolin; Stellan Skarsgård; Dave Bautista; Stephen M. Henderson; Chang Chen; Sharon Duncan-Brewster; Charlotte Rampling; Jason Momoa; Javier Bardem
- Cinematography: Greig Fraser
- Edited by: Joe Walker
- Music by: Hans Zimmer
- Production company: Legendary Pictures
- Distributed by: Warner Bros. Pictures
- Release dates: September 3, 2021 (Venice); October 22, 2021 (United States)
- Running time: 155 minutes
- Country: United States
- Language: English
- Budget: $165 million
- Box office: $411 million

Dune (titled on-screen as Dune: Part One) is a 2021 American epic space opera film co-produced and directed by Denis Villeneuve, who co-wrote the screenplay with Jon Spaihts and Eric Roth. It is the first of a two-part adaptation of the 1965 novel by Frank Herbert and the first installment in Villeneuve's Dune film trilogy. The cast includes Timothée Chalamet, Rebecca Ferguson, Oscar Isaac, Josh Brolin, Stellan Skarsgård, Dave Bautista, Stephen McKinley Henderson, Zendaya, Chang Chen, Sharon Duncan-Brewster, Charlotte Rampling, Jason Momoa, and Javier Bardem. Set in the distant future, the film follows Paul Atreides (Chalamet) as his family, the aristocratic House Atreides, is thrust into a war for the inhospitable desert planet Arrakis.

The film is the third adaptation of Dune, following David Lynch's 1984 film and John Harrison's 2000 television miniseries. After an unsuccessful attempt by Paramount Pictures to produce a new adaptation, Legendary Pictures acquired the Dune film and television rights in 2016, with Villeneuve signing on as director in February 2017. Production contracts were secured only for the first film, relying on its success before a sequel would be produced. Principal photography took place from March to July 2019 in Hungary, Jordan, Norway, the United Arab Emirates, and other locations.

Dune was scheduled for a late 2020 release, but was delayed due to the COVID-19 pandemic. The film premiered at the 78th Venice International Film Festival on September 3, 2021, before its international release on September 15, 2021; it was then released in United States theaters and via streaming on HBO Max on October 22, 2021. Dune grossed $411 million on a $165 million budget and received positive reviews from critics and audiences. It won six awards at the 94th Academy Awards and was nominated in four other categories, in addition to receiving numerous other accolades.

A sequel, Dune: Part Two, was released on March 1, 2024, covering the novel's second half, and another sequel, Dune: Part Three, based on Herbert's 1969 novel Dune Messiah, is scheduled to be released on December 18, 2026.

== Plot ==
In the distant future, Duke Leto Atreides is assigned by the Padishah Emperor Shaddam IV to replace Baron Vladimir Harkonnen as the fiefholder of Arrakis, a harsh desert planet and the sole source of "spice", a valuable psychotropic substance that imparts heightened vitality and awareness. Spice is also key to interstellar travel. Emperor Shaddam, fearful of Leto's rising power, plots for House Harkonnen, aided by his Sardaukar troops, to retake Arrakis and destroy House Atreides. Leto is suspicious of the Emperor but weighs the risks against the power of controlling Arrakis and making an alliance with its mysterious natives, the Fremen.

Leto's concubine, Lady Jessica, is an acolyte of the Bene Gesserit—a sisterhood whose members possess advanced physical and mental abilities. As part of a centuries-long breeding program, they instructed her to bear a daughter whose son would become the Kwisatz Haderach—a messianic superbeing with the prescience necessary to guide humanity to a better future. Jessica disobeyed and bore a son, Paul, whom she trains in Bene Gesserit practices. Paul also receives mentorship from Leto's aides Duncan Idaho, Gurney Halleck, Wellington Yueh, and Thufir Hawat. The Reverend Mother and Imperial Truthsayer Gaius Helen Mohiam subjects Paul to a highly dangerous gom jabbar test to assess his humanity and impulse control, which he passes. Paul begins having troubling visions of the future.

House Atreides arrives on Arrakis. The Fremen revere Paul and Jessica, which she explains is due to the Bene Gesserit sowing beliefs on Arrakis centuries earlier. An attempt to assassinate Paul fails. At a secret meeting on the Harkonnen planet Giedi Prime, Mohiam insists that Baron Harkonnen spare Paul and Jessica in his coup, to which he duplicitously agrees. Leto meets and negotiates with Fremen chieftain Stilgar and meets the Imperial Judge of the Change, Dr. Liet Kynes, a planetologist who lives among the Fremen. During a flight over the desert, they rescue a stranded spice-harvesting crew from a giant sandworm, and Paul's exposure to the spice triggers intense premonitions.

Yueh betrays the Atreides and disables Arrakeen's shields, allowing the Harkonnens and Sardaukar to invade. Yueh incapacitates Leto, planning to exchange him for his wife, the Baron's prisoner. Yueh replaces one of Leto's teeth with a poison gas capsule with which Leto can assassinate the Baron. After the Baron kills Yueh, Leto releases the gas, killing himself and the Baron's Mentat, Piter De Vries, but the Baron survives. Though the Baron arranged to have Paul and Jessica dropped deep in the desert to die, Yueh had left them with a fremkit with survival supplies. Jessica uses the Voice technique to overpower and kill their captors. Overnighting in the desert, Paul—surrounded by spice—has visions of a bloody holy war fought across the universe in his name.

After conquering Arrakis, Baron Harkonnen appoints his nephew Rabban to oversee the planet, and orders him to restart spice production to recoup the invasion's cost. Meanwhile, Duncan and Kynes find Jessica and Paul, who discloses his plan to marry one of Emperor Shaddam's daughters to avert a potential civil war arising from the Emperor's betrayal. When they are discovered by Sardaukar soldiers, Duncan sacrifices himself to enable Paul and Jessica to escape. Kynes also tries to escape, but is stabbed by an assassin and devoured by a sandworm along with her attackers. Deep in the desert, Paul and Jessica encounter Stilgar's tribe, including Chani, the young woman from Paul's visions. When Stilgar commands lenience towards Paul and Jessica, the Fremen warrior Jamis challenges them to a ritual duel to the death; Paul accepts and wins. Contrary to Jessica's wishes, Paul joins the Fremen, determined to fulfill his father's goal of bringing peace to Arrakis.

== Cast ==
- Timothée Chalamet as Paul Atreides, the ducal heir of House Atreides
- Rebecca Ferguson as Lady Jessica, Paul's Bene Gesserit mother and concubine of Leto
- Oscar Isaac as Duke Leto Atreides, Paul's father and the leader of House Atreides who becomes the Duke of Arrakis
- Josh Brolin as Gurney Halleck, the weapons master of House Atreides and one of Paul's mentors
- Stellan Skarsgård as Baron Vladimir Harkonnen, the leader of House Harkonnen, an enemy of House Atreides, and the former steward of Arrakis
- Dave Bautista as Glossu Rabban, the nephew of Baron Harkonnen
- Sharon Duncan-Brewster as Dr. Liet Kynes, an Imperial planetologist and Judge of the Change on Arrakis
- Stephen McKinley Henderson as Thufir Hawat, the Mentat of House Atreides
- Zendaya as Chani, a young Fremen woman who appears in Paul's visions
- Chang Chen as Dr. Wellington Yueh, a Suk doctor employed by House Atreides
- Charlotte Rampling as Reverend Mother Mohiam, the Emperor's Bene Gesserit Truthsayer
- Jason Momoa as Duncan Idaho, the swordmaster of House Atreides and one of Paul's mentors
- Javier Bardem as Stilgar, the leader of the Fremen tribe at Sietch Tabr
- David Dastmalchian as Piter De Vries, the Mentat of House Harkonnen
- Babs Olusanmokun as Jamis, a Fremen from Sietch Tabr
- Golda Rosheuvel as Shadout Mapes, a Fremen working as a housekeeper for House Atreides
- Roger Yuan as Lieutenant Lanville, Gurney Halleck's second-in-command
- Neil Bell as Sardaukar Bashar, the leader of the Emperor's skilled army, the Sardaukar.

Additionally, Benjamin Clementine portrays the Herald of the Change, the head of an Imperial delegation to Caladan. Jean Gilpin, Ellen Dubin and Marianne Faithfull (in her final film role) voice the ancestral Bene Gesserit whose voices are heard by Paul in his visions. Joe Walker, the film's editor, provides the narration for Paul's filmbooks about Arrakis. Choreographer Milena Sidorova portrays the Baron's human-spider hybrid pet via motion capture.

== Production ==
=== Background ===
Following the publication of Frank Herbert's novel Dune in 1965, it was considered to have potential for a possible film adaptation. Since 1971, various producers have held film adaptation rights for the novel. Attempts to make an adaptation based on the book were considered to be "unfilmable" due to its breadth of content. The book's status among fans meant that deviations without strong justification could potentially harm the film's reputation.

Alejandro Jodorowsky acquired the rights in the 1970s to make a fourteen-hour adaptation of the book, but the project ultimately failed to secure sufficient funds. This development effort became the subject of the documentary film Jodorowsky's Dune (2013). David Lynch's Dune, produced by Raffaella De Laurentiis in 1984, was intended as a three-hour film but was cut to 137 minutes; it was poorly received and Lynch himself ended up disowning it. In 1996, producer Richard P. Rubinstein acquired the rights to the novel. Frank Herbert's Dune, a live-action miniseries produced by Rubinstein and directed by John Harrison, aired on the Sci Fi Channel in 2000; it was a ratings hit and was generally better received than Lynch's film. Some reviewers criticized the miniseries for lacking the spectacle afforded to a feature film production, as well as for staying too faithful to the book and being bogged down by exposition. Prospects to make a successful adaptation of Dune improved after the critical and commercial success of the film series adaptations of The Lord of the Rings and Harry Potter, both of which maintained most of the works' key characters and plots while managing the limited running time. In 2008, Paramount Pictures hired Peter Berg to direct an adaptation. Berg left the project in October 2009, with director Pierre Morel being hired in January 2010. Paramount later cancelled the project in March 2011, as they could not come to key agreements, with their rights reverting to Rubinstein.

=== Development ===
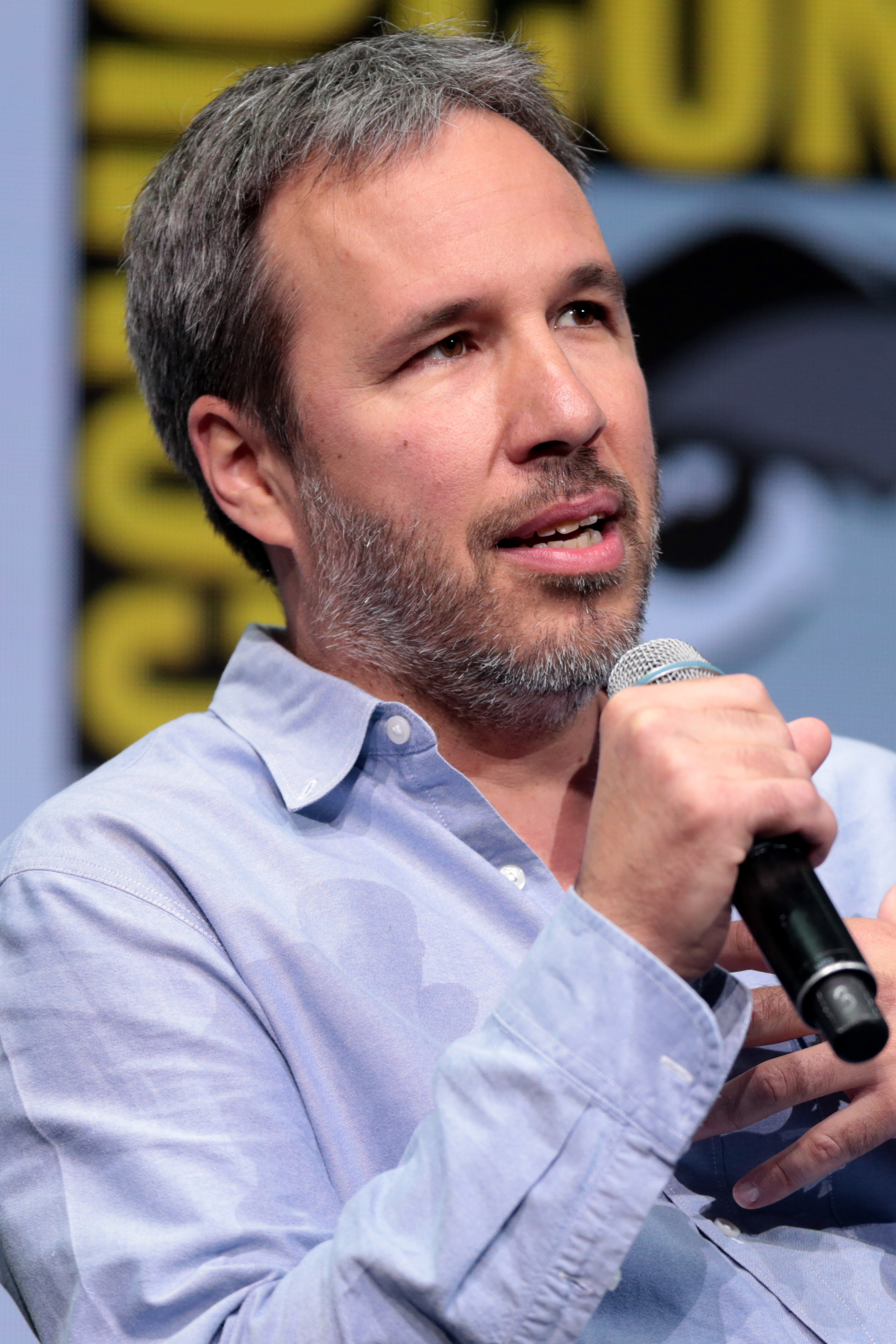
Denis Villeneuve said that adapting Dune was a lifelong ambition. He was hired to direct in February 2017.

In 2011, Mary Parent, vice chair of worldwide production for Legendary Pictures, and her producing partner Cale Boyter, acquired adaptation rights for Dune. Legendary obtained film and television rights for Dune in November 2016. Canadian filmmaker Denis Villeneuve expressed interest in the project in September 2016, saying that it had been a longstanding dream of his to adapt Dune. By December, he was in talks with the studio to direct, and his enthusiasm and vision for the film motivated Parent to hire him. Villeneuve chose to complete Arrival (2016) and Blade Runner 2049 (2017) first, to give himself more time to develop and co-write Dune. By February 2017, he was officially confirmed as the film's director.

Some of Villeneuve's previous collaborators on Arrival and Blade Runner 2049 returned for Dune, including film editor Joe Walker, production designer Patrice Vermette, visual effects supervisor Paul Lambert, sound designer and editor Theo Green, sound editor Mark Mangini, and special effects supervisor Gerd Nefzer. Other previous collaborators were slated to work on Dune but dropped out before production began, including visual effects supervisor John Nelson and cinematographer Roger Deakins, who was replaced in December 2018 with Greig Fraser. Dune was produced by Villeneuve, Parent and Boyter, with Tanya Lapointe, Brian Herbert, Byron Merritt, Kim Herbert, Thomas Tull, Jon Spaihts, Richard P. Rubinstein, John Harrison, and Herbert W. Gain serving as executive producers and Kevin J. Anderson as creative consultant. Game of Thrones language creator David J. Peterson was confirmed as a constructed language developer for the film in April 2019.

=== Writing ===
In March 2018, Villeneuve stated that his goal was to adapt the novel into a two-part film series, as he felt it was too large and complex for only one film. He secured a two-film deal with Warner Bros. Pictures in the same style as the two-part adaptation of Stephen King's It in 2017 and 2019. Eric Roth was hired to co-write the screenplay in April, with Legendary CEO Joshua Grode affirming that the studio planned on making a sequel. Roth, who had read the book as a child, had a neutral opinion of it, which he felt gave him an objective view of it. He wrote a 50-page treatment for the film and focused on appealing not only to people who enjoyed the book, but also those who did not remember or care for the book, as well as those who were not familiar with it at all. Villeneuve completed a first draft of the screenplay by May, and a fourth draft was submitted in July. (Note: Attributed to multiple references:) Jon Spaihts was hired as another co-writer in September.

When writing the script, Villeneuve chose not to take inspiration from Lynch's Dune or concepts Jodorowsky envisioned for his Dune film. Villeneuve considered his screenplay a coming-of-age story and "a call for action for the youth", noting the book's social commentary regarding capitalism and the exploitation of natural resources such as oil. In doing so, Villeneuve wanted to recreate the experience he had felt when he initially read the book as a teenager. He adjusted and modified many parts of the novel for the film, and wanted to keep "the atmosphere and poetry ... intact". This included eliminating internal monologues and epigraphs used in the book and simplifying the "pseudo-antiquated" dialogue. Instead, he emphasized Paul and Jessica's relationship as the main focus of the story, and gave them a secret hand gesture language they could use to communicate silently to each other. The film also minimizes the political aspects of the Dune world in order to retain the book's scale and exploration of power dynamics while also focus on Paul's growth. The inclusion of the informative holographic filmbook videos for Paul was adapted from the book, with Villeneuve wanting it to convey Paul's "appetite for learning" and his desire to learn about the Arrakis and Fremen culture.

Some characters from the novel were given less prominence in the film, such as Baron Harkonnen, members of his court, and the Mentats Thufir Hawat and Piter De Vries, but these characters were developed enough to allow their use in the future. Villeneuve felt the novel portrayed the Baron as a caricature, and he sought to depict him instead as a complex antagonist in the film, taking inspiration from the character Colonel Kurtz in Apocalypse Now (1979). The character arcs of the female characters in the novel were altered to give them more prominence, as Villeneuve felt femininity was a crucial theme in the book. Ferguson stated that while Villeneuve respected Herbert's characterization in the book, Villeneuve's modifications had helped improve the quality of female characters by expanding the role of Lady Jessica as a soldier and member of the Bene Gesserit. As such, the studio labeled this role a "warrior priestess", in contrast to the joking label of "space nun" that Villeneuve felt was implied by the book.

=== Casting ===
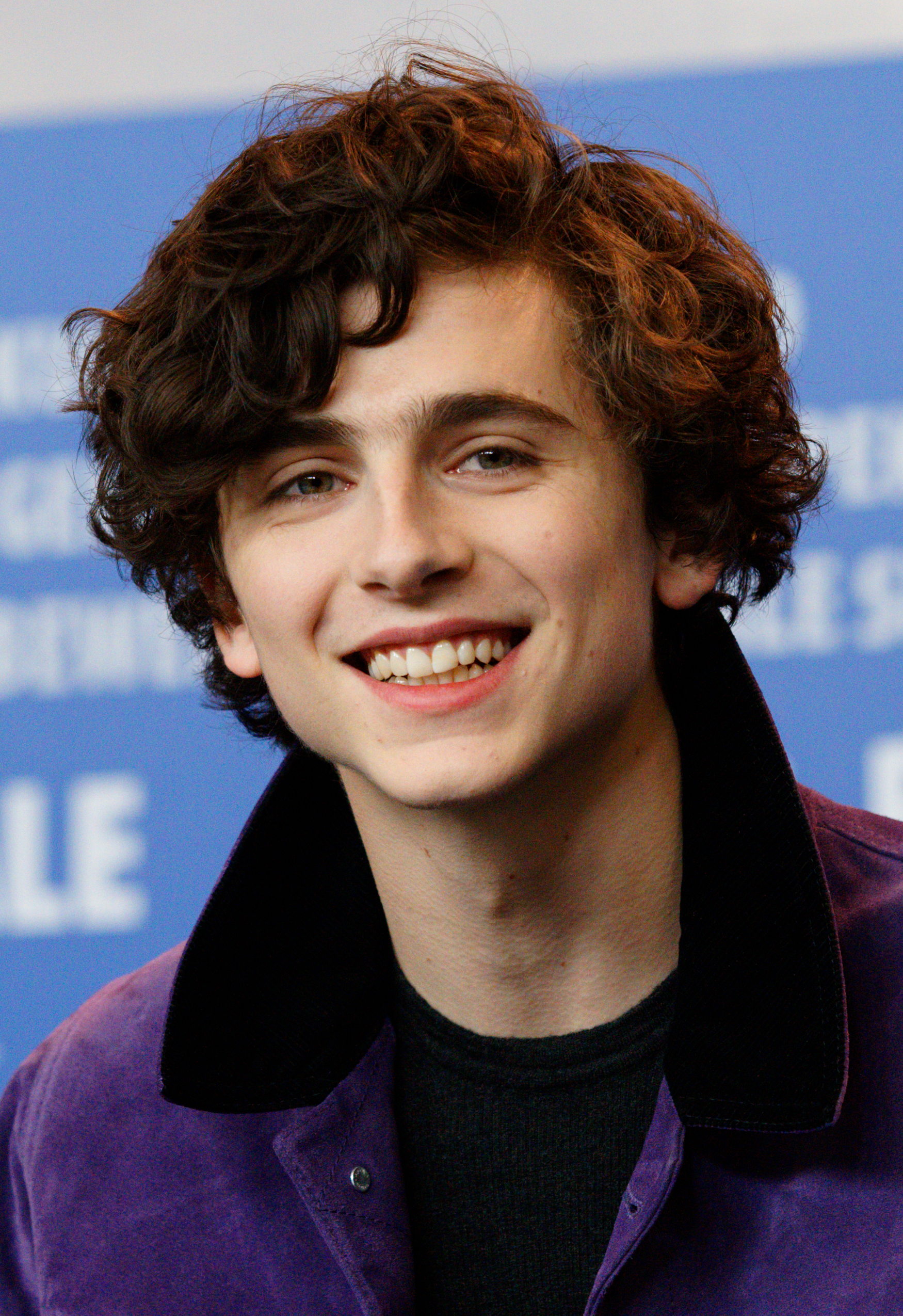
Timothée Chalamet
(Paul Atreides)

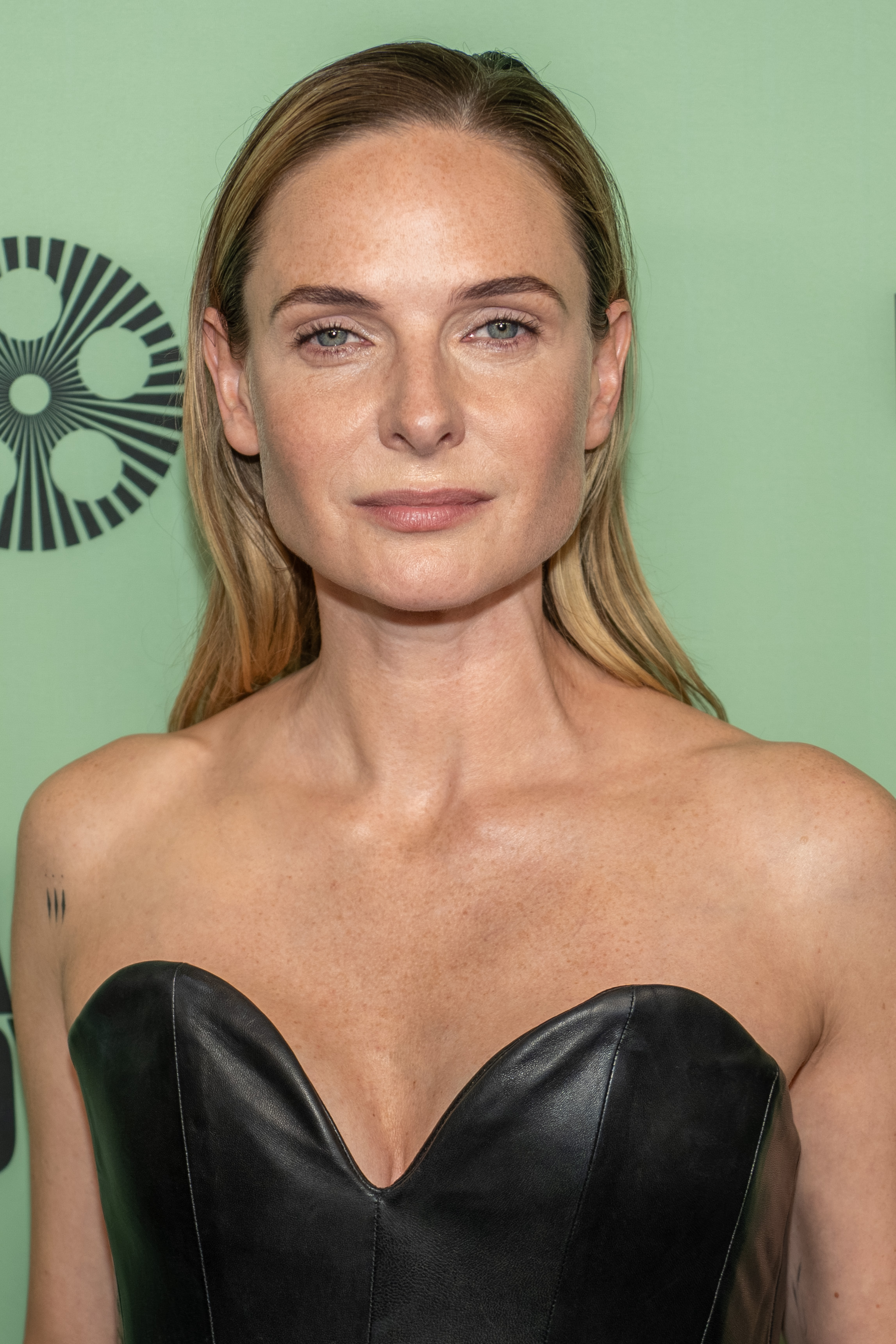
Rebecca Ferguson
(Lady Jessica)

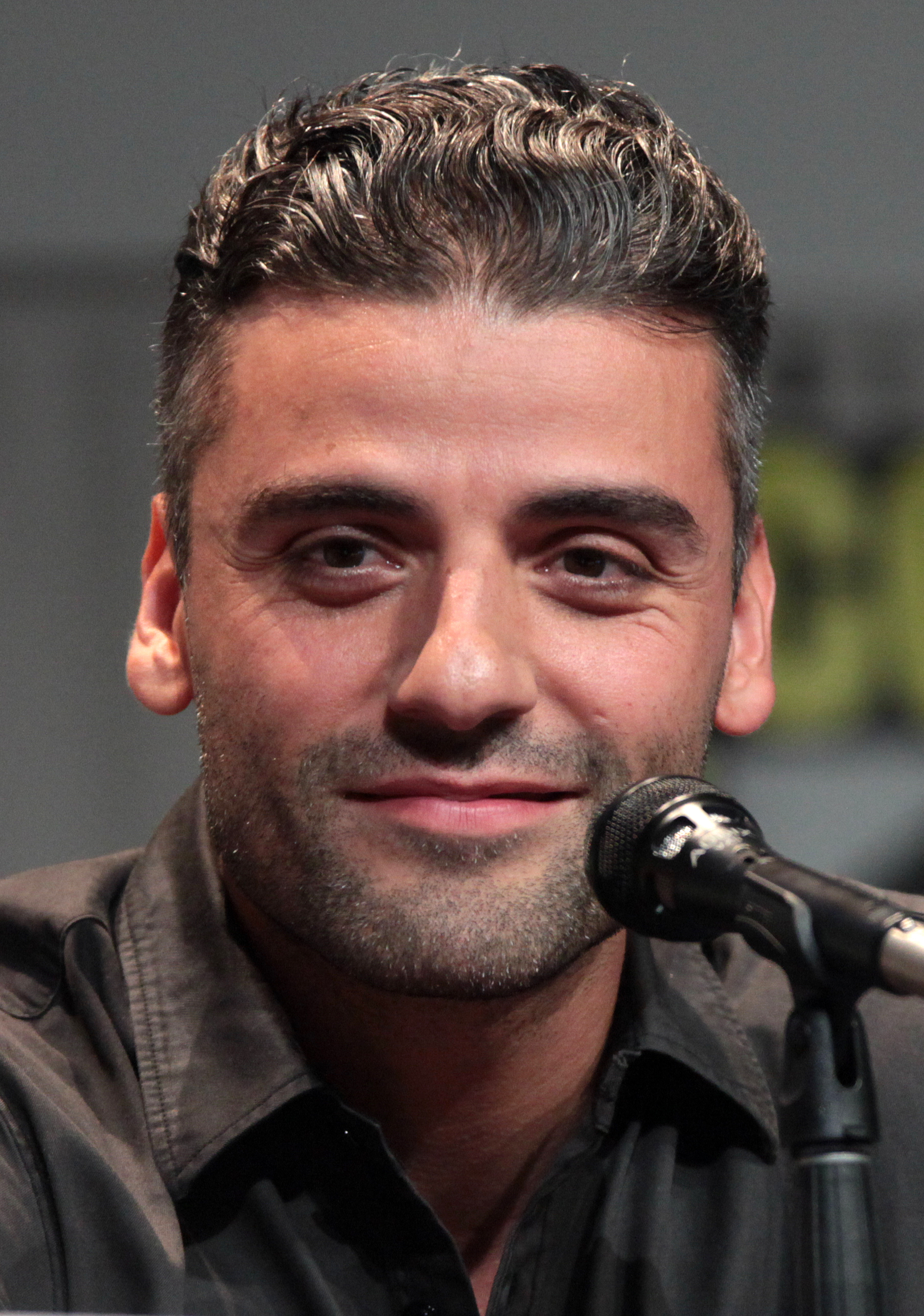
Oscar Isaac
(Leto Atreides)

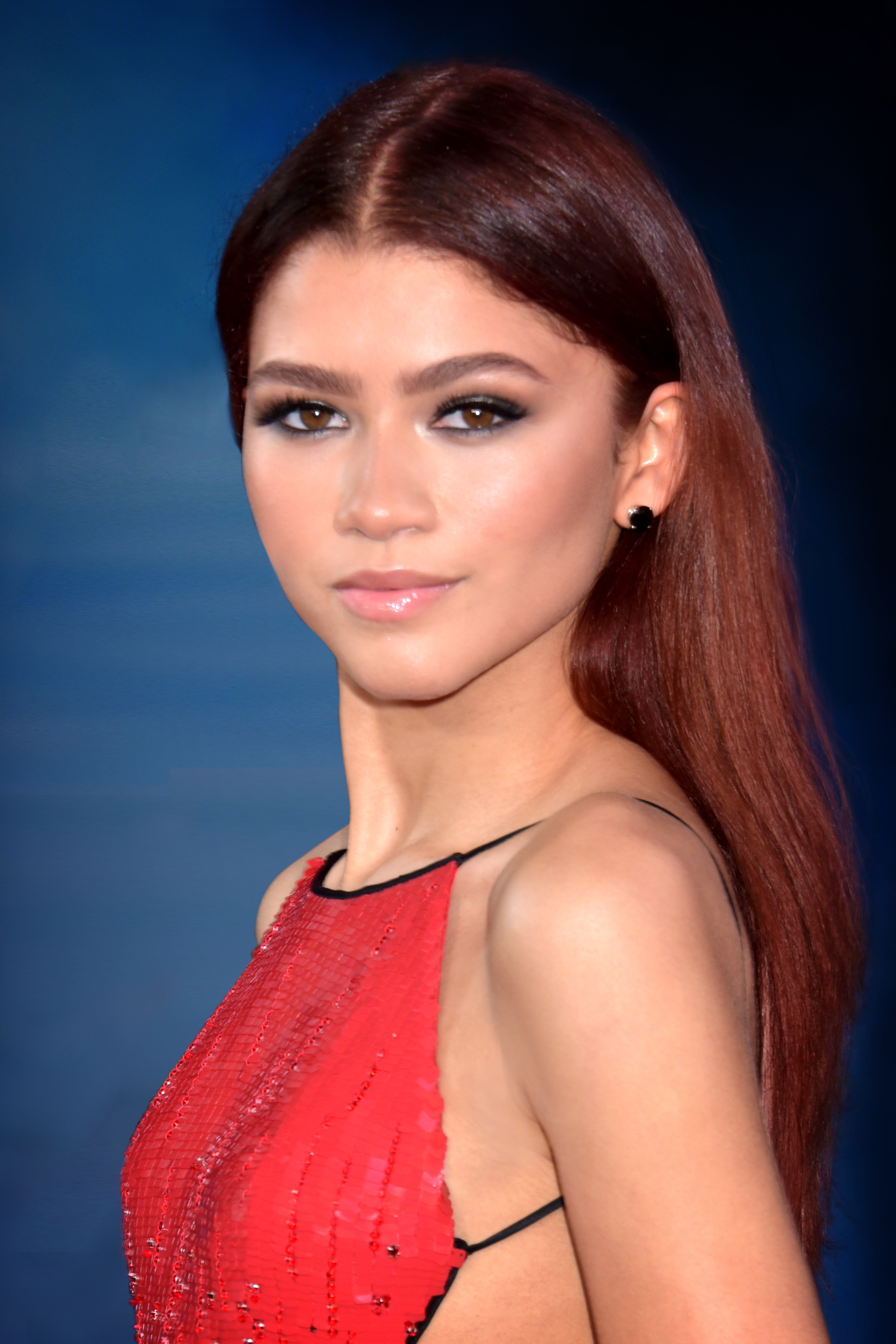
Zendaya
(Chani)

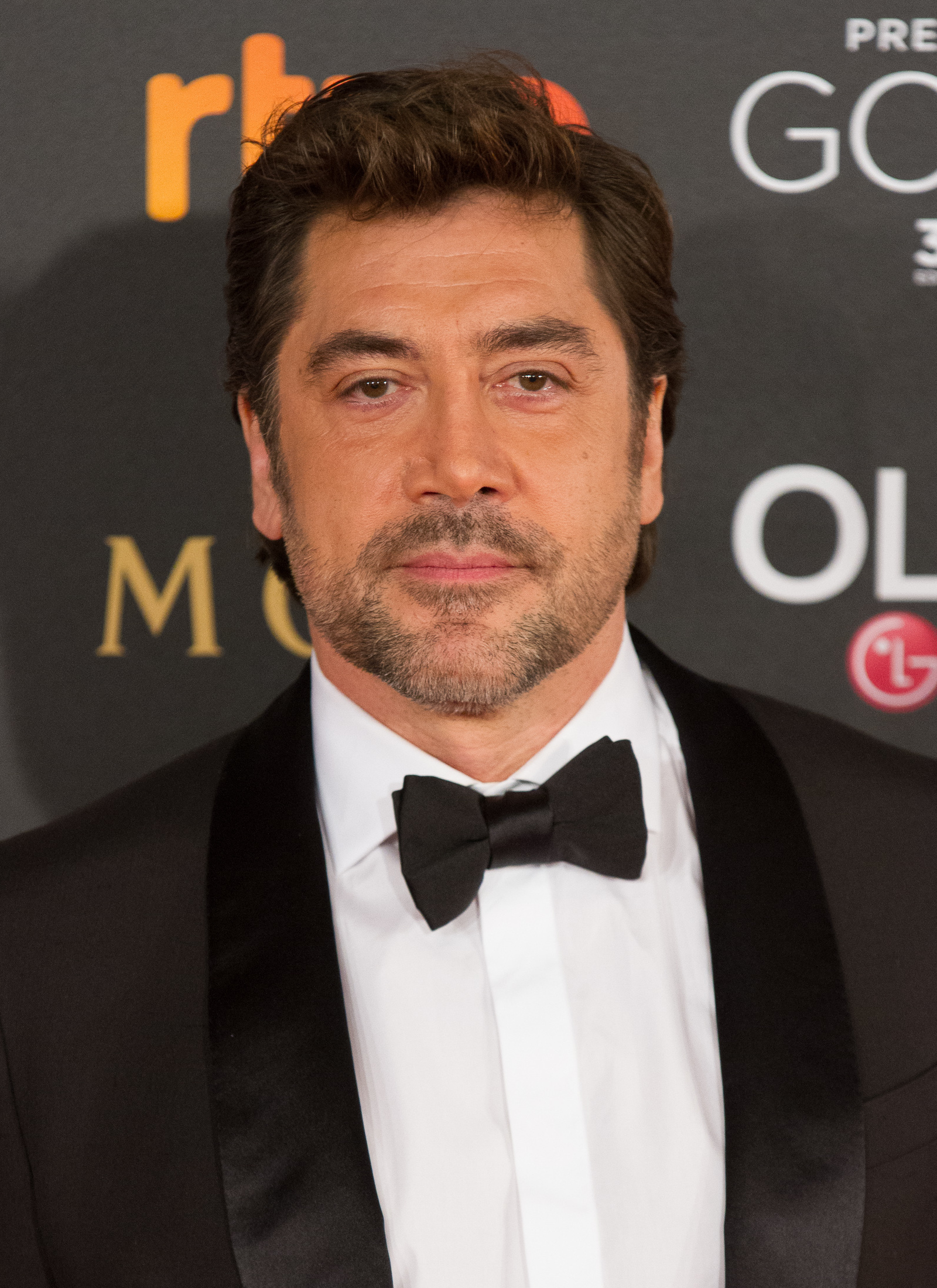
Javier Bardem
(Stilgar)

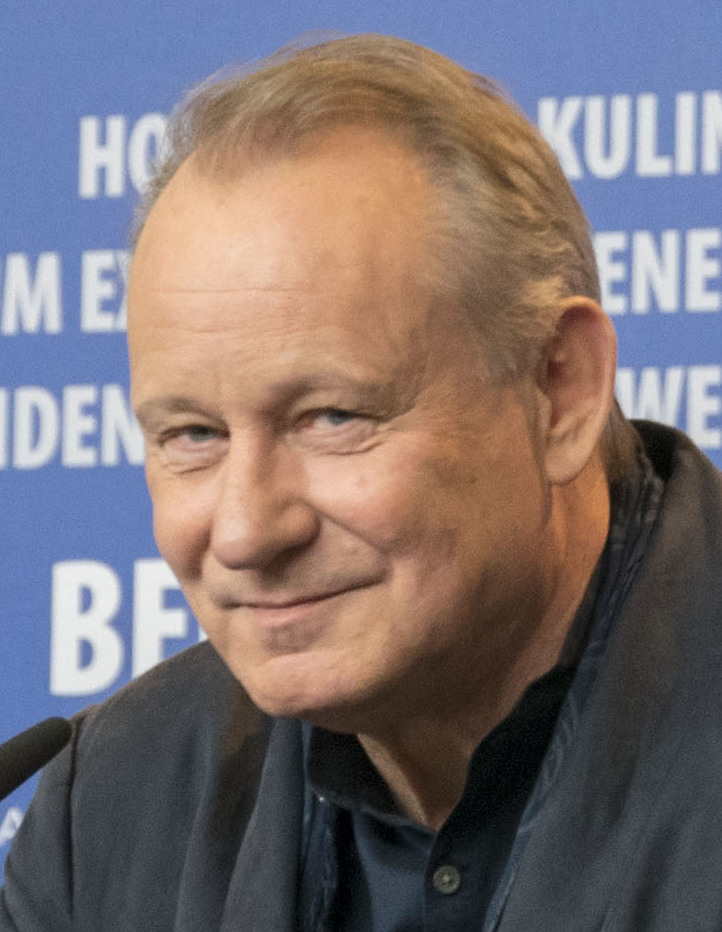
Stellan Skarsgård
(Baron Vladimir Harkonnen)

Villeneuve began the casting process by first determining who would portray Paul Atreides. He approached actors on an individual basis and felt the final cast was close to his "dream list". For Paul, Villeneuve wanted an actor who had "an old soul in the body of a teenager". He identified Timothée Chalamet as the ideal choice for the role, later admitting that he had no alternate choices in mind. Chalamet, who previously auditioned for a role in Villeneuve's Prisoners (2013), also desired to collaborate with Villeneuve and appear in Dune. He travelled to the Cannes Film Festival to discuss the role with Villeneuve. Chalamet entered final negotiations to play the role of Paul in July 2018. Rebecca Ferguson entered negotiations that September to play the role of Lady Jessica, Paul's mother, with Chalamet already confirmed for the role of Paul. Ferguson was initially dismissive of the role, as she felt it was too similar to her Mission: Impossible role as Ilsa Faust. Ferguson did not want to be typecast as a "strong female character". However, she was convinced after hearing Villeneuve's ideas and reading the book, saying she enjoyed the "simplicity of wanting to save something you have created and all of these shades". She had been cast by January 2019.

Casting director Francine Maisler had compiled over 30–50 audition tapes from actors for Villeneuve to decide from when casting secondary roles. Dave Bautista was offered the role of Glossu Rabban following a phone call from Villeneuve. He was an avid fan of Villeneuve and wanted to contact him, but was surprised when Villeneuve contacted him first and said he was proud of being offered the role. Villeneuve wanted Stellan Skarsgård to portray Baron Vladimir Harkonnen as he had found Skarsgård intimidating, and personally contacted Charlotte Rampling in order to portray Gaius Helen Mohiam, who accepted as she enjoyed Villeneuve's work. Oscar Isaac contacted Villeneuve about starring in the film once he heard it was in development. Villeneuve cast him as Duke Leto, with Isaac commenting the role suited him physically. Zendaya auditioned for the role of Chani alongside five other actresses. She was chosen as she was considered to have the best performance with Chalamet. Jenna Ortega also auditioned for the role. Bautista, Skarsgård, Rampling, Isaac, and Zendaya all joined the cast in January 2019.

In the next month, Javier Bardem, Josh Brolin, Jason Momoa, and David Dastmalchian were cast as Stilgar, Gurney Halleck, Duncan Idaho, and Piter de Vries, respectively. Villeneuve directly called Bardem and offered him the role, who was shocked as he wanted to portray Stilgar, comparing it to his personal love for Aragorn in The Lord of the Rings. Meanwhile, Brolin amusingly commented that he pretended to read the script prior to accepting the role, while Momoa received his casting call when he was snowboarding down a mountain. He later contacted Villeneuve on a Skype call to confirm his involvement. Dastmalchian's casting was similar to Brolin and Momoa's, as he received a call while he was in his Los Angeles home, and accepted the role without reading the script due to his confidence in Villeneuve. Stephen McKinley Henderson joined in March, with Chang Chen entering negotiations. Maisler chose Henderson after admiring his work in New York theaters, and curated a list of the "most talented" Chinese actors for the role of Dr. Yueh. Despite initial difficulties contacting Chen, they eventually contacted his manager in China. Afterwards, Chen accepted his role as Dr. Yueh. The decision to cast Benjamin Clementine as the Herald of the Change occurred after Maisler enjoyed his performance in the Tiny Desk Concerts.

Sharon Duncan-Brewster auditioned for her role in London through Jina Jay, a casting director working with Maisler at the time, saying that she "exudes an intelligence and a power and an inner strength". When Maisler presented a shortlist for potential cast members, Villeneuve selected Duncan-Brewster. Her casting was confirmed in April 2020. The idea to change Kynes' gender was suggested by Jon Spaihts, which Villeneuve promptly accepted. According to Duncan-Brewster, Villeneuve opted for the change as he felt it was not necessary to adhere to all of the elements in the book in order to remain faithful to the character's nature.

=== Pre-production ===
==== Set and props ====
The set design was done by production designer Patrice Vermette. Vermette based the set design for Dune by the need "to ground the story into realistic settings to help the audience believe in the extraordinary elements". He sought to make the sets as realistic and immersive as possible, using minimal set extensions and no greenscreens. Prior to the creation of any sets or visual effects, Villeneuve and a group of specific people, worked together to define the visual language for the film.

Vermette created a "visual bible" to guide the development of set design and keep it consistent with the film's visual effects design, intending to help "extrapolate the world". He also re-read the novel, as he felt that "the book gives a lot of clues or cues that will help you navigate it to design things, but it's quite nonspecific", adding that he wanted to support Villeneuve's original vision of the novel when he read it as a young teenager, and base the design around Herbert's original novel. The team's early mood boards for the visual language of the film consisted of Mesopotamian ziggurat architecture, Egyptian references, World War II bunkers, Brazilian and Soviet brutalist architecture, minimalist megastructures and dams designed by Superstudio, and imagery of glaciers taking over mountains.

The design for the ornithopters was conceived by Villeneuve and storyboard artist Sam Hudecki. Villeneuve wanted the ornithopter to be "muscular"; he wanted it to resemble a dragonfly and helicopter, but also appear realistic and adhere to basic laws of science. This fit in with his overall perception of the Dune world being retro-futuristic and analog. He also wanted the cockpits to be designed so that the actors could see the landscape. Two functional ornithopter models, 48- and 75-feet long, were created for filming by London propmakers, with operable doors and interior cockpit areas. They weighed over 11 tons and required an Antonov cargo plane to transport them to filming locations in Hungary and Jordan. One ornithopter used in filming had customizable pieces allowing for more space. Cranes were used to make the models fly.

Many practical sets were created on the soundstages and backlots of the Origo Film Studios in Budapest, Hungary, serving as interiors for the three planets. When designing Caladan, Vermette sought to give the planet "a feeling of melancholia". He wanted Caladan to resemble autumn in Canada, his home country, as he thought that it represented "the end of a cycle... or the beginning of a new one". He identified "dramatic coastal mountain ranges" and forests containing Norwegian pines as defining features of the planet. Meanwhile, the interior sets of Caladan were inspired by medieval Japanese aesthetics, particularly that of Paul's training room, containing intricate screens and diffused lighting. Props were created by set decorator Richard Roberts, including custom-made furniture, lighting, textiles produced in Denmark, and other items designed to look antique.

The original design for the sandworm was deemed "prehistoric", inspired by whales with baleen in their mouths. The sandworm's skin texture was based on tree bark and mud flats. Vermette spoke of the challenges involved in creating the set designs used for the sandworms, stating "It was a creature that commanded respect, and it's almost seen as a deity in the world of the Fremen. So that's why the first time you see the depiction of the sand worm on the mural, it's presented with sun coming out of its mouth".

The design for Arrakeen was influenced by the book's description of Arrakis's climate, with Vermette calling it "the biggest residency ever built by humankind" and "a response as a colonial entity that took over the planet for the exploitation of ... spice". He designed the city in a "rock bowl" shape to protect its infrastructure from sandworms, and built buildings at an angle to protect them from high wind speeds. The walls were thickened to make the interiors cooler. The team was inspired by WWII bunkers, Mayan temples, and Brazilian modernism. The history and culture of the Fremen was depicted in various murals throughout the residence, with Vermette comparing it to that of a church after envisioning Fremen artists doing so in order to depict the colonization of Arrakis. One practical set was the environmental lab in which Sardaukar soldiers descend from the air. The circular dome was 20 feet high, with the spokes being created by a special kind of cloth fabric, giving the illusion of shadows and providing proper lighting for the act. Agriculturally controlled sand was placed on the ground as filming took place during Budapest's raining season.

==== Costumes ====
Over 1000 looks for Arrakis, Caladan, and Giedi Prime were designed by the team for the film. The costume design was done by Jacqueline West and Bob Morgan. Villeneuve wanted the costumes to be "grounded" in history while avoiding conventional futuristic views in science fiction films. West performed "psychological studies" of characters and historical research to associate their houses with historical "symbolic analogs", facilitating her costume design process. She took primary inspiration from the Middle Ages, particularly envisioning what it would look like in the future. She associated the Fremen with the French Resistance and the Sardaukar with the Nazis when designing the costumes. Additionally, she took inspiration from Giotto, Francisco Goya, Caravaggio, and British art historian John Berger, while emulating styles from the fashion of Balenciaga, the Bedouin, and Tuareg people.

West associated the Spacing Guild with the Avignon Papacy, connected their persecution of the Templars to that of House Atreides; she noted that the Emperor and his allies betrayed House Atreides. Reference pictures consisted of medieval popes and modernized it when designing their costumes. The Bene Gesserit sorceresses' costumes were based on tarot cards and chess pieces, while the Harkonnen armor was designed to resemble a bug's shell, using medieval drawings of "insects, spiders, ants, praying mantises and lizards" as reference. Meanwhile, the Atreides' costumes were based on the Romanovs, describing their costumes as having a "simplicity ... that was regal". Lady Jessica's dresses in the first half of the film were inspired by the works of Cristóbal Balenciaga, while the turmeric-toned gown she wears while landing on Arrakis was influenced by Middle Eastern clothing and paintings of women in North Africa.

West cited the films Lawrence of Arabia (1962), Doctor Zhivago (1965), and Fahrenheit 451 (1966) as further inspirations for costume diversity. She also researched Roman and Greek mythology, feeling that the Atreides-Harkonnen feud was similar to a "real Greek and Roman tragedy". She dyed the gauze for Fremen cloth in desert colors, inspired by the sand and rocks in Jordanian filming locations. A prototype for the stillsuit was designed by West and Jose Fernandez at Ironhead Studios in Los Angeles. The prototype was then taken to Origo Studios, where a factory was set up to design additional suits within two weeks. He hired European artisans to create concept designs and over 150 individual pieces for the suits. Over 250 stillsuits were used when filming in Jordan. The suits were designed to be flexible and comfortably fit the actor's body, while also remaining accurate to the book. They created "micro-sandwiches" of acrylic fibers and porous cottons, which absorbed the moisture and allowed the actors to remain cool inside the suits. Tubing also ran through the micro-sandwiches for increased flexibility. Zippers and buttons were not used as they were deemed "archaic".

=== Filming ===
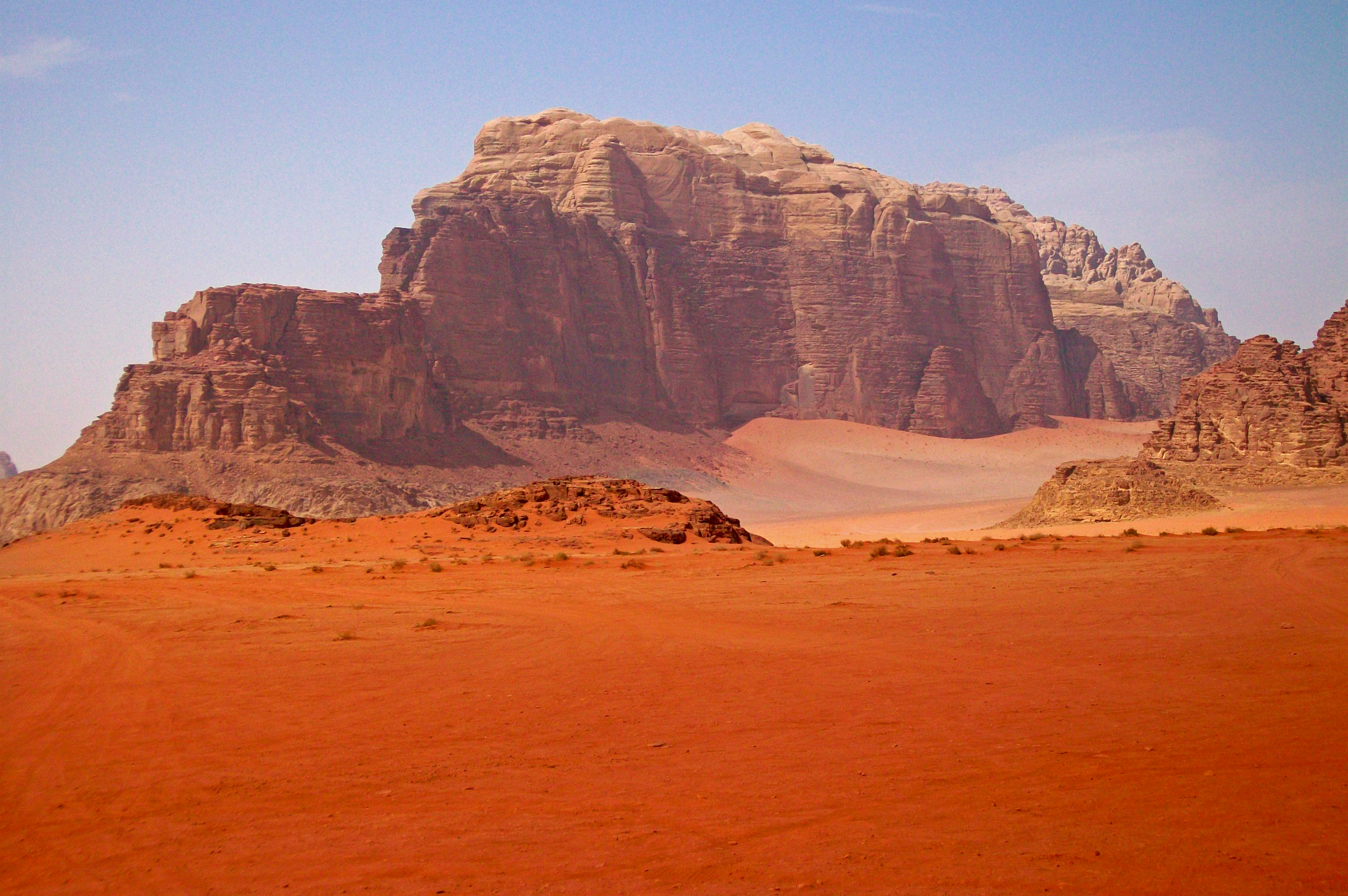
Wadi Rum in Jordan was used as a filming location as a double for the planet Arrakis

Principal photography began on March 18, 2019, at Origo Film Studios in Budapest, Hungary, with Greig Fraser serving as cinematographer. The film was shot for the IMAX format with an IMAX-certified Arri Alexa LF camera and an IMAX-certified Alexa Mini LF prototype, equipped with Panavision's large-format lenses in the Ultra Vista and H-series lineup. Select scenes had aspect ratios opened up to 1.90:1 on all IMAX screens, and to 1.43:1 on select IMAX screens outfitted with IMAX's dual-laser projection system. The finished footage was transferred to 35mm film stock, then scanned back to 4K, in order to achieve a more film-like look. Filming occurred in Wadi Rum, Jordan, which doubled for Arrakis. The Liwa Oasis in the United Arab Emirates also served as a key backdrop for Arrakis, with filming there occurring across 11 days. Local businesses, freelancers from Twofour54, and crews consisting of over 100 people offered assistance during the shoot. Scenes featuring the rock formations functioning as the Fremens' heat shelters were filmed at the Rub' al Khali desert. Stadlandet, Norway doubled for the planet Caladan. Filming wrapped on July 26, 2019. Additional filming took place in Budapest by August 2020, which did not alter the film's then-December 2020 release date.

Parts of the Arrakeen invasion, such as shots of Gurney, extras, and practical explosions up to approximately five kilometers high, were filmed on backlots in Budapest. Duke Leto's death scene was the final scene filmed by Isaac, in which he decided to film it nude as he felt it was similar to Christ's crucifixion. He also came up with the idea of including the bull's head, identifying it as an "omen". Ornithopter interiors were filmed on hilltops outside Budapest, with a 25-foot high and 360° sand-colored ramp circling a large gimbal, allowing Fraser to film with natural sunlight. Supervising stunt coordinator and second unit director Tom Struthers developed unique combat styles for major factions. When working on the action sequence between Idaho and the Sardaukars, he based Idaho's combat style from Greek and Roman warfare techniques, and the Sardaukar's from Russian soldiers in WWII wanting to "mow down the enemy". Chalamet learned the sandwalking technique, designed by choreographer Benjamin Millepied, prior to filming Arrakis scenes in order to convey Paul's natural adeptness at it and "responsibility to show Jessica in that moment". Footage of helicopters flying over the UAE were filmed with six high-resolution cameras, being used as reference footage for ornithopters.

=== Visual effects and design ===
"Sandscreens" were used to simulate the natural luminance of the desert intended for backgrounds.

DNEG contributed to over 30 scenes in the film, creating 1,200 VFX shots out of the 1,700 total, with vendors including Wylie Co. and Rodeo FX. Many shots used various chroma key processes. Visual effects supervisor Paul Lambert used "sandscreens" for filming scenes in Arrakis and Arrakeen; instead of using green-based backgrounds, the visual effects team used sand-colored ones that matched the establishing desert shots intended for backgrounds. The sandscreens were used in capturing scenes of the ornithopter, with the VFX team using the helicopter footage and replacing it with the ornithopter models, facilitating capture of sand displacement. This was also filmed by encapsulating ornithopter models in black boxes with fans blowing dust. The wings were inserted using computer-generated imagery (CGI). Similar processes were used to film scenes in other settings, as it facilitated compositing the foreground and background imagery: Caladan scenes used "grayscreens" and those with a "slight blue tint" for interior and exterior scenes, respectively, Salusa Secundus scenes used bluescreens. Approximately 18 tons of sand and dust were used on set, with the effect of blowing sand being created by using a V8 engine with a fan on the back of a tractor.

The sandworms were created through CGI. The VFX team found a lot of difficulty in deciding how the sandworm would move. The team spent over a year in figuring out the movements of the sandworm, and researched the body movements of various animals, such as worms and snakes. The sand ripples created by the worms were inspired by implicit visual cues of the shark from Jaws (1975). The special-effects supervisor Gerd Nefzer designed a vibrating 8x8 foot steel plate and placed it under the sand. This resulted in the formation of various patterns, used to signify an approaching sandworm. The vibrating areas were also later enhanced to cover a larger area. The team initially considered using rigged explosives to capture the motion of the sandworms breaking the surface in the desert, but rejected the idea as this was impractical to perform in the Middle East. Instead, they used the Houdini software to have sand emulate the motion of water. Villeneuve did not want the associated sound design to appear as a studio production. Sound designers Mark Mangini and Theo Green used a "fake documentary realism" approach to capture natural sounds and manipulate them for use in the film, such as recording the sounds of shifting sands in Death Valley using hydrophones.

The Montreal and Vancouver facilities of DNEG were used for the Arrakeen invasion sequence. It involved combining practical and visual effects. The Montreal VFX supervisor, Brian Connor created a digital Arrakeen space port, while the Vancouver team simulated explosions. Practical explosions filmed in Budapest backlots were later enhanced by the VFX team: the visual effects team had rigs of practical light shining through the fog from explosions, allowing them to blend practical and digital shots easier. Lambert created the Holtzman shields' visual effects by combining past and future frames after experimenting with various visual filters on an action sequence from Seven Samurai (1954), resulting in a "shimmering" look Villeneuve approved. They also added colors; they used blue for bouncing objects and red for penetrations. The scene of Paul's future vision was filmed using motion-capture (mo-cap), and the team replicated mo-cap to add many fighters. Animation supervisor Robyn Luckham helped with the scene as the team did not know much about mo-cap. They also added explosions in the foreground, sandworms in the background, sand displacement throughout, and used more simulations to render the scene in real-time.

The team created a detailed practical stuffy model for the desert mouse and filmed it in Jordan for appropriate desert lighting. The animation team used footage of idling animals as reference, and animated the mouse so it "expends effort when absolutely necessary". The creosote bush hologram was created by projecting different "slices" of light on Chalamet's face during plate photography based on his filming location using a projector. Wylie then completed the scene by adding the hologram around him. For the hunter-seeker, a stick on set was used as reference, being later replaced with proper models via CGI. Practical rigs were attached to Skarsgård's body to create the effect of the Baron's levitation. The levitation was occasionally done practically with a seesaw rig. However, the suspensor device attached to his back was inserted using CGI.

== Music ==
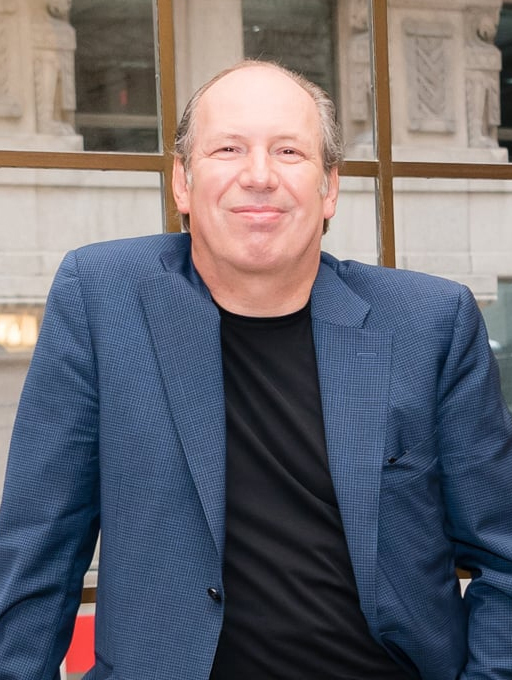
Hans Zimmer composed the film's score.

Hans Zimmer affirmed he would be scoring Dune near the start of the film's production in March 2019. Zimmer previously collaborated with Villeneuve on Blade Runner 2049 (2017). At the time, Zimmer rejected director Christopher Nolan's request to compose the score for his then-upcoming film Tenet (2020), citing his personal love for the book. Zimmer did not want the soundtrack to sound like his previous works and used instruments atypical of a Western orchestra. He avoided watching Lynch's Dune so as not to be influenced by Toto's music, instead spending a week in a Utah desert to incorporate its sounds into the score. The music was performed using an eclectic set of instruments, including some created specifically for the soundtrack. Performers for the score include guitarist Guthrie Govan and vocalist Loire Cotler. Additional music was composed by Steve Mazzaro and David Fleming, both of whom worked in collaboration with Zimmer to keep his pieces on theme. The soundtrack pieces include bagpipes for the House Atreides theme, which was suggested as Villeneuve's idea of something "ancient and organic". Zimmer found 30 bagpipe players around Edinburgh during the COVID-19 pandemic and recorded them playing in a church.

For the first Dune trailer, Zimmer supervised a 32-person choir via FaceTime (necessitated by pandemic restrictions) for the recording of a cover of Pink Floyd's song "Eclipse". Choir members gathered in groups of four over eight separate sessions in Santa Monica at Zimmer's Remote Control studio while Zimmer conducted from home.

Three soundtrack albums were released for the film by WaterTower Music, including The Dune Sketchbook (Music from the Soundtrack), Dune (Original Motion Picture Soundtrack), and The Art and Soul of Dune on September 3, September 17, and October 22, 2021, respectively. Villeneuve said Zimmer spent "months and months creating new instruments, defining, creating, and seeking new sounds, pushing the envelope" and praised his work on the film. Two singles were released on July 22, titled "Paul's Dream" and "Ripples in the Sand". The film's score was nominated for the Best Score Soundtrack for Visual Media at the 2022 Grammy Awards, and later won the Academy Award for Best Original Score at the 94th Academy Awards.

== Marketing ==
In April 2020, Vanity Fair published a two-part extensive first-look report on Dune. Empire provided additional first looks in October ahead of the film's trailer release. A teaser trailer was released on September 9 featuring a remix of the Pink Floyd song "Eclipse" (1973) combined with Zimmer's score. Zack Sharf of IndieWire gave the trailer a positive review, and wrote "It's full of eye-popping set design", in addition to stating, "The two [Denis Villeneuve and Greig Fraser] have brought a tangibility to Frank Herbert's world that should make Dune a visceral experience for moviegoers." Miles Surrey from The Ringer also gave the trailer a positive review, and felt the trailer "undoubtedly looks promising," and noted that, though the source material has been "notoriously unadaptable," he felt "the curse could be broken," due to the cast and Villeneuve's direction. Similarly, Deadline Hollywood's Dino-Ray Ramos also praised the trailer for its scale, writing that it contained "sci-fi prestige and the epic scale that includes mind-boggling action, elegant cinematography and fantastical nuances that still leave room for grounded and very human storytelling".

The first ten minutes of the film were screened in select IMAX theaters worldwide on July 21 and 22, 2021, in an event that also included a behind-the-scenes look at the film and the debut of the film's theatrical trailer, on July 22. Angela Wattercutter of Wired stated that the trailer "is begging you to see it in theaters". Jennifer Yuma from Variety praised the cast and visuals, and praised its scope, calling the trailer "epic". Similarly, Aaron Couch from The Hollywood Reporter also praised the cast and thought the film was an "ambitious sci-fi adaptation". Anthony Breznican from Vanity Fair also gave the trailer a positive review and stated, "It will seem more mysterious to those unfamiliar with the story, but like Chani does herself in those dream missives to Paul, it hints at big, impressive things to come". Vulture's Zoe Haylock was also impressed by the trailer, and advocated watching the film in theaters, praising the visuals as "transcendental natural settings". Writing for Entertainment Weekly, Christian Holub felt the trailer "sets the stage cleanly".

On February 26, 2019, Funcom entered into an exclusive partnership with Legendary Entertainment to develop games related to the upcoming Dune films. An artbook, The Art and Soul of Dune, was released alongside the film on October 22, 2021. The book was written by the executive producer Tanya Lapointe, and it included a soundtrack album of the same name composed by Zimmer. The book was available in both a standard and deluxe edition. In September 2020, McFarlane Toys started a line of 7-inch figures modeled after characters from the film. A 12-inch figure of Baron Harkonnen was introduced at the same time. The action figures were released in December 2020. Legendary Comics announced Dune: The Official Movie Graphic Novel via Kickstarter and published the comic in December 2022 by writer Lilah Sturges and art by Drew Johnson.

== Release ==
=== Theatrical and streaming ===
Dune was originally scheduled to be released on November 20, 2020, but was pushed back to December 18, 2020. The film was then delayed by the COVID-19 pandemic, this time to October 1, 2021, taking over the release date slot of The Batman, where it was theatrically released in 3D. In late June 2021, Warner Bros. delayed the film's American release date again by three weeks to October 22, 2021, to avoid competition with No Time to Die. Over a month prior to its North American release, the film began its theatrical roll-out in most international markets, beginning on September 15 with France, Germany, Russia, Switzerland, Sweden, Norway, Spain and Belgium. A week ahead of the United States release, Warner Bros. announced that the film's availability on HBO Max would start on the evening of October 21, 2021, correlating with typical early Thursday theatrical showings for films released on Fridays (although the studio had not been doing early Thursday previews for most of the rest of their hybrid theatrical/HBO Max releases. The other exception being The Suicide Squad, which had the same strategy for its early Thursday previews/HBO Max release).

Like all 2021 Warner Bros. films, Dune was streamed simultaneously on HBO Max for a period of one month. The film was then removed from the service and followed the normal home media release schedule, similar to the process Warner Bros. used for Wonder Woman 1984 (2020). Many production companies and directors expressed dissatisfaction with the decision, including Villeneuve and Legendary Pictures. In a column published in Variety, Villeneuve expressed concerns about the film's financial success and piracy.

Dune had its world premiere at the 78th Venice International Film Festival on September 3, 2021. It also screened at the Toronto International Film Festival with an IMAX premiere screening at the Ontario Place Cinesphere on September 11, 2021. Jason Momoa tested positive for COVID-19 after attending the film's London premiere on October 15, 2021. On October 17, the film was leaked online ahead of its planned US and HBO Max release. The film returned for a theatrical run at IMAX theaters from December 3, 2021. From January 24, 2024, screenings included an exclusive preview of Dune: Part Two ahead of its March 2024 release.

=== Home media ===
The film was released digitally on December 3, 2021, while Blu-ray, 3D Blu-ray, DVD and Ultra HD Blu-ray versions of the film were released on January 11, 2022, by Warner Bros. Home Entertainment. After its release on home media, Dune ranked first on the "NPD VideoScan First Alert" chart for combined Blu-ray and DVD sales as well as the dedicated Blu-ray sales chart. According to The Numbers, it sold a combined 215,375 Blu-ray and DVD units in the first week for $3.6 million. It retained the top position on both the charts of the NPD Group for the following two weeks before being displaced by Ghostbusters: Afterlife. In addition, it was the most rented title from Redbox kiosks for three weeks as well. It was the highest-selling movie for the month of January according to the "NPD VideoScan First Alert" chart.

== Reception ==
=== Box office ===
Dune grossed $109 million in the United States and Canada, and $302 million in other territories, for a worldwide total of $411 million. Deadline Hollywood reported that a total box office gross of $300 million, the combined cost of production and marketing, "will make many happy from an image-standpoint, even if breakeven is far north of that". Vulture said the film needed $350–400 million to reach its break-even point, while Forbes said it required "somewhere around $500 million" to do so.

In the US and Canada, the film made $41 million in its opening weekend from 4,125 theaters, surpassing its projected opening weekend estimates of $30–35 million and besting the debut of Godzilla vs. Kong ($31.6 million) for the highest opening weekend for Warner Bros. during the pandemic era. Of that opening weekend take, $17.5 million came from its first day ticket sales, including $5.1 million from Thursday night previews. Dune also had the best opening of Villeneuve's career. The film fell 62% in its second weekend to $15.5 million, though it remained atop the domestic box office. In its third weekend it dropped by 51% to earn $7.6 million, and was displaced by Eternals from the top rank. On November 25, 2021, Dune became the second Warner Bros. film of the pandemic era to cross $100 million in the US and Canada, following Godzilla vs. Kong.

The film was released in 14 markets outside the US and Canada on September 15, 2021. It grossed $37.9 million, with the largest markets being Russia and CIS ($8.9 million), France ($7.2 million), Germany ($4.4 million), Taiwan ($3.4 million), Italy ($2.5 million) and Spain ($2.4 million). After adding an additional $26.3 million from 32 countries in its second weekend, the film had a 10-day running total of $76.5 million.

In China, Dune opened to a $21.6 million weekend according to estimates by Warner Brothers, ranking second on the country's box office behind The Battle at Lake Changjin. In its fourth week of release outside the US and Canada, the film made $21.4 million in 75 countries, a drop of 54% from the previous weekend. It also fell by 78% to about $5 million in China, dropping to the third rank. The film crossed the $300 million global mark on November 2. During the fifth weekend it earned $11.1 million, a drop of 52%. This included $2.1 million in China where it dropped to the fifth rank.

After its return to IMAX for a week on December 2, the film earned an estimated $1.8 million during the weekend, a drop of 13% from the previous weekend, primarily due to earning around $1 million from IMAX. In Australia it debuted atop the box office chart, earning $3.4 million in the opening weekend. The $400 million global mark was crossed on February 14, 2022, with the largest running-total countries outside the US and Canada being China ($39.5 million), France ($32.6 million), the UK ($30 million), Germany ($22.5 million) and Russia ($21.3 million).

=== Streaming viewership ===
According to Samba TV, the film was watched in over 1.9 million US households during its first three days of release, which grew to 2.3 million within its first week of release. 3.9 million US households watched the film within its first 30 days of release. According to TV Time, it was the most-watched film overall in the United States from the first to the third week of its release consecutively, before dropping to the sixth rank in its fourth week. The film rose to the third rank on TV Time's chart in the final week of its availability. It was the ninth-most-streamed-film of 2021 according to the service. By March 20, the film was streamed in 5.3 million households in the US, including 996,000 since the Oscar nomination announcements on February 8.

After its release on PVOD services, Dune debuted at the second position on iTunes and Vudu charts and was ranked seventh on Google Play. The following week it fell to the seventh position on iTunes and the third position on Vudu, while maintaining its ranking on Google Play. After falling out of the charts for two weeks, it found renewed interest as it rose to the tenth position on iTunes, seventh position on Google Play, and the fifth position on Vudu. In the following week, it fell out of the iTunes and Google Play charts again, while dropping to the tenth position on the Vudu chart.

The film was the highest-selling title on Redbox's digital service for the week of January 24–30, 2022. It was also the top-ranked film on iTunes during the same week. Following the Academy Awards nominations, it reentered the top 10 charts for iTunes, Google Play and Vudu.

=== Critical response ===
On the review aggregator website Rotten Tomatoes, 83% of 512 critics' reviews are positive, with an average rating of 7.7/10. The website's consensus reads: "Dune occasionally struggles with its unwieldy source material, but those issues are largely overshadowed by the scope and ambition of this visually thrilling adaptation." Metacritic gave the film a weighted average score of 74 out of 100, based on 68 critics, indicating "generally favorable" reviews. Audiences polled by CinemaScore gave the film an average grade of "A−" on an A+ to F scale, while those at PostTrak gave it an 84% positive score, with 66% of viewers saying they would definitely recommend it. Following the film's premiere at the Venice Film Festival in September 2021, early reception was generally positive. Dune received praise for its ambition, story, scope, worldbuilding, performances—particularly those of Chalamet and Ferguson—and production value, although some critics considered the story to be incomplete and dull. Its writing and scope continued to be praised following its release, while some criticized the runtime, pacing, and adaptation of the source material.

Ben Travis of Empire praised the writing and direction, feeling it helped properly establish elements of worldbuilding. He also lauded Fraser's cinematography and Zimmer's score, calling the film "blockbuster filmmaking in the Christopher Nolan mould", and praising Chalamet and Ferguson's performances. However, he felt that the "emotional strings" did not work as well. Xan Brooks of The Guardian described the film as high-quality and called it "the missing link bridging the multiplex and the arthouse", citing the worldbuilding, ensemble cast, and set pieces as positive elements. Robbie Collin of The Daily Telegraph praised the writing and Chalamet and Ferguson's performances, feeling the exposition was written well.

Justin Chang of the Los Angeles Times praised the film's production value and its use of thematic elements from the novel, while describing its overall aesthetic as monochromatic. He lauded the role of women in the story and the directing of the action sequences, although he disliked the "abrupt, unsatisfying" ending. Leah Greenblatt of Entertainment Weekly appreciated the worldbuilding and aesthetics of Dune as well as the performances of Chalamet and Isaac, but thought the film had insufficient exposition. Writing for The New York Times, Manohla Dargis also admired the production value and worldbuilding, although she criticized the ending, describing it as a "white man leading a fateful charge".

Owen Gleiberman of Variety appreciated the film's extensive worldbuilding but felt the spectacles, such as the sandworm and ornithopter sequences, distract from the story. Writing for TheWrap, Steve Pond praised the production design, action sequences and "mystical elements", calling Dune a "giant mood piece that can be exhilarating in its dark beauty". Roxana Hadadi of Vulture criticized the way the film flattened the cultural and religious complexities of the novel and failed to include Middle Eastern or North African (MENA) actors. In June 2025, cinematographer Jomo Fray cited Dune as among his favorite films of the 21st century. The film ranked number 99 on Time Out's list of the "100 Best Sci-Fi Movies of All Time."

=== Accolades ===
Dune was nominated for ten Academy Awards (winning six), three Golden Globe Awards (winning one), eleven British Academy Film Awards (winning five), ten Critics' Choice Movie Awards (winning three), two AACTA International Awards (winning one), ten Satellite Awards (winning five), one Grammy Award, one Hollywood Music in Media Awards (won), four People's Choice Awards, one Screen Actors Guild Awards, three Dorian Awards (winning one), and one Nickelodeon Kids' Choice Award (won), one MovieGuide Award (won), among others. It was also ranked as one of the top ten films of 2021 by the American Film Institute.

== Analysis ==
Kara Kennedy concluded that some parts are very faithful to the source material while others are heavily adjusted, such as the opening of the story and the portrayal of the Harkonnen. Frank Jacob found that the film has a stronger Orientalization of the Fremen than Lynch's film adaptation, shown through elements such as Chani appearing like the Afghan Girl on the cover of National Geographic in 1985. Edwardo Pérez explored the depiction of the Fremen, masculinity and femininity, and issues of cultural appropriation in the film. He perceived Paul's "feminine" Bene Gesserit skills and "masculine" military training as contributing to his initial "androgynous" and timid nature, later becoming masculine after killing Jamis. According to him, this alongside Duke Leto's sympathy during Paul's concerns about being leader showed that one must acknowledge their masculine and feminine nature for success by pursuing leadership passively.

Yosr Dridi found screenplay changes made to adjust the source material for a "culturally-aware and race-conscious 21st century audience" as eliminating the Arab and Oriental elements for the story, and focusing more on Fremen culture and society rather than the elements of geopolitical worldbuilding from the book, noting how Princess Irulan's original historical epigraphs in the book being replaced with Chani's narration. However, Dridi stated that the film framed Fremen society through Paul's perspective, which constrained the Oriental in "dominating frameworks" and disliking the usage of few Arabic words from the Fremen lexicon in the film. Misha Grifka Wander has shown how the film downplays ecology and elements from MENA cultures in favor of the chosen one storytelling trope. Doru Pop discussed the controversies and changes made in the adaptation of Dune to film and Isaac Asimov's Foundation to a television series, particularly the gender and racial changes to key characters. Ion Indolean looked at how Villeneuve cinematographically expresses the story of Paul using elements of the space opera genre and follows in the steps of director Ridley Scott in Blade Runner (1982) and Alien (1979). Villeneuve has talked about how his Dune films were strongly influenced by David Lean's Lawrence of Arabia.

Other commentators and academics also perceived the film to have neglected and appropriated Arabian and Islamic elements which influenced Dune, and to have excluded MENA actors. Serena Rasoul, founder of Muslim Casting, wanted more MENA representation and labelled the lack of MENA actors an "erasure". She also acknowledged the cast's overall diversity and did not call the film Orientalist. Ph.D. student in history at Princeton University Haris Durrari deemed it to be Orientalist as he opined it reduced Arab influences to "exotic aesthetics" and "broad abstractions". Meanwhile, Ali Karjoo-Ravary, an assistant professor of Islamic Studies at Bucknell University, felt that the casting of African actors excluded MENA actors, and that characters portrayed by African people felt "ultimately empty" as they had died or were not as developed as Paul and Lady Jessica.

== Sequels and spin-offs ==
In June 2019, Legendary Television announced that it would produce a spin-off series, Dune: The Sisterhood, for WarnerMedia's streaming service, HBO Max. The series serves as a prequel to the film and centers on the Bene Gesserit. Initially, Villeneuve was to direct the series' pilot, with Jon Spaihts writing the screenplay and Dana Calvo as showrunner for the series. In November 2019, Spaihts left the series as writer to focus on writing the sequel film. In July 2021, Diane Ademu-John took over as showrunner. The series was retitled Dune: Prophecy in November 2023 and premiered on HBO on 17 November 2024 to mostly positive reviews. The series was renewed for a second season in December 2024.

Villeneuve intended to make a two-part adaptation of the novel, but felt that Warner Bros.' decision in December 2020 to simultaneously release their 2021 films through HBO Max alongside a theatrical release due to the impact of the COVID-19 pandemic on cinema could compromise the film's financial performance. This resulted in the cancellation of the sequel, though Warner Bros. assured him a sequel would be greenlit as long as the film performed well on HBO Max.

Following the film's success, Warner Bros. and Legendary Pictures officially greenlit Dune: Part Two in October 2021. Villeneuve's main concern was to finish the production, which would benefit from all the work on the first part. Main characters reprise their role from the first film, with additional casting lasting from March to July 2022, and concluding by January 2023. Preliminary filming began in Italy by early July 2022, and concluded that December. The film was released on March 1, 2024. Dune: Part Two's world premiere took place at Odeon Luxe Leicester Square in London on February 15.

Villeneuve expressed interest in making a third film based on Dune Messiah, the second novel in the series, adding that the possibility for the film depended on the success of Dune: Part Two. Spaihts also reiterated in March 2022 that Villeneuve had plans for a third film as well as for Dune: Prophecy. In August 2023, Villeneuve declared his intentions for the film to serve as the conclusion of his Dune trilogy. Villeneuve began developing a script by 2023. In February 2024, Villeneuve said the script was "almost finished" but also wanted to take time to ensure his satisfaction, citing Hollywood's tendency of focusing on release dates over quality. Ahead of Dune: Part Two's release, Hans Zimmer revealed he was already writing music for a third film. Dune: Part Three is scheduled for theatrical release in the United States on December 18, 2026.

== See also ==
- List of films split into multiple parts
