= Kevin Lin =

Kevin Lin may refer to:

- Kevin Lin (athlete) (born 1976), Taiwanese athlete and academic
- Kevin Lin (entrepreneur) (born 1982), American entrepreneur and co-founder of Twitch
