= Bing Chen =

American entrepreneur

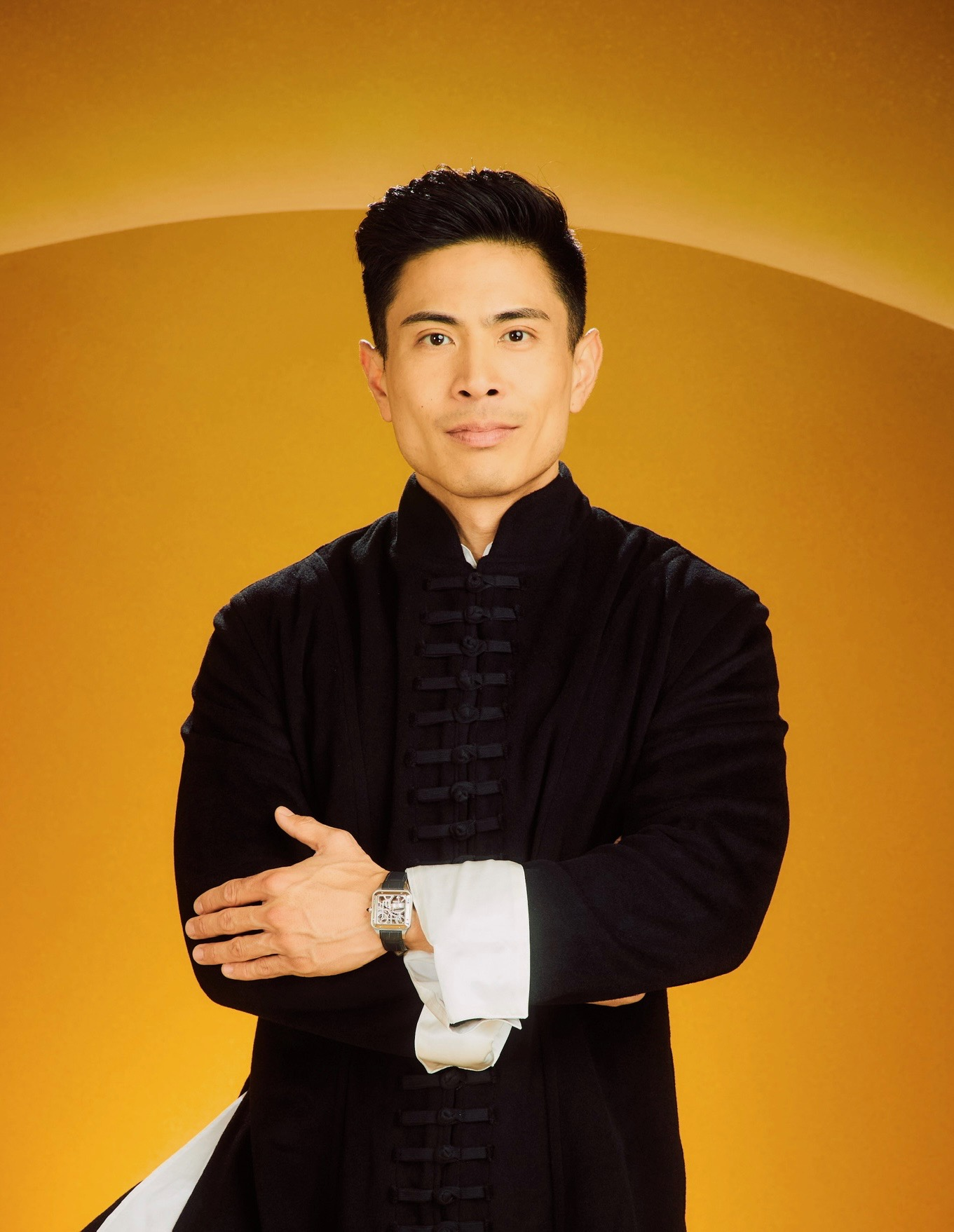
- Chen at Gold Gala
- Born: Knoxville, Tennessee
- Education: University of Pennsylvania (BA)
- Occupation: Entrepreneur
- Known for: Gold House

Bing Chen is an American entrepreneur of Taiwanese descent. A former executive at YouTube where he is recognized for being one of the early creator economy architects, he co-founded Gold House, a holding company seeking to reshape Asian culture through community-building, investment, and promotion where he currently serves as its CEO and executive chairman.

In 2014, Chen was named to the Forbes 30 Under 30. In 2019, he was named among the "50 Agents of Change Empowering Diverse Voices in Hollywood" by The Hollywood Reporter. In 2021, he was nominated to GMA's inspiration list of "Who is Making Asian American Pacific Islander History." In 2022, he was inducted into the American Advertising Federation's Advertising Hall of Achievement and received its Jack Averett Volunteer Spirit Award for industry service. He is also a Google Multicultural Champion, a Los Angeles Times Most Influential Leader, an ADCOLOR Catalyst Honoree, and in 2025, he was named a World Economic Forum Young Global Leader and an Elevate Prize honoree.

== Early life ==
Chen was born in Knoxville, Tennessee to Taiwanese immigrants. His family then moved to Shanghai, China and subsequently back to the United States, in Orange County, California. He attended the University of Pennsylvania and graduated with a degree in creative writing, psychology, and marketing.

== Career ==
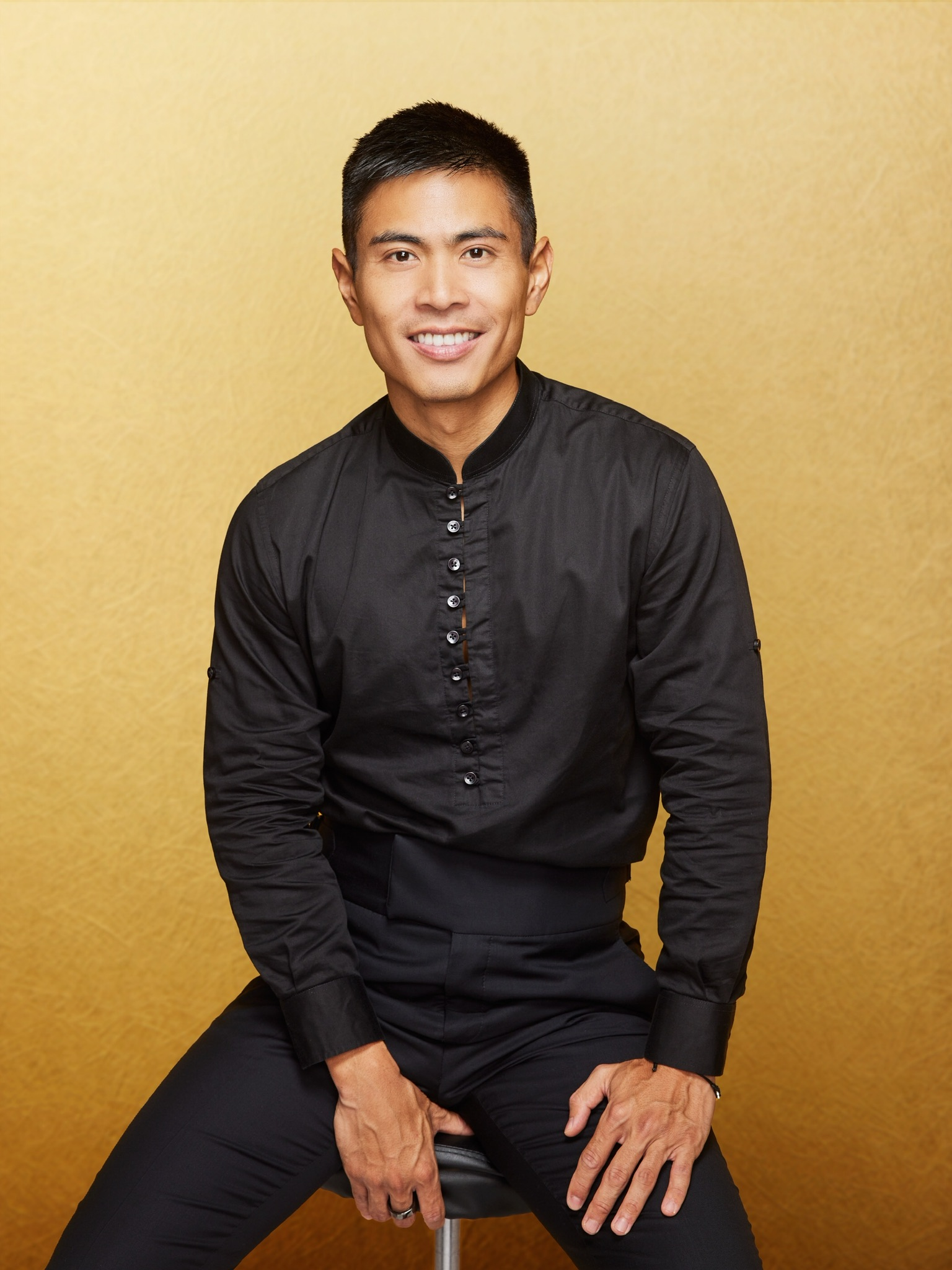
Bing Chen

Early in his career, Chen worked at Google as a product marketing manager. Afterward, he moved to YouTube. As its global head of creator development and management, Chen built the platform's foundational creator ecosystem by establishing its creator hub, expanding its partner program globally, and creating initiatives to nurture its upcoming talent such as the NextUp accelerator, YouTube University, global support system, and major events like VidCon. He also launched Play Buttons as a way of celebrating channel subscriber milestones.

In 2018, Chen founded Gold House with Twitch co-founder Kevin Lin. An organization seeking to empower and support the Asian diaspora and its culture, it focuses on "the lack of intrinsic unity within the Asian diaspora; the media’s portrayal of Asians; the fact that Asians are the least likely demographic to be promoted in corporate management; and a lack of interest among Asians in voting, despite representing the fastest-growing bloc in several U.S. swing states." Through Gold House, he also launched Gold House Studios, which purports to focus on "developing and producing original and IP-driven stories across film, television, and digital media," though it has also been criticized as reinforcing and promoting Hollywood's fetish dynamic.

In 2020, Chen co-founded Aum Group, "a fund dedicated to acquiring and developing IP and financing multicultural movies," along with Lin and several other co-founders like Nina Yang Bongiovi. He also has a personal investment firm called AU Holdings, is a Young Presidents' Organization member, and a Milken Young Leaders Circle member.

In his philanthropic work, Chen serves on the boards of directors of the Asia Society and the Coalition of Asian Pacifics in Entertainment (CAPE), nonprofit organizations focused on fostering cross-cultural understanding and advancing Asian Pacific representation in media and society. In 2023, Chen joined the advisory board of VidCon, the online video industry's largest creator convention, which he helped develop during his tenure at YouTube. In 2024, Chen joined the board of directors of the Banff Television Festival Foundation.

== Personal life ==
Chen is bisexual.
