= Gold House =

Leadership organization for Asians and Pacific Islanders

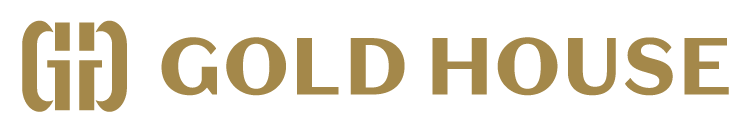
- Formation: 2018; 8 years ago
- Type: 501(c)(3) organization
- Headquarters: Los Angeles, California
- Region served: U.S.
- Executive Chairman & CEO: Bing Chen
- Executive Director & COO: Jeremy Tran
- Website: https://goldhouse.org

Gold House is a non-profit organization based in Los Angeles, New York, San Francisco, and Singapore that promotes the interests of people of Asian and Pacific Islander descent. The collective consists of founders, creators, investors, entertainers, thinkers and other leaders with the goal of highlighting each other's work, investing in both content and companies, and changing perceptions about the impact of the Asian Pacific diaspora within and across multicultural communities. According to the organization's website, the strategy is to "forge meaningful bonds across professional, familial, and community life, and leverage those relationships to elevate the Asian Pacific diaspora's authentic societal representation and economic success."

== History ==
Gold House was founded by former YouTube executive and entrepreneur Bing Chen in 2018 in an effort to strengthen and uplift the API community. Chen, who holds the role of executive chairman and CEO of Gold House, wanted to combat hate and affliction with information by changing the narrative and promoting the impact of Asian Americans. To that end, he created the A100 list which is released annually and includes the 100 Asian Pacific leaders that made the greatest impact on culture and society across a range of industries and professions. Those honored multiple times will eventually make it into the A100 Hall of Fame.

Throughout the years, Gold House offered a variety of venues for showcasing the diverse skills and life stories of API people through a number of different programs and built the largest Asian leadership network in America, and in Fall 2023, Gold House expanded to Asia with Singapore serving as entry point to the rest of Asia.

== Activities ==
=== Gold Open ===
According to Bing Chen, Gold House had two initial missions to work on as a starting point. The first one was trying to address the misconceptions in the media involving the sexualization of Asian women and emasculation of Asian men that in some cases, can result in deleterious treatment and anti-Asian hate crimes. Gold House is working as cultural consultant on the accuracy of scenes, products and characters on major films and creative projects. The organization's #GoldOpen project helped secure theater buyouts, global distribution and media campaigns for films like Parasite, Crazy Rich Asians, and The Farewell, and in January 2021, #GoldOpen released its first Gold List in collaboration with the Coalition of Asian Pacifics in Entertainment (CAPE) to celebrate the most outstanding Asian and Pacific Islander (API) achievements in film.

In February 2024, Gold House hosted its first "Oscars One Night Toast" in collaboration with GLAAD, the NAACP Hollywood Bureau, La Cena, IllumiNative, Harness, Pillars Fund, The Blackhouse Foundation, The Female Quotient, and The Latinx House. The inaugural event celebrated the achievements of the 2024 multicultural nominees in filmmaking.

=== Gold Rush ===
The second issue that Gold House wanted to address initially was helping Asian Americans in the corporate world break through to upper management, and the organization created an initiative called "Gold Rush", a startup-accelerator that connected smaller Asian-led companies with AAPI venture capitalists and entrepreneurs in a rigorous 12-week program.

=== Gold Gala ===
Gold House held their inaugural Gold Gala at the Vibiana in Los Angeles in May 2022 to honor Asian representation from the year gone by. Guests included names from the film and television industry such as Mindy Kaling, Henry Golding, Michelle Yeoh and Simu Liu, snowboarder Chloe Kim, designers Prabal Gurung and Phillip Lim, and Boston mayor Michelle Wu. In May 2023, the first A100 celebratory weekend took place with the A100 Welcome Reception at Creative Artists Agency (CAA) in Century City followed by industry-specific Salons, culminating in the second annual Gold Gala attended by Brie Larson, Harry Shum Jr., Destin Daniel Cretton, Eva Longoria, the cast of Queer Eye, Lea Salonga, and more. The third annual Gold Gala that took place in May 2024 was attended by content creator Valkyrae, actor John Cho, actresses Lucy Liu and Regina King, singer and songwriter Cynthia Erivo, directors Jon M. Chu and Lulu Wang, actors Gordon Cormier, Dallas Liu, Ian Ousley, and Elizabeth Yu from the live-action series Avatar: The Last Airbender, Olympic champions Kristi Yamaguchi, Chloe Kim, Nathan Chen, HYBE chairman Bang Si-Hyuk and more.

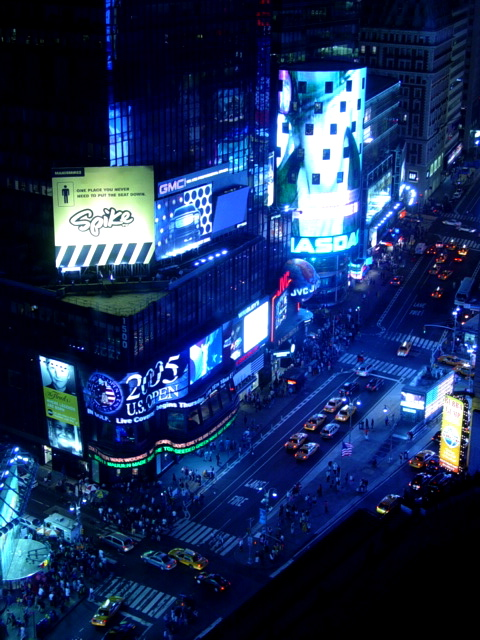
Nasdaq stock exchange

=== Gold House Ventures ===
In April 2022, Gold House expanded on their startup accelerator and established Gold House Ventures, the organization's first venture fund, and announced the launch of a $30 million fund to boost API leadership in the corporate world by supporting and promoting Asian American entrepreneurs. The fund's investors include venture capital firms Lightspeed, NEA, Bain Capital and General Catalyst, along with philanthropies like the Chan Zuckerberg Initiative. Its individual investors include DoorDash CEO Tony Xu, Block CFO Amrita Ahuja and YouTube co-founder Steve Chen, along with celebrities like rapper Anderson .Paak, two-time Olympic figure skating champion Nathan Chen, TV host and producer Padma Lakshmi, and actor Daniel Dae Kim.

On May 2, 2023, Gold House rang the opening bell at the Nasdaq stock exchange. The delegation included Bing Chen, Nathan Chen, Sehr Thadhani (Chief Digital Officer, Nasdaq), Kinjil Mathur (Chief Marketing Officer, Squarespace), and R'Bonney Gabriel (Miss USA 2022 and Miss Universe 2022).

=== Gold Bridge ===
Gold House expanded to Asia via Singapore in September 2023 and referred to this phase as "Gold Bridge" that focused on strengthening ties between communities, industries and continents. Head of Platform Oscar Wong described Singapore as a burgeoning hotspot for entrepreneurs and businesses looking to grow and envisioned it developing into the "next Silicon Valley of Asia" and a hub for talent.

== A100 / Gold100 ==
The inaugural A100 list in 2018 included "Crazy Rich Asians" director Jon M. Chu, Twitch co-founder Kevin Lin, Anu Duggal & Sutian Dong, partners at the Female Founders Fund. In 2019, Awkwafina and Sandra Oh, BTS, Hasan Minhaj, Albert Cheng, Kamala Harris and Nathan Chen were among the honorees. The third annual list in 2020 featured Allure editor in chief Michelle Lee, Vanity Fair editor in chief Radhika Jones, Lana Condor, Chrissy Teigen, Lilly Singh, Dwayne Johnson, Blackpink and others. In 2021, tennis player Naomi Osaka, actors Daniel Dae Kim, Maitreyi Ramakrishnan and Auli’i Cravalho, director Chloé Zhao and others appeared on the list. Gold House named Simu Liu, Olivia Rodrigo, Mindy Kaling, HoYeon Jung, Bowen Yang and more to its 2022 list of A100 honorees. The 2023 list included Shohei Ohtani, Geena Rocero, Neal Mohan and Bela Bajaria, with the cast of Everything Everywhere All At Once receiving a "golden icon award" and Ke Huy Quan getting a "special leading man award".

In 2026, the list was rebranded as the Gold100, with new honorees including the music group Katseye, singer Lola Young, and actors Ishaan Khatter and Hudson Williams.

A100 Hall of Famers include Jon M. Chu, Sandra Oh, Kamala Harris, Nathan Chen, Naomi Osaka, Michelle Yeoh, Mindy Kaling, Phillip Lim, Dwayne Johnson, Chrissy Teigen, Lisa Ling, Dan Lin and more.
