= Muslim Casting =

American casting and consulting company

Muslim Casting is an American casting and consulting company that seeks to promote Muslim representation and visibility in Hollywood. Founded by Serena Rasoul in January 2021, the company helps productions portray Muslims accurately through DEI consulting. Muslim Casting has been featured in various news outlets such as Variety, NPR, Backstage, The Washington Post, and NBC News.

In March 2022, the company, in partnership with the Geena Davis Institute on Gender in Media, Pillars Fund, and Muslim Girl, launched an on-screen test specifically for Muslim women, inspired by the Bechdel test. The test suggests ways for a Muslim woman to approach her identity in a variety of ways, allowing her to evaluate aspects of herself while avoiding oppressive Western stereotypes. It also looks at the intersectionality and diversity of Muslim women of all ethnicities, abilities, and sexual orientations who exist. The test also shows how a Muslim woman can be depicted as joyful, which is often seen as a form of resistance by many marginalized communities.
