= M. A. Muqtedar Khan =

Indian academic (born 1966)

Mohammed Abdul Muqtedar Khan
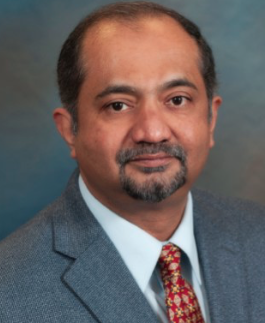
- Born: 1966 (age 59–60); Hyderabad, India
- Education: Georgetown University
- Occupation: Academic
- Website: ijtihad.org/muqtedarkhan

Muhammad Abdul Muqtedar Khan (born 1966) is an Indian American academic and a professor in the Department of Political Science and International Relations at the University of Delaware. Khan is the founding director of the Islamic Studies Program at the university. He chaired the Department of Political Science and was Director of International Studies at Adrian College. He was a senior non-resident Fellow at the Brookings Institution from 2003 to 2008. He was a senior fellow of the Institute for Social Policy and Understanding from 2011-2014 and is a Senior Fellow of the New Lines Institute for Strategy and Policy, formerly the Center for Global Policy, since 2014. He earned his Ph.D. in international relations, political philosophy and Islamic political thought from Georgetown University in May 2000.

Of Indian origin, Khan is a proponent of change in the treatment of women in some Islamic societies, he identifies as traditional and liberal. Khan advocates independent thinking, and says that it is the inability of Muslims to sustain a dialogue with time and text which sometimes makes Islamic teachings appear anachronistic or intolerant.

Khan has testified at hearings hosted by the US Senate Foreign Relations Committee and the US House Armed Forces Committee. A fellow of the Institute for Social Policy and Understanding, he has been the president, vice-president and general secretary of the Association of Muslim Social Scientists. In October 2008, Khan received the Sir Syed Ahmed Khan Award for service to Islam from Aligarh Muslim University.

He maintains two websites which archive his articles: Ijtihad and Glocaleye. Khan writes for the On Faith Forum for the Washington Post and Newsweek.

== Praise and controversy ==
Khan is critical of radicalism and conservatism in Islamic thought and of Western foreign policies, racism and Islamophobia in the U.S. and the West.

Some of Khan's statements have ignited controversy. Some Shia Muslims objected to his comparison of Ayatollah Sistani to Saddam Hussein and his suggestion that Sistani was a dictator: "The US-led invasion of Iraq may have replaced an overt and brutal dictatorship by Saddam Hussein with a covert and subtle dictatorship by the Marja-e-Taqleed, Grand Ayatollah Ali Sistani—the highest-ranking Shiite authority on the planet:.

== Academic views ==
According to Khan, "America is without doubt one of the greatest countries in the World. Because it assumes we are moral beings and capable of doing good -- we are free. And because America assumes we are mature and capable of self governance -- we have democracy." "When I look at Islamic sources, I find in them unprecedented examples of religious tolerance and inclusiveness. They make me want to become a better person. I think the capacity to seek good and do good inheres in all of us. When we subdue this predisposition towards the good, we deny our fundamental humanity".

In a Washington Post article, Khan reportedly told Osama bin Laden to "go to Hell": "Before we rush to condemn America we must remember that even today millions of poor and miserable people all across the world are lining up outside US embassies eager to come to America, not just to live here but to become an American. No Muslim country today, can claim that people of other nations and other faiths see it as a promise of hope, equality, dignity and prosperity." He has written, "I remember telling my wife; maybe I will be our Henry Kissinger, the first Muslim to become the Secretary of State. Then came Bin Laden and his bloody men and along with the World Trade Center, American Muslim dreams and aspirations came crashing down."

Unlike the present day Islamists, Prophet Muhammad, when he established the first Islamic state in Medina – actually a Jewish-Muslim federation extended to religious minorities the rights that are guaranteed to them in the Quran. Prophet Muhammad's Medina was based on the covenant of Medina, a real and actual social contract agreed upon by Muslims, Jews and others that treated them as equal citizens of Medina. They enjoyed the freedom to choose the legal system they wished to live under. Jews could live under Islamic law, or Jewish law or pre-Islamic Arab tribal traditions. There was no compulsion in religion even though Medina was an Islamic state. The difference between Medina and today's Islamic states is profound. The state of Medina was based on a real social contract that applied divine law but only in consultation and with consent of all citizens regardless of their faith. But contemporary Islamic states apply Islamic law without consent or consultation and often through coercion. It is a sad commentary on contemporary Islamists that while democracy is a challenge to contemporary Islamic states, it was constitutive to the first Islamic state in Medina established by the Prophet of Islam.

In his latest book Islam and Good Governance: A Political Philosophy of Ihsan, he advances a political theory based on Sufi philosophy. He describes his purpose in writing the book as follows:

I am hoping that Islam and Good Governance will answer the question; “If extremism, Al Qaeda and ISIS style, is not genuinely Islamic form of politics, then what is?” Islam and Good Governance, articulates an approach to governance that departs radically from the Islamist goal to impose Sharia (Islamic laws) using the coercive tools of the state on its citizens. I advocate an approach to governance based on Ihsan (to do beautiful things) that privileges love over law and freedom of religion and thought over imposed adherence of religious mores. Most importantly I privilege process (good governance) over structure (Islamic state).

== Bibliography ==
- Islam and Good Governance: A Political Philosophy of Ihsan (ISBN 978-1-349-71814-6, Palgrave Macmillan, 2019).
- American Muslims: Bridging Faith and Freedom (ISBN 1-59008-012-2, Amana, 2002).
- Jihad for Jerusalem: Identity and Strategy in International Relations (ISBN 0-275-98014-6, Praeger, 2004).
- Islamic Democratic Discourse: Theory, Debates, and Philosophical Perspectives (ISBN 0-7391-0645-7, Lexington Books, 2006).
- Debating Moderate Islam: The Geopolitics of Islam and the West, (ISBN 0874809010, University of Utah Press, 2007).
