= Islam and Good Governance =

2019 book by M. A. Muqtedar Khan

Islam and Good Governance: A Political Philosophy of Ihsan is a 2019 book by the Indian American academic M. A. Muqtedar Khan.

== Sources ==
- Ibrahim, Samira I. (2023). "Islam and Good Governance A Political Philosophy of Ihsan (by M. A. Muqtedar Khan)". American Journal of Islam and Society. 40 (3–4): 174–178. doi:10.35632/ajis.v40i3-4.3158. ISSN 2690-3741.
- Koç, Ömer Faruk (2021). "M. A. Muqtedar Khan, Islam and Good Governance: A Political Philosophy of Ihsan". Critical Research on Religion. 9 (2): 233–236. doi:10.1177/20503032211015277. ISSN 2050-3032.
