= Institute for Social Policy and Understanding =

American research organization

The Institute for Social Policy and Understanding
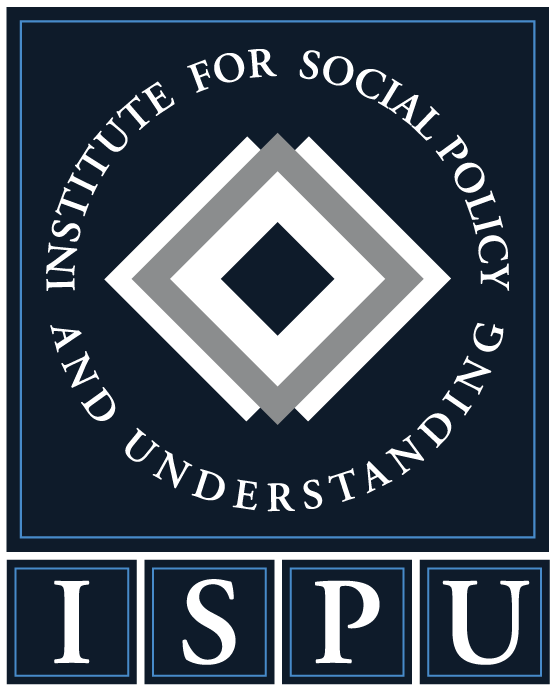
- Abbreviation: ISPU
- Established: 2002
- Type: 501(c)(3) organization
- Tax ID no.: 38-3633581
- Location(s): Washington, D.C. and Dearborn, MI, U.S.
- Website: www.ispu.org

The Institute for Social Policy and Understanding (ISPU) is a research organization with a focus on American Muslims. The Institute produces an annual American Muslim Poll and serves as a resource for journalists. Its reports and surveys have included topics such as political leanings, attitudes on censorship, experiences of discrimination, and responses to religiously motivated violence.

The Pulitzer Center on Crisis Reporting says, "The American Muslim Poll addresses a gaping deficit in popular knowledge: About 50 percent of Americans say they don’t know a Muslim in real life, leaving half the country to rely on the media to understand approximately 3.5 million of their compatriots, and 1.8 billion people around the world".

== History ==
Following the September 11 attacks, individuals came together to form ISPU to provide insights into the Islamic community in America. In April 2003, SPU's fellow published an article in The Encyclopedia of the Human Genome titled 'Race and Difference: Orientalism and Western Concepts.' ISPU officially incorporated December 17, 2003.

== Funding ==
The Institute for Social Policy and Understanding is funded by individual donors and institutional grants, including the Democracy Fund, The New York Community Trust, W. K. Kellogg Foundation, Pillars Fund, and Proteus Fund.

== Research areas and projects ==
ISPU's research areas include:

1. Developing community - focused on researching family & wellness and building community capacity.
2. Building understanding - protecting American pluralism while quantifying Muslim contributions
3. Thought leadership - offering platforms for discussion and informing national conversations.

Along with publishing original research, ISPU provides toolkits, interviews, webinars, presentations and workshops to disseminate this research to government officials, media professionals, educators, faith leaders and the general public.

Subject matter covered by ISPU studies and projects include: Studying marriage and divorce among American Muslims, tracking challenges facing American Muslim youth, analyzing Muslim spaces (mosques, community centers, etc.), and fostering debate and discussion on CVE (Countering Violent Extremism). ISPU has also conducted studies on Islamophobia and bias in media coverage of ideologically motivated violence in the United States.

== Scholars and fellows ==
ISPU works with a number of experts on a wide variety of issues related to their respective areas of research and specialty. Affiliated scholars and fellows include: Laila Alawa, Moustafa Bayoumi, Hassan Abbas, Arsalan Iftikhar, Asifa Quraishi-Landes, Ihsan Bagby, and Hatem Bazian, among others.
