= Kevin Lin (entrepreneur) =

American entrepreneur and co-founder of Twitch

- 林士斌
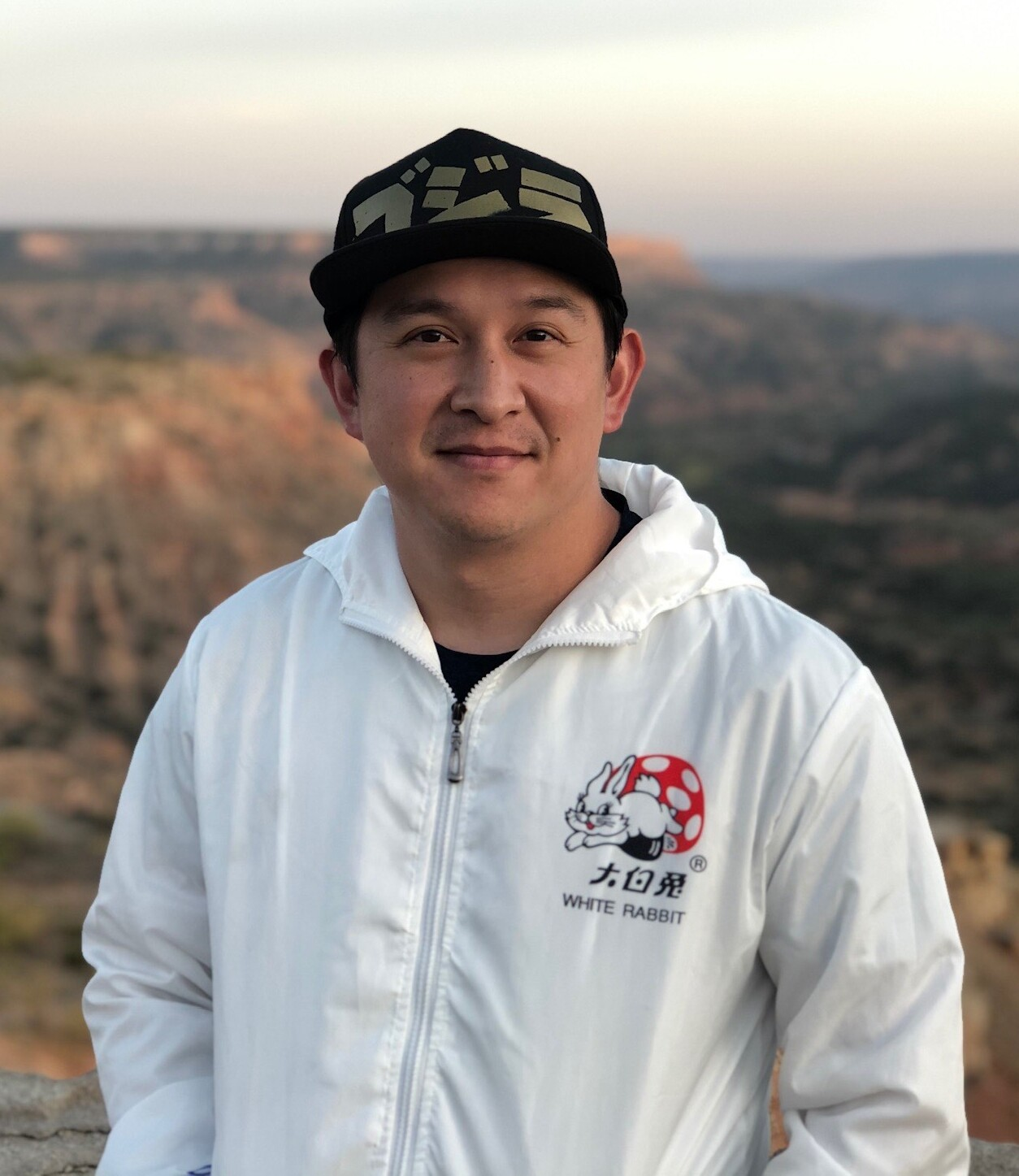
- Lin in 2020
- Born: 1982 (age 43–44)
- Occupations: Entrepreneur; technology executive
- Known for: Co-founding Twitch

Kevin Lin (Chinese name: 林士斌) is an entrepreneur and technology executive who co-founded the live-streaming service Twitch and served as its chief operating officer (COO). Twitch emerged from the live-video platform Justin.tv and was acquired by Amazon in 2014 for about $970 million. After leaving Twitch, Lin founded the interactive entertainment company Metatheory, which raised a $24 million Series A round in 2022.

== Early life ==
Lin was born in New Orleans, Louisiana in 1982. He graduated from Yale University with a degree in Ecology and Evolutionary Biology.

== Career ==
=== Twitch ===
Lin was an executive at Justin.tv and Twitch during the period when the company focused its gaming category into Twitch as a separate brand in 2011. In 2014, Lin issued a statement as Twitch's COO when the company shut down the Justin.tv service.

In August 2014, Amazon agreed to acquire Twitch for about $970 million in cash. In January 2018, Lin stepped down as Twitch's COO and moved into a role leading "Culture, Strategy & Innovation" reporting to CEO Emmett Shear, as Sara Clemens was hired as COO.

In November 2020, Lin announced that he was leaving Twitch, making CEO Emmett Shear the only remaining Twitch co-founder still at the company at that time.

=== 886 Studios ===
Lin co-founded 886 Studios, a Taipei-based venture firm, where he serves as a batch partner. The firm operates 886 Launchpad, a startup accelerator that provides funding and mentorship to early-stage companies.

=== Metatheory ===
In 2021, Lin founded Metatheory, an interactive entertainment company focused on games and virtual worlds that use blockchain technology. In May 2022, Metatheory announced a $24 million Series A round led by Andreessen Horowitz, with participation including Pantera Capital and FTX Ventures.

=== Sundance Film Festival Asia ===
Lin was part of the team at G2Go Entertainment that brought Sundance Film Festival: Asia to Taipei in August 2023. Taipei Times reported that Lin acquired the Sundance Asia license and organized the event in Taipei with partners Iris Wu and Jonathan Liao under a three-year deal. Lin described Sundance Film Festival Asia in Taipei as an "independent film celebration".

=== Gold House ===
With Bing Chen, Kevin Lin co-founded Gold House in 2018. The organization aims to support the Asian American community "By connecting executives across industries, financing new ventures and reshaping AAPI portrayals" and other initiatives.

== See also ==
- Twitch
- Justin.tv
