= The Blackhouse Foundation =

Non-profit organisation

The Blackhouse Foundation (2006–present) is a non-profit organization that creates new opportunities for the Black community in the film world. This foundation attends film festivals across the world every year to encourage the creation of independent films based on people of African background.

== History ==
The Blackhouse Foundation was created in 2006 when Brickson Diamond had attended two Sundance Film Festivals. There were very few black audience members, and even fewer films created by the black community. During Diamond's second visit, he met with Ryan Tarpley in an area designated for LGBTQ attendees, The Queer Lounge. It was then Diamond, Tarpley, and producer (Carol Ann Shine) thought of the idea for Blackhouse. Carol Ann Shine recommended that Diamond create an area for the black community at the Sundance Film Festival, similar to the area created for LGBTQ attendees. This was when Blackhouse was born.

== Mission ==
As a foundation, they have held 110 events, and 300-panel discussions. They have also built 15,419 relationships with producers, filmmakers, etc.

== Board of directors ==
=== Chairman ===
Brickson Diamond graduated from Brown University and Harvard Business School. He is also the Chief Operating Officer at the Executive Leadership Council (ELC). He has more than seventeen years of experience with investment management. Diamond is a trustee of Brown University, Middlesex School, and The Tides Foundation.

=== Board Members ===
Carol Ann Shine is a film producer. A few of her productions include Truth. Be. Told., Poses, Recover, Dirty Lies, The Comedy Underground Series, The Boy, and Blackbird. She has produced/co-produced 46 credits, written 1 credit, and was the production manager for 2 credits. She was also a cinematographer for 1 credit, and a second unit director or assistant director for 1 credit as well.

Ryan Tarpley graduated from Lawrence University and Ohio State University. He is Chief Diversity Officer at Creative Artists Agency (CAA). He is an entertainment executive based out of New York, NY. He is on the Board of Directors at Phoenix House of California, The Trevor Project, and KIPP Schools of LA.

Gina M. McAllister is a managing partner at Fortitude Financial Management based in Los Angeles, CA. She graduated from Michigan State University as well as Howard University. She is also treasurer of the Board of Directors for two corporations: The Imagine Initiative, Inc. and the Success 4 U Foundation, Inc.

Dolly Turner is the Managing Director of the Turner Group. She graduated from New York University and Harvard University. She is a marketing and creative executive in the TV, film, and music world.

DeMille Halliburton is the VP at Robertson Taylor CA. He graduated from Manhattanville College. He is involved in Usher's New Look Foundation, as well as the steering committee of the 21st Century Foundation.

Pauline Fischer is the VP of digital content acquisition for Netflix. She has contributed to Paramount Pictures projects as well. She is a graduate of Harvard University and UCLA.

Gordon Bobb is a partner at Del Shaw Moonves Tanaka Finkelstein & Lezcano. He has been associates at Kaye Scholer LLP and Willkie Farr & Gallagher LLP. He graduated from Georgetown University and received his law degree from Columbia University School of Law.

Datari Turner is an actor, writer, and producer. He has produced over 50 hours of programming for We TV (U.S. TV channel), TV One (U.S. TV network), Oxygen (TV channel), Starz, and BET. Some of the many films he is known for areVideo Girl, It's a Disaster, Lap Dance (film), and Kid Cannabis. He is a writer of Love Thy Sister. He has worked with Jay Z and Bruce Webber.

Elizabeth Polk is VP and in charge of Business and Legal Affairs at IM Global. She graduated from Howard University and Loyola Law School. She is a member of California Bar and is on the Legal Committee of the Independent Film & Television Alliance.
