= Pillars Fund =

- Founded: 2010; 16 years ago
- Type: Humanitarian aid
- Tax ID no.: 81-0983087
- Purpose: Funding secular programs supporting American Muslims
- Location: Chicago, Illinois, United States
- Region served: United States
- Product: Grants
- Key people: Kashif Shaikh; Executive Director
- Website: pillarsfund.org

Pillars Fund is a grant-making organization and Muslim community foundation named in reference to the five pillars of Islam, the third of which is Zakat.

Pillars Fund is governed by a Board of Advisors, many of whom are prominent American Muslims. The organization makes particular effort to ensure that donations go to projects that would not elicit controversy. It is one of the largest funders of Muslim issues in the United States.

== History ==
Founded in 2010 in the mold of United Way and Jewish Federations of North America, and headquartered in Chicago, Illinois, Pillars is focused on funding secular non-profit programs supporting American Muslims in media, public relations, and leadership development.

Pillars Fund was founded as a giving circle housed under the Chicago Community Trust in 2010 and became an independent entity in 2016. It raised a million dollars in 2016.

As of 2017, it had invested more than $2 million in a number of programs. It typically awards fifteen of the hundreds of grant applications it receives each year.

== Institutional funders ==
- Ford Foundation
- Nathan Cummings Foundation
- Open Society Foundations
- W. K. Kellogg Foundation

== Spending ==
Pillars Fund funds a variety of approaches towards its stated goal of "amplifying the leadership, narratives and talents of American Muslims," with stated program areas of rights, wellness, understanding and leadership.

=== Grantees ===
- Auburn Theological Seminary's "Voices of Change, Voices of America" Program
- Hartford Seminary's Islamic Chaplaincy Program
- Institute for Social Policy and Understanding
- Unity Productions Foundation
