= Kevin J. Anderson bibliography =

The following is a list of works by science fiction author Kevin J. Anderson.

== Standalone ==
- Resurrection, Inc. (1988)
- Climbing Olympus (1994)
- Blindfold (1995)
- Fantastic Voyage: Microcosm (2001)
- Hopscotch (2002)
- The Dragon Business (2013)
- Stake (2020)

== Star Wars expanded universe ==
- Darksaber (1996)

The Jedi Academy trilogy

1. Jedi Search (1994)
2. Dark Apprentice (1994)
3. Champions of the Force (1994)

Comic books series

- Dark Lords of the Sith (1994–95)
- The Sith War (1995–96)
- Golden Age of the Sith (1996–97)
- The Fall of the Sith Empire (1997)
- Redemption (1998)

Young Jedi Knights series (with Rebecca Moesta)

1. Heirs of the Force (1995)
2. Shadow Academy (1995)
3. The Lost Ones (1995)
4. Lightsabers (1996)
5. Darkest Knight (1996)
6. Jedi Under Siege (1996)
7. Shards of Alderaan (1997)
8. Diversity Alliance (1997)
9. Delusions of Grandeur (1997)
10. Jedi Bounty (1997)
11. The Emperor's Plague (1997)
12. Return to Ord Mantell (1998)
13. Trouble on Cloud City (1998)
14. Crisis at Crystal Reef (1998)

Short story anthologies edited by Anderson

- Tales from the Mos Eisley Cantina (1995)
- Tales from Jabba's Palace (1996)
- Tales of the Bounty Hunters (1996)

Reference works

- The Illustrated Star Wars Universe (1995)
- The Essential Chronology with Daniel Wallace (2000)
- The New Essential Chronology (original text only)

== The X-Files books ==
- Ground Zero (1995) ISBN 978-0-00-225448-9
- Ruins (1996) ISBN 978-0-00-648253-6
- Antibodies (1997) ISBN 978-0-00-224638-5

== Dune books ==
(all with Brian Herbert)

=== Dune prequel series ===
==== Prelude to Dune ====
- Dune: House Atreides (1999)
- Dune: House Harkonnen (2000)
- Dune: House Corrino (2001)

==== Legends of Dune ====
- Dune: The Butlerian Jihad (2002)
- Dune: The Machine Crusade (2003)
- Dune: The Battle of Corrin (2004)

==== Heroes of Dune ====
- Paul of Dune (2008)
- The Winds of Dune (2009)
- Princess of Dune (2023) (Originally titled Irulan of Dune)
- Leto of Dune (TBD) (Title may have changed to Golden Path of Dune but now currently on hold)

==== Great Schools of Dune ====
- Sisterhood of Dune (2012)
- Mentats of Dune (2014)
- Navigators of Dune (2016)

==== The Caladan Trilogy ====
- Dune: The Duke of Caladan (2020)
- Dune: The Lady of Caladan (2021)
- Dune: The Heir of Caladan (2022)

=== Dune 7 ===
- Hunters of Dune (2006)
- Sandworms of Dune (2007)

=== Short stories ===
- "Dune: A Whisper of Caladan Seas"
- "Dune: Hunting Harkonnens"
- "Dune: Whipping Mek"
- "Dune: The Faces of a Martyr"
- "Dune: Sea Child"
- "Dune: Treasure in the Sand"
- "Blood of the Sardaukar: A Tale of Dune" (in Unfettered III)

=== Companion book ===
(also with Frank Herbert)

- The Road to Dune (2005)

== The Saga of Seven Suns series ==
=== The Saga of Seven Suns ===
Prequel: Veiled Alliances (Graphic novel) (2004)

1. Hidden Empire (2002)
2. A Forest of Stars (2003)
3. Horizon Storms (2004; (P) and (C) 1998 Simon & Schuster)
4. Scattered Suns (2005)
5. Of Fire and Night (2006)
6. Metal Swarm (2007)
7. The Ashes of Worlds (2008)

=== The Saga of Shadows trilogy ===
(Sequel trilogy to The Saga of Seven Suns)

Prequel: Whistling Past the Graveyard (2016)

1. The Dark Between the Stars (2014)
2. Blood of the Cosmos (2015)
3. Eternity's Mind (2016)

== Dan Shamble, Zombie P.I. series ==
- Death Warmed Over (September 1, 2012)
- Unnatural Acts (January 1, 2013)
- Hair Raising (May 2013)
- Slimy Underbelly (September 2014)
- Working Stiff (short story collection, October 2014)
- Tastes Like Chicken (November 2017)
- Services Rendered (October 2018)
- Double-Booked (November 2018)
- Bats in the Belfry (November 2023)

== Other series ==
=== Gamearth Trilogy ===
1. Gamearth (March 1989)
2. Gameplay (October 1989)
3. Game's End (September 1990)

(Republished as Hexworld Trilogy in 2021)

=== Terra Incognita series ===
- The Edge of the World (2009)
- The Map of All Things (2010)
- The Key to Creation (2011)

A trilogy about two countries, Uraba and Tierra, at war with each other. It is set in a world similar to early modern Europe, impacted by such inventions as gunpowder and hot air balloons and by the discovery of hitherto unknown lands and oceans, both countries exploring the world in order to gain an upper hand against the other. One goal is to find the sacred land of Terravitae. However, the fanatic religious war, with each country believing its religion to be the only correct one and the other's a blasphemous heresy and engaging in an escalating series of atrocities, is reminiscent of an earlier historical period, that of the Crusades with its struggle between Medieval Christianity and Islam. The series' Holy City of Ishalem, sacred to both religions and which both kingdoms are utterly determined to possess at all costs, is reminiscent of Medieval attitudes to Jerusalem.

Anderson and ProgRock Records owner and musician Shawn Gordon created a crossover project called Roswell Six and released the album "Terra Incognita: Beyond The Horizon" with Erik Norlander for book 1 and "Terra Incognita: A Line In The Sand" with Henning Pauly. They combine progressive rock/metal with science fiction lyrics by Anderson and his wife.

=== Wake the Dragon series ===
- Spine of the Dragon (2019)
- Vengewar (2021)
- Gods and Dragons (2022)

=== Hexworld Trilogy ===
(Republished from Gamearth Trilogy)

1. Roll (2021)
2. Play (2021)
3. End (2021)

== Pseudonyms ==
=== As K. J. Anderson ===
- Captain Nemo: The Fantastic History of a Dark Genius (2002) (a fictional life of Jules Verne's Captain Nemo)
- The League of Extraordinary Gentlemen – novelization of the 2003 movie
- Sky Captain and the World of Tomorrow – novelization of the 2004 movie

=== Other pseudonyms ===
- The Siege of the Tower (Endless Quest) with Rebecca Moesta (1994) (as Kem Antilles)
- Highest Score (Star Trek: Deep Space Nine) with Rebecca Moesta (1996) (as Kem Antilles)
- StarCraft: Shadow of the Xel'Naga (2001) (as Gabriel Mesta)
- The Martian War (2005) (as Gabriel Mesta)

== Collaborations ==
=== With Doug Beason ===
- Lifeline (1990)
- The Trinity Paradox (1991)
- Assemblers of Infinity (1993)
- Ill Wind (1995)
- Ignition (1996)
- Fallout (1997)
- Kill Zone (2019)

==== Craig Kreident series ====
- Virtual Destruction (1996)
- Fallout (1997)
- Lethal Exposure (1998)

=== With Rebecca Moesta ===
==== Crystal Doors series ====
- Island Realm (2006)
- Ocean Realm (2007)
- Sky Realm (2008)

==== Star Challengers series ====
- Moonbase Crisis (2010)
- Space Station Crisis (2011)
- Asteroid Crisis (2011)

=== With Brian Herbert ===
==== Hellhole trilogy ====
- Hellhole (2011)
- Hellhole Awakening (2013)
- Hellhole Inferno (2014)

=== Other collaborations ===
- Dean Koontz's Frankenstein, Book One: Prodigal Son with Dean Koontz (2005). Subsequent printings removed Anderson's name from the cover.
- Tau Ceti (The Stellar Guild series), with Steven Savile (2011).
- Clockwork Angels with Neil Peart (2012) — Novelization of Rush's 19th studio album of the same name.
- Ai! Pedrito, utilizing materials by L. Ron Hubbard (1998).
- Slan Hunter, utilizing materials by A. E. van Vogt (2007).
- Clockwork Lives with Neil Peart (2015) - a sequel to Clockwork Angels.
- Uncharted with Sarah A. Hoyt (2018) - Alternate history novel
- Clockwork Destiny with Neil Peart (2022) - conclusion of the Clockwork trilogy; published after Peart's death in 2020.

== Comics ==
- JSA Strange Adventures #1–6 – 2005, DC Comics
- Kolchak: The Night Stalker and Dan Shamble, Zombie P.I.: Unnaturally Normal (with Richard Dean Starr (Moonstone Books, 2016)
- Stalag-X (with co-writer Steven L. Sears and artist Mike Ratera (Vault Comics, 2018)

== DC Comics novels ==
- The Last Days of Krypton (2007)
- Enemies & Allies: The Dark Knight Meets the Man of Steel (2009)

== Edited volumes ==
He has also edited anthologies including:

- War of the Worlds: Global Dispatches (1996, ISBN 0-553-10353-9)
- Blood Lite (2008)
- Blood Lite II: Overbite (2011)
- The Nebula Awards Showcase 2011 (2011)
- Blood Lite III: Aftertaste (2012)
- Five by Five 3: Target Zone (2014)

== Short fiction ==
Title	Year	First published in	Reprinted in
Final Performance	1985	F&SF	Dogged Persistence (Golden Gryphon Press, 2001)
The Old Man and the Cherry Tree	1986	Grue 3	Dogged Persistence (Golden Gryphon Press, 2001)
Reflections in a Magnetic Mirror (with Doug Beason)	1988	Full Spectrum, ed. Lou Aronica and Shawna McCarthy (Bantam Spectra, 1988)	Dogged Persistence (Golden Gryphon Press, 2001)
Entropy Ranch	1990	Starshore (Winter 1990)	Dogged Persistence (Golden Gryphon Press, 2001)
New Recruits	1990	Weirdbook 25	Dogged Persistence (Golden Gryphon Press, 2001)
Rescue at L-5 (with Doug Beason)	1990	Project Solar Sail, ed. Arthur C. Clarke and David Brin (Roc/Penguin, 1990)	
Fondest of Memories	1991	Full Spectrum 3, ed. Lou Aronica, Amy Stout and Betsy Mitchell (Doubleday Foundation, 1991)	Dogged Persistence (Golden Gryphon Press, 2001)
The Ghost of Christmas Always	1991	Pulphouse (December 31, 1991)	Dogged Persistence (Golden Gryphon Press, 2001)
Much at Stake	1991	The Ultimate Dracula, ed. Byron Preiss, David Kellor and Megan Miller (Dell)	Dogged Persistence (Golden Gryphon Press, 2001)
Dogged Persistence	1992	F&SF	Dogged Persistence (Golden Gryphon Press, 2001)
Human, Martian - One, Two, Three	1993	Full Spectrum 4, ed. Lou Aronica et al. (Bantam Spectra)	Dogged Persistence (Golden Gryphon Press, 2001)
Music Played on the Strings of Time	1993	Analog 113/1&2 (Jan 1993)	Dogged Persistence (Golden Gryphon Press, 2001)
Tide Pools	1993	Analog 113/14 (Dec 1993)	Dogged Persistence (Golden Gryphon Press, 2001)
Drumbeats (with Neil Peart)	1994	Shock Rock II, ed. Jeff Gelb (Pocket Books)	Dogged Persistence (Golden Gryphon Press, 2001)
Sea Dreams (with Rebecca Moesta)	1995	Peter S. Beagle's Immortal Unicorn, ed. Peter S. Beagle, Janet Berliner and Martin H. Greenberg (HarperPrism)	Dogged Persistence (Golden Gryphon Press, 2001)
Canals in the Sand	1996	War of the Worlds: Global Dispatches, ed. Kevin J. Anderson (Bantam Spectra)	Dogged Persistence (Golden Gryphon Press, 2001)
Scientific Romance	1998	The UFO Files, ed. Ed Gorman and Martin H. Greenberg (DAW)	Dogged Persistence (Golden Gryphon Press, 2001)
Dune: A Whisper of Caladan Seas (with Brian Herbert)	1999	Amazing Stories (Summer 1999)	Dogged Persistence (Golden Gryphon Press, 2001)
Prisoner of War	2000	The Outer Limits: Armageddon Dreams, ed. Kevin J. Anderson (BSV Publishing)	Dogged Persistence (Golden Gryphon Press, 2001)
Blood Oasis	2011	Untold Adventures: A Dungeons & Dragons Anthology (Wizards of the Coast)	
Santa Claus Is Coming to Get You	2011	Deathrealm, ed. Stephen Mark Rainey (Fall/Winter, 1991)	Shock Totem: Holiday Tales of the Macabre and Twisted 2011, (Shock Totem Publications, 2011)
Nuptials	2025	Hearts of the Abyss: Tales of Monster Love (Wildside Press, 2025)	

=== Collections ===
- Dogged Persistence (Golden Gryphon Press, 2001)
  - 18 stories: Canals in the Sand, Dogged Persistence, Drumbeats, Dune: A Whisper of Caladan Seas, Entropy Ranch, Final Performance, Fondest of Memories, The Ghost of Christmas Always, Human, Martian - One, Two, Three, Much at Stake, Music Played on the Strings of Time, New Recruits, The Old Man and the Cherry Tree, Prisoner of War, Reflections in a Magnetic Mirror, Scientific Romance, Sea Dreams, Tide Pools
- Landscapes

== See also ==
- Category:Novels by Kevin J. Anderson
