= List of The Saga of Shadows characters =

The following is a list of characters featured in The Saga of Shadows, a forthcoming trilogy of science fiction novels written by Kevin J. Anderson. The first novel, The Dark Between the Stars, was released by Tor Books on June 3, 2014.

For characters from Anderson's preceding novel series The Saga of Seven Suns (2002-2008), see List of The Saga of Seven Suns characters.

Key:

= Point of view character
= Regular character
= Supporting character

== Humans ==
=== Confederation ===
In the series, the human race has colonized multiple planets in the Spiral Arm. Since the dissolution of the corrupt Terran Hanseatic League, human civilization is allied under the Confederation, currently ruled by King Peter and Queen Estarra of Theroc. This planet's "green priests" are able to commune with the semi-sentient worldtrees and communicate telepathically across space when touching a treeling, making them indispensable for instantaneous communication across the galaxy.

Character	Book 1	Description
King Peter	POV	Ruler of the Confederation and Father of Theroc
Queen Estarra		Mother of Theroc, wife of King Peter
Prince Reyn	POV	Son and heir of King Peter and Queen Estarra of the Confederation
Princess Arita	POV	Daughter of King Peter and Queen Estarra of the Confederation; a botanist studying plant life on the abandoned Klikiss world of Eljiid
Idriss		Estarra's father, and former Father of Theroc
Nira Khali	POV	Green priest consort of Mage-Imperator Jora'h of Ildira
Eldred Cain	POV	Confederation Deputy on Earth
Anton Colicos	POV	Historian and academic known as the human expert on the Ildiran Saga of Seven Suns
Nalani Keah	POV	General in the Confederation Defense Forces (CDF)
Rlinda Kett	POV	Former trader and later the Confederation's Trade Minister; now the owner of a large shipping company.
Tasia Tamblyn	POV	Roamer and former EDF officer; runs Rlinda Kett's shipping company
Robb Brindle		Former EDF officer; runs Rlinda Kett's shipping company
Xander Brindle	POV	19-year-old son of Robb Brindle and Tasia Tamblyn, a pilot
Orli Covitz	POV	Compy advocate, stationed at her lab on Relleker
Matthew Freling		Orli's husband
Zoe Alakis	POV	Disease researcher with her own planetoid, Pergamus
Adam and Evelyn Alakis		Zoe's parents, who had both died on the jungle planet Vaconda
Tom Rom	POV	Associate of researcher Zoe Alakis
Shelud	POV	Green priest and younger brother of Aelin, accompanies Clan Reves on their self-imposed exile
Aelin	POV	Green priest and older brother of Shelud
Sarein		Oldest sister of Estarra and Celli, former Earth Ambassador to Theroc, now living in self-imposed exile in the Wild
Celli		Youngest sister of Sarein and Estarra, a green priest residing at Fireheart Station
Solimar		Celli's green priest mate
Kennebar		Leader of isolationist green priests living in the Wild on Theroc
Terry Handon		Mechanic and service engineer from the Ulio transfer station; Xander Brindle's partner
Howard Rohandas		Shareen's friend at school on Earth

=== Roamers ===
In the series, the Roamers are clans of industrious humans once living a clandestine existence in the fringes of space, but now allied with planet-bound colonies under the Confederation. Managing a profitable economy centered on the sale of the valuable stardrive fuel ekti and other commodities, the Roamers are still adjusting to their new place in the Confederation while trying to maintain their independence and historical culture.

Character	Book 1	Description
Del Kellum	POV	Former Speaker of the Roamers, distiller on Kuivahr
Zhett Kellum	POV	Daughter of Del Kellum, wife of Patrick Fitzpatrick III and operator of skymine at Golgen
Patrick Fitzpatrick III	POV	Husband of Zhett Kellum
Shareen Fitzkellum	POV	17-year-old daughter of Patrick Fitzpatrick and Zhett Kellum
Kristof "Toff" Fitzkellum		13-year-old son of Patrick Fitzpatrick and Zhett Kellum
Rex Fitzkellum		2-year-old son of Patrick Fitzpatrick and Zhett Kellum
Garrison Reeves	POV	Roamer engineer and husband to Elisa Reeves
Elisa Enturi Reeves	POV	Deputy to Lee Iswander and wife of Garrison
Seth Reeves		Teenage son of Garrison and Elisa Reeves
Olaf Reeves		Garrison's father and head of Clan Reeves
Dale Reeves	POV	Garrison's brother
Sendra Reeves		Dale's wife, and mother to his sons Scott and Jamie
Cesca Peroni		Former Speaker of the Roamers; runs Academ, the school for Roamer children houses in a wental-infused, hollowed-out captive comet near Newstation
Jess Tamblyn	POV	Cesca's husband and co-head of the Academ school
Isha Seward		Interim Speaker of the Roamers
Sam Ricks		New Speaker of the Roamers
Lee Iswander	POV	Roamer owner of lava-processing operations on Sheol, Iswander Industries
Londa and Arden Iswander		Lee Iswander's wife and teenage son
Alec Pannebaker		Deputy to Lee Iswander
Marius Denva		Del Kellum's distillery manager

== Ildirans ==
In the series, the Ildiran Empire has existed for over ten thousand years, living peacefully due to a communal mental interconnectedness called the thism. Each Ildiran has what is called a soulthread, and these soulthreads are woven together by their leader, the Mage-Imperator. Ildirans have a very specialized society, with specific castes that are adept at performing particular tasks. The castes are physically different from one another, and have different suffixes at the end of their names. Ildirans are the first extraterrestrials that humanity encounters upon exploring space beyond Earth, and the Ildirans share their stardrive technology with humans.

Character	Book 1	Description
Mage-Imperator Jora'h	POV	Ruler of the Ildirans
Adar Zan'nh	POV	Eldest son of Mage-Imperator Jora'h and supreme commander of the Ildiran Solar Navy
Yazra'h	POV	Noble-born warrior daughter of Mage-Imperator Jora'h
Prime Designate Daro'h		Son and heir to Jora'h
Osira'h	POV	Half human/half Ildiran daughter of Nira and Mage-Imperator Jora'h
Rod'h	POV	Half human/half Ildiran son of Nira and former Dobro Designate Udru'h
Tal Gale'nh	POV	Half human/half Ildiran son of Nira and Adar Kori'nh; military commander of the new Kolpraxa warship
Tamo'l	POV	Half human/half Ildiran daughter of Nira and a Lens kithman; medical researcher on Kuivahr working with the less successful mixed breeds from Dobro
Muree'n		Half human/half Ildiran warrior daughter of Nira and a Guard kithman
Tora'm		Swimmer kithman on Kuivahr, befriends Shareen Fitzkellum and Howard Rohandas.
Rememberer Ko'sh		Rememberer assigned to the Kolpraxa
Chiar'h		Noble kithwoman married to the human Shawn Fennis, both are volunteers at Tamo'l's facility

== Artificial intelligence ==
Character	Book 1	Description
Exxos	POV	Leader of the remaining thousand Klikiss robots, discovered hiding inside a moon of Dhula
DD		Orli Covitz's Friendly model compy, former compy of Louis and Margaret Colicos
MO		Domestic compy at Orli's Relleker facility
LU		Listener compy at Orli's Relleker facility
BO		Teacher compy at Academ, sent by Cesca with the children of Clan Reeves
OK		Xander Brindle and Terry Handon's compy navigator
