= Full Spectrum =

Fantasy and science fiction short stories published by Bantam Spectra (1988-95)

- Cover of first edition (paperback)
- Editors: Lou Aronica and Shawna McCarthy
- Cover artist: Peter Stallard
- Language: English
- Genre: Science fiction anthology
- Published: 1988
- Publisher: Bantam Spectra
- Media type: Print (paperback)
- Pages: 483
- ISBN: 0-553-27482-1

Full Spectrum is a series of five anthologies of fantasy and science fiction short stories published between 1988 and 1995 by Bantam Spectra. The first anthology was edited by Lou Aronica and Shawna McCarthy; the second by Aronica, McCarthy, Amy Stout, and Pat LoBrutto; the third and fourth by Aronica, Stout, and Betsy Mitchell; and the fifth by Jennifer Hershey, Tom Dupree, and Janna Silverstein.

== Volumes ==
- Full Spectrum - 1988
  - Contents
    - Introduction – Lou Aronica and Shawna McCarthy
    - Voices of the Kill - Thomas M Disch
    - This is the Year Zero - Andrew Weiner
    - Proselytes - Gregory Benford
    - The Fort Moxie Branch - Jack McDevitt
    - Prayerware - Jack Massa
    - Mannequins - Charles Oberndorf
    - Moments of Clarity - Elissa Malcohn
    - A Gift of the People - Robert Sampson
    - The Last Rainmaking Song - Jeffrey J. Mariotte
    - Tinker to Evers to Chance - Steven Bryan Bieler
    - The Farm System - Howard V. Hendrix
    - Ghost Ship - Walton Simons
    - Philippa's Hands - Nancy Kress
    - Reflections in a Magnetic Mirror - Kevin J Anderson and Doug Beason
    - Listening - Ronnie Seagren
    - My Year with the Aliens - Lisa Goldstein
    - Oz - Lewis Shiner
    - Dead Men on TV - Pat Murphy
    - Once in a Lullaby - Fred Bals
    - My Imaginary Parents - T. L. Parkinson
    - Bible Stories for Adults, No. 17: The Deluge - James Morrow
    - Beyond the Seventh Sphere - Aaron Schutz
    - Magister Rudy - Richard Grant
    - The Thing Itself - Michael Blumlein
    - Journals of the Plague Years - Norman Spinrad
      Full Spectrum 2
      - Editors: Lou Aronica, Shawna McCarthy, Amy Stout and Patrick LoBrutto
      - Cover artist: Peter Stallard
      - Language: English
      - Genre: Science fiction anthology
      - Publisher: Bantam Spectra
      - Publication date: 1989
      - Media type: Print (paperback)
      - Pages: 548
      - ISBN: 0-553-28530-0
- Full Spectrum 2 - 1989
  - Contents
    - 'Saurus Wrecks - Edward Bryant
    - Whistle - Jack McDevitt
    - Attitude of the Earth Toward Other Bodies - James Sallis
    - Malheur Maar - Vonda N. McIntyre
    - The Boy in the Tree - Elizabeth Hand
    - All Our Sins Forgotten - David Ira Cleary
    - The Painted Man - Joseph Gangemi
    - A Plague of Strangers - Karen Haber
    - The Giving Plague - David Brin;
    - Re: Generations - Mike McQuay
    - Silver - Steven Spruill
    - As a Still Small Voice - Marcos Donnelly
    - Then I Sleeps and Dreams of Rose - Deborah Million
    - A Plethora of Angels - Robert Sampson;
    - Strange Attractors - Lori Ann White
    - Barbara Hutton Toujours - Gay Partington Terry
    - The Gamemaker - Carolyn Ives Gilman
    - An Excerpt from The Confession of the Alchemist Edward Dee, Who Was Burnt in the City of Findias on the Planet Paracelsus, 1437 PIC (Post Imperial Colonial Period) - Michaela Roessner
    - The Doorkeeper of Khaat - Patricia A. McKillip;
    - Dogs Die - Michael Kallenberger
    - Rain, Steam and Speed - Steven Popkes
    - Close to Light - Charles Oberndorf
    - Shiva - James Killus
    - Sleepside Story - Greg Bear;
    - Frankenstein Goes Home - Alan Rodgers
    - The Edge of the World - Michael Swanwick
    - The Part of Us that Loves - Kim Stanley Robinson
- Full Spectrum 3 - 1991
  - Contents
    - Introduction – Lou Aronica
    - Daughter Earth – James Morrow
    - Dogstar Man – Nancy Willard
    - Prism Tree – Tony Daniel
    - Desert Rain – Mark L. Van Name and Pat Murphy
    - Precious Moments – Kristine Kathryn Rusch
    - Lethe – Peg Kerr
    - Lake Agassiz – Jack McDevitt
    - Transfusion – Joelle Wintrebert, translated by Kim Stanley Robinson
    - The Dark at the Corner of the Eye – Patricia Anthony
    - Tracking the Random Variable – Marcos Donnelly
    - Division By Zero – Ted Chiang
    - Matter’s End – Gregory Benford
    - Newton’s Sleep – Ursula K. LeGuin
    - The Helping Hand – Norman Spinrad
    - Fondest of Memories – Kevin J. Anderson
    - Loitering at Death’s Door – Wolfgang Jeschke, translated by Sally Schiller and Anne Calveley
    - Rokuro – Poul Anderson
    - Police Actions – Barry N. Malzberg
    - Black Glass – Karen Joy Fowler
    - Chango Chingmadre, Dutchman, & Me – R. V. Branham
    - Apartheid, Superstrings, and Mordecai Thubana – Michael Bishop
    - Snow on Sugar Mountain – Elizabeth Hand
    - When the Rose is Dead – David Zindell

Cover Art by Barclay Shaw

- Full Spectrum 4 - 1993
  - Contents
    - Fragments from the Women's Writing - Ursula K. Le Guin
    - Motherhood, Etc. - L. Timmel Duchamp
    - The Saints - Bonita Kale
    - The Best Lives of Our Years - A. R. Morlan
    - Embodied In Its Opposite - John M. Landsberg
    - Foreigners - Mark Rich
    - The Googleplex Comes and Goes - Del Stone Jr.
    - The Beauty Addict - Ray Aldridge
    - In Medicis Gardens - Jean-Claude Dunyach
    - The Woman Who Loved Pigs - Stephen R. Donaldson
    - The Story So Far - Martha Soukup
    - Suicidal Tendencies - Dave Smeds
    - The Mind's Place - Gregory Feeley
    - Ah! Bright Wings - Howard V. Hendrix
    - Vox Domini - Bruce Holland Rogers
    - The Erl-King - Elizabeth Hand
    - The Death of John Patrick Yoder - Nancy Kress
    - Human, Martian - One, Two, Three - Kevin J. Anderson
    - What Continues, What Fails - David Brin
    - Roar at the heart of the World - Danith McPherson
    - About the Authors

Cover Art by SIUDMAK

- Full Spectrum 5 - 1995
  - Contents
    - Simply Indispensable - Michael Bishop
    - The Insipid Profession of Jonathan Hormebom - Jonathan Lethem
    - Evita, Among the Wild Beasts - S.A.Stolnack
    - The Music of What Happens - Howard V. Hendrix
    - A Belly Full of Stars - Michael Gust
    - Cool Zone - Pat York
    - Of Silence and Slow Time - Karawynn Long
    - The Breakthrough - Paul Park
    - Shimabara - Karen Joy Fowler
    - What Dreams Are Made On - Mark Bourne
    - Which Darkness Will Come Upon Us? - John M. Landsberg
    - Wonders of the Invisible World - Patricia A. McKillip
    - Excerpt from the Third and Last Volume of Tribes of the Pacific Coast - Neal Stephenson
    - The Sixty-third Anniversary of Hysteria - Lisa Mason
    - When a Man's an Empty Kettle - William Barton
    - The Dead Eye of the Camera - Jean-Claude Dunyach
    - Tale of the Blue Spruce Dreaming (Or How to Be Flesh) - Jean Mark Gawron
    - The Question Eaters - Tricia Sullivan
    - Homecoming - Doug Beason
    - The Massive Quantities of Ice - William John Watkins
    - Hearts and Flowers - Lawrence Watt-Evans
    - Goddoggit - Emily Devenport
    - Saving Face - Andrew Lane
    - Ruby - Alan Rodgers
    - Where the Shadows Rise and Fall - Pat MacEwen
    - Fountains in Summer - Richard Bowes
    - A Fruitful Harvest - Lauren Fitzgerald
    - The Ziggurat - Gene Wolfe
    - About the Authors

Cover Art by Michael Parkes

== Awards ==
Full Spectrum 4, the fourth book from the series won the 1994 World Fantasy Award for Best Anthology.

Full Spectrum 1 and 3 both won the Locus Award for Best Anthology

Several works from the series have been nominated for awards as well. From the first anthology, "Bible Stories for Adults, No. 17: The Deluge" by James K. Morrow won the 1989 Nebula Award for Best Short Story, "The Fourth Moxie Branch" by Jack McDevitt was nominated for the 1989 Hugo Award for Best Short Story and the Nebula Award for Best Short Story; "Voices of the Kill" by Thomas M. Disch and "Dead Men on TV" by Pat Murphy were nominated for the Nebula Award for Best Short Story, and "Journals of the Plague Years" by Norman Spinrad was nominated for the 1989 Hugo Award for Best Novella and Nebula Award for Best Novella.

"The Edge of the World" by Michael Swanwick in Full Spectrum 2 was nominated for the 1990 World Fantasy Award for Best Short Story. "Black Glass" by Karen Joy Fowler in Full Spectrum 3 was nominated for the 1992 Nebula Award for Best Novelette and "Matter's End" by Gregory Benford was nominated for the 1993 Nebula Award for Best Novelette. "The Erl-King" by Elizabeth Hand from Full Spectrum 4 was nominated for the 1994 World Fantasy Award for Best Novella, "The Story So Far" by Martha Soukup from that anthology was nominated for the 1994 Hugo Award for Best Short Story, and "The Beauty Addict" by Ray Aldridge was nominated for the Nebula Award for Best Novella. "The Insipid Profession of Jonathan Hornebom" by Jonathan Lethem from Full Spectrum 5 was nominated for the 1995 World Fantasy Award for Best Novella.
