= List of The Saga of Seven Suns characters =

The following is a list of characters featured in The Saga of Seven Suns, a series of science fiction novels written by Kevin J. Anderson from 2002 to 2008.

For characters in the sequel trilogy The Saga of Shadows, see List of The Saga of Shadows characters.

== Humans ==
=== Terran Hanseatic League ===
In the future, the human race has colonized multiple planets in the Spiral Arm, most of which are governed by the powerful Terran Hanseatic League (Hansa). Though ostensibly ruled by kings, the Hansa is actually controlled by its Chairman, and the puppet monarchs merely follow orders.

==== Hansa ====
Character	Description
Basil Wenceslas	Chairman of the Hansa throughout The Saga of Seven Suns series. The true power behind the figurehead kings of the Hansa, Basil prefers to stay out of the public eye and control things from behind the scenes. As the series begins, he chooses young Raymond Aguerra to be trained as a successor to King Frederick. In doing so, Basil assassinates the young man's family in a staged "accident", and keeps Raymond — now called Prince Peter — as a veritable hostage in the bowels of the Whisper Palace. Though an intelligent and clever man, Basil's long stint as Chairman has made him arrogant, self-important and unwilling to consider any opinions other than his own. The appearance of the destructive hydrogues throws the whole of human civilization into chaos, and though Basil's usual tactics are doing no good, he refuses to adapt. Meanwhile, Peter has succeeded Frederick as king and has his own ideas about how the escalating hydrogue threat should be handled; Basil, despising being challenged, ignores Peter's input and is soon drugging, coercing and threatening the young king into following his orders. Eventually Basil decides to assassinate Peter and his new queen, Estarra of Theroc, and start over. The attempt fails, and as Peter actively works to thwart Basil and somehow help humanity navigate the perils of the hydrogue war, Basil's decisions become increasingly rash, misguided and destructive. Even Basil's protégée and sometimes lover Sarein, the ambassador from Theroc and Estarra's sister, notices how Basil's actions are becoming dangerous and counterproductive. With humans and Ildirans under attack from elemental races, Klikiss robots and the Klikiss themselves, the Hansa and its military crumbles under Basil's control. Sarein helps Peter and Estarra escape Earth and defect to Theroc, where they initiate a new Confederation with which they intend to supplant the Hansa.
King Frederick	Sixth Great King of the Terran Hanseatic League who rules from 2381 to 2427 AD; succeeded by King Peter upon his death in Hidden Empire (2002) when a hydrogue emissary detonates itself in the Whisper Palace.
King Peter	The eldest son of Rita and Esteban Aguerra, 14-year-old Raymond Aguerra lives with his mother and brothers until his family is killed in an explosion; he is snatched by the Chairman and trained to be the next king. From the beginning he is resistant to Basil's control, and eventually seeks to assert himself.
Davlin Lotze	Former Silver Beret, exosociologist and "expert in obscure details", Davlin is a trusted agent of Basil Wenceslas and the Hansa who is tasked with infiltrating the new human colony on Crenna and investigating whatever artifacts the Ildrians may have left behind. Davlin finds nothing of note, but becomes attached to the colonists. He is later sent with trader pilot Rlinda Kett to locate the missing xenoarchaeologists Margaret and Louis Colicos. He and Rlinda find traces of the couple on Rheindic Co, as well as their last discovery: the Klikiss transportal. Davlin steps through, and vanishes. Forced to traverse Klikiss world after Klikiss world until he can find the correct coordinate tile to bring him back, Davlin eventually returns after many days, near death. Rlinda is still waiting for him with food and water. They return to Earth and report the existence of the transportal system to the Hansa. Davlin's records of his travels are the basis for a Hansa colonization effort using the transportals. Retiring from service to the Hansa and settling on Crenna, Davlin is soon faced with the extinguishing of the planet's sun thanks to a battle between the hydrogues and faeros. With the help of Rlinda and her ex-husband Branson Roberts, Davlin manages to evacuate the Crenna colonists to the abandoned Klikiss world of Llaro, but the Klikiss soon return and subjugate the human settlement. With the help of the captive Margaret Colicos, Davlin spearheads an escape plan; he is eventually assimilated by the Klikiss breedex, and manages to assert his control over the race and halt their attack on humanity.
Eldred Cain	Heir-apparent and deputy of Chairman Wenceslas. He is loyal to Basil and the Hansa, but begins to recognize Basil's increasing failings and bad decisions, which become detrimental to the stability of the Hansa. Cain eventually helps King Peter subvert Basil.
Franz Pellidor	Basil Wenceslas's "expediter", who does the Chairman's dirty work, including kidnapping and attempted murder.
Capt. Richard McCammon	Head of the Silver Berets and the Royal Guards, sympathizer and friend of King Peter and Sarein.
Maureen Fitzpatrick	Basil's predecessor as Chairman, known as the "Battle Axe" of the Hansa; grandmother of Patrick Fitzpatrick III.
Prince Daniel	Hastily chosen replacement for a misbehaving King Peter, though Daniel does not live up to Basil's expectations.
King Rory	Introduced in The Ashes of Worlds (2008) as the replacement for King Peter; he resembles Peter's deceased younger brother Rory Aguerra.
Backstory
King Ben	First King of the Terran Hanseatic League (2221-2254 AD)
King George	Second King of the Terran Hanseatic League (2254-2274 AD)
King Christopher	Third King of the Terran Hanseatic League (2274-2307 AD)
King Jack	Fourth King of the Terran Hanseatic League (2307-2323 AD)
King Bartholomew	Fifth King of the Terran Hanseatic League (2323-2381 AD), succeeded by King Frederick.
Prince Adam	Original heir to Frederick, found to be unsuitable by Basil and replaced with Peter.
Malcolm Stannis	Hansa Chairman during the reign of King Ben.
Bertram Goswell	Hansa Chairman from 2291 to 2298 AD; in his term he tried to persuade the Roamers to sign the Hansa charter, and it is partly due to Goswell's name that the Roamers started calling Hansa the "Big Goose".
Miguel Byron	Hansa Chairman from 2315 to 2347 AD, he developed a reputation for being hedonistic.

==== Earth Defense Forces ====
Character	Description
General Kurt Lanyan	Commander of the Earth Defense Forces.
Robb Brindle	Son of two Earth Defense Forces veterans who enlists in the EDF as a pilot at the start of the war against the hydrogues. Robb and Tasia Tamblyn become close friends as recruits, and later lovers. Robb traces the hydrogue warships that had attacked Boone's Crossing back to the gas giant Osquivel, and volunteers for a daring attempt to communicate with the hydrogues there in a high-pressure vessel. Presumed dead when transmissions from his vessel stop and the hydrogues attack the EDF fleet, Robb is actually a captive of the hydrogues for several years, with a handful of other humans. He and Tasia are later reunited when she is also captured, but they are saved by Tasia's own brother Jess and his force of wentals. Robb and Tasia soon defect the EDF in favor of the Confederation under King Peter, who puts them in charge of his military forces.
General Conrad Brindle	Retired EDF officer brought back into service during the war against the hydrogues, and promoted to General. He is overjoyed to find his son Robb alive, but refuses to defect from the EDF when Robb does.
Patrick Fitzpatrick III	Spoiled and arrogant grandson of the former Hansa Chairman Maureen Fitzpatrick. Disdainful of the scrappy Roamer recruit Tasia Tamblyn, Patrick does not excel as an EDF cadet himself, but his family connections put him on the fast track to becoming an officer. Early in his career he does General Lanyan's dirty work and destroys an "inconvenient" Roamer vessel and its crew; this is the first in a series of Hansa and EDF actions that alienate the Roamers and smaller colonies. Patrick is left for dead when the EDF are defeated by hydrogues at Osquivel, but he and several of his comrades are rescued by Roamers from a hidden shipyard in the area. The shipyard's owner, Del Kellum, reluctantly refuses to let the EDF survivors leave in order to protect the location of his secret facility. Resentful of their captivity, Patrick and his comrades and uncooperative and look for a means of escape, but he slowly begins to admire the hardworking Roamers and realize how he has been deceived by the misguided Hansa. Patrick and Del's daughter Zhett share mutual animosity and attraction; he soon realizes he would be happy to stay at Osquivel and work with the Roamers, but he reluctantly uses his connection to Zhett to effect his escape for the good of the other EDF captives. Patrick's grandmother coincidentally arrives with an invading EDF force; he brokers freedom for the Romaers, who flee the system. Patrick later tracks down Zhett and her father to apologize for his part in the attack on the Roamer ship years before. Zhett ultimately forgives him, and the two begin an active resistance against the corrupt Hansa and EDF.
Admiral Sheila Willis	Admiral of the Grid 7 battle fleet, fiercely loyal to the EDF and Hansa until she begins to see that they are out of control. Willis executes the harsh Yreka blockade, and later barely escapes with some of her ships during the Soldier compy revolt. She assists the remaining EDF forces against the hydrogue attack on Earth in the Juggernaut Jupiter, and is later given the command of ten Manta Cruisers to quash Peter's rebellion on Theroc after command of the Jupiter is passed to General Lanyan. Willis defects to the Confederation after refusing to kill civilians on Rhejak.
Admiral Lev Stromo	Grid Zero Admiral of the EDF; despite his success quelling an uprising on Ramah, he is nicknamed "Stay at home Stromo" after suffering a major loss to the hydrogues. He has more success leading EDF battleships against the Roamer headquarters of Rendezvous after the Roamers are denounced as outlaws. Despite making it to the launch bay of his Juggernaut during the Soldier compy revolt, he is ambushed and killed.
Elly Ramirez	Navigator on Tasia Tamblyn's Manta until she is promoted to commander of the vessel upon Tamblyn's reassignment to the EDF base on Mars. While Admiral Stromo lead raids against Roamers from Ramirez's cruiser, he lets Ramirez give the general orders in situations of conflict. She perishes aboard Admiral Stromo's Juggernaut during the Soldier compy uprising.
Anwar Zizu	Security chief on board the Manta cruiser commanded by Tasia Tamblyn.
Colonel Shelia Andez	Weapons specialist captured by Roamers at Osquivel; after being freed she becomes the leader of a radical EDF clean up crew against rebels.

==== Citizens ====
Character	Description
Margaret Colicos	Xenoarchaeologist who, with her husband Louis, is famed for exploring many of the abandoned Klikiss worlds, and for the discovery of the Klikiss torch. The use of this alien technology in Hidden Empire to ignite the gas giant Oncier and create a new sun destroys a hidden civilization of hydrogues and sets off the war with the elemental race. Later, while exploring an abandoned Klikiss complex on the planet Rheindic Co, the couple are attacked by their previously docile Klikiss robot attendants. Margaret escapes through a newly discovered transportal as Louis is killed and their compy DD is abducted by the robots. Later in the series it is revealed that she is a prisoner of the returned Klikiss race, who are amassing their forces and preparing to reclaim their planets. Margaret's knowledge of the Klikiss had helped her communicate with the insects and use the unique song in her music box to placate them; though terrified and subjugated, she is left alive to coexist with them for years. Margaret is reunited with DD, and when the Klikiss retake their planet Llaro she acts as an unofficial liaison and translator between the invading Klikiss and the captive human colony.
Louis Colicos	Famed xenoarchaeologist and husband of Margaret Colicos; among their many expeditions are the investigation of Noctis Labyrinthus on Mars as well as excavations on Klikiss worlds such as Llaro, Pym, Corribus and Rheindic Co. They discover the Klikiss torch technology on Corribus, and the transportal technology on Rheindic Co; Margaret escapes through a transportal when their Klikiss robots attack and kill Louis.
Anton Colicos	Son of Margaret and Louis Colicos, a historian and academic who is the first human from the Hansa to be allowed to study the Ildiran epic the Saga of the Seven Suns.
Rlinda Kett	After losing one of her ships (and its captain) to Roamer pirate Rand Sorengaard, trader Rlinda Kett helps the EDF capture Sorengard at Yreka, using a ship piloted by her ex-husband Branson "BeBob" Roberts as bait. With the assistance of the ambitious Sarein, daughter of the Mother and Father of Theroc, Rlinda secures a trade agreement for Theron's exotic food and textiles. Her first shipment of these luxury items is soon purchased by the Ildiran Prime Designate Jora'h when she transports the green priests Otema and Nira Khali to Ildira for study of the Saga of Seven Suns. As the hydrogue war begins, Rlinda's small fleet of ships is conscripted by the EDF, except for her own vessel, the Voracious Curiosity. Hansa Chairman Basil Wenceslas asks Rlinda to transport his agent Davlin Lotze in his search for the missing xenoarchaeologists Margaret and Louis Colicos. They find traces of the scientists on Rheindic Co and explore; Davlin steps through the Klikiss transportal discovered by the Colicos, and vanishes. When he finds his way back many days later, Rlinda is still waiting for him with food and water. They return to Earth and report the existence of the transportal system to the Hansa. A colonization effort using the transportals is soon underway, and Rlinda is contracted to transport heavy machinery too big to be transferred through the Klikiss portals. She enlists the help of BeBob — who had deserted his forced conscription into the EDF after years of dangerous service — with the approval of the Chairman, who agrees not to alert the EDF. Rlinda and BeBob help Davlin evacuate the population of Crenna when that planet's sun is extinguished by a battle between the hydrogues and faeros. Soon after, BeBob is caught and arrested by the EDF, and General Lanyan condemns him to death as a traitor to set an example. Though Basil refuses to intervene, Rlinda and Davlin manage to effect BeBob's escape. Rlinda and BeBob flee, but are captured at Plumas by Roamer pirates.
Branson "BeBob" Roberts	Pilot in Rlinda Kett's merchant fleet, as well as the last (and favorite) of her five ex-husbands. BeBob cooperates with the EDF by acting as bait for Roamer pirates at Yreka; as the hydrogue war escalates, BeBob is conscripted into the EDF as a scout to investigate known hydrogue worlds. After many dangerous missions he decides to retire and settle on Crenna, though doing so is technically desertion. He later joins Rlinda in her efforts to deliver large machinery and supplies to new colonies on newly discovered Klikiss worlds. Rlinda and BeBob help Davlin evacuate the population of Crenna when that planet's sun is extinguished by a battle between the hydrogues and faeros. Resuming his transport of supplies for the new colonization effort, BeBob arrives at Corribus to find that the settlement there has been destroyed. He rescues the lone survivors, Hud Steinmann and Orli Covitz. Delivering them to safety at the EDF base on Mars, BeBob is arrested, and General Lanyan condemns him to death as a traitor to set an example. Though Chairman Wenceslas refuses to intervene at Rlinda's request, she and Davlin manage to effect BeBob's escape. Rlinda and BeBob flee, but are captured at Plumas by Roamer pirates.
Jan Covitz	Eccentric and eternally optimistic colonist who leaves the planet Dremen with his daughter Orli to settle on the former Klikiss world of Corribus. After the Klikiss robots seize control of a battle group of EDF ships, they come to reclaim Corribus, scouring the human settlement there and killing nearly all of the colonists, including Jan.
Orli Covitz	Young but talented musician, daughter of Jan Covitz. She and her father emigrate to the former Klikiss world of Corribus, which is subsequently attacked and sterilized by the Klikiss robots. Orli is one of only two survivors of the attack; she and Hud Steinmann are later rescued and sent to Llaro along with refugees from Crenna.
Hud Steinmann	Older colonist who settles on the former Klikiss world of Corribus, but lives on his own apart from the main settlement. When the colony is attacked and destroyed by the Klikiss robots, Hud and Orli are the only survivors. A crafty man, Hud is able to collect enough materials and supplies from the wreckage to help them survive until rescue arrives months later.
William Andeker	Earth scientist on Earth who attempts to learn the secrets of the Klikiss robots by capturing the one designated Jorax and dissecting it. Andeker suspects no threat from Jorax, as the black robots are known to be passive, despite their size. As the dissection commences, however, the robot easily breaks himself free and proceeds to tear the scientist to pieces. Jorax confesses his actions to the Hansa King Frederick and his court, stating that Andeker had triggered hidden defensive systems within the amnesiac robot upon attempted dissection.
Gabriel Mesta	Captain of the trader ship Great Expectations, part of Rlinda Kett's small fleet, who is killed by the Roamer pirates led by Rand Sorengaard.
Dr. Gerald Serizawa	Enthusiastic scientist in charge of the application of the Klikiss torch at Oncier; he is killed when the angered hydrogues return to the planet and destroy the Hansa observation station where he is based.
Rita Aguerra	Mother of Raymond Aguerra/King Peter, killed in an explosion engineered on the orders of Basil Wenceslas as a means to gain control of Peter.
Rory, Carlos and Michael Aguerra	Younger brothers of Raymond Aguerra/King Peter, killed in an explosion engineered on the orders of Basil Wenceslas. At the end of Metal Swarm (2007) after Peter has defected from the Hansa to create his own government, Basil introduces the world to Peter's replacement, "King Rory", who strongly resembles Peter's deceased brother. Suspicious but not sure of the truth, Peter surreptitiously collects some of Rory's DNA and has it tested, calling Basil's bluff and revealing that Rory is not his brother.
Backstory
Esteban Aguerra	Father of Raymond Aguerra/King Peter, who had left his family and fled Ramah years before the events of Hidden Empire (2002). After converting to Islam, changing his name to Abdul Mohammed Ahmani and starting a new family, he had been killed on the orders of Basil Wenceslas to leave no loose ends from Peter's former life.
Madeleine Robinson	Early planet prospector who, with her two sons, rediscovered the abandoned Klikiss world of Llaro.

=== Therons ===
In the series, the most prominent human world aside from Earth is Theroc, a planet covered in semi-sentient worldtrees that is quietly independent from the Hansa. Theroc's "green priests" are able to commune with the trees and communicate telepathically across space when touching a treeling, making them indispensable for instantaneous communication across the galaxy.

==== Green priests ====
Character	Description
Beneto	Second-born child of the Father and Mother of Theroc, destined to become a green priest. Wanting only to help humanity in any way possible, he chooses an unglamorous post on a backwater planet rather than securing a prominent position as would be possible with his family connections. As the war with the hydrogues (and then faeros) rages, it is revealed that the worldtrees are themselves an elemental race called the verdani, ancient enemies of the hydrogues. Beneto is killed in an attack on Corvus Landing, but is subsequently reborn as a golem avatar of the verdani. When a fleet of ancient verdani treeships arrives, Beneto permanently merges with one of them as its pilot, but not before working with the Roamer Jess Tamblyn to merge worldtrees with a fourth elemental race, the wentals, to create an additional fleet of treeships. The verdani forces set off from Theroc to fight the hydrogue threat elsewhere, and Beneto himself leads a cavalry force to Earth, assisting the remnants of the EDF and Ildirans in fighting the hydrogues and Klikiss robots. Later, when the faeros subvert the Ildiran thism to attack and destroy the treeships from within, infected Beneto leads himself and other afflicted treeships into a black hole to nullify the threat to the rest of the worldtrees.
Otema	Aged green priest and Theron ambassador to Earth, Otema is a congenial woman but staunch in her opposition to expanding the Hansa's access to green priests; she does not trust Chairman Wenceslas' motives, and does not want her priests used unduly. Basil manages to have her replaced as ambassador by his ambitious protégée Sarein, the daughter of Theron's rulers whom he believes will be more receptive to his desires. Otema is subsequently sent to Ildira for the prestigious task of studying the Ildiran Saga of Seven Suns and read it to the worldtrees. Otema is killed when Mage Imperator Cyroc'h abducts Nira Khali for his secret breeding program.
Nira Khali	Young green priest who travels to Ildira with Otema to study the epic Saga of Seven Suns; she becomes romantically involved with the Ildiran Prime Designate Jora'h, and attracts the notice of his father, Mage Imperator Cyroc'h. Seeing the potential of the green priest's psychic connection to the worldtrees, Cyroc'h abducts her and forces her to participate in his secret breeding program. He tells his son Jora'h that Nira was killed in a fire. Already pregnant with Jora'h's child, Nira gives birth to their daughter Osira'h, who is immediately taken from her. Nira is subsequently held in a breeding camp on Dobro for years and raped by various Ildiran kithmen, producing four more living mixed-breed children: Rod'h, Gale'nh, Tamo'l and Muree'n. Rod'h is the son of Jora'h's brother Udru'h, the administrator of the breeding program, and Gale'nh's father is the famed Ildiran military commander, Adar Kori'nh. Jora'h eventually succeeds his father as Mage-Imperator and discovers the truth of Nira's abduction, but Udru'h hides Nira and tells Jora'h that she had died at the camp. Udru'h later admits his ruse, but when he seeks to free Nira, he finds that she has escaped. Nira is eventually found, and reunited with her children. The rest of the breeding camp's inhabitants are also freed, but a demonstration gone awry causes chaos and death in the nearby Ildirian settlement. Jora'h arrives and he and Nira are also reunited. She returns to Ildira as his consort.
Celli	Youngest child of the Mother and Father of Theroc. With no set role to fulfill in the Theron society, she has a carefree childhood, but the war with the hydrogues forces her to mature dramatically. A trained tree dancer, her life is saved by the young green priest Solimar as they help the victims of the battle between the faeros and the hydrogues. During the effort to rebuild the worldforest after the attack, Celli stumbles across the verdani form of her brother Beneto, thought killed but instead reborn as an avatar of the worldtrees. Celli soon decides to become a green priest herself.
Solimar	Young green priest with who saves Celli's life, and with whom she becomes romantically involved.
Nahton	Court green priest at Earth's Whisper Palace after the forced retirement of Otema as Theron ambassador. As Chairman Wenscelas becomes increasingly irrational, Nahton is resistant to aid Basil in his machinations, instead siding with (and supplying vital information to) King Peter and a conflicted Sarein. After the escape of King Peter and Queen Estarra to Theroc, Basil has Nahton's treeling confiscated for his insubordination. With an attack by the EDF planned for Theroc, Sarein and Captain McCammon plot to give Nahton access to his treeling to warn Peter; the plan is successful, but Nahton is subsequently slain by Silver Beret guards on Basil's orders.
Yarrod	Younger brother of Mother Alexa and a senior green priest, he serves as the leader of the green priests that volunteer to serve on EDF vessels. Later he returns to Theroc to help heal the worldforest after the hydrogue-faero attack.
Arcas	Insular Theron who becomes a green priest not out of any interest of his own, but because of his father's dying wish. He volunteers to assist xenoarchaeologists Margaret and Louis Colicos with their exploration of the remote planet Rheindic Co. There, Arcas discovers a previously hidden Klikiss city, but is killed by three Klikiss robots who seek to keep the secret of Klikiss transportal technology from being known.
Kolker	Talkative green priest who serves on board the Hansa skymine at Qronha 3; he becomes friends with the manager of the facility, Sullivan Gold. Kolker's potted treeling is destroyed during a hydrogue attack on the skymine, and he soon begins to suffer severe withdrawal symptoms without access to telink. Kolker and the other survivors of the attack are kept under house arrest by Mage-Imperator Jora'h on Ildira to protect the secret of Jora'h's negotiations with the hydrogues, which only heightens Kolker's anxiety. He befriends an aged Lens kithman Tery'l, who teaches him about the Ildiran thism. Kolker is eventually able to reconnect to the worldforest, but does not feel as fulfilled by it as he had before. He seeks out Tery'l for advice, but the old Lens kithman is dying. Tery'l gives Kolker his lightsource medallion as he dies, and Kolker realizes that while telink only unites green priests, thism unites the entire Ildirian race. With the help of the half human/half Ildiran telepath Osira'h and her half siblings, Kolker finds a connection between telink and thism which he is able to pass onto other humans. The faeros later talk advantage of this connection, however, and destroy the humans linked by it.
Rossia	Volunteer green priest that volunteers to serve for EDF; he walks with a pronounced limp from surviving an attack by a vicious wyvern on Theroc. He dies during the Soldier compy revolt when his commanding general destroys their own Juggernaut to wipe out the treacherous Soldier compies — and human crew — aboard.

==== Royal family ====
Character	Description
Reynald	Oldest child of Alexa and Idriss, Mother and Father of Theroc, and heir to the title. He visits Earth and Ildira to learn about their differences from Therons and open new avenues of communication and collaboration, and also arranges a secret meeting with the Roamer Speaker Jhy Okiah and her protégée Cesca Peroni. The insular Roamers decline a proposed alliance, but Reynald asks Cesca to consider marrying him and becoming the Mother of Theroc. When Reynald accedes the throne, Cesca is the new Speaker of the Roamers and belatedly accepts his proposal for the good the alliance will bring — even though she is in love with someone else. But before they can be married, Reynald is killed when the hydrogues and faeros clash on Theroc.
Sarein	Third child of Alexa and Idriss, the ambitious Sarein had been educated on Earth and became the protégée and lover of Hansa Chairman Wenceslas. She is promoted to Theron ambassador to Earth when Otema is forced to retire by Basil. Sarein volunteers to marry King Peter to cement relations between the Hansa and Theroc, but her sister Estarra is chosen instead. Initially loyal to Basil, Sarein sees his increasingly irrational behavior and tries to steer him back on the right path. Eventually she is convinced that he is out of control, but fears crossing him or escaping, not only because of what harm he may do to herself or Estarra, but also because of what else Basil might do if she is not there to stop him.
Estarra	Fourth oldest child of the Father and Mother of Theroc. She marries King Peter of the Hansa to secure an alliance with Theroc; they soon fall in love and realize that they can only trust each other in the dangerous political arena of the Whisper Palace.
Alexa and Idriss	Former Mother and Father of Theroc who retire and are succeeded by their son Reynald; he is subsequently killed, forcing them back into power. They later pass their titles on to their daughter Estarra and her husband Peter, the King and Queen of the new Confederation.
Lia and Uthair	Former Mother and Father of Theroc; years before the events of Hidden Empire they retired in favor of their daughter Alexa and her husband Idriss.

=== Roamers ===
In the series, the Roamers are clans of industrious humans living a clandestine existence in the fringes of space, managing a profitable economy centered on the sale of the valuable stardrive fuel ekti and other commodities.

Character	Description
Ross Tamblyn	Eldest son of Bram and Karla Tamblyn, disowned by his father before the events of Hidden Empire. Ross had started his own business running the Blue Sky Mine at Golgen, an ekti collection facility. As the series begins he is engaged to Francesca "Cesca" Peroni, who had agreed to marry him if he managed to make a profit on his skymine within five years. However, Ross is killed when the skymine is attacked by hydrogues; as he is one of their first human victims, the hydrogues adopt his likeness whenever they interact with humans.
Jess Tamblyn	Second son of the Tamblyns, a pilot for the family water business on Plumas. He and his brother Ross' fiancée Cesca Peroni are in love, but resist their attraction out of respect for Ross. Even when Ross is killed, they allow a mourning period before they are willing to be together. Then Cesca becomes engaged to Reynald of Theroc for political reasons, and Jess makes first contact with the ancient elemental race, the wentals. Jess is attacked by hydrogues, and the wentals save his life by merging with him, which makes him impervious to harm but also deadly to human touch. Jess seeks the help of other Roamers to spread the wentals to aquatic planets as a means to strengthen the elementals for battle against the hydrogues. Jess is reunited with Cesca but cannot touch her, though Reynald has been killed and she is free. Later, Cesca is mortally injured and Jess convinces the wentals to save her the same way they saved him; Jess and Cesca can finally touch each other, but they are no longer human. Brought into the war with their ancient enemies the hydrogues and faeros, the wentals are ultimately able to withdraw themselves from Jess and Cesca, who are finally together and restored to normal.
Tasia Tamblyn	Youngest child and only daughter of Bram and Karla Tamblyn; Ross' death drives her to join the Earth Defense Forces to fight the hydrogues. As a Roamer she is initially marginalized by her fellow recruits, but Tasia proves herself and ultimately rises in the ranks.
Bram Tamblyn	Tamblyn clan patriarch, eldest of five brothers and head of the family water mines on Plumas. A widower, he had disowned his eldest child Ross before the events of Hidden Empire, but is devastated to hear of his death in a hydrogue attack. Soon after, Bram himself dies of a heart attack.
Karla Tamblyn	Wife of Bram Tamblyn and mother to his children, she had died in an accident years before the events of Hidden Empire, frozen in an underwater crevasse on Plumas. When Jess unknowingly leaves a trace of wental energy on Plumas, it becomes corrupted and seeps into Karla's long-lost frozen body and reanimates her. With only a touch of Karla's consciousness and possessed by the tainted wental, she induces native giant nematodes to attack the water mine workers as she begins destroying the facility with wental energy. She is later stopped by Jess, but not before killing several people, including one of Bram's brothers.
Cesca Peroni	Daughter of Roamer trader Denn Peroni and protégée of Roamer Speaker Jhy Okiah, as the series begins she is engaged to Ross Tamblyn but in love with his brother Jess. They resist their attraction out of respect for Ross; even when Ross is killed, they allow a mourning period before they are willing to be together. Then Cesca becomes engaged to Reynald of Theroc for political reasons; Jess' life is saved by the alien wentals, but the process makes him deadly to human touch. Jess and Cesca are reunited but cannot touch each other, though Reynald has been killed and Cesca is free. Later, Cesca is mortally injured and Jess convinces the wentals to save her the same way they saved him; Jess and Cesca can finally touch each other, but they are no longer human. With Jhy dead, Cesca becomes Speaker of the Roamers. Brought into the war with their ancient enemies the hydrogues and faeros, the wentals are ultimately able to withdraw themselves from Jess and Cesca, who are finally together and restored to normal.
Denn Peroni	Roamer trader and the father of Cesca Peroni; he is held by the Hansa at the EDF base on Mars as Chairman Wenceslas plans to assassinate King Peter and Queen Estarra, so that Denn and all Roamers can be used as scapegoats. However, the bomb planted by Pellidor is discovered and King Peter manages to quietly release Denn. Peroni is later enlisted by Cesca to lead a convoy of Roamer ships to Theroc to help the planet rebuild after a hydrogue attack. When the Hansa declares all Roamers to be outlaws, he is part of the secret convocation at Osquivel where the Roamers agree to covertly sell their products to beleaguered Hansa colonies and the Ildiran Empire. Denn helps set up a makeshift hub market at Yreka, and later assists Kotto Okiah in both the manufacture of his anti-hydrogue "Doorbell" weaponry and also deploying the devices against the hydrogues at Earth. Denn is later assigned as the official liaison between the Roamers and the new Confederation by King Peter, and has the title of Speaker passed to him by Cesca.
Jhy Okiah	Speaker of the Roamer clans as the series begins, Jhy is training her protégée Cesca Peroni to succeed her. She is remarkably old, having married four times and outlived each of her husbands, yet retaining much of her wisdom and enthusiasm. Saved by Cesca from the destruction of the Roamer capital satellite Rendezvous by the EDF, Jhy dies peacefully on the Roamer outpost Jonah 12, shortly before the complex is annihilated by Klikiss robots.
Kotto Okiah	Jhy Okiah's son and an engineer of remarkable creative skill, even by Roamer standards. Kotto notably manages to set up colonies in the extreme environments of Isperos and Jonah 12, and implements several improvements for Roamer skymines. He and Denn Peroni help the Therons rebuild after a hydrogue attack, and Kotto conceives what he calls the "Doorbell", a sonic vibration device useful as a weapon against the hydrogues. Using a particular sound frequency, the device is able to open the door of a hydrogue warglobe, releasing the high pressure and effectively killing the hydrogues inside. He later designs and implements weaponry for existing Roamer spacecraft as a new defensive fleet for the Confederation.
Berndt Okiah	One of Jhy Okiah's numerous grandchildren, a dedicated Roamer skyminer who manages facilities at Glyx and then Erphano before he is killed in a hydrogue attack.
Del Kellum	Owner of the secret Roamer shipyards located in the rings of Osquivel; after a failed EDF battle in the area, Del and his people save several EDF soldiers left behind, including Patrick Fitzpatrick III. Trying to keep the location of the shipyards secret, Del reluctantly keeps the EDF survivors as unwilling "guests." They are ultimately liberated by Patrick's own grandmother Maureen Fitzpatrick, but Patrick — having a newfound respect for the Roamers — negotiates the Roamers' escape from the system. With the Osquivel facility destroyed, Del begins operating a skymine around Golgen, the first world to be made safe from hydrogues by the wentals.
Zhett Kellum	Beautiful, dark-haired and spirited daughter of Del Kellum, she and Patrick Fitzpatrick III share mutual animosity and attraction. Though Patrick realizes he would be happy to stay at Osquivel and work with the Roamers, he reluctantly uses his connection to Zhett to effect his escape for the good of the other EDF captives. He later tracks down Zhett and her father to apologize for his part in an early attack on a Roamer ship years before. Zhett ultimately forgives him, and the two begin an active resistance against the corrupt Hansa and EDF.
Eldon Clarin	Engineer who helped design the Roamer facility Hurricane Depot as well as an improved ekti reactor; he is monitoring the progress of the newly installed reactor on Berndt Okiah's skymine at Erphano when it is destroyed by the hydrogues.
Roberto Clarin	Manager of Hurricane Depot at the time of its seizure and destruction by the EDF.
Nikko Chan Tylar	Roamer pilot of the Aquarius who works mostly with the Tamblyn water operations; he later aids Jess Tamblyn in distributing wentals around the galaxy.
Crim and Marla Chan Tylar	Nikko's parents run the Chan Greenhouses, a small Roamer outpost which is later destroyed by an EDF battlegroup commanded by Admiral Lev Stromo. Nikko manages to escape the invasion, but both Crim and Marla are relocated to an EDF "refugee" camp on an abandoned Klikiss world. The Klikiss return, killing the EDF overseers and saving the remaining humans for eventual assimilation. Marla later dies and is assimilated during an escape attempt.

== Ildirans ==
In the series, the Ildiran Empire has existed for over ten thousand years, living peacefully due to a communal mental interconnectedness called the thism. Each Ildiran has what is called a soulthread, and these soulthreads are woven together by their leader, the Mage-Imperator. Ildirans have a very specialized society, with specific castes that are adept at performing particular tasks. The castes are physically different from one another, and have different suffixes at the end of their names. Ildirans are the first extraterrestrials that humanity encounters upon exploring space beyond Earth, and the Ildirans share their stardrive technology with humans.

=== Nobles ===
Character	Description
Cyroc'h	Ildiran Mage-Imperator at the beginning of the series, and successor of Yura'h. Cyroc'h holds the devotion of his people through his control of the thism, and will stop at nothing to protect and preserve the Ildrian race. In Hidden Empire, he fears that his heir, Prime Designate Jora'h, may not be strong enough to make the ruthless decisions required to lead the Ildirans, though he knows he is partly responsible since he has kept Jora'h in the dark about some of the empire's most sinister secrets. Cyroc'h kills the Rememberer Dio'sh when he discovers information about an ancient war censored by a previous Mage-Imperator, and also murders the medical kithmen who know that he is dying of an incurable tumor. His calculating second son Udru'h shares these and another dark Ildiran secret: the existence of a generations-long breeding program mating captive humans with Ildirans, seeking a telepath that can communicate with the hydrogues. Recognizing the potential of the green priest Nira Khali's psychic connection to the worldtrees, Cyroc'h has Udru'h abduct her and force her to participate in the breeding program telling Jora'h that she died in a fire. When Jora'h discovers that Nira is alive, Cyroc'h poisons himself; he knows that when Jora'h becomes Mage-Imperator he will understand the essential nature of the breeding program.
Jora'h	Eldest son of the Mage-Imperator Cyroc'h and Prime Designate of the Ildiran Empire. He is more benevolent than his father and many Mage-Imperators before him, but is challenged by the realities of the Ildiran Empire, their dark history and the hydrogue threat. He falls in love with the Theron green priest Nira Khali, but their relationship is tested by Cyroc'h's machinations.
Udru'h	Second born son of Cyroc'h, and therefore the assigned designate for the dreary planet Dobro. Intelligent but cold, Udru'h shares his father's view on what must be done to preserve the Ildrian race, and manages the secret breeding program on Dobro.
Rusa'h	Third born son of Cyroc'h, and the designate for the pleasure world Hyrillka. After he almost dies in a hydrogue attack, he is reawakened to believe he is meant to "save" the Ildrians from Jora'h's influence. He forces followers into his command by drugging them with shiing and securing them with his own form of thism, and then incites a bloody rebellion, brutally killing thousands to force Jora'h to capitulate to his demands. He is joined by Jora'h's own son and Prime Designate, Thor'h.
Avi'h	Youngest son of Cyroc'h and the designate of the resort world of Maratha. He maintains his position as designate after the accession of Jora'h to Mage-Imperator as Jora'h did not have time to father enough noble born sons before the death of Cyroc'h for Maratha to have a designate-in-waiting. When the complex at Maratha Prime is mysteriously disable, Avi'h flees with visiting human Anton Colicos and Rememberer Vao'sh to Maratha Secda, an alternate site under construction, but is killed by Klikiss robots upon arrival.
Thor'h	First-born son of Jora'h, his Prime Designate and the next Mage-Imperator of the Ildiran Empire. Thor'h's pampered upbringing on Hyrillka leaves him spoiled and addicted to the pleasure drug shiing. Devoted to his indulgent uncle, the Hyrillka designate Rusa'h, Thor'h is easily bent to Rusa'h's will when the Hyrillka designate awakes from a coma and decides to rebel against Jora'h's rule.
Yazra'h	Noble-born daughter of Jora'h, she prefers to spend her time among warrior kithmen rather than nobles. Jora'h assigns her as his personal bodyguard when he becomes Mage-Imperator, which provokes an uproar among orthodox Ildirans. She later accompanies Rememberer Vao'sh and Anton Colicos to Hyrillka to act as mentor to young Ridek'h, who is accelerated into the position of Hyrillka designate by the murder of designate-in-waiting Pery'h by Rusa'h. Yazra'h is also the owner of three well-trained Isix cats, large and vicious felines who can attack on command.
Pery'h	Third-born noble son of Jora'h, he is the Hyrillka Designate-in-waiting after Jora'h becomes Mage-Imperator. He is murdered by his uncle, Hyrillka Designate Rusa'h, when he refuses to join Rusa'h's rebellion.
Osira'h	Half-breed daughter of Jora'h and the human green priest Nira Khali, trained on Dobro by her uncle Udru'h to communicate telepathically with the hydrogues.
Ridek'h	Very young son of Pery'h who becomes Hyrillka Designate after Rusa'h rebels and Pery'h is killed.

=== Military officers ===
Character	Description
Adar Kori'nh	The Adar (supreme commander) of the Ildiran Solar Navy during the final years of Cyroc'h's reign as Mage-Imperator. He recognizes that the rigid and traditional ways of the millennia-old navy have slowly undermined its ability to effectively wage war. Kori'nh studies Earth military history vigorously and uses simplistic military games from Earth to test his commanders aptitude for battle. It is during one such test that he sees the potential and fresh thinking of Tal Zan'nh, the first-born son of the then Prime Designate Jora'h. He appoints Zan'nh his successor, and grooms his protégé accordingly. Kori'nh realizes that there is a lapse in the thism between the death of the Mage-Imperator Cyroc'h and the accession of his heir Jora'h, and uses this time without the Mage-Imperator's direct mental authority to plan a drastic attack on the hydrogues. He uses 49 warliners to ram and destroy 49 hydrogue warglobes, a suicidal victory that represents the greatest blow against the hydrogues yet in the war. With Kori'nh's heroic sacrifice to be celebrated in the epic The Saga of Seven Suns, Zan'nh becomes Adar of the Solar Navy.
Tal Zan'nh	First-born child of then Prime Designate Jora'h, though as a member of the Soldier kith, he is not Jora'h's heir. Zan'nh is a capable military officer and revolutionary thinker within the Solar Navy. This is demonstrated during a military exercise where Zan'nh's creative tactics prevailed over those of a traditional higher-ranking officer in a military exercise, his commander Adar Kori'nh recognizes his potential and necessity in the old and rigidly traditional Solar Navy. Zan'nh later becomes Adar after Kori'nh dies during a battle with the hydrogues. When his younger brother Thor'h, the Prime Designate, joins the open rebellion against their father Mage-Imperator Jora'h, Jora'h appoints Zan'nh as the new Prime Designate in Thor'h's place.
Qul Fan'nh	Commander of a maniple of Ildiran warliners who leads a defense against the hydrogues at Hrel-oro, losing two of his ships. Fan'nh later dies at Hyrillka when he is deceived by Thor'h.
Tal Lorie'nh	Commander of a cohort of warliners that are assigned to protect Ildira, he is sent with Adar Zan'nh to help defend Earth from a hydrogue attack.
Tal O'nh	High-ranking officer in the Ildiran Solar Navy, he had lost an eye in a long-ago in a starship explosion. O'nh is assigned to Hyrillka when new Designate Ridek'h is transported there; he later manages the evacuation of the planet when it becomes clear that the system's sun is becoming due to interference by the faeros. O'nh is killed buying time for others to leave the planet to save Mage-Imperator Jora'h.
Tal Ala'nh	Commander of a cohort of warliners that evacuate Hyrillka.
Backstory
Tal Bria'nh	Commander of a cohort of warliners who had dropped "sun bombs" upon the Shana Rei many millennia before the events of the series.

=== Other kiths ===
Character	Kith	Description
Bron'n	Soldier	Bodyguard to Mage-Imperator Cyroc'h, he sees to the more undesirable tasks Cyroc'h deems necessary, like the abduction of the green priest Nira and the murder of her companion Otema. Upon Cyroc'h's death, Bron'n commits an honorable suicide.
Dio'sh	Rememberer	Rememberer who sought information on the "Lost Times", a period of history unrecorded due to a supposed plague that wiped out an entire generation of Rememberers. Discovering facts about a deal made by an ancient Mage-Imperator with the hydrogues, he is murdered by Mage-Imperator Cyroc'h.
Vao'sh	Rememberer	High-ranking Rememberer and friend of human scholar Anton Colicos, sent to the resort colony of Maratha Prime during its long night season.
Ko'sh	Rememberer	Chief Scribe of the Rememberer kith; he is young, but unlike Vao'sh, has very orthodox views on The Saga of Seven Suns.
Ilure'l	Lens	Member of the Maratha Prime night season skeleton crew.
Tery'l	Lens	Old Lens kithman and friend to the green priest Kolker, whom he taught about the thism. He is mortally wounded by a falling hydrogue war globe.
Ari't	Singer	A lover of Prime Designate Jora'h.
Vik'k	Digger	One of the Ildirans from the Maratha Prime resort who survives the sabotage of the Klikiss robots of the transports the escapees were using to flee to Maratha Secda.
Syl'k and Mhas'k	Architectural	Mates who survive the sabotage of the transports on Maratha but are subsequently killed by giant ch'kanh plants.
Backstory
Vri'l and Tre'c	Swimmer and Scalie	Lovers in a story from the Saga of Seven Suns. Because the two could not stand each other's natural environments, Vri'l built her home on a raft in a seacove, and Tre'c built his home high up on the rocks. One day, however, there was a gigantic storm, which washed them both away.

== Artificial intelligence ==
Character	Description
DD	Friendly model compy (Competent Computerized Companion) belonging to the xenoarchaeologists Louis and Margaret Colicos; previously owned by the human girl Dahlia Sweeney and then her daughter Marianna. DD assists the Colicos in their exploration of the abandoned Klikiss planet Rheindic Co, along with the green priest Arcas and three Klikiss robots. When Louis and Margaret stumble upon a preserved Klikiss transportal and writings regarding the Klikiss robots' true history, the black robots kill Arcus and Louis before Margaret escapes through the transportal. DD is abducted by the Klikiss robot leader Sirix, who intends to study the compy and determine how to subvert the programming which prevents DD and other compies from inflicting harm on humans. Sirix upgrades DD's body to withstand the harsh environments in which the Klikiss robots had made their strongholds, including a moon with no atmosphere and a high-pressure hydrogue citysphere at the core of the gas giant Ptoro. There DD meets some of the hydrogues' human captives, including Robb Brindle. DD is next taken to the planet Corribus, where he must watch helplessly as Sirix and his Klikiss robots use stolen EDF warships to destroy the new human settlement there. Sirix next takes DD to Jonah 12, where a long-hidden cache of Klikiss robots is awakening. They have attacked the Roamer facility there and killed its inhabitants, but as Sirix and DD arrive the complex is destroyed by human sabotage and the Klikiss robots are wiped out. Sirix forces DD to help repair their damaged ship, and DD's attempt to strand Sirix in open space fails. The Klikiss robots finally manage to remove DD's restrictive programming, but instead of willingly joining their cause, DD escapes through a Klikiss transportal. He is reunited with Margaret Colicos, who has been a prisoner of the returned Klikiss race since her escape from Rheindic Co.
EA	Friendly compy belonging to the Tamblyn family; her last owner, Tasia Tamblyn, sends the compy on a secret mission to warn the hidden Roamer outpost at Osquivel of an impending Hansa mission to the area. EA is interrogated by Basil Wensceslas on her way back, and her memory self-erases. EA is later destroyed by Klikiss robots while a hostage of the hydrogues.
OX	Teacher compy and one of Earth's oldest robots, he is the instructor for all future kings of the Hansa. Protective of young King Peter, he begins to circumvent the orders of Basil Wenceslas as the Chairman's actions threaten Peter and the stability of the Hansa.
Sirix	Leader of the Klikiss robots. Discovered in hibernation millennia after the disappearance of the Klikiss race, these reawakened black robots are sophisticated and physically capable of performing various tasks but claim to possess no memory of their pasts. As Louis and Margaret Colicos stumble upon Klikiss transportal technology on Rheindic Co, the robots drop their ruse and seek to eliminate the xenoarchaeologists. Created by the Klikiss as a challenge in battle and domination, the black robots had risen up and destroyed the Klikiss. Now they are reawakening hidden caches of their kind to implement their long-planned goal of taking over the former Klikiss worlds. Though they do not see humans as a direct threat, they do not value human life and are willing to either use or destroy humanity to achieve their ends. Sirix engineers the mass-production by the Hansa of "superior" but secretly compromised Soldier compies; when these robots have been distributed across the entire EDF fleet, they are activated to subdue (and execute as necessary) the crews and seize the vessels, as well as the production facilities themselves on Earth.
Dekyk and Ilkot	Klikiss robot companions of Sirix on Rheindic Co.
Jorax	Klikiss robot residing on Earth; the scientist William Andeker attempts to learn the secrets of the Klikiss robots by capturing the Jorax and dissecting him. Andeker suspects no threat from Jorax, as the black robots are known to be passive, despite their size. As the dissection commences, however, the robot easily breaks himself free and proceeds to tear the scientist to pieces. Jorax confesses his actions to the Hansa King Frederick and his court, stating that Andeker had triggered hidden defensive systems within the amnesiac robot upon attempted dissection. Jorax requests that Frederick declare the Klikiss robots an independent, autonomous group that cannot be treated as property, which the King does. Later, the robot Sirix offers the secrets of the robots' construction to the Hansa to incorporate into the designs of new soldier compies for use by the EDF; Sirix's secret plan will allow for him to control these new compies at a future time when he can use their vast numbers to his advantage. Jorax offers himself up for dissection by the EDF scientists for this purpose.
