= The Fort Moxie Branch =

1988 short story by Jack McDevitt

"The Fort Moxie Branch" is a 1988 science fiction short story by Jack McDevitt. It was first published in the 1988 edition of the Full Spectrum anthology series from Bantam Spectra.

== Synopsis ==
A self-published author discovers a transdimensional library that collects the lost works of great authors.

== Reception ==
"The Fort Moxie Branch" was a finalist for the Nebula Award for Best Short Story of 1988 and the 1989 Hugo Award for Best Short Story.

Paul J. Nahin has described the librarians' mission as "one that [Ray] Bradbury would surely applaud", while Tom Easton has compared the library to "an Isher weapons shop".
