= Jack Grinnage =

American actor

- Born: Jack Eugene Stewart; January 20, 1931 (age 95); Los Angeles, California, U.S.
- Occupation: Actor
- Years active: 1954–2018

Jack Grinnage (born Jack Eugene Stewart, January 20, 1931) is a retired American actor with a film and television career spanning seven decades, including roles in Rebel Without a Cause (1955), King Creole (1958), and Kolchak: The Night Stalker (1975).

== Life and career ==
Born in Los Angeles, Grinnage made his first television appearances in 1954. The following year, he played Moose – one of three teenage rebels who chase James Dean – in Rebel Without a Cause (1955). Rebel Without a Cause was his first film where he received a screen credit.

Grinnage continued to play supporting roles or bit parts in films like King Creole (1958) with Elvis Presley (in a crucial role as a mute gang member), Spartacus (1960, his role went uncredited) and The Private Navy of Sgt. O'Farrell (1968). He also played an errant but sympathetic boy in the Twilight Zone episode “The Mind and the Matter”. In 1961, he appeared in the Broadway musical The Billy Barnes People.

Between 1974 and 1975, he had a supporting role as Independent News Service reporter Ron Updyke in the mystery series Kolchak: The Night Stalker. In 2009, Grinnage played the role of Marvell, the replacement janitor, in two episodes of Scrubs, “My Jerks” and “My Happy Place”, both of which aired in season 8. His most recent credit is the television series The Kids Are Alright (2018).

== Filmography ==
Film
Year	Title	Role	Notes
1955	Interrupted Melody	Corp. Michael Watkins	Uncredited
1955	Rebel Without a Cause	Moose	
1955	Lady Godiva of Coventry	Blacksmith's Son	Uncredited
1956	Crashing Las Vegas	Bellboy	Uncredited
1956	Gaby	Bit Role	Uncredited
1958	Wink of an Eye	Delivery Boy	
1958	King Creole	Dummy	
1958	Wolf Larsen	Leach	
1959	Riot in Juvenile Prison	Dink, an inmate	
1960	Spartacus	Petitioner	Uncredited
1963	A Ticklish Affair	Seaman	Uncredited
1963	Captain Newman, M.D.	Patient	Uncredited
1965	The Monster. Serie TV.	Mr.Walpole	
1968	The Private Navy of Sgt. O'Farrell	Pvt. Roberts	
1970	The Liberation of L.B. Jones	Driver	
1972	Glass Houses		
1978	Zero to Sixty	Airport Manager	
2009	Acts of Mercy		
Television
Year	Title	Role	Notes
1954	Father Knows Best	Claude	1 episode
1954	Meet Corliss Archer	Biltwell Salesboy	1 episode
1957-1958	The Silent Service	Editor Gaffney / Karley / Small Man	3 episodes
1958-1964	Wagon Train	Jubal Devlin / Sampson / Guard - Warren Mitchell	3 episodes
1959-1966	Gunsmoke	Gorman / Gus Blake / Raffie Bly / Andy Wirth	4 episodes
1961	The Twilight Zone	Henry	1 episode
1966	The Beverly Hillbillies	Co-pilot	1 episode
1969	Ironside	Movie Theatre Doorman	1 episode, Uncredited
1974	Crackle of Death	Ron Updyke	TV movie, (archive footage)
1974-1975	Kolchak: The Night Stalker	Ron Updyke	18 episodes
1978	Lou Grant	Clerk	1 episode
1983	Hotel	Tom Willis	
2003	Six Feet Under	Minister	1 episode
2009	Scrubs	Marvell	2 episodes
2013	Ghost Ghirls	Wally	1 episode
2018	The Kids Are Alright	Very Old Husband	1 episode
