= Richard Dean Starr =

American journalist

- Born: March 6, 1968 (age 58); Torrance, California, U.S.
- Occupations: Editor; Short story writer Screenwriter; Newspaper reporter Film critic Copywriter
- Writing career
- Genres: Suspense; Horror; Fantasy; Science fiction Westerns
- Website: richarddeanstarr.com

Richard Dean Starr (born March 6, 1968) is an American entrepreneur, editor, screenwriter, and author of fiction, comics, and graphic novels. He is also a former journalist and film critic who has written for newspapers and magazines.

Starr is also a copywriter and marketing consultant through Diamond Pacific Media Group. He is the co-founder and chief executive officer of Eread Technologies, Inc., which owns and is developing Ereading.com, eComicBooks.com, and other reading-centric domains.

== Biography ==
Starr was born in Torrance, California, but spent thirteen years in Florida. He returned to Los Angeles in 2006 and was named Special Projects Coordinator for Moonstone Books in 2007. Starr edited Tales of Zorro, the first anthology of original Zorro short fiction ever authorized by Zorro Productions, Inc. The second volume, More Tales of Zorro, was released in the summer of 2011. In 2016, Starr co-authored a comic book team-up featuring Kolchak: The Night Stalker and Dan Shamble, Zombie P.I. with New York Times bestselling author Kevin J. Anderson.

Starr has served as a judge for the International Association of Media Tie-In Writers 2009 Scribe Awards, awarded at the 2010 San Diego Comic-Con, and as a volunteer expert in the "Getting Published and E-Published" section of AllExperts.com since 2006.

== Works ==
=== Anthologies ===
Hellboy

- Hellboy: Odder Jobs (Dark Horse, 2004)

Zorro

- Tales of Zorro (Moonstone Books, 2009)
- More Tales of Zorro (Moonstone Books, 2011)

The Green Hornet

- The Green Hornet Case Files (Moonstone Books, 2012)
- The Green Hornet Chronicles (Moonstone Books, 2010)

Kolchak: The Night Stalker

- Kolchak: The Night Stalker: The Other (Big)Foot (with Matthew Baugh) (Moonstone Books, 2016)
- Kolchak: The Night Stalker Casebook (Moonstone Books, 2007)
- Kolchak: The Night Stalker Chronicles (Moonstone Books, 2005)

Sherlock Holmes

- Sherlock Holmes: Crossovers Casebook - Volume I (Moonstone Books, 2012)

The Lone Ranger

- The Lone Ranger and Tonto: Frontier Justice (Moonstone Books, 2016)
- The Lone Ranger Chronicles (Moonstone Books, 2012)

The Phantom

- The Phantom Chronicles 2 (Moonstone Books, 2010)
- The Phantom Chronicles (Moonstone Books, 2007)

The Avenger

- The Avenger Chronicles (Moonstone Books, 2008)

=== Other short fiction ===
- "Eat Your Heart Out" (R. Allen Leider's Hellfire Lounge, 2009)
- "Fear Itself" (Cemetery Dance magazine, Stephen King Halloween issue, 2005)

=== Graphic novels ===
- Wyatt Earp: The Justice Riders (Moonstone Books, 2008)

=== Comic books ===
- Kolchak: The Night Stalker and Dan Shamble, Zombie P.I.: Unnaturally Normal (with Kevin J. Anderson (Moonstone Books, 2016)
- Captain Action: The Complete Captain Action (as editor) (Moonstone Books, 2015)
- Captain Action: King Size Special #1 (as editor) (Moonstone Books, 2009)
- Captain Action: King Size Special #1 (A Variant) (as editor) (Moonstone Books, 2009)
- Captain Action: King Size Special #1 (B Variant) Variant Cover (as editor) (Moonstone Books, 2009)
- Captain Action: King Size Special #1 Variant Cover (as editor) (Moonstone Books, 2009)
- Captain Action Series Editor (with Matthew Baugh) (Moonstone Books, 2008)

=== As editor ===
- Sherlock Holmes: Crossovers Casebook - Volume II (Moonstone Books, 2016)
- More Tales of Zorro (Moonstone Books, 2011)
- Tales of Zorro (Moonstone Books, 2008)
- Sex, Lies and Private Eyes (Moonstone Books, 2008)
