= Crackle of Death =

- Genre: Comedy; Horror
- Directed by: Alexander Grasshoff; Don Weis
- Starring: Darren McGavin; Simon Oakland; Jack Grinnage; Carol Ann Susi
- Country of origin: United States
- Original language: English

Production
- Production location: Chicago
- Running time: 92 minutes
- Production companies: Universal Pictures; Universal Television

Original release
- Release: 1974

Crackle of Death is a 1974 film, the fourth produced in the Night Stalker film series.

It combined the Kolchak: The Night Stalker episodes "Firefall" and "The Energy Eater" with additional narration by Darren McGavin as Carl Kolchak. It also contains new dialogue by McGavin, Simon Oakland and Jack Grinnage, as well as new "scenes", such as a newspaper on a desk and the image of the doppelgänger being inserted into old footage (for example, when Kolchak looks at the sky, he sees the doppelgänger's giant face). The new material was put together in late March 1976.

Before Crackle of Death was a third movie entitled The Demon and the Mummy that combined two more episodes in a similar manner; namely, "Demon in Lace" and "Legacy of Terror".

All four episodes comprising these films were subsequently withdrawn from the original television syndication package. They were not made available in their entirety again until a Columbia House VHS video release in the 1990s. The TV-edited films have never been released on home video.

== See also ==
- List of Kolchak: The Night Stalker episodes
- The Night Stalker (1st movie): The original vampire story.
- The Night Strangler (2nd movie): A mad scientist achieves immortality through murderous means.
- The Night Killers (3rd unproduced movie): Aliens replace prominent citizens with androids in Hawaii.
