= The Private Navy of Sgt. O'Farrell =

1968 film by Frank Tashlin

- Theatrical release poster
- Directed by: Frank Tashlin
- Screenplay by: Frank Tashlin
- Story by: John L. Greene; Robert M. Fresco
- Produced by: John Beck
- Starring: Bob Hope; Phyllis Diller; Jeffrey Hunter
- Cinematography: Alan Stensvold
- Edited by: Eda Warren
- Music by: Harry Sukman
- Production company: John Beck-Naho Productions
- Distributed by: United Artists
- Release date: May 8, 1968
- Running time: 92 minutes
- Country: United States
- Language: English
- Box office: $2.4 million (US/ Canada)

The Private Navy of Sgt. O'Farrell is a 1968 American comedy film directed by Frank Tashlin and starring Bob Hope, Phyllis Diller, and Jeffrey Hunter. It was the final film for Tashlin, who died in 1972.

== Plot ==
Master Sergeant Dan O'Farrell is a G.I. on an island somewhere in the South Pacific during World War II, bemoaning the loss of a ship torpedoed while ferrying to the island a desperately needed cargo of beer.

Among his problems are the Navy personnel making life difficult for him and his Army buddies, an officer trying to emulate John Paul Jones, a hoped-for delivery of morale-boosting nurses turning out to be six men, the ugliest woman (Diller) ever to wilt a bouquet of flowers, and a Japanese soldier who has been hiding from everyone else and hiding something else as well.

== Cast ==
- Bob Hope as M/Sgt. Dan O'Farrell
- Phyllis Diller as Nurse Nellie Krause
- Jeffrey Hunter as Lt. (j.g.) Lyman P. Jones
- John Myhers as Lt. Cdr. Roger N. Snavely
- Mako as Calvin Coolidge Ishimura
- Henry Wilcoxon as RAdm. Arthur L. Stokes
- Dick Sargent as Capt. Elwood Prohaska
- Christopher Dark as Pvt. George Strongbow
- Michael Burns as Pvt. Johnny Bannon
- William Wellman Jr. as Cpl. Kennedy
- Robert Donner as Pvt. Ogg (USMC)
- Jack Grinnage as Pvt. Roberts
- William Christopher as Cpl. Jack Schultz (billed as a Pvt.)
- Mylène Demongeot as Gaby
- Gina Lollobrigida as Maria
- John Spina as Cpl. Miller (uncredited)
- Bing Crosby (archive footage from Pennies from Heaven) (uncredited)
- Edith Fellows (archive footage from Pennies from Heaven) (uncredited)

== Production ==
The film was an original story which was purchased by producer John Beck in 1965. He tried to set the project up at MGM, but after Bob Hope was attached, it was made via United Artists, where Hope had a deal in association with NBC. It was one of the last "A" pictures for Jeffrey Hunter.

The movie was filmed in Puerto Rico in 1967 with Hope at 64 years of age at the time; it was originally to have been filmed in Hawaii, but due to the activity during the Vietnam War, the US Department of Defense, which cooperated with the production, suggested the filming move to the Caribbean.

== Reception ==
Renata Adler of The New York Times gave an unfavourable review, complaining about "the endless progression of unfunny lines." Roger Ebert of the Chicago Sun-Times stated, ". . . the striking thing about "The Private Navy of Sgt. O'Farrell" is how completely it neglects the humorous possibilities of film," although he found enough good in the tight storytelling, Frank Tashlin's directing and Mako's performance to award two-and-a half stars. Variety said it was "okay, but crudely plotted" and "routinely directed." Leonard Maltin stated, "Of the many terrible Hope comedies of the 1960s, this may be the worst," and gave it his rock-bottom rating of BOMB.

== See also ==
- List of American films of 1968
