= Lou Aronica =

Science fiction editor, publisher, and author

Lou Aronica (born 1958) is an American editor and publisher, primarily of science fiction. He co-edited the Full Spectrum anthologies with Shawna McCarthy. As a publisher he began at Bantam Books and formed their Bantam Spectra science fiction and fantasy label. Later he moved on to Avon and helped create their Avon-Eos science fiction and fantasy label.

== Career ==
Aronica started the Spectra imprint at Bantam when he was 27 years old. His first acquisition for Bantam Spectra, David Brin's Startide Rising, won a Hugo and a Nebula award. Bantam Spectra went on to publish New York Times bestsellers for Arthur C. Clarke, Isaac Asimov, Margaret Weis, Tracy Hickman, Raymond Feist, William Gibson, Neal Stephenson, and Neil Gaiman. During this phase of his career, Aronica acquired five consecutive winners of the Nebula award.

His Full Spectrum anthology series ran 5 volumes. Full Spectrum 4, co-edited with Amy Stout and Betsy Mitchell, won the 1994 World Fantasy Award for Best Anthology. He also started the Star Wars book publishing program.

As mass market publisher for Bantam, he launched the Crime Line mystery imprint and worked with bestselling authors Elizabeth George, Robert Crais, and Diane Mott Davidson.

After leaving Bantam in 1994, he became publisher of the Berkley Publishing Group, where he started two imprints, Boulevard and Signature. During this time he acquired and edited futuristic mysteries by J.D. Robb (a pen name of author Nora Roberts).

In 1995, Aronica became senior vice president and publisher for Avon Books, where he launched the Eos science fiction and fantasy imprint and expanded Avon's romance books program. The author list at Eos has included Raymond Feist, Gregory Benford, Ben Bova, Sheri Tepper, and Dennis Danvers. He left Avon in 1999 after the acquisition of the company by The News Corporation.

Since leaving Avon, he has co-authored several books, including The Culture Code with Clotaire Rapaille. His novels The Forever Year and Flash and Dazzle were published under the pen name Ronald Anthony. In 2003, he established The Fiction Studio, a creative development company with a publishing imprint for new authors, and in 2008, with literary manager Peter Miller, he established The Story Plant, www.thestoryplant.com, a small commercial imprint for strong genre authors.

== Works ==
=== Books edited ===
- David Brin, Startide Rising (Bantam Spectra 1984)

=== Anthologies ===
The Bantam Spectra Sampler (1985)

The first four books of the Full Spectrum series:

- Full Spectrum (1988) with Shawna McCarthy
- Full Spectrum 2 (1989) with Shawna McCarthy and Amy Stout and Pat LoBrutto
- Full Spectrum 3 (1991) with Amy Stout and Betsy Mitchell
- Full Spectrum 4 (1993) with Amy Stout and Betsy Mitchell

=== Nonfiction books co-authored ===
- A Million Thanks (2005), with Shauna Fleming
- The Culture Code: An Ingenious Way to Understand Why People Around the World Live and Buy as They Do (2007), with Clotaire Rapaille
- Miraculous Health: How to Heal Your Body by Unleashing the Hidden Power of Your Mind (2008), with Dr. Rick Levy
- The Element: How Finding Your Passion Changes Everything (2009), with Sir Ken Robinson
- Conscientious Equity (2010), with Neal Ashbury
- Finding Your Element: How to Discover Your Talents and Passions and Transform Your Life (2013), with Sir Ken Robinson

=== Fiction books authored ===
- Blue (2011)
- The Forever Year, under pen name Ronald Anthony
- Flash and Dazzle (2007), under pen name Ronald Anthony
