= Gamearth Trilogy =

The Gamearth Trilogy is a series of sword and sorcery fantasy novels by Kevin J. Anderson, comprising Gamearth (1989), Gameplay (1989), and Game's End (1990). They are set in the world of Gamearth, which is a role-playing game campaign setting invented by four teenagers.

The Gamearth Trilogy was republished as Hexworld, comprising Roll, Play and End, all published in 2021 with some revisions and additional editing, noted by the author in the foreword of Roll.

== Plot summary ==
At the beginning of the trilogy, Scott, Tyrone, David and Melanie have been playing Gamearth for approximately 2 years. David has grown bored of the game and tries to convince the others that it is time to quit. When Melanie thwarts him, David decides that his characters will begin a war of conquest with the ultimate aim of destroying the world. Melanie then sends her characters on a quest to stop this.

What none of them know is that their characters have achieved sentience and want to control their own affairs. They look on the four players as gods, calling them the "Ruleslords" and "Ruleslady". When they come to understand that their players are conspiring to end the world, they begin to take their own steps to hurt the players in the real world.

== Characters ==
Many of the main characters are based on role-playing game stereotypes. They include:

- Delreal, a burly warrior.
- Vailret, Delreal's cousin. He is a meek scholar who hates adventuring and often curses the gods for making him do so.
- Bryl, a lazy, arrogant sorcerer.
- Sardun, a highly powerful, aristocratic and elderly sorcerer.

== Things of Power ==
- The Four Elemental Stones: the crystallized powers in the shape of die left behind after the (Sorcerers) Departed. If held by a magic-user, each stone can increase the spells per day of the holder by one, and increase the abilities geared toward the stone's element. When all four are gathered together by a sorcerer character and rolled with the highest possible point values, unforeseeable power is granted. They are the Air Stone (a 4 sided diamond), the Water Stone (a 6 sided sapphire), the Fire Stone (an 8 sided ruby) and the Earth Stone (a 10 sided emerald).
- Scartaris: possibly a character, the sentient plant was created by David to leach the life from the Game.
- The Cannon: a giant cannon developed by Professor Verne and requisitioned by the manticore's army as a method of fighting the Ruleslords/Lady.
- The Weapon: a device reminiscent of an atomic bomb, an experiment deemed failed by Professors Verne and Frankenstein, captured by the manticore's army at the same time as Professor Verne.
