= Kolchak: The Night Stalker =

American television series (1974–1975)

- Darren McGavin as Carl Kolchak
- Genre: Occult detective fiction
- Created by: Jeff Rice
- Starring: Darren McGavin; Simon Oakland; Jack Grinnage; Ruth McDevitt
- Theme music composer: Gil Mellé
- Composers: Bob Cobert (TV movies); Gil Mellé; Jerry Fielding; Greig McRitchie (one episode); Luchi De Jesus (one episode)
- Country of origin: United States
- No. of episodes: 20

Production
- Running time: 50–51 minutes
- Production companies: Francy Productions Inc.; Universal Television

Original release
- Network: ABC
- Release: September 13, 1974 – March 28, 1975

Related
- The Night Strangler; Night Stalker

Kolchak: The Night Stalker is an American television series that aired on ABC during the 1974–1975 season. The series followed wire service reporter Carl Kolchak (Darren McGavin) who investigates mysterious crimes with unlikely causes, particularly those involving the supernatural or science fiction, including fantastic creatures. The series was preceded by the two television movies, The Night Stalker (1972) and The Night Strangler (1973). Although the series lasted only a single season, it developed cult status in syndication.

Chris Carter cited Kolchak as a "tremendous influence" in creating his franchise The X-Files. In 2005, inspired by that success, The X-Files producer Frank Spotnitz resurrected the series as Night Stalker, but the new series was unable to compete with CBS's C.S.I. and was cancelled after only six of the ten episodes that had been produced were aired on ABC. The full ten-episode series was eventually aired on the Sci-Fi Channel in the summer of 2006. Several comics and novels based upon the original series have been published.

== Origins ==
=== The Night Stalker ===
The character originated in The Kolchak Papers, a novel written by Jeff Rice. In the novel and film, a Las Vegas newspaper reporter named Carl Kolchak (Darren McGavin) tracks down and defeats a serial killer who turns out to be the vampire Janos Skorzeny (Barry Atwater). The novel gives Kolchak's birth name as "Karel", although he uses the anglicized version "Carl". ABC approached Rice with an offer to option The Kolchak Papers, which was adapted by Richard Matheson into a television movie. At the time it was optioned for the screen, the novel was unpublished. The Night Stalker first aired January 11, 1972, and garnered the highest ratings of any television movie at that time (33.2 rating—54 share). Matheson received a 1973 Edgar Award from the Mystery Writers of America for Best TV Feature or Miniseries Teleplay.

=== The Night Strangler ===
Impressed by the success of the first television movie, ABC commissioned Richard Matheson to write a second movie, The Night Strangler (1973). A fictional version of Seattle Underground was used as a setting for much of the movie's action. Richard Anderson played the titular villain Dr. Richard Malcolm, and Darren McGavin and Simon Oakland reprised their roles as Carl Kolchak and Kolchak's editor, Tony Vincenzo, respectively.

=== Novel tie-ins ===
Following the success of the TV movie, the novel was published in 1973 by Pocket Books as a mass-market paperback original, titled The Night Stalker, with a photo of Darren McGavin on the cover in order to tie it to the film. Rice authored a novelization of The Night Strangler based on Matheson's screenplay. The novel was published in 1974 by Pocket Books as a mass-market paperback original. The books were republished in 2007 by Moonstone in an omnibus edition entitled The Kolchak Papers. Moonstone Books had been producing and publishing Kolchak comic books since 2002.

== Production ==
In late 1973, Matheson and William F. Nolan completed the script for an intended third television movie, to be titled The Night Killers, a story about android replicas. ABC decided that it wanted a weekly series instead.

After some negotiation, McGavin agreed to return as Kolchak and also served as the series' executive producer, though he was not credited as such. However, neither ABC nor Universal had obtained Jeff Rice's permission and he sued the studio. The suit was resolved shortly before the series aired in the fall 1974 season, replacing Toma on the network's Friday night schedule. Rice received an on-screen credit as series creator. The first four episodes aired under the title of The Night Stalker. After a month-long hiatus, the series was renamed and returned as Kolchak: The Night Stalker. The later home video releases of the television series also used that title.

While the show was set in Chicago and some generic location/background filming was done there in summer and early fall, the show was filmed primarily in Los Angeles and at Universal Studios.

Jimmy Sangster, known for having written some of the Hammer Horror films, wrote the episode "Horror in the Heights". The series provided the first professional writing credit for Robert Zemeckis and his writing partner Bob Gale, who wrote the script for the episode "Chopper". David Chase also worked on the series as a story editor, his first regular staff position in Hollywood. Though Chase is credited on eight episodes as story editor, he also helped rewrite the remaining 12. McGavin and others attribute much of the show's quirky humor to his creative input.

Kolchak: The Night Stalker was plagued with problems from the start, including budgetary issues and McGavin constantly struggling with the series' producer Cy Chermak over the direction. The show's ratings were mediocre and McGavin was growing dissatisfied, resulting in its cancellation after one year. The series aired on Friday nights at 10 p.m., a virtual graveyard for most TV series, particularly one aimed at a younger audience. In January 1975, the show was moved to Friday nights at 8 p.m., where it remained until June 1975. In August 1975, ABC moved Kolchak to Saturday nights at 8 p.m for four final weeks of reruns. McGavin found himself rewriting scripts and doing much of the work of a producer, but without getting either the full credit or the full compensation of one. McGavin had been unhappy with what he felt was the show's "monster of the week" direction, and an exhausting filming schedule. He asked to be released from his contract with two episodes remaining to be filmed, which the network granted in light of the show's dwindling ratings.

Two television movies, The Demon and the Mummy and Crackle of Death, were cobbled together in 1976. Each contains new footage as well as previously screened episodes from the series. McGavin provided a voice-over for both, which allowed the narrative to maintain some continuity.

The Kolchak series completely vanished after ABC's final repeat, which was the premiere episode "The Ripper", broadcast early September 1975. On May 25, 1979, The CBS Late Movie resurrected Kolchak with the fourth installment "The Vampire". The return of Kolchak proved a smash success. CBS pulled the series during midsummer and saved it for the fall premiere where it was expected to bring in more viewers. Universal held back four episodes to make two television movies. So successful was Kolchak on CBS late night, it was brought back two more times in 1981 and 1987-1988. After 1990, Universal pulled the two episodic "TV movies" and finally released the missing four episodes that CBS was not allowed to air. All 20 episodes of Kolchak were seen for the first time since 1975 in their original format on the Sci-Fi Channel in the early 1990s. They were released by Columbia House on home video and DVD in 2005.

== Plot ==
Carl Kolchak is an investigative reporter for the Chicago branch of the Independent News Service (INS), a small news agency. He often investigates bizarre or supernatural activities. Each episode is book-ended by Kolchak speaking into his portable cassette recorder or writing about what has transpired as his narration is heard during the episode.

== Characters ==
=== INS characters ===
- Carl Kolchak (portrayed by Darren McGavin) – Kolchak is a talented but outspoken investigative reporter with an affinity for bizarre and supernatural occurrences, obtaining information driving around Chicago in his yellow Ford Mustang convertible and snatching exclusives armed with his compact Rollei 16 camera and portable cassette recorder. He is perpetually dressed in a blue and white striped seesucker suit. Using only limited information, Kolchak has cracked several cases relying on gut instinct and often prevailing through sheer dumb luck. Often Kolchak's prospects are hampered by law enforcement personnel, other people getting in the way, and the destruction or confiscation of evidence which prove his claims which advance the sheer implausibility of his stories where his peers are concerned and causes his boss Tony Vincenzo to get frustrated. On other occasions, his investigations have led to demotion or relocation of varying authority figures who witnessed what happened, though reasons for these actions are never fully disclosed.
- Tony Vincenzo (portrayed by Simon Oakland) – Kolchak's bellicose and frustrated editor-in-chief and one of the only people willing to tolerate Kolchak's antics, despite their frequent arguments. Vincenzo has a grudging respect for Kolchak's reporting skills, but often finds himself caught between Kolchak's zeal and his own management responsibilities. Vincenzo's hot temper often affects his blood pressure and digestion and he sometimes laments that he did not go into his family's Venetian blinds business.
- Ron Updyke (portrayed by Jack Grinnage) – A reporter and Kolchak's supercilious rival at INS whom Kolchak repeatedly refers to as "Uptight". A San Francisco native, Updyke is the opposite of Kolchak, always smartly dressed and hobnobbing with Chicago's elite. He appeared in 18 episodes.
- Emily Cowles (portrayed by Ruth McDevitt) – An elderly puzzles and advice columnist known as "Miss Emily". Cowles aspires to be a novelist and expresses passion for issues relating to the elderly. She is often sympathetic toward Kolchak and the two share a warm working relationship. She appeared in 12 episodes.
- Monique Marmelstein (portrayed by Carol Ann Susi) – A graduate of the Columbia School of Journalism and an intern whose Uncle Abe is highly placed in INS management. Despite her education and enthusiasm, many of her coworkers believe she got her job due to nepotism, an allegation she denies. She appeared in three episodes.

=== Other recurring characters ===
- Gordon "Gordy The Ghoul" Spangler (portrayed by John Fiedler) – A city morgue attendant and sometimes source of information for Kolchak. Gordy runs a lottery pool based on death statistics and other factors. He appears in three episodes.
- Captain "Mad Dog" Siska (portrayed by Keenan Wynn) – A Chicago police captain whose efforts to rein in his volatile temper were constantly thwarted by Kolchak's abrasiveness. He appeared in two episodes.

== Music ==
Robert Cobert scored the music for the original television movies. Gil Mellé wrote the music for the TV series, including the theme that begins with Kolchak whistling in the opening credits. Mellé was offered the assignment with only 20 minutes before the opening credits were to be shot. With no time to compose a new theme, Mellé remembered a secondary theme that he had previously written for The Questor Tapes, an unsold pilot. As that had also been produced under Universal Television, the company already had the rights to the work and Mellé quickly adapted it for The Night Stalker.

Mellé left the series after the fourth episode, saying it was becoming too light-hearted. Composer Jerry Fielding took over scoring music for the remaining series, augmented by one score each from Greig McRitchie (best known for his collaborations with Fielding, and James Horner), and Luchi De Jesus. Music supervisor Hal Mooney reused much of Mellé's score in various later episodes (most notably "The Spanish Moss Murders", which has no credited score composer) along with material from the other composers.

Two soundtrack albums have been produced. One released in 2000 by Varèse Sarabande features two suites of Cobert's music from the TV movies. The other, a bootleg copy of Melle's private tapes, features his theme and scores written for the first three episodes ("The Ripper", "They Have Been, They Are, They Will Be..." and "The Vampire"), and two cues from the TV movie The Questor Tapes.

The Mellé theme also appears on the TVT Records' Television's Greatest Hits Volume 5. However, all licensed soundtrack recordings of the theme use an otherwise rare original recording alternate take of the theme. Initially identifiable by the altered opening whistle, an off-key electronic note is seemingly randomly introduced towards the end, but when synchronized with the picture it corresponds to a specific visual. Mellé was known for his innovative use of electronic orchestration (which was used throughout the series); however, the producers chose not to include this stylistic element in his main title for broadcast, instead opting for a more conventional all-orchestral sound.

== Episodes ==
No.	Title	Directed by	Written by	Original release date
1	"The Ripper"	Allen Baron	Rudolph Borchert	September 13, 1974
Kolchak argues that a modern serial killer is actually Jack the Ripper. Guest stars: Beatrice Colen, Ken Lynch, Roberta Collins, Marya Small: Note: Included with "The Vampire" in The Night Stalker: Two Tales of Terror video compilation.
2	"The Zombie"	Alex Grasshoff	T : David Chase; S/T : Zekial Marko	September 20, 1974
Marie Juliette Edmonds, a woman whose grandson François was murdered by mobsters, uses voodoo to turn him into a zombie and take revenge. Guest stars: Charles Aidman, Joseph Sirola, Val Bisoglio, J. Pat O'Malley, John Fiedler, Antonio Fargas, Scatman Crothers, Cosmo Sardo: Note: Originally listed in TV Guide as the show's debut episode.
3	"They Have Been, They Are, They Will Be..."	Allen Baron	S : Dennis Clark; T : Rudolph Borchert	September 27, 1974
Also known as "U.F.O." An invisible alien sucks out the bone marrow of its victims while it makes repairs on its spaceship and looks for directions home. Sportscaster Dick Enberg can be heard on Kolchak's car radio calling game 1 of a fictional World Series between the Chicago Cubs and Boston Red Sox.
4	"The Vampire"	Don Weis	S : Bill Stratton; T : David Chase	October 4, 1974
In a sequel to the first movie The Night Stalker, an overlooked victim of the vampire Janos Skorzeny from Las Vegas named Catherine Rawlins makes her way to Los Angeles and begins killing anew. Guest stars: William Daniels, Suzanne Charny, John Doucette, Larry Storch, Kathleen Nolan, Jan Murray: Note: Typically shown as the first episode of the 16 originally available for syndication and included with "The Ripper" in The Night Stalker: Two Tales of Terror video compilation.
5	"The Werewolf"	Allen Baron	David Chase and Paul Playdon	November 1, 1974
In snowy Chicago, the INS crew hold a send-off for Tony Vincenzo who is heading on a singles cruise, but he gets audited instead. Kolchak wheedles his way into taking his place on the cruise and ends up battling a werewolf on a killing spree. Guest stars: Eric Braeden, Dick Gautier, Henry Jones, Nita Talbot, Bob Hastings
6	"Firefall"	Don Weis	Bill S. Ballinger	November 8, 1974
The ghost of arsonist Frankie Markoff tries to take over renowned conductor Ryder Bond's body as his doppelgänger and kills a number of Bond's associates by spontaneous human combustion. Guest stars: Fred Beir, Philip Carey, Virginia Vincent, Alice Backes, David Doyle, George Sawaya: Note: This episode was combined with "The Energy Eater" and new narration by Darren McGavin to compose the television film Crackle of Death, effectively removing it from the original syndication. One of the locations used, St. Joseph Catholic Church in Los Angeles, burned down in 1983.
7	"The Devil's Platform"	Allen Baron	S : Tim Maschler; T : Donn Mullally	November 15, 1974
Robert Palmer (Tom Skerritt), a politician on a meteoric rise, murders his opposition through a pact with Satan which gives him the ability to turn into an invulnerable dog. Guest stars: Tom Skerritt, Julie Gregg, Ellen Weston
8	"Bad Medicine"	Alex Grasshoff	L. Ford Neale & John Huff	November 29, 1974
The first episode based on an American Native legend, a shaman spirit called the Diablero (Richard Kiel) murders for jewels to pay back his debt and be released from his Earthly bonds. Guest stars: Richard Kiel, Ramon Bieri, Victor Jory, Alice Ghostley
9	"The Spanish Moss Murders"	Gordon Hessler	T : David Chase; S/T : Al Friedman	December 6, 1974
A participant in a sleep study project dreams up the Louisiana Creole legend of Père Malfait (French for "father [of] mischief/wrongdoing/sin") (Richard Kiel), who begins preying on the impure. Guest stars: Richard Kiel, Severn Darden, Keenan Wynn
10	"The Energy Eater"	Alex Grasshoff	T : Rudolph Bochert; S/T : Arthur Rowe	December 13, 1974
A hospital is built on reclaimed land inhabited by the American Native bear god, Matchemonedo, which feeds on all forms of energy. Guest stars: William Smith, Tom Drake, Elaine Giftos, Michael Strong, John Alvin, Michael Fox, Robert Cornthwaite: Note: This episode was combined with "Firefall" and new narration by Darren McGavin to compose the television film Crackle of Death, effectively removing it from the original syndication.
11	"Horror in the Heights"	Michael T. Caffey	Jimmy Sangster	December 20, 1974
A flesh-eating Hindu demon called a Rakshasa, which can assume the form of someone its victim trusts, terrorizes a Jewish neighborhood. Guest stars: Phil Silvers, Murray Matheson, Abraham Sofaer, Benny Rubin, Shelly Novack, Barry Gordon
12	"Mr. R.I.N.G."	Gene Levitt	L. Ford Neale & John Huff	January 10, 1975
An escaped android named Mr. R.I.N.G. (Craig R. Baxley) murders anyone that threatens its survival. Guest stars: Julie Adams, Corinne Camacho, Bert Freed, Henry Beckman, Don "Red" Barry
13	"Primal Scream"	Robert Scheerer	Bill S. Ballinger and David Chase	January 17, 1975
A freezer malfunction thaws ancient cell samples from the Arctic which grow into a savage prehistoric ape-man (Gary Baxley). A police manhunt ensues when the creature goes on a murderous rampage. Kolchak consults a science teacher who notes that the creature does not resemble any known human ancestors. Guest stars: John Marley, Jamie Farr, Katherine Woodville, Pat Harrington Jr., Barbara Rhoades
14	"The Trevi Collection"	Don Weis	Rudolph Borchert	January 24, 1975
Kolchak’s routine coverage of a fashion line debut becomes a hunt for a powerful and vengeful witch attempting to control the fashion industry. Guest stars: Lara Parker, Nina Foch, Marvin Miller, Bernie Kopell
15	"Chopper"	Bruce Kessler	S : Robert Zemeckis & Bob Gale; T : Steve Fisher and David Chase	January 31, 1975
Harold "Swordsman" Baker, a headless motorcycle rider, murders those responsible for his death. Guest stars: Larry Linville, Art Metrano, Jim Backus, Frank Aletter, Sharon Farrell, Jay Robinson, Steve Franken
16	"Demon in Lace"	Don Weis	T : Michael Kozoll and David Chase; S/T : Stephen Lord	February 7, 1975
An ancient Mesopotamian clay tablet houses a succubus. The succubus possesses the corpses of recently deceased young women to feed on young men. Guest stars: Andrew Prine, Jackie Vernon, Margie Impert: Note: This episode was combined with "Legacy of Terror" and new narration by Darren McGavin to compose the television film The Demon and The Mummy, effectively removing it from the original syndication.
17	"Legacy of Terror"	Don McDougall	Arthur Rowe	February 14, 1975
An ancient Aztec cult seeks to sustain their mummified leader by sacrificing five perfect warriors. Guest stars: Ramon Bieri, Pippa Scott, Victor Campos, Sorrell Booke, Erik Estrada: Note: This episode was combined with "Demon In Lace" and new narration by Darren McGavin to compose the television film The Demon and The Mummy, but it is still in syndication airing on MeTV in New Jersey.
18	"The Knightly Murders"	Vincent McEveety	S : Paul Magistretti; T : Michael Kozoll and David Chase	March 7, 1975
To prevent the destruction of its home, transplanted from Europe to a struggling Chicago museum, the spirit of a medieval knight animates his suit of armor. Guest stars: John Dehner, Hans Conried, Robert Emhardt, Jeff Donnell, Sidney Clute, Shug Fisher, Lieux Dressler, Gregg Palmer, Bryan O'Byrne
19	"The Youth Killer"	Don McDougall	Rudolph Borchert	March 14, 1975
Helen of Troy (Cathy Lee Crosby) operates an elite dating service to identify sacrificial victims for the goddess Hecate, in exchange for eternal youth and beauty. Guest stars: Cathy Lee Crosby, Dwayne Hickman, John Fiedler, Kathleen Freeman
20	"The Sentry"	Seymour Robbie	L. Ford Neale & John Huff	March 28, 1975
A reptilian humanoid kills excavation workers who have stolen her eggs. Guest stars: Kathie Browne, Albert Paulsen, John Hoyt, Frank Marth Special guest star: Tom Bosley

=== Unproduced scripts ===
The series was cancelled with only 20 episodes completed. The initial order of 26 episodes meant there were scripts that were completed but unproduced. Three additional scripts commissioned before the series was cancelled still survive.

==== "Eve of Terror", by Stephen Lord ====
After a researcher is exposed to sonic stimulation in her laboratory, she becomes deranged and gains superhuman strength in a Jekyll and Hyde-type story, murdering people who do not conform with her ideas of feminism.

==== "The Get of Belial" by Donn Mullally ====
Kolchak is assigned to cover a miners' strike in the mountains of West Virginia. He uncovers gruesome murders associated with a backwoods family and Kolchak suspects that they have some sort of inbred monster living with them.

==== "The Executioners" by Max Hodge ====
Kolchak is demoted and is given the choice of writing obituaries or writing articles for the arts section. He chooses the latter and discovers a painting tied into a series of murders that Vincenzo is covering. These murders occur in a sequence of three, in which the first victim is hanged, the second executed with an ax, and the third poisoned. Working with an art expert, Kolchak attempts to unravel who or what is behind these bizarre murders and what they have to do with the painting, all without alerting Vincenzo that he is working on the same story.

== Legacy ==
Though Kolchak was short-lived as a series, its impact on popular culture has been substantial. In particular the series has been described as a predecessor to The X-Files (1993–2002, 2016, 2018). The X-Files's creator, Chris Carter, has acknowledged that the show had influenced him greatly in his own work. In one interview when told that the majority of the viewing public considered the success of The X-Files series as being inspired by shows such as The Twilight Zone or The Outer Limits, Carter said that while those shows were indeed an influence on The X-Files, it was only about 10 percent, with another 30 percent coming from the Kolchak series and the rest derived as being based upon original 'pure inspiration'. Carter paid tribute to Kolchak in a number of ways in the show. Several episodes featured a character named for Richard Matheson (Raymond J. Barry), screenwriter of the two pilot films. Carter wanted McGavin to appear as Kolchak in The X-Files, but McGavin was unwilling to reprise the character for the show. He then pitched the idea of him portraying Fox Mulder (David Duchovny)'s father Bill which he also turned down. He did eventually appear in several episodes as Arthur Dales, a retired FBI agent described as the "father of the X-Files". In the third episode of the 2016 revival series, Guy Mann (Rhys Darby), a character prominently featured in the episode "Mulder and Scully Meet the Were-Monster" is conspicuously attired in Kolchak's signature seersucker jacket, black knit tie, and straw hat.

The first work to openly be inspired by Kolchak: The Night Stalker appeared less than a year after its original broadcast. The comic book The Tomb of Dracula #43 (cover dated April 1976) stars a character named Paul Butterworth, an investigative reporter with an obvious resemblance to Kolchak in both appearance and personality. Like Kolchak, he clashes with his editor, Paul Lamenzo, and is ultimately unable to get his story about a supernatural menace published. The inspiration is acknowledged by the story's title, "Paul Butterworth: The Night-Stalker".

Jim Knipfel in "The Omen: The Pedigree of a Horror Classic" on Den of Geek, noted a number of similarities between the 1976 film franchise The Omen and the Kolchak: The Night Stalker episode "The Devil's Platform", concluding that, "In a way, watching 'The Devil’s Platform' is a bit like watching all three Omen films from an outsider journalist’s perspective, except Kolchak is able to wrap the whole thing up neatly in an hour."

The 1995 comic book Primortals #10 depicts a reporter named Carl calling his boss Vincenzo as he investigates the landing site of an alien spaceship. The issue's writer, Christopher Mills, later went on to write Kolchak comic books.

Gary Gygax cited an episode of the series ("Horror in the Heights") as part of the inspiration behind the Rakshasa in the Dungeons & Dragons game.

=== 2005 television series ===
Although Rice retains the rights to written Kolchak works, and Universal Studios owns the rights to the TV series, ABC maintained dramatic rights to the character and ownership of the two TV movies. The network began airing a new Night Stalker series on September 29, 2005, with the character Carl Kolchak portrayed by Stuart Townsend. On November 14, 2005, ABC and creator Frank Spotnitz announced that the new series was being cancelled due to low ratings. The complete 2005 series was released on DVD.

In a nod to the original series, the pilot episode has a brief shot of Darren McGavin lifted from the first TV movie, as the new Kolchak is walking through the Los Angeles Beacon newsroom. In another shot, when fellow reporter Perri Reed (Gabrielle Union) is searching through Kolchak's room, the hat McGavin wore in the original series is seen hanging on a coat rack. Other character names from the TV movies are referenced in various episodes, and one episode ("Timeless") recycled much of the plot of the TV movie The Night Strangler. In the 1970s, the Kolchak character was often seen in his yellow 1966 Ford Mustang convertible, while the new series' Kolchak drives an orange Mustang from 2005. The Beacon's owner, the Crossbinder Corporation, was named after Llewllyn Crossbinder, the publisher in The Night Strangler.

=== Other projects ===
In 1991, author Mark Dawidziak wrote Night Stalking: A 20th Anniversary Kolchak Companion detailing the production of the movies and TV series, and in the process struck up a friendship with Kolchak's creator Jeff Rice. When a publisher asked Rice to write a third novel in the Kolchak series, Rice said he was not interested, but recommended Dawidziak for the project. Thus, in 1994, Dawidziak produced the first official Kolchak material since the end of the TV series. The novel, Grave Secrets, moved Kolchak from Chicago to Los Angeles where he obtained a job at the Hollywood Dispatch newspaper (nicknamed the "Disgrace"). Most of the recurring characters from the TV movies and series also appear. Kolchak investigates a ghost who is killing those responsible for the destruction of the cemetery where its body is buried. An expanded and updated version of Dawidziak's Night Stalking was published in 1997 by Pomegranate Press as The Night Stalker Companion: A 30th Anniversary Tribute. In 2003, the scripts for The Night Stalker, The Night Strangler and the unfilmed The Night Killers were published by Gauntlet Press as Richard Matheson's Kolchak Scripts (edited with introductions by Dawidziak).

A comic book adaptation of the first film was published in 2002 by Moonstone Books, with some commercial success. Moonstone continues to publish both a bimonthly serial magazine and a series of prose novels and graphic novels featuring the characters. Moonstone also adapted Rice's original The Night Stalker script as well as two unfilmed scripts for the TV series: "The Get of Belial" and "Eve of Terror".

In 2006, Moonstone published a short fiction anthology, The Night Stalker Chronicles, with short stories contributed by writers such as Peter David, Mike W. Barr, Stuart M. Kaminsky, Richard Dean Starr, C. J. Henderson, Dawidziak and Max Allan Collins. A second volume, Kolchak: The Night Stalker Casebook, was published in January 2007 featuring new short fiction by authors including P. N. Elrod, Christopher Golden, Richard Dean Starr, Dawidziak and Elaine Bergstrom. Between 2007 and 2012, Moonstone published several Night Stalker novels and novellas, including The Lovecraftian Horror, The Lovecraftian Damnation, The Lovecraftian Gambit, A Black and Evil Truth and The Lost World, all by C. J. Henderson. A Black and Evil Truth was later released as an audiobook. In 2017, Moonstone published Kolchak: Double Feature: Nightkillers, which included a prose adaptation of Richard Matheson's unproduced script for the third tv film, now adapted by Chuck Miller for the prose format.

In 2022, Moonstone published a graphic novel called Kolchak: The Night Stalker - 50th Anniversary, which was edited by James Aquilone and won the Bram Stoker Award for Best Graphic Novel. The book included stories by such writers as Rodney Barnes, Kim Newman, Nancy A. Collins, Jonathan Maberry, Steve Niles, Gabriel Hardman, and Peter David. Artists included J.K. Woodward, Marco Finnegan, Colton Worley, Paul McCaffrey and Julius Ohta.

=== Home media ===
Magnetic Video released the first TV movie on VHS, The Night Stalker, and years after the label was taken over by 20th Century Fox, it was kept in print as part of its "Selections" series until their licensing deal with ABC expired. MGM Home Video released the two TV movies on DVD on August 24, 2004. Universal Studios released Kolchak: The Night Stalker – The Complete Series on DVD a year later. Madman Entertainment released the complete series on DVD in Australia and New Zealand on July 15, 2009.

Besides Amazon carrying the DVD set for sale on its website, Netflix offered it for rental. During the early 2010s, Netflix had it available to stream for a time, then took it off again. Kolchak: The Night Stalker returned in August 2016, just as Universal was about to release it again on DVD. Although the series was not added as part of NBC's new Peacock streaming site in 2020, it was available on the free ad-supported NBC.com. In September, it was added to the MeTV lineup at 11 p.m. central on Saturdays, along with lots of trivia on its website.

The two TV films, The Night Stalker and The Night Strangler, were each released on Blu-ray October 2, 2018, and DVD by Kino Lorber. Kolchak: The Night Stalker (1974–75) Complete Series Blu-ray (also by Kino Lorber) was released on October 12, 2021. The Blu-ray features 21 commentary tracks by film/tv historians as well as a new interview with writer David Chase. In addition to recording a commentary for the premiere episode "The Ripper", Mark Dawidziak, author of The Night Stalker Companion and Kolchak novel, Grave Secrets, also provided a Booklet Essay.

DVD name	Ep #	Release dates			
DVD name	Ep #	Region 1	Region 2	Region 4	Region A
Kolchak: The Night Stalker – The Complete Series	20	October 4, 2005	August 21, 2006	July 15, 2009	October 12, 2021 (Blu-ray)
