= The Saga of Seven Suns =

Series of novels

- 1st edition, Hidden Empire (2002)
- Hidden Empire (2002); A Forest of Stars (2003); Horizon Storms (2004); Scattered Suns (2005); Of Fire and Night (2006); Metal Swarm (2007); The Ashes of Worlds (2008)
- Author: Kevin J. Anderson
- Country: United States
- Language: English
- Genre: Science fiction, Space opera
- Publisher: Aspect/Orbit Books (US)
- Published: July 2002 – July 2008
- Media type: Print (hardback & paperback)
- No. of books: 7
- Preceded by: Veiled Alliances (prequel)
- Followed by: The Saga of Shadows

The Saga of Seven Suns is a series of seven space opera novels by American writer Kevin J. Anderson, published between 2002 and 2008. The books are set in a not-too-distant future where humans have colonized a number of other planets across the galaxy, thanks in part to technological assistance from an ancient alien race, the Ildirans. The series chronicles the universe-spanning war that erupts when humans inadvertently ignite the fury of a hidden empire of elemental aliens known as the hydrogues. Internal conflict is sparked within both the human and Ildiran empires as other ancient elemental races reappear to renew their own ancient war with the hydrogues.

A sequel trilogy, The Saga of Shadows, includes the novels The Dark Between the Stars (2014), Blood of the Cosmos (2015) and Eternity's Mind (2016).

== Setting ==
In the future, the human race has colonized multiple planets in the Spiral Arm, most of which are governed by the powerful Terran Hanseatic League (Hansa). Though ostensibly ruled by kings, the Hansa is actually controlled by its chairman, and the puppet monarchs merely follow orders. Centuries before, several generation ships had set out from Earth to find new worlds; one of these had encountered the Ildirans, an ancient alien race who shared their stardrive technology (which allows faster-than-light travel) and led the humans to habitable planets. The Ildirans themselves, psychically linked to their leader the Mage-Imperator, have become stagnant and eschew both expansion and innovation.

As the series begins, the arrogant Hansa Chairman Basil Wenceslas begins grooming a replacement for the aging King Frederick. Basil looks to expand the human empire further through the discovery of alien technology from the extinct Klikiss race that will allow scientists to create a new star from a gas giant, turning cold moons into planets ripe for colonization. The most prominent human world aside from Earth is Theroc, a planet covered in semi-sentient worldtrees that is quietly independent from the Hansa. Theroc's "green priests" are able to commune with the trees and communicate telepathically across space when touching a treeling, making them indispensable for instantaneous communication across the galaxy. The Roamers are clans of industrious humans living a clandestine existence in the fringes of space, managing a profitable economy centered on the sale of the valuable stardrive fuel ekti and other commodities. The ignition of the gas giant Oncier reveals the existence of the elemental hydrogues, and the inadvertent hydrogue genocide at the hands of the humans incites the ire of the other hidden hydrogue populations across the galaxy. Their brutal retaliation and forced cessation of ekti collection threaten to cripple both the human and Ildiran civilizations, and serve as an effective declaration of war. The aggression of the hydrogues reawakens the verdani, the worldtree entities who had fled to Theroc after losing an ancient war with the hydrogues. Meanwhile, the Ildiran Mage-Imperator Cyroc'h struggles to hide his race's secrets and keep the centuries-old plan for ultimate Ildiran survival on track. And the amnesiac black Klikiss robots, left behind after their parent race's mysterious destruction, have secrets of their own.

The war escalates simmering rivalries among the human factions and ignites a schism in the Ildiran consciousness. Later, the fire-based faeros and aquatic wentals also reappear as the war with their ancient hydrogue enemies escalates. The long-held secrets of the Ildirans and the Klikiss robots are revealed amidst much destruction, and after 10,000 years the Klikiss return to reclaim their own empire at any cost.

== Book 1: Hidden Empire (2002) ==
Hidden Empire
- Author: Kevin J. Anderson
- Audio read by: George Guidall
- Series: The Saga of Seven Suns
- Genre: Space opera, Science fiction
- Published: 2002 (Aspect)
- Media type: Print
- Pages: 464
- ISBN: 0446528625
- Followed by: A Forest of Stars

Hidden Empire is the first book in The Saga of Seven Suns series by Kevin J. Anderson, published on July 24, 2002. Publishers Weekly called it a "stellar launch of a new series" and a "fascinating future epic", and praised its "engaging characters." Harriet Klausner of TheBestReviews.com wrote, "The tale grabs the audience from the start as Kevin J. Anderson ... blends the players and worlds into the thrilling plot. Thus, the audience does not receive an extended prologue as often seen in first novels. Instead readers obtain a powerful futuristic epic that contains a robust stand-alone story line yet provides a puissant cliffhanger that will keep the audience wanting to continue non-stop." However SF Signal described it as "A rather pedestrian space opera that nonetheless has some cool ideas."

=== Plot ===
Having colonized many worlds in the Spiral Arm, humanity is divided into three branches: the Earth-based Terran Hanseatic League (Hansa) and its subordinate planets, the independent world Theroc with its telepathic green priests, and the Roamers, interplanetary traders who prefer starships and hidden bases to a conventional planet-based civilization. The only other known intelligent species in the galaxy are the Ildirans, an ancient civilization at its peak, and the long-extinct Klikiss, whose planets remain empty but for their unusual ruins.

As the novel begins, the Hansa's test of a recently discovered ancient Klikiss technology that can convert gas giant planets into suns is a success. The ignition of the planet Oncier will eventually make its satellite moons into habitable worlds perfect for human colonization, but it has also murdered millions of hydrogues, a previously unknown race of gas elementals living in the high-pressure core of the planet. Confined in crystalline globe ships, the hydrogues retaliate by systematically destroying several Roamer skymines, floating factories which harvest the hydrogen used to produce the vital stardrive fuel ekti from the atmosphere of gas giants. The powerful warglobes also destroy the moons of Oncier and the scientific space station there before warning the human race to stay away from all gas giants or be destroyed. This ultimatum is punctuated by the murder of the Hansa's puppet king Frederick and everyone in his vicinity.

As a lack of ekti will cripple both the human and Ildirian civilizations, and the hydrogues refuse to negotiate or even respond to human overtures of peace, their ultimatum is effectively a declaration of war. The humans and Ildirans mount a defense to protect their interests, but the virtually indestructible hydrogue ships and their lightning and ice weapons seem an unconquerable enemy. Arrogant Hansa Chairman Basil Wenceslas, the real power behind the Hansa, installs the young Prince Peter as Frederick's successor. Hand-picked by Basil from obscurity and specially trained for his role as Hansa figurehead, the new King Peter is soon at odds with the chairman, whose governing style seems more to Peter like a self-serving consolidation of power than a means to lead the human population in a meaningful way. Meanwhile, the sudden appearance of the hydrogues complicates matters for Ildiran Mage-Imperator Cyroc'h; he and his predecessors have kept the existence of the hydrogues a secret for millennia as they plotted a means to neutralize the threat should the hydrogues return. Cyroc'h's own heir, Prime Designate Jora'h, has fallen in love with the human green priest Nira Khali, and Cyroc'h soon comes to believe that her telepathic abilities could be of use to his failing hydrogue plan.

== Book 2: A Forest of Stars (2003) ==
A Forest of Stars
- Author: Kevin J. Anderson
- Audio read by: George Guidall
- Series: The Saga of Seven Suns
- Genre: Space opera, Science fiction
- Published: 2003 (Aspect)
- Media type: Print
- Pages: 496
- ISBN: 0446528714
- Preceded by: Hidden Empire
- Followed by: Horizon Storms

A Forest of Stars is the second book in The Saga of Seven Suns series by Kevin J. Anderson, published on July 17, 2003. Calling Anderson's characters "well-drawn," Publishers Weekly wrote that the author "weaves action, romance and science with a rousing plot reflecting the classic SF of Clarke and Herbert and the glossy cinematic influence of Lucas and Spielberg."

=== Plot ===
Five years after the war began, the hydrogues maintain absolute control over the galaxy's gas giant planets. On Earth the government is tightening its grip on rebellious colonies while seeking to dominate the other humans throughout the galaxy, unaware that the seemingly-benign Klikiss robots, left behind when the Klikiss died out, are actually planning the destruction of the human race as they did their parent Klikiss. The Roamer skymines have been abandoned or destroyed, but innovative clans have come up with smash-and-grab tactics to acquire what ekti they can. The worldtrees of Theroc have been revealed as the verdani, ancient rivals of the hydrogues. Though a heartbroken Jora'h believes she is dead, Nira is secretly a captive being used in the clandestine breeding scheme of Mage-Imperator Cyroc'h to create an Ildiran capable of communicating with the hydrogues. So far the best candidate appears to be Osira'h, the secret daughter of Nira and Jora'h. The Hansa begins building military robots (Soldier compies) to fight the war using technology copied from Klikiss robots. Two new races of elemental entities are rediscovered—the fire-based faeros and aquatic wentals—who join in the war against their ancient enemies, the hydrogues.

== Book 3: Horizon Storms (2004) ==
Horizon Storms
- Author: Kevin J. Anderson
- Audio read by: George Guidall
- Series: The Saga of Seven Suns
- Genre: Space opera, Science fiction
- Published: 2004 (Aspect)
- Media type: Print
- Pages: 496
- ISBN: 0446528722
- Preceded by: A Forest of Stars
- Followed by: Scattered Suns

Horizon Storms is the third book in The Saga of Seven Suns series by Kevin J. Anderson, published on July 29, 2004. Publishers Weekly wrote that the novel was "Crackling with energy and buzzing with action," calling it "thrilling" and a "hot summer read."

=== Plot ===
The elemental war between hydrogues and faeros continues to sweep across the Spiral Arm, extinguishing suns and destroying planets. Hansa Chairman Basil Wenceslas (and his figurehead King Peter) attempts to unify all branches of the human race to stand together against the threat, even if they must resort to deception and oppression to do so. The Roamer clans and the people of Theroc do not give up their independence easily, however, and Basil's policies soon force the disparate civilizations to forge alliances of their own. Partly as a distraction from their peril and partly as a desperate hope, the Hansa launches an ambitious new colonization program using the network of recently discovered Klikiss transportals, instantaneous gateways that take colonists to many abandoned Klikiss worlds. On the planet Ildira, newly crowned Mage-Imperator Jora'h faces the responsibilities and secrets his predecessors have imposed upon him: a breeding program forced upon a colony of human captives and an uneasy pact with the Klikiss robots that could result in the extinction of the human race. But Jora'h must also survive an open rebellion among the Ildirans unleashed by his own brother Rusa'h, the first in 10,000 years.

== Book 4: Scattered Suns (2005) ==
Scattered Suns
- Author: Kevin J. Anderson
- Audio read by: David Colacci
- Series: The Saga of Seven Suns
- Genre: Space opera, Science fiction
- Published: 2005 (Aspect)
- Media type: Print
- Pages: 496
- ISBN: 0446577170
- Preceded by: Horizon Storms
- Followed by: Of Fire and Night

Scattered Suns is the fourth book in The Saga of Seven Suns series by Kevin J. Anderson, published on July 18, 2005. Publishers Weekly wrote that "Anderson delivers more on-the-edge-of-your-seat SF thrills" and that he "handles a huge cast and complicated plot with élan."

=== Plot ===
Ildiran Mage-Imperator Jora'h is preoccupied with the bloody rebellion that his brother Rusa'h has launched across the Ildiran planets, with the help of Jora'h's own first-born son Thor'h. But as the war between the hydrogues and faeros continues, the hydrogues offer the Ildirans peace if they help destroy the humans. On Earth, Hansa Chairman Basil Wenceslas continues his red-herring war against the Roamer clans. With some of their hidden bases found and destroyed, the wandering Roamers scatter into hiding, trying to keep their culture and government intact, even when faced with enemies from all sides. Speaker Cesca Peroni, leader of the Roamers, finds herself stranded on a small icy outpost where miners have uncovered a hibernating army of Klikiss robots. It soon becomes clear to Cesca that the black robots are anything but benign.

== Book 5: Of Fire and Night (2006) ==
Of Fire and Night
- Author: Kevin J. Anderson
- Audio read by: David Colacci
- Series: The Saga of Seven Suns
- Genre: Space opera, Science fiction
- Published: 2006 (Aspect)
- Media type: Print
- Pages: 544
- ISBN: 0446577189
- Preceded by: Scattered Suns
- Followed by: Metal Swarm

Of Fire and Night is the fifth book in The Saga of Seven Suns series by Kevin J. Anderson, published on July 13, 2006. Publishers Weekly wrote that the "fabulous fifth volume ... combines glitzy space-opera flash with witty, character-driven action on a cosmic scale," and again complimented Anderson's ability to manage multiple plotlines and a large cast of characters.

=== Plot ===
With the fate of the Hansa seeming darker than ever, the increasingly desperate and irrational Chairman Basil Wenceslas's punitive treatment of Hansa colonies and free-spirited Roamers, as well as his refusal to aid the burned forest world of Theroc, has made enemies all around. Earth's own Soldier compies have rebelled thanks to secret programming by the Klikiss robots, taking over most of the Earth Defense Force battleships across the Spiral Arm. Pushed into a corner, Ildiran Mage-Imperator Jora'h has reluctantly agreed to assist the hydrogues in exterminating the human race so that the Ildirans will be spared. Ancient verdani thorny tree battleships arrive after a long journey across the universe to aid Theroc, while the Roamers' plan to seed aquatic planets with wentals to rejuvenate the elemental race comes to fruition. The final hydrogue assault on Earth is put in motion, and with the Hansa's loss of military might and allies, the outlook is grim.

== Book 6: Metal Swarm (2007) ==
Metal Swarm
- Author: Kevin J. Anderson
- Audio read by: David Colacci
- Series: The Saga of Seven Suns
- Genre: Space opera, Science fiction
- Published: 2007 (Orbit Books)
- Media type: Print
- Pages: 480
- ISBN: 0316021741
- Preceded by: Of Fire and Night
- Followed by: The Ashes of Worlds

Metal Swarm is the sixth book in The Saga of Seven Suns series by Kevin J. Anderson, published on December 10, 2007. Publishers Weekly noted that while the series "has been compared to some of the genre's grandest epics with good reason," Metal Swarm itself "fails to satisfy on its own merits" and "much of the action-packed conflict remains relatively predictable." The review placed blame on the novel's "unwieldy cast of characters, tapestry of intertwining subplots and eon-spanning backstory." Paul Di Filippo of SciFi.com agreed that Metal Swarm is "just more of what has come before" and suggested that the story arc did not really justify such a long series. He commented that by the sixth installment "one would hope for a kind of summing-up or accelerando or intensification of pitch" but felt that "the initial states of the protagonists remain essentially static."

=== Plot ===
The hydrogues have been defeated across the galaxy thanks to the combined efforts of the Earth Defense Forces, the Ildiran Empire, the Roamer clans, the wentals and the verdani. But as the various factions try to recover, Hansa Chairman Basil Wenceslas intends to brutally crush any resistance to his rule. King Peter and Queen Estarra, having escaped Earth and Basil's plot to kill them and their unborn child, have fled to Theroc and declared a new Confederation. Peter embraces the Roamer clans, denouncing Basil and assuring that the essential Theron green priests across the galaxy will not aid the Hansa until Basil abdicates. An ever-growing number of colony worlds, already devoted to Peter and tired of their treatment by the Hansa, also declare their independence from Basil's government and ally themselves with Peter. Despite several losses in their bid to seize control of the galaxy, the Klikiss robots continue to attack helpless worlds with stolen Earth battleships. They are stunned to come face to face with their ancient enemies the Klikiss, who have returned after 10,000 years intent on reclaiming their former worlds and willing to annihilate anyone who happens to be in the way. Jora'h's brother Rusa'h, thought killed when his rebellion was crushed, returns as an avatar of the faeros, devouring the souls of planet after planet of Ildirans to rejuvenate the weakened fire elementals and destroy Jora'h.

== Book 7: The Ashes of Worlds (2008) ==
The Ashes of Worlds
- Author: Kevin J. Anderson
- Audio read by: David Colacci
- Series: The Saga of Seven Suns
- Genre: Space opera, Science fiction
- Published: 2008 (Orbit Books)
- Media type: Print
- Pages: 512
- ISBN: 0316007579
- Preceded by: Metal Swarm

The Ashes of Worlds is the seventh book in The Saga of Seven Suns series by Kevin J. Anderson, published on July 1, 2008.

=== Plot ===
At the end of his rope, Hansa Chairman Basil Wenceslas has alienated all of the other factions in the Spiral Arm in his increasingly myopic and destructive struggle to reconsolidate the power he once held over the human race. With the Ildiran Mage-Imperator his hostage to thwart an Ildiran alliance with King Peter's Confederation, Basil installs a new puppet king of the Hansa: Peter's own brother Rory, thought killed years before. Rusa'h and the faeros have seized control of Ildira and Theroc with much loss of Ildiran and human lives.

== Prequel: Veiled Alliances (Graphic novel) (2004) ==
Veiled Alliances
- Author: Kevin J. Anderson
- Audio read by: David Colacci
- Illustrator: Robert Teranishi (inks); Wendy Fouts-Broome (colors)
- Series: The Saga of Seven Suns
- Genre: Space opera, Science fiction
- Published: 2004 (WildStorm)
- Media type: Print (Graphic novel)
- Pages: 96
- ISBN: 1563899019

Veiled Alliances is a prequel graphic novel to The Saga of Seven Suns series by Kevin J. Anderson, published on February 1, 2004. Publishers Weekly commended its "superlative art" but noted that the plot "feels more like the rushed synopsis of a story than the story itself."

=== Plot ===
A few hundred years before the events of Hidden Empire (2002), eleven generation ships had been dispatched from an overpopulated Earth to find new planets to colonize. One of the ships, the Caillié, ultimately stumbles upon the Ildirans, an advanced race capable of faster-than-light travel. The Ildirans help the inhabitants of the Caillié settle the planet Theroc and rescue most of the remaining human ships, then send an envoy to Earth seeking an alliance. Earth is now governed by the wizened King Ben, with Hansa Chairman Malcolm Stannis pulling the strings behind the scenes.

== Critical reception ==
The series has received varied reviews. Publishers Weekly called 2002's Hidden Empire a "stellar launch of a new series" and a "fascinating future epic", and praised its "engaging characters." Harriet Klausner of TheBestReviews.com wrote, "The tale grabs the audience from the start as Kevin J. Anderson ... blends the players and worlds into the thrilling plot. Thus, the audience does not receive an extended prologue as often seen in first novels. Instead readers obtain a powerful futuristic epic that contains a robust stand-alone story line yet provides a puissant cliffhanger that will keep the audience wanting to continue non-stop." However SF Signal described it as "A rather pedestrian space opera that nonetheless has some cool ideas." By the sixth book, Metal Swarm (2007), Publishers Weekly noted that while the series "has been compared to some of the genre's grandest epics with good reason," Metal Swarm itself "fails to satisfy on its own merits" and "much of the action-packed conflict remains relatively predictable." Paul Di Filippo of SciFi.com agreed that Metal Swarm is "just more of what has come before" and suggested that the story arc did not really justify such a long series.

== Sequel trilogy ==
Anderson announced a sequel trilogy called The Saga of Shadows on his blog in December 2011. The first novel, The Dark Between the Stars, was released by Tor Books on June 3, 2014. The second book in the series, Blood of the Cosmos, was published on June 2, 2015. The third novel, published September 13, 2016, is called Eternity's Mind.
