= Shawna McCarthy =

American magazine editor (born 1954)

- Born: 1954 (age 71–72)
- Citizenship: USA
- Education: Wilkes College
- Occupation: Editor
- Children: 1
- Writing career
- Language: English
- Genres: Science fiction, fantasy
- Notable awards: 1983 Hugo Award for Best Professional Editor

Shawna Lee McCarthy (born 1954) is an American science fiction and fantasy editor and literary agent.

McCarthy graduated from the Wilkes University and studied at the American University.

== Career ==
McCarthy edited various magazines for several years, starting as editorial assistant and editor of Firehouse Magazine before working as the managing editor at Asimov's. In 1983, she took over from Kathleen Moloney as the editor-in-chief of Isaac Asimov's Science Fiction Magazine, a change under which the magazine "acquired an edgier and more literary and experimental tone." During her time at Asimov's, McCarthy edited four anthologies of stories from the magazine (Isaac Asimov's Wonders of the World (1982), Isaac Asimov's Aliens & Outworlders (1983), Isaac Asimov's Space of Her Own (1984) and Isaac Asimov's Fantasy! (1985)), and received the 1984 Hugo Award for Best Professional Editor (she was nominated for this award three times). She left the magazine in 1985 and was succeeded by Gardner Dozois.

After leaving Asimov's, McCarthy became an editor for Bantam in 1985 and co-edited the first two volumes of that publisher's Full Spectrum anthology series with Lou Aronica, et al. Upon leaving Bantam in 1988, she began working as a literary agent, first with Scott Meredith, then with Scovil Chichak Galen, and now as an independent. In addition, she was the fiction editor of Realms of Fantasy magazine from its debut in 1994 until its closure after the October 2011 issue.
