= The Saga of Shadows =

Book by Kevin J. Anderson

- First edition, The Dark Between the Stars (2014)
- The Dark Between the Stars (2014); Blood of the Cosmos (2015); Eternity's Mind (2016)
- Author: Kevin J. Anderson
- Country: United States
- Language: English
- Genre: Space opera
- Publisher: Tor Books
- Published: June 2014–June 2016
- Media type: Print (Hardcover)
- No. of books: 3
- Preceded by: The Saga of Seven Suns

The Saga of Shadows is a trilogy of space opera novels written by Kevin J. Anderson. First announced in 2011, it is a sequel to Anderson's seven-book series, The Saga of Seven Suns (2002–2008). The first novel, The Dark Between the Stars, was released by Tor Books on June 3, 2014. The second book in the series, Blood of the Cosmos, was published on June 2, 2015. The third novel, called Eternity's Mind, was released on September 13, 2016.

In the story, the human and alien Ildiran civilizations have barely recovered from the universe-spanning elemental war chronicled in The Saga of Seven Suns, and now a new threat to their existence appears.

In 2015, The Dark Between the Stars received a nomination for the Hugo Award for Best Novel.

== Origins ==
Anderson published the seven-volume The Saga of Seven Suns series from 2002 to 2008. Discussing the forthcoming sequel trilogy, he said in January 2013 that despite the series' length and complexity he "had some major plotlines that just couldn’t fit within the 7-volume series ... I kept files and files of even bigger ideas that deserved full treatment, but I had to wait for the right time." After the Seven Suns series was completed, Anderson published the Terra Incognita fantasy trilogy, the Hellhole trilogy and began the Dune prequel trilogy Great Schools of Dune with Brian Herbert. He later said of this period, "After living for eight years in the Seven Suns universe, I needed to explore some other literary landscapes," noting that "all the while, a 'next generation' trilogy for Seven Suns was taking shape in my mind—The Saga of Shadows."

Anderson announced the new trilogy on his blog in December 2011. Citing National Novel Writing Month, an annual internet-based creative writing project that challenges participants to write 50,000 words of a novel during the month of November, Anderson said in 2013, "once I started The Dark Between the Stars, I plunged in headfirst, and wrote 120,000 words of draft in October and 120,000 words of draft in November." He called the book "my longest novel so far", and noted that the sequel series "has been building inside my imagination for many years, and it was like a hunting dog straining at the leash, ready to be released." He added, "I love having a story this big to play with, and all those characters to turn loose in the story."

Anderson has compared the Seven Suns and Shadows series to "really big" works like Star Wars, the Dune saga, Vernor Vinge’s A Fire Upon the Deep, Peter F. Hamilton’s The Night's Dawn Trilogy, Joan D. Vinge’s The Snow Queen and The Summer Queen, and has even called it "a science fiction version of George R. R. Martin’s Song of Ice and Fire".

== Setting ==
It has been twenty years since the events of The Saga of the Seven Suns, in which an ancient war among four elemental races is reignited and nearly destroys both the human race and the alien Ildirans. The new Confederation has governed human civilization across its many colonized planets since the end of the Elemental War, and relations between the humans and Ildirans are harmonious. Peace and commerce have been restored, with the Roamers back in the business of mining and selling the valuable stardrive fuel ekti (required for faster-than-light travel) and the green priests of Theroc providing instantaneous trans-galactic communication via their sentient worldtrees. But the malevolent Klikiss robots are plotting their revenge from exile, and soon find an ally in the ancient Shana Rei, the destructive personification of darkness and chaos which has awakened from millennia of slumber to destroy all sentient life in the universe.

== Book 1: The Dark Between the Stars (2014) ==
The Dark Between the Stars
- Author: Kevin J. Anderson
- Audio read by: Mark Boyett
- Series: The Saga of Shadows
- Genre: Space opera
- Published: 2014 (Tor Books)
- Media type: Print
- Pages: 672
- ISBN: 978-0765332998
- Followed by: Blood of the Cosmos

The Dark Between the Stars is the first book in The Saga of Shadows trilogy by Kevin J. Anderson, published by Tor Books on June 3, 2014. The trilogy is a sequel to Anderson's seven-book series, The Saga of Seven Suns (2002–2008).

Anderson revealed the novel's title in 2013, and subsequently chronicled its progress on his blog.

In April 2015 the novel was nominated for the Hugo Award for Best Novel.

=== Plot ===
Twenty years after the Elemental War, humanity is governed by the benevolent Confederation, and relations with the alien Ildirans have returned to their pre-war harmony. But the malevolent Klikiss robots are plotting their revenge from exile, and soon find an ally in the ancient Shana Rei, the destructive personification of darkness and chaos which has awakened from millennia of slumber to destroy all sentient life in the universe.

=== Critical reception ===
David Pitt of Booklist wrote in his starred review, "Anderson hits it out of the galaxy again: space opera doesn't get much more exciting, or much more richly populated with alien races, technologies, and cultures, than it does in this sprawling, engrossing epic.” However Publishers Weekly stated that "the multitudinous characters offer more variety than depth, the world-building strains for verisimilitude, and the complex plot comes to feel meandering and grandiose," adding that the novel "replicates the original series' flaws." Kirkus Reviews also said of the novel,"With a cast of thousands ... it's hard to remember who anybody is or what they do. Narrating in his usual breezy style, and untroubled by scientific fact, Anderson just lays it on with a trowel—and the upshot’s a book that’s so busy communicating everything in general that it forgets to be about something in particular."

== Book 2: Blood of the Cosmos (2015) ==
Blood of the Cosmos
- Author: Kevin J. Anderson
- Audio read by: Mark Boyett
- Series: The Saga of Shadows
- Genre: Space opera
- Published: 2015 (Tor Books)
- Media type: Print
- Pages: 608
- ISBN: 978-0765333001
- Preceded by: The Dark Between the Stars
- Followed by: Eternity's Mind

Blood of the Cosmos is the second book in The Saga of Shadows trilogy by Kevin J. Anderson, published by Tor Books on June 2, 2015. The trilogy is a sequel to Anderson's seven-book series, The Saga of Seven Suns (2002–2008).

Anderson revealed the novel's title on his blog in June 2014, and subsequently chronicled its progress.

== Book 3: Eternity's Mind (2016) ==
Eternity's Mind
- Author: Kevin J. Anderson
- Audio read by: Mark Boyett
- Series: The Saga of Shadows
- Genre: Space opera
- Published: 2016 (Tor Books)
- Preceded by: Blood of the Cosmos

Eternity's Mind is the third book in The Saga of Shadows trilogy by Kevin J. Anderson, published by Tor Books on September 13, 2016. The trilogy is a sequel to Anderson's seven-book series, The Saga of Seven Suns (2002–2008).

Anderson announced the title of the novel on his blog in January 2015.
