= Dennis Virkler =

American film editor (1941–2022)

- Born: November 23, 1941; Cleveland, Ohio, U.S.
- Died: September 15, 2022 (aged 80)
- Occupation: Film editor
- Notable work: The Hunt for Red October; The Fugitive

Dennis Virkler (November 23, 1941 – September 15, 2022) was an American film editor with more than 40 credits dating from 1973.

== Career ==
He was nominated twice for the Academy Award for Best Film Editing, and was elected as a member of the American Cinema Editors. The Fugitive (1993) was listed as the 39th best-edited film of all time in a 2012 survey of members of the Motion Picture Editors Guild.

== Death ==
Virkler died from heart failure on September 15, 2022. He was 80.

== Filmography (selected) ==
Editor
| Year | Film | Director | Notes |
|---|---|---|---|
| 1974 | Chosen Survivors | Sutton Roley | First collaboration with Sutton Roley |
| 1976 | Burnt Offerings | Dan Curtis | Third collaboration with Dan Curtis |
| 1978 | The Bad News Bears Go to Japan | John Berry | |
| 1980 | Xanadu | Robert Greenwald | |
| 1981 | Continental Divide | Michael Apted | First collaboration with Michael Apted |
| 1981 | Sharky's Machine | Burt Reynolds | |
| 1982 | Airplane II: The Sequel | Ken Finkleman | |
| 1983 | Independence Day | Robert Mandel | First collaboration with Robert Mandel |
| 1983 | Gorky Park | Michael Apted | Second collaboration with Michael Apted |
| 1985 | Secret Admirer | David Greenwalt | |
| 1986 | Miracles | Jim Kouf | First collaboration with Jim Kouf |
| 1986 | Nobody's Fool | Evelyn Purcell | |
| 1987 | Big Shots | Robert Mandel | Second collaboration with Robert Mandel |
| 1988 | Distant Thunder | Rick Rosenthal | |
| 1989 | The Favorite | Jack Smight | |
| 1990 | The Hunt for Red October | John McTiernan | First collaboration with John McTiernan |
| 1992 | Freejack | Geoff Murphy | |
| 1992 | Falling from Grace | John Mellencamp | |
| 1992 | Under Siege | Andrew Davis | First collaboration with Andrew Davis |
| 1993 | The Fugitive | Andrew Davis | Second collaboration with Andrew Davis |
| 1993 | Only the Strong | Sheldon Lettich | |
| 1995 | Batman Forever | Joel Schumacher | First collaboration with Joel Schumacher |
| 1997 | The Devil's Own | Alan J. Pakula | |
| 1997 | Batman & Robin | Joel Schumacher | Second collaboration with Joel Schumacher |
| 1998 | A Perfect Murder | Andrew Davis | Third collaboration with Andrew Davis |
| 2000 | The Adventures of Rocky and Bullwinkle | Des McAnuff | |
| 2002 | Collateral Damage | Andrew Davis | Fourth collaboration with Andrew Davis |
| 2003 | Daredevil | Mark Steven Johnson | |
| 2004 | The Chronicles of Riddick | David Twohy | |
| 2005 | Into the Blue | John Stockwell | |
| 2005 | The Fog | Rupert Wainwright | |
| 2006 | The Guardian | Andrew Davis | Fifth collaboration with Andrew Davis |
| 2009 | A Fork in the Road | Jim Kouf | Second collaboration with Jim Kouf |
| 2010 | The Wolfman | Joe Johnston | |
| 2011 | Shark Night | David R. Ellis | |
| 2012 | August Eighth | Dzhanik Fayziev | |
| 2014 | Angels in Stardust | William Robert Carey | |
| 2017 | The Ottoman Lieutenant | Joseph Ruben | |

Editorial department
| Year | Film | Director | Role | Notes |
|---|---|---|---|---|
| 1972 | Necromancy | Bert I. Gordon | Assistant film editor | |
| 1984 | The River Rat | Thomas Rickman | Supervising editor | |
| 1999 | The 13th Warrior | John McTiernan | Additional film editor | Second collaboration with John McTiernan |
| 2007 | Halloween | Rob Zombie | Additional film editor | |
| 2009 | Outrage: Born in Terror | Ace Cruz | Consulting editor | |

Additional crew
| Year | Film | Director | Role |
|---|---|---|---|
| 2008 | Bangkok Dangerous | Pang brothers | Creative consultant |

Second unit director or assistant director
| Year | Film | Director | Role |
|---|---|---|---|
| 1984 | The River Rat | Thomas Rickman | Second unit director |

Thanks
| Year | Film | Director | Role |
|---|---|---|---|
| 2002 | Swimfan | John Polson | Very special thanks |

TV movies

Editor
| Year | Film | Director | Notes |
|---|---|---|---|
| 1973 | Frankenstein | Glenn Jordan | First collaboration with Glenn Jordan |
| 1973 | The Picture of Dorian Gray | Glenn Jordan | Second collaboration with Glenn Jordan |
| 1974 | The Turn of the Screw | Dan Curtis | First collaboration with Dan Curtis |
| 1975 | Satan's Triangle | Sutton Roley | Second collaboration with Sutton Roley |
| 1975 | The Kansas City Massacre | Dan Curtis | Second collaboration with Dan Curtis |
| 1977 | Dead of Night | Dan Curtis | Fourth collaboration with Dan Curtis |
| 1977 | Dog and Cat | Robert Kelljan | |
| 1978 | Cruise Into Terror | Bruce Kessler | |
| 1978 | When Every Day Was the Fourth of July | Dan Curtis | Fifth collaboration with Dan Curtis |
| 1979 | The Last Ride of the Dalton Gang | Dan Curtis | Sixth collaboration with Dan Curtis |
| 1987 | Double Agent | Michael Vejar | |

Producer
| Year | Film | Director | Credit |
|---|---|---|---|
| 1980 | Stunts Unlimited | Hal Needham | Associate producer |

TV series

Editor
| Year | Title | Notes |
|---|---|---|
| 1977 | Dog and Cat | 1 episode |
| 1990−92 | Tales from the Crypt | 2 episodes |
| 2013 | Zero Hour | 1 episode |
| 2010−14 | Castle | 6 episodes |

Producer
| Year | Title | Credit | Notes |
|---|---|---|---|
| 1979 | Supertrain | Associate producer | 4 episodes |

== Awards ==
Awards
| Year | Film | Role |
|---|---|---|
| 1991 | The Hunt for Red October | Nominated for Academy Award |
| 1994 | The Fugitive | Nominated for Academy Award, BAFTA, and ACE Eddie |
