= Curse of the Black Widow =

- Promotional film poster
- Genre: Crime; Horror; Mystery; Sci-Fi
- Written by: Robert Blees
- Directed by: Dan Curtis
- Starring: Tony Franciosa; Donna Mills; Patty Duke; June Allyson; Vic Morrow
- Music by: Bob Cobert
- Country of origin: United States
- Original language: English

Production
- Executive producer: Dan Curtis
- Producer: Steven North
- Production locations: Piru Mansion - 829 & 837 Park Road, Piru, California
- Cinematography: Paul Lohmann
- Editor: Leon Carrere
- Running time: 97 minutes
- Production companies: ABC; ABC Circle Films; Dan Curtis Productions

Original release
- Network: ABC
- Release: September 16, 1977

Curse of the Black Widow is a 1977 American made-for-television horror film directed by Dan Curtis and starring Tony Franciosa, Donna Mills, Patty Duke, Vic Morrow and June Allyson. It originally aired on ABC on September 16, 1977 and was re-released in 1979 as Love Trap.

== Plot ==
For the past four years, Los Angeles has been terrorized by a series of mysterious murders, in which several men have been found dead with huge puncture wounds in their chests. The latest happens when private detective Mark Higbie is visiting a bar. A dark-haired woman with a German accent needs help with her car, and one of Higbie's friends goes out to help her. The woman makes a pass at him, but is turned down. Minutes later, the man is found dead.

Mark does some digging and finds out that Lieutenant Gully Conti, who is leading the investigation, knows who the culprit is, but is covering up details. He soon finds out why; all of the victims have had their bodily fluids sucked out of them, and the wounds are filled with spider venom. Each time, a mysterious woman named Valerie Steffan was in the area. Gully suspects that the twins, Leigh and Laura Lockwood, are somehow involved. Leigh hires Mark, concerned about the police focusing on her. It turns out that she dated all of the men who have died so far.

Mark eventually gets in touch with a former bartender who saw one of the murders, who tells him that at least one man was killed by a man-sized black widow spider. Checking further, he finds out that Leigh and Laura's father died in a plane crash several years ago, and one of the girls was nearly bitten to death by spiders. Mark finds out that the plane landed in an old vineyard owned by the Lockwoods, and meets an aging Native American who found the girls. The Native American says that according to an old legend, some women are affected by an ancient curse passed through the female line. During the full moon, these women turn into giant spiders in times of stress, kill their victims, encase them in webbing and feed on them. These women have a red hourglass-shaped birthmark on their abdomens, similar to those found on black widow spiders. They are practically indestructible in spider form; the only thing that can kill them in that form is fire. The twin who was bitten by the spiders is the one affected by the curse.

Mark calls Laura and finds out Leigh is on her way. Laura tells him that Leigh is the one who was bitten, and Mark tells her to get out as fast as she can. As Laura is in the midst of packing, she suddenly has violent convulsions and visions of two of the men who died. It turns out that Laura is really the killer. She has long suffered from multiple personality disorder; Valerie is the expression of her feelings of inadequacy compared to Leigh. Valerie is also the only one who knows how to use Laura's curse. It turns out that Valerie has made several advances toward Leigh's boyfriends; when they turn her down, she turns into a spider and kills them. The only other people who know the secret are their mother, and their former nanny, Olga. Their mother has been in a catatonic state since seeing Valerie kill Leigh's fiancé.

Leigh arrives and finds her mother in a panic. Suddenly, Valerie walks in, taunts Leigh and her mother by telling her about the things Laura never had the courage to say to Leigh. She also talks about how Leigh stole Laura's boyfriend, Gianni. She explains that Laura tried to win him back by seducing him, and unfortunately, Gianni ended up raping Laura and getting her pregnant. This caused Valerie to retaliate and kill Gianni, which was what their mother witnessed; she was babbling about Laura killing an Italian boy when Leigh found her, and it made her go crazy. Laura then turns into a spider. Horrified, their mother falls out of the window to her death. Valerie encases Leigh in webbing. Olga arrives minutes later and realizes Laura has to die. She goes to an old farmhouse to find Laura cowering on a stall. Laura admits that Valerie killed their mother, and hurt Leigh as well. As Olga pulls out a pistol, Valerie takes over, turns into a spider and kills Olga.

Mark finds the place deserted and goes to the farmhouse. He finds Leigh, alive but terrified. Just then, Valerie arrives in spider form. Mark empties his pistol into her, to no avail. He hurls a lantern at Valerie, and she catches fire. Leigh and Mark escape, while Valerie sets the farmhouse ablaze as she thrashes about on fire. The farmhouse burns to the ground and the police consider the ordeal to be over.

Sometime later, Mark is at Leigh's beach house for dinner, while Jennifer is shown playing on the beach with her dog. Leigh explains that Jennifer is adjusting to living with her, though she still has occasional nightmares, but with diminishing frequency. She has returned to school and is making new friends. She tells Mark that although Jennifer does not really look like her, sometimes she reminds her of Laura. Jennifer asks to go for one more swim before dinner, at which time she turns and waves to Mark and Leigh on the balcony, revealing a red hourglass-shaped birthmark on her abdomen, the same one that Laura had, indicating that Laura was her mother and that she has inherited the "curse of the black widow".

== Cast ==
- Tony Franciosa as Mark Higbie
- Vic Morrow as Lieutenant Conti
- Donna Mills as Leigh Lockwood
- Patty Duke Astin as Laura Lockwood / Valerie Steffan
- June Lockhart as Mrs. Lockwood
- June Allyson as Olga
- Sid Caesar as Lazlo Cozart
- Jeff Corey as Aspa Soldado
- Max Gail as Ragsdale
- Roz Kelly as "Flaps"
- Michael DeLano as Carlo Lenzi
- Bryan O'Byrne as Oakes, Zoo Watchman
- Tracy Curtis as Gymnast
- Irene Forest as Rita
- Bruce French as Summers
- Mari Gorman as Sophie
- Elizabeth Grey as Charlene
- H.B. Haggerty as Marion "Popeye" Sykes
- Crofton Hardester as Gianni
- Howard Honig as Harker
- Rosanna Locke as Jennifer
- Robert Nadder as Hank

== Reception ==
=== Broadcast ===
Curse of the Black Widow was first broadcast on ABC on September 16, 1977. ABC would later re-broadcast the film in 1979, under the alternate title Love Trap.

=== Critical response ===
Curse of the Black Widow received a mixed response from critics upon its original broadcast, with some criticizing the film's inadequate special effects and script. Videohound's Golden Movie Retriever's Jim Craddock rated the film a mixed score of two out of four bones. Mick Martin and Marsha Porter awarded the film two out of four stars, criticizing the film's script as being "recycled". In his book Television Fright Films of the 1970s, David Deal commended the film's cast, cinematography, and "old fashioned sense of fun". Deal then went on to note that, while the film was reasonably entertaining, its "meandering story" and 'forced sense of legitimacy' proved detrimental to its overall success.

The film was not without its supporters, however. Cavett Binion from AllMovie called the film, "[a] wonderfully cheesy TV movie-of-the-week". Fraser A. Sherman felt that the film was reasonably well-made and favorably compared it to director Dan Curtis' previous work, The Night Stalker, while also criticizing some of Curse's over-the-top and unanswered plot elements.

== See also ==
- Earth vs. the Spider (2001 film)

== Bibliography ==
- Craddock, Jim (July 9, 2004). VideoHound's Golden Movie Retriever: 2005. Thomson/Gale. ISBN 978-0-7876-7470-0.
- Deal, David (January 27, 2015). Television Fright Films of the 1970s. McFarland & Company. ISBN 978-0-7864-5514-0.
- Martin, Mick; Porter, Marsha (2003). DVD and Video Guide 2004. Ballantine Books. ISBN 978-0-345-44994-8.
- Fraser A. Sherman (September 3, 2015). Cyborgs, Santa Claus and Satan: Science Fiction, Fantasy and Horror Films Made for Television. McFarland & Company. ISBN 978-1-4766-1101-3.
- R. G. Young (2000). The Encyclopedia of Fantastic Film: Ali Baba to Zombies. Applause. ISBN 978-1-55783-269-6.
