= Frankenstein (1973 film) =

- Genre: Horror
- Based on: Frankenstein by Mary Shelley
- Written by: Sam Hall; Dan Curtis
- Screenplay by: Richard H. Landau
- Directed by: Glenn Jordan
- Starring: Robert Foxworth; Susan Strasberg; Bo Svenson
- Music by: Robert Cobert
- Country of origin: United States
- Original language: English

Production
- Producer: Dan Curtis
- Cinematography: Ben Colman
- Editor: Dennis Virkler
- Running time: 180 minutes
- Production company: Dan Curtis Productions

Original release
- Network: ABC
- Release: January 16, 1973

Frankenstein is a 1973 American television movie adaptation of Mary Shelley's 1818 novel Frankenstein; or, The Modern Prometheus adapted by Sam Hall and Dark Shadows creator Dan Curtis, with Robert Foxworth in the title role and Bo Svenson as the Monster.

== Cast ==
- Robert Foxworth as Dr. Victor Frankenstein
- Susan Strasberg as Elizabeth Lavenza
- Bo Svenson as The Monster
- Robert Gentry as Dr. Henry Clerval
- Heidi Vaughn as Agatha DeLacey
- Philip Bourneuf as Alphonse Frankenstein
- Robert Gentry as Henri Clerval
- Jon Lormer as Charles DeLacey
- William Hansen as Professor Waldman
- John Karlen as Otto Roget
- Willie Aames as William Frankenstein

== Production ==
The Robert Cobert score was not original to this film. Cobert used musical cues from Dark Shadows and Dan Curtis' adaptation of The Strange Case of Dr. Jekyll and Mr. Hyde.

The film was shown over two nights on ABC's Wide World of Mystery. Part 1 of the film was shown on the same night, and on the same network, as another of Curtis' productions, The Night Strangler. The film was quickly overshadowed by the more lavishly budgeted Frankenstein: The True Story which premiered later that same year.

== Reception ==
At the time of its release, the film garnered praise. Variety called the film "extraordinary entertainment." The Los Angeles Times said it was "quite a handsome show, with huge, foreboding sets and a splendid array of special effects." Radu Florescu's In Search of Frankenstein declared it "probably the most faithful rendering the screen has yet seen."

== See also ==
- List of films featuring Frankenstein's monster
