= Night Strangler =

Night Strangler may refer to:

== Criminals ==
- Richard Ramirez (1960–2013), American serial killer known as the Night Stalker
- Original Night Stalker, Joseph DeAngelo, serial killer and rapist unrelated to Ramírez, also known as the Golden State Killer.
- Minstead Rapist, an unidentified serial rapist operating in London since 1992, sometimes referred to in the press as the Night Stalker

== Other uses ==
- The Night Strangler (film), a 1973 TV film starring Darren McGavin

== See also ==
- The Night Stalker (1972 film), the predecessor to The Night Strangler
- Kolchak: The Night Stalker, a 1974 television series based on the movie, starring Darren McGavin
- Night Stalker (TV series), a 2005 remake of the original Kolchak series
