= The Great Ice Rip-Off =

- DVD cover
- Genre: Crime; Comedy
- Written by: Andrew Peter Marin
- Directed by: Dan Curtis
- Starring: Lee J. Cobb; Gig Young; Matt Clark; Grayson Hall
- Music by: Bob Cobert
- Country of origin: United States
- Original language: English

Production
- Producer: Dan Curtis
- Production locations: Universal Studios - 100 Universal City Plaza, Universal City, California
- Cinematography: Paul Lohmann
- Editor: Richard A. Harris
- Running time: 74 min.
- Production companies: ABC Circle Films; Dan Curtis Productions

Original release
- Network: ABC
- Release: November 6, 1974

The Great Ice Rip-Off is a 1974 American made-for-television crime comedy film directed by Dan Curtis. It premiered on ABC as the ABC Movie of the Week on November 6, 1974.

== Synopsis ==
The Great Ice Rip-Off a comedic heist film about a group of diamond thieves who use a bus headed from Seattle to San Diego for their getaway.

== Primary cast ==
- Lee J. Cobb as Willy Calso
- Gig Young as Harkey Rollins
- Matt Clark as Georgie
- Grayson Hall as Helen Calso
- Robert Walden as Checker
- Geoffrey Lewis as Archie
- Hank Garrett as Sam

== Production ==
The working title for the film was A Break in the Ice.

== Critical response ==
Variety reviewed the film as having "enough sharp corners to keep viewers alert, and Curtis' eye for human foibles manages to get laughs. Curtis picks up credit for being able to derive amusement from a caper film after the onslaught of the genre in recent years."
