= Bram Stoker's Dracula (1974 film) =

1974 television movie directed by Dan Curtis

- Home video promotional poster
- Also known as: Dracula
- Genre: Gothic horror Vampire
- Based on: Dracula by Bram Stoker
- Written by: Richard Matheson
- Directed by: Dan Curtis
- Starring: Jack Palance; Simon Ward; Nigel Davenport; Pamela Brown; Fiona Lewis; Penelope Horner; Murray Brown
- Music by: Robert Cobert
- Countries of origin: United States; United Kingdom
- Original language: English

Production
- Producer: Dan Curtis
- Production location: Yugoslavia; England
- Cinematography: Oswald Morris
- Editor: Richard A. Harris
- Running time: 100 minutes
- Production companies: Latglen Ltd. Dan Curtis Productions

Original release
- Network: CBS
- Release: 8 February 1974

Dracula (also known as Bram Stoker's Dracula and Dan Curtis' Dracula) is a 1974 horror television film, based on the 1897 novel Dracula by Bram Stoker. It was written for the screen by Richard Matheson and directed by Dan Curtis. Jack Palance portrays the title character, along with Simon Ward, Nigel Davenport, Pamela Brown, Fiona Lewis, and Penelope Horner. It was the second collaboration for Curtis and Palance after the 1968 TV film The Strange Case of Dr. Jekyll and Mr. Hyde.

The film aired in the United States on CBS on February 8, 1974. It received a theatrical release in other territories, including the United Kingdom.

== Plot ==
In May 1897, natives in Transylvania seem afraid when they learn solicitor Jonathan Harker is going to Castle Dracula. Jonathan finds Count Dracula abrupt and impatient to get things done. Dracula reacts very strongly to a photograph of Harker's fiancée Mina Murray and her best friend, Lucy Westenra. After preventing his brides from devouring Harker, he forces the young solicitor to write a letter saying he will be staying in Transylvania for a month. Harker climbs down the castle wall and finds Dracula's coffin but is attacked and knocked out by one of Dracula's gypsy servants before he can stake Dracula. They later throw him in the lower levels of the crypt, where the brides attack him again.

The ship the Demeter runs aground carrying only Dracula and the dead captain lashed to the wheel. Soon after, Lucy begins to fall ill. Her fiancé, Arthur Holmwood, is perplexed and calls in Dr. Abraham Van Helsing. Dracula arrives at the house in Hillingham and uses remote hypnosis to make the occupants fall asleep, he then turns his attention to Lucy. Entranced, Lucy awakes in a highly aroused state and, sensing Dracula's presence, is drawn outside to him and completely spellbound. After a brief and passionate seduction she is fully pliant and completely under his will and consumed by bloodlust, Dracula bites on Lucy's neck and feeds on her blood as she is in a helpless state of bliss. Van Helsing starts to recognize what might be happening, after Lucy is found, drained of blood, under a tree the next morning. Dracula has flashbacks of his wife Maria – of whom Lucy is the spitting image – on her deathbed centuries earlier.

Lucy's mother Mrs. Westenra is in the room with Arthur when Dracula comes calling the last time, a wolf shattering the window and attacking Arthur. Lucy soon rises from the dead and comes to the window of Arthur's home, begging to be let in. Arthur does so, delighted and amazed that she's alive, unaware that she is now a vampire under Dracula's control. This very nearly gets him bitten, but Van Helsing interrupts with a cross causing her to flee. They go to Lucy's grave and drive a wooden stake into her heart. When Dracula comes to the tomb later and beckons to her, he goes berserk upon finding that she's truly dead.

Mina tells Van Helsing about the news story about the Demeter, the boxes of earth, and Jonathan going to meet Dracula to sell him a house. From these clues, Van Helsing and Holmwood go about finding all but one of Dracula's "boxes of earth" (containing his native soil, in which a vampire must rest). But back at the hotel, the vampire hunters discover Dracula is there seeking revenge. He has bitten Mina and, before their eyes, forces her to drink blood from a self-inflicted gash in his chest.

The tracking of Dracula back to his home commences with Van Helsing hypnotizing Mina. Via the bond of blood, she sees through Dracula's eyes and discovers where he is headed. At the castle, Van Helsing and Holmwood find and stake the brides. Jonathan, now a rabid and bloodthirsty vampire, attacks Arthur and Van Helsing, but in the struggle is knocked by Arthur into a pit of spikes and killed. The final confrontation with Dracula takes place in what looks like a grand ballroom. Arthur produces a cross, temporarily keeping Dracula at bay, but the vampire throws a table at them, knocking it away. As Dracula attacks Arthur, Van Helsing pulls down the window curtains, and sunlight pours in. Dracula is weakened, giving Van Helsing the opportunity to pierce his heart with a long spear.

They leave him there. Before the portrait of a living warrior Dracula, with Lucy's past self Maria in the background, a text scrolls across the screen about a warlord Vlad the Impaler who lived in the area of Romania known as Transylvania, and how it was said he had found a way to conquer death – a legend no one has ever disproven.

== Cast ==
- Jack Palance as Count Dracula
- Simon Ward as Arthur Holmwood
- Nigel Davenport as Abraham Van Helsing
- Pamela Brown as Mrs. Westenra
- Fiona Lewis as Lucy Westenra / Maria
- Penelope Horner as Mina Murray
- Murray Brown as Jonathan Harker
- Virginia Wetherell, Barbara Lindley and Sarah Douglas appear as the Brides of Dracula
- George Pravda as the innkeeper
- Hana Maria Pravda as the innkeeper's wife
- Reg Lye as the zookeeper
- John Challis as the Stockton-on-Tees clerk

== Production ==
Dan Curtis decided to film Dracula in two locations: Yugoslavia, where there were old castles and quiet land, and England, where the remainder of the story is set. The exteriors of Dracula's castle were filmed at Trakošćan Castle in Varaždin County, in what is now Croatia. "Carfax Abbey" was portrayed by Oakley Court in Bray, Berkshire.

== Release ==
The initial CBS TV broadcast in October 1973 was pre-empted for an address by Richard Nixon on the resignation of Spiro Agnew. Instead it was broadcast in February 1974. In other territories, the film was given a theatrical release, and included additional scenes of violence not present in the original television version. It was distributed in the United Kingdom by EMI Distribution.

=== Home media ===
The film was released on VHS and Laserdisc. In May 2014, it was released on Blu-Ray by MPI Media.

== Legacy ==
In the 1990s Columbia Pictures and Francis Ford Coppola, who wanted to emphasize that his cinematic adaptation of Dracula would be unlike any that had come before, purchased the rights to the title Bram Stoker's Dracula.

In addition to the title of Curtis' movie, Coppola also utilized its two key elements which distinguish it from the novel and previous adaptations: the depiction of Count Dracula and Vlad the Impaler – the historical Dracula – as being the same person, and the relationship between Count Dracula (played by Jack Palance and Gary Oldman respectively) and his reincarnated wife: Lucy Westenra (Fiona Lewis) in the 1974 movie, and Mina Murray (Winona Ryder) in the 1992 film.

The Marvel Comics series The Tomb of Dracula features a Dracula whose appearance was based on Jack Palance. The series debuted in 1972, before Palance had actually played the role of Dracula. Artist Gene Colan was inspired by Palance's performance in The Strange Case of Dr. Jekyll and Mr. Hyde (1968), Curtis and Palance's previous television movie.

== See also ==
- Vampire film
