= Janos Skorzeny =

Janos Skorzeny is the name of two unrelated fictional characters appearing in American horror television productions:

- Janos Skorzeny (played by Barry Atwater), a vampire stalking Las Vegas in the 1972 American Broadcasting Company television film The Night Stalker
- Janos Skorzeny (played by Chuck Connors), the chief of a werewolf clan in the 1987-88 Fox Broadcasting Company television series Werewolf
