= Scream of the Wolf =

- Australian DVD cover
- Genre: Horror; Thriller
- Based on: "The Hunter" by David F. Case
- Written by: Richard Matheson
- Directed by: Dan Curtis
- Starring: Peter Graves; Clint Walker; Jo Ann Pflug
- Music by: Bob Cobert
- Country of origin: United States
- Original language: English

Production
- Executive producer: Charles W. Fries
- Producer: Dan Curtis
- Production locations: Universal Studios - 100 Universal City Plaza, Universal City, California
- Cinematography: Paul Lohmann
- Editor: Richard A. Harris
- Running time: 78 minutes
- Production company: Metromedia Productions

Original release
- Network: ABC
- Release: January 16, 1974

Scream of the Wolf is a 1974 American made-for-television horror-thriller film starring Peter Graves and Clint Walker and directed by Dan Curtis. It originally aired as the ABC Movie of the Week on January 16, 1974.

== Plot ==
Following a series of brutal murders committed by what appears to be an animal, Sheriff Vernon Bell asks local adventure writer and former hunter John Weatherby to investigate. Weatherby agrees and finds that the footprints left at the murder site appear to be that of a wolf, but that changed into a bipedal animal while leaving, and the animal has left no scent. Weatherby asks his friend, reclusive big game hunter Byron Douglas, for help, but he declines, stating that he feels the atmosphere of fear the killings create has made the townsfolk "alive" for the first time. Byron and Weatherby had previously gone on a hunt where they battled a vicious wolf that had bitten Byron.

Weatherby's girlfriend Sandy Miller is attacked in her home by the animal. She survives, but begins to believe the murders were committed by a werewolf, a belief that spreads to the rest of the townsfolk. Sandy also believes that Byron could be the killer, as does Sheriff Bell, who posts a police officer to stakeout Byron's house. The officer is mauled to death, and his body is found in a clearing far away from the house. After the town is put into a state of national emergency, Weatherby demands Byron's help once more, and he reluctantly agrees. The two hunt for the animal in the woods, splitting up. Byron is seemingly killed by the animal, which John tracks to Byron's house. John is held at gunpoint by Byron, who faked his own death by killing his assistant Grant.

Byron reveals that he was the killer, having faked the tracks with pieces of the animals he has killed over the years and covered his scent, and used an attack dog to kill the victims. Byron wants to hunt Weatherby and help him regain his killer instincts, and sends him out into the woods with a five-minute head start to find ammo for his rifle. Weatherby succeeds but is attacked by the dog, which he shoots. Byron then attacks him, only for Weatherby to reveal he had hidden a pistol, having known Byron was the killer and baited him into revealing himself. Byron walks away, only to be shot and wounded by Weatherby. Enraged, Byron rushes after him, only to be shot again and killed. Weatherby stands over his friend's body, contemplating what he has done, and then walks off into the night.

== Cast ==
- Peter Graves as John Weatherby
- Clint Walker as Byron Douglas
- Jo Ann Pflug as Sandy Miller
- Philip Carey as Sheriff Vernon Bell
- Don Megowan as Grant
- Dean Smith as Lake

== Release ==
The film originally aired on the American Broadcasting Company (ABC) on January 16, 1974.

The film is available on DVD via several public domain companies.

== See also ==
- List of American films of 1974
