= Intruders (miniseries) =

- Genre: Biography; Horror; Mystery; Science fiction
- Based on: Intruders by Budd Hopkins
- Screenplay by: Barry Oringer; Tracy Tormé
- Directed by: Dan Curtis
- Starring: Richard Crenna; Mare Winningham; Daphne Ashbrook
- Music by: Bob Cobert
- Original language: English

Production
- Executive producers: Robert O'Connor; Dan Curtis; Michael Apted
- Producer: Branko Lustig
- Cinematography: Tom Priestley Jr.
- Editor: Bill Blunden
- Running time: 161 minutes
- Production companies: Dan Curtis Productions; CBS Entertainment Productions; Osiris Films

Original release
- Network: CBS
- Release: May 17 – May 19, 1992

Intruders is a two-part miniseries that was first broadcast in 1992. Broadcast on CBS, the miniseries was directed by Dan Curtis and starred Richard Crenna, Daphne Ashbrook and Mare Winningham. It was partially based on ufologist Budd Hopkins' book Intruders: The Incredible Visitations at Copley Woods. Barry Oringer and Tracy Tormé wrote the screenplay.

== Plot ==
Lesley Hahn lives in California and is plagued by nightmares about faceless telephone repairmen entering her house and taking her. She contacts psychiatrist Dr. Neil Chase in the hope of receiving treatment for her nightmares.

Mary Wilkes is a housewife from Nebraska who has a history of unexplained blackouts and one night ends up on a highway miles from her home. She is also plagued by nightmares similar to those experienced by Lesley. Mary decides to take a holiday in California with her sister, who knows Dr. Chase, and is persuaded to see the psychiatrist to find out if he can help with her nightmares. Initially, Dr. Chase does not believe Lesley, thinking her nightmares to be related to childhood abuse, but becomes convinced something else is happening when Mary tells him of similar experiences.

Neil is struck by the similarities between the two cases and realizes that symbols seen on board an alien ship and drawn by Mary are similar to that of another patient of his, a former soldier who encountered a crashed UFO which was recovered by the government. Making contact with a university professor who does research into alien abductions, he begins to investigate the wider world of alien encounters and runs into an Air Force general who is investigating UFOs in secret. Finally, Mary is abducted again and learns the true purpose of the aliens.

== Cast ==
- Richard Crenna as Dr. Neil Chase
- Daphne Ashbrook as Lesley Hahn
- Mare Winningham as Mary Wilkes
- Susan Blakely as Leigh Holland
- Ben Vereen as Gene Randall
- Alan Autry as Joe Wilkes

== Reception ==
- Tony Scott with Variety: "Scaremaster Dan Curtis applies his directorial skills to a two-part sci-fi adventure, and the first two hours are whizbang stuff ending with a surefire cliffhanger. Thanks to a script by Barry Oringer and Tracy Torme, though, the second part falls to earth with a thud as sci-fi cliches shower all over the system".
- Scott Pierce with Deseret News: "The most surprising thing about Intruders is simply how dull it is. This story draaaags over two nights and four hours (Sunday and Tuesday from 8-10 p.m. on Ch. 5) without ever raising the level of excitement much above tedium. It doesn't help that half the movie treats it all as some sort of mystery when every viewer is aware we're talking aliens here".
- Tom Shales writing in The Washington Post stated: "Sound too incredible to be true? Nothing is too incredible to be true. The notion of aliens who come in the night and surreptitiously poke and diddle would help explain a number of things, from my sinus headaches to our Dan Quayle. But whether one scoffs or swoons, Intruders is too much fun to miss, the eeriest and daffiest miniseries of the year. It goes soggily Spielbergy near the end when we are asked to love, or at least understand, these aliens who reputedly have been snatching babies and doing intricate nasal surgery on unwilling patients. But until then, it's a wild ride on the edge of your seat".
- Patricia Brennan with the South Florida Sun-Sentinel: [Actor Richard Crenna said] "Personally, I must say that I think one always goes into a project of this sort with a certain amount of skepticism", he said. "The most convincing thing is the people I've dealt with. The sincerity of their retelling and recounting of their experience is so compelling". Crenna said he watched Budd Hopkins, a UFO investigator, hypnotize a woman who claimed she had been abducted by aliens. Then Crenna talked to one of Mack's patients. "The thing that is most convincing to me is not that these people have read the same copy of the Enquirer, but that these people are very, very reluctant to reveal their experiences. The stories that come out have been relatively the same story -- the figures, the symbols that they've seen. There is a kind of standardization of this tale among people who have no interaction whatsoever". So Crenna allows that perhaps something has been going on out there. "(Making the movie) caused me to be more open-minded in my attitudes about such speculation, and to not let my own fears close my mind to the possibility," Crenna said".
- Actor Ben Vereen was nominated for a Primetime Emmy Award for Outstanding Supporting Actor in a Miniseries or Special at the 44th Primetime Emmy Awards.

== DVD release ==
A DVD edition of Intruders was released in Europe on November 8, 2004. A DVD was also released in the USA in 2015.
