= The Turn of the Screw (1974 film) =

1974 American horror film

- Based on: The Turn of the Screw by Henry James
- Written by: William F. Nolan
- Directed by: Dan Curtis
- Starring: Lynn Redgrave
- Theme music composer: Bob Cobert
- Country of origin: United States
- Original language: English

Production
- Producers: Dan Curtis; Tim Steele
- Cinematography: Ben Colman
- Editor: Dennis Virkler
- Running time: 120 minutes

Original release
- Network: ABC
- Release: April 15, 1974

The Turn of the Screw is a 1974 American made-for-television horror film directed by Dan Curtis based on the 1898 novella of the same name by Henry James. The film aired in two parts on ABC on April 15 and 16, 1974.

== Plot ==
Miss Jane Cubberly, an English governess is hired to take care of two children, Miles and Flora, whose parents have died. Orphaned herself at a young age, Miss Cubberly begins to believe that the orphans are communicating with the ghosts of the previous governess Miss Jessel and her lover Peter Quint.

== Cast ==
- Lynn Redgrave as Miss Jane Cubberly
- John Barron as Mr Fredricks
- Eva Griffith as Flora
- Jasper Jacob as Miles
- Megs Jenkins as Mrs Grose
- Anthony Langdon as Luke
- James Laurenson as Peter Quint
- Kathryn Leigh Scott as Miss Jessel
- Benedict Taylor as Timothy

== Production ==
The film was shot in London, England. Megs Jenkins has also played the role of Mrs. Grose in the 1961 The Turn of the Screw adaption The Innocents.

== Broadcast ==
The film was first broadcast in the USA in two parts on April 15 and 16, 1974.

== Reception ==
In an article for the journal e-Rea, author Dennis Tready writes that the film "would have to be considered a landmark teleplay adaptation. Dan Curtis had long been intrigued by James’s short story, Archibald’s stage play and especially Clayton’s film, to such a point that he admits that The Turn of the Screw had a major influence on many episodes of his famous suspense series Dark Shadows."

M. Grant Kellermeyer of oldstyletales.com named it the seventh-best adaptation of the novella, writing that the adaptation "positively drips with the pleasantly campy atmosphere that made Dark Shadows a Gothic icon. [...] Cold, stark, and soapy, this is by no means a high-production masterpiece, but is in many ways among the creepiest adaptations I've seen."

Reviewer Jane Nightshade of horrornews.net called it "a surprisingly good made-for-TV movie" and wrote that "there are flickering candles, over-sized shadows, odd camera angles, secret casks of letters, and portentous musical cues galore. It can all get a bit tedious, but Curtis knows his horror, and inserts a good chill just when the numerous shots of Redgrave wandering in the darkness with a candle start to drag. Full marks to the child actors, Griffith as Flora and Jacob as Miles, with Jacob offering a somewhat different take on Miles (who's been upgraded in the script to teenage status): more sexually knowledgeable, more obnoxious, and more sinister."

== See also ==
- List of American films of 1974
