= The Norliss Tapes =

- DVD cover
- Written by: William F. Nolan
- Story by: Fred Mustard Stewart
- Directed by: Dan Curtis
- Starring: Roy Thinnes; Don Porter; Angie Dickinson
- Music by: Robert Cobert
- Country of origin: United States
- Original language: English

Production
- Cinematography: Ben Colman
- Editor: John F. Link
- Running time: 72 minutes
- Production company: Metromedia Producers Corporation

Original release
- Network: NBC
- Release: February 21, 1973

The Norliss Tapes is a 1973 American made-for-television horror film directed by Dan Curtis and written by William F. Nolan, starring Roy Thinnes and Angie Dickinson. Framed through a series of tapes left behind by the missing David Norliss (Thinnes), an investigator of the occult, it tells the story of his encounter with Ellen Sterns Cort (Dickinson), a widow and her artist husband James (Nick Dimitri) who has returned from the dead.

The film was originally produced by NBC as a pilot for a television series which was ultimately not produced. The film premiered as a standalone movie on the NBC network on February 21, 1973. Years later it acquired a modest cult following on the independent theater circuit.

== Plot ==
David Norliss, a writer working on a book debunking spiritualists and fakers, vanishes from his home in San Francisco, California, leaving behind a series of audio tapes explaining his absence and recent investigations. The narrative unfolds as his publisher listens to the tapes.

Norliss had recently investigated an incident reported by Ellen Sterns Cort, a widow who claims that she was attacked by her recently deceased artist husband, James, one night on their estate near Monterey. James, who had been suffering from a crippling disease, became involved in the occult after meeting a mysterious woman, Mademoiselle Jeckiel, who attended one of his exhibitions. Ellen says James was buried with a mysterious scarab ring that Jeckiel gave him.

That evening in Carmel, a young motorist is attacked in her car, causing her to crash and die. When she is found her skin is a dark grey, and a coroner later confirms her body was drained of blood. Norliss, not knowing about this, travels to Carmel to meet Sheriff Tom Hartley to discuss Ellen's claims. Later, Norliss and Ellen visit James' crypt on the estate and find the ring on his hand. Norliss goes to San Francisco to meet Charles Langdon, a gallery owner who had called Ellen inquiring about purchasing James's ring. Langdon learns that the ring was buried with James and tries to steal it, but the coffin is empty. As he leaves the crypt he is attacked by the ghoul James.

Norliss meets Mademoiselle Jeckiel, who warns him to stay away from the Cort estate. That night, Norliss and Ellen search James' art studio, where they find a large sculpture Ellen says was not there days before. The ghoul James attacks them. Norliss shoots him several times, but James chases them out of the studio. James rips off the door of their car, but they manage to drive away. Sheriff Hartley joins Norliss and Ellen and they find James' crypt empty. Ellen's sister, Marsha, arrives at the Cort estate hoping to spend the night. When she finds nobody home, she instead lodges at a nearby motel. James breaks into the room and carries her into the nearby woods.

Norliss' research discovers a series of tunnels had been built on the Cort estate during its construction in the 1920s. Lab results on clay from the large sculpture show it includes human blood. A frightened Jeckiel arrives. She tells Ellen that James has made a pact with the Egyptian deity Sargoth whereby he would create a sculpture through which Sargoth could enter the world. Jeckiel says that to stop James, his scarab ring must be removed.

Ellen and Jeckiel search the tunnels for James and find him resting inside a pine box coffin. Jeckiel attempts to remove the ring but James awakens and grabs her. Fleeing through the tunnels, Ellen stumbles upon Langdon's and Marsha's corpses. Norliss finds Ellen in the tunnels and they emerge in James' art studio. Norliss and Ellen hide and watch as James finishes the ritual that summons Sargoth and brings the statue to life. Norliss is able to destroy them by burning the studio to the ground in a manner that Mademoiselle Jeckiel had specified.

The publisher finishes listening to the tape, and wonders if Norliss's disappearance is related to the incident described on it. He begins to play another tape.

== Cast ==
- Roy Thinnes as David Norliss
- Angie Dickinson as Ellen Sterns Cort
- Don Porter as Sanford T. Evans
- Claude Akins Sheriff Tom Hartley
- Michele Carey as Marsha Sterns
- Vonetta McGee as Mademoiselle Jeckiel
- Hurd Hatfield as Charles Langdon
- Bryan O'Byrne as Mr. Dobkins
- Robert Mandan as George Rosen
- Ed Gilbert as Sid Phelps
- Jane Dulo as Sarah Dobkins
- Stanley Adams as Truck Driver
- Bob Schott as Sargoth
- George DiCenzo as Man In Langdon Gallery
- Patrick Wright as Larry Mather
- Nick Dimitri as James Cort

== Production ==
Originally written under the working title Demon, The Norliss Tapes was adapted from a story by Fred Mustard Stewart; writer William F. Nolan said that he took Stewart's basic premise of a "walking dead man" and adapted it into a teleplay that was mostly made up of his own ideas. The film was shot in San Francisco and Monterey, California.

== Release ==
The film premiered on February 21, 1973. It was later released on DVD for the first time by Anchor Bay Entertainment in 2006, licensed by 20th Century Fox. The DVD, now out of print, featured theatrical trailers as bonus material. In the 2000s the film underwent a brief revival on the cult movie circuit, with theatrical screenings in such locations as Toronto, New York and Los Angeles.

== Critical reception ==
Variety said: "Curtis directed the film with an eye to tension, and that he manages. The idea behind Nolan's script has validity, with its open dependency on the supernatural. The basic thrust, to scare, is what counts, and there Nolan, Curtis, Thinnes, and company succeed. The Hollywood Reporter also praised the film, calling it: "a lot of fun, with a new twist on the old vampire story." Maitland McDonagh of TV Guide also praised the film, calling it "a creepy, handsomely shot bogey tale that holds up surprisingly well."

In Television Fright Films of the 1970s, critic Dan Deal called The Norliss Tapes "one of the lesser entries in the Dan Curtis canon," faulting it for its "over-reliance on dialogue, shallow characterization, an unimpressive monster and too much shorthand logic."

== Bibliography ==
- Deal, David (2014). Television Fright Films of the 1970s. McFarland. ISBN 978-0-786-49383-8. OCLC 946776305.
- Senn, Bryan (2006). Golden Horrors: An Illustrated Critical Filmography of Terror Cinema, 1931-1939. McFarland. ISBN 978-0-786-42724-6. OCLC 163567664.
- Thompson, Jeff (2009). The Television Horrors of Dan Curtis: Dark Shadows, The Night Stalker and Other Productions, 1966-2006. McFarland. ISBN 978-0-78643-693-4. OCLC 930280271.
