= The Last Ride of the Dalton Gang =

1979 TV film

- Film poster
- Written by: Earl W. Wallace
- Directed by: Dan Curtis
- Starring: Cliff Potts; Randy Quaid; Larry Wilcox
- Narrated by: William Woodson
- Theme music composer: Bob Cobert
- Country of origin: United States
- Original language: English

Production
- Producer: Joseph Stern
- Cinematography: Frank Stanley
- Editor: Dennis Virkler
- Running time: 142 minutes
- Production company: Dan Curtis Productions

Original release
- Network: NBC
- Release: November 20, 1979

The Last Ride of the Dalton Gang is a 1979 American Western television film directed by Dan Curtis about the Dalton Gang. It is not entirely accurate, as noted at the film's beginning.

== Plot ==
The film follows the story of the Dalton Gang from their beginnings in Montgomery County, Kansas to their attempt to rob two banks simultaneously in Coffeyville, Kansas.

== Main cast ==
- Cliff Potts as Bob Dalton
- Randy Quaid as Grat Dalton
- Larry Wilcox as Emmett Dalton
- Sharon Farrell as Flo Quick
- Matt Clark as George "Bitter Creek" Newcomb
- Royal Dano as Pa Dalton
- Julie Hill as Julie Williams
- John Karlen as Charlie Powers
- Mills Watson as Bill Dalton
- Elliott Street as Potts
- Terry Kiser as Nafius, the reporter
- Bo Hopkins as Billy Doolin
- John Fitzpatrick as Texas Jack Broadwell
- Eric Lawson as Willie Powers
- Dennis Fimple as Blackface / Charlie Bright
- James Crittenden as Hugh McElhennie
- R. G. Armstrong as Leland Stanford
- Don Collier as Frank Dalton
- Dale Robertson as Judge Isaac C. Parker
- Jack Palance as Will Smith
- Harris Yulin as Jesse James
- Harry Townes as Rev. Johnson
- Jorge Moreno as Archulleta
- Tony Palmer as Stationmaster
- Mitch Carter as Gunfighter
- Don Scarbrough as Clay
- Larry Block as Leroy Keenan
- Bubba Smith as Luther
- Derek Wilcox as young Emmett
- Buff Brady as Buffalo Bill
- Dick Autry as Cole Younger
- Dean Smith as Deputy Sheriff Parker

== Production ==
Filming took place in Bronson Canyon, Columbia State Historic Park, Jamestown, and Sonora, California. The railroad scenes were filmed on the Sierra Railroad in Tuolumne County, California.

== Broadcast ==
The film was aired in a three-hour block at 8:00 p.m. on November 20, 1979.

A 1959 episode of the TV series Tales of Wells Fargo, starring Dale Robertson, cast in this film as Isaac "Hanging Judge" Parker, featured his character Jim Hardie encountering the Dalton gang at Coffeyville.

== Reception ==
John J. O'Connor of The New York Times complained that the film's three-hour length was "enough to ruin any spice."
