= Dead of Night (1977 film) =

- Genre: Horror; Mystery; Thriller
- Based on: "Second Chance" by Jack Finney
- Written by: Richard Matheson
- Directed by: Dan Curtis
- Starring: Ed Begley Jr. Ann Doran; Patrick Macnee; Joan Hackett; Elisha Cook Jr.
- Music by: Robert Cobert
- Country of origin: United States
- Original language: English

Production
- Producer: Robert Singer
- Cinematography: Ric Waite
- Editor: Dennis Virkler
- Running time: 76 minutes
- Production company: Dan Curtis Productions

Original release
- Network: NBC
- Release: March 29, 1977

Dead of Night is a 1977 American made-for-television anthology horror film starring Ed Begley Jr., Anjanette Comer, Patrick Macnee, Horst Buchholz and Joan Hackett. Directed by Dan Curtis, the film consists of three stories written by Richard Matheson (although the first segment, "Second Chance", was adapted from a story by Jack Finney) much like the earlier Trilogy of Terror. The film originally premiered on NBC on March 29, 1977. The second segment, "No Such Thing as a Vampire", was adapted from a 1959 short story by Matheson, which had previously been adapted for the BBC television series Late Night Horror. The segment "Bobby", an original script written for Dead of Night, was remade for the Dan Curtis omnibus movie Trilogy of Terror II.

== Plot ==
=== Second Chance ===
College student and vintage car enthusiast Frank restores a 1926 Jordan Playboy which was wrecked in a collision with a train in which the driver and passenger were both killed. He takes it for a drive and finds himself transported back in time. While exploring the area, he notices a couple driving off with the Playboy and runs in front of it to stop them. They briefly argue, with the driver insisting that the car is his own before driving off again. Frank realizes he cannot report the incident to the police without showing them his driver's license, and the date of birth on it would expose him as being from the future. Resigned, he takes a rest by the side of the road, and when he awakes he is back in the present, his car gone.

Years later, Frank's new girlfriend Helen McCauley introduces him to her parents, who own a 1926 Jordan Playboy. Her father tells Frank that if he restores the car, he can keep it in exchange for his getting to drive it one last time. Her mother recounts how he almost got them both killed in the car; he was driving towards train tracks and realized at the last moment that he would not make it across in time, pulling to a halt. His suspicions aroused, Frank checks the license plate and confirms it is the same car which was "stolen" from him during his trip back in time. He wonders if the car has a mind of its own and took him back in time specifically so that he would delay the McCauleys for the few seconds necessary to avert their fatal collision with the train. He also realizes that this alteration of the past caused the existence of Helen, who he loves and a few years later marries.

=== No Such Thing as a Vampire ===
A woman, Alexis, repeatedly awakes to find bleeding puncture wounds in her throat, making the entire household believe she is being victimized by a vampire. Terrified, all the servants save one, Karel, quit the household and spread word of the vampire attacks through the town. Her husband attempts to deal with the terror by adorning the house with garlic and searching local tombs, to no avail. He resorts to engaging the services of a friend, Michael.

However, after Michael arrives, Alexis's husband drugs him to make him sleep. He is in fact responsible for the "vampire attacks" on his wife, using a hypodermic needle to draw blood from her neck. He squirts blood from the needle across Michael's mouth and plants his unconscious body inside a coffin in the attic. He then summons Karel and contrives for them to find the seemingly vampiric Michael in the coffin. At his orders, Karel kills Michael with a stake. The entire situation was a scheme devised by Alexis's husband to murder Michael, who he believes was having an affair with Alexis, in a way that no blame could be attached to him.

=== Bobby ===
It has been some time since Bobby drowned, but his mother Alma still has not broken the news to her own mother. While her husband is away on business, she determines to raise Bobby from the dead. Armed with a magic book, she conjures up dark forces to bring her son back. Before she goes to bed, a thunderstorm approaches the beach house. Hearing a knock, she opens the door to discover Bobby. After she dries him off and feeds him, he explains that he never died at all, but was washed ashore and taken in by some strangers. Due to the trauma of his near-drowning, he only recently remembered who he is. However, Bobby acts completely mad. He cuts off the electricity and terrorizes Alma in the dark house with a sledgehammer and a butcher knife. Alma realizes that it is not Bobby who returned to her, but a demon, as he says "Bobby hates you, Mommy, so he sent me instead," revealing his demonic face.

== Cast ==
Second Chance

- Ed Begley Jr. as Frank
- E. J. André as Mr. McCauley
- Ann Doran as Mrs. McCauley
- Christina Hart as Helen McCauley

No Such Thing as a Vampire

- Patrick Macnee as Dr. Gheria
- Anjanette Comer as Alexis
- Elisha Cook Jr. as Karel
- Horst Buchholz as Michael

Bobby

- Joan Hackett as Alma
- Lee H. Montgomery as Bobby

== Home video ==
Dead of Night was released on DVD by Dark Sky Films in 2009. The DVD includes a 1969 TV episode, "A Darkness at Blaisedon" written by Dan Curtis and Sam Hall and directed by Lela Swift, which was the pilot for a Dead of Night television series that was never picked up. Dead of Night was released on Blu-ray by Kino Lorber, under the KL Studio Classics label, in 2025.
