= Eva Griffith =

British actress and historian (born 1963)

- Born: 1963 (age 62–63); Knightsbridge, London, England
- Other name: Eva Griffiths
- Education: Birkbeck College; King's College London
- Occupations: Actress and historian
- Parent(s): Kenneth Griffith and Doria Noar
- Website: www.evagriffith.com

Eva Griffith (born 1963), also credited as Eva Griffiths, is a British actress and a historian of the English Renaissance theatre. She began her career as child actress.

== Early life ==
Eva Griffith was born in Knightsbridge, London, the daughter of Welsh actor Kenneth Griffith and his second wife, Doria Noar, also an actor. In some of her acting work she has been credited as Eva Griffiths, her father's original surname. She spent part of her childhood living in the home of the actor Peter O'Toole; and she later lived with her maternal grandmother in St Albans, Hertfordshire.

She was educated at More House, a private Catholic school for girls in London, paying her fees with her own earnings as an actress.

== Acting ==
Griffith was auditioning for acting roles by the age of seven. Her first part was in the two-part television film Divorce His, Divorce Hers (1973), in which she played the daughter of characters played by Richard Burton and Elizabeth Taylor. She subsequently appeared in the horror film Voices (1973) and the TV film The Turn of the Screw (1974). She starred as the handicapped daughter of a ranch owner in the 1975 Disney film Ride a Wild Pony, set and filmed in Australia.

She later acted in stage roles, including parts in Scraps (a musical version of Hans Christian Andersen's "The Little Match Girl") at the Orange Tree Theatre, Richmond; Ibsen's The Wild Duck at the Yvonne Arnaud Theatre, Guildford, and later at the National Theatre, London; and Edward Bond's Restoration at the Royal Court Theatre (1981).

Television work included Coming Home (1981), a BBC situation comedy; a production of Arthur Miller’s The Crucible, also for the BBC; The Day of the Triffids (1981), Nanny (1981–2), a BBC historical drama; Young Sherlock: The Mystery of the Manor House (1982); Shall I Be Mother? (1983), a BBC Play for Today; and The Diary of Anne Frank (1987).

== Scholarship ==
Grffith had left school without A-levels, but in the 1990s she returned to extramural classes at Birkbeck College. She went on to study at King's College London for a BA, an MA, and eventually a PhD.

In 2013, she published A Jacobean Company and its Playhouse: The Queen’s Servants at the Red Bull Theatre (c. 1605–1619), a monograph study of the Red Bull Theatre, London, based on her doctoral thesis. She has also published a number of articles and chapters in books.

== Personal life ==
Griffith has one son.
