= The Strange Case of Dr. Jekyll and Mr. Hyde (1968 film) =

- DVD cover art
- Based on: Strange Case of Dr. Jekyll and Mr. Hyde by Robert Louis Stevenson
- Screenplay by: Ian McLellan Hunter
- Directed by: Charles Jarrott
- Starring: Jack Palance; Denholm Elliott; Tessie O'Shea
- Music by: Bob Cobert
- Countries of origin: United States; Canada
- Original language: English

Production
- Producer: Dan Curtis
- Running time: 120 minutes
- Production company: Dan Curtis Productions

Original release
- Network: ABC
- Release: January 7, 1968

The Strange Case of Dr. Jekyll and Mr. Hyde is a 1968 Canadian-American television film based on the 1886 novella Strange Case of Dr Jekyll and Mr Hyde by Robert Louis Stevenson. It was directed by Charles Jarrott, produced by Dan Curtis, and written by Ian McLellan Hunter.

It was one of a series of adaptations of famous novels done by ABC.

== Plot ==
The story follows respectable Dr. Henry Jekyll, who suggests to his colleagues that finding a means to separate the good and bad inherent in every human being, and eliminating the evil side, will help advance man's progress and survival. He has created a serum which he believes will accomplish this, but the very idea of it is rejected by his peers.

Angered by the response, Jekyll decides to self-experiment, taking the untested serum. The results are disastrous, it unleashes an immoral, depraved alter ego, Edward Hyde, whose existence eventually leads to moral decay and unchecked violence.

Hyde's presence becomes stronger and more frequent until Jekyll is trapped, realizing his hubris has created someone who may destroy him.

== Cast ==
- Jack Palance as Dr. Henry Jekyll / Mr. Edward Hyde
- Denholm Elliott as Mr. George Devlin
- Tessie O'Shea as Tessie O'Toole
- Torin Thatcher as Sir John Turnbull
- Oskar Homolka as Stryker
- Leo Genn as Dr. Hastie Lanyon
- Billie Whitelaw as Gwyn Thomas
- Rex Sevenoaks as Dr. Wright
- Gillie Fenwick as Poole
- Elizabeth Cole as Hattie
- Duncan Lamont as Sergeant Grimes
- Paul Harding as Constable Johnson
- Donald Webster as Garvis
- Geoffrey Alexander as Richard Enfield

== Production ==
Dan Curtis originally engaged Rod Serling to write the script and Jason Robards to star, with filming to take place in London. Robards, however, was unhappy with the script, and filming in London proved difficult due to a technician's union strike. Filming was pushed back, and Robards decided to drop out. With a new script by Ian McLellan Hunter and a new leading man in Jack Palance, Curtis decided to film in Canada, where it would be cheaper to do so than in the US.

Filming took place in Toronto over seven weeks in 1967. Curtis had to pay $200,000 to build a replica of Washington Square in Toronto, and Palance was injured while filming a stunt. The budget was approximately $900,000, of which ABC paid approximately half. The show was nominated for four Emmy Awards: Outstanding Television Movie, Outstanding Performance by an Actress in a Supporting Role in a Drama (Tessie O'Shea), Best Graphic Design, and Best Makeup at the 20th Primetime Emmy Awards.
