= The Winds of War (miniseries) =

1983 television miniseries based on Herman Wouk's novel

- Home video promotional poster
- Genre: War; Historical drama
- Based on: The Winds of War by Herman Wouk
- Written by: Herman Wouk
- Directed by: Dan Curtis
- Starring: Robert Mitchum; Ali MacGraw; Jan-Michael Vincent; John Houseman; Victoria Tennant
- Narrated by: William Woodson
- Composer: Bob Cobert
- Country of origin: United States
- Original language: English
- No. of episodes: 7

Production
- Executive producer: Michael P. Schoenbrun
- Producer: Dan Curtis
- Production locations: Yugoslavia; Austria; Italy; United Kingdom; West Germany; United States
- Cinematography: Charles Correll; Stevan Larner
- Editors: John F. Burnett; Bernard Gribble; Jack Tucker; Peter Zinner
- Running time: 883 minutes
- Production companies: Dan Curtis Productions; Paramount Television; Jadran Film

Original release
- Network: ABC
- Release: February 6 – February 13, 1983

Related
- War and Remembrance

The Winds of War is a 1983 American war drama television miniseries, based on the 1971 novel by Herman Wouk. It was produced and directed by Dan Curtis, while Wouk adapted his own novel to screen. Like the novel, the series follows the lives of the fictional Henry and Jastrow families as they intersect with the major global events of the early years of World War II. The series also includes segments of documentary footage, narrated by William Woodson, to explain major events and important characters. It stars an ensemble cast, featuring Robert Mitchum, Ali MacGraw, Jan-Michael Vincent, John Houseman, Polly Bergen, Chaim Topol, Peter Graves, Jeremy Kemp, Victoria Tennant, and Ralph Bellamy.

The series was aired in seven installments between February 6 and February 13, 1983 on ABC. With 140 million viewers of part or all of Winds of War, it was the most-watched miniseries at that time. It won three Primetime Emmy Awards (out of thirteen nominations) and was nominated for four Golden Globe Awards, including Best Miniseries or Television Film. The success of The Winds of War spawned a 1988 sequel miniseries, War and Remembrance, also based on a novel written by Wouk and also directed and produced by Curtis.

== Plot ==
The series follows the plot of Wouk's novel closely, depicting events from March 1939 until the entry of the United States into World War II in December 1941. It tells the story of Victor "Pug" Henry (played by Robert Mitchum), an American Naval attaché in Berlin and a confidant to President Franklin D. Roosevelt, and his family, and their relationships with a mixture of real people and fictional characters. A significant subplot of the series follows the activities of Adolf Hitler and the German General Staff, with the fictitious general Armin von Roon as a perspective character.

== Cast ==
=== Starring ===
- Robert Mitchum as Victor "Pug" Henry
- Ali MacGraw as Natalie Jastrow
- Jan-Michael Vincent as Byron "Briny" Henry
- John Houseman as Aaron Jastrow
- Polly Bergen as Rhoda Henry
- Lisa Eilbacher as Madeline Henry
- David Dukes as Leslie Slote
- Topol as Berel Jastrow
- Ben Murphy as Warren Henry
- Peter Graves as Palmer "Fred" Kirby
- Jeremy Kemp as Brig. Gen. Armin von Roon

Special appearance by

- Ralph Bellamy as President Franklin D. Roosevelt

Introducing

- Victoria Tennant as Pamela Tudsbury

=== Guest stars ===
- Günter Meisner as Adolf Hitler
- Wolfgang Preiss as Field Marshal Walter von Brauchitsch
- Reinhard Kolldehoff as Hermann Göring
- Werner Kreindl as Col Gen Franz Halder
- Alexander Kerst as Field Marshal Wilhelm Keitel
- Joachim Hansen as Field Marshal Alfred Jodl
- Anton Diffring as Joachim von Ribbentrop
- Howard Lang as Winston Churchill
- Joseph Hacker as Lt. Carter "Lady" Astor
- Michael Logan as Alistair Tudsbury
- Barry Morse as Wolf Stoller
- Deborah Winters as Janice Lacouture Henry
- Enzo G. Castellari as Benito Mussolini
- Sky du Mont as Count Ciano
- Edmund Purdom as Luigi Gianelli
- Lawrence Pressman as Bunky Thurston
- Scott Brady as Captain Red Tully
- Leo Gordon as General "Train" Anderson
- Ferdy Mayne as Ludwig Rosenthal
- John Dehner as Admiral Ernest King
- Andrew Duggan as Admiral Husband E. Kimmel
- Charles Lane as Admiral William Harrison Standley
- Logan Ramsey as Congressman Lacouture
- Patrick Allen as Air Marshal Hugh Dowding
- Hugh Gillin as Captain Jocko Larkin
- Ken Lynch as Rear Admiral Talbot Gray
- Richard X. Slattery as Admiral Bull Halsey
- Mickey Knox as Herb Rose
- Art Lund as Rear Admiral Moose Benton
- Allan Cuthbertson as Major General Tillet
- Barbara Steele as Frau Stoller
- George Murdock as Brigadier Gen. Fitzgerald
- William Berger as Phil Briggs
- Ben Piazza as Aloysius Whitman
- John Karlen as Ed
- Siegfried Rauch as Ernst Bayer
- Jacques Herlin as Paul Reynaud

== Production ==
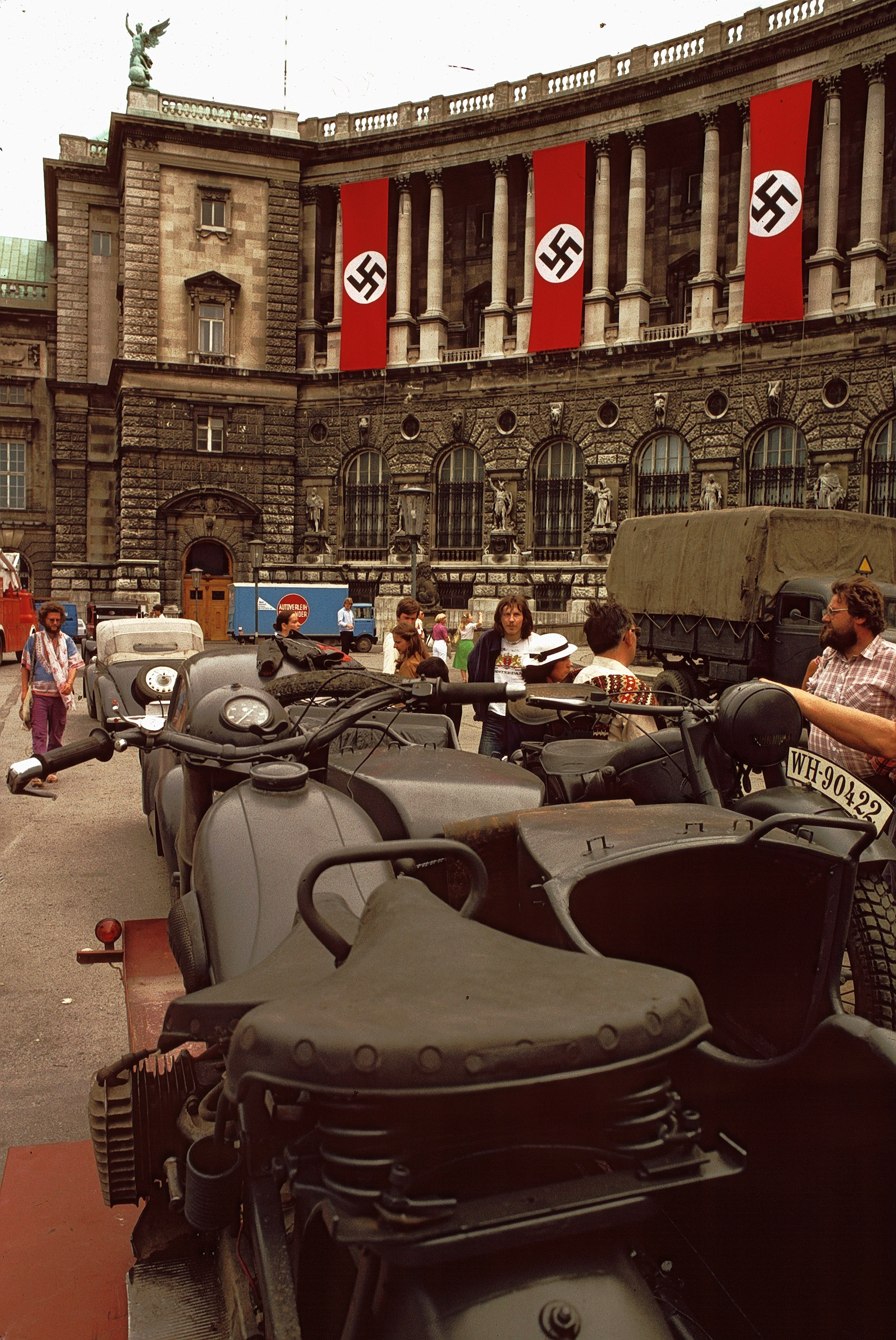
Production at the Hofburg in Vienna in 1981

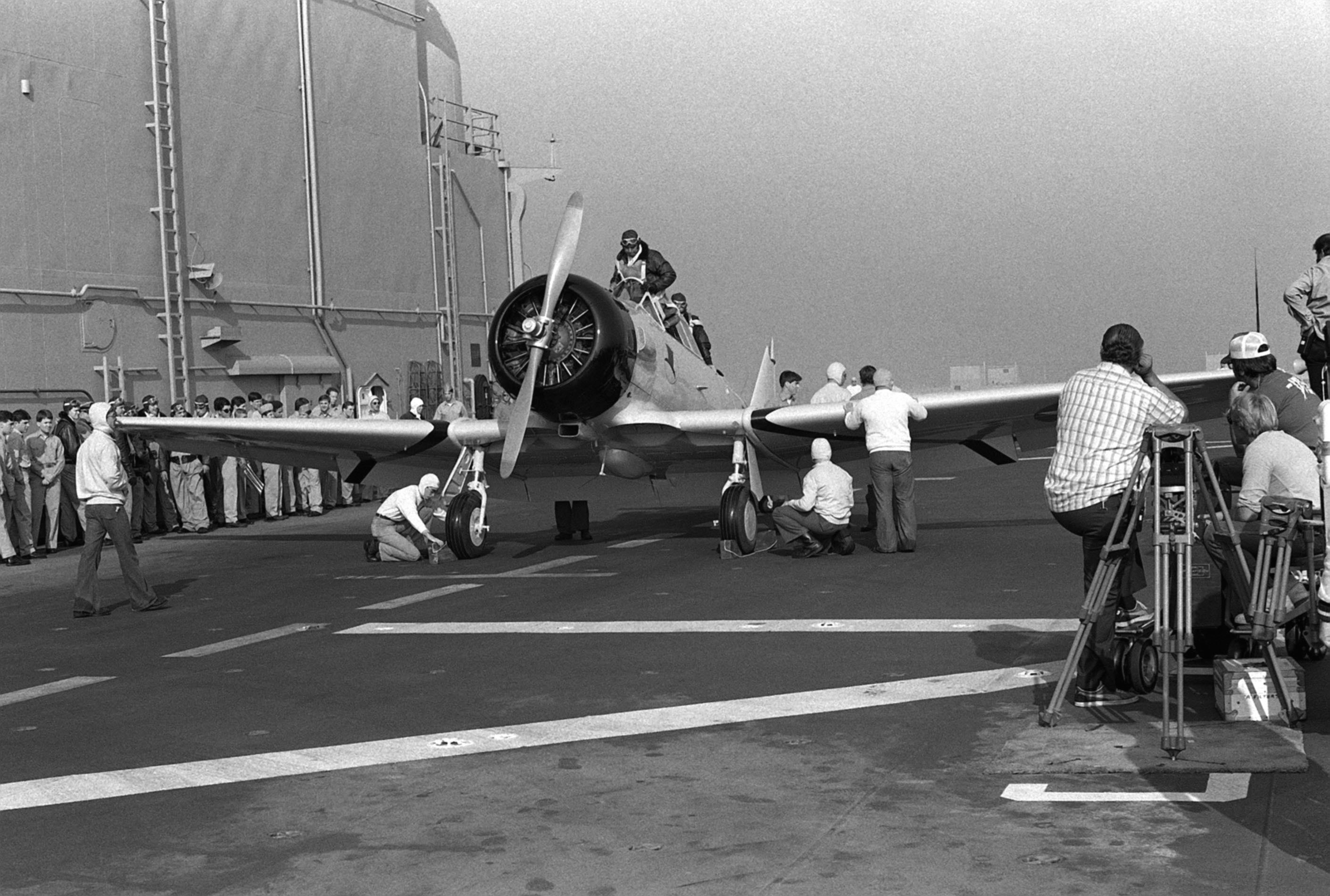
Filming on board USS Peleliu, December 7, 1981

=== Development ===
Author Herman Wouk was exceedingly pessimistic about a film adaptation of his beloved and scrupulously researched novel, because he had been extremely unhappy with earlier film adaptations of his novels Marjorie Morningstar, The Caine Mutiny and Youngblood Hawke. He was convinced by Paramount Pictures and the ABC television network that a miniseries would allow the full breadth of his epic story to be brought to life onscreen. Wouk required unusual control over the production in his contract, including considerable influence on the production and veto power over what products could be advertised during the miniseries and how many commercials would be allowed. Wouk also has a cameo as the Archbishop of Siena.

I, Claudius screenwriter Jack Pulman was originally hired to adapt the novel. He and Wouk worked for months preparing an outline. After Pulman died suddenly in 1979, Wouk himself wrote the teleplay for the series.

=== Casting ===
The casting of Lee Strasberg as Aaron Jastrow was publicly announced in February 1981. Strasberg had to withdraw from the production before filming any scenes, due to ill health (he died in 1982). He was replaced by John Houseman. Houseman later had to withdraw from the sequel miniseries, War and Remembrance, due to his own ill health (he died in 1988). He was replaced by John Gielgud.

=== Filming ===
Paramount produced the miniseries for $40 million ($129 million in 2025 dollars). ABC paid $32 million for the broadcast rights, then charged advertisers $175,000 for 30-second commercials and $350,000 for one-minute commercials. ABC expected simply to break even on the original broadcast and make any profits from later reruns and syndication.

Principal photography began on December 1, 1980 aboard the RMS Queen Mary in Long Beach, California and was completed (except for miniature photography) on December 8, 1981, on US Navy vessels at Port Hueneme, California, with filming of the recreation of the Attack on Pearl Harbor.

The series was shot at 404 locations in Europe, California and Washington state over 14 months. The 962-page script contained 1,785 scenes and 285 speaking parts. The production involved 4,000 camera setups and shot a million feet of exposed film. The production had a 206-day shooting schedule and came in four days ahead of schedule.

Principal locations were Zagreb, Opatija and Rijeka in Yugoslavia; Berchtesgaden and Munich in West Germany; Siena, Florence, Milan and Rome, Italy; London, UK; Vienna, Austria; Naval Station Bremerton in Bremerton, Washington and throughout the Los Angeles area and Southern California. Scenes were filmed onboard the USS Peleliu (LHA-5) and the USS Missouri (BB-63), the latter still in mothballs.

The opening scene sub-titled "Berlin" was actually filmed in and around the Hofburg in Vienna. The OpsRoom at RAF Uxbridge, from which the Battle of Britain fighter defenses were commanded, was only rarely made available to the public (though now the "Battle of Britain Bunker Exhibition and Visitor Centre" there in Uxbridge, west London, is fully open to the public). In the beginning of part 6, the train scenes were filmed at the Orange Empire Railway Museum with Ventura County 2-6-2 number 2.

Nazi concentration camp-survivor Branko Lustig was an associate producer in the miniseries and also on Schindler's List.

=== Music ===
The music was composed by Bob Cobert, a composer often associated with Curtis.

=== Use of stock footage ===
The production made use of battle scenes from other films during the attack scene on Pearl Harbor and during the German attacks on the Soviet Union, including scenes for both battles from Tora! Tora! Tora!

== Episodes ==
The miniseries was shown by ABC in seven parts over seven evenings, between February 6 and February 13, 1983. It had a runtime of 18 hours including commercials, or 14 hours 40 minutes excluding commercials. Parts One, Two, Six and Seven ran for three hours including commercials, while parts Three, Four and Five ran for two hours including commercials. It attracted an average of 80 million viewers per night.

No.	Title	Original release date	Rating/Share
1	"The Winds Rise"	February 6, 1983	39.1/53
2	"The Storm Breaks"	February 7, 1983	40.2/54
3	"Cataclysm"	February 8, 1983	38.7/53
4	"Defiance"	February 9, 1983	39.0/57
5	"Of Love and War"	February 10, 1983	36.1/51
6	"Changing of the Guard"	February 11, 1983	35.2/49
7	"Into the Maelstrom"	February 13, 1983	41.0/56

== Release ==
A premiere screening of the first episode was held in Washington, D.C. at the Kennedy Center on Thursday, February 3, 1983, three nights before airing on ABC. The screening was attended by members of the cast including Robert Mitchum, Ali MacGraw, John Houseman, Polly Bergen and Peter Graves. Producer/director Dan Curtis and writer and Washington resident Herman Wouk also attended, though Wouk refused all requests for interviews, saying "I'm a very private person." Also attending were Paramount owner Charles Bluhdorn, who hosted the event, as well as ABC Motion Pictures President Brandon Stoddard, Jack Valenti, Ted Kennedy, Robert McNamara, Art Buchwald, two senators, and numerous other Washington luminaries.

ABC released a 24-page "magazine for viewers" along with the miniseries. Published by the Cultural Information Service, the magazine contains a timeline of the series. It also includes features on the fictional character General Armin von Roon, historical figures including FDR, Churchill, Hitler, and Stalin, and events including the Battle of Britain. It also includes an extensive bibliography about WWII, the Holocaust, and other contextual material.

After running a massive year-long advertising campaign, which cost an additional $23 million, ABC reported that the miniseries had 140 million viewers for all or part of its eighteen hours, making it the most-watched miniseries up to that time, beating previous champ, Roots.

== Reception ==
=== Critical response ===
New York Times TV critic John O'Connor said that the "hoopla on 'The Winds of War' has been nearly as massive as the project itself. The result, while not as artistically impressive as 'Brideshead Revisited,' is less manipulative than 'Holocaust' and at least as emotionally compelling as 'Roots.'" Mitchum, he said, "manages to carry the art of acting to the extremes of minimalism. He moves like an imposing battleship." Most of the actors, he said, are "at least 10 years older than the characters they are playing." Overall, O'Connor said, "the story does hold. It rumbles along, creating its own momentum, until it eventually becomes the television equivalent of a good read that can't be put down."

Columnist Tom Shales of The Washington Post called the miniseries "bulbous and bloated" and said "a first-year film-school student could edit three or four hours out of the thing without hurting the flow at all." Watching Winds of War, he said, "ecstatic superlatives like 'competent' and 'acceptable' come to mind." He ridiculed the performances, and described the actors as too old for their roles. Winds of War was generally historically accurate, getting numerous details correct such as places, dates, and small dialog such as Hitler saying to Foreign Minister Ribbentrop, "Now what?" when the two heard of the British and French declaration of war on September 3, 1939—an important detail many documentaries get wrong (depicting Hitler's surprise that the Western powers would take action over Poland).

The show was a success throughout the United States and received many accolades, including Golden Globe nominations and various Emmy wins and nominations.

== Accolades ==
Award	Year	Category	Nominee	Result	Ref.
Primetime Emmy Award	1983	Outstanding Limited Series	Dan Curtis	Nominated	
Primetime Emmy Award	1983	Outstanding Directing for a Limited Series or a Special	Dan Curtis	Nominated	
Primetime Emmy Award	1983	Outstanding Supporting Actor in a Limited Series or a Special	Ralph Bellamy	Nominated	
Primetime Emmy Award	1983	Outstanding Supporting Actress in a Limited Series or a Special	Polly Bergen	Nominated	
Primetime Emmy Award	1983	Outstanding Cinematography in a Limited Series or a Special	Charles Correll, Stevan Larner	Won	
Primetime Emmy Award	1983	Outstanding Film Editing for a Limited Series or a Special	Bernard Gribble, Peter Zinner, John F. Burnett, Jack Tucker, Earle Herdan, Gary L. Smith	Nominated	
Primetime Emmy Award	1983	Outstanding Sound Editing for a Limited or Anthology Series, Movie or Special	Keith Stafford, Richard Adams, Denis Dutton, James Fritch, Robert Gutknecht, Carl Mahakian, Lee Osborne, Bernard F. Pincus, Edward L. Sandlin, Ian MacGregor-Scott	Nominated	
Primetime Emmy Award	1983	Outstanding Sound Mixing for a Limited or Anthology Series or Movie	Alan Bernard, Robert W. Glass Jr., William L. McCaughey, Mel Metcalfe, Robin Gregory, Allen L. Stone	Nominated	
Primetime Emmy Award	1983	Outstanding Individual Achievement - Costumers	Thomas Welsh, John Napolitano, Johannes Nikerk, Paul Vachon	Won	
Primetime Emmy Award	1983	Outstanding Special Visual Effects	Gene Warren Jr., Pete Kleinow, Leslie Huntley, Jackson De Govia, Michael Minor	Won	
Golden Globe Award	1984	Best Miniseries or Motion Picture Made for Television		Nominated	
Golden Globe Award	1984	Best Supporting Actor – Series, Miniseries or Television Film	John Houseman	Nominated	
Golden Globe Award	1984	Best Supporting Actor – Series, Miniseries or Television Film	Jan-Michael Vincent	Nominated	
Golden Globe Award	1984	Best Supporting Actress – Series, Miniseries or Television Film	Victoria Tennant	Nominated	
