= Ride a Wild Pony =

1975 Australian-American film

- Theatrical release poster
- Directed by: Don Chaffey
- Written by: Rosemary Anne Sisson
- Based on: A Sporting Proposition by James Aldridge
- Produced by: Jerome Courtland
- Starring: Robert Bettles; Eva Griffith; Michael Craig
- Cinematography: Jack Cardiff
- Edited by: Mike Campbell
- Music by: John Addison
- Production company: Walt Disney Productions
- Distributed by: Buena Vista Distribution (US); British Empire Films (Australia)
- Release date: December 25, 1975
- Running time: 91 minutes
- Countries: United States; Australia
- Language: English
- Budget: AU$1 million

Ride a Wild Pony is a 1975 American-Australian family adventure film produced by Walt Disney Productions, directed by Don Chaffey and based on the novel A Sporting Proposition (1973) by James Aldridge.

== Plot ==
Set in a small Australian town during the interwar period, the film follows the battle between two children, Scott, a poor farm boy, and Josie, the handicapped daughter of a wealthy ranch owner, for ownership of a horse that both children love. Scott requires a horse to ride seven miles to school and his father buys an unbroken pony, which Scott names Taff. Josie yearns to ride again but, having been afflicted with polio two years before, must settle for using a cart and pony. Scott's pony disappears, while a pony is eventually selected for Josie from her father's herd. When Scott sees the horse, which Josie named Bo, performing in the pony and cart competition at the township fair, he recognizes it as his horse and attempts to take it away. The ensuing quarrel affects both the children as well as dividing the town. The children eventually become friends and, while the ownership issue is legally resolved, they agree on a way of sharing the pony between them.

== Cast ==
- Robert Bettles as Scott Pirie
- Eva Griffith as Josie Ellison
- Michael Craig as James Ellison
- John Meillon as Charles Quayle
- Graham Rouse as Bluey Waters
- Alfred Bell as Angus Pirie
- John Meillon Jr as Kit Quayle
- Ron Haddrick as J.C. Strapp
- Peter Gwynne as Sgt. Collins
- Melissa Jaffer as Mrs. Pirie
- Lorraine Bayly as Mrs. Ellison
- Wendy Playfair as Mrs. Quayle
- Kate Clarkson as Jeannie Quayle
- Jessica Noad as Miss Elsie
- Neva Carr Glyn as Miss Gwen
- Gerry Duggan as Train Engineer
- Elizabeth Alexander as Miss Hildebrand (teacher)
- John Fegan as Town Doctor
- Les Foxcroft as Loafer
- Martin Vaughan

== Production ==
Although based on an Australian story, the film was originally intended to be rewritten to fit an American setting, but the producer, Jerome Courtland, determined that an Australian background would not detract from the film's potential for success in the US. As a result, the film was not only set in Australia, but employed a largely Australian-based cast.

Shooting began in October 1974 and mostly took place in the small town of Chiltern, Victoria. There was also some filming in the small country town of Bingara, New South Wales, where some of the cast and crew, including John Meillon, stayed at the Imperial Hotel for around 3 months. Several different Welsh mountain ponies were used in the film's production.

== Reception ==
The film opened on Christmas Day, 1975 at the Fine Arts theatre in Los Angeles and grossed $9,000 in its first week.

In 1976, The New York Times criticized the film as a "fundamentally uneventful and somewhat padded story", but a review for the film's video release in 1987 wrote that the film "was well acted, by adults, youngsters and pony...a film that children – and their parents – should certainly enjoy". Also in 1976, The Blade wrote that the film "combines an intelligent script, a generally excellent cast, and good production values in a film with broad appeal". The Daily Collegian also praised the film, saying that it contained "a refreshing amount of realism, and an emotional subtelty that is unusual for a Disney film".

The film was released on VHS in April 1987.

== See also ==
- List of American films of 1975
- List of films about horses
- Cinema of Australia
