= Supertrain =

1979 American television series

- Genre: Science fiction; Drama; Adventure
- Created by: Donald E. Westlake; Earl W. Wallace
- Starring: Edward Andrews; Nita Talbot; Harrison Page; Robert Alda; Patrick Collins; Charlie Brill
- Music by: Bob Cobert
- Country of origin: United States
- No. of seasons: 1
- No. of episodes: 9

Production
- Executive producers: Dan Curtis; Robert Stambler
- Producers: Robert Stambler; Anthony Spinner; Rod Amateau
- Camera setup: Single-camera
- Running time: 45–48 minutes
- Production companies: Dan Curtis Productions; NBC Productions

Original release
- Network: NBC
- Release: February 7 – May 5, 1979

Supertrain is an American science-fiction adventure drama television series that ran on NBC from February 7 to May 5, 1979. Nine episodes were made, including a two-hour pilot episode.

== Premise ==
The series takes place on the Supertrain, a nuclear-powered, high-speed train that is equipped with amenities more appropriate to a cruise ship. It has luxuries such as a swimming pool, shopping centers, a gym, a library, a medical center, and a discotheque. It is so big, it has to run on very broad-gauge track. Though it had a rated top speed of 250 mph (400 km/h), and cruised at 190 mph (310 km/h), the train took 36 hours to go from New York City to Los Angeles, which would put the train's average speed around 78 mph (126 km/h), slower than the moderately paced Amtrak Acela Express and well below the speeds of bullet trains in Europe and Asia; however, the first few episodes establish that Supertrain does not go directly from New York to Los Angeles, stopping in Chicago and Denver, as well as an unnamed stop somewhere in Texas.

Much like its contemporary, The Love Boat, the plots concerned the passengers' social lives, usually with multiple intertwining storylines. Supertrain was described in a 1979 Variety review, "It's a 'Love Boat' on wheels, which has yet to get on track." Most of the cast of a given episode were guest stars. The production was elaborate, with huge sets and two high-tech model trains for outside shots.

== Production troubles ==
Supertrain was the most expensive series ever aired in the United States at the time. The production was beset by problems, including a model train that crashed. NBC paid $10 million for a total of three sets of trains. A full-sized portion of the train with enormous passenger cars measuring 64 by 26 by 22 feet (19.5 m × 7.9 m × 6.7 m) was used mostly for terminal scenes. A model train at 1:9.6 scale was used for location exteriors using forced perspective, while a smaller 1:48 scale train allowed for shooting on studio miniature sets. While the series was heavily advertised during the 1978–79 season, it received poor reviews and low ratings, with 16.24 million viewers watching its premiere. The two-hour premiere was out-rated by a two-hour special of ABC's Charlie's Angels, and received a 21.8 rating and 32 share, ranking it 17th for the week. Despite attempts to salvage the show by replacing its producer and reworking the cast and the show's genre to a sitcom-like format, and a timeslot change from Wednesdays at 8:00 pm to Saturdays at 10:00 pm, it went off the air after only three months. NBC, which had produced the show itself, with help from Dark Shadows producer Dan Curtis, was unable to recoup its losses from the high production costs. This, combined with the U.S. boycott of the 1980 Summer Olympics the following season (whose coverage NBC was to have carried, costing the network millions in advertising revenue), nearly bankrupted the network. For these reasons, Supertrain has been called one of the greatest television flops. The show finished 69th out of 114 shows during the 1978–79 season, with an average 15.7 rating and 25 share. By the end of the series, the show had lost over half its audience, with only 7.08 million viewers watching the last episode.

Before the show aired in the U.S., NBC sold it directly to the BBC, the first foreign broadcaster to pick up the series. "For two runs, BBC reportedly coughed up more than $25,000 per hour episode, which if not a record series price in this market is close to it." The BBC was planning to air Supertrain in the fall of 1979, after the series premiered in the U.S. in February. By selling the show to international markets, NBC hoped to offset its own development costs. After the failure of the series in the United States, the BBC never aired the show.

== Reception ==
In 2002, TV Guide ranked Supertrain number 28 on its "50 Worst TV Shows of All Time" list.

In the May 19, 1979, edition of TV Guide, the show received criticism from Robert MacKenzie. He compared the futuristic train to his traditional ideas of a Pullman passenger car and describes the environment as "bigger, gaudier, and noisier, including the passengers." He described the amenities of the train and the "marvel, cinematically" of the set design and train itself. Mackenzie found fault with the show's reliance on the extravagant train to wow the audience and the lack of character depth or entertaining plot. "When the early ratings proved disappointing, NBC took the series off the air for emergency surgery. The 'All New Supertrain' appeared April 14 looking remarkably like the old Supertrain", which shows NBC's attempts to fix the show's flaws midseason. He summarized his opinion on the newly changed episodes by stating, "This tale d-r-a-g-g-e-d even more than previous episodes despite the attempt to glamorize it with models in bikinis and Peter Lawford playing his usual shopworn sophisticate." In his annual television special later that year, comedian Alan King commented on the show's ratings failure: "It's a bird! It's a bomb! It's Supertrain!"

Supertrain was critiqued by the Telefilm Review in the February 9, 1979, edition of Variety. The article begins, "NBC's highly promoted new Supertrain series features a slick new train of tomorrow, with a script from yesterday...it seeks to overwhelm, but underwhelms, instead." By emphasizing the train as the main character, the character plots and stories of each episode seem like more of a second thought. Telefilm predicted the show's failure in its review: "Without better scripts, the train's trek may well end in 13 weeks. More emphasis on characters, less on the train, is in order." The show lasted just over 12 weeks. The choices of the producer, Dan Curtis, were harshly criticized, saying he was "neglecting characterizations for the sake of camera angles, and his contribution is a sorrowful one."

== Episodes ==
No.	Title	Directed by	Written by	Original release date	U.S. households (in millions)
1	"Express to Terror"	Dan Curtis	Earl W. Wallace, Donald E. Westlake	February 7, 1979	16.24
Mike Post (Steve Lawrence), a passenger with a large gambling debt, finds himself the target of an unknown assassin on the train. A woman travels with her abusive boyfriend, who is hiding a dangerous past. Social director David Noonan (Patrick Collins) tries to stay clear of the amorous granddaughter of Supertrain's chairman and creator. In the opening credits, Winfield Root, the chairman of the fictitious company Trans Allied Corporation, mentions they will create an "atom-powered steam turbine machine capable of crossing this country in 36 hours." The maiden voyage left Grand Central Terminal in New York City 22 months later en route to Los Angeles. The Supertrain stops a few times, including somewhere in Texas, before arriving in Los Angeles at the end of the show. Main Cast: Edward Andrews as Harry Flood, Patrick Collins as Dave Noonan, Harrison Page as George Boone, Robert Alda as Dr. Dan Lewis, Nita Talbot as Rose Casey, Aarika Wells as Gilda, Bill Nuckols as Wally (credited as William Nuckols), Michael DeLano as Lou Atkins (credited as Michael Delano), and Charlie Brill as Robert Guest Stars: Steve Lawrence as Mike Post, Char Fontane as Cindy Chappel, Don Stroud as Jack Fisk, Keenan Wynn as Winfield Root, Deborah Benson as Barbara Root, Ron Masak as Fred, Don Meredith as Rick Prince, Vicki Lawrence as Karen Prince (credited as Vickie Lawrence), George Hamilton as David Belnik, Stella Stevens as Lucy, and Fred Williamson as Al Roberts Other Guests: John Karlen as Quinn, Frank Christi as Tony Packoe (credited as Frank R. Christi), H.M. Wynant as Fairmont, Anthony Palmer as T. C. Baker, Howard Honig as Sam Howard, Allen Williams as Riley, Parley Baer as Heaton, Sid Conrad as Whittington, Robert Karnes as Martin, Cameron Young as Fenner, Sylvester Words as Porter, Orin Cannon as Stationmaster, Chuck Mitchell as Big Ed, and Bert Conway as Workman Note: The pilot episode was a two-hour special.
2	"And a Cup of Kindness, Too"	Rod Amateau	Shimon Wincelberg	February 14, 1979	12.07
A man (Larry Linville) frantically tries to catch Supertrain, where a professed hitman (Dick Van Dyke) is targeting his soon-to-be late wife (Barbara Rhoades). Meanwhile, the spoiled great-grandchildren of Supertrain's chairman of the board make life miserable for the crew by playing practical jokes. The Supertrain stops in Chicago at the end of the show.
3	"The Queen and the Improbable Knight"	Charles S. Dubin	Brad Radnitz	February 21, 1979	10.13
A young travel reporter falls for a mysterious young woman riding on Supertrain, but both are unaware that she is the heir to a throne and the target of a kidnapping plot. The Supertrain stops in Denver at the end of the show. Guest Stars: Paul Sand as Barney Sweet, Mary Louise Weller as Ali (Alexandra Peters, future Queen of Montenegro), Michael V. Gazzo as Menkton, Nehemiah Persoff as Max (Ali's uncle), Steve Franken as Fleck (credited as Steven Franken), Fred Sadoff as unknown, and Kenneth Mars as Turley Other Guests: Alba Francesca as "Alexandra Peters", Paul Tuerpe (credited as Paul Tuerpé), Shauna Sullivan, Annie Starr as Theresa, and David Wiley
4	"Hail to the Chief"	Barry Crane	Robert I. Holt	February 28, 1979	9.24
A man knocks out and takes the place of his twin brother, a leading presidential candidate, on the eve of the election, but his deception becomes even more difficult when his campaign manager invites his estranged wife to help during the final campaign swing on Supertrain. This episode included a cameo of students from the Pasadena HS Marching Band. They played a reception band on the platform to welcome the candidate.
5	"Superstar"	David Moessinger	Larry Alexander	March 14, 1979	9.69
A has-been Hollywood producer sneaks onto Supertrain to convince his ex-wife, a famous actress, to star in his comeback film. At the same time, he has to avoid two hit men searching for him on the train, sent by the underworld figure who bankrolled the movie. Only an elderly woman is willing to believe and help him.
6	"Pirouette"	Barry Crane	Jeff Wilhelm	April 7, 1979	11.25
A bashful doctor finds himself rooming with an heiress who is hiding from kidnappers. Guest stars: Bernie Kopell, Joyce DeWitt, Isabel Sanford, Mako Iwamatsu, and Tony Danza
7	"A Very Formal Heist"	Barry Crane	Jeff Wilhelm, Brad Radnitz, Robert Stambler	April 14, 1979	8.72
Supertrain's newest crew members, Wayne Randall (Joey Aresco) and Penny Whitaker (Ilene Graff), attempt to track down a jewel thief who has stolen a socialite's necklace.
8	"The Green Girl"	Cliff Bole	Stephen Kandel	April 28, 1979	9.98
A participant in a poker tournament aboard Supertrain buys in with counterfeit money.
9	"Where Have You Been Billy Boy"	Barry Crane	Brad Radnitz, Max Hodge, Bill Taub	May 5, 1979	7.08
Barry Gordon and Rue McClanahan guest star in a bizarre comedy of errors about a weak-willed young man who holds some Supertrain passengers hostage while trying to plan his escape from the police.

== Home media ==
The pilot was released on VHS, as Express to Terror in the US, and Super-Train in the UK. It was also released in Norway.

== See also ==
- Breitspurbahn — broad-gauge railway planned by Nazi Germany
- Snowpiercer — A 2013 science-fiction film about a cruise ship-like train (with an aquarium and a swimming pool) that went around the world serving as the last resort of humanity in a new ice age
- The Big Bus — A 1976 comedy film that follows the maiden cross-country trip of an enormous nuclear-powered bus
