= Bob Cobert =

American composer (1924–2020)

- Born: October 26, 1924; New York City, New York, U.S.
- Died: February 19, 2020 (aged 95) Palm Desert, California, U.S.
- Genres: Film score, contemporary classical
- Occupations: Composer, conductor
- Instruments: Piano, clarinet, saxophone

Robert W. Cobert (October 26, 1924 – February 19, 2020) was an American composer of film and television scores.

He is best known for his work with producer/director Dan Curtis, notably the scores for the ABC gothic fiction soap opera Dark Shadows (1966–71) and the TV mini-series The Winds of War (1983) and its sequel War and Remembrance (1988), for which he received an Emmy Award nomination. Together, the latter two scores constitute the longest film music ever written for a film.

== Early years ==
Cobert was born in Brooklyn, New York in 1924. As a clarinetist and saxophonist, he worked summers with a five-piece band in the Catskills "Borscht Belt" during his college years. Cobert also played clubs in Manhattan, studied for a year at the Juilliard School, and did radio arranging for WOR-Mutual. He also did some early "ghosting," creating industrial-documentary scoring for established commercial composers, and wrote songs for bandleader Freddy Martin and jazz singer Frances Wayne. He also studied composition under Henry Cowell at Columbia University,

== Career ==
=== Film and television work ===
His early works include Dark Shadows, and the two tie-in feature films House of Dark Shadows (1970) and Night of Dark Shadows (1971). Cobert composed the scores for the 1972 TV movie The Night Stalker, the sequel The Night Strangler (1973), and the offshoot 1974–75 television series Kolchak: The Night Stalker. His other scores include the horror films Burnt Offerings (1976) and Scalpel (1977), the comedy film Me and the Kid (1993), and the television movies The Norliss Tapes (1973), Bram Stoker's Dracula (1974), Scream of the Wolf (1974), Melvin Purvis: G-Man (1974) and the 1975 sequel The Kansas City Massacre, The Turn of the Screw (1974), The Great Ice Rip-Off (1974), Trilogy of Terror (1975), Dead of Night (1977), Curse of the Black Widow (1977), The Last Ride of the Dalton Gang (1979) and Trilogy of Terror II (1996).

=== Other works ===
Cobert composed themes for game shows, the bulk of them associated with shows produced by Goodson-Todman Productions and Bob Stewart Productions. Of note are themes for To Tell the Truth (1961–1967 theme), Password (1963–1967 theme), Blockbusters (1980–1982 theme), The $25,000 Pyramid (1982 update, also used in 1991, and re-recorded in 2012 and 2016), Your Number's Up (1985 theme), Jackpot (1985–1989 theme) and Chain Reaction (1980, 1986–1991 theme, a re-make of the theme from Supertrain). Cobert scored multiple episodes of the 1963–82 NBC soap opera The Doctors and the 1964–66 ABC daytime soap opera The Young Marrieds, and the 1980–1981 CBS reality series That's My Line.

He composed several pieces for American violist John Peskey, including "Concert Piece for Viola and Small Orchestra"; Peskey commissioned and premiered them with the South Dakota Symphony, plus "Contrasts for Viola and Cello", "3 Moods for 2 Violas", and "Music for Only One Lonely Viola" for Peskey.

Cobert also taught composition at the University of Southern California.

=== Popular success ===
In September 1969, the original TV soundtrack to Dark Shadows, credited to the Robert Cobert Orchestra and featuring sixteen tracks written or co-written by Cobert, reached No. 18 on the Billboard 200 album chart. The song "Quentin's Theme" earned Cobert a Grammy nomination for Best Instrumental Composition, but lost to John Barry's theme to the film Midnight Cowboy (1969). A recording of "Quentin's Theme" by Charles Randolph Grean was released as a single, and in August 1969 it peaked at No. 13 on Billboard's Hot 100 and at No. 3 on its adult contemporary chart.

== Death ==
Cobert died from pneumonia in Palm Desert, California on February 19, 2020, aged 95. He was interred at Desert Memorial Park in Cathedral City.

== Awards and nominations ==
Award	Year	Category	Work	Result	Ref.
Daytime Emmy Award	1981	Outstanding Individual Achievement in Children's Programming - Music Composers and/or Directors	CBS Schoolbreak Special ("I Think I'm Having A Baby")	Nominated	
Grammy Award	1970	Best Instrumental Composition	"Quentin's Theme" (from Dark Shadows)	Nominated	
Primetime Emmy Award	1989	Outstanding Music Composition for a Limited Series, Movie or Specia	War and Remembrance ("Part 11")	Nominated	
