= The Night Strangler (film) =

- Jo Ann Pflug and Darren McGavin in The Night Strangler
- Genre: Crime; Horror
- Written by: Richard Matheson
- Directed by: Dan Curtis
- Starring: Darren McGavin; Wally Cox; Jo Ann Pflug; Simon Oakland; Richard Anderson; John Carradine; Margaret Hamilton
- Music by: Bob Cobert
- Country of origin: United States
- Original language: English

Production
- Producer: Dan Curtis
- Production location: 20th Century Fox Studios
- Cinematography: Robert B. Hauser
- Editor: Folmar Blangsted
- Running time: 74 minutes (TV premiere); 90 minutes (DVD)
- Production company: ABC Circle Films

Original release
- Network: ABC
- Release: January 16, 1973

Related
- The Night Stalker; Kolchak: The Night Stalker

The Night Strangler is an American made-for-television horror film that first aired on ABC on January 16, 1973, as a sequel to The Night Stalker. In the film, Carl Kolchak (played by Darren McGavin), an investigative reporter assigned to series of killings, comes to suspect the murderer is an immortal with superhuman strength.

The Night Strangler, though not as popular as its predecessor, garnered both strong ratings and positive reviews, eventually prompting ABC to order a TV series Kolchak: The Night Stalker. Neither writer Richard Matheson nor producer/director Dan Curtis was involved in the TV series. In the United States, the TV movie ran (without commercials) approximately 74 minutes. ABC planned to release the film overseas as a theatrical release and had additional footage shot, rounding out the movie to 90 minutes.

== Plot ==
Reporter Carl Kolchak of Seattle, Washington is assigned by his editor, Tony Vincenzo, to cover a series of killings in which the victims, all belly dancers, are strangled. Kolchak learns from the coroner's report that the victims' necks were actually crushed (a feat no human is strong enough to accomplish), they were drained of a few ounces of blood, and there were traces of rotting flesh on their necks.

Kolchak consults researcher Titus Berry, who discovers that there was a similar rash of killings in 1952. Kolchak is stonewalled by the police, who want to have details of the murders kept secret. Out of "burning curiosity," Berry researches further back, and learns of another series of murders in 1931. Berry and Kolchak discover that similar murders have been occurring every 21 years since 1889, with each series of murders taking place over a period of 18 days. Kolchak determines that the killer needs the blood for an elixir of life which keeps him alive for 21 years at a time. No one believes Kolchak.

Berry uncovers further clues in an interview with Mark Twain leading to a Dr. Richard Malcolm, a surgeon in the Union Army during the Civil War, who was one of the original staff at Seattle's Westside Mercy Hospital; the doctor claims to have found immortality with the help of blood. Though the hospital is long gone, Kolchak goes to the clinic standing on the site, in the hope that it might still have the hospital's old records. Inside the front door he finds a painting of the clinic's founder, Dr. Malcolm Richards, who is the spitting image of Richard Malcolm. Kolchak calls Berry to meet him there and proceeds to alter the painting to make the similarity more obvious. Berry is amazed, but the police are less than impressed, and Kolchak is arrested. Finally, Kolchak and Berry convince the police (and their boss Vincenzo) that the killer really is practically immortal, and that he will kill again.

Kolchak and Louise Harper, a psychology student who works as a belly dancer to make ends meet, want to stop the killer before he completes his elixir and disappears for another 21 years. In the Seattle Underground under the old clinic, Kolchak finds the preserved ruins of Westside Mercy Hospital and sends Louise to summon police. Kolchak finds the latest victim of the Night Strangler — an old tramp he had seen earlier during a tour of the Seattle Underground. Dr. Malcolm/Richards is alerted by Kolchak's stumbling. Malcolm admits having first tried the elixir in 1868 and that he hoped to spread the knowledge of immortality, but in 1889 he started aging and his family died in the 1889 Seattle Fire. He says he is working on making the elixir's effects permanent, but Kolchak thinks Malcolm is deluding himself and that he will continue the 21-year cycle indefinitely, so he smashes the elixir beaker. Malcolm starts strangling Kolchak, but without his elixir he begins rapidly aging to his true age of 147 years, which causes his hands to cramp up. Police burst into the room and witness Malcolm commit suicide by jumping through a high window.

Vincenzo redacts the supernatural elements of Kolchak's story, leaving it to state that the killer was found but his identity is unknown. Kolchak argues with Vincenzo and storms out in a fury. To keep the incident under wraps, Vincenzo is fired and Louise is expelled. Once again unemployed, Kolchak bickers with Vincenzo and Louise as Kolchak drives the three of them to New York City.

== Cast ==
- Darren McGavin as Carl Kolchak
- Jo Ann Pflug as Louise Harper
- Simon Oakland as Tony Vincenzo
- Scott Brady as Capt. Roscoe Schubert
- Wally Cox as Titus Berry
- Margaret Hamilton as Prof. Hester Crabwell
- John Carradine as Llewellyn Crossbinder
- Al Lewis as Tramp
- Nina Wayne as Charisma Beauty
- Virginia Peters as Wilma Krankheimer
- Kate Murtagh as Janie Watkins
- Ivor Francis as Dr. Christopher Webb
- Diane Shalet as Joyce Gabriel
- Anne Randall as Policewoman Sheila
- Francoise Birnheim as Restaurant Woman
- Richard Anderson as Dr. Richard Malcolm/Dr. Malcolm Richards

== Novelization ==
The novelization of The Night Strangler was written by Jeff Rice, author of the novel on which The Night Stalker was based. In the novelization, it is strongly hinted that the immortal villain, Dr. Richard Malcolm, is actually the Count of St. Germain. When asked directly, Malcolm laughs ironically but does not deny it.

== Sequel ==
A third film was planned, based on a story by Richard Matheson, but completed by science fiction and horror novelist William F. Nolan; the two share credit on the unproduced script. The third film was set aside when ABC elected to order the television series and have it produced by Universal. None of the original participants, aside from actors Darren McGavin and Simon Oakland, appeared in the television series Kolchak: The Night Stalker.

Titled The Night Killers and set in Honolulu, Hawaii, the script had Tony Vincenzo (Oakland) hiring Carl Kolchak (McGavin) to work for him. Once again, Kolchak discovers a cover-up — this time involving a mysterious UFO, a nuclear power plant and important people being murdered and replaced by androids. Kolchak ties all of this together, believing that the aliens on the UFO landed on Earth intending to set up a colony and replacing key government figures with these androids to assist them in establishing their secret colony.

Although The Night Killers was never produced, a prose adaptation was published by Moonstone Books, and a limited edition of the film's actual script was released.

== Home media ==
The film was released on a double feature DVD with The Night Stalker by MGM Home Entertainment in 2004. Both films were given new transfers and issued (separately) on Blu-Ray and DVD by Kino Lorber in 2018.

== See also ==
- Kolchak: The Night Stalker, a 1974 television series based on the movies, also starring Darren McGavin.
- Night Stalker, a 2005 remake of the original Kolchak series with Stuart Townsend as Carl Kolchak.
- "Squeeze", an episode of The X-Files with a similar plot.
