= Dan Curtis =

American television and film director, writer, and producer (1927–2006)

- Born: Daniel Mayer Cherkoss; August 12, 1927; Bridgeport, Connecticut, U.S.
- Died: March 27, 2006 (aged 78); Brentwood, California, U.S.
- Education: Syracuse University (B.A., 1950)
- Occupations: Director, screenwriter, producer
- Notable work: Dark Shadows; The Winds of War; War and Remembrance
- Spouse: Norma Mae Klein (m. 1952; died 2006)
- Children: 3
- Awards: See below

Daniel Mayer Cherkoss (August 12, 1927 – March 27, 2006), known by his pen name Dan Curtis, was an American television and film director, screenwriter, and producer. He was best known as the creator of the gothic soap opera Dark Shadows (1966–71), and for directing the epic World War II miniseries The Winds of War (1983) and War and Remembrance (1988).

Curtis is also known to horror film fans for his work on several horror-themed television series and films, including The Night Stalker (1972) and its sequel The Night Strangler (1973), Bram Stoker's Dracula (1974) and Trilogy of Terror (1975). He also directed three feature films – the Dark Shadows spinoffs House of Dark Shadows (1970) and Night of Dark Shadows (1971), and the supernatural horror Burnt Offerings (1976).

Curtis was nominated for five Primetime Emmy Awards, winning Outstanding Limited Series for War and Remembrance at the 41st Primetime Emmy Awards, for which he also won the Directors Guild of America Award for Outstanding Directorial Achievement in Dramatic Specials at the 42nd Directors Guild of America Awards. He also won the Saturn Award for Best Director for Burnt Offerings.

== Early life ==
Curtis was born Daniel Mayer Cherkoss to a Jewish parents in Bridgeport, Connecticut. His father, Edward Cherkoss, was a dentist. His mother, Mildred, died when he was a 13-years-old. He studied Sociology at Syracuse University, where he met his wife Norma Mae Klein. After graduating in 1950, he worked as a syndicated television show salesman, before landing at NBC.

== Career ==
Curtis formed his own production company, and achieved his first notable success with the Emmy-winning golf program CBS Match Play Classic.

In 1966, he created the gothic soap opera Dark Shadows, which became a cult hit and ran until 1971. Curtis's series of macabre films include House of Dark Shadows, Night of Dark Shadows, The Night Stalker (for many years holding the record ratings of the most-watched TV movie—and inspired the series Kolchak: The Night Stalker), Intruders, The Night Strangler, Burnt Offerings, Trilogy of Terror and its belated sequel Trilogy of Terror II, The Norliss Tapes (a 1973 pilot for an unproduced series starring Roy Thinnes), Curse of the Black Widow, Dead of Night (1977), and Scream of the Wolf. He worked frequently with sci-fi/horror writers Richard Matheson and William F. Nolan.

Curtis was producer and/or director of several television adaptations of classic horror texts including The Strange Case of Dr. Jekyll and Mr. Hyde (1968), Frankenstein (1973), The Picture of Dorian Gray (1973), Dracula (1974), and The Turn of the Screw (1974).

In 1978, Curtis made a departure from his usual macabre offerings, when he wrote, produced, and directed the sentimental NBC television film When Every Day Was the Fourth of July. Although fictionalized, the film was semi-autobiographical, based on his childhood growing up in Bridgeport, Connecticut, in the 1930s. The film was originally intended to be a pilot for a potential series, but when the series was not picked up by the NBC network, Curtis produced and directed the 1980 television movie sequel The Long Days of Summer, this time airing on the ABC network. His 1983 miniseries The Winds of War, the most watched miniseries in American television history, was nominated for four Emmy Awards at the 35th Primetime Emmy Awards.

Curtis also directed the War and Remembrance miniseries, which was the continuation of The Winds of War. The program was 30 hours in length, split into two segments. Chapters I-VII aired in November 1988. The remaining five parts, Chapters VIII-XII, were billed as "The Final Chapter", and aired in May 1989. The miniseries received 15 Emmy Award nominations at the 41st Primetime Emmy Awards, including for Best Actor (John Gielgud), Best Actress (Jane Seymour), Supporting Actor (Barry Bostwick), and Supporting Actress (Polly Bergen). The show won Emmys for Best Miniseries, Special Effects, and Single-Camera Production Editing. The New York Times profiled Curtis while in post-production on War and Remembrance.

Curtis's rights to Dark Shadows remain with his estate, which signed a deal with Warner Bros. for a 2012 Dark Shadows movie. The film stars Johnny Depp as Barnabas Collins, was directed by Tim Burton, and was released in May 2012. After the film's end credits, there is a dedication to Dan Curtis. In 2023, Curtis was inducted into the Rondo Hatton Classic Horror Awards' Monster Kid Hall of Fame.

== Personal life ==
Curtis and his wife Norma had three daughters – Cathy, Tracy and Linda (died 1975).

=== Death ===
Curtis died of a brain tumor on March 27, 2006 at age 78, at his home in Brentwood, Los Angeles, California, 20 days after the death of his wife by Alzheimer's disease. He was buried at Eden Memorial Park Cemetery.

== Filmography ==
=== Film ===
Year	Title	Functioned as			Notes
Year	Title	Director	Writer	Producer	Notes
1970	House of Dark Shadows	Yes	Characters	Yes	
1971	Night of Dark Shadows	Yes	Story	Yes	
1976	Burnt Offerings	Yes	Yes	Yes	
1986	St. John in Exile	Yes	No	No	
1993	Me and the Kid	Yes	No	Yes	
2012	Dark Shadows	No	Characters	No	Posthumous release

=== Television ===
Year	Title	Functioned as				Notes
Year	Title	Director	Writer	Producer	Exec. Producer	Notes
1966–71	Dark Shadows	Yes	Creator	Yes	Yes	Director; 21 episodes; Exec. Producer; 1225 episodes
1973	ABC Movie of the Week	No	No	Yes	No	Episode: "The Picture of Dorian Gray"
1973–74	The Wide World of Mystery	Yes	Yes	Yes	Yes	Director; 1 episode; Writer; 2 episodes; Producer; 2 episodes; Exec. Producer; 4 episodes
1979	Supertrain	Yes	No	No	Yes	Director; 1 episode; Exec. Producer; 5 episodes
1991	Dark Shadows	No	Creator	No	Yes	12 episodes
2005–06	Night Stalker	No	No	Consulting	No	10 episodes

==== TV films, miniseries, and specials ====
Year	Title	Functioned as			
Year	Title	Director	Writer	Producer	Exec. Producer
1968	The Strange Case of Dr. Jekyll and Mr. Hyde	No	No	Yes	No
1969	Dead of Night: A Darkness at Blaisedon	No	Yes	Yes	No
1972	The Night Stalker	No	No	Yes	No
1973	Frankenstein	No	Yes	Yes	No
1973	The Night Strangler	Yes	No	Yes	No
1973	The Norliss Tapes	Yes	No	Yes	No
1973	The Invasion of Carol Enders	Yes	No	Yes	No
1974	Scream of the Wolf	Yes	No	Yes	No
1974	Bram Stoker's Dracula	Yes	No	Yes	No
1974	Melvin Purvis: G-Man	Yes	No	Yes	No
1974	The Turn of the Screw	Yes	No	Yes	No
1974	The Great Ice Rip-Off	Yes	No	Yes	No
1975	Trilogy of Terror	Yes	No	Yes	No
1975	The Kansas City Massacre	Yes	Yes	Yes	No
1977	Dead of Night	Yes	No	Yes	No
1977	Curse of the Black Widow	Yes	No	Yes	No
1978	When Every Day Was the Fourth of July	Yes	Story	Yes	No
1979	Mrs. R's Daughter	Yes	No	No	Yes
1979	The Last Ride of the Dalton Gang	Yes	No	No	No
1980	The Long Days of Summer	Yes	No	No	Yes
1982	The Big Easy	No	No	No	Yes
1983	The Winds of War	Yes	No	Yes	No
1988	War and Remembrance	Yes	Yes	No	Yes
1992	Angie, the Lieutenant	No	No	No	Yes
1992	Intruders	Yes	No	No	Yes
1993	Me and the Kid	Yes	No	No	No
1996	Trilogy of Terror II	Yes	Yes	No	No
1998	The Love Letter	Yes	No	No	Yes
2004	Dark Shadows	No	Creator	No	Yes
2005	Saving Milly	Yes	No	No	Yes
2005	Our Fathers	Yes	No	No	Yes

== Awards and nominations ==
Institution	Year	Category	Work	Result	Ref.
Directors Guild of America Awards	1989	Outstanding Directorial Achievement in Dramatic Series	War and Remembrance	Nominated	
Directors Guild of America Awards	1990	Outstanding Directorial Achievement in Dramatic Series	War and Remembrance	Won	
Primetime Emmy Awards	1968	Program of the Year	The Strange Case of Dr. Jekyll and Mr. Hyde	Nominated	
Primetime Emmy Awards	1983	Outstanding Limited Series	The Winds of War	Nominated	
Primetime Emmy Awards	1983	Outstanding Directing for a Limited Series or Movie	The Winds of War	Nominated	
Primetime Emmy Awards	1989	Outstanding Limited Series	War and Remembrance	Won	
Primetime Emmy Awards	1989	Outstanding Directing for a Limited Series or Movie	War and Remembrance	Won	
Saturn Awards	1977	Best Director	Burnt Offerings	Won	
Sitges Film Festival	1977	Best Director	Burnt Offerings	Won	
TCA Awards	1989	Career Achievement Award	—N/a	Nominated	
Western Heritage Awards	1980	Fictional Television Drama	The Last Ride of the Dalton Gang	Won	
