= The Night Stalker (1972 film) =

1972 television horror film by John Llewellyn Moxey

- Barry Atwater as Janos Skorzeny
- Genre: Horror; Mystery
- Based on: The Night Stalker by Jeff Rice
- Teleplay by: Richard Matheson
- Directed by: John Llewellyn Moxey
- Starring: Darren McGavin; Carol Lynley; Simon Oakland; Ralph Meeker; Barry Atwater; Claude Akins; Elisha Cook Jr.
- Music by: Bob Cobert
- Country of origin: United States

Production
- Producer: Dan Curtis
- Cinematography: Michel Hugo
- Editor: Desmond Marquette
- Running time: 74 minutes
- Production companies: ABC Circle Films; Dan Curtis Productions
- Budget: US$450,000 (equivalent to $3,577,445 in 2025)

Original release
- Network: ABC
- Release: January 11, 1972

Related
- The Night Strangler

The Night Stalker is an American made-for-television horror film which aired on ABC on January 11, 1972, as their ABC Movie of the Week. In the film, Carl Kolchak (Darren McGavin), an investigative reporter, comes to suspect that a serial killer in the Las Vegas area is actually a vampire. The Night Stalker set a record for the most viewed made-for-TV film. It was followed by a sequel, The Night Strangler, and a television series, Kolchak: The Night Stalker, both of which had McGavin reprise his role as Carl Kolchak.

== Plot ==
A series of murders plague the Las Vegas Strip. All of the victims had their bodies drained of blood. Carl Kolchak, a veteran reporter who has been fired from newspapers across the country due to his tenacious and unprofessional approach, thinks the killer believes himself to be a vampire. His managing editor, Tony Vincenzo, refuses to run the story under the vampire angle without proof, arguing it could cause a panic and soil the paper's reputation.

When a man attempts to rob a hospital of its blood supply, the police are called in. The thief is shot multiple times without effect, and escapes, outrunning a police car and motorcycle. From eyewitness testimony, the police positively identify the thief as 70-year-old Janos Skorzeny, who is the prime suspect in multiple homicides extending back years, all involving massive loss of blood.

Kolchak's girlfriend, Gail Foster, a casino "change girl", urges him to explore vampire lore. The evidence persuades Kolchak that Skorzeny is a real vampire. Following another failed attempt to capture Skorzeny, the authorities strike a deal with Kolchak to eschew traditional investigative methods for his vampire-centric approach in exchange for giving him exclusive rights to the story. Acting on a tip, Kolchak locates Skorzeny's safe house and pursues the story on his own, wanting unhindered access to the evidence. He photographs stolen blood packets in the refrigerator, a coffin with native soil inside, a victim bound and gagged to a bed with an intravenous line drawing blood, and other incriminating evidence. Compromised when Skorzeny returns, Kolchak is wrestled to the floor. His friend, FBI Agent Bernie Jenks, arrives and joins the fight. Realizing that dawn has broken, Kolchak and Jenks pull back the shades and stake Skorzeny, just as authorities burst through the front door.

Kolchak writes the story for the newspaper and proposes to Gail, telling her that they will move to New York City. The authorities, however, unwilling to publicly admit that Skorzeny was a vampire, print a false version of the newspaper story with his byline and threaten to charge him with first-degree murder unless he quietly leaves Las Vegas. Gail has already been forced to leave the city for being "an undesirable element". Kolchak exhausts his savings placing personal advertisements across the country in a futile attempt to find her.

Kolchak, sitting in a hotel room, listens to a replay of his dictation of the Skorzeny case. He explains that if anyone tries to verify the events, they will find that all witnesses have either left town, are not talking, or are dead. Skorzeny and all his victims have been cremated, destroying any further ability to investigate the matter and eliminating the possibility that those killed by Skorzeny would rise as vampires.

== Cast ==
- Darren McGavin as Carl Kolchak
- Carol Lynley as Gail Foster
- Simon Oakland as Tony Vincenzo
- Ralph Meeker as Bernie Jenks
- Claude Akins as Sheriff Warren A. Butcher
- Charles McGraw as Police Chief Ed Masterson
- Kent Smith as District Attorney Tom Paine
- Elisha Cook Jr. as Mickey Crawford
- Stanley Adams as Fred Hurley
- Larry Linville as Dr. Robert Makurji
- Jordan Rhodes as Dr. John O'Brien
- Barry Atwater as Janos Skorzeny

== Production ==
The film was based on the then-unpublished novel by Jeff Rice titled The Kolchak Papers (a.k.a. The Kolchak Tapes). Rice recounted, "I'd always wanted to write a vampire story, but more because I wanted to write something that involved Las Vegas."

Rice had difficulty finding a publisher willing to buy the manuscript until agent Rick Ray read it and realized the novel would make a good movie. The renamed novel The Night Stalker (1973) was not published until after the TV movie had aired, and was delayed according to Rice because the publisher wanted both Rice's original novel and the sequel The Night Strangler (1974), which was written by Rice but based on the screenplay by author Richard Matheson, so "they could be placed on the top of the publisher's list in the 1 and 2 positions for 1974".

Directed by John Llewellyn Moxey (a veteran of theatrical and television films), who shot the film over 12 days, adapted by Richard Matheson, and produced by Dan Curtis (best known at the time for Dark Shadows), The Night Stalker became the highest-rated original television film on US television, earning a 33.2 rating and 48 share. The television film did so well that it was released overseas as a theatrical film. It inspired a sequel television film titled The Night Strangler, which aired on January 16, 1973, a single-season TV series of twenty episodes titled Kolchak: The Night Stalker that ran on ABC between September 1974 and May 1975, and a short lived 2005 TV series called Night Stalker.

Actor Darren McGavin recalled how his involvement began: "My representatives called to say that ABC had purchased the rights to a book called The Kolchak Papers. They were into a kind of first draft of a script by Richard Matheson, and they called the agency to ask them if I'd be interested in doing it. My representative read it and called me." McGavin came up with the character Carl Kolchak's signature attire of a seersucker suit, a battered straw hat, and sneakers. He said, "I got this image of a New York newspaperman who had been fired in the summer of 1962 when he was wearing a seersucker suit, his straw hat, button-down Brooks Brothers shirt, and reporter's tie and he hasn't bought any clothes since."

The popular television film, along with its sequel and the TV series, was an inspiration for Chris Carter's The X-Files. Carter featured actor Darren McGavin in the show as a tribute to the actor and the project that inspired his popular series. Carter had originally wanted McGavin to play Kolchak, but the actor elected not to, so the role was rewritten, making McGavin's character Arthur Dales, the "father of the X-files".

== Subsequent history ==
The Night Stalker garnered the highest ratings of any TV film at that time (3c3.2 rating – 48 share). That resulted in a 1973 follow-up TV film called The Night Strangler and a planned 1974 film titled The Night Killers, which instead evolved into the 1974–1975 television series Kolchak: The Night Stalker, with McGavin reprising his role in both. An episode of the series titled "The Vampire" was an actual sequel to Stalker, deriving its story from characters introduced in the film. The "undesirable element" is a holdover from the original script where Gail Foster (Carol Lynley) was more clearly implied to be a Las Vegas prostitute with whom Kolchack was romantically involved. Standards and Practices had her changed into a casino employee.

Following the series' cancellation, the franchise was still highly regarded enough to prompt two more TV films, which were created by editing together material from four previous episodes of the series, with some additional narration provided by McGavin as Kolchak to help connect the plot lines. No new footage was included.

Dan Curtis reused footage from The Night Stalker in his 1975 TV film Trilogy of Terror; the drive-in movie Julie Eldridge (Karen Black) and Chad Rogers (Robert Burton) watch, though described as a classic black-and-white film in French with English subtitles, is actually The Night Stalker with the color removed.

On September 29, 2005 ABC aired a remake of the 1974 series Kolchak: The Night Stalker, titled Night Stalker. ABC owned the rights to the original TV films, but not the Universal TV series, and were limited only to using characters that had appeared in the films.

== Home media ==
Released in 1987 on VHS by CBS/Fox Video (Cat.#8017).

The film was released in 2004 by MGM Home Entertainment as a double feature DVD with The Night Strangler. The DVD also has a 21-minute interview with producer and director Dan Curtis divided between each film: 14 minutes of him discussing Stalker, and on the flipside, seven minutes of him discussing Strangler. Both films, issued on October 2, 2018, were released separately on HD Blu-Ray and DVD, featuring new 4K transfers by Kino Lorber, Inc.

== See also ==
- List of American films of 1972
- List of Kolchak:The Night Stalker episodes
- List of films set in Las Vegas
- Crackle of Death (third film created from TV series episodes)
- Vampire films
