= Paul Lohmann =

American cinematographer (1926–1995)

- Born: Paul Fritz Lohmann; 5 February 1926; New York City, New York, US
- Died: 10 December 1995 (aged 69); Los Angeles, California, US
- Occupation: cinematographer

Paul Fritz Lohmann (5 February 1926 – 10 December 1995) was a cinematographer. In 1976, he won an Emmy for Outstanding Achievement in Cinematography for Entertainment Programming for a Special for Eleanor and Franklin, an award he shared with Edward R. Brown.

== Filmography ==
- Coffy (1973)
- California Split (1974)
- Trilogy of Terror (1975)
- Nashville (1975)
- Buffalo Bill and the Indians, or Sitting Bull's History Lesson (1976)
- Silent Movie (1976)
- The White Buffalo (1977)
- High Anxiety (1977)
- Time After Time (1979)
- Mommie Dearest (1981)
- Looker (1981)
- Blow Out (1981)
- Masada (1981)
- Endangered Species (1982)
- The Dollmaker (1984)
- Lust in the Dust (1985)
