= Townsend Harris Hall Prep School =

Former public school in New York City

Townsend Harris Hall School

Location
- 141 Convent Avenue; Manhattan, NY, New York 10031; United States; 40°49′10″N 73°57′00″W

Information
- Type: Public (magnet) secondary
- Established: 1849 (one-year); 1906 (three-year)
- Grades: 9–12 in three years
- Enrollment: 1108
- Colors: Crimson and gold
- Mascot: Hawks
- Newspaper: The Classic; The Phoenix
- Yearbook: The Crimson and Gold

Townsend Harris Hall, later Townsend Harris High School, was a public preparatory school located in Manhattan in New York City that was linked to the City College of New York and that existed from 1906 to 1942 and, in an earlier form, went back to 1849. An elite, all-boys school, it was intended for students who were strong intellectually and who were willing to undertake a strenuous program of studies. One of the school's hallmarks was that it allowed strong students to graduate in three years rather than the usual four. It was one of the earlier selective schools in the country, although the tradition of select exam schools in American cities went back to the colonial-era founding of the Boston Latin School. The alumni of Townsend Harris Hall would be filled with high achievers in a variety of fields – a few of whom include the medical researcher Jonas Salk, the novelist Herman Wouk, the lyricist Ira Gershwin, and the economist Kenneth Arrow – and the school gained a national reputation.

== History ==
=== Sub-Freshman era ===
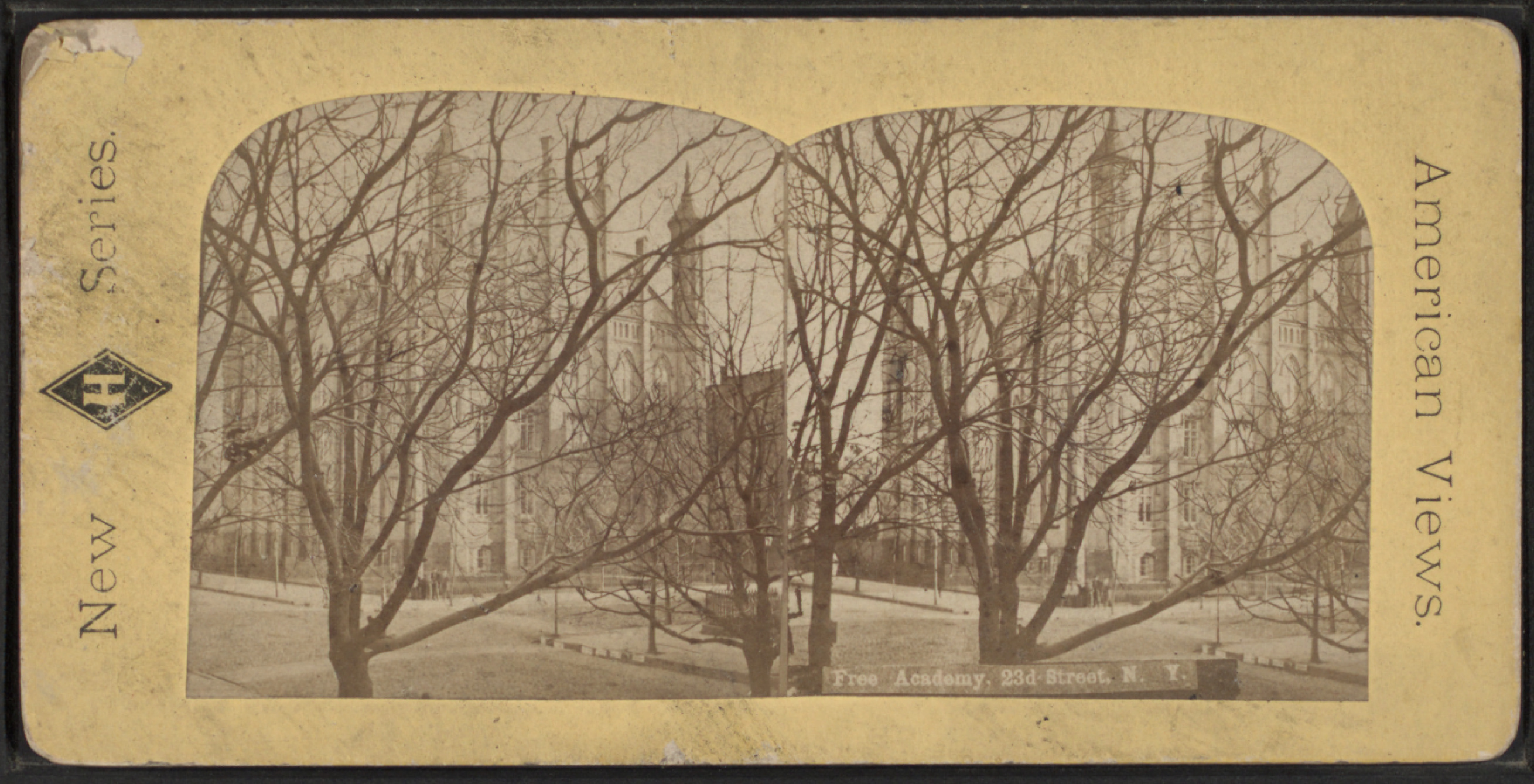
The original, James Renwick Jr.-designed Free Academy building on 23rd Street housed the Sub-Freshman school

The school was named for Townsend Harris who, besides his many diplomatic accomplishments, had helped found the Free Academy of the City of New York, later to become the City College of New York, and who was a strong proponent of free education. The Free Academy was founded in 1847, and then Townsend Harris was formed in 1849 as a one-year preparatory school for the Free Academy.

At this time, the school was referred to as the Sub-Freshman Class, and its purpose was to bring students of differing educational backgrounds to be sufficiently prepared to attend the Free Academy. It was housed within the James Renwick Jr.-designed Free Academy building on East 23rd Street, in the East Side Manhattan neighborhood of Kips Bay. Not all Sub-Freshman students went on to the academy, however, as some were simply seeking to be more equipped to enter the workforce.

During the nineteenth century, the school's students mostly came from prominent, politically conservative classes and ethnic groups within the city.

=== Academic Department era ===
New requirements for pre-collegiate education were put forth by the New York State Board of Regents at the turn of the century, which had in turn been pushed by the educator Nicholas Murray Butler's desire to see standardized secondary education. The school's introductory year evolved into a fully-qualified program during the early- to mid-1900s, during which time the school became referred to as the Academic Department. However, the athletic teams from the school were called C.C.N.Y. Prep. The transition of the school program's length took place over several years, but 1906 is the year most commonly given for the beginning of the resulting three-year school. The expanded school was housed in an annex building across Lexington Avenue from the main City College campus.

The school's demographic composition would change with the large-scale immigration from Eastern Europe and elsewhere around the turn of the century. The Jewish immigrants of the time started finding a place at Townsend Harris, such that by the time the three-year school began in the 1900s, some 75 percent of the student body was Jewish, a figure that would grow to over 90 percent by 1920. There were also some students coming from the immigrant Irish and immigrant Italian communities. Percentages at City College were similar during this time.

Students were typically immigrants themselves, or the children of immigrants. Economically, they were working class.

=== Townsend Harris Hall era ===
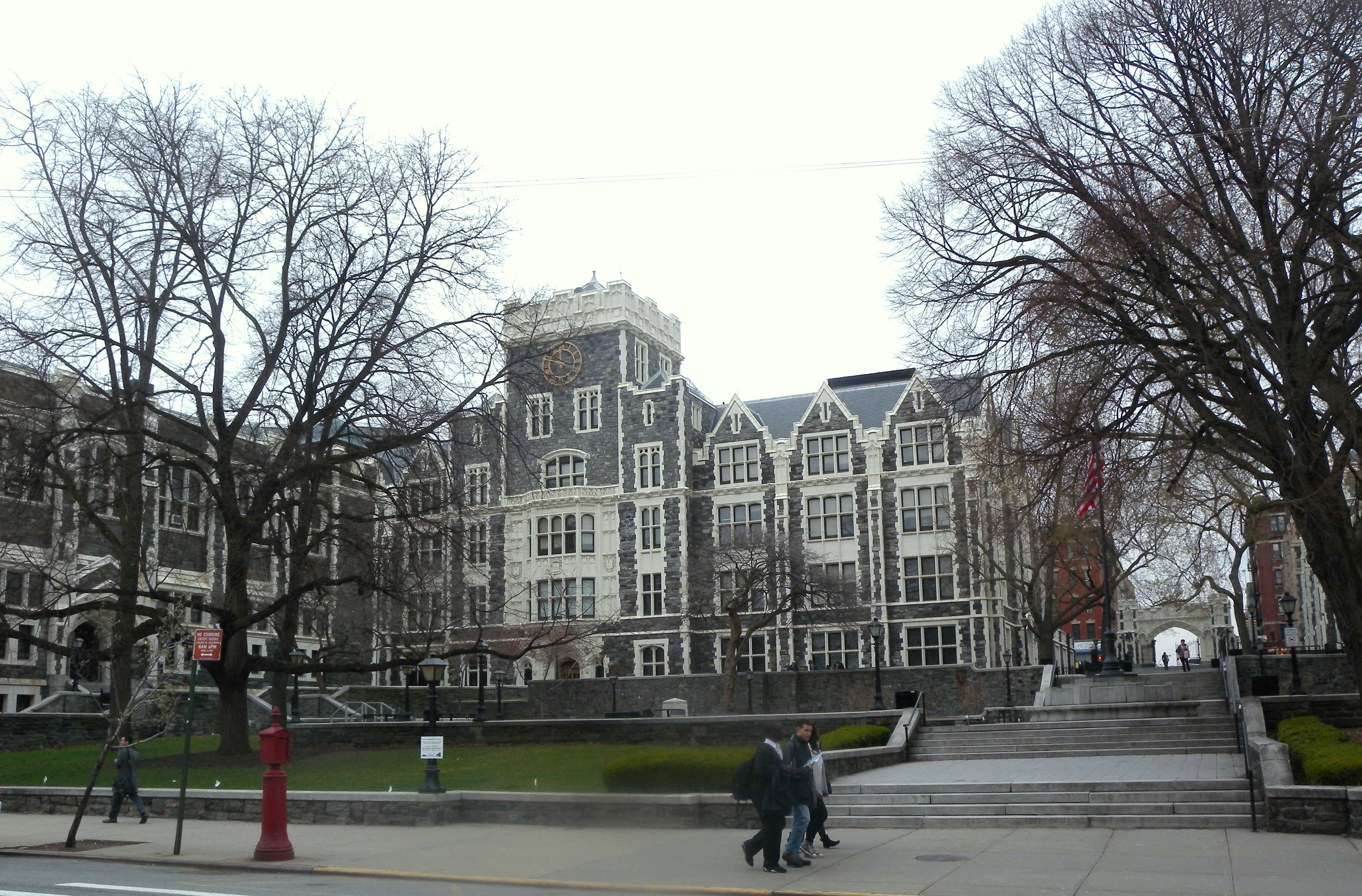
Townsend Harris Hall (center) on the campus of the City College of New York. Designed by George B. Post, the Collegiate Gothic-style building is named for Townsend Harris, the founder of City College. It housed the Townsend Harris preparatory school for many years and is still in use for the CUNY School of Medicine.

City College moved to a new campus built in Hamilton Heights overlooking Harlem in Upper Manhattan, a move completed in 1907. The campus was designed by the architect George B. Post. The Academic Department was one of the first to move, in Fall 1905, to a new building called Townsend Harris Hall, which had been given that name to honor City College's founder.

At the same time, Townsend Harris Hall was also adopted as the name of the school, including in interscholastic sports. The name was carried on by some alumni even after it changed to a later form, in part because the 'Hall' part sounded like that of an English public school.

=== Townsend Harris High School era ===
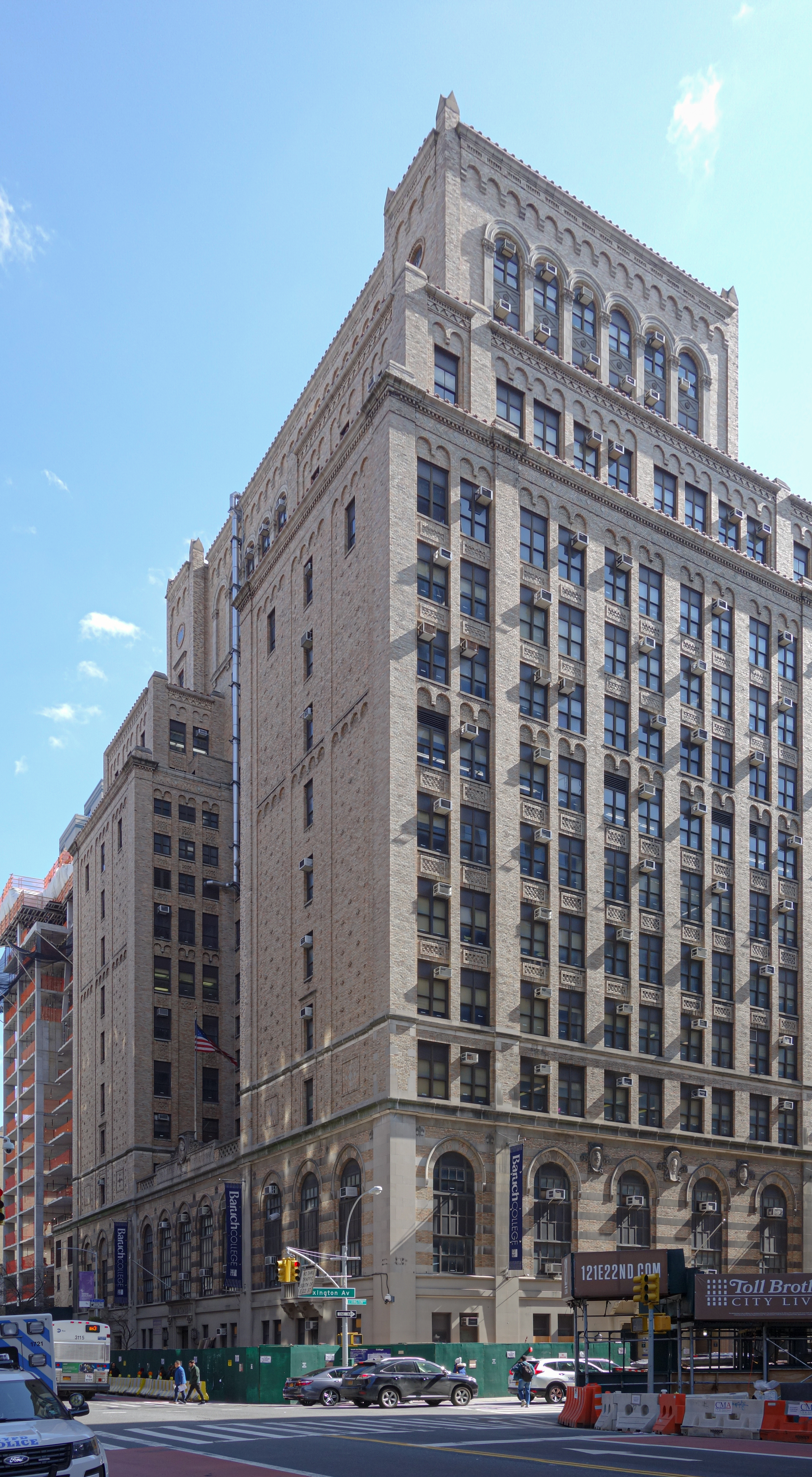
The Townsend Harris school moved in 1930 to several floors of the City College School of Business at 23rd Street; the structure, known as the Lawrence and Eris Field Building, is still in use by CUNY Baruch College.

Despite their record of success, New York's selective examination schools tended to be overcrowded and not especially well-funded. When the Hamilton Heights location became overcrowded in 1930, Townsend Harris moved back to the East 23rd Street site. There it initially occupied the ninth and tenth floors of the City College School of Business, in a new sixteen-story structure that had opened the year before. As such it was one of the few, and perhaps only, high school in New York City without its own building. The physical environment was very different there, with the spaciousness of the uptown collegiate setting replaced by spartan accommodations and the bustle of mid-Manhattan. Later the eleventh and twelfth floors would be used as well.

The association with a namesake building gone, the institution now became known as Townsend Harris High School. The full, official name on the diplomas given to graduating students was: Townsend Harris High School, the Preparatory High School of the College of the City of New York.

== Enrollment ==
As a public school, there was no tuition for parents to pay (nor would there be at City College at the time). Students came from the Lower East Side, as well as the East Bronx and Brownsville, Brooklyn.

Townsend Harris had a large number of Jewish students from Eastern European backgrounds. Those who graduated from Townsend Harris were guaranteed a place at City College. With the Jewish limitation quota in place at many Ivy League institutions, including Harvard University, and those institutions largely filled by the children of affluent Protestants, City College became known as "the poor man's Harvard". Admission to City College was quite competitive (its change to open admissions would not happen until decades later), so gaining entrance to Townsend Harris, with its future of a secured spot at City College, was greatly desired by determined students from immigrant backgrounds.

Most students started at the high school when they were 12 or 13, after having skipped one or more grades along the way, and were ready to graduate by the age of 15 or 16. According to one characterization, the typical student was "intellectually precocious, socially inept". Overall, some three-quarters of Townsend Harris graduates went on to attend City College, which they would also graduate from at a relatively young age.

By 1941, the school had 1,200 students at it.

== Academics ==
The school admitted students by an entrance examination, which was known to be difficult. The other selective exam schools in New York City at the time were Stuyvesant High School (in lower Manhattan) and Brooklyn Technical High School, with the Bronx High School of Science appearing as well late in Townsend Harris's existence. But Townsend Harris was considered the most academically rigorous of any of them, and the most prestigious.

Townsend Harris condensed four years of high school into three. The workload on the students was intense, but the students took pride in how much time they spent on homework and studying. The curriculum at Townsend Harris focused on the humanities, not the sciences; while a course in physics was offered, there was none on biology or chemistry. Some of the teachers at Townsend Harris were professors at City College.

Latin was taught, as well as Greek. In that tradition, students recited the Ephebic oath. And there was a school newspaper put out in Latin.

The faculty of Townsend Harris Hall tended to be conservative and traditional in their pedagogical approach. Nonetheless, some teachers encouraged their students to engage in independent research in their topics. And some of the students who emerged from Townsend Harris later became heavily involved in progressive education. Students would remember Townsend Harris Hall fondly for having installed a beneficial and production way of thinking. One alumnus said decades later, "Almost anyone who attended will tell you that being at Townsend Harris was a turning point – an intellectual awakening."

== Extracurricular activities ==
=== Athletics ===
Townsend Harris competed in the Public Schools Athletic League (PSAL) of New York City. The school colors were crimson and gold. In general, the school was not strong on athletics, due in part to competing requirements on boys' time and due in part to Townsend Harris students being younger and undersized compared to other high schools.

Perhaps the most successful school team was in swimming, winning a PSAL championship in 1907. It won the same championship again in 1920, defeating Manual Training High School in the finals, and, together with Erasmus Hall High School, was at the top of the standings of the dual meet tournament during 1921.

A basketball team also won a PSAL championship in 1907. It would continue to compete in the slow-paced nature of the sport in that era, such as losing a 28–9 contest to De Witt Clinton High School in 1926. Track and field was a somewhat successful sport for the school, and there was also a team fielded in cross country running. and even on occasion gridiron football. Finding enough players to field a baseball team was always a struggle for the school, but they did so some of the time, such as playing Mount St. Michael's High School in 1934.

=== Clubs and organizations ===
Extracurricular activities were under the purview of the General Organization (G.O.). These included student government as well as various clubs. Those clubs included the Current History Society and the Law and Debate Society.

The honor society at the school was part of Arista. Its selection process was opaque, and people surprisingly not admitted included the future medical researcher Jonas Salk, as well as the future writer Herman Wouk and the semi-autobiographical protagonist of his novel Inside, Outside.

Military education began in the form of the Student Army Training Corps during the World War I years, but the existence of loyalty oaths proved controversial. This issue became more pronounced in the 1930s, with faculty members being examined for possible connections to politically radical movements.

A chess team from Townsend Harris played in the Interborough High School Chess League.

== Closing ==
By 1939, there was a proposal in front of the Board of Higher Education of the City of New York to discontinue the Townsend Harris High School, on the grounds that its space was needed by City College and that the other high schools in the city could adequately serve the students. By then, the city was also under budgetary pressures. Some 500 alumni of the school met to protest against the proposal.

That closing did not happen, and by the early 1940s, Townsend Harris continued to excel by its own standards: students were awarded more Regents scholarships than those of any other high school in the city. But critics of the school came to view it as elitist and essentially unnecessary and obsolete. The school's three-year program was also not in conformance with the other city high schools' four-year programs.

In April 1941, Mayor Fiorello La Guardia characterized the school as a "nonessential educational unit" and excluded it from the city budget, a decision agreed to by the Board of Higher Education. Closing the school would allow the city to eliminate the separate funding for 75 teachers and 1,000 students. There was also speculation that the motivation behind the closure was because a relative of Mayor La Guardia was not admitted to the school. The school's students protested the mayor's plan, with 850 of them staging a sit-down strike, followed by 400 parents, alumni, and teachers meeting in objection.

Court cases ensued; rulings from the Supreme Court of the State of New York and the Appellate Division held that the mayor should restore funding for the school, but finally the New York Court of Appeals backed the ability of the Board of Higher Education to close the school.

The school's final graduation was in June 1942. The thousand students were transferred to other city schools, while the seventy-five teachers involved encountered some difficulty in finding new positions. The physical space reverted to City College, and the 23rd Street location is the home of CUNY Baruch College.

Townsend Harris closed with about 10,000 graduates throughout its history.

== Re-creation ==
In 1980, a group of alumni from Townsend Harris Hall, who by then were in their mid-50s or older, took on a mission to reopen the school. In 1984, a school, this time associated with Queens College, City University of New York, was opened and took on the similar name of Townsend Harris High School. The relocation was largely a result of the role that the Queens borough president and the leadership of Queens College played in the initiative succeeding.

Open to girls as well as boys, the school retains much of the humanities focus and classical education elements of the original Townsend Harris. Instead of catering to striving immigrant families from Eastern Europe as the original school did, it caters to similar demographics from Asia and Latin America. It is thus considered to be carrying on the traditions of the original.

In 2000, Eileen F. Lebow published a full-length account of the original institution, The Bright Boys: A History of Townsend Harris High School.

== Notable alumni ==
=== Scholars ===
- Manfred Halpern, political scientist expert in modern Middle East
- Morton Fried, professor of anthropology at Columbia University who made contributions to the fields of social theory and political theory
- Donald M. Friedman was a scholar of English Renaissance literature at the University of California, Berkeley

=== Science and technology ===
- Morton Deutsch (1920–2017), social psychologist who was one of the founding fathers of the field of conflict resolution.
- Theodore Hall ('40), physicist and one of the most infamous atomic spies for the Soviet Union.
- Herbert Hauptman ('33), mathematician who shared the 1985 Nobel Prize for Chemistry for his application of mathematical models to determine crystal structures.
- Robert Jastrow, cosmologist and author who was first director of NASA's Lunar Exploration Committee and the first director of the Goddard Institute for Space Studies.
- Sidney H. Liebson ('35), physicist and inventor of the Halogen Geiger Counter. Developed the first equipment used to detect enemy radar, for which he received a U.S. Navy award.
- William Nierenberg ('35), physicist known for holding several government posts in addition to serving as director of the Scripps Institution of Oceanography and co-founding the George C. Marshall Institute.
- Gilbert Jerome Perlow, physicist who was a pioneer in studies of the Mössbauer effect. He later served as editor of the Journal of Applied Physics.
- Jonas Salk ('31), virologist and medical researcher best known for producing the first safe and effective polio vaccine.
- Julian Schwinger ('33), theoretical physicist who shared the 1965 Nobel Prize in Physics for his work in developing QED theory.

=== Writing and journalism ===
- Robert Bleiberg, former managing editor and publisher of Barron's
- Bennett Cerf (1898–1971), publisher who was one of the founders of American publishing firm Random House.
- Lawrence Cremin ('41), educational historian who received the 1981 Pulitzer Prize for History for American Education: The National Experience, 1783–1876.
- Irwin Edman, professor of philosophy, author, and mentor.
- Paul Goodman ('27)
- Hy Hollinger, editor and journalist covering the entertainment industry, international editor of The Hollywood Reporter (1992–2008).
- John F. Kieran, columnist for The New York Times and panelist on the radio show Information Please
- Sidney Kingsley ('24) was a dramatist (The Patriots, Detective Story, Darkness at Noon). He received the 1934 Pulitzer Prize for Drama, for Men in White.
- Samuel Menashe ('42)
- Irving Singer was a professor of philosophy at MIT.
- Anatole Shub was an author, journalist, editor, and analyst who was an expert on Russian society during the Soviet era.
- William Steig ('22)
- Herman Wouk ('30) was an author (The Winds of War, War and Remembrance). He won the 1952 Pulitzer Prize for Fiction for his novel The Caine Mutiny.

=== Performing arts and entertainment ===
- Mason Adams was an actor best known for the TV series Lou Grant and his voice-over work in animation and commercials.
- Army Archerd ('37) was a columnist and blogger for Variety (1953–2009).
- Bennett Cerf was a publisher and humorist also known for being a panelist on the TV quiz show What's My Line?
- Warren Cowan was a Hollywood publicist, and co-founder of the public relations firm Rogers & Cowan.
- Howard Dietz was a lyricist, best known for his collaborations with composer Arthur Schwartz. Among his songs are "Dancing in the Dark" and "That's Entertainment!".
- Ervin Drake ('35) was a composer and lyricist ("I Believe", "Good Morning Heartache", and "It Was a Very Good Year"). Drake also composed the school's Alma Mater.
- Ira Gershwin was a lyricist, best known for songs written with his brother George Gershwin ("I Got Rhythm", "Embraceable You", and "Someone to Watch Over Me"). He also collaborated on the libretto of Porgy and Bess.
- Yip Harburg was a lyricist known for writing songs such as "Brother, Can You Spare a Dime?", "April in Paris", and "It's Only a Paper Moon". He also wrote all of the songs for The Wizard of Oz, most notably "Over the Rainbow".
- Mark Hellinger (expelled) was a film and stage columnist and film producer.
- Sam Jaffe was an actor known for films like Gunga Din and The Asphalt Jungle and the TV series Ben Casey
- Frank Loesser was an Oscar, Tony, and Pulitzer prize award-winning composer and songwriter best known for Guys and Dolls and How to Succeed in Business Without Really Trying.
- Edward G. Robinson ('10) was an actor known for films like Little Caesar, Double Indemnity, Key Largo and The Ten Commandments.
- Richard Rodgers (attended) was a composer, best known for his work with lyricist Oscar Hammerstein II (Oklahoma!, The King and I, The Sound of Music).
- Charles Strouse ('43) is an Emmy, Grammy, and Tony Award-winning composer and lyricist best known for composing the musicals Bye Bye Birdie and Annie, as well as film scores (Bonnie and Clyde), and the song "Those Were the Days" for the TV series All in the Family.
- Joseph Vogel was a former president of Metro-Goldwyn-Mayer.
- Clifton Webb was a Golden Globe winning actor (The Razor's Edge, Laura, Three Coins in the Fountain).
- Bernie West was a television writer (All in the Family, The Jeffersons)
- Cornel Wilde was a director and actor (The Greatest Show on Earth, A Thousand and One Nights, The Naked Prey).

=== Business, economics, and philanthropy ===
- Kenneth Arrow ('36) was an economist who shared the 1972 Nobel Memorial Prize in Economic Sciences for his work on social choice theory. He proposed his eponymous Arrow's impossibility theorem.
- Eugene Lang ('34) was a philanthropist, associated with Project Pericles, among others. The Eugene Lang College The New School for Liberal Arts is named for him, and he received the Presidential Medal of Freedom in 1996.
- Leon Levy ('39) was a financial analyst and hedge fund pioneer with Oppenheimer & Co. (1951–82). He was a philanthropist, predominantly in education, art, and archaeology.
- Alexander Sachs was a banker and economist, best known for delivering the Einstein–Szilárd letter to Franklin Roosevelt, and convincing him to begin research into the construction of a nuclear weapon.
- Bernard L. Schwartz (ca. 1936) businessman and Democratic donor activist.
- George Weissman was a businessman and philanthropist who served as president of Phillip Morris USA.

=== Law, politics, and activism ===
- Felix S. Cohen was a lawyer, legal scholar, and activist who specialized in federal law as it related to Native Americans.
- Herbert Feis was the Advisor on International Economic Affairs in the US State Department during the Franklin Roosevelt Administration. Subsequently, he wrote 13 books on the diplomatic history of World War II, including Between War and Peace: The Potsdam Conference, which won a Pulitzer Prize.
- Joseph H. Flom was an American lawyer and last surviving named founder of Skadden, Arps, Slate, Meagher & Flom
- Felix Frankfurter was an Associate Justice of the Supreme Court of the United States (1939–62).
- Rudolph Halley was an attorney who worked on both the Truman Committee (investigating defense spending waste) and Kefauver Committee (investigating organized crime). He served as President of the New York City Council (1951–53).
- James Male was a lawyer and member of the New York State Assembly.
- Robert N.C. Nix Sr. was a United States Congressman (1958–79). He was the first African-American Congressman elected from Pennsylvania.
- Maurice Paprin '36 A prominent NYC real estate developer who got his start in the business building multi-family apartment buildings in the Borough of Queens. He was a leading figure during President Johnson's Great Society Program and was responsible for bringing to market thousands of high quality affordable housing units in NYC. Most notable among them was the creation of the Schomburg Plaza Apartment Houses on 110th St. & Fifth Ave in Manhattan.
- Adam Clayton Powell Jr. was a United States Congressman (1945–71). He was the first person of African-American descent elected to Congress from New York.
- Igal Roodenko was a printer, a radical pacifist, a member of the executive committee of the War Resisters League from 1944 through 1977, and its director from 1968 through 1972.
- Robert Wagner was a U.S. Senator from New York (1927–49). He was responsible for proposing many pieces of New Deal legislation, and several important bills from that era bear his name.
- Sol Ullman was a lawyer, New York State Assemblyman, and assistant attorney general.
- William A. Zeck, a retired New York State judge and political official who was a prosecutor at the Nuremberg war-crimes trials

=== Sports ===
- James Reilly was a member of the United States swimming team in the 1912 Summer Olympics and was later the head coach of the Rutgers University swimming team.

== Cited bibliography ==
- Ferris, Marc (1995). "Townsend Harris High School". In Jackson, Kenneth T. (ed.). The Encyclopedia of New York City. New Haven, Connecticut: Yale University Press. pp. 228–229. ISBN 0-300-05536-6.
- Finn, Chester E., Jr.; Hockett, Jessica A. (2012). Exam Schools: Inside America's Most Selective Public High Schools. Princeton, New Jersey: Princeton University Press. ISBN 978-1-4008-4457-9. Excerpted in "Why some schools rocket to the top". New York Post. September 9, 2012.
- Jacobs, Charlotte DeCroes (2015). Jonas Salk: A Life. New York, NY: Oxford University Press. ISBN 978-0-19-933443-8.
- Krasner, Jonathan B. (2012). The Benderly Boys and American Jewish Education. Lebanon, New Hampshire: University Press of New England. ISBN 978-1-61168-293-9.
- Lebow, Eileen F. (2000). The Bright Boys: A History of Townsend Harris High School. Contributions to the Study of Education. Westport, CN: Greenwood Press. ISBN 0-313-31479-9.
- Roff, Sandra Shoiock; Cucchiara, Anthony M.; Dunlap, Barbara J. (2000). From the Free Academy to CUNY: Illustrating Public Higher Education in New York City, 1847–1997. New York: Fordham University Press. ISBN 0-8232-2019-2.
- Shor, Rachel (1995). "Townsend Harris High School". In Jackson, Kenneth T. (ed.). The Encyclopedia of New York City. New Haven, Connecticut: Yale University Press. p. 1194. ISBN 0-300-05536-6.
- Terzian, Sevan G. (2002). "Review: [Untitled]". History of Education Quarterly. 42 (3): 434–436. doi:10.1017/S0018268000025668. JSTOR 3217984.
- Wooldridge, Adrian (2021). The Aristocracy of Talent: How Meritocracy Made the Modern World. Simon and Schuster. ISBN 978-1-5107-6862-8.
