= Sailor and Fiddler =

2015 memoir by Herman Wouk

- Author: Herman Wouk
- Publisher: Simon & Schuster
- Publication date: 2015

Herman Wouk: Among [my classmates] I was a Bronx nobody, a fat short baby-faced classroom clown. Depicted in fiction fifty years later, my teenage ordeals and disasters may be amusing, but I am not revisiting them now, thank you, for love or money.

Sailor and Fiddler: Reflections of a 100-Year-Old Author is a 2015 memoir by Herman Wouk (1915 – 2019). It is his last book and he was 100 years old when it was published by Simon & Schuster.

The title refers to his time is the U.S Navy and his Jewish faith, by alluding to Fiddler on the Roof. He had considered a memoir project as early as the 1980s, but his wife had told him "you're not that interesting a person."

At under 140 pages, the book is short on detail, and Wouk states that much of his life has gone into his fiction. He writes of his time as a gagman for comedian Fred Allen, and his time in the navy. He describes the novels The Winds of War and War and Remembrance as his "main task" in life, and talks of his strong convictions on his religion and heritage.

Wouk also mentions that he has been writing diaries since the 1930s, and that they may one day be published in some form.
