= Lawgiver =

Lawgiver may refer to:

- A person who draws up, introduces, or enacts a code of laws for a nation or people, such as:
  - Culture hero, a type of mythological figure
  - Legislator, a person who writes and passes laws
- The Lawgiver, a 2012 novel relating to Moses, by Herman Wouk.
- Lawgiver (Judge Dredd), a fictional gun from the Judge Dredd comics and films
- The Lawgiver, a Planet of the Apes character

== See also ==
- Great man theory
- Draco (lawgiver)
- Lycurgus of Sparta
- Numa Pompilius
- Moses
