= Marjorie Morningstar =

Marjorie Morningstar is a fictional character created by American writer Herman Wouk and can refer to:

- Marjorie Morningstar (novel), a 1955 novel, which introduced the character
- Marjorie Morningstar (film), a 1958 film, based on the novel
