= Youngblood Hawke (disambiguation) =

Youngblood Hawke is an American novel by Herman Wouk. It may also refer to:

- Youngblood Hawke (film), based on the novel
- Youngblood Hawke (band), an American indie pop band
  - Youngblood Hawke, their 2012 self-titled EP
