= Patron the DepthMC =

American rapper

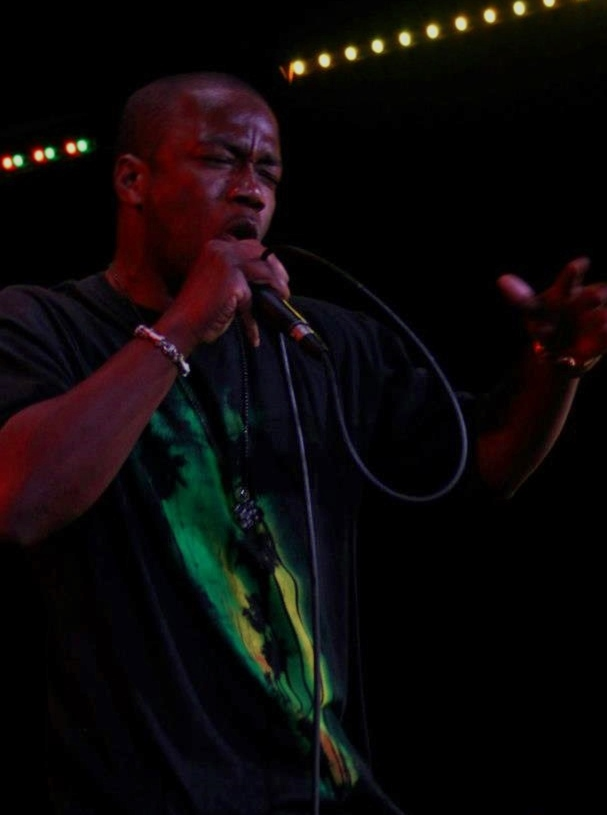
- Patron the DepthMC performing live at Whiskey a Go Go

Background information
- Also known as: Olo Kamen
- Born: Norristown, Pennsylvania
- Origin: Baltimore, Maryland
- Genres: Hip hop, Pop
- Occupations: Screenwriter, rapper, singer-songwriter, pianist
- Instruments: Vocal, piano, saxophone, guitar
- Years active: 2000–2015
- Labels: High Horse Records, Interscope records, L.N.C. Music Records
- Website: www.olokamen.com

Patron the DepthMC also known as Olo Kamen, is an American screenwriter, author, hip hop recording artist, rapper, singer-songwriter and self-taught pianist originally from Baltimore, Maryland living in Los Angeles, California. His debut album, With Character, was released in 2012 under Interscope Records. He produced, made the beats, and played all the instruments on the album. He ended his musical career in 2015 to fully focus on writing. In 2015 he wrote the TV series "The New World" which has been converted to the book version. The Part I. Johnny B. Goode of the book is in the process of being prepared for publication. He is currently developing his TV Series "Beautiful Scars" with Sony Pictures Television.

== Life and career ==
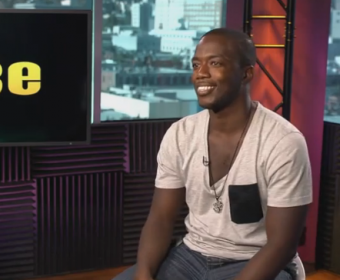
PDMC – interviewing at VIBE

Patron the DepthMC was born in Norristown, Pennsylvania. His parents are both from Jamaica. Patron the DepthMC went to 13 different schools before going to college. His family was moving between Florida and Maryland until Baltimore became eventually his hometown. While in high school he started running high hurdles and in his 2nd year he started to work in research as an intern for Johns Hopkins Hospital. He began playing the saxophone at the age of sixteen after he heard album "Breathless" from Kenny G. Coming from a religious family any kind of music besides what could be played in church was prohibited in his house growing up. Based on his ability to run he received a scholarship from Columbia Union College where he began Pre-Med studies planning to become a heart surgeon. As a self-taught pianist within 6 months of starting to play he was performing in front of audiences of five thousand. After 3 semesters he moved to UMBC (University of Maryland, Baltimore County). After his 3rd semester he left UMBC and he moved to Los Angeles, California where he was working three shifts to keep a roof over his head. Three years he was living unsecured and at times homeless and played piano on the third promenade in Santa Monica and Venice Beach. There was no success coming until he wrote a song "The Glory" for Olympic programming, published by RIM music group. He released two solo piano albums which took him for tours around the world and got him a record deal with High horse Records. He played in many different venues throughout Japan and Europe. Later on he started to compose original beats which were mixed with his piano. He produced and mixed them himself. He scored several commercials in Europe which brought him to a publishing deal with WAP Publishing based in London, England.

=== 2012– With Character ===
In 2012, he released his first hip hop album, With Character distributed by Interscope Records. The release resulted in international performances and several television appearances in Europe. He also appeared on the mixtapes "The Formula" and "Power of Mixtape". There were two officially released singles from this album "She Said No" and "Obama We Can Stand Together". "Obama We Can Stand Together" was made in support of Barack Obama's presidency and all proceeds from the single were donated to Barack Obama's 2012 campaign.

=== 2013 – L.N.C. Part I. and L.N.C. Part II. ===
Patron the DepthMC started his own label L.N.C. Music LLC. Between his first and most recent album he created a song "One Deep" that was nominated for best single at the Independent hip hop music awards and "Socrates Plagiarized a Pharaoh" that was available for free download during black history month. He worked with producer "Jahbez" on Part 1 of his second album also utilizing beats from "Freak". His follow-up album L.N.C. Part II. was released on September 11, 2013. He released a single "Don't Stop Now" on August 30 that year. He appeared on Vibe TV where he also gave a video interview for Vibe.

== Discography ==
=== EP ===
- MUSED

=== Albums ===
- With Character
- L.N.C. Part I.
- L.N.C. Part II.

=== Singles ===
- "Do You Believe"
- "Heartbeat"
- "Don't Stop Now"
- "She Said No"
- "Obama We Can Stand Together" featuring Stefni Valencia
- "Come Real"

=== Mix tapes ===
- "Dj Gates – Power of Mixtape"
- "Dj Gates – The Formula"

== Other sources ==
- Moe Reed (August 28, 2013). "From MD to MC". Vibe (magazine).
- Rar (September 17, 2013). "Oh-Oh, Hip-Hop may be growing a brain". Rarwriter.com.
- "From MD to MC".
- "World news/article".
- "Patron the DepthMC – Obama We Can Stand Together". YouTube.
