= Herman Wouk Is Still Alive =

Short story by Stephen King

- Short story by Stephen King
- Country: United States
- Language: English
- Genre: Horror short story

Publication
- Published in: The Atlantic
- Publisher: Atlantic Media Company
- Media type: Print
- Publication date: 2011

Chronology
A Good Marriage	Under the Weather

"Herman Wouk Is Still Alive" is a short story by American author Stephen King. It was originally published in the May 2011 issue of The Atlantic magazine.

== Synopsis ==
Old friends Brenda and Jasmine, along with their seven children between them, set off on a road trip in a rented Chevy Express after Brenda wins $2,700 (equivalent to $4,000 in 2025) on the Pick-3 lottery. They reflect back on their harsh childhoods and disappointing lives. Meanwhile, Phil and Pauline, two aging poets and former lovers, are on their way to a poetry festival at the University of Maine. They stop at a rest area to have lunch together. Soon, Brenda decides that their lives are no longer worth living and that the children are doomed to a pitiful future. Deliberately and with the consent and encouragement of Jasmine, she crashes the van into a tree near Phil and Pauline at high speed. Phil and Pauline hurry to the wreckage, but Brenda, Jasmine, and all their children are dead. When a passer-by asks Pauline what happened, she finally loses her well-cultured disposition and asks him "What the fuck does it look like?"

== Publication ==
"Herman Wouk Is Still Alive" came about as part of a bet between King and his son Owen during the NCAA Division I men's basketball tournament in which the loser would have to write a story based on a title supplied by the winner. Owen King came up with the title after reading in an article that Herman Wouk was still alive and writing despite being in his mid-nineties (he would die in 2019 aged 103). King conceived of the story after reading about the 2009 Taconic State Parkway crash.

"Herman Wouk Is Still Alive" was first published in The Atlantic in May 2011. It was collected as part of the 2015 work The Bazaar of Bad Dreams.

== Reception ==
Rocky Wood described "Herman Wouk Is Still Alive" as "King showing once again what a clear eye he has for observing society" and "another mainstream story that illustrates the horror that lurks in real life." Tim Lepczyk described it as "an enjoyable and saddening story." Herman Wouk himself was asked about the short story in a questions and answers session published as part of his 2012 novel The Lawgiver; Wouk stated "I read Mr. King's short story and enjoyed it." The story won the 2011 Bram Stoker Award for Short Fiction.

== See also ==
- 2009 Taconic State Parkway crash
- Stephen King short fiction bibliography
