= City Boy: The Adventures of Herbie Bookbinder =

1948 novel by Herman Wouk

City Boy
- First edition
- Author: Herman Wouk
- Cover artist: H. Lawrence Hoffman
- Language: English
- Publisher: Simon & Schuster
- Publication date: 1948
- Publication place: United States
- Media type: Print (hardback and paperback)
- Pages: 317 (1969 Hardback edition)
- ISBN: 0-316-95511-6 (1992 Paperback edition)
- OCLC: 25509067
- Dewey Decimal: 813/.54 20
- LC Class: PS3545.O98 C5 1992
- Preceded by: Aurora Dawn
- Followed by: The Caine Mutiny

City Boy: The Adventures of Herbie Bookbinder is a 1948 novel by Herman Wouk first published by Simon & Schuster. The second novel written by Wouk, City Boy was largely ignored by the reading public until the success of The Caine Mutiny resurrected interest in Wouk's writing. Like The Caine Mutiny, the novel is semi-autobiographical in setting and situations, if not protagonist. In 1969, the novel was re-issued, with paperback editions in 1980 and 1992, and according to Wouk was translated into 11 languages. John P. Marquand, in a preface to the 1969 20th-anniversary release, likened Herbie Bookbinder to a city-dwelling Huckleberry Finn or Tom Sawyer.

In many of his novels Wouk evinces through his characters a love of Dickens, particularly in use of language to set mood. In City Boy he devises humorous twists of language to set a less-than-serious tone throughout this coming-of-age story. Also like Dickens, Wouk manages a large cast of characters, including more than a dozen adults (and a one-of-a-kind horse named Clever Sam) woven in-and-out of a narrative about children, with depictions that ring true both in description and actions.

== Plot ==
Set in the spring and summer of 1928, City Boy spins the tale of an 11-year-old Jewish boy from the Bronx, New York. The novel first follows Herbert Bookbinder through the final days of school at New York Public School 50, and then through a summer spent at Camp Manitou, a summer camp in the Berkshire Mountains operated by his school's principal. Herbie's city world is one of endless daydreams and small urban pleasures: playing in empty lots, going to the movies on Saturday, arguing with friends around a forbidden campfire, feasting on "fraps" (in this context, a fancy sundae) in Mr. Borowsky's candy store, and going out to dinner at Golden's Restaurant with his dad and his dad's business partners.

Herbie is an exceptionally bright but fat little boy, a seventh grader and a star pupil. Although a poor athlete, Herbie yearns to be a "regular guy" among his schoolboy peers and constantly struggles against the consequences of his own quick wit and natural clumsiness with his rival, Lennie Krieger, the son of the business partner of Herbie's father, Jacob Bookbinder. Both blessed and cursed with a highly-active imagination, Herbie is also on the verge of adolescence, and the story revolves around his continuing quest to win the heart of the fickle, red-haired Lucille Glass.

Herbie, his parents, and his thirteen-year-old sister, Felicia, dwell in an aging Homer Avenue apartment house. Jacob Bookbinder is founder and part owner of an industrial ice-making plant, known to Herbie and his cousin Cliff Block as The Place, a location that plays both a significant role in Herbie's fate and an adult sub-plot that frames the climax of the story.

Herbie contrives to have himself (and his sister, his cousin Cliff Block, and his rival Lennie) sent to Camp Manitou (run by Mr. Gauss, the principal of P.S. 50, as a source of summer income) when he learns that Lucille Glass will be there. The second half of the novel skewers the summer camp scene of the 1920s even as it sets up a succession of abject failures and spectacular successes for Herbie.

Herbie and Cliff contrive to burglarize The Place to finance a well-intended camp project, and this crime is the device by which all the subplots come together in Dickensian fashion.

== Characters ==
=== Students and teachers at P.S. 50 ===
- Herbert Bookbinder (Herbie) - the novel's protagonist, a "stout little dark-haired" eleven-year-old boy living in the Bronx, the star pupil of class 7B-1 at P.S. 50. He is head monitor of school's Social Service Squad (a.k.a. the "garbage gang"). A bright and clever boy but poor athlete, Herbie is forever trying to become a "regular guy," but usually failing. Even his occasional victories are tainted, as when one success results in his forever being dubbed "General Garbage." While having a general scorn for all girls, he nevertheless often becomes a victim of a spell for one particular "sublime creature." It is in pursuit of impressing one such girl that Herbie's adventures and downfall ensue.
- Leonard Krieger (Lennie) - the son of Mr. Bookbinder's partner in the ice business, and Herbie's natural rival. Self-centered, he is everything Herbie is not: big, good-looking, a natural leader, and a good athlete. He hates school and his natural antipathy to Herbie reaches a peak when Herbie, although almost two years younger, is in the same class.
- Mrs. Mortimer Gorkin - newlywed teacher of class 7B-1, Mrs. Gorkin (formerly Diana Vernon) is a pretty redhead in her late twenties, strict, high-strung, and with theatrical aspirations. Herbie is first on the honor roll in her class and until her change of marital status, her pet. She was the first adult female to inspire Herbie's devotion, which her new marriage abruptly ended, leaving the "position" vacant.
- Lucille Glass - 11-year-old daughter of the attorney representing the ice plant run by Herbie's father, Lucille is small, pretty, but very fickle, with red curly hair and large hazel eyes, a grade lower and on the more prestigious Police Squad. While still melancholy from the "loss" of Mrs. Gorkin, Herbie meets Lucille in the hallway while in his role as a head monitor and is immediately dazzled. When Herbie learns that she is attending Camp Manitou, the summer camp operated by the school's principal, he contrives to attend the same camp.
- Julius Gauss (Uncle Gussie) - the principal of P.S. 50. During the summer, he supplements his income by operating Camp Manitou in the Berkshire Mountains. Corpulently roly-poly with a red shiny face, Herbie schemes to go to his camp, but in making his sales pitch to the boy's parents, Gauss's esteem plummets in Herbie's eyes from fearsome giant of authority to that of a "needy relative." Mr. Gauss speaks in platitudes, is ever protective of his dignity, and is parsimonious to a fault.
- Felicia Bookbinder (Fleece) - Herbie's pretty 13-year-old sister. She resents Lucille Glass for being "a baby" but having the same social privileges, and has long had a crush on Lennie Krieger, who rarely notices her except when it humors him to do so.
- Clifford Block (Cliff) - Herbie's cousin. Cliff is large and stolid but good-natured, slow-witted but with common sense. He is protective of his smaller cousin and tolerant of Herbie's air of intellectual superiority. Cliff has an affinity for animals and is totally without the cruelty that often shows itself in other children. He makes himself a willing companion for Herbie's schemes.

=== Adults ===
- Jacob Bookbinder - Herbie's father is a thin, stern former immigrant who operates the Bronx River Ice Company, known to the family as "The Place". Jacob Bookbinder is the disciplinarian in the Bookbinder household and Herbie is frequently the target of his corrections. His father is absorbed by his business's financial problems, but his devotion to his family is apparent. Mr. Bookbinder tries to teach his children honesty and thrift, and although Herbie is unaware of it much of the time, is the key influence on his son's growth.
- Louis Glass - a lawyer involved in the pending takeover of Bronx River Ice Company by Bob Powers. He is Lucille Glass's father.
- Mrs. Bookbinder -- the loving but perhaps overprotective mother of Herbie and Felicia.
- Mr. Krieger - Jacob Bookbinder's business partner and Lennie's father, Mr. Krieger is a tall, timid, and overly insecure man. Following the last and loudest voice he hears, Mr. Krieger tries to protect himself by a strange manner of speaking in which he habitually omits words and never utters a complete sentence.
- Robert Powers - Powers is a "burly, sandy-haired young man" and the ostensible majority owner of the Bronx River Ice Company, having inherited it from his father, the original mortgagee of the company. Powers, unlike his father, is uninterested in the business except as a constant and diminishing source of revenue for his gambling and drinking habits. Needing a substantial amount of cash, he now wants to sell off the plant from under Bookbinder and Krieger to a larger company.
- Henry Junius Drabkind - Mr. Drabkind is an emaciated old man, with a small pink face, long pointed nose, and spectacles. Initially appearing to Herbie and Cliff as an apparent savior, in Dickensian fashion Mr. Drabkind in his role as representative of the Berkshire Free Camp Fund becomes the vessel of Herbie's doom.

=== Campers at Camp Manitou ===
- Uncle Sid - Uncle Sid is a "dumpy, middle-aged" high school teacher who reluctantly earns extra money supervising campers. He is counselor for Herbie's Bunk Thirteen.
- Uncle Sandy - Harried head counselor of the boy's camp at Manitou, Uncle Sandy is a medical student, a big man with thick glasses. He has a well-developed sense of fair play but is also protective of his authority among the other counselors.
- Ted Kahn - Ted is a sullen, hawk-faced, blond 15-year-old. Made captain of Bunk Thirteen, Ted has been consigned to Manitou by his vacationing parents every summer for five years. He pushes his defiance and disdain for Manitou's rules to the limits, but takes a liking to Herbie and does not kowtow to Lennie.
- Yishy Gabelson - an exceptionally tall senior camper at Manitou who, due to his prediliction for blueberries, comes down with a case of poison ivy severe enough to prevent him from participating in the annual rivalry with Camp Penobscot, to the chagrin of the entire camp, thus paving the way for Lennie to shine once more as an athlete. At the end of the camping season he strikes up a romantic relationship with Felicia.
- Raymond "Daisy" Gloster - Unpopular rich kid. He refuses to let anyone read his Tarzan book so Herbie borrows it without permission while everyone is at a dance. Daisy is momentarily popular when he gives away the sausages he receives in a package from home.
- Aunt Tillie - Head counselor for the girls' camp, reviled for her romantic leaning toward one of the rival Camp Penobscot counselors.
- Elmer Bean - Camp Manitou's handyman and an ex-sailor, who becomes a mentor of sorts for Herbie and Cliff. He helps Herbie build his ride.
- Clever Sam - An ancient, intractable, uncooperative horse that Mr. Gauss acquires for five dollars, the symbol of Mr. Gauss' cheapness. Sam at first refuses to be ridden by anyone but Cliff, who persuades the horse to give him his trust. Clever Sam reluctantly provides the transportation of Herbie and Cliff out to the highway on their nighttime journey to The Place.

== Quotes ==
"The small stout boy reviewed several incidents of the day in his mind: concrete against his nose, jeers at his black felt beard, 'General Garbage,' and the recent threat to render his face concave."

"It has gone down among the teachers of P.S.50 as one of the great unsolved crimes of pupil cunning. Strange! Teachers set themselves up to be wondrous wise—yet to this day it has not occurred to one of them that 'outfielder' is a dactyl."

"Like a sailor embarked in a hell ship, like a policeman assigned to a tunnel, like a priest sent to a squalid settlement in the fever belt of India, Herbie Bookbinder was committed beyond hope of release to a summer in Bunk Thirteen."

"After a short silence, conversation was resumed on other topics. Herbie was noticeably shouldered out of the talk. He had committed that breach of manners, unforgivable among adults as well as among boys: he had known more than the leader."

"Nobody, least of all Herbie, overlooked the significance of his given name repeated twice by the captain. It fell sweetly on the fat boy's ears. The speaking of a name can be the conferring of an award above gold medals. Herbie missed the fireworks, but he never regretted them. From that day he was 'Herbie' to all the boys in his bunk except Lennie. Outside the bunk, however, Herbie's designation was fixed. First impressions are hard to change. He had been publicly pilloried on the train as General Garbage, and General Garbage he remained all summer. And if at the age of seventy he should run into a seventy-one year old gaffer formerly of Bunk Thirteen, he should be remembered, if at all, as General Garbage."

"A lonesome, quiet situation, you might say, yet he had plenty of company. Misery sat at the fat boy's right hand, and Shame at the left; and they made the morning mighty lively for Herbie between them."

== Adaptations ==
The film rights to City Boy were purchased by Columbia Pictures "for a small payment" under the working title The Romantic Age. It became the 1951 film Her First Romance, with the character of Herbie Bookbinder changed into a non-Jewish teenaged girl played by Margaret O'Brien (with a brother named Herbie), but the plot elements largely remained the same.

== Title variations ==
There has been some confusion regarding the title of the book. The first edition of the book had the title listed as The City Boy on the title page, with the subtitle: The Adventures of Herbie Bookbinder and His Cousin, Cliff. When the 20th anniversary edition was issued (which was issued 21 years after the original publication date), the title was shortened to City Boy: The Adventures of Herbie Bookbinder. The first edition of The Caine Mutiny used City Boy on the back flap of the dust jacket, but The City Boy on the back panel of the dust jacket. The back panel was shortened to City Boy in subsequent printings.
