= This Is My God =

1959 book by Herman Wouk

First edition (publ. Doubleday)

This is My God is a non-fiction book by Herman Wouk, first published in 1959. The book summarizes many key aspects of Judaism and is intended for both Jewish and non-Jewish audiences. The author, who served in the United States Navy and was a Pulitzer Prize–winning novelist, writes from a Modern Orthodox perspective.

== Key topics ==
- Jewish history
- Shabbat
- High Holy Days
- Minor Holy Days (9th of Av, Purim, Hanukkah)
- Jewish prayer
- Kashrut (dietary laws)
- Torah
- Talmud
- Orthodox Judaism
- Reform Judaism
- Israel
- Zionism. This is My God, page 264, first edition (1959), published by Doubleday, Garden City.

== Additional source ==
- This is my God (1988) by Herman Wouk. ISBN 0-316-95507-8 (This edition is published by Little, Brown, and Company.)
