= The Hope (novel) =

1993 historical novel by Herman Wouk

- First edition cover
- Author: Herman Wouk
- Publisher: Little, Brown & Co.
- Publication date: December 1, 1993
- Pages: 688
- ISBN: 0-316-95441-1

The Hope is a 1993 historical novel by American writer Herman Wouk about pivotal events in the history of the State of Israel from 1948 to 1967. These include the 1948 Arab–Israeli War, the 1956 Sinai War (known in Israel as "Operation Kadesh"), and the Six-Day War. The narrative is continued in the sequel The Glory.

== Plot summary ==
These crucial events are mainly seen through the eyes of two fictional characters, who meet near the beginning of the novel: Zev Barak and Joseph Blumenthal (nicknamed "Don Kishote"). Wouk portrays several real-life Israeli leaders: David Ben-Gurion, Moshe Dayan, Golda Meir, Mickey Marcus, Yigael Yadin, Ariel Sharon, Motta Gur, and others. Both the real and fictional characters are portrayed as brave and decent human beings with character flaws, who manage to lead Israel through three major wars in spite of the nation being surrounded, outgunned, and torn by internal conflicts as well as external threats.

Zev is a junior officer in the unsuccessful attacks on Latrun. Joseph Blumenthal, newly arrived in Israel, joins a new Israeli unit of troops who bravely attack. He acquires the nickname "Don Kishote" when teased about riding a mule wearing an old helmet ("Don Kishote" is Don Quixote in Hebrew). Both Zev and Kishote choose to stay in the Israeli army when the 1948 Arab–Israeli War ends.

The two accompany reporters with the first convoy taking supplies to Jerusalem up the Burma Road bypassing Latrun. Zev visits the US as part of the Israeli delegation to Mickey Marcus's funeral at West Point, there he meets Christian Cunningham, a CIA analyst sympathetic to Israel throughout the story, and his daughter Emily, who eventually becomes Zev's mistress.

Don Kishote is in love with Shayna Matisdorf, but has a brief sexual encounter with Yael Luria on a trip to Paris just before the 1956 Suez war. He returns to Israel and is part of the paratroop force invading Egypt in Operation Kadesh. Zev commands an effort to transport landing craft overland from Haifa to Eilat to supply Israeli units advancing on Sharm el-Sheik.

When Yael tells Kishote she became pregnant during their encounter in Paris, he marries her because he feels the child needs a father, even though he is still in love with Shayna Matisdorf.

Kishote supervises the paratroop training of several African officers, including Idi Amin. Idi Amin is portrayed as lacking the courage to jump out of an airplane, and Kishote arranges a fake jump so Amin qualifies for paratroop wings.

Zev is sent on several diplomatic trips to the United States, and he and Emily Cunningham become lovers the day of President Kennedy's assassination. In 1967, he is the Israeli military attache in Washington, and during the Six-Day War conveys to the Israeli government a message from Christian Cunningham that the U.S. government would not oppose Israel conquering the Golan Heights, even though it will not publicly say so. Zev's wife Nakhama tells Emily Cunningham she knows of their affair and accepts it, but Emily is unable to continue the affair knowing that Nakhama knows about it.

In the Six-Day War, Kishote is wounded in the Sinai campaign, then leaves his hospital near Jerusalem to take part in capturing the Old City of Jerusalem.

== Publication details ==
- The Hope (1993) by Herman Wouk, ISBN 0-316-95519-1
