= A Hole in Texas =

Novel by Herman Wouk

- First edition
- Author: Herman Wouk
- Language: English
- Publisher: Little, Brown and Company
- Publication date: April 14, 2004
- Publication place: United States
- Media type: Print (hardcover)
- Pages: 288 pages
- ISBN: 0-316-52590-1
- OCLC: 53019565
- Dewey Decimal: 813/.54 22
- LC Class: PS3545.O98 H65 2004

A Hole In Texas is a novel by Herman Wouk. Published in 2004, the book describes the adventures of a high-energy physicist following the surprise announcement that a Chinese physicist (with whom he had a long-ago romance) had discovered the long-sought Higgs boson.

Parts of the plot are based on the aborted Superconducting Super Collider project.

Published by Little, Brown and Company, ISBN 0-316-52590-1.

== Literary significance and reception ==
Kirkus Reviews said that A Hole In Texas was "Ingenious. Absolutely ingenious." Publishers Weekly called it "Occasionally corny but also playful, thoughtful and passionate". The journal Science said that Wouk "accurately depicts science as an often interactive and collegial enterprise", and that the novel offers a "refreshing contrast with the treatments of mad scientists that are so abundant in literature and popular culture." The review in Nature had some criticism, saying that the "scientific explanations are pat and usually come in the form of long e-mails that bog down the plot", that the discussions of the Chinese people "verge on racism", and that the book's ending "falls flat".
