= The Glory =

1994 novel by Herman Wouk

- First edition cover
- Author: Herman Wouk
- Language: English
- Genre: Historical fiction
- Publisher: Little, Brown & Company
- Publication date: November 1994
- Publication place: United States
- Pages: 683
- ISBN: 0-316-95525-6
- LC Class: 94-23281
- Preceded by: The Hope

The Glory (1994) is the sequel to The Hope written by American author Herman Wouk.

== Plot introduction ==
Interweaving the lives and fates of fictional characters and real-life notables, the sequel to The Hope continues the story of Israeli history to the climactic events of the Yom Kippur War and the promise of peace.

Historical events in the book include:

- The sinking of the Israeli ship Eilat by Soviet rockets fired by the Egyptian Navy.
- The War of Attrition.
- The Yom Kippur War.
- Operation Entebbe.
- The visit of Anwar Sadat to Israel.

Families whose history is chronicled in The Glory:

- Barak-Berkowe-Berkowitz
- Nitzan-Bloom-Blumenthal
- Luria
- Pasternak

Real historical personages in the novel include Yonatan Netanyahu, Golda Meir, Ariel Sharon, Anwar Sadat, Moshe Dayan, and David Elazar.

== See also ==
- Joseph Blumenthal
