= Marjorie Morningstar (novel) =

1955 novel by Herman Wouk

- First edition cover
- Author: Herman Wouk
- Language: English
- Publisher: Doubleday
- Publication date: September 1, 1955
- Publication place: United States
- Media type: Print

Marjorie Morningstar is a 1955 novel by Herman Wouk about a woman who wants to become an actress. Marjorie Morningstar has been called "the first Jewish novel that was popular and successful, not merely to a Jewish audience but to a general one". In 1958, the book was the basis for a Hollywood movie starring Natalie Wood, also titled Marjorie Morningstar.

== Plot ==
Marjorie Morgenstern, born 1916, is a Jewish girl in New York City in the 1930s. She is bright, beautiful, and popular. Her father is a prosperous businessman who has recently moved his family from a poorer, ethnically Jewish neighborhood in the Bronx to Manhattan's Upper West Side. Her mother hopes that the change of neighborhood will help Marjorie marry a man with a brighter future.

Marjorie aspires to become an actress, using Marjorie Morningstar as a stage name. (Morningstar is the word-for-word translation of "Morgenstern" from the original German.) She begins with her school's (Hunter College) production of The Mikado and lands the title role. As a result, she meets Marsha Zelenko, who becomes her best friend (for a while). Marsha encourages Marjorie in her quest and helps her get a job as a drama counselor at the summer camp where Marsha teaches arts and crafts. That summer, Marsha persuades Marjorie to accompany her on an excursion to South Wind, an exclusive resort with a staff of professional entertainers. There Marjorie meets Noel Airman, an older man who has won some fame as a composer, as well as Wally Wronken, a younger man who hopes to become a playwright.

Marjorie idolizes Noel, who can sing, dance, compose, and speak several languages. They begin a relationship that determines the next four years of her life. He tells her that he has no interest in marrying or fitting in with the middle-class life that he tells her she will want. Having changed his birth name from Saul to Noel to escape his Jewish origins, he mocks her Jewish observances (such as her unwillingness to eat bacon) and taunts her for her 'Mosaic' unwillingness to engage in premarital sex. Noel tells Marjorie that she is a "Shirley": a typical, well-brought-up New York Jewish girl who will want a stable husband and family while he is embarking on an artistic career.

Over the course of the novel, neither Noel nor Marjorie finds professional success in the theater. Marjorie accepts that she will not succeed as a professional actress, and she spends more of her time reading and working. Noel takes and quits stable writing and editing jobs, blaming Marjorie for motivating him to take jobs that do not suit him and for his unhappiness. He flees New York in a panic rather than marry Marjorie, saying that he will not succeed as a writer and will return to studying philosophy. Having entered a sexual relationship with him, Marjorie is convinced that her only hope is to marry Noel. She decides that the best way to persuade him to marry her is to wait a year and then pursue him to Paris.

However, en route to France, Marjorie meets a mysterious man named Mike Eden aboard the Queen Mary. She enjoys his company, he treats her well and speaks respectfully of her religious traditions, and he helps her locate Noel. In Paris, Noel tells her how happy he is to see her, but does not notice when she is hungry or hurt. He tells her that in his year in Paris he has not enrolled in school to study philosophy and that he will return to the U.S. to take another stable writing job. He offers to marry her, but Marjorie has realized that life with Noel will not make her happy and that it would be possible for her to fall in love with someone else.

She returns to New York free of her infatuation with Noel, and quickly marries, no longer caring whether Noel would describe her as a "Shirley". The novel concludes with an epilogue in the form of an entry in the diary of Wally Wronken, the only character who did manage to have a successful artistic career. Wally idolized Marjorie as a young man, and he meets her again 15 years after she marries when she has happily settled into a role as a religious suburban wife and mother. Wally recalls the bright-eyed girl he once knew and marvels at how ordinary Marjorie seems at 39.

The character name Airman is a translation to English of the Yiddish word luftmensch. The critic Dan Vogel writes that Wouk casts Noel as a "rasha" or bad or Satanic figure for leading Majorie in a descent from violating traditional Jewish laws of kashrut or kosher laws to violating traditional values of sexual morality.

== Reception ==
Marjorie Morningstar spent at least 37 weeks on The New York Times' bestseller list, for months in the number one position.

The novel was controversial among Jewish writers and religious figures as well as among secular intellectuals. In particular, the depiction of New York Jews was criticized by Leslie Fiedler and Norman Podhoretz. Podhoretz was critical of Marjorie's return to traditional Jewish values at the end of the novel and considered her shallow for not realizing that many customs and traditions "die of their own irrelevance". New York Times reviewer William H. Hudson enjoyed the novel and observed that "a reaffirmation of traditional values, a submission to wisdom of the older generation and of authority and a reacceptance of individual responsibility" was a cornerstone of most of Wouk's fiction and a reflection of the author's acceptance of traditional religious Judaism.

Wouk's fictional depiction of a bar-mitzva was a particular target of criticism. In 1959 in This Is My God, Wouk commented:

I did my best to portray a bar-mitzva with accuracy and with affection. I thought I succeeded pretty well, for my pains I encountered the most bitter and violent objections from some fellow Jews. I had, they asserted, made a sacred occasion seem comical. There were comic touches in the picture, of course, but I believe these lay in the folkway as it exists, not in the imagination of the writer.

With time these criticisms have abated, and two extracts from Marjorie Morningstar have been included in a reader titled The Rise of American Jewish Literature.
