= William A. Zeck =

American judge

William Allen Zeck (1915 - October 26, 2002) was a New York State judge and prosecutor at the Nuremberg war-crimes trials.

== Biography ==
Born and raised in Manhattan, young William graduated from what became Townsend Harris High School before going on to New York University for both his bachelor's degree and law degrees. He practiced law in Rockland County for many years and was the upstate campaign manager for Robert F. Kennedy's campaigns for the Senate and the presidency. Mr. Zeck was also chairman of the 1965 Democratic Campaign Committee in New York State. In 1981, Zeck was elevated to the State Supreme Court in White Plains. After retirement, Judge Zeck was a judicial hearing officer.

At the time of his passing, he was survived by his wife, Belle Mayer Zeck (married 1949), daughter Deborah Zeck Thorne, son John G. Zeck and four grandchildren.

== Career ==
Before joining the army, Zeck worked for the Board of Economic Warfare. He was hired to work on preparations for Nuremberg in 1946, on Telford Taylor's prosecution team, working on the trial of the I. G. Farben company (they "produced synthetic rubber and oil for the German war effort, as well as the killer gas Zyklon-B"). One of their synthetic rubber factories was at Auschwitz, where inmates did the work.

While working, he met fellow attorney and future wife Belle Mayer.

In 1981, Zeck became a judge at the State Supreme Court in White Plains.
