= Youngblood Hawke (film) =

1964 film by Delmer Daves

- Directed by: Delmer Daves
- Written by: Delmer Daves
- Based on: Youngblood Hawke (1962 novel) by Herman Wouk
- Produced by: Delmer Daves
- Starring: James Franciscus; Suzanne Pleshette; Geneviève Page
- Cinematography: Charles Lawton Jr.
- Edited by: Sam O'Steen
- Music by: Max Steiner
- Distributed by: Warner Bros. Pictures
- Release date: November 4, 1964
- Running time: 137 minutes
- Country: United States
- Language: English

Youngblood Hawke is a 1964 American drama film directed by Delmer Daves and starring James Franciscus, Suzanne Pleshette, and Geneviève Page. It was adapted from Herman Wouk's 1962 novel of the same name, which was loosely based on the life of Thomas Wolfe.

== Plot ==
Youngblood Hawke is a Kentucky truck driver who moves to New York City with dreams of becoming a hot-shot writer. Almost immediately he meets editor Jeanne Green. She sees great promise in Hawke's writing and falls for the handsome Kentuckian while helping him put together his first book deal. He begins an affair with Freida Winters, a married woman with three children. Yet, he has feelings for Jeanne, his editor.

His first novel is moderately successful. His second novel is a huge hit and is transformed into a Broadway play by a has-been stage actress. At the same time Hawke begins to build his own publishing house.

His third novel bombs and is panned by critics. His play is not the box office success he had hoped for. Hawke's financial state declines, and he has to move back to Kentucky.

While in Kentucky working on his next book, he contracts pneumonia, and while recovering, he realizes that Jeanne is his ideal woman.

== Cast ==
- James Franciscus as Youngblood Hawke
- Suzanne Pleshette as Jeanne Green
- Geneviève Page as Frieda Winter
- Eva Gabor as Fannie Prince
- Mary Astor as Irene Perry
- Lee Bowman as Jason Prince
- Edward Andrews as Quentin Judd
- Don Porter as Ferdie Lax
- Mildred Dunnock as Mrs. Sarah Hawke
- Kent Smith as Paul Winter Sr.
- John Dehner as Scotty Hawke
- John Emery as Georges Feydal
- Mark Miller as Ross Hodge
- Hayden Rorke as Mr. Givney
- Werner Klemperer as Mr. Leffer
- Mary Lawrence as Mrs. Givney (uncredited cameo)
- Martin Balsam as himself (uncredited cameo)
- Pat Cardi as Paul Winter Jr.

== Production ==
In September 1962, Warner Bros. Pictures announced that Delmer Daves would write, produce and direct a feature film based on the novel. Daves previously made A Summer Place, Parrish, Susan Slade and Rome Adventure for the studio, all of which had starred Troy Donahue.

Daves spent time deciding which part of the novel he wanted to film. He decided to start with Hawke's rise while driving a truck and end with his recovery in hospital from a near death. The original script took six weeks to write. It was 140 pages in fine print, which would have run six to seven hours. He then cut the script after looking at various locations.

The lead role was offered to Warren Beatty, who demanded a fee of $200,000 plus script and cast approval. George Peppard, Stuart Whitman and Terence Stamp also were discussed. James Franciscus was cast without even a screen test. (Daves saw him in The Outsider and the pilot for Mr Novak.) He signed in March 1963.

The female lead went to Suzanne Pleshette, who made Rome Adventure with Daves.

Filming began on location in New York in April 1963.

== See also ==
- List of American films of 1964
