= Youngblood Hawke =

1962 novel by American writer Herman Wouk

- First edition
- Author: Herman Wouk
- Language: English
- Published: May 18, 1962
- Publisher: Doubleday
- Publication place: United States
- Media type: Book
- Pages: 783
- ISBN: 9780385029742
- OCLC: 1408992

Youngblood Hawke is a 1962 novel by American writer Herman Wouk about the rise and fall of a talented young writer of hardscrabble Kentucky origin who briefly becomes the toast of literary New York City. The plot was suggested by the life of the North Carolina-born novelist Thomas Wolfe.

The story was serialized in McCalls magazine from March to July 1962.

== Synopsis ==
Youngblood Hawke is the story of Arthur Youngblood Hawke, an ex-Navy man from rural Kentucky who comes to New York to publish his first novel Alms for Oblivion. Arthur's late father had literary ambitions, but his mother has a more worldly temperament and spends years trying to pry a fortune from family relations in the coal mining business. Hawke's parentage helps explain the conflict between his mastery of the written word and his sometimes obsessive hunt for wealth.

After publishing his first novel, he falls in with an older married woman, Frieda Winter, with whom he maintains an emotionally tumultuous affair for too long. He also carries a torch for Jeanne Green, his editor who has helped make his work commercially viable. His second novel is an unqualified success, and he becomes a literary sensation.

His fame carries with it some wealth, but Arthur has a weakness for building even more wealth fast. He gets involved with Scott Hoag, a builder from his own town, who gives him the opportunity to participate in real estate developments, such as suburban shopping centers. In a few years, Arthur overextends himself and gets seriously in debt.

In the end, he works himself to death between the money he owes; jealousy over Jeanne, the love of his life (who married a man she didn't love to spite him) and the tragedy of the suicide of Frieda Winter's son, for which Hawke feels responsible. A head trauma from his days of coal trucking also comes into play, and (like Thomas Wolfe) he eventually dies of an infection at a young age. In his legacy after death, he achieves the status that he had sought while alive.

== Film adaptation ==
Warner Brothers adapted the novel into a black-and-white film production in 1964; it featured a musical score composed by longtime Warners staff composer Max Steiner. Released on November 4, 1964, the film had a running time of 137 minutes. Reportedly to save costs, the film was shot in black and white at a time when most major productions were made in color. It was directed by Delmer Daves from a screenplay by Wouk and Daves, and starred James Franciscus as Hawke.
