= Inside, Outside =

1985 Herman Wouk novel

- First edition
- Author: Herman Wouk
- Language: English
- Genre: Historical novel
- Publisher: Little Brown & Co
- Publication date: March 1985
- Publication place: United States
- Media type: Print (Hardback & Paperback)
- ISBN: 0-316-95504-3
- OCLC: 11399665
- Dewey Decimal: 813/.54 19
- LC Class: PS3545.O98 I5 1985

Inside, Outside is a 1985 Herman Wouk novel telling the story of four generations of a Russian Jewish family and its travails in Russia and America. The work is semi-autobiographical, and has been called "the closest thing Wouk gets to a true autobiography". It is told in the first person from the viewpoint of Israel David Goodkind, the third of the four generations in the book. Goodkind, a Democrat, takes a job in the White House as a Special Assistant (for cultural/Jewish affairs) to the President, just before the Yom Kippur War and Watergate. Although the President is never named, it is clear that it is Richard Nixon. The narrative refers explicitly to the Watergate scandal, as an event contemporaneous with Goodkind's employment in the White House.

== Plot summary ==
The story alternates between Goodkind's telling his family history and early years (specifically, his first 26 years (1915–1941)) and his account of current events in 1973, leading up to the Yom Kippur War. The tales of Goodkind's early years describe his family – his mother and father, his sister, his mother's father and father's mother, his mother's half sister, and a tribe of more distant uncles, aunts and cousins (the 'Mishpokha', Yiddish for 'family'). After college, Goodkind works for Harry Goldhandler, a gag writer for radio comedies (very loosely based on David Freedman), and has a romance with showgirl Bobbie Webb. The tales of his present day in 1973 are centered on his wife, his daughter, their friends, and Peter Quat, a college friend who also worked for Goldhandler, and who had become a famous novelist for his sexually explicit characters and unflattering depictions of American Jewish life. Quat's books seem similar to the work of Philip Roth, but Roth did not attend Columbia nor work for Freedman.

As a young man, Goodkind becomes less observant, but his adult self has returned to the Orthodox practices of his father and grandfather. Goodkind as a child and young man is embarrassed by his first name Israel, mockingly shortened by several other characters to Izzy. In the last scene of the novel when Goodkind returns to the U.S. after the Yom Kippur War, he tells an El Al flight attendant to call him Israel.

== References to history and geography ==
Among the famous people Goodkind comes face to face with in the course of the book besides Nixon are Golda Meir, Zero Mostel, Bert Lahr, Marlene Dietrich, John Barrymore, Ernest Hemingway, Leslie Howard, and the brothers George Gershwin and Ira Gershwin. Goodkind visits Israel during the Yom Kippur War, carries a secret letter from Golda Meir to Richard Nixon, and rides back to Israel with the U.S. Air Force airlift of supplies.

== Reception ==
Kirkus Reviews found that "Wouk's material (devoid of suspense, short on character and plot) seems more suited to a 200-page memoir than a 650-page fiction" and thought that "Wouk's viewpoints (traditional, Orthodox, Zionist) sometimes emerge in unappetizing flavors". However, it concluded that the novel is "generously stuffed with zestfully old-fashioned humor and sentiment".

The New York Times was harsher, stating that "the evocation of Jewish life in Russia and the Bronx seems pretty tepid", and finding the novel predictable, morally ambiguous, and smug.

More recently, commentators have seen such contemporary reviews as part of a general tendency to dismiss Wouk's work, including Inside, Outside. The Washington Independent Review of Books, in a warm article written in Wouk's hundredth year, cites Inside, Outside as one of his myriad "popular, prodigious, and prestigious works". Commentary (magazine) devotes an article to how it wronged Wouk, noting that "The phenomenally successful The Winds of War (1971) was never reviewed [by this magazine], nor was Wouk’s own favorite work, Inside, Outside". It concludes by noting "the moral seriousness that lies at the heart of the work of Herman Wouk — a seriousness that this magazine, alas, was too blind to see and perhaps a mite too snooty to celebrate".
