= The Winds of War =

1971 novel by Herman Wouk

- First edition cover
- Author: Herman Wouk
- Language: English
- Genre: War novel
- Publisher: Little, Brown and Company
- Publication date: November 1971
- Publication place: United States
- Media type: Print (Hardcover)
- Pages: 885 pp.
- ISBN: 0-316-95500-0
- Dewey Decimal: 813/.5/4
- LC Class: PZ3.W923 Wi3 PS3545.O98
- Followed by: War and Remembrance

The Winds of War is Herman Wouk's second book about World War II (the first being The Caine Mutiny). Published in 1971, The Winds of War was followed up seven years later by War and Remembrance; originally conceived as one volume, Wouk decided to break it into two volumes when he realized it took nearly 1,000 pages just to get to the attack on Pearl Harbor.

The book was adapted into a highly successful miniseries in 1983. In 2020, a new miniseries adaptation was announced.

== Overview ==
The novel features a mixture of real and fictional characters who are all connected to the extended family of Victor "Pug" Henry, a fictional middle-aged naval officer and confidant of President Franklin Delano Roosevelt. The story arc begins six months before Germany's invasion of Poland in September 1939 and ends shortly after the attack on Pearl Harbor on December 7, 1941, when the United States and, by extension, the Henry family, enters the war as well.

Wouk interspersed the narrative text with epistolic "excerpts" taken from a book written by one of the book's fictional characters, German general Armin von Roon, while he was in prison for war crimes. Victor Henry translates the volume in 1965 after coming across von Roon's German version. While the texts provide the reader with a German outlook on the war, Henry occasionally inserts notes as counterpoints to some of von Roon's statements.

== Plot ==
In 1939 Navy Commander Victor "Pug" Henry has been appointed US Naval attaché in Berlin. During the voyage to Europe aboard SS Bremen, Victor befriends a British radio personality, Alistair Talcott "Talky" Tudsbury, his daughter, Pamela, and a German submarine officer, Commodore Grobke. In the television version, he also meets German General Armin von Roon. In the book he only meets von Roon later at a Berlin dinner party. Von Roon becomes the viewpoint character for the German side of the war and witnesses the German government's worsening persecution of the Jews.

Pug quickly recognizes—through his work as the attaché—that Nazi Germany is intent on invading Poland. Realizing that this would mean war with the Soviet Union, he concludes that the only way for Germany to safely invade is to agree not to go to war with the Soviets. Pug submits a report back to Washington—going over his supervisor's head—which predicts the Nazi–Soviet non-aggression pact before it is signed. When the pact is made public, Pug's report draws him to the attention of President Roosevelt, who asks the Navy Commander to be his unofficial eyes and ears in Europe. Although this new assignment again delays his desired sea command, it gives him the opportunity to travel to London, Rome, and Moscow where he meets Winston Churchill, Benito Mussolini, and Joseph Stalin in addition to Adolf Hitler, whom he met in Berlin.

Due to Pug's increasing amount of travel and his aversion to many of the cultural events which are enjoyed by his wife, Rhoda, she spends increasing amounts of time alone. Through Pug, she meets a widowed engineer named Palmer (Fred) Kirby, who later will be involved in the first phase of the Manhattan Project. Rhoda and Palmer begin to spend time together attending the opera and other events, but soon this leads to a romantic relationship. For his part, Pug begins a platonic but very close and borderline romantic relationship with Pamela; however, he cannot decide to leave his wife Rhoda for her.

After having finally obtained command of a battleship, USS California, he leaves for Pearl Harbor from Moscow, where he has discussed Lend-Lease issues and observed a battle. He flies over Asia and spends time in Manila listening to the radio broadcast of the annual Army–Navy football game. When his flight is approaching Pearl Harbor, they receive the message that an attack is under way. Arriving at the base, they see the burning ships, including his own.

Pug's three children each have their own story lines. His older son, Warren, is a United States Naval Academy graduate who enters Navy Flight School in Florida. His daughter, Madeline, begins a job in a radio company.

The child most prominent in the story is middle child and younger son Byron, named after Lord Byron, the English poet. Though a Columbia University graduate and holding a naval reserve commission, Byron has not committed himself to a career. In 1939 he accepts a job as a research assistant for an expatriate Jewish author, Aaron Jastrow, who is best known for his book A Jew's Jesus and lives in Siena, Italy.

Byron also meets Jastrow's niece, Natalie, and her soon-to-be fiancé, Leslie Slote, who works for the Department of State. Readers later discover that Natalie and Slote are also close friends of Pamela Tudsbury from their time in Paris together. Byron is three years younger than Natalie, but catches her attention by heroically saving her uncle from being trampled by a stampeding horse during the Palio, a festival in Siena.

Byron and Natalie visit her family's native town in Poland, Medzice, for a wedding, which occurs the night prior to the German invasion of Poland. They are awakened early the next morning to evacuate as the town citizens flee from the invaders. They travel from Medzice to Warsaw ahead of the invading German army, and at one point the refugees are strafed by the Luftwaffe and many are killed and injured. As they approach Warsaw, they encounter Polish soldiers who confiscate Byron's passport and attempt to commandeer their automobile and leave them stranded. Finally, they are in Warsaw as the Germans begin the siege and are evacuated along with other Americans and citizens of neutral countries.

During their encounters with the German and Polish soldiers, Byron repeatedly behaves heroically. Leslie behaves in cowardly fashion under artillery fire, but stands up to the Germans when they attempt to separate Jewish Americans from their group. When Natalie receives the proposal of marriage from Leslie that she has been eagerly awaiting, she realizes that the experience in Poland has changed her heart and that she is now in love with Byron. After much beating around the bush, she admits this to Byron, who promptly offers his own proposal of marriage, which Natalie accepts. She returns to America upon receiving word that her father is quite ill, and she is also able to attend Warren's wedding. Her father dies of a heart attack upon hearing of the invasion of Norway and Denmark on April 9, 1940.

In January 1941, she marries Byron and devotes herself to getting her reluctant uncle out of Europe to escape the Nazis, soon discovering she is pregnant.

All of the story lines are left as a cliffhanger as the United States is drawn into the war by the attack on Pearl Harbor. Rhoda makes and then retracts a request for a divorce. With USS California damaged and out of action, Pug is given command of a cruiser, USS Northampton. Byron has been trained as a submarine officer. Warren has graduated from Pensacola, married a Congressman's daughter, Janice Lacouture, and is assigned to USS Enterprise as a dive bomber pilot. Aaron, Natalie, and Natalie's infant son Louis are trapped in Europe as the United States is plunged into the global conflict. These storylines continue in War and Remembrance.

== Author's viewpoint and focus ==
Wouk never presumes to read the minds of historical characters; only fictional characters have thoughts the reader can share in this novel. Wouk wrote that the novel was a traditional and linear narrative of the war that began with the cataclysmic event of Pearl Harbor

Where we entered the ordeal that ended with our martial triumph, our temporary nuclear supremacy, and our global leadership that has since became our unwanted glory and our leaden burden. In The Winds of War, I have tried to evoke the whole historic—that is linear—drift to that shattering moment.

Wouk wrote that in "'The Winds of War,' I did my best to shake up the familiar elements in the kaleidoscope of art, to give them an organizing vision and a shape, so that he who runs might read and picture what happened in this worst world catastrophe—the worst, that is, so far."

== Reception ==
The Winds of War was #9 on The New York Times Best Seller list for November 28, 1971. Critical reviews were generally negative.

== Miniseries ==
The book was adapted in 1983 into a highly successful miniseries on the ABC television network, directed and produced by Dan Curtis. Just as in the book, in addition to the lives of the Henry and Jastrow families, much time in the miniseries is devoted to the major global events of the early years of World War II. Adolf Hitler and the German General Staff, with the fictitious general Armin von Roon as a major character, is a prominent subplot of the miniseries. The Winds of War also includes segments of documentary footage, narrated by William Woodson, to explain major events and important characters. With 140 million viewers of part or all of Winds of War, it was the most-watched miniseries at that time. It was followed by a sequel, War and Remembrance, in 1988, also based on a novel written by Wouk and also directed and produced by Curtis.

In 2020, a new miniseries adaptation of The Winds of War was announced, to be co-written by Seth MacFarlane as his first project with NBCUniversal.

== See also ==
- War and Remembrance
- War and Remembrance (miniseries)
