= Herman Wouk =

American writer (1915–2019)

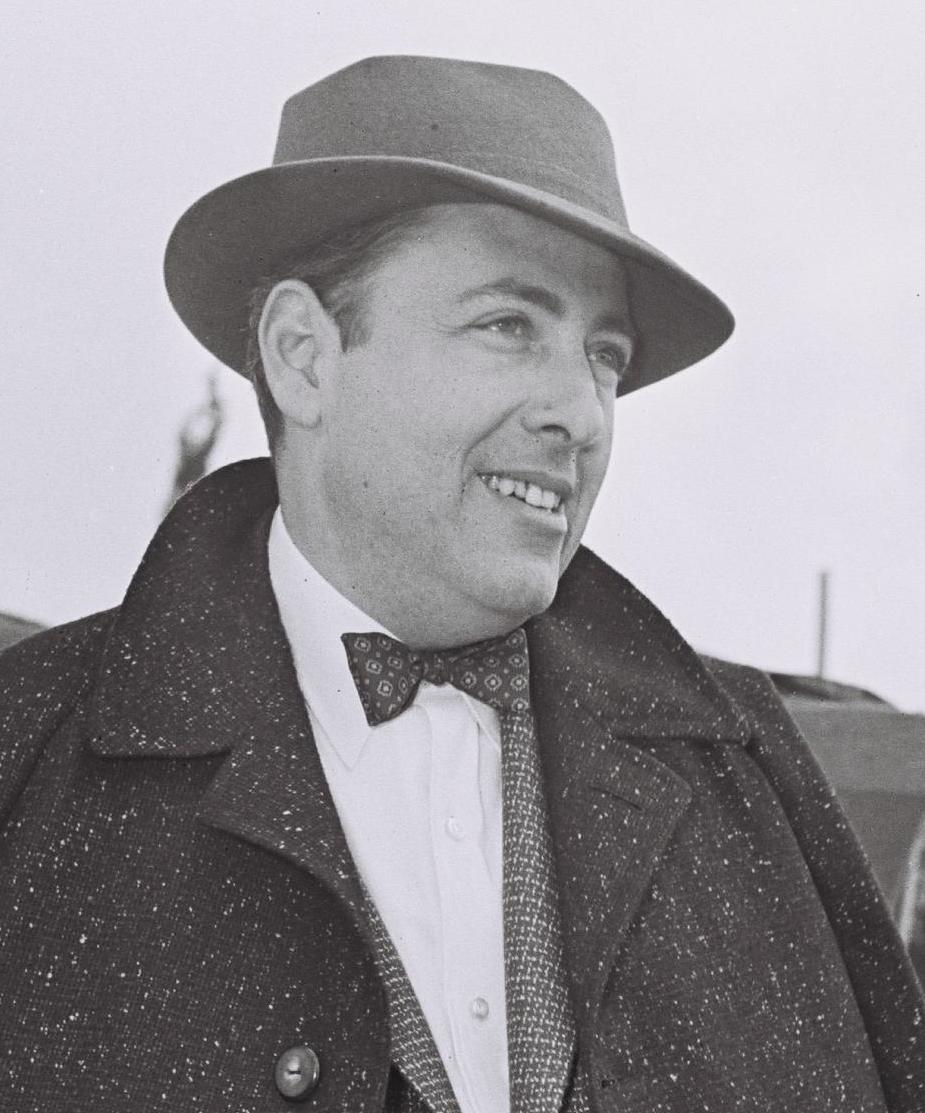
- Wouk in 1955
- Born: May 27, 1915; New York City, U.S.
- Died: May 17, 2019 (aged 103); Palm Springs, California, U.S.
- Resting place: Beth David Cemetery
- Education: Columbia University (B.A., 1934)
- Occupation: Author
- Spouse: Betty Brown (m. 1945; died 2011)
- Children: 3
- Relatives: Victor Wouk (brother); Alan I. Green (nephew)
- Writing career
- Period: 1941–2015
- Notable works: The Caine Mutiny; The Winds of War; War and Remembrance; This Is My God
- Military career
- Allegiance: US
- Branch: United States Navy
- Service years: 1942–1946
- Rank: Lieutenant
- Commands: Executive Officer, USS Southard (DD-207/DMS-10)
- Conflicts: World War II (Pacific Theater); New Georgia campaign; Gilbert and Marshall Islands campaign; Mariana and Palau Islands campaign; Battle of Okinawa
- Website: www.hermanwouk.com

Herman Wouk (/woʊk/ WOHK; May 27, 1915 – May 17, 2019) was an American author. He published 15 novels, many of them historical fiction such as The Caine Mutiny (1951), for which he won the Pulitzer Prize for Fiction in 1952. Other well-known works included The Winds of War and War and Remembrance (historical novels about World War II), the bildungsroman Marjorie Morningstar; and non-fiction such as This Is My God, an explanation of Judaism from a Modern Orthodox perspective, written for Jewish and non-Jewish readers. His books have been translated into 27 languages.

The Washington Post described Wouk, who cherished his privacy, as "the reclusive dean of American historical novelists". Historians, novelists, publishers, and critics who gathered at the Library of Congress in 1995 to mark his 80th birthday described him as an American Tolstoy. Wouk's career was extensive and he lived to 103.

== Early life ==
Wouk was born in the Bronx, New York, the second of three children born to Esther (née Levine) and Abraham Isaac Wouk, Russian Jewish immigrants from what is today Belarus. His father toiled for many years to raise the family out of poverty before opening a successful laundry service.

When Wouk was 13, his maternal grandfather, a Rabbi named Mendel Leib Levine, came from Minsk to live with them and took charge of his grandson's Jewish education. Wouk was frustrated by the amount of time he was expected to spend studying the Talmud, but his father told him, "if I were on my deathbed, and I had breath to say one more thing to you, I would say 'Study the Talmud.'" Eventually Wouk took this advice to heart. After a brief period as a young adult during which he lived a secular life, he returned to religious practice and Judaism became integral to both his personal life and his career. He said later that his grandfather and the United States Navy were the two most important influences on his life.

After his childhood and adolescence in the Bronx, Wouk graduated from the original Townsend Harris High School in Manhattan, Townsend Harris Hall Prep School, the elite public prep school for City College. In 1934 he earned a Bachelor of Arts degree at the age of 19 from Columbia University, where he was a member of the Pi Lambda Phi fraternity. He also served as editor of the university's humor magazine, Jester, was a member of the Philolexian Society, and wrote two of its annual Varsity Shows. He became a radio dramatist, working in David Freedman's "Joke Factory" and later with Fred Allen for five years and then, in 1941, for the United States government, writing radio spots to sell war bonds.

== Military career ==
Following the attack on Pearl Harbor, Wouk joined the U.S. Naval Reserve in 1942 and served in the Pacific Theater during World War II, an experience he later characterized as educational: "I learned about machinery, I learned how men behaved under pressure, and I learned about Americans." Wouk served as an officer aboard two destroyer minesweepers (DMS), the USS Zane and USS Southard, becoming executive officer of the Southard while holding the rank of lieutenant. He participated in around six invasions and won a number of battle stars. Wouk was in the New Georgia Campaign, the Gilbert and Marshall Islands campaign, the Mariana and Palau Islands campaign, and the Battle of Okinawa.

In off-duty hours aboard ship he started writing a novel, Aurora Dawn, which he originally titled Aurora Dawn; or, The True history of Andrew Reale, containing a faithful account of the Great Riot, together with the complete texts of Michael Wilde's oration and Father Stanfield's sermon. Wouk sent a copy of the opening chapters to philosophy professor Irwin Edman, under whom he studied at Columbia, who quoted a few pages verbatim to a New York editor. The result was a publisher's contract sent to Wouk's ship, then off the coast of Okinawa. Aurora Dawn was published in 1947 and became a Book of the Month Club main selection.

Wouk finished his tour of duty in 1946.

== Writing career ==
His second novel, City Boy, proved to be a commercial disappointment when it was published in 1948. Wouk claimed it was largely ignored amid the excitement over Norman Mailer's bestselling World War II novel The Naked and the Dead.

While writing his next novel, Wouk read each chapter to his wife as it was completed and she remarked that if they did not like this one, he had better take up another line of work (a line he would give to the character of the editor Jeannie Fry in his novel Youngblood Hawke, 1962). The novel, The Caine Mutiny (1951), won the Pulitzer Prize for Fiction. A best-seller, drawn from his wartime experiences aboard minesweepers during World War II, The Caine Mutiny was adapted by the author into a Broadway play called The Caine Mutiny Court-Martial. In 1954 Columbia Pictures released a film version of the book, with Humphrey Bogart portraying Lt. Commander Philip Francis Queeg, captain of the fictional USS Caine.

Wouk's next novel after The Caine Mutiny was Marjorie Morningstar (1955), which earned him a Time magazine cover story. Three years later Warner Bros. made it into a movie of the same name starring Natalie Wood, Gene Kelly and Claire Trevor. His next novel, a paperback, was Slattery's Hurricane (1956), which he had written in 1948 as the basis for the screenplay for the film of the same name. Wouk's first work of non-fiction was 1959's This Is My God: The Jewish Way of Life.

In the 1960s, he wrote Youngblood Hawke (1962), a drama about the rise and fall of a young writer, modeled on the life of Thomas Wolfe; and Don't Stop the Carnival (1965), a comedy about escaping mid-life crisis by moving to the Caribbean, which was loosely based on Wouk's own experiences. Youngblood Hawke was serialized in McCall's magazine from March to July 1962. A movie version starred James Franciscus and Suzanne Pleshette and was released by Warner Brothers in 1964. In 1997 Don't Stop the Carnival was turned into a short-lived musical by Jimmy Buffett.

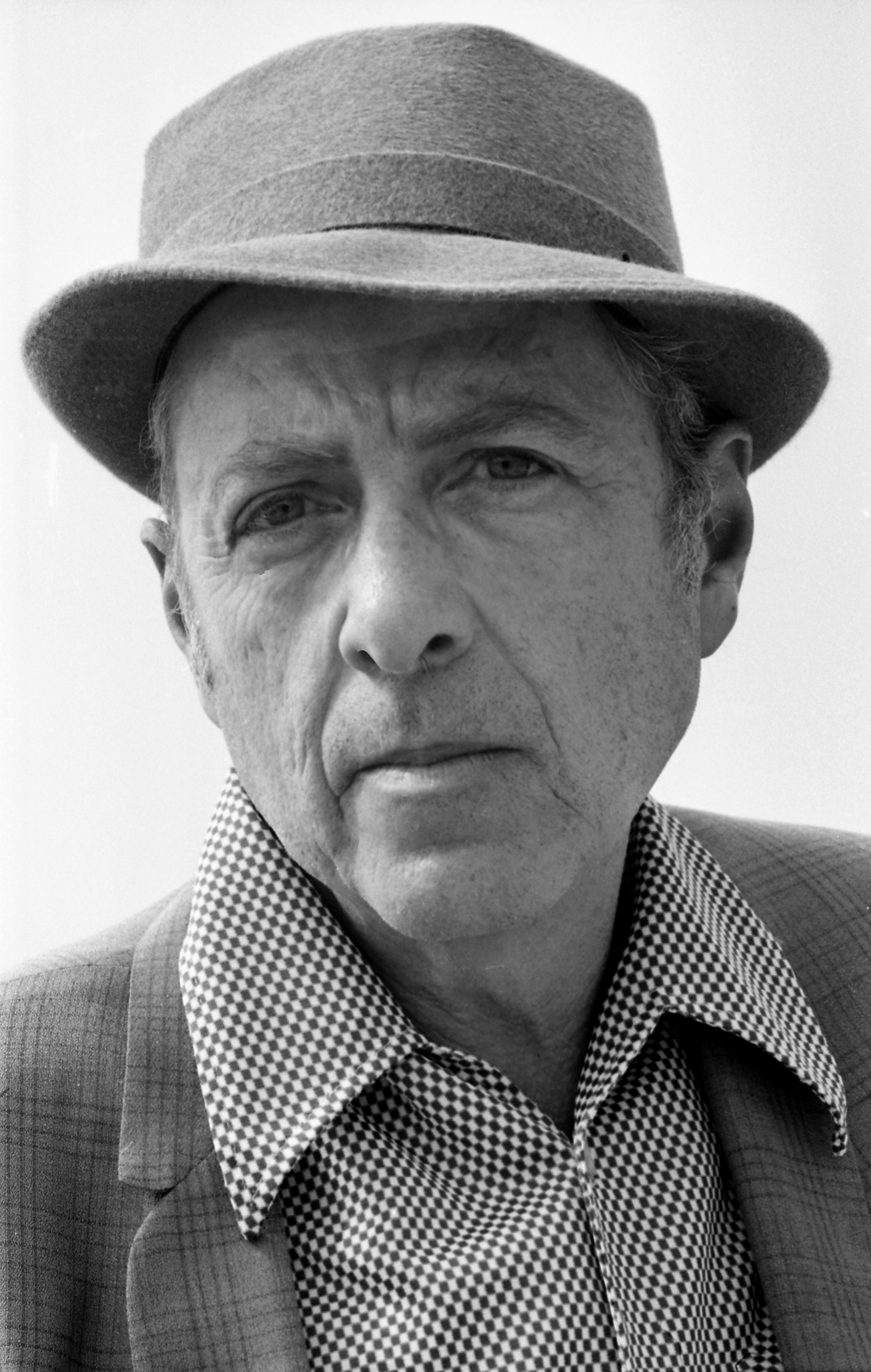
Wouk in 1972

In the 1970s, Wouk published two monumental novels, The Winds of War (1971) and a sequel, War and Remembrance (1978). He described Remembrance, which included a devastating depiction of the Holocaust, as "the main tale I have to tell." Both were made into successful television mini-series, the first in 1983 and the second in 1988. Although they were made several years apart, both were directed by Dan Curtis and both starred Robert Mitchum as Captain Victor "Pug" Henry, the main character. The novels were historical fiction. Each had three layers: the story told from the viewpoints of Captain Henry and his circle of family and friends; a more or less straightforward historical account of the events of the war; and an analysis by a member of Adolf Hitler's military staff, the insightful fictional General Armin von Roon. Wouk devoted "thirteen years of extraordinary research and long, arduous composition" to these two novels, noted Arnold Beichman. "The seriousness with which Wouk has dealt with the war can be seen in the prodigious amount of research, reading, travel and conferring with experts, the evidence of which may be found in the uncatalogued boxes at Columbia University" that contain the author's papers.

On December 6, 1972, Wouk gave the inaugural Raymond A. Spruance lecture, titled "The Naval Officer in an Age of Revolution," in Spruance Hall at the U.S. Naval War College. According to Vice Admiral Stansfield Turner, who introduced the lecture, Wouk was selected because he was a "Navy man through and through" and a "master strategist." The lecture covered the industrial revolution, socialism, the American moon missions, nationalism, Aleksandr Solzhenitsyn, and Spruance's heroic command at the Battle of Midway. On April 16, 1980, Wouk gave a second Spruance lecture, called "Sadness and Hope: Some Thoughts on Modern Warfare," in which he introduced the idea of a "Thucydides trap." Comparing the U.S.-Soviet Cold War to the rivalry that emerged between Athens and Sparta after they had vanquished their common enemy, Persia, Wouk observed:

And more than two millenia [sic] later we seem still trapped in Thucydides' world. None of the ways in which those quarrelsome Greeks behaved is suited to these dread times of nuclear menace; yet we still behave in those ways, and can find no other. How do we break out of this Thucydidean trap, which now threatens to strangle, if not to destroy, our world?

Wouk's theme across both lectures was freedom and the importance of those who stand in the breach, fight against the odds, and serve to protect it.

Inside, Outside (1985) was the story of four generations of a Russian Jewish family and its travails in Russia, the U.S. and Israel. The Hope (1993) and its sequel, The Glory (1994), were historical novels about the first 33 years of Israel's history. They were followed by The Will to Live On: This is Our Heritage (2000), a whirlwind tour of Jewish history and sacred texts and companion volume to This is My God.

In 1995, Wouk was honored on his 80th birthday by the Library of Congress with a symposium on his career. In attendance were David McCullough, Robert Caro, and Daniel Boorstin, among others.

A Hole in Texas (2004) was a novel about the discovery of the Higgs boson, whose existence was proven nine years later. The Language God Talks: On Science and Religion (2010) was an exploration of the tension between religion and science which originated in a discussion Wouk had with theoretical physicist Richard Feynman.

The Lawgiver (2012) was an epistolary novel about a contemporary Hollywood writer of a movie script about Moses, with the consulting help of a nonfictional character, Herman Wouk, a "mulish ancient" who became involved despite the strong misgivings of his wife.

Wouk's memoir, titled Sailor and Fiddler: Reflections of a 100-Year-Old Author, was published in January 2016 to mark his 100th birthday. NPR called it "a lovely coda to the career of a man who made American literature a kinder, smarter, better place." It was his last book.

== Daily journal ==
Wouk kept a personal diary from 1937. On September 10, 2008, he presented his journals, numbering more than 100 volumes as of 2012, to the Library of Congress at a ceremony in which he was honored with the first Library of Congress Lifetime Achievement Award for the Writing of Fiction (now the Library of Congress Prize for American Fiction). Wouk often referred to his journals to check dates and facts in his writing, and he hesitated to let the originals out of his possession. A solution was negotiated and the entire set of volumes was scanned into digital format.

== Personal life ==
In 1944 Wouk met Betty Sarah Brown, a Phi Beta Kappa graduate of the University of Southern California, who was working as a personnel specialist in the navy while the Zane was undergoing repairs in San Pedro, California. The two fell in love and after Wouk's ship went back to sea, Betty, who was born a Protestant and was raised in Grangeville, Idaho, began her study of Judaism and converted on her twenty-fifth birthday. They were married on December 10, 1945.

After the birth of the first of their three children the following year, Wouk became a full-time writer to support his growing family. His first-born son, Abraham Isaac Wouk, who was named after Wouk's late father, drowned in a swimming pool accident in Cuernavaca, Mexico, shortly before his fifth birthday. Wouk later dedicated War and Remembrance to him with the Biblical words "בלע המות לנצח – He will destroy death forever" (Isaiah 25:8). Their second and third children were Iolanthe Woulff (born 1950 as Nathaniel Wouk, a Princeton University graduate and an author) and Joseph (born 1954, a Columbia graduate, an attorney, a film producer, and a writer who served in the Israeli Navy). He had three grandchildren.

The Wouks lived in New York, Saint Thomas, U.S. Virgin Islands, where he wrote Don't Stop the Carnival, and at 3255 N Street N.W. in the Georgetown section of Washington, D.C., where he researched and wrote The Winds of War and War and Remembrance, before settling in Palm Springs, California. His wife, who served for decades as his literary agent, died in Palm Springs on March 17, 2011.

"I wrote nothing that was of the slightest consequence before I met Sarah," Wouk recalled after her death. "I was a gag man for Fred Allen for five years. In his time, he was the greatest of the radio comedians. And jokes work for what they are but they're ephemeral. They just disappear. And that was the kind of thing I did up until the time that I met Sarah and we married. And I would say my literary career and my mature life both began with her."

During the 1970s, Wouk was a member of the executive committee of the Writers and Artists for Peace in the Middle East, a pro-Israel group.

Wouk's brother Victor died in 2005. His nephew, Alan I. Green, was a psychiatrist at Dartmouth College.

== Death ==
Wouk died in his sleep in his home in Palm Springs, California, on May 17, 2019, ten days before his 104th birthday.

== Degrees ==
- Columbia University, New York, 1934 (A.B.)
- Yeshiva University, New York, 1954 (Hon. L.H.D.)
- Clark University, Worcester, Massachusetts, 1960 (Hon. D.Lit.)
- American International College, Springfield, Massachusetts, 1979 (Hon. Litt.D.)
- Bar-Ilan University, Ramat Gan, Israel, 1990 (Hon. Ph.D.)
- Hebrew University of Jerusalem, 1997
- Trinity College, Hartford, Connecticut, 1998
- The George Washington University, Washington, D.C., 2001 (Hon. D.Litt.)

== Awards and honors ==
- Pulitzer Prize for Fiction, 1952
- Columbia University Medal for Excellence, 1952
- Alexander Hamilton Medal, 1980
- Golden Plate Award, American Academy of Achievement, 1986
- United States Navy Memorial Foundation Lone Sailor Award, 1987
- Bar-Ilan University Guardian of Zion Award, 1998
- Jewish Book Council Lifetime Literary Achievement Award, 1999
- Library of Congress Lifetime Achievement Award for the Writing of Fiction (inaugural), 2008

== Published works ==
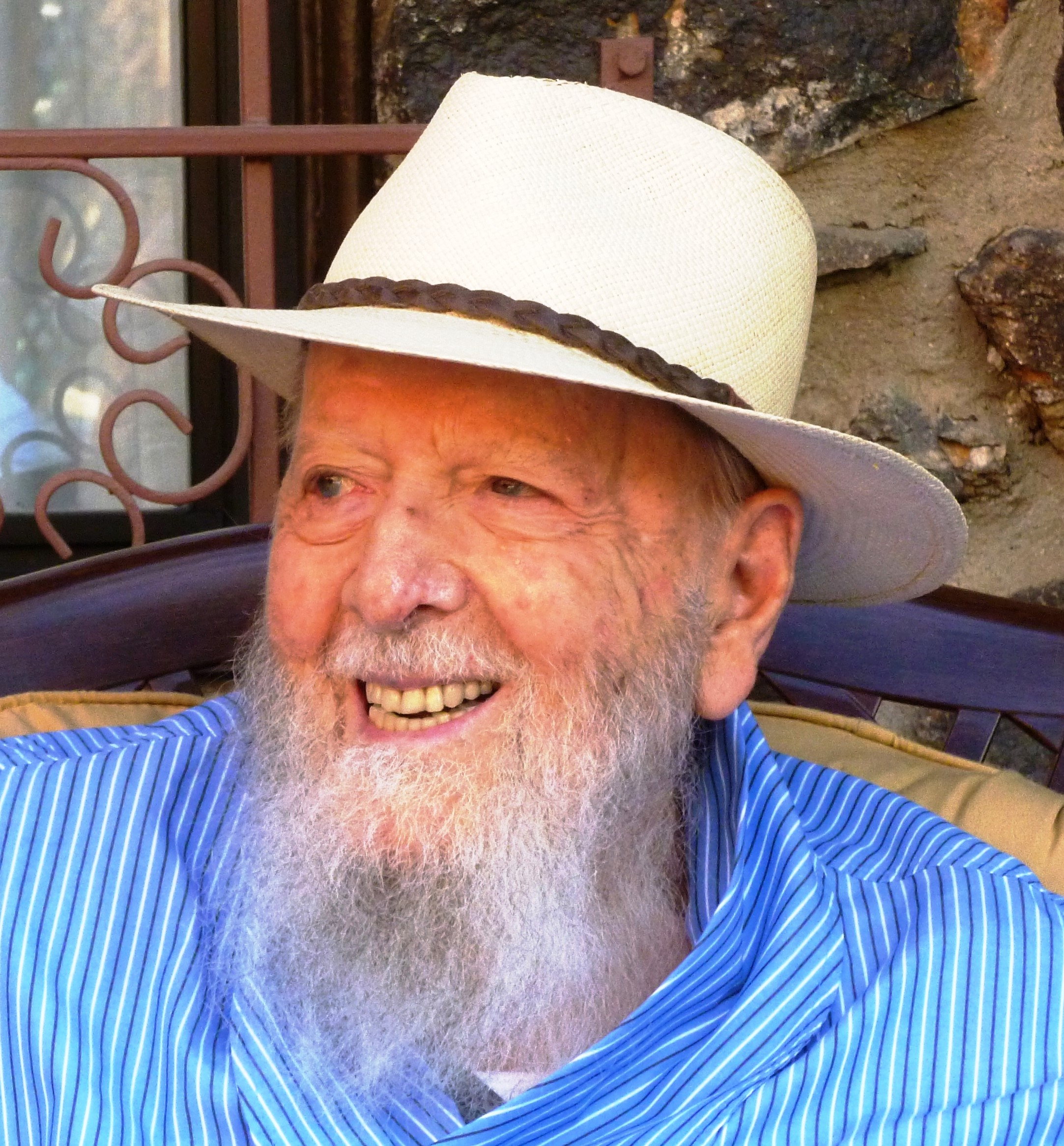
Wouk in 2014

=== Novels ===
- Aurora Dawn (1947)
- City Boy: The Adventures of Herbie Bookbinder (1948)
- The Caine Mutiny (1951)
- Marjorie Morningstar (1955)
- Slattery's Hurricane (1956)
- The "Lomokome" Papers (written in 1949, published in 1956)
- Youngblood Hawke (1962)
- Don't Stop the Carnival (1965)
- The Winds of War (1971)
- War and Remembrance (1978)
- Inside, Outside (1985)
- The Hope (1993)
- The Glory (1994)
- A Hole in Texas (2004)
- The Lawgiver (2012)

=== Non-fiction ===
- This is My God: The Jewish Way of Life (1959, revised ed. 1973, revised ed. 1988, non-fiction)
- The Will to Live On: This is Our Heritage (2000, non-fiction)
- The Language God Talks: On Science and Religion (2010, non-fiction)
- Sailor and Fiddler: Reflections of a 100-Year Old Author (2015, non-fiction)

=== Plays ===
- The Man in the Trench Coat (1941)
- A Modern Primitive (1952, unpublished)
- The Traitor (1949)
- The Caine Mutiny Court-Martial (1953)
- Nature's Way (1957, play)

=== Film and television scripts ===
- Slattery's Hurricane (1949)
- Her First Romance (1951, story)
- Confidentially Connie (1953, story)
- The Winds of War (1983)
- War and Remembrance (1988–89)

== See also ==
- Herman Wouk Is Still Alive
