= War and Remembrance =

1978 novel by Herman Wouk

- First edition cover
- Author: Herman Wouk
- Language: English
- Genre: War novel
- Published: October 1978 (Little, Brown & Company)
- Media type: Print (Hardback & Paperback)
- Pages: 1042 pp (first edition, hardback)

War and Remembrance is a novel by Herman Wouk, published in October 1978 as the sequel to Wouk's The Winds of War (1971). The Winds of War covers the period 1939 to 1941, and War and Remembrance continues the story of the extended Henry and Jastrow families from 15 December 1941 through 6 August 1945. The novel was adapted into a television mini-series, War and Remembrance, and presented on American television in 1988.

== Plot ==
War and Remembrance completes the cycle that began with The Winds of War. The story includes historical occurrences at Midway, Yalta, Guadalcanal, and El Alamein as well as the Allied invasions at Normandy and the Philippines.

One of the more significant themes in the novel and one that occurs in many of Wouk's works is a rediscovery of a central character's Jewish identity. Biblical scholar Aaron Jastrow and his niece Natalie Henry's experience of the Holocaust and their internment in Theresienstadt Ghetto are the events that trigger their newfound identification with their Judaism, Jastrow having formerly converted to Catholicism. "Jastrow is transformed from a rational professor with only marginal awareness of his Jewishness into a passionate champion of his Jewish integrity" according to one reviewer.

The action moves back and forth between the characters against the backdrop of World War II: Victor "Pug" Henry takes part in various battles while separating from his wife. Pug's older son Warren, a naval aviator, and younger son, Byron, a submarine officer, also participate in combat. Warren is killed at the battle of Midway. Byron's wife Natalie is trapped in Axis territory with her uncle, celebrated author Aaron Jastrow, and another major strand focuses on their story as Jews caught in Europe. Like most Americans, Natalie and Aaron fail to believe that the civilized German culture with which they are familiar could possibly engage in genocide. As a result of their rash decision to stay when they could escape, they are slowly absorbed into the Jewish population that is first interned, then sent to concentration camps. As Byron attempts to find out what is happening to them, eventually tracking them down amidst the chaos of wartime Europe, the story of the Holocaust is gradually revealed to the American government and people. Another plot thread concerns Aaron Jastrow's cousin Berel who is captured near the end of The Winds of War and is forced to join Kommando 1005, SS officer Paul Blobel's Jewish contingent that travels around Eastern Europe exhuming the bodies of massacred Jews and disposing of them in an effort to hide the evidence of Nazi mass murder.

=== Characters ===
==== The Henrys ====
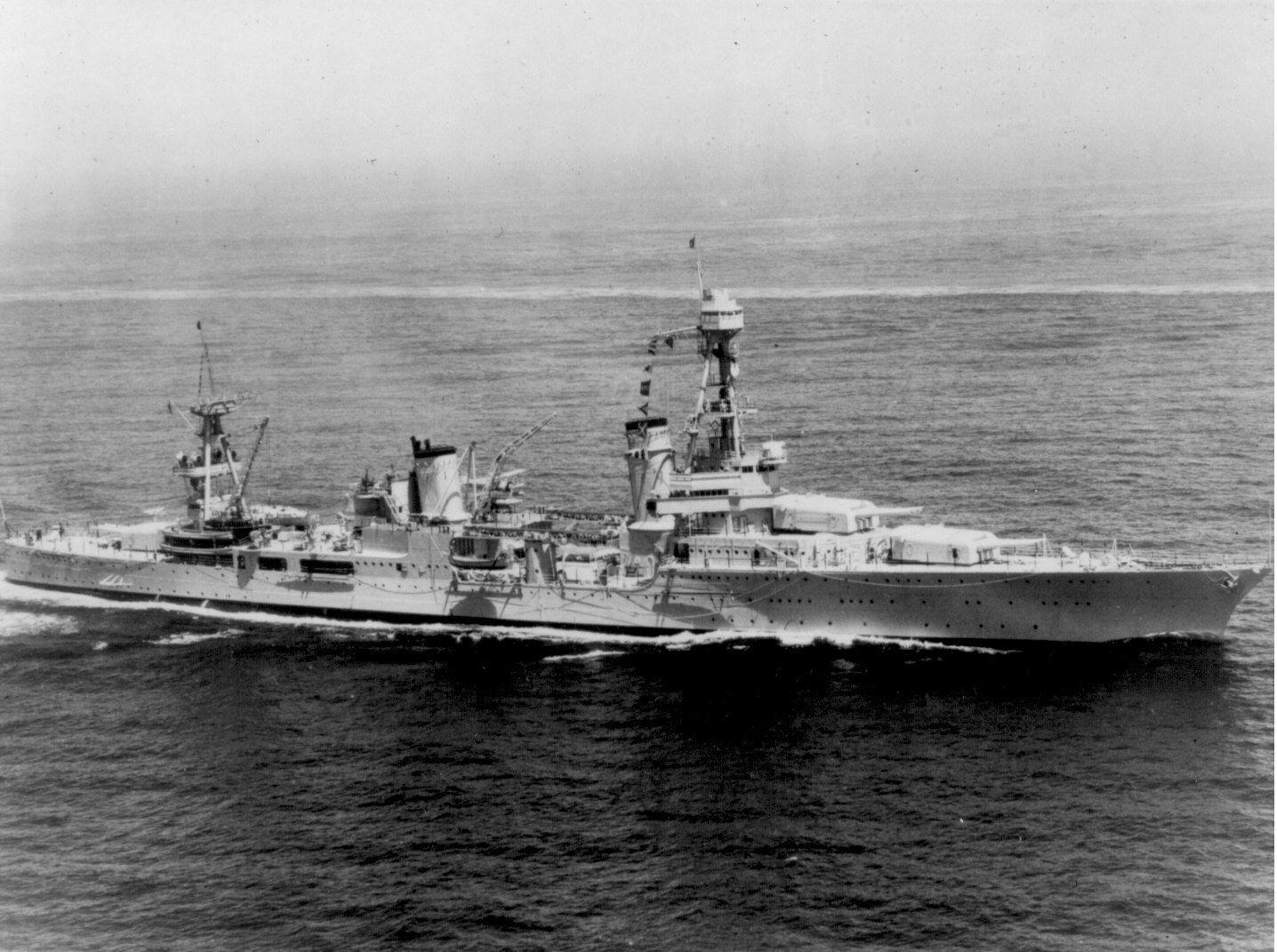
USS Northampton 1935.

- Victor "Pug" Henry – the main protagonist, becomes captain of the heavy cruiser USS Northampton after his prospective command, the battleship USS California, is sunk at Pearl Harbor. He commands the ship until late 1942, when at the Battle of Tassafaronga the cruiser is sunk by Japanese long-range torpedoes. Henry is not faulted for the loss of his ship, but instead of receiving another naval command at once, is sent back to the Soviet Union to observe the effects of Lend-Lease; he observes the Siege of Leningrad and the privation of the Soviet home front. From there, he is used by Harry Hopkins as an observer. In the novel, he assists in the Tehran Conference of 1943, and then serves as a troubleshooter for landing craft production. In this capacity, he travels to Oak Ridge, Tennessee, and is forced to work with Colonel Harrison (Hack) Peters, his rival for Rhoda's love.

Henry is promoted to rear admiral in early 1944. During this period, Rhoda obtains a divorce and Henry is able to marry Pamela. He does not do so until after he takes part in the Battle of Leyte Gulf as a battleship division commander with his flag in USS Iowa. He serves directly under Admiral William Halsey. The novel goes into this battle in greater detail than does the miniseries, including discussion of the most commonly perceived of Halsey's operational mistakes.

Victor marries Pamela in April 1945. Upon the death of President Roosevelt, President Harry S Truman makes him his naval aide.

Victor is a straightforward, honest man, which gains him the respect of political leaders such as Roosevelt and Hopkins, and the admiration of Hack Peters.

The novel notes that Henry retired from the Navy and lived in Oakton, Virginia (near Washington) after the war. He spent part of his retirement translating Armin von Roon's book, and from his notations and commentary, he can be deduced to still be alive as of 1973.

According to his notations and commentary of Roon's book, Henry retired as a vice admiral. However, there is no mention as to whether he was actually promoted to vice admiral and given a new assignment after his tenure as President Truman's naval aide prior to his retirement or if he was a "tombstone admiral". (Upon retirement, a flag officer is promoted 1 grade in rank if that officer received a commendation for their performance in combat. The flag officer will receive the retirement pay and benefits of the actual lower rank but is authorized to use the higher title in correspondence, on business cards, on their uniforms if they have a need to wear their old uniform, and—more to the point of the nickname—on their tombstones. This practice was abolished in 1959. In Pug's case he would receive the retirement pay and benefits of a rear admiral although he is called Vice Admiral.)

- Rhoda Henry – The war, and their time apart, puts a strain on Victor Henry's marriage to Rhoda. She ends her relationship with Palmer Kirby, only to fall in love with Harrison "Hack" Peters, an army colonel. Both the novel and the miniseries show her drinking problem getting worse.
- Warren Henry – Victor's elder son continues to serve as a naval pilot until his death on the last day of the Battle of Midway. He scored a hit on one of the Japanese carriers in the first day of the battle and his rear gunner damaged one Zero. His death affects the Henrys deeply. Victor's thoughts parallel the lament of King David for his son, Absalom.
- Byron Henry – Victor's younger son starts the war as an officer on the fictional submarine USS Devilfish. When the captain, Branch Hoban, breaks down under the strain of an attack, the executive officer, Carter "Lady" Aster takes over and leads the attack. Aster becomes commander of the boat, with Byron his executive officer. While on leave in Hawaii, Byron is aware that Janice, his brother's widow, is acting strangely. He does not know that she is having an affair with Aster.

Byron wants to see Natalie; when possible, he wangles duty in the European theater. He serves as a courier to the U.S. mission to Vichy France and tries to get Natalie to leave with him. She refuses on the grounds that while they were able to cross Poland in a war in 1939, they did not have Louis, their infant son, at the time. Byron and Natalie agree that Natalie and Louis and Aaron should wait to get a passport from the U.S. consulate in Marseille while Byron travels directly to Lisbon and books a room. Byron arrives in Portugal just as Operation Torch begins, and the plan has to be scrapped.

Byron returns to the Pacific theater and rejoins Aster on the fictional submarine USS Moray. Aster is severely wounded while on deck during an air attack and to save the boat, orders Byron to submerge without him. (This event is based on the death of Commander Howard W. Gilmore of the USS Growler (SS-215) on February 7, 1943. Gilmore was awarded the Medal of Honor). Byron is later awarded command of the USS Barracuda.

As a Naval Reservist, Byron has mixed feelings about his role in the war. He is competent, but doesn't enjoy fighting. However, in one engagement, he is forced to surface and fight a battle against a Japanese destroyer. When told he will win the Navy Cross, he replies, "Killing Japs gave Carter Aster a thrill. It leaves me cold."

Shortly before the Battle of Leyte Gulf, Byron visits his father aboard his flagship. The meeting is strained, because Byron blames Pamela for the breakup of his father's marriage. Later, his sister, Madeline, straightens him out about the causes of the breakup; he and his father reconcile.

In April 1945, Natalie is found in Weimar, Germany. Byron presses the Commander-in-Chief, Pacific, for an assignment in Europe so he might be reunited with his wife. He is assigned to investigate the technical details of captured German U-boats and leaves for Europe to join his wife, now recovering in a hospital, and to find his son, Louis. After a long search throughout Europe, Byron reunites with Louis, who was in an orphanage, only to find Louis is so traumatized he will not talk. However, when he reunites Louis with Natalie, Louis begins to sing with her. The reunion occurs on August 7, 1945, the day after the first use of the atomic bomb in warfare.

- Janice Henry – The wife of Warren Henry. After the death of Aster she disappears from the miniseries; aside from a line Pug says about her going into law school. In the book she is given a few sentences more. Janice ends up with a politician.
- Madeline Henry – Victor and Rhoda Henry's daughter; wife of Simon Anderson.

==== The Jastrows ====
- Aaron Jastrow – Aaron Jastrow is a Jewish American expatriate professor who has lived for years in Siena, Italy. As the book opens, Jastrow, his niece Natalie, and Natalie's son Louis are aboard a steamer in Naples, waiting to attempt the illegal and perilous sea voyage to Palestine. Then Jastrow meets a former student, Werner Beck, now in the German diplomatic corps. Beck offers them his protection, and they leave the ship to return to Jastrow's Siena villa, where it appears safe, although the Italian government refuses to give them visas, while making paper-thin excuses. Beck initially pretends sympathy and friendliness, so he can solicit Jastrow in broadcasting Axis propaganda. After Jastrow refuses, Beck makes veiled threats, so Jastrow, Natalie and Louis escape to Elba, then Corsica, and finally to Marseille, in Vichy France. After the Allied landings in Africa in November 1942, Germany occupies Vichy and closes the borders. Natalie, Louis and other trapped Americans are sent by the Vichy government first to Lourdes and then to Baden-Baden, Germany, to be part of a diplomatic exchange. Aaron falls ill and he and Natalie and Louis are transferred to Paris, where Jastrow is treated at the American Hospital. Beck reappears in Paris, again threateningly requesting that Jastrow make the propaganda broadcasts. Jastrow, Natalie and Louis attempt to flee back to Baden-Baden, but the Germans stop them and the three are soon after sent to Theresienstadt Ghetto. Adolf Eichmann has Jastrow savagely beaten after he refuses to join the so-called "Council of Elders". Jastrow acquiesces and takes a major role in the beautification, a Potemkin village to convince the Danish Red Cross that conditions are excellent in the "Paradise Camp." When his usefulness is ended, he is sent to Auschwitz. The Council members thought that as "prominents" they would be spared, but all were immediately sent to the gas chambers. Jastrow's body is cremated with millions of other Jews, but despite the degradation of his body, his soul was rekindled with what it means to be a Jew. He leaves behind a diary, A Jew's Journey, which is quoted throughout the book. Aaron hides his diary behind books in his library at Theresienstadt
- Berel Jastrow – Berel, Aaron's cousin, is captured with the Red Army in 1941 and sent to Auschwitz as a prisoner of war. He is transferred to a work kommando led by a Jew named Sammy Mutterperl, and the two participate in the construction of the Birkenau section of Auschwitz. Mutterperl himself is planning to escape with evidence of the murder of the Jews at Auschwitz. The kommando's task is to cover up the early massacres of Jews, and to ensure that Germany benefits from any items of value the victims were carrying during the early, "crude" killings; their actions involve digging up the corpses, searching them, then burning all traces of the bodies. After the horrors of endless exhuming of the dead, and cremating the half-decayed corpses, Sammy loses his mind, grabs a weapon and kills five German guards while they wait on a train platform, before the remaining guards kill him. Berel, shortly after, escapes and joins the Czech underground in Prague. He slips into Theresienstadt when he learns that his cousin Aaron and his niece Natalie are there, and later helps them get Louis Henry out of the camp. In the mini-series, Berel dies during a massacre as he covers Louis to protect him from the bullets. In the book, there is no definite description as to how Berel dies. At the end of the book, there is a suggestion that he is killed while coming to retrieve Louis Henry from the Czech farmer he originally hid him with. Berel is the moral center of War and Remembrance. He bears witness to the worst acts of the Nazis, while still managing to maintain his deep Jewish faith and his love for his fellow men.
- Natalie Jastrow Henry – along with her son and uncle, travels through various routes across Europe, trying to get home while evading the German government. She refuses a chance to escape with Byron to Lisbon (if caught she and Louis would be sent immediately to a concentration camp), then ends up in Theresienstadt. She becomes a member of the Zionist underground, and only when threatened with the cruel murder of Louis does she agree to take part in a beautification for the benefit of Red Cross inspectors. Her cousin, Berel Jastrow, enables Louis to get out of the ghetto. Natalie is sent to the Auschwitz concentration camp in the same transport as her uncle, but survives and is sent to recover in a U.S. military hospital. She and Byron reunite, and Byron then locates Louis and brings him to Natalie as the book ends. In the book it implies that Natalie and Louis, when she is well enough to travel, will return to the United States to live. In the mini-series it is not so clear-cut and in fact Avram Rabinovitz, an adamant Zionist who in the book pushed hard in most conversations for Natalie to bring Louis and live in Palestine either with or without Byron, tells Byron that Natalie was talking about moving to Palestine.(He says this in the book as well.)

==== Others ====
- Werner Beck – an officious little man whose main role was to seduce Aaron and Natalie into trusting him, then he sold them out.
- Leslie Slote – At the beginning of the war, Slote is attached to the U.S. Embassy in Switzerland. He receives a photographed copy of the Protocol for the Wannsee Conference from a German opponent of Hitler. Slote devotes himself to trying to prove to the American government what the Nazis are doing to the Jews but his superiors refuse to believe it, both on logistics and the idea any civilization could do something so monstrous. When the State Department proves to be apathetic, he resigns and becomes a member of the OSS Jedburgh paratroopers. He parachutes into France to help the resistance. He later infiltrates the German-held port of St Nazaire, but is betrayed and killed.
- Hugh Cleveland – Popular radio personality. Madeline Henry has become his personal assistant and, more recently, his lover by the time of the Pearl Harbor attack. He disappears from the novel and the miniseries shortly after the Battle of Midway, Madeline finally leaving him when she becomes convinced he will never divorce his wife. He also shows a pro-Soviet bias in the book and the miniseries which he did not in the first book or the first miniseries.
- Armin von Roon – The fictional Brigader General Armin von Roon serves as a member of the German OKW, in direct contact with the Fuehrer, and seeing the gradual deterioration of Hitler as the war goes worse for Germany. Von Roon flies from Berchtesgaden to Normandy to observe the German reaction to the Normandy invasion, but finds that Hitler rejects his observations. Von Roon is wounded in the July 20, 1944 attempt to assassinate Hitler; he walks with a cane for the remainder of the miniseries. Von Roon's character is sent on various fact-finding missions in the novels, and his memoirs serve as a useful dramatic device to explain facts to the reader.

In April 1945, von Roon is assigned the role of operations officer for the defense of the Zitadelle in the Battle of Berlin. Toward the end of the battle, he is ordered by Hitler to assist and oversee Albert Speer in a demolition effort intended as a scorched earth policy to destroy Berlin, leaving nothing for its conquerors. Both men, however, are unwilling to carry out the order, because of the effect it would have on future Germans. Speer eventually confesses that he disobeyed. Speer is pardoned for his earlier services, while von Roon is forgiven because he has been nothing but loyal. In the end von Roon has the duty to inform Adolf Hitler that the Zitadelle can hold only 24 hours more (in real life, von Roon's commander, General Krebs, did this); and he is a witness to Hitler's farewell, suicide, and cremation.

Von Roon is sentenced to 21 years in prison for war crimes (presumably by the Nuremberg tribunal) and writes Land, Sea, and Air Operations in World War II, which is translated (by Victor Henry) as World Holocaust. Von Roon presents the German viewpoint on events; Henry, as translator, provides a rebuttal when required.

- Harrison "Hack" Peters – Peters, a colonel in the Army, meets Rhoda Henry and falls in love with her. His work on the Manhattan Project coincidentally forces him to work with Victor Henry, who is vigorously pursuing the specialized parts needed to build landing craft for the assault on hostile beaches in Africa, Italy and France. Since Victor is aware of Peters' romance with Rhoda, it is a very strained relationship. Peters marries Rhoda in late 1944.
- Simon "Sime" Anderson – Anderson, a naval lieutenant, works on the atomic bomb at Los Alamos and marries Madeline Henry.
- Alistair Talcott "Talky" Tudsbury – Tudsbury is in Singapore when the Pacific war breaks out. He speaks about the possibility of the island falling in a subversive BBC broadcast, then leaves on the last boat. Tudsbury is killed by a landmine while on his way to interview then Lt. General Bernard Montgomery in the aftermath of the Battle of El Alamein. A fictional correspondent's report, Sunset at Kidney Ridge, reflects on the decline of the British Empire; it serves roughly as the emotional midpoint of the book.
- Pamela Tudsbury – serves as assistant to "Talky" Tudsbury (her father) until his death, then finishes his final report afterward. She is engaged to two men (RAF pilot Ted Gallard and Lord Burne-Wilke) during the war, but loves Victor Henry throughout and pursues him. Near the end of the war, they marry.
- Phil Rule – a dissolute British journalist and socialist; a former flame of Pamela Tudsbury. His main contribution is to provide a sarcastic commentary on the decline of the British Empire. Killed by a V-2 rocket in London.
- Air Vice-Marshal Lord Burne-Wilke – A career RAF officer, he becomes engaged to Pamela Tudsbury in 1942. Badly injured in a plane crash in India, he dies of pneumonia soon after she breaks off the engagement in 1944.
- Commander Jim Grigg – Victor Henry's executive officer on the cruiser Northampton.
- Yuri Yevlenko – Red Army general who lost a hand in the Battle of Moscow, he is assigned to liaise with Victor Henry over Lend-Lease material and deliveries. He and his daughter-in-law provide a commentary on the Siege of Leningrad.

==== Historical characters ====
- Adolf Hitler – As a speaking character, Hitler appears in the miniseries in a more prominent role than the novel.
- Erwin Rommel – Again, because of the requirements of television, Rommel plays a more prominent speaking role in the miniseries than in the novel. The story of Rommel's death becomes a dramatic element in the miniseries.
- Claus von Stauffenberg – The plot against Hitler, including von Stauffenberg's placing of a bomb, is more prominent in the miniseries than in the book, because of the visual drama.
- Adolf Eichmann – Eichmann appears in two sections of the novel and miniseries. In both cases, life for the Jastrows becomes worse. In the first, he orders Dr. Werner Beck, a German diplomat and Aaron Jastrow's former student, to figure out a way to convince the Italian authorities to deport Italian Jews into German control. In the second scene, he and a crony beat and bully Jastrow into accepting a position as a figurehead elder in Theresienstadt. An error in the miniseries is that Eichmann appears in November 1943 as a full SS-Colonel (SS-Standartenführer) when, in reality, Eichmann never rose above the rank of SS-Obersturmbannführer (Lieutenant Colonel).
- Rudolf Höss – SS Obersturmbannführer, the Auschwitz concentration camp commander.
- Franklin D. Roosevelt – President of the United States.
- Harry Hopkins – Hopkins, as a primary advisor to the president, carries out Roosevelt's grand policies.
- Winston Churchill – British Prime Minister.
- Dwight D. Eisenhower – General Eisenhower appears in the miniseries, and briefly toward the end of the novel, when he and Captain Henry discuss aspects of the Normandy landings.
- William Halsey – Admiral Halsey's operational mistakes late in the Pacific war are discussed.
- Harry Truman – Becomes President upon the death of Roosevelt. He appoints Victor Henry as his naval aide near the end of the movie.
- Ernest Lawrence – Nobel Prize winner involved in nuclear bomb development.
- Raymond A. Spruance – Although Frank Jack Fletcher was in overall command at the Battle of Midway, Spruance, in command of the task force containing Enterprise and Hornet, assumed command after Fletcher's flagship Yorktown was damaged; thus until recently, Spruance was generally credited with winning the battle. Although it is not covered in the book or the miniseries, Spruance went on to command at the Battle of the Philippine Sea in June 1944, the largest carrier battle in the war.
- Eugene Lindsey – Commander of Torpedo Squadron Six (flying off Enterprise); killed at the Battle of Midway.
- C. Wade McClusky – Air Group Six Commander at the Battle of Midway.
- Miles Browning – Chief of Staff to Admiral Spruance at the Midway Battle.
- Hussein Ala – Minister of the Imperial Court, Iran
- Paul Blobel – (SS Colonel) Designer of mass cremation apparatus designed to conceal Nazi atrocities, upon which Berel Jastrow worked while a slave laborer at Auschwitz and throughout Eastern Europe.

== Central message ==
Wouk concludes in the novel, "that war is an old habit of thought, an old frame of mind, an old political technique, that must now pass as human sacrifice and human slavery have passed. ... The beginning and the end of War lies in Remembrance." The novel's central message put more plainly by its primary character Victor Henry, after he experiences the Battles of Leyte Gulf, is "Either war is finished or we are". At the end of the novel, Wouk wrote that his purpose was to "bring the past to vivid life through the experiences, perceptions, and passions, of a few people caught in the war's maelstrom. This purpose was best served by scrupulous accuracy in locale and historical fact, as the background in which the invented drama would play".

== Critical response ==
One frequently cited criticism of the plot is that Wouk's repeated references to history take precedence over character development as well as the observations and ideas he offers to explain World War II in a larger context. As a result, the plot is occasionally too predictable, and Wouk seems at times to force the history to comply with his own observations about World War II and mankind. Larry Swindel noted that "there is deficient characterization throughout for any reader not already acquainted with the principals", and "the characters are reduced to pawns on the chessboard of history". Another critic noted that Wouk's personal commentary could have been better presented through his characters and that he should have been able to make his own observations about history through the structure of the novel itself. Nonetheless, it was felt that the book was an interesting, informative read, and that the reader could relate emotionally to the plight of the central characters. Wouk stated in a lecture which addressed the novel and the nature of warfare then and now, "The sadness is the present reality. ... I tell you now that I have no solutions. I will offer no facile optimism." Another critic noted that in regard to the novel's depiction of the Holocaust, that it may be a serious "trivialization of history to employ old fashioned tricks of plotting, such as the chapter-ending cliffhanger, in dramatizing such grave events".

Perhaps the most significant critical praise of the book and its prequel, The Winds of War, is that Wouk used the tools of the novel to identify the psychological mechanisms and rationalizations that allowed intelligent, well-meaning individuals to fail to take needed action to forestall the rise of Hitler's Germany, the ensuing war and the resulting holocaust.

== Television adaptation ==
The novel was adapted into a television mini-series and presented on American television in from November 13, 1988, to May 14, 1989. Wouk was a screenwriter for the miniseries as well as being author of the book. The miniseries covered the period of World War II from the American entry into World War II immediately after Pearl Harbor in December 1941 to the day after the bombing of the Japanese city of Hiroshima. War and Remembrance received 15 Emmy Award nominations, including best actor, actress, and supporting actress, and won for best miniseries, special effects, and single-camera production editing. It also won three Golden Globes.

== See also ==
- The Winds of War
