= The Lawgiver =

2012 novel by Herman Wouk

- First edition cover
- Author: Herman Wouk
- Language: English
- Publisher: Simon & Schuster
- Publication date: November 13, 2012
- Publication place: United States
- Media type: Print (Hardcover)
- Pages: 240
- ISBN: 978-1451699388

The Lawgiver is a 2012 novel by Herman Wouk depicting a fictional attempt to make a film about the biblical Moses. It is an epistolary novel, composed of traditional communications such as letters, memos, and articles, as well as utilizing more contemporary means like e-mails, text messages, and Skype transcripts.
