= Logan's Run (disambiguation) =

Logan's Run is a 1967 novel.

Logan's Run may also refer to:

- Logan's Run (film), a 1976 science fiction film based on the novel
- Logan's Run (TV series), a science fiction television series, a spin-off from the film
- Logan's Run (game), a play-by-mail role-playing game based on the novel
- "Logan's Run" (song), a song by Babyland

== See also ==
- Logan Run, a tributary of the Susquehanna River
