= Alias Enterprises =

American comic book publishing company

- Type: Private
- Genre: Comics
- Founded: 2005
- Founder: Brett Burner and Mike S. Miller
- Headquarters: San Diego, California, United States
- Website: www.aliasenterprises.com

Alias Enterprises is an American publishing company. Their main divisions are Alias Comics (all-ages comic books) and Cross Culture (Christian comic books). Based in San Diego, California, it was founded in January 2005 by Brett Burner and Mike S. Miller. They publish comics such as Lullaby, The 10th Muse, The Legend of Isis, and Sixgun Samurai.

== History ==
Alias was founded by artist Mike S. Miller and publisher Brett Burner (also owner of Lamp Post Publications). In January 2005, they launched their first productions through Image Comics filling a virtually untapped market with three all-ages titles: Lullaby: Wisdom Seeker, Lions, Tigers and Bears, and The Imaginaries. All three were successful projects in the independent marketplace, particularly Lullaby, which has seen continuing success since its initial release. Also in 2005, Alias expanded into a self-publishing company with plans to launch 12 titles in April of that year with cover prices of 75 cents. The titles all shipped late and were released irregularly afterwards, but landed them a spot with Diamond Comic Distributors as a Top 20 Publisher.

Alias Comics offered 25-cent preview issues, 75-cent introductory issues, and 50,000 copies of free (to retailer) preview books called "the Comic Book Digest" as marketing efforts, but continued to have problems with shipping. In mid-2005, Alias chose to move its comic printing stateside, but due to the accumulation of problems at the domestic printer, it decided to go back to its original partner in South Korea. The subsequent lapse in shipping, going from a domestic printer to a South Korean printer, resulted in a two- to three-month lapse in delivery of Alias comic books to comic stores. Being gone from the shelves for so long created several problems for the fledgling company, causing a loss of retailer and consumer confidence.

Nearly a year after opening their doors, several Alias comic book creators began to leave the publisher, citing various concerns. In 2005, studios Monkey Pharmacy, Runemaster Studios, and Dabel Brothers Productions stopped producing books for publication by Alias. In November, Alias underwent a restructuring plan. Its publisher, Brett Burner, purchased majority shares of the company in order to take control of the company's financial records.

In March 2006, Alias began to shift to a new policy toward its creators requiring work to be completed and in-hand before being solicited for publication, as an effort to maintain a more exact release schedule. Later, Alias signed an agreement with Christian publisher Zondervan to produce 24 manga or graphic novels to be released over the next few years through its Cross Culture division, consisting of three 8-book series. These titles included Hand of the Morningstar, Kingdoms, and The Manga Bible.

Also in 2006, Alias' Christian division, Cross Culture Entertainment, began publication of Bubblemag, a Christian pop culture magazine. By the fall of 2006, Alias Comics was rebranded as a Christian comic company. Within a few weeks, Abacus Comics opened for business. Abacus Comics is owned solely by Miller, and was opened for the express purpose of publishing several of his "creator-owned" titles which were initially run through Alias Comics.

In 2007, Lamp Post Inc. obtained full rights to all Alias and Cross Culture properties, placing them under its label.

== Publications ==
In alphabetical order:

- ArmorQuest: Genesis (2005–2006) by Ben Avery and Sherwin Schwartzrock
- Atomik Mike (2006) by Stephan Nilson
- The Blackbeard Legacy (2006–2007)
- Chrono Mechanics (2006) by Art Thibert and Richard Birdsall
- David: The Sheperd's Song (2005) by Royden Lepp
- David's Mighty Men (2005) by Javier Saltares
- Deal with the Devil (2005) by Mike S. Miller and Sherwin Schwartzrock
- The Devil's Keeper (2005) by Mike S. Miller, Sean Jordan, and Carlos Paul
- The Dreamland Chronicles (2005–2017) by Scott Christian Sava
- The Hammer Kid (2006) by Kevin Grevioux
- Hyper-Actives (2005–2006) by Darin Wagner and Clint Hilinski
- Judo Girl (2005–2006) by Darren G. Davis, Terrance Griep, and Nadir Balan
- Killer Stunts, Inc. (2005) by Scott Kinney
- Legacy Manga Digest (2005) by Carmen Trifilleti and Eduardo Francisco
- The Legend of Isis (2005–2006) by Ryan Scott Ottney, Darren G. Davis, et al.
- Lethal Instinct (2005)
- Lullaby vol. 2 (2005–2006) by Mike S. Miller and Hector Sevilla
- Monkey in a Wagon vs. Lemur on a Big Wheel (2005) by Ken Lillie-Paetz and Chris Moreno
- Opposite Forces vol. 2 (2005) by Tom Bancroft
- Orion the Hunter (2006)
- OZF5 (2005) by Ramon Madrigal and Ryan Ottley
- Pakkins' Land vol. 2 (2005) by Gary Shipman
- Psi-Kix (2005)
- Revere (2006) by Ed Lavallee and Grant Bond
- Sixgun Samurai (2005–2006) by Mike S. Miller, Sean Jordan, and Harold Edge
- Super Teen*Topia (2006) by Kirk Kushin
- Ted Noodleman: Bicycle Delivery Boy (2005) by Jim Keplinger and Ryan Ottley
- Tenth Muse vol. 3 (2005–2006) by Darren G. Davis, et al.
- TwinBlades (2006) by Adrian Todd and Ryan Odagawa
- Valkyries (2006) by Kevin Grevioux
- Victoria's Secret Service (2005) by Darren G. Davis and Nadir Balan
- Yenny vol. 2 (2005–2006) by David Álvarez

Comics that went to other venues after publication at Alias:

- Monkey in a Wagon vs. Lemur on a Big Wheel (went to Silent Devil Productions)
- Elsinore (went to Devil's Due Publishing)
- Lions, Tigers and Bears (went to Image Comics)
- XIII (uncensored trade paperbacks by Dabel Brothers Productions)

Comics that came to Alias after initial publication at another venue:

- Chrono Mechanics (came from Image Comics)

Cancelled Alias comics:

- The Gimoles

== Circulation ==
According to the sales estimates from industry resource site ICv2, Alias' top-selling monthly comics for their first year were:

- May 2005: 4,945 copies (rank 188) of 10th Muse vol. 2, #1
- June 2005: 7,836 copies (rank 214) of Lethal Instinct #1
- July 2005: 4,005 copies (rank 203) of Legend of Isis #2
- August 2005: 3,546 copies (rank 242) of Legend of Isis #3
- September 2005: 3,286 copies (rank 222) of XIII #2
- October 2005: 3,352 copies (rank 243) of Legend of Isis #4
- November 2005: 7,432 copies (rank 195) of Lullaby #1
- December 2005: 3,038 copies (rank 251) of Legend of Isis #7
- January 2006: 3,886 copies (rank 208) of Lullaby #2
- February 2006: -- no issue shipped, only a TPB
- March 2006: 3,909 copies (rank 261) of Victoria's Secret Service #1
- April 2006: 4,701 copies (rank 210) of Lullaby #3
- May 2006: 2,959 copies (rank 291) of Blackbeard Legacy #1

NOTE: These are only initial pre-order sales via Diamond Comic Distributors U.S. and do not include possible reorders or sales through other channels.
