= Dale Keown =

Canadian comic book artist (born 1962)

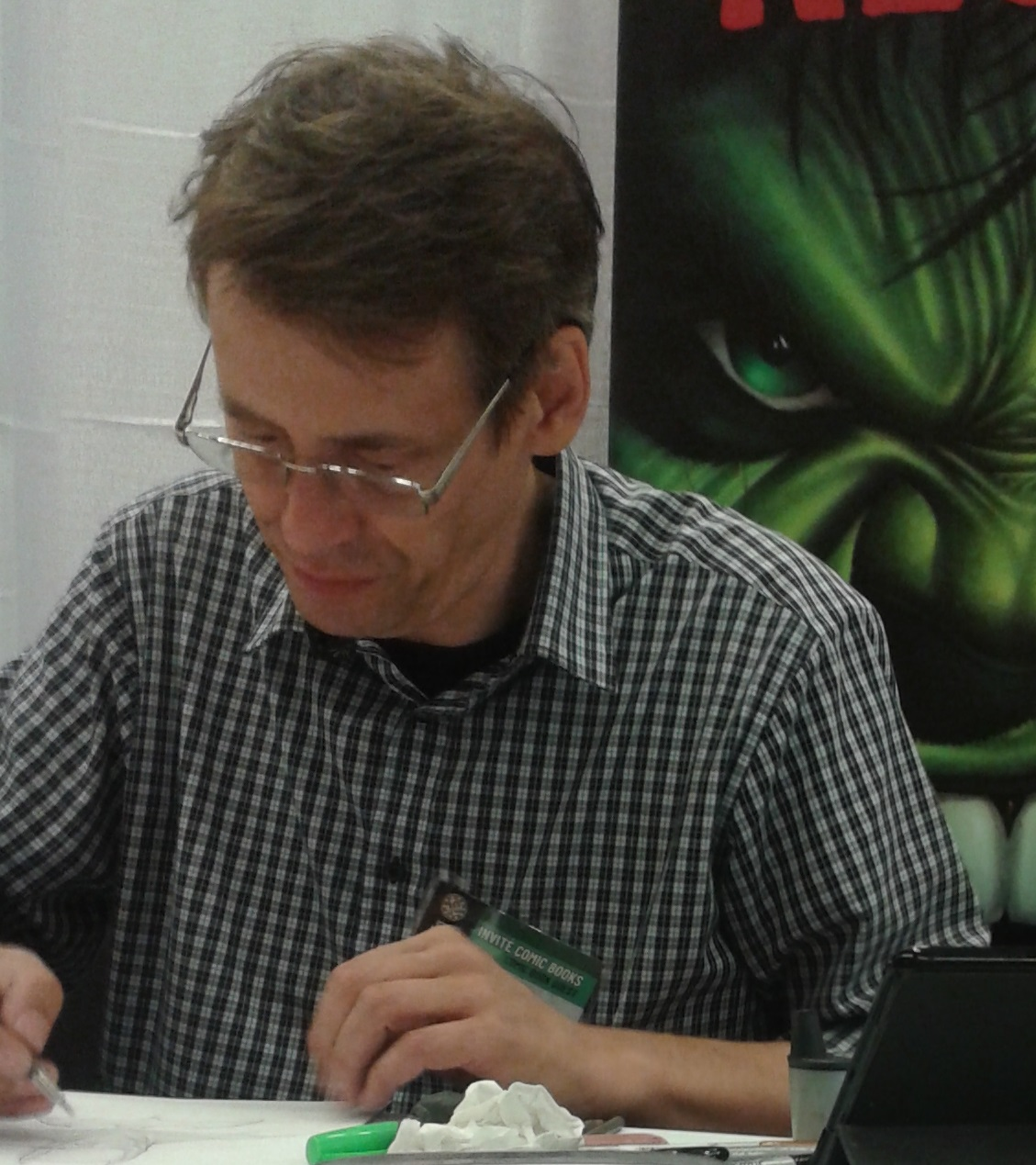
- Born: July 23, 1962 (age 64) Grande Prairie, Alberta
- Areas: Writer, Penciller, Artist, Inker
- Notable works: The Darkness; The Incredible Hulk; Pitt

Dale Keown (/ˈkiːoʊn/; born July 23, 1962) is a Canadian comic book artist known for his runs on The Incredible Hulk and his creator-owned comic book Pitt.

== Career ==
Keown started working in comics in 1986 drawing several series for Aircel Comics, including Samurai, Elflord, Dragon Ring (later Dragonforce), and Warlock 5.

Keown moved to Marvel Comics in 1989, where he first worked on Nth Man: the Ultimate Ninja, before replacing Jeff Purves on The Incredible Hulk. Keown worked on Hulk with writer Peter David, creating one of the more memorable runs of the book. David has named Keown one of the three artists whose art has mostly closely matched the visuals he conceived when writing a comic book scripts (the others being George Pérez and Leonard Kirk).

He left in 1993, to start publishing his self-created Pitt at Image Comics. Keown was originally offered "founder" status at Image after Whilce Portacio withdrew to deal with his sister's illness but declined due to having a criminal record making traveling outside of Canada difficult. In 1995, publication of Pitt was moved over to Keown's own company, Full Bleed Studios.

He eventually began working for other companies once more, drawing The Darkness for Top Cow and teaming up with Peter David once more with Hulk: The End for Marvel. Keown also drew a crossover featuring The Darkness and the Hulk.

Keown drew many of the pictures for the Hulk memorabilia that was released to coincide with the 2003 feature film Hulk.

In 2009 Keown illustrated the three-issue crossover of The Darkness / Pitt, which was written by Paul Jenkins. It was preceded by a special preview book released in December 2006.

Keown worked with Milo Ventimiglia on Top Cow Productions' Berserker, which premiered June 2009.

== Bibliography ==
=== Aircel Publishing ===
- Dragonforce #1-12 (1988–89) -from #5 it was published by Malibu Comics-
- Dragonring #9-15 (1987–88)
- Samurai #13-16 (full art); #23 (among other artists) (1986–87)
- Warlock 5 #16-17 (1988)

=== DC ===
- Superman, vol. 2, #170 (2001)

=== Image ===
- Darkness, vol. 2, #1-6 (2002)
- The Darkness/Pitt #1-3 (2009)
- Pitt #1-20 (1993–99) -from #10 it was published by Full Bleed Studios-
- Tomb Raider: Journeys (Darkness) #8 (2002)
- Youngblood (Pitt) #4 (1993)

=== Marvel ===
- Incredible Hulk #367, 369-377, 379, 381-388, 390-393, 395-398 (1990-1992)
- Hulk: The End, one-shot (2002)
- Incredible Hulk: Last Call #1 (2019)
- Maestro (Vol. 1) #1-3, 5 (2020)
- Giant-Size Hulk #1 (2006)
- Avengers (Vol. 5) #34.1 (2014)
- Avengers (Vol. 8) #26, 39 (2019-2020)
- Heroes Reborn (Vol. 2) #2 (2021)
- Nth Man (Vol. 1) #8 (1990)

=== Image/Marvel ===
- Hulk/Pitt, one-shot (1996)
- The Darkness/Hulk, one-shot (2004)

Preceded by Jeff Purves	The Incredible Hulk artist 1990–1992	Succeeded by Jan Duursema
