= TidalWave Productions =

Comic book publisher

- Type: Entertainment Publications
- Industry: Comics
- Founded: 2007 by Darren G. Davis
- Headquarters: Portland, Oregon
- Key people: Darren G. Davis
- Website: tidalwavecomics.com

TidalWave Productions (previously known as Bluewater Productions, StormFront Media/Publishing & Storm Entertainment) is an independent production studio of comic books and graphic novels. Based in Portland, Oregon, United States, Bluewater publishes biographical comics, adaptations from films, and original titles with self-created characters.

== History ==
The first iteration of Davis's company started in 2001 as a production studio at Image Comics, where its founder Darren G. Davis developed the company's signature series 10th Muse and The Legend of Isis. This iteration came to an end with the company declared bankrupt in 2003.

Davis's revived company, then known as Bluewater Productions, became a publisher in May 2007 with the signature series Ray Harryhausen Presents, which was produced in conjunction with filmmaker Ray Harryhausen until 2009. Other signature series, including Vincent Price Presents, produced in conjunction with the daughter of the actor Vincent Price, and William Shatner Presents, with actor William Shatner, followed.

The company signed a deal, in 2009, to republish the Rock 'N' Roll Comics series from defunct publisher Revolutionary Comics. The deal ended in 2013 after seven volumes with an eighth left un-published.

In 2011, Bluewater began a collaboration with The Graphic Classroom, which resulted in the creation of free lesson plans to tie-in with the company's series of biographical comics.

Bluewater became a pioneer in digital-first publishing in January 2012, with the release of its Gabby Giffords and Mitt Romney bio-comics on the Nook and Kindle prior to their print versions.

Bluewater ended its distribution deal with Diamond Comic Distributors in 2012 after several of their titles were canceled for not meeting the sales benchmarks. Distribution was taken over by Comic Flea Market, which operates a print-on-demand service. Following this Arcana Studio bought up the majority of the company's non-biographical original content, including 10th Muse and Legend of Isis.

A name change to StormFront Media/Publishing in 2015 followed a television production deal for their property Insane Jane which required the company to differentiate itself from another production company of the same name. A second name change to Storm Entertainment later that year was undertaken in order to end any confusion of the company with the controversial Stormfront message forum. This rebranding coincided with a change to a digital-centric business plan.

The company regained its original name TidalWave Productions in 2016 and has been publishing through Ingram and various other distributors. They produced titles such as Female Force, Stormy Daniels: Space Force, Force of the Trojans, Soldier of Fortune, Juliet, Dorian Gray, Political Power and others. They are represented by The Bohemia Group in Los Angeles.

== Darren G. Davis titles ==
=== 10th Muse ===
Developed by founder Darren Davis, 10th Muse follows the adventures of the forgotten tenth muse of ancient Greece reincarnated in the body of ordinary present-day girl Emma Sonnet. 10th Muse was the sixth highest selling comic in November 2001.

10th Muse has been optioned for film and television several times, first in 2002. CastleBright Entertainment acquired the film option in 2007. In 2011 Vanquish Motion Pictures commissioned a television pilot of 10th Muse penned by Jennifer Quintenez.

=== Legend of Isis ===
Legend of Isis follows the adventures of the Egyptian goddess Isis as she adjusts to life in 21st century Los Angeles following 5,000 years of imprisonment. With the help of her new friends Scott Dean and Crystal Van Howe, Isis fights evil and holds down a day job working in a museum. Isis's primary weapon, the mystical staff of Luxor, channels the power of Osiris, her lost love.

The Legend of Isis was optioned in 2004 as a motion picture by Paramount Pictures and Grammnet Productions.

=== Other titles ===
- Orion the Hunter
- Judo-Girl
- The Blackbeard Legacy
- Victoria's Secret Service (VSS)
- The Mis-Adventures of Adam West

== Ray Harryhausen Signature Series ==
The Ray Harryhausen Signature Series is a series of authorised comic book adaptions of unrealised projects developed by filmmaker Ray Harryhausen which ran for two years, from 2007 to 2009. Darren G. Davis stated that Harryhausen, who was in the process of retiring when the series began, had little creative involvement in the project. The collaboration ended in 2009, with no plans to move the series to another publisher.

=== Wrath of the Titans ===
Matt Frank cover

Wrath of the Titans is a 2007 four-issue comic book miniseries created by Darren G. Davis, Scott Davis, Nadir Balan and Jason Metcalf based on ideas developed by Ray Harryhausen in 1984 as a sequel to Clash of the Titans (1981). In the story, set five years after the events of the film, the presumed-dead Calibos escapes from the Underworld to take his revenge on Perseus and his new family.

A 1:6 scale figure of Perseus with Bubo from the comics was released by Go Hero in 2008.

Wrath of the Titans: Eye of the Monster (a.k.a. Wrath of the Titans: Cyclops) is a 2009 one-shot comic book created by Matt Frank. The story, which is a prequel to the 1958 film The 7th Voyage of Sinbad, reveals how the cyclops acquired the magical lamp that it kept in its treasure cave on the island of Colossa before it was stolen from the cave by the wizard Sokurah.

Wrath of the Titans: Revenge of Medusa is a 2011 four-issue comic book miniseries created by Darren G. Davis, Scott Davis and Jaime Martinez Rodriguez. In the story, Perseus is forced to match wits and armies with the Olympians.

A licensing agreement with Warner Bros. allowed them to use the title for their film Wrath of the Titans (2012).

Wrath of the Titans: Cyclops is a 2012 graphic novel created by C.W. Cooke and Ramon Salas aimed at juvenile readers.

Wrath of the Titans: Force of the Trojans is a proposed four-issue comic book miniseries (of which only two issues so far have been released in the early 2010s) created by Chad Jones and Damian Graff. In the story, Apollo and Artemis must rescue Pythia from a dragon. A trade paperback edition of the comic was released in March 2021.

A radio dramatization of the original miniseries, produced by Colonial Radio Theater for SiriusXM, and a novelization called Wrath of the Titans: Battle for Argos, adapted by John Garavaglia from a script written by Ali Russell, were both released in 2013.

=== 20 Million Miles More ===
20 Million Miles More is a 2007 four-issue comic book miniseries created by Scott Davis and Alex Garcia based on ideas developed by Ray Harryhausen in his film 20 Million Miles to Earth (1957). In the story, set 50 years after the events of the film, the crewed mission to Venus and the attack on Rome by the Ymir have long been dismissed as a hoax.

As part of a publicity campaign for the comic, a preview of the first issue was included on the 50th Anniversary DVD release of the film.

=== It Came from Beneath the Sea... Again! ===
It Came from Beneath the Sea... Again! is a 2007 (delayed until 2011) four-issue comic book miniseries created by Clay Griffith, Susan Griffith, Chris Noeth and Todd Tennant, based on ideas developed by Ray Harryhausen in his film It Came from Beneath the Sea (1955).

The story by Griffith and Griffith is described by Jake Thomas, writing for Fanbase Press, as "well-paced" and wasting "no time getting to the action", while James Ferguson, writing for Horror DNA, compliments the "outrageous and always funny" dialogue. The artwork by Noeth in the first two chapters is complimented by Thomas as "highly illustrated, bright, and bold", while dismissed by Ferguson as "very uneven", which he puts down to tight deadlines. The artwork by Tennant in the final two chapters is described by Thomas as "heavy-textured, almost photo-realistic panels", while Ferguson compliments the "insane" action shots despite the lazy shortcuts taken.

As part of a publicity campaign for the comic, a preview of the first issue was included on the 50th Anniversary DVD release of the film.

=== Sinbad: Rogue of Mars ===
Sinbad: Rogue of Mars is a 2007 four-issue comic book miniseries created by Greg Thompson, Scott Davis, Jeff Cruz and Kiatisak Piewkao based on ideas developed by Ray Harryhausen in 1981 as a continuation of his Sinbad the Sailor film series, which would have been titled Sinbad Goes to Mars, and had previously included The 7th Voyage of Sinbad (1958), The Golden Voyage of Sinbad (1973) and Sinbad and the Eye of the Tiger (1977).

A 1:6 scale figure of Sinbad from the comics was released by Go Hero in 2008.

Morningside Entertainment, the production company behind the original series of films, optioned the miniseries for adaptation into a fourth entry in the feature film series in 2011. The project was to be executive produced by Barry Schneer, nephew of original series producer Charles H. Schneer, and written by Paul J. Salamoff. A preview poster announcing a 2012 release date for the film was issued, but this was not met.

A novelisation of the miniseries, adapted by John Garavaglia, was released in 2013.

Sinbad the Sailor is also featured in the unrelated Sinbad and the Merchant of Ages (2016) by Adam Gragg and Giampiero Wallnofer.

=== Ray Harryhausen Presents... ===
Ray Harryhausen Presents... is a 2007 comic book one-shot special which includes short stories and ideas developed by Ray Harryhausen in his early fairy tale animations, as well as previews and bonus materials of other titles in the signature series.

- Introducing: The Baron Munchausen and his Unusual Companions by Adam David Gragg & Azim
- Hansel and Gretel by Emma Davis & Zack Rose
- The Tortoise and the Hare by Jason Schultz & Brian Hess

=== Jason & the Argonauts ===
Jason & the Argonauts: The Kingdom of Hades is a 2007 five-issue comic book miniseries created by David A. McIntee and Rantz based on ideas developed by Ray Harryhausen in his film Jason and the Argonauts (1963).

A 1:6 scale figure of the Skeleton Warrior from the comics was released by Go Hero in 2008.

The miniseries was followed by Jason & the Argonauts: Final Chorus (2014).

=== Flying Saucers vs. the Earth ===
Flying Saucers vs. the Earth is a 2008 four-issue comic book miniseries created by Ryan Burton and Alan Brooks based on ideas developed by Ray Harryhausen in his film Earth vs. the Flying Saucers (1956). In the story, the events of the film are re-imagined from the perspective of the alien invaders, identified here as the Sons of Aberrann.

As part of a publicity campaign for the comic, a preview of the first issue was included on the 50th Anniversary DVD release of the film.

=== Back to Mysterious Island ===
Back to Mysterious Island is a 2008 four-issue comic book miniseries created by Max Landis and Kevin Gentilcore based on ideas developed by Ray Harryhausen in his film Mysterious Island (1961). In the story, which features an entirely original primary cast, a pair of zoologists, surveying penguins on a rogue iceberg, accidentally rediscover the titular island.

=== War of the Elementals ===
War of the Elementals is a 2008 four-issue comic book miniseries created by Scott Davis and Sebastian Piriz based on ideas developed by Ray Harryhausen in 1952 for an unrealized film project called The Elementals.

A radio dramatization of the miniseries, produced by Colonial Radio Theater for SiriusXM, was released in 2016.

=== The Pit and the Pendulum ===
The Pit and the Pendulum is a 2009 comic book adaptation by Marc Lougee and Susan Ma of the award-winning 2007 stop-motion short executive produced by Ray Harryhausen, based on the story of the same name by Edgar Allan Poe.

== Vincent Price Signature Series ==
The Vincent Price Signature Series is a series of authorised by the estate of Vincent Price.

=== Vincent Price Presents ===
Jim McDermott cover

Vincent Price Presents is a 2008-2011 ongoing comic book series which ran for 37 issues. The stories feature retellings of his films and original tales.

=== Other titles ===
- Vincent Price Presents: Gallery of Terror (2009)
- Vincent Price Presents: The Tingler (2009)
- Vincent Price: His Life Story (2011)
- Vincent Price Presents: Tales from the Darkness (2012)
- Vincent Price: House of Horrors (2012)

== William F. Nolan titles ==
A series of comic book titles based on Logan's Run was created in 2010 in collaboration with co-creator William F. Nolan. Nolan has stated that part of his reason for making this deal was to encourage Warner Bros. to progress their long delayed plans to reboot the Logan's Run film franchise.

=== Logan's Run ===
Logan's Run: The Last Day is a 2010-2011 six-issue comic book miniseries created by Paul J. Salamoff, in collaboration with William F. Nolan and Jason V. Brock, and Daniel Gete, which re-imagines the popular franchise created by Nolan and George Clayton Johnson. The story draws on elements from the first novel Logan's Run and some elements from the second novel Logan's World.

The writing by Salamoff is described by Jamie Trecker, writing for Newsarama, as "pretty taut and immersive", resulting in "a speedy yet satisfying read". The art by Daniel Gete is described by Trecker as "serviceable" and "crisp".

A radio dramatization of the miniseries, produced by Colonial Radio Theater for SiriusXM was released in 2011.

Logan's Run: Aftermath is a 2011 six-issue comic book miniseries created by Paul J. Salamoff, Philip Simpson, Mike Dorman, Carsten Biernat and Angel Bernuy. In the story, which draws on elements from the second novel Logan's World, Logan returns to action when Jessica and his son Jaq find themselves in danger.

A radio dramatization of the miniseries, produced by Colonial Radio Theater for SiriusXM was released in 2012.

Logan's Run: Rebirth is a 2012-2013 four-issue comic book miniseries created by Paul J. Salamoff, William F. Nolan, Cesare Tatarelli, V. Kenneth Marion and Jayfri Hashim.

Logan's Run: Solo is a 2013 one-shot comic book special created by William F. Nolan, Jason V. Brock and Marcelo Da Silva.

Logan's Run: Blackflower is a 2017 comic book miniseries created by William F. Nolan, Scott Davis and Nick Diaz.

=== Tales from William F. Nolan's Dark Universe ===
Tales from William F. Nolan's Dark Universe is a 2011-2013 five-issue comic book miniseries created by William F. Nolan and Jason V. Brock.

== Other titles ==
=== The Wave ===
In 2011, Gregg Paulson and AE Stueve launched The Wave, the first shared universe in Bluewater Productions history. This multi-part, creator-owned miniseries revolves around the adventures of characters from Greek mythology in modern times. The Wave #0 explores what happens to Greek gods Artemis, Zeus, Poseidon and Persephone when mankind ceases to worship them. The line also follows mythological figures Heracles and Orion, as well as Bluewater original characters from 10th Muse, The Legend of Isis and Atlas. Stueve and Paulson cite the films of Ray Harryhausen and mythic archetypes of Joseph Campbell as major influences. Other titles in the series include Artemis, Orion, Heracles, Trident: The Power of Poseidon, and Twilight of the Gods.

=== Other titles ===
- 10th Muse
- 1782: The Year of Blood #1 (December 2008)
- 47 Decembers
- Atlas
- Anne of Green Gables
- Ares: Goddess of War
- Baneberry Creek Academy for Wayward Fairies
- Bartholomew of the Scissors #1—4 (September—December 2008)
- Battle Amongst the Stars #1—3 (March—May 2010)
- The Fabulous Beekman Boys: Polka Spot
- Camelot #1 (December 2007)
- The Claw and Fang #1—4 (April 2010—April 2011)
- Curse of the Mumy
- Dead End Boys
- The Deathsport Games #1—3 (November 2010—January 2011)
- Dirk Benedict in the 25th Century
- Distortions Unlimited #1—2 (December 2009—January 2011)
- Evel Knievel (announced in 2013, to be released)
- Dorian Gray
- Fantasy World of Bettie Page
- Femme Fatale: Eartha Kitt
- The Final Death Race
- Fleischer
- George Clayton Johnson's A Touch of Strange
- Gearz #1—4 (June—September 2008)
- The Humanoids #1 (October 2010)
- Hyde Park
- Infamous Charlie Sheen #1 (July 2011)
- Insane Jane #1—4 (March—June 2008)
- Jesus Christ: The Faith Series #1 (April 2010)
- Judo Girl: So You Wanna Revolution #1—3 (February—April 2011)
- Leprechaun #1—4 (May—August 2009)
- Lost Raven (January 2006, graphic novel)
- Les Storud's Survivorman
- Mike Miller's The Imaginaries
- Monsters Among Us
- Missile to the Moon #1 (January 2009)
- Myth Adventures of the Muses
- Nanny and Hank #1—4 (August—October 2010)
- Orion the Hunter Giant-Sized #1 (January 2008)
- Paparazzi #1—3 (March—June 2011)
- Pistolfist, Revolutionary Warrior #1—4 (July—October 2008)
- Plan 9 from Outer Space Strikes Again! #1 (March 2009)
- Quartermain
- Rain #1 (July 2011)
- Ret Romanne #1 (August 2008)
- Ruth and Freddy
- Secret Lives of Julie Newmar
- Sherlock Holmes: Victorian Knights #1—2 (December 2011—January 2012)
- Shi vs. 10th Muse #1 (June 2007)
- Spaced Out
- Styx and Stone #1—4 (December 2010—March 2011)
- Tiger & Crane #1—3 (February—August 2008)
- Tom Corbett, Space Cadet #1—4 (September—December 2009)
- Tony and Cleo #1—4 (July—October 2010)
- Venus #1 (October 2007)
- Violet Rose #1—2 (November 2007—June 2008)
- Warlock #1—4 (March—June 2009)
- Walter Koenig's Things to Come #1—2 (September—October 2011)
- William Shatner Presents: Man O'War #1 (January 2012)
- William Shatner Presents: Quest for Tomorrow #1 (September 2009)
- William Shatner Presents: The Tek War Chronicles #1—8 (June—December 2009)

== Biographical comic books ==
In 2009, the company ventured into biographical comics with Female Force, a series celebrating influential women in society and popular culture. In the subsequent years, Bluewater Productions has filled the growing biography comics niche with other titles profiling popular figures in politics (Political Power), entertainment (Fame), literature, and others. Less than half of Bluewater Productions publications are biography. Bluewater Productions wanted to utilize the "power of celebrity" to broaden comics distribution. Fame: Justin Bieber was initially distributed exclusively at WalMart stores.

Although many biographical comics are unauthorized, the company wanted to contact most of its subjects to participate. In 2010, the publication of Female Force: Charlaine Harris marked the first authorized Female Force biography. Harris granted interviews to writer Kim Sherman. When requested, Bluewater has donated profits made off the biography comics to charities of the subject's choice, as was the case with FAME: Ellen DeGeneres. There was a criticism regarding a potentially exploitative nature of biography comics. Responses from Bluewater Productions highlight positive aspects of potentially expanding comics readership. Furthermore, the company defends its right to provide timely coverage that its audience demands. According to Davis, speaking about the then-upcoming Infamous: Charlie Sheen comic, "there are those who are going to complain that we are exploiting Sheen. But honestly, this is no different than People magazine devoting most of an issue to the story or TMZ or Slate or the general media's constant coverage of breaking developments. If Sheen contacted us right now and wanted us to donate some of the potential profits to a charity of his choosing, we would happily do so".

In addition to Female Force, the company publishes the biography comic lines Political Power (Hillary Clinton, Michelle Obama, Oprah Winfrey...), Fame (50 cent, Adele, Beyonce, Black Eyed Peas...), about famous authors (Anne Rice, JK Rowling, Neil Gaiman, Stephen King, Stephenie Meyer...) and others.

In 2009, Bluewater began to reprint defunct publisher Revolutionary Comics' line of music comics (including their flagship title Rock 'N' Roll Comics). The first collections were The Beatles Experience and Hard Rock Heroes, released in early 2010.

Many of Revolutionary's original creators participated in updating and modernizing the contents of the musical comic bios (which had been originally produced in the years 1989–1993). The reprints and updates were supervised by long-time Rock 'N' Roll Comics writer/editor Jay Allen Sanford. Ultimately, Bluewater released seven titles from 2010 to 2012.

Two other projected volumes, Rock 'N' Roll Cartoon History: The Sixties and Rock 'N' Roll Cartoon History: The Seventies, remain unpublished.

== Multi-media products ==
Nanny & Hank was optioned by Uptown 6 Productions for a feature film.

Insane Jane, as well as Tom Corbett, Space Cadet, were optioned by Pleroma for film adaptations.
