= Barry Blair =

Canadian comic book artist and writer

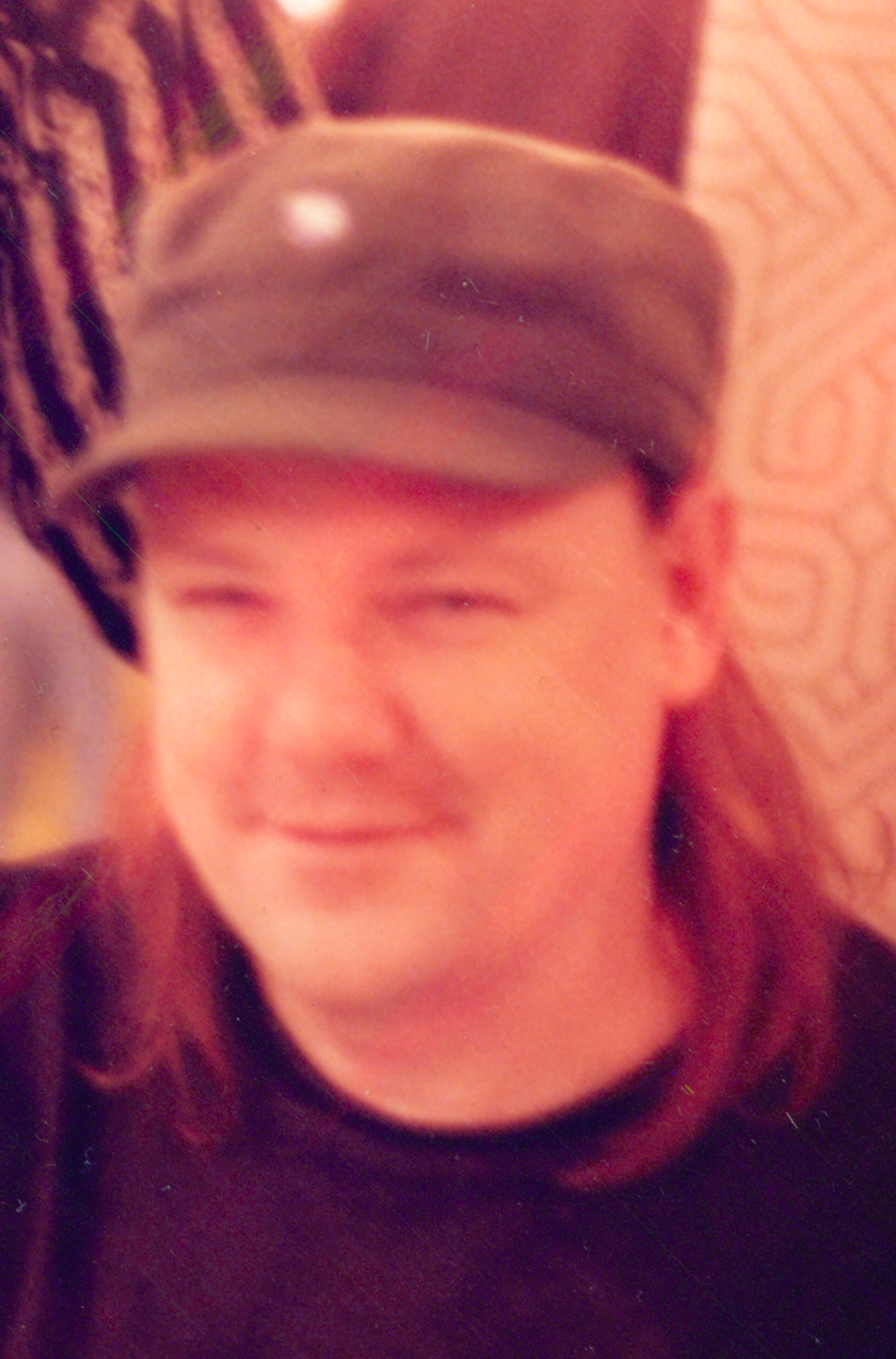
- Barry Blair at a New York comic convention in the early 1990s.
- Born: 1954 Ottawa, Ontario, Canada
- Died: January 3, 2010 (age 55)
- Areas: Writer, Penciller, Inker, Publisher, Colorist
- Pseudonym: Bao Lin Hum
- Notable works: ElfLord; Samurai

Barry Blair (1954 – January 3, 2010) was a Canadian comics publisher, artist and writer, known for launching Aircel Comics (publisher of titles such as Samurai, Elflord, Dragonforce, and The Men in Black) in the 1980s. From early on, Blair's art style was influenced by the comics he had seen living in East Asia, at a time when manga and other Asian comics were largely unknown in North America. His art was typically characterized by childlike figures, and included nudity and partial nudity. This continued into the erotica which became his main focus later in his career, and these attributes were a common criticism of his work.

== Life and career ==
Blair was born in Ottawa, Ontario, but spent his childhood from age nine onward moving back and forth between Canada and Taiwan, Hong Kong, Thailand, Burma, Cambodia, and Vietnam. He attended Carleton University in Ottawa but was expelled. Some of Blair's first professional work was animation for the children's television series You Can't Do That on Television and the science show Let Me Prove It.

In 1985, when the insulation company Blair worked for lost its contract with the government, he persuaded the owner to revamp the corporation as Aircel Comics under Blair's editorial direction. Aircel became a successful independent comics publisher during the industry expansion which followed. Blair wrote and illustrated several of his own series during the early years of Aircel, including Elflord (begun as a self-published series before Aircel became a publisher), Samurai, and Dragonring. During this time he also hired then-teenager Dave Cooper to work for Aircel. In the late 1980s he took over the series Warlock 5 and began his own series Team Nippon, adults-only Leather and Lace, Gun Fury (inked by Dave Cooper), and other series. In 1990–1992 he illustrated comics adaptations of the novels Logan's Run and Logan's World for Malibu Comics (which had acquired Aircel).

Blair left Aircel in 1991, forming his own production company, and beginning in 1992 he wrote and illustrated runs of the ElfQuest series New Blood and Blood of Ten Chiefs, and did other art and writing work for the then-expanding ElfQuest line, published by WaRP Graphics. His series Elflord and Samurai were briefly revived in collaboration with Colin Walbridge (then known as Colin Chan) at WaRP, Mad Monkey Press and finally DavDev, as well as a new series, Demongate, under the pseudonym Bao Lin Hum. In the early 2000s, Blair and Walbridge produced the adult graphic novel series Sapphire for NBM Publishing, as well as two titles, Sno and Dick Sweeney for now defunct French publisher Editions Paquet. Later they focused on work for online gaming and private commissions. They collaborated on Nymphettes, an art series featuring erotic illustrations. They joined with Santos Aleman to form Studio RealmWalkers in 2009.

Blair died on 3 January 2010, of a brain aneurysm that had been misdiagnosed as an ear infection. He was survived by his mother Marjorie Allan, his sister Sandra Garland, his brother Bruce, and his partner Colin Walbridge.
