= Isis (Bluewater Comics) =

- First appearance

Publication information
- Publisher: Image Comics; TidalWave Productions; Devil's Due Digital; Alias Enterprises
- First appearance: Image Introduces: The Legend of Isis #1 (Feb. 2002)
- Created by: Darren G. Davis

In-story information
- Alter ego: Jessica Eisen
- Team affiliations: The Odyssey
- Abilities: Enhanced strength, flight and energy manipulation, all derived from the Staff of Luxor; trained combat warrior

Isis is an American comic book character based on the goddess of the same name from Ancient Egyptian religion. Originally published by Image Comics, she has since been moved to her creator Darren G. Davis's publication of TidalWave Productions (formerly Bluewater Productions).

Originally published in February 2002 in a one-shot issue by Image Comics, Isis later appeared in The 10th Muse #10 and The Odyssey #1, both by Tidal Wave Studios and Avatar Press. In 2005 Isis would return in her own ongoing, monthly series, The Legend of Isis at Alias Enterprises by creator Darren G. Davis and writer Ryan Scott Ottney, before the last move to TidalWave.

Although some artistic depictions of the character, such as that shown in the comic illustration at right, make her resemble the DC Comics superhero and TV character of the same name, the Image/TidalWave version has no connection.

== Fictional character biography ==
Once a powerful warrior in Ancient Egypt, Isis fought in honorable battle with her sister, Nephtys. The victor of the battle would be wed to Osiris and welcomed into the Egyptian pantheon as its Queen Goddess. Isis defeated her sister, but spared her life. Nephtys and her brother Set, the advisor to the throne, devised an evil spell that cast Isis 5,000 years into the future and erased her from everyone's thoughts and minds.

Isis arrives in modern day Los Angeles, California and quickly draws the attention of the local police. Officer Scott Dean, feeling sorry for her, takes her into his care. Isis realizes that she has been erased from history, and Nephtys now sits next to Osiris in Egyptian mythology. She finds the Staff of Luxor at a local museum, and says that it was pulling her to it. Once Isis is near this staff, she is empowered with great abilities by the spirit of Osiris, who now channels his power through the staff and into her hands. The staff also enables her with complete fluency in English, but touching the Staff also awakens the spirit of Set, who is now an evil demi-god. Set has come back to destroy Isis so that he may complete his agreement with the Goddess Nephtys and be granted the full power of the God of Chaos and rule the world.

Scott, with the help of Crystal Van Howe (Scott's girlfriend), create a new identity for Isis to live in the modern world, and name her Jessica Eisen. "Jessica" takes on a job at a museum of Egyptian artifacts.

== Characters ==
=== Osiris ===
Osiris was much in love with the warrior Isis in his time, but an evil spell cast upon him by his advisor, Set, caused him and everyone else to forget that Isis ever existed as they cast her far into the future. Without remembering Isis, Osiris wed her sister, Nephtys, instead. Years later Nepytys and Set would devise a plot to kill Osiris, giving all power of Egypt to Nephtys. As Set carried out their plan, he told Osiris what they had done to Isis. In this moment, the spell over Osiris was lifted and he remembered everything. He used his last, dying breath to enchant the Staff of Luxor with the power of his spirit.

With his power contained within, the staff would seek out Isis wherever she may be, so that the two could be together someday and use this power to destroy the evil that tore them apart.

=== Jessica Eisen ===
Jessica Eisen is the name chosen by Scott Dean for the Egyptian Goddess Isis to adopt while living in modern time, named after Scott's mother. Jessica lives a quiet life in Los Angeles, California, where she works in a museum tending to many ancient artifacts from around the globe. Her specialty is, of course, Egyptian culture.

=== Other villains ===
- Lynx is the spirit of the Amazonian Goddess, Sekhent, who has inhabited the body of Crystal Van Howe through a mystic gem. Crystal was, at first, completely unaware of her possession, and she has no control over the evil spirit that erupts from within. Lynx wishes to enslave (or kill) all the men of the world and usher in a matriarchal dominant society. Lynx first appeared in The Legend of Isis #1 (Alias Enterprises, 2005).
- Wosret is the leader of the ancient, secret religion, known as the Council of Isis, who believes that Osiris prophesied to them the return of Isis, and they believe that Isis will lead them to destroy all "false" worldly-religions to re-establish the Egyptian Pantheon as a true and rightful gods. The Council uses a mind-altering chemical-gas to enslave people and abduct them to join their religion. The gas has a particularly violent effect on those thought to be more resistant to the Egyptian gods, and transforms their entire body into vicious, hideous, dog-like creatures. When Scott, and Crystal unleashed the chemical-antidote on the Council, its servants began to return to normal. When Isis tried the antidote on Wosret, however, he reverted to his original form: a massive, giant Dog-like creature, more vicious and deadly than any of the others. Wosret once believed that Isis was the fulfillment of the great prophecy, but since she destroyed his religion he now believes she is a false-Isis. Wosret is intent on destroying this false-Isis, as he continues to await the arrival of the "true" Isis. Wosret was created by writer Ryan Scott Ottney and first appeared in The Legend of Isis #6 (Alias Enterprises, 2006). The name Wosret translates to "Beautiful Isis".
- Silencer is a deadly female assassin (who never speaks), once hired to kill a colleague of Isis, named Judo Girl, who secretly replaced Silencer to infiltrate a mob boss circle, and had to fight Isis and Atlas who were unaware that this was not Silencer, but rather Judo Girl in disguise. Silencer later returned in the pages of Judo Girl comics. Silencer was created by writer Ryan Scott Ottney and first appeared in The Legend of Isis #5 (Alias Enterprises, 2006).

== Other media ==
In 2004 The Legend of Isis was optioned for a major motion picture by Paramount Pictures and Grammnet Productions, with screenwriter Ali Russell. No progress of the adaptation was made and the rights lapsed.
