= Evel Knievel in comics =

American stunt performer and entertainer

Evel Knievel was an American stunt performer and entertainer who through popularity made the jump to other media, including comics.

== Marvel ==
Marvel Comics in arrangement with Ideal Toy Company, released in 1974 a one-shot comic to tie-in with the Evel Knievel toy line. By John Romita Sr. and Joe Sinnott, the comic features the story "The Perilous Traps of Mr. Danger" where Knievel must stop the saboteur Mr. Danger from ending his career whilst utilising a range of vehicles from the respective toy line. The comic was given free at toy stores.

In 2014, Comic Book Resources ranked the comic #4 of 10 strangest licensed Marvel comics.

Knievel is even referenced in various Marvel media. In the episode "Helping Hand, Iron Fist" of The Incredible Hulk, War Machine refers to Rick Jones as "Evel Knievel".

== Bluewater Comics ==
In 2013, Bluewater Comics announced an Evel Knievel comic series and graphic novel to be released later in the year. To be written by Michael Dorman and Darren G. Davis, the comic was to have Knievel perform his unsuccessful Snake River Canyon jump where he'd then confront the Snake band of terrorists and battle a monster snake living underground. Accompanying him in the story would also be two teenage sidekicks. The series has yet to be released. (Note: No evidence can be found of the comic series having been released, presumably cancelled.)

== Half Evil Comics ==
In September 2025, an Evel Knievel comic book series was announced which would be published by Half Evil Comics and crowdfunded through Kickstarter. The series will be written by Rylend Grant and feature input from Knievel's son Kelly. The story has Knievel's attempt jumping over the Caesars Palace fountains and take on an ornery Outlaw Motorcycle Club who feel entitled.

A second issue had been announced in November 2026 which would also be crowdfunded through Kickstarter. The story will be based on Knievel's confrontation with outlaw bikers at Cow Palace in 1970.

== Other uses of Evel Knievel in comics ==
- In the fourth issue of the Black Dynamite series from IDW Publishing, Knievel makes a cameo watching someone jumping over three pintos.
- In Rough Riders Nation #1 from AfterShock Comics, Evel Knievel is shown to be part of a team in the 1970s together with Bruce Lee, Muhammad Ali, Billie Jean King and Carl Sagan.
