= Hulk: The End =

2002 one-shot comic book

Publication information
- Publisher: Marvel Comics
- Format: One-shot
- Genre: Superhero
- Publication date: August 2002
- No. of issues: 1
- Main character: Hulk

Creative team
- Written by: Peter David
- Penciller: Dale Keown
- Inker: Joe Weems
- Colorist: Dan Kemp

Hulk: The End is a one-shot comic book published by Marvel Comics in 2002. Written by Peter David and penciled by Dale Keown, it portrays a dystopian future where Bruce Banner, as the Hulk, endures as the last human survivor following a global nuclear catastrophe. It is a part of Marvel's The End publishing line, which examines potential final chapters for its characters.

== Publication history ==
The comic is an adaptation of the prose story "The Last Titan" by Peter David from The Ultimate Hulk short story collection. It was later reprinted in Giant-Size Hulk #1 (2006), which additionally included a Hulk vs Champions story (also by David), and a Planet Hulk story written by said storyline's creator Greg Pak.

== Plot ==
In the distant future, an elderly Bruce Banner wanders a barren and irradiated landscape. He is recorded by a Vidbot, a floating camera hovering at a constant distance of 10 feet away from him. The Hulk's radiation immunity, healing factor, and ability to eat anything have granted Banner an extended lifespan, leading him to believe that he is over 200 years old. The Hulk emerges at night or whenever Banner is agitated, and revels in the fact that all his enemies are dead, but longs for the day that he can finally be free of Banner. Having spent over a century exploring the entirety of North and South America, Bruce is able to confirm that he is the last human on Earth. Apart from the occasional bird or animal, the only other organisms known to have survived are swarms of giant mutated cockroaches that often attack the Hulk and try to consume him. The attacks leave the Hulk severely disfigured and eviscerated, and Banner has made a habit of viewing the attacks and the Hulk's subsequent recovery on playback via the Vidbot.

Banner happens upon the "Costumed Adventurers Memorial Park", where the remains of several superheroes had been laid to rest before the world spiraled into nuclear holocaust in their absence. While the Hulk was easily able to survive the barrage of nuclear weapons, the noise of the explosions and cries of dying people eventually came to bother him. The Hulk returned to his birthplace in New Mexico and sealed himself in a cave with a massive boulder, trapping Banner inside with him for many years. One day, the boulder was shoved aside by a Recorder, an extraterrestrial robot sent at the request of several races – including the newly aligned Kree and Skrulls – to document the demise of humanity. The Vidbot was left by the Recorder to chronicle Banner's final days.

Any attempt by Banner to commit suicide is thwarted by the Hulk, who remains obsessed with proving himself to be the strongest. One night, Banner dreams of having sex with a woman within a paradise. When the woman whispers to him that they would be "like gods", he violently awakes to a burning sensation in his chest. Banner, in sudden realization, draws a comparison between the Hulk and the Titan Prometheus; just as Prometheus was condemned to stay forever alive even while animals devour him for the crime of introducing fire to man, Banner speculates that the Hulk, as the embodiment of the "nuclear fire" that destroyed humanity, has been sentenced to the same fate. Banner recognizes that his own body is finally failing, further comparing his impending death to the mercy Prometheus was eventually granted. He spends his final moments hallucinating his deceased friends and loved ones, and pleads with the Hulk to let him go. The Hulk, refusing to die, proclaims his desire to be left alone.

The next morning, the Hulk somberly sits outside the cave, realizing that Banner has died. Acknowledging that he would also die if he changes back into Banner, the Hulk can only sit and wait, reflecting on the fact that he has finally achieved his wish to be alone.
