= Pitt (character) =

- Cover to Pitt #2 (July 1993)

Publication information
- Publisher: Image Comics; Full Bleed Studios
- First appearance: Pitt #1 (cover-dated January 1993; ashcan edition: November 1992)
- Created by: Dale Keown

In-story information
- Abilities: Super strength, enhanced healing, limited psychic powers, retractable claws

Pitt is a character who appears in a comics series by American publisher Full Bleed Studios. Created by Dale Keown, Pitt is a human-alien hybrid, created by an alien race known as the Creed, genetically engineered to serve as a killing machine. He appears more alien than human, with red, pupil-less eyes, gray skin, absence of a nose, sharp oversized teeth and large talons.

== Publication history ==
Dale Keown, who was working as an artist on a successful run of The Incredible Hulk with Peter David, was invited up to Todd McFarlane's home in late 1991 wherein McFarlane spoke at length about the frustrations experienced from working with Marvel Comics' corporate machinations and mistreatment of freelancers and how important it was that they consider creating their own creator-owned characters and works. As Keown had not considered creating his own character prior to McFarlane asking if he had anything he was working on, Keown lied and said yes and immediately set to work designing an original character. As Keown's affinity for large muscular characters like the Hulk led him to comics in the first place, he used that as the basis for his character's design before adding other elements he liked such as claws and Pitt's really large mouth. Keown departed his position at Marvel on good terms with David and Incredible Hulk editor Bobbie Chase which would allow for the Hulk/Pitt One-shot in 1996.

In 1993, Dale Keown began publishing his character Pitt at Image Comics. Pitt first appeared in Pitt #1 (cover-dated January 1993; ashcan edition: November 1992). Pitt #1 was the second best-selling comic book of November 1993, surpassed only by the collector's edition of Superman (vol. 2) #75. Pitt then appeared in Youngblood #4 (February 1993).

The series became noted for its massive scheduling delays with a six month break between the release of Pitt #1 and Pitt #2. Keown admitted that the delays came about due in part not only from his perfectionism, but also his inexperience with the business side of comics as well as becoming sidetracked with a Pitt related musical project called The Pitt Crew consisting of Keown and 4 other musicians that had developed 10 songs comprising a 42 minute master recording.

In 1995, the publication of Pitt was moved over to Full Bleed Studios (Dale Keown's own company) for issues #10–20. Issue #20 was the final issue.

== Fictional character biography ==
In 1981, Allen and Annie Bracken, while on their way from the hospital, were taken by a Creed spaceship where their emperor Zoyvod took a fertilized egg from Annie and then returned them to Earth. While the Brackens were on Earth with what would become Pitt's brother Timmy, Zoyvod combined his genetic structure with the fertilized egg that would become Pitt.

In the Creed Imperial stronghold the egg grew in a gestation tank, until the creature unexpectedly awoke and escaped. He was ultimately caught and Wroth, another Creed hybrid (and half-brother to Pitt), assaulted him. Believing him dead, a Creed alien named Quagg was supposed to get rid of the body, but was attacked by Pitt while flying to the corpse dumping grounds. In the fight, Pitt was blasted out through the door of the shuttle.

On the ground, Pitt clawed his way out of the dumping ground and lived in the wilds until Zoyvod sent a team out to retrieve him. Quagg and his team did manage to retrieve him, but only Quagg survived the mission. Pitt was then trained by Quagg and given his name. For years he worked as Zoyvod's assassin until an attack on the planet Chakra where someone named the Seer melded the consciousness of the child Jereb – an alien with 'immense spiritual power" – with Pitt. The merger apparently changed Pitt, turning him into a fugitive. Eventually he ended up on Earth.

When Pitt arrived on Earth, he materialized in a New York City subway near Timmy and saved him and his grandfather from muggers. Immediately after, he disappeared into the city, drifting around while trying to adapt to the new world. On Earth he was followed by the Creed. Timmy, having a genetic structure similar to Pitt, was attacked instead of Pitt, bringing Timmy and Pitt together again. This was also the first time Rai-Kee met Pitt, who had been masquerading as "Bobbie Harras" a New York City Police Officer. During the fight, Jereb left Pitt and entered Timmy, enabling him to defeat Zoyvod.

After the fight, Timmy was kidnapped by the Creed. To affect his rescue, Pitt teamed up with Axiom – a New York-based superhero group. Pitt's half brother Wroth was working with Professor Holdsworth, the leader of Axiom. Holdsworth wanted the power in Timmy, and Wroth wanted Pitt. Their plan was foiled, however. Holdsworth's fate was not revealed but Wroth escaped [6-8]. He returned later and was defeated by Zoyvod who had taken over Pitt's body for a short while.

Due to the war between the Creed and the Cenobite, Pitt would have been attacked by the Cenobite, had they found him on Earth. The Cenobite Eurial therefore hid him in an alternate dimension known as Shimmerspace until they were gone. There, Pitt met Jereb again. While in Shimmerspace, Jereb could see all time at once: past, present, and future. He told Pitt some of the things that would happen to him. Pitt was only in Shimmerspace very shortly but when he came out, five years had passed on Earth.

While Pitt had been in Shimmerspace, an organization bent on world domination known as the ThinkTank had created Pitt clones – one of which was sent to steal some alien artifacts from a military installation. For this, the U.S. Army sent both troops and their best officer Captain Curtis to kill Pitt. They only succeeded in killing Captain Curtis and the US soldiers, and Pitt went to the White House where he killed Bill Clinton's double on the lawn. Pitt somehow found out about the ThinkTank being behind it all and went to the Crossbow Technologies building where he killed their leaders, the Guileys.

== Powers ==
Pitt has vast super strength, he uses pain as a stimulant; and can leap 10 km in one bound. He also has razor sharp claws that tear through most, possibly all substances. Pitt has high durability, being able to survive attacks that would kill or disable superhuman beings with relative ease; and can heal near fatal wounds very quickly. He has limited psychic powers (mind reading), and uses his opponents' aggression to lock-on to his enemies.
