= William F. Nolan =

American writer (1928–2021)

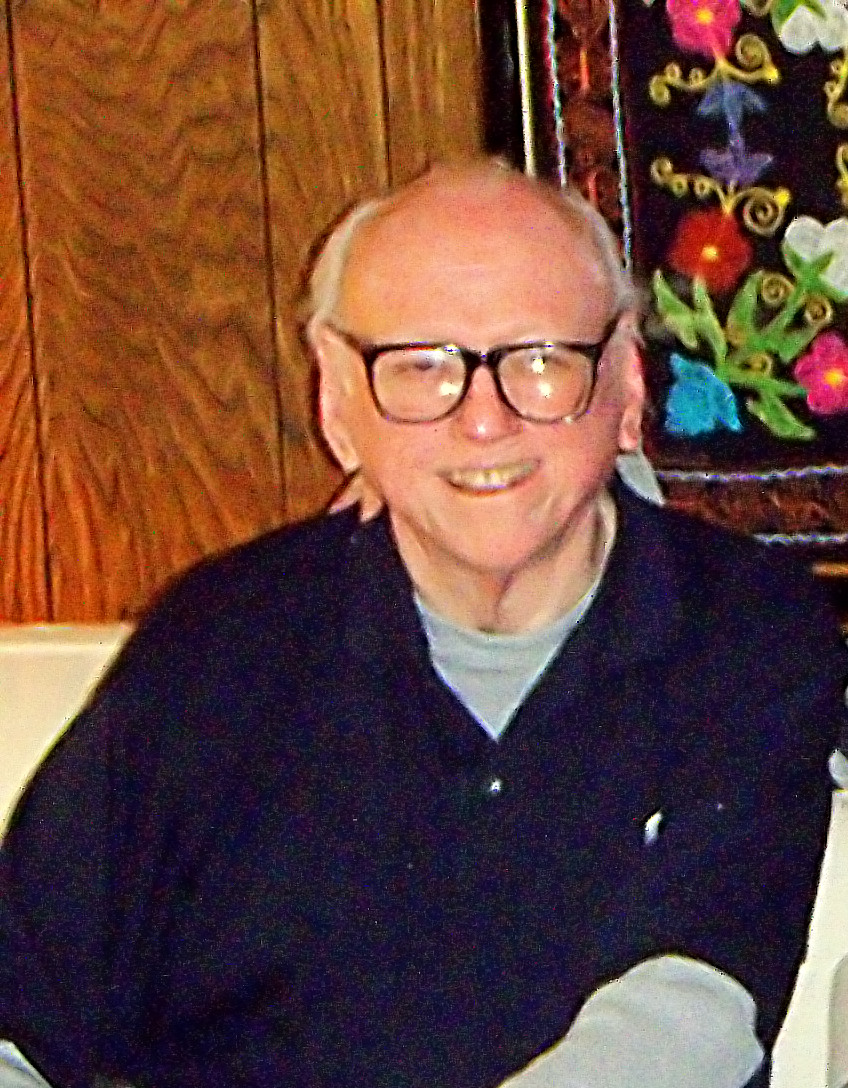
- William F. Nolan in 2008
- Born: William Francis Nolan; March 6, 1928; Kansas City, Missouri, U.S.
- Died: July 15, 2021 (aged 93); Vancouver, Washington, U.S.
- Occupation: Writer
- Writing career
- Years active: 1952–2021
- Genres: Science fiction; magical realism; fantasy; literary; western; horror
- Notable works: Logan's Run; Trilogy of Terror; Burnt Offerings (film); Helltracks
- Notable awards: MWA Edgar Allan Poe Award Nominee (1×); IHG Living Legend in Dark Fantasy Winner, 2002; SFWA Author Emeritus, 2006; HWA Lifetime Achievement Award Winner, 2010; World Fantasy Convention Award, 2013; World Horror Society Grand Master 2015
- Website: The William F. Nolan Archive

William Francis Nolan (March 6, 1928 – July 15, 2021) was an American author who was active in the science fiction, fantasy, horror, and crime fiction genres.

== Career ==
Nolan became involved in science fiction fandom in the 1950s, and published several fanzines, including Ray Bradbury Review. During this time, Nolan befriended several science fiction and fantasy writers, including Ray Bradbury, Robert Bloch, Richard Matheson, Charles Beaumont, and Ray Russell. Nolan became a professional author in 1956. Nolan is perhaps best known for coauthoring the novel Logan's Run, with George Clayton Johnson, but wrote hundreds of pieces, from poetry to nonfiction, to prose, for many publications, such as Sports Illustrated, Rogue, Playboy, Dark Discoveries, Nameless Digest, and others. Nolan wrote several mystery novels, including the "Challis" series. He also had a long career in the movie industry, primarily working for Dan Curtis, and co-wrote the screenplay for the 1976 horror film Burnt Offerings which starred Karen Black and Bette Davis.

Nolan was also a prolific editor of collections (by others), and anthologies, most recently co-editing two anthologies with friend, filmmaker, and writer Jason V Brock: The Bleeding Edge (2009), with stories from fellow writers Ray Bradbury, Richard Matheson, George Clayton Johnson, John Shirley, Dan O'Bannon, and several others, and The Devil's Coattails (2012), which featured offerings from Ramsey Campbell, S. T. Joshi, Richard Selzer, Earl Hamner Jr., and more, both from Cycatrix Press. Nolan teamed up with Bluewater Productions for a comic book series, Logan's Run: Last Day, released in 2010. In addition, he developed comics based on one other property of his for Bluewater: Tales from William F. Nolan's Dark Universe (featuring stories adapted by Nolan and Brock and published in 2013).

Nolan was nominated once for the Edgar Allan Poe Award from the Mystery Writers of America. He was voted a Living Legend in Dark Fantasy by the International Horror Guild in 2002, and in 2006 was bestowed the honorary title of Author Emeritus by the Science Fiction and Fantasy Writers of America. In 2010, he received the Lifetime Achievement Bram Stoker Award from the Horror Writers Association (HWA). In 2013 he was a recipient, along with Brian W. Aldiss, of the World Fantasy Convention Award in Brighton, England by the World Fantasy Convention. In May 2014, Nolan was presented with another Bram Stoker Award, for Superior Achievement in Nonfiction; this was for his collection about his late friend Ray Bradbury, called Nolan on Bradbury: Sixty Years of Writing about the Master of Science Fiction. In 2015, Nolan was named a World Horror Society Grand Master; the award was presented at the World Horror Convention in Atlanta in May of that year.

== Personal life ==
Nolan was born in Kansas City, Missouri, the son of Bernadette Mariana Kelly, a stenographer, and Michael Cahill Nolan, an adventurer, and sportsman. His family was Irish Catholic. He briefly attended the Kansas City Art Institute. Later, he worked for Hallmark Cards, Inc. writing verses and illustrating greeting cards before moving to California with his parents.

After a few years working in offices, he met Charles Beaumont, who would remain a close friend until Beaumont's untimely death at age thirty-eight. Beaumont was instrumental in Nolan becoming an author.

Nolan was a close friend to radio writer Norman Corwin as well as speculative writer Ray Bradbury. He was also a member of the influential Southern California School of Writers in the 1950s–1960s (known informally as "The Group"), many of whom wrote for Alfred Hitchcock Presents, The Twilight Zone, Star Trek, and other popular series of the day. Nolan was a strict vegetarian. In later life, he still wrote new material and was active in various literary projects, and conventions (he was Guest of Honor at Killer Con and Portland's Orycon, as well as a special guest at the World Horror Convention, World Fantasy Convention, and many others), and promotional opportunities.

As a youth, Nolan was a sports car driver who raced at circuits around Southern California. In the 1950s, he got to know many other young drivers including actor James Dean. In an interview with American Legends website, Nolan recalled Dean's unique racing style: "Jimmy was tough on engines. The kind of driver who was known as a 'lead foot.' He had a Porsche Speedster which he had 'souped up.' As I recall, he redid the carburetor and took off the windshields to cut down on the drag. In his first race in Palm Springs, Dean won by a quarter lap. It took a lot of skill to win in a 'street machine.'"

Though estranged for more than ten years, he had been married since 1970. Nolan resided in Bend, Oregon for many years until relocating to Vancouver, Washington, around 2006. With regard to his work, he said: "I get excited about something, and I want to write about it."

Nolan died from complications of an infection in July 2021 at the age of 93.

== Appearances: films, TV and documentaries ==
- The Intruder (1962) as villain "Bart Carey"
- Charles Beaumont: The Life of Twilight Zone’s Magic Man (JaSunni Productions, LLC; 2010) as himself
- The AckerMonster Chronicles! (JaSunni Productions, LLC; 2012) as himself

== Bibliography (partial) ==
=== Novels ===
==== Logan ====
- Logan's Run (1967) – Novel (with George Clayton Johnson)
- Logan's World (1977) – Second novel in the "Logan Trilogy"
- Logan's Search (1980) – Third novel in the "Logan Trilogy"
- Logan's Return (2001) – Novella, released as an e-book
- Logan's Last Run (2026) - Final novel in the series (with Paul McComas)

==== The Black Mask ====
- The Black Mask Murders (1994) – Novel
- The Marble Orchard (1996) – Novel
- Sharks Never Sleep (1998) – Novel

==== Sam Space ====
- Space for Hire (1971) – Novel
- Look Out for Space (1985) – Novel
- 3 For Space (1992) – Collection
- Far Out (2004) – Collection
- Seven for Space (2008) – Collection

==== Challis ====
- Death Is For Losers (1968) – Novel
- The White Cad Cross-Up (1969) – Novel
- Helle on Wheels (1992) – Novella
- The Brothers Challis (1996) – Collection

==== Kincaid ====
- Pirate's Moon (1987) – Novella
- Broxa (1991) - Novella
- The Winchester Horror (1998) – Novella
- Demon! [Reprint of Broxa] (2005) – Novella
- Kincaid: A Paranormal Casebook (2011) – Collection

=== Biographies ===
==== On Max Brand ====
- Max Brand's Best Western Stories (1981) – Brand Collection
- Max Brand's Best Western Stories II (1985) – Brand Collection
- Max Brand: Western Giant (1986) – Anthology/Bibliography
- Max Brand's Best Western Stories III (1987) – Brand Collection
- Tales of the Wild West (1997) – Brand Collection
- More Tales of the Wild West (1999) – Brand Collection
- Masquerade (2005) – Brand Collection
- King of the Pulps (forthcoming) – Biography

==== On Dashiell Hammett ====
- Dashiell Hammett: A Casebook (1969) – Critical study
- Hammett: A Life at the Edge (1983) – Biography
- Dash (2004) – Stage Play
- A Man Called Dash: The Life and Times of Samuel Dashiell Hammett (Alfred A. Knopf) – Definitive biography. (unpublished as of August 2025)

==== On Ray Bradbury ====
- Ray Bradbury Review (1952) – Anthology
- The Ray Bradbury Index (1953) – Pamphlet
- The Ray Bradbury Companion (1975) – Biography/bibliography
- The Dandelion Chronicles (1984) – Pamphlet
- The Bradbury Chronicles (1991) – Anthology (with Martin H. Greenberg)
- Nolan On Bradbury: Sixty Years of Writing about the Master of Science Fiction (2013; Hippocampus Press) – Collected nonfiction book (Edited by S. T. Joshi)

==== Other biographies and nonfiction ====
- Adventure on Wheels (1959) – John Fitch autobiography
- Barney Oldfield (1961) – Biography
- Phil Hill: Yankee Champion (1962) – Biography
- John Huston: King Rebel (1965) - Biography
- Sinners and Supermen (1965) – Nonfiction collection
- Steve McQueen: Star on Wheels (1972) – Biography
- Hemingway: Last Days of the Lion (1974) – Biographical chapbook
- McQueen (1984) - Biography
- The Black Mask Boys (1985) – Biography/Anthology
- How to Write Horror Fiction (1990) – Reference
- Let's Get Creative: Writing Fiction That Sells! (2006) - Reference

=== Bibliographies ===
- The Work of Charles Beaumont (1986)
- The Work of William F. Nolan (1988)

=== Anthologies and collections (as editor) ===
- The Fiend in You (1962) – Anthology (with Charles Beaumont; Nolan is uncredited)
- The Pseudo-People (1965)
- Man Against Tomorrow (1965)
- Il Meglio Della Fantascienza (1967)
- 3 To the Highest Power (1968)
- A Wilderness of Stars (1969)
- A Sea of Space (1970)
- The Edge of Forever (1971) – Collection of Chad Oliver stories
- The Future is Now (1971)
- The Human Equation: Four Science Fiction Novels of Tomorrow (1971)
- Science Fiction Origins (1980) - Anthology (with Martin H. Greenberg)
- Urban Horrors (1990) – Anthology (with Martin H. Greenberg)
- California Sorcery, Edited by Nolan and William Schafer (1998)
- Offbeat (2002) – Collection of Richard Matheson stories
- The Bleeding Edge (2009) – Anthology (with Jason V Brock)
- The Devil's Coattails (2012) – Anthology (with Jason V Brock)

=== Verse ===
- The Mounties (1979) – Broadside
- Dark Encounters (1986) – Collection
- Have You Seen the Wind? (2003) – Collection, with prose
- Ill Met by Moonlight (2004) – Collection, with prose and artwork
- Soul Trips (2015) – Collection

=== Auto racing-specific works ===
- Omnibus of Speed (1958) – Anthology (with Charles Beaumont)
- Men of Thunder (1964) – Collection
- When Engines Roar (1964) – Anthology (with Charles Beaumont)
- Carnival of Speed (1973) – Collection

=== Horror works ===
- Things Beyond Midnight (1984) – Collection
- Blood Sky (1991) – Chapbook
- Helltracks (1991) – Novel
- Night Shapes (1995) – Collection
- William F. Nolan's Dark Universe (2001) – Career retrospective
- Nightworlds (2004) – Collection

=== Miscellaneous works ===
- A Cross Section of Art in Science-Fantasy (1952) – Chapbook
- Image Power (1988) – Pamphlet
- Rio Renegades (1989) – Western novel
- Simply An Ending (2002) – Pamphlet
- With Marlowe in L.A. (2003) – Pamphlet

=== Other Nolan collections ===
- Impact-20 (1963) – Short stories
- Alien Horizons (1974)
- Wonderworlds (1977)
- Down the Long Night (2000)
- Ships in the Night: And Other Stories (2003) – Collection of sci-fi, Western, etc.
- Wild Galaxy: Selected Science Fiction Stories (2005)
- Like a Dead Man Walking and Other Shadow Tales (edited by Jason V Brock; a mix of science fiction, horror, poetry, and literary stories; Centipede Press, 2014)

=== Screenplays ===
- Burnt Offerings (1976)
- Who Goes There? (a.k.a. The Thing) Screen treatment (1978), written for Universal Studios (not produced), published by Rocket Ride Books in "Who Goes There?: The Novella That Formed The Basis of THE THING" (2009)

=== Television scripts ===
- ”Brain Wave” (1959) – One Step Beyond
- ”Mental Lapse” (1959) – Wanted: Dead or Alive
- ”Black Belt” (1960) – Wanted: Dead or Alive
- ”The Joy of Living” (1971) – Norman Corwin Presents
- The Norliss Tapes (1973) – NBC Movie of the Week
- The Turn of the Screw (1974) – ABC Movie of the Week
- Trilogy of Terror (Millicent and Therese; Julie) (1975) – ABC Movie of the Week
- Melvin Purvis: G-Man (1975)
- Sky Heist (1975) – NBC Movie of the Week
- The Kansas City Massacre (1975) – ABC Movie of the Week
- Logan's Run (1977) – Pilot for CBS series
- ”First Loss” (1981) – 240-Robert
- ”The Partnership” (1981) – Darkroom
- Bridge Across Time, a.k.a. Terror at London Bridge (1985) – NBC Movie of the Week
- Trilogy of Terror II (The Graveyard Rats; He Who Kills) (1996) – USA Movie of the Week
