= Trilogy of Terror II =

1996 American anthology horror film

- Television movie poster
- Genre: Horror; Thriller
- Written by: Dan Curtis; William F. Nolan
- Directed by: Dan Curtis
- Starring: Lysette Anthony
- Music by: Bob Cobert
- Countries of origin: United States; Canada
- Original language: English

Production
- Producer: Julian Marks
- Production location: Toronto
- Cinematography: Elemér Ragályi
- Editor: Bill Blunden
- Running time: 90 minutes
- Production companies: Dan Curtis Productions; Wilshire Court Productions; Power Pictures; Paramount Television

Original release
- Network: USA Network
- Release: October 30, 1996

Trilogy of Terror II is a 1996 American made-for-television anthology horror film and a sequel to Trilogy of Terror (1975), both directed by Dan Curtis. The film follows the formula of the original, with one female lead (Lysette Anthony) playing parts in each of three segments.

== Plot ==
=== Story 1: The Graveyard Rats ===
A millionaire named Ansford discovers his young wife Laura having an affair with her cousin. Having video proof, he orders Laura to be faithful and honest or he will turn the video over to the news stations and cut her out of his will. Her lover Ben comes up with the idea to murder Ansford and collect all his money. Ansford is pushed down the stairs and killed. Before dying, Ansford transferred all of his money into an account in Zürich and microfilmed the access codes, which were buried with him. Laura and Ben dig up his coffin to retrieve the microfilm. Laura shoots and kills Ben to claim all the money for herself. Ansford's body is dragged through a hole in the side of the coffin by large flesh-eating rats, so Laura crawls in after them through a network of underground graveyard tunnels. The advancing rats corner her in another buried coffin. Laura tries to keep the rats away by firing her gun at them, but the rats pour into the coffin and devour her.

=== Story 2: Bobby ===
It has been some time since Bobby "accidentally" drowned, leaving his mother Alma depressed and guilty. While her husband is away on business, she determines to raise her son from the dead. Armed with a magic book and a "Key of Solomon" (in this case, a talisman rather than a book), she conjures up dark forces to bring her son back. Before she goes to bed, a vicious thunderstorm approaches the luxurious beach mansion. Hearing a knock, she opens the door to discover her son. After cleaning him up, she begins to make him feel at home again. However, Bobby acts completely mad and begins to terrorize his mother in the dark house with a sledgehammer and a butcher knife. The mother realizes that it is not Bobby who returned to her, but a demon, as he says "Bobby hates you, Mommy, so he sent me instead," revealing his demonic face.

=== Story 3: He Who Kills ===
A Zuni fetish doll found at the scene of a double homicide is delivered to Dr. Simpson by the police. She learns that the doll comes to life when a gold chain is removed from its neck and that the doll has a desire for flesh. It also seems to regenerate; when she chips away the charred wood, the doll seems to be brand new.

After a break, she discovers the doll missing. One of the officers investigates the adjacent museum and is shot by the doll with an arrow from one of the exhibits. Simpson finds the doll running towards her with a knife. The doll attacks her, and Simpson catches it in a briefcase. Simpson tries to grab the knife as the doll cuts through the briefcase and is cut. Simpson stabs it with a screwdriver and opens the briefcase. The doll viciously bites her. She tosses the doll into a large container of sulfuric acid. As the doll breaks apart, Simpson puts on black rubber gloves and uses tongs to remove the doll's remains, but is possessed by the spirit inhabiting the doll. When Simpson's date arrives at the museum, she kills him with an ax.

== Cast ==
- Lysette Anthony as Laura Ansford / Alma / Dr. Simpson
- Geraint Wyn Davies as Ben
- Matt Clark as Ansford
- Geoffrey Lewis as Stubbs
- Blake Heron as Bobby
- Richard Fitzpatrick as Jerry O'Farrell
- Thomas Mitchell as Lew
- Gerry Quigley as Akers
- Dennis O'Connor as Brig
- John McMahon as Taylor
- Alan Bridle as the Minister
- Brittaney Bennett as the Waitress
- Norm Spencer as Officer #1
- Bruce McFee as Officer #2
- Joe Gieb as the Dwarf Bobby
- Alex Carter as Breslow
- Philip Williams as Pete
- Tom Melissis as Rothstein
- Aron Tager as Steve
- Durward Allen as Spaulding
- Peter Keleghan as Dennis

== Production ==
Trilogy of Terror II was produced by Dan Curtis Productions and first aired on Showtime on October 30, 1996. The film was directed by Dan Curtis, who also directed the 1975 TV movie Trilogy of Terror which inspired this sequel.

This first segment (screenplay by William F. Nolan and Dan Curtis) is based on Henry Kuttner's short story "The Graveyard Rats", albeit considerably altered. In Kuttner's tale, the thief Masson is a male cemetery caretaker who habitually steals valuables from the corpses in a graveyard beset by a colony of abnormally large rats. The second segment is a re-filming of a script by Richard Matheson. It was originally written by Matheson for the Dan Curtis omnibus movie Dead of Night. The third segment, about the Zuni Fetish Doll "He Who Kills," is a sequel to the third segment of the original film Trilogy of Terror, "Amelia". Its screenplay was written by Nolan and Curtis.

== Home media releases ==
Trilogy of Terror II was released on DVD by Universal Studios Home Entertainment on September 2, 2008 and on Blu-ray by Kino Lorber on Oct 22, 2019.

== Reception ==
Brett Gallman from Oh, the Horror! gave the film a mixed review, feeling that the film was "a quick way to cash in on a well-known property". TV Guide awarded the film 1/5 stars, calling it "belated", and felt that it was essentially a rerun of the original film.
