= Berserker (comics) =

American comic book series

- Cover of issue #0

Publication information
- Publisher: Image Comics
- Genre: Superhero

Creative team
- Created by: Rick Loverd; Jeremy Haun

Berserker is a series of American comic books printed by Top Cow Productions. The comic debuted in 2009 with issue #0 on the Top Cow website and the first issue printed in June 2009.

The series is produced by Milo Ventimiglia (at the time known for his role of Peter Petrelli on the TV series Heroes) and Russ Cundiff of DiVide Pictures. It is authored by Rick Loverd, drawn by Jeremy Haun, colored by Dave McCaig with covers drawn by Dale Keown.

== Plot ==
The current story arc revolves around the lives of Aaron and Farris who discover that they are Berserkers; humans who have a powerfully violent and uncontrollable rage living inside them which gives them superhuman strength and power, but also clouds their judgement and renders them unable to tell friend from foe. Meanwhile, two mysterious organizations, Midgard International and Asgaard, seek them out for their powerful abilities for their own purposes while Farris and Aaron struggle to come to grips with their newfound power and dangerous heritage. Berserker combines elements of superheroes with Norse mythology and human themes of courage and determination.

== Main characters ==
- Farris Jorn - One of the two protagonists of the story. Farris was a soldier in Afghanistan when his Berserker rage was awakened while being tortured by a terrorist named Ahmed. His rage is triggered by his abusive boss. He is stronger and faster than other Berserkers, possesses a heightened sense of smell, immunity to fire and heat, and is unaffected by chemical-induced paralysis.
- Aaron Bural - One of the two protagonists of the story. His Berserker rage was awakened during a wrestling match with his girlfriend's ex-boyfriend. He inherited his rage from his father, who is also a Berserker. He is stronger and faster than other Berserkers, has superior durability, is unharmed by fire or intense heat, and has shown to be able to become enraged and use his power even after drinking a muscle-paralyzing solution.
- Karl Locke - A member of Asgaard and a Berserker. He is regarded as a terrorist by the FBI. He is shown to be a fanatically insane Norse zealot who is devoted to bringing about Ragnarok so that Odin's armies can rise.
- Val Balder - A member of Midgard International. Through meditation, he has learned to control his Berserker rage.
- Hel - The Norse goddess of death and the queen of Hel. She is never named in the series, though she takes the form of Cortney, Aaron's dead girlfriend, in order to guide him. In her true form, half of her body is healthy and beautiful while the other half is decayed and zombie-like. Her powers include shape-shifting, illusion casting, invisibility, teleportation, and flight.
