= Hyper-Actives =

Comic book series

Publication information
- Publisher: Alias Enterprises
- Schedule: Monthly
- Format: Limited series
- Main character(s): Silverwing; Reactor Girl; Rush; Honeychild; Surefire; Boy Genius; Wereclaw; Panzer; Scandal

Creative team
- Created by: Darin Wagner; Clint Hilinski

Hyper-Actives is a comic book limited series published by Alias Comics featuring teenaged superheroes. The series is written by Darin Wagner and illustrated by Clint Hilinski and Andrew Dalhouse. The series is recognized as the first Alias comic to feature traditional superheroes and contains such themes as the importance of fatherhood and the shallow nature of fame.

== Characters ==
The Hyper-Actives are made up of teenaged superheroes recruited by Alphaman, the premiere superhero of the continuity featured within the book. Alphaman, an obvious homage to Superman, is essentially their mentor and they are essentially his wards, not unlike the relationship Batman has with Robin.

As of issue #3, the team's roster is as follows:

- Silverwing: A legacy-type superhero and most recent recipient of the "Silverwing Essence"
- Reactor Girl: A nuclear-powered supergirl and daughter of Alphaman
- Rush: Self-appointed leader of the team, superspeed hero and son of Alphaman
- Surefire: A weapon master, similar to the Marvel Comics anti-hero Punisher, though more satirical
- Honeychild: An African-American superheroine resembling Marvel Comics' Wasp
- Wereclaw: A feral looking, wolfman-type character
- Boy Genius: An inventive super-genius and the youngest member of the team
- Panzer: An apparently German superhero with the size, power and texture of a tank
- Scandal: Warps probability fields ("causing trouble"), possibly invisibility

== Story ==
Hyper-Actives #0 is a 10-page preview issue which introduces the team and depicts them losing a fight with a cold-powered supervillain named Thrillchiller. The team is unfocused and too preoccupied with the nearby news crew to be effective in preventing Thrillchiller's jail break. Afterwards, Rush is shown blowing off the loss to a tabloid television reporter. This issue also introduces the character of Eddie Ellison, a high school student who eventually becomes the newest member of the team as Silverwing.

Issue #1 depicts the death of the long-running superhero named Silverwing and Eddie's transformation into the newest incarnation of Silverwing. Eddie is then approached by Alphaman and offered membership in his team, which was named "The Hyper-Actives" by the media and not Alphaman. Eddie arrives at the team's headquarters, referred to as the "Hypersphere" and is initially dismissed as a Fanboy. It is here that superheroes call normal people as "peds". The term is derogatory and phonetically reminiscent of the word "sped" (an inappropriate term used in referring to the mentally disabled). "Ped" is derived from the word "pedestrian", which is the word most of the adult superheroes use to describe normal people. The issue ends in a cliffhanger where a team of villains called "Uberforce" break into the Hypersphere and corner Silverwing.

Issue #2 continues the story, depicting Silverwing on the verge of single-handedly defeating Uberforce. He is prevented from actually doing so due to the arrival of the rest of the team. They distract Silverwing and he gets rendered unconscious. Uberforce easily defeats the rest of the team, thanks to their preparations made prior to the attack. Uberforce kidnaps two members and the rest of the H-As mount a rescue, excluding Silverwing, whom they reject as a member. The team makes their way to Uberforce's hideout, leaving Silverwing behind. Silverwing, however, discovers that he can magically modify vehicles into superhero versions (like the Batmobile) and uses his mother's car (so transformed) to follow them. Silverwing arrives in time to save the team from Uberforce. This issue suffered from incomplete copy and some pages have several pieces of dialogue missing while one had all of the dialogue missing. The reason for these omissions is not known, but creator Darin Wagner has stated on various message boards that it was a clerical error and that future reprints of the issue would have the full dialogue present.

Issue #3 depicts the team attending a yearly superhero convention. This convention is actually more like a real-life comic book convention, except that it features actual superheroes as opposed to actors who play them on TV and films. The team displays their obsession with attention in force at the con, and Rush in particular demonstrates his apathy toward the pedestrians in attendance. At one point Rush casually takes a pedestrian's cell phone, interrupting the man's own phone call, so Rush can call his press agent. When the man protests, Rush says "Quiet ped! Can't you see Rush is on the phone?!". During the convention, Reactor Girl is drawn into a catfight with a walk-on superheroine referred to as "K" (an obvious parody of Supergirl). The convention is interrupted by a mechanical menace called Ultimato, who constantly declares that he is indestructible and cannot be stopped. Rush initially ignores the threat, instead taking the opportunity for an interview from the media personnel in attendance, but eventually takes charge and attempts to convince Ultimato to destroy himself, citing numerous instances in which that technique worked. Silverwing, however, notices a weakness in Ultimato's chassis and, once Rush's plan fails, rallies the team to his side to try a physical assault. Rush does not join them and demonstrates immaturity and jealousy in doing so. The team defeats Ulitimato and is rewarded with a media blitz while Rush looks on from afar with a spiteful look.

Issue #4 takes place an unknown number of days after the convention and mostly in the Hypersphere. A black political pundit, referred to as a "mayor", is shown in a televised interview as criticizing the existence of the new Silverwing. He demands to know what happened to the previous one (who was black) and cites an overall shortage of black superheroes. The "Mayor" is an obvious pastiche of New Orleans Mayor Ray Nagin, who once referred to New Orleans as a "chocolate city". The "Mayor" character refers to Silverwing as being a "chocolate superhero". Rush attempts to use this interview as leverage to get a consensus from the rest of the team that they should kick Silverwing. The team does not want to, feeling good about their Ultimato victory. Wereclaw then flips the channel and shows that the footage of the argument Rush had with Silverwing outside the convention has actually been receiving more airtime than the pundit. Not having achieved the consensus he desired, Rush confronts Silverwing (who is in Eddie Ellison form) and demands that he pack up and leave, calling him a "ped" a number of times. Silverwing then gives Rush the etymology of the term, which is short for pedestrian, and defines it as "someone who travels on foot". As Rush is a superspeed runner, he is enraged by this and goes on a miniature megolomaniacal rant, declaring himself to be "the modern Mercury, the god of speed" and also manages to refer to Silverwing as "uppity". Silverwing then informs Rush that Mercury was not the god of anything, but rather the messenger of the gods and "had a paper route" (Rush demonstrated in the first issue that he abhorred the idea of having to work for a newspaper when it was suggested that his father, Alphaman, would make him take such a job if he did not keep up on current events). Rush zooms out of Silverwing's room in frustration and confronts Alphaman, demanding that Silverwing be removed from the team. Rush doesn't notice that Alphaman is holding a strange device in his hand. Alphaman attacks Rush, blasting at him with his laservision. Rush escapes death by vibrating, but the Hypersphere is partially destroyed by the attack. By the time the rest of the team is on the scene, Alphaman has flown off. Boy Genius identifies the device Alphaman was holding as having been constructed by Doktor Uberkoff (leader of the Uberforce). Uberkoff's attack on the sphere in issue one was a diversion in order to plant the device, which has bent Alphaman to his will. Silverwing concludes that Uberkoff was counting on the team's self-absorbed attitude to conceal the true nature of his attack. The team (minus Rush) then intercepts Alphaman and attempts to stop him from joining Uberkoff, while Rush speeds to the prison where Uberkoff is being held in order to somehow break his control over Alphaman. Rush narrowly reaches Uberkoff in time, having had to fight his way through Uberforce first to get to him. The issue ends with Silverwing in Alphaman's office and Alphaman confiding to Silverwing that he intends for Silverwing to be the team's leader.
