= Trilogy of Terror =

1975 television film by Dan Curtis

- TV Guide print ad
- Genre: Horror; thriller
- Written by: Richard Matheson; William F. Nolan
- Directed by: Dan Curtis
- Starring: Karen Black; Robert Burton; John Karlen; George Gaynes
- Music by: Robert Cobert
- Country of origin: United States
- Original language: English

Production
- Producer: Dan Curtis
- Production locations: 20th Century Fox Studios – 10201 Pico Blvd., Century City, Los Angeles
- Cinematography: Paul Lohmann
- Editor: Les Green
- Running time: 72 minutes
- Production companies: ABC Circle Films; Dan Curtis Productions

Original release
- Network: ABC
- Release: March 4, 1975

Related
- Trilogy of Terror II

Trilogy of Terror is a 1975 American made-for-television anthology horror film directed by Dan Curtis and starring Karen Black. It features three segments, each based on unrelated short stories by Richard Matheson. The first follows a college professor who seeks excitement with her students; the second is about twin sisters who have a bizarre relationship. These two segments were adapted by William F. Nolan. The third, adapted by Matheson himself, focuses on a woman terrorized by a Zuni fetish doll in her apartment. Black stars in all three segments, and plays dual roles in the second.

The film was first aired as an ABC Movie of the Week on March 4, 1975. Black initially turned down the project, but reconsidered when her then-husband, Robert Burton, was cast in the first segment "Julie". A television film sequel titled Trilogy of Terror II, written and also directed by Dan Curtis, was released in 1996.

== Plots ==
=== Story 1: Julie ===
College student Chad Rogers suddenly begins lusting after his straitlaced English professor, Julie Eldridge; he tells his friend Eddie Nells that the thought of what she is like naked just popped into his head. He asks her out, but she declines, as professors are forbidden from dating students. Later that evening, Chad watches Julie undressing in her room through a window. The next day, he asks Julie out again, and she accepts the offer.

During the date at a drive-in theater, Chad spikes Julie's drink, rendering her unconscious, and drives her to a motel. After checking them in as husband and wife, he photographs her in a variety of sexually provocative positions, and the scene fades to black. When she regains consciousness, he has driven her home and tells her that she fell asleep during the movie.

Chad develops the photographs and uses them to blackmail Julie into submitting to his sexual demands, even coercing her participation in orgies. Julie's roommate Anne becomes concerned about her repeated late night outings and unusually subdued manner, but Julie refuses to confide in her.

After one last sexual escapade with Chad, Julie gives him a poisoned drink and reveals that she manipulated their affair from the beginning, telepathically implanting lust for her inside Chad's mind. She informs him that she has carried out numerous affairs with young men to satiate her appetite for sexual thrills and danger, but inevitably gets bored, as she has now grown bored of Chad who fatally collapses from the poison. Julie then drags him into the darkroom and sets fire to the incriminating photographs.

Julie later adds a newspaper article reporting Chad's death in a house fire, to a scrapbook of articles depicting students who met similar fates. There is a knock at the door, and a male student in need of a tutor enters.

=== Story 2: Millicent and Therese ===
Millicent, a prudish brunette, is consumed by hatred for her twin sister Therese, a seductive and mean-spirited blonde. Millicent confronts Thomas Anmar, Therese's lover, and reveals that Therese told her all about an unspecified immoral event that happened during Thomas and Therese's sexual relationship. She explains that Therese does not care for Thomas and is only trying to corrupt him with her evil. Millicent confides in her friend and family therapist, Dr. Ramsey, that her sister had engaged in sex with their father, poisoned their mother, and is holding Millicent captive inside the family mansion, while gloating to Millicent about her deeds. Ramsey visits the mansion to speak with Therese, who comes on to Ramsey then furiously throws him out of the house when he refuses her sexual advances.

Millicent writes a letter to Dr. Ramsey, explaining that she has determined that Therese is evil and that she will stop her even if that means losing her own life, planning to use a voodoo doll to kill her. When Dr. Ramsey enters the house, he finds Therese dead on her bedroom floor with the doll next to her with no apparent cause of death. Dr. Ramsey removes Therese's blonde wig exposing Millicent's dark hair, revealing that "Therese" and "Millicent" are the same person. Therese suffered from multiple personality disorder brought on by her having had sex with her father and subsequently killed her mother. "Millicent" was an alternative personality with a repressed sexuality to cope with the horror of her actions. The recent death of her father unhinged her further, and the "murder" of Therese was actually suicide.

=== Story 3: Amelia ===
Amelia lives alone in a high-rise apartment building. When Amelia tells her overbearing mother that she is cancelling their evening plans in order to see her anthropologist boyfriend on his birthday, and that she bought him a wooden fetish doll in the form of a misshapen aboriginal warrior with pointed teeth and a spear, her mother hangs up. A scroll with the doll claims that the gold chain adorning the doll keeps the spirit of a Zuni hunter named "He Who Kills" trapped within. As Amelia leaves the room, the gold chain falls off.

Later, Amelia realizes the doll is not where she left it. Amelia hears a noise in the kitchen and finds a carving knife is missing. Returning to the living room, she is attacked by the doll, which stabs at her ankles and chases her around the apartment. Amelia envelops the doll in a towel and attempts to drown it in the bathtub. She later traps it in a suitcase. The doll begins cutting a hole through the suitcase with the knife, but Amelia stabs it with a screwdriver. Thinking it might be dead, she opens the case. It leaps out and sinks its teeth into her arm. After getting it off by smashing it into a lamp, she hurls the doll into the oven. She holds the oven door while the doll howls and screams as it burns. When the howling stops, she opens the oven to ensure that the doll is dead, and emits a blood-curdling scream.

Amelia later calls her mother and invites her to come over. She then rips the bolt from her front door and crouches down in a primitive manner, carrying a large carving knife with which she repeatedly stabs at the floor. She awaits her mother, grinning and revealing the teeth of the Zuni fetish doll, whose spirit now inhabits her body.

== Cast ==
"Julie"

- Karen Black as Julie Eldridge
- Robert Burton as Chad Rogers
- Jim Storm as Eddie Nells
- Gregory Harrison as New Student
- Kathryn Reynolds as Anne Richards
- Orin Cannon as Motel Clerk

"Millicent and Therese"

- Karen Black as Millicent / Therese
- John Karlen as Thomas Anmar
- George Gaynes as Dr. Chester Ramsey
- Tracy Curtis as Tracy

"Amelia"

- Karen Black as Amelia
- Walker Edmiston (uncredited) as the voice of the Zuni doll

== Production ==
=== Concept ===
All three of the segments in Trilogy of Terror are based on individual stories by horror writer Richard Matheson. "Amelia" was based on the short story "Prey", which first appeared in the April 1969 issue of Playboy. "Julie" was based on "The Likeness of Julie", published in 1962 in the short story anthology Alone by Night. "Millicent and Therese" was based on "Needle in the Heart", first published in Ellery Queen's Mystery Magazine, October 1969 issue. The segments "Julie" and "Millicent and Therese" were adapted by William F. Nolan, while Matheson adapted "Amelia" into a teleplay himself. On January 4, 1975, it was reported that Karen Black had signed on to appear in the film, portraying the three central characters.

=== Filming ===
Filming for Trilogy of Terror took place on location in Hollywood, Los Angeles in the winter of 1974–1975.

== Release ==
Trilogy of Terror first aired on ABC in the 8:30 p.m. time slot on March 4, 1975. Earlier, a press release was sent out calling the film "Trilogy in Terror".

The film was cut when first shown on Brazilian television in March 1981. Strict censorship regulations in the country then demanded that the third segment ("Amelia") be completely omitted. Forced to show the film with only two episodes, the TV station simply changed the title to Duas Histórias de Terror (Two Horror Stories).

=== Critical response ===
The Boston Globe praised Karen Black's "tour-de-force performance" in the film upon its original airing. Black felt the film led to genre typecasting, forcing her to accept many roles in B-grade horror films following the film's release. She stated, "I think this little movie took my life and put it on a path that it didn't even belong in."

On the internet review aggregator Rotten Tomatoes, the film holds an approval rating of 86% based on 28 reviews. The consensus summarizes: "Trilogy of Terror delivers a twisty anthology of macabre stories driven by Karen Black's captivating multi-character performance and whirlwind visuals."

Jeremiah Kipp from Slant Magazine awarded the film 3.5 out of 4 stars, praising the film's direction, script, and Black's performance. On Black's performance, Kipp wrote, "Black plays the female protagonist in each story, and she's the kind of extreme actress who not only acts with her eyes and face, but with her neck, her fingertips, her elbows, wrists, and torso. Gusto is not the word." Writing for AXS, Octavio Ramos deemed "Julie" a "lackluster story," but added: "Let's face it, there's only one real reason to watch Trilogy of Terror: The third segment of this made-for-television anthology, which features the famous Zuni fetish doll that comes to life and torments Karen Black. This segment alone makes Trilogy of Terror a must-own product for even the most casual horror fan."

Felix Vasquez from Cinema Crazed.com felt that the first two segments were "forgettable", and stated that only the last segment was "truly entertaining and creepy". Concluding his review, Vasquez wrote, "Trilogy of Terror was an all around disappointing film with a steady focus on psychological torment and less on actual terror or scares. I wish I could join along with the crowd and praise this film, but I would have had to be entertained to do so." TV Guide offered the film similar criticism, awarding it 2/4 stars. The reviewer criticized the first two segments as being "utterly wash out" in terms of suspense, dialogue, and storytelling. However, the reviewer commended the final segment as being "a simple, engrossing and claustrophobic set-piece of fear". Meagan Navarro from Bloody Disgusting included Trilogy of Terror in her list of "10 Scariest Made For TV Horror Movies", praising the final segment as 'keeping the film forever at the forefront of made-for-television movie memory'.

=== Home video ===
Anchor Bay Entertainment released the film on DVD on August 24, 1999, and on VHS on July 11, 2000. A special edition DVD was released by Dark Sky Films/MPI Home Video on August 29, 2006.

The film was released on Blu-ray and on DVD by Kino Lorber Studio Classics on October 16, 2018. Both Blu-ray and DVD are remastered in 4K and includes audio commentaries, interviews and two featurettes.

== Legacy ==
Trilogy of Terror has developed a cult following over the years and earned a reputation as a cult classic. It also helped establish Karen Black a devoted cult following as a performer in horror films.

The "Amelia" segment was the inspiration for the 1997 parodical short film, Karen Black Like Me, which featured Emil (Ira Rosenberg), a gay man, being terrorized by a possessed sex toy.

The Zuni Doll from the segment "Amelia" has been called by some as being "one of the scariest dolls in movie history".

In 2011, Complex magazine named Trilogy of Terror the fourth-greatest television film of all time, while MeTV deemed it the scariest television film of all time in 2016.

== Sequel ==
A sequel titled Trilogy of Terror II was aired on October 30, 1996. The sequel was again directed by Dan Curtis, who also co-wrote the film, and starred Lysette Anthony.

== See also ==
- List of American films of 1975
- Killer toy
