= Tenth Muse =

10th Muse
- First issue of Volume 2

Publication information
- Publisher: TidalWave Productions; Arcana Studio
- First appearance: 10th Muse Volume #1 - from Image Comics
- Created by: Darren G. Davis

In-story information
- Alter ego: Emma Sonnet

Tenth Muse (also 10th Muse) is an independent superhero comic book series about a modern-day daughter of the Greek god Zeus. It was created in 2000 by Darren G. Davis and originally written by Marv Wolfman.

Several real-life models served as inspiration for the main character, starting with Rena Mero at launch, then later Cindy Margolis or Farrah Fawcett.

The property was optioned for a TV show in 2002. Darren Davis told to Nicholas Yanes of Scifipulse.net that he was interested in having his property developed as a television series at The CW and expressed to see Katie Cassidy to play the lead role.

== Story ==
Lead character Emma Sonnet returns after disappearing eight years before, with no answers for former best friends Brett and Dawn about where she has been and how she has become the until-now unheard-of tenth sister of the mythological nine Muses, the inspirational daughters of the almighty Zeus.

The story involves a crossover with the Mike Wieringo comic book Tellos.

== Publication ==
The original series started publication in November 2000, published by Image Comics. It was written by Marv Wolfman and illustrated by various artists. It ran for nine issues until February 2002, followed by a collection and a few one-shots. Darren G. Davis then began self-publishing the title via TidalWave Productions.

In 2005, the series was relaunched as The 10th Muse Volume 2 with a new #1 issue, starting publication in April from Alias Enterprises.

In 2009, a new personification of the character was released in a four-issue limited series called Tenth Muse 800 set eight hundred years in the future. In this version of the series, the alter ego of "Emma Sonnet" was dropped and the heroic version of Lyxandra became the star. All four issues were written by Adam Gragg and penciled by Roman Morales III.

In 2010, there was a new series called 10th Muse: The Lost Issues, by Roger Cruz and Darren G. Davis. These are issues that were previously published as Tenth Muse: The Odyssey graphic novel and the second issue of Avatar's publishing (10th Muse V2). Also that year, a graphic novel featuring 10th Muse with all her crossovers came out. The crossovers featured the 10th Muse and Shi, Savage Dragon, Tellos, Koni Waves and Ezra.

In 2013, Bluewater Productions published Crossed Wires, a four-issue miniseries that saw 10th Muse cross over with Badger, Bomb Queen, and Judo Girl.
