= Warlock 5 =

Warlock 5 is a comic book that was written by Gordon Derry with art by Denis Beauvais and was published by Aircel Comics.

== Publication history ==
Volume 1 lasted for 22 issues, published from 1986 to 1989. Volume 2 lasted for 7 issues, all published in 1989.

Only the first thirteen issues of Volume 1 were created by Derry and Beauvais before Aircel replaced them with an entirely new creative team, art style, characters, logo, and story with no connection to the original.

These issues, later collected in 2021 by Outland Entertainment in an Omnibus Edition, featured guardians from five different realities in opposition to or in alliance with each other, often seeking to eliminate the others and gain access to their realities but also reluctantly working together to defend or repair The Grid, a nexus-point for their realities.

The original Warlock Five were:

- Doomidor: A crimson-armored dark fantasy warlord.
- Zania: A gun-toting chain-smoking anarchist punk rock necromancer.
- Tanith: A beautiful platinum-blonde sorceress.
- Savashtar: A shape-shifting trenchcoat-wearing humanoid dragon.
- Argon: A green Terminator-like cyborg from a techno-hell.

As of Volume 1, issue #14 and onward, the series seems to have had something to do with elves (as depicted on multiple covers).

The 2021 omnibus contains the original unpublished issues #14 and #15, by Derry and Beauvais.

== Plot ==
Warlock 5 is a comic book in which five beings engage in a fight for the thing of ultimate importance.

== Reception ==
Martin A. Stever reviewed Warlock 5 in Space Gamer/Fantasy Gamer No. 83. Stever commented that "the lure of this book is that the reader is unsure of exactly what is going on. Lots of magic, guns, swords, robots, babes, motorcycles, and very nice art".
