= Logan's Run (game) =

Play-by-mail role-playing game

- Publishers: Sanctuary Games
- Years active: 1983 to unknown
- Genres: role-playing
- Languages: English
- Players: 20–30
- Playing time: Fixed
- Materials required: Instructions, order sheets, turn results, paper, pencil
- Media type: Play-by-mail

Logan's Run is a closed-end, computer moderated, play-by-mail role-playing game. It was published by Sanctuary Games and based on the 1967 book Logan's Run.

== History and development ==
Logan's Run was a closed-end, computer-moderated PBM game. Bob McLain described it as a "conflict interactive simulation". It was based on the 1967 book Logan's Run. The game was published by Sanctuary Games. It was programmed on an Apple II in Pascal. In a 1984 issue of Paper Mayhem, the editors noted that the publisher had apparently ceased communicating with players.

== Gameplay ==
Each game typically started with 20 to 30 players, who could choose between two roles: Runner or Sandman. Runners aimed to escape from the city where all players began, while Sandmen tried to prevent these escapes. Once a Runner escaped, the player with the most victory points won.

== Reviews ==
The Editors of The Nuts & Bolts of PBM reviewed the game in a 1983 issue. They stated that it was an "introductory level game which an old 'die hard PBM gamer' might use to entice non-PBM friends into the hobby. It would not hold the interest of an experienced PBM gamer for very long".

Bob McLain reviewed the game in the November–December 1983 issue of PBM Universal. He stated that it was "Fun, though rather limited, with the potential for some exciting turns. Most people who have tried the game admit they'd go back for seconds."

== See also ==
- List of play-by-mail games

== Bibliography ==
- McLain, Bob (November–December 1983). "Gamealog: Logan's Run". PBM Universal. No. 1. p. 27.
- Editors (1983). "Galactic Voyage [Ad]". Nuts & Bolts of Gaming. Vol. 3, no. 14. pp. 24–25.
- Editors (1984). "Is Anyone There?". Paper Mayhem. No. 5. p. 21.
