= Logan's World =

1977 novel by William F. Nolan

- First edition
- Author: William F. Nolan
- Cover artist: Mitchell Hooks
- Language: English
- Genre: science fiction
- Published: December 1977, Bantam Books
- Publication place: United States
- Media type: Print Paperback
- Pages: 149 (first edition, paperback)
- ISBN: 0-553-11418-2 (first edition, paperback)
- OCLC: 3452315
- Dewey Decimal: 823.91
- LC Class: PS3564.O39
- Preceded by: Logan's Run
- Followed by: Logan's Search

Logan's World (1977) is a science fiction novel by American writer William F. Nolan. It is a sequel to Logan's Run (1967), written by Nolan and George Clayton Johnson.

== Plot ==
Logan and Jessica have lived on Argos (the fabled Sanctuary), a space station in orbit around Mars, for four years, along with 3,000 other Runners. They have a two-year-old son named Jaq.

On Earth, Ballard's escape line for Runners at Cape Steinbeck is discovered and destroyed by Deep Sleep operatives. Ballard escapes to Crazy Horse Mountain, and sabotages the Thinker complex buried in the catacombs below the statue. While he is killed in the explosion, he succeeds in destroying the computer network and making the world free.

With Ballard's death, supply ships to Argos cease. For six more years the Runners there hang on, until there are less than a few dozen of them. They have no more food, and plague is running rampant. They draw straws — a handful will return to Earth. Logan, Jessica and Jaq are among those chosen.

Logan and family settle with a group called the Wilderness People along the Potomac River in Washington D.C. Life is tough — learning to farm is not easy — but good until Jaq falls deathly ill. Logan sneaks back into the Angeles Complex to get medicine for his son. While he is gone, an insane pack of devilstick-riding Borgia gypsies murders Jaq and kidnaps Jessica. Logan finds himself on the run again, this time to save his wife and avenge his murdered son.

As the story unfolds, he meets blind mystics who live on the rusted shell of the Golden Gate Bridge, he travels to the New York Complex and finally back to Crazy Horse Mountain, where he discovers the Thinker is being reactivated by Gant, a former Deep Sleep operative who despises Logan for his part in destroying his world. Gant has purchased Jessica from the gypsies to lure Logan into a trap.

Mary Mary, a young woman who as a "Cub" met Logan and Jessica on their earlier run, helps them defeat Gant's plan to re-enslave humankind.

== Continuity ==
Logan still has his Sandman gun in this novel, which is a retcon by Nolan as he lost it at the end of the previous novel when it went "wild" (sounded an alarm when Logan's palm flower went black). In this book, Logan has the gun in a box.

In the third novel in the series, Logan's Search, Nolan addresses this apparent continuity error as Logan muses about how he obtained and altered another Sandman's gun after joining the Wilderness People, to deactivate its identity sensing technology, which is described as an exacting and delicate process, meaning that the gun he uses in Logan's World is not his original gun.

== History ==
Following the success of the 1976 film version Logan's Run, Nolan had pitched a sequel. MGM expressed interest in adapting Logan's World as a film, but the original film's producer Saul David had opted to focus on a Logan's Run TV series instead. Logan's World was published by Bantam in 1977.

== Comic adaptation ==
Beginning in May 1991, Adventure Comics published a 6 issue bimonthly adaptation of Logan's World by Tom Mason, Chris Ulm and Barry Blair.
