= Logan's Run =

1967 novel by William F. Nolan & George Clayton Johnson

- First edition; cover art by Mercer Mayer
- Author: William F. Nolan; George Clayton Johnson
- Language: English
- Genre: Science fiction novel
- Publisher: The Dial Press
- Publication date: 1967
- Publication place: United States
- Media type: Print (Hardback & Paperback)
- Pages: 133
- Followed by: Logan's World

Logan's Run is a science fiction novel by American writers William F. Nolan and George Clayton Johnson. Published in 1967, the novel depicts a dystopic Malthusian future society in which both population and the consumption of resources are maintained in equilibrium by requiring the death of everyone reaching the age of 21. The story follows the actions of Logan, a Sandman charged with enforcing the rule, as he tracks down and kills citizens who "run" from society's lethal demand, only to end up "running" as well.

== Plot ==
The introduction to the book says:

The seeds of the Little War were planted in a restless summer during the mid-1960s, with sit-ins and student demonstrations as youth tested its strength. By the early 1970s, over 75 percent of the people living on Earth were under twenty-one years of age. The population continued to climb—and, with it, the youth percentage. In the 1980s, the figure was 79.7 percent. In the 1990s, 82.4 percent. In the year 2000—critical mass.

In the world of 2116, a person's maximum age is strictly legislated as 21 years, to the day. When people reach this Lastday they report to a [CTF] Sleepshop in which they are willingly executed via a pleasure-inducing toxic gas. A person's age is revealed by their palm flower crystal embedded in the palm of their right hand that changes color every seven years; yellow (age 0–6), then blue (age 7–13), red (age 14–20), then blinking red and black on Lastday, and finally turning black at 21.

Runners refuse to report to a Sleepshop and attempt to avoid their fate by escaping to Sanctuary, a place where they can live freely in defiance of society's dictates. Logan 3 is a Deep Sleep Operative (also called a Sandman) whose job is to terminate Runners using a special weapon called "the gun", a handgun with selectable ordnance keyed to self-destruct if touched by an individual who is not the proper owner. Runners are most terrified of a weapon called the "Homer", which homes in on body heat and ignites every pain nerve in the body, killing the target.

Sandmen practice Omnite, a hybrid type of martial arts. On his own Lastday, Logan becomes a Runner to infiltrate an apparent underground railroad for runners seeking Sanctuary.

For most of the book, Logan is an antihero; however, his character develops sympathy towards Runners and becomes more of a traditional hero figure.

He is aided distrustfully by Jessica 6, whose Runner brother, Doyle 10, was chased into Cathedral by Logan and killed by the vicious pre-teens known as "Cubs".

Francis, another Sandman and a friend of Logan, catches up with Logan and Jessica after they make it to the final staging area before Sanctuary. Francis reveals that his true identity is that of the legendary Ballard, who has been helping arrange their escape. Francis tells them he is aged 42, but due to his faulty palm flower, which does not change color, and through the use of plastic-surgery shops, he has been able to disguise his true age and appearance. He is working from within the system, as he believes the computer controlling the global infrastructure, buried beneath Crazy Horse Mountain, is beginning to malfunction, and society will die with it.

Sanctuary turns out to be Argos, a previously abandoned space colony near Mars.

Logan and Jessica escape to the colony on a rocket, which departs from a former space program launch site in Florida, while Ballard remains to help others escape.

== Sequels and spin-offs ==
Nolan wrote two sequels, Logan's World and Logan's Search, published after the film's release (respectively in 1977 and 1980). A novelette, "Logan's Return", was published as an e-book in 2001. Logan's Last Run, written by Nolan and Paul McComas was published in 2026 to coincide with the fiftieth anniversary of the release of the film adaptation.

- Logan's World deals with events following Logan's return to Earth, amidst the survivors and ruins of the system he escaped in the first novel.
- Logan's Search deals with Logan going to an alternate reality (with the assistance of aliens) to once again stop the government system he escaped in the first novel, albeit with some minor changes.
- Logan's Last Run deals with a time machine which sends Logan and Jessica back to the Eocene Epoch where they battle time-traveling Sandmen, the cyber-being Box, and the master computer known as The Thinker.

George Clayton Johnson's long-rumored personal sequel to Logan's Run, titled Jessica's Run: A New Sequel for the Logan's Run Universe, was said to be "in development". It was still in development at the time of George Clayton Johnson's death on Christmas Day 2015.

== Reception ==
David Pringle gave Logan's Run two stars out of four and praised the novel as "a good SF thriller"; he also stated it was superior to the film version.

== Adaptations ==
=== Film ===
The novel was adapted in 1976 as a film, directed by Michael Anderson and starring Michael York as Logan 5 (not 3), Jenny Agutter as Jessica 6, and Richard Jordan as Francis 7. The film was produced by Saul David, a former MGM executive and well-known science fiction supporter (having produced and developed Fantastic Voyage in 1966 at Fox, and developed Westworld at MGM). The film uses minimal premises and plot lines from the novel (everyone must die at a specific age, Logan runs with Jessica as his companion while being chased by Francis).

The film's world is post-apocalyptic and dystopian, in which people now live inside a huge domed city and are oblivious of the outside world, believing it to be a barren, poisonous environment. The motivations of the characters are also quite different — in the film, the age of planned death is 30 — instead of reporting to a Sleepshop, citizens must take part in a ritual called "Carrousel" [sic] in which they are incinerated with the chance of being "renewed". Logan is a 26-year-old Sandman, sent by the computer to find and destroy Sanctuary. The computer alters his palm flower (here called a "life clock") to show him as approaching Lastday, and he becomes a runner and escapes from the city.

Sanctuary turns out not to exist: It is revealed that Runners have been murdered by a malfunctioning food processing robot just outside the city. The only other person that Logan and Jessica encounter outside the city is an old man (Peter Ustinov) who lives with a large number of cats in the United States Senate chamber of the largely intact ruins of Washington, D.C. Logan kills Francis, who is simply a Sandman in the movie and not a rebel leader, and leads the old man back to remain just outside the domed city, returning to try to lead a revolt against the culling. No one believes or listens to him or Jessica; instead, he is captured by the Sandmen. In his interrogation by the computer, his information that there is no Sanctuary causes the computer to malfunction and self-destruct. Logan and Jessica then flee.

As the young population leaves the confines of the burning and exploding domed city, they meet the old man outside — the first time they have seen anybody of that age.

==== Possible remake ====
In the mid-1990s, Warner Bros. began development of a remake of the movie. In April 2000, director Skip Woods entered negotiations with the studio and producer Joel Silver to write and direct the remake. The director planned to make it closer to the novel than the original film, restoring elements including Crazy Horse Mountain and sky gypsies. In March 2004, director Bryan Singer was brought in to develop and direct Logan's Run. Singer had begun working with production designer Guy Dyas from his previous film X2 (2003). Screenwriters Ethan Gross and Paul Todisco were hired to write the script with the director, with the film being slated for a 2005 release. In October, Singer said he had begun previsualization of Logan's Run, which would be completed by the time he finished production of his project at the time, Superman Returns (2006). The following December, screenwriter Dan Harris said that he and the director had turned in a first draft for Logan's Run. The screenwriter said that the remake would contain more action than the original film, describing the premise to be "a remake of the concept of the movie plus the book".

In February 2005, screenwriter Christopher McQuarrie was hired to rewrite the script, with filming to take place in Australia. One year later, Logan's Run was announced to begin production later that year in Vancouver. The following May, Singer's availability to direct Logan's Run was rendered questionable by scheduling conflicts with filming a planned sequel to Superman Returns. By May, Singer confirmed that he would not direct Logan's Run, seeking a vacation from the demands of his job. Directors Robert Schwentke and James McTeigue were approached for the project, but neither signed on.

In April 2007, producer Joel Silver reiterated his plan to remake the original film. Later in August, Joseph Kosinski signed on to direct the film.

In May and June 2010, Carl Erik Rinsch was hired to direct, and Alex Garland and Michael Dougherty were set to write the script. Rinsch later pulled out of the project due to scheduling conflicts. In August 2011, Danish filmmaker Nicolas Winding Refn was attached to direct the remake, which would star Ryan Gosling and Rose Byrne, with a script by Andrew Baldwin. In June 2013, video game developer Ken Levine was attached to write the screenplay. The latest concept for the film was based on a female lead in April 2015.

By July 2015, Levine had exited the project and was replaced by Simon Kinberg, who in addition to writing a new story and treatment, also planned to produce the film with Greg Berlanti. Ryan Condal was reportedly hired to write the screenplay, based on Kinberg's treatment, in June 2016. In March 2018, Kinberg was confirmed to be directing the film, from a screenplay by Peter Craig.

Silver resigned from his own production company in 2019, amid allegations of financial mismanagement; the blog Gizmodo later speculated that his resignation meant that the remake would "most likely never happen".

=== Television ===
A television series spin-off from the film, starring Gregory Harrison as Logan 5 and Heather Menzies as Jessica 6, lasted one season of 14 episodes, from September 16, 1977, through January 16, 1978, on U.S. television (CBS-TV). D. C. Fontana served as story editor and employed several other writers from Star Trek, as well as the original novel's authors. The series pilot was produced by Saul David, who was replaced by CBS with veteran television producers Ivan Goff and Ben Roberts.

=== Other adaptations ===
- Marvel Comics published a short-lived comic book series, which adapted the movie's story and briefly continued beyond it until the book was cancelled with issue #6.
- A Logan's Run play-by-mail game based on the novel started in 1983.
- From June 1990 to March 1992, Adventure Comics published mini-series comics adaptations of Logan's Run and Logan's World, six issues each, with art by Barry Blair. A promised adaption of Logan's Search never materialized.
- A hardcover Logan's Run Annual based on the TV series and featuring strip art by David Lloyd was published in the United Kingdom by publishers Brown Watson in late 1977, dated 1978. In addition, a Logan's Run comic strip also based on the TV series, written by Angus P. Allan and drawn by Arthur Ranson, ran in the TV-based British weekly comic Look-In from April–September 1978.
- In 2000, Emperor Norton Records published Logan's Sanctuary, an album of electronica music conceived as the soundtrack to an imagined Logan's Run sequel, written and performed by Roger Joseph Manning Jr. and Brian Reitzell, and featuring contributions from Jason Falkner.
- City of Domes, an alternative reality game (ARG), was created by the Web development group at VirtuQuest.com. The game was a recreation of the Logan's Run city, some 30 years after Logan 6's adventures.
- Beginning in 2010, Bluewater Productions began publishing various iterations of the original novel and continuations of the characters in comic book format, starting with Logan's Run: Last Day.

== See also ==
- Dystopia / Utopia
- Eugenics
- Euthanasia / Altruistic suicide
- "Half a Life" (Star Trek: The Next Generation episode)
- Human population planning
- In Time
- Soylent Green
- The Bull's Hour, Ivan Yefremov's 1968 book
- The Giver
- The Island
