= Darren G. Davis =

American comic book publisher and writer

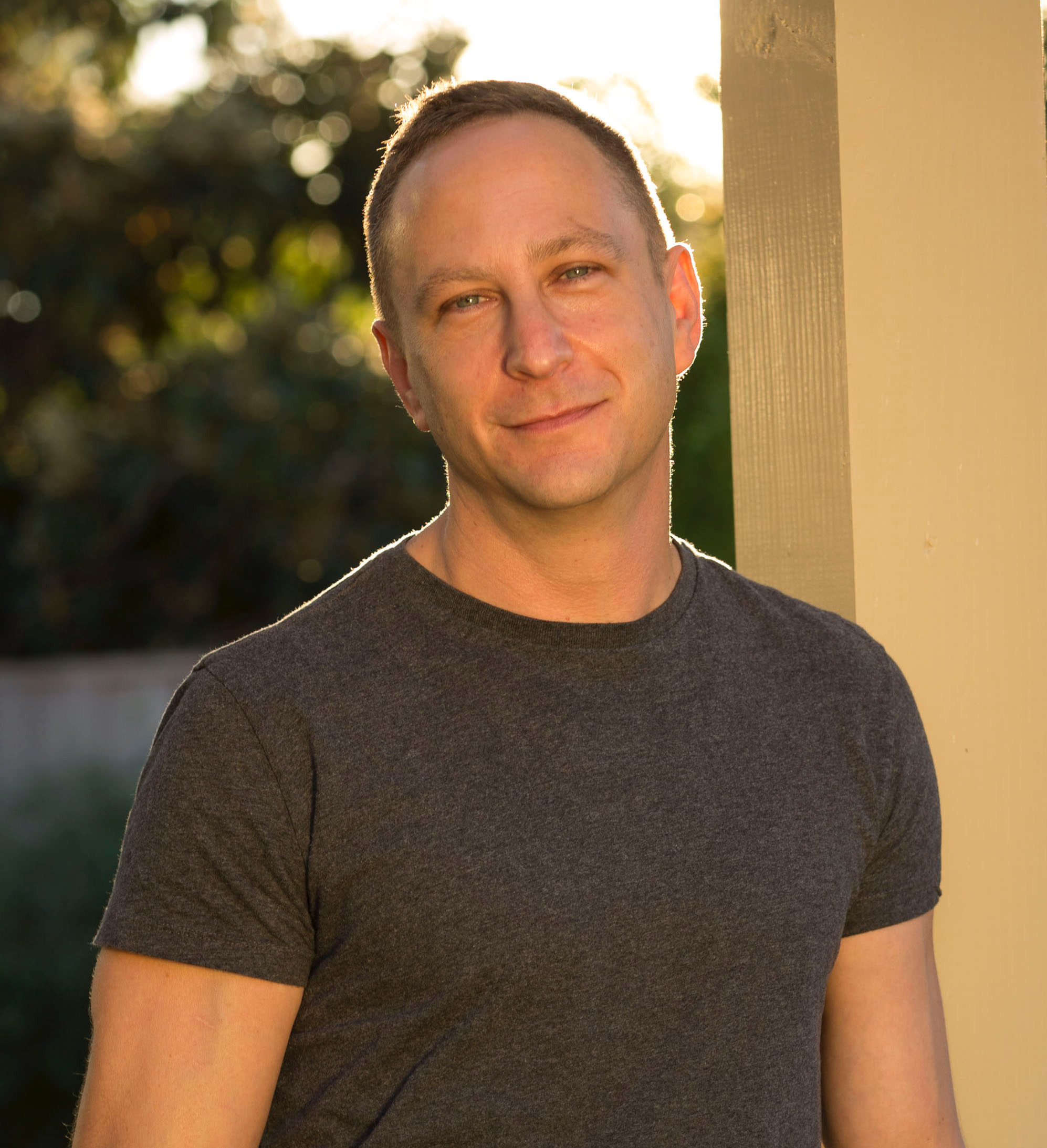
- Darren G. Davis
- Born: July 8, 1968 (age 58) Long Island, New York, U.S.
- Areas: Publisher, editor, writer
- Notable works: 10th Muse; Legend of Isis; Lost Raven; Wrath of the Titans
- Awards: The Mark Twain Award for Logan's Run

Darren G. Davis is an American independent comic book publisher and writer. He is the head of TidalWave Productions based in Portland, Oregon.

== Career ==
Davis began his career marketing the entertainment industry at E! Entertainment Television, USA Network, and Lion's Gate Entertainment. He entered comics publishing working for Jim Lee at Wildstorm, which shortly after was acquired by DC Comics. Davis also served as president of Joe Madureira's Beyond Entertainment.

Davis founded TidalWave Productions in 2000. Original titles created by Davis include 10th Muse, Legend of Isis, Orion the Hunter, Judo Girl, The Blackbeard Legacy, Victoria's Secret Service, and The Mis-Adventures of Adam West. Isis and Victoria's Secret Service have both been optioned for feature films, and 10th Muse was optioned for a television show. In 2015 he co-created comic book series with the Beekman Boys and Discovery Channel's Survivorman. Davis has created other series such as Stormy Daniels: Space Force, Juliet, Dorian Gray, Tony & Cleo, Atlas and more.

Davis has created various line of biography comic book titles - Political Power, Female Force, Infamous, Tribute, Orbit and FAME.

Davis created a line of superhero children's books based on his character Atlas, titled ABC's for Superheroes, 123's for Superheroes and Superheroes Guide to the Planets. He has written two YA graphic novels, 10th Muse: Maze of the Minotaur and Zak Raven, Esq., the latter of which features one of the first HIV-positive protagonists in a YA graphic novel. Proceeds from the sales go to the Evergreen AIDS Foundation.

== Personal life ==
Davis was raised in southern California where he developed an appreciation for Greek mythology and comic books. Many of his original characters are heavily influenced by classical mythology, including Emma Sonnet, the eponymous heroine of 10th Muse.

Davis was diagnosed as HIV-positive in 1999. Davis has used his platform as a comic book creator to educate and reduce stigma about the disease, speaking to high schools about people living with HIV. He worked with the Evergreen AIDS Foundation in Bellingham, Washington as a client services coordinator and events manager. In an interview with HIVPlusMag.com, Davis highlights his efforts to spread understanding about HIV and AIDS, “I want people to know that they do have options and choices--because at first you're just trying to comprehend it all.” In regards to his social activism, Davis has stated that "the highlight of my career was tied to this book when I got to speak at Yale University about the Lost Raven graphic novel."

In 2019, Davis was married to Daniel Sene. The couple was walked down the aisle by pop-star Debbie Gibson.

== See also ==
- List of LGBT people from Portland, Oregon
