= Denis Beauvais =

Canadian artist (born 1962)

- Born: 1962 (age 62–63); Ottawa, Ontario, Canada
- Education: Self-taught
- Known for: Fantasy art
- Notable work: Freelance
- Spouse: Betsy McLean
- Website: www.denbeauvais.com

Denis ("Den") Beauvais (born 1962) is a Canadian artist whose work has appeared in role-playing games. He was born and raised in Ottawa.

== Career ==
Den Beauvais spent one year studying in the art program at the High School of Commerce, but is otherwise self-taught. Beauvais has done cover art on books, magazines, and game boxes. He won the Eagle Award in 1989 for Favourite Comic Book Cover for Aliens, and was nominated for the Chesley Award for Best Paper Back/Hard Cover Artist in 1992 and 1994. He has also done work for the Dungeons & Dragons role-playing game, including doing 13 covers for Dragon beginning in 1983. His Dungeons & Dragons covers include Temple of the Frog, and Van Richten's Guide to Vampires. He also licensed work to Dark Horse Comics, and worked on the Predator comics.
